= 2026 New York State Assembly election (districts 1–50) =

2026 New York Assembly election
- November 3, 2026

All 150 seats in the New York State Assembly 76 seats needed for a majority
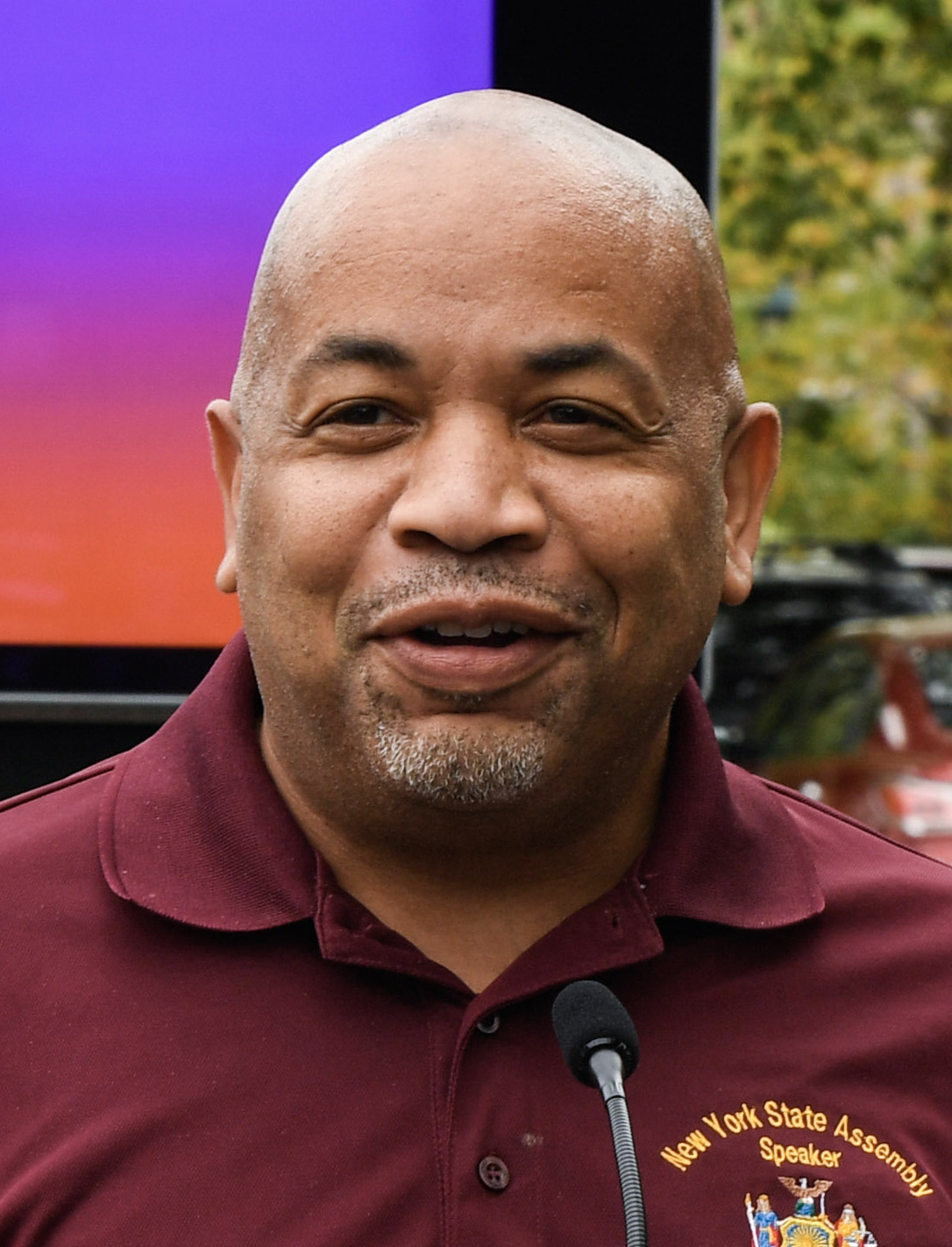

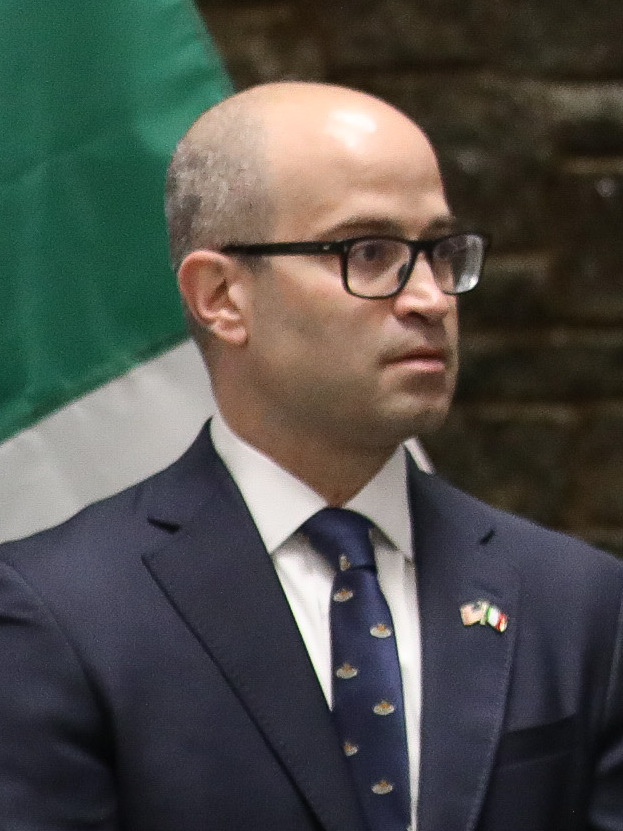
Leader	Carl Heastie	Ed Ra
Party	Democratic	Republican
Leader since	February 3, 2015	February 9, 2026
Leader's seat	83rd district	19th district
Last election	103 seats, 54.6%	47 seats, 37.0%
Current seats	103 seats	47 seats
Seats needed	Steady	▲29
- Democratic incumbent Democratic incumbent retiring or lost renomination Republican incumbent Republican incumbent retiring
Incumbent Speaker
Carl Heastie
Democratic

The 2026 New York State Assembly election was held on November 3, 2026. Primary elections were held on June 23, 2026. The Democratic Party has held a majority in the New York State Assembly since 1975. It was held alongside elections for governor, attorney general, comptroller, United States House of Representatives, and State Senate.

Candidates were required to file paperwork between March 30 and April 2, 2026, to run.

== District 1 ==
2026 New York's 1st State Assembly district election
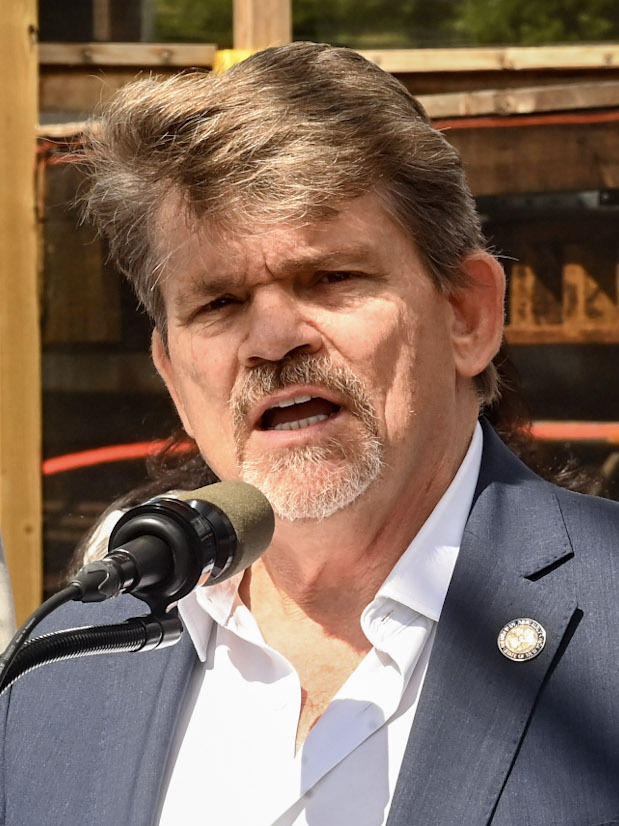

Nominee	Tommy John Schiavoni	Stephen F. Kiely
Party	Democratic	Republican
Alliance	Working Families	Conservative
Incumbent Assemblymember
Tommy John Schiavoni
Democratic

The 1st district is located entirely within Suffolk County, including the towns of East Hampton, Shelter Island, Southampton, Southold, and parts of Brookhaven, and the Indian reservation of Shinnecock Reservation. The incumbent is Democrat Tommy John Schiavoni, who defeated Republican Stephen F. Kiely to succeed retiring fourteen-full-term Democratic incumbent Fred Thiele with 56.37% of the vote in 2024.

=== Democratic primary ===
==== Nominee ====
- Tommy John Schiavoni, incumbent assemblymember

==== Endorsements ====
Tommy John Schiavoni

Political parties

- New York Working Families Party

=== Republican primary ===
==== Nominee ====
- Stephen F. Kiely, nominee for this district in 2024

=== Third parties and independents ===
==== Declared ====
- Stephen F. Kiely (Conservative), nominee for this district in 2024
- Tommy John Schiavoni (Working Families), incumbent assemblymember

=== General election ===
==== Predictions ====
Source	Ranking	As of
State Navigate	Solid D	November 2, 2026

==== Fundraising ====
Campaign finance reports as of October 19, 2026
Candidate	Contributions	Loans	Expenditures
Tommy John Schiavoni (D)	$252,208.86	$0.00	$151,811.74
Stephen F. Kiely (R)	$97,654.97	$0.00	$54,312.95
Source: Transparency USA

==== Results ====
2026 New York's 1st State Assembly district election
Party	Candidate	Votes	%	±%
Democratic	Tommy John Schiavoni			
Working Families	Tommy John Schiavoni			
Total	Tommy John Schiavoni (incumbent)			
Republican	Stephen F. Kiely			
Conservative	Stephen F. Kiely			
Total	Stephen F. Kiely			
Write-in				
Total votes				

== District 2 ==
2026 New York's 2nd State Assembly district election
Nominee	Jodi Giglio	Michael J. Szika	Kimberly Wilder
Party	Republican	Democratic	Voter Options
Alliance	Conservative
Incumbent Assemblymember
Jodi Giglio
Republican

The 2nd district is located entirely within Suffolk County, including the towns of Riverhead and parts of Brookhaven. The incumbent is Republican Jodi Giglio, who defeated Democrat Tricia L. Chiaramonte to win a third term with 64.59% of the vote in 2024.

=== Republican primary ===
==== Nominee ====
- Jodi Giglio, incumbent assemblymember

=== Democratic primary ===
==== Nominee ====
- Michael J. Szika

=== Third parties and independents ===
==== Declared ====
- Jodi Giglio (Conservative), incumbent assemblymember
- Kimberly Wilder (Voter Options)

=== General election ===
==== Predictions ====
Source	Ranking	As of
State Navigate	Solid R	November 2, 2026

==== Fundraising ====
Campaign finance reports as of October 19, 2026
Candidate	Contributions	Loans	Expenditures
Jodi Giglio (R)	$105,298.64	$0.00	$70,759.78
Michael J. Szika (D)	$0.00	$0.00	$0.00
Kimberly Wilder (I)	$3,603.92	$0.00	$2,213.19
Source: Transparency USA

==== Results ====
2026 New York's 2nd State Assembly district election
Party	Candidate	Votes	%	±%
Republican	Jodi Giglio			
Conservative	Jodi Giglio			
Total	Jodi Giglio (incumbent)			
Democratic	Michael J. Szika			
Voter Options	Kimberly Wilder			
Write-in				
Total votes				

== District 3 ==
2026 New York's 3rd State Assembly district election
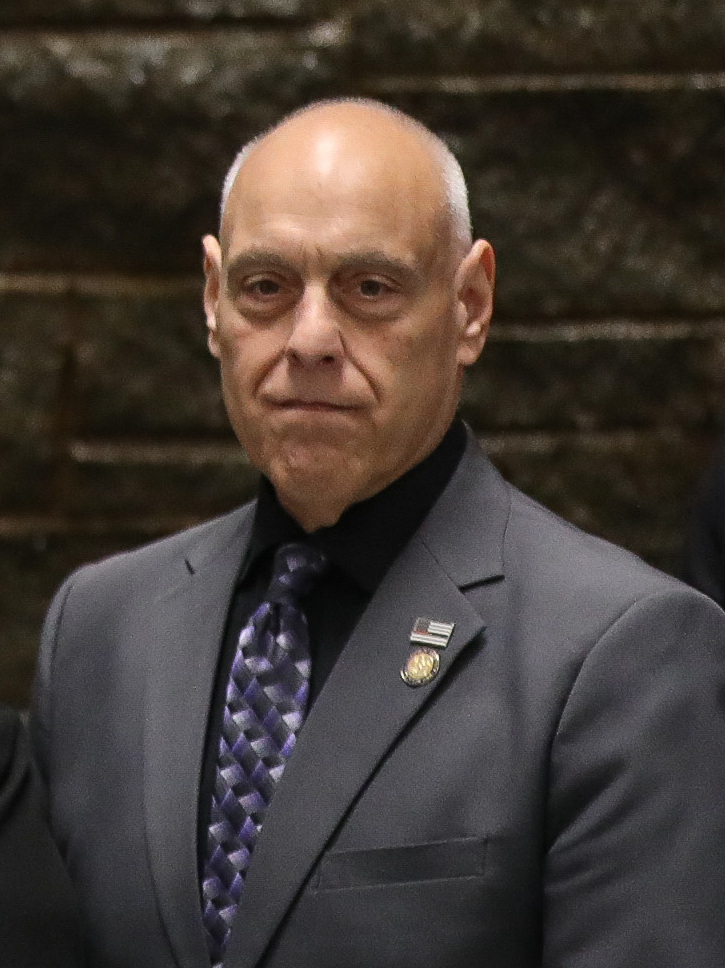

Nominee	Joe DeStefano	Joshua P. Slaughter
Party	Republican	Democratic
Alliance	Conservative	Working Families
Incumbent Assemblymember
Joe DeStefano
Republican

The 3rd district is located entirely within Suffolk County, including parts of the town of Brookhaven, and the Indian reservation of Poospatuck Reservation. The incumbent is Republican Joe DeStefano, who defeated Democrat Trina R. Miles to win a fourth term with 60.32% of the vote in 2024.

=== Republican primary ===
==== Nominee ====
- Joe DeStefano, incumbent assemblymember

=== Democratic primary ===
==== Nominee ====
- Joshua P. Slaughter

==== Endorsements ====
Joshua P. Slaughter

Political parties

- New York Working Families Party

=== Third parties and independents ===
==== Declared ====
- Joe DeStefano (Conservative), incumbent assemblymember
- Joshua P. Slaughter (Working Families)

=== General election ===
==== Predictions ====
Source	Ranking	As of
State Navigate	Solid R	November 2, 2026

==== Fundraising ====
Campaign finance reports as of October 19, 2026
Candidate	Contributions	Loans	Expenditures
Joe DeStefano (R)	$371,096.85	$0.00	$297,138.70
Joshua P. Slaughter (D)	$305,095.50	$0.00	$183,183.06
Source: Transparency USA

==== Results ====
2026 New York's 3rd State Assembly district election
Party	Candidate	Votes	%	±%
Republican	Joe DeStefano			
Conservative	Joe DeStefano			
Total	Joe DeStefano (incumbent)			
Democratic	Joshua P. Slaughter			
Working Families	Joshua P. Slaughter			
Total	Joshua P. Slaughter			
Write-in				
Total votes				

== District 4 ==
2026 New York's 4th State Assembly district election
Nominee	Rebecca Kassay	William A. Sussman
Party	Democratic	Republican
Alliance		Conservative
Incumbent Assemblymember
Rebecca Kassay
Democratic

The 4th district is located entirely within Suffolk County, including parts of the town of Brookhaven. The incumbent is Democrat Rebecca Kassay, who defeated one-term Republican incumbent Ed Flood with 50.65% of the vote in 2024.

=== Democratic primary ===
==== Nominee ====
- Rebecca Kassay, incumbent assemblymember

=== Republican primary ===
==== Nominee ====
- William A. Sussman, adjunct professor of computer science at Yeshiva University

=== Third parties and independents ===
==== Declared ====
- William A. Sussman (Conservative), adjunct professor of computer science at Yeshiva University

=== General election ===
==== Predictions ====
Source	Ranking	As of
State Navigate	Likely D	November 2, 2026

==== Fundraising ====
Campaign finance reports as of October 19, 2026
Candidate	Contributions	Loans	Expenditures
Rebecca Kassay (D)	$394,623.80	$0.00	$308,595.87
William A. Sussman (R)	$201,930.20	$0.00	$170,646.80
Source: Transparency USA

==== Results ====
2026 New York's 4th State Assembly district election
Party	Candidate	Votes	%	±%
Democratic	Rebecca Kassay (incumbent)			
Republican	William A. Sussman			
Conservative	William A. Sussman			
Total	William A. Sussman			
Write-in				
Total votes				

== District 5 ==
2026 New York's 5th State Assembly district election
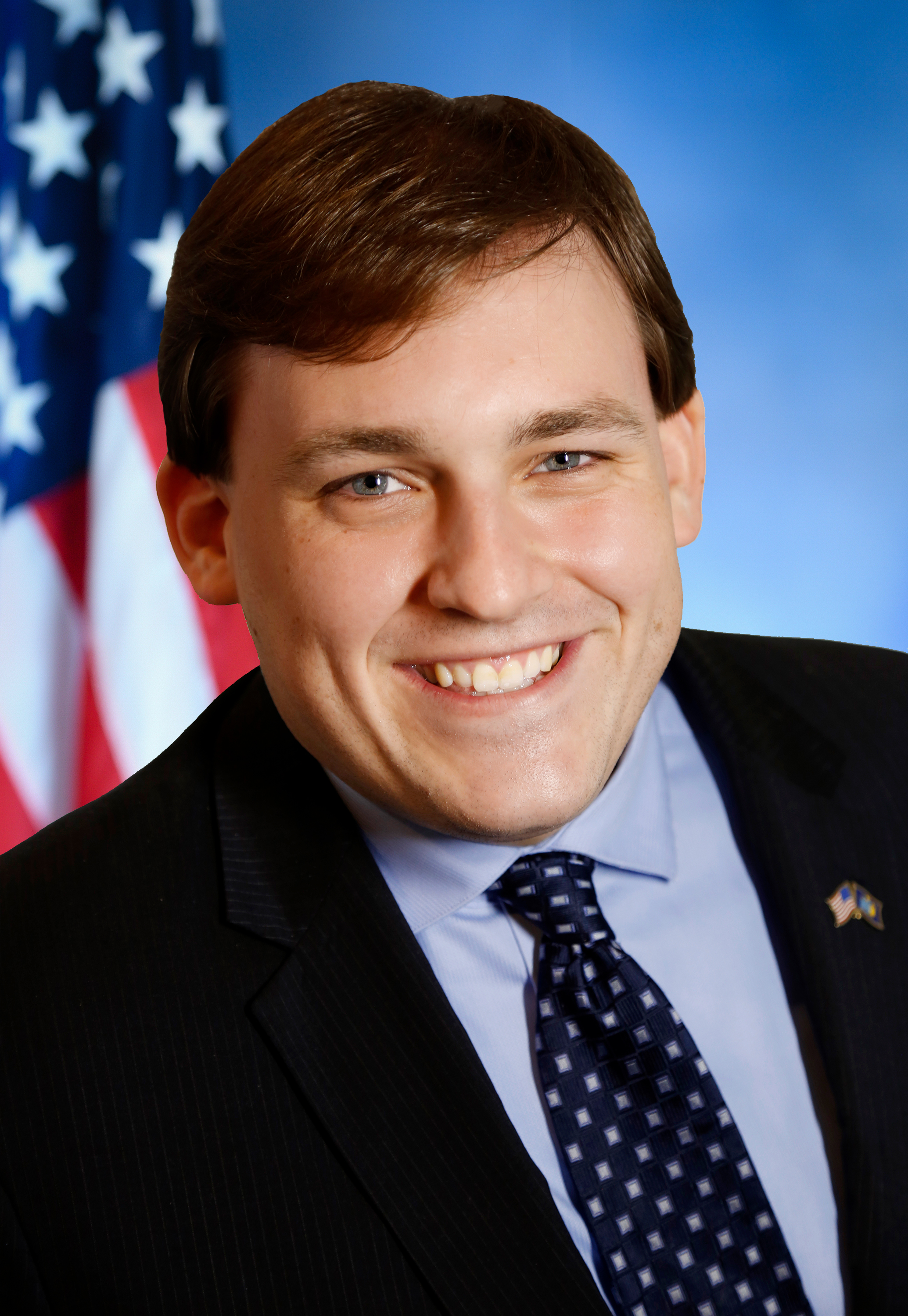

Nominee	Douglas M. Smith	Victoria A. Russell
Party	Republican	Democratic
Alliance	Conservative
Incumbent Assemblymember
Douglas M. Smith
Republican

The 5th district is located entirely within Suffolk County, including parts of the towns of Brookhaven and Islip. The incumbent is Republican Douglas M. Smith, who defeated Democrat Michael A. Reynolds to win a fourth full term with 64.5% of the vote in 2024.

=== Republican primary ===
==== Nominee ====
- Douglas M. Smith, incumbent assemblymember

=== Democratic primary ===
==== Nominee ====
- Victoria A. Russell

=== Third parties and independents ===
==== Declared ====
- Douglas M. Smith (Conservative), incumbent assemblymember

=== General election ===
==== Predictions ====
Source	Ranking	As of
State Navigate	Solid R	November 2, 2026

==== Fundraising ====
Campaign finance reports as of October 19, 2026
Candidate	Contributions	Loans	Expenditures
Douglas M. Smith (R)	$77,128.62	$0.00	$77,235.37
Victoria A. Russell (D)	$53,318.80	$0.00	$40,114.69
Source: Transparency USA

==== Results ====
2026 New York's 5th State Assembly district election
Party	Candidate	Votes	%	±%
Republican	Douglas M. Smith			
Conservative	Douglas M. Smith			
Total	Douglas M. Smith (incumbent)			
Democratic	Victoria A. Russell			
Write-in				
Total votes				

== District 6 ==
2026 New York's 6th State Assembly district election
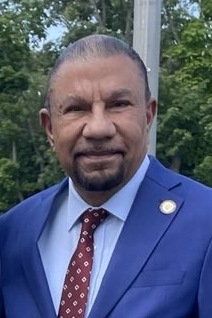

Nominee	Philip Ramos	Dennis J. Barravecchio
Party	Democratic	Republican
Alliance	Working Families
Incumbent Assemblymember
Philip Ramos
Democratic

The 6th district is located entirely within Suffolk County, including parts of the town of Islip. The incumbent is Democrat Philip Ramos, who defeated Republican Daniel Mitola to win a twelfth term with 65.71% of the vote in 2024.

=== Democratic primary ===
==== Nominee ====
- Philip Ramos, incumbent assemblymember

==== Endorsements ====
Philip Ramos

Political parties

- New York Working Families Party

=== Republican primary ===
==== Nominee ====
- Dennis J. Barravecchio

==== Disqualified ====
- Ryan S. Skelly

==== Fundraising ====
Italics indicate a disqualified candidate.

Campaign finance reports as of October 19, 2026
Candidate	Contributions	Loans	Expenditures
Dennis J. Barravecchio (R)	$0.00	$0.00	$0.00
Ryan S. Skelly	$0.00	$0.00	$0.00
Source: Transparency USA

=== Third parties and independents ===
==== Declared ====
- Philip Ramos (Working Families), incumbent assemblymember

==== Disqualified ====
- Dennis J. Barravecchio (Conservative)
- Ryan S. Skelly (Conservative)

==== Fundraising ====
Italics indicate a disqualified candidate.

Campaign finance reports as of October 19, 2026
Candidate	Contributions	Loans	Expenditures
Dennis J. Barravecchio	$0.00	$0.00	$0.00
Ryan S. Skelly	$0.00	$0.00	$0.00
Source: Transparency USA

=== General election ===
==== Predictions ====
Source	Ranking	As of
State Navigate	Solid D	November 2, 2026

==== Fundraising ====
Campaign finance reports as of October 19, 2026
Candidate	Contributions	Loans	Expenditures
Philip Ramos (D)	$64,436.56	$0.00	$59,702.99
Dennis J. Barravecchio (R)	$0.00	$0.00	$0.00
Source: Transparency USA

==== Results ====
2026 New York's 6th State Assembly district election
Party	Candidate	Votes	%	±%
Democratic	Philip Ramos			
Working Families	Philip Ramos			
Total	Philip Ramos (incumbent)			
Republican	Dennis J. Barravecchio			
Write-in				
Total votes				

== District 7 ==
2026 New York's 7th State Assembly district election
Nominee	Dawn Marie D. Lentz-Kuhn	Patricia A. Kopp
Party	Republican	Democratic
Alliance	Conservative	Working Families
Incumbent Assemblymember
Jarett Gandolfo
Republican

The 7th district is located entirely within Suffolk County, including parts of the towns of Brookhaven and Islip. The incumbent is Republican Jarett Gandolfo, who defeated Democrat Garrett J. Petersen to win a third term with 63.03% of the vote in 2024.

On February 13, 2026, members of the Suffolk County Republican Committee voted to endorse Gandolfo after he announced his run for the New York State Senate in the 8th district to succeed retiring three-term Republican incumbent Alexis Weik.

=== Republican primary ===
==== Nominee ====
- Dawn Marie D. Lentz-Kuhn

==== Declined ====
- Jarett Gandolfo, incumbent assemblymember (running for New York State Senate)

=== Democratic primary ===
==== Nominee ====
- Patricia A. Kopp

==== Endorsements ====
Patricia A. Kopp

Political parties

- New York Working Families Party

=== Third parties and independents ===
==== Declared ====
- Dawn Marie D. Lentz-Kuhn (Conservative)
- Patricia A. Kopp (Working Families)

=== General election ===
==== Predictions ====
Source	Ranking	As of
State Navigate	Solid R	November 2, 2026

==== Fundraising ====
Campaign finance reports as of October 19, 2026
Candidate	Contributions	Loans	Expenditures
Dawn Marie D. Lentz-Kuhn (R)	$329,204.17	$0.00	$277,903.72
Patricia A. Kopp (D)	$230,989.87	$0.00	$190,866.54
Source: Transparency USA

==== Results ====
2026 New York's 7th State Assembly district election
Party	Candidate	Votes	%	±%
Republican	Dawn Marie D. Lentz-Kuhn			
Conservative	Dawn Marie D. Lentz-Kuhn			
Total	Dawn Marie D. Lentz-Kuhn			
Democratic	Patricia A. Kopp			
Working Families	Patricia A. Kopp			
Total	Patricia A. Kopp			
Write-in				
Total votes				

== District 8 ==
2026 New York's 8th State Assembly district election
Nominee	Michael J. Fitzpatrick	Lynn M. Trupiano-O'Keefe
Party	Republican	Democratic
Alliance	Conservative
Incumbent Assemblymember
Michael J. Fitzpatrick
Republican

The 8th district is located entirely within Suffolk County, including the towns of Smithtown and parts of Islip. The incumbent is Republican Michael J. Fitzpatrick, who defeated Democrat Steven P. Basileo to win a twelfth term with 66.01% of the vote in 2024.

=== Republican primary ===
==== Nominee ====
- Michael J. Fitzpatrick, incumbent assemblymember

=== Democratic primary ===
==== Nominee ====
- Lynn M. Trupiano-O'Keefe

=== Third parties and independents ===
==== Declared ====
- Michael J. Fitzpatrick (Conservative), incumbent assemblymember

=== General election ===
==== Predictions ====
Source	Ranking	As of
State Navigate	Solid R	November 2, 2026

==== Fundraising ====
Campaign finance reports as of October 19, 2026
Candidate	Contributions	Loans	Expenditures
Michael J. Fitzpatrick (R)	$27,475.00	$0.00	$31,945.40
Lynn M. Trupiano-O'Keefe (D)	$12,980.03	$0.00	$17,464.27
Source: Transparency USA

==== Results ====
2026 New York's 8th State Assembly district election
Party	Candidate	Votes	%	±%
Republican	Michael J. Fitzpatrick			
Conservative	Michael J. Fitzpatrick			
Total	Michael J. Fitzpatrick (incumbent)			
Democratic	Lynn M. Trupiano-O'Keefe			
Write-in				
Total votes				

== District 9 ==
2026 New York's 9th State Assembly district election
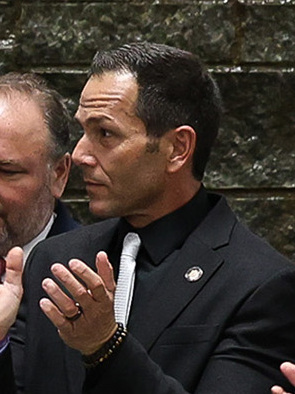

Nominee	Michael Durso	Christopher J. Walis
Party	Republican	Democratic
Alliance	Conservative
Incumbent Assemblymember
Michael Durso
Republican

The 9th district is located within Nassau and Suffolk counties, including parts of the town of Oyster Bay in Nassau County, and parts of the towns of Babylon and Islip in Suffolk County. The incumbent is Republican Michael Durso, who defeated Democrat Steven J. DellaVecchia to win a third term with 67.48% of the vote in 2024.

=== Republican primary ===
==== Nominee ====
- Michael Durso, incumbent assemblymember

=== Democratic primary ===
==== Nominee ====
- Christopher J. Walis

=== Third parties and independents ===
==== Declared ====
- Michael Durso (Conservative), incumbent assemblymember

=== General election ===
==== Predictions ====
Source	Ranking	As of
State Navigate	Solid R	November 2, 2026

==== Fundraising ====
Campaign finance reports as of October 19, 2026
Candidate	Contributions	Loans	Expenditures
Michael Durso (R)	$89,855.00	$0.00	$76,951.47
Christopher J. Walis (D)	$0.00	$0.00	$0.00
Source: Transparency USA

==== Results ====
2026 New York's 9th State Assembly district election
Party	Candidate	Votes	%	±%
Republican	Michael Durso			
Conservative	Michael Durso			
Total	Michael Durso (incumbent)			
Democratic	Christopher J. Walis			
Write-in				
Total votes				

== District 10 ==
2026 New York's 10th State Assembly district election
Nominee	Steve Stern	Tiffany L. LeGrow
Party	Democratic	Republican
Alliance		Conservative
Incumbent Assemblymember
Steve Stern
Democratic

The 10th district is located within Nassau and Suffolk counties, including parts of the town of Oyster Bay in Nassau County, and parts of the town of Huntington in Suffolk County. The incumbent is Democrat Steve Stern, who defeated Republican Aamir Sultan to win a fourth full term with 55.92% of the vote in 2024.

=== Democratic primary ===
==== Nominee ====
- Steve Stern, incumbent assemblymember

=== Republican primary ===
==== Nominee ====
- Tiffany L. LeGrow

==== Disqualified ====
- Aamir Sultan, AI expert and nominee for this district in 2024

==== Fundraising ====
Italics indicate a disqualified candidate.

Campaign finance reports as of October 19, 2026
Candidate	Contributions	Loans	Expenditures
Tiffany L. LeGrow (R)	$0.00	$0.00	$0.00
Aamir Sultan	$2,600.00	$0.00	$1,212.42
Source: Transparency USA

=== Third parties and independents ===
==== Declared ====
- Tiffany L. LeGrow (Conservative)

==== Disqualified ====
- Aamir Sultan (Conservative), AI expert and nominee for this district in 2024

==== Fundraising ====
Italics indicate a disqualified candidate.

Campaign finance reports as of October 19, 2026
Candidate	Contributions	Loans	Expenditures
Tiffany L. LeGrow (C)	$0.00	$0.00	$0.00
Aamir Sultan	$2,600.00	$0.00	$1,212.42
Source: Transparency USA

=== General election ===
==== Predictions ====
Source	Ranking	As of
State Navigate	Solid D	November 2, 2026

==== Fundraising ====
Campaign finance reports as of October 19, 2026
Candidate	Contributions	Loans	Expenditures
Steve Stern (D)	$146,338.51	$0.00	$67,204.08
Tiffany L. LeGrow (R)	$0.00	$0.00	$0.00
Source: Transparency USA

==== Results ====
2026 New York's 10th State Assembly district election
Party	Candidate	Votes	%	±%
Democratic	Steve Stern (incumbent)			
Republican	Tiffany L. LeGrow			
Conservative	Tiffany L. LeGrow			
Total	Tiffany L. LeGrow			
Write-in				
Total votes				

== District 11 ==
2026 New York's 11th State Assembly district election
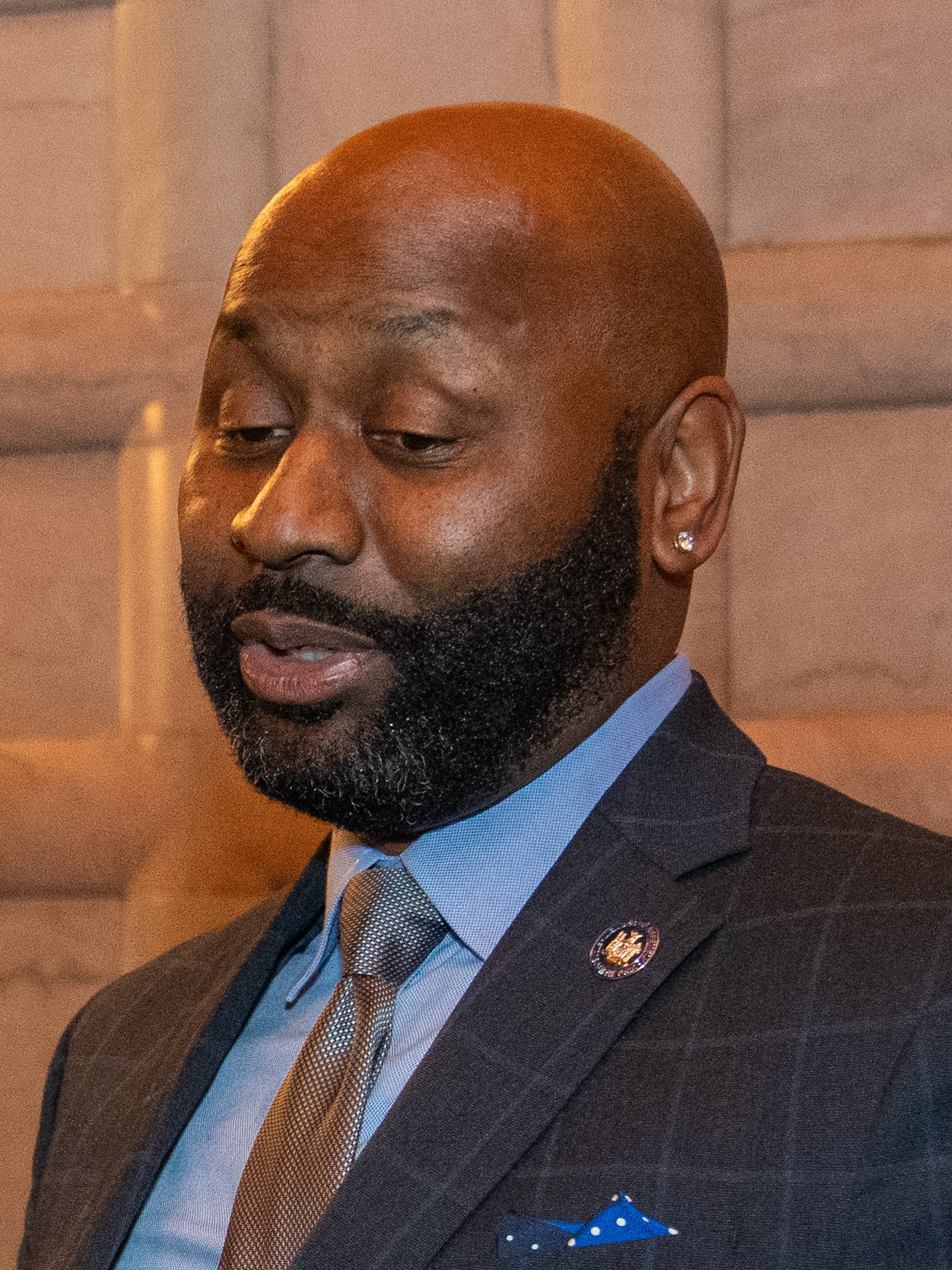

Nominee	Kwani O'Pharrow	Joseph R. Cardinale
Party	Democratic	Republican
Alliance		Conservative
Incumbent Assemblymember
Kwani O'Pharrow
Democratic

The 11th district is located within Nassau and Suffolk counties, including parts of the town of Oyster Bay in Nassau County, and parts of the town of Babylon in Suffolk County. The incumbent is Democrat Kwani O'Pharrow, who defeated Republican Joseph R. Cardinale to succeed retiring five-term Democratic incumbent Kimberly Jean-Pierre with 50.82% of the vote in 2024.

=== Democratic primary ===
==== Nominee ====
- Kwani O'Pharrow, incumbent assemblymember

=== Republican primary ===
==== Nominee ====
- Joseph R. Cardinale, nominee for this district in 2024

=== Third parties and independents ===
==== Declared ====
- Joseph R. Cardinale (Conservative), nominee for this district in 2024

=== General election ===
==== Predictions ====
Source	Ranking	As of
State Navigate	Likely D	November 2, 2026

==== Fundraising ====
Campaign finance reports as of October 19, 2026
Candidate	Contributions	Loans	Expenditures
Kwani O'Pharrow (D)	$92,581.00	$0.00	$57,717.47
Joseph R. Cardinale (R)	$145,632.00	$0.00	$71,828.81
Source: Transparency USA

==== Results ====
2026 New York's 11th State Assembly district election
Party	Candidate	Votes	%	±%
Democratic	Kwani O'Pharrow (incumbent)			
Republican	Joseph R. Cardinale			
Conservative	Joseph R. Cardinale			
Total	Joseph R. Cardinale			
Write-in				
Total votes				

== District 12 ==
2026 New York's 12th State Assembly district election
Nominee	David D. Weber Jr.	Craig G. Herskowitz
Party	Republican	Democratic
Alliance	Conservative	Working Families
Incumbent Assemblymember
Keith Brown
Republican

The 12th district is located entirely within Suffolk County, including parts of the towns of Babylon, Huntington, and Islip. The incumbent is Republican Keith Brown, who defeated Democrat Thomas J. Cox to win a third term with 57.07% of the vote in 2024.

On February 17, 2026, Brown announced he would not run for re-election to a fourth term.

=== Republican primary ===
==== Nominee ====
- David D. Weber Jr.

==== Declined ====
- Keith Brown, incumbent assemblymember

=== Democratic primary ===
==== Nominee ====
- Craig G. Herskowitz, immigration attorney

==== Endorsements ====
Craig G. Herskowitz

Political parties

- New York Working Families Party

=== Third parties and independents ===
==== Declared ====
- David D. Weber Jr. (Conservative)
- Craig G. Herskowitz (Working Families), immigration attorney

=== General election ===
==== Predictions ====
Source	Ranking	As of
State Navigate	Lean R	November 2, 2026

==== Fundraising ====
Campaign finance reports as of October 19, 2026
Candidate	Contributions	Loans	Expenditures
David D. Weber Jr. (R)	$208,365.11	$0.00	$110,732.01
Craig G. Herskowitz (D)	$250,444.72	$0.00	$264,270.81
Source: Transparency USA

==== Results ====
2026 New York's 12th State Assembly district election
Party	Candidate	Votes	%	±%
Republican	David D. Weber Jr.			
Conservative	David D. Weber Jr.			
Total	David D. Weber Jr.			
Democratic	Craig G. Herskowitz			
Working Families	Craig G. Herskowitz			
Total	Craig G. Herskowitz			
Write-in				
Total votes				

== District 13 ==
2026 New York's 13th State Assembly district election
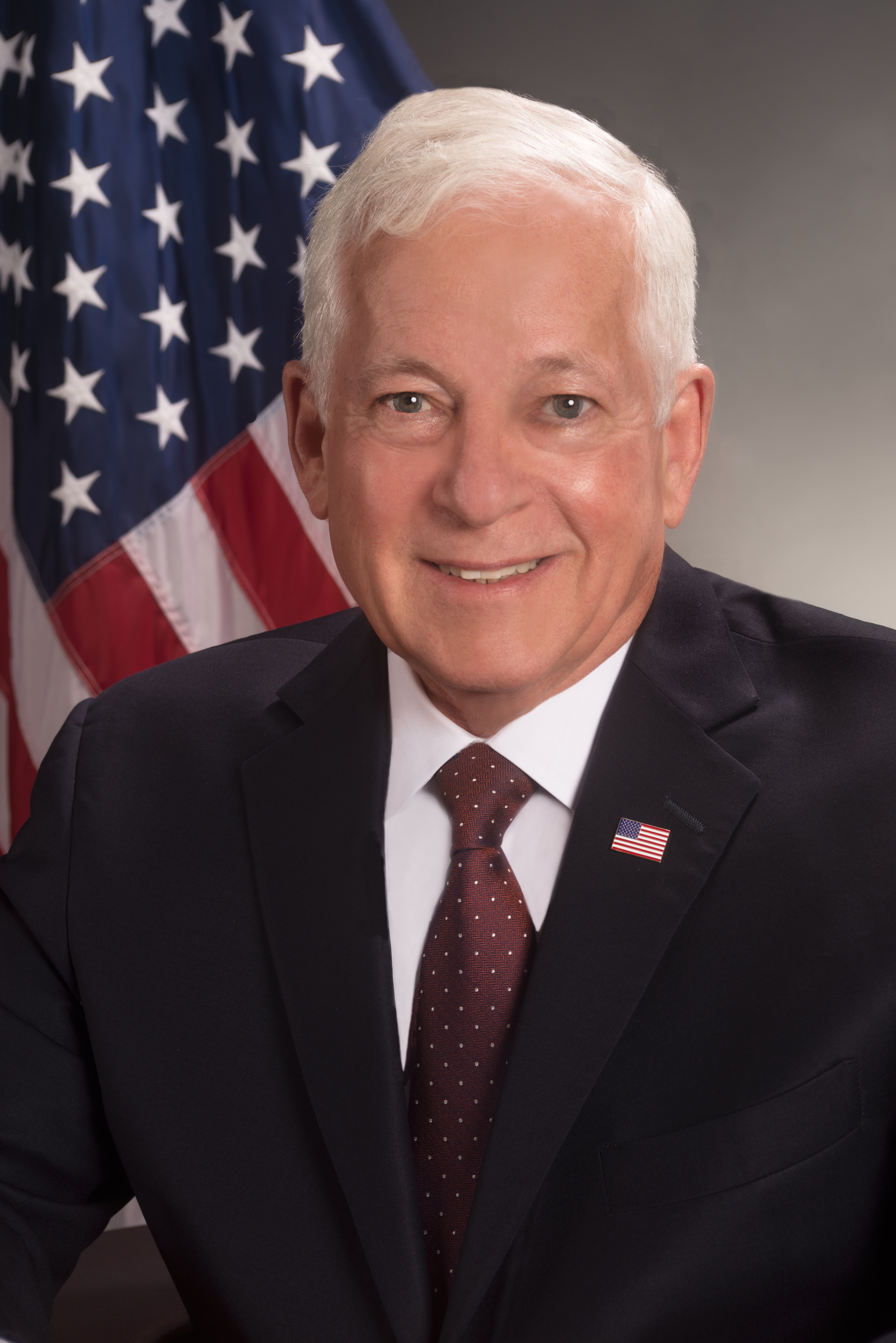

Nominee	Charles D. Lavine	Conner Phillip Dunleavy
Party	Democratic	Republican
Alliance		Conservative
Incumbent Assemblymember
Charles D. Lavine
Democratic

The 13th district is located entirely within Nassau County, including parts of the city of Glen Cove and parts of the towns of North Hempstead and Oyster Bay. The incumbent is Democrat Charles D. Lavine, who defeated Republican Ruka Anzai to win an eleventh term with 54.94% of the vote in 2024.

=== Democratic primary ===
==== Nominee ====
- Charles D. Lavine, incumbent assemblymember

=== Republican primary ===
==== Nominee ====
- Conner Phillip Dunleavy

=== Third parties and independents ===
==== Declared ====
- Conner Phillip Dunleavy (Conservative)

=== General election ===
==== Predictions ====
Source	Ranking	As of
State Navigate	Solid D	November 2, 2026

==== Fundraising ====
Campaign finance reports as of October 19, 2026
Candidate	Contributions	Loans	Expenditures
Charles D. Lavine (D)	$170,744.69	$0.00	$159,198.15
Conner Phillip Dunleavy (R)	$33,989.02	$0.00	$12,036.54
Source: Transparency USA

==== Results ====
2026 New York's 13th State Assembly district election
Party	Candidate	Votes	%	±%
Democratic	Charles D. Lavine (incumbent)			
Republican	Conner Phillip Dunleavy			
Conservative	Conner Phillip Dunleavy			
Total	Conner Phillip Dunleavy			
Write-in				
Total votes				

== District 14 ==
2026 New York's 14th State Assembly district election

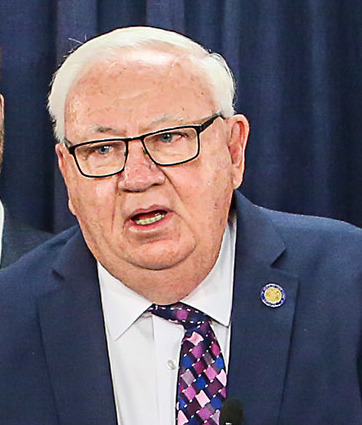
Nominee	Shannon R. Fredericks	John Brooks
Party	Republican	Democratic
Alliance	Conservative
Incumbent Assemblymember
David McDonough
Republican

The 14th district is located entirely within Nassau County, including parts of the town of Hempstead. The incumbent is Republican David McDonough, who defeated Democrat Ellen M. Lederer DeFrancesco to win a twelfth full term with 63.97% of the vote in 2024.

On February 21, 2026, McDonough announced he would not run for re-election to a thirteenth full term.

=== Republican primary ===
==== Nominee ====
- Shannon R. Fredericks, former regional coordinator for the New York State Senate Republican Conference in Nassau County

==== Declined ====
- David McDonough, incumbent assemblymember

=== Democratic primary ===
==== Nominee ====
- John Brooks, former New York state senator from the 8th district (2017–2022)

=== Third parties and independents ===
==== Declared ====
- Shannon R. Fredericks (Conservative), former regional coordinator for the New York State Senate Republican Conference in Nassau County

=== General election ===
==== Predictions ====
Source	Ranking	As of
State Navigate	Solid R	November 2, 2026

==== Fundraising ====
Campaign finance reports as of October 19, 2026
Candidate	Contributions	Loans	Expenditures
Shannon R. Fredericks (R)	$156,800.47	$0.00	$37,749.45
John Brooks (D)	$97,477.04	$0.00	$100,707.05
Source: Transparency USA

==== Results ====
2026 New York's 14th State Assembly district election
Party	Candidate	Votes	%	±%
Republican	Shannon R. Fredericks			
Conservative	Shannon R. Fredericks			
Total	Shannon R. Fredericks			
Democratic	John Brooks			
Write-in				
Total votes				

== District 15 ==
2026 New York's 15th State Assembly district election
Nominee	Paolo A. Pironi	Dean Tarulli
Party	Republican	Democratic
Alliance	Conservative
Incumbent Assemblymember
Jake Blumencranz
Republican

The 15th district is located entirely within Nassau County, including parts of the city of Glen Cove, and parts of the towns of Hempstead and Oyster Bay. The incumbent is Republican Jake Blumencranz, who defeated Democrat William L. Murphy to win a second term with 57.95% of the vote in 2024.

On April 13, 2026, Blumencranz announced that he would run for the New York State Senate in the 7th district to succeed retiring two-consecutive-term (five-overall-term) Republican incumbent Jack Martins, after Martins announced he would not run for a third consecutive term.

=== Republican primary ===
==== Nominee ====
- Paolo A. Pironi, local home builder

==== Declined ====
- Jake Blumencranz, incumbent assemblymember (running for New York State Senate)

=== Democratic primary ===
==== Nominee ====
- Dean Tarulli, New York City deputy director of Coastal Resilience

=== Third parties and independents ===
==== Declared ====
- Paolo A. Pironi (Conservative), local home builder

=== General election ===
==== Predictions ====
Source	Ranking	As of
State Navigate	Likely R	November 2, 2026

==== Fundraising ====
Campaign finance reports as of October 19, 2026
Candidate	Contributions	Loans	Expenditures
Paolo A. Pironi (R)	$114,595.76	$0.00	$20,122.65
Dean Tarulli (D)	$15,498.70	$0.00	$29,870.59
Source: Transparency USA

==== Results ====
2026 New York's 15th State Assembly district election
Party	Candidate	Votes	%	±%
Republican	Paolo A. Pironi			
Conservative	Paolo A. Pironi			
Total	Paolo A. Pironi			
Democratic	Dean Tarulli			
Write-in				
Total votes				

== District 16 ==
2026 New York's 16th State Assembly district election
Nominee	David Hassid	Kim Keiserman
Party	Republican	Democratic
Alliance	Conservative
Incumbent Assemblymember
Daniel Norber
Republican

The 16th district is located entirely within Nassau County, including parts of the town of North Hempstead. The incumbent is Republican Daniel Norber, who defeated two-term Democratic incumbent Gina Sillitti with 50.45% of the vote in 2024.

On February 20, 2026, Norber announced he would not run for re-election to a second term.

=== Republican primary ===
==== Nominee ====
- David Hassid, legislative aide

==== Declined ====
- Daniel Norber, incumbent assemblymember

=== Democratic primary ===
==== Nominee ====
- Kim Keiserman, nominee for the New York State Senate's 7th district in 2024

=== Third parties and independents ===
==== Declared ====
- David Hassid (Conservative), legislative aide

=== General election ===
==== Predictions ====
Source	Ranking	As of
State Navigate	Very Likely R	November 2, 2026

==== Fundraising ====
Campaign finance reports as of October 19, 2026
Candidate	Contributions	Loans	Expenditures
David Hassid (R)	$9,917.00	$0.00	$420.84
Kim Keiserman (D)	$711,079.42	$0.00	$621,200.60
Source: Transparency USA

==== Results ====
2026 New York's 16th State Assembly district election
Party	Candidate	Votes	%	±%
Republican	David Hassid			
Conservative	David Hassid			
Total	David Hassid			
Democratic	Kim Keiserman			
Write-in				
Total votes				

== District 17 ==
2026 New York's 17th State Assembly district election
Nominee	John Mikulin	Sunita J. Lofters
Party	Republican	Democratic
Alliance	Conservative
Incumbent Assemblymember
John Mikulin
Republican

The 17th district is located entirely within Nassau County, including parts of the towns of Hempstead and Oyster Bay. The incumbent is Republican John Mikulin, who defeated Democrat Harpreet S. Toor to win a fourth full term with 65.26% of the vote in 2024.

=== Republican primary ===
==== Nominee ====
- John Mikulin, incumbent assemblymember

=== Democratic primary ===
==== Nominee ====
- Sunita J. Lofters, bar owner

=== Third parties and independents ===
==== Declared ====
- John Mikulin (Conservative), incumbent assemblymember

=== General election ===
==== Predictions ====
Source	Ranking	As of
State Navigate	Solid R	November 2, 2026

==== Fundraising ====
Campaign finance reports as of October 19, 2026
Candidate	Contributions	Loans	Expenditures
John Mikulin (R)	$27,310.09	$0.00	$26,169.91
Sunita J. Lofters (D)	$0.00	$0.00	$0.00
Source: Transparency USA

==== Results ====
2026 New York's 17th State Assembly district election
Party	Candidate	Votes	%	±%
Republican	John Mikulin			
Conservative	John Mikulin			
Total	John Mikulin (incumbent)			
Democratic	Sunita J. Lofters			
Write-in				
Total votes				

== District 18 ==
2026 New York's 18th State Assembly district election
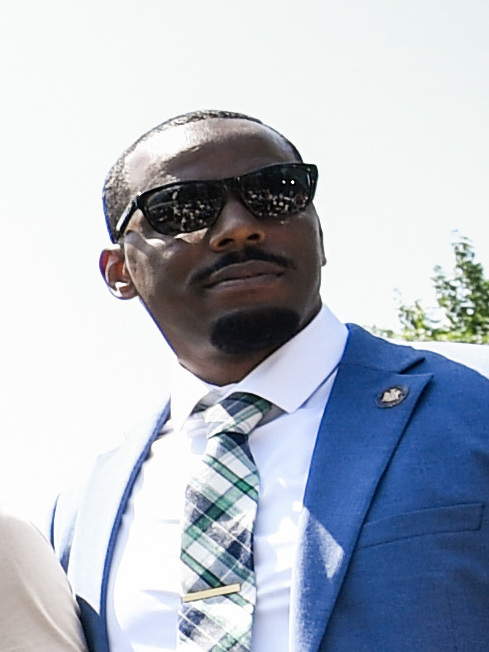

Nominee	Noah Burroughs	Charlene Jackson
Party	Democratic	Republican
Alliance	Working Families	Conservative
Incumbent Assemblymember
Noah Burroughs
Democratic

The 18th district is located entirely within Nassau County, including parts of the town of Hempstead. The incumbent is Democrat Noah Burroughs, who defeated Republican Danielle Samantha Smikle to succeed retiring three-term Democratic incumbent Taylor Darling, who unsuccessfully ran for the New York State Senate for the 6th district, with 82.04% of the vote in 2024.

=== Democratic primary ===
==== Nominee ====
- Noah Burroughs, incumbent assemblymember

==== Endorsements ====
Noah Burroughs

Political parties

- New York Working Families Party

=== Republican primary ===
==== Nominee ====
- Charlene Jackson

=== Third parties and independents ===
==== Declared ====
- Charlene Jackson (Conservative)
- Noah Burroughs (Working Families), incumbent assemblymember

=== General election ===
==== Predictions ====
Source	Ranking	As of
State Navigate	Solid D	November 2, 2026

==== Fundraising ====
Campaign finance reports as of October 19, 2026
Candidate	Contributions	Loans	Expenditures
Noah Burroughs (D)	$127,723.24	$0.00	$69,311.20
Charlene Jackson (R)	$90,768.54	$0.00	$61,803.98
Source: Transparency USA

==== Results ====
2026 New York's 18th State Assembly district election
Party	Candidate	Votes	%	±%
Democratic	Noah Burroughs			
Working Families	Noah Burroughs			
Total	Noah Burroughs (incumbent)			
Republican	Charlene Jackson			
Conservative	Charlene Jackson			
Total	Charlene Jackson			
Write-in				
Total votes				

== District 19 ==
2026 New York's 19th State Assembly district election
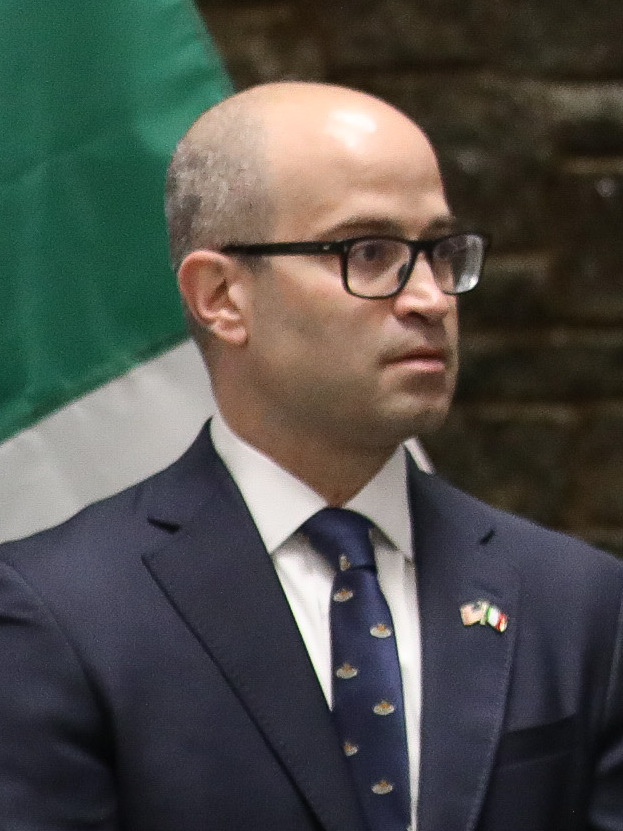

Nominee	Ed Ra	Colleen Connaughton
Party	Republican	Democratic
Alliance	Conservative
Incumbent Assemblymember
Ed Ra
Republican

The 19th district is located entirely within Nassau County, including parts of the towns of Hempstead and North Hempstead. The incumbent is Republican Ed Ra, who defeated Democrat Sanjeev Kumar Jindal to win an eighth term with 64.29% of the vote in 2024.

=== Republican primary ===
==== Nominee ====
- Ed Ra, incumbent assemblymember

=== Democratic primary ===
==== Nominee ====
- Colleen Connaughton

=== Third parties and independents ===
==== Declared ====
- Ed Ra (Conservative), incumbent assemblymember

=== General election ===
==== Predictions ====
Source	Ranking	As of
State Navigate	Solid R	November 2, 2026

==== Fundraising ====
Campaign finance reports as of October 19, 2026
Candidate	Contributions	Loans	Expenditures
Ed Ra (R)	$188,001.13	$0.00	$178,818.29
Colleen Connaughton (D)	$2,380.66	$0.00	$82.02
Source: Transparency USA

==== Results ====
2026 New York's 19th State Assembly district election
Party	Candidate	Votes	%	±%
Republican	Ed Ra			
Conservative	Ed Ra			
Total	Ed Ra (incumbent)			
Democratic	Colleen Connaughton			
Write-in				
Total votes				

== District 20 ==
2026 New York's 20th State Assembly district election
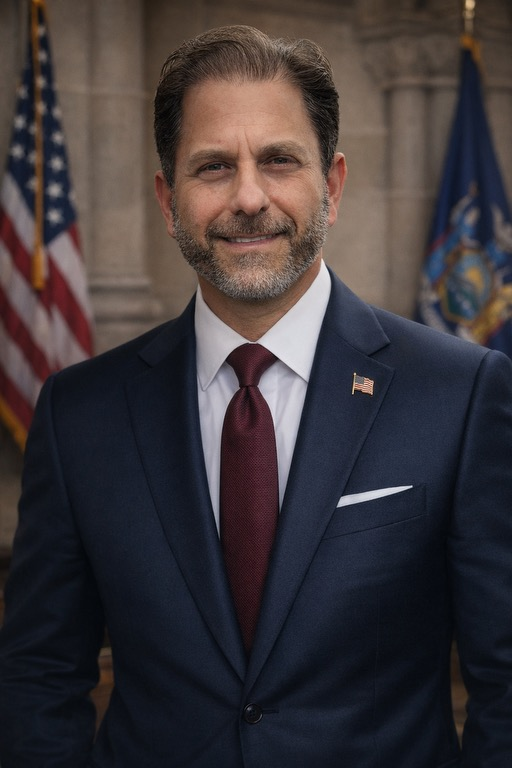

Nominee	Ari Brown	Meir Fischer
Party	Republican	Democratic
Alliance	Conservative
Incumbent Assemblymember
Ari Brown
Republican

The 20th district is located entirely within Nassau County, including the city of Long Beach and parts of the town of Hempstead. The incumbent is Republican Ari Brown, who defeated Democrat Tina M. Posterli to win a second full term with 62.58% of the vote in 2024.

=== Republican primary ===
==== Nominee ====
- Ari Brown, incumbent assemblymember

=== Democratic primary ===
==== Nominee ====
- Meir Fischer

=== Third parties and independents ===
==== Declared ====
- Ari Brown (Conservative), incumbent assemblymember

=== General election ===
==== Predictions ====
Source	Ranking	As of
State Navigate	Solid R	November 2, 2026

==== Fundraising ====
Campaign finance reports as of October 19, 2026
Candidate	Contributions	Loans	Expenditures
Ari Brown (R)	$172,712.73	$0.00	$132,672.65
Meir Fischer (D)	$2,031.63	$0.00	$1,447.29
Source: Transparency USA

==== Results ====
2026 New York's 20th State Assembly district election
Party	Candidate	Votes	%	±%
Republican	Ari Brown			
Conservative	Ari Brown			
Total	Ari Brown (incumbent)			
Democratic	Meir Fischer			
Write-in				
Total votes				

== District 21 ==
2026 New York's 21st State Assembly district election
Nominee	Judy Griffin	Irene V. Villacci
Party	Democratic	Republican
Alliance		Conservative
Incumbent Assemblymember
Judy Griffin
Democratic

The 21st district is located entirely within Nassau County, including parts of the town of Hempstead. The incumbent is Democrat Judy Griffin, who defeated one-consecutive-term (five-overall-term) Republican incumbent Brian F. Curran to win a third overall term with 51.82% of the vote in 2024.

=== Democratic primary ===
==== Nominee ====
- Judy Griffin, incumbent assemblymember

=== Republican primary ===
==== Nominee ====
- Irene V. Villacci, estate attorney

=== Third parties and independents ===
==== Declared ====
- Irene V. Villacci (Conservative), estate attorney

=== General election ===
==== Predictions ====
Source	Ranking	As of
State Navigate	Very Likely D	November 2, 2026

==== Fundraising ====
Campaign finance reports as of October 19, 2026
Candidate	Contributions	Loans	Expenditures
Judy Griffin (D)	$275,298.89	$0.00	$92,939.24
Irene V. Villacci (R)	$148,533.94	$0.00	$16,448.78
Source: Transparency USA

==== Results ====
2026 New York's 21st State Assembly district election
Party	Candidate	Votes	%	±%
Democratic	Judy Griffin (incumbent)			
Republican	Irene V. Villacci			
Conservative	Irene V. Villacci			
Total	Irene V. Villacci			
Write-in				
Total votes				

== District 22 ==
2026 New York's 22nd State Assembly district election
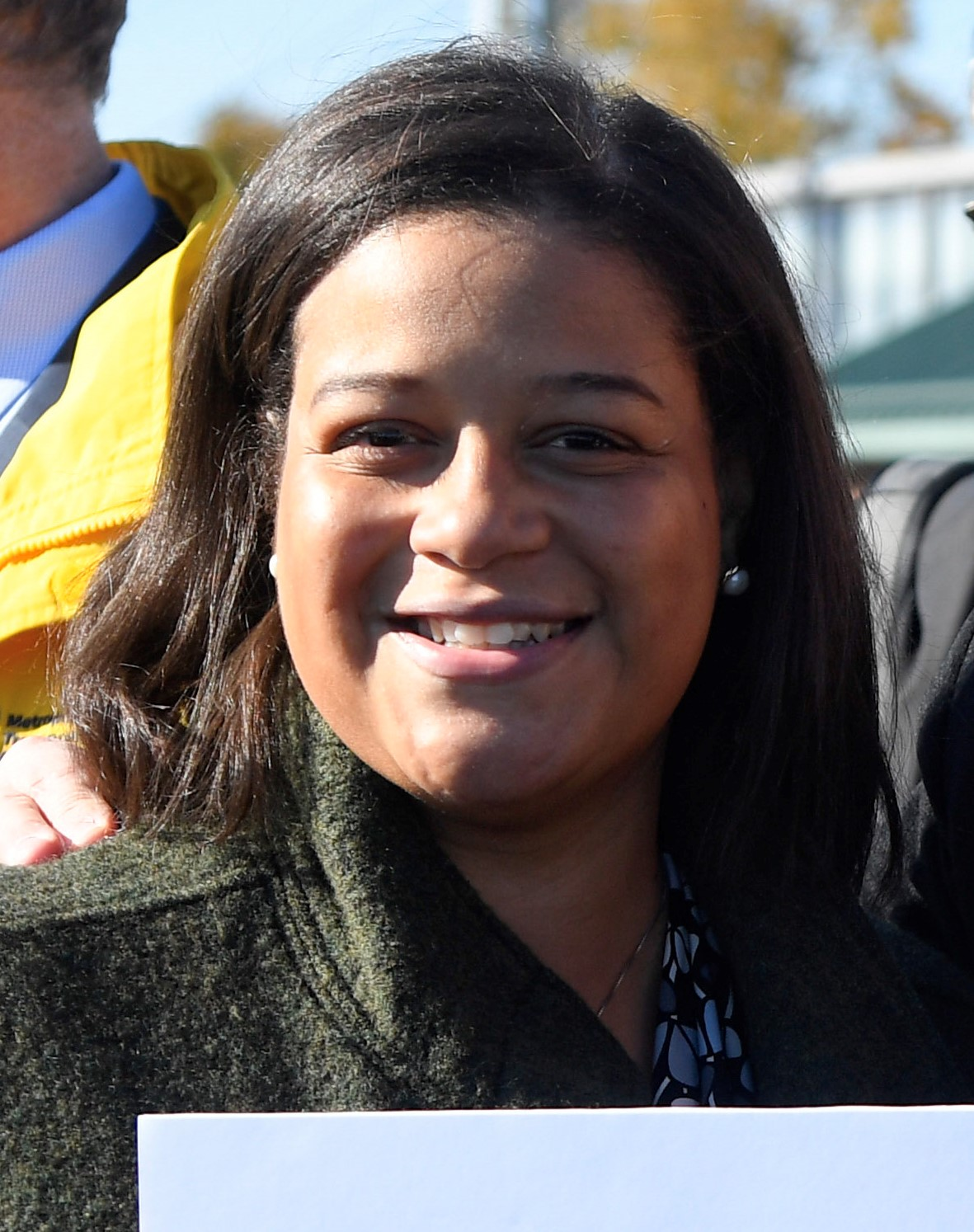

Nominee	Michaelle C. Solages	Robert G. Inzerillo
Party	Democratic	Republican
Alliance	Working Families	Conservative
Incumbent Assemblymember
Michaelle C. Solages
Democratic

The 22nd district is located entirely within Nassau County, including parts of the town of Hempstead. The incumbent is Democrat Michaelle C. Solages, who defeated Republican Ian Joseph Bergstrom to win a seventh term with 61.97% of the vote in 2024.

=== Democratic primary ===
==== Nominee ====
- Michaelle C. Solages, incumbent assemblymember

==== Endorsements ====
Michaelle C. Solages

Political parties

- New York Working Families Party

=== Republican primary ===
==== Nominee ====
- Robert G. Inzerillo

=== Third parties and independents ===
==== Declared ====
- Robert G. Inzerillo (Conservative)
- Michaelle C. Solages (Working Families), incumbent assemblymember

=== General election ===
==== Predictions ====
Source	Ranking	As of
State Navigate	Solid D	November 2, 2026

==== Fundraising ====
Campaign finance reports as of October 19, 2026
Candidate	Contributions	Loans	Expenditures
Michaelle C. Solages (D)	$587,242.20	$0.00	$230,569.46
Robert G. Inzerillo (R)	$15,450.00	$0.00	$8,626.11
Source: Transparency USA

==== Results ====
2026 New York's 22nd State Assembly district election
Party	Candidate	Votes	%	±%
Democratic	Michaelle C. Solages			
Working Families	Michaelle C. Solages			
Total	Michaelle C. Solages (incumbent)			
Republican	Robert G. Inzerillo			
Conservative	Robert G. Inzerillo			
Total	Robert G. Inzerillo			
Write-in				
Total votes				

== District 23 ==
2026 New York's 23rd State Assembly district election
Nominee	Pesach Osina	Thomas P. Sullivan
Party	Democratic	Republican
Alliance	Community First	Conservative; We The People
Incumbent Assemblymember
Stacey Pheffer Amato
Democratic

The 23rd district is located entirely within Queens in New York City, including parts of the community board districts of Community Board 9, Community Board 10, and Community Board 14. The incumbent is Democrat Stacey Pheffer Amato, who defeated Republican Thomas P. Sullivan to win a fifth term with 51.57% of the vote in 2024.

On November 17, 2025, Pheffer Amato announced she would not run for re-election to a sixth term.

=== Democratic primary ===
==== Nominee ====
- Pesach Osina, Queens representative of the Commission on Racial Equity (CORE) and candidate for New York City's 31st City Council district in the 2013 special election and 2021

==== Eliminated in primary ====
- Michael G. Scala, attorney, board president of Queens Defenders, candidate for New York's 5th congressional district in 2012, nominee for New York City's 32nd City Council district in 2017, and candidate for New York City's 32nd City Council district in 2021

==== Disqualified ====
- Electra Holmes

==== Declined ====
- Jeanette Garramone, Democratic district leader for the 23rd State Assembly district
- Stacey Pheffer Amato, incumbent assemblymember (endorsed Osina)
- Felicia Singh, educator and nominee for New York City's 32nd City Council district in 2021

==== Endorsements ====
Pesach Osina

State legislators

- Stacey Pheffer Amato, state assemblymember from the 23rd district (2017–present)

Labor unions

- New York State United Teachers

==== Fundraising ====
Italics indicate a disqualified candidate.

Campaign finance reports as of October 19, 2026
Candidate	Contributions	Loans	Expenditures
Pesach Osina (D)	$518,098.03	$0.00	$390,142.53
Michael G. Scala (D)	$160,428.67	$4,000.00	$163,397.91
Electra Holmes	$0.00	$0.00	$0.00
Source: Transparency USA

==== Results ====
2026 New York's 23rd State Assembly district Democratic primary election
Party	Candidate	Votes	%
Democratic	Pesach Osina	3,445	60.65%
Democratic	Michael G. Scala	2,201	38.75%
Write-in		34	0.60%
Total votes		5,680	100.00%

=== Republican primary ===
==== Nominee ====
- Thomas P. Sullivan, perennial candidate

=== Third parties and independents ===
==== Declared ====
- Pesach Osina (Community First), Queens representative of the Commission on Racial Equity (CORE) and candidate for New York City's 31st City Council district in the 2013 special election and 2021
- Thomas P. Sullivan (Conservative/We The People), perennial candidate

==== Disqualified ====
- Michael G. Scala (People Over Politics), attorney, board president of Queens Defenders, candidate for New York's 5th congressional district in 2012, nominee for New York City's 32nd City Council district in 2017, and candidate for New York City's 32nd City Council district in 2021

=== General election ===
==== Predictions ====
Source	Ranking	As of
State Navigate	Likely D	November 2, 2026

==== Fundraising ====
Italics indicate a disqualified candidate.

Campaign finance reports as of October 19, 2026
Candidate	Contributions	Loans	Expenditures
Pesach Osina (D)	$518,098.03	$0.00	$390,142.53
Thomas P. Sullivan (R)	$409,381.14	$0.00	$391,928.37
Michael G. Scala	$160,428.67	$4,000.00	$163,397.91
Source: Transparency USA

==== Results ====
2026 New York's 23rd State Assembly district election
Party	Candidate	Votes	%	±%
Democratic	Pesach Osina			
Community First	Pesach Osina			
Total	Pesach Osina			
Republican	Thomas P. Sullivan			
Conservative	Thomas P. Sullivan			
We The People	Thomas P. Sullivan			
Total	Thomas P. Sullivan			
Write-in				
Total votes				

== District 24 ==
2026 New York's 24th State Assembly district election
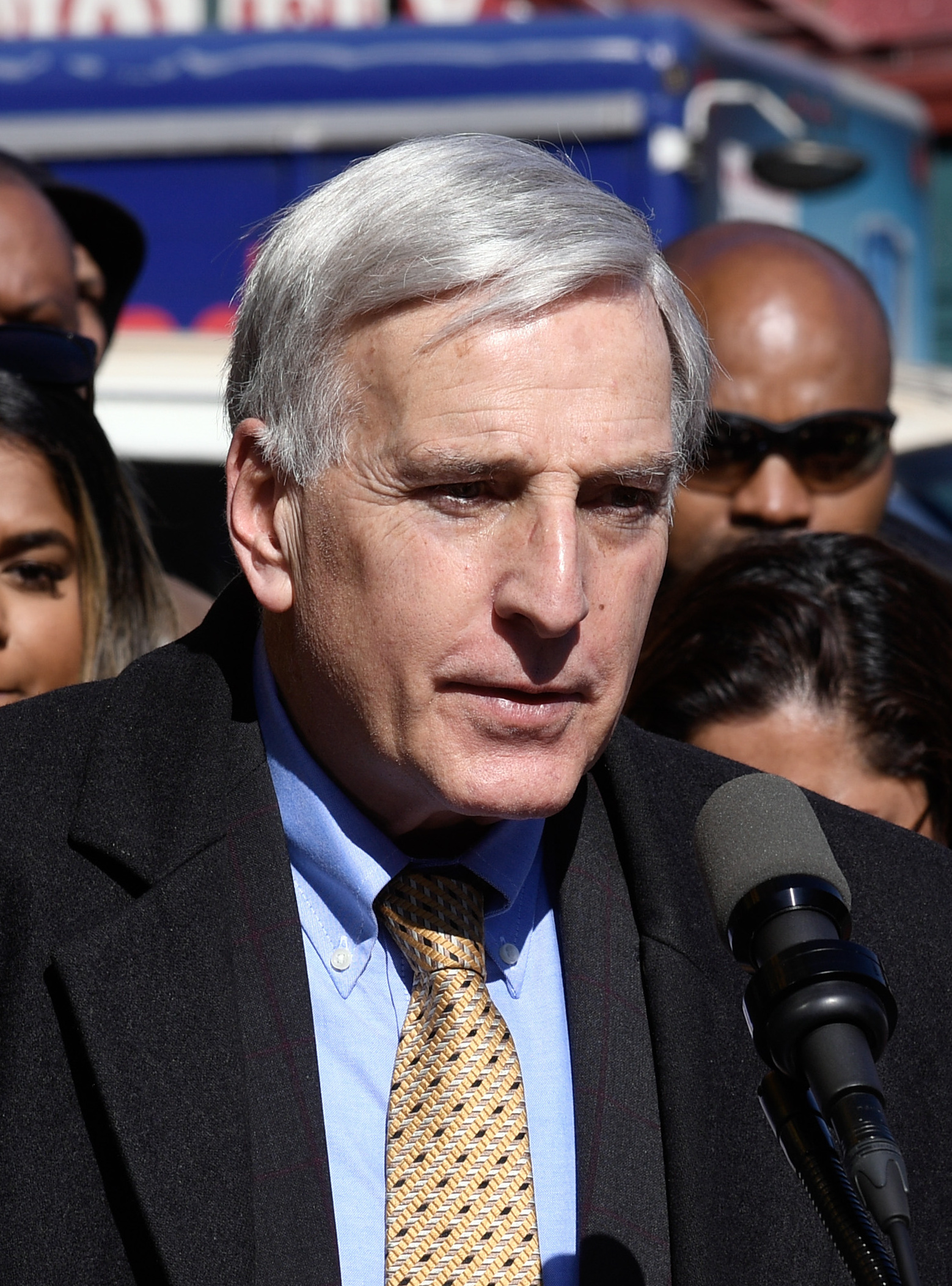

Nominee	David Weprin	Welson Chang
Party	Democratic	Republican
Alliance		Queens United
Incumbent Assemblymember
David Weprin
Democratic

The 24th district is located entirely within Queens in New York City, including parts of the community board districts of Community Board 8, Community Board 9, Community Board 10, Community Board 11, Community Board 12, and Community Board 13. The incumbent is Democrat David Weprin, who defeated Republican Ruben D. Cruz II to win an eighth full term with 61.09% of the vote in 2024.

=== Democratic primary ===
==== Nominee ====
- David Weprin, incumbent assemblymember

==== Disqualified ====
- Mahtab Khan, volunteer on Zohran Mamdani's campaign for New York City mayor in 2025 and candidate for district leader for the 24th State Assembly district in 2020

==== Endorsements ====
Mahtab Khan

Organizations

- Run for Something

==== Fundraising ====
Italics indicate a disqualified candidate.

Campaign finance reports as of October 19, 2026
Candidate	Contributions	Loans	Expenditures
David Weprin (D)	$66,150.00	$0.00	$14,830.94
Mahtab Khan	$7,465.30	$0.00	$7,488.24
Source: Transparency USA

=== Republican primary ===
==== Nominee ====
- Welson Chang

=== Third parties and independents ===
==== Declared ====
- Welson Chang (Queens United)

=== General election ===
==== Predictions ====
Source	Ranking	As of
State Navigate	Solid D	November 2, 2026

==== Fundraising ====
Campaign finance reports as of October 19, 2026
Candidate	Contributions	Loans	Expenditures
David Weprin (D)	$66,150.00	$0.00	$14,830.94
Welson Chang (R)	$0.00	$0.00	$0.00
Source: Transparency USA

==== Results ====
2026 New York's 24th State Assembly district election
Party	Candidate	Votes	%	±%
Democratic	David Weprin (incumbent)			
Republican	Welson Chang			
Queens United	Welson Chang			
Total	Welson Chang			
Write-in				
Total votes				

== District 25 ==
2026 New York's 25th State Assembly district election
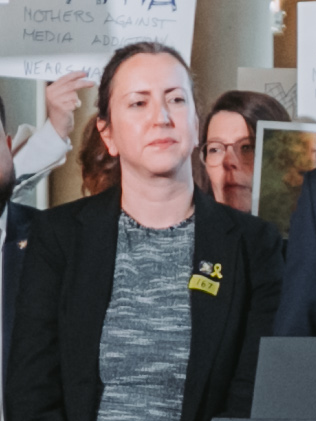
Nominee	Nily Rozic
Party	Democratic
Incumbent Assemblymember
Nily Rozic
Democratic

The 25th district is located entirely within Queens in New York City, including parts of the community board districts of Community Board 7, Community Board 8, and Community Board 11. The incumbent is Democrat Nily Rozic, who defeated Republican Kenneth C. Paek to win a seventh term with 52.91% of the vote in 2024.

=== Democratic primary ===
==== Nominee ====
- Nily Rozic, incumbent assemblymember

=== Republican primary ===
==== Disqualified ====
- Kenneth C. Paek, nominee for this district in 2024

=== Third parties and independents ===
==== Disqualified ====
- Kenneth C. Paek (4 Our Immigrants), Republican nominee for this district in 2024

=== General election ===
==== Predictions ====
Source	Ranking	As of
State Navigate	Very Likely D	November 2, 2026

==== Fundraising ====
Italics indicate a disqualified candidate.

Campaign finance reports as of October 19, 2026
Candidate	Contributions	Loans	Expenditures
Nily Rozic (D)	$115,258.44	$0.00	$27,841.76
Kenneth C. Paek	$7,720.00	$0.00	$7,728.00
Source: Transparency USA

==== Results ====
2026 New York's 25th State Assembly district election
Party	Candidate	Votes	%	±%
Democratic	Nily Rozic (incumbent)			
Write-in				
Total votes				

== District 26 ==
2026 New York's 26th State Assembly district election
Nominee	Edward Braunstein	Robert J. Speranza
Party	Democratic	Republican
Incumbent Assemblymember
Edward Braunstein
Democratic

The 26th district is located entirely within Queens in New York City, including parts of the community board districts of Community Board 7, Community Board 11, and Community Board 13. The incumbent is Democrat Edward Braunstein, who defeated Conservative Robert J. Speranza to win an eighth term with 67.72% of the vote in 2024.

=== Democratic primary ===
==== Nominee ====
- Edward Braunstein, incumbent assemblymember

=== Republican primary ===
==== Nominee ====
- Robert J. Speranza, retired NYPD officer and Conservative nominee for this district in 2024

==== Eliminated in primary ====
- Philip Sean Grillo, January 6 United States Capitol attack rioter

==== Fundraising ====
Campaign finance reports as of October 19, 2026
Candidate	Contributions	Loans	Expenditures
Robert J. Speranza (R)	$114,364.79	$2,415.93	$84,580.88
Philip Sean Grillo (R)	$6,712.00	$0.00	$0.00
Source: Transparency USA

==== Results ====
2026 New York's 26th State Assembly district Republican primary election
Party	Candidate	Votes	%
Republican	Robert J. Speranza	809	61.80%
Republican	Philip Sean Grillo	491	37.51%
Write-in		9	0.69%
Total votes		1,309	100.00%

=== Third parties and independents ===
==== Disqualified ====
- Robert J. Speranza (Conservative/4 Our Immigrants), retired NYPD officer and nominee for this district in 2024

=== General election ===
==== Predictions ====
Source	Ranking	As of
State Navigate	Solid D	November 2, 2026

==== Fundraising ====
Campaign finance reports as of October 19, 2026
Candidate	Contributions	Loans	Expenditures
Edward Braunstein (D)	$323,144.65	$0.00	$175,786.20
Robert J. Speranza (R)	$114,364.79	$2,415.93	$84,580.88
Source: Transparency USA

==== Results ====
2026 New York's 26th State Assembly district election
Party	Candidate	Votes	%	±%
Democratic	Edward Braunstein (incumbent)			
Republican	Robert J. Speranza			
Write-in				
Total votes				

== District 27 ==
2026 New York's 27th State Assembly district election
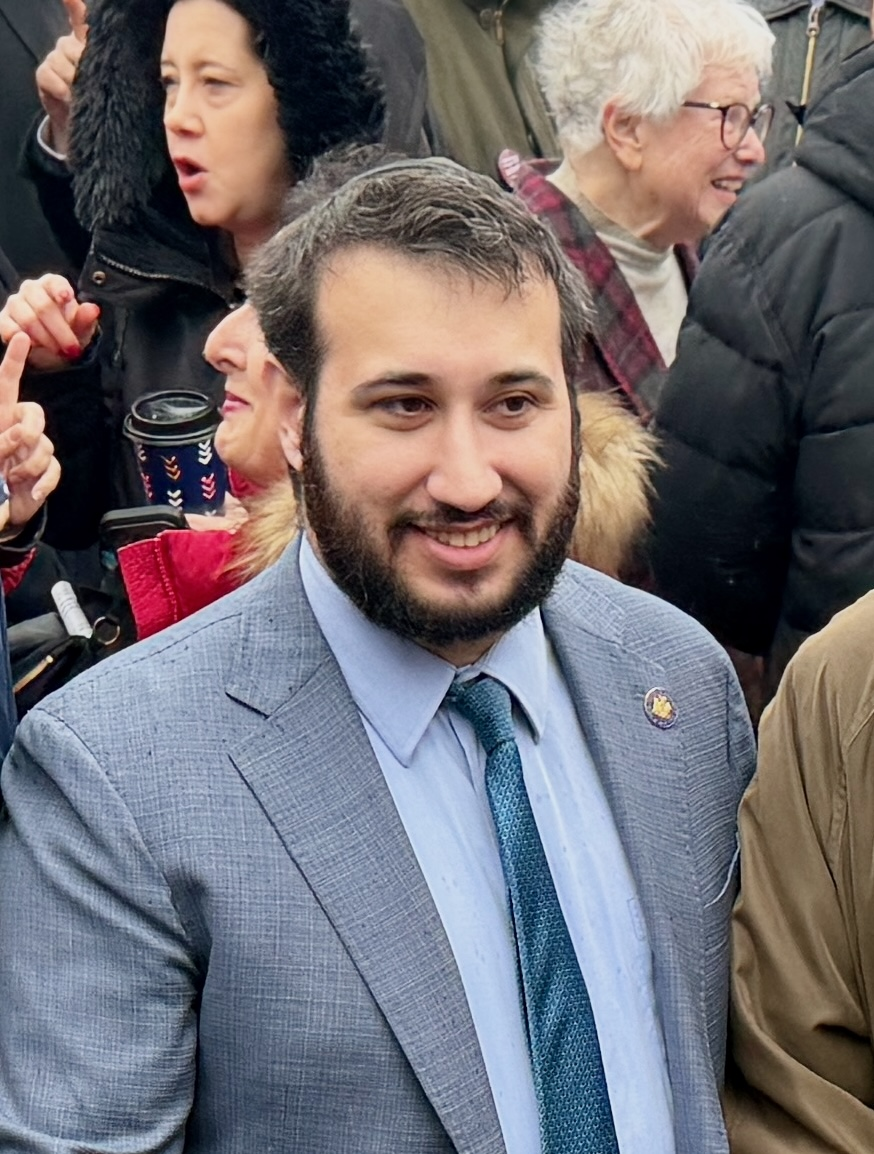
Nominee	Sam Berger
Party	Democratic
Alliance	Conservative
Incumbent Assemblymember
Sam Berger
Democratic

The 27th district is located entirely within Queens in New York City, including parts of the community board districts of Community Board 6, Community Board 7, Community Board 8, and Community Board 9. The incumbent is Democrat Sam Berger, who defeated Republican Angelo King to win a first full term with 57.26% of the vote in 2024.

=== Democratic primary ===
==== Nominee ====
- Sam Berger, incumbent assemblymember

=== Republican primary ===
==== Disqualified ====
- Alfredo Centola, Whitestone civic leader

=== Third parties and independents ===
==== Declared ====
- Sam Berger (Conservative), incumbent assemblymember

=== General election ===
==== Predictions ====
Source	Ranking	As of
State Navigate	Uncontested D	November 2, 2026

==== Fundraising ====
Italics indicate a disqualified candidate.

Campaign finance reports as of October 19, 2026
Candidate	Contributions	Loans	Expenditures
Sam Berger (D)	$102,507.02	$0.00	$99,692.72
Alfredo Centola	$0.00	$0.00	$0.00
Source: Transparency USA

==== Results ====
2026 New York's 27th State Assembly district election
Party	Candidate	Votes	%	±%
Democratic	Sam Berger			
Conservative	Sam Berger			
Total	Sam Berger (incumbent)			
Write-in				
Total votes				

== District 28 ==
2026 New York's 28th State Assembly district election
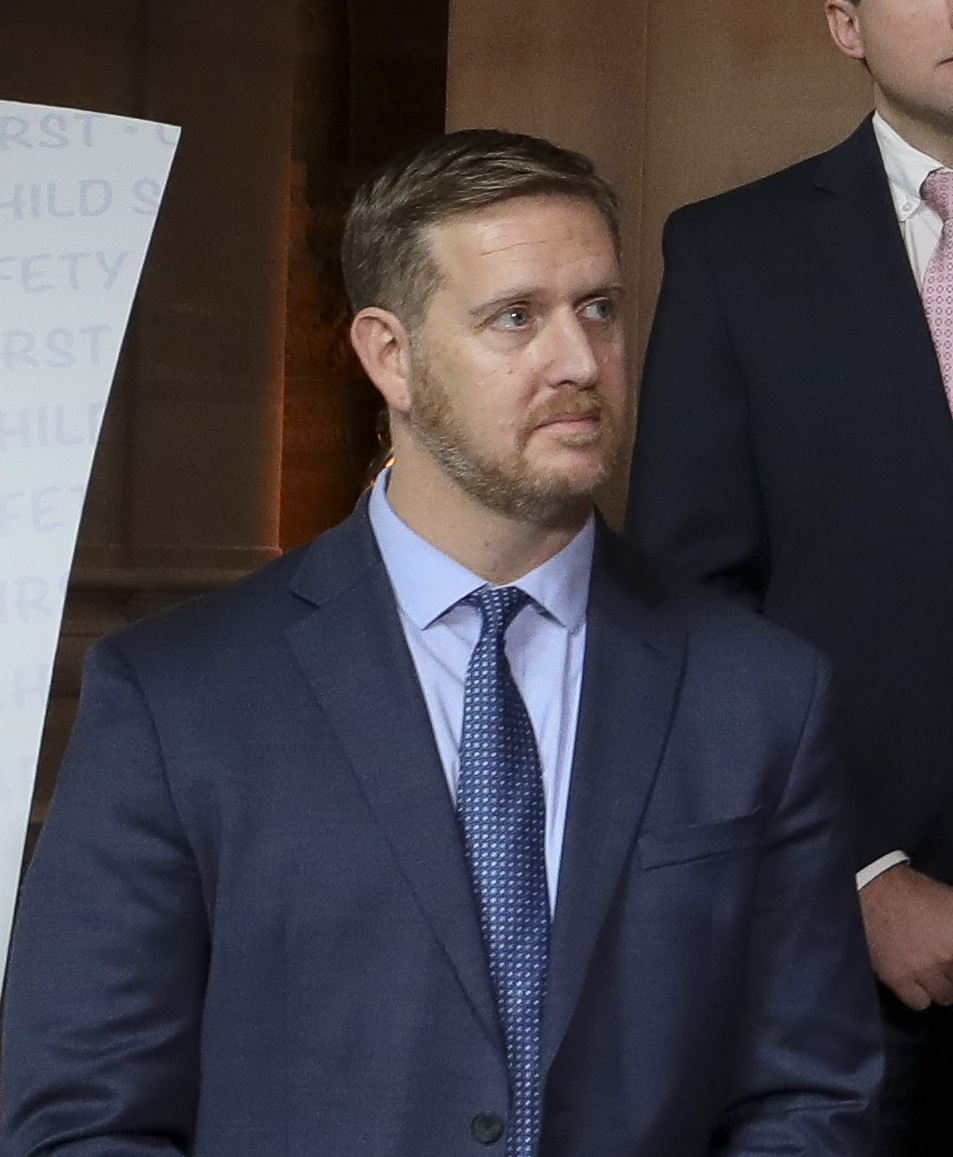

Nominee	Andrew Hevesi	David J. Kemp	Jonathan D. Rinaldi
Party	Democratic	4 Our Immigrants	No Kings
Incumbent Assemblymember
Andrew Hevesi
Democratic

The 28th district is located entirely within Queens in New York City, including parts of the community board districts of Community Board 5, Community Board 6, and Community Board 9. The incumbent is Democrat Andrew Hevesi, who defeated Republican Jonathan D. Rinaldi to win a tenth full term with 58.64% of the vote in 2024.

=== Democratic primary ===
==== Nominee ====
- Andrew Hevesi, incumbent assemblymember

==== Eliminated in primary ====
- Jonathan D. Rinaldi, perennial candidate

==== Endorsements ====
Andrew Hevesi

Labor unions

- New York State United Teachers

Political parties

- New York Working Families Party

==== Fundraising ====
Campaign finance reports as of October 19, 2026
Candidate	Contributions	Loans	Expenditures
Andrew Hevesi (D)	$110,470.00	$0.00	$121,952.26
Jonathan D. Rinaldi (D)	$0.00	$0.00	$0.00
Source: Transparency USA

==== Results ====
2026 New York's 28th State Assembly district Democratic primary election
Party	Candidate	Votes	%
Democratic	Andrew Hevesi (incumbent)	7,096	87.81%
Democratic	Jonathan D. Rinaldi	944	11.68%
Write-in		41	0.51%
Total votes		8,081	100.00%

=== Republican primary ===
==== Disqualified ====
- David J. Kemp

==== Withdrawn ====
- Kevin Keating

==== Fundraising ====
Italics indicate a disqualified or withdrawn candidate.

Campaign finance reports as of October 19, 2026
Candidate	Contributions	Loans	Expenditures
Kevin Keating	$0.00	$0.00	$0.00
David J. Kemp	$0.00	$0.00	$0.00
Source: Transparency USA

=== Third parties and independents ===
==== Declared ====
- David J. Kemp (4 Our Immigrants)
- Jonathan D. Rinaldi (No Kings), perennial candidate

==== Disqualified ====
- Andrew Hevesi (Working Families), incumbent assemblymember
- Jonathan D. Rinaldi (4 Our Immigrants), perennial candidate

=== General election ===
==== Predictions ====
Source	Ranking	As of
State Navigate	Solid D	November 2, 2026

==== Fundraising ====
Campaign finance reports as of October 19, 2026
Candidate	Contributions	Loans	Expenditures
Andrew Hevesi (D)	$110,470.00	$0.00	$121,952.26
David J. Kemp (I)	$0.00	$0.00	$0.00
Jonathan D. Rinaldi (I)	$0.00	$0.00	$0.00
Source: Transparency USA

==== Results ====
2026 New York's 28th State Assembly district election
Party	Candidate	Votes	%	±%
Democratic	Andrew Hevesi (incumbent)			
4 Our Immigrants	David J. Kemp			
No Kings	Jonathan D. Rinaldi			
Write-in				
Total votes				

== District 29 ==
2026 New York's 29th State Assembly district election
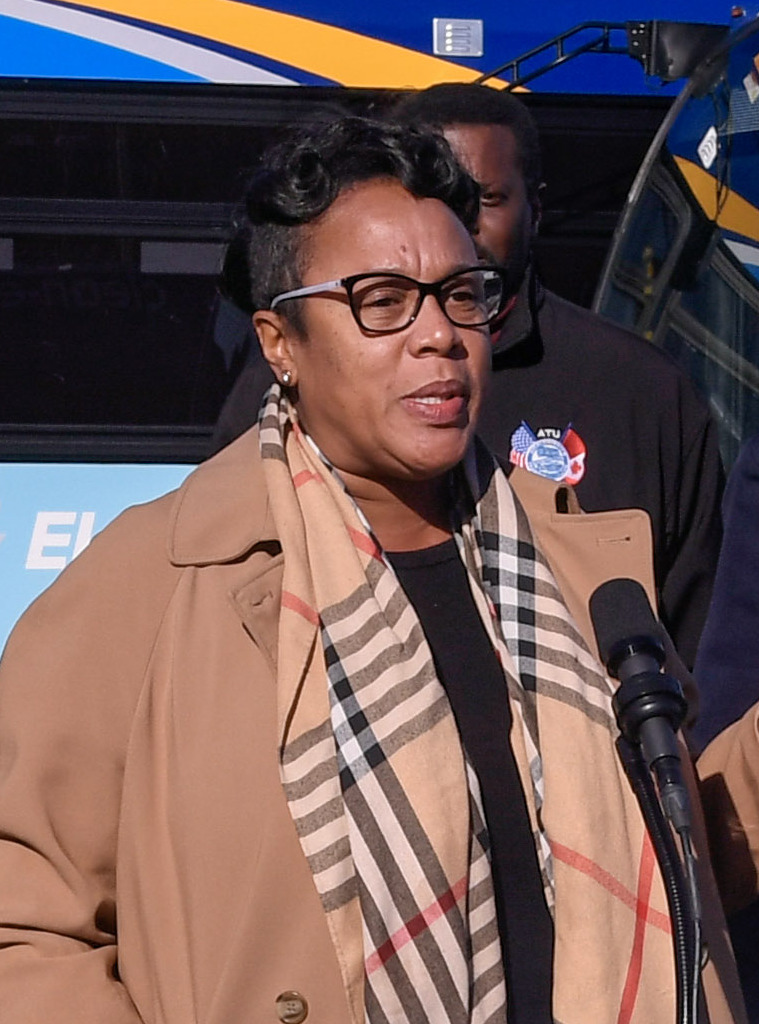
Nominee	Alicia Hyndman
Party	Democratic
Alliance	Working Families
Incumbent Assemblymember
Alicia Hyndman
Democratic

The 29th district is located entirely within Queens in New York City, including parts of the community board districts of Community Board 8, Community Board 12, and Community Board 13. The incumbent is Democrat Alicia Hyndman, who defeated Republican Dwayne Moore to win a fifth full term with 85.77% of the vote in 2024.

=== Democratic primary ===
==== Nominee ====
- Alicia Hyndman, incumbent assemblymember

==== Endorsements ====
Alicia Hyndman

Political parties

- New York Working Families Party

=== Third parties and independents ===
==== Declared ====
- Alicia Hyndman (Working Families), incumbent assemblymember

=== General election ===
==== Predictions ====
Source	Ranking	As of
State Navigate	Uncontested D	November 2, 2026

==== Fundraising ====
Campaign finance reports as of October 19, 2026
Candidate	Contributions	Loans	Expenditures
Alicia Hyndman (D)	$406,758.00	$0.00	$284,964.00
Source: Transparency USA

==== Results ====
2026 New York's 29th State Assembly district election
Party	Candidate	Votes	%	±%
Democratic	Alicia Hyndman			
Working Families	Alicia Hyndman			
Total	Alicia Hyndman (incumbent)			
Write-in				
Total votes				

== District 30 ==
2026 New York's 30th State Assembly district election
Nominee	Patrick Martinez	Brandon P. Castro
Party	Democratic	Republican
Alliance		Conservative; Arts & Culture; Reform
Incumbent Assemblymember
Steven Raga
Democratic

The 30th district is located entirely within Queens in New York City, including parts of the community board districts of Community Board 1, Community Board 2, Community Board 3, Community Board 4, and Community Board 5. The incumbent is Democrat Steven Raga, who defeated Republican Brandon P. Castro to win a second term with 60.36% of the vote in 2024.

On February 17, 2026, Raga announced that he would run for the New York State Senate in the 12th district to succeed retiring eight-term Democratic incumbent Michael Gianaris, after Gianaris announced he would not run for a ninth term. Gianaris subsequently resigned from the State Senate on August 7.

=== Democratic primary ===
==== Nominee ====
- Patrick Martinez, district leader, member of Queens Community Board 2, and nephew of Joe Crowley

==== Eliminated in primary ====
- Somnath C. Ghimire, community leader
- Shamsul Haque, NYPD detective

==== Declined ====
- Steven Raga, incumbent assemblymember (running for New York State Senate)

==== Endorsements ====
Shamsul Haque

U.S. senators

- Bernie Sanders, Vermont (2007–present) (Independent)
Patrick Martinez

Labor unions

- New York State United Teachers

Organizations

- Stonewall Democratic Club of New York City

==== Fundraising ====
Campaign finance reports as of October 19, 2026
Candidate	Contributions	Loans	Expenditures
Patrick Martinez (D)	$352,538.00	$0.00	$332,409.33
Shamsul Haque (D)	$369,328.87	$0.00	$321,519.35
Somnath C. Ghimire (D)	$169,158.55	$0.00	$163,868.05
Source: Transparency USA

==== Results ====
2026 New York's 30th State Assembly district Democratic primary election
Party	Candidate	Votes	%
Democratic	Patrick Martinez	2,784	44.16%
Democratic	Shamsul Haque	2,777	44.04%
Democratic	Somnath C. Ghimire	718	11.39%
Write-in		26	0.41%
Total votes		6,305	100.00%

=== Republican primary ===
==== Nominee ====
- Brandon P. Castro, nominee for this district in 2024

=== Third parties and independents ===
==== Declared ====
- Brandon P. Castro (Conservative/Arts & Culture/Reform), Republican nominee for this district in 2024

=== General election ===
==== Predictions ====
Source	Ranking	As of
State Navigate	Solid D	November 2, 2026

==== Fundraising ====
Campaign finance reports as of October 19, 2026
Candidate	Contributions	Loans	Expenditures
Patrick Martinez (D)	$352,538.00	$0.00	$332,409.33
Brandon P. Castro (R)	$54,797.00	$0.00	$6,292.75
Source: Transparency USA

==== Results ====
2026 New York's 30th State Assembly district election
Party	Candidate	Votes	%	±%
Democratic	Patrick Martinez			
Republican	Brandon P. Castro			
Conservative	Brandon P. Castro			
Arts & Culture	Brandon P. Castro			
Reform	Brandon P. Castro			
Total	Brandon P. Castro			
Write-in				
Total votes				

== District 31 ==
2026 New York's 31st State Assembly district election
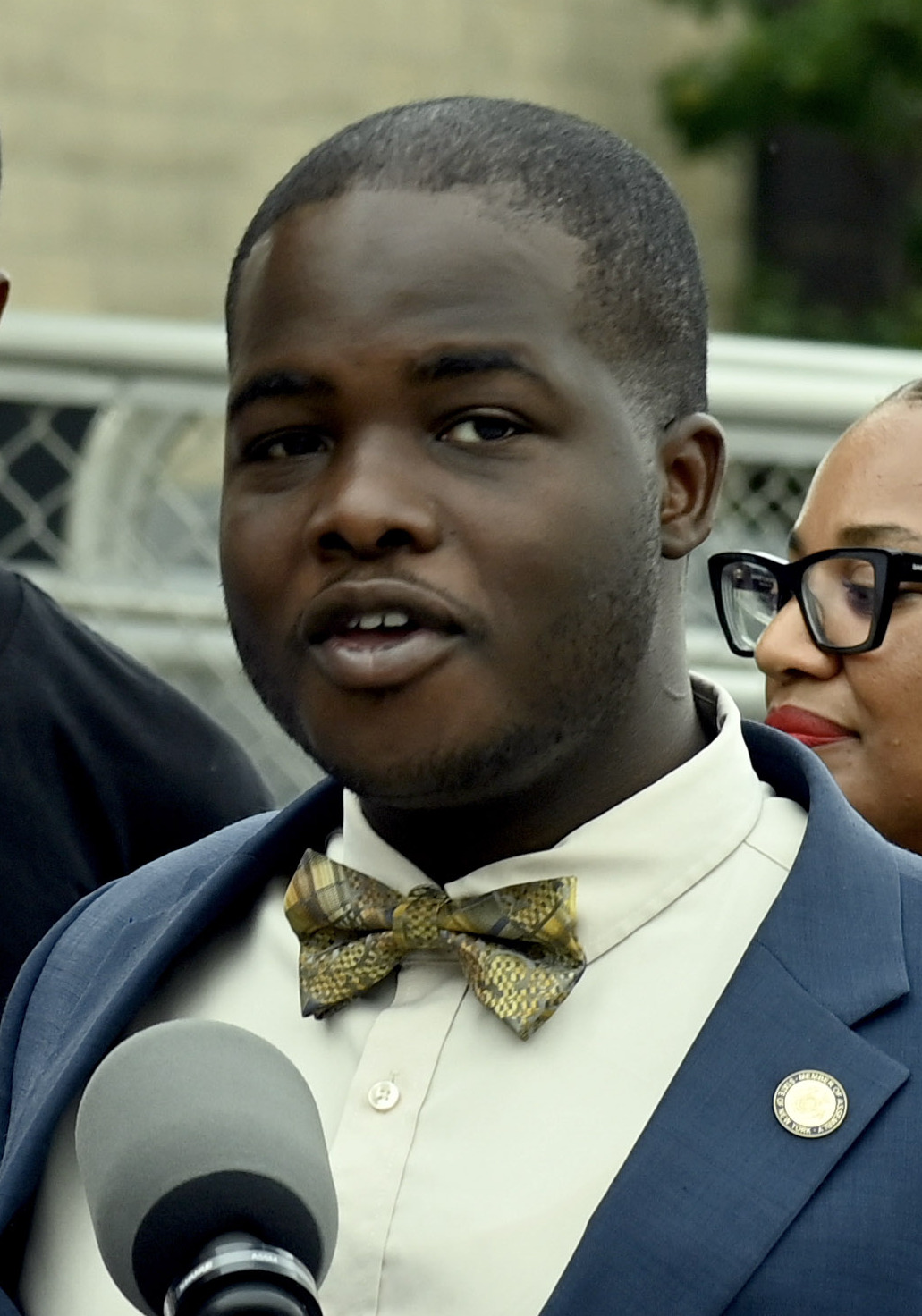
Nominee	Khaleel Anderson
Party	Democratic
Alliance	Working Families
Incumbent Assemblymember
Khaleel Anderson
Democratic

The 31st district is located entirely within Queens in New York City, including parts of the community board districts of Community Board 10, Community Board 12, Community Board 13, and Community Board 14. The incumbent is Democrat Khaleel Anderson, who ran unopposed to win a third term with 99.39% of the vote in 2024.

=== Democratic primary ===
==== Nominee ====
- Khaleel Anderson, incumbent assemblymember

==== Endorsements ====
Khaleel Anderson

Political parties

- New York Working Families Party

=== Third parties and independents ===
==== Declared ====
- Khaleel Anderson (Working Families), incumbent assemblymember

=== General election ===
==== Predictions ====
Source	Ranking	As of
State Navigate	Uncontested D	November 2, 2026

==== Fundraising ====
Campaign finance reports as of October 19, 2026
Candidate	Contributions	Loans	Expenditures
Khaleel Anderson (D)	$55,070.08	$0.00	$79,633.36
Source: Transparency USA

==== Results ====
2026 New York's 31st State Assembly district election
Party	Candidate	Votes	%	±%
Democratic	Khaleel Anderson			
Working Families	Khaleel Anderson			
Total	Khaleel Anderson (incumbent)			
Write-in				
Total votes				

== District 32 ==
2026 New York's 32nd State Assembly district election
Nominee	Nathaniel Hezekiah III	Paul Nichols
Party	Democratic	The Answer
Incumbent Assemblymember
Vivian E. Cook
Democratic

The 32nd district is located entirely within Queens in New York City, including parts of the community board districts of Community Board 8, Community Board 10, and Community Board 12. The incumbent is Democrat Vivian E. Cook, who ran unopposed to win an eighteenth term with 99.44% of the vote in 2024.

On February 2, 2026, Cook announced she would not run for re-election to a nineteenth term.

=== Democratic primary ===
==== Nominee ====
- Nathaniel Hezekiah III, deputy chief of staff for U.S. representative Gregory Meeks

==== Eliminated in primary ====
- Queen Johnson, teacher
- Latoya L. LeGrand, constituent services manager for state senator James Sanders Jr., community liaison for state senator Leroy Comrie, and candidate for New York City's 28th City Council district in 2025
- Mohammed J. Molla, project manager at the New York City Department of Design and Construction
- Tunisia Morrison, former chief of staff for state assemblymember Alicia Hyndman

==== Withdrawn or disqualified ====
- Latoya R. Benjamin, former chief of staff for the New York City Districting Commission, director of the DuBois Bunche Center for Public Policy, and candidate for New York City's 31st City Council district in the 2021 special election
- Paul Nichols, lawyer and legislative staffer

==== Declined ====
- Vivian E. Cook, incumbent assemblymember

==== Endorsements ====
Nathaniel Hezekiah

U.S. representatives

- Gregory Meeks, NY-05 (1998–present)

State legislators

- David Weprin, state assemblymember from the 24th district (2010–present)
- Sam Berger, state assemblymember from the 27th district (2023–present)
- Alicia Hyndman, state assemblymember from the 29th district (2016–present)
- Larinda Hooks, state assemblymember from the 35th district (2025–present)

Local officials

- James F. Gennaro, New York City councilmember from the 24th district (2002–2013, 2021–present)
- Ty Hankerson, New York City councilmember from the 28th district (2026–present)

Labor unions

- New York State United Teachers

Organizations

- Queens County Democratic Party
Latoya L. LeGrand

State legislators

- James Sanders Jr., state senator from the 10th district (2013–present)
- Khaleel Anderson, state assemblymember from the 31st district (2020–present)

Organizations

- Churches United for Fair Housing
- Citizen Action of New York
- New York Progressive Action Network

Political parties

- New York Working Families Party
Tunisia Morrison

Local officials

- Donovan Richards, Queens borough president (2020–present)

Organizations

- Run for Something

==== Fundraising ====
Campaign finance reports as of October 19, 2026
Candidate	Contributions	Loans	Expenditures
Nathaniel Hezekiah III (D)	$267,508.55	$0.00	$245,987.69
Latoya L. LeGrand (D)	$111,423.55	$0.00	$110,893.50
Mohammed J. Molla (D)	$183,575.70	$0.00	$183,096.46
Tunisia Morrison (D)	$174,173.67	$0.00	$180,732.35
Queen Johnson (D)	$191,089.34	$0.00	$164,867.38
Source: Transparency USA

==== Results ====
2026 New York's 32nd State Assembly district Democratic primary election
Party	Candidate	Votes	%
Democratic	Nathaniel Hezekiah III	3,783	51.85%
Democratic	Latoya L. LeGrand	1,425	19.53%
Democratic	Mohammed J. Molla	799	10.95%
Democratic	Tunisia Morrison	733	10.05%
Democratic	Queen Johnson	539	7.39%
Write-in		17	0.23%
Total votes		7,296	100.00%

=== Third parties and independents ===
==== Declared ====
- Paul Nichols (The Answer), lawyer and legislative staffer

==== Withdrawn ====
- Latoya L. LeGrand (Working Families), constituent services manager for state senator James Sanders Jr., community liaison for state senator Leroy Comrie, and candidate for New York City's 28th City Council district in 2025

=== General election ===
==== Predictions ====
Source	Ranking	As of
State Navigate	Solid D	November 2, 2026

==== Fundraising ====
Italics indicate a withdrawn candidate.

Campaign finance reports as of October 19, 2026
Candidate	Contributions	Loans	Expenditures
Nathaniel Hezekiah III (D)	$267,508.55	$0.00	$245,987.69
Paul Nichols (I)	$121,548.00	$0.00	$73,512.87
Latoya L. LeGrand	$111,423.55	$0.00	$110,893.50
Source: Transparency USA

==== Results ====
2026 New York's 32nd State Assembly district election
Party	Candidate	Votes	%	±%
Democratic	Nathaniel Hezekiah III			
The Answer	Paul Nichols			
Write-in				
Total votes				

== District 33 ==
2026 New York's 33rd State Assembly district election
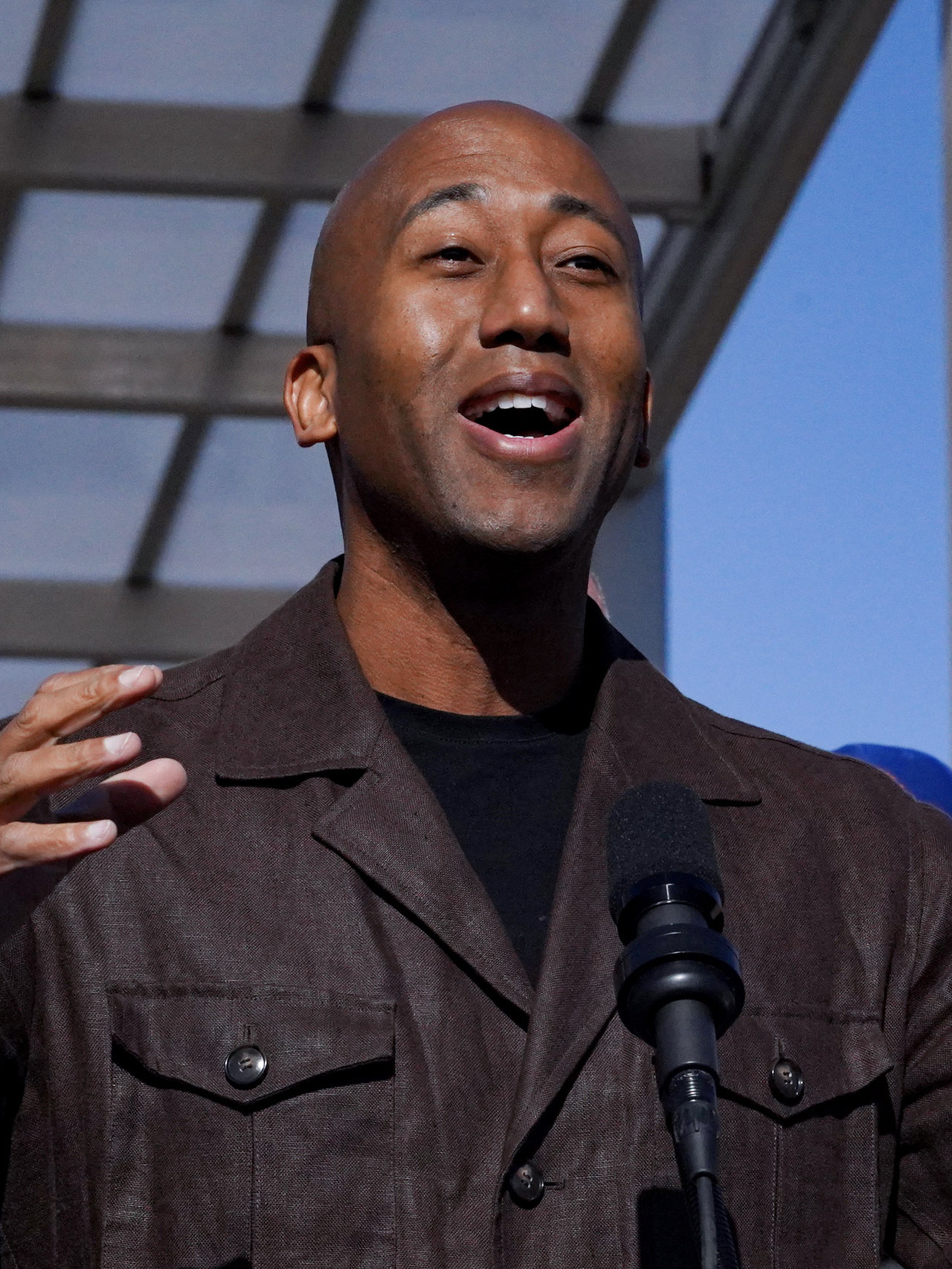

Nominee	Clyde Vanel	Oster G. Bryan
Party	Democratic	Working Families
Incumbent Assemblymember
Clyde Vanel
Democratic

The 33rd district is located entirely within Queens in New York City, including parts of the community board districts of Community Board 12 and Community Board 13. The incumbent is Democrat Clyde Vanel, who ran unopposed to win a fifth term with 98.89% of the vote in 2024.

=== Democratic primary ===
==== Nominee ====
- Clyde Vanel, incumbent assemblymember

==== Eliminated in primary ====
- Oster G. Bryan, candidate for this district in 2020

==== Endorsements ====
Clyde Vanel

Labor unions

- New York State United Teachers
Oster G. Bryan

Political parties

- New York Working Families Party

==== Fundraising ====
Campaign finance reports as of October 19, 2026
Candidate	Contributions	Loans	Expenditures
Clyde Vanel (D)	$57,667.00	$0.00	$32,550.54
Oster G. Bryan (D)	$82,047.00	$0.00	$71,354.39
Source: Transparency USA

==== Results ====
2026 New York's 33rd State Assembly district Democratic primary election
Party	Candidate	Votes	%
Democratic	Clyde Vanel (incumbent)	3,710	70.87%
Democratic	Oster G. Bryan	1,502	28.69%
Write-in		23	0.44%
Total votes		5,235	100.00%

=== Third parties and independents ===
==== Declared ====
- Oster G. Bryan (Working Families), Democratic candidate for this district in 2020

=== General election ===
==== Predictions ====
Source	Ranking	As of
State Navigate	Solid D	November 2, 2026

==== Fundraising ====
Campaign finance reports as of October 19, 2026
Candidate	Contributions	Loans	Expenditures
Clyde Vanel (D)	$57,667.00	$0.00	$32,550.54
Oster G. Bryan (WF)	$82,047.00	$0.00	$71,354.39
Source: Transparency USA

==== Results ====
2026 New York's 33rd State Assembly district election
Party	Candidate	Votes	%	±%
Democratic	Clyde Vanel (incumbent)			
Working Families	Oster G. Bryan			
Write-in				
Total votes				

== District 34 ==
2026 New York's 34th State Assembly district election
Nominee	Brian Romero
Party	Democratic
Alliance	Working Families
Incumbent Assemblymember
Jessica González-Rojas
Democratic

The 34th district is located entirely within Queens in New York City, including parts of the community board districts of Community Board 1, Community Board 3, and Community Board 4. The incumbent is Democrat Jessica González-Rojas, who ran unopposed to win a third term with 98.19% of the vote in 2024.

On July 22, 2025, González-Rojas announced that she would run for the New York State Senate in the 13th district to challenge four-term Democratic incumbent Jessica Ramos.

=== Democratic primary ===
==== Nominee ====
- Brian Romero, chief of staff for state senator Kristen Gonzalez and former chief of staff for state assemblymember Jessica González-Rojas

==== Eliminated in primary ====
- Rosa Sanchez, anti-brothel activist

==== Withdrawn ====
- Aber Kawas, activist and organizer (running for New York State Senate)
- Andreas Migias, member of Queens Community Board 1 (endorsed Romero)

==== Declined ====
- Jessica González-Rojas, incumbent assemblymember (running for New York State Senate)

==== Endorsements ====
Brian Romero

U.S. representatives

- Nydia Velázquez, NY-07 (1993–present)
- Alexandria Ocasio-Cortez, NY-14 (2019–present)

State legislators

- Jessica González-Rojas, state assemblymember from the 34th district (2021–present)
- Catalina Cruz, state assemblymember from the 39th district (2019–present)

Local officials

- Zohran Mamdani, mayor of New York City (2026–present)
- Donovan Richards, Queens borough president (2020–present)
- Julie Won, New York City councilmember from the 26th district (2022–present)

Individuals

- Andreas Migias, member of Queens Community Board 1 and former candidate for this seat

Labor unions

- New York State United Teachers
- United Auto Workers Region 9A

Organizations

- Churches United for Fair Housing
- Citizen Action of New York
- Latino Victory Fund
- Make the Road Action
- Run for Something
- Stonewall Democratic Club of New York City
- Sunrise Movement

Political parties

- New York Working Families Party
Aber Kawas (withdrawn)

Organizations

- New York City Democratic Socialists of America

==== Fundraising ====
Campaign finance reports as of October 19, 2026
Candidate	Contributions	Loans	Expenditures
Brian Romero (D)	$195,754.26	$0.00	$157,572.53
Rosa Sanchez (D)	$10,028.00	$0.00	$25.00
Source: Transparency USA

==== Results ====
2026 New York's 34th State Assembly district Democratic primary election
Party	Candidate	Votes	%
Democratic	Brian Romero	5,064	66.96%
Democratic	Rosa Sanchez	2,436	32.21%
Write-in		63	0.83%
Total votes		7,563	100.00%

=== Third parties and independents ===
==== Declared ====
- Brian Romero (Working Families), chief of staff for state senator Kristen Gonzalez and former chief of staff for state assemblymember Jessica González-Rojas

==== Disqualified ====
- Rosa Sanchez (Affordable & Safe), anti-brothel activist

=== General election ===
==== Predictions ====
Source	Ranking	As of
State Navigate	Uncontested D	November 2, 2026

==== Fundraising ====
Italics indicate a disqualified candidate.

Campaign finance reports as of October 19, 2026
Candidate	Contributions	Loans	Expenditures
Brian Romero (D)	$195,754.26	$0.00	$157,572.53
Rosa Sanchez	$10,028.00	$0.00	$25.00
Source: Transparency USA

==== Results ====
2026 New York's 34th State Assembly district election
Party	Candidate	Votes	%	±%
Democratic	Brian Romero			
Working Families	Brian Romero			
Total	Brian Romero			
Write-in				
Total votes				

== District 35 ==
2026 New York's 35th State Assembly district election
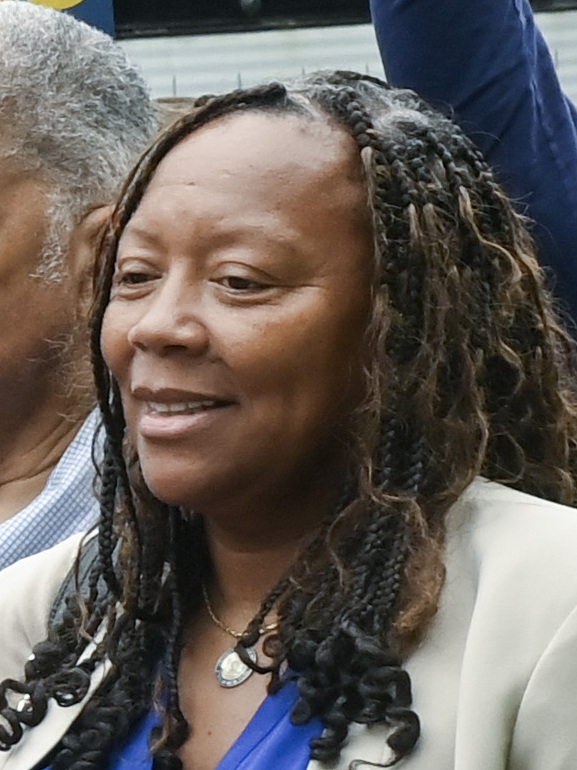
Nominee	Larinda Hooks
Party	Democratic
Alliance	Working Families
Incumbent Assemblymember
Larinda Hooks
Democratic

The 35th district is located entirely within Queens in New York City, including parts of the community board districts of Community Board 1, Community Board 3, Community Board 4, and Community Board 6. The incumbent is Democrat Larinda Hooks, who ran unopposed to succeed sixteen-full-term Democratic incumbent Jeffrion L. Aubry with 98.69% of the vote in 2024.

=== Democratic primary ===
==== Nominee ====
- Larinda Hooks, incumbent assemblymember

==== Endorsements ====
Larinda Hooks

Labor unions

- New York State United Teachers

Political parties

- New York Working Families Party

=== Third parties and independents ===
==== Declared ====
- Larinda Hooks (Working Families), incumbent assemblymember

=== General election ===
==== Predictions ====
Source	Ranking	As of
State Navigate	Uncontested D	November 2, 2026

==== Fundraising ====
Campaign finance reports as of October 19, 2026
Candidate	Contributions	Loans	Expenditures
Larinda Hooks (D)	$43,956.00	$0.00	$36,634.80
Source: Transparency USA

==== Results ====
2026 New York's 35th State Assembly district election
Party	Candidate	Votes	%	±%
Democratic	Larinda Hooks			
Working Families	Larinda Hooks			
Total	Larinda Hooks (incumbent)			
Write-in				
Total votes				

== District 36 ==
2026 New York's 36th State Assembly district election
Nominee	Diana Moreno	Edward Lee
Party	Democratic	Republican
Alliance	Working Families
Incumbent Assemblymember
Diana Moreno
Democratic

The 36th district is located entirely within Queens in New York City, including parts of the community board districts of Community Board 1 and Community Board 2. The incumbent is Democrat Diana Moreno, who defeated Rana Abdelhamid and Mary Jobaida to fill the vacancy of three-full-term Democrat Zohran Mamdani with 74.1% of the vote in February 2026.

In 2024, incumbent Democratic assemblyman Zohran Mamdani ran unopposed to win a third term with 98.45% of the vote. On December 31, 2025, Mamdani resigned from the State Assembly to become the mayor of New York City after winning the election on November 4. On February 3, 2026, Democrat Diana Moreno won the special election with 74.1% of the vote against Rana Abdelhamid and Mary Jobaida to succeed Mamdani. Moreno was sworn in on February 4.

=== Democratic primary ===
==== Nominee ====
- Diana Moreno, incumbent assemblymember

==== Eliminated in primary ====
- Kevin P. Coenen Jr.
- Meherunnisa "Mary" Jobaida, candidate for the 37th district in 2020

==== Endorsements ====
Diana Moreno

Labor unions

- New York State United Teachers

Organizations

- Stonewall Democratic Club of New York City
- Sunrise Movement

Political parties

- New York Working Families Party

==== Fundraising ====
Campaign finance reports as of October 19, 2026
Candidate	Contributions	Loans	Expenditures
Diana Moreno (D)	$335,904.15	$0.00	$313,109.55
Mary Jobaida (D)	$101,336.30	$0.00	$66,375.29
Kevin P. Coenen Jr. (D)	$3,725.00	$1,610.00	$5,634.02
Source: Transparency USA

==== Results ====
2026 New York's 36th State Assembly district Democratic primary election
Party	Candidate	Votes	%
Democratic	Diana Moreno (incumbent)	9,386	78.37%
Democratic	Mary Jobaida	2,045	17.08%
Democratic	Kevin P. Coenen Jr.	490	4.09%
Write-in		55	0.46%
Total votes		11,976	100.00%

=== Republican primary ===
==== Nominee ====
- Edward Lee

=== Third parties and independents ===
==== Declared ====
- Diana Moreno (Working Families), incumbent assemblymember

=== General election ===
==== Predictions ====
Source	Ranking	As of
State Navigate	Solid D	November 2, 2026

==== Fundraising ====
Campaign finance reports as of October 19, 2026
Candidate	Contributions	Loans	Expenditures
Diana Moreno (D)	$335,904.15	$0.00	$313,109.55
Edward Lee (R)	$0.00	$0.00	$0.00
Source: Transparency USA

==== Results ====
2026 New York's 36th State Assembly district election
Party	Candidate	Votes	%	±%
Democratic	Diana Moreno			
Working Families	Diana Moreno			
Total	Diana Moreno (incumbent)			
Republican	Edward Lee			
Write-in				
Total votes				

== District 37 ==
2026 New York's 37th State Assembly district election
Nominee	Samantha Kattan
Party	Democratic
Alliance	Working Families
Incumbent Assemblymember
Claire Valdez
Democratic

The 37th district is located within New York City, including parts of the community board district of Community Board 6 in Manhattan, and parts of the community board districts of Community Board 1, Community Board 2, and Community Board 5 in Queens. The incumbent is Democrat Claire Valdez, who ran unopposed to succeed one-term Democratic incumbent Juan Ardila, who was defeated in the Democratic primary by Valdez, with 98.47% of the vote in 2024.

On January 8, 2026, Valdez announced that she would run for the United States House of Representatives in New York's 7th congressional district to succeed retiring seventeen-term Democratic incumbent Nydia Velázquez.

=== Democratic primary ===
==== Nominee ====
- Samantha Kattan, tenant organizer

==== Eliminated in primary ====
- Melissa Orlando, community leader
- Pia Rahman, former campaign manager for Brian Romero

==== Declined ====
- Claire Valdez, incumbent assemblymember (running for the United States House of Representatives)

==== Endorsements ====
Samantha Kattan

U.S. senators

- Bernie Sanders, Vermont (2007–present) (Independent)

State legislators

- Claire Valdez, state assemblymember from the 37th district (2025–present)

Local officials

- Zohran Mamdani, mayor of New York City (2026–present)

Labor unions

- New York State United Teachers
- United Auto Workers Region 9A

Organizations

- DRUM Beats
- New York City Democratic Socialists of America
- Our Revolution
- Run for Something
- Stonewall Democratic Club of New York City
- Sunrise Movement

Political parties

- New York Working Families Party

==== Fundraising ====
Campaign finance reports as of October 19, 2026
Candidate	Contributions	Loans	Expenditures
Samantha Kattan (D)	$279,394.96	$0.00	$235,783.44
Melissa Orlando (D)	$12,637.23	$8,680.00	$19,909.02
Pia Rahman (D)	$22,715.89	$0.00	$22,715.89
Source: Transparency USA

==== Results ====
2026 New York's 37th State Assembly district Democratic primary election
Party	Candidate	Votes	%
Democratic	Samantha Kattan	8,031	66.87%
Democratic	Melissa Orlando	2,028	16.89%
Democratic	Pia Rahman	1,904	15.85%
Write-in		46	0.38%
Total votes		12,009	100.00%

=== Third parties and independents ===
==== Declared ====
- Samantha Kattan (Working Families), tenant organizer

=== General election ===
==== Predictions ====
Source	Ranking	As of
State Navigate	Uncontested D	November 2, 2026

==== Fundraising ====
Campaign finance reports as of October 19, 2026
Candidate	Contributions	Loans	Expenditures
Samantha Kattan (D)	$279,394.96	$0.00	$235,783.44
Source: Transparency USA

==== Results ====
2026 New York's 37th State Assembly district election
Party	Candidate	Votes	%	±%
Democratic	Samantha Kattan			
Working Families	Samantha Kattan			
Total	Samantha Kattan			
Write-in				
Total votes				

== District 38 ==
2026 New York's 38th State Assembly district election
Nominee	David Orkin	Ruben D. Cruz II
Party	Democratic	Republican
Alliance	Working Families	Queens United
Incumbent Assemblymember
Jenifer Rajkumar
Democratic

The 38th district is located entirely within Queens in New York City, including parts of the community board districts of Community Board 5, Community Board 9, and Community Board 10. The incumbent is Democrat Jenifer Rajkumar, who ran unopposed to win a third term with 97.77% of the vote in 2024.

=== Democratic primary ===
==== Nominee ====
- David Orkin, staff attorney at Make the Road New York

==== Eliminated in primary ====
- Jenifer Rajkumar, incumbent assemblymember

==== Endorsements ====
David Orkin

U.S. senators

- Bernie Sanders, Vermont (2007–present) (Independent)

U.S. representatives

- Alexandria Ocasio-Cortez, NY-14 (2019–present)

State legislators

- Julia Salazar, state senator from the 18th district (2019–present)
- Claire Valdez, state assemblymember from the 37th district (2025–present)

Local officials

- Jennifer Gutiérrez, New York City councilmember from the 34th district (2022–present)

Labor unions

- Office and Professional Employees International Union Local 153
- United Auto Workers Region 9A
- United Federation of Teachers

Organizations

- Citizen Action of New York
- DRUM Beats
- Make the Road Action
- New York City Democratic Socialists of America
- Run for Something
- Stonewall Democratic Club of New York City
- Sunrise Movement

Political parties

- New York Working Families Party
Jenifer Rajkumar

U.S. representatives

- Gregory Meeks, NY-05 (1998–present)

State legislators

- John Liu, state senator from the 16th district (2019–present)
- Nily Rozic, state assemblymember from the 25th district (2013–present)
- Sam Berger, state assemblymember from the 27th district (2023–present)
- Carl Heastie, speaker of the state assembly (2015–present) from the 83rd district (2001–present)

Local officials

- Lynn Schulman, New York City councilmember from the 29th district (2022–present)

Labor unions

- SEIU 32BJ
- Hotel and Gaming Trades Council
- New York State United Teachers

==== Fundraising ====
Campaign finance reports as of October 19, 2026
Candidate	Contributions	Loans	Expenditures
David Orkin (D)	$396,657.16	$0.00	$335,954.37
Jenifer Rajkumar (D)	$300,422.09	$268,000.00	$547,788.06
Source: Transparency USA

==== Results ====
2026 New York's 38th State Assembly district Democratic primary election
Party	Candidate	Votes	%
Democratic	David Orkin	3,861	59.15%
Democratic	Jenifer Rajkumar (incumbent)	2,649	40.58%
Write-in		18	0.28%
Total votes		6,528	100.00%

=== Republican primary ===
==== Nominee ====
- Ruben D. Cruz II, nominee for New York's 24th State Assembly district in 2024

=== Third parties and independents ===
==== Declared ====
- David Orkin (Working Families), staff attorney at Make the Road New York
- Ruben D. Cruz II (Queens United), Republican nominee for New York's 24th State Assembly district in 2024

=== General election ===
==== Predictions ====
Source	Ranking	As of
State Navigate	Solid D	November 2, 2026

==== Fundraising ====
Campaign finance reports as of October 19, 2026
Candidate	Contributions	Loans	Expenditures
David Orkin (D)	$396,657.16	$0.00	$335,954.37
Ruben D. Cruz II (R)	$0.00	$0.00	$0.00
Source: Transparency USA

==== Results ====
2026 New York's 38th State Assembly district election
Party	Candidate	Votes	%	±%
Democratic	David Orkin			
Working Families	David Orkin			
Total	David Orkin			
Republican	Ruben D. Cruz II			
Queens United	Ruben D. Cruz II			
Total	Ruben D. Cruz II			
Write-in				
Total votes				

== District 39 ==
2026 New York's 39th State Assembly district election
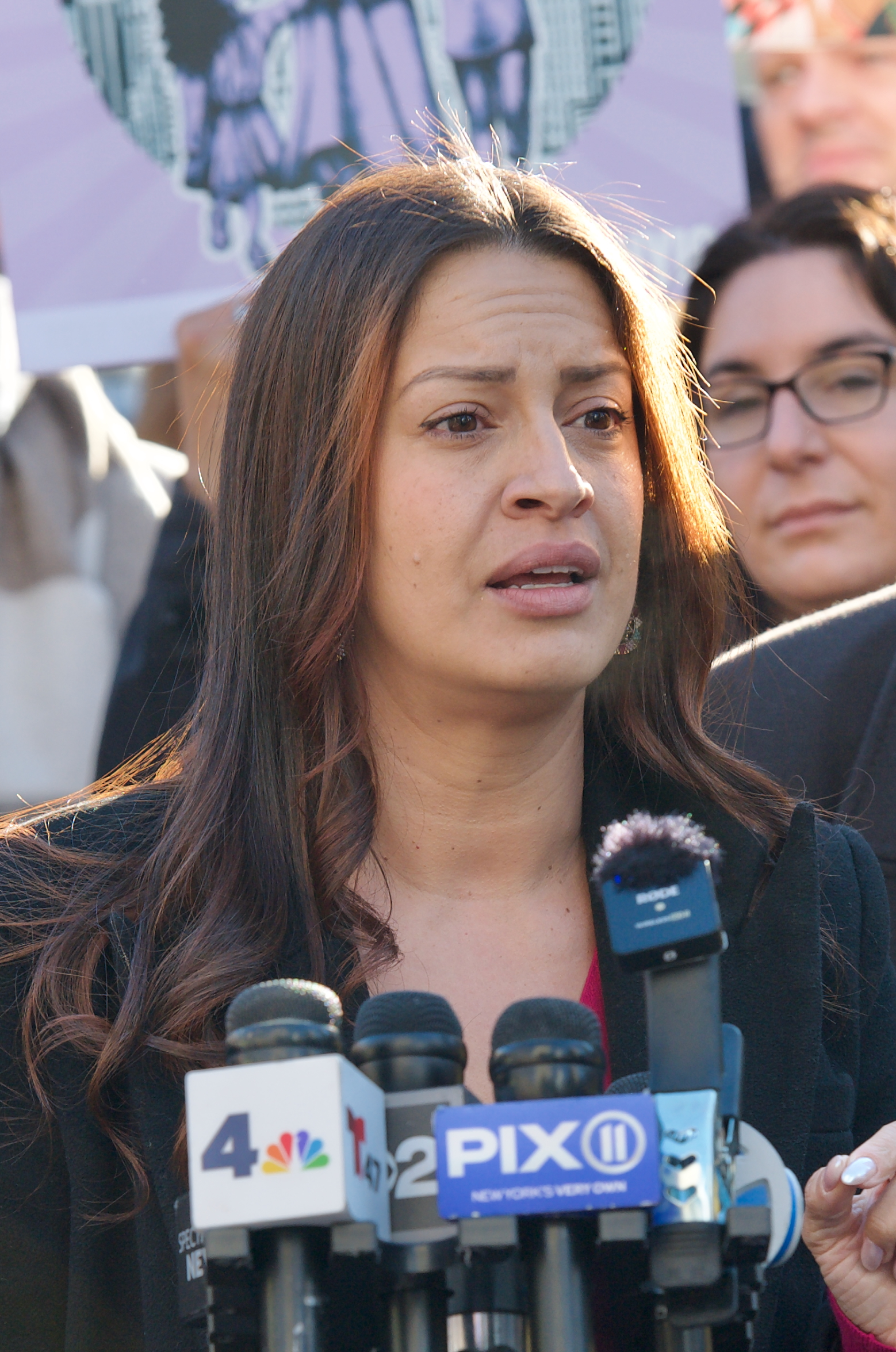

Nominee	Catalina Cruz	Ramses S. Frias
Party	Democratic	Republican
Alliance	Working Families	4 Our Immigrants
Incumbent Assemblymember
Catalina Cruz
Democratic

The 39th district is located entirely within Queens in New York City, including parts of the community board districts of Community Board 3, Community Board 4, Community Board 5, and Community Board 6. The incumbent is Democrat Catalina Cruz, who ran unopposed to win a fourth term with 97.42% of the vote in 2024.

=== Democratic primary ===
==== Nominee ====
- Catalina Cruz, incumbent assemblymember

==== Eliminated in primary ====
- Yonel E. Letellier Sosa, former State Assembly staffer and candidate for this district in 2018

==== Endorsements ====
Catalina Cruz

Labor unions

- New York State United Teachers

Organizations

- Stonewall Democratic Club of New York City

Political parties

- New York Working Families Party

==== Fundraising ====
Campaign finance reports as of October 19, 2026
Candidate	Contributions	Loans	Expenditures
Catalina Cruz (D)	$409,807.25	$0.00	$367,770.02
Yonel E. Letellier Sosa (D)	$11,055.00	$0.00	$100.00
Source: Transparency USA

==== Results ====
2026 New York's 39th State Assembly district Democratic primary election
Party	Candidate	Votes	%
Democratic	Catalina Cruz (incumbent)	5,449	90.95%
Democratic	Yonel E. Letellier Sosa	483	8.06%
Write-in		59	0.98%
Total votes		5,991	100.00%

=== Republican primary ===
==== Nominee ====
- Ramses S. Frias, community activist

=== Third parties and independents ===
==== Declared ====
- Catalina Cruz (Working Families), incumbent assemblymember
- Ramses S. Frias (4 Our Immigrants), community activist

==== Disqualified ====
- Ramses S. Frias (Conservative), community activist
- Yonel E. Letellier Sosa (Affordable & Safe), former State Assembly staffer

=== General election ===
==== Predictions ====
Source	Ranking	As of
State Navigate	Solid D	November 2, 2026

==== Fundraising ====
Italics indicate a disqualified candidate.

Campaign finance reports as of October 19, 2026
Candidate	Contributions	Loans	Expenditures
Catalina Cruz (D)	$409,807.25	$0.00	$367,770.02
Ramses S. Frias (R)	$0.00	$0.00	$0.00
Yonel E. Letellier Sosa	$11,055.00	$0.00	$100.00
Source: Transparency USA

==== Results ====
2026 New York's 39th State Assembly district election
Party	Candidate	Votes	%	±%
Democratic	Catalina Cruz			
Working Families	Catalina Cruz			
Total	Catalina Cruz (incumbent)			
Republican	Ramses S. Frias			
4 Our Immigrants	Ramses S. Frias			
Total	Ramses S. Frias			
Write-in				
Total votes				

== District 40 ==
2026 New York's 40th State Assembly district election
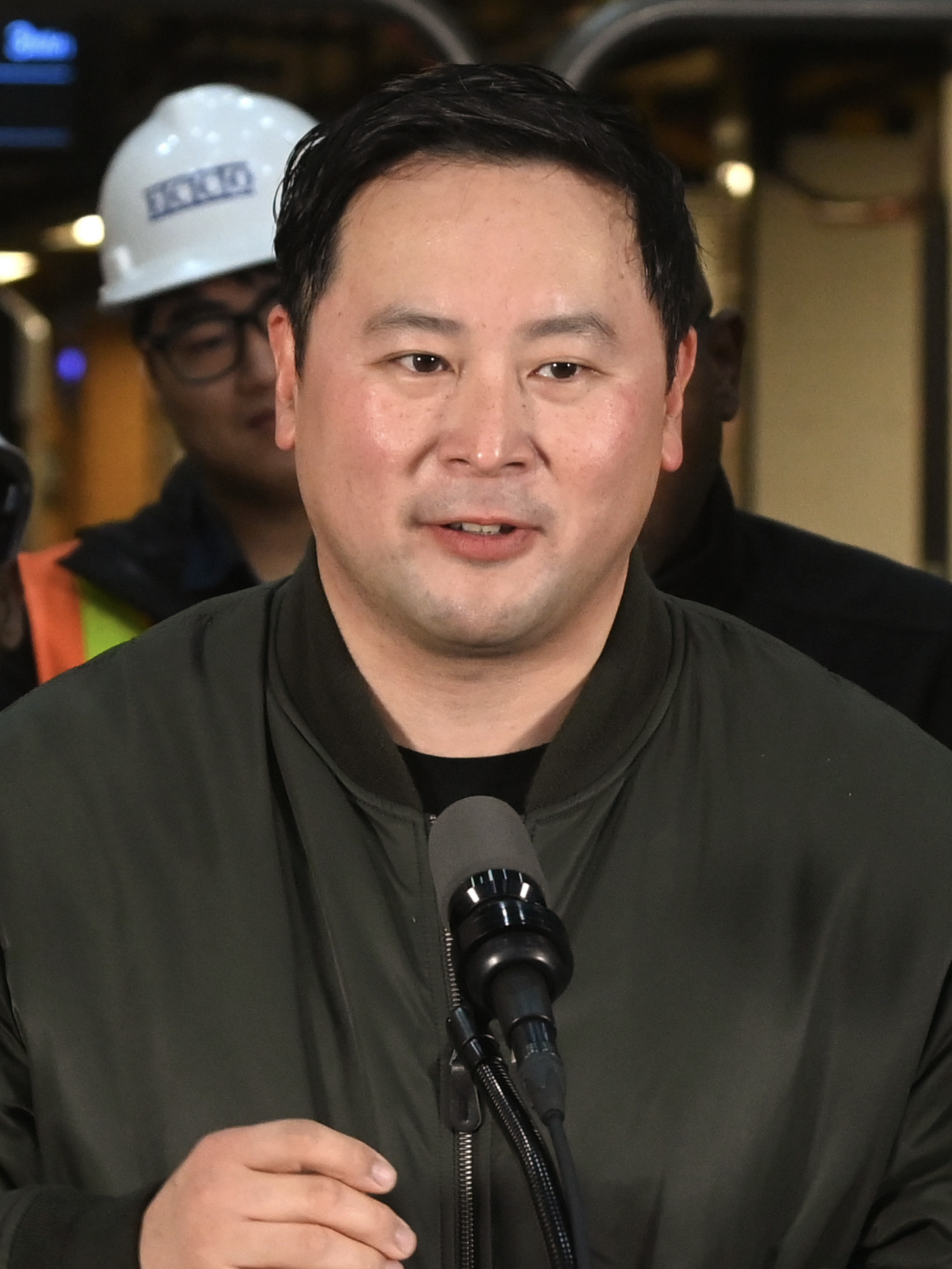
Nominee	Ron Kim
Party	Democratic
Alliance	Working Families
Incumbent Assemblymember
Ron Kim
Democratic

The 40th district is located entirely within Queens in New York City, including parts of the community board district of Community Board 7. The incumbent is Democrat Ron Kim, who defeated Republican Philip S. C. Wang to win a seventh term with 55.33% of the vote in 2024.

=== Democratic primary ===
==== Nominee ====
- Ron Kim, incumbent assemblymember

==== Endorsements ====
Ron Kim

Political parties

- New York Working Families Party

=== Third parties and independents ===
==== Declared ====
- Ron Kim (Working Families), incumbent assemblymember

=== General election ===
==== Predictions ====
Source	Ranking	As of
State Navigate	Uncontested D	November 2, 2026

==== Fundraising ====
Campaign finance reports as of October 19, 2026
Candidate	Contributions	Loans	Expenditures
Ron Kim (D)	$157,838.00	$0.00	$106,587.81
Source: Transparency USA

==== Results ====
2026 New York's 40th State Assembly district election
Party	Candidate	Votes	%	±%
Democratic	Ron Kim			
Working Families	Ron Kim			
Total	Ron Kim (incumbent)			
Write-in				
Total votes				

== District 41 ==
2026 New York's 41st State Assembly district election
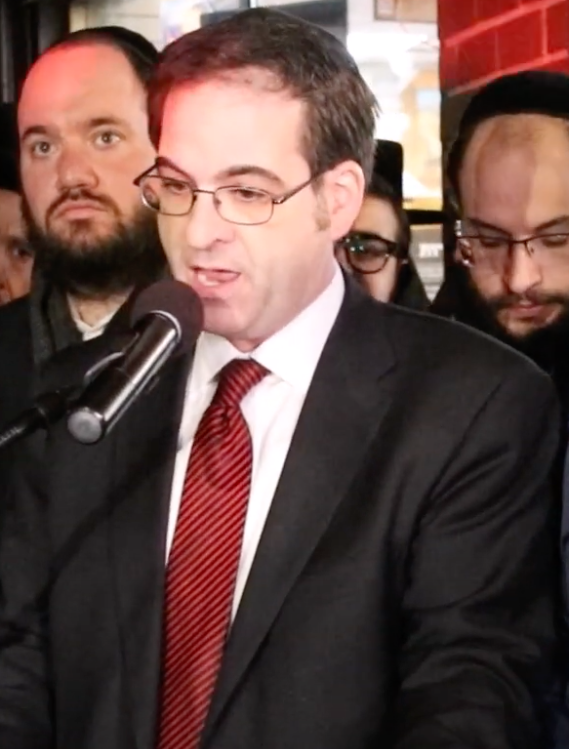
Nominee	Kalman Yeger
Party	Democratic
Alliance	Republican; Conservative
Incumbent Assemblymember
Kalman Yeger
Democratic

The 41st district is located entirely within Brooklyn in New York City, including parts of the community board districts of Community Board 14, Community Board 15, Community Board 17, and Community Board 18. The incumbent is Democrat Kalman Yeger, who ran unopposed to succeed retiring twenty-two-term Democratic incumbent Helene Weinstein with 99.08% of the vote in 2024.

=== Democratic primary ===
==== Nominee ====
- Kalman Yeger, incumbent assemblymember

==== Disqualified ====
- Zahava Durchin

==== Endorsements ====
Zahava Durchin

Organizations

- Run for Something

==== Fundraising ====
Italics indicate a disqualified candidate.

Campaign finance reports as of October 19, 2026
Candidate	Contributions	Loans	Expenditures
Kalman Yeger (D)	$92,386.69	$0.00	$76,821.36
Zahava Durchin	$1,516.00	$0.00	$1,516.00
Source: Transparency USA

=== Republican primary ===
==== Nominee ====
- Kalman Yeger, incumbent assemblymember

==== Disqualified ====
- Zahava Durchin

==== Endorsements ====
Zahava Durchin

Organizations

- Run for Something

==== Fundraising ====
Italics indicate a disqualified candidate.

Campaign finance reports as of October 19, 2026
Candidate	Contributions	Loans	Expenditures
Kalman Yeger (R)	$92,386.69	$0.00	$76,821.36
Zahava Durchin	$1,516.00	$0.00	$1,516.00
Source: Transparency USA

=== Third parties and independents ===
==== Declared ====
- Kalman Yeger (Conservative), incumbent assemblymember

=== General election ===
==== Predictions ====
Source	Ranking	As of
State Navigate	Solid D	November 2, 2026

==== Fundraising ====
Campaign finance reports as of October 19, 2026
Candidate	Contributions	Loans	Expenditures
Kalman Yeger (D)	$92,386.69	$0.00	$76,821.36
Source: Transparency USA

==== Results ====
2026 New York's 41st State Assembly district election
Party	Candidate	Votes	%	±%
Democratic	Kalman Yeger			
Republican	Kalman Yeger			
Conservative	Kalman Yeger			
Total	Kalman Yeger (incumbent)			
Write-in				
Total votes				

== District 42 ==
2026 New York's 42nd State Assembly district election
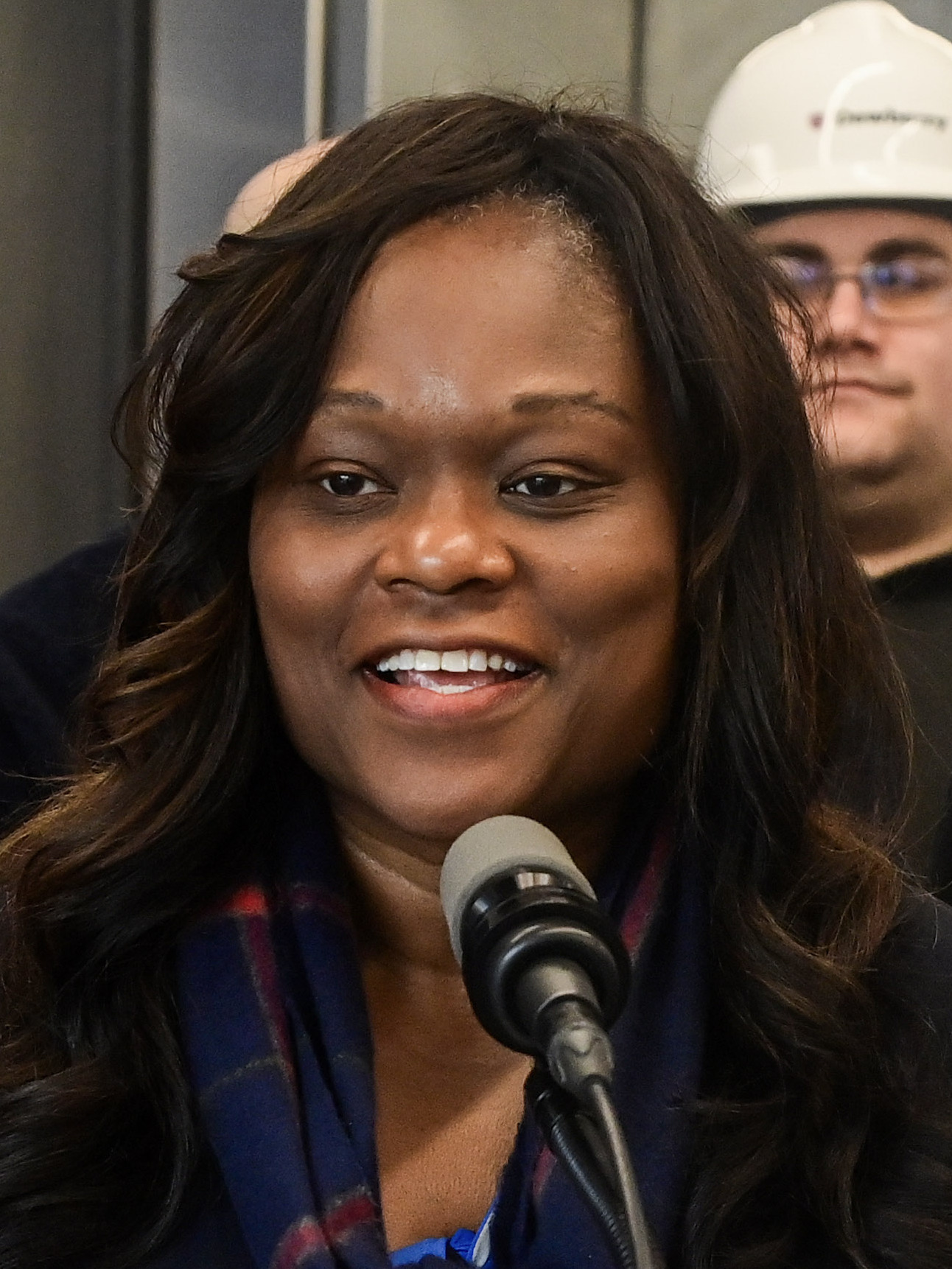

Nominee	Rodneyse Bichotte Hermelyn	Herman G. Hall
Party	Democratic	Republican
Incumbent Assemblymember
Rodneyse Bichotte Hermelyn
Democratic

The 42nd district is located entirely within Brooklyn in New York City, including parts of the community board districts of Community Board 12, Community Board 14, Community Board 17, and Community Board 18. The incumbent is Democrat Rodneyse Bichotte Hermelyn, who ran unopposed to win a sixth term with 98.65% of the vote in 2024.

=== Democratic primary ===
==== Nominee ====
- Rodneyse Bichotte Hermelyn, incumbent assemblymember

=== Republican primary ===
==== Nominee ====
- Herman G. Hall, Conservative candidate for New York's 21st State Senate district in 2014

=== General election ===
==== Predictions ====
Source	Ranking	As of
State Navigate	Solid D	November 2, 2026

==== Fundraising ====
Campaign finance reports as of October 19, 2026
Candidate	Contributions	Loans	Expenditures
Rodneyse Bichotte Hermelyn (D)	$0.00	$0.00	$0.00
Herman G. Hall (R)	$0.00	$0.00	$0.00
Source: Transparency USA

==== Results ====
2026 New York's 42nd State Assembly district election
Party	Candidate	Votes	%	±%
Democratic	Rodneyse Bichotte Hermelyn (incumbent)			
Republican	Herman G. Hall			
Write-in				
Total votes				

== District 43 ==
2026 New York's 43rd State Assembly district election
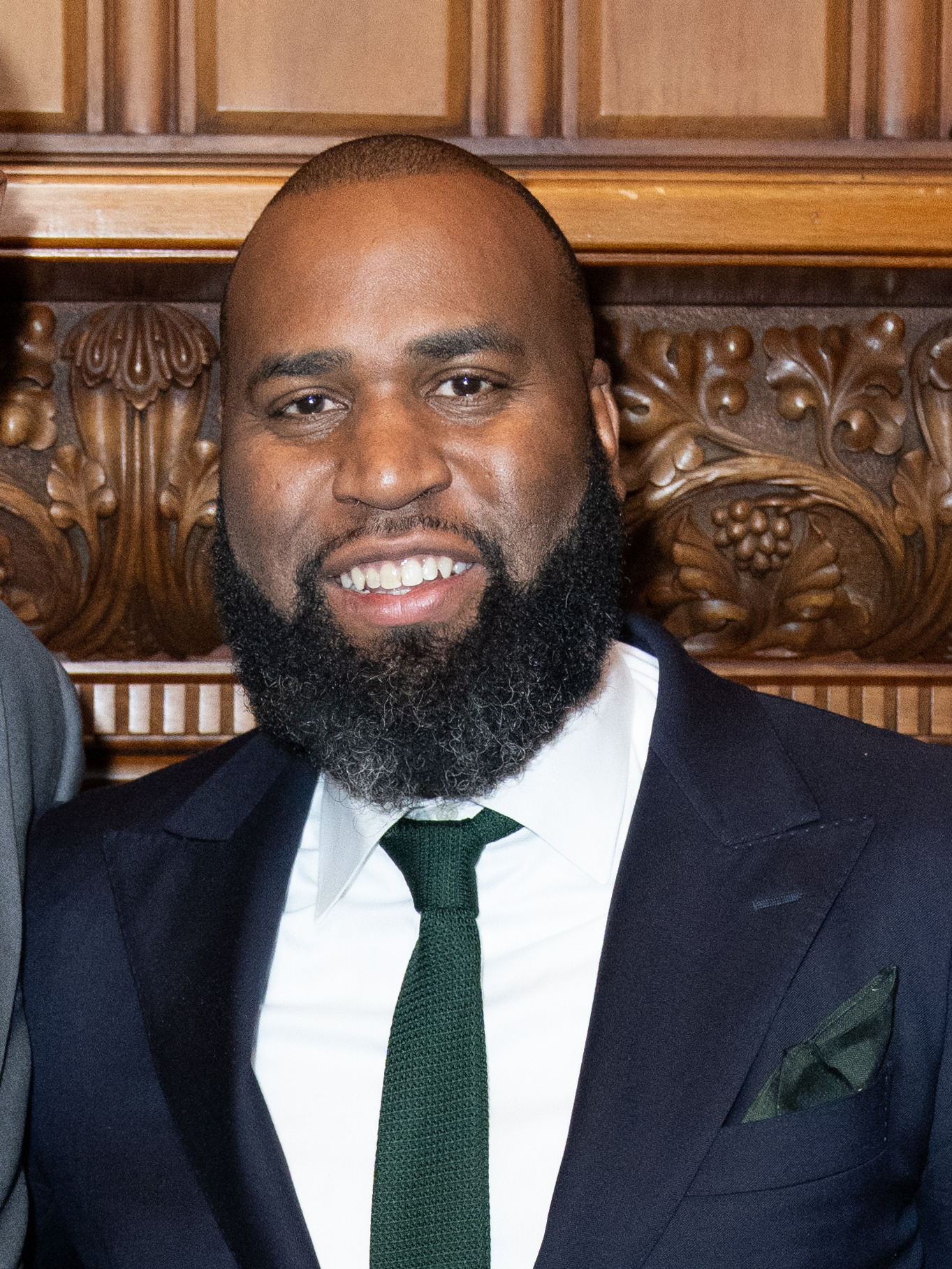

Nominee	Brian A. Cunningham	Anna Shpilkovskaya
Party	Democratic	Republican
Alliance	Working Families
Incumbent Assemblymember
Brian A. Cunningham
Democratic

The 43rd district is located entirely within Brooklyn in New York City, including parts of the community board districts of Community Board 8, Community Board 9, Community Board 14, and Community Board 17. The incumbent is Democrat Brian A. Cunningham, who ran unopposed to win a second full term with 99.44% of the vote in 2024.

=== Democratic primary ===
==== Nominee ====
- Brian A. Cunningham, incumbent assemblymember

==== Eliminated in primary ====
- Ahron Gluck, community organizer

==== Endorsements ====
Brian A. Cunningham

Individuals

- Yaacov Behrman, activist and rabbi
- Devorah Halberstam, gun control activist
- Shea Hecht, rabbi

Labor unions

- New York State United Teachers

Organizations

- Stonewall Democratic Club of New York City

Political parties

- New York Working Families Party

==== Fundraising ====
Campaign finance reports as of October 19, 2026
Candidate	Contributions	Loans	Expenditures
Brian A. Cunningham (D)	$310,473.44	$0.00	$318,540.42
Ahron Gluck (D)	$4,367.00	$0.00	$4,004.19
Source: Transparency USA

==== Results ====
2026 New York's 43rd State Assembly district Democratic primary election
Party	Candidate	Votes	%
Democratic	Brian A. Cunningham (incumbent)	10,180	80.84%
Democratic	Ahron Gluck	2,325	18.46%
Write-in		88	0.70%
Total votes		12,593	100.00%

=== Republican primary ===
==== Nominee ====
- Anna Shpilkovskaya, board member of the Community First Republican Club

=== Third parties and independents ===
==== Declared ====
- Brian A. Cunningham (Working Families), incumbent assemblymember

==== Disqualified ====
- Anna Shpilkovskaya (Community First), board member of the Community First Republican Club

=== General election ===
==== Predictions ====
Source	Ranking	As of
State Navigate	Solid D	November 2, 2026

==== Fundraising ====
Campaign finance reports as of October 19, 2026
Candidate	Contributions	Loans	Expenditures
Brian A. Cunningham (D)	$310,473.44	$0.00	$318,540.42
Anna Shpilkovskaya (R)	$2,223.40	$0.00	$2,020.15
Source: Transparency USA

==== Results ====
2026 New York's 43rd State Assembly district election
Party	Candidate	Votes	%	±%
Democratic	Brian A. Cunningham			
Working Families	Brian A. Cunningham			
Total	Brian A. Cunningham (incumbent)			
Republican	Anna Shpilkovskaya			
Write-in				
Total votes				

== District 44 ==
2026 New York's 44th State Assembly district election
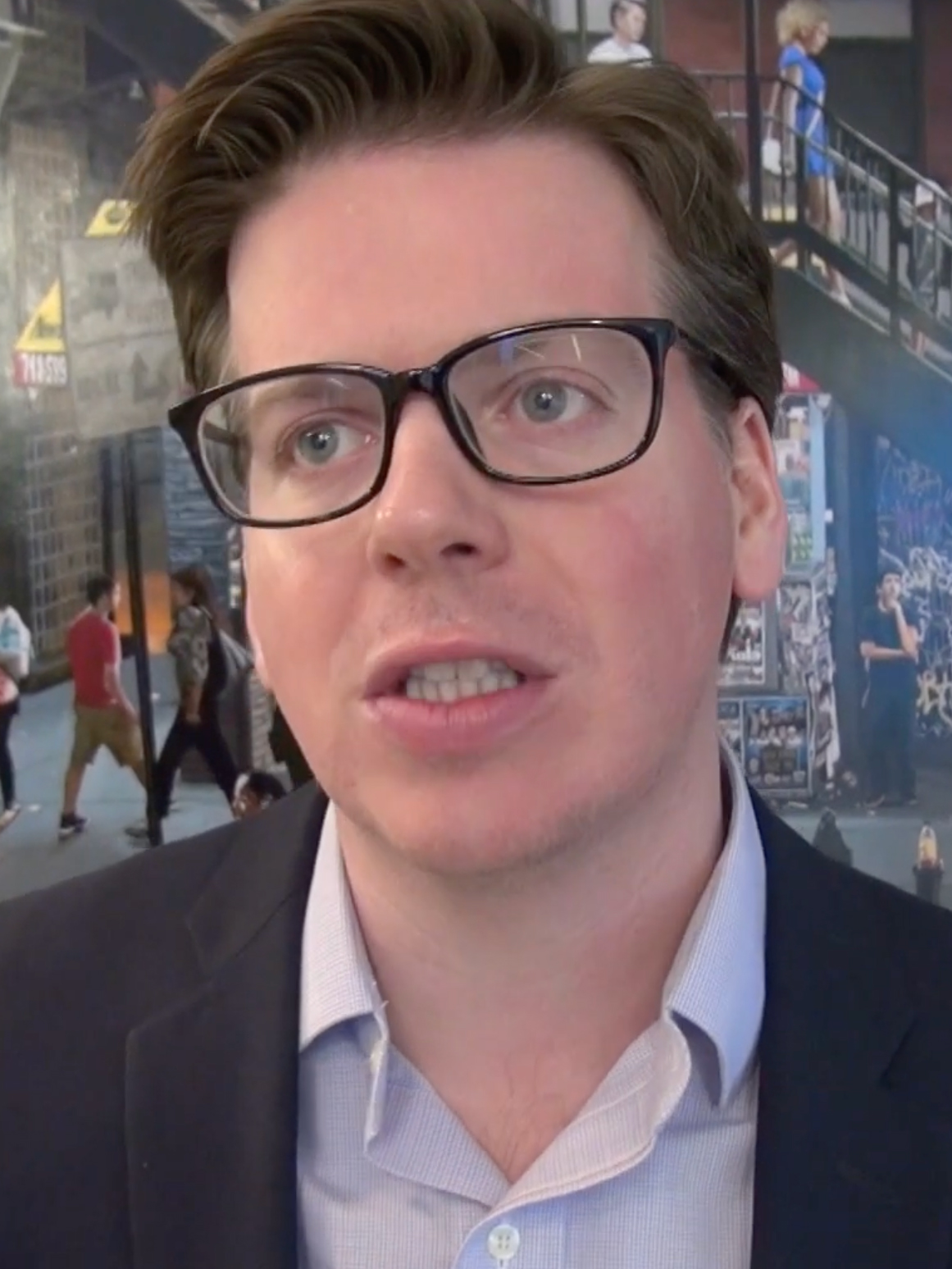

Nominee	Robert Carroll	Glenn P. Nocera
Party	Democratic	Republican
Alliance	Working Families	Conservative
Incumbent Assemblymember
Robert Carroll
Democratic

The 44th district is located entirely within Brooklyn in New York City, including parts of the community board districts of Community Board 2, Community Board 6, Community Board 7, Community Board 8, Community Board 12, and Community Board 14. The incumbent is Democrat Robert Carroll, who defeated Republican John L. Bennett to win a fifth term with 84.9% of the vote in 2024.

=== Democratic primary ===
==== Nominee ====
- Robert Carroll, incumbent assemblymember

==== Disqualified ====
- Ishtiaq Ahmed, community organizer

==== Endorsements ====
Robert Carroll

Labor unions

- United Auto Workers Region 9A

Organizations

- Stonewall Democratic Club of New York City

Political parties

- New York Working Families Party

==== Fundraising ====
Italics indicate a disqualified candidate.

Campaign finance reports as of October 19, 2026
Candidate	Contributions	Loans	Expenditures
Robert Carroll (D)	$131,628.77	$0.00	$130,505.23
Ishtiaq Ahmed	$6,365.00	$0.00	$6,564.67
Source: Transparency USA

=== Republican primary ===
==== Nominee ====
- Glenn P. Nocera, president of the Brooklyn Tea Party

=== Third parties and independents ===
==== Declared ====
- Glenn P. Nocera (Conservative), president of the Brooklyn Tea Party
- Robert Carroll (Working Families), incumbent assemblymember

=== General election ===
==== Predictions ====
Source	Ranking	As of
State Navigate	Solid D	November 2, 2026

==== Fundraising ====
Campaign finance reports as of October 19, 2026
Candidate	Contributions	Loans	Expenditures
Robert Carroll (D)	$131,628.77	$0.00	$130,505.23
Glenn P. Nocera (R)	$0.00	$0.00	$16.40
Source: Transparency USA

==== Results ====
2026 New York's 44th State Assembly district election
Party	Candidate	Votes	%	±%
Democratic	Robert Carroll			
Working Families	Robert Carroll			
Total	Robert Carroll (incumbent)			
Republican	Glenn P. Nocera			
Conservative	Glenn P. Nocera			
Total	Glenn P. Nocera			
Write-in				
Total votes				

== District 45 ==
2026 New York's 45th State Assembly district election
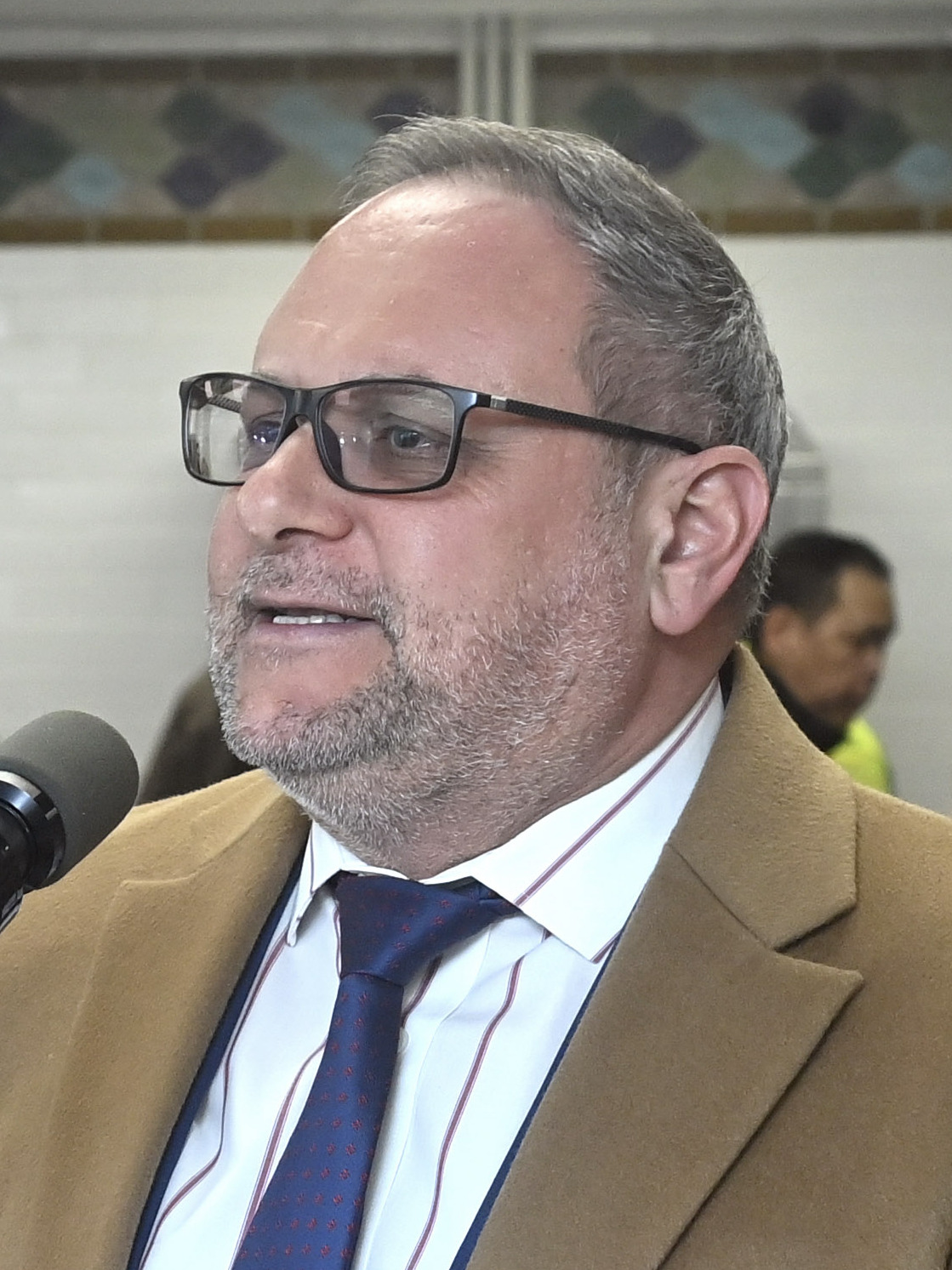

Nominee	Michael Novakhov	Joey Cohen-Saban
Party	Republican	Democratic
Alliance	Conservative	FGT AntiSemitism
Incumbent Assemblymember
Michael Novakhov
Republican

The 45th district is located entirely within Brooklyn in New York City, including parts of the community board districts of Community Board 11, Community Board 12, Community Board 13, Community Board 14, and Community Board 15. The incumbent is Republican Michael Novakhov, who defeated Democrat Joey Cohen-Saban to win a second term with 50.15% of the vote in 2024.

=== Republican primary ===
==== Nominee ====
- Michael Novakhov, incumbent assemblymember

=== Democratic primary ===
==== Nominee ====
- Joey Cohen-Saban, nominee for this district in 2024

=== Third parties and independents ===
==== Declared ====
- Michael Novakhov (Conservative), incumbent assemblymember
- Joey Cohen-Saban (FGT AntiSemitism), Democratic nominee for this district in 2024

==== Disqualified ====
- Rene Monique Mitchell (Independent)
- Michael Novakhov (Stop Mamdani), incumbent assemblymember

=== General election ===
==== Predictions ====
Source	Ranking	As of
State Navigate	Tilt R	November 2, 2026

==== Fundraising ====
Italics indicate a disqualified candidate.

Campaign finance reports as of October 19, 2026
Candidate	Contributions	Loans	Expenditures
Michael Novakhov (R)	$235,999.69	$6,000.00	$44,344.90
Joey Cohen-Saban (D)	$460,709.53	$0.00	$407,651.35
Rene Monique Mitchell	$1,319.00	$0.00	$0.00
Source: Transparency USA

==== Results ====
2026 New York's 45th State Assembly district election
Party	Candidate	Votes	%	±%
Republican	Michael Novakhov			
Conservative	Michael Novakhov			
Total	Michael Novakhov (incumbent)			
Democratic	Joey Cohen-Saban			
FGT AntiSemitism	Joey Cohen-Saban			
Total	Joey Cohen-Saban			
Write-in				
Total votes				

== District 46 ==
2026 New York's 46th State Assembly district election
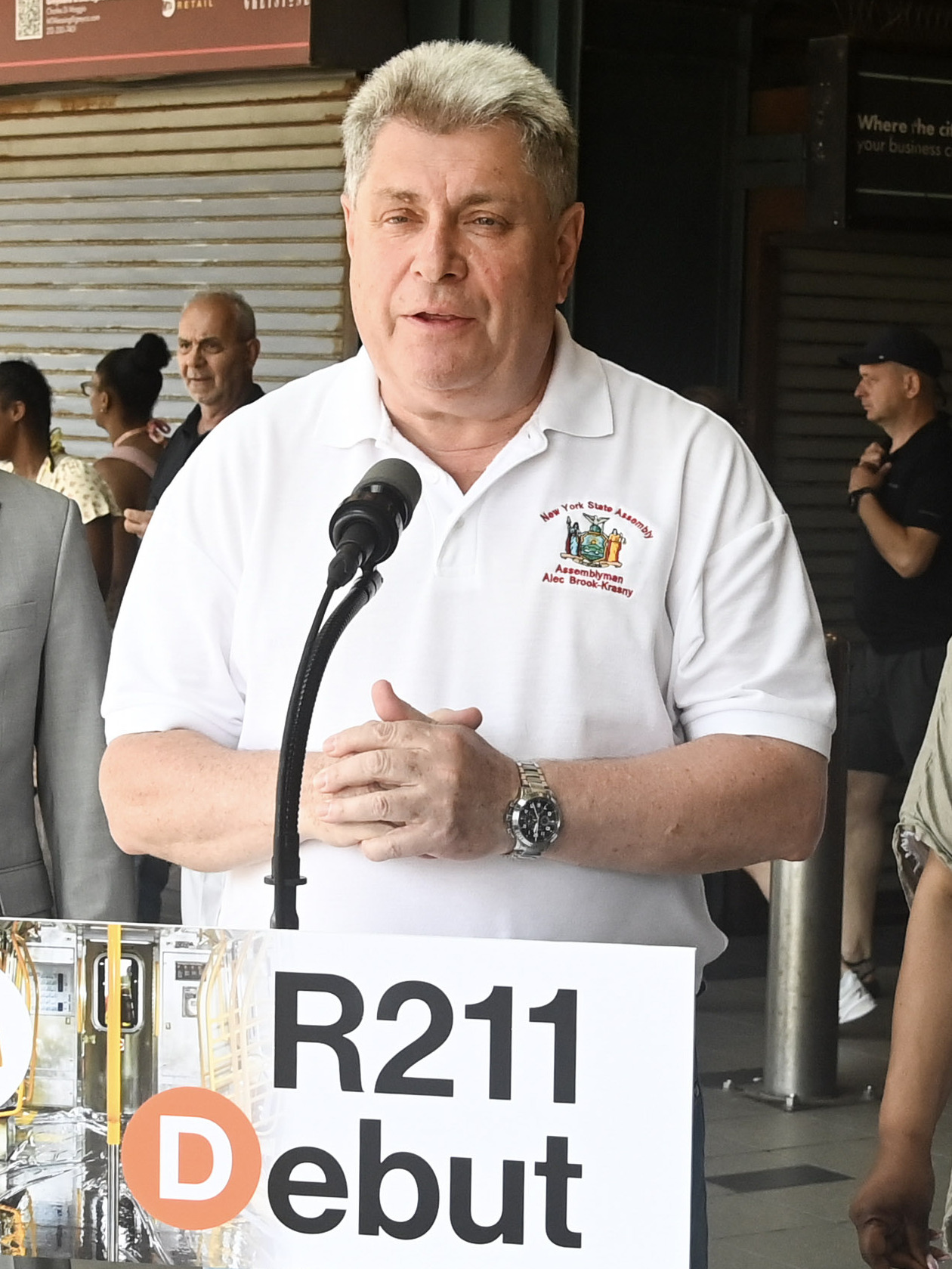

Nominee	Alec Brook-Krasny	Chris McCreight
Party	Republican	Democratic
Alliance	Conservative	Working Families; Affordable & Safe
Incumbent Assemblymember
Alec Brook-Krasny
Republican

The 46th district is located entirely within Brooklyn in New York City, including parts of the community board districts of Community Board 10, Community Board 11, and Community Board 13. The incumbent is Republican Alec Brook-Krasny, who defeated Democrat Chris McCreight to win a second consecutive term (seventh term overall) with 51.63% of the vote in 2024.

=== Republican primary ===
==== Nominee ====
- Alec Brook-Krasny, incumbent assemblymember

=== Democratic primary ===
==== Nominee ====
- Chris McCreight, former chief of staff for New York City councilmember Justin Brannan and nominee for this district in 2024

==== Eliminated in primary ====
- Joseph Santangelo, former Army JAG officer and Manhattan District Attorney prosecutor

==== Disqualified ====
- Marie L. Mirville-Shahzada

==== Endorsements ====
Chris McCreight

Labor unions

- New York State United Teachers

Political parties

- New York Working Families Party
Joseph Santangelo

Organizations

- Stonewall Democratic Club of New York City

==== Fundraising ====
Italics indicate a disqualified candidate.

Campaign finance reports as of October 19, 2026
Candidate	Contributions	Loans	Expenditures
Chris McCreight (D)	$692,665.32	$0.00	$626,076.34
Joseph Santangelo (D)	$77,351.58	$0.00	$74,801.75
Marie L. Mirville-Shahzada	$14,073.66	$0.00	$14,201.46
Source: Transparency USA

==== Results ====
2026 New York's 46th State Assembly district Democratic primary election
Party	Candidate	Votes	%
Democratic	Chris McCreight	3,317	64.10%
Democratic	Joseph Santangelo	1,845	35.65%
Write-in		13	0.25%
Total votes		5,175	100.00%

=== Third parties and independents ===
==== Declared ====
- Alec Brook-Krasny (Conservative), incumbent assemblymember
- Chris McCreight (Working Families/Affordable & Safe), former chief of staff for New York City councilmember Justin Brannan and Democratic nominee for this district in 2024

=== General election ===
==== Predictions ====
Source	Ranking	As of
State Navigate	Tilt R	November 2, 2026

==== Fundraising ====
Campaign finance reports as of October 19, 2026
Candidate	Contributions	Loans	Expenditures
Alec Brook-Krasny (R)	$329,760.59	$0.00	$244,176.59
Chris McCreight (D)	$692,665.32	$0.00	$626,076.34
Source: Transparency USA

==== Results ====
2026 New York's 46th State Assembly district election
Party	Candidate	Votes	%	±%
Republican	Alec Brook-Krasny			
Conservative	Alec Brook-Krasny			
Total	Alec Brook-Krasny (incumbent)			
Democratic	Chris McCreight			
Working Families	Chris McCreight			
Affordable & Safe	Chris McCreight			
Total	Chris McCreight			
Write-in				
Total votes				

== District 47 ==
2026 New York's 47th State Assembly district election
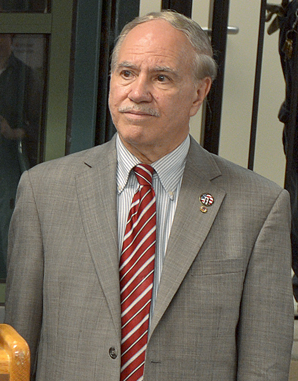

Nominee	William Colton	John J. Ricottone
Party	Democratic	Republican
Alliance		Conservative; Stop Mamdani
Incumbent Assemblymember
William Colton
Democratic

The 47th district is located entirely within Brooklyn in New York City, including parts of the community board districts of Community Board 11 and Community Board 13. The incumbent is Democrat William Colton, who defeated Republican David Sepiashvili to win a fifteenth term with 60.49% of the vote in 2024.

=== Democratic primary ===
==== Nominee ====
- William Colton, incumbent assemblymember

=== Republican primary ===
==== Nominee ====
- John J. Ricottone, vice president of Community Education Council 20

==== Disqualified ====
- Karina Bertaeva, board member of the Community First Republican Club

==== Fundraising ====
Italics indicate a disqualified candidate.

Campaign finance reports as of October 19, 2026
Candidate	Contributions	Loans	Expenditures
John J. Ricottone (R)	$7,027.37	$0.00	$5,195.17
Karina Bertaeva	$545.00	$0.00	$171.95
Source: Transparency USA

=== Third parties and independents ===
==== Declared ====
- John J. Ricottone (Conservative/Stop Mamdani), vice president of Community Education Council 20

==== Disqualified ====
- Karina Bertaeva (Conservative), board member of the Community First Republican Club

==== Fundraising ====
Italics indicate a disqualified candidate.

Campaign finance reports as of October 19, 2026
Candidate	Contributions	Loans	Expenditures
John J. Ricottone (C)	$7,027.37	$0.00	$5,195.17
Karina Bertaeva	$545.00	$0.00	$171.95
Source: Transparency USA

=== General election ===
==== Predictions ====
Source	Ranking	As of
State Navigate	Solid D	November 2, 2026

==== Fundraising ====
Campaign finance reports as of October 19, 2026
Candidate	Contributions	Loans	Expenditures
William Colton (D)	$85,107.83	$0.00	$191,922.32
John J. Ricottone (R)	$7,027.37	$0.00	$5,195.17
Source: Transparency USA

==== Results ====
2026 New York's 47th State Assembly district election
Party	Candidate	Votes	%	±%
Democratic	William Colton (incumbent)			
Republican	John J. Ricottone			
Conservative	John J. Ricottone			
Stop Mamdani	John J. Ricottone			
Total	John J. Ricottone			
Write-in				
Total votes				

== District 48 ==
2026 New York's 48th State Assembly district election
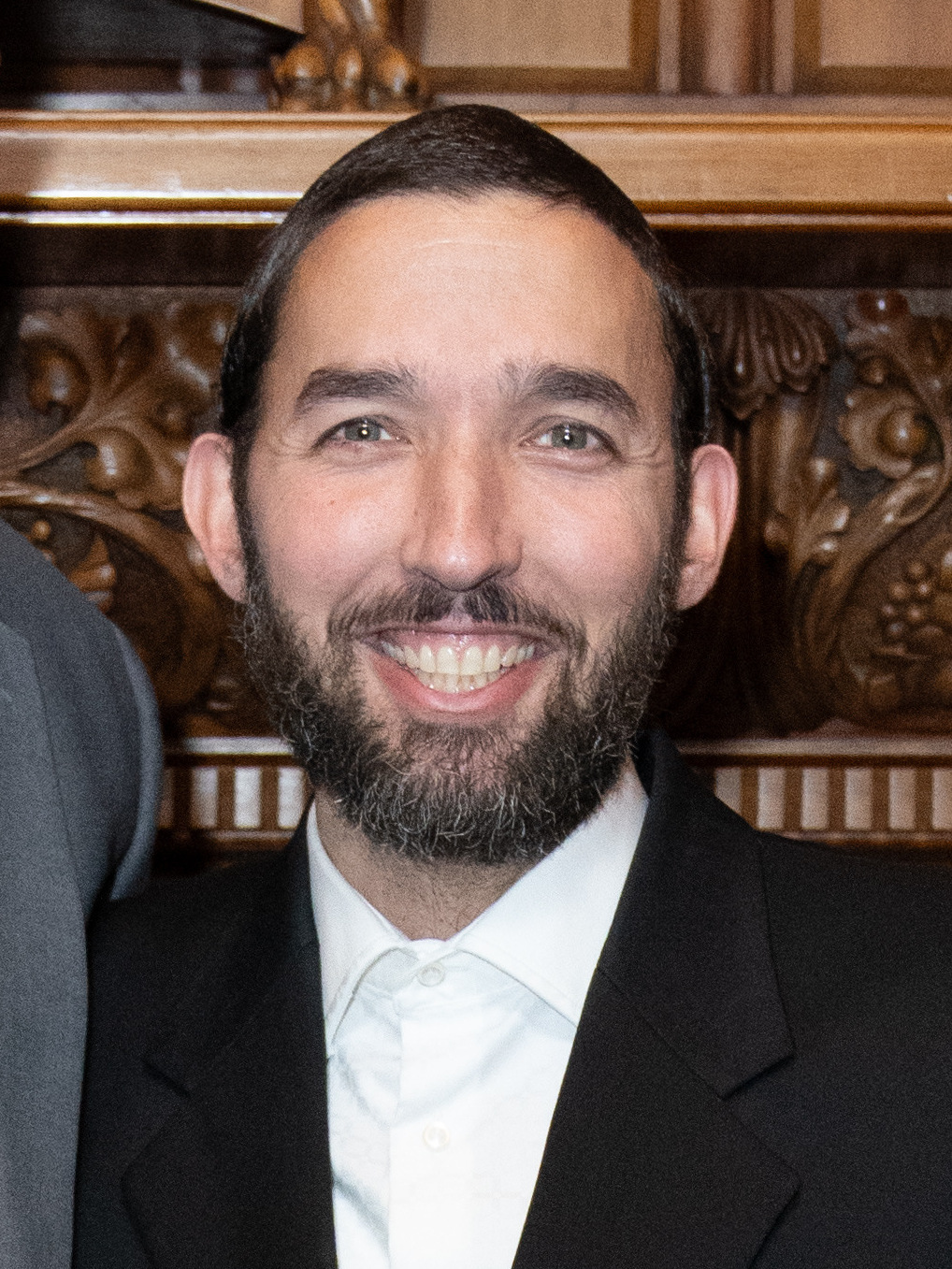
Nominee	Simcha Eichenstein
Party	Democratic
Alliance	Conservative
Incumbent Assemblymember
Simcha Eichenstein
Democratic

The 48th district is located entirely within Brooklyn in New York City, including parts of the community board districts of Community Board 12 and Community Board 14. The incumbent is Democrat Simcha Eichenstein, who ran unopposed to win a fourth term with 98.88% of the vote in 2024.

=== Democratic primary ===
==== Nominee ====
- Simcha Eichenstein, incumbent assemblymember

=== Third parties and independents ===
==== Declared ====
- Simcha Eichenstein (Conservative), incumbent assemblymember

=== General election ===
==== Predictions ====
Source	Ranking	As of
State Navigate	Solid D	November 2, 2026

==== Fundraising ====
Campaign finance reports as of October 19, 2026
Candidate	Contributions	Loans	Expenditures
Simcha Eichenstein (D)	$214,553.81	$0.00	$40,387.12
Source: Transparency USA

==== Results ====
2026 New York's 48th State Assembly district election
Party	Candidate	Votes	%	±%
Democratic	Simcha Eichenstein			
Conservative	Simcha Eichenstein			
Total	Simcha Eichenstein (incumbent)			
Write-in				
Total votes				

== District 49 ==
2026 New York's 49th State Assembly district election
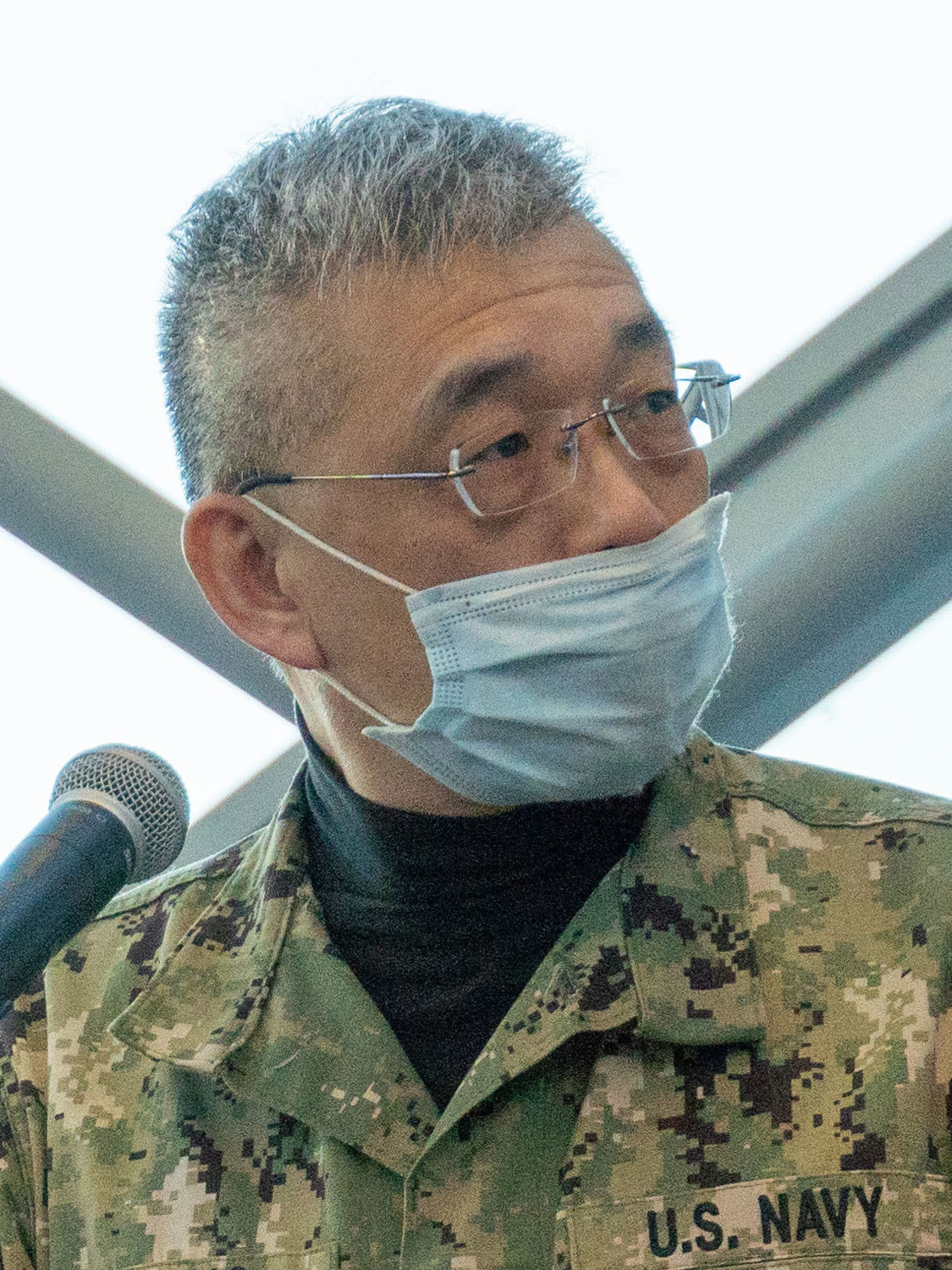

Nominee	Lester Chang	Joyce Xiaoqiong Xie
Party	Republican	Democratic
Alliance	Conservative
Incumbent Assemblymember
Lester Chang
Republican

The 49th district is located entirely within Brooklyn in New York City, including parts of the community board districts of Community Board 7, Community Board 10, Community Board 11, Community Board 12. The incumbent is Republican Lester Chang, who ran unopposed to win a second term with 97.26% of the vote in 2024.

=== Republican primary ===
==== Nominee ====
- Lester Chang, incumbent assemblymember

=== Democratic primary ===
==== Nominee ====
- Joyce Xiaoqiong Xie, district leader

=== Third parties and independents ===
==== Declared ====
- Lester Chang (Conservative), incumbent assemblymember

==== Disqualified ====
- Lester Chang (Stop Mamdani), incumbent assemblymember

=== General election ===
==== Predictions ====
Source	Ranking	As of
State Navigate	Solid R	November 2, 2026

==== Fundraising ====
Campaign finance reports as of October 19, 2026
Candidate	Contributions	Loans	Expenditures
Lester Chang (R)	$337,441.65	$10,000.00	$206,882.15
Joyce Xiaoqiong Xie (D)	$329,058.19	$0.00	$79,089.65
Source: Transparency USA

==== Results ====
2026 New York's 49th State Assembly district election
Party	Candidate	Votes	%	±%
Republican	Lester Chang			
Conservative	Lester Chang			
Total	Lester Chang (incumbent)			
Democratic	Joyce Xiaoqiong Xie			
Write-in				
Total votes				

== District 50 ==
2026 New York's 50th State Assembly district election
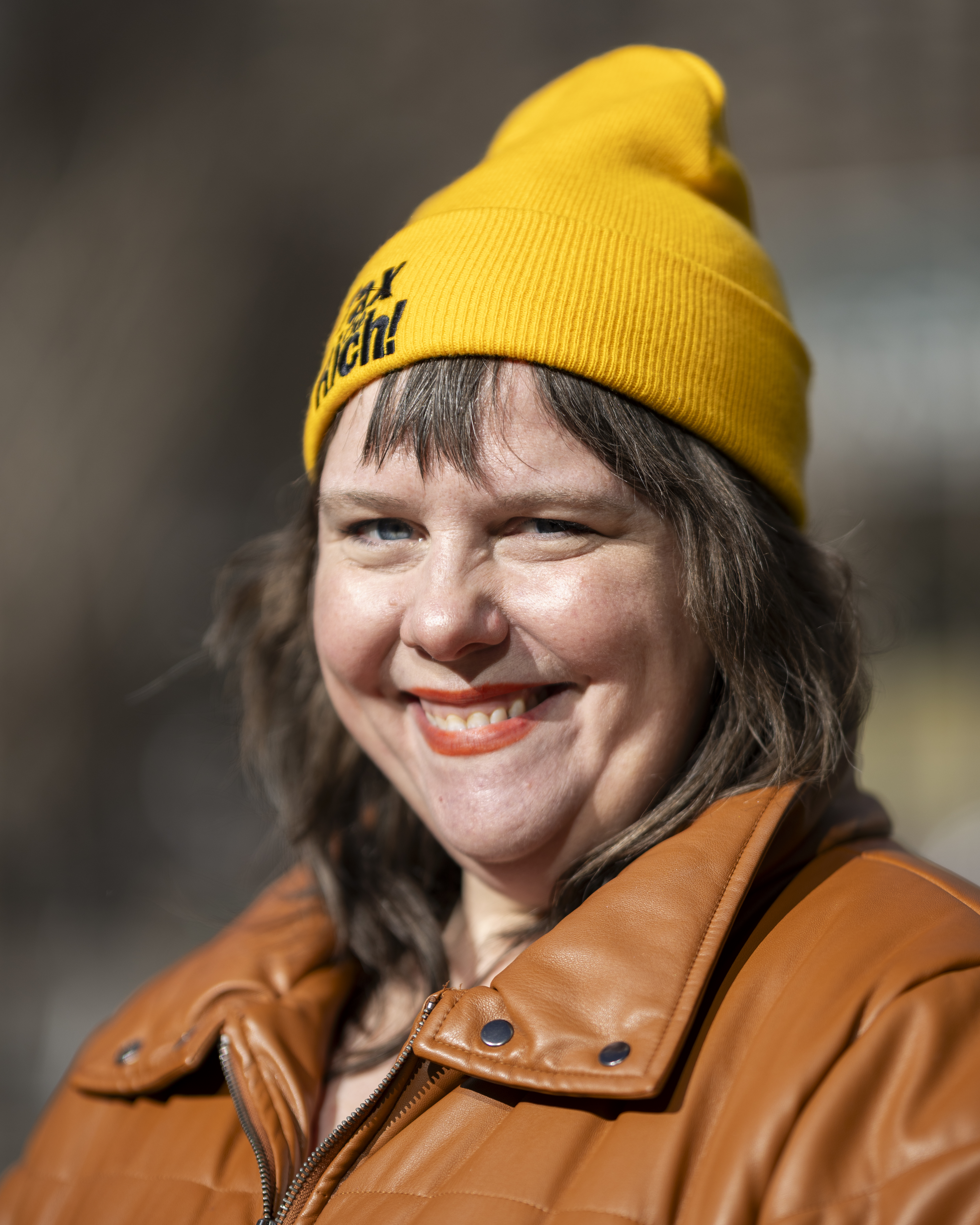
Nominee	Emily Gallagher
Party	Democratic
Incumbent Assemblymember
Emily Gallagher
Democratic

The 50th district is located entirely within Brooklyn in New York City, including parts of the community board district of Community Board 1. The incumbent is Democrat Emily Gallagher, who ran unopposed to win a third term with 97.99% of the vote in 2024.

=== Democratic primary ===
==== Nominee ====
- Emily Gallagher, incumbent assemblymember

==== Eliminated in primary ====
- Andrew Bodiford, attorney

==== Endorsements ====
Emily Gallagher

Labor unions

- New York State United Teachers
- United Auto Workers Region 9A

Organizations

- Sunrise Movement

Political parties

- New York Working Families Party

==== Fundraising ====
Campaign finance reports as of October 19, 2026
Candidate	Contributions	Loans	Expenditures
Emily Gallagher (D)	$142,504.26	$0.00	$164,387.97
Andrew Bodiford (D)	$9,516.15	$0.00	$8,123.57
Source: Transparency USA

==== Results ====
2026 New York's 50th State Assembly district Democratic primary election
Party	Candidate	Votes	%
Democratic	Emily Gallagher (incumbent)	11,680	85.35%
Democratic	Andrew Bodiford	1,720	12.57%
Write-in		285	2.08%
Total votes		13,685	100.00%

=== Third parties and independents ===
==== Disqualified ====
- Emily Gallagher (Working Families), incumbent assemblymember

=== General election ===
==== Predictions ====
Source	Ranking	As of
State Navigate	Solid D	November 2, 2026

==== Fundraising ====
Campaign finance reports as of October 19, 2026
Candidate	Contributions	Loans	Expenditures
Emily Gallagher (D)	$142,504.26	$0.00	$164,387.97
Source: Transparency USA

==== Results ====
2026 New York's 50th State Assembly district election
Party	Candidate	Votes	%	±%
Democratic	Emily Gallagher (incumbent)			
Write-in				
Total votes				

== See also ==
- List of New York State legislatures
