= 2018 New York State Assembly election =

2018 New York Assembly election
- November 6, 2018

All 150 seats in the New York State Assembly 75 seats needed for a majority
- Turnout: 44.47%
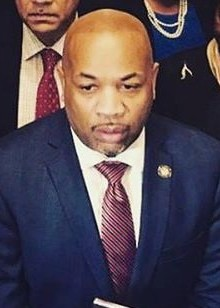

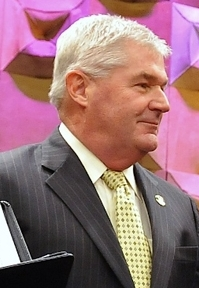

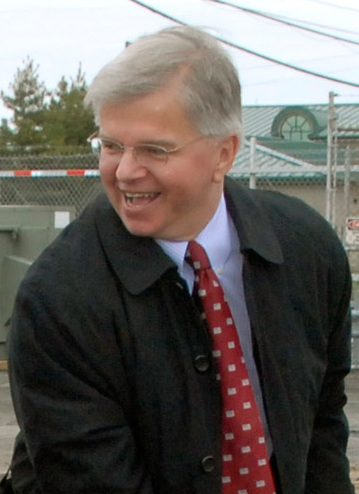
	Majority party	Minority party	Third party
Leader	Carl Heastie	Brian Kolb	Fred Thiele (Note: Thiele caucuses with the Democrats.)
Party	Democratic	Republican	Independence
Leader since	February 5, 2015	April 6, 2009	October 2009
Leader's seat	83rd district	131st district	1st district
Last election	106	43	1
Seats before	107	42	1
Seats won	106	43	1
Seat change	▼1	▲1	Steady
Popular vote	3,503,874	1,598,468	93,835
Percentage	62.01%	28.29%	1.66%
Swing	▲3.89%	▼2.51%	▼1.08%
- Results: Democratic hold Democratic gain Republican hold Republican gain Independence hold
Speaker before election
Carl Heastie
Democratic
Speaker
Carl Heastie
Democratic

Elections to the New York State Assembly were held on November 6, 2018, along with elections for the state senate, governor, and U.S. senator, among others. The Democrats retained their majority with no net change in seats from 2016. Eight seats changed hands, four from Republican to Democrat and four from Democrat to Republican.

== Overview ==
Party	Seats	Votes	Percentage	Swing
Democratic	105	3,503,874	62.01%	▲3.89%
Republican	43	1,598,468	28.29%	▼2.51%
Conservative	0	235,807	4.17%	▼0.45%
Working Families	1	155,810	2.76%	▲0.20%
Independence	1	93,835	1.66%	▼1.08%
Reform	0	28,392	0.50%	▲0.10%
Women's Equality	0	23,419	0.41%	▲0.03%
Green	0	6,211	0.11%	▼0.18%
Libertarian	0	3,958	0.07%	▼0.13%
Tax Revolt	0	235	0.00%	▼0.20%
In Maio We Trust	0	106	0.00%	New

== Predictions ==
Source	Ranking	As of
Governing	Safe D	October 8, 2018

== Assembly districts ==
District	Member	Party	First elected	Status	Results
1	Fred Thiele	Dem	1995+	Incumbent re-elected.	Fred Thiele (D) 60% Patrick O'Connor (R) 40%
2	Anthony Palumbo	Rep	2013+	Incumbent re-elected.	Anthony Palumbo (R) 60% Rona Smith (D) 40%
3	L. Dean Murray	Rep	2014	Incumbent retired to run for state senate. Republican hold.	Joe DeStefano (R) 55% Clyde Parker (D) 46%
4	Steve Englebright	Dem	1992+	Incumbent re-elected.	Steve Englebright (D) 60% Christian Kalinowski (R) 40%
5	Douglas M. Smith	Rep	2018+	Incumbent re-elected.	Douglas M. Smith (R) 59% Tim Hall (D) 41%
6	Philip Ramos	Dem	2002	Incumbent re-elected.	Philip Ramos (D) 100%
7	Andrew Garbarino	Rep	2012	Incumbent re-elected.	Andrew Garbarino (R) 59% Tom Murray (D) 41%
8	Michael J. Fitzpatrick	Rep	2002	Incumbent re-elected.	Michael J. Fitzpatrick (R) 61% Dave Morrisey (D) 31%
9	Christine Pellegrino	Dem	2017+	Incumbent lost re-election. Republican gain.	Mike LiPietri (R) 56% Christine Pellegrino (D) 44%
10	Steve Stern	Dem	2018+	Incumbent re-elected.	Steve Stern (D) 60% Jeremy Williams (R) 41%
11	Kimberly Jean-Pierre	Dem	2014	Incumbent re-elected.	Kimberly Jean-Pierre (D) 64% Kevin Sabella (R) 36%
12	Andrew Raia	Rep	2002	Incumbent re-elected.	Andrew Raia (R) 56% Avrum Rosen (D) 44%
13	Charles D. Lavine	Dem	2004	Incumbent re-elected.	Charles D. Lavine (D) 68% Andrew Monteleone (R) 32%
14	David McDonough	Rep	2002+	Incumbent re-elected.	David McDonough (R) 56% Michael F. Reid (D) 44%
15	Michael Montesano	Rep	2010+	Incumbent re-elected.	Michael Montesano (R) 53% Allen Foley (D) 47%
16	Anthony D'Urso	Dem	2016	Incumbent re-elected.	Anthony D'Urso (D) 62% Byron Divins Jr. (R) 38%
17	John Mikulin	Rep	2018+	Incumbent re-elected.	John Mikulin (R) 56% Kimberly Snow (D) 44%
18	Earlene Hooper	Dem	1988+	Incumbent lost renomination. Democratic hold.	Taylor Darling (D) 90% James Lamarre (R) 10%
19	Ed Ra	Rep	2010	Incumbent re-elected.	Ed Ra (R) 56% William Carr (D) 44%
20	Melissa Miller	Rep	2016	Incumbent re-elected.	Melissa Miller (R) 54% Juan Vides (D) 45% John Vobis Jr. (REF) 1%
21	Brian Curran	Rep	2010	Incumbent lost reelection. Democratic gain.	Judy Griffin (D) 53% Brian Curran (R) 47%
22	Michaelle C. Solages	Dem	2012	Incumbent re-elected.	Michaelle C. Solages (D) 70% Gonald Moncion (R) 30%
23	Stacey Pheffer Amato	Dem	2016	Incumbent re-elected.	Stacey Pheffer Amato (D) 68% Matthew Pecorino (R) 32%
24	David Weprin	Dem	2010+	Incumbent re-elected.	David Weprin (D) 100%
25	Nily Rozic	Dem	2012	Incumbent re-elected.	Nily Rozic (D) 100%
26	Edward Braunstein	Dem	2010	Incumbent re-elected.	Edward Braunstein (D) 65% David Bressler (R) 35%
27	Daniel Rosenthal	Dem	2017+	Incumbent re-elected.	Daniel Rosenthal (D) 100%
28	Andrew Hevesi	Dem	2005+	Incumbent re-elected.	Andrew Hevesi (D) 73% Danniel Maio (R) 27%
29	Alicia Hyndman	Dem	2015+	Incumbent re-elected.	Alicia Hyndman (D) 100%
30	Brian Barnwell	Dem	2016	Incumbent re-elected.	Brian Barnwell (D) 76% Eric Butkiewicz (R) 24%
31	Michele Titus	Dem	2002+	Incumbent re-elected.	Michele Titus (D) 100%
32	Vivian E. Cook	Dem	1990	Incumbent re-elected.	Vivian E. Cook (D) 100%
33	Clyde Vanel	Dem	2016+	Incumbent re-elected.	Clyde Vanel (D) 92% Lalita Etwaroo (R) 8%
34	Michael DenDekker	Dem	2008	Incumbent re-elected.	Michael DenDekker (D) 100%
35	Jeffrion L. Aubry	Dem	1992+	Incumbent re-elected.	Jeffrion L. Aubry (D) 100%
36	Aravella Simotas	Dem	2010	Incumbent re-elected.	Aravella Simotas (D) 100%
37	Catherine Nolan	Dem	1984	Incumbent re-elected.	Catherine Nolan (D) 100%
38	Michael G. Miller	Dem	2009+	Incumbent re-elected.	Michael G. Miller (D) 100%
39	Ari Espinal	Dem	2018+	Incumbent lost renomination. Democratic hold.	Catalina Cruz (D) 88% Ari Espinal (WF) 10% Bobby Kalotee (REF) 2%
40	Ron Kim	Dem	2012	Incumbent re-elected.	Ron Kim (D) 87% John Scandalios (REF) 13%
41	Helene Weinstein	Dem	1980	Incumbent re-elected.	Helene Weinstein (D) 100%
42	Rodneyse Bichotte	Dem	2014	Incumbent re-elected.	Rodneyse Bichotte (D) 91% Matthew Williams (R) 7% Anthony Beckford (G) 2%
43	Diana Richardson	Dem	2015+	Incumbent re-elected.	Diana Richardson (D) 100%
44	Robert Carroll	Dem	2016	Incumbent re-elected.	Robert Carroll (D) 86% Yevgeny Goldberg (R) 14%
45	Steven Cymbrowitz	Dem	2000	Incumbent re-elected.	Steven Cymbrowitz (D) 100%
46	Vacant	Dem		Incumbent resigned on April 2, 2018, due to criminal investigation. Democratic hold.	Mathylde Frontus (D) 54% Stephen Saperstein (R) 43% Ethan Lustig-Elgraby (WF) 2% Patrick Dwyer (G) 1%
47	William Colton	Dem	1996	Incumbent re-elected.	William Colton (D) 70% Florence LaSalle (R) 31%
48	Dov Hikind	Dem	1982	Incumbent retired. Democratic hold.	Simcha Eichenstein (D) (D) 100%
49	Peter J. Abbate Jr.	Dem	1986	Incumbent re-elected.	Peter J. Abbate Jr. (D) 85% Rosemary Mangino (C) 16%
50	Joe Lentol	Dem	1972	Incumbent re-elected.	Joe Lentol (D) 100%
51	Felix Ortiz	Dem	1994	Incumbent re-elected.	Felix Ortiz (D) 100%
52	Jo Anne Simon	Dem	2014	Incumbent re-elected.	Jo Anne Simon (D) 95% Daniel Ramos (C) 3% Gary Popkin (L) 2%
53	Maritza Davila	Dem	2013+	Incumbent re-elected.	Maritza Davila (D) 100%
54	Erik Martin Dilan	Dem	2014	Incumbent re-elected.	Erik Martin Dilan (D) 96% Khorshed Chowdhury (R) 4%
55	Latrice Walker	Dem	2014	Incumbent re-elected.	Latrice Walker (D) 98% Berneda Jackson (R) 2%
56	Tremaine Wright	Dem	2016	Incumbent re-elected.	Tremaine Wright (D) 100%
57	Walter Mosley	Dem	2012	Incumbent re-elected.	Walter Mosley (D) 100%
58	N. Nick Perry	Dem	1992	Incumbent re-elected.	N. Nick Perry (D) 100%
59	Jaime Williams	Dem	2016+	Incumbent re-elected.	Jaime Williams (D) 81% Brandon Washington (R) 19%
60	Charles Barron	Dem	2014	Incumbent re-elected.	Charles Barron (D) 96% Leroy Bates (R) 3% Horrie Johnson (C) 1%
61	Matthew Titone	Dem	2007+	Incumbent retired to run for Richmond County Surrogate Judge. Democratic hold.	Charles Fall (D) 84% Patricia Kane (WF) 10% Daniel Falcone (G) 6%
62	Ronald Castorina	Rep	2016+	Incumbent retired to run for Richmond County Surrogate Judge. Republican hold.	Michael Reilly (R) 90% Glenn Yost (D) 10%
63	Michael Cusick	Dem	2002	Incumbent re-elected.	Michael Cusick (D) 96% John Dennie (G) 4%
64	Nicole Malliotakis	Rep	2010	Incumbent re-elected.	Nicole Malliotakis (R) 61% Adam Baumel (D) 39%
65	Yuh-Line Niou	Dem	2016	Incumbent re-elected.	Yuh-Line Niou (D) 100%
66	Deborah J. Glick	Dem	1990	Incumbent re-elected.	Deborah J. Glick (D) 82% Cynthia Nixon (WF) 18%
67	Linda Rosenthal	Dem	2006+	Incumbent re-elected.	Linda Rosenthal (D) 100%
68	Robert J. Rodriguez	Dem	2010	Incumbent re-elected.	Robert J. Rodriguez (D) 93% Daby Carreras (R) 7%
69	Daniel J. O'Donnell	Dem	2002	Incumbent re-elected.	Daniel J. O'Donnell (D) 93% Corina Cotenescu (R) 7%
70	Inez Dickens	Dem	2016	Incumbent re-elected.	Inez Dickens (D) 100%
71	Al Taylor	Dem	2017+	Incumbent re-elected.	Al Taylor (D) 100%
72	Carmen De La Rosa	Dem	2016	Incumbent re-elected.	Carmen De La Rosa (D) 94% Ronny Goodman (R) 6%
73	Dan Quart	Dem	2011+	Incumbent re-elected.	Dan Quart (D) 76% Jeff Ascherman (R) 24%
74	Harvey Epstein	Dem	2018+	Incumbent re-elected.	Harvey Epstein (D) 87% Bryan Cooper (R) 11% Juan Pagan (REF) 2%
75	Richard N. Gottfried	Dem	1970	Incumbent re-elected.	Richard N. Gottfried (D) 100%
76	Rebecca Seawright	Dem	2014	Incumbent re-elected.	Rebecca Seawright (D) 97% Louis Puliafito (REF) 4%
77	Latoya Joyner	Dem	2014	Incumbent re-elected.	Latoya Joyner (D) 96% Carmichael (R) 3% Benjamin Eggleston (C) 0.4%
78	Jose Rivera	Dem	2000	Incumbent re-elected.	Jose Rivera (D) 94% Michael Walters (R) 7%
79	Michael Blake	Dem	2014	Incumbent re-elected.	Michael Blake (D) 96% Gregory Torres (R) 3% Margaret Fasano (C) 1%
80	Nathalia Fernandez	Dem	2018+	Incumbent re-elected.	Nathalia Fernandez (D) 86% Louis Perri (R) 14%
81	Jeffrey Dinowitz	Dem	1994+	Incumbent re-elected.	Jeffrey Dinowitz (D) 88% Alan Reed (R) 12%
82	Michael Benedetto	Dem	2004	Incumbent re-elected.	Michael Benedetto (D) 82% Elizabeth English (R) 16% William Britt Jr. (C) 2%
83	Carl Heastie	Dem	2000	Incumbent re-elected.	Carl Heastie (D) 97% Aston Lee (R) 2% Regina Cartagena (C) 1%
84	Carmen Arroyo	Dem	1994+	Incumbent re-elected.	Carmen Arroyo (D) 90% Amanda Septimo (WF) 6% Rosaline Nieves (R) 4% Oswald Denis (C) 1%
85	Marcos Crespo	Dem	2009+	Incumbent re-elected.	Marcos Crespo (D) 95% Shonde Lennon (R) 4% Joseph Bogdany (C) 1%
86	Victor Pichardo	Dem	2013+	Incumbent re-elected.	Victor Pichardo (D) 96% Ariel Rivera-Diaz (R) 4% Jose Marte (C) 1%
87	Vacant	Dem		Incumbent resigned April 30, 2018, to take office as a state senator. Democratic hold.	Karines Reyes (D) 94% Alpheaus Marcus (R) 5% Michael Dennis (C) 1%
88	Amy Paulin	Dem	2000	Incumbent re-elected.	Amy Paulin (D) 100%
89	J. Gary Pretlow	Dem	1992	Incumbent re-elected.	J. Gary Pretlow (D) 100%
90	Vacant	Dem		Incumbent resigned April 30, 2018, to take office as a state senator. Democratic hold.	Nader Sayegh (D) 65% Joe Pinion (R) 35%
91	Steven Otis	Dem	2012	Incumbent re-elected.	Steven Otis (D) 100%
92	Thomas J. Abinanti	Dem	2010	Incumbent re-elected.	Thomas J. Abinanti (D) 100%
93	David Buchwald	Dem	2012	Incumbent re-elected.	David Buchwald (D) 69% John Nuculovic (R) 31%
94	Kevin Byrne	Rep	2016	Incumbent re-elected.	Kevin Byrne (R) 58% Vedat Gashi (D) 42%
95	Sandy Galef	Dem	1992	Incumbent re-elected.	Sandy Galef (D) 68% Lawrence Chiulli (R) 32%
96	Kenneth Zebrowski Jr.	Dem	2007+	Incumbent re-elected.	Kenneth Zebrowski Jr. (D) 100%
97	Ellen Jaffee	Dem	2006	Incumbent re-elected.	Ellen Jaffee (D) 62% Rosario Presti Jr. (R) 38%
98	Karl A. Brabenec	Rep	2014	Incumbent re-elected.	Karl A. Brabenec (R) 63% Scott Martens (D) 38%
99	James Skoufis	Dem	2012	Incumbent retired to run for State Senate. Republican gain.	Colin Schmitt (R) 53% Matthew Rettig (D) 47%
100	Aileen Gunther	Dem	2003+	Incumbent re-elected.	Aileen Gunther (D) 100%
101	Brian Miller	Rep	2016	Incumbent re-elected.	Brian Miller (R) 59% Chad McEvoy (D) 41%
102	Christopher Tague	Rep	2018+	Incumbent re-elected.	Christopher Tague (R) 57% Aidan O'Connor Jr. (D) 43%
103	Kevin A. Cahill	Dem	1998	Incumbent re-elected.	Kevin A. Cahill (D) 100%
104	Vacant	Dem		Incumbent died on April 15, 2018. Democratic hold.	Jonathan Jacobson (D) 60% Scott Manley (R) 40%
105	Kieran Lalor	Rep	2012	Incumbent re-elected.	Kieran Lalor (R) 58% Laurette Giardino (D) 42%
106	Didi Barrett	Dem	2012+	Incumbent re-elected.	Didi Barrett (D) 54% Will Truitt (R) 46%
107	Jake Ashby	Rep	2018+	Incumbent re-elected.	Jake Ashby (R) 52% Tistrya Houghtling (D) 49%
108	John T. McDonald III	Dem	2012	Incumbent re-elected.	John T. McDonald III (D) 100%
109	Patricia Fahy	Dem	2012	Incumbent re-elected.	Patricia Fahy (D) 71% Robert Porter (R) 24% Joseph Sullivan (C) 5%
110	Phillip Steck	Dem	2012	Incumbent re-elected.	Phillip Steck (D) 60% Christopher Carey (R) 40%
111	Angelo Santabarbara	Dem	2012	Incumbent re-elected.	Angelo Santabarbara (D) 54% Brian McGarry (R) 46%
112	Mary Beth Walsh	Rep	2016	Incumbent re-elected.	Mary Beth Walsh (R) 100%
113	Carrie Woerner	Dem	2014	Incumbent re-elected.	Carrie Woerner (D) 57% Morgan Zegers (R) 44%
114	Dan Stec	Rep	2012	Incumbent re-elected.	Dan Stec (R) 81% Katie Wilson (WF) 19%
115	Billy Jones	Dem	2016	Incumbent re-elected.	Billy Jones (D) 100%
116	Addie Jenne	Dem	2008	Incumbent lost reelection. Republican gain.	Mark Walczyk (R) 54% Addie Jenne (D) 46%
117	Ken Blankenbush	Rep	2010	Incumbent re-elected.	Ken Blankenbush (R) 100%
118	Marc W. Butler	Rep	1995+	Incumbent retired. Republican hold.	Robert Smullen (R) 64% Keith Rubino (D) 36%
119	Anthony Brindisi	Dem	2011+	Incumbent retired to run for Congress. Democratic hold.	Marianne Buttenschon (D) 55% Dennis Bova (R) 45%
120	William A. Barclay	Rep	2002	Incumbent re-elected.	William A. Barclay (R) 69% Gail Tosh (D) 31%
121	Bill Magee	Dem	1990	Incumbent lost reelection. Republican gain.	John Salka (R) 51% Bill Magee (D) 49%
122	Clifford Crouch	Rep	1995+	Incumbent re-elected.	Clifford Crouch (R) 85% Nick Libous (C) 15%
123	Donna Lupardo	Dem	2004	Incumbent re-elected.	Donna Lupardo (D) 100%
124	Christopher S. Friend	Rep	2010	Incumbent re-elected.	Christopher S. Friend (R) 63% Bill Batrowny (D) 38%
125	Barbara Lifton	Dem	2002	Incumbent re-elected.	Barbara Lifton (D) 100%
126	Gary Finch	Rep	1999+	Incumbent re-elected.	Gary Finch (R) 57% Keith Batman (D) 43%
127	Albert A. Stirpe Jr.	Dem	2012	Incumbent re-elected.	Albert A. Stirpe Jr. (D) 58% Nicholas Paro (R) 42%
128	Pamela Hunter	Dem	2015+	Incumbent re-elected.	Pamela Hunter (D) 100%
129	William Magnarelli	Dem	1998	Incumbent re-elected.	William Magnarelli (D) 74% Edward Ott (R) 22% Michael Hunter (C) 4%
130	Bob Oaks	Rep	1992	Incumbent retired. Republican hold.	Brian Manktelow (R) 67% Scott Comegys (D) 33%
131	Brian Kolb	Rep	2000+	Incumbent re-elected.	Brian Kolb (R) 100%
132	Phil Palmesano	Rep	2010	Incumbent re-elected.	Phil Palmesano (R) 100%
133	Joseph Errigo	Rep	2016+	Incumbent lost renomination. Republican hold.	Marjorie Byrnes (R) 55% Barbara Baer (D) 42% Joseph Errigo (Ind) 3%
134	Peter Lawrence	Rep	2014	Incumbent re-elected.	Peter Lawrence (R) 100%
135	Mark Johns	Rep	2010	Incumbent re-elected.	Mark Johns (R) 53% Andrew Gilchrist (D) 48%
136	Joseph Morelle	Dem	1990	Incumbent retired to run for Congress. Democratic hold.	Jamie Romeo (D) 100%
137	David Gantt	Dem	1982	Incumbent re-elected.	David Gantt (D) 100%
138	Harry Bronson	Dem	2010	Incumbent re-elected.	Harry Bronson (D) 66% Patsy Iacovangelo (R) 34%
139	Stephen Hawley	Rep	2006+	Incumbent re-elected.	Stephen Hawley (R) 92% Mark Glogowski (L) 8%
140	Robin Schimminger	Dem	1976	Incumbent re-elected.	Robin Schimminger (D) 70% Adam Ohar (R) 26% Brian Phillips (WEP) 2% Anthony Baney (G) 1%
141	Crystal Peoples-Stokes	Dem	2002	Incumbent re-elected.	Crystal Peoples-Stokes (D) 91% Ross Kostecky (R) 10%
142	Erik Bohen	Ind. Dem	2018+	Incumbent lost reelection. Democratic gain.	Patrick Burke (D) 52% Erik Bohen (R) 45% Michelle Kennedy (Ind) 3%
143	Monica P. Wallace	Dem	2016	Incumbent re-elected.	Monica Wallace (D) 58% Daniel Centinello (R) 42%
144	Michael Norris	Rep	2016	Incumbent re-elected.	Michael Norris (R) 63% Joseph DiPasquale (D) 37%
145	Angelo Morinello	Rep	2016	Incumbent re-elected.	Angelo Morinello (R) 100%
146	Raymond Walter	Rep	2010	Incumbent lost reelection. Democratic gain.	Karen McMahon (D) 53% Raymond Walter (R) 47% Danilo Lawvere (G) 1%
147	David DiPietro	Rep	2012	Incumbent re-elected.	David DiPietro (R) 61% Luke Wochensky (D) 39%
148	Joseph Giglio	Rep	2005+	Incumbent re-elected.	Joseph Giglio (R) 100%
149	Sean Ryan	Dem	2011+	Incumbent re-elected.	Sean Ryan (D) 72% Joseph Totaro (R) 28%
150	Andy Goodell	Rep	2010	Incumbent re-elected.	Andy Goodell (R) 69% Judith Einach (D) 31%

- +Elected in a special election.

== Detailed results ==
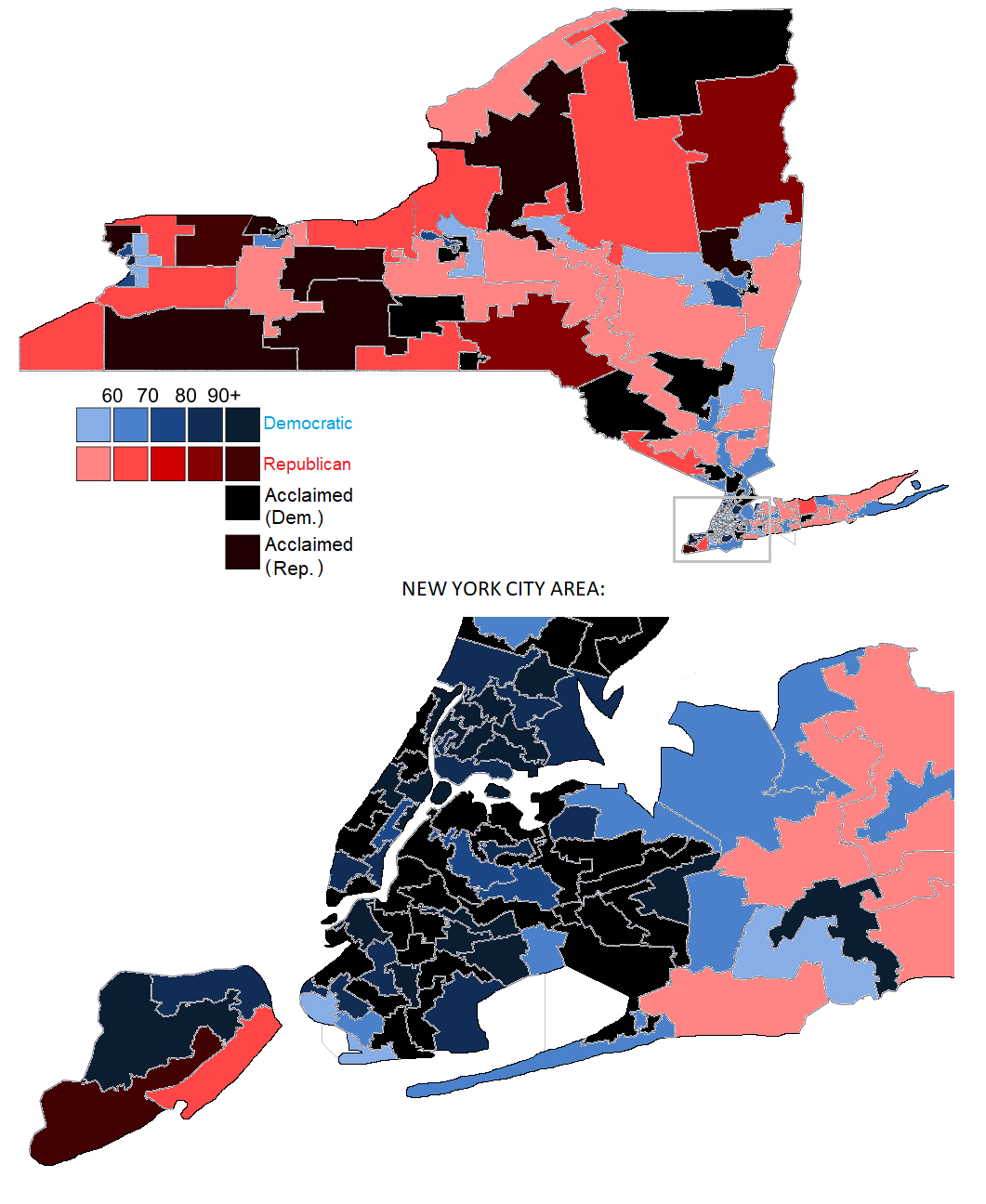
Vote share of each candidate by main party per district. Candidates can run on multiple parties in New York; the shading is the sum of votes a candidate received for all parties, although only the main party is used for shading. Although Fred Thiele of the 1st district is mainly associated with the Independence Party, he received most of his votes as a Democrat and is thus noted here.
