= New York's 18th State Assembly district =

American legislative district

Assemblymember
Noah Burroughs; D–Hempstead

New York's 18th State Assembly district is one of the 150 districts in the New York State Assembly. It has been represented by Democrat Noah Burroughs since 2025, succeeding Taylor Darling. In 2024, she announced that she would run for a seat in the New York State Senate, and will not run for re-election in the Assembly.

== Geography ==
=== 2020s ===
District 18 is in Nassau County. It contains parts of the town of Hempstead, including most of the villages of Hempstead, Roosevelt, and Lakeview and portions of Freeport and Uniondale.

The district is entirely within New York's 4th congressional district, and entirely within New York's 6th State Senate district.

=== 2010s ===
District 18 is in Nassau County. It contains parts of the town of Hempstead, including the village of Hempstead, Roosevelt, Freeport, Lakeview, and Uniondale and portions of East Meadow.

== Recent election results ==
=== 2026 ===
2026 New York State Assembly election, District 18
Party	Candidate	Votes	%
Democratic	Noah Burroughs		
Working Families	Noah Burroughs		
Total	Noah Burroughs (incumbent)		
Republican	Charlene Jackson		
Conservative	Charlene Jackson		
Total	Charlene Jackson		
Write-in			
Total votes			

=== 2024 ===
2024 New York State Assembly election, District 18
Primary election
Party	Candidate	Votes	%
Democratic	Noah Burroughs	2,918	52.6
Democratic	Lisa Ortiz	2,615	47.1
Write-in		18	0.3
Total votes		5,551	100.0
General election
Democratic	Noah Burroughs	32,854	
Working Families	Noah Burroughs	553	
Total	Noah Burroughs	33,407	82.0
Republican	Danielle Smikle	6,521	
Conservative	Danielle Smikle	749	
Total	Danielle Smikle	7,270	17.9
Write-in		40	0.1
Total votes		40,717	100.0
Democratic hold			

=== 2022 ===
2022 New York State Assembly election, District 18
Party	Candidate	Votes	%
Democratic	Taylor Darling	20,260	
Working Families	Taylor Darling	472	
Total	Taylor Darling (incumbent)	20,732	84.8
Republican	LaMont Johnson	3,300	
Conservative	LaMont Johnson	403	
Total	LaMont Johnson	3,703	15.1
Write-in		20	0.1
Total votes		24,455	100.0
Democratic hold			

=== 2020 ===
2020 New York State Assembly election, District 18
Party	Candidate	Votes	%
Democratic	Taylor Darling (incumbent)	36,878	84.2
Republican	Cherice Vanderhall	5,734	
Conservative	Cherice Vanderhall	961	
Total	Cherice Vanderhall	6,695	15.2
Write-in		244	0.6
Total votes		43,817	100.0
Democratic hold			

=== 2018 ===
2018 New York State Assembly election, District 18
Primary election
Party	Candidate	Votes	%
Democratic	Taylor Raynor	6,345	53.5
Democratic	Earlene Hooper (incumbent)	5,523	46.5
Write-in		0	0.0
Total votes		11,868	100
General election
Democratic	Taylor Raynor	29,362	
Working Families	Taylor Raynor	379	
Women's Equality	Taylor Raynor	200	
Reform	Taylor Raynor	48	
Total	Taylor Raynor	29,989	86.1
Republican	James Lamarre	2,893	
Conservative	James Lamarre	388	
Total	James Lamarre	3,281	9.4
Write-in		1,569	4.5
Total votes		34,839	100.0
Democratic hold			

=== 2016 ===
2016 New York State Assembly election, District 18
Primary election
Party	Candidate	Votes	%
Democratic	Earlene Hooper (incumbent)	2,271	60.0
Democratic	Carmen Pineyro	1,513	40.0
Write-in		0	0.0
Total votes		3,784	100
General election
Democratic	Earlene Hooper	36,419	
Women's Equality	Earlene Hooper	592	
Total	Earlene Hooper (incumbent)	37,011	88.0
Republican	Cornelius Smith	4,227	
Conservative	Cornelius Smith	675	
Reform	Cornelius Smith	128	
Total	Cornelius Smith	5,030	12.0
Write-in		23	0.0
Total votes		42,064	100.0
Democratic hold			

=== 2014 ===
2014 New York State Assembly election, District 18
Party	Candidate	Votes	%
Democratic	Earlene Hooper	16,513	
Independence	Earlene Hooper	517	
Total	Earlene Hooper (incumbent)	17,030	84.1
Republican	Cornelius Smith	2,686	
Conservative	Cornelius Smith	469	
Tax Revolt Party	Cornelius Smith	65	
Total	Cornelius Smith	3,220	15.9
Write-in		10	0.0
Total votes		20,260	100.0
Democratic hold			

=== 2012 ===
2012 New York State Assembly election, District 18
Party	Candidate	Votes	%
Democratic	Earlene Hooper	35,070	
Independence	Earlene Hooper	501	
Total	Earlene Hooper (incumbent)	35,571	90.2
Republican	Elton McCabe	3,247	
Conservative	Elton McCabe	601	
Total	Elton McCabe	3,848	9.8
Write-in		10	0.0
Total votes		39,429	100.0
Democratic hold			

=== 2010 ===
2010 New York State Assembly election, District 18
Party	Candidate	Votes	%
Democratic	Earlene Hooper	20,169	
Independence	Earlene Hooper	497	
Total	Earlene Hooper (incumbent)	20,666	83.0
Republican	Derek Partee	3,662	
Conservative	Derek Partee	558	
Total	Derek Partee	4,220	16.9
Write-in		13	0.1
Total votes		24,899	100.0
Democratic hold			
