= New York's 118th State Assembly district =

American legislative district

Assemblymember
Robert Smullen; R–Johnstown

New York's 118th State Assembly district is one of the 150 districts in the New York State Assembly. It has been represented by Robert Smullen since 2019.

== Geography ==
=== 2020s ===
==== 2023-2030 ====
District 118 contains a majority of Herkimer and Fulton counties, all of Hamilton County, and portions of Oneida, Otsego and Montgomery counties. It contains the cities of Johnstown, Gloversville, and Little Falls, as well as the towns of Hope, Indian Lake, Lake Pleasant, Wells, Inlet, Benson, Morehouse, Arietta, Long Lake, Bleecker, Caroga, Oppenheim, Ephratah, Mayfield, Johnstown, St. Johnsville, Minden, Palatine, Canajoharie, Mohawk, Glen, Charleston, Richfield, Columbia, Russia, Norway, Ohio, Salisbury, Fairfield, Newport, Herkimer, German Flatts, Webb, Manheim, Frankfort, Schuyler, Stark, Danube, Remsen, Trenton, Steuben, and Western.

The district (partially) overlaps with New York's 19th and 21st congressional districts, as well as the 45th, 49th, 51st and 53rd districts of the New York State Senate.

=== 2010s ===
District 118 contains a majority of Herkimer County, all of Hamilton and Fulton counties, and portions of Oneida and St. Lawrence counties. It includes the cities of Gloverville and Johnstown, as well as the towns of Hope, Indian Lake, Lake Pleasant, Wells, Inlet, Benson, Morehouse, Arietta, Long Lake, Bleecker, Caroga, Oppenheim, Ephratah, Mayfield, Johnstown, Northampton, Perth, Broadalbin, Russia, Norway, Ohio, Salisbury, Fairfield, Newport, Herkimer, Webb, Manheim, Danube, Schuyler, Stark, Fine, Clifton, Colton, Clare, Pierrepont, Parishville, Stockholm, Norfolk, Madrid, Trenton, Steuben, Western, Deerfield, Boonville, and Lee.

== Recent election results ==
=== 2026 ===
2026 New York State Assembly election, District 118
Primary election
Party	Candidate	Votes	%
Republican	Heather Scribner	4,383	40.0
Republican	Charles Potter	3,710	33.9
Republican	Chanda King	2,849	26.0
Write-in		14	0.1
Total votes		10,956	100.0
General election
Republican	Heather Scribner		
Conservative	Heather Scribner		
Total	Heather Scribner		
Democratic	Colleen Maxwell		
Write-in			
Total votes			100.0

=== 2024 ===
2024 New York State Assembly election, District 118
Party	Candidate	Votes	%
Republican	Robert Smullen	43,873	
Conservative	Robert Smullen	6,377	
Total	Robert Smullen (incumbent)	50,250	99.1
Write-in		432	0.9
Total votes		50,682	100.0
Republican hold			

=== 2022 ===
2022 New York State Assembly election, District 118
Party	Candidate	Votes	%
Republican	Robert Smullen	34,418	
Conservative	Robert Smullen	4,845	
Total	Robert Smullen (incumbent)	39,263	99.6
Write-in		68	0.4
Total votes		39,331	100.0
Republican hold			

=== 2020 ===
2020 New York State Assembly election, District 118
Party	Candidate	Votes	%
Republican	Robert Smullen	40,351	
Conservative	Robert Smullen	4,591	
Independence	Robert Smullen	2,860	
SAM	Robert Smullen	116	
Total	Robert Smullen (incumbent)	48,098	99.6
Write-in		197	0.4
Total votes		48,295	100.0
Republican hold			

=== 2018 ===
2018 New York State Assembly election, District 118
Primary election
Party	Candidate	Votes	%
Republican	Robert Smullen	4,499	57.8
Republican	Patrick Vincent	3,279	42.2
Write-in		0	0.0
Total votes		7,778	100
Conservative	Robert Smullen	98	53.3
Conservative	Patrick Vincent	86	46.7
Write-in		0	0.0
Total votes		184	100
General election
Republican	Robert Smullen	25,232	
Conservative	Robert Smullen	2,580	
Reform	Robert Smullen	277	
Total	Robert Smullen	28,209	63.3
Democratic	Keith Rubino	15,137	
Working Families	Keith Rubino	1,126	
Total	Keith Rubino	16,263	36.5
Write-in		118	0.2
Total votes		44,590	100.0
Republican hold			

=== 2016 ===
2016 New York State Assembly election, District 118
Primary election
Party	Candidate	Votes	%
Republican	Marc Butler (incumbent)	5,595	66.0
Republican	Patrick Vincent	2,877	34.0
Write-in		0	0.0
Total votes		8,472	100
General election
Republican	Marc Butler	35,359	
Conservative	Marc Butler	3,891	
Independence	Marc Butler	2,833	
Reform	Marc Butler	482	
Total	Marc Butler (incumbent)	42,565	99.6
Write-in		152	0.4
Total votes		42,717	100.0
Republican hold			

=== 2014 ===
2014 New York State Assembly election, District 118
Party	Candidate	Votes	%
Republican	Marc Butler	23,860	
Conservative	Marc Butler	4,296	
Total	Marc Butler (incumbent)	27,976	99.7
Write-in		80	0.3
Total votes		28,056	100.0
Republican hold			

=== 2012 ===
2012 New York State Assembly election, District 118
Party	Candidate	Votes	%
Republican	Marc Butler	22,635	
Conservative	Marc Butler	2,648	
Independence	Marc Butler	1,402	
Total	Marc Butler (incumbent)	26,685	68.1
Democratic	Joseph Chielli	12,503	31.9
Write-in		12	0.0
Total votes		39,200	100.0
Republican hold			
