= Noah Burroughs =

New York politician

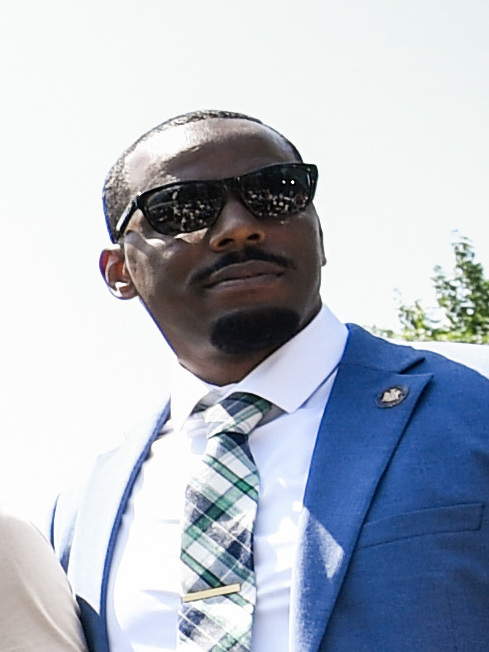
- Burroughs in 2025

Member of the New York State Assembly from the 18th district
- Incumbent
- Assumed office January 1, 2025
- Preceded by: Taylor Darling

Personal details
- Born: June 11, 1976 (age 50) Hempstead (village), New York, U.S.
- Party: Democratic
- Education: Nassau Community College (AA); University at Buffalo (BA); Touro College (MA)
- Website: Campaign website

Noah Burroughs (born June 11, 1976) is an American Democratic Party politician and former American football player who was elected to represent New York State Assembly district 18 in the 2024 general election for the 2025–2026 term. The district includes Hempstead, Baldwin, Freeport, Lakeview, Roosevelt, and Uniondale, all in Nassau County.

== Personal life ==
Burroughs studied Sociology at the University at Buffalo, then received dual Masters Degrees of Science in special education and education administration from Touro University.

Burroughs played football for the New York Jets from 2000 to 2003, then coached football at Hempstead High School and Nassau Community College.

As of 2024, Burroughs had taught history for 20 years in Hempstead schools.

Burroughs cites his parents as inspirations for his political work, including his father, who worked alongside Martin Luther King Jr. in Atlanta during the civil rights movement.

== Politics ==
Burroughs is a member of the Democratic Party and Working Families Party (WFP). As other Democrats on Long Island chose other third-party lines or declined them altogether, with the left-wing Working Families Party increasingly seen as a liability in the mostly moderate suburbs, Burroughs was an exception and one of few WFP candidates to win their primary elections.

In 2021, he was elected a trustee of the Village of Hempstead, serving for 2022 and 2023. Burroughs advocated for water infrastructure improvements to address elevated levels of 1,4-dioxane and worked on improving parks. He also helped Hempstead build mixed-income housing as the village received a flow of asylum seekers.

=== Assembly campaign ===
Burroughs announced in April 2024 that he would run in the Democratic primary election for the 18th District after Taylor Darling announced her candidacy for the State Senate; he ran against Lisa Ortiz, president of the Lakeview Civic Association, for the Democratic Party's nomination. He won the primary election in June with 46.57% of the vote count to Ortiz's 43.65%. On November 5, 2024, Burroughs won the general election for District 18's Assembly seat with 82.1% of the vote, defeating Republican Danielle Smikle.

=== Platform ===
Burroughs campaigned on improvements to infrastructure, sewer and water utilities, and business areas in Roosevelt and Uniondale, as well as the security and quality of schools and the cost of housing on Long Island. He advocated that charter schools should not receive public funding, because they diverted money from public schools without needing to uphold the same standards. He also suggested restructuring of Nassau Community College and reforms at Nassau University Medical Center for its nepotism and budget deficits He suggested that tax breaks for restaurants and businesses could increase the number of such businesses and lower homeowners' tax burden.

New York State Assembly
Preceded by Taylor Darling	New York State Assembly, 18th District; January 6, 2025 –	Incumbent
