= Patrick Carroll (New York politician) =

American politician

Member of the New York State Assembly from the 96th district
- Incumbent
- Assumed office January 1, 2025
- Preceded by: Kenneth Zebrowski Jr.

Personal details
- Born: Glocester, Rhode Island, U.S.
- Party: Democratic
- Education: Wesleyan University; Northeastern Law School
- Website: Campaign website Official website

Patrick J. Carroll is an American politician who is a member of the New York State Assembly for the 96th district, which is located within Rockland County.

== Early life and education ==
Originally from Glocester, Rhode Island, Carroll's mother, Mary Ann, served on the town's council and in the Rhode Island House of Representatives. He is a graduate of Northeastern University School of Law and Wesleyan University. In 2024, as he announced his candidacy for New York Assembly, he was working as an Administrative Law Judge for the state.

== Political career ==
Carroll served two terms on the town council of Glocester, Rhode Island. He was also a member of the town council in Clarkstown, elected in 2017. He served as a Councilman from 2018 through 2024.

He decided to run for District 96's Assembly seat immediately upon Kenneth Zebrowski announcing his decision not to run for re-election and quickly attracted endorsements from local Democrats. Democratic control of the seat was considered to be threatened, and with it the Democratic supermajority in the Assembly, with 100 seats required and 102 held by Democrats, including the 96th and a number of others considered competitive. Rockland County was considered a purple area, represented in United States Congress by Republican Mike Lawler but with a Democrat-supermajority county legislature, and where Governor Kathy Hochul underperformed in 2022. Carroll won the general election with 58.9% (36,467 votes) of the vote to Republican opponent Ronald Diz's 41.1% (25,465).

Carroll expresses support for local schools, environmental protections, and opposition to overdevelopment.

He is a long-time volunteer with Keep Rockland Beautiful.
