= New York's 127th State Assembly district =

American legislative district

Assemblymember
| Albert A. Stirpe Jr. D–North Syracuse |

New York's 127th State Assembly district is one of the 150 districts in the New York State Assembly. It has been represented by Democrat Albert Stirpe Jr. since 2013, and between 2007 and 2010.

== Geography ==
District 127 is in Onondaga County. It contains the towns of Cicero, Clay, Manlius, Pompey and Tully.

== Recent election results ==
=== 2026 ===
2026 New York State Assembly election, District 127
| Party | Candidate | Votes | % |
|---|---|---|---|
| Democratic | Albert Stirpe Jr. | | |
| Working Families | Albert Stirpe Jr. | | |
| Total | Albert Stirpe Jr. (incumbent) | | |
| Republican | Timothy Kelly | | |
| Conservative | Timothy Kelly | | |
| Total | Timothy Kelly | | |
| Write-in | | | |
| Total votes | | | |

=== 2024 ===
2024 New York State Assembly election, District 127
| Party | Candidate | Votes | % |
|---|---|---|---|
| Democratic | Albert Stirpe Jr. | 38,146 | |
| Working Families | Albert Stirpe Jr. | 3,134 | |
| Total | Albert Stirpe Jr. (incumbent) | 41,280 | 56.5 |
| Republican | Timothy Kelly | 27,595 | |
| Conservative | Timothy Kelly | 4,115 | |
| Total | Timothy Kelly | 31,710 | 43.4 |
| Write-in | | 41 | 0.1 |
| Total votes | | 73,031 | 100.0 |
| Democratic hold | | | |

=== 2022 ===
2022 New York State Assembly election, District 127
| Party | Candidate | Votes | % |
|---|---|---|---|
| Democratic | Albert Stirpe Jr. | 28,998 | |
| Working Families | Albert Stirpe Jr. | 2,081 | |
| Total | Albert Stirpe Jr. (incumbent) | 31,079 | 55.6 |
| Republican | Karen Ayoub | 21,016 | |
| Conservative | Karen Ayoub | 3,842 | |
| Total | Karen Ayoub | 24,858 | 44.4 |
| Write-in | | 20 | 0.0 |
| Total votes | | 55,957 | 100.0 |
| Democratic hold | | | |

=== 2020 ===
2020 New York State Assembly election, District 127
| Party | Candidate | Votes | % |
|---|---|---|---|
| Democratic | Albert Stirpe Jr. | 39,101 | |
| Working Families | Albert Stirpe Jr. | 3,118 | |
| Total | Albert Stirpe Jr. (incumbent) | 42,219 | 54.6 |
| Republican | Mark Venesky | 29,642 | |
| Conservative | Mark Venesky | 4,379 | |
| Independence | Mark Venesky | 1,129 | |
| Total | Mark Venesky | 35,150 | 45.4 |
| Write-in | | 23 | 0.0 |
| Total votes | | 77,392 | 100.0 |
| Democratic hold | | | |

=== 2018 ===
2018 New York State Assembly election, District 127
| Party | Candidate | Votes | % |
|---|---|---|---|
| Democratic | Albert Stirpe Jr. | 31,830 | |
| Working Families | Albert Stirpe Jr. | 1,304 | |
| Women's Equality | Albert Stirpe Jr. | 581 | |
| Reform | Albert Stirpe Jr. | 231 | |
| Total | Albert Stirpe Jr. (incumbent) | 33,946 | 58.0 |
| Republican | Nicholas Paro | 20,222 | |
| Conservative | Nicholas Paro | 3,394 | |
| Independence | Nicholas Paro | 951 | |
| Total | Nicholas Paro | 24,567 | 42.0 |
| Write-in | | 29 | 0.0 |
| Total votes | | 58,542 | 100.0 |
| Democratic hold | | | |

=== 2016 ===
2016 New York State Assembly election, District 127
Primary election
| Party | Candidate | Votes | % |
|---|---|---|---|
| Republican | Vincent Giordano | 913 | 51.4 |
| Republican | Michael Becallo | 864 | 48.6 |
| Write-in | | 0 | 0.0 |
| Total votes | | 1,777 | 100 |
General election
| Democratic | Albert Stirpe Jr. | 33,452 | |
| Working Families | Albert Stirpe Jr. | 2,426 | |
| Women's Equality | Albert Stirpe Jr. | 726 | |
| Total | Albert Stirpe Jr. (incumbent) | 36,604 | 56.1 |
| Republican | Vincent Giordano | 23,094 | |
| Independence | Vincent Giordano | 1,474 | |
| Total | Vincent Giordano | 24,568 | 37.7 |
| Conservative | Michael Becallo | 3,796 | |
| Reform | Michael Becallo | 268 | |
| Total | Michael Becallo | 4,064 | 6.2 |
| Write-in | | 25 | 0.0 |
| Total votes | | 65,261 | 100.0 |
| Democratic hold | | | |

=== 2014 ===
2014 New York State Assembly election, District 127
| Party | Candidate | Votes | % |
|---|---|---|---|
| Democratic | Albert Stirpe Jr. | 20,891 | |
| Working Families | Albert Stirpe Jr. | 2,329 | |
| Total | Albert Stirpe Jr. (incumbent) | 23,220 | 52.7 |
| Republican | Robert Demarco | 16,209 | |
| Conservative | Robert Demarco | 3,539 | |
| Independence | Robert Demarco | 1,066 | |
| Total | Robert Demarco | 20,814 | 47.2 |
| Write-in | | 38 | 0.1 |
| Total votes | | 44,072 | 100.0 |
| Democratic hold | | | |

=== 2012 ===
2012 New York State Assembly election, District 127
| Party | Candidate | Votes | % |
|---|---|---|---|
| Democratic | Albert Stirpe Jr. | 31,513 | |
| Working Families | Albert Stirpe Jr. | 2,857 | |
| Total | Albert Stirpe Jr. | 34,370 | 56.6 |
| Republican | Don Miller | 22,808 | |
| Conservative | Don Miller | 3,541 | |
| Independence | Don Miller | 1,742 | |
| Total | Don Miller (incumbent) | 26,349 | 43.4 |
| Write-in | | 36 | 0.0 |
| Total votes | | 60,755 | 100.0 |
| Democratic gain from Republican | | | |
