= Robert C. Wertz =

American politician

Robert Wertz

Member of the New York State Assembly
- In office January 1, 1971 – December 31, 2002
- Preceded by: Prescott B. Huntington
- Succeeded by: Michael Fitzpatrick (redistricting)
- Constituency: 4th district (1971-1982); 6th district (1983-2002)

Personal details
- Born: August 18, 1932 Kew Gardens, Queens, New York, US
- Died: May 5, 2009 (aged 76) Port Jefferson, New York, US
- Party: Republican
- Spouse: Dorothy
- Children: three
- Education: Alfred University; Albany Law School

Robert C. Wertz (August 18, 1932 – May 5, 2009) served for 32 years as a Republican member of the New York State Assembly.

== Life ==
Wertz was born in Kew Gardens, Queens. He attended Sewanhaka High School in Floral Park, New York. He received a Bachelor of Arts degree from Alfred University and a Juris Doctor degree from Albany Law School. Wertz served in the United States Marine Corps Reserve for six years with the 2nd Battalion 25th Marines.

Wertz worked for State Farm Insurance, after which he was a Senior Attorney in Appellate Division of the New York State Supreme Court. From 1967 through 1970, he served as Town Attorney for the Town of Smithtown, New York.

He was a member of the New York State Assembly from 1971 to 2002, sitting in the 179th, 180th, 181st, 182nd, 183rd, 184th, 185th, 186th, 187th, 188th, 189th, 190th, 191st, 192nd, 193rd and 194th New York State Legislatures. He left office in 2002, after losing to John J. Flanagan in a primary election for the New York State Senate.

Wertz and his wife Dorothy had three children: Mary, Donna, and Robert Wertz II.

New York State Assembly
Preceded by Prescott B. Huntington	New York State Assembly; 4th District; 1971–1982	Succeeded by George J. Hochbrueckner
Preceded by John C. Cochrane	New York State Assembly; 6th District; 1983–2002	Succeeded by Philip Ramos
