= New York's 39th State Assembly district =

American legislative district

Assemblymember
Catalina Cruz; D–Jackson Heights

New York's 39th State Assembly district is one of the 150 districts in the New York State Assembly. It has been represented by Catalina Cruz since 2019.

== Geography ==
=== 2020s ===
District 39 is in Queens. It encompasses the neighborhoods of Corona, Elmhurst, and Jackson Heights, as well as portions of Middle Village, Rego Park and Maspeth.

The district overlaps New York's 6th and 14th congressional districts, as well as the 12th, 13th and 15th districts of the New York State Senate, and the 21st, 24th, 25th and 30th districts of the New York City Council.

=== 2000s-2020s ===
District 39 is in Queens. It encompasses the neighborhoods of Corona, Elmhurst, and Jackson Heights, Queens.

=== 1990s-2000s ===
District 39 was in Brooklyn, and encompassed Mill Basin, Bergen Beach, and portions of Canarsie, East New York and Marine Park.

== Recent election results ==
=== 2026 ===
2026 New York State Assembly election, District 39
Primary election
Party	Candidate	Votes	%
Democratic	Catalina Cruz (incumbent)	5,449	91.0
Democratic	Yonel Letellier Sosa	483	8.1
Write-in		59	0.9
Total votes		5,991	100.0
General election
Democratic	Catalina Cruz		
Working Families	Catalina Cruz		
Total	Catalina Cruz (incumbent)		
Republican	Ramses Frias		
4 Our Immigrants	Ramses Frias		
Total	Ramses Frias		
Write-in			
Total votes			100.0

=== 2024 ===
2024 New York State Assembly election, District 39
Party	Candidate	Votes	%
Democratic	Catalina Cruz (incumbent)	19,859	97.4
Write-in		525	2.6
Total votes		20,384	100.0
Democratic hold			

=== 2022 ===
2022 New York State Assembly election, District 39
Party	Candidate	Votes	%
Democratic	Catalina Cruz	9,909	
Working Families	Catalina Cruz	2,400	
Total	Catalina Cruz (incumbent)	12,309	98.0
Write-in		251	2.0
Total votes		12,560	100.0
Democratic hold			

=== 2020 ===
2020 New York State Assembly election, District 39
Primary election
Party	Candidate	Votes	%
Democratic	Catalina Cruz (incumbent)	5,827	86.0
Democratic	Ramon Ramirez	915	13.5
Write-in		37	0.5
Total votes		6,779	100.0
General election
Democratic	Catalina Cruz (incumbent)	21,765	99.2
Write-in		171	0.8
Total votes		21,936	100.0
Democratic hold			

=== 2018 ===
2018 New York State Assembly election, District 39
Primary election
Party	Candidate	Votes	%
Democratic	Catalina Cruz	3,825	53.4
Democratic	Ari Espinal (incumbent)	3,093	43.2
Democratic	Yonel Sosa	233	3.3
Write-in		13	0.1
Total votes		7,164	100.0
General election
Democratic	Catalina Cruz	13,238	87.6
Working Families	Ari Espinal	1,321	
Women's Equality	Ari Espinal	258	
Total	Ari Espinal (incumbent)	1,579	10.5
Reform	Bobby Kalotee	262	1.7
Write-in		37	0.2
Total votes		15,116	100.0
Democratic hold			

=== 2018 special ===
Incumbent Francisco Moya resigned on December 31, 2017 to serve in the New York City Council, triggering a special election. In special elections for state legislative offices, primaries are usually not held – county committee members and district leaders for each party select nominees.

2018 New York State Assembly special election, District 39
Party	Candidate	Votes	%
Democratic	Ari Espinal	655	
Working Families	Ari Espinal	104	
Women's Equality	Ari Espinal	19	
Total	Ari Espinal	778	92.1
Write-in	Catalina Cruz	54	6.4
Write-in		13	1.5
Total votes		845	100.0
Democratic hold			

=== 2016 ===
2016 New York State Assembly election, District 39
Party	Candidate	Votes	%
Democratic	Francisco Moya	18,631	
Working Families	Francisco Moya	1,452	
Total	Francisco Moya (incumbent)	20,083	99.8
Write-in		47	0.2
Total votes		20,130	100.0
Democratic hold			

=== 2014 ===
2014 New York State Assembly election, District 39
Party	Candidate	Votes	%
Democratic	Francisco Moya	5,251	
Working Families	Francisco Moya	683	
Total	Francisco Moya (incumbent)	5,934	99.4
Write-in		35	0.6
Total votes		5,969	100.0
Democratic hold			

=== 2012 ===
2012 New York State Assembly election, District 39
Party	Candidate	Votes	%
Democratic	Francisco Moya	13,958	
Working Families	Francisco Moya	705	
Total	Francisco Moya (incumbent)	14,663	99.8
Write-in		31	0.2
Total votes		14,694	100.0
Democratic hold			

=== 2010 ===
2010 New York State Assembly election, District 39
Primary election
Party	Candidate	Votes	%
Democratic	Francisco Moya	2,788	66.1
Democratic	Hiram Monserrate	1,417	33.6
Write-in		16	0.3
Total votes		4,221	100.0
General election
Democratic	Francisco Moya	7,086	
Working Families	Francisco Moya	760	
Total	Francisco Moya	7,846	99.6
Write-in		34	0.4
Total votes		7,880	100.0
Democratic hold			

=== 2008 ===
2008 New York State Assembly election, District 39
Party	Candidate	Votes	%
Democratic	Jose Peralta	12,169	
Working Families	Jose Peralta	495	
Total	Jose Peralta (incumbent)	12,664	100.0
Write-in		0	0.0
Total votes		12,664	100.0
Democratic hold			

=== 2006 ===
2006 New York State Assembly election, District 39
Primary election
Party	Candidate	Votes	%
Democratic	Jose Peralta (incumbent)	2,890	80.6
Democratic	Carmen Enriquez	695	19.4
Write-in		2	0.1
Total votes		3,587	100.0
General election
Democratic	Jose Peralta	6,731	
Working Families	Jose Peralta	350	
Total	Jose Peralta (incumbent)	7,081	100.0
Write-in		1	0.0
Total votes		7,082	100.0
Democratic hold			

=== 2004 ===
2004 New York State Assembly election, District 39
Party	Candidate	Votes	%
Democratic	Jose Peralta	11,929	
Working Families	Jose Peralta	486	
Total	Jose Peralta (incumbent)	12,415	86.3
Republican	Giash Ahmed	1,966	13.7
Write-in		0	0.0
Total votes		14,381	100.0
Democratic hold			

=== 2002 ===
2002 New York State Assembly election, District 39
Primary election
Party	Candidate	Votes	%
Democratic	Jose Peralta	1,541	42.9
Democratic	Francisco Moya	1,271	35.4
Democratic	William Salgado	781	21.7
Write-in		0	0.0
Total votes		3,593	100.0
General election
Democratic	Jose Peralta	5,572	
Working Families	Jose Peralta	210	
Total	Jose Peralta	5,782	73.5
Republican	Charley Gonzales	1,706	
Independence	Charley Gonzales	153	
Conservative	Charley Gonzales	145	
Right to Life	Charley Gonzales	81	
Total	Charley Gonzales	2,085	26.5
Write-in		0	0.0
Total votes		7,867	100.0
Democratic win (new boundaries)			

=== 2000 ===
2000 New York State Assembly election, District 39
Party	Candidate	Votes	%
Democratic	Frank Seddio (incumbent)	24,640	78.0
Republican	Lori Sue Maslow	5,289	
Conservative	Lori Sue Maslow	564	
Working Families	Lori Sue Maslow	481	
Independence	Lori Sue Maslow	415	
Green	Lori Sue Maslow	208	
Total	Lori Sue Maslow	6,957	22.0
Write-in		1	0.0
Total votes		31,598	100.0
Democratic hold			

=== Federal results in Assembly District 39 ===
Year	Office	Results
2024	President	Harris 55.6 - 42.4%
2024	Senate	Gillibrand 61.3 - 37.6%
2022	Senate	Schumer 67.8 - 31.3%
2020	President	Biden 73.8 - 25.3%
2018	Senate	Gillibrand 86.9 - 13.0%
2016	President	Clinton 82.2 - 15.3%
2016	Senate	Schumer 85.4 - 12.2%
2012	President	Obama 84.7 - 14.3%
2012	Senate	Gillibrand 86.5 - 12.2%
