= Armand D'Amato =

American politician

Armand Paul D'Amato (born May 30, 1944) is an American lawyer and politician from New York.

== Life ==
D'Amato was born on May 30, 1944, in Newark, New Jersey. He attended St. Agnes Cathedral High School in Rockville Centre; St. John's University; and Suffolk University Law School.

He was a member of the New York State Assembly from 1973 to 1987, sitting in the 180th, 181st, 182nd, 183rd, 184th, 185th, 186th and 187th New York State Legislatures. He resigned his seat on February 23, 1987.

Armand D'Amato was charged with mail fraud in 1993 in relation to payoffs allegedly received from a defense contractor. He was later convicted of the charges, but this was later overturned upon an appeal to the Federal court.

Former Republican U.S. Senator Alfonse M. D'Amato is his brother, who is known for among other things having achieved the second longest filibuster in U.S. history.

New York State Assembly
Preceded by Irwin J. Landes	New York State Assembly; 18th District; 1973–1982	Succeeded by Barbara Patton
Preceded by Dean Skelos	New York State Assembly; 19th District; 1983–1987	Succeeded by Charles J. O'Shea
