= Jeffrey Brown (politician) =

American politician

Jeffrey "Jeff" Brown is a former Republican state assemblyman in New York. He represented suburban areas around Syracuse.

== Career ==
Brown was first elected to the Assembly in 2002, succeeding his father, former Assemblyman Harold Brown. An attorney, Brown worked in Congress and was the chief attorney for the New York State Department of Environmental Conservation in central New York State.

Brown serves as a captain in the 174th Fighter Wing at Hancock Field. He is currently the ranking minority member of the Assembly Veterans Affairs Committee.

Brown did not seek a third term in the Assembly in 2006. He instead ran for the State Senate, challenging one term Democratic Sen. David Valesky, who unseated Nancy Larraine Hoffmann, in what was expected to be one of the hottest races in upstate New York.

In fact, New York State senate majority leader Joe Bruno invested over $800,000 in Brown's campaign to unseat Valesky.

Despite being outspent by a wide margin, Valesky defeated Brown by about 59 percent to 41 percent. Bruno attributed the result to a general landslide for New York Democrats in 2006.

After leaving politics he joined the OCWA law practice.

New York State Assembly
Preceded by Harold C. Brown Jr.	New York State Assembly, 121st District; 2003–2006	Succeeded by Albert A. Stirpe, Jr.
