= Taylor Darling =

American politician

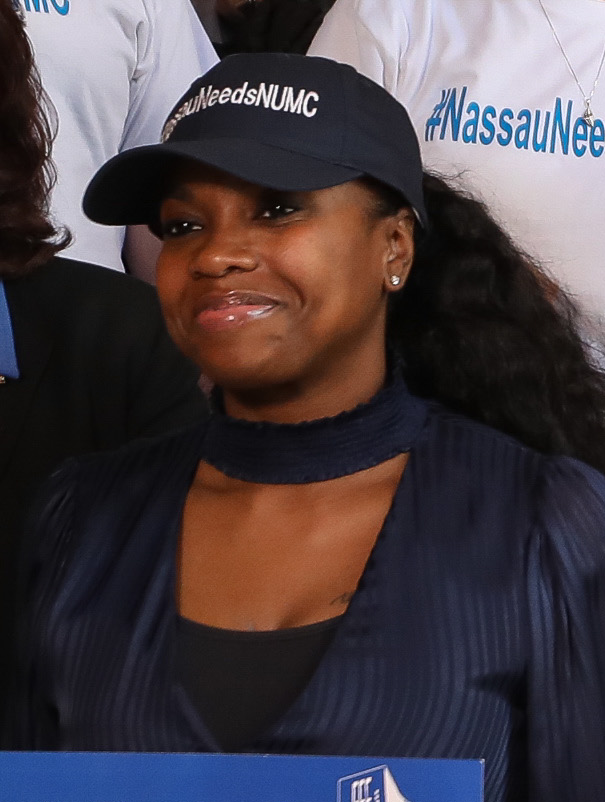

Member of the New York State Assembly from the 18th district
- In office January 1, 2019 – December 31, 2024
- Preceded by: Earlene Hooper
- Succeeded by: Noah Burroughs

Personal details
- Born: November 21, 1983 (age 42) New York City, New York, U.S.
- Party: Democratic
- Spouse: Reginald Rene
- Children: 3
- Education: Spelman College (BA); Hofstra University (MA)
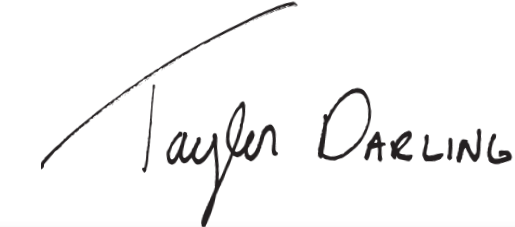
- Signature
- Website: State Assembly website

Taylor Darling (née Raynor) is an American psychologist and politician who served in the New York State Assembly representing the 18th District from 2019 to 2024. A Democrat, she represented part of Nassau County.

== Early life and education ==
Darling was born in Brooklyn to Raulston and Towana Bertley. Her father was of British, Nigerian, and Trinidadian descent and a convert to Judaism. She graduated from Spelman College with a Bachelor of Arts in psychology and Hofstra University with a Master of Arts in industrial/organizational psychology.

== Political career ==
Darling challenged incumbent Democratic Assemblymember Earlene Hooper in 2018. During a candidate forum, Hooper compared the race to a plantation and claimed Darling was a tool for White power brokers in the majority Black district. An anonymous mailer called Darling a "jezebel" and urged voters to "vote against fake Democrat and fake Christian Rayner [Darling]. Jesus sees your vote." She ultimately defeated Hooper in the Democratic primary with 52% of the vote.

=== 2024 State Senate campaign ===
Darling announced her campaign for the 6th district of the New York State Senate in 2024 after incumbent Democrat Kevin Thomas announced his intention to run for the United States House of Representatives. She lost the primary to Nassau County Legislature member Siela Bynoe.

=== 2026 U.S. House campaign ===
Darling announced in February 2026 that she is running in the 2026 midterm elections for U.S. House, challenging incumbent representative Laura Gillen in the Democratic primary. She said that she was recruited to run after Gillen voted in January to increase funding for the United States Department of Homeland Security.
