= New York's 96th State Assembly district =

American legislative district

Assemblymember
| Patrick Carroll; D–Bardonia |

New York's 96th State Assembly district is one of the 150 districts in the New York State Assembly. It has been represented by Patrick Carroll since 2025, succeeding Kenneth Zebrowski Jr.

== Geography ==
District 96 is located within Rockland County.

=== 2020s ===
It consists of the towns of Clarkstown and portions of the towns of Haverstraw and Orangetown.

The district is entirely within New York's 17th congressional district, as well as the 38th district of the New York State Senate.

=== 2010s ===
It consists of the towns of Clarkstown and Haverstraw and portions of Ramapo, including the villages of Pomona, Wesley Hills, and most of New Hempstead.

== Recent election results ==
=== 2026 ===
2026 New York State Assembly election, District 96
Primary election
| Party | Candidate | Votes | % |
|---|---|---|---|
| Democratic | Patrick Carroll (incumbent) | 6,745 | 80.5 |
| Democratic | Pottakulathu Thomas | 1,618 | 29.3 |
| Write-in | | 16 | 0.2 |
| Total votes | | 8,379 | 100.0 |
General election
| Democratic | Patrick Carroll | | |
| Working Families | Patrick Carroll | | |
| Total | Patrick Carroll (incumbent) | | |
| Republican | Brett Yagel | | |
| Conservative | Brett Yagel | | |
| Total | Brett Yagel | | |
| Write-in | | | |
| Total votes | | | |

=== 2024 ===
2024 New York State Assembly election, District 96
| Party | Candidate | Votes | % |
|---|---|---|---|
| Democratic | Patrick Carroll | 34,402 | |
| Working Families | Patrick Carroll | 2,031 | |
| Total | Patrick Carroll | 36,433 | 58.8 |
| Republican | Ronny Diz | 23,358 | |
| Conservative | Ronny Diz | 2,100 | |
| Total | Ronny Diz | 25,458 | 41.1 |
| Write-in | | 47 | 0.1 |
| Total votes | | 61,938 | 100.0 |
| Democratic hold | | | |

=== 2022 ===
2022 New York State Assembly election, District 96
| Party | Candidate | Votes | % |
|---|---|---|---|
| Democratic | Kenneth Zebrowski Jr. (incumbent) | 26,222 | 58.4 |
| Republican | Brett Yagel | 18,640 | 41.5 |
| Write-in | | 58 | 0.1 |
| Total votes | | 44,920 | 100.0 |
| Democratic hold | | | |

=== 2020 ===
2020 New York State Assembly election, District 96
| Party | Candidate | Votes | % |
|---|---|---|---|
| Democratic | Kenneth Zebrowski Jr. | 38,159 | |
| Working Families | Kenneth Zebrowski Jr. | 6,049 | |
| SAM | Kenneth Zebrowski Jr. | 1,231 | |
| Total | Kenneth Zebrowski Jr. (incumbent) | 45,439 | 99.3 |
| Write-in | | 343 | 0.7 |
| Total votes | | 45,782 | 100.0 |
| Democratic hold | | | |

=== 2018 ===
2018 New York State Assembly election, District 96
| Party | Candidate | Votes | % |
|---|---|---|---|
| Democratic | Kenneth Zebrowski Jr. | 30,381 | |
| Reform | Kenneth Zebrowski Jr. | 2,656 | |
| Working Families | Kenneth Zebrowski Jr. | 2,108 | |
| Women's Equality | Kenneth Zebrowski Jr. | 677 | |
| Total | Kenneth Zebrowski Jr. (incumbent) | 35,822 | 99.3 |
| Write-in | | 248 | 0.7 |
| Total votes | | 36,070 | 100.0 |
| Democratic hold | | | |

=== 2016 ===
2016 New York State Assembly election, District 96
| Party | Candidate | Votes | % |
|---|---|---|---|
| Democratic | Kenneth Zebrowski Jr. | 35,331 | |
| Working Families | Kenneth Zebrowski Jr. | 3,569 | |
| Reform | Kenneth Zebrowski Jr. | 2,351 | |
| Women's Equality | Kenneth Zebrowski Jr. | 859 | |
| Total | Kenneth Zebrowski Jr. (incumbent) | 42,110 | 99.5 |
| Write-in | | 211 | 0.5 |
| Total votes | | 42,321 | 100.0 |
| Democratic hold | | | |

=== 2014 ===
2014 New York State Assembly election, District 96
Primary election
| Party | Candidate | Votes | % |
|---|---|---|---|
| Democratic | Kenneth Zebrowski Jr. (incumbent) | 4,082 | 75.4 |
| Democratic | Pottakulathu Thomas | 1,329 | 24.6 |
| Write-in | | 0 | 0.0 |
| Total votes | | 5,411 | 100 |
| Working Families | Kenneth Zebrowski Jr. (incumbent) | 60 | 81.1 |
| Write-in | | 14 | 18.9 |
| Total votes | | 74 | 100 |
General election
| Democratic | Kenneth Zebrowski Jr. | 17,446 | |
| Working Families | Kenneth Zebrowski Jr. | 2,116 | |
| Preserve Hudson | Kenneth Zebrowski Jr. | 972 | |
| Total | Kenneth Zebrowski Jr. (incumbent) | 20,534 | 65.0 |
| Republican | Matthew Brennan | 11,026 | 34.9 |
| Write-in | | 24 | 0.1 |
| Total votes | | 31,584 | 100.0 |
| Democratic hold | | | |

=== 2012 ===
2012 New York State Assembly election, District 96
| Party | Candidate | Votes | % |
|---|---|---|---|
| Democratic | Kenneth Zebrowski Jr. | 35,360 | |
| Working Families | Kenneth Zebrowski Jr. | 3,139 | |
| Independence | Kenneth Zebrowski Jr. | 3,027 | |
| Total | Kenneth Zebrowski Jr. (incumbent) | 41,526 | 99.3 |
| Write-in | | 282 | 0.7 |
| Total votes | | 41,808 | 100.0 |
| Democratic hold | | | |
