= New York's 106th State Assembly district =

American legislative district

Assemblymember
Didi Barrett; D–Hudson

New York's 106th State Assembly district is one of the 150 districts in the New York State Assembly. It has been represented by Didi Barrett since 2013.

== Geography ==
=== 2020s ===
District 106 contains portions of Columbia and Dutchess counties. It includes the towns of Ancram, Canaan, Claverack, Germantown, Hudson, Livingston, Milan, Millbrook, Millerton, New Hamburg, New Lebanon, and Pleasant Valley.

The district overlaps (partially) with New York's 18th and 19th congressional districts, as well as the 39th and 41st districts of the New York State Senate.

=== 2010s ===
District 106 contained portions of Columbia and Dutchess counties. It included the towns of Amenia, Ancram, Claverack, Germantown, Hillsdale, Hudson, Livingston, Milan, Millerton, New Hamburg, Pleasant Valley and a portion of the towns of Chatham and Hillsdale.

== Recent election results ==
=== 2026 ===
2026 New York State Assembly election, District 106
Primary election
Party	Candidate	Votes	%
Democratic	Didi Barrett (incumbent)	6,486	72.9
Democratic	Samuel Hodge	2,398	27.0
Write-in		6	0.1
Total votes		8,890	100.0
General election
Democratic	Didi Barrett (incumbent)		
Republican	Gregory Campos		
Conservative	Gregory Campos		
Total	Gregory Campos		
Write-in			
Total votes			

=== 2024 ===
2024 New York State Assembly election, District 106
Primary election
Party	Candidate	Votes	%
Democratic	Didi Barrett (incumbent)	4,828	57.1
Democratic	Claire Cousin	3,623	42.9
Write-in		3	0.0
Total votes		8,454	100.0
General election
Democratic	Didi Barrett (incumbent)	40,541	57.2
Republican	Stephen Krakower	26,531	
Conservative	Stephen Krakower	3,688	
Total	Stephen Krakower	30,219	42.6
Write-in		100	0.2
Total votes		70,860	100.0
Democratic hold			

=== 2022 ===
2022 New York State Assembly election, District 106
Primary election
Party	Candidate	Votes	%
Republican	Brandon Gaylord	1,848	53.2
Republican	Dean Michael	1,619	46.6
Write-in		8	0.2
Total votes		3,475	100.0
General election
Democratic	Didi Barrett (incumbent)	30,671	54.4
Republican	Brandon Gaylord	22,353	
Conservative	Brandon Gaylord	3,335	
Total	Brandon Gaylord	25,688	45.6
Write-in		12	0.0
Total votes		56,371	100.0
Democratic hold			

=== 2020 ===
2020 New York State Assembly election, District 106
Party	Candidate	Votes	%
Democratic	Didi Barrett	32,848	
Working Families	Didi Barrett	3,563	
Independence	Didi Barrett	778	
Total	Didi Barrett (incumbent)	37,189	57.6
Republican	Dean Michael	24,012	
Conservative	Dean Michael	2,868	
Libertarian	Dean Michael	525	
Total	Dean Michael	27,405	42.4
Write-in		9	0.0
Total votes		64,603	100.0
Democratic hold			

=== 2018 ===
2018 New York State Assembly election, District 106
Primary election
Party	Candidate	Votes	%
Independence	Didi Barrett (incumbent)	261	50.7
Independence	William Truitt	254	49.3
Write-in		0	0.0
Total votes		515	100
Women's Equality	William Truitt	7	53.8
Women's Equality	Didi Barrett (incumbent)	6	46.2
Write-in		0	0.0
Total votes		13	100
General election
Democratic	Didi Barrett	26,498	
Working Families	Didi Barrett	1,382	
Independence	Didi Barrett	904	
Total	Didi Barrett (incumbent)	28,784	55.4
Republican	William Truitt	19,526	
Conservative	William Truitt	3,199	
Women's Equality	William Truitt	259	
Reform	William Truitt	176	
Total	William Truitt	23,160	44.6
Write-in		18	0.0
Total votes		51,962	100.0
Democratic hold			

=== 2016 ===
2016 New York State Assembly election, District 106
Party	Candidate	Votes	%
Democratic	Didi Barrett	26,535	
Working Families	Didi Barrett	2,237	
Independence	Didi Barrett	1,553	
Total	Didi Barrett (incumbent)	30,325	55.9
Republican	Terry Sullivan	20,290	
Conservative	Terry Sullivan	3,401	
Reform	Terry Sullivan	282	
Total	Terry Sullivan	23,973	44.1
Write-in		18	0.0
Total votes		54,316	100.0
Democratic hold			

=== 2014 ===
2014 New York State Assembly election, District 106
Party	Candidate	Votes	%
Democratic	Didi Barrett	15,103	
Working Families	Didi Barrett	1,813	
Independence	Didi Barrett	1,326	
Total	Didi Barrett (incumbent)	18,242	50.8
Republican	Michael Kelsey	14,206	
Conservative	Michael Kelsey	3,459	
Total	Michael Kelsey	17,665	49.2
Write-in		14	0.0
Total votes		35,921	100.0
Democratic hold			

=== 2012 ===
2012 New York State Assembly election, District 107
Primary election
Party	Candidate	Votes	%
Independence	David Byrne	205	53.4
Independence	Didi Barrett (incumbent)	179	46.6
Write-in		0	0.0
Total votes		384	100
General election
Democratic	Didi Barrett	25,729	
Working Families	Didi Barrett	2,568	
Total	Didi Barrett (incumbent)	28,297	54.3
Republican	David Byrne	18,809	
Conservative	David Byrne	3,578	
Independence	David Byrne	1,410	
Total	David Byrne	23,797	45.7
Write-in		20	0.0
Total votes		52,114	100.0
Democratic hold			
