= Barbara Patton =

American politician

Member of the New York State Assembly from the 18th district
- In office 1983–1988
- Preceded by: Armand P. D'Amato
- Succeeded by: Earlene Hill Hooper

Personal details
- Born: March 28, 1944 (age 82) Brooklyn, New York, U.S.
- Party: Democratic
- Education: Kingsborough Community College; Hofstra University
- Website: Official website

Barbara Patton (born March 28, 1944) is an American lawyer and politician from New York.

== Life ==
She was born on March 28, 1944, in Brooklyn. She attended St. Peter Claver Elementary School and All Saints Commercial High School. She married and had two children, and lived in Freeport, Nassau County, New York. When her children were in their early teens, she returned to school.

She graduated A.A.S. in Business Administration from Kingsborough Community College in 1976, B.A. in English from Hofstra University in 1979, and J.D. from Hofstra Law School in 1982.

She also entered politics as a Democrat. She was a member of the New York State Assembly (18th D.) from 1983 to 1988, sitting in the 185th, 186th and 187th New York State Legislatures. On May 18, 1987, Governor Mario Cuomo nominated Patton as Chairwoman of the New York State Workers' Compensation Board. She was confirmed by the State Senate in January 1988, and remained in office until 1994.

Afterwards she was a Vice President of Nynex, and took part in the company's merger with Bell Atlantic in 1997.

She was the Democratic Co-Commissioner of Elections for Nassau County from April 1999 to July 2002. She resigned this post to become an assistant professor of accounting, Taxation and Legal Studies in Business at Hofstra University's Frank G. Zarb School of Business.

In May 2003, she announced that she would run for Supervisor of the Town of Hempstead, but withdrew from the race in August.

New York State Assembly
Preceded by Armand P. D'Amato	New York State Assembly; 18th District; 1983–1988	Succeeded by Earlene Hill Hooper
