= New York's 13th State Assembly district =

American legislative district

Assemblymember
| Charles Lavine; D–Glen Cove |

New York's 13th State Assembly district is one of the 150 districts in the New York State Assembly. It has been represented by Democrat Charles Lavine since 2005.

== Geography ==
=== 2020s ===
District 13 is in Nassau County. It includes portions of the town of North Hempstead and Oyster Bay, including Hicksville, Old Westbury, Glen Cove, Sea Cliff, Bayville, and portions of Roslyn, New Cassel, Jericho and the hamlet of Oyster Bay.

The district is entirely within New York's 3rd congressional district, and overlaps the 5th, 6th and 7th districts of the New York State Senate.

=== 2010s ===
District 13 is in Nassau County. It includes portions of the town of North Hempstead and Oyster Bay, including Jericho, Glen Cove, Roslyn and Woodbury.

== Recent election results ==
=== 2026 ===
2026 New York State Assembly election, District 13
| Party | Candidate | Votes | % |
|---|---|---|---|
| Democratic | Charles Lavine (incumbent) | | |
| Republican | Connor Dunleavy | | |
| Conservative | Connor Dunleavy | | |
| Total | Connor Dunleavy | | |
| Write-in | | | |
| Total votes | | | |

=== 2024 ===
2024 New York State Assembly election, District 13
| Party | Candidate | Votes | % |
|---|---|---|---|
| Democratic | Charles Lavine (incumbent) | 30,850 | 54.9 |
| Republican | Ruka Anzai | 23,178 | |
| Conservative | Ruka Anzai | 2,022 | |
| Total | Ruka Anzai | 25,200 | 44.9 |
| Write-in | | 99 | 0.2 |
| Total votes | | 56,149 | 100.0 |
| Democratic hold | | | |

=== 2022 ===
2022 New York State Assembly election, District 13
| Party | Candidate | Votes | % |
|---|---|---|---|
| Democratic | Charles Lavine | 21,781 | |
| Working Families | Charles Lavine | 921 | |
| Total | Charles Lavine (incumbent) | 22,702 | 54.6 |
| Republican | Ruka Anzai | 17,261 | |
| Conservative | Ruka Anzai | 1,604 | |
| Total | Ruka Anzai | 18,865 | 45.4 |
| Write-in | | 28 | 0.0 |
| Total votes | | 41,595 | 100.0 |
| Democratic hold | | | |

=== 2020 ===
2020 New York State Assembly election, District 13
| Party | Candidate | Votes | % |
|---|---|---|---|
| Democratic | Charles Lavine | 38,082 | |
| Working Families | Charles Lavine | 1,364 | |
| Total | Charles Lavine (incumbent) | 39,446 | 63.1 |
| Republican | Andrew Monteleone | 20,772 | |
| Conservative | Andrew Monteleone | 1,766 | |
| Independence | Andrew Monteleone | 1,364 | |
| Total | Andrew Monteleone | 23,015 | 36.9 |
| Write-in | | 16 | 0.0 |
| Total votes | | 62,477 | 100.0 |
| Democratic hold | | | |

=== 2018 ===
2018 New York State Assembly election, District 13
| Party | Candidate | Votes | % |
|---|---|---|---|
| Democratic | Charles Lavine | 30,699 | |
| Working Families | Charles Lavine | 497 | |
| Women's Equality | Charles Lavine | 316 | |
| Reform | Charles Lavine | 90 | |
| Total | Charles Lavine (incumbent) | 31,602 | 68.1 |
| Republican | Andrew Monteleone | 13,451 | |
| Conservative | Andrew Monteleone | 1,353 | |
| Total | Andrew Monteleone | 14,804 | 31.9 |
| Write-in | | 14 | 0.0 |
| Total votes | | 46,420 | 100.0 |
| Democratic hold | | | |

=== 2016 ===
2016 New York State Assembly election, District 13
| Party | Candidate | Votes | % |
|---|---|---|---|
| Democratic | Charles Lavine | 33,042 | |
| Working Families | Charles Lavine | 871 | |
| Women's Equality | Charles Lavine | 401 | |
| Total | Charles Lavine (incumbent) | 34,314 | 62.7 |
| Republican | Jeffrey Vitale | 17,794 | |
| Conservative | Jeffrey Vitale | 1,783 | |
| Reform | Jeffrey Vitale | 158 | |
| Total | Jeffrey Vitale | 19,735 | 36.1 |
| Green | Jeffrey Peress | 648 | 1.2 |
| Write-in | | 16 | 0.0 |
| Total votes | | 54,713 | 100.0 |
| Democratic hold | | | |

=== 2014 ===
2014 New York State Assembly election, District 13
| Party | Candidate | Votes | % |
|---|---|---|---|
| Democratic | Charles Lavine | 16,071 | |
| Working Families | Charles Lavine | 677 | |
| Independence | Charles Lavine | 555 | |
| Women's Equality | Charles Lavine | 384 | |
| Total | Charles Lavine (incumbent) | 17,687 | 60.2 |
| Republican | Louis Imbroto | 9,920 | |
| Conservative | Louis Imbroto | 1,370 | |
| Total | Louis Imbroto | 11,290 | 38.4 |
| Green | Jeffrey Peress | 389 | 1.3 |
| Write-in | | 16 | 0.1 |
| Total votes | | 29,366 | 100.0 |
| Democratic hold | | | |

=== 2012 ===
2012 New York State Assembly election, District 13
| Party | Candidate | Votes | % |
|---|---|---|---|
| Democratic | Charles Lavine | 27,566 | |
| Working Families | Charles Lavine | 863 | |
| Independence | Charles Lavine | 660 | |
| Total | Charles Lavine (incumbent) | 29,089 | 63.3 |
| Republican | Louis Imbroto | 14,742 | |
| Conservative | Louis Imbroto | 1,728 | |
| Total | Louis Imbroto | 16,470 | 35.8 |
| Green | Jeffrey Peress | 395 | 0.9 |
| Write-in | | 6 | 0.0 |
| Total votes | | 45,960 | 100.0 |
| Democratic hold | | | |

=== 2010 ===
2010 New York State Assembly election, District 13
| Party | Candidate | Votes | % |
|---|---|---|---|
| Democratic | Charles Lavine | 19,905 | |
| Independence | Charles Lavine | 899 | |
| Working Families | Charles Lavine | 790 | |
| Total | Charles Lavine (incumbent) | 21,594 | 56.0 |
| Republican | Robert Germino Jr. | 14,977 | |
| Conservative | Robert Germino Jr. | 2,019 | |
| Total | Robert Germino Jr. | 16,996 | 44.0 |
| Write-in | | 6 | 0.0 |
| Total votes | | 38,596 | 100.0 |
| Democratic hold | | | |
