= Robert Smullen =

American politician (born 1968)

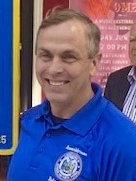
- Smullen in 2023

Member of the New York State Assembly from the 118th district
- Incumbent
- Assumed office January 9, 2019
- Preceded by: Marc W. Butler
- Succeeded by: Heather Scribner (elect)

Personal details
- Born: July 29, 1968 (age 58) Johnstown, New York, U.S.
- Party: Republican; Conservative (2026)
- Spouse: Megan
- Education: The Citadel (BA); Georgetown University (MA); Marine Corps University (MS); National Intelligence University (MS); National Defense University (MS)
- Website: State Assembly website

Robert J. Smullen (born July 29, 1968) is an American politician representing the 118th district in the New York State Assembly since 2019. The district covers parts of the North Country and Mohawk Valley. He is a member of the Republican Party.

== Career ==
Smullen served 24 years with the United States Marine Corps, retiring in 2015 at the rank of colonel. He was a White House Fellow in the Office of the Secretary of Energy in 2003 and 2004, and more recently worked as the executive director of the Hudson River–Black River Regulating District.

=== New York State Assembly ===
In April 2018, after longtime Republican Assemblyman Marc W. Butler announced his retirement, Smullen launched his campaign for the 118th Assembly district. Smullen defeated businessman Patrick Vincent in the Republican primary, and bested Democrat Keith Rubino in the November general election with 63% of the vote. He was re-elected in 2020, 2022 and 2024.

=== 2026 run for congress ===
Smullen was a primary candidate for New York's 21st congressional district in 2026 to replace Elise Stefanik, but was defeated by Anthony Constantino in the Republican primary. After losing the nomination, he made plans to run as a member of the Conservative Party but dropped out after meeting with President Donald Trump.

== Personal life ==
Smullen lives on a farm in Johnstown with his wife, Megan, and their children. His son, AJ, died in March 2024 after being struck by a car.

=== Legal issues ===
In July 2018, while running for the Assembly, Smullen was arrested after he accepted a tax exemption for veterans on two residences at once, a felony. Maintaining that the double filing had been a mistake, Smullen pleaded guilty to a reduced charge in May 2019 after he paid back the town of Niskayuna for the missing property tax.
