= Didi Barrett =

American politician

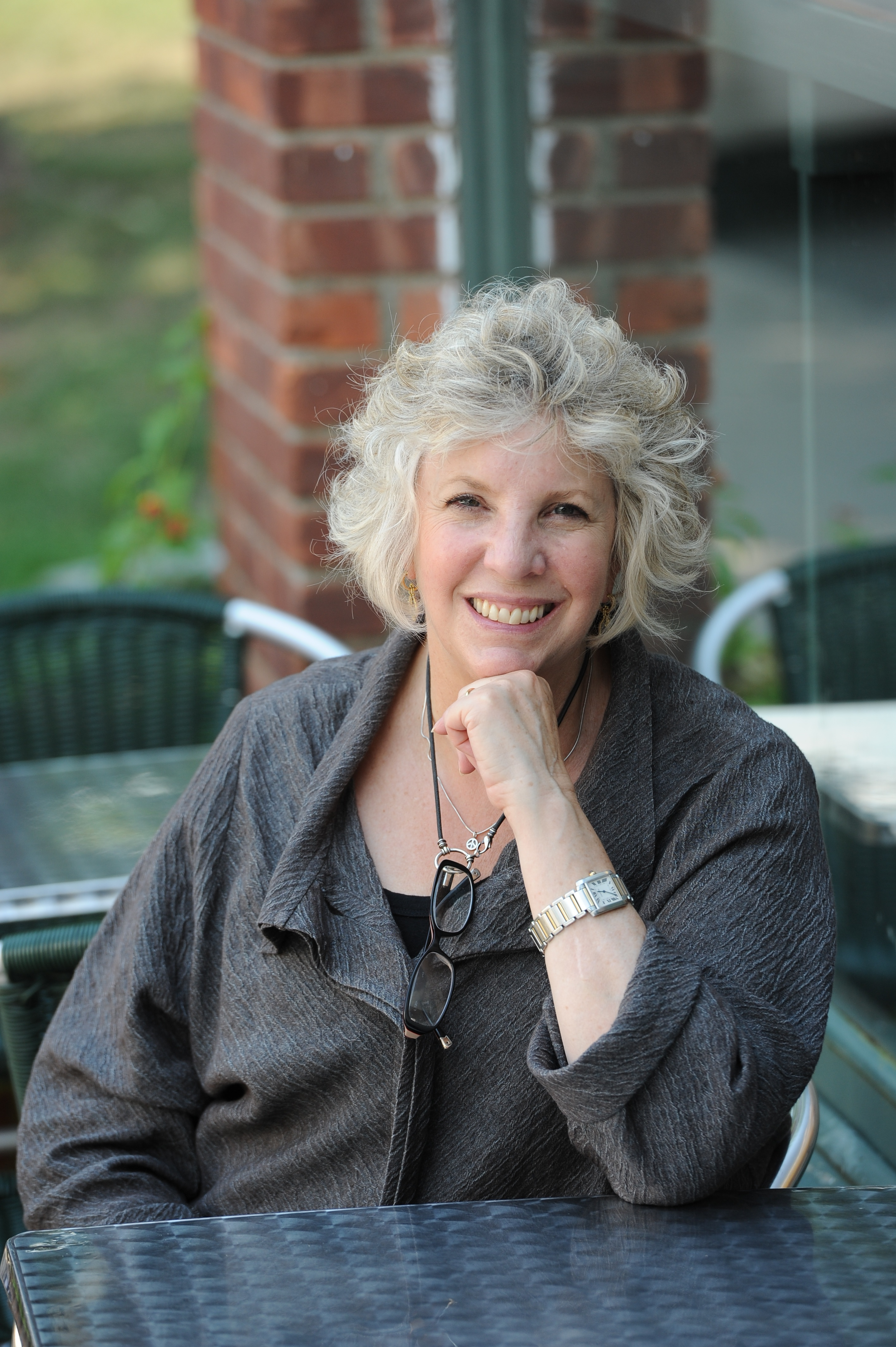

Member of the New York State Assembly from the 106th district
- Incumbent
- Assumed office 2012
- Preceded by: Marc Molinaro
- Constituency: 103rd district (2012–2013); 106th district (2013–)

Personal details
- Born: September 17, 1950 (age 76)
- Party: Democratic
- Children: 2
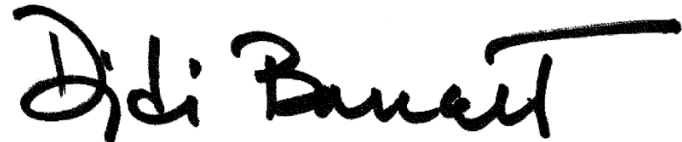
- Signature
- Website: Official website

Didi Barrett is an American politician serving as a Democratic member of the New York State Assembly representing Assembly District 106, which includes parts of Dutchess and Columbia Counties.

== Career ==
Barrett was elected to the Assembly on March 20, 2012, after a special election to succeed Marcus Molinaro. She serves on the board of the North East Dutchess Fund of the Berkshire Taconic Community Foundation, and is a trustee of the Anderson Foundation for Autism. She is also a founding chairwoman of Girls Incorporated of NYC, and a former board member of NARAL Pro-Choice New York. She is a trustee emeritus of the American Folk Art Museum.

As of July 2025, Barrett is chairperson of the New York State Assembly Standing Committee on Energy. She is also a member of the Committee on Environmental Conservation. As such, she has crucial authority over New York energy law.

== Elections ==
In November 2012, Barrett won re-election in the newly created 106th district seat with 54.3% of the vote. She was re-elected with 50.8% of the vote in November 2014, 55.85% of the vote in November 2016, and 55.4% of the vote in November 2018, and she once again won reelection in 2020.

New York State Assembly
| Preceded by Marcus Molinaro | New York State Assembly, 103rd District; 2012–2013 | Succeeded by Kevin Cahill |
| Preceded by Ronald Canestrari | New York State Assembly, 106th District; 2013–present | Incumbent |
