= Kenneth Zebrowski =

American politician

Kenneth Peter Zebrowski

Member of the New York State Assembly from the 94th district
- In office 2005–2007
- Preceded by: Alexander Gromack
- Succeeded by: Kenneth Paul Zebrowski

Personal details
- Born: November 12, 1945 Brooklyn, New York
- Died: March 18, 2007 (aged 61)
- Party: Democratic
- Spouse: Linda Zebrowski
- Children: 6
- Education: New York Law School
- Profession: lawyer, politician

Kenneth Peter Zebrowski (November 12, 1945 – March 18, 2007) was a Democratic member of the New York State Assembly.

== Early life and education ==
Born in Brooklyn, New York, Zebrowski received his Juris Doctor degree from the New York Law School in 1970.

== Career ==
Zebrowski served in the Rockland County legislature for 21 years, beginning in 1973 at the age of 29. He won five four-year terms over the next 31 years. He was "known as a foe of overdevelopment and a friend of senior citizens".

He was elected to the State Assembly in 2004 for a two-year term (2005–2007).

Zebrowski was diagnosed with hepatitis C and died of liver and kidney failure on March 18, 2007, at the age of 61.

== Family ==
Zebrowski was survived by his wife Linda and six children.

When his son Kenneth Paul Zebrowski graduated from law school, the two men founded the law firm of Zebrowski & Zebrowski. After Zebrowski died, Kenneth Jr. was elected to the same State Assembly seat.

Preceded by Alexander Gromack	New York State Assembly, 94th District; 2005–2007	Succeeded by Kenneth Zebrowski, Jr.
