= Catalina Cruz =

Colombian-American attorney, political activist, and politician

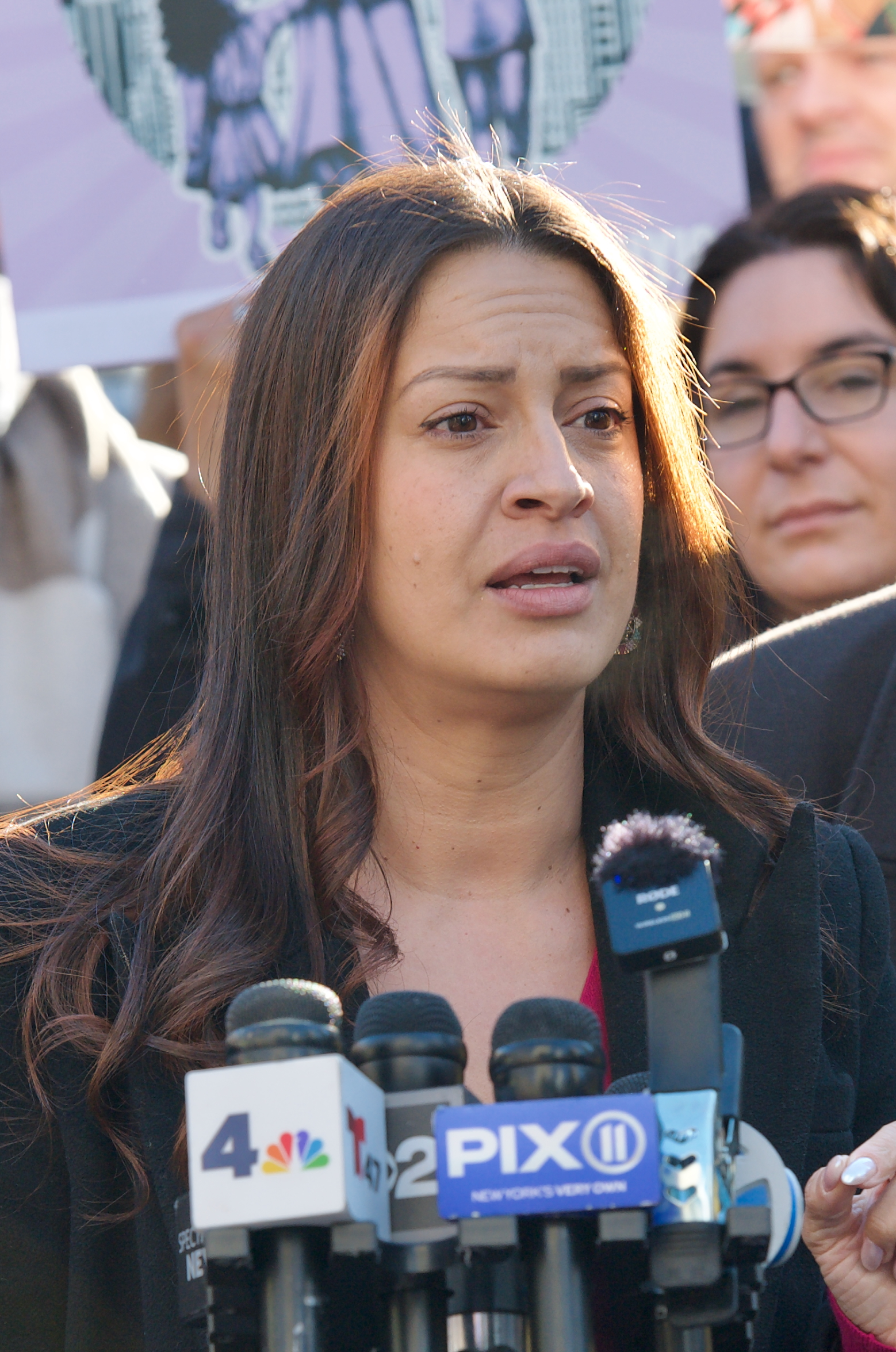
- Cruz in 2026

Member of the New York State Assembly from the 39th district
- Incumbent
- Assumed office January 1, 2019
- Preceded by: Ari Espinal

Personal details
- Born: 1982 or 1983 (age 43–44) Medellín, Colombia
- Party: Democratic
- Education: City University of New York, John Jay (BS); City University of New York, Long Island City (JD)
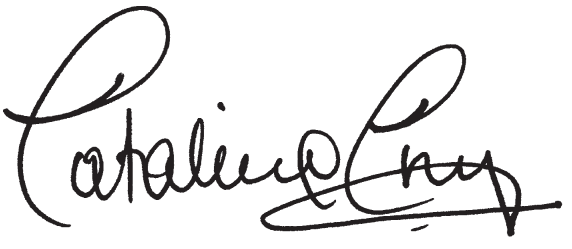
- Signature
- Website: NYS Assembly website

Catalina Cruz (born c. 1982/1983) is a Colombian-American attorney and politician. She has served as a member of the New York State Assembly since 2019 representing the 39th district, which encompasses Corona, Elmhurst, and Jackson Heights, Queens. A member of the Democratic Party and former undocumented immigrant minor (DREAMer), Cruz has worked as an advocate for immigration rights, previously serving as the director of then-Governor Andrew Cuomo's 2016 Exploited Task Force.

== Early life and education ==
Cruz was born in Medellín, Colombia. In 1992, when she was nine years old, Cruz and her mother came to the United States under a six-month tourist visa. They remained in the U.S. and she was undocumented for over 10 years after her initial tourist visa expired. Cruz grew up in Brooklyn and Queens. She has five siblings, three of whom are U.S. citizens. Cruz became the first former undocumented immigrant who identifies as a DREAMer to be elected in New York state. (Both Adriano Espaillat and Gabriela Rosa were former undocumented immigrants who served in the New York State legislature, but neither identifies as a DREAMer.) She is also the first Colombian-American in the district, and only the third DREAMer to serve in an elected position in the United States. In 2001, Cruz graduated from John Bowne High School in Flushing, Queens.

In 2005, Cruz received a bachelor's degree with honors in forensic psychology from the John Jay College of Criminal Justice. In 2009, Cruz received a J.D. from the City University of New York School of Law.

== Career ==
After law school Cruz worked as a Volunteer Assistant Attorney General for the New York State Attorney General, Andrew Cuomo, where her case work included focusing on fraud related to immigration services and working on prosecution efforts.

From 2009 to 2012, Cruz was counsel at the Goddard Riverside SRO Law Project at the Goddard Riverside Community Center on the Upper West Side of Manhattan.

From 2012 to 2014, Cruz was counsel to the Division of Immigrant Policies and Affairs at the New York State Department of Labor.

In 2014, Cruz was counsel to the Immigration Committee for the New York City Council, where she worked to improve coverage of issue related to domestic worker trafficking. She worked on the Unaccompanied Minors Initiative and the IDNYC program. She also oversaw the Key to the City program. She was in this position until 2015.

From 2015 to 2017, Cruz was the Director of the Office of the New York State Governor, Andrew Cuomo. During this time she was the Special Assistant for Labor & Workforce. She was also the Director of the Joint Task Force on Worker Exploitation and Employee Misclassification, also known as the Exploited Workers Task Force, a working as assistant counsel in Cuomo's taskforce.

In 2017, Cruz became Chief of Staff for New York City Council Member, Julissa Ferreras-Copeland until Ferreras-Copeland made the decision not to seek re-election.

== New York Assembly ==
In February 2018, Cruz announced her candidacy for Francisco Moya's vacated position on the New York State Assembly's Assembly District 39. The District's Democratic leadership instead unanimously selected Ari Espinal as the Democratic candidate in the April 2018 special election.

Cruz then won the Democratic primary for District 39 on September 13, 2018, over Espinal, and won the seat on November 6, 2018. She had received campaign training from New American Leaders that she believes helped her ultimately fundraise nearly $200,000 to win the primary race.

== Personal life ==
Cruz identifies as a DREAMer under the unadopted DREAM Act that was introduced in 2001, which addresses citizenship of children brought to the United States by their parents and living as undocumented citizens.

Cruz married her high school boyfriend in 2003, which allowed Cruz to get her green card in 2005 and become a U.S. citizen in 2009. Cruz' citizenship allowed her to sponsor her mother's citizenship. Cruz's former husband was a New York Police Department police officer. The marriage ended in divorce.

She lives in Jackson Heights, Queens.

Cruz has said that the attorney who handled her immigration papers inspired her to go to law school and become a lawyer.
