= Donald R. Miller =

American politician

Member of the New York State Assembly from the 121st district
- In office January 1, 2011 – December 31, 2012
- Preceded by: Albert A. Stirpe, Jr.
- Succeeded by: Albert A. Stirpe, Jr.

Personal details
- Born: January 11, 1966 (age 60) Syracuse, New York, U.S.
- Party: Republican
- Education: University at Buffalo (B.A.); Lee University (M.A.); Liberty University(M.A.)
- Profession: Teacher, politician, businessman, clergy

Donald R. "Don" Miller (born January 11, 1966) is a former Republican member of the New York State Assembly, representing the 121st Assembly District, which encompasses Cicero, Clay, Manlius, Pompey, and Lafayette. He was elected November 2, 2010, after defeating incumbent assemblyman Al Stirpe. He was defeated in the 2012 rematch with Al Stirpe (D, North Syracuse) in one of the most expensive and hotly contested races in New York State.

Miller was raised in Liverpool, New York, and is a graduate of Liverpool High School. He earned a B.A. in political science from the University at Buffalo, The State University of New York in 1988, an M.A. in Teaching from Lee University in 2005, an M.A. Enhancement in Education Leadership also from Lee University in 2007, and an M.A. in Theological Studies from Liberty University in 2019. His career includes business owner, teacher, school Principal, politician, and ordained minister of the Christian faith. Miller and his wife Tracy, a naturalized citizen, were married in 2006 and have two children.

Miller has been active in politics, business, education, and Christian missions since 1985. Early in his career Miller was a partner in a political consulting firm representing candidates at the local, state, and federal levels. The firm specialized in supporting conservative Republican candidates in challenges to more moderate incumbent Republican office holders, and performed fund raising and public relations services for a number of specific issues and public individuals. During this time Miller served as New York Youth chairman for Congressman Jack Kemp's 1988 Republican primary campaign for President of the United States, and served for a time on Kemp's staff at the Department of Housing and Urban Development. Miller also worked on Capitol Hill for Representative Jim Nussle of Iowa, a member of the Gang of Seven House Members who pressed the House Banking scandal, also known as the Congressional Check Bouncing scandal, in a drive to reform Congressional rules on ethics. During the 1992 Presidential campaign, believing the conservative wing of the Republican Party could be over-run by Ku Klux Klan leader David Duke, Miller delivered key political and fund raising support for the insurgent Presidential candidacy of former Reagan speech writer Patrick Buchanan, which quickly ended Duke's campaign and influence.

In the New York State Assembly, Miller served on the Committees on Labor, Corporations, Banks, Aging, and Cities, and was the Ranking Republican Member on the Committee on Consumer Affairs and Protection. An uncompromising conservative on fiscal and social matters, Miller supported and the Legislature passed a $1.8 billion income tax cut, agriculture tax cuts, and a 12% cut in state government spending. He cast 85 votes against tax increases, and supported funding for education, prescription drug coverage, and employment tax credits. Miller sponsored legislation for a cap on state property taxes at 0% annual growth, a 0% state tax on income from capital gains, a 0% state tax on estate transfers, and a 0% state tax on corporate profits. He also sponsored legislation to eliminate unfunded state-mandated spending through local government levy, and to limit Members' terms of service. Miller challenged state taxes on cell phones, health insurance, auto insurance, gasoline, and day care services as unbalanced burdens on families at the lowest end of the income scale. Miller consistently voted against budget and spending bills he viewed as political, frequently asserting that business grants and economic development funds were part of the political funding mechanism incumbents of both parties used to retain control of their positions in State government. Miller voted against the State's same-sex marriage bill, arguing that the Biblical parameters for marriage are not subject to modification by the state. Miller was twice recognized as the most independent Member of the State Legislature by the left-leaning New York Public Interest Research Group, and was also recognized as the most conservative Member by the New York State Conservative Party, ideologically and practically positioning him to challenge the ideas and the unchecked powers of Albany's Democratic Majority and the moderate Republican minority.

From 1997 through 2005 Miller taught English to Chinese university students, and from 2000 through 2005 he was an unofficial advisor to senior leaders in the People's Republic of China. He filled the role of Quality Manager for a medical manufacturer from 2006 through 2011. From 2014 through 2019 he was the lead Academic administrator for two start-up American curriculum K-12 international schools in China. Miller and his family returned to central New York in 2019. Miller currently serves as an elected Member of the School Board in the Baldwinsville school district.

New York State Assembly
Preceded by Al Stirpe	New York State Assembly, 121st District; January 1, 2011 – December 31, 2013	Succeeded by Al Stirpe
