= Charles D. Lavine =

American politician

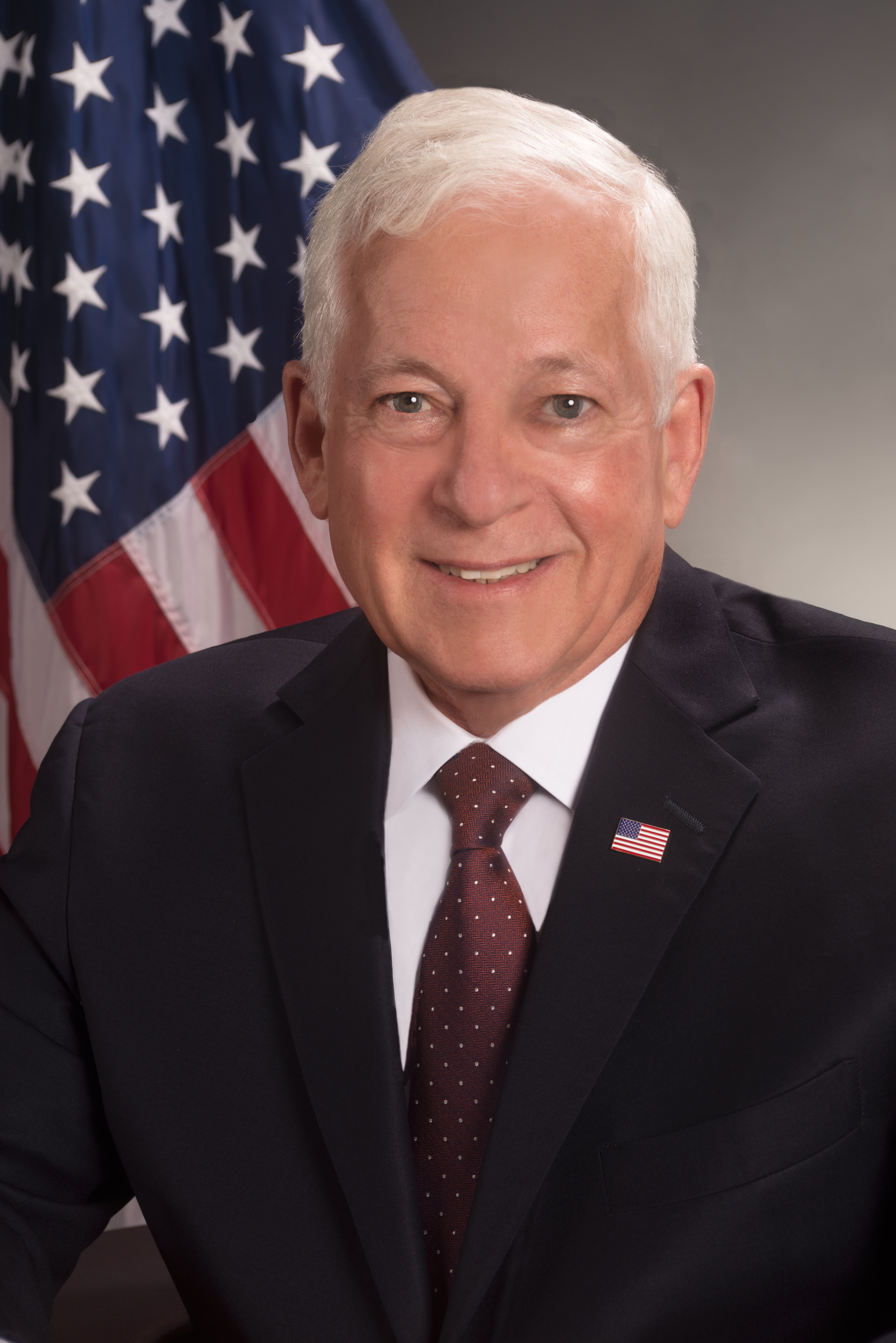

Member of the New York State Assembly from the 13th district
- Incumbent
- Assumed office January 1, 2005
- Preceded by: David Sidikman

Personal details
- Born: Charles David Lavine; August 14, 1947 (age 79) Marinette, Wisconsin, U.S.
- Party: Democratic
- Spouse: Ronnie
- Children: Two: Gregory, Andria
- Education: University of Wisconsin; New York Law School
- Profession: Lawyer
- Website: Official website

Charles D. Lavine (born August 14, 1947) is a member of the New York State Assembly, representing the 13th district, which includes portions of the towns of North Hempstead and Oyster Bay in Nassau County. First elected in 2004, Lavine is a Democrat.

== Early life and education ==
Lavine was born in Marinette, Wisconsin. He graduated from Marinette High School in 1965 and received a B.A. degree in English Literature from the University of Wisconsin–Madison in 1969. After coming to New York, he earned a J.D. from New York Law School in June 1972.

Lavine has been a Glen Cove resident since 1980. He and his wife Ronnie have two children, Gregory and Andria.

== Career ==
From 1972 to 1976 worked as a staff attorney for the Legal Aid Society of New York. From 1977 to 1995 he served as a partner in the law firm of Grossman, Lavine & Rinaldo in Forest Hills, New York. Since 1996, he has been a sole practitioner specializing in criminal defense work.

In 2000 Nassau County Executive and Glen Cove Mayor Thomas Suozzi appointed Lavine to the Glen Cove Planning Board. In May 2003 Lavine was appointed to fill a vacancy on the Glen Cove City Council, a position to which he was subsequently elected. In 2004 he successfully ran in the Democratic Party primary election for an Assembly seat against six-term incumbent David S. Sidikman and later that year won the seat at the general election, taking office in 2005.

In 2016 Lavine had announced that he would run for Nassau County Executive in 2017, saying he would want to weed out corruption and strengthen government ethics in Nassau as he has sought to do in the state Legislature. In May 2017, Lavine dropped out of the race for Country Executive and endorsed Laura Curran for the position.

In January 2021, Assembly Speaker Carl E. Heastie appointed Assemblymember Lavine as Chair of the Judiciary Committee. Lavine is also a member of the Committee on Codes, Ethics and Guidance, Rules and Insurance. Lavine previously served as Chair of the Election Law Committee, Chair of the Committee on Ethics and Guidance, co-Chair of the New York State Legislative Ethics Commission and as Chair of the bipartisan Taskforce that produced the Assembly Speaker's Policy on Sexual Harassment, Retaliation and Discrimination. Lavine also serves as President of the New York Chapter of the National Association of Jewish Legislators and as a member of its national board of directors.

== Legislation and policy positions ==
As chair of the Committee on Ethics, Lavine led the investigation into former Assemblyman Vito Lopez for sexual harassment of female staffers, eventually imposing a $330,000 fine in 2013.

Lavine voted on March 11, 2014, to re-appoint three members (James Cottrell, Wade Norwood, and Christine Cea) to the Board of Regents, the body responsible for overseeing state education policy and implementation of the Common Core State Standards Initiative.

In 2009, he was one of 17 Democrats to cosponsor A8180, which increased several transportation-related fees to fund the operation of the Metropolitan Transportation Authority (including rental car fees, DMV fees and the MTA fee on self-employed workers).

Lavine supports LGBT rights including same-sex marriage as well as opposing gender discrimination. In 2009, he sponsored A7732 that would allow "same-sex couples the same opportunity to enter into civil marriages as opposite-sex couples". Lavine sponsored A5710, a bill that would prohibit "discrimination based on gender identity or expression." In 2011, Lavine renewed his support for this legislation.

In 2011, Lavine supported an extension of the temporary New York State income tax surcharge on individuals earning over $200,000 annually. This temporary surcharge was enacted in January 2009 to balance the New York State budget.

== Election results ==
2022 New York State Assembly General Election
Party	Candidate	Votes	%
Democratic	Charles Lavine (Incumbent)	22,111	54.4%
Republican	Ruka Anzai	18,504	45.5%
Total votes		40,640	100%

2020 New York State Assembly General Election
Party	Candidate	Votes	%
Democratic	Charles Lavine (Incumbent)	39,446	63.15%
Republican	Andrew Monteleone	23,015	36.85%
Total votes		68,288	100%

2018 New York State Assembly General Election
Party	Candidate	Votes	%
Democratic	Charles Lavine (Incumbent)	31,602	68.08%
Republican	Andrew Monteleone	14,804	31.89%
Total votes		46,420	100%

2016 New York State Assembly General Election
Party	Candidate	Votes	%
Democratic	Charles Lavine (Incumbent)	31,860	62.42%
Republican	Jeffery S. Vitale	18,570	36.38%
Total votes		27,949	100

2014 New York State Assembly General Election
Party	Candidate	Votes	%
Democratic	Charles Lavine (Incumbent)	17,687	60.2%
Republican	Louis Imbroto	11,290	38.4%
Green	Jeffery J. Peress	389	1.3%

2012 New York State Assembly General Election
Party	Candidate	Votes	%
Democratic	Charles Lavine (Incumbent)	29,089	63.3%
Republican	Louis Imbroto	16,470	35.8%
Green	Jeffery J. Peress	395	.9%
Total votes		45,954	100%

2010 New York State Assembly General Election
Party	Candidate	Votes	%
Democratic	Charles Lavine (Incumbent)	21,594	55.9%
Republican	Robert Germino	16,996	44.1%
Total votes		38,590	100%

2008 New York State Assembly General Election
Party	Candidate	Votes	%
Democratic	Charles Lavine (Incumbent)	35,960	65.2%
Republican	George McMenamin	19,118	34.8%
Total votes		55,078	100%

2006 New York State Assembly General Election
Party	Candidate	Votes	%
Democratic	Charles Lavine (Incumbent)	24,160	59.9%
Republican	Steve Gonzalez	12,600	31.2%

2004 New York State Assembly General Election
Party	Candidate	Votes	%
Democratic	Charles Lavine	33,345	51.5%
Republican	Phillip Sciarillo Sr.	18,735	28.9%
Independence	David Sidikman (Incumbent)	4,237	6.06%
Total votes		64,652	100%

2004 New York State Assembly Primary Election
Party	Candidate	Votes	%
Democratic	Charles Lavine	3,507	52%
Democratic	David Sidikman (Incumbent)	3,216	48%
Total votes		6,723	100%

New York State Assembly
Preceded by David Sidikman	New York State Assembly, 13th District; 2005–present	Incumbent
