= Albert A. Stirpe Jr. =

American politician

Al Stirpe

Member of the New York State Assembly from the 127th district
- Incumbent
- Assumed office January 1, 2013
- Preceded by: Donald R. Miller
- In office January 1, 2007 – December 31, 2010
- Preceded by: Jeffrey Brown
- Succeeded by: Donald R. Miller

Personal details
- Born: June 16, 1953 (age 73) Lyons, New York, U.S.
- Party: Democratic
- Spouse: Chele Stirpe
- Children: 3
- Education: University of Notre Dame
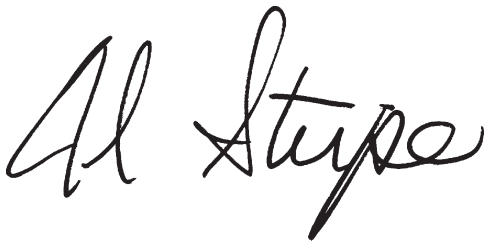
- Signature
- Website: Official assembly website

Albert A. Stirpe Jr. (born June 16, 1953) is a politician who serves as a member of the New York State Assembly representing the 127th Assembly district first elected in 2006. He is a Democrat. Stirpe's district comprises the towns of Cicero, Clay, Manlius, Pompey and Tully in Onondaga County, Central New York.

== Biography ==
Stirpe was born and raised in Clyde, New York where his family owned and operated Albert's Restaurant for more than 26 years. After graduating from high school with honors in 1971, he attended the University of Notre Dame and graduated in 1975 with a degree in economics. At Notre Dame, Stirpe was a place kicker and punter on the football team. He lives in Cicero with his wife, Chele, and their daughter, Alexandra. He is involved with Casey's Place in Syracuse, NY.

== New York Assembly ==
Stirpe ran for the New York Assembly in 2006 when his Republican predecessor decided to run for the 49th District Senate seat against the incumbent. Though he was not the Onondaga County Democrats designated candidate, he won the September primary and went on to win the seat in November. His Republican opponent was William Meyer of Cicero, NY.

Al Stirpe was opposed by Republican David Knapp in 2008, but won reelection in what was one of the most hotly contested races in New York State - 59% to Knapp's 41%. In 2010, Stirpe lost to Don Miller by 953 votes.

In a hotly contested rematch in 2012, costing over $800,000, Stirpe won the election with almost 6,000 more votes than Miller according to unofficial results. Stirpe carried Manlius, Cicero (his hometown) and Clay (Miller's home town). Miller carried Tully, Pompey and Fabius. This was the most expensive state assembly race in this election year. In another hotly contested election in 2014, Stirpe won the election with over 2,000 more votes than his opponent, Rob DeMarco.

The 2020 campaign was unique in the large number of absentee ballots cast, with Stirpe initially behind in the vote count, but he pulled ahead when absentee votes were counted. Stirpe then went on to declare victory on December 1, 2020, after an extended time for counting ballots.

New York State Assembly
Preceded by Jeffrey Brown	New York State Assembly, 121st District; 2007–2010	Succeeded by Don Miller
Preceded by Don Miller	New York State Assembly, 127th District; 2013–present	Incumbent
