= New York's 6th State Assembly district =

American legislative district

Assemblymember
| Philip Ramos; D–Brentwood |

New York's 6th State Assembly district is one of the 150 districts in the New York State Assembly. It has been represented by Democrat Philip Ramos since 2003.

== Geography ==
=== 2020s ===
District 6 is in Suffolk County, and includes portions of the town of Islip. Most of the hamlets of North Bay Shore, Central Islip and East Brentwood lie within the district, as well as portions of Brentwood.

The district is entirely within New York's 2nd congressional district, and the 4th and 8th districts of the New York State Senate.

=== 2010s ===
District 6 is in Suffolk County. It contains portions of the town of Islip, including Bay Shore, Brentwood, Central Islip and Islandia.

== Recent election results ==
=== 2026 ===
2026 New York State Assembly election, District 6
| Party | Candidate | Votes | % |
|---|---|---|---|
| Democratic | Philip Ramos | | |
| Working Families | Philip Ramos | | |
| Total | Philip Ramos (incumbent) | | |
| Republican | Dennis Barravecchio | | |
| Conservative | Dennis Barravecchio | | |
| Total | Dennis Barravecchio | | |
| Write-in | | | |
| Total votes | | | |

=== 2024 ===
2024 New York State Assembly election, District 6
| Party | Candidate | Votes | % |
|---|---|---|---|
| Democratic | Philip Ramos | 20,464 | |
| Working Families | Philip Ramos | 1,575 | |
| Total | Philip Ramos (incumbent) | 22,039 | 65.7 |
| Republican | Daniel Mitola | 11,483 | 34.2 |
| Write-in | | 16 | 0.1 |
| Total votes | | 33,538 | 100.0 |
| Democratic hold | | | |

=== 2022 ===
2022 New York State Assembly election, District 6
| Party | Candidate | Votes | % |
|---|---|---|---|
| Democratic | Philip Ramos (incumbent) | 12,241 | 59.9 |
| Republican | Kevin Surdi | 7,071 | |
| Conservative | Kevin Surdi | 1,134 | |
| Total | Kevin Surdi | 8,205 | 40.1 |
| Write-in | | 5 | 0.0 |
| Total votes | | 20,451 | 100.0 |
| Democratic hold | | | |

=== 2020 ===
2020 New York State Assembly election, District 6
| Party | Candidate | Votes | % |
|---|---|---|---|
| Democratic | Philip Ramos | 25,223 | |
| Working Families | Philip Ramos | 1,155 | |
| Independence | Philip Ramos | 431 | |
| Total | Philip Ramos (incumbent) | 26,809 | 58.3 |
| Republican | Ryan Skelly | 7,501 | |
| Conservative | Ryan Skelly | 1,024 | |
| Total | Ryan Skelly | 8,525 | 41.7 |
| Write-in | | 11 | 0.0 |
| Total votes | | 35,345 | 100.0 |
| Democratic hold | | | |

=== 2018 ===
2018 New York State Assembly election, District 6
| Party | Candidate | Votes | % |
|---|---|---|---|
| Democratic | Philip Ramos | 20,027 | |
| Working Families | Philip Ramos | 732 | |
| Independence | Philip Ramos | 516 | |
| Women's Equality | Philip Ramos | 188 | |
| Reform | Philip Ramos | 109 | |
| Total | Philip Ramos (incumbent) | 21,572 | 99.6 |
| Write-in | | 83 | 0.4 |
| Total votes | | 21,655 | 100.0 |
| Democratic hold | | | |

=== 2016 ===
2016 New York State Assembly election, District 6
Primary election
| Party | Candidate | Votes | % |
|---|---|---|---|
| Democratic | Philip Ramos (incumbent) | 2,012 | 73.0 |
| Democratic | Giovanni Mata | 746 | 27.0 |
| Write-in | | 0 | 0.0 |
| Total votes | | 2,758 | 100 |
General election
| Democratic | Philip Ramos | 24,201 | |
| Working Families | Philip Ramos | 1,573 | |
| Independence | Philip Ramos | 1,046 | |
| Total | Philip Ramos (incumbent) | 26,820 | 99.7 |
| Write-in | | 89 | 0.3 |
| Total votes | | 26,909 | 100.0 |
| Democratic hold | | | |

=== 2014 ===
2014 New York State Assembly election, District 6
| Party | Candidate | Votes | % |
|---|---|---|---|
| Democratic | Philip Ramos | 8,626 | |
| Working Families | Philip Ramos | 479 | |
| Independence | Philip Ramos | 332 | |
| Total | Philip Ramos (incumbent) | 9,437 | 68.6 |
| Republican | Victoria Serpa | 3,367 | |
| Conservative | Victoria Serpa | 641 | |
| United Communities | Victoria Serpa | 124 | |
| Total | Victoria Serpa | 4,332 | 31.4 |
| Write-in | | 8 | 0.0 |
| Total votes | | 13,775 | 100.0 |
| Democratic hold | | | |

=== 2012 ===
2012 New York State Assembly election, District 6
Primary election
| Party | Candidate | Votes | % |
|---|---|---|---|
| Democratic | Philip Ramos (incumbent) | 1,476 | 78.3 |
| Democratic | Samuel Gonzalez | 409 | 21.7 |
| Write-in | | 0 | 0.0 |
| Total votes | | 1,885 | 100 |
General election
| Democratic | Philip Ramos | 21,135 | |
| Working Families | Philip Ramos | 1,033 | |
| Independence | Philip Ramos | 455 | |
| Total | Philip Ramos (incumbent) | 22,623 | 80.8 |
| Republican | Manuel Troche | 4,387 | |
| Conservative | Manuel Troche | 988 | |
| Total | Manuel Troche | 5,375 | 19.2 |
| Write-in | | 7 | 0.0 |
| Total votes | | 28,005 | 100.0 |
| Democratic hold | | | |
