= Philip Ramos =

American politician (born 1956)

Phil Ramos
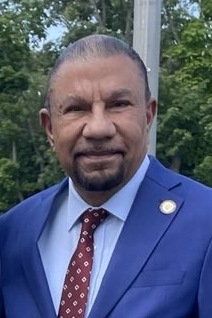
- Ramos in 2024

Deputy Speaker of the New York State Assembly
- Incumbent
- Assumed office January 4, 2023
- Speaker: Carl Heastie
- Preceded by: Catherine Nolan
- In office January 7, 2015 – December 31, 2020
- Speaker: Carl Heastie
- Preceded by: N. Nick Perry
- Succeeded by: Michaelle C. Solages

Member of the New York State Assembly from the 6th district
- Incumbent
- Assumed office January 1, 2003
- Preceded by: Robert Wertz

Personal details
- Born: April 6, 1956 (age 70) The Bronx, New York, U.S.
- Party: Democratic
- Children: 2
- Website: assembly.state.ny.us/mem/?ad=006

Philip Ramos (born April 6, 1956) is an American politician currently representing the 6th District, including portions of Islip, Bay Shore, Brentwood, Central Islip and Islandia in Suffolk County on Long Island, in the New York Assembly. He is a Democrat.

== Biography ==
Ramos is the son of a correction officer and a registered nurse. He graduated from Brentwood High School in 1974, and went to work as a therapy aide at the Pilgrim Psychiatric Center. He later became an emergency medical technician and a Suffolk County police officer. He worked eight years in the narcotics unit as an undercover officer. He was promoted to detective in 1987 and retired in 1999.

In 2002, Ramos opted to run for the New York Assembly to succeed Republican Robert Wertz, who was retiring after thirty years to seek a seat in the New York Senate. In a close race, he defeated Republican Philip Goglas 53% to 47%.

Ramos currently sits on the Labor, Local Governments, Ways and Means, Aging, and Education committees.

New York State Assembly
| Preceded by Robert Wertz | Member of the New York Assembly from the 6th District; 2003–present | Incumbent |
| Preceded by Nick Perry | Deputy Speaker of the New York Assembly; 2015–2020 | Succeeded by Michaelle C. Solages |
| Preceded by Catherine Nolan | Deputy Speaker of the New York Assembly; 2023–present | Incumbent |
