= Kenneth Zebrowski Jr. =

American politician (born 1980)

Kenneth Paul Zebrowski
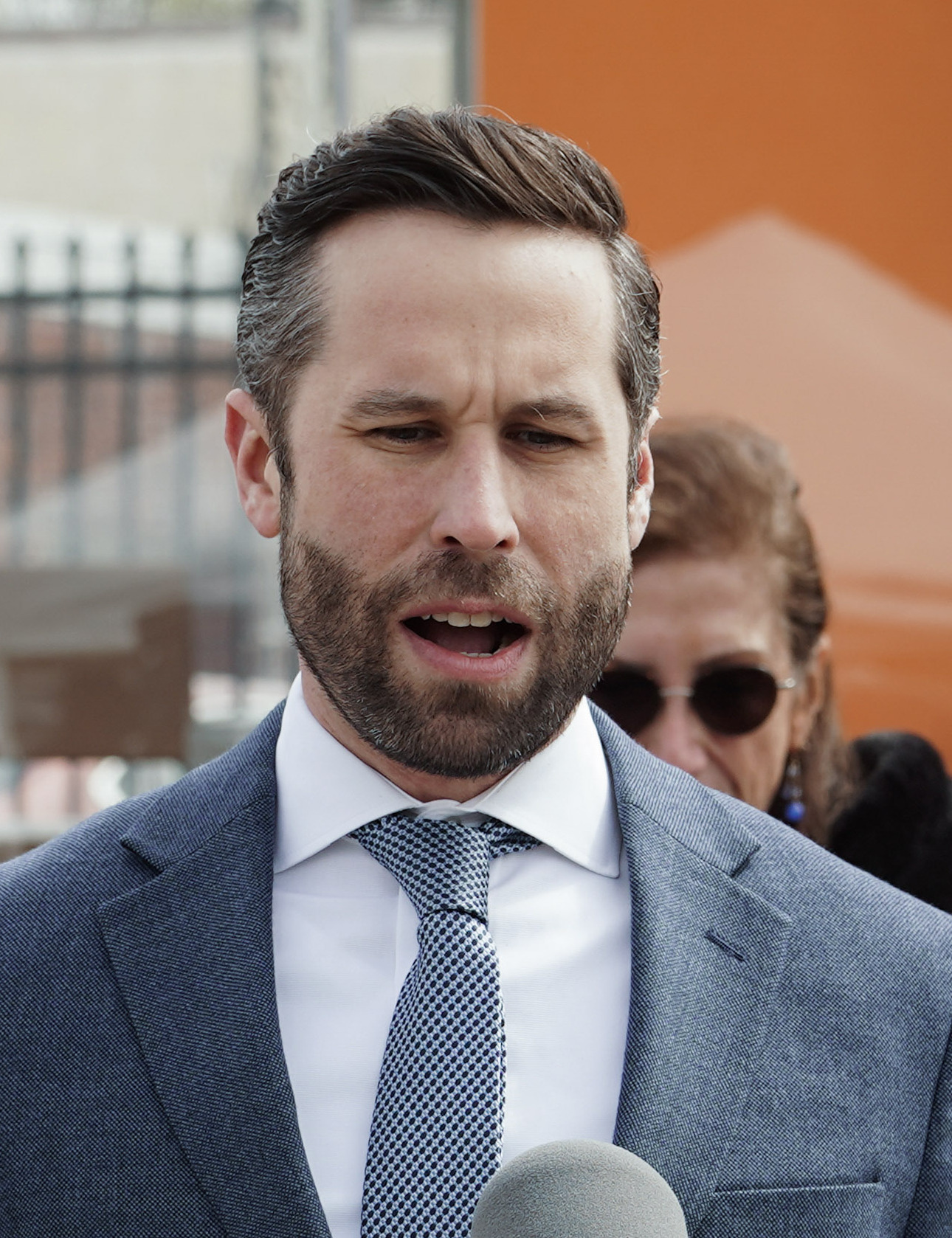

Member of the New York Assembly
- In office May 3, 2007 – July 10, 2024
- Preceded by: Kenneth Peter Zebrowski
- Succeeded by: Patrick Carroll
- Constituency: 94th district (2007–2012); 96th district (2013–2024)

Personal details
- Born: November 20, 1980 (age 45) Suffern, New York, U.S.
- Party: Democratic
- Education: SUNY Albany; Seton Hall University School of Law
- Profession: lawyer, politician
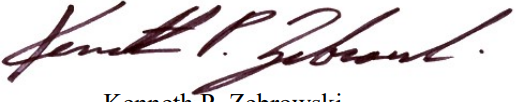
- Signature
- Website: Official website

Kenneth Paul Zebrowski (born November 20, 1980) is an American politician who served as a Democratic member of the New York State Assembly. In 2020, he was re-elected to represent the 96th district of New York, which includes the communities of Clarkstown, Haverstraw, and portions of the town of Ramapo. Prior to his election to the assembly, Zebrowski served in the Rockland County Legislature.

== Education and law career ==
Zebrowski graduated from Clarkstown Schools before receiving his Bachelor of Arts degree (Magna cum Laude) in political science from the State University of New York at Albany and his Juris Doctor degree from the Seton Hall University School of Law.

Upon his graduation from law school, Zebrowski founded the firm of Zebrowski & Zebrowski with his father, the late Assemblyman Kenneth Peter Zebrowski. Currently he is "of counsel" to the firm Braunfotel & Frendel in New City, New York.

== Political career ==
In 2005, Zebrowski served in the Rockland County Legislature.

On May 1, 2007, he won a special election to fill the State Assembly seat of his late father. He ran uncontested in the 2008 general election and won the 2010 general election with 58 percent of the vote.

In 2019, Zebrowski ran for Rockland County District Attorney. He finished in second-place in the Democratic Primary with 25% of the vote, behind former state Supreme Court judge Thomas Walsh, who won 52% of the vote.

On July 10, 2024, Zebrowski resigned his elected position in the New York State Assembly; he had previously announced that he would forgo reelection.

== Personal life ==
Zebrowski is a former board member of the Camp Venture Foundation, Loeb House/Josephs Home, and Rockland County Big Brothers Big Sisters. He has also volunteered as a girls' softball coach and for events sponsored by Keep Rockland Beautiful.

== Election results ==
- May 2007 special election, NYS Assembly, 94th AD

Kenneth P. Zebrowski (DEM - IND - CON - WOR)	...	3,913
Matthew Brennan (REP)	...	1,268

- November 2008 general election, NYS Assembly, 94th AD

Kenneth P. Zebrowski (DEM - IND - CON - WOR)	...	43,227

- November 2010 general election, NYS Assembly, 94th AD

Kenneth P. Zebrowski (DEM - IND)	...	22,645
Frank P. Sparaco (REP - CON - WOR)	...	16,750

- November 2012 general election, NYS Assembly, 96th AD

Kenneth P. Zebrowski (DEM - IND)	...	41,526

September 2014 primary election
Kenneth P. Zebrowski	4,082
P.T. Thomas	1,329

- November 2014 general election, NYS Assembly, 96th AD

Kenneth P. Zebrowski (DEM - IND)	...	20,534
Matthew I. Brennan (REP)	...	11,026

New York State Assembly
Preceded by Kenneth Zebrowski	New York State Assembly, 94th District; 2007–2024	Vacant
