= Lakeview, New York =

- Hamlet and Census-designated place
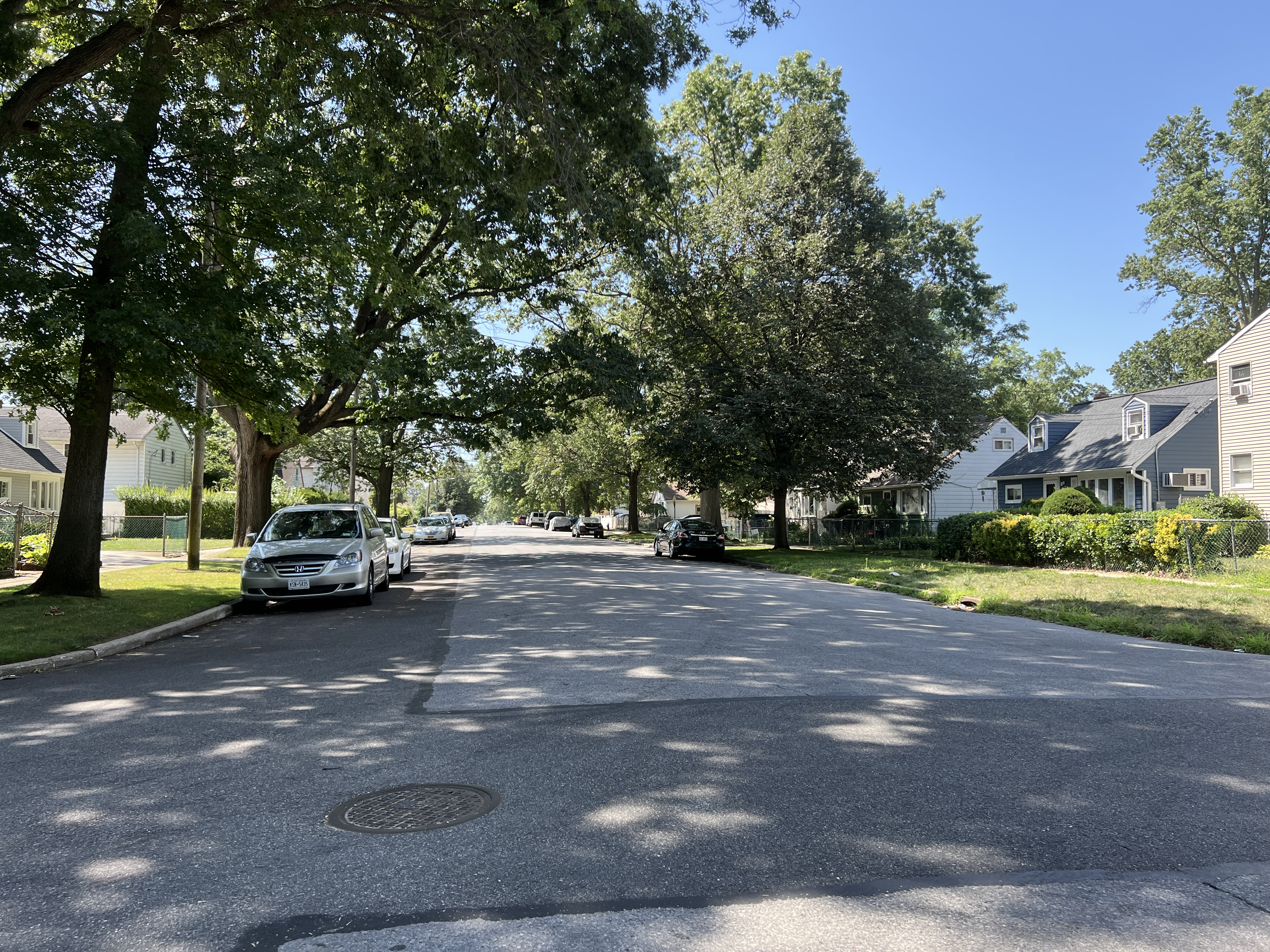
- Langdon Boulevard in Lakeview on August 8, 2022.

- Location in Nassau County and the state of New York

- Location within the state of New York Lakeview, New York (New York) Lakeview, New York (the United States)
- Coordinates: 40°40′30″N 73°39′16″W
- Country: United States
- State: New York
- County: Nassau County, New York
- Town: Hempstead
- Named for: Its proximity to Hempstead Lake

Area
  - Total: 1.20 sq mi (3.10 km^{2})
  - Land: 1.00 sq mi (2.59 km^{2})
  - Water: 0.20 sq mi (0.51 km^{2})
- Elevation: 39 ft (12 m)

Population (2020)
  - Total: 6,077
  - Density: 6,072.4/sq mi (2,344.56/km^{2})
- Time zone: UTC-5 (Eastern (EST))
  - Summer (DST): UTC-4 (EDT)
- ZIP Codes: 11552 (West Hempstead); 11570 (Rockville Centre)
- Area code: 516
- FIPS code: 36-41003
- GNIS feature ID: 0954975

Lakeview is a hamlet and census-designated place (CDP) in the Town of Hempstead in Nassau County, on Long Island, in New York, United States. The population was 6,077 at the 2020 census.

The Lakeview Fire Department (also referred to as Lakeview FD and abbreviated as LVFD) is the main provider of Fire Protection and Emergency Medical Services within Lakeview.

== History ==
Lakeview's name reflects upon its proximity to Hempstead Lake at Hempstead Lake State Park.

== Geography ==
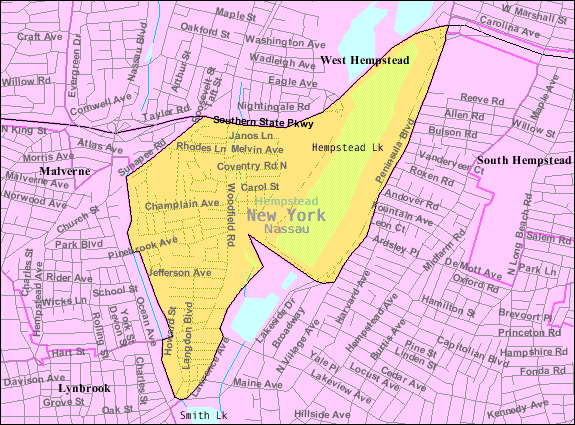
U.S. Census map of Lakeview.

According to the United States Census Bureau, the CDP has a total area of 1.2 square miles (3.1 km^{2}), of which 1.0 square mile (2.6 km^{2}) is land and 0.2 square miles (0.52 km^{2}) (17.95%) is water.

== Demographics ==
Historical population
| Census | Pop. | Note | %± |
|---|---|---|---|
| 2000 | 5,607 | | — |
| 2010 | 5,615 | | 0.1% |
| 2020 | 6,077 | | 8.2% |
U.S. Decennial Census; 2010 2020

=== Racial and ethnic composition ===
Lakeview CDP, New York – Racial and ethnic composition Note: the US Census treats Hispanic/Latino as an ethnic category. This table excludes Latinos from the racial categories and assigns them to a separate category. Hispanics/Latinos may be of any race.
| Race / Ethnicity (NH = Non-Hispanic) | Pop 2000 | Pop 2010 | Pop 2020 | % 2000 | % 2010 | % 2020 |
|---|---|---|---|---|---|---|
| White alone (NH) | 290 | 128 | 152 | 5.17% | 2.28% | 2.50% |
| Black or African American alone (NH) | 4,674 | 4,399 | 4,249 | 83.36% | 78.34% | 69.92% |
| Native American or Alaska Native alone (NH) | 13 | 30 | 17 | 0.23% | 0.53% | 0.28% |
| Asian alone (NH) | 27 | 44 | 157 | 0.48% | 0.78% | 2.58% |
| Native Hawaiian or Pacific Islander alone (NH) | 0 | 1 | 0 | 0.00% | 0.02% | 0.00% |
| Other race alone (NH) | 41 | 20 | 126 | 0.73% | 0.36% | 2.07% |
| Mixed race or Multiracial (NH) | 173 | 140 | 253 | 3.09% | 2.49% | 4.16% |
| Hispanic or Latino (any race) | 389 | 853 | 1,123 | 6.94% | 15.19% | 18.48% |
| Total | 5,607 | 5,615 | 6,077 | 100.00% | 100.00% | 100.00% |

=== 2020 census ===
As of the 2020 census, Lakeview had a population of 6,077. The median age was 38.4 years. 22.1% of residents were under the age of 18 and 14.9% of residents were 65 years of age or older. For every 100 females there were 88.0 males, and for every 100 females age 18 and over there were 83.6 males age 18 and over.

100.0% of residents lived in urban areas, while 0.0% lived in rural areas.

There were 1,567 households in Lakeview, of which 44.5% had children under the age of 18 living in them. Of all households, 48.8% were married-couple households, 13.3% were households with a male householder and no spouse or partner present, and 32.8% were households with a female householder and no spouse or partner present. About 12.0% of all households were made up of individuals and 5.0% had someone living alone who was 65 years of age or older.

There were 1,625 housing units, of which 3.6% were vacant. The homeowner vacancy rate was 1.3% and the rental vacancy rate was 3.0%.

=== 2000 census ===
At the 2000 census there were 5,607 people, 1,525 households, and 1,287 families in the CDP. The population density was 5,850.2 inhabitants per square mile (2,258.8/km^{2}). There were 1,569 housing units at an average density of 1,637.1 per square mile (632.1/km^{2}). The racial makeup of the CDP was 6.90% White, 84.95% African American, 0.32% Native American, 0.48% Asian, 3.44% from other races, and 3.91% from two or more races. Hispanic or Latino of any race were 6.94%.

Of the 1,525 households 37.8% had children under the age of 18 living with them, 51.6% were married couples living together, 26.5% had a female householder with no husband present, and 15.6% were non-families. 11.3% of households were one person and 5.5% were one person aged 65 or older. The average household size was 3.59 and the average family size was 3.81.

The age distribution was 28.3% under the age of 18, 8.1% from 18 to 24, 27.5% from 25 to 44, 22.6% from 45 to 64, and 13.5% 65 or older. The median age was 36 years. For every 100 females, there were 82.6 males. For every 100 females age 18 and over, there were 75.6 males.

The median household income was $98,036. The per capita income for the CDP was $28,575. About 4.9% of families and 6.3% of the population were below the poverty line, including 6.4% of those under age 18 and 7.7% of those age 65 or over.
