= Ari Espinal =

American politician (born 1988)

Member of the New York State Assembly from the 39th district
- In office April 24, 2018 – December 31, 2018
- Preceded by: Francisco Moya
- Succeeded by: Catalina Cruz

Personal details
- Born: Aridia Espinal; 1988 (age 37–38) New York City, New York, U.S.
- Party: Democratic
- Other political affiliations: Working Families Party
- Education: St. Francis College (BA)

Aridia Espinal (born 1988) is an American politician who served as a member of the New York State Assembly from April to December 2018. A Democrat, she replaced Francisco Moya, who she was an aide to, in a special election after he was elected to the New York City Council. She lost re-nomination to Catalina Cruz in the regularly scheduled primary election.

== Early life and education ==
Espinal was born in Queens, the daughter of immigrants from the Dominican Republic. Espinal received a Bachelor of Arts degree from St. Francis College.

== Career ==
Espinal worked as an aide to Assemblyman Francisco Moya. After Moya's election to the New York City Council, Espinal was nominated to run in a special election to fill the vacancy. She was elected on April 24, 2018, and took her seat in the 202nd New York State Legislature. On September 11, 2018, Espinal lost the Democratic primary to Catalina Cruz. In the general election on November 6, 2018, Espinal ran on the Working Families Party and the Women's Equality Party lines for re-election, but was again defeated by Cruz.

Following her term in the Assembly, Espinal served as New York City Political Coordinator to the Mason Tenders' District Council PAC. City & State named her #94 on its 2026 Queens Power 100 list for her work championing the Construction Justice Act, which requires developers to pay workers a minimum package of $40 per hour.

== Personal life ==
Espinal became the legal guardian of an elderly man with developmental disabilities who is almost twice her age in 2013. Espinal had met him in 2011 when his mother worked at the front desk of the building of Moya's former office; his mother died of cancer in 2013, leaving him with no relatives until Espinal legally adopted him.

New York State Assembly
Preceded by Francisco Moya	New York State Assembly; 39th District; 2018	Succeeded by Catalina Cruz
