= Marc W. Butler =

American politician (born 1952)

Member of the New York State Assembly from the 118th district
- In office November 8, 1995 – January 1, 2019
- Preceded by: Anthony Casale
- Succeeded by: Robert Smullen

Personal details
- Born: January 21, 1952 (age 74) Herkimer, New York
- Party: Republican
- Spouse: Susan
- Children: Two
- Education: SUNY Potsdam
- Profession: Politician
- Website: Official website

Marc W. Butler (born January 21, 1952) is a former Republican member of the New York State Assembly for the 118th Assembly District, which includes Herkimer County, Fulton County and the northeastern portion of Otsego County.

Butler received a Bachelor of Arts degree in English from State University of New York at Potsdam. He worked as a reporter for the Utica Observer-Dispatch from 1976 to 1986, and was a corporate communications specialist for Utica National Insurance Group from 1986 to 1995. Butler was a Newport Village Trustee and also served as Deputy Mayor of the village. He then served two terms in the Herkimer County Legislature, where he was elected Majority Leader in 1993.

He was first elected to represent 113th Assembly District in 1995. Due to redistricting, he was elected to the new 117th Assembly District in 2002. Butler won the November 2008 general election with 71 percent of the vote and ran uncontested in the November 2010 general election. He did not seek reelection in 2018.

Butler resides in the Village of Newport with his wife Susan. They have two children, Caitlin and Jeffrey.
