= Earlene Hill Hooper =

American politician

Earlene Hooper

Deputy Speaker of the New York State Assembly
- In office Jan 1, 2009 – Dec 31, 2018
- Preceded by: Ivan Lafayette
- Succeeded by: Catherine Nolan

Member of the New York State Assembly from the 18th district
- In office March 16, 1988 – December 31, 2018
- Preceded by: Barbara Patton
- Succeeded by: Taylor Raynor

Personal details
- Born: 1933 or 1934 (age 91–92) Baltimore, Maryland
- Party: Democratic
- Spouse: Thomas
- Education: Norfolk State University; Adelphi University
- Profession: social worker, politician
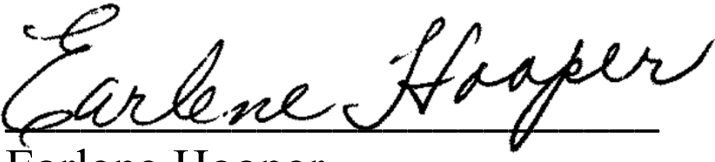
- Signature
- Website: Official website

Earlene Hill Hooper is an American politician who represented District 18 in the New York State Assembly from 1988 to 2018. Hooper's district included large portions of Nassau County. Hooper served as the first female Deputy Speaker of the Assembly from 2009 to 2018. First elected in a special election held on March 15, 1988, Hooper was (at one time) the only New York state legislator of color from Long Island.

A former social worker, with a B.A. in English from Norfolk State University and a Master's in Social Work from Adelphi University, she previously served as an administrator in New York State's Department of Social Services Division of Child and Family Services.

Hooper also served on the Democratic Platform Committee during 1988.

On September 13, 2018, Hooper was defeated in the Democratic primary by psychologist and political newcomer Taylor Raynor, who was described as "a loose jezebel that has two kids and no husband" in fliers spread within the assembly district. Hooper was criticized during her campaign for comparing Raynor to a slave and comparing Nassau County Democratic Committee chairman Jay Jacobs to a plantation owner.

New York State Assembly
Preceded by Ivan Lafayette	New York State Assembly; Deputy Speaker; 2009-2018	Succeeded by Catherine Nolan
Preceded by Barbara Patton	New York State Assembly; 18th District; 1988-2018	Succeeded by Taylor Raynor
