= Peconic County, New York =

Hypothetical new county on Long Island, New York

Coordinates: 40.9655331°N 72.4598745°W

The proposed Peconic County flag showed the two forks at the east end of Long Island separated by Peconic Bay. The star on the north represents Southold. The stars on the South Fork represent Southampton and East Hampton. Riverhead is at the fork mouth and Shelter Island is between the forks.

A map showing the proposed location of Peconic County.

Peconic County (/pəˈkɒnɪk/) is a proposed new county on Long Island in the U.S. state of New York that would secede the five easternmost towns of Suffolk County: East Hampton, Riverhead, Shelter Island, Southampton and Southold, plus the Shinnecock Indian Reservation.

It derives its name from Peconic Bay which is the dividing body of water separating the North and South forks of Long Island.

== History ==
Peconic County has been discussed since the 1960s – ever since Suffolk County moved its offices from the official county seat in Riverhead 32 miles (51 km) west to Hauppauge, New York, in more densely populated western Suffolk County. Due to the region's small population, contributing just 2 of the Legislature's 18 members, the region was often overlooked by county officials, and were deemed "municipal orphans." Deciding that they would more efficiently run local courts, jails, and health services, municipal leaders began to seek the creation of a new county, tentatively called Peconic County.

In 1996 a nonbinding referendum was put on the ballot during the elections that year on forming a new county that was approved with 71% of the vote. State Assembly Speaker Sheldon Silver did not allow the movement to advance, and blocked other movements, fearing a wave of similar bids to split up counties state-wide, in line with Andrew Cuomo's policy of instead reducing the number of counties via mergers. At the same time Staten Island had been pressing for the reformation of Richmond County, with the two movements coordinating between each other. In 1997 Peconic County Now sued the state attempting to force through the secession.

In 2015, New York State Assemblyman Fred Thiele championed Peconic separatism, and was dubbed the “Patron Saint of Peconic County” seeking to revive the movement after Silver was arrested during a corruption scandal.

== Ideology ==
Peconic County separatism is almost entirely supported by members of the Republican party, especially as Democrats have a long-standing policy of pursuing the merger of counties. Fred Thiele an assemblyman who supported the Peconic cause was a Republican, and said that as long as the speaker of the New York State House was a Democrat, the Peconic cause was impossible. Anthony Palumbo, also a Republican, supports the cause as a way to benefit the region from a financial standpoint.

Despite this, the proposed county leans towards the Democratic Party. It has voted for the Democratic presidential candidate in 2024, 2020, and 2016.

== Criticism ==
Joe Sawicki, a former county comptroller and assemblyman, denounced the movement as drawing support away for the cause of turning Long Island into a state.

== Organizations ==
- Peconic County Now: Led by Larry Cantwell, former supervisor of East Hampton

== Area and population ==
At the 2020 census, the five towns and the Shinnecock Reservation had a land area of 900.581 km^{2} (347.716 sq mi), or about 38.12 percent of Suffolk County's land area. Its total population was 161,127 inhabitants, or about 10.56 percent of the county's population. Its average population density was 178.91/km^{2} (463.38/mi^{2}). If the proposed secession were to occur, the surviving Suffolk County would have a land area of 1,462.001 km^{2} (564.482 sq mi) and an adjusted 2020 census population of 1,364,793 inhabitants. It would be left with a population density of 933.51/km^{2} (2,417.78/mi^{2}). As can be seen, the western part of Suffolk has more than five times the population density of its eastern neighbor.

== Places within the proposed county ==
Towns

- East Hampton
- Riverhead
- Shelter Island
- Southampton
- Southold

Villages

- Dering Harbor
- East Hampton
- Greenport
- North Haven
- Quogue
- Sag Harbor
- Sagaponack
- Southampton
- Westhampton Beach
- West Hampton Dunes

Other communities

- Cupsogue Beach
- Remsenburg
- Speonk

Indian reservations

- Shinnecock

Census-designated places

- Amagansett
- Aquebogue
- Baiting Hollow
- Bridgehampton
- Calverton
- Cutchogue
- East Hampton North
- East Marion
- East Quogue
- Eastport
- Fishers Island
- Flanders
- Greenport West
- Hampton Bays
- Jamesport
- Laurel
- Manorville
- Mattituck
- Montauk
- Napeague
- New Suffolk
- North Sea
- Northampton
- Northville
- Northwest Harbor
- Noyack
- Orient
- Peconic
- Quiogue
- Remsenburg-Speonk
- Riverhead
- Riverside
- Shelter Island
- Shelter Island Heights
- Shinnecock Hills
- Southold
- Springs
- Tuckahoe
- Wading River
- Wainscott
- Water Mill
- Westhampton

== See also ==
- Adirondack County - another proposed county in New York
