= New York's 2nd State Assembly district =

American legislative district

Assemblymember
Jodi Giglio; R–Baiting Hollow

New York's 2nd State Assembly district is one of the 150 districts in the New York State Assembly. It has been represented by Jodi Giglio since 2021, replacing Anthony Palumbo.

== Geography ==
=== 2020s ===
District 2 is located entirely within Suffolk County, comprising the northern portion of the county. It includes portions of the town of Brookhaven and Southampton, and the town of Riverhead.

The 2nd district overlaps New York's 1st and 2nd congressional districts, as well as the 1st and 3rd districts of the New York State Senate.

=== 2010s ===
District 2 is located entirely within Suffolk County, comprising the northern portion of the county. It includes portions of the town of Brookhaven, and the towns of Riverhead and Southold.

== Recent election results ==
=== 2026 ===
2026 New York State Assembly election, District 2
Party	Candidate	Votes	%
Republican	Jodi Giglio		
Conservative	Jodi Giglio		
Total	Jodi Giglio (incumbent)		
Democratic	Michael Szika		
Voter Options	Kimberly Wilder		
Write-in			
Total votes			

=== 2024 ===
2024 New York State Assembly election, District 2
Party	Candidate	Votes	%
Republican	Jodi Giglio	40,975	
Conservative	Jodi Giglio	5,513	
Total	Jodi Giglio (incumbent)	46,488	64.6
Democratic	Tricia Chiaramonte	25,455	35.4
Write-in		28	0.0
Total votes		71,971	100.0
Republican hold			

=== 2022 ===
2022 New York State Assembly election, District 2
Party	Candidate	Votes	%
Republican	Jodi Giglio	31,941	
Conservative	Jodi Giglio	5,113	
Total	Jodi Giglio (incumbent)	36,604	65.9
Democratic	Wendy Hamberger	18,948	34.1
Write-in		4	0.0
Total votes		55,556	100.0
Republican hold			

=== 2020 ===
2020 New York State Assembly election, District 2
Primary election
Party	Candidate	Votes	%
Democratic	Laura Jens-Smith	6,743	76.0
Democratic	William Schleisner	2,122	23.9
Write-in		9	0.1
Total votes		8,874	100
General election
Republican	Jodi Giglio	34,874	
Conservative	Jodi Giglio	4,378	
Independence	Jodi Giglio	651	
Total	Jodi Giglio	39,903	56.2
Democratic	Laura Jens-Smith	28,501	
Working Families	Laura Jens-Smith	1,640	
Total	Laura Jens-Smith	30,141	42.5
Libertarian	William Van Helmond	926	1.3
Write-in		6	0.0
Total votes		70,976	100.0
Republican hold			

=== 2018 ===
2018 New York State Assembly election, District 2
Primary election
Party	Candidate	Votes	%
Republican	Anthony Palumbo (incumbent)	2,939	80.6
Republican	Mike Yacubich	707	19.4
Write-in		0	0.0
Total votes		3,646	100
General election
Republican	Anthony Palumbo	26,760	
Conservative	Anthony Palumbo	3,439	
Independence	Anthony Palumbo	1,043	
Total	Anthony Palumbo (incumbent)	31,242	59.2
Democratic	Rona Smith	21,533	40.8
Write-in		13	0.0
Total votes		52,788	100.0
Republican hold			

=== 2016 ===
2016 New York State Assembly election, District 2
Party	Candidate	Votes	%
Republican	Anthony Palumbo	32,636	
Conservative	Anthony Palumbo	5,235	
Independence	Anthony Palumbo	1,724	
Reform	Anthony Palumbo	200	
Total	Anthony Palumbo (incumbent)	39,795	67.0
Democratic	Michael Conroy	19,575	33.0
Write-in		33	0.0
Total votes		59,403	100.0
Republican hold			

=== 2014 ===
2014 New York State Assembly election, District 2
Primary election
Party	Candidate	Votes	%
Independence	Thomas Schiliro	134	51.9
Independence	Anthony Palumbo (incumbent)	124	48.1
Write-in		0	0.0
Total votes		258	100
General election
Republican	Anthony Palumbo	18,152	
Conservative	Anthony Palumbo	4,182	
Total	Anthony Palumbo (incumbent)	22,334	63.0
Democratic	Thomas Schiliro	11,011	
Independence	Thomas Schiliro	1,124	
Working Families	Thomas Schiliro	978	
Total	Thomas Schiliro	13,113	37.0
Write-in		14	0.0
Total votes		35,461	100.0
Republican hold			

=== 2013 special ===
Incumbent Daniel Losquadro resigned in March 2013 to serve as Highway Superintendent for the town of Brookhaven, triggering a special election. In special elections for state legislative offices, primaries are usually not held – county committee members for each party select nominees.

2013 New York State Assembly special election, District 2
Party	Candidate	Votes	%
Republican	Anthony Palumbo	11,576	
Conservative	Anthony Palumbo	3,884	
Total	Anthony Palumbo	15,460	57.1
Democratic	John McManmon	9,574	
Independence	John McManmon	1,267	
Working Families	John McManmon	735	
Total	John McManmon	11,576	42.8
Write-in		19	0.1
Total votes		27,055	100.0
Republican hold			

=== 2012 ===
2012 New York State Assembly election, District 134
Party	Candidate	Votes	%
Republican	Daniel Losquadro	27,207	
Conservative	Daniel Losquadro	5,224	
Independence	Daniel Losquadro	1,948	
Total	Daniel Losquadro (incumbent)	34,379	65.4
Democratic	Nicholas Deegan	18,226	34.6
Write-in		9	0.0
Total votes		52,614	100.0
Republican hold			
