= Acampora =

Acampora is an Italian surname. Notable people with the surname include:

- Anthony Acampora, American electrical engineer
- Gennaro Acampora (born 1994), Italian footballer
- Patricia Acampora (born 1945), American politician
