= Chris Murray =

Chris Murray may refer to:

== Government ==
- Chris Murray (Canadian civil servant), city manager of Toronto
- Chris Murray (British politician), member of parliament for Edinburgh East and Musselburgh
- Chris Murray (American politician), member-elect for the New York State Senate
- Christopher W. Murray (born 1953), former United States ambassador to the Republic of the Congo
- Christopher M. Murray, chief judge of the Michigan Court of Claims

== Sports ==
- Kris Murray (born 2000), American basketball player
- Chris Murray (ice hockey, born 1974), Canadian ice hockey right winger
- Chris Murray (ice hockey, born 1984), American ice hockey defenceman
- Christopher Murray (swimmer) (born 1978), Bahamian swimmer
- Chris Murray (weightlifter), British weightlifter

== Others ==
- Chris Murray (musician) (born 1966), Canadian singer-songwriter
- Christopher Murray (actor) (born 1957), American actor
- Christopher B. Murray, North American chemist
- Christopher J.L. Murray, American public health scholar
