= Long Island (proposed state) =

Proposed U.S. State

Coordinates: 40.789°N 73.133°W

The independent Long Island flag proposed by Cesidio Tallini.

Long Island, a large island directly south of New England, has made attempts in the past to secede from New York and become its own state. Mentions of Long Island secession range from 1896 to 2010. The proposed 51st state has also speculated the combination of Nassau and Suffolk counties into one county in order to reduce costs.

The state of Long Island would include over 2.7 million people, not including the more populous west end of the island. Nassau County executive Ed Mangano came out in support of such a proposal in April 2010 and was said to be commissioning a study on it.

Under Article Four, Section 3, clause 1 of the federal Constitution, both the New York State Legislature and the United States Congress would need to approve any secession from New York. The State Legislature has thus far resisted all attempts at secession.

== Secession history ==
A map comparing the counties and towns of Long Island based on statehood proposals. Brooklyn and Queens (two boroughs of New York City) are sometimes included in statehood proposals. Nassau County The western part of Suffolk County The eastern part of Suffolk County is often separated as a proposed Peconic County.

The first known proposal of Long Island as its own state was published in The New York Times in 1896. Sugar refiner Adolph Molenhaur claimed other big cities in New York did not take Long Island into account when making decisions and were spending money without any benefit to Long Island's interests.

In the 1990s, New York State Assemblyman Joseph Sawicki introduced a bill that would have seen Long Island split off of New York as the 51st state, however, the proposal never went anywhere.

In 1996, a non-binding vote took place in which the idea of secession was approved. However, no further action was taken at that time.

On March 28, 2008, now Suffolk County comptroller Sawicki proposed a plan that would make Long Island (specifically, Nassau and Suffolk counties) the 51st state of the United States of America (or, should Upstate New York and/or Western New York be included in the breakup of New York State, the 52nd or 53rd). Sawicki said that all the Long Island taxpayers' money would stay on Long Island, rather than the funds being dispersed all over the entire state of New York.

In 2009, there was a call for home rule of Long Island by political leaders who were angry about a tax. Suffolk County was on board with the plan but Nassau County showed no support.

In 2010, the Nassau County Executive Ed Mangano had a plan to combine Nassau and Suffolk counties and to secede from New York and wanted to formally look into the idea.

In late 2022, Long Island assemblymen Keith Brown proposed seceding to the New York State Assembly on the basis that Long Island is "an ATM machine [sic] for New York City", believing that the island has enough money and local services to be its own independent state. On the contrary, Philip Ramos has stated his concerns with the proposal calling the idea "insane", believing the island as an independent state could not provide essential services and would marginalize minority communities living on the island. As of August 2023 no such bill has been put forward.

== Supporters vs. Opponents ==
=== Supporters ===
In the 1990s State Assemblyman Joe Sawicki introduced a bill that would have seen Long Island split off from New York as the 51st State. Sawicki's motivation was because Long Island, despite making up just 15% of New York's population at the time, paid 20% of the state's estate taxes and 17% of the state's income taxes which he felt was unfair. Sawicki left the assembly in 1993, and in 2008 he returned to politics, becoming a full-time advocate for Long Island secession.

An extreme supporter is Cesidio Tallini. He created a micronation named Winnecomac, originally named Independent Long Island until February 2nd 2013, special code "WQ", which aims for the entire island of Long Island to become a nation separate from the United States. This idea was not popular among Long Islanders, but has gained attention from the media. Tallini was featured in a 2007 article in The New York Times.

=== Opponents ===
The Long Island statehood movement has clashed with the movement to establish a new Peconic County out of Suffolk county with Sawicki arguing that the Peconic movement was dividing the efforts of like-minded individuals. The Peconic movement argues that the East End pays more than it receives in taxes to Suffolk and has a different cultural makeup to the rest of the county, both arguments the Long Island secessionist movement claims between Long Island and the rest of the state.

== See also ==
- Partition and secession in New York
