= Partition and secession in New York =

Hypothetical division of New York state

Map of New York

There are and have been several movements regarding secession from the U.S. state of New York. Only one of them – the state of Vermont – succeeded. Among the unsuccessful ones, the most prominent included the proposed state of Long Island, usually proposed as consisting of Suffolk and Nassau counties; a state called Niagara, the western counties of New York state; the northern counties of New York state called Upstate New York; making the city of New York a state; a proposal for a new Peconic County on eastern Long Island; and for the borough of Staten Island to secede from New York City.

Article 4, Section 3 of the Constitution of the United States includes a provision that "no new State shall be formed or erected within the Jurisdiction of any other State; nor any State be formed by the Junction of two or more States, or Parts of States, without the Consent of the Legislatures of the States concerned as well as of the Congress". At the time of Vermont's secession in 1777, the Constitution of the United States did not yet exist. By the time Congress recognized Vermont and admitted it to the Union in 1791, the Constitution was in effect and the legislature of New York had consented. All later secession proposals would require similar consent.

== History ==
Proposed map of an independent New York City.

Tensions between what eventually became upstate and downstate New York had existed since Leisler's Rebellion in 1689. That rebellion was more heavily supported in the lower Hudson Valley, near modern New York City, than it was in the Albany area, which remained loyal to the English crown (at the time, the Glorious Revolution was underway in England). Although the rebellion was settled in 1691 when Leisler was executed, tensions between the upper and lower Hudson Valley remained high for another two decades afterward.

=== Vermont, 1777 ===
The only successful secession from the state of New York was that of Vermont in 1777, and whether that amounted to secession depends on the validity of New York's always-disputed claim to Vermont. After Vermont had been governed for 15 years as a de facto part of New Hampshire, King George III had ruled on July 20, 1764, that the disputed territory belonged to New York and not to New Hampshire. The disputed territory later became the state of Vermont. The government of New York refused to recognize the property rights of homesteaders who had settled there under the laws of New Hampshire from 1749 to 1764. Armed militias, formed by settlers in the region (most prominently the Green Mountain Boys) prevented the government of New York from evicting settlers from their land and largely prevented New York from governing at all. Sovereignty also continued to be relatively passively asserted by New Hampshire until 1782.

After the United States Declaration of Independence, the people of the New Hampshire Grants (as the region was then called) could no longer hope for redress from the courts of England. Consequently, they issued the Vermont Declaration of Independence in January 1777, including a long list of grievances against the government of New York. For 14 years after that, Vermont functioned as a de facto independent country. The question of recognizing it and admitting it to the Union was occasionally discussed in the Continental Congress, but New York's representatives successfully opposed it. On March 2, 1784, New York's governor, George Clinton, asked Congress to declare war on Vermont, the object being to overthrow Vermont's government and reincorporate Vermont into New York, but Congress did not act, and some members proposed recognizing Vermont and offering it admission to the Union. On March 6, 1790, the legislature of New York expressed its consent to the admission to the Union of what they called "the community now actually exercising independent jurisdiction as 'the State of Vermont'", provided an agreement on the boundary between the two states could be reached. In the ensuing negotiations, Vermont's commissioners insisted on also settling the numerous real-estate disputes arising from conflicting land grants from New York, New Hampshire, and Vermont, rather than leaving those to be decided in a federal court. On October 7, 1790, the commissioners proclaimed the negotiations concluded. In January 1791, a convention called by the state of Vermont ratified the Constitution of the United States, declaring that it would be part of the law of Vermont as soon as Congress admitted that state. On February 18, 1791, Congress decided to admit Vermont to the Union two weeks later on March 4.

=== Post-Revolution era ===
In the battle over the ratification of the United States Constitution in 1787–1788, Governor George Clinton in Albany, wishing to preserve his power, led the local Anti-Federalists in opposition, with support for the Constitution coming from Alexander Hamilton and the Federalists, who were largely urbanites and saw opportunity in a stronger national union and published The Federalist Papers as their manifesto in several New York City newspapers, including The Independent Journal. There was a large divide, and with the recent independence of Vermont, a threat of secession of New York City and the southern counties to join the new Federal government. The leaders of Richmond County (Staten Island), which maintained an ambiguous position, threatened to join New Jersey. With secession threatening to marginalize Governor Clinton and a lightly developed upstate, the Constitution was ratified and the crisis passed.

At the time, much of what is now upstate New York, particularly Western New York was disputed and unsettled frontier territory, with Pennsylvania, Massachusetts, and Connecticut claiming portions of the mostly undeveloped land. This frontier land was not included in the Northwest Ordinance (unorganized territory north of the Ohio River, east of the Mississippi, and south of The Great Lakes), but it was not until the Phelps and Gorham Purchase and the Holland Purchase that it became New York territory.

=== Civil War era ===
In the period of national crisis immediately preceding the American Civil War, Democratic Mayor Fernando Wood proposed the secession of New York City as a sovereign city-state to be called the Free City of Tri-Insula (Tri-Insula meaning "three islands" in Latin), and incorporating Manhattan, Long Island and Staten Island. In an address to the city's Common Council on January 6, 1861, Mayor Wood expressed a Copperhead sympathy with the seceding states and a desire to maintain profitable cotton shipping, confidence that the city-state would prosper on the import tariffs that then supplied 2/3 of federal revenue, and especially dissatisfaction with the state government at Albany. But the idea of leaving the United States proved too radical even in the turmoil of 1861 and was poorly received, especially after the Southern bombardment of Fort Sumter starting on April 12. The war, and especially conscription, was nevertheless often unpopular in the city, sparking the deadly New York Draft Riots. The neighboring City of Brooklyn, in contrast, was staunchly Unionist.

Coincidentally, the upstate locale of Town Line, New York voted to secede from the Union, contributing five soldiers to the Confederate troops. (Twenty residents fought for the Union Army.) Since Town Line was an unincorporated community with no legal status, the secession vote had no legal effect, and the Confederacy never recognized it. Town Line ceremonially "rejoined" the Union in 1946; its residents paid taxes during its time "out of the union", which amounted to 85 years.

=== 1969 ===
A proposed state flag for New York City during the city's statehood movement.

In 1969, writer Norman Mailer and columnist Jimmy Breslin ran together on an independent ticket seeking the mayoralty and City Council Presidency, challenging Mayor John Lindsay with an agenda to make New York City the 51st state. When questioned as to the name of the new state, Breslin said the city deserved to keep "New York" and that upstate should be renamed "Buffalo", after its largest city.

=== 2000s ===
A 51-star flag.

On February 26, 2003, a bill was introduced by Astoria, Queens Council Member Peter Vallone, Jr., and sponsored by 20 of 51 City Council members, reviving the idea of referendum for secession from New York State in the context of the red state vs. blue state divide and opposition to the policies of Governor George Pataki. A committee report was written but otherwise little action was taken, and the bill was reintroduced with one additional sponsor on the same date in 2004. Like Mayor Wood, Council Member Vallone emphasized the fiscal benefits of secession, with revenue now derived not from tariffs, but from Wall Street. Council Member Vallone reintroduced the bill in 2006.

In January 2008, Vallone again offered a bill for the secession of New York City from New York state. After Mayor Michael Bloomberg testified to New York state legislators that New York City gives the state $11 billion more than it gets back, Vallone stated: "If not secession, somebody please tell me what other options we have if the state is going to continue to take billions from us and give us back pennies? Should we raise taxes some more? Should we cut services some more? Or should we consider seriously going out on our own?" The New York City Council planned to hold a meeting on the topic.

=== 2010s ===
In 2015, fifteen towns in Sullivan, Delaware, Broome, and Tioga counties were reported to be looking into seceding from the State of New York and joining the state of Pennsylvania. One reason given for the movement was Governor Andrew Cuomo's move to ban hydraulic fracturing, which is legal in Pennsylvania. Concurrently, groups of state legislators from Long Island and upstate New York introduced legislation to gauge support for partitioning the state; the bills were introduced shortly after Sheldon Silver, who had served as Speaker of the New York State Assembly for two decades and was an ardent opponent of such a partition, was deposed from his post as part of a federal investigation.

== Long Island secession ==
On Long Island, there also have been calls for Nassau and Suffolk Counties to separate from New York State. Former Suffolk County comptroller and former state assemblyman Joseph Sawicki called for a separation of Long Island from the rest of the state, saying that the region, one of the wealthiest in the state, receives only $5.2 billion in state payments and pays $8.1 billion in taxes. Nassau County executive Ed Mangano came out in support of such a proposal in April 2010 and commissioned a study on it. Long Island also had a movement pushing for the secession of the entire geographic island (Kings, Queens, Nassau, and Suffolk counties) from the state of New York.

== Upstate secession ==
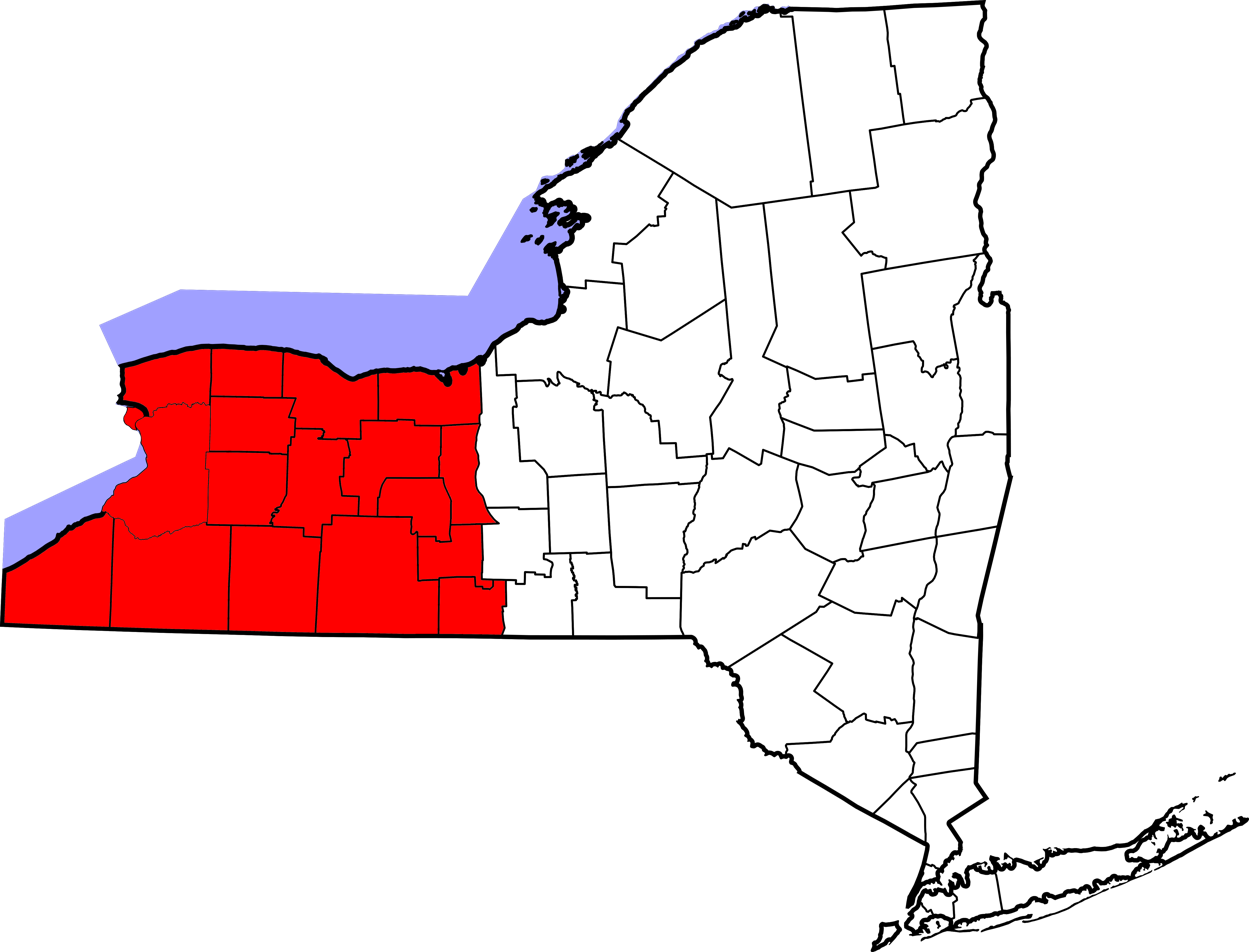
Areas in Western New York (shown here) and the Southern Tier have seen the most support for an independent upstate.

A parallel Upstate New York statehood movement seeks separation due to taxation and economic concerns. Such proposals often include excising Albany (and presumably the Hudson River Valley) along with New York City, due to a perception that Albany is primarily controlled by politicians from the New York City area. A separate but related movement only includes Western New York (and sometimes portions of Central New York and the Southern Tier) in the secession efforts as an independent state or commonwealth entitled "Niagara".

Much of upstate New York (unsettled by Europeans until the 19th century but inhabited by the Haudenosaunee) was not part of New York State during colonial times. Due to an oversight or perhaps to foster competition, two Kings of England (Charles I and Charles II) awarded the same upstate New York territory as part of sea-to-sea grants to Massachusetts Bay Colony and New York Colony respectively; Pennsylvania Colony also separately laid claim to much of the territory now in the Southern Tier up until 1774. It was not until 1786, with the Treaty of Hartford, that the dispute was settled; New York got territorial rights, but Massachusetts got to sell the land to developers. In 1792, a portion encompassing modern-day Erie, Pennsylvania (given to New York in the treaty) was sold to Pennsylvania. The Niagara Frontier, which had been explored by and part of French Canada, served as the western front of the Revolutionary War and (as British territory) the War of 1812, and did not fall securely into American sovereignty until the end of that war.

An upper portion of the province of New York seceded: the northeastern corner of the province became self-governing in 1777 during the American Revolution, and it was granted statehood in its own right as Vermont in 1791. It was the first state in the union which had not been a separate British colony.

Support for a separation from within upstate surged in the second half of the 20th century, possibly due in part to several U.S. Supreme Court rulings (see Baker v. Carr and Reynolds v. Sims) that established a mandate of one man, one vote in all state legislatures. The rulings gave New York City significant legislative advantages over upstate, which coincidentally entered a prolonged economic and population decline at around the same time. Former State Senator and U.S. Congressman Randy Kuhl, from rural upstate Hammondsport, advocated splitting the state into "New York" and "West New York" and introduced several bills to that effect during his time in the state senate. State senators Joseph Robach, Dale Volker, and Michael Ranzenhofer, Republicans from Western New York, proposed a nonbinding referendum to gauge support for dividing the state in November 2009. Republican Assemblyman Stephen Hawley introduced a bill in February 2013 to give each county an opportunity to provide feedback on potential partition of the state. Hawley, who had introduced similar bills previously, supported the idea on the grounds that the financial and logistic situations in each region of the state were vastly different.

The Public Policy Institute of New York State said in May 2004: "Secession would be impossible, and the last thing New York needs is some kind of destructive Upstate-Downstate showdown. But given the prolonged lag in Upstate’s economy, it is time to think seriously about whether there is a way of restructuring the relationship to give Upstate the opportunity—indeed, the freedom—to reduce some of the disadvantages that are smothering its economy." The Empire Center, a fiscally conservative think tank, advocated using the 2017 constitutional convention to grant more home rule powers to local municipalities to address the upstate/downstate conflicts, before the referendum that would have allowed the convention was defeated.

== Intrastate secession proposals ==
=== Peconic County secession from Suffolk County ===
A map showing the proposed location of Peconic County.

Peconic County is a proposed new county in New York that would secede the five easternmost towns of Suffolk County: East Hampton, Riverhead, Shelter Island, Southampton and Southold, plus the Shinnecock Indian Reservation.

71 percent of the east end voters in 1997 approved a nonbinding resolution to secede. However, the New York State Assembly did not approve the enabling legislation. East End newspapers speculated that the Assembly was afraid it would encourage a tidal wave of secessions in the state including Staten Island seceding from New York City and perhaps even causing the division of upstate and downstate New York.

This move to secede fell dormant in 1998.

=== Staten Island secession from New York City ===
The "Greater City" exists as a result of actions of the New York State Legislature, and, as such, could be reduced in size by the same mechanism. A non-binding referendum in the borough of Staten Island was held in 1993 to consider whether it should be allowed to secede from the city. The New York City government and Mayor David Dinkins opposed the vote, contending that the referendum should not be permitted by the state unless the city issued a home rule message supporting it, which the city would not. Governor Mario Cuomo disagreed, and the vote went forward. Many Staten Island politicians, including Senator John J. Marchi and Assemblyman Eric N. Vitaliano supported the movement. Vote Yes, Inc. was formed as a nonpartisan, grass-roots organization in January 1990. Its initial purpose was to secure a "yes" vote for the November 1990 referendum on Staten Island secession. Ultimately, 65% of Staten Island residents voted to secede, through the approval of a new city charter making Staten Island an independent city, but implementation was blocked in the State Assembly.

The Staten Island secession movement was defused by the election of Rudy Giuliani as New York City mayor on the same ballot. He had campaigned on the promise that Staten Island's grievances would be addressed. Giuliani's plurality in his narrow victory over Dinkins was aided by overwhelming support from Staten Island. Two of the borough's biggest demands were closing the Fresh Kills Landfill and making the Staten Island Ferry free, both of which were done. However, after the election of Bill de Blasio as Mayor in 2013, interest in secession was revived. In 2019, New York City councilman Joe Borelli announced his plan to introduce another set of bills to study the feasibility of secession.

In December 2019, Michael Reilly, a Republican assemblyman from Staten Island, expressed interest in joining upstate (the "New Amsterdam" Region) in the event it broke off from New York City. The Divide New York State Caucus, Inc. proposal and current bill to partition the State into three autonomous regions includes the right for "owners of parcels of land that are adjacent to each other [...] within a single county may separate from any city (cities) and/or town(s) [...] and incorporate a new town". Such an action would require: (A) "one-fifth (1/5) of the owners of land in the proposed new town sign a petition agreeing to the map and charter"; (B) "must have at least two thousand (2000) people residing in it"; and (C) "If a majority of those voting approve of it" at the "next election day in November".

Following the election of Zohran Mamdani in the 2025 mayoral election the issue of Staten Island separation was again revived, mostly as Staten Island voted for Mamdani's opponents Andrew Cuomo and Curtis Sliwa. Sliwa had openly campaigned in favor of secession stating: “You remember the movie with Kurt Russell, Escape From New York? They will make a sequel" and also floated the idea of Staten Island becoming part of New Jersey. After Mamdani's victory State Assemblyman Sam Pirozzolo (R) read a "Staten Island Independence Declaration" at the corner of Richmond Road and New Dorp Lane, the former site of the Rose and Crown Tavern, stating that Staten Island was already overtaxed, and would bear the brunt of Mamdani's proposed tax increases; it is unclear if north Staten Island would be included as it had voted for Mamdani.

=== Dividing New York State into three autonomous regions ===
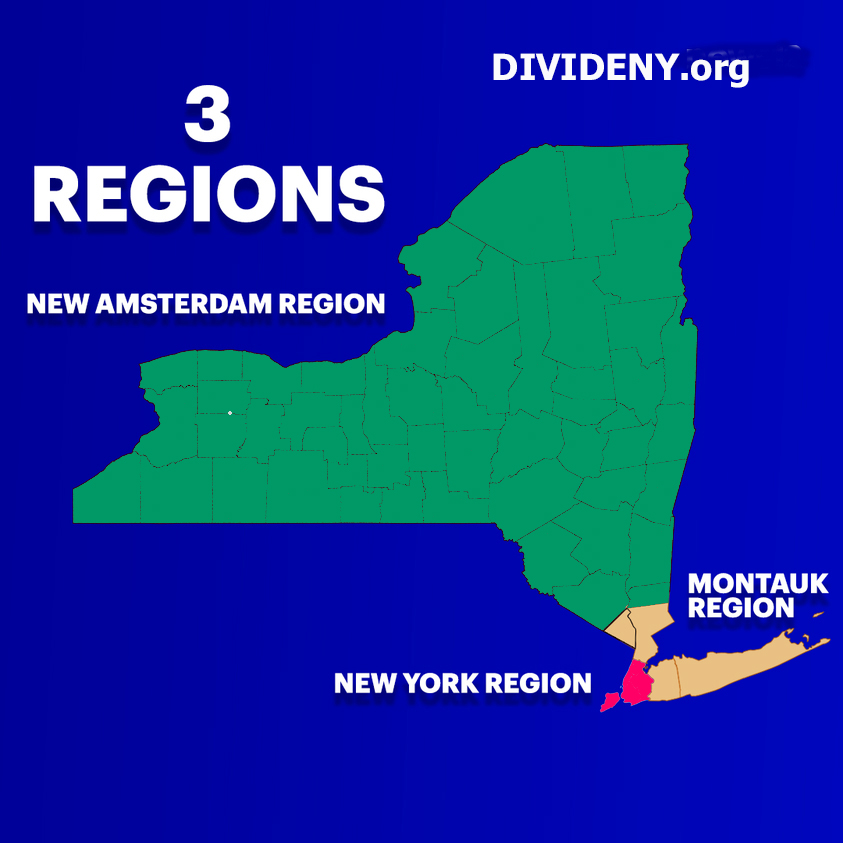
Three autonomous regions map

By the 2010s, the Divide New York State Caucus, Inc. had drafted a proposal to partition the State into three autonomous regions: The "New Amsterdam" Region (Upstate), the "New York" Region (the city), and a third region of "Montauk" (Long Island, and Rockland and Westchester counties). The proposals that includes the three autonomous regions are bills A05498 and Feb 2023 S3093. The Assembly sponsor is David DiPietro of Assembly district 147. The Senate sponsor is Senator Pam Helming of the 54th State Senate district.

In addition to the sponsors there are several co-sponsors, notably of which includes recent Assembly minority leader Brian Kolb of District 131. This proposal would leave the "state governor [...] with only token powers about the same as the queen of England", as described by Assemblymember DiPietro. By dividing into intrastate regions, instead of separate States, it would bypass Congress who is seen as the major hurdle. It would give each region its own governor, legislature, and judicial branch.

The plan is to amend the State Constitution via a Constitutional Convention or a legislative majority. Unlike standard bills, a constitutional amendment does not need the governor's approval. An alternate plan is having municipalities to use the NYS constitution home rule clause to encourage the legislature to submit the amendment to the voters. The plan calls for regional senators and assembly representatives from both regions to also serve as the New York State Legislature. Both regions would also have an elected Regional Governor, Regional Lieutenant-Governor, and Regional Secretary of State. The residual state government would still have an elected Governor, Lieutenant-Governor, and Comptroller.

== See also ==
- Secession in the United States
- Urban secession
- List of U.S. state secession proposals
