= Daniel Losquadro =

American politician

Member of the New York State Assembly
- In office January 1, 2011 – March 12, 2013
- Preceded by: Marc Alessi
- Succeeded by: Anthony Palumbo
- Constituency: 1st district (2011-2012); 2nd district (2013)

Personal details
- Born: September 3, 1972 (age 54) Locust Valley, New York
- Party: Republican
- Spouse: Lynn
- Children: Joseph, Meghan
- Education: State University of New York at Stony Brook
- Website: Official website

Daniel P. "Dan" Losquadro (born September 3, 1972) is an American politician who was a member of the New York State Assembly.

Losquadro is a lifelong Suffolk County, New York resident who was raised in Wading River and attended Shoreham-Wading River schools. Later, Losquadro married and bought a home in Shoreham where he now resides with his wife Lynn, who is a math teacher at Albert G. Prodell Middle School, and son Joseph.

He graduated from the State University of New York at Stony Brook, earning a B.A. degree in history. For nearly a decade before taking office, he worked as a senior property claims estimator for State Farm Insurance.

A Republican, Losquadro won election to Suffolk County’s 6th Legislative District in November 2003 and served full-time until January 2011. He has served as chairman of the Environment, Planning and Agriculture Committee as well as the Veterans & Seniors Committee. In 2006, Losquadro was elected by his peers as the legislature’s Minority Leader.

In November 2010, he defeated incumbent Marc Alessi in an election to represent the 1st Assembly District of the New York State Assembly. In November 2012, after re-apportionment, he was re-elected in the 2nd District. In March 2013, he was elected Highway Superintendent of Brookhaven Town. He was sworn into office on March 12, 2013 at a town hall ceremony. He is a candidate for Suffolk County Comptroller in the 2026 election to replace John M. Kennedy Jr.

== Election results ==
- November 2010 general election, NYS Assembly, 2nd AD

Daniel P. Losquadro (REP - CON - STR)	...	23,860
Marc S. Alessi (DEM - IND - WOR)	...	22,943

New York State Assembly
Preceded by Marc Alessi	New York State Assembly; 1st District; 2011–2012	Succeeded by Fred W. Thiele, Jr.
Preceded by Fred W. Thiele, Jr.	New York State Assembly; 2nd District; 2013	Succeeded by Anthony Palumbo
