= John L. Behan =

American politician (1944–2021)

Member of the New York State Assembly from the 2nd district
- In office January 1, 1983 – February 8, 1995
- Preceded by: George J. Hochbrueckner
- Succeeded by: Fred Thiele

Member of the New York State Assembly from the 1st district
- In office January 1, 1979 – December 31, 1982
- Preceded by: Perry B. Duryea Jr.
- Succeeded by: Joseph Sawicki Jr.

Personal details
- Born: November 11, 1944
- Died: January 28, 2021 (aged 76) Montauk, New York, U.S.
- Party: Republican

John L. Behan (November 11, 1944 – January 28, 2021) was an American politician who served in the New York State Assembly from 1979 to 1995.

New York State Assembly
| Preceded by Perry B. Duryea Jr. | Member of the New York State Assembly from the 1st district 1979–1982 | Succeeded by Joseph Sawicki Jr. |
| Preceded by George J. Hochbrueckner | Member of the New York State Assembly from the 2nd district 1983–1995 | Succeeded by Fred Thiele |
