= List of Phi Eta Sigma members =

Phi Eta Sigma is an American freshman honor society that was founded at the University of Illinois on March 22, 1923. Following is a list of some of its notable members.

== Academia ==
- Nancy Bentley, professor of English at the University of Pennsylvania
- Anthony E. Clark, Sinologist, historian and writer
- William Dudley Geer, dean of the School of Business at Samford University
- Leigh Gerdine, president of Webster University and founder of the Opera Theatre of Saint Louis
- Paul G. Halpern, naval historian at Florida State University
- George Hilton Jones III, historian and college professor
- Kristen Kroll, stem cell biologist and Professor of Developmental Biology at Washington University School of Medicine
- David M. Lampton, director of China studies emeritus at the Johns Hopkins University
- Ben Lawton, president of the University of Wisconsin's board of regents, physician, thoracic surgeon, and healthcare-reformer
- Charles G. Overberger, chair of chemistry at the Polytechnic Institute of Brooklyn and the University of Michigan
- Mercedes Richards, astronomy and astrophysics professor
- Floyd Van Nest Schultz, professor of electrical engineering at the University of Tennessee and Purdue University
- Seymour I. Schwartz, professor and chairman of the Department of Surgery at the University of Rochester
- Arthur Cutts Willard, president of the University of Illinois system
- Martin King Whyte, sociology professor emeritus at Harvard University

== Astronauts ==
- Joseph P. Allen, astronaut
- James P. Bagian, physician, astronaut and engineer
- Charles E. Brady Jr., astronaut, physician and Navy captain
- Dale Gardner, astronaut
- J. Wayne Littles, eighth director of the NASA Marshall Space Flight Center
- Steven R. Nagel, test pilot, astronaut and engineer
- Robert L. Stewart, NASA astronaut who was a brigadier general of the United States Army
- David Wolf, astronaut, medical doctor, and electrical engineer

== Entertainment ==
- Allison Kreiger, model

== Law ==
- James G. Exum, Chief Justice of the North Carolina Supreme Court and member of the North Carolina House of Representatives
- Gabriel Marques, attorney, fiscal officer of Nassau County, New York, and an adjunct professor at Molloy College
- William C. Mims, Justice of the Supreme Court of Virginia, Attorney General of Virginia, Virginia Senate, and Virginia House of Delegates
- Hardy Myers, Attorney General of Oregon and Speaker of the Oregon House of Representatives
- Wilkes C. Robinson, Senior Judge of the United States Court of Federal Claims
- Aaron Twerski, professor at Brooklyn Law School and dean and professor of tort law at Hofstra University School of Law

== Military ==
- John F. Bolt, U.S. naval aviator and flying ace
- A. Ernest Fitzgerald, member of the Senior Executive Service in the United States Air Force, and a prominent U.S. government whistleblower
- Clyde Kenneth Harris, one of the "Monuments Men" during World War II
- Robert L. Stewart, NASA astronaut who was a brigadier general of the United States Army

== Politics ==
- Rob Bryan, North Carolina Senate and North Carolina House of Representatives
- James G. Exum, Chief Justice of the North Carolina Supreme Court and member of the North Carolina House of Representatives
- William C. Mims, Justice of the Supreme Court of Virginia, Attorney General of Virginia, Virginia Senate, and Virginia House of Delegates
- Hardy Myers, Attorney General of Oregon and Speaker of the Oregon House of Representatives
- Kenneth D. Schisler, Maryland House of Delegates and chair of the Maryland Public Service Commission
- William F. Winter, Governor of Mississippi, Lieutenant Governor of Mississippi, Treasurer of Mississippi, and Mississippi House of Representatives

== Sports ==
- Geary Eppley, University of Maryland athletic director
- Lance Parker, professional soccer player
- Mike Petri, rugby union player and coach

== Other ==
- Robert B. Patterson, founder of the first Citizens' Councils, a white supremacist organization
