= Jarzombek =

Jarzombek is a surname and may refer to:

- Bobby Jarzombek, American heavy metal /progressive metal drummer
- Charlie Jarzombek, American racecar driver
- Mark Jarzombek, American architectural historian, author and critic
- Ron Jarzombek, American guitarist
- Thomas Jarzombek (born 1973), German politician
