= Patricia Acampora =

American politician (born 1945)

Patricia L. Acampora

Chairman of the New York Public Service Commission
- In office December 2006 – January 2008
- Preceded by: William Flynn
- Succeeded by: Garry A. Brown

Member of the New York State Assembly from the 1st district
- In office January 1, 1993 – June 16, 2005
- Preceded by: Joseph Sawicki Jr.
- Succeeded by: Marc Alessi

Personal details
- Born: December 10, 1945 (age 80) Waukegan, Illinois, U.S.
- Party: Republican
- Spouse: Alan Croce
- Children: 2
- Education: Dowling College (BA)
- Occupation: politician

Patricia L. Acampora (born December 10, 1945) was appointed as a commissioner of the New York Public Service Commission (PSC) on June 16, 2005, by Gov. George Pataki, for a term ending on February 1, 2009. In December 2006, Pataki named Acampora to chair the PSC, a position she held until January 2008, when Gov. Eliot Spitzer appointed Garry A. Brown as chairman.

On February 9, 2009, Governor David A. Paterson announced the reappointment Acampora as a commissioner of the PSC, pending confirmation by the New York State Senate. Her new term expired on February 1, 2015, and her salary as a commissioner was at $109,800.

Acampora had previously served in the New York State Assembly for 12 years (1993 to 2005), representing the 1st Assembly District on Long Island. As an Assembly-woman, she was a Ranking Member of the Labor Committee; a member of the Consumer Affairs and Protection Committee; the Corporations, Authorities, and Commissions Committee; Banking Committee; and the Governmental Employees Committee.

From 1990 to 1993, Acampora worked as an assistant to the Suffolk County Executive. From 1989 to 1993, she also worked as an assistant to former State Assembly-man Joseph Sawicki Jr. She is a former member of the Nassau-Suffolk Juvenile Diabetes Board, and is currently a member of the East End Women's Network and the Capital Network Women's Group.

Acampora was raised and educated on Long Island, graduating from New Field High School in 1963 and attending Dowling College. She resides in Mattituck, New York. Her husband, Alan Croce, died in May 2025. Acampora has two grown daughters, two stepdaughters, and four grandchildren.

== Election results ==
- November 1998 general election, NYS Assembly, 1st AD

Patricia L. Acampora (REP - IND - CON - RTL)	...	26,100
Michael A. D'Arrigo (DEM)	...	10,665

- November 2000 general election, NYS Assembly, 1st AD

Patricia L. Acampora (REP - IND - CON)	...	37,347
Joseph A. Turdik (DEM)	...	14,705

- November 2002 general election, NYS Assembly, 1st AD

Patricia L. Acampora (REP - IND - CON - WOR)	...	28,895
Darren Johnson (DEM - LIB - GRE)	...	9,453
Barbara Keenan (RTL)	...	991

- November 2004 general election, NYS Assembly, 1st AD

Patricia L. Acampora (REP - IND - CON - WOR)	...	42,997
James McManmon (DEM)	...	19,630

New York State Assembly
Preceded by Joseph Sawicki	New York State Assembly, 1st District; 1993–2005	Succeeded by Marc Alessi
