= Long Island Spirits =

Coordinates: 40°57′22.5″N 72°45′11.2″W

Long Island Spirits Craft Distillery
- Company type: Distillery
- Founded: January 5, 2007
- Founder: Richard Stabile
- Headquarters: 2182 Sound Avenue, Baiting Hollow, NY 11933, USA
- Products: LiV Vodka, Sorbetta Liqueur, Pine Barrens Whisky
- Website: lispirits.com

Long Island Spirits is a microdistillery in Baiting Hollow, New York. Founded in 2007, it is the first craft distillery on Long Island since the 1800s. Surrounded by 5,000 acres of potato farms, Long Island Spirits is a full farm-to-bottle hand craft distillery operation.

== Products ==
=== LiV Vodka ===
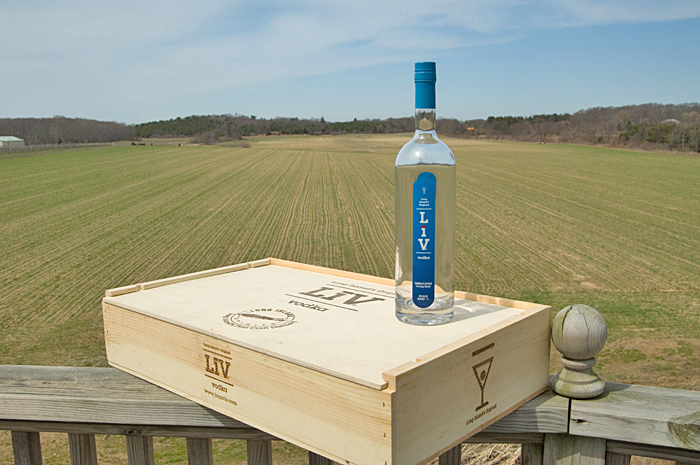
Vodka bottle and view of the farm

LiV is crafted using 100% sustainably and locally farmed marcy russet potatoes from Long Island, resulting in a gluten-free spirit. LiV is created using small batch pot and column distillation, bottling only the heart of the distillate.

=== Sorbetta ===
Sorbettas are the first potato-based liqueurs to be available in the United States. They are made micro-batches from the spirits of the company's vodka, combined with hand-peeled citrus fruit and locally-grown berries. Long Island Spirits offers five different flavored Sorbetta's; lemon, lime, orange, strawberry, and raspberry.

=== Pine Barrens Whisky ===
Pine Barrens is an American single malt whiskey crafted from a Barley Wine Styled Ale, and is the first to be distilled on Long Island. It is pot-distilled in small batches, then aged in charred American Oak casks.

=== Rough Rider Bourbon ===
Rough Rider is handcrafted by Long Island Spirits in a proprietary manner incorporating hand selected barrels of aged straight bourbon whisky, using local Long Island wine casks and a unique 180 proof brandy "cask finishing wash". The bourbon starts out as a highly refined mash bill, consisting of 60% corn, 35% rye, and 5% malted barley, and is aged for several years in charred new American white oak barrels.

== Awards Received ==
- Double Gold - Best Domestic Vodka 2012- The Fifty Best
- Gold – San Francisco Spirits Competition 2012 - SF Spirits Comp 2012
- Gold – NY International Spirits Competition 2011 - NYISC
- Riverhead Chamber of Commerce Agricultural Green Key Award - Riverhead News Review

== Media coverage ==
=== LiV Vodka ===
- NY Times 2008

=== Pine Barrens Whisky ===
- NY Times 2012
- Riverhead News Review 2012
