= Marc Alessi =

American lawyer, entrepreneur, and politician

Marc S. Alessi

Member of the New York State Assembly from the 1st district
- In office September 2005 – December 2010
- Preceded by: Patricia L. Acampora
- Succeeded by: Daniel Losquadro

Personal details
- Born: Marc Steven Alessi; July 1976 (age 49–50) Brooklyn, New York, U.S.
- Party: Democratic
- Spouse: Gretchen
- Children: 3
- Education: SUNY Albany (BA); Touro Law Center (JD)
- Profession: Entrepreneur
- Website: Official website

Marc Steven Alessi (born July 1976) is an American attorney and entrepreneur from Shoreham, New York, who formerly served in the New York State Assembly. He currently holds positions as executive director of Tesla Science Center at Wardenclyffe, Executive Director of the Business Incubator Association of New York State, Founder/CEO of SynchroPET, and attorney at the firm of Campolo, Middleton & McCormick LLP.

Alessi was born in Brooklyn, New York, and grew up on Long Island. His father, a union printer, emigrated from Italy at the age of nine, and his mother worked and raised six children.

Alessi graduated from SUNY Albany in 1998 with a B.A. in Political Science. He received his J.D. from Touro College Jacob D. Fuchsberg Law Center in 2003 and was admitted to the New York State Bar Association in 2005. Alessi was of counsel with the law firm Jaspan Schlesinger LLP in Garden City, New York, from 2007 to 2015.

Alessi represented the state's 1st district from 2005 to 2010. The district comprised Brookhaven, Riverhead, Southold and Shelter Island. He was chosen to fill this seat, formerly occupied by Patricia Acampora, in a special election held on September 13, 2005. He won re-election in 2006 and 2008 but lost his bid for a third full term in November 2010, defeated by Republican Daniel Losquadro. Prior to his election, Alessi served as the Downstate Director of Intergovernmental Affairs within the Office of the New York State Comptroller from 2001 to 2005.

In 2012 Alessi founded and became the CEO of SynchroPET, a biomedical device company in Ronkonkoma, New York, that manufactures MRI-compatible PET (Positron Emission Tomography) devices for the small animal research and clinical/human imaging markets.

From June 2015 to the present, Alessi has served as counsel to Campolo, Middleton & McCormick, LLP, a full-service law firm established in 2008 that is currently has four offices across Long Island, New York, with clients that range from global corporations to individuals.

He resides in Shoreham, New York, with his wife Gretchen and their daughter and two sons.

== Election results ==
- September 2005 special election, NYS Assembly, 1st AD

Marc Alessi (DEM - IND - WOR)	...	6,239
Michael J. Caracciolo (REP - CON)	...	5,705

- November 2006 general election, NYS Assembly, 1st AD

Marc S. Alessi (DEM - IND - WOR)	...	24,366
Daniel J. Panico (REP - CON - STR)	...	15,446

- November 2008 general election, NYS Assembly, 1st AD

Marc S. Alessi (DEM - IND - WOR)	...	36,680
James M. Staudenraus (REP - CON)	...	24,095

- November 2010 general election, NYS Assembly, 1st AD

Daniel P. Losquadro (REP - CON - STR)	...	23,860
Marc S. Alessi (DEM - IND - WOR)	...	22,943

New York State Assembly
Preceded by Patricia L. Acampora	New York State Assembly, 1st District; 2005–2010	Succeeded by Daniel P. Losquadro
