= Touro Law Center =

Law school in Central Islip, New York, US

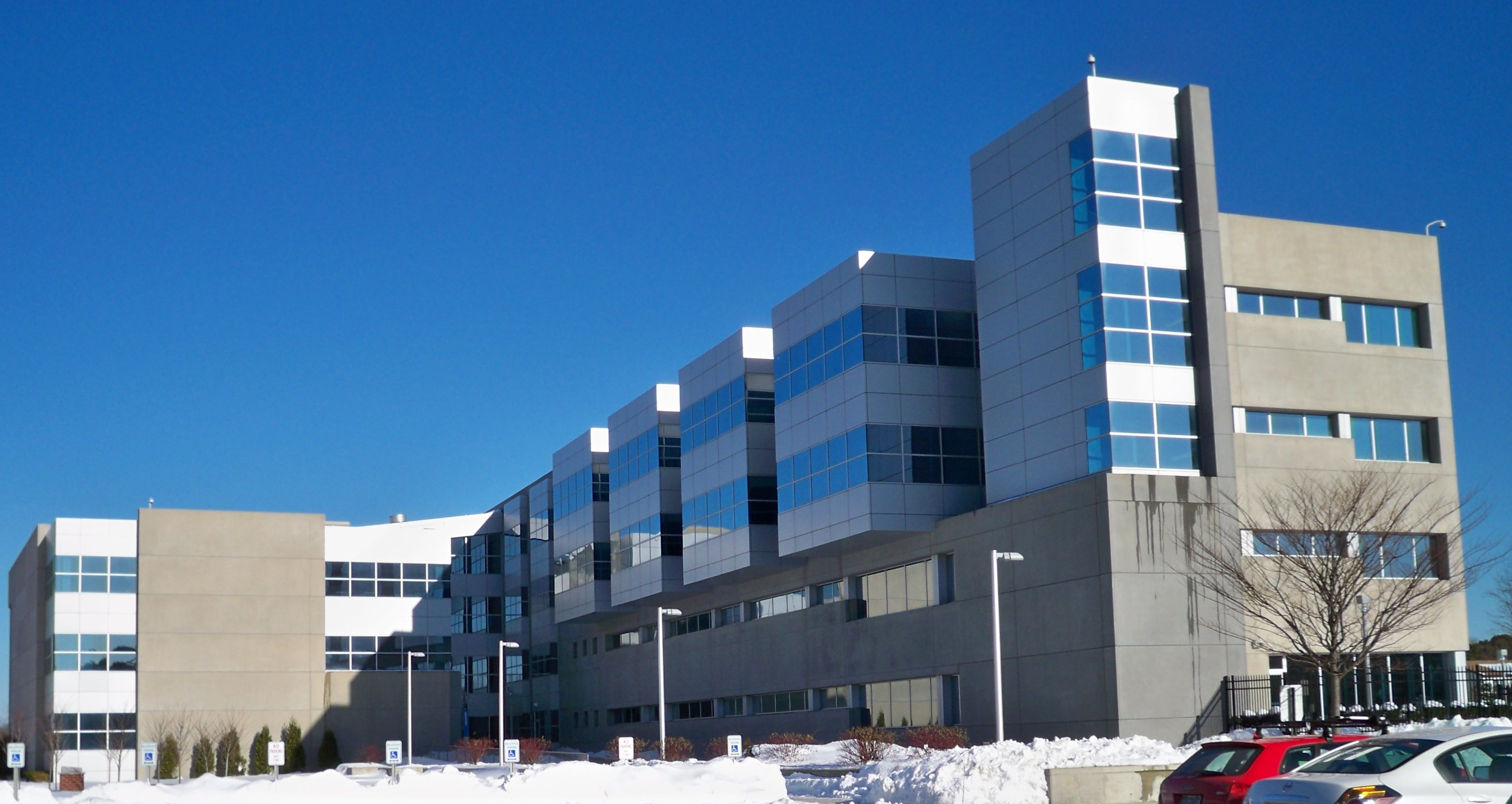
- Parent school: Touro University
- Religious affiliation: Jewish
- Established: 1980
- School type: Private
- Dean: Elena B. Langan
- Location: Central Islip, New York, United States; 40.762°N 73.187738°W
- Enrollment: 595 (total)
- Faculty: 94 total, 36 full time
- USNWR ranking: 167 (2023–2024)
- Bar pass rate: 70.1% (2020 first time takers)
- Website: www.tourolaw.edu

Touro University Jacob D. Fuchsberg Law Center, commonly known as Touro Law Center, is an ABA accredited law school. It is located on Long Island, New York, in the hamlet of Central Islip. The Law Center is part of Touro University, a private, not-for-profit, coeducational institution based in New York City.

Touro Law Center has 36 full-time faculty members and 58 teaching adjunct faculty. Of the Touro graduates who took the New York bar for the first time in 2020, 70.7% passed, vs. an overall average of 85.7%.

== Campus ==
Touro Law Center is the only law school in Suffolk County, New York. After briefly beginning operations in Manhattan, the Law Center's first campus was established in the town of Huntington, which is located in northwestern Suffolk County. In 2007, the Law Center moved to its current campus in Central Islip. The Central Islip campus, consisting of a four-story, 180,000-square-foot building, is located within walking distance of both the Alfonse M. D’Amato United States Courthouse and the John P. Cohalan State Court Complex, in which the Suffolk County District and Family Courts and the New York State Supreme Court sit.

== Programs ==
=== Curriculum ===
Students may enroll in either a program to earn a Juris Doctor (JD) degree or a Master of Laws (LLM) degree. Both full-time and part-time programs are available to students in the JD program.

Touro Law Center is one of several law schools in New York State to offer a two-year accelerated JD program, in which accepted students fulfill their credit-requirements of study within 24 months, beginning with the summer of their first year, and sit for a Bar Examination 26 months after they begin their law school studies. In addition, Touro Law Center offers an accelerated JD program, referred to as a "three-plus-three" (BA/JD) program, with the University of Central Florida, and an accelerated JD Program which allows graduates of foreign law schools to earn a J.D. degree in two years.

Touro Law Center offers four concentrations for J.D. candidates, an L.L.M program for U.S. law school graduates and a Master of Laws in U.S. Legal Studies for foreign law graduates, and joint J.D./M.B.A, J.D./M.P.A., and J.D./M.S.W. programs with Touro College, State University of New York at Stony Brook, and LIU-Post.

Touro Law Center has at times offered summer programs in Vietnam, Germany, Croatia, China, India, and Israel. Only the Vietnam program was offered for the summer of 2018. In 2011, when the Vietnam program was first offered, Touro Law Center was the only law school to offer such a program within the borders of Vietnam.

=== Experiential learning programs ===
In September 2013, Touro Law Center joined the Educating Tomorrow's Lawyers Consortium, which consisted of 31 ABA-accredited law schools that have demonstrated a commitment to innovation in legal education and offer a number of law school courses "that implement a student-centered approach to legal education". The consortium was dissolved in 2017. In 2013, PreLaw Magazine recognized Touro Law Center as one of six law schools in the nation offering innovative clinical and experiential learning opportunities, highlighting the law school's ProBono Uncontested Divorce Project. Touro Law Center is also a member of the Alliance for Experiential Learning in Law, an alliance that currently has 113 law school and legal service organization members, which was established in 2011 with the goal of integrating experience-based education into the traditional law school curriculum.

In Fall 2006, the Law Center began a pilot program that required all first year students to observe courtroom practice in both the federal Alfonse M. D’Amato United States Courthouse and the John P. Cohalan State Court Complex. In 2009, the Center for Court Innovation issued a report on its three-year study of the pilot program; the report concluded that consideration should be given to expanding the program either through increased observation opportunities or participation of students beyond their first year of law school. As of 2011, the program is a graduation requirement in which all first year students must participate, and upper-level students have the option of continuing the curriculum through coursework and court externships, clerkships, or pro bono projects.

=== Clinics and Centers ===
Touro Law Center's clinical program consists of legal clinics that specialize in the areas of:

- Bankruptcy & Mortgage Foreclosure
- Criminal Law (State Defense/Prosecution & Federal Prosecution)
- Disaster Relief
- Education and Youth Justice Clinic
- Elder Law
- Family Law
- Immigration Law
- Small Business and Not-for-Profit Law
- Veterans' and Servicemembers' Rights

Touro Law Center also hosts the following Institutes and Centers:

- Aging and Longevity Law Institute
- Center for Innovation in Business, Law & Technology
- Institute of Land Use and Sustainable Development Law
- Jewish Law Institute
- TLC Heart (TLC – Hurricane Emergency Assistance and Referral Team)
- International Justice Center for Post-Graduate Development

The International Justice Center for Post–Graduate Development serves as a national clearinghouse for the law-school based incubator movement. Led by Fred Rooney, the Center launched Touro's Community Justice Center in 2013, housing eight-ten start-up law firms owned by Touro alumni.

The William Randolph Hearst William Randolph Hearst Public Advocacy Center (PAC), established in 2007, has 14 offices and houses on-campus non-profit legal service providers such as the Nassau/Suffolk Law Services Committee, Inc. (grant recipient of the Legal Services Corporation), New York Civil Liberties Union, and the Empire Justice Center (member of the Consumer Federation of America); there are also additional off-campus member affiliates. Thomas Maligno has served as the Executive Director of the Public Advocacy Center since it opened.

== History ==
Touro Law Center was established and admitted its first class in the Fall of 1980. The first class graduated in Spring 1983, and in that same year, the Law Center was provisionally accredited by the American Bar Association. It began operations in a building located at 30 West 44th Street in Manhattan, New York City, which is now the home of the Penn Club of New York. In 1982, the law school moved to the town of Huntington in Suffolk County, New York and the building it occupied for twenty years, formerly Toaz Junior High School. At the time of its move to Huntington, Touro Law Center was the only law school on Long Island to offer a part-time program to students. In April 1986, the Law Center was officially named the Touro College Jacob D. Fuchsberg Law Center, in honor of Judge Jacob D. Fuchsberg, who served as an associate judge of the New York State Court of Appeals from 1975 to 1983. Judge Fuchsberg began serving on the Board of Trustees of Touro College at the time it was established in the 1970s, and during his tenure on the Board, he advocated for the establishment, accreditation, and growth of the Law Center. The Law Center achieved full accreditation by the American Bar Association in 1989.

=== Deans ===
John S. Bainbridge was the dean of the law school from 1982 to 1985. During his tenure, Bainbridge recruited the founding faculty and administrators and guided the school through the first American Bar Association inspection that led to its provisional national accreditation. Howard A. Glickstein served as the dean of the Law Center from 1986 to 2004. During Glickstein's tenure, the Law Center was accepted as a member of the American Association of Law Schools, which occurred in 1994. During his eighteen-year tenure, Glickstein also oversaw the initial plans for the Central Islip, New York campus and the development of the construction project. Construction on the new campus began in March 2005, shortly after Glickstein's tenure ended. From 2004 to 2012, Lawrence Raful served as dean. During Raful's tenure, the construction of the Central Islip campus took place, opening in 2007. In 2012, Patricia Salkin was appointed the dean of the law school. She served until 2016, when she was promoted to the position of provost of graduate and professional studies for the Touro College and University system. Harry Ballan, senior counsel at Davis Polk & Wardwell, LLP was subsequently appointed to the position. In June 2019, Elena B. Langan was announced as the new dean of the law school, having previously served as dean of Concordia Law School and interim dean of Nova Southeastern University's Shepard Broad College of Law.

== Legal scholarship & publications ==
In May 2014, Touro Law Center was identified by one law school rankings system as the 13th "most undervalued" law school in the country, based on the spread between the Law Center's U.S. News peer reputation and the number of downloads from the Social Science Research Network of Touro law faculty scholarship. This particular system, first established in a law review article in 2006 by two law professors, compares the U.S. News Rankings to scholarly impact as measured by download counts from the Social Science Research Network. In 2013, Touro Law Center launched its SSRN Legal Studies Research Paper Series eJournal.

The students and faculty of Touro Law Center currently publish four journals:

- Touro Law Review (first published Spring 1985)
- Touro International Law Review (formerly known as the Touro Journal of Transnational Law; first published Fall 1988)
- Journal of Race, Gender, and Ethnicity (first published August 2006)
- Journal of Experiential Learning (first published Fall 2014)

== Employment ==
According to Touro's 2018 ABA-required disclosures, 67.9% of the Class of 2016 had obtained full-time, long-term, JD-required employment by nine months after graduation. Touro Law Center's Law School Transparency under-employment score for the Class of 2017 is 20.3%, indicating the percentage of the Class of 2017 unemployed, pursuing an additional degree, or working in a non-professional, short-term, or part-time job nine months after graduation. For the graduating class of 2021, Touro's LST employment score of 59.1% is the lowest of any law school in New York state.

== Costs ==
The cost in tuition and fees for attending Touro Law Center full-time for the 2018–19 academic year is $24,900 per semester and $18,605 per semester for part-time programs.

== Notable faculty ==
- Joseph Frank Bianco – Appointed by President George W. Bush as a US District Judge in the Eastern District of New York; teaches National Security and the Law.
- Sol Wachtler – Former Chief Judge of New York Court of Appeals; Distinguished Adjunct Professor.

== Notable alumni ==
- Dan Frisa - U.S. House of Representatives, New York's 4th congressional district, 1994-1996
- Kathleen M. Rice (1991) – U.S. House of Representatives, New York's 4th congressional district, November 2014-2022
- Sal Iacono (1996) – comedian, writer and game show host; best known for his roles on The Man Show and the late night television show Jimmy Kimmel Live!
- Gata Kamsky (2004) – chess grandmaster, and a former World Rapid Chess Champion
- Bikram Singh (musician) – housing attorney; said to be the most famous Bhangra fusion star in North America according to the New York Times
- Martin Tankleff (2014) – activist
- Bradley Blakeman (1986) – Fox News contributor; former Senior Advisor to President George W. Bush; Georgetown University politics professor
- Gabriel Silva Marques (2014) – former Deputy Nassau County Comptroller, member of the Portuguese Government's Diaspora Advisory Council (Conselho das Comunidades Portuguesas).
- Joseph Addabbo Jr. (1992) – New York State Senator, 15th Senate district
- John J. Flanagan (1990) – former New York State Senator, 2nd Senate district
- Al Graf (2002) – former New York State Assemblyman, 5th Assembly district
- Marc Alessi (2003) – former New York State Assemblyman, 1st Assembly district
- Kenneth LaValle (1987) – former New York State Senator, 1st Senate district
- Sam Nunberg (2009) – former campaign advisor to Donald Trump
- Don Self - Prison Break character

== See also ==
- List of Jewish universities and colleges in the United States
- Law of New York
