= Joe Sawicki =

American politician

Member of the New York State Assembly from the 1st district
- In office January 1, 1983 – September 15, 1993
- Preceded by: New seat (redistricting)
- Succeeded by: Patricia Acampora

Personal details
- Born: 1955 (age 70–71)
- Party: Republican
- Other political affiliations: Right to Life
- Parent: Joseph Sawicki Sr. (father)
- Profession: Accountant, Auditor
- Known for: Long Island secession

Joseph Sawicki Jr. is an American politician from Long Island, New York who served in the New York State Assembly as a Republican before going on to lead a Long Island secessionist movement.

== Biography ==
=== Early life ===
Sawicki was born in 1955 to Joseph H. Sawicki Sr. the former Chief of Police of Southold. Before entering politics Sawicki worked as an accountant and auditor for Peat, Marwick, Mitchell and Co of Garden City.

=== Political career ===
Sawicki's political career started in 1979 when he was named Deputy Suffolk County Comptroller under Joseph Caputo. In 1982, the state legislature created a new 1st Assembly district encompassing the North Fork of Long Island, and Caputo ran, winning an upset against Southold Town Supervisor William Pell. The Conservative Party of New York State refused to endorse Sawicki, instead endorsing the Democrat Pell, however, Sawicki did win the endorsement of the New York State Right to Life Party. In 1993 Sawicki resigned from the state assembly a few months before the end of his term to become comptroller and chief financial officer for betting off-track at the Suffolk Downs. Sawicki said he did so to be closer to his family, and because he had stopped enjoying his time as an assemblyman.

In 2002 Sawicki ran for County Comptroller against Democratic and Working Family candidate Jordan Wilson. Sawicki would leave office as Comptroller in 2014 after being term limited. In 2011 Sawicki announced that he was considering running for county executive to replace Steve Levy. However, he would ultimately take his name out of the running shortly after.

In 2015 Sawicki was hired by the newly elected Democratic county executive Steve Bellone to serve as the assistant deputy police commissioner for finance. Also in 2015 the Suffolk Republican Party floated Sawicki as a possible candidate for the last county treasurer before the office was abolished in 2018.

=== Long Island secessionist ===
In the 1990s, while in the state assembly, Sawicki proposed a bill that would have Long Island split from New York to become the 51st state. Sawicki argued that Long Island, despite making up just 15% of the state's population was unfairly paying 20% of the state's estate taxes and 17% of the state's income taxes. In 2008 Sawicki returned to the Long Island secessionist cause full-time.

In 2009 Sawicki endorsed a feasibility study of statehood for Long Island called for by fellow Republicans; State Senator Kenneth LaValle and Assemblyman Fred Thiele Jr. The main reason this study was proposed was due to a $1.5 billion payroll tax imposed by the Legislature to help bail out the Metropolitan Transportation Authority. In 2010 Sawicki and Democrat William J. Lindsay petitioned Nassau County to coordinate efforts for statehood with Suffolk and called for a bi-county commission to study the feasibility of Nassau and Suffolk seceding from New York. In 2015 Sawicki again proposed Long Island separate as a new state, saying that the region receives only $5.2 billion in state payments, but pays $8.1 billion to the state.

== Personal life ==
Joseph has a brother William who followed in their father's footsteps and became a lieutenant for the Southold Police Department, as well as a sister Lisa who moved to Atlanta.
