= Howard A. Glickstein =

Howard A. Glickstein is an attorney, legal scholar, educator, and Dean Emeritus of Touro Law Center in Central Islip, New York. Dean Glickstein is a former president of the Society of American Law Teachers and a member of the New York, and Washington DC bars, as well as the United States Supreme Court bar. A graduate of Yale Law School, Dean Glickstein began his legal career at a prestigious labor law firm in New York.

After working in private practice, Dean Glickstein entered the public sector serving as a Staff Attorney in the Civil Rights Division of the United States Department of Justice. As a member of the Appeals and Research Department, Dean Glickstein assisted in the drafting of the Civil Rights Act of 1964 and the Voting Rights Act of 1965. As his career progressed, Dean Glickstein served as General Counsel, and, subsequently Staff Director on the U.S. Commission on Civil Rights

After his tenure with the federal government, Dean Glickstein entered academia as an adjunct Professor and Director of the Notre Dame Center for Civil Rights at Notre Dame Law School. Dean Glickstein also worked at Howard University School of Law as the Director of the Equal Employment Litigation Clinic.

Dean Glickstein was appointed Dean of the University of Bridgeport School of Law in 1980, and served in that position until 1985. During his tenure, Dean Glickstein oversaw the American Bar Association Accreditation Process and secured membership in the Association of American Law Schools for the institution. After his time at Bridgeport, Dean Glickstein served as Dean of Touro Law Center in New York from 1986 until his retirement in 2004. Dean Glickstein was, again, successful in securing full American Bar Association Accreditation and membership in The Association of American Law Schools for his new institution.
