= Jodi Giglio =

New York politician (born 1968)

Member of the New York State Assembly from the 2nd district
- Incumbent
- Assumed office January 5, 2021
- Preceded by: Anthony Palumbo

Personal details
- Born: June 2, 1968 (age 58) Syosset, New York, U.S.
- Party: Republican
- Children: 3
- Education: Stony Brook University (1994–2002)
- Occupation: Land use and construction
- Website: Campaign website Official website

Jodi A. Giglio is an American politician from the state of New York. A Republican, Giglio has represented the 2nd District in the New York State Assembly since January 5, 2021. Her district is located on eastern Long Island.

== Career ==
Giglio owns a construction management company.

Giglio's first political position was on the town board of Riverhead, New York, elected in 2009 and 2013. She was nominated by the Republican Party in 2015 for supervisor but was defeated in the general election, then re-elected in 2017 to a term-limited third and final term as councilwoman.

As a Riverhead councilwoman, Giglio called on New York State Governor Andrew Cuomo to relax social distancing restrictions on catering businesses in October 2020, wishing to allow venues to open at 50% capacity and hold events such as sweet 16s and weddings, after a number of bars and restaurants had their liquor licenses suspended for violations.

Beginning her term as assemblywoman, Giglio planned to push a COVID-19 pandemic recovery plan, correct bail reform, adopt a farmers' rights act, restore state funding for schools and hospitals, and authorize infrastructure projects. She also aimed to waive penalties and interest for late property taxes during the pandemic, and plan for Long Island's waste management after the expected 2024 closure of the Brookhaven landfill.

Giglio was one of several politicians from the East End of Long Island to speak out against Andrew Cuomo after the allegations that he sexually harassed multiple women. Giglio called for Cuomo to step down, stating that "No one should suffer the systemic and frankly disgusting sexual harassment that the governor enagaged in." Giglio called for an independent investigation to be set up by New York State Attorney General Letitia James, calling the accusations disturbing and saying that people should feel safe in the workplace.

New York State Assembly
Preceded by Anthony Palumbo	Member of the New York Assembly from the 2nd District; 2021–present	Incumbent
