= Garry A. Brown (politician) =

American politician

Garry A. Brown was the chairman of the New York Public Service Commission (PSC) from January 2008 to October 2013. He was named to the post in January 2008 by Governor of New York Eliot Spitzer to succeed outgoing Chairwoman Patricia Acampora. He was replaced by Audrey Zibelman.

The PSC regulates all telecommunications and utilities in New York. Previously, Brown was Vice President of External Affairs at the New York Independent System Operator, a not-for-profit company that manages New York's electricity transmission grid and oversees New York's wholesale electricity markets, and a senior policy analyst for the New York State Energy Office.
