= Chris Murray (American politician) =

American politician

Member-elect of the New York State Senate from the 1st district
- Assuming office January 2027
- Succeeding: Anthony Palumbo

Personal details
- Born: Edmund Christopher Murray
- Party: Democratic

Edmund Christopher Murray is an American politician. A member of the Democratic Party, he is the member-elect for the 1st district of the New York State Senate. He defeated incumbent Senator Anthony Palumbo in the 2026 state senate election. He will be the first democrat the represent New York's 1st State Senate District since at least 1914.
