= Charlie Jarzombek =

American racing driver (1942-1987)

- Born: September 30, 1942; Baiting Hollow, New York, U.S.
- Died: March 22, 1987 (aged 44); Martinsville, Virginia, U.S.
- Cause of death: Basilar skull fracture cause by racing accident
- Years active: 1962–1987

Charles Vincent Jarzombek Sr. (September 30, 1942 – March 22, 1987) was an American racecar driver from Baiting Hollow, New York.

== Racing career ==
Jarzombek started racing in 1962 on the Long Island tracks of Islip Speedway, Riverhead Raceway and Freeport Stadium. He won on Long Island and other tracks throughout the years.

Jarzombek won 187 feature events at 16 different racetracks from Massachusetts to Florida in his career. Career race win highlights include winning the 1986 Icebreaker at Thompson International Speedway. He won the 1985 Stafford Speedway Modified Championship. He also raced on the NASCAR Whelen Modified Tour (then known as the NASCAR Winston Modified Series). Jarzombek drove modifieds at Waterford-New London and Plainville, as well as southern tracks including Wall Stadium, Martinsville, Trenton and New Smyrna.

== Death and memorials ==
Jarzombek died from injuries sustained in a racing accident, when his throttle appeared to hang, at Martinsville Speedway during the March 22, 1987 event.

Jarzombek was inducted posthumously into the Suffolk Sports Hall of Fame in the Auto Racing Category with the Class of 1995. He was inducted posthumously in the New England Auto Racers Hall of Fame in 2004.

For many years at Riverhead Raceway in New York State, the NASCAR Whelen Modified Tour would run one extra lap in their feature races in his memory.
