= Gabriel Marques (attorney) =

American attorney (born 1983)

Gabriel S. Marques
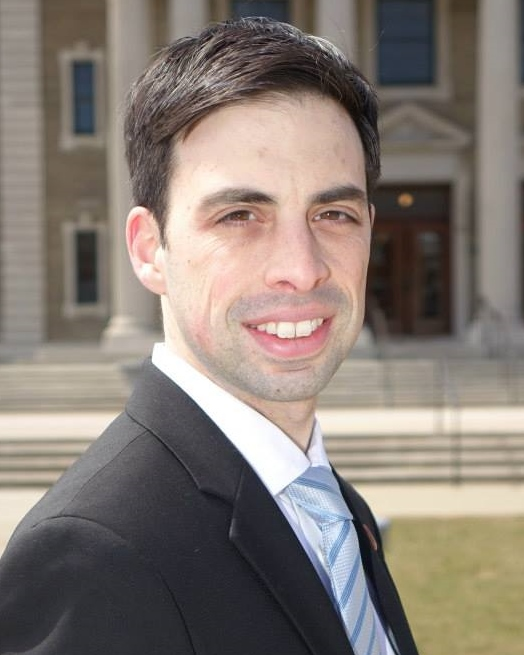
- Born: 1983; Mineola, New York
- Education: Hofstra University, (BBA, MBA); Touro Law Center (JD)
- Occupation: Attorney

Gabriel S. Marques is an American attorney. Marques currently serves as the fiscal officer of Nassau County, New York and as an adjunct professor at Molloy College. He is also a member of the Conselho das Comunidades Portuguesas, a diaspora advisory council of the Portuguese government, and the current president of the National Organization of Portuguese Americans.

== Early life ==
Marques received B.B.A. and M.B.A. degrees in finance from the Frank G. Zarb School of Business at Hofstra University, where he was a member of the Phi Eta Sigma honor society and the Hofstra University Honors College. In 2014, Marques received his Juris Doctor from Touro Law Center.

== Career ==
Marques started his career in government in 2010 as a research analyst, before being appointed Deputy Comptroller of Nassau County in 2015. He has served as Nassau County's Fiscal Officer in the Office of the Comptroller since 2016. He is also an adjunct professor at Molloy College.

In 2012, Marques organized the first recognition of Portugal Day in Nassau County by hosting the Portugal Day Celebration at the Nassau County Legislative Chambers. The event has since been held annually (renamed the New York Portugal Day Gala).

Marques was a member of the U.S. Delegation for the annual summit of international Portuguese diaspora leaders in Lisbon in May 2015, and was president of the Regional Advisory Council on Portuguese Communities in North America from 2016-17. In 2018, he co-founded the Portuguese American Bar Association. On February 21, 2019, Marques was elected president of the National Organization of Portuguese Americans.

== Honors ==
- Knight Commander of the Royal Equestrian and Military Order of Saint Michael of the Wing (House of Braganza, Portugal; May 11, 2019).
- "40 Under 40." Long Island Business News (February 7, 2019).
- "Key to the Village of Mineola," awarded by Mayor Scott Strauss (2011).
