= Fred Thiele =

American politician

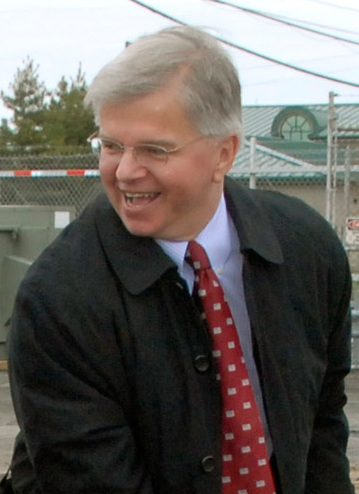
- Thiele in 2009

Member of the New York State Assembly
- In office February 15, 1995 – December 31, 2024
- Preceded by: John L. Behan
- Succeeded by: T. John Schiavoni
- Constituency: 2nd district (1995–2012); 1st district (2013–2024)

Personal details
- Born: August 8, 1953 (age 72) Southampton, New York, U.S.
- Party: Democratic (2022–present)
- Other political affiliations: Republican (1982–2009); Alliance (2020–2021, national); Independence (2009–2022, statewide)
- Education: Long Island University (BA); Albany Law School (JD)
- Website: Assembly website

Frederick W. Thiele Jr. (born August 8, 1953) is an American politician who served in the New York State Assembly from the 1st district from 2013 to 2024 and the 2nd district from 1995 to 2012. Thiele was originally elected as a member of the Republican Party, but switched to the Independence Party of New York in 2009. He joined the Democratic Party after the Independence Party lost its ballot position.

== Political career ==
Thiele began his political career as counsel to former Assemblyman John L. Behan, a position in which he served until 1982. Subsequent to his service as a legislative assistant he became Southampton Town Attorney and East Hampton Town Planning Board Attorney, from 1982 to 1987 and 1982 to 1986 respectively.

In 1987, Thiele won a bid to represent the 16th District within the Suffolk County Legislature, a position he would hold for the subsequent four years. After serving in the Suffolk County Legislature he would go on to be elected as Southampton town supervisor, where he would serve until winning a 1995 special election to succeed his former boss in the State Assembly.

Although elected as a Republican, after being elected to the Suffolk County Legislature, he joined the chamber's nine Democrats to elect a Democrat as presiding officer.

== New York Assembly ==
In 1995, Republican Governor George Pataki appointed Assemblyman John L. Behan as New York State Commissioner of Veterans' Affairs. Behan resigned from the New York Assembly, leaving a vacant seat in the 2nd District. Thiele ran for the seat and defeated Democratic nominee Leo Davis 69%–28% in the March 1995 special election.

He won re-election to his first full term with 62% of the vote. Between 1998 and 2006, he never won re-election with less than 59% of the vote. In 2008, he defeated Democratic nominee Michael Pitcher 62%–38%. He won re-election for the first time as a member of the Independence Party, defeating Republican nominee Richard A. Blumenthal 59%–41%.

Thiele announced on October 1, 2009, that he was joining the Independence Party, saying the Republicans no longer stood for "pocketbook issues" and was given permission to caucus with the Democratic supermajority along with the other Independence Party assemblyman, Timothy P. Gordon Thiele, the only Independent in the Assembly, supports an open primary in New York State and supported Bernie Sanders in the 2016 Democratic Primary. Before his switch, Thiele had been ranking minority member on the Assembly Education Committee and vice chairman of the Assembly Minority Joint Conference Committee.

Thiele was a member of the Democratic Party during his time in college. In 2022, he left the Independence Party after it lost its automatic ballot line and joined the Democratic Party.

He currently sits on the House Committee on Local Governments as Chair, House Committee on Future of the Long Island Power Authority, House Committee on Rules, House Committee on Environmental Conservation, House Committee on Oversight, Analysis and Investigation, and House Committee on Transportation.

In February 2024, Thiele announced that he would not seek re-election to the Assembly. He was succeeded in the 2024 election by Democrat T. John Schiavoni.

== Personal life ==
Thiele is a native of Sag Harbor, New York, and graduated from Pierson Middle-High School in 1971. He graduated from Southampton College of Long Island University in 1976 with a B.A. summa cum laude in political science and history. Thiele received a Juris Doctor degree from Albany Law School in 1979 and was admitted to the bar in New York in 1980.

Thiele resides in Sag Harbor. He has a daughter and two sons.

== Electoral history ==
Fred Thiele electoral history

1989 Suffolk County Legislature district 16 election
Party	Candidate	Votes	%
Republican	Fred Thiele (incumbent)	16,225	74.31%
Democratic	Roger E. Cullen	5,609	25.69%
Total votes		21,834	100.00%

1991 Southampton Supervisor election
Party	Candidate	Votes	%
Independent	Fred Thiele	5,944	45.11%
Republican	George S. Stavropoulos (incumbent)	4,384	33.27%
Democratic	Ronald J. Moss	2,268	17.21%
Conservative	John D. Eckart	582	4.42%
Total votes		13,178	100.00%

1995 New York State Assembly district 2 special election
Party	Candidate	Votes	%
Republican	Fred Thiele	5,758	68.92%
Democratic	Leo P. Davis	2,326	27.84%
Right to Life	Valerie A. Hegelan	271	3.24%
Total votes		8,355	100.00%

1996 New York State Assembly district 2 general election
Party	Candidate	Votes	%
Republican	Fred Thiele (incumbent)	23,931	55.09%
Independence	Fred Thiele (incumbent)	2,960	6.81%
Total	Fred Thiele (incumbent)	26,891	61.90%
Democratic	Melissa A. Walton	13,424	30.90%
Conservative	Margaret А. Eckart	1,977	4.55%
Right to Life	Michael J. Bradley	1,149	2.64%
Total votes		43,441	100.00%

1998 New York State Assembly district 2 general election
Party	Candidate	Votes	%
Republican	Fred Thiele (incumbent)	19,203	55.26%
Independence	Fred Thiele (incumbent)	1,592	4.58%
Total	Fred Thiele (incumbent)	20,795	59.85%
Democratic	Melissa A. Walton	10,404	29.94%
Conservative	Marie F. Mulcahy	2,270	6.53%
Right to Life	Marie F. Mulcahy	1,279	3.68%
Total	Marie F. Mulcahy	3,549	10.21%
Total votes		34,748	100.00%

2000 New York State Assembly district 2 general election
Party	Candidate	Votes	%
Republican	Fred Thiele (incumbent)	28,948	60.17%
Democratic	Kevin R. Mitchell	15,814	32.87%
Independence	Kevin R. Mitchell	771	1.60%
Total	Kevin R. Mitchell	16,585	34.48%
Conservative	Marie F. Mulcahy	1,864	3.87%
Green	Van Buren D. Howell	710	1.48%
Total votes		48,107	100.00%

2002 New York State Assembly district 2 general election
Party	Candidate	Votes	%
Republican	Fred Thiele (incumbent)	20,066	59.29%
Independence	Fred Thiele (incumbent)	2,681	7.92%
Working Families	Fred Thiele (incumbent)	567	1.68%
Total	Fred Thiele (incumbent)	23,314	68.89%
Democratic	Kevin R. Mitchell	8,625	25.48%
Conservative	Patricia A. Guarino	1,142	3.37%
Right to Life	Robert Colapinto	763	2.25%
Total votes		33,844	100.00%

2004 New York State Assembly district 2 general election
Party	Candidate	Votes	%
Republican	Fred Thiele (incumbent)	28,963	52.66%
Independence	Fred Thiele (incumbent)	3,297	5.99%
Working Families	Fred Thiele (incumbent)	1,255	2.28%
Total	Fred Thiele (incumbent)	33,515	60.93%
Democratic	M. Treewolf West	19,789	35.98%
Conservative	Patricia A. Guarino	1,699	3.09%
Total votes		55,003	100.00%

2006 New York State Assembly district 2 general election
Party	Candidate	Votes	%
Republican	Fred Thiele (incumbent)	16,754	47.29%
Independence	Fred Thiele (incumbent)	2,453	6.92%
Conservative	Fred Thiele (incumbent)	1,771	5.00%
Total	Fred Thiele (incumbent)	20,978	59.21%
Democratic	M. Treewolf West	13,556	38.26%
Working Families	M. Treewolf West	893	2.52%
Total	M. Treewolf West	14,449	40.79%
Total votes		35,427	100.00%

2008 New York State Assembly district 2 general election
Party	Candidate	Votes	%
Republican	Fred Thiele (incumbent)	24,987	47.33%
Independence	Fred Thiele (incumbent)	3,034	5.82%
Conservative	Fred Thiele (incumbent)	2,576	4.94%
Working Families	Fred Thiele (incumbent)	1,779	3.41%
Total	Fred Thiele (incumbent)	32,376	62.06%
Democratic	William M. Pitcher	19,793	37.94%
Total votes		52,169	100.00%

2010 New York State Assembly district 2 general election
Party	Candidate	Votes	%
Democratic	Fred Thiele (incumbent)	18,589	47.08%
Independence	Fred Thiele (incumbent)	3,208	8.13%
Working Families	Fred Thiele (incumbent)	1,634	4.14%
Total	Fred Thiele (incumbent)	23,431	59.35%
Republican	Richard A. Blumenthal	12,856	32.56%
Conservative	Richard A. Blumenthal	3,180	8.05%
Total	Richard A. Blumenthal	16,036	40.62%
Write-in		14	0.04%
Total votes		39,481	100.00%

2012 New York State Assembly district 1 general election
Party	Candidate	Votes	%
Democratic	Fred Thiele (incumbent)	29,761	77.43%
Independence	Fred Thiele (incumbent)	4,228	11.00%
Working Families	Fred Thiele (incumbent)	4,156	10.81%
Total	Fred Thiele (incumbent)	38,145	99.25%
Write-in		290	0.75%
Total votes		38,435	100.00%

2014 New York State Assembly district 1 general election
Party	Candidate	Votes	%
Democratic	Fred Thiele (incumbent)	16,219	49.20%
Independence	Fred Thiele (incumbent)	2,162	6.56%
Working Families	Fred Thiele (incumbent)	1,575	4.78%
Total	Fred Thiele (incumbent)	19,956	60.54%
Republican	Heather C. Collins	10,684	32.41%
Conservative	Brian J. DeSesa	2,313	7.02%
Write-in		11	0.03%
Total votes		32,964	100.00%

2016 New York State Assembly district 1 general election
Party	Candidate	Votes	%
Democratic	Fred Thiele (incumbent)	30,803	54.26%
Independence	Fred Thiele (incumbent)	2,243	3.95%
Working Families	Fred Thiele (incumbent)	1,772	3.12%
We The People	Fred Thiele (incumbent)	428	0.75%
Total	Fred Thiele (incumbent)	35,426	62.40%
Republican	Heather C. Collins	21,280	37.48%
Write-in		67	0.12%
Total votes		56,773	100.00%

2018 New York State Assembly district 1 general election
Party	Candidate	Votes	%
Democratic	Fred Thiele (incumbent)	29,166	56.17%
Independence	Fred Thiele (incumbent)	1,493	2.88%
Working Families	Fred Thiele (incumbent)	872	1.68%
Other Parties	Fred Thiele (incumbent)	430	0.83%
Total	Fred Thiele (incumbent)	31,961	61.55%
Republican	Patrick M. O'Connor	17,818	34.32%
Conservative	Patrick M. O'Connor	2,135	4.11%
Total	Patrick M. O'Connor	19,953	38.43%
Write-in		9	0.02%
Total votes		51,923	100.00%

2020 New York State Assembly district 1 general election
Party	Candidate	Votes	%
Democratic	Fred Thiele (incumbent)	39,195	56.12%
Independence	Fred Thiele (incumbent)	1,494	2.14%
Total	Fred Thiele (incumbent)	40,689	58.26%
Republican	Heather C. Collins	25,850	37.01%
Conservative	Heather C. Collins	3,283	4.70%
Total	Heather C. Collins	29,183	41.78%
Write-in		19	0.03%
Total votes		69,841	100.00%

New York State Assembly
Preceded by John L. Behan	Member of the New York State Assembly from the 2nd district 1995–2012	Succeeded by Daniel Losquadro
Preceded by Daniel Losquadro	Member of the New York State Assembly from the 1st district 2013–2025	Incumbent
