= Anthony Acampora =

American academic

- Occupations: Professor emeritus of electrical and computer engineering
- Title: Professor Emeritus
- Awards: IEEE Fellow (1988)

Academic background
- Education: Brooklyn Polytechnic Institute (Ph.D., 1973)

Academic work
- Discipline: Electrical engineering
- Sub-discipline: Telecommunications, Wireless communication, Broadband networks
- Institutions: University of California, San Diego; Columbia University
- Notable works: An Introduction to Broadband Networks (1994)

Anthony Acampora is a professor emeritus of Electrical and Computer Engineering as well as the founder of the Center for Wireless Communications at the University of California, San Diego.

== Education and career ==
Acampora earned a Ph.D. in electrical engineering from Brooklyn Polytechnic Institute in 1973. Before joining the University of California, San Diego in 1995, he served as a professor of electrical engineering and as the Director of the Center for Telecommunications Research at Columbia University. Acampora is also an Institute of Electrical and Electronics Engineers fellow. for contribution to high capacity digital satellite systems and broadband local communication networks.

== Research ==
He is known to be a 'leading expert in telecommunications' and is interested in improving digital infrastructure through investigating challenges like broadband packet networks, network management, and universal wireless access.

== Selected publications ==
- An Introduction to Broadband Networks
