= New York's 1st State Senate district =

American legislative district

Senator
Anthony Palumbo; R–New Suffolk
- Registration: 33.05% Democratic; 31.64% Republican; 27.56% No party preference
- Demographics: 73.5% White; 5.9% Black; 16.7% Hispanic; 2.2% Asian; 0.3% Native American; 0% Hawaiian/Pacific Islander; 0.4% Other; 1.0% Multiracial
- Population (2019): 316,934
- Registered voters: 257,083

New York's 1st State Senate district is one of 63 districts in the New York State Senate. It has been represented by Republican Anthony Palumbo since 2021, succeeding fellow Republican Kenneth LaValle.

== Geography ==
District 1 covers the eastern end of Suffolk County on Long Island, including the towns of East Hampton, Southold, Shelter Island, Southampton, and Riverhead, as well as some of eastern Brookhaven.

The district is located entirely within New York's 1st congressional district, and overlaps with the 1st, 2nd, 3rd, and 4th districts of the New York State Assembly.

== Federal election results ==
Year	Office	Results
2020	President	Biden 49.9 – 48.8%
2018	Senate	Gillibrand 54.4– 45.5%
2016	President	Trump 52.3 – 44.4%
2012	President	Obama 50.9 – 47.9%
2012	Senate	Gillibrand 62.8 – 36.0%

== List of office holders ==
	Party	Dates	Counties	Notes
Simeon S. Hawkins	Republican	January 1, 1888 – December 31, 1889		
Edward Hawkins	Democrat	January 1, 1890 – December 31, 1891		
Edward Floyd-Jones	Democrat	January 1, 1892 – December 31, 1893		
John Lewis Childs	Republican	January 1, 1894 – December 31, 1895		
Richard Higbie	Republican	January 1, 1896 – December 31, 1898		
John L. Havens	Democratic	January 1, 1899 – December 31, 1900		
William M. McKinney	Republican	January 1, 1901 – December 31, 1902		
Edwin Bailey Jr.	Democrat	January 1, 1903 – December 31, 1904		
Carll S. Burr Jr.	Republican	January 1, 1905 – December 31, 1908		
Orlando Hubbs	Democrat	January 1, 1909 – December 31, 1910		
James L. Long	Democrat	January 1, 1911 – December 31, 1912		
Thomas H. O'Keefe	Democrat	January 1, 1913 – December 31, 1914		
George L. Thompson	Republican	January 1, 1915 – September 1, 1941		
Perry B. Duryea	Republican	January 1, 1942 – April 11, 1945		
W. Kingsland Macy	Republican	November 6, 1945 – November 5, 1946		
S. Wentworth Horton	Republican	January 1, 1947 – December 31, 1956		
Elisha T. Barrett	Republican	January 1, 1957 – December 31, 1965		
Leon E. Giuffreda	Republican	January 1, 1966 – December 31, 1976		
Kenneth LaValle	Republican	January 1, 1977 – December 31, 2020		
Anthony Palumbo	Republican	January 1, 2021 – present	Suffolk	

== Recent election results ==
=== 2026 ===
2026 New York State Senate election, District 1
Party	Candidate	Votes	%
Republican	Anthony Palumbo		
Conservative	Anthony Palumbo		
Total	Anthony Palumbo (incumbent)		
Democratic	Chris Murray		
Working Families	Chris Murray		
Total	Chris Murray		
Write-in			
Total votes			

=== 2024 ===
2024 New York State Senate election, District 1
Party	Candidate	Votes	%
Republican	Anthony Palumbo	77,459	
Conservative	Anthony Palumbo	10,132	
Total	Anthony Palumbo (incumbent)	87,591	52.9
Democratic	Sarah Anker	76,874	
Common Sense Suffolk	Sarah Anker	979	
Total	Sarah Anker	77,853	47.1
Write-in		49	0.0
Total votes		165,493	100.0
Republican hold			

=== 2022 ===
2022 New York State Senate election, District 1
Party	Candidate	Votes	%
Republican	Anthony Palumbo	63,829	
Conservative	Anthony Palumbo	9,795	
Total	Anthony Palumbo (incumbent)	73,624	56.0
Democratic	Skyler Johnson	54,854	
Working Families	Skyler Johnson	2,885	
Total	Skyler Johnson	57,739	44.0
Write-in		14	0.0
Total votes		131,377	100.0
Republican hold			

=== 2020 ===
2020 New York State Senate election, District 1
Primary election
Party	Candidate	Votes	%
Democratic	Laura Ahearn	8,427	34.2
Democratic	Valerie Cartright	6,569	26.8
Democratic	Thomas Schiavoni	5,822	23.6
Democratic	Skyler Johnson	2,827	11.4
Democratic	Nora Higgins	952	3.9
Write-in		29	0.1
Total votes		24,626	100.0
General election
Republican	Anthony Palumbo	77,666	
Conservative	Anthony Palumbo	9,897	
Total	Anthony Palumbo	87,563	51.4
Democratic	Laura Ahearn	81,543	
Protect The Taxpayer	Laura Ahearn	1,357	
Total	Laura Ahearn	82,900	48.6
Write-in		35	0.0
Total votes		170,498	100.0
Republican hold			

=== 2018 ===
2018 New York State Senate election, District 1
Party	Candidate	Votes	%
Republican	Kenneth LaValle	60,586	
Conservative	Kenneth LaValle	6,920	
Independence	Kenneth LaValle	3,150	
Reform	Kenneth LaValle	361	
Total	Kenneth LaValle (incumbent)	71,017	56.9
Democratic	Greg Fischer	53,790	43.1
Write-in		54	0.0
Total votes		124,861	100.0
Republican hold			

=== 2016 ===
2016 New York State Senate election, District 1
Party	Candidate	Votes	%
Republican	Kenneth LaValle	78,075	
Conservative	Kenneth LaValle	11,092	
Independence	Kenneth LaValle	5,073	
Reform	Kenneth LaValle	516	
Total	Kenneth LaValle (incumbent)	94,756	66.4
Democratic	Greg Fischer	47,813	33.5
Write-in		121	0.1
Total votes		142,690	100.0
Republican hold			

=== 2014 ===
2014 New York State Senate election, District 1
Party	Candidate	Votes	%
Republican	Kenneth LaValle	43,972	
Conservative	Kenneth LaValle	8,005	
Independence	Kenneth LaValle	4,496	
Total	Kenneth LaValle (incumbent)	56,473	70.0
Democratic	Michael Conroy	24,154	30.0
Write-in		36	0.0
Total votes		80,663	100.0
Republican hold			

=== 2012 ===
2012 New York State Senate election, District 1
Primary election
Party	Candidate	Votes	%
Democratic	Bridget Fleming	2,308	78.2
Democratic	Jennifer Maertz	644	21.8
Write-in		0	0.0
Total votes		2,952	100.0
General election
Republican	Kenneth LaValle	61,309	
Conservative	Kenneth LaValle	10,489	
Independence	Kenneth LaValle	4,208	
Total	Kenneth LaValle (incumbent)	76,006	59.7
Democratic	Bridget Fleming	47,041	
Working Families	Bridget Fleming	4,260	
Total	Bridget Fleming	51,301	40.3
Write-in		35	0.0
Total votes		127,342	100.0
Republican hold			
