= Tommy John Schiavoni =

American politician

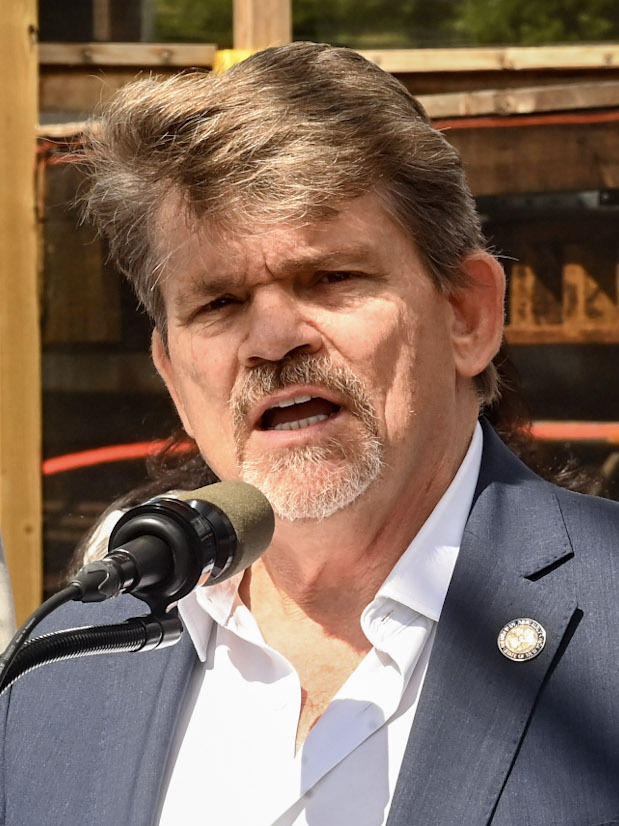
- Schiavoni speaking in 2026

Member of the New York State Assembly from the 1st district
- Incumbent
- Assumed office January 1, 2025
- Preceded by: Fred Thiele

Personal details
- Party: Democratic
- Education: State University of New York at Cortland (BA); Stony Brook University (MA)
- Committees: Environmental Conservation, Local Governments, Agriculture, Alcoholism & Drug Abuse, Agriculture
- Website: https://nyassembly.gov/mem/Tommy-John-Schiavoni

Tommy John Schiavoni is an American politician representing the 1st District of the New York State Assembly since 2025. A Democrat, he represents part of Suffolk County, including the towns of Southampton, East Hampton, Shelter Island, Southold, and part of Brookhaven. Schiavoni represents a region commonly known as the "East End" of Long Island.

A life-long resident of the East End, Schiavoni is a former educator of over thirty years. He taught U.S. History & Government and Economics in the Center Moriches School District from 1988 until retirement in 2018.

== Political career ==
Schiavoni is a former member of the Southampton Town Council, where he served for just under two terms until his election to the State Assembly In the 2024 New York State Assembly election, Schiavoni succeeded Fred Thiele.

Before winning election as a Southampton Town Councilman in 2017, Schiavoni first served on the North Haven Village Zoning Board of Appeals in 2008. In 2014, he was elected to the North Haven Village Board, and in 2016, he was appointed to the Southampton Town ZBA before his election to the Town Council in 2017. Schiavoni also served on the Sag Harbor School Board of Education from 2014 to 2017.

In the New York State Assembly, Schiavoni is a member on 5 committees, including the Assembly Committee on Environmental Conservation, the Assembly Committee on Local Governments, the Assembly Committee on Agriculture, the Assembly Committee on Alcoholism & Drug Abuse, and the Assembly Committee on Veterans' Affairs.

New York State Assembly
Preceded by Fred Thiele	Member of the New York Assembly from the 1st District; 2025–present	Incumbent
