= Kenneth LaValle =

American politician

Kenneth P. LaValle
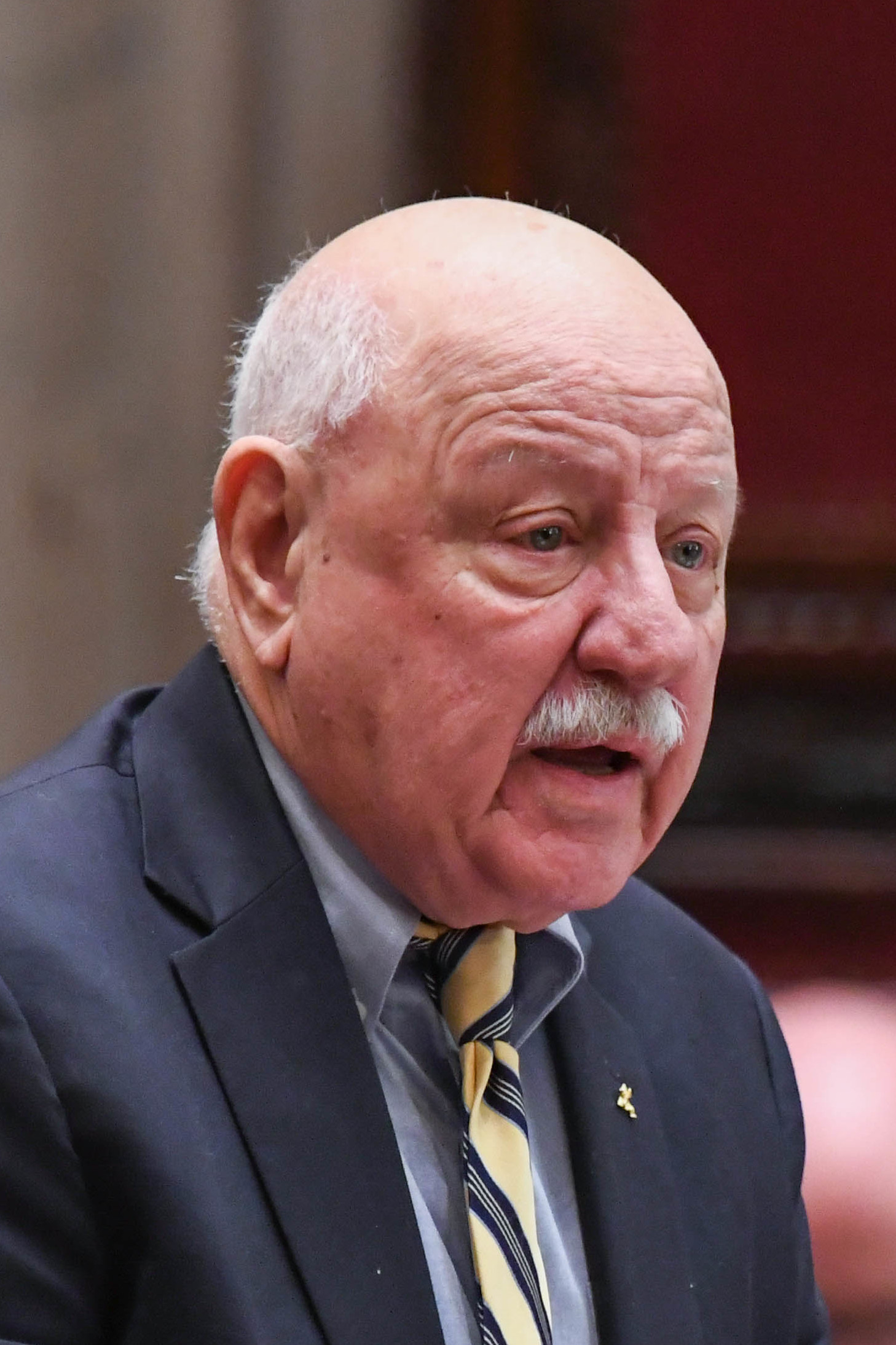

Member of the New York State Senate from the 1st district
- In office January 1, 1977 – December 31, 2020
- Preceded by: Leon E. Giuffreda
- Succeeded by: Anthony Palumbo

Personal details
- Born: May 22, 1939 (age 87) Brooklyn, New York
- Party: Republican
- Spouse: Penny LaValle
- Education: Adelphi University (BS); State University of New York at New Paltz (MS); Touro College (JD)
- Website: www.nysenate.gov/senators/kenneth-p-lavalle

Kenneth P. LaValle (born May 22, 1939 in Brooklyn, New York) is a former American politician. He represented District 1 in the New York State Senate. The district comprises the five East End towns of Long Island, New York, as well as the central and eastern portions of the Town of Brookhaven, New York. A Republican, LaValle was first elected in 1976. Upon his retirement in 2020, he was the longest-serving member of the Senate and had served more terms in office than any other current state senator in the United States.

== Early life, education, and family ==
Born in Brooklyn, LaValle graduated from Hempstead High School. He received a B.S degree from Adelphi University in 1961 and an M.S. in Education from the State University of New York at New Paltz (SUNY New Paltz) in 1964. He also received a Juris Doctor from the Touro College Jacob D. Fuchsberg Law Center in 1987. LaValle is an attorney; he was admitted to the New York bar in 1993.

LaValle is the father of two grown children. He resides in Port Jefferson, New York, with his wife, Penny.

== New York Senate ==
LaValle first ran for the New York Senate in 1976 to succeed retiring Senator Leon E. Giuffreda. He defeated Democratic nominee Barry McCoy, a physicist, winning 51% of the vote. Since then, he has faced very few serious challenges in his re-election campaigns.

In 2007, Gov. Eliot Spitzer appointed LaValle to the New York State Commission on Higher Education, which was charged with identifying ways of improving the quality of higher education in the State. LaValle also served on the National Council of State Legislatures’ Blue Ribbon Commission on Higher Education. He played a key role in the development of the School Tax Relief (STAR) program. He also authored the 1993 Pine Barrens Preservation Act.

In 2011, LaValle voted against allowing same-sex marriage in New York during roll-call for the Marriage Equality Act, which legalized same-sex marriage in the state.

The Kenneth P. LaValle Stadium at Stony Brook University bears his name.

On January 10, 2020, LaValle announced that he would not seek re-election to the Senate in 2020. He was succeeded by Anthony Palumbo, and his term ended on December 31, 2020.

New York State Senate
Preceded by Leon E. Giuffreda	Member of the New York State Senate from the 1st district 1977–2020	Succeeded by Anthony Palumbo
Preceded by Toby Ann Stavisky	Chairman of the New York State Senate Higher Education Committee; 2011–2018	Succeeded by Toby Ann Stavisky
