= Baiting Hollow, New York =

- Hamlet and census-designated place
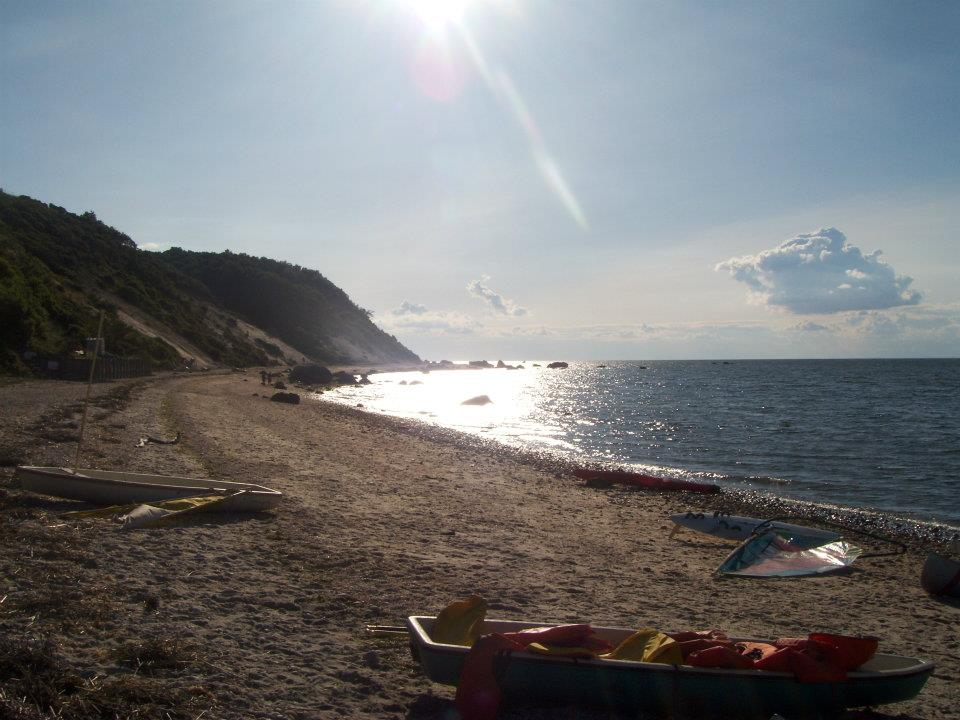
- A beach in Baiting Hollow.

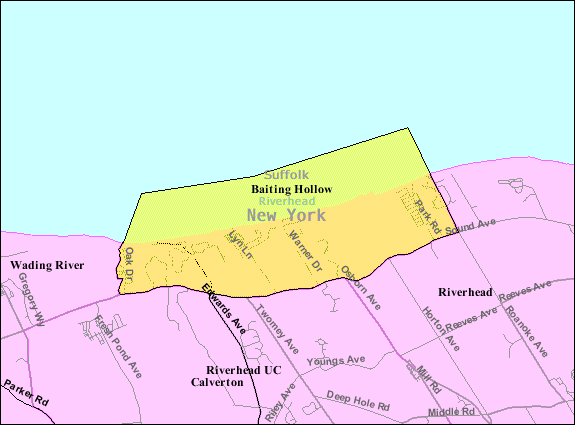
- U.S. Census map of Baiting Hollow.

- Location within the state of New York.
- Coordinates: 40°58′3″N 72°44′26″W
- Country: United States
- State: New York
- County: Suffolk
- Town: Riverhead

Area
  - Total: 7.42 sq mi (19.23 km^{2})
  - Land: 5.21 sq mi (13.49 km^{2})
  - Water: 2.22 sq mi (5.74 km^{2})
- Elevation: 105 ft (32 m)

Population (2020)
  - Total: 2,763
  - Density: 530.3/sq mi (204.76/km^{2})
- Time zone: UTC-5 (Eastern (EST))
  - Summer (DST): UTC-4 (EDT)
- ZIP code: 11933
- Area codes: 631, 934
- FIPS code: 36-04055
- GNIS feature ID: 0942815

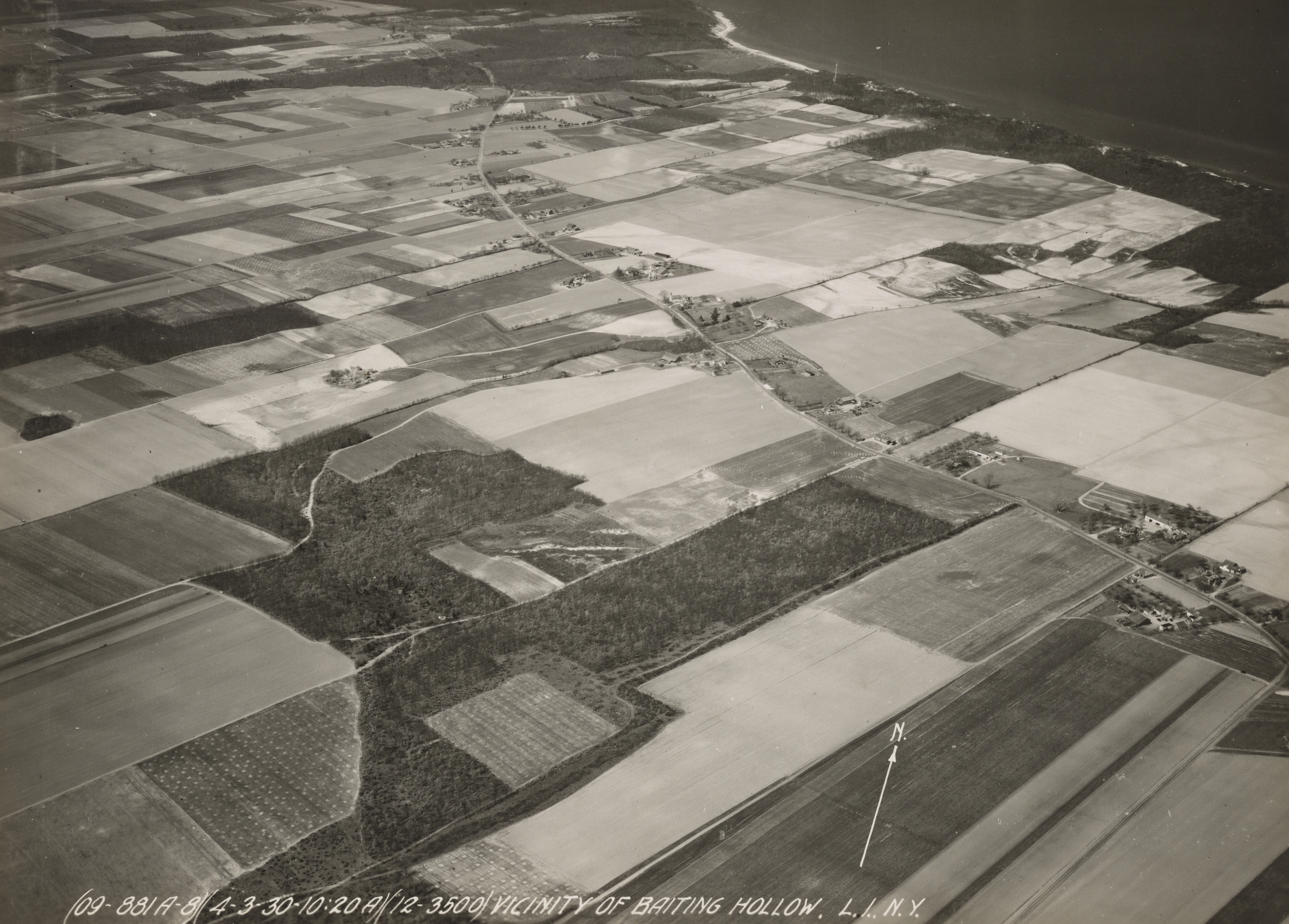
Baiting Hollow in 1931

Baiting Hollow is a census-designated place (CDP) roughly corresponding to the hamlet by the same name in the Town of Riverhead in Suffolk County, on Long Island, in New York, United States. As of the 2020 census, Baiting Hollow had a population of 2,763.

== Geography ==
According to the United States Census Bureau, the CDP has a total area of 3.2 square miles (8.3 km^{2}), all of it land.

=== Climate ===
Climate data for Baiting Hollow, New York, 1991–2020 normals, extremes 2007–present
Month	Jan	Feb	Mar	Apr	May	Jun	Jul	Aug	Sep	Oct	Nov	Dec	Year
Record high °F (°C)	68 (20)	71 (22)	77 (25)	87 (31)	92 (33)	94 (34)	98 (37)	95 (35)	93 (34)	90 (32)	78 (26)	64 (18)	98 (37)
Mean daily maximum °F (°C)	38.4 (3.6)	39.5 (4.2)	46.8 (8.2)	57.0 (13.9)	68.0 (20.0)	76.8 (24.9)	82.6 (28.1)	81.3 (27.4)	74.7 (23.7)	63.5 (17.5)	52.8 (11.6)	43.4 (6.3)	60.4 (15.8)
Daily mean °F (°C)	30.3 (−0.9)	31.4 (−0.3)	37.8 (3.2)	47.4 (8.6)	57.3 (14.1)	66.5 (19.2)	72.6 (22.6)	71.5 (21.9)	65.0 (18.3)	53.7 (12.1)	44.1 (6.7)	35.1 (1.7)	51.1 (10.6)
Mean daily minimum °F (°C)	22.2 (−5.4)	23.2 (−4.9)	28.7 (−1.8)	37.8 (3.2)	46.7 (8.2)	56.3 (13.5)	62.6 (17.0)	61.7 (16.5)	55.2 (12.9)	43.9 (6.6)	35.4 (1.9)	26.9 (−2.8)	41.7 (5.4)
Record low °F (°C)	−4 (−20)	−5 (−21)	4 (−16)	20 (−7)	26 (−3)	40 (4)	46 (8)	46 (8)	36 (2)	25 (−4)	15 (−9)	8 (−13)	−5 (−21)
Average precipitation inches (mm)	3.82 (97)	2.72 (69)	4.99 (127)	4.25 (108)	3.70 (94)	3.95 (100)	3.32 (84)	3.84 (98)	4.26 (108)	4.74 (120)	3.92 (100)	5.10 (130)	48.61 (1,235)
Average precipitation days (≥ 0.01 in)	11.0	11.1	11.1	12.7	13.0	10.6	10.1	11.0	10.9	14.1	10.4	12.8	138.8
Source 1: NOAA
Source 2: National Weather Service

== Demographics ==
Historical population
Census	Pop.	Note	%±
2020	2,763		—
U.S. Decennial Census

=== 2020 census ===
As of the 2020 census, Baiting Hollow had a population of 2,763. The median age was 50.3 years. 17.4% of residents were under the age of 18 and 22.4% of residents were 65 years of age or older. For every 100 females there were 97.6 males, and for every 100 females age 18 and over there were 98.9 males age 18 and over.

65.7% of residents lived in urban areas, while 34.3% lived in rural areas.

There were 1,081 households in Baiting Hollow, of which 24.4% had children under the age of 18 living in them. Of all households, 59.2% were married-couple households, 15.0% were households with a male householder and no spouse or partner present, and 20.3% were households with a female householder and no spouse or partner present. About 22.8% of all households were made up of individuals and 11.6% had someone living alone who was 65 years of age or older.

There were 1,656 housing units, of which 34.7% were vacant. The homeowner vacancy rate was 3.0% and the rental vacancy rate was 14.0%.

Racial composition as of the 2020 census
Race	Number	Percent
White	2,347	84.9%
Black or African American	68	2.5%
American Indian and Alaska Native	23	0.8%
Asian	22	0.8%
Native Hawaiian and Other Pacific Islander	1	0.0%
Some other race	122	4.4%
Two or more races	180	6.5%
Hispanic or Latino (of any race)	309	11.2%

=== 2000 census ===
As of the census of 2000, there were 1,449 people, 600 households, and 429 families residing in the CDP. The population density was 448.7 inhabitants per square mile (173.2/km^{2}). There were 962 housing units at an average density of 297.9 per square mile (115.0/km^{2}). The racial makeup of the CDP was 96.27% White, 1.38% African American, 0.55% Asian, 0.97% from other races, and 0.83% from two or more races. Hispanic or Latino of any race were 4.00% of the population.

There were 600 households, out of which 24.2% had children under the age of 18 living with them, 63.0% were married couples living together, 5.3% had a female householder with no husband present, and 28.5% were non-families. 24.3% of all households were made up of individuals, and 8.2% had someone living alone who was 65 years of age or older. The average household size was 2.39 and the average family size was 2.84.

In the CDP, the population was spread out, with 18.9% under the age of 18, 4.8% from 18 to 24, 29.3% from 25 to 44, 33.7% from 45 to 64, and 13.3% who were 65 years of age or older. The median age was 44 years. For every 100 females, there were 108.2 males. For every 100 females age 18 and over, there were 101.2 males.

The median income for a household in the CDP was $128,622, and the median income for a family was $126,455. Males had a median income of $128,036 versus $121,685 for females. The per capita income for the CDP was $96,375. About 1.8% of families and 4.4% of the population were below the poverty line, including none of those under age 18 and 13.8% of those age 65 or over.

== Economy ==
Baiting Hollow New York has a high medican household income, unemployment as low as 1.8%. Most residents are employed in professional services, retail, manufacturing, and education.

- Long Island Spirits

== Education ==
=== School district ===
Baiting Hollow is located entirely within the boundaries of the Riverhead Central School District. As such, all children who reside within Baiting Hollow and attend public schools go to Riverhead's schools.

=== Library district ===
Baiting Hollow is located within the boundaries of the Baiting Hollow Free Library. The boundaries of this library district correspond with those of the hamlet.

== Notable people ==
- Charlie Jarzombek (September 30, 1942 – March 22, 1987) - professional race car driver.
