= New York's 1st State Assembly district =

American legislative district

Assemblymember
T. John Schiavoni; D–Sag Harbor
- Registration: 36.9% Democratic; 28.5% Republican; 27.5% No party preference
- Demographics: 73% White; 5% Black; 18% Hispanic; 2% Asian; 0% Native American; 0% Hawaiian/Pacific Islander; 1% Other; 3% Multiracial
- Population (2020): 130,087
- Registered voters: 96,995

New York's 1st State Assembly district is one of the 150 districts in the New York State Assembly. It has been represented by Democratic Assemblyman Tommy John Schiavoni since 2025, succeeding Fred Thiele.

== Geography ==
=== 2020s ===
District 1 is located entirely within Suffolk County, comprising the eastern portion of the county. The district includes the towns of Shelter Island, East Hampton, Southold, and portions of Southampton and Brookhaven. The district includes The Hamptons and Montauk.

The 1st district is entirely within New York's 1st congressional district, and overlaps the 1st and 3rd districts of the New York State Senate.

=== 2010s ===
District 1 was located entirely within Suffolk County, comprising the southeastern portion of the county. The district included the towns of Shelter Island, East Hampton, Southampton, and a portion of Brookhaven. The district included The Hamptons and Montauk.

== Recent election results ==
=== 2026 ===
2026 New York State Assembly election, District 1
Party	Candidate	Votes	%
Democratic	T. John Schiavoni		
Working Families	T. John Schiavoni		
Total	T. John Schiavoni (incumbent)		
Republican	Stephen Kiely		
Conservative	Stephen Kiely		
Total	Stephen Kiely		
Write-in			
Total votes			

=== 2024 ===
2024 New York State Assembly election, District 1
Party	Candidate	Votes	%
Democratic	T. John Schiavoni	33,700	
Working Families	T. John Schiavoni	1,544	
Total	T. John Schiavoni	35,244	56.4
Republican	Stephen Kiely	23,909	
Conservative	Stephen Kiely	3,344	
Total	Stephen Kiely	27,253	43.6
Write-in		26	0.0
Total votes		62,523	100.0
Democratic hold			

=== 2022 ===
2022 New York State Assembly election, District 1
Party	Candidate	Votes	%
Democratic	Fred Thiele (incumbent)	29,862	55.2
Republican	Peter Ganley III	20,891	
Conservative	Peter Ganley III	3,351	
Total	Peter Ganley III	24,242	44.8
Write-in		7	0.0
Total votes		54,111	100.0
Democratic gain from Independence			

=== 2020 ===
2020 New York State Assembly election, District 1
Party	Candidate	Votes	%
Democratic	Fred Thiele	39,195	
Independence	Fred Thiele	1,494	
Total	Fred Thiele (incumbent)	40,689	58.3
Republican	Heather Collins	25,850	
Conservative	Heather Collins	3,283	
Total	Heather Collins	29,133	41.7
Write-in		19	0.0
Total votes		69,841	100.0
Independence hold			

=== 2018 ===
2018 New York State Assembly election, District 1
Party	Candidate	Votes	%
Democratic	Fred Thiele	29,166	
Independence	Fred Thiele	1,493	
Working Families	Fred Thiele	872	
Women's Equality	Fred Thiele	333	
Reform	Fred Thiele	97	
Total	Fred Thiele (incumbent)	31,961	61.6
Republican	Patrick O'Connor	17,818	
Conservative	Patrick O'Connor	2,135	
Total	Patrick O'Connor	19,953	38.4
Write-in		9	0.0
Total votes		51,923	100.0
Independence hold			

=== 2016 ===
2016 New York State Assembly election, District 1
Party	Candidate	Votes	%
Democratic	Fred Thiele	30,803	
Independence	Fred Thiele	2,243	
Working Families	Fred Thiele	1,772	
Women's Equality	Fred Thiele	428	
Total	Fred Thiele (incumbent)	35,246	62.3
Republican	Heather Collins	21,280	37.6
Write-in		67	0.1
Total votes		56,593	100.0
Independence hold			

=== 2014 ===
2014 New York State Assembly election, District 1
Party	Candidate	Votes	%
Democratic	Fred Thiele	30,803	
Independence	Fred Thiele	2,243	
Working Families	Fred Thiele	1,772	
Total	Fred Thiele (incumbent)	19,956	60.6
Republican	Heather Collins	10,684	32.4
Conservative	Brian DeSesa	2,313	7.0
Write-in		11	0.0
Total votes		32,964	100.0
Independence hold			

=== 2012 ===
2012 New York State Assembly election, District 1
Party	Candidate	Votes	%
Democratic	Fred Thiele	29,761	
Independence	Fred Thiele	4,228	
Working Families	Fred Thiele	4,156	
Total	Fred Thiele	38,145	99.2
Write-in		290	0.8
Total votes		38,435	100.0
Independence win (new boundaries)			
