= Anthony Palumbo =

American politician (born 1970)

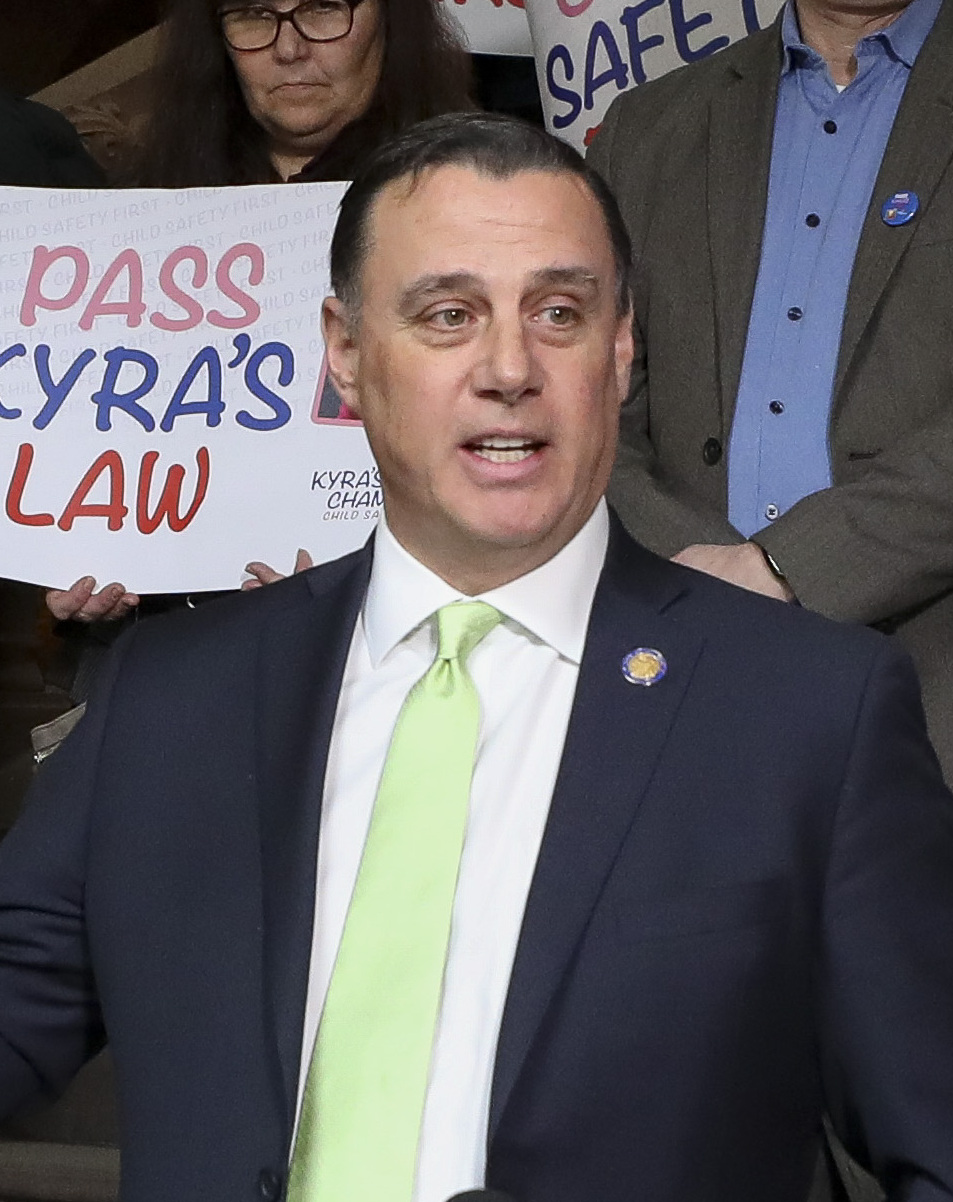
- Palumbo in 2021

Member of the New York State Senate from the 1st district
- Incumbent
- Assumed office January 1, 2021
- Preceded by: Kenneth LaValle
- Succeeded by: Chris Murray (elect)

Member of the New York State Assembly from the 2nd district
- In office November 6, 2013 – December 31, 2020
- Preceded by: Daniel Losquadro
- Succeeded by: Jodi Giglio

Personal details
- Born: September 14, 1970 (age 56) Brookhaven, New York, U.S.
- Party: Republican
- Spouse: Tracy Palumbo
- Children: 2
- Education: Lafayette College (BA); St. John's University (JD)
- Website: Official website

Anthony Howard Palumbo (born September 14, 1970) is an American Republican Party politician who currently represents the 1st district of the New York State Senate. He previously served as a member of the New York State Assembly.

Palumbo attended high school at Patchogue-Medford High School where he starred as a baseball player earning an athletic scholarship to Lafayette College. In 1992, Palumbo was named to the All-Patriot League baseball team. In 1994 Palumbo graduated with a bachelor's degree in Government and Law from Lafayette College.

He attended the St. John's University School of Law and after his graduation in 1998 immediately began his career in public service as an assistant district attorney. He was eventually promoted to the position of trial supervisor to the five eastern Suffolk County towns under District Attorney Thomas Spota. He left the District Attorney's office in 2004 to open a small law practice in Mattituck, New York.

Palumbo resides in New Suffolk, New York with his wife Tracy and two children.

== Career ==
=== New York State Assembly ===
In 2013, in his first political campaign, Palumbo defeated Democrat John McManmon with 57% of the vote for the open 2nd Assembly District seat. In 2014 he ran for re-election against Democratic challenger Thomas Schirilo and won with 63% of the vote. He was re-elected again in 2016 and 2018.

=== New York State Senate ===
In 2020, after Senator Kenneth P. LaValle announced he would not be running for reelection after 44 years in the New York State Senate, Palumbo entered the race and won against Democratic challenger Laura Ahearn.

Palumbo introduced a bill that would allow the towns of East Hampton, Riverhead, Shelter Island, Southampton, and Southold to establish community housing funds that would help provide financial assistance to first-time home purchasers in the form of a grant or loan. The bill was signed by the governor.

== Electoral history ==
2020 New York State Senate election, District 1
Party	Candidate	Votes	%	±%
Democratic	Laura Ahearn	81,543	47.8%	+4.7
Protect the Taxpayer	Laura Ahearn	1,357	0.8%	N/A
Total	Laura Ahearn	82,900	48.6%	
Republican	Anthony Palumbo	77,666	45.6%	−2.9
Conservative	Anthony Palumbo	9,897	5.8%	+0.2
Total	Anthony Palumbo	87,563	51.4%	

New York State Assembly
Preceded by Daniel Losquadro	New York Assembly, 2nd district 2013–2020	Succeeded by Jodi Giglio
New York State Senate
Preceded by Kenneth LaValle	New York State Senate, 1st district 2021-Present	Incumbent
