= New York's 34th State Assembly district =

American legislative district

Assemblymember
Jessica González-Rojas; D–East Elmhurst
- Registration: 65.1% Democratic; 9.4% Republican; 22.7% No party preference
- Demographics: 13% White; 2% Black; 55% Hispanic; 26% Asian; 0% Native American; 0% Hawaiian/Pacific Islander; 0% Other
- Population (2020): 112,296
- Registered voters: 70,427

New York's 34th State Assembly district is one of the 150 districts in the New York State Assembly. It has been represented by Jessica González-Rojas since 2021, defeating then-incumbent Michael DenDekker.

== Geography ==
=== 2020s ===
District 34 is located in Queens, comprising most of the neighborhood of Jackson Heights, and parts of Corona, East Elmhurst and eastern and northern Astoria.

The district overlaps New York's 6th, 7th and 14th congressional districts, as well as the 11th, 12th and 13th districts of the New York State Senate, and the 21st, 22nd, 25th and 26th districts of the New York City Council.

=== 2010s ===
District 34 is located in Queens, comprising the neighborhoods of Jackson Heights, and parts of Corona, Woodside, and East Elmhurst.

== 2026 election ==
Assemblymember González-Rojas is leaving her seat to pursue a nearby New York Senate seat in the 2026 election. Multiple candidates are seeking to replace her.

== Recent election results ==
=== 2026 ===
2026 New York State Assembly election, District 34
Primary election
Party	Candidate	Votes	%
Democratic	Brian Romero	5,064	67.0
Democratic	Rosa Sanchez	2,436	32.2
Write-in		63	0.8
Total votes		7,563	100.0
General election
Democratic	Brian Romero		
Working Families	Brian Romero		
Total	Brian Romero		
Write-in			
Total votes			100.0

=== 2024 ===
2024 New York State Assembly election, District 34
Primary election
Party	Candidate	Votes	%
Democratic	Jessica González-Rojas (incumbent)	3,673	82.7
Democratic	Ricardo Pacheco	754	17.0
Write-in		14	0.3
Total votes		4,441	100
General election
Democratic	Jessica González-Rojas	21,293	
Working Families	Jessica González-Rojas	5,342	
Total	Jessica González-Rojas (incumbent)	26,635	98.2
Write-in		491	1.8
Total votes		27,126	100.0
Democratic hold			

=== 2022 ===
2022 New York State Assembly election, District 34
Party	Candidate	Votes	%
Democratic	Jessica González-Rojas	13,045	
Working Families	Jessica González-Rojas	3,406	
Total	Jessica González-Rojas (incumbent)	16,451	98.3
Write-in		284	1.7
Total votes		16,735	100.0
Democratic win (new boundaries)			

=== 2020 ===
2020 New York State Assembly election, District 34
Primary election
Party	Candidate	Votes	%
Democratic	Jessica González-Rojas	4,087	41.5
Democratic	Michael DenDekker (incumbent)	2,374	24.1
Democratic	Joy Chowdhury	1,458	14.8
Democratic	Nuala O'Doherty-Naranjo	1,347	13.7
Democratic	Angel Cruz	579	5.9
Write-in		11	0.0
Total votes		9,856	100.0
General election
Democratic	Jessica González-Rojas	22,631	
Working Families	Jessica González-Rojas	3,521	
Total	Jessica González-Rojas	26,152	78.2
Republican	William Marquez	6,661	
Conservative	William Marquez	575	
Total	William Marquez	7,236	21.6
Write-in		47	0.2
Total votes		33,435	100.0
Democratic hold			

=== 2018 ===
2018 New York State Assembly election, District 34
Party	Candidate	Votes	%
Democratic	Michael DenDekker (incumbent)	18,078	99.2
Write-in		148	0.8
Total votes		18,226	100
Democratic hold			

=== 2016 ===
2016 New York State Assembly election, District 34
Party	Candidate	Votes	%
Democratic	Michael DenDekker (incumbent)	24,161	99.5
Write-in		114	0.5
Total votes		24,275	100.0
Democratic hold			

=== 2014 ===
2014 New York State Assembly election, District 34
Party	Candidate	Votes	%
Democratic	Michael DenDekker	6,680	
Working Families	Michael DenDekker	1,077	
Total	Michael DenDekker (incumbent)	7,757	99.5
Write-in		36	0.5
Total votes		7,793	100.0
Democratic hold			

=== 2012 ===
2012 New York State Assembly election, District 34
Party	Candidate	Votes	%
Democratic	Michael DenDekker	17,796	
Working Families	Michael DenDekker	1,037	
Total	Michael DenDekker (incumbent)	18,833	99.8
Write-in		36	0.2
Total votes		18,869	100.0
Democratic hold			

=== 2010 ===
2010 New York State Assembly election, District 34
Party	Candidate	Votes	%
Democratic	Michael DenDekker	8,995	
Working Families	Michael DenDekker	1,122	
Total	Michael DenDekker (incumbent)	10,117	99.7
Write-in		33	0.3
Total votes		10,150	100.0
Democratic hold			

=== 2008 ===
2008 New York State Assembly election, District 34
Party	Candidate	Votes	%
Democratic	Michael DenDekker	14,921	100.0
Write-in		1	0.0
Total votes		14,922	100.0
Democratic hold			

=== 2006 ===
2006 New York State Assembly election, District 34
Party	Candidate	Votes	%
Democratic	Ivan Lafayette	9,213	
Working Families	Ivan Lafayette	559	
Total	Ivan Lafayette (incumbent)	9,772	100.0
Write-in		3	0.0
Total votes		9,775	100.0
Democratic hold			

=== 2004 ===
2004 New York State Assembly election, District 34
Party	Candidate	Votes	%
Democratic	Ivan Lafayette	15,202	
Working Families	Ivan Lafayette	732	
Total	Ivan Lafayette (incumbent)	15,934	100.0
Write-in		0	0.0
Total votes		15,934	100.0
Democratic hold			

=== 2002 ===
2002 New York State Assembly election, District 34
Party	Candidate	Votes	%
Democratic	Ivan Lafayette	7,354	
Working Families	Ivan Lafayette	331	
Liberal	Ivan Lafayette	264	
Total	Ivan Lafayette (incumbent)	7,949	100.0
Write-in		3	0.0
Total votes		7,952	100.0
Democratic hold			

=== 2000 ===
2000 New York State Assembly election, District 34
Party	Candidate	Votes	%
Democratic	Ivan Lafayette	15,619	
Working Families	Ivan Lafayette	364	
Liberal	Ivan Lafayette	318	
Total	Ivan Lafayette (incumbent)	16,301	84.7
Republican	Rafael Merino	2,668	
Conservative	Rafael Merino	277	
Total	Rafael Merino	2,945	15.3
Write-in		1	0.0
Total votes		19,247	100.0
Democratic hold			

=== Federal results in Assembly District 34 ===
Year	Office	Results
2024	President	Harris 59.7 - 37.8%
2024	Senate	Gillibrand 64.7 - 34.0%
2022	Senate	Schumer 69.5 - 29.6%
2020	President	Biden 74.8 - 24.1%
2018	Senate	Gillibrand 86.4 - 13.5%
2016	President	Clinton 80.9 - 16.1%
2016	Senate	Schumer 85.0 - 12.4%
2012	President	Obama 83.4 - 15.4%
2012	Senate	Gillibrand 86.2 - 12.5%
