= Shanel Thomas-Henry =

American politician

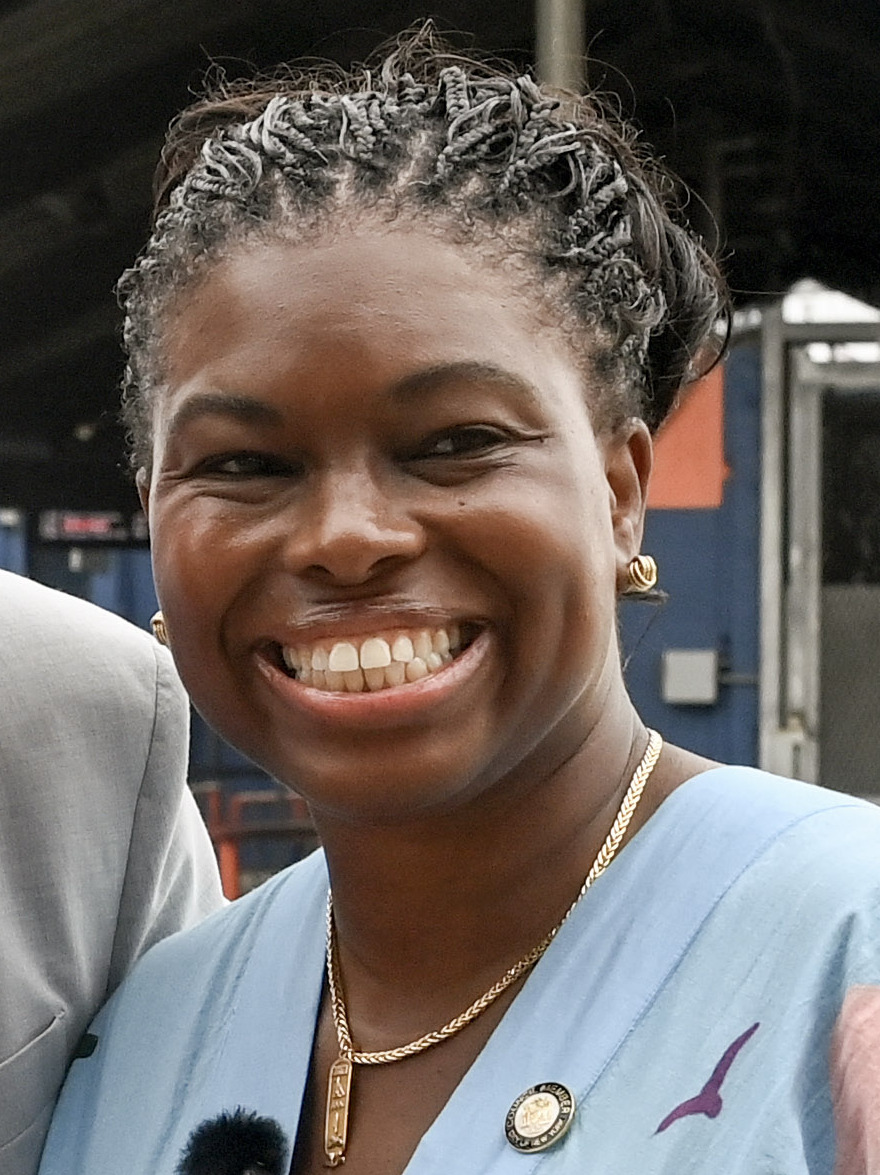
- Thomas-Henry in 2026

Member of the New York City Council from the 21st district
- Incumbent
- Assumed office January 1, 2026
- Preceded by: Francisco Moya

Personal details
- Born: Shanel Thomas; March 31, 1979 (age 47) Queens, New York, U.S.
- Party: Democratic
- Spouse: Ty Henry
- Children: 2
- Education: Howard University (BA, MAPA)
- Website: Official website Campaign website

Shanel Thomas-Henry is an American politician serving as a member of the New York City Council from the 21st district. A Democrat, she was elected in 2025 to succeed term-limited Democrat Francisco Moya.

== Early life and career ==
Thomas-Henry was born and raised in Corona and Elmhurst, Queens. She graduated from Howard University with a Bachelor of Arts in international relations and with a Master of Arts in Public Administration.

Thomas-Henry worked on community engagement and outreach for the LaGuardia Redevelopment Program. She was appointed to the Queens Community Board 3 by borough president Donovan Richards in 2024. She serves on the board of directors of the New York City Industrial Development Agency and Build NYC Resource Corporation within the New York City Economic Development Corporation.

== New York City Council ==
=== 2025 election ===
Thomas-Henry and fellow candidate Yanna Henriquez successfully sued to get former councilmember Hiram Monseratte, who was previously imprisoned on federal corruption charges, kicked off the primary ballot. She was endorsed by District Council 37 and state senator Jessica Ramos. After ranked-choice voting tabulations, Thomas-Henry was declared the winner with a narrow lead over Erycka Montoya.

=== Issues ===
In August 2026, Thomas-Henry was the only member of the New York City Council Progressive Caucus to not sign a letter calling for Democratic leadership in the United States Congress to push for abolishing the United States Immigration and Customs Enforcement (ICE). Thomas-Henry described ICE's actions as "deplorable" but stated the agency should be reformed instead.

== Electoral history ==
=== 2025 ===
2025 New York City Council Democratic primary, District 21
Party	Candidate	Maximum round	Maximum votes	Share in maximum round	Maximum votes First round votes Transfer votes
Democratic	Shanel Thomas-Henry	4	3,117	53.1%	
Democratic	Erycka Montoya	4	2,751	46.9%	
Democratic	Yanna M. Henriquez	3	1,944	27.9%	
Democratic	David Aiken	2	1,566	20.1%	
Write-In		1	64	0.8%	

2025 New York City Council election, District 21
Party	Candidate	Votes	%
Democratic	Shanel Thomas-Henry	11,014	68.0
Working Families	Shanel Thomas-Henry	1,339	8.3
Total	Shanel Thomas-Henry	12,353	76.2
Republican	Giovanni Enrique Franco	3,395	20.9
United Alliance	Giovanni Enrique Franco	416	2.6
Total	Giovanni Enrique Franco	3,811	23.5
Write-in		43	0.3
Total votes		16,207	100.0
Democratic hold			
