= Jessica González-Rojas =

American activist, politician, and academic

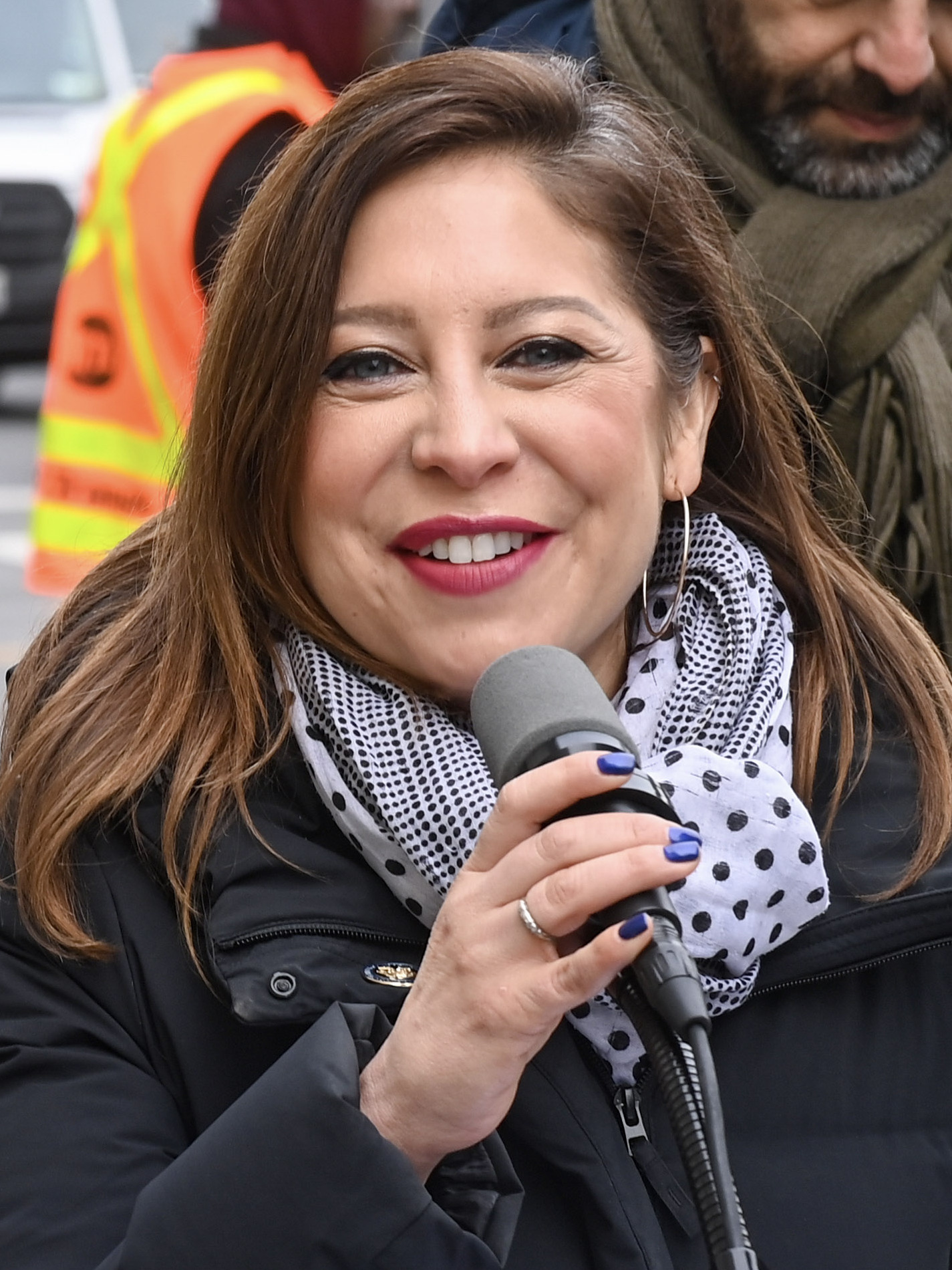
- González-Rojas in 2023

Member of the New York State Assembly from the 34th district
- Incumbent
- Assumed office January 1, 2021
- Preceded by: Michael DenDekker

Personal details
- Born: May 19, 1976 (age 50) New York City, New York, U.S.
- Party: Democratic
- Other political affiliations: Working Families (Note: González-Rojas has been elected on both the Democratic and Working Families ballot lines through New York's system of electoral fusion.); Democratic Socialists of America (Note: Democratic Socialists of America (DSA) is not a registered political party. Instead, it is a political organization for those with democratic socialist ideologies. González-Rojas is a member of the New York City DSA chapter, but did not seek its endorsement.)
- Education: Boston University (BA); New York University (MPA)
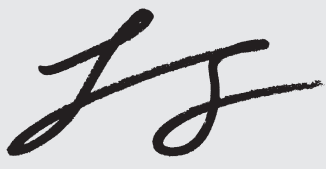
- Signature
- Website: State Assembly website

Jessica González-Rojas (born May 19, 1976) is an American activist, politician, and academic serving as a member of the New York State Assembly from the 34th district since 2021. A Democrat and member of the New York City Democratic Socialists of America, she was first elected in 2020 after defeating incumbent Michael DenDekker in the primary. She is currently running to represent the 13th district in the New York State Senate. She is the second openly LGBTQ female elected to the New York State Assembly and the first openly queer female elected to the New York State Senate.

== Early life, education, and career ==
González-Rojas was born in Queens and raised in what she calls an "immigrant family and a Puerto Rican family", and is of Paraguayan and Puerto Rican descent. She has lived in Jackson Heights since 1999. She earned a bachelor's degree in international relations from Boston University and, in 2003, a Master's in Public Administration (M.P.A.) from New York University's Robert F. Wagner Graduate School of Public Service. She interned at the office of Congressmember Nydia Velázquez. A "defining moment" in her activism occurred in 1994, when anti-abortion protesters outside a Planned Parenthood clinic in Boston grabbed her.

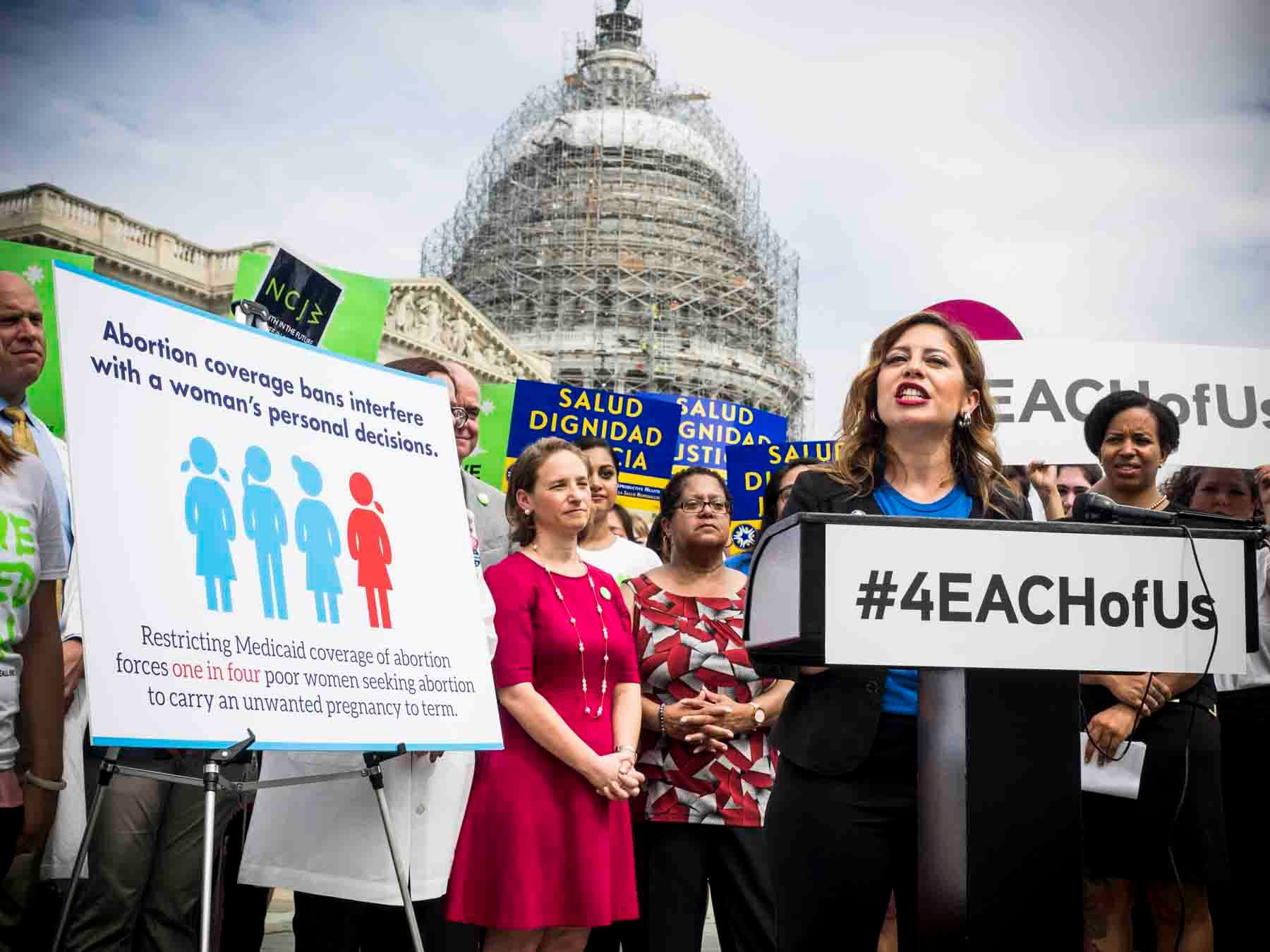
González-Rojas at the introduction for the EACH Woman Act legislation.

González-Rojas previously served as the executive director of the National Latina Institute for Reproductive Health, an organization that advocates for access to affordable health and reproductive care for Latino and immigrant communities. As the head of NLIRH, she wrote and spoke about reproductive justice in news outlets as well as in academic settings. González-Rojas has additionally served as an adjunct professor of Latin American Studies at the City University of New York's City College.

From 2002 to 2006, González-Rojas served on the state Democratic Committee for New York's 29th Assembly District. From 2005 to 2013, she served on the New York City Transit Riders Council of the Permanent Citizens Advisory Committee to the Metropolitan Transportation Authority.

== New York State Assembly ==
In 2019, González-Rojas announced she was running in the 2020 Democratic primary for the 34th district of the New York State Assembly, held by Michael DenDekker, and covering parts of Jackson Heights, Woodside, Corona and East Elmhurst, all within Queens, New York. Her campaign was endorsed by U.S. Senator Bernie Sanders. The COVID-19 pandemic caused her campaign to switch to virtual campaigning and mutual aid work. She won the June primary and the November election, becoming the first Latina to represent the district. She was re-elected in November 2024, running on the Democratic Party and Working Family Party lines.

González-Rojas is a member of the Democratic Socialists of America (DSA). In the 2021 New York City mayoral election, she was the first elected official to endorse Dianne Morales, a progressive nonprofit executive.

In December 2024, González-Rojas' bill was signed into law by Governor Kathy Hochul mandating that all New York State agencies add Middle Eastern and North African categories on applications and surveys for self-identification.

=== Committee membership ===
González-Rojas is a member of the Committee on Children and Families, the Committee on Cities, the Committee on Corporations, Authorities and Commissions, the Committee on Environmental Conservation, and the Committee on Social Services. She is also a member of the Asian Pacific American Task Force, the Black, Puerto Rican, Hispanic & Asian Legislative Caucus, the Legislative Women's Caucus, the Task Force on New Americans, the Puerto Rican/Hispanic Task Force, and the Task Force on Women's Issues.

== State Senate candidacy ==
In July 2025, González-Rojas announced her campaign for the New York State Senate in 2026 for the 13th district held by incumbent Democrat Jessica Ramos. Ramos had drawn backlash for previously alienating progressives and endorsing Andrew Cuomo in the 2025 New York City Democratic mayoral primary. Upon announcing her candidacy, González-Rojas was endorsed by New York City Comptroller Brad Lander, Borough President Donovan Richards, fellow assemblymember Catalina Cruz, and New York City Councilmembers Shekar Krishnan and Tiffany Cabán. She was also endorsed by Representative Alexandria Ocasio-Cortez.

Local immigrant advocacy group Make The Road Action endorsed González-Rojas in September 2025, and the Working Families Party in December 2025, favoring her over Ramos (whom they had previously endorsed). While González-Rojas is a member of the Democratic Socialists of America, she did not apply for NYC DSA's endorsement for this race.

The two candidates differed in their stances on the proposed Metropolitan Park project in Flushing Meadows-Corona Park, an integrated resort next to Citi Field with a casino proposed by New York Mets owner Steve Cohen. Ramos opposes it while González-Rojas supports it, citing potential benefits to the local area. Ramos has said that "Jessica González-Rojas is Steve Cohen’s state Senate candidate" and that her "launch was sponsored precisely by consultants of the casino" (at least two consultants on Cohen's lobbying payroll served on González-Rojas’ campaign launch party host committee).

In mid-June 2026, as early voting in the election was underway, New York Focus reported a new influx of campaign spending, with an anonymous donation of $850,000 to a super PAC to support González-Rojas and oppose Ramos. New York Focus described it as "what appears to be New York’s biggest-ever donation to an independent expenditure committee focused on a single state legislative primary race."

González-Rojas defeated Ramos and Hiram Monserrate in the primary election, and will face the Republican candidate in the general election in November.

== Personal life ==
González-Rojas is queer. She lives in Jackson Heights with her partner and their son.
