= John Sabini =

American politician

John D. Sabini

Member of the New York State Senate from the 13th district
- In office January 1, 2003 – June 2008
- Preceded by: Daniel Hevesi
- Succeeded by: Hiram Monserrate

Member of the New York City Council from the 25th district
- In office January 1, 1992 – December 31, 2001
- Succeeded by: Helen Sears

Personal details
- Born: November 15, 1956 (age 69)
- Party: Democratic
- Education: New York University

John D. Sabini is the former chairman of the New York State Racing and Wagering Board. He was confirmed by the New York State Senate in August 2008 and served until 2013. Sabini had previously been a member of the State Senate, a Democrat, serving from 2003 to 2008, and represented parts of Jackson Heights, Corona, East Elmhurst, Elmhurst and Woodside. He had previously represented much of the same area as a member of New York City Council from 1992 to 2001.

== Early life ==
A lifelong resident of Jackson Heights, Sabini won election to the Community Advisory Board at Elmhurst Hospital at age 16. When he was 19, he was appointed to Community Board No. 3-Q, where he served until his election to the City Council.

Sabini holds a degree from New York University's College of Business and Public Administration, now known as the Stern School, and attended its Graduate School of Public Administration, now known as the Robert F. Wagner Graduate School of Public Service.

Sabini served as District Administrator for Congressmen James H. Scheuer and Stephen J. Solarz. He also served as Director of the State Assembly's Subcommittee on Senior Citizen Facilities. Prior to his election to the City Council, Sabini was Vice President of the MWW Group, a public and government relations firm based in New Jersey.

== Career ==
The crisis surrounding the Queens County Democratic Organization following the death of Donald Manes in 1986 was a defining moment in Sabini's career. Sabini was thrust into the position of interim chairman at the time when scrutiny from the media and federal investigators threatened the future of the local party organization. His success in stepping in to clean up the party earned him glowing editorial support from The New York Times and Newsday. After completing the unexpired term he was replaced by Congressman Thomas J. Manton after that year's primary election.

=== City Council ===
On the City Council, Sabini held the post of Council representative to the City's Commission on Public Information and Communications, a panel seeking ways to improve interaction between New York City residents and city government and increased use of technology. He was appointed Chair of the Council's Subcommittee on Landmarks, Public Siting and Maritime Uses and was chosen for membership on the Council's influential Land Use Committee and on the Subcommittee on Planning, Dispositions and Concessions. In his legislative duties, he introduced and co-sponsored many bills that have helped to improve the quality of life for New Yorkers, including the Aggressive Panhandling bill and the Landmark Notification Law, which requires the commercial tenants doing business in historic districts be informed about their responsibilities under the city's landmarks law.

=== NYS Senate ===
When the newly configured 13th Senate District was unveiled in the spring of 2002, Sabini became a candidate who amassed broad support within the Democratic Party. In 2004 and 2006 he was the Democratic nominee and was re-elected in the general election.

Upon joining the Senate, Sabini received several high-profile appointments unprecedented for a new member. He was appointed as the ranking member of the Elections Committee and was the Senate Democratic conferee on a conference committee designed to set up the state's framework to comply with the federal Help America Vote Act. Sabini was also appointed to the Rules Committee, the first freshman Democrat since 1937 to serve in that capacity.

In his first term, he introduced the bill that established by law the Flight 587 Memorial Scholarship, honoring the victims of that flight that crashed on the way to the Dominican Republic. He later introduced a bill — which also later passed into law — to prevent the scheduling of statewide exams during major religious holidays.

In 2006, Sabini was appointed as Assistant Minority Leader for Intergovernmental Affairs. He served as the liaison between the Senate Minority Conference and the Governor's office, the State Assembly, Congress and local governments. Sabini simultaneously maintained his ranking membership status on the Transportation and Racing, Gaming & Wagering Committees.

Sabini was also appointed to several high-profile panels in 2006. In February he served as the only New York State representative on a national transportation leadership summit at the White House. In April he served as the only New York City legislator on Governor Eliot Spitzer's special panel to determine the future of thoroughbred racing in New York and the operations of Belmont Park, Aqueduct Racetrack, and Saratoga Race Course.

=== Driving while ability impaired ===
On September 27, 2007, Albany police pulled over Sabini. He failed a field-sobriety test and declined to take a Breathalyzer. Sabini pleaded guilty to a charge of driving while ability impaired. He paid a $300 fine, agreed to enroll in DWI classes, and his driver's license was suspended for six months.

=== End of State Senate term ===
Queens County Democratic party officials declined to support Sabini for re-election in 2008. Instead, 12 of the 14 members of the party's county executive Committee gave their support to Hiram P. Monserrate, citing Monserrate's strength in the 2006 election and the changing ethnic politics of the district that were increasingly favorable to the challenger.

=== New York State Racing and Wagering Board ===
Sabini resigned his Senate seat to accept a nomination by Governor Paterson to become head of the New York State Racing and Wagering Board. Monserrate then won the Democratic primary nomination and was elected to the Senate.

Political offices
| Preceded by Susan Alter | New York City Council, 25th district 1992–2001 | Succeeded by Helen Sears |
New York State Senate
| Preceded by Daniel Hevesi | New York State Senate, 13th district 2003–2008 | Succeeded by Hiram Monserrate |
