= Jose Peralta =

American politician (1971–2018)

José Peralta
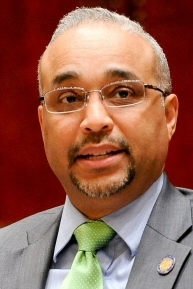

Member of the New York Senate from the 13th district
- In office March 17, 2010 – November 21, 2018
- Preceded by: Hiram Monserrate
- Succeeded by: Jessica Ramos

Member of the New York State Assembly from the 39th district
- In office January 1, 2003 – March 17, 2010
- Preceded by: Frank Seddio
- Succeeded by: Francisco Moya

Personal details
- Born: José Rafael Peralta; November 10, 1971 New York City, New York, U.S.
- Died: November 21, 2018 (aged 47) New York City, New York, U.S.
- Party: Democratic
- Other political affiliations: Independent Democratic Conference (2017–2018)
- Spouse: Evelyn
- Children: 2
- Education: Queens College, City University of New York

José Rafael Peralta (November 10, 1971 – November 21, 2018) was an American politician who served in the New York State Assembly and New York State Senate. A member of the Democratic Party, he last represented District 13 in the State Senate, which includes the Queens neighborhoods of Corona, East Elmhurst, Elmhurst, Jackson Heights, and Woodside. He previously represented District 39 in the New York State Assembly, which is located in Queens, New York and includes Corona, Elmhurst and Jackson Heights. He was elected to the New York State Senate in a landslide on March 16, 2010. Peralta was a member of the Independent Democratic Conference (IDC), a group of Democratic senators who allied themselves with Senate Republicans. He was re-elected in 2012, 2014 and 2016, but was defeated in the 2018 Democratic primary.

Peralta died of leukemia at the age of 47 on November 21, 2018.

== Life and family ==
Born in New York City on November 10, 1971, Peralta was a first-generation Dominican-American. After immigrating to the United States from the Dominican Republic, Peralta's father was employed as a bank teller. His mother, Rose Hernandez, worked as a seamstress. At the age of 8, Peralta moved with his family from Washington Heights, Manhattan to Queens. Peralta attended public elementary school in New York City and graduated from Flushing High School in 1989. He enrolled at Queens College, City University of New York and became the first Latino Student Body President at the college. Peralta graduated from Queens College in 1996, with a degree in psychology.

After graduating from Queens College, Peralta was a community liaison in the New York State Assembly. Peralta represented the interests of immigrants on the New York City Central Labor Council, serving in the position of Director of the Commission on the Dignity for Immigrants.

Peralta was a political staffer on campaigns in New York including Brian McLaughlin's campaign for New York State Assembly, Toby Stavisky's campaign for New York State Senate, Alan Hevesi election bid for New York City Comptroller and Hillary Clinton's campaign for United States Senate. Peralta was married to Evelyn, and had two sons, Myles and Matthew.

== Political career ==
=== New York State Assembly ===
In the November 5, 2002 election, Peralta won a seat in the New York State Assembly representing District 39. He ran as a Democrat and beat candidate Charles Gonzales, a Republican. Peralta received 76 percent of the votes cast. He was the first Hispanic from Queens, New York to win an election to serve in the New York state Assembly. The 39th Assembly District in New York was created in 2002 as a result of the significant increase in immigrant population in the region. Peralta was sworn in as a member of the Assembly by Civil Court Judge Diccia Pineda, also of Dominican heritage. Peralta took the oath of office in Corona, New York at the New York Hall of Science. In attendance at Peralta's swearing-in ceremony were United States Senator Charles Schumer, Speaker of the New York State Assembly Sheldon Silver and Assemblyman Brian McLaughlin.

In March 2004, Peralta requested that state Republican leadership pass legislation which proposed to increase the state's minimum wage to $7.15 per hour. In April 2007, Peralta introduced anti-gang legislation in the Assembly that focused on creating Gang Free School Zones surrounding schools in New York. In June 2007, Peralta was among a majority of the Assembly that voted to support passage of a same-sex marriage bill in New York. In January 2008, Peralta co-signed legislation with Sheldon Silver, Audrey Pheffer and Rory I. Lancman which put forth a proposal of $150 million in funding for families that had the possibility of their homes being foreclosed upon.

Peralta worked with fellow Assemblyman Jeffrion Aubry to change the Rockefeller drug laws. Peralta served in the Assembly as Chair of the Subcommittee on Banking in Underserved Communities. He worked to encourage banks to move into underserved regions through his Banking Development District legislation.

=== New York State Senate ===
In October 2009, Peralta stated his intention to run for the New York State Senate for a seat representing District 13. The Queens Democratic Party lent support to Peralta in his campaign for the Senate seat. An article in The New York Times in October 2009 described Peralta as "one of the party’s rising stars". Politician Hiram Monserrate was expelled from the Senate on February 9, 2010 by a 53–8 vote of his former colleagues after being convicted of misdemeanor assault on his girlfriend Karla Giraldo. Peralta became a candidate for the March 16, 2010 special election to fill the Senate seat left vacant due to Monserrate's expulsion.

The Police Benevolent Association of the New York State Troopers endorsed Peralta on February 26, 2010. Civil rights activist Al Sharpton endorsed Peralta in February 2010. On March 2, 2010, Peralta received an endorsement from New York City Council member Julissa Ferreras. Peralta received the endorsement of the Empire State Pride Agenda (ESPA) due to his support for LGBT rights. Peralta also received endorsements from groups including the New York chapter of the National Organization for Women, building services workers union the Service Employees International Union (SEIU) sector 32BJ and Fight Back New York. On March 16, 2010, Peralta was elected to the New York State Senate. He was sworn in on March 17.

In January 2017, Peralta joined the Independent Democratic Conference (IDC), a group of Democratic senators that caucused with the Senate Republicans, allowing the Republicans to control the chamber. After joining the majority coalition, he was named vice chair of the Senate Committee on Energy and Telecommunications. Peralta received a $12,500 stipend (known as a "lulu") for his position as vice chair, although state law designates these stipends for committee chairs only. The Republican conference submitted falsified payroll information listing Peralta as committee chair so that he could receive the stipend, although the IDC argued that Peralta was legally entitled to the stipends for his position as vice chair.

In April 2018, Peralta and his IDC colleagues rejoined the Senate Democratic Conference.

In the September 2018 Democratic Party primary, Peralta was defeated by Jessica Ramos, a board member of the Jackson Heights Beautification Group. Peralta's nine-point loss was attributed to long-simmering anger with the former members of the IDC. Due to New York State's electoral fusion laws allowing candidates to run on multiple ballot lines in an election, Peralta appeared in the November 6, 2018 general election as the third-party candidate for the Independence Party of New York, the Women's Equality Party and the Reform Party of New York State; however, Peralta conceded the race to Ramos and promised to support her campaign.

== Election results ==
- November 2002 general election, NYS Assembly, 39th AD

| Jose R. Peralta (DEM – WOR) | ... | 5,782 |
| Charley S. Gonzalez (REP – IND – CON – RTL) | ... | 2,085 |

- November 2004 general election, NYS Assembly, 39th AD

| Jose R. Peralta (DEM – WOR) | ... | 12,415 |
| Giash U. Ahmed (REP) | ... | 1,966 |

- November 2006 general election, NYS Assembly, 39th AD

| Jose R. Peralta (DEM – WOR) | ... | 7,081 |
| (uncontested) |

- November 2008 general election, NYS Assembly, 39th AD

| Jose R. Peralta (DEM – WOR) | ... | 12,664 |
| (uncontested) |

- March 2010 special election, NYS Senate, 13th SD

| Jose R. Peralta (DEM – WOR) | ... | 10,337 |
| Robert Beltrani (REP) | ... | 1,162 |
| Hiram Monserrate (YWC) | ... | 4,223 |

- November 2010 general election, NYS Senate, 13th SD

| Jose R. Peralta (DEM – WOR) | ... | 23,962 |
| Richard La Salle (REP – IND – CON) | ... | 4,979 |

- November 2012 general election, NYS Senate, 13th SD

| Jose R. Peralta (DEM – WOR) | ... | 49,893 (uncontested) |

- November 2014 general election, NYS Senate, 13th SD

| Jose R. Peralta (DEM – WOR) | ... | 19,968 (uncontested) |

- November 2016 general election, NYS Senate, 13th SD

| Jose R. Peralta (DEM – WOR) | ... | 59,896 |
| Jesus Gonzalez (REP – CON – REF ) | ... | 9,162 |

== See also ==
- List of Queens College people

New York State Assembly
| Preceded by Frank R. Seddio | New York State Assembly, 39th District; 2003–2010 | Succeeded by Francisco Moya |
New York State Senate
| Preceded by Hiram Monserrate | New York State Senate, 13th District; 2010–2018 | Succeeded by Jessica Ramos |
Political offices
| Preceded by Hiram Monserrate | Chairman of the Senate Committee on Consumer Protection; March 2010 – December 2010 | Succeeded by Lee Zeldin |
