= Helen Sears =

Member of the New York City Council from the 25th district
- In office January 1, 2002 – December 31, 2009
- Preceded by: John Sabini
- Succeeded by: Daniel Dromm

Personal details
- Born: December 22, 1929 (age 96)
- Party: Democratic

Helen Sears (born December 22, 1929) is a New York Democrat who represented the 25th district of Queens in the New York City Council from 2002 until 2009.

== Personal career and early life ==
Before becoming involved in politics, Sears was a health-care professional. She worked as a Director of Government and Community Affairs for the Health and Hospitals Corporation at Elmhurst Medical Center. She went on to serve as a board member of the NYC Health Systems Agency.

She further worked as a government employee, working as a Senior Specialist for the New York City Department for the Aging. She then founded the Catherine Sheridan Senior Center and the Marjorie Riley Center.

Sears has two sons, a daughter and six grandchildren.

== Political career ==
Her political career started when she was elected to serve as the Queens County Budget Negotiator. Later on, she was actually elected to the New York City Council, representing the 25th district, which encompassed parts of Jackson Heights, Elmhurst, East Elmhurst, Rego Park, Woodside and Corona. The party bosses in the Democratic Party backed her against district leader Daniel Dromm. The election contained a vigorous undercurrent of challenge against New York City term limits imposed against incumbents seeking reelection.

Her main committee assignments included Finance, Health, Juvenile Justice, Land Use, Standards & Ethics, and Zoning & Franchises. She was the first chairwoman of the Women's Issues committee, as well as the standing committee on Standards and Ethics.

She has been praised for her work in securing $600,000 in federal funds that went towards preventing congestion.

On September 15, 2009, in her bid for election to a third term, Sears was defeated 49% to 39% by Daniel Dromm- a Community Organizer and teacher and Democratic District Leader.

== Criticisms ==
=== Vendor's Controversy ===
Sears was sharply criticized for sponsoring a bill that would ban vending from some busier streets. One concerned resident said: "This would ruin my business," said Maria Piedad, 65, of Jackson Heights, through a translator. "I would lose most of my clients." Councilwoman Sears's position was stated by her as: "I called for a vendor-free zone because the area has become overly dense with vending carts that impeded traffic and threaten public safety," Sears said. "Many of the carts are operated illegally, and residents and small businesses have long taken issue with them." The businesses claim that it is merely a small business concern but some vendors have alleged that the bill may unfairly impact immigrants inadvertently, invoking racial tensions in a trade dispute between business concerns.

Political offices
Preceded by John Sabini	New York City Council, 25th district 2002-2009	Succeeded by Daniel Dromm
