= New York City's 21st City Council district =

- Boundaries following the 2020 census

Government
  - Councilmember: Shanel Thomas-Henry (D—East Elmhurst)

Population (2010)
  - Total: 172,670

Demographics
  - Hispanic: 75%
  - Asian: 13%
  - Black: 6%
  - White: 5%
  - Other: 2%

Registration
  - Democratic: 70.0%
  - Republican: 6.7%
  - No party preference: 20.9%
- Registered voters (2021) 64,275

New York City's 21st City Council district is one of 51 districts in the New York City Council. It has been represented by Democrat Shanel Thomas-Henry since 2026, succeeding term-limited fellow Democrat Francisco Moya.

== Geography ==
District 21 is based in the Queens neighborhood of Corona, also covering parts of nearby Elmhurst, East Elmhurst, and Jackson Heights. LaGuardia Airport is located within the district, as is the northern half of Flushing Meadows–Corona Park (including the park's famous Unisphere).

The district overlaps with Queens Community Boards 3, 4, and 7, and is contained entirely within New York's 14th congressional district. It also overlaps with the 13th and 16th districts of the New York State Senate, and with the 34th, 35th, and 39th districts of the New York State Assembly.

== Recent election results ==
=== 2025 ===
The 2025 New York City Council elections will be held on November 4, 2025, with primary elections occurring on June 24, 2025.

2025 New York City Council election, District 21 Democratic primary
Party	Candidate	Maximum round	Maximum votes	Share in maximum round	Maximum votes First round votes Transfer votes
Democratic	Shanel Thomas-Henry	4	3,117	53.1%	
Democratic	Erycka Montoya	4	2,751	46.9%	
Democratic	Yanna Henriquez	3	1,944	27.9%	
Democratic	David Aiken	2	1,566	20.1%	
Write-in		1	64	0.8%	

2025 New York City Council election, District 21 general election
Party	Candidate	Votes	%
Democratic	Shanel Thomas-Henry	11,014	
Working Families	Shanel Thomas-Henry	1,339	
Total	Shanel Thomas-Henry	12,353	76.2
Republican	Giovanni Franco	3,395	
United Alliance	Giovanni Franco	416	
Total	Giovanni Franco	3,811	23.5
Write-in		43	0.3
Total votes		16,207	100.0
Democratic hold			

=== 2023 (redistricting) ===
Due to redistricting and the 2020 changes to the New York City Charter, councilmembers elected during the 2021 and 2023 City Council elections will serve two-year terms, with full four-year terms resuming after the 2025 New York City Council elections.

2023 New York City Council election, District 21
Party	Candidate	Votes	%
Democratic	Francisco Moya (incumbent)	3,062	97.0
Write-in		94	3.0
Total votes		3,156	100.0
Democratic hold			

=== 2021 ===
An interactive map of District 21

In 2019, voters in New York City approved Ballot Question 1, which implemented ranked-choice voting in all local elections. Under the new system, voters have the option to rank up to five candidates for every local office. Voters whose first-choice candidates fare poorly will have their votes redistributed to other candidates in their ranking until one candidate surpasses the 50 percent threshold. If one candidate surpasses 50 percent in first-choice votes, then ranked-choice tabulations will not occur.

2021 New York City Council election, District 21
Primary election
Party	Candidate	Votes	%
Democratic	Francisco Moya (incumbent)	3,533	51.6
Democratic	Ingrid Gomez	1,248	18.2
Democratic	David Aiken	1,115	16.3
Democratic	George Onuorah	481	7.0
Democratic	Talea Wufka	438	6.4
Write-in		34	0.5
Total votes		6,849	100
General election
Democratic	Francisco Moya (incumbent)	7,169	98.4
Write-in		115	1.6
Total votes		7,284	100
Democratic hold			

=== 2017 ===
2017 New York City Council election, District 21
Primary election
Party	Candidate	Votes	%
Democratic	Francisco Moya	3,654	55.1
Democratic	Hiram Monserrate	2,937	44.3
Write-in		44	0.6
Total votes		6,635	100
General election
Democratic	Francisco Moya	7,828	
Working Families	Francisco Moya	468	
Total	Francisco Moya	8,296	98.9
Write-in		91	1.1
Total votes		8,387	100
Democratic hold			

=== 2013 ===
2013 New York City Council election, District 21
Party	Candidate	Votes	%
Democratic	Julissa Ferreras (incumbent)	8,325	99.7
Write-in		23	0.3
Total votes		8,348	100
Democratic hold			
