= Daniel Dromm =

American politician (born 1955)

Danny Dromm
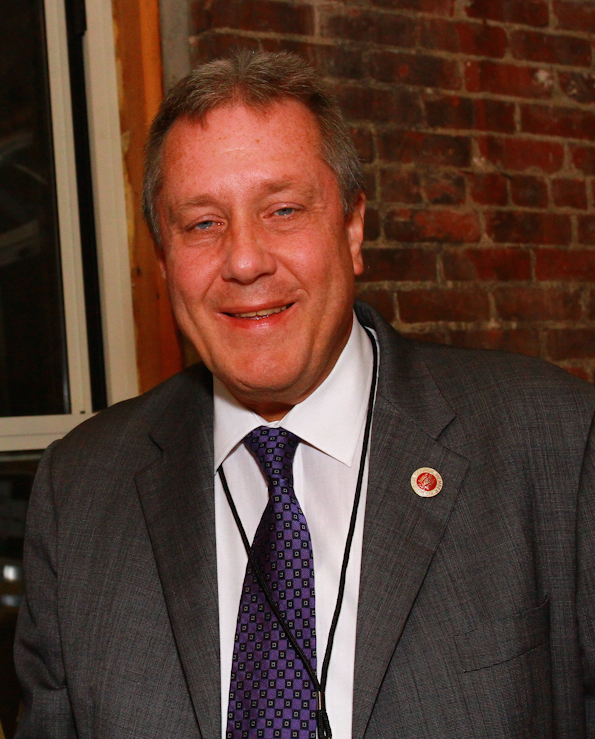
- Dromm in 2013

Member of the New York City Council from the 25th district
- In office January 1, 2010 – December 31, 2021
- Preceded by: Helen Sears
- Succeeded by: Shekar Krishnan

Personal details
- Born: November 27, 1955 (age 70) Queens, New York, U.S.
- Party: Democratic
- Education: Marist College (BA); City College of New York (MS)
- Website: Official website

Daniel Dromm (born November 27, 1955) is an American politician who served on the New York City Council from the 25th district from 2010 to 2021. He is a Democrat. The district includes East Elmhurst, Elmhurst and Jackson Heights in Queens.

== Life and career ==
Dromm was born in Rego Park, but his family moved to Oyster Bay on Long Island when he was 5, and to Manhasset when he was 9. He attended Catholic schools. Dromm graduated from Marist College and earned his master's degree at CUNY's The City College of New York.

A resident of Jackson Heights, Dromm began his first career as a public school teacher in 1984 at P.S. 199 in Sunnyside. As an educator, he promoted teaching acceptance of LGBT individuals through the Rainbow Curriculum and publicly came out in 1992. Heavily involved in the Queens County Democratic Party, he served as Democratic District Leader in the 39th assembly district.

In 1998, Ed Sedarbaum challenged incumbent New York State Senator George Onorato. Dromm worked as the campaign manager for Progressive Democratic candidate Ed Sedarbaum. Onorato won re-election to the State Senate on Election Day 1998.

He and Jimmy Van Bramer are the first two openly male gay Democrats elected to the New York City Council from outside Manhattan. Tiffany Caban was the first openly queer female elected to the City Council from Queens. Lynn Schulman was the first openly lesbian Democrat elected to the City Council from Queens.

Dromm was featured in the 2015 Frederick Wiseman-directed documentary film In Jackson Heights.

Dromm was punched in the face by a truck driver after Dromm took a picture of the truck blocking traffic on the street outside the City Councilman's office in May 2012. Muriel was arrested for assault and stealing Dromm's mobile phone.

== New York City Council ==
As a Democrat, Dromm was elected to the City Council in 2009, representing the 25th district in Queens. He defeated Councilwoman Helen Sears by 10 points, 49% to 39%, in the Democratic primary. Dromm was reelected in 2013 and served as Chairperson of the Council's influential Committee on Education from 2014 to 2017.

In 2014, Dromm co-sponsored New York City Council bill Intro 253 to create the city's first government-issued photo identification card, later named "IDNYC." The bill was passed overwhelmingly by the Council and signed into law by Mayor Bill de Blasio. IDNYC aides the homeless, youth, the elderly, undocumented immigrants, the formerly incarcerated and others who may have difficulty obtaining other government-issued ID. IDNYC is recognized ID for interacting with NYPD and allows cardholders to gain access to all City buildings that provide public services. It is an accepted form of identification for accessing numerous City programs and services such as the Brooklyn Public Library, the Queens Library, and the New York City Public Library, the three library systems serving the City of New York. Several NYC cultural institutions grant cardholders free one-year memberships; these include museums, zoos, concert halls, and botanical gardens.

In 2015, Dromm said he opposed a bill sponsored by New York City Council Member David Greenfield to allow non-public schools (including religious and charter schools) to request that safety agents from the New York Police Department be posted inside the schools and be funded by the Board of Education. Dromm argued that more NYPD officers or safety agents in the schools would not solve the problem of increasing hate crimes citywide and would be counterproductive.

On December 19, 2017, the New York City Council unanimously passed Dromm's resolution establishing January 30 annually as Fred T. Korematsu Day of Civil Liberties and the Constitution in honor of the late civil rights activist who objected to the internment of Japanese Americans during World War II.

In January 2018, Dromm was unanimously elected to serve as the chairperson of the NYC Council Committee on Finance.

Election history
Location	Year	Election	Results
NYC Council District 25	2009	Democratic Primary	Daniel Dromm 49.16% Helen Sears 39.56% Stanley Joseph Kalathara 11.28%
NYC Council District 25	2009	General	Daniel Dromm (D) 74.61% Mujib U. Rahman (R) 25.38%
NYC Council District 25	2013	General	Daniel Dromm (D) 99.61%
NYC Council District 25	2017	General	Daniel Dromm (D) 98.81%

== See also ==
- LGBT culture in New York City
- List of LGBT people from New York City
- NYC Pride March

Political offices
Preceded by Helen Sears	New York City Council, 25th district 2010–2021	Succeeded by Shekar Krishnan
