= Julissa Ferreras =

American politician (born 1976)

Julissa Ferreras-Copeland
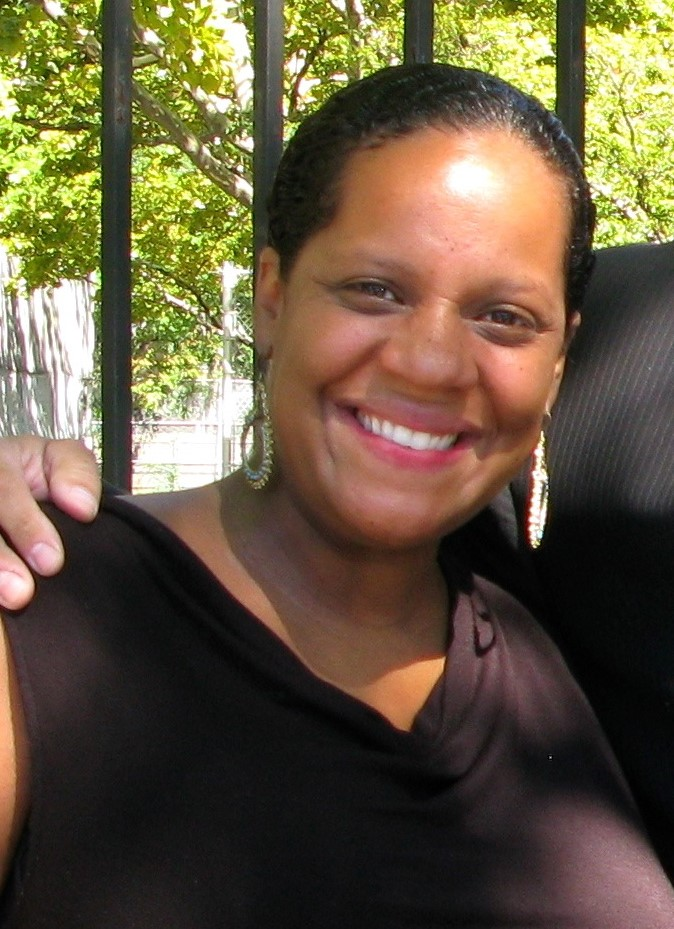

Member of the New York City Council from the 21st district
- In office February 24, 2009 – December 31, 2017
- Preceded by: Hiram Monserrate
- Succeeded by: Francisco Moya

Personal details
- Born: November 2, 1976 (age 50) Corona, Queens U.S.
- Party: Democratic
- Spouse: Aaron Copeland
- Children: 1
- Website: Julissa Ferreras at the New York City Council

Julissa Ferreras-Copeland (born November 2, 1976) is an American politician. She is the former New York City Council Member for the 21st district from 2009 to 2017, which includes portions of College Point, Corona, East Elmhurst, Elmhurst, Flushing, Flushing Meadows Corona Park, Jackson Heights and LaGuardia Airport in the New York City borough of Queens. During her tenure, Ferreras-Copeland served as the chairman of the Finance Committee. She was the first woman, the first person of color, and the youngest member to be elected Finance Chair. She is a Democrat.

== Early life and education ==
Ferreras-Copeland grew up in Corona, Queens to mother Josefina Ferreras-Peláez, an office aide who worked at the New York City Human Resources Administration, and father Julio Alejandro Ferreras, a subway car inspector at New York City's Metropolitan Transportation Authority. Her parents are both from the Dominican Republic but met in New York City at Madison Square Garden at a Fania All-Stars concert.

Ferreras-Copeland graduated from John Bowne High School in Flushing, Queens. She attended LaGuardia Community College and Metropolitan College of New York.

== Career ==
In 1999, at age 19 and after graduating from high school, Ferreras-Copeland became the director of a Beacon program housed in one of the most crowded public schools in the world, Public School 19Q. She was assistant director of the Community Conciliation Network in Corona, Queens.

Ferreras-Copeland's political career officially commenced in 2001 when she became a Democratic National Convention delegate appointed by Assemblyman Ivan Lafayette. She then became the chief of staff and campaign manager for her then-predecessor Councilman Hiram Monserrate. She served in this position from 2001 to 2008. Ferreras-Copeland briefly left the public sector and from 2005 to 2007 served as the New York Director of the National Association of Latino Elected Officials (NALEO), working to support the NALEO Education Fund.

When Councilman Monserrate became involved in a scandal (in 2012, he pleaded guilty to mail fraud), Ferreras-Copeland was among those questioned and cleared. "It was an experience I learned a great deal from," she said. "It was something I overcame and was able to step into my own." "This was a lesson learned," she said, "especially since I worked so hard at building my name and my integrity, to have this little bit of tarnish is not something I ever want to have to face again."

In 2017, Ferreras-Copeland decided to leave politics and not seek re-election, returning to the private sector in order to focus on her family.

== New York City Council ==
In February 2009, Ferreras-Copeland was elected to the 21st district of the New York City Council. Ferreras-Copeland was the first Latina elected to political office in Queens. Starting in 2010, Ferreras-Copeland served as the head of the Committee on Women's Issues. While serving on this committee, in 2010 she held the first city council hearing on street harassment.

After being re-elected for a second term in 2014, Ferreras-Copeland was appointed by Council Speaker Melissa Mark-Viverito to the serve as the first woman and first person of color to chair the City Council's Finance Committee. In this role, Ferreras-Copeland oversaw the city's $78.3 billion budget as well as the Department of Finance, Banking Commission, Tax Commission, Comptroller's Office, Department of Design and Construction and Independent Budget Office.

Ferreras-Copeland was responsible for building hundreds of school seats in Corona, Jackson Heights, and East Elmhurst. Ferreras-Copeland told The New York Times that she allocated funding to build five new schools in her district and all were scheduled to open in Corona in the coming years to handle increased demand.

Ferreras-Copeland developed and supported the creation of Corona Plaza, a former underutilized parking space which has been transformed in a public square. Corona Plaza, which is located at 103rd Street and Roosevelt Avenue, has become a meeting place since it was turned into a pedestrian zone in 2012. Ferreras-Copeland said the plaza has taken on the role of the central squares found in towns and cities in Latin America. "If you go to many of these countries, everyone comes to a centrally located plaza at some point in the day."

Ferreras-Copeland focused on increased transparency in the budgeting process. She improved tax exemptions to build over 15,000 affordable housing developments in New York City. She supported regulations to help small businesses that also fostered job creation. Ferreras-Copeland supported Summer Youth Employment Program (SYEP) and after school programs, HANAC Affordable Senior Housing, Beacon programs, Meals on Wheels, paid sick days, and tenants' rights. She is also an advocate against street harassment and gender-based violence.

Ferreras-Copeland co-sponsored the paid sick leave bill, which in 2017 was expanded in 2017 to include victims of domestic violence, sexual assault, and human trafficking paid leave to attend to immediate safety needs. She advocated for expanded Universal Pre-Kindergarten and launched the creation of the Alliance for Flushing Meadows-Corona Park, a public-private partnership.

In 2016, Ferreras-Copeland sponsored menstrual equity legislation, the first laws of this type in the United States that guarantee access to feminine hygiene products in schools, prisons, and homeless shelters.

Ferreras-Copeland had been considered a favorite in the race to succeed Melissa Mark-Viverito as Speaker of the New York City Council. Like Mark-Viverito, she was considered an ally of then-Mayor Bill de Blasio. Her retirement shook up the race and ultimately led to a victory by Corey Johnson, who had billed himself as the "anti-DeBlasio."

Election history
Location	Year	Election	Results
NYC Council District 21	2009	Special	√ Julissa Ferreras (D) 45.66% Francisco Moya (D) 25.07% George Dixon (NP) 16.15% Eduardo Giraldo (D) 13.12%
NYC Council District 21	2009	Democratic Primary	√ Julissa Ferreras 65.94% Eduardo Giraldo 34.06%
NYC Council District 21	2009	General	√ Julissa Ferreras 99.99%
NYC Council District 21	2013	General	√ Julissa Ferreras 99.72%

== Personal life ==
In 2015, Ferreras-Copeland married Aaron Copeland in a ceremony officiated by Mayor Bill de Blasio at New York City Hall. Copeland is an aerospace engineer and aerospace industry executive. They have one son, Julian, born on September 11, 2013. The family lives in Maryland, where her husband works.

== Awards and leadership ==
- Corona Youth Council, member
- Corona-East Elmhurst NAACP Youth Council, president, 3 years
- 2008: City & State, 40 Under 40
- 2010: Queens Dominican Culture & Heritage Month Organizing Committee, Juan Pablo Duarte Award
- New York City Commission on Gender Equity, commissioner
- 2014: Crain's New York, 40 Under 40
- Dominican American National Roundtable, board member
- NAACP, board member (former)
- Neighborhood Housing Services, board member
- Renaissance Music and Sports, board member
- Elmcor Youth & Adult Activities, Inc., board member
- National Association of Latino Elected and Appointed Officials (NALEO), board member

Political offices
Preceded by Hiram Monserrate	New York City Council, 21st district 2009–2017	Succeeded by Francisco Moya
