= Jessica Ramos =

American politician (born 1985)

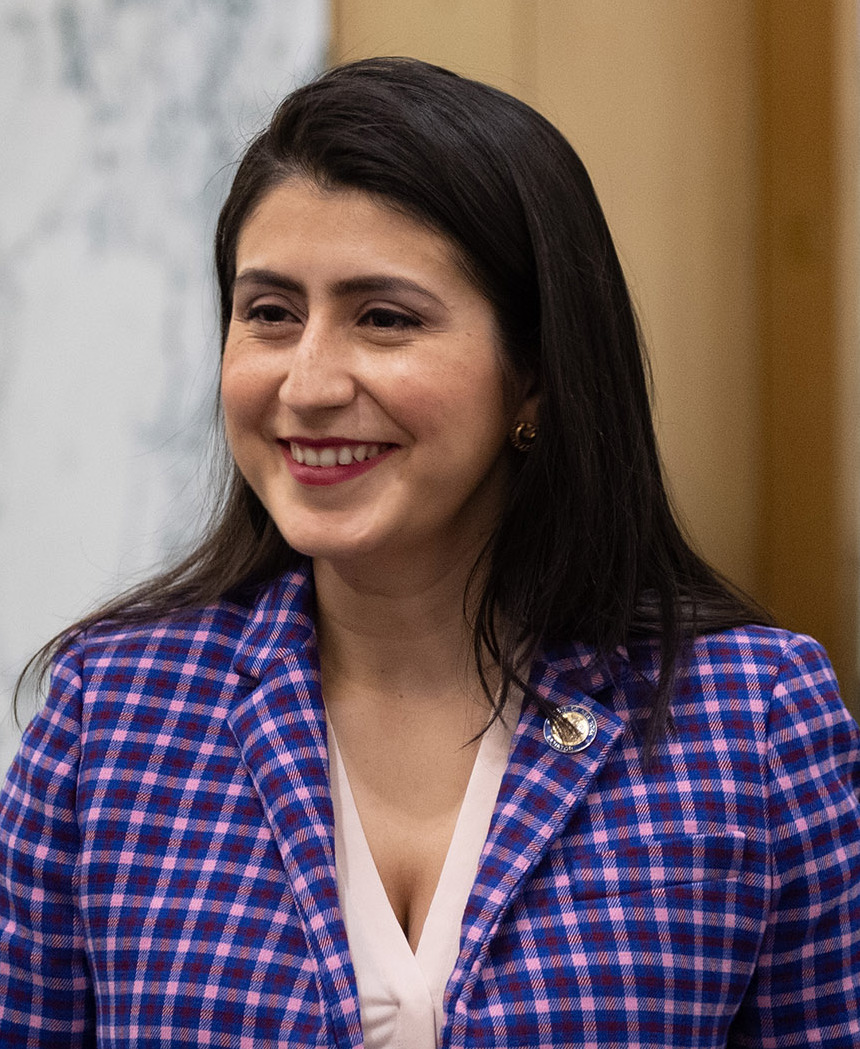
- Ramos in 2020

Member of the New York Senate from the 13th district
- Incumbent
- Assumed office January 1, 2019
- Preceded by: Jose Peralta

Personal details
- Born: June 27, 1985 (age 41) Queens, New York, U.S.
- Party: Democratic
- Children: 2
- Education: Hofstra University (attended)
- Website: State Senate website State Senate campaign website Mayoral campaign website

Jessica Ramos (born June 27, 1985) is an American politician from the state of New York. A Democrat, she has represented District 13, which includes the Queens neighborhoods of Corona, Elmhurst, East Elmhurst, and Jackson Heights, in the New York state senate since 2019.

Ramos was a candidate in the Democratic primary for mayor of New York City in 2025; her campaign began in September 2024. On June 6, 2025, she endorsed former Governor of New York Andrew Cuomo, but remained on the ballot. She placed ninth in the first round. Ramos was defeated for re-election to the State Senate in 2026, losing in the Democratic primary to Jessica González-Rojas. In August 2026, Ramos was charged with state campaign finance violations following an investigation into improper campaign expenditure tracking.

== Early life and education ==
Ramos was born at Elmhurst Hospital and raised in Astoria, Queens, New York City. She is the daughter of Colombian immigrants. Her mother worked as a seamstress. Exposed to civic life at an early age, Ramos learned the works of past Colombian activists while in grade school, and participated in community activities with the Colombian immigrant community's local civic groups. In the early 1980s, her father spent days detained after being arrested during an immigration raid.

Ramos graduated from the Academy of American Studies and attended Hofstra University, discontinuing her studies to work in the office of then-New York City Council Member Hiram Monserrate.

== Career prior to elected office ==
Ramos worked in New York City Hall where she was initially a communications adviser and ultimately became director of Latino media from April 2016 to December 2017. In this role, Ramos was the city's top Latinx spokeswoman and liaison to the Spanish-language press. Before joining city government, Ramos was the communications director for Build Up NYC, an advocacy organization for construction, building, and maintenance workers. She has also done communications work with a local chapter of the American Federation of State, County and Municipal Employees and a regional branch of the Service Employees International Union.

In her early 20s, Ramos and her friends were stopped and frisked by NYPD officers who suspected them of being sex workers. She credits this incident with helping her "start thinking about how society often casts aside people who engage in 'morally questionable' activity."

Ramos has served on Queens Community Board 3, and she was a Queens County Democratic district leader from 2010 to 2014.

== New York Senate ==
In January 2018, Ramos announced her candidacy for New York State Senate, challenging Jose Peralta, a former member of the Independent Democratic Conference, in the Democratic Party primary election. She campaigned as a progressive who would champion the rights of immigrants and women, and help unseat a candidate who caucused with Republicans. Ramos defeated Peralta and then won the general election, running on the Democratic and Working Families Party ballot lines. Her campaign was endorsed by New York City Mayor Bill de Blasio, The New York Times, and U.S. Senator Kirsten Gillibrand.

In 2020, Ramos defeated Diana S. Sanchez in the Democratic primary and Jesus Gonzalez in the general election to retain her seat. In 2022, she again won re-election, unopposed in the general election, and again in 2024.

In 2026, Ramos ran for reelection. She faced Democratic primary challengers 34th Assembly district State Assemblymember Jessica González-Rojas and former district 13 State Senator Hiram Monserrate. González-Rojas criticized Ramos' 2025 endorsement of New York City mayoral candidate Andrew Cuomo, while Monserrate criticized the current quality of life in the district. Ramos criticized González-Rojas for her support of Metropolitan Park and criticized Monserrate for his past corruption and assault convictions. As of mid-January 2026, Ramos' campaign trailed González-Rojas' in spending and in available cash. González-Rojas' campaign received endorsements that Ramos had received in previous campaigns, such as the Working Families Party of New York. In mid-June 2026, a new super PAC received an $850,000 donation from what investigative news organization New York Focus characterized as a "mystery donor" to spend on opposing Ramos and supporting González-Rojas in this election; New York Focus said that it appeared to be "New York’s biggest-ever donation to an independent expenditure committee focused on a single state legislative primary race". Ramos was defeated in the primary by González-Rojas.

=== Committees ===
In the Senate, Ramos serves as chair on the Committee on Labor, a role she immediately received upon first entering the Senate. She is a member of the following committees:

- Budget and Revenue Committee
- Cannabis Committee
- Commerce, Economic and Small Business Committee
- Corporations, Authorities and Commissions Committee
- Finance Committee
- Judiciary Committee
- State-Native American Relations Committee
- Transportation Committee
- Legislative Women's Caucus
- Select Majority Task Force on Diversity in the Judiciary
- Select Majority Task Force on Minority and Women-Owned Business Enterprises

=== Tenure ===
Ramos' Farmworkers Fair Labor Practices Act, passed in 2019, gave farmworkers in the state the right to overtime pay and unemployment benefits. Her advocacy also led to the Excluded Workers Fund being added to the fiscal year 2022 budget; this aided categories of workers (including many in the food industry) who had not previously been in groups eligible for COVID-19 pandemic relief. In January 2021, she and other lawmakers wrote to then-Governor Andrew Cuomo and the state health commissioner to ask that delivery workers be added to the group of people eligible to get COVID-19 vaccines.

In 2020, local lawmakers in the neighborhood of Corona, Queens rushed to warn residents of rumors of a "loot out" event, a threat that then did not materialize. Ramos publicly mentioned frustration with Assemblywoman Catalina Cruz's handling of the situation.

To support bars and restaurants that introduced delivery and to-go cocktail offerings during the COVID-19 pandemic, Ramos sponsored legislation, passed in 2021 and 2022, that eased retail permitting.

In 2023, Ramos criticized Governor Kathy Hochul's proposals to ease housing construction in New York because not all local labor unions supported the proposals. That same year, Ramos called for "good cause eviction" tenant protections to be included in any budget housing proposal.

New York State's 2024 budget included a version of Ramos' legislation to raise the statewide minimum wage. Ramos advocated successful legislation to peg the minimum wage to inflation (effective starting in 2027), to automatically increment the wage yearly to respond to increases in the cost of living. As chair of the labor committee, she also contributed to passing several other worker protection laws, such as paid sick leave for domestic workers. As of February 2026, Ramos advocated changes to the New York State and Local Retirement System (NYSLRS) pension tier system to increase equity between longtime employees and recent hires.

Since 2020, she has co-sponsored versions of Cecilia's Act, a bill to decriminalize sex work (bill formerly named the Stop Violence in the Sex Trade Act). The bill would uphold all felony anti-trafficking statutes that are designed to hold traffickers accountable, but would decriminalize consensual adult prostitution offenses.

In 2025, Ramos introduced the "Recourse Act," which would allow the New York State Governor to withhold state tax dollars if the U.S. President cuts federal spending the city relies on for supporting critical agencies, saying, "If Trump cuts our funding, then we will withhold our taxes."

Ramos supports the Access to Representation Act (ARA) and the Building Up Immigrant Legal Defense (BUILD) Act, which would improve access to legal representation for immigrants.

==== Metropolitan Park development ====
She is opposed to building Metropolitan Park in Flushing Meadows-Corona Park, an integrated resort next to Citi Field with a casino proposed by New York Mets owner Steven A. Cohen. New York state officials announced in April 2022 that they would issue three casino licenses in Downstate New York. Following this announcement, in 2023, Cohen proposed a redevelopment of the parking lot west of Citi Field.

In February 2025, the City Planning Commission voted in favor of approving zoning changes which would allow for the project to be built. The area is zoned as parkland and zoning changes are needed to allow the project to move forward. Neighboring community boards have also voted in favor of the proposed development. In March 2025, the New York City Council voted 41–2 to approve the zoning changes. Later that month, fellow state senator John Liu announced that he would introduce a bill to reclassify the zoning as commercial space. In late April 2025, a State Senate committee voted 4–3 to advance a bill allowing the Willets Point section of the park to be rezoned to permit commercial use. Ramos spoke on the Senate floor to oppose the bill, saying that casinos "extract wealth from working class communities. They prey on addiction and often displace the very people they claim to uplift." In May 2025, the bill passed both chambers of the New York State Legislature.

In September 2025, the proposal was unanimously approved by the local advisory committee, with the boardmember appointed by Ramos unexpectedly voting for the project. Later that year, the New York State Gaming Facility Location Board voted to approve the Metropolitan Park proposal, and subsequently the state Gaming Commission approved issuing the project a commercial casino license. clearing the way for the casino's construction.

== 2025 New York City mayoral campaign ==
On September 13, 2024, Ramos announced that she would run in the Democratic primary in the 2025 New York City mayoral election, challenging incumbent mayor Eric Adams. She called herself "the only candidate in this race that has already worked at City Hall and understands an interagency approach to administrating the city." She received support from organized labor, including United Auto Workers Region 9A, Teamsters Local 808, The Chelsea Reformed Democratic Club of New York, and Teamsters Local 804. Voting in the primary is done by ranked choice, and on May 29, 2025, the Working Families Party announced its fifth-choice ranked endorsement of Ramos.

By June 2025, her campaign had struggled to gain traction. It did not qualify for matching funds or for the second primary debate, and it had less than $10k cash on hand according to campaign finance reports. Politico's New York Playbook PM newsletter reported that the campaign actually had outstanding debts totalling over $250,000 due to a vendor dispute which had not yet been filed with the New York City Campaign Finance Board, which could result in thousands of dollars' worth of fines.

=== Cuomo endorsement and reactions ===
On June 6, 2025, Ramos endorsed former New York Governor Andrew Cuomo in the Democratic primary, while remaining on the ballot herself. The move surprised many, inasmuch as Ramos, considered a political progressive, had been one of the first elected officials to call on Cuomo to resign in 2021, and had previously compared Cuomo's mental state to Joe Biden's by opining that his "mental acuity is in decline". NYC journalists speculated that the endorsement could be a move aimed at giving Ramos a path to a high-level role in a Cuomo mayoral administration. Ramos said that she chose to endorse Cuomo because of her assessment of the race's dynamics and of "the type of leadership that is required when I need workers and I need immigrants protected", such as a mayor's ability "to work within the confines of the president’s delusions".

The Working Families Party, which had endorsed Ramos a week earlier, announced in a statement, "We are sad and disappointed that State Sen. Jessica Ramos has decided to endorse the candidate favored by Trump's billionaire donors. But we won’t be distracted by this desperate move"; however, it declined to state whether the group would rescind its fifth-place ranking for Ramos. United Auto Workers Region 9A, which had previously voted unanimously to endorse Ramos, announced that it would rescind its endorsement, stating in a release, "Opposing Andrew Cuomo is a non-negotiable for our membership." Jews for Racial and Economic Justice Action, the Jim Owles Liberal Democratic Club, state assemblymember Emily Gallagher, the Professional Staff Congress, state senator Gustavo Rivera, and Downtown Women for Change all announced that they would drop Ramos from their endorsement slates the same day.

Alexandria Ocasio-Cortez, who had left Ramos out of her endorsement slate the day before, reacted on Twitter by quote tweeting a video of Cuomo refusing to mutually endorse Ramos with "lol. lmao." while actress and former gubernatorial candidate Cynthia Nixon quote tweeted a previous post by Ramos critiquing Cuomo saying "I'm choosing to remember the Jessica Ramos who ran to break up the IDC, supported the women who were sexually harassed, remembered the people Cuomo sent to die in nursing homes & always called out Cuomo's corruption, mismanagement & lies. I’ll miss that Ramos, where did she go?💔"

=== Results and general election endorsement ===
Ramos placed ninth in the first and second rounds of ranked-choice voting in the primary, garnering a total of 4,294 votes with 0.4% of the vote.

In September 2025, asked in an interview whether Ramos would endorse Zohran Mamdani in the general election, she said that Mamdani "is now the Democratic nominee. So he is who Democrats should vote for."

=== Campaign expense charges ===
On August 21, 2026, the Manhattan District Attorney's office announced charges against Ramos related to campaign finance irregularities. Prosecutors alleged that her previous campaign committees improperly accounted for expenditures and failed to report outstanding campaign debts. Ramos denied any wrongdoing through a spokesperson.

== Personal life ==
Ramos has two sons, whom she co-parents with her ex-husband. They divorced, the process beginning in 2019. Ramos remarried in May 2025. Ramos, a "lifelong straphanger," uses public transit and says she has never had a driver's license.
