= Francisco Moya =

American politician

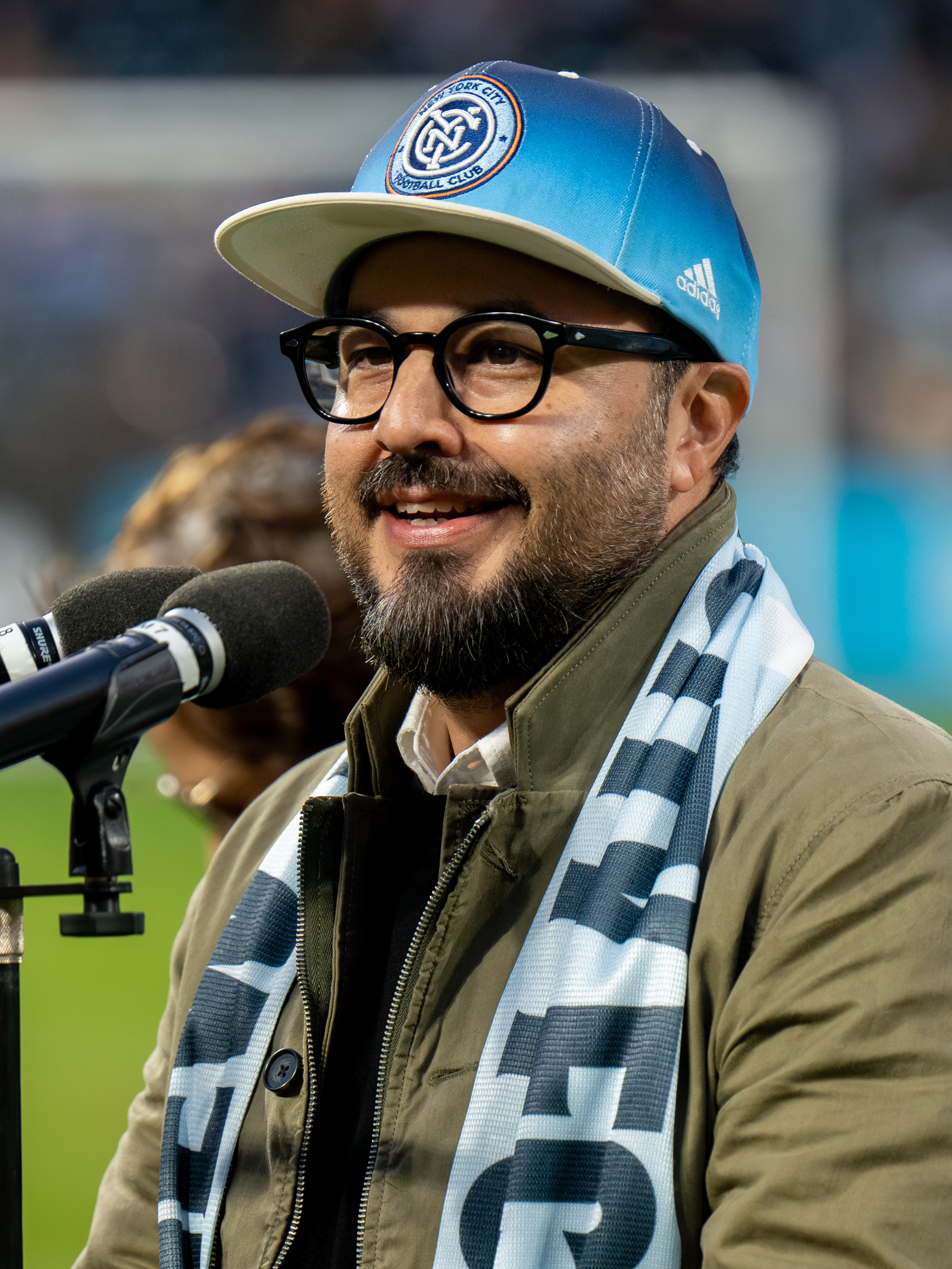

Member of the New York City Council from the 21st district
- In office January 1, 2018 – December 31, 2025
- Preceded by: Julissa Ferreras
- Succeeded by: Shanel Thomas-Henry

Member of the New York State Assembly from the 39th district
- In office January 1, 2011 – December 31, 2017
- Preceded by: Jose Peralta
- Succeeded by: Ari Espinal

Personal details
- Born: January 9, 1974 (age 52) New York City, New York, U.S.
- Party: Democratic
- Education: St. John’s University (BA); Baruch College (MPA)
- Website: Official website

Francisco P. Moya (born January 9, 1974) is an American politician from Corona, Queens. He served in the New York City Council from the 21st district from 2018 to 2025. He served in the New York State Assembly from the 39th district from 2011 to 2017. He is a member of the Democratic Party.

== Early life and education ==
Moya has a B.A. degree in Asian Studies from St. John's University and a Master of Public Administration degree from Baruch College.

Moya says he is the first state legislator of Ecuadorian descent, as he was elected to the New York State Assembly in 2010.

== Career ==
Moya's political background includes stints as an aide to Congresswoman Nydia Velázquez and to then-State Senator David Paterson. He has worked in public affairs for Cablevision and was formerly a director of business development at Elmhurst Hospital Center.

In September 2010, Moya was named one of The Capitol's "40 under 40".

=== New York State Assembly ===
Moya won a September 2010 primary election for State Assembly, defeating former State Senator Hiram Monseratte. Moya ran unopposed in the November 2010 general election for the 39th Assembly District in Queens, New York.

=== New York City Council ===
In 2017, Moya ran for New York City Council. His Democratic primary opponent was Hiram Monserrate, who had been defeated by Moya in a 2010 Democratic Assembly primary. Moya defeated Monserrate in the 2017 Democratic primary with 55% of the vote. In the general election, Moya was the only candidate and thus won election to the City Council.

Election history
Location	Year	Election	Results
NYC Council District 21	2017	Democratic Primary	√ Francisco Moya 55.07% Hiram Monserrate 44.27%
NYC Council District 21	2017	General	√ Francisco Moya (D) 98.97%

In 2021, Moya won the Democratic primary and then ran unopposed in the general election, winning a second term. Newly elected mayor Eric Adams lobbied for Moya, an ally, to become the council's speaker. However, council members instead elected Adrienne Adams as speaker.

Moya served on the following New York City Council committees:

- Cultural Affairs, Libraries, and International Intergroup Relations
- Finance
- Land Use
  - Zoning and Franchises (He serves as chair of this subcommittee.)
- Parks and Recreation
- For-Hire Vehicles
- Hospitals

As of December 2025 (at the end of Moya's second term), he had "no immediate plans to run for another elected office".
