= Thomas Manton (politician) =

American politician (1932–2006)

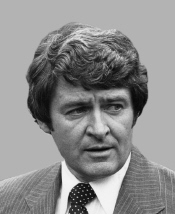
- Manton in 1997

Member of the U.S. House of Representatives from New York
- In office January 3, 1985 – January 3, 1999
- Preceded by: Geraldine Ferraro
- Succeeded by: Joe Crowley
- Constituency: 9th district (1985–1993); 7th district (1993–1999)

Member of the New York City Council
- In office 1970–1984

Personal details
- Born: November 3, 1932 New York City, U.S.
- Died: July 22, 2006 (aged 73) The Bronx, New York, U.S.
- Party: Democratic
- Education: St. John's University

Military service
- Branch/service: United States Marine Corps
- Battles/wars: Korean War

Thomas J. Manton (November 3, 1932 – July 22, 2006) was an American politician who represented the 9th and 7th congressional district of New York in the United States House of Representatives.

== Early life and education ==
Born in New York City, Manton was of Irish descent. He attended private Catholic schools and served in the United States Marine Corps during the Korean War from 1951 to 1953. Thereafter, he matriculated at St. John's University, where he earned a BBA degree in 1958 and an LL.B. degree in 1962.

== Career ==
=== Early career ===
Prior to entering politics, Manton was an officer of the New York City Police Department from 1955 to 1960 and served as a marketing representative for IBM from 1960 to 1964. After passing the New York bar exam in 1963, Manton worked as a solo practitioner from 1964 to 1984. He was elected to the New York City Council in 1970, also serving until 1984.

Manton ran in the Democratic primary for what was then a part of New York's 9th congressional district in northern Queens in 1978, following the retirement of 30-year incumbent James J. Delaney. However, he lost to assistant Queens County district attorney Geraldine Ferraro. Manton also ran against Delaney in 1972 and lost.

=== U.S. House of Representatives ===
When Ferarro gave up her seat to join Walter Mondale's presidential ticket, Manton entered the Democratic primary for the seat. In a hotly-contested primary, he defeated Clifford Wilson, Walter Crowley and Gloria D'Amico before narrowly defeating Republican Serphin R. Maltese in the general election with 52 percent of the vote. He was re-elected six more times.

Manton was elected chairman of the Democratic Organization of Queens County in 1986, succeeding John Sabini who had served as the interim chairman following the suicide of Donald Manes.

Tom Manton was the first major party chairman in the nation to endorse Bill Clinton for during the 1992 United States presidential election. As the co-chairman of the Ad Hoc Committee on Irish Affairs in the House, he was instrumental in obtaining a visa for Gerry Adams to travel to the United States. As a member of Congress, Manton served as a member of the United States House Committee on Energy and Commerce and was a subcommittee chairman of the House Government Operations Committee that supervised the United States Capitol Police.

His last vote in the House was to vote against the impeachment of President Bill Clinton.

=== Retirement ===
Manton retired from the Congress in 1998, having already filed for and circulated petitions for re-election. He withdrew on the last day it was legally possible to do so and arranged for his chosen successor, State Assemblyman Joseph Crowley, to replace him on the ballot. Crowley wasn't aware of this until Manton phoned him to tell him his name would be on the general election ballot. Crowley won the election and held the seat until losing in the 2018 Democratic primary to Alexandria Ocasio-Cortez.

Manton continued to serve as the Queens County Democratic Party chairman until his death. After leaving office, he joined the law firm of Manton, Sweeney, Gallo, Reich & Bolz in 1999.

== Personal life ==
After leaving Congress, he lived in the Queens neighborhoods of Woodside, later moving to Sunnyside, and finally to Astoria.

Thomas Manton died on July 22, 2006, following a battle with prostate cancer.

The Thomas J. Manton Post Office in Woodside, New York was named in his honor after his death. Also a 20 block stretch of Queens Boulevard in Queens, New York City was renamed Thomas J. Manton Boulevard.

== See also ==
Political offices
Preceded by Robert Berman	New York City Council, 12th District; 1970–1973	Succeeded by Michael DeMarco
Preceded by William C. Thompson Sr.	New York City Council, 21st District; 1974–1985	Succeeded by Walter McCaffrey
U.S. House of Representatives
Preceded by Geraldine Ferraro	Member of the U.S. House of Representatives from New York's 9th congressional district 1985–1993	Succeeded by Chuck Schumer
Preceded by Gary Ackerman	Member of the U.S. House of Representatives from New York's 7th congressional district 1993–1999	Succeeded by Joe Crowley
Party political offices
Preceded by John Sabini	Chairman of the Queens County Democratic Organization; 1986–2006	Succeeded by Joe Crowley
