= Shekar Krishnan =

American politician

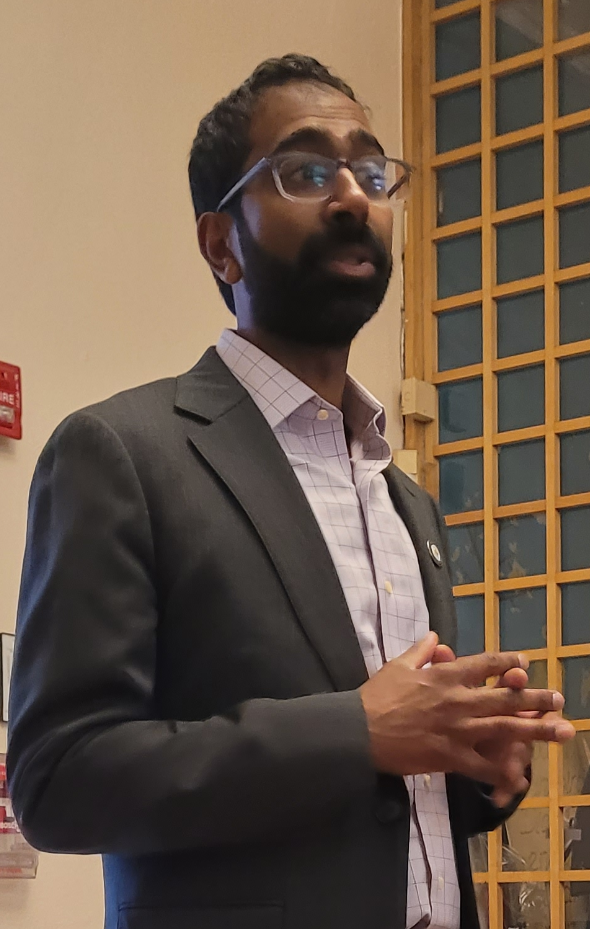
- Krishnan in 2026

Member of the New York City Council from the 25th district
- Incumbent
- Assumed office January 1, 2022
- Preceded by: Daniel Dromm

Personal details
- Born: June 5, 1985 (age 41) Hoboken, New Jersey
- Party: Democratic
- Education: Cooper Union (BS); University of Michigan (JD)
- Website: Official website Campaign website

Shekar Krishnan (born June 5, 1985) is an American attorney and politician who is a member of the New York City Council for the 25th district, which covers the northwestern Queens neighborhoods of Jackson Heights, Elmhurst, parts of East Elmhurst, and a small piece of Woodside.

== Early life ==
Krishnan was born in Hoboken, New Jersey to immigrant parents from Kerala, India.

He received a Bachelor of Sciences in engineering from The Cooper Union and a Juris Doctor from the University of Michigan Law School.

== Career ==
Krishnan worked as an associate for law firms Weil, Gotshal & Manges and Patterson Belknap Webb & Tyler. From 2014 to 2019, he was also an attorney at Brooklyn Legal Services Corporation A, directing the organization’s fair housing and tenant advocacy divisions.

In 2019, he cofounded and served as chief program officer for Communities Resist, a legal services organization that represents low-income tenants and neighborhood coalitions in fair housing litigation and anti-displacement advocacy in gentrified neighborhoods.

In the mid-2010s, Krishnan was the president of the New Visions Democratic Club, which had been founded by local Councilmember Daniel Dromm.

=== City Council campaigns ===
==== 2021 City Council campaign ====
Krishnan announced his candidacy in the 2021 Democratic primary for the 25th District of the New York City Council on November 17, 2020. Incumbent Councilmember Dromm was term-limited and could not run for reelection. Krishnan was endorsed by Dromm, U.S. Representative Nydia Velázquez, and State Senators Julia Salazar and John Liu. Seven other candidates also ran for the seat.

Krishnan centered his campaign on immigrant rights, the taxi medallion crisis, affordable housing, and climate justice. He supported the movement to "defund the police" and advocated "significantly reducing the NYPD's budget" to "redirect those divested funds to communities of color that have been overpoliced and denied countless city resources for years". He also advocated preserving the open street (closed to cars, open to pedestrians and cyclists) that had begun on 34^{th} Avenue in spring 2020, and turning it into a "linear park".

In March 2021, Krishnan faced accusations that he had engaged in union-busting during his time working at Brooklyn Legal Services Corporation A. Legal Services Staff Association 2320 President Sonja Shield and Association of Legal Aid Attorneys 2325 President Lisa Ohta circulated a statement saying that Krishnan had "played a leading role in quashing the Brooklyn A staff unionization drive" in 2018 and "urge[d] other unions not to endorse Krishnan, or to withdraw existing endorsements". But on April 9, Shield said she was not asking other unions to rescind their endorsements. As of late April, Krishnan was endorsed by several labor organizations such as United Federation of Teachers, Hotel Trades Council, NYC Central Labor Council, DC 37 AFSCME, 32BJ SEIU and 1199 SEIU.

The 2021 primary election was among New York City's first to use instant-runoff voting. Although opponent Yi Andy Chen had more first-choice votes (4,014) than Krishnan (3,915), Krishnan came from behind to win the primary with transfer votes in the seventh round of counting and eliminations, with 53.4% of all votes cast. He won the general election, against three opponents, with 60% of the vote. Along with Shahana Hanif, Krishnan is one of the first South Asians to serve in the New York City Council. Days after being elected, Krishnan was arrested along with Hanif and Assemblymember Zohran Mamdani for protesting alongside taxi drivers.

==== 2023 City Council campaign ====
Due to redistricting, Councilmembers elected in 2021 only served for two years, rather than four, then had the opportunity to run again in 2023 to retain their seats for another two-year term. Krishnan successfully ran to retain his seat in 2023, earning 62% of the vote and defeating Ricardo Pacheco and Fatima Baryab in the primary election, and defeating Zhile Cao and (again) Fatima Baryab in the general election. Krishnan had the endorsement of the Working Families Party.

==== 2025 City Council campaign ====
Krishnan successfully ran to retain his seat in 2025, defeating one opponent in the primary election and three opponents in the general election.

=== On City Council ===
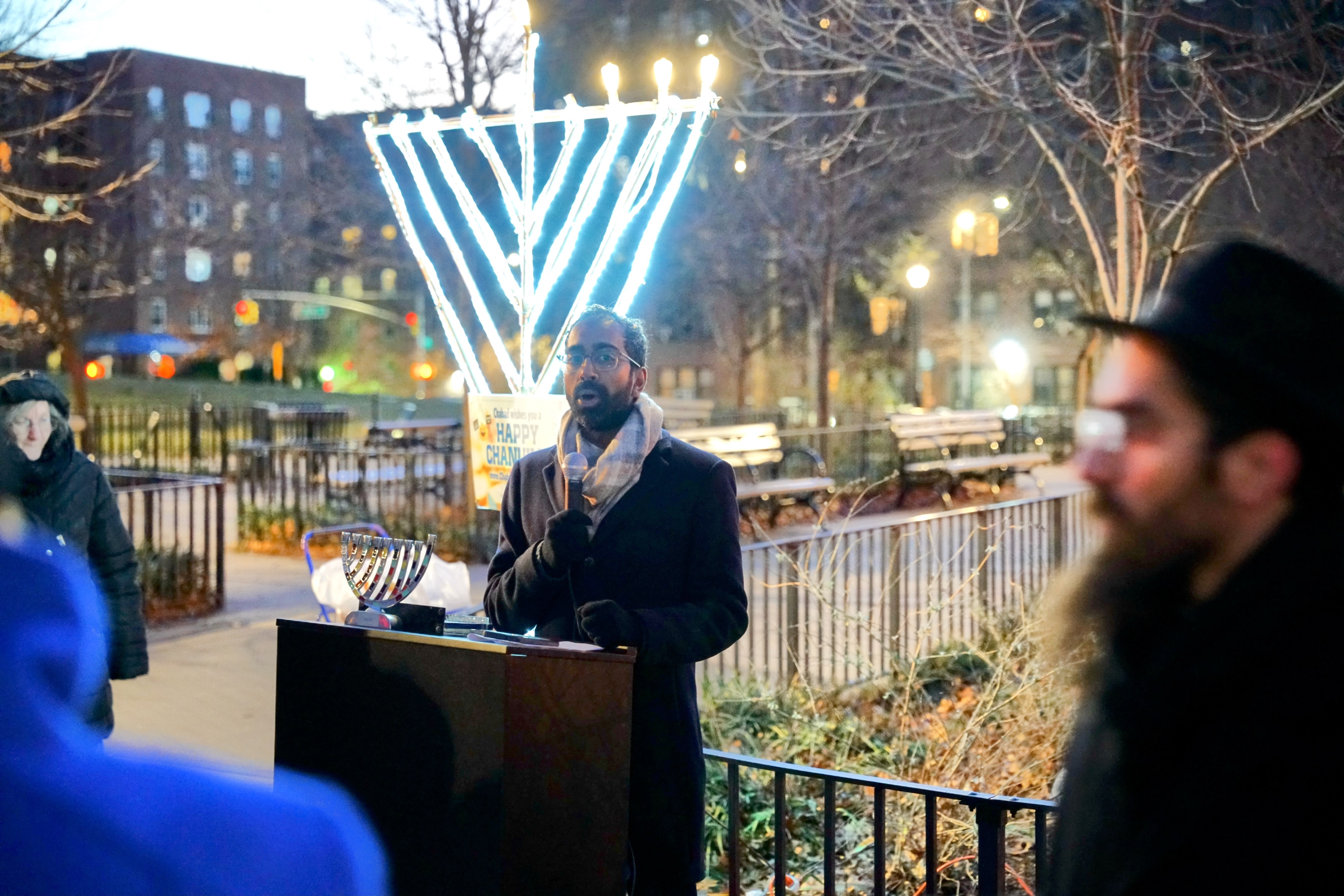
Krishnan speaks at a Channukah event in December 2025.

In his first (2021-2025) term, Krishnan chaired the Parks committee, and advocated increasing the city's parks budget. He said he aimed for Jackson Heights to have a "superblock" of public green space, as the area has "some of the least amount of open space in all of New York City".

In October 2022, protesters criticizing Krishnan's support of local Drag Story Hour programs vandalized his district office with graffiti. Anti-Drag Story Hour protesters then protested at his home in January 2023, writing on the nearby sidewalk and shouting "groomer" accusations at Krishnan while his children and wife were inside.

In June 2024, Krishnan's office organized a town hall meeting on the problem of illegal moped use in bike lanes and Paseo Park, and what the Department of Transportation ought to do to regulate micromobility.

In October 2024, Krishnan, with other members of the Council's Progressive Caucus, signed a letter urging Mayor Adams and the future police commissioner to "ensure that the recent leadership transitions and on-going corruption investigations do not impede accountability for the 2019 NYPD killing of Allan Feliz".

Krishnan introduced a bill to decriminalize street vending without a license. The City Council overrode a mayoral veto to approve the bill in September 2025.

Krishnan endorsed Zohran Mamdani in the 2025 New York City mayoral election. He was then a leading supporter of Julie Menin's successful bid to become Speaker of the City Council for the 2026-2029 legislative session, one of the first progressive Councilmembers to do so. Menin appointed Krishnan to chair the Investigations and Oversight committee, widely considered a powerful and prominent post. He stated that the committee's subpoena power was "a critical and underutilized tool in our arsenal" to fight corruption and "hold predatory corporations accountable", and that he aimed to "revive the subpoena power" to use it more than the Council had in recent years.

In early 2026, Krishnan voted for a bill regulating protest near religious institutions and placing responsibility for those restrictions under the NYPD's purview, but against a related bill (Intro 175-B) that would create a "buffer zone" limiting protest near educational institutions. The City Council passed 175-B, but Mayor Mamdani vetoed it.

== Electoral history ==
=== 2025 ===
2025 New York City Council Democratic primary, District 25
Party	Candidate	Votes	%
Democratic	Shekar Krishnan (incumbent)	9,965	67.2
Democratic	Ricardo J. Pacheco	4,758	32.1
Write-in		108	0.7
Total votes		14,831	100.0

2025 New York City Council election, District 25
Party	Candidate	Votes	%
Democratic	Shekar Krishnan	18,896	59.2
Working Families	Shekar Krishnan	3,371	10.6
Total	Shekar Krishnan (incumbent)	22,267	69.8
Republican	Ramses S. Frias	5,861	18.4
Conservative	Ramses S. Frias	557	1.7
Total	Ramses S. Frias	6,418	20.1
Safe&Affordable/Stop the Casino	Ricardo J. Pacheco	1,927	6.0
Asians United	Shah Shahidul Haque	1,199	3.8
Write-in		100	0.3
Total votes		31,911	100.0
Democratic hold			

=== 2023 ===
2023 New York City Council Democratic primary, District 25
Party	Candidate	Votes	%
Democratic	Shekar Krishnan (incumbent)	3,409	61.8
Democratic	Ricardo J. Pacheco	1,321	23.9
Democratic	Fatima Baryab	755	13.7
Write-in		31	0.6
Total votes		5,516	100.0

2023 New York City Council election, District 25
Party	Candidate	Votes	%
Democratic	Shekar Krishnan	4,981	54.9
Working Families	Shekar Krishnan	906	10.0
Total	Shekar Krishnan (incumbent)	5,887	64.8
Republican	Zhile Cao	1,829	20.1
Medical Freedom	Zhile Cao	95	1.0
Total	Zhile Cao	1,924	21.2
Diversity	Fatima Baryab	1,037	11.4
Write-in		230	2.5
Total votes		9,078	100.0
Democratic hold			

=== 2021 ===
2021 New York City Council Democratic primary, District 25
Party	Candidate	Maximum round	Maximum votes	Share in maximum round	Maximum votes First round votes Transfer votes
Democratic	Shekar Krishnan	7	6,352	53.4%	
Democratic	Yi Andy Chen	7	5,549	46.6%	
Democratic	Carolyn Tran	6	3,045	23.6%	
Democratic	Alfonso Quiroz	5	1,986	14.5%	
Democratic	Fatima Baryab	4	1,687	11.8%	
Democratic	Liliana C. Melo	3	1,041	7.1%	
Democratic	Manuel F. Perez	2	513	3.4%	
Democratic	William H. Salgado	2	282	1.9%	
Write-In		1	35	0.2%	

2021 New York City Council election, District 25
Party	Candidate	Votes	%
Democratic	Shekar Krishnan	9,466	61.1
Republican	Shah Shahidul Haque	2,987	19.3
Diversity	Fatima Baryab	2,555	16.5
Libertarian	Suraj Jaswal	415	2.7
Write-in		62	0.4
Total votes		15,485	100.0
Democratic hold			

== See also ==
- Indian Americans in New York City
