= Michael DenDekker =

American politician

Michael G. DenDekker
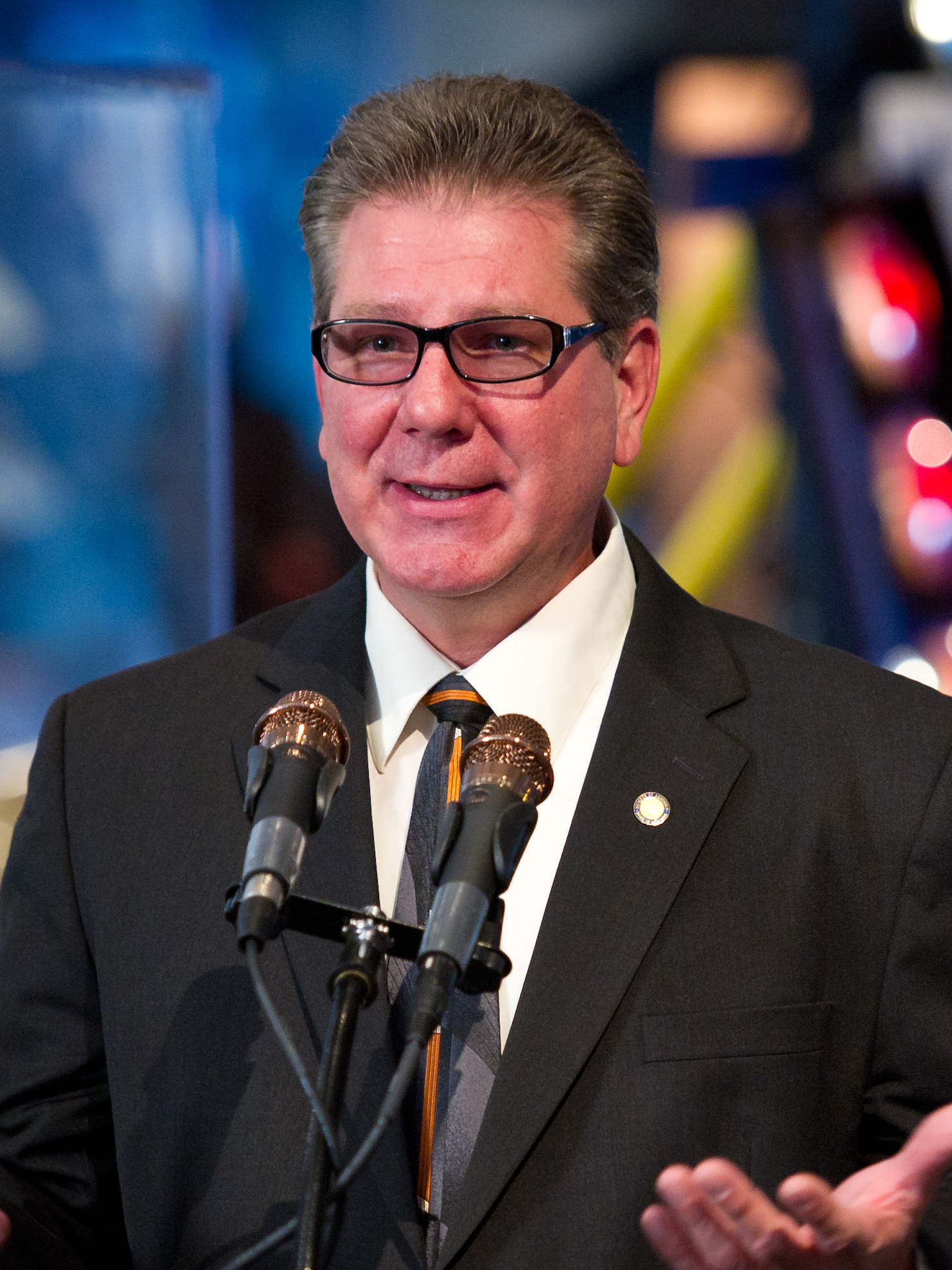
- DenDekker in 2012

Member of the New York State Assembly from the 34th district
- In office January 1, 2009 – January 1, 2021
- Preceded by: Ivan Lafayette
- Succeeded by: Jessica González-Rojas

Personal details
- Born: July 11, 1961 (age 65) Jackson Heights, Queens
- Party: Democratic
- Spouse: Angela
- Children: Four
- Profession: politician
- Website: Official website

Michael G. DenDekker (born July 11, 1961) is an American politician and former assemblyman for the state of New York's 34th district, which included the neighborhoods of Woodside, Jackson Heights, and East Elmhurst, all in the Borough and County of Queens.

== Education and career ==
DenDekker was born in Jackson Heights, attending Our Lady of Fatima Grammar School and Monsignor McClancy Memorial High School. He attended the State University of New York at Farmingdale, majoring in automotive technology.

After college he worked as a banquet manager for a caterer and an account representative for MetLife. He joined the New York City Department of Sanitation in 1995, where he was promoted to supervisor in March 2001. Later that year he was assigned to the New York City Office of Emergency Management as a public information officer and in 2003 he also became a special projects coordinator. He retired from the Sanitation Department and his assignment at OEM in 2006, after which he was a facilities manager for the New York City Council.

From 1998 to 2002, he worked as a part-time district representative for State Assembly member Margaret Markey. After longtime Assemblyman Ivan Lafayette decided not to run for reelection, DenDekker ran for the seat. He won uncontested general elections in 2008 and 2010.

== Legislative career ==
DenDekker attracted public attention with two bills he proposed in February 2011 that would have required all bicycles in New York to be registered, inspected, and given license plates for a mandatory US$25 fee. DenDekker proposed the idea as an attempt to draw attention to bicyclists who violate existing state laws and to generate revenue for the state. After significant objections from his colleagues, constituents and local clerks, DenDekker withdrew the bill.

In May 2010, DenDekker introduced a bill to develop a cigarette butt recycling program and require a minimum deposit of one cent per cigarette.

In 2020, he was defeated in the Democratic primary by democratic socialist opponent Jessica González-Rojas.

== Personal life ==
DenDekker and his wife Angela have four children: Michael, Linda, Elizabeth, and Jason. His step-daughter, Elizabeth Delaney, died on March 11, 2012. He has three grandchildren Jasen, Vincent, and Justin. He occasionally works as an actor, has appeared in several movies and TV shows—including the first two seasons of Elementary, as a Detective—and is a member of the Screen Actors Guild.

New York State Assembly
Preceded by Ivan Lafayette	New York State Assembly, 34th District; 2009–2020	Succeeded by Jessica González-Rojas (elect)
