= New York City's 25th City Council district =

- Boundaries following the 2020 census

Government
  - Council Member: Shekar Krishnan (D—Jackson Heights)

Population (2010)
  - Total: 161,419

Demographics
  - Hispanic: 36%
  - White: 28%
  - Asian: 27%
  - Black: 6%
  - Other: 3%

Registration
  - Democratic: 63.1%
  - Republican: 9.2%
  - No party preference: 25.1%
- Registered voters (2021) 85,768

New York City's 25th City Council district is one of 51 districts in the New York City Council. It is currently represented by Democrat Shekar Krishnan.

== Geography ==
District 25 is based in the northwestern Queens neighborhoods of Jackson Heights and East Elmhurst, and Elmhurst.

The district overlaps with Queens Community Boards 3 and 4, and with New York's 6th and 14th congressional districts. It also overlaps with the 12th, 13th, and 16th districts of the New York State Senate, and with the 30th, 34th, 35th, 36th, and 39th districts of the New York State Assembly.

== Recent election results ==
=== 2025 ===
2025 New York City Council election, District 25
Primary election
Party	Candidate	Votes	%
Democratic	Shekar Krishnan (incumbent)	9,965	67.2
Democratic	Ricardo Pacheco	4,758	32.1
Write-in		108	0.7
Total votes		14,831	100.0
General election
Democratic	Shekar Krishnan	18,896	
Working Families	Shekar Krishnan	3,371	
Total	Shekar Krishnan (incumbent)	22,267	69.8
Republican	Ramses Frias	5,861	
Conservative	Ramses Frias	557	
Total	Ramses Frias	6,418	20.1
Safe & Affordable	Ricardo Pacheco	1,927	6.0
Asians United	Shah Haque	1,199	3.8
Write-in		100	0.3
Total votes		31,911	100.0
Democratic hold			

=== 2023 (redistricting) ===
Due to redistricting and the 2020 changes to the New York City Charter, councilmembers elected during the 2021 and 2023 City Council elections will serve two-year terms, with full four-year terms resuming after the 2025 New York City Council elections.

2023 New York City Council election, District 25
Primary election
Party	Candidate	Votes	%
Democratic	Shekar Krishnan	3,409	61.8
Democratic	Ricardo Pacheco	1,321	23.9
Democratic	Fatima Baryab	755	13.7
Write-in		31	0.6
Total votes		5,516	100.0
General election
Democratic	Shekar Krishnan	4,981	
Working Families	Shekar Krishnan	906	
Total	Shekar Krishnan (incumbent)	5,887	64.8
Republican	Zhile Cao	1,829	
Medical Freedom	Zhile Cao	95	
Total	Zhile Cao	1,924	21.2
Diversity	Fatima Baryab	1,037	11.4
Write-in	Ricardo Pacheco	160	1.8
Write-in		70	0.8
Total votes		9,078	100.0
Democratic hold			

=== 2021 ===
In 2019, voters in New York City approved Ballot Question 1, which implemented ranked-choice voting in all local elections. Under the new system, voters have the option to rank up to five candidates for every local office. Voters whose first-choice candidates fare poorly will have their votes redistributed to other candidates in their ranking until one candidate surpasses the 50 percent threshold. If one candidate surpasses 50 percent in first-choice votes, then ranked-choice tabulations will not occur.

The 25th district hosted one of only three 2021 races in which the eventual winner did not receive the highest number of first-choice votes (the other two being the 9th and 50th districts).

2021 New York City Council election, District 25 Democratic primary
Party	Candidate	Maximum round	Maximum votes	Share in maximum round	Maximum votes First round votes Transfer votes
Democratic	Shekar Krishnan	7	6,352	53.4%	
Democratic	Yi Andy Chen	7	5,549	46.6%	
Democratic	Carolyn Tran	6	3,045	23.6%	
Democratic	Alfonso Quiroz	5	1,986	14.5%	
Democratic	Fatima Baryab	4	1,687	11.8%	
Democratic	Lili Melo	3	1,041	7.1%	
Democratic	Manuel Perez	2	513	3.4%	
Democratic	William Salgado	2	282	1.9%	
Write-in		1	35	0.2%	

An interactive map of District 25

2021 New York City Council election, District 25 general election
Party	Candidate	Votes	%
Democratic	Shekar Krishnan	9,466	61.1
Republican	Shah Shahidul Haque	2,987	19.3
Diversity	Fatima Baryab	2,555	16.5
Libertarian	Suraj Jaswal	415	2.7
Write-in		62	0.4
Total votes		15,485	100
Democratic hold			

=== 2017 ===
2017 New York City Council election, District 25
Party	Candidate	Votes	%
Democratic	Daniel Dromm	10,736	
Working Families	Daniel Dromm	1,460	
Total	Daniel Dromm (incumbent)	12,196	98.8
Write-in		147	1.2
Total votes		12,343	100
Democratic hold			

=== 2013 ===
2013 New York City Council election, District 25
Party	Candidate	Votes	%
Democratic	Daniel Dromm	9,923	
Working Families	Daniel Dromm	1,100	
Total	Daniel Dromm (incumbent)	11,023	99.6
Write-in		43	0.4
Total votes		11,066	100
Democratic hold			
