= Ivan C. Lafayette =

American politician

Deputy Speaker of the New York State Assembly
- In office Jan 2006 – Dec 31, 2008
- Preceded by: Clarence Norman Jr.
- Succeeded by: Earlene Hooper

Member of the New York State Assembly from the 34th district
- In office 1977 – December 31, 2008
- Preceded by: Joseph F. Lisa
- Succeeded by: Michael DenDekker

Personal details
- Born: 28 July 1930 Monticello, New York
- Party: Democratic

Ivan C. Lafayette (July 28, 1930 – October 4, 2016) was an American politician who represented the 34th District in the New York State Assembly, which comprises portions of Jackson Heights, Corona, and Elmhurst. He served as Deputy Speaker of the Assembly from 2006 to 2008.

== Life and career ==
Originally from Monticello, Sullivan County, New York, Lafayette attended schools in Brooklyn and graduated from high school in 1947. He received his B.A. from Brooklyn College in 1955 and moved to Jackson Heights, Queens, where he and his family have lived since 1956. He served in the United States Army from December 1952 to December 1954.

Lafayette was a member of the New York State Assembly from 1977 to 2008, sitting in the 182nd, 183rd, 184th, 185th, 186th, 187th, 188th, 189th, 190th, 191st, 192nd, 193rd, 194th, 195th, 196th, and 197th New York State Legislatures. He served in a variety of capacities both in government and within the Democratic Party, including as a former District Leader and New York State Democratic Committeeman. During his tenure in the New York State Assembly, he served in various leadership positions such as Speaker Pro Tempore and as the Chair of the Insurance Committee, where he spearheaded consumer protection legislation. He also served as the Chair of the Queens Delegation for many years, prioritizing and advocating for borough-wide needs. He did not seek re-election in 2008. Lafayette died on October 4, 2016, at the age of 86. A street co-naming proposal is underway by Councilmember Daniel Dromm to rededicate the corner of his former Assembly District office, at the northwest corner of 92nd Street and 34th Avenue in Jackson Heights, to be called "NYS Assemblyman Ivan Lafayette Way".

New York State Assembly
Preceded by Clarence Norman Jr.	New York State Assembly; Deputy Speaker; 2006-2008	Succeeded by Earlene Hooper
Preceded by Joseph F. Lisa	New York State Assembly; 34th District; 1977–2008	Succeeded by Michael DenDekker
