= Hiram Monserrate =

American politician (born 1967)

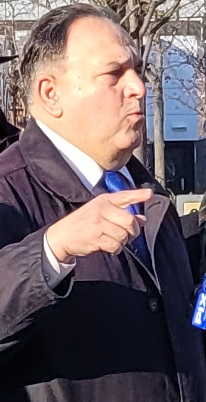
- Monserrate in 2025

Member of the New York State Senate from the 13th district
- In office January 1, 2009 – February 9, 2010
- Preceded by: John Sabini
- Succeeded by: Jose Peralta

Member of the New York City Council from the 21st district
- In office January 2002 – December 2008
- Preceded by: Helen Marshall
- Succeeded by: Julissa Ferreras
- Constituency: Queens: Corona, Elmhurst, East Elmhurst, Jackson Heights

Personal details
- Born: July 12, 1967 (age 59) New York, U.S.
- Party: Democratic
- Education: Queens College, City University of New York

Hiram Monserrate (Spanish pronunciation: [monseˈrate]; born July 12, 1967) is an American politician and ex-convict from the state of New York. A Democrat, Monserrate was a member of the New York City Council from 2002 to 2008 and a New York State Senator from 2009 to 2010. In 2009, Monserrate was convicted of misdemeanor assault following a domestic altercation in which his then-girlfriend suffered facial lacerations. In May 2012, he pleaded guilty to mail fraud and mail fraud conspiracy; he went on to serve 21 months in federal prison.

== Political career (2002–present) ==
=== New York City Council ===
Monserrate served on the New York City Council from 2002 to 2008, representing District 21 in Queens.

In June 2003, Mayor Michael Bloomberg announced an executive order allowing city employees to report illegal immigrants to federal authorities. Monserrate, then chairing the Council's Black, Latino and Asian Caucus, argued that this order would worsen relations between immigrant communities and the police. He responded by sponsoring a bill entitled "Access Without Fear", which would have forbidden city officials from revealing such information except as required by law. He joined director Stephen Frears in publicizing the immigration film Dirty Pretty Things to raise awareness of the issue.

In late 2008, Monserrate opposed Mayor Bloomberg's planned use of eminent domain in the $4 billion Willets Point Redevelopment project in Queens. The long-term project aimed to clear the 62-acre (250,000 m^{2}) industrial area, clear up pollution, and develop a hotel and convention center. However, it was initially opposed by a majority of the existing business owners. Monserrate changed his mind and supported the development after being assured that one-third of the housing would be "affordable" and that the city would offer businesses an opportunity to relocate. He told reporters the compromise showed that government "can be fair and still do good economic development".

==== Scientology controversy ====
Monserrate supported the New York Rescue Workers Detoxification Project, a project co-founded by Tom Cruise to deliver the so-called Purification Rundown (an unproven "detoxification" procedure created by L. Ron Hubbard as part of Scientology) to rescue workers affected by the September 11 attacks. Monserrate went through the program himself, and drafted official proclamations honoring both Cruise and Hubbard. He also attended a fund-raising dinner in New York for the project, as well as an event at the Scientology Celebrity Centre in Los Angeles. Monserrate dismissed medical authorities' criticism of the Purification Rundown, saying, "This is the same type of thing they said about chiropractors twenty years ago."

=== New York State Senate ===
In 2006, Monserrate ran for New York State Senate against fellow Democrat John Sabini, a 16-year incumbent. Monserrate came within 200 votes of pulling off an upset in one of the closest races in Queens.

In 2008, he again ran for the State Senate with the support of organized labor. Sabini withdrew from the race following his appointment to chair the New York State Racing and Wagering Board. Monserrate then ran unopposed and on November 4, 2008, was elected the New York State Senator for the 13th district.

On June 8, 2009, Monserrate and Pedro Espada (D-Bronx) joined Senate Republicans in an attempted parliamentary coup for the purpose of shifting control of the Senate to the Republicans; Monserrate, Espada, and all 30 Senate Republicans voted, 32-30, to replace Senate Majority Leader Malcolm Smith with then-Senate Republican Leader Dean Skelos and install Espada as Temporary President of the Senate. This action resulted in the 2009 New York State Senate leadership crisis. A week later, Senate Democrats appointed Senator John Sampson as their leader. On the same day, Monserrate rejoined the Democratic caucus, leaving the Senate in a 31-31 deadlock. With the office of Lieutenant Governor vacant due to Eliot Spitzer's resignation, the tie could not be resolved, and the resulting legislative deadlock continued until July 9, when Espada rejoined the Democrats.

On December 2, 2009, Monserrate voted against legislation allowing same-sex marriage, which failed to pass the Senate.

==== Expulsion from the New York State Senate ====
A bipartisan nine-member committee recommended disciplinary action against Monserrate following his 2009 misdemeanor domestic violence assault conviction. If Monserrate had been convicted of the felony charges against him, he would have been automatically expelled from the Senate. Politicians of both parties at the national, state, and local level called for him to resign or be expelled from the State Senate. The committee's report was released on January 14, 2010, and recommended that the full Senate expel or censure Monserrate.

On February 9, 2010, the State Senate voted to expel Monserrate. The vote was 53 to 8, with one senator not present. In response, Monserrate sued the State Senate in federal court. Monserrate lost his case on the District Court level and in the Second Circuit Court of Appeals.

=== Post-Senate political endeavors ===
Following Monserrate's expulsion from the Senate, Governor David Paterson called for a special election in the 13th Senate District to be held on March 16, 2010. Monserrate was defeated by Jose Peralta.

Also in 2010, Monserrate ran for the 39th Assembly District seat (Jackson Heights-Corona) vacated by Jose Peralta following his election to the State Senate. The Queens County Democratic Party endorsed community activist Francisco Moya for the seat. On September 14, 2010, Moya defeated Monserrate in the Democratic primary.

Monserrate unsuccessfully ran for Democratic District Leader for the 35th District in 2016 and for New York City Council in District 21 in 2017. In 2018, he was elected to a Democratic district leader post. He ran for Assembly unsuccessfully in 2020 and 2022.

In February 2021, the New York City Council passed a local law barring former lawmakers from running for municipal office if they have been convicted of corruption. The law was reportedly targeted at Monserrate, who had announced his intent to again run in the Democratic primary for his former seat on the New York City Council and was collecting campaign donations. Monserrate filed his nominating petition signatures the following month, but was blocked from receiving matching campaign funds by the city's Campaign Finance Board and from appearing on the ballot by the New York City Board of Elections. Monserrate filed a federal lawsuit, claiming that the law did not bar him from receiving matching donations and contending that keeping him off the ballot was unconstitutional.

In December 2025, Monserrate filed to run for New York State Senate in District 13 against incumbent Senator Jessica Ramos.

== Legal problems ==
=== 2008 assault charges ===
==== Arrest and investigation ====
Monserrate was arrested on December 19, 2008 and accused of slashing Karla Giraldo, his then-girlfriend, in the face with a broken drinking glass during an argument in his Jackson Heights apartment. He was charged with second-degree assault, a felony that carried a maximum sentence of seven years in prison. Monserrate pleaded not guilty.

Giraldo initially made statements to hospital staff and the police that led to Monserrate's arrest. However, Giraldo later changed her account to match that of Monserrate, stated that the cuts on her face near her left eye from a broken glass resulted from an accident, and added that she was no longer cooperating with the investigation. Sources discussed evidence with the media, including video surveillance that supported the charges of assault and Monserrate's attempt to cover it up. Her cuts required 20 stitches; for treatment, Monserrate drove Giraldo to a hospital 30 minutes' drive away, instead of going to a nearby hospital sitting within blocks of the incident.

==== Prosecution ====
Monserrate used political campaign funds to pay for legal help defending himself from assault charges. An aide to Monserrate later said that Monserrate had since repaid the money spent on legal bills to the campaign committee.

On March 23, 2009, a Queens grand jury indicted Monserrate on three counts of felony assault on Giraldo and three counts of misdemeanor assault. Monserrate denied the charges, saying

"Listen, the reality is that from the very beginning I have said this was an accident. My girlfriend said it's an accident. This is an accident and we look forward to the dismissal of all these charges based on the truth."

The case proceeded to trial, and Monserrate waived his right to a jury on September 18, 2009. As his trial started, security camera footage from Monserrate's apartment building was entered into evidence and made public. The footage showed Giraldo screaming and clutching at doorways as Monserrate forced her out of the building. Giraldo testified in Monserrate's defense.

==== Conviction and sentencing ====
On October 15, 2009, Monserrate was acquitted of the second-degree assault felony counts, but convicted on a third-degree assault misdemeanor count which carried a maximum sentence of one year in prison. On December 4, 2009, Monserrate was sentenced to three years' probation, 250 hours of community service, a $1,000 fine, and one year of domestic abuse counseling. He sought to vacate an order of protection preventing him from contact with Giraldo, but it was not vacated.

In an appearance before the sentencing judge, William Erlbaum, on July 7, 2010, Monserrate again petitioned to have a court order prohibiting him from contact with Giraldo vacated. The petition was granted, and according to the New York Post, Monserrate and Giraldo kissed and held hands. The pair later ended their relationship.

=== 2010 federal corruption charges ===
Indictment by United States in federal court case against Monserrate

In October 2010, Monserrate was indicted on federal corruption charges which alleged that, as a sitting member of the City Council, he had used staff members of a nonprofit organization—the Latino Initiative for Better Resources and Empowerment—to perform tasks related to his unsuccessful 2006 State Senate campaign. In 2006 and 2007, then-Councilmember Monserrate allocated $300,000 in discretionary city funding to LIBRE, and the indictment charged that approximately one-third of that funding went toward paying LIBRE staff for their campaign-related work. After the court proceeding, he was freed after posting a $500,000 bond, secured by a home belonging to his parents. Millions of dollars in so-called discretionary member items had been allocated by members of the City Council to non-profit groups with ties to the members. The investigation of Monserrate was part of a broad federal investigation to determine if these funds had been used for the members' personal or political expenses.

Monserrate was assigned a court-appointed attorney. In May 2012, Monserrate pleaded guilty to charges of mail fraud and mail fraud conspiracy. In December 2012, he was sentenced to serve two years in prison, and ordered to pay more than $79,000 in restitution.

In 2015, the U.S. Department of Probation informed Monserrate's judge that he had failed to make timely restitution payments. As of 2020, Monserrate had paid only $8,400 of the required restitution.

Monserrate served 21 months in federal prison.

== See also ==
- List of New York Legislature members expelled or censured
- Politics of New York (state)

Political offices
Preceded by Helen Marshall	New York City Council, 21st district 2002–2008	Succeeded by Julissa Ferreras
Preceded by Charles Fuschillo	Chairman of the Senate Committee on Consumer Protection; 2009–2010	Succeeded by Jose Peralta
New York State Senate
Preceded by John Sabini	New York State Senate, 13th district 2009–2010	Succeeded by Jose Peralta
