= New York's 13th State Senate district =

American legislative district

Senator
Jessica Ramos; D–East Elmhurst
- Registration: 68.4% Democratic; 7.9% Republican; 20.8% No party preference
- Demographics: 14% White; 6% Black; 61% Hispanic; 18% Asian
- Population (2017): 311,913
- Registered voters: 142,075

New York's 13th State Senate district is one of 63 districts in the New York State Senate. It has been represented by Democrat Jessica Ramos since 2019. Ramos defeated IDC-aligned incumbent José Peralta in the 2018 primary election; Peralta began his own Senate career by ousting Democratic incumbent Hiram Monserrate in a 2010 special election.

== Geography ==
District 13 is centered around the Queens neighborhood of Jackson Heights, and includes Corona, Elmhurst, East Elmhurst, and parts of Astoria and Woodside. The district office is located in East Elmhurst on Junction Boulevard.

The district overlaps with New York's 6th and 14th congressional districts, and with the 27th, 30th, 34th, 35th, 36th, and 39th districts of the New York State Assembly.

== Recent election results ==
=== 2026 ===
2026 New York State Senate election, District 13
Primary election
Party	Candidate	Votes	%
Democratic	Jessica González-Rojas	6,636	48.0
Democratic	Jessica Ramos (incumbent)	5,133	37.1
Democratic	Hiram Monserrate	2,000	14.4
Write-in		60	0.5
Total votes		13,829	100.0
General election
Democratic	Jessica González-Rojas		
Working Families	Jessica González-Rojas		
Total	Jessica González-Rojas		
Republican	John Healy		
Write-in			
Total votes			100.0

=== 2024 ===
2024 New York State Senate election, District 13
Party	Candidate	Votes	%
Democratic	Jessica Ramos	40,572	
Working Families	Jessica Ramos	7,795	
Total	Jessica Ramos (incumbent)	48,367	98.4
Write-in		810	1.6
Total votes		49,177	100.0
Democratic hold			

=== 2022 ===
2022 New York State Senate election, District 13
Party	Candidate	Votes	%
Democratic	Jessica Ramos	23,944	
Working Families	Jessica Ramos	4,257	
Total	Jessica Ramos (incumbent)	28,201	98.5
Write-in		427	1.5
Total votes		28,628	100.0
Democratic hold			

=== 2020 ===
2020 New York State Senate election, District 13
Primary election
Party	Candidate	Votes	%
Democratic	Jessica Ramos (incumbent)	19,525	85.5
Democratic	Diana Sanchez	3,257	14.3
Write-in		56	0.2
Total votes		22,838	100
General election
Democratic	Jessica Ramos	56,542	
Working Families	Jessica Ramos	6,343	
Total	Jessica Ramos (incumbent)	62,885	78.5
Republican	Jesus Gonzalez	15,467	
Conservative	Jesus Gonzalez	1,271	
Save Our City	Jesus Gonzalez	403	
Total	Jesus Gonzalez	17,141	21.4
Write-in		63	0.1
Total votes		80,089	100.0
Democratic hold			

=== 2018 ===
2018 New York State Senate election, District 13
Primary election
Party	Candidate	Votes	%
Democratic	Jessica Ramos	12,550	54.7
Democratic	José Peralta (incumbent)	10,362	45.1
Write-in		45	0.2
Total votes		22,957	100.0
General election
Democratic	Jessica Ramos	41,573	
Working Families	Jessica Ramos	1,886	
Total	Jessica Ramos	43,459	89.6
Independence	José Peralta	3,769	
Reform	José Peralta	766	
Women's Equality	José Peralta	404	
Total	José Peralta (incumbent)	4,939	10.2
Write-in		102	0.2
Total votes		48,500	100.0
Democratic hold			

=== 2016 ===
2016 New York State Senate election, District 13
Party	Candidate	Votes	%
Democratic	José Peralta	56,925	
Working Families	José Peralta	2,971	
Total	José Peralta (incumbent)	59,896	86.6
Republican	Jesus Gonzalez	8,007	
Conservative	Jesus Gonzalez	891	
Reform	Jesus Gonzalez	264	
Total	Jesus Gonzalez	9,162	13.3
Write-in		63	0.1
Total votes		69,121	100.0
Democratic hold			

=== 2014 ===
2014 New York State Senate election, District 13
Party	Candidate	Votes	%
Democratic	José Peralta	17,878	
Working Families	José Peralta	2,090	
Total	José Peralta (incumbent)	19,968	99.5
Write-in		107	0.5
Total votes		20,075	100.0
Democratic hold			

=== 2012 ===
2012 New York State Senate election, District 13
Party	Candidate	Votes	%
Democratic	José Peralta	47,855	
Working Families	José Peralta	2,038	
Total	José Peralta (incumbent)	49,893	99.8
Write-in		83	0.2
Total votes		49,976	100.0
Democratic hold			

=== Federal results in District 13 ===
Year	Office	Results
2020	President	Biden 75.1 – 23.8%
2016	President	Clinton 82.5 – 15.0%
2012	President	Obama 86.0 – 13.1%
2012	Senate	Gillibrand 88.2 – 10.6%
