= 2010 New York's 29th congressional district elections =

2010 New York's 29th congressional district election
- November 2, 2010
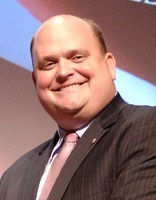

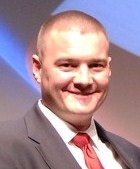
Nominee	Tom Reed	Matthew Zeller
Party	Republican	Democratic
Popular vote	105,907 (special); 112,314 (general)	80,480 (special); 86,099 (general)
Percentage	56.67% (special); 56.46% (general)	43.07% (special); 43.28% (general)
- County results Reed: 50–60% 60–70%
Representative before election
Eric Massa
Democratic
Elected Representative
Tom Reed
Republican

Two elections in New York's 29th district were held on November 2, 2010. The candidates vied to replace Eric Massa, who resigned the seat on March 8, 2010, as a result of health issues and allegations of sexual harassment.

The Governor called for a special election to be held simultaneously with the general election on the same day, with the special election determining who would complete the remainder of Massa's unexpired term in the 111th United States Congress (from November 2010 to January 2011) and the general election determining who would serve in the 112th United States Congress.

Republican Thomas W. Reed Jr., the former mayor of Corning, New York, defeated Democrat Matthew Zeller and write-in candidate Janice Volk.

== Background ==
Democrat Eric J. Massa won this district by 1.8 percentage points in 2008 over then-two-term incumbent John "Randy" Kuhl. The district leaned Republican (CPVI R+5), supported John McCain over Barack Obama in the 2008 presidential election by a 51–48 margin, and—accounting for redistricting—had been held by a Republicans for almost a century, except for Democrat Stan Lundine's time representing the area in the 1970s and 1980s. At the time of his resignation, Massa had raised over $600,000 in campaign funds. The NRCC targeted Massa for voting in favor of the Recovery and Reinvestment Act.

On March 3, 2010, following allegations of sexual harassment and reports that he had suffered a recurrence of cancer, Massa announced that he would retire at the end of his term. Massa later announced his resignation effective March 8.

On April 23, 2010, Steuben County Republican chairman Bill Hatch announced that he would file a lawsuit that, if successful, would force Governor David Paterson to acknowledge the vacancy and call a special election in the immediate future. Clause I.2.4 of the U.S. Constitution requires the governor of a state to issue a "writ of election" for any congressional vacancy. The judge hearing the case denied a motion from the Paterson administration to dismiss the lawsuit on May 13.

On May 12, 2010, Paterson announced that he would set the special election for November 2, 2010, and would not issue the required writ of election until October. Paterson's decision resulted in the general election and the special election occurring on the same day, with the winner of the special election serving until January 2011 and the winner of the general election serving from January 2011 until 2013. Furthermore, the redundant election complicated the primary election process; it was theoretically possible for either Reed or Zeller to be defeated in the primary election in mid-September, but to then remain on the ballot for the special election. In addition, state law dictates that special elections cannot be held for vacancies acknowledged after July 1, except in special circumstances. Following the announcement, Angelo Campini, who was challenging Reed in the primary election, stated that he would consider joining the lawsuit or filing one of his own over the date of the election if it resulted in him being pushed off the ballot.

Judge David Larimer issued a ruling in the case on June 4, 2010, officially acknowledging the vacancy but declining to compel Paterson to call a special election before November 2. The plaintiffs considered an appeal, but decided against it.

== Candidates ==
=== Democratic party ===
The Democratic Party chose Matthew Zeller, a 28-year-old CIA analyst who had not lived in New York since he had left for war, as their candidate. Zeller was an ROTC-trained Army officer who served in Afghanistan and holds master's degrees in international relations and public administration.

==== Nominee ====
- Matthew Zeller, former CIA analyst and Afghanistan veteran

==== Not running ====
- John Batiste, retired Major General
- Sandra Frankel, town supervisor of Brighton, former lieutenant governor candidate
- Mike Green, Monroe County District Attorney
- Shawn Hogan, mayor of Hornell
- David Koon, assemblyman
- Barbara Lifton, assemblywoman from Ithaca
- Michael McCormick, former Allegany County legislator, instead ran for State Senate and lost
- David Nachbar, Massa's 2008 primary opponent, Bausch & Lomb executive (speculated), instead ran for Assembly and lost to Sean Hanna
- Ellen Polimeni, mayor of Canandaigua
- David Rose, teacher in the Henrietta-Rush School District
- John Tonello, mayor of Elmira (speculated)
- Mary Wilmot, regional director for the Paterson administration, heir to the Wilmorite fortune, instead ran for State Senate and lost

=== Republican party ===
==== Nominee ====
- Tom Reed, former mayor of Corning

==== Not running or eliminated ====
- Angelo Campini, pizza shop owner from Henrietta Failed to deliver petitions to get onto the primary ballot. After proposing a write-in campaign, Campini bowed out on September 30, 2010, endorsing Reed.
- Janice Volk, Cuba resident, alpaca farmer and black conservative community activist Submitted 1,400 signatures to secure primary ballot, but those petitions were challenged. Though Volk later announced plans to seek a third-party line, she was unable to do so. Volk remained in the race through a write-in campaign.
- Maggie Brooks, county executive of Monroe County
- Brian Kolb, Minority Leader of the New York State Assembly
- Randy Kuhl, former congressman and state senator
- Catharine Young, state senator

=== Independence Party ===
- Tom Reed, Republican nominee

=== Conservative Party ===
- Tom Reed, Republican nominee

=== Working Families Party ===
- Matthew Zeller, Democratic nominee

== Campaign ==
=== Fundraising ===
At the time of Massa's resignation, the lone announced candidate, Tom Reed, had approximately $120,000 cash on hand. According to Reed, "in our last report, we raised $233,000."

As of the first quarter of 2010, Reed has raised $481,879 and had $287,222 cash on hand. As of July 2010, Volk had not yet raised enough funds to need to file with the Federal Election Commission, which would indicate less than $5,000 in fundraising and/or spending. Reed raised $686,449 by that point, approximately $100,000 from his own account, while Zeller had raised $137,885.

As of September 2010, Reed had raised $809,464 and had $361,315 in cash on hand. Zeller raised $232,425 and had $50,418 in cash on hand. With Reed heavily favored, he donated $75,000 of his campaign money to the National Republican Congressional Committee and the New York Senate Republican Committee less than one week before the election.

=== Endorsements ===
==== Tom Reed ====
- James Alesi, state senator
- James Bacalles, assemblyman and former mayor of Corning
- Amo Houghton, former representative
- Randy Kuhl, former representative
- Bill Paxon, former representative
- George Winner, state senator
- Catharine Young, state senator
- Angelo Campini, potential primary challenger
- Rochester Democrat and Chronicle
- Messenger-Post Newspapers (Canandaigua, NY)
- The Leader (Corning, NY)

==== Matthew Zeller ====
- Louise Slaughter, Member of Congress
- Shawn Hogan, Mayor of Hornell, NY
- The Buffalo News
- 1199SEIU United Healthcare Workers East
- Finger Lakes Times (Geneva, NY)

==== Janice Volk ====
- Jim Ostrowski, 1994 Libertarian Party gubernatorial candidate and WNY Tea Party Coalition Co-founder
- Amy McManus/Amy Mikolajczyk, talk show host on WLEA out of Hornell, NY and future Hornell city council candidate
- David Chamberlain, Village of Cuba, NY Mayor (1990–1995)

=== Polling ===
Poll Source	Date(s) administered	Tom Reed (R)	Matthew Zeller (D)	Undecided
Siena poll	September 21, 2010	44%	30%	26%
We Ask America poll	April 20, 2010	41%	24%	35%

=== Results ===
Reed won both elections by margins of 56.5% to 43.3%. Reed, for the first time since Amo Houghton in 2002, won every county in the district. However, he lost his home city of Corning, as well as the city of Hornell.

New York's 29th congressional district special election, 2010
Party	Candidate	Votes	%
Democratic	Matthew Zeller	74,021	39.61
Working Families	Matthew Zeller	6,459	3.46
Total	Matthew Zeller	80,480	43.07
Republican	Tom Reed	87,767	46.96
Conservative	Tom Reed	13,028	6.97
Independence	Tom Reed	5,112	2.74
Total	Tom Reed	105,907	56.67
Total votes		186,897	100

New York's 29th congressional district election, 2010
Party	Candidate	Votes	%
Democratic	Matthew Zeller	79,558	39.99
Working Families	Matthew Zeller	6,541	3.29
Total	Matthew Zeller	86,099	43.28
Republican	Tom Reed	93,167	46.83
Conservative	Tom Reed	13,505	6.79
Independence	Tom Reed	5,642	2.84
Total	Tom Reed	112,314	56.46
Total votes		198,940	100

By county for special election

County	Tom Reed Republican		Matthew Zeller Democratic		Write-in		Margin		Total votes
County	#	%	#	%	#	%	#	%	Total votes
Allegany	7,612	66.70	3,840	33.14	134	0.16	3,772	34.31	11,586
Cattaraugus	12,156	62.98	7,118	36.88	26	0.14	5,038	26.10	19,300
Chemung	12,224	54.21	10,326	45.79	0	0.00	1,898	8.42	22,550
Monroe (part)	36,339	53.46	31,599	46.48	39	0.06	4,740	6.98	67,977
Ontario (part)	16,064	58.89	11,206	41.08	10	0.03	4,858	17.81	27,280
Schuyler	3,114	56.13	2,430	43.80	4	0.07	684	12.33	5,548
Steuben	14,683	56.27	11,132	42.66	279	1.07	3,551	13.61	26,094
Yates	3,715	56.61	2,829	43.11	18	0.18	886	13.50	6,562
Totals	105,907	56.67%	80,480	43.07	510	0.05	25,427	13.60	186,897

By county for general election

County	Tom Reed Republican		Matthew Zeller Democratic		Write-in		Margin		Total votes
County	#	%	#	%	#	%	#	%	Total votes
Allegany	8,086	64.8	4,242	34.0	146	1.2	3,844	30.8	12,474
Cattaraugus	13,035	63.0	7,615	36.8	27	0.1	5,420	26.2	20,677
Chemung	13,050	53.9	11,162	46.1	0	0.00	1,888	7.8	24,212
Monroe (part)	38,604	53.2	33,961	46.8	40	0.1	4,643	6.4	72,605
Ontario (part)	17,016	58.7	11,972	41.3	8	0.01	5,044	17.4	28,996
Schuyler	3,307	56.6	2,528	43.3	4	0.1	779	13.3	5,839
Steuben	15,301	56.2	11,645	42.8	287	1.1	3,656	13.4	27,233
Yates	3,915	56.7	2,974	43.1	15	0.2	941	13.6	6,904
Totals	112m314	56.46%	86,099	43.28	527	0.26	26,215	13.18	198,940
