= Tom Reed (politician) =

American politician & attorney (born 1971)

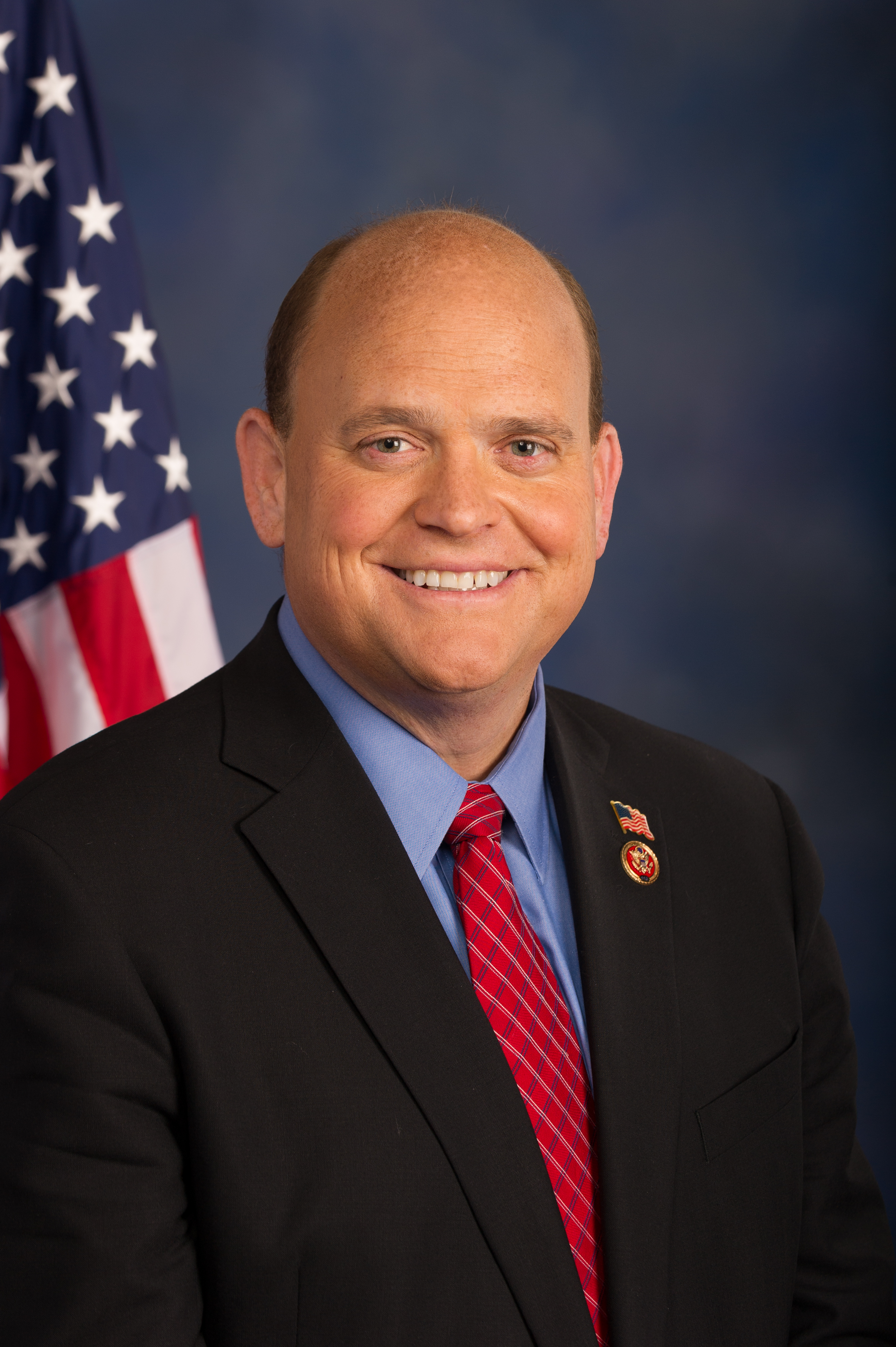
- Official portrait, 2013

Member of the U.S. House of Representatives from New York
- In office November 2, 2010 – May 10, 2022 (Note: Reed's official service begins on the date of the special election, while he was not sworn in until November 18, 2010.)
- Preceded by: Eric Massa
- Succeeded by: Joe Sempolinski
- Constituency: 29th district (2010–2013); 23rd district (2013–2022)

Mayor of Corning
- In office 2008–2010
- Preceded by: Frank Coccho
- Succeeded by: Rich Negri

Personal details
- Born: Thomas Willard Reed II; November 18, 1971 (age 54) Joliet, Illinois, U.S.
- Party: Republican
- Spouse: Jean Reed (m. 1996)
- Children: 2
- Education: Alfred University (BA); Ohio Northern University (JD)

Thomas Willard Reed II (born November 18, 1971) is an American lobbyist, attorney, and politician from the state of New York. Reed served as the U.S. representative for New York's 23rd congressional district; the district is in New York's Southern Tier. A Republican, Reed first joined the U.S. House after winning a special election to replace Eric Massa in 2010. He previously served one term as mayor of Corning, New York.

In 2021, after being accused of sexual misconduct, Reed announced that he would not seek reelection to the House of Representatives, or seek any other office in 2022. On May 10, 2022, he resigned from the House about seven months before the end of his final term.

== Early life and education ==
Born in Joliet, Illinois, Reed grew up in Corning, New York, the youngest of 12 children. He received a B.A. degree in political science from Alfred University in 1993 and a Juris Doctor from the Claude W. Pettit College of Law at Ohio Northern University in 1996.

== Early career ==
After graduating from law school, Reed worked as an associate in the law firm of Gallo & Iacovangelo in Rochester from 1996 to 1999.

After Reed's mother died in 1998, he returned to Corning and opened the Law Office of Thomas W. Reed. The firm specialized in debt collection. In 2007, Reed ran for mayor of Corning. On the ballot, he represented the Republican, Conservative, and Independence parties. He defeated incumbent Frank Coccho, 58% to 42%, and served one two-year term.

After his election to Congress in 2010, Reed resisted congressional rules that required him to remove his name from the firm. In 2014, the firm changed its name to RR Resource Recovery. At the same time, Reed's campaign stated that he was no longer involved with the firm.

== U.S. House of Representatives ==
=== Elections ===
==== 2010 ====
In 2009, Reed announced that he would run against incumbent Democrat Eric Massa in the 29th Congressional District in the 2010 election. Midway through his first term in Congress, Massa announced that he would not seek reelection due to health problems. In March 2010, Massa resigned from Congress after it was revealed that he was under investigation by the United States House Committee on Ethics for allegedly sexually harassing a staffer.

In the election to replace Massa, Reed faced Democratic and Working Families Party nominee Matthew Zeller. Reed was endorsed by Monroe County Executive Maggie Brooks and every county Republican chairman in the 29th District.

Reed won the election with 56.3% of the vote to Zeller's 43.7%, and immediately took office. In the days after the election, he suffered a pulmonary embolism. After a three-day delay, he was sworn in on his 39th birthday, November 18, 2010, during a special ceremony.

==== 2012 ====
New York lost two seats in the U.S. House due to population change. The 29th Congressional District was eliminated and much of the district became the 23rd Congressional District. The new 23rd District included Allegany, Cattaraugus, Chemung, Ontario, Schuyler, and Steuben counties from the old 29th District, and added Chautauqua, Seneca, Tompkins, and Tioga counties. Three candidates, Leslie Danks Burke, Melissa Dobson and Tompkins County legislator Nate Shinagawa entered the Democratic primary to challenge Reed in the new 23rd District. Shinagawa won the Democratic nomination and also was nominated by the Working Families Party.

During the campaign, Reed said that he accidentally paid one of his tax bills using campaign funds. Reed's campaign voluntarily reported the error in a campaign finance report and Reed reimbursed the campaign.

Reed defeated Shinagawa in the general election, 51.9% to 48.1%.

==== 2014 ====
Reed faced the Democratic nominee, Tompkins County Legislative Chair Martha Robertson. Though it was predicted to be a close race, Reed won with 57.7% of the vote to Robertson's 35.9%.

==== 2016 ====
Reed was unopposed in the Republican primary. He initially endorsed Jeb Bush for president before Bush left the race. He then endorsed Donald Trump on March 16. Reed reaffirmed his support for Trump in August.

In the November general election, Reed faced John Plumb, the only Democrat to file for the race. Reed was reelected with 58.1% of the vote to Plumb's 41.9%.

==== 2018 ====
Reed ran unopposed in the Republican primary before facing Democratic nominee Tracy Mitrano in the general election. Reed was reelected with 54.2% of the vote to Mitrano's 45.8%.

==== 2020 ====
In a rematch of the 2018 election, Reed defeated Mitrano by a wide margin.

=== Tenure ===
Reed has served on the House Judiciary Committee, House Committee on Transportation and Infrastructure, House Committee on Rules and House Ways and Means Committee.

In 2012, Reed focused on ending government spending and supported budget amendments that eliminated government funding, such as a sewer system in Tijuana, Mexico. He voted to repeal the Patient Protection and Affordable Care Act, and supported the Budget Control Act of 2011.

After his reelection in 2012, Reed drafted the Promoting Assistance with Transitional Help Act. The bill would have modified the Temporary Assistance for Needy Family program by setting a five-year limit on welfare payments to individuals.

With a government shutdown looming in September 2013, Reed introduced the Pay Our Veterans and Seniors First Act. The legislation would ensure that armed services members were paid and that seniors continued receiving benefits during a temporary government shutdown. The bill also proposed that members of Congress and the president forfeit their salaries for the duration of the shutdown.

In February 2014, Reed introduced the Clinical Trial Cancer Mission 2020 Act. The bill would have mandated that researchers publish all information from cancer clinical trials, with the goal to get more researchers to work together and bring down the number of duplicative studies. The legislation would have created a national clearinghouse run by the NIH.

In May 2014, Reed introduced a bill that would amend the Internal Revenue Code to permanently extend and expand certain expired provisions that provided an enhanced tax deduction for businesses that donated their food inventory to charitable organizations. Reed argued that it made sense to make this a permanent measure because "doing it on a temporary basis ... is part of the problem. We need to make this sound policy permanent in the tax code and I'm optimistic we'll get it to the finish and allow people to take advantage of the tax deduction that would encourage them to use the food rather than put it in a landfill."

On May 4, 2017, Reed voted to repeal the Patient Protection and Affordable Care Act (Obamacare) and passing the American Health Care Act.

Reed was ranked as the 32nd most bipartisan member of the House during the 114th United States Congress, and the seventh most bipartisan member of the House from New York, in the Bipartisan Index created by The Lugar Center and the McCourt School of Public Policy. In the 115th United States Congress, Reed voted in line with President Trump's position 96.7% of the time.

Reed sits on the House Way and Means Committee, which is in charge of tax legislation, and was one of only two House members from New York (along with Chris Collins) to support the provision in the 2017 Republican tax overhaul bill that eliminated the federal tax deduction for state income taxes. New York Governor Andrew Cuomo called the two lawmakers "the Benedict Arnolds of their time", claiming that the loss of the deduction would cost New York taxpayers nearly $15 billion and do grave damage to the state. Reed voted for the bill.

In 2019, Reed became the first House Republican in the new Congress to support a House rules change package authored by Democrats. Becoming the first member to "break ranks for a full rules proposal" in 18 years, he argued, according to his spokesman, that "real reforms were necessary that could actually bring legislation to the floor". The change intends to "lessen the sharp partisan divide in the House, in part by making it easier for rank-and-file members to bring their own bills onto the floor for a vote."

On September 19, 2019, Reed suddenly lost consciousness for approximately 30 seconds while waiting to conduct a television interview. He was revived and hospitalized.

Following the storming of the U.S. Capitol on January 6, 2021, Reed wrote in the New York Times that while Trump could and should be held accountable, impeachment was not appropriate.

On May 19, 2021, Reed was one of 35 Republicans to join all Democrats in voting to approve legislation to establish the January 6 commission meant to investigate the storming of the U.S. Capitol.

In June 2021, Reed was one of 49 House Republicans to vote to repeal the AUMF against Iraq. On November 5, 2021, Reed was one of 13 House Republicans to break with their party and vote with a majority of Democrats in favor of the Infrastructure Investment and Jobs Act.

In 2022, Reed was one of six Republicans to vote for the Global Respect Act, which imposes sanctions on foreign persons responsible for violations of the internationally recognized human rights of lesbian, gay, bisexual, transgender, queer, and intersex (LGBTQI) people, and for other purposes.

=== Sexual misconduct allegation and resignation ===
On March 19, 2021, Nicolette Davis alleged in The Washington Post that Reed had rubbed her back, unhooked her bra, and inched his hand up her thigh at an Irish pub in Minnesota in 2017 when she worked as a junior insurance company lobbyist. Reed denied the allegation. Two days later, on March 21, 2021, he apologized to Davis, saying he still did not recall the incident in question but considered her story possible, since he had been battling alcoholism at the time. In the same statement, he said would not seek reelection in 2022. Reed later noted that he had briefly considered running for further office anyway and felt pressured by political consultants who had advised him to admit nothing and deny everything; he still said he did not remember assaulting Davis on the night in question.

On May 10, 2022, Reed resigned from Congress, leaving office more than seven months before the end of his term. He has accepted a position with Prime Policy Group, the lobbying arm of Burson Cohn & Wolfe.

=== Committee assignments ===
- Committee on Ways and Means
  - Subcommittee on Oversight
  - Subcommittee on Human Resources
  - Subcommittee on Select Revenue Measures

=== Caucus memberships ===
- Problem Solvers Caucus (co-chair)
- Republican Study Committee
- Republican Main Street Partnership
- Natural Gas Caucus (co-chair)
- House Manufacturing Caucus (co-chair)
- Congressional Diabetes Caucus (vice chair)
- Private Property Rights Caucus (chair/founder)
- Bipartisan Climate Solutions Caucus
- Republican Governance Group
- Congressional Constitution Caucus
- Congressional NextGen 9-1-1 Caucus

== 2022 New York gubernatorial election ==
Reed had been mentioned as a potential candidate for governor of New York in 2022. In a February 4, 2021, conference call with reporters, he said, "Governor Cuomo, Your days are numbered. There's leadership coming to Albany very soon". On March 21, 2021, after allegations of sexual misconduct by a lobbyist, he announced that he would not seek elected office in 2022.

== Electoral history ==
Mayor of Corning, 2007
Party	Candidate	Votes	%
Republican	Tom Reed	1,866	58
Democratic	Frank Coccho (Inc.)	1,317	42
Total votes		3,220	100

New York's 23rd congressional district election, 2010
Party	Candidate	Votes	%
Republican	Tom Reed	101,209	56.3
Democratic	Matthew Zeller	78,578	43.7
Total votes		179,787	100

New York's 23rd congressional district election, 2012
Party	Candidate	Votes	%
Republican	Tom Reed	126,519	51.9
Democratic	Nate Shinagawa	117,055	48.1
Total votes		243,571	100

New York's 23rd congressional district election, 2014
Party	Candidate	Votes	%
Republican	Tom Reed	113,130	57.7
Democratic	Martha Robertson	70,242	35.9
N/A	Blank/Void/Scattering	12,502	6.4
Total votes		195,874	100

New York's 23rd congressional district election, 2016
Party	Candidate	Votes	%
Republican	Tom Reed	149,779	58.1
Democratic	John Plumb	107,822	41.9
Total votes		257,601	100

New York's 23rd congressional district election, 2018
Party	Candidate	Votes	%
Republican	Tom Reed	130,323	54.2
Democratic	Tracy Mitrano	109,932	45.8
Total votes		240,255	100

New York's 23rd congressional district election, 2020
Party	Candidate	Votes	%
Republican	Tom Reed	181,060	57.7
Democratic	Tracy Mitrano	129,014	41.1
Total votes		313,842	100

== See also ==
- List of mayors of Corning, New York

== Notes ==
U.S. House of Representatives
Preceded by Eric Massa	Member of the U.S. House of Representatives from New York's 29th congressional district 2010–2013	Constituency abolished
Preceded by Bill Owens	Member of the U.S. House of Representatives from New York's 23rd congressional district 2013–2022	Succeeded by Joe Sempolinski
Party political offices
Preceded by Reid Ribble	Republican Co-Chair of the Problem Solvers Caucus; 2015–2021; Served alongside: Kurt Schrader, Josh Gottheimer	Succeeded by Brian Fitzpatrick
U.S. order of precedence (ceremonial)
Preceded by Thomas M. Reynolds as Former U.S. Representative	Order of precedence of the United States as Former U.S. Representative	Succeeded by Sean Patrick Maloney as Former U.S. Representative
