= 2006 United States House of Representatives elections in New York =

- November 7, 2006

All 29 New York seats to the United States House of Representatives elections
	Majority party	Minority party
Party	Democratic	Republican
Seats before	20	9
Seats won	23	6
Seat change	▲3	▼3

Democratic
50–60%
60–70%
70–80%
80–90%
90–100%
Republican
40–50%
50–60%
60–70%
70–80%

On November 7, 2006, New York, along with the rest of the country held elections for the United States House of Representatives. Democrats picked up 3 House seats, the 19th, the 20th, and the 24th.

In federal elections, New York has consistently handed its vote to Democratic candidates. Of New York's twenty-nine congressional districts, all but ten are centered on heavily liberal and Democratic New York City and its surrounding suburbs, including Long Island and Westchester County. In 2002, a reapportionment was conducted and was planned as what is described as "a bipartisan incumbent protection plan". The primary was held on September 12, 2006. On September 11, the New York Times reported that Democrats were becoming less optimistic they could win Republican-held House seats in New York this year. However, this was not the case as three districts elected Democrats over their Republican challengers, two of them incumbents.

== Overview ==
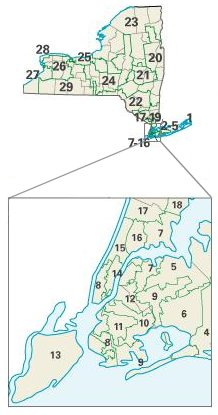
New York congressional districts

District	Incumbent	Party	Elected	Outcome	Opponent
1	Tim Bishop	Democrat	2002	Reelected	Tim Bishop (D) 62.2% Italo Zanzi (R) 37.8%
2	Steve Israel	Democrat	2000	Reelected	Steve Israel (D) 70.4% (R) 29.6%
3	Peter King	Republican	1992	Reelected	Peter King (R) 56.0% David Mejias (D) 44.0%
4	Carolyn McCarthy	Democrat	1996	Reelected	Carolyn McCarthy (D) 64.9% Martin Blessinger (R) 35.1%
5	Gary Ackerman	Democrat	1983	Reelected	Gary Ackerman (D) unopposed
6	Gregory Meeks	Democrat	1998	Reelected	Gregory Meeks (D) unopposed
7	Joseph Crowley	Democrat	1998	Reelected	Joseph Crowley (D) 84.0% Kevin Brawley (R) 16.0%
8	Jerrold Nadler	Democrat	1992	Reelected	Jerrold Nadler (D) 85.0% Eleanor Friedman (R) 13.6% Dennis Adornato (Cons) 1.4%
9	Anthony Weiner	Democrat	1998	Reelected	Anthony Weiner (D) unopposed
10	Ed Towns	Democrat	1982	Reelected	Ed Towns (D) 92.2% Jonathan Anderson (R) 5.9% Ernest Johnson (Cons) 1.9%
11	Major Owens	Democrat	1982	Incumbent Retired; Democrat Hold	Yvette Clarke (D) 90.0% Stephen Finger (R) 7.6% Mariana Blume (Cons) 1.4% Ollie McClean (Freedom) 1.0%
12	Nydia Velázquez	Democrat	1992	Reelected	Nydia Velázquez (D) 89.7% Allan Romaguera (R) 10.3%
13	Vito Fossella	Republican	1997	Reelected	Vito Fossella (R) 56.8% Steve Harrison (D) 43.2%
14	Carolyn Maloney	Democrat	1992	Reelected	Carolyn Maloney (D) 84.5% Danniel Maio (R) 15.5%
15	Charles Rangel	Democrat	1970	Reelected	Charles Rangel (D) 94.0% Edward Daniels (R) 6.0%
16	Jose Serrano	Democrat	1990	Reelected	Jose Serrano (D) 95.3% Ali Mohamed (R) 4.7%
17	Eliot Engel	Democrat	1988	Reelected	Eliot Engel (D) 76.4% Jim Faulkner (R) 23.6%
18	Nita Lowey	Democrat	1988	Reelected	Nita Lowey (D) 70.7% Richard A. Hoffman (R) 29.3%
19	Sue Kelly	Republican	1994	Incumbent Defeated; Democrat Gain	John Hall (D) 51.2% Sue Kelly (R) 48.8%
20	John Sweeney	Republican	1998	Incumbent Defeated; Democrat Gain	Kirsten Gillibrand (D) 53.1% John Sweeney (R) 46.9%
21	Mike McNulty	Democrat	1988	Reelected	Mike McNulty (D) 78.2% Warren Redlich (R) 21.8%
22	Maurice Hinchey	Democrat	1992	Reelected	Maurice Hinchey (D) unopposed
23	John McHugh	Republican	1992	Reelected	John McHugh (R) 63.1% Robert Johnson (D) 36.9%
24	Sherwood Boehlert	Republican	1982	Incumbent Retired; Democrat Gain	Mike Arcuri (D) 53.9% Ray Meier (R) 45.0% Mike Sylvia (L) 1.1%
25	Jim Walsh	Republican	1988	Reelected	Jim Walsh (R) 50.8% Dan Maffei (D) 49.2%
26	Tom Reynolds	Republican	1998	Reelected	Tom Reynolds (R) 52.0% Jack Davis (D) 48.0%
27	Brian Higgins	Democrat	2004	Reelected	Brian Higgins (D) 79.3% Michael McHale (R) 20.7%
28	Louise Slaughter	Democrat	1986	Reelected	Louise Slaughter (D) 73.2% John Donnelly (R) 26.8%
29	Randy Kuhl	Republican	2004	Reelected	Randy Kuhl (R) 51.5% Eric Massa (D) 48.5%

== District 1 ==
2006 New York's 1st congressional district election
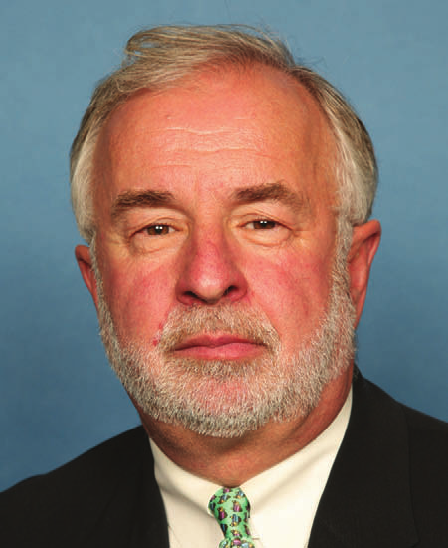

Nominee	Tim Bishop	Italo Zanzi
Party	Democratic	Republican
Percentage	62.2%	37.8%
- County results Bishop: 60–70%
U.S. Representative before election
Tim Bishop
Democratic
Elected U.S. Representative
Tim Bishop
Democratic

=== Predictions ===
Source	Ranking	As of
The Cook Political Report	Safe D	November 6, 2006
Rothenberg	Safe D	November 6, 2006
Sabato's Crystal Ball	Safe D	November 6, 2006
Real Clear Politics	Safe D	November 7, 2006
CQ Politics	Safe D	November 7, 2006

== District 2 ==
2006 New York's 2nd congressional district election
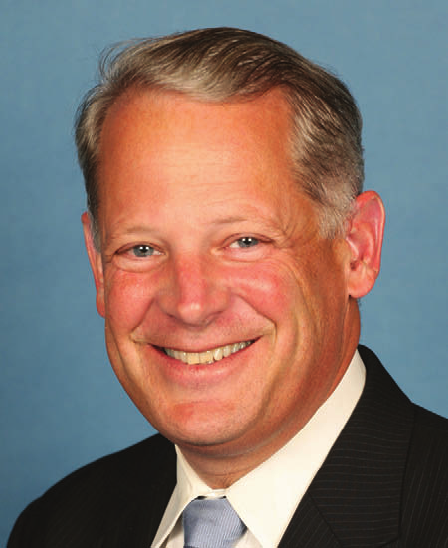

Nominee	Steve Israel	John W. Bugler
Party	Democratic	Republican
Popular vote	105,276	44,212
Percentage	70.4%	29.6%
- County results Israel: 60–70% 70–80%
U.S. Representative before election
Steve Israel
Democratic
Elected U.S. Representative
Steve Israel
Democratic

=== Predictions ===
Source	Ranking	As of
The Cook Political Report	Safe D	November 6, 2006
Rothenberg	Safe D	November 6, 2006
Sabato's Crystal Ball	Safe D	November 6, 2006
Real Clear Politics	Safe D	November 7, 2006
CQ Politics	Safe D	November 7, 2006

Results

New York's 2nd congressional district election, 2006
Party	Candidate	Votes	%
Democratic	Steve Israel	105,276	70.42%
Republican	John W. Bugler	44,212	29.58%
Total votes		149,488	100.00%

== District 3 ==
2006 New York's 3rd congressional district election
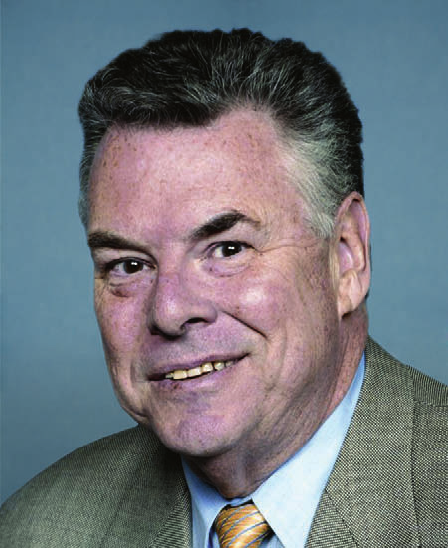

Nominee	Peter King	David Mejias
Party	Republican	Democratic
Percentage	56.0%	44.0%
- County results King: 50–60%
U.S. Representative before election
Peter King
Republican
Elected U.S. Representative
Peter King
Republican

Incumbent Peter King (R) was elected for his sixth term by a healthy margin in 2004, 63% to 37%, but King is the only Republican congressman left on Long Island, where Republicans once were the majority party. Although King has broken with his party on a few key issues, he is potentially vulnerable in a district that is increasingly moderate to liberal. Nassau County Legislator Dave Mejias announced his candidacy on May 25 and was King's strongest opponent in years. An October 26 Majority-Watch poll had King leading Mejias 51% to 44% . King was re-elected to another term in the House, garnering 56% of the vote.

=== Predictions ===
Source	Ranking	As of
The Cook Political Report	Likely R	November 6, 2006
Rothenberg	Likely R	November 6, 2006
Sabato's Crystal Ball	Likely R	November 6, 2006
Real Clear Politics	Safe R	November 7, 2006
CQ Politics	Likely R	November 7, 2006

== District 4 ==
2006 New York's 4th congressional district election
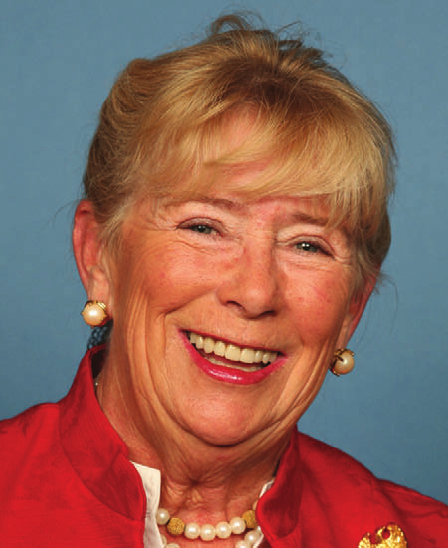

Nominee	Carolyn McCarthy	Martin Blessinger
Party	Democratic	Republican
Percentage	64.9%	35.1%
- County results Mccarthy: 60–70%
U.S. Representative before election
Carolyn McCarthy
Democratic
Elected U.S. Representative
Carolyn McCarthy
Democratic

=== Predictions ===
Source	Ranking	As of
The Cook Political Report	Safe D	November 6, 2006
Rothenberg	Safe D	November 6, 2006
Sabato's Crystal Ball	Safe D	November 6, 2006
Real Clear Politics	Safe D	November 7, 2006
CQ Politics	Safe D	November 7, 2006

== District 5 ==
2006 New York's 5th congressional district election
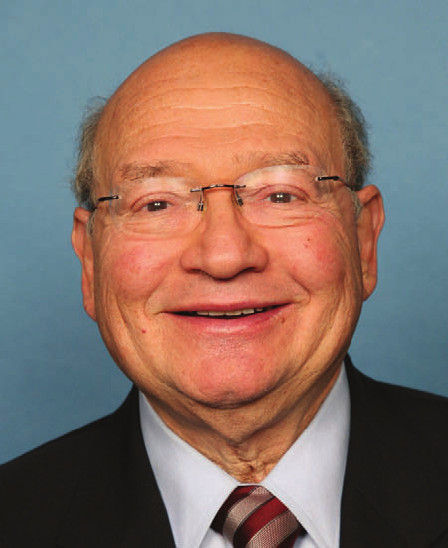
Nominee	Gary Ackerman
Party	Democratic
U.S. Representative before election
Gary Ackerman
Democratic
Elected U.S. Representative
Gary Ackerman
Democratic

=== Predictions ===
Source	Ranking	As of
The Cook Political Report	Safe D	November 6, 2006
Rothenberg	Safe D	November 6, 2006
Sabato's Crystal Ball	Safe D	November 6, 2006
Real Clear Politics	Safe D	November 7, 2006
CQ Politics	Safe D	November 7, 2006

== District 6 ==
2006 New York's 6th congressional district election
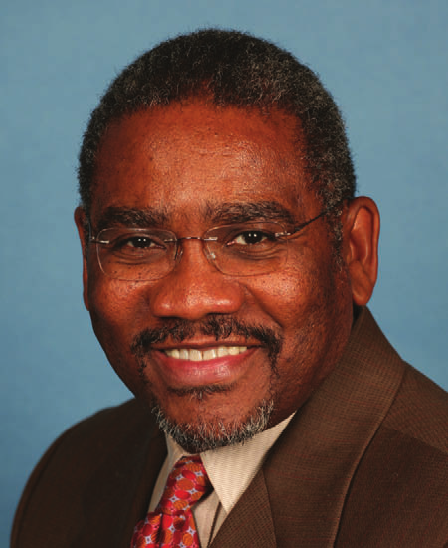
Nominee	Gregory Meeks
Party	Democratic
U.S. Representative before election
Gregory Meeks
Democratic
Elected U.S. Representative
Gregory Meeks
Democratic

=== Predictions ===
Source	Ranking	As of
The Cook Political Report	Safe D	November 6, 2006
Rothenberg	Safe D	November 6, 2006
Sabato's Crystal Ball	Safe D	November 6, 2006
Real Clear Politics	Safe D	November 7, 2006
CQ Politics	Safe D	November 7, 2006

== District 7 ==
2006 New York's 7th congressional district election
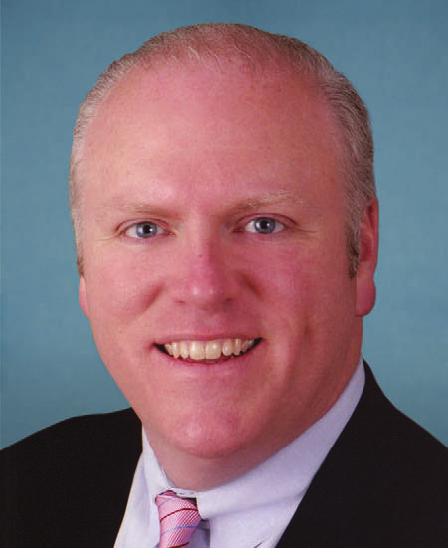

Nominee	Joseph Crowley	Kevin Brawley
Party	Democratic	Republican
Percentage	84.0%	16.0%
U.S. Representative before election
Joseph Crowley
Democratic
Elected U.S. Representative
Joseph Crowley
Democratic

=== Predictions ===
Source	Ranking	As of
The Cook Political Report	Safe D	November 6, 2006
Rothenberg	Safe D	November 6, 2006
Sabato's Crystal Ball	Safe D	November 6, 2006
Real Clear Politics	Safe D	November 7, 2006
CQ Politics	Safe D	November 7, 2006

== District 8 ==
2006 New York's 8th congressional district election
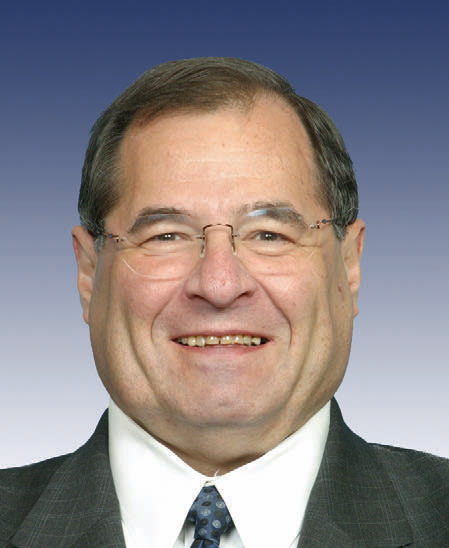

Nominee	Jerrold Nadler	Eleanor Friedman
Party	Democratic	Republican
Percentage	85.0%	13.6%
U.S. Representative before election
Jerrold Nadler
Democratic
Elected U.S. Representative
Jerrold Nadler
Democratic

=== Predictions ===
Source	Ranking	As of
The Cook Political Report	Safe D	November 6, 2006
Rothenberg	Safe D	November 6, 2006
Sabato's Crystal Ball	Safe D	November 6, 2006
Real Clear Politics	Safe D	November 7, 2006
CQ Politics	Safe D	November 7, 2006

== District 9 ==
2006 New York's 9th congressional district election
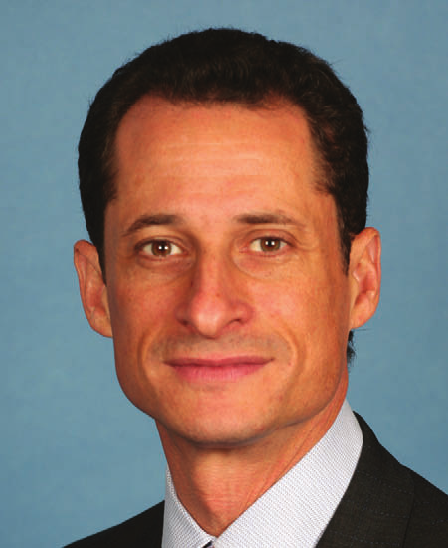
Nominee	Anthony Weiner
Party	Democratic
U.S. Representative before election
Anthony Weiner
Democratic
Elected U.S. Representative
Anthony Weiner
Democratic

=== Predictions ===
Source	Ranking	As of
The Cook Political Report	Safe D	November 6, 2006
Rothenberg	Safe D	November 6, 2006
Sabato's Crystal Ball	Safe D	November 6, 2006
Real Clear Politics	Safe D	November 7, 2006
CQ Politics	Safe D	November 7, 2006

== District 10 ==
2006 New York's 10th congressional district election
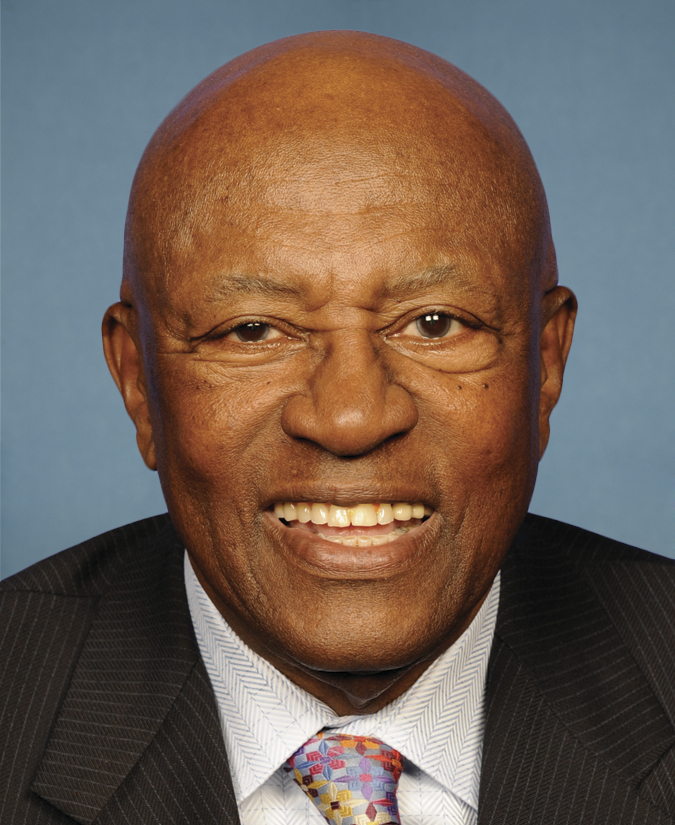

Nominee	Ed Towns	Jonathan Anderson
Party	Democratic	Republican
Percentage	92.2%	5.9%
U.S. Representative before election
Ed Towns
Democratic
Elected U.S. Representative
Ed Towns
Democratic

=== Predictions ===
Source	Ranking	As of
The Cook Political Report	Safe D	November 6, 2006
Rothenberg	Safe D	November 6, 2006
Sabato's Crystal Ball	Safe D	November 6, 2006
Real Clear Politics	Safe D	November 7, 2006
CQ Politics	Safe D	November 7, 2006

== District 11 ==
2006 New York's 11th congressional district election
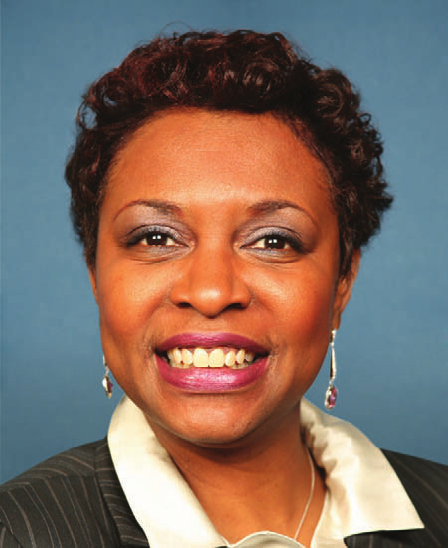

Nominee	Yvette Clarke	Stephen Finger
Party	Democratic	Republican
Percentage	90.0%	7.6%
U.S. Representative before election
Major Owens
Democratic
Elected U.S. Representative
Yvette Clarke
Democratic

Incumbent Major Owens (D) retired after 12 terms. In 2004 Owens was reelected with 94% of the vote in this majority African-American district in the center of Brooklyn. The Democratic primary was won by New York City Councilwoman Yvette Clarke. Little-known Republican physician Steve Finger was also running for the open seat. Yvette Clarke was a strong winner with 89% of the vote.

=== Predictions ===
Source	Ranking	As of
The Cook Political Report	Safe D	November 6, 2006
Rothenberg	Safe D	November 6, 2006
Sabato's Crystal Ball	Safe D	November 6, 2006
Real Clear Politics	Safe D	November 7, 2006
CQ Politics	Safe D	November 7, 2006

== District 12 ==
2006 New York's 12th congressional district election
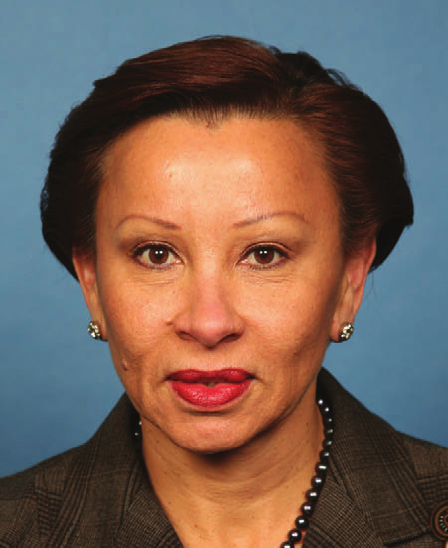

Nominee	Nydia Velázquez	Allan Romaguera
Party	Democratic	Republican
Percentage	89.7%	10.3%
U.S. Representative before election
Nydia Velázquez
Democratic
Elected U.S. Representative
Nydia Velázquez
Democratic

=== Predictions ===
Source	Ranking	As of
The Cook Political Report	Safe D	November 6, 2006
Rothenberg	Safe D	November 6, 2006
Sabato's Crystal Ball	Safe D	November 6, 2006
Real Clear Politics	Safe D	November 7, 2006
CQ Politics	Safe D	November 7, 2006

== District 13 ==
2006 New York's 13th congressional district election
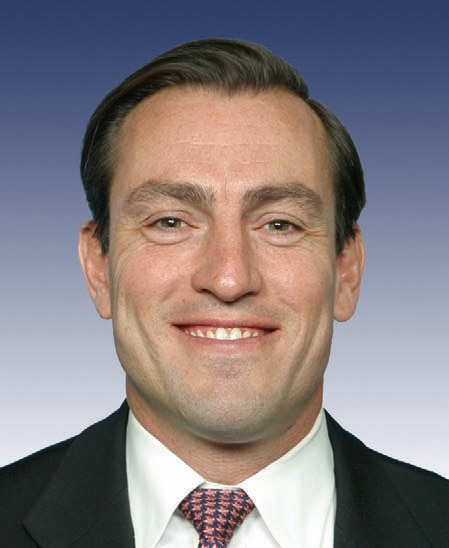

Nominee	Vito Fossella	Steve Harrison
Party	Republican	Democratic
Percentage	56.8%	43.2%
U.S. Representative before election
Vito Fossella
Republican
Elected U.S. Representative
Vito Fossella
Republican

The 2006 election for New York's 13th congressional district was won by the Republican incumbent Vito Fossella. Since easily winning a special election in 1997, Fossella had long been reelected without trouble in this district which is based in Staten Island and the southwest section of Brooklyn. At the time Fossella was the only Republican in New York City's Congressional delegation.

However, in 2004 Fossella's share of the vote dropped dramatically against septuagenarian former judge, assemblyman and mayoral candidate Frank J. Barbaro, who achieved 41 percent of the vote. Attorney and former Brooklyn Community Board 10 Chairman, Steve Harrison, the 2006 Democratic candidate, improved on Barbaro's results receiving 43 percent of the vote.

=== Predictions ===
Source	Ranking	As of
The Cook Political Report	Safe R	November 6, 2006
Rothenberg	Safe R	November 6, 2006
Sabato's Crystal Ball	Safe R	November 6, 2006
Real Clear Politics	Safe R	November 7, 2006
CQ Politics	Likely R	November 7, 2006

Results: Fossella won with 57% of the vote.

== District 14 ==
2006 New York's 14th congressional district election
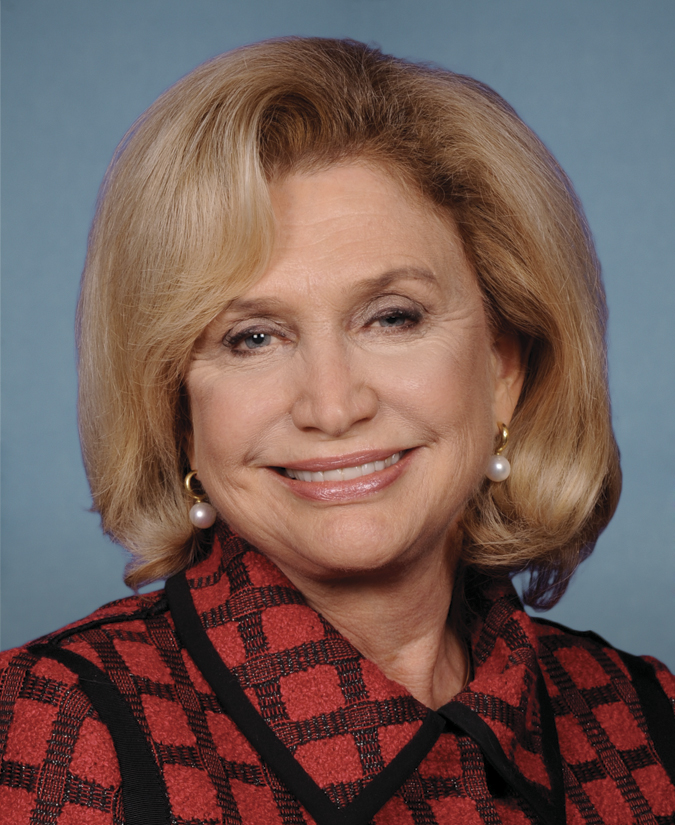

Nominee	Carolyn Maloney	Danniel Maio
Party	Democratic	Republican
Percentage	84.5%	15.5%
U.S. Representative before election
Carolyn Maloney
Democratic
Elected U.S. Representative
Carolyn Maloney
Democratic

=== Predictions ===
Source	Ranking	As of
The Cook Political Report	Safe D	November 6, 2006
Rothenberg	Safe D	November 6, 2006
Sabato's Crystal Ball	Safe D	November 6, 2006
Real Clear Politics	Safe D	November 7, 2006
CQ Politics	Safe D	November 7, 2006

== District 15 ==
2006 New York's 15th congressional district election
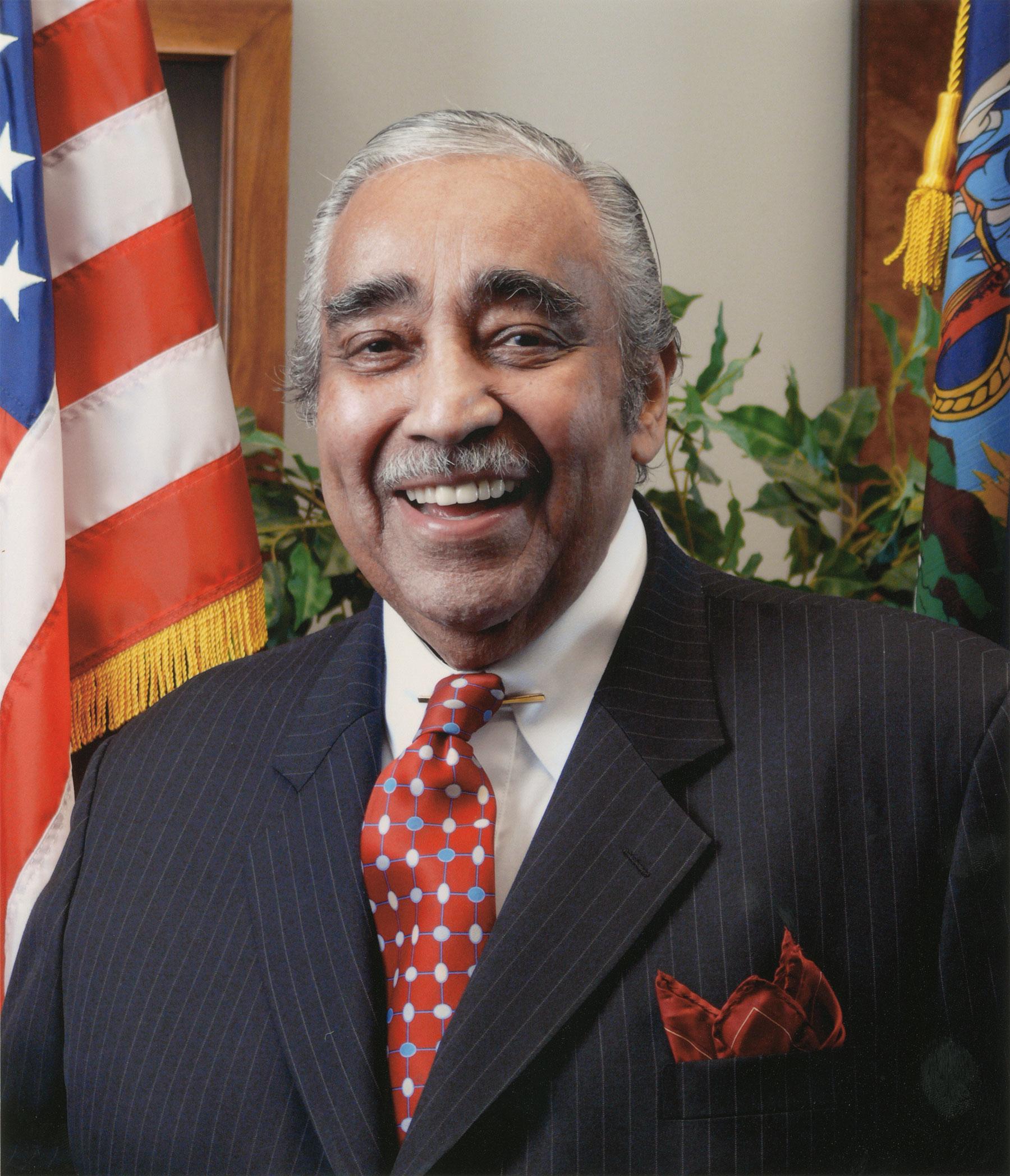

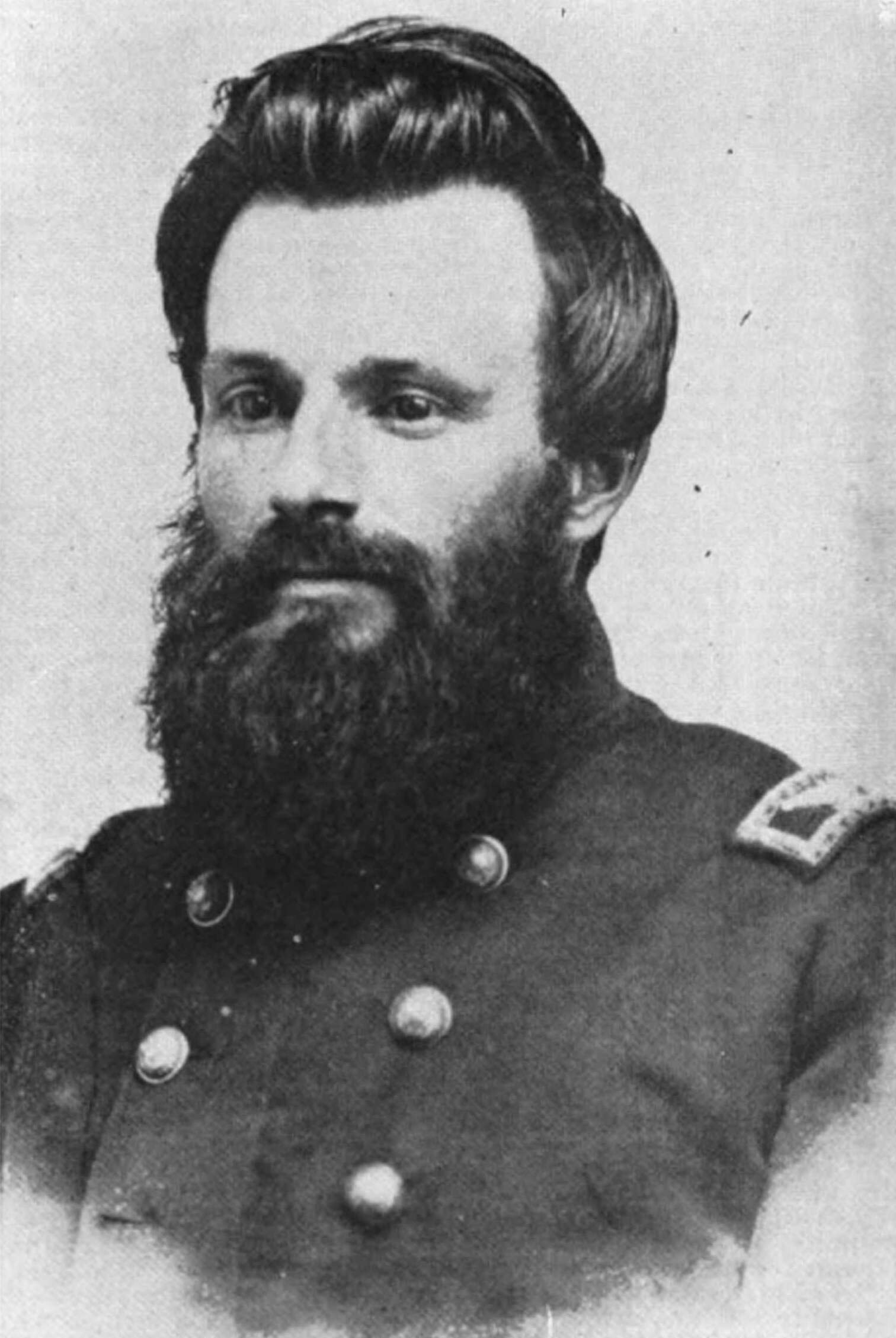
Nominee	Charles Rangel	Edward Daniels
Party	Democratic	Republican
Percentage	94.0%	6.0%
U.S. Representative before election
Charles Rangel
Democratic
Elected U.S. Representative
Charles Rangel
Democratic

=== Predictions ===
Source	Ranking	As of
The Cook Political Report	Safe D	November 6, 2006
Rothenberg	Safe D	November 6, 2006
Sabato's Crystal Ball	Safe D	November 6, 2006
Real Clear Politics	Safe D	November 7, 2006
CQ Politics	Safe D	November 7, 2006

== District 16 ==
2006 New York's 16th congressional district election
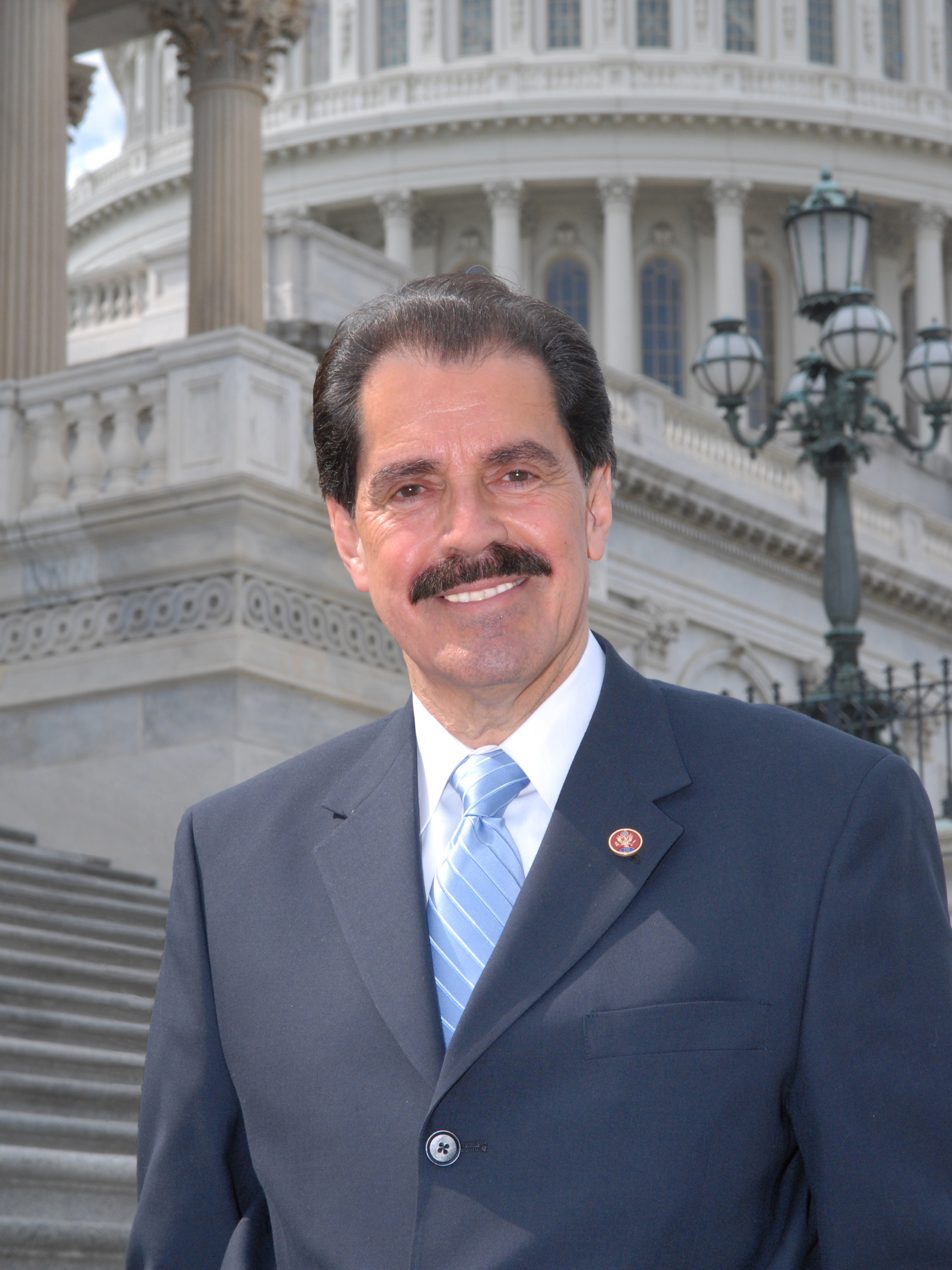

Nominee	Jose Serrano	Ali Mohamed
Party	Democratic	Republican
Percentage	95.3%	4.7%
U.S. Representative before election
Jose Serrano
Democratic
Elected U.S. Representative
Jose Serrano
Democratic

=== Predictions ===
Source	Ranking	As of
The Cook Political Report	Safe D	November 6, 2006
Rothenberg	Safe D	November 6, 2006
Sabato's Crystal Ball	Safe D	November 6, 2006
Real Clear Politics	Safe D	November 7, 2006
CQ Politics	Safe D	November 7, 2006

== District 17 ==
2006 New York's 17th congressional district election
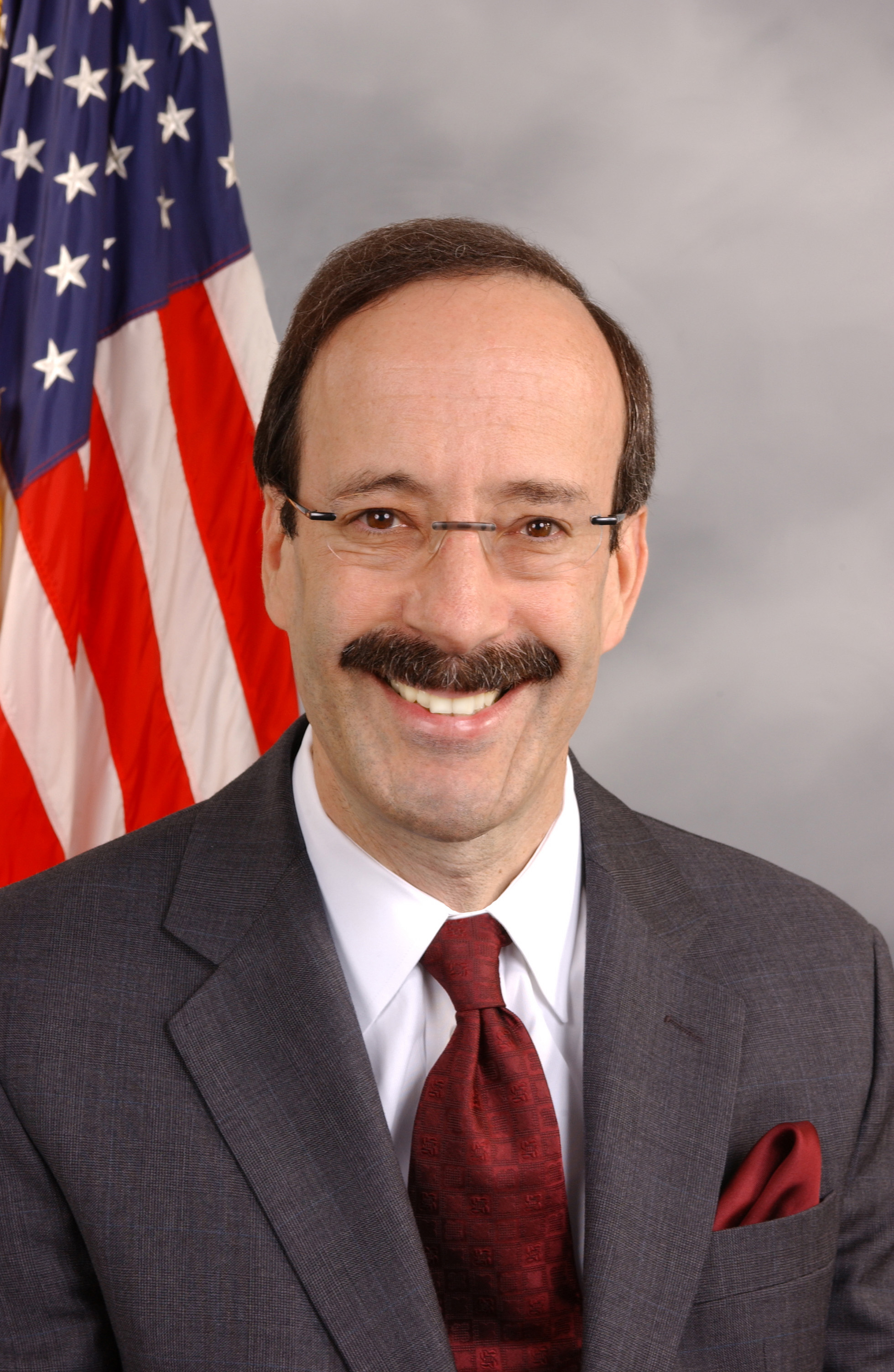

Nominee	Eliot Engel	Jim Faulkner
Party	Democratic	Republican
Percentage	76.4%	23.6%
U.S. Representative before election
Eliot Engel
Democratic
Elected U.S. Representative
Eliot Engel
Democratic

=== Predictions ===
Source	Ranking	As of
The Cook Political Report	Safe D	November 6, 2006
Rothenberg	Safe D	November 6, 2006
Sabato's Crystal Ball	Safe D	November 6, 2006
Real Clear Politics	Safe D	November 7, 2006
CQ Politics	Safe D	November 7, 2006

== District 18 ==
2006 New York's 18th congressional district election
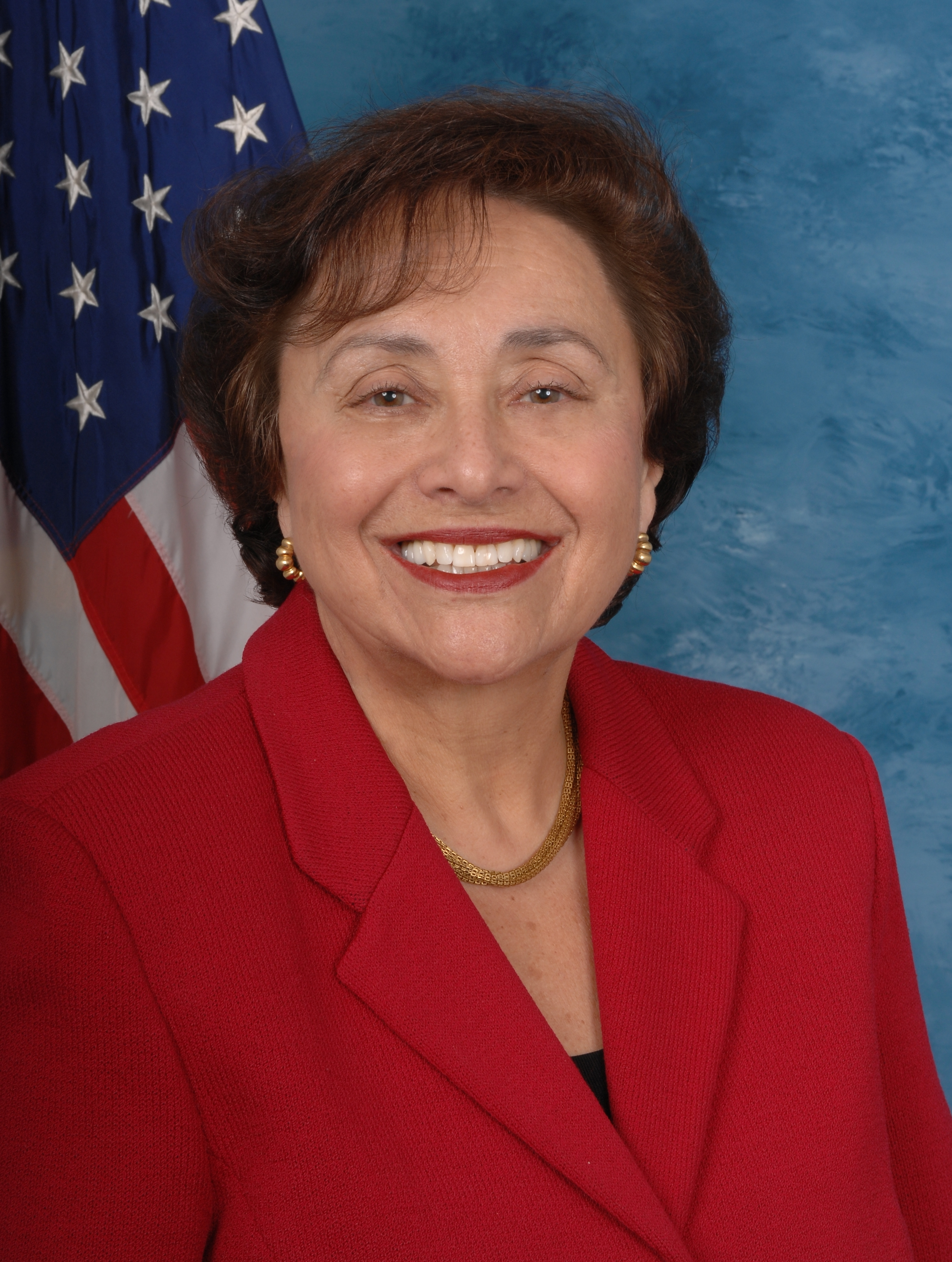

Nominee	Nita Lowey	Richard A. Hoffman
Party	Democratic	Republican
Percentage	70.7%	29.3%
U.S. Representative before election
Nita Lowey
Democratic
Elected U.S. Representative
Nita Lowey
Democratic

=== Predictions ===
Source	Ranking	As of
The Cook Political Report	Safe D	November 6, 2006
Rothenberg	Safe D	November 6, 2006
Sabato's Crystal Ball	Safe D	November 6, 2006
Real Clear Politics	Safe D	November 7, 2006
CQ Politics	Safe D	November 7, 2006

== District 19 ==
2006 New York's 19th congressional district election
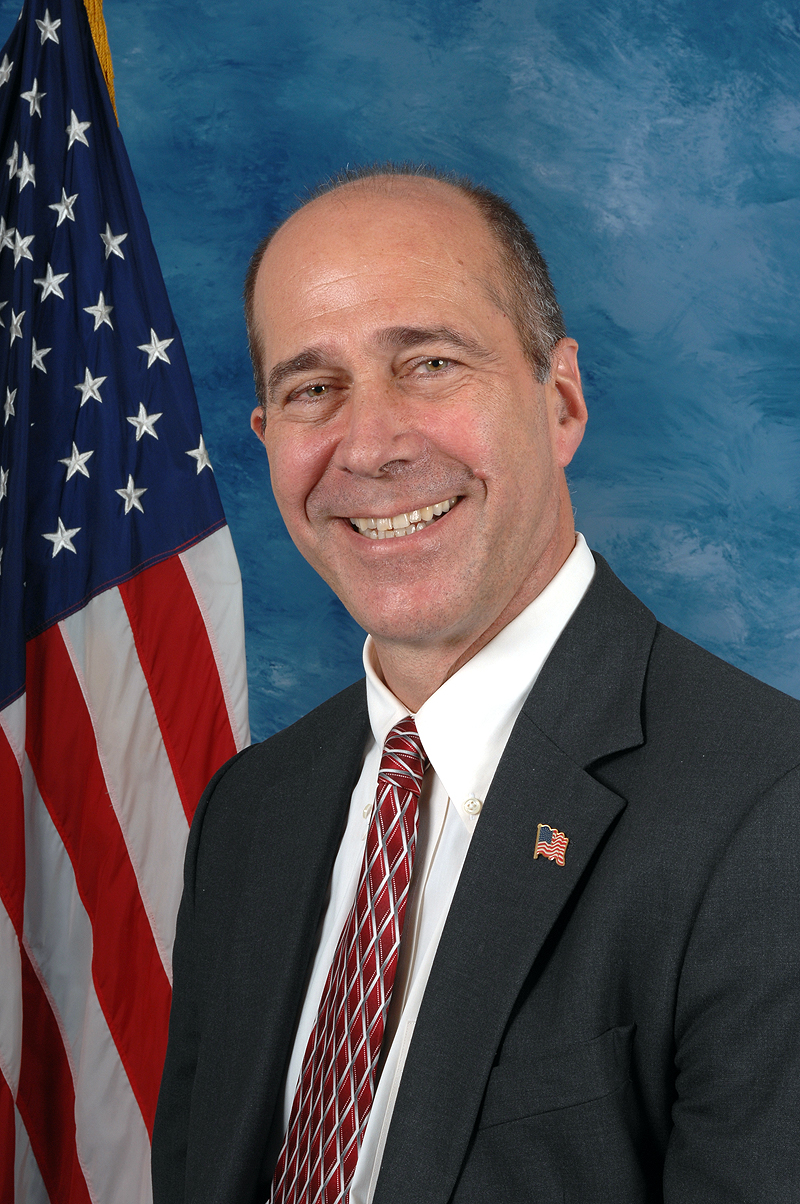

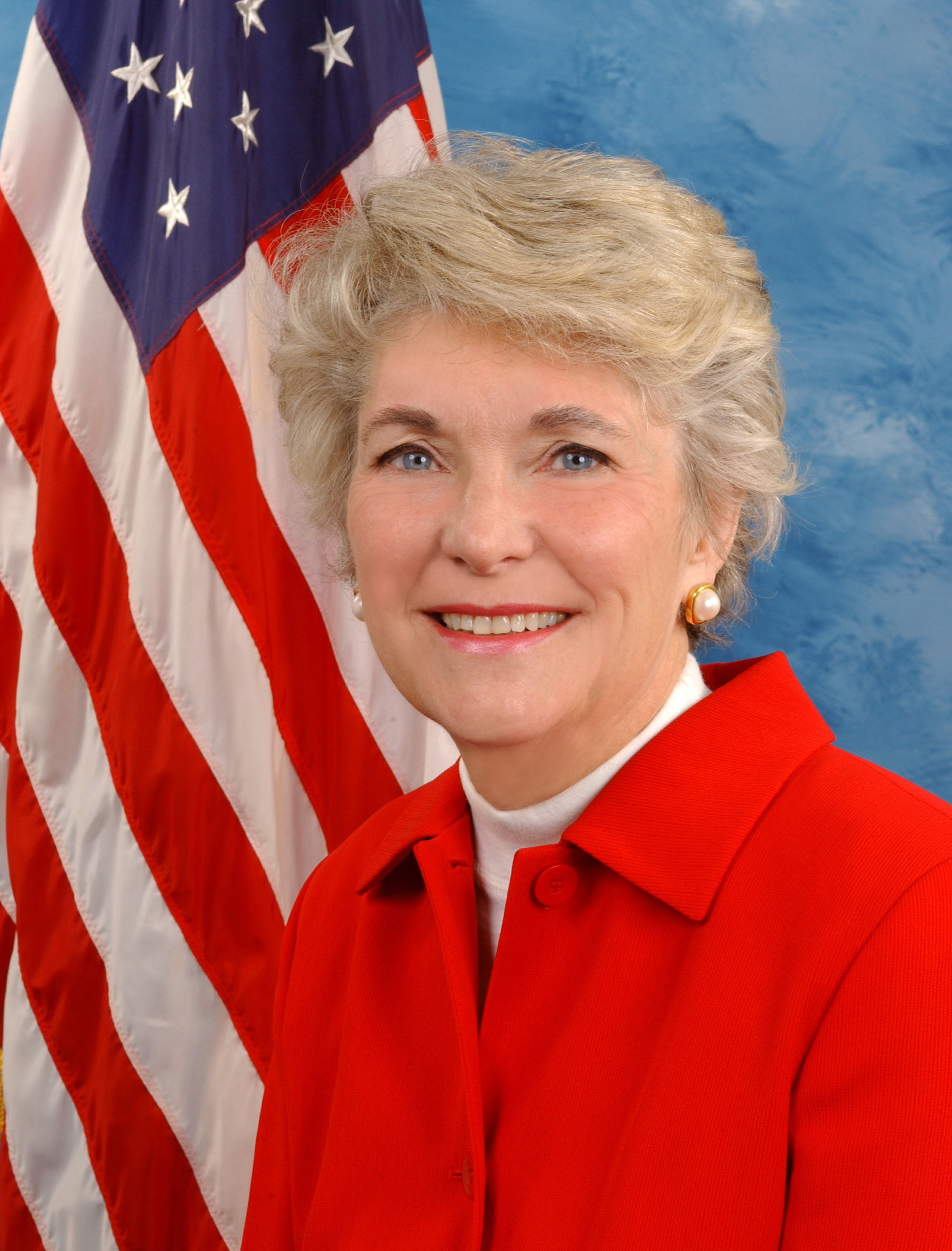
Nominee	John Hall	Sue Kelly
Party	Democratic	Republican
Percentage	51.2%	48.8%
U.S. Representative before election
Sue Kelly
Republican
Elected U.S. Representative
John Hall
Democratic

Incumbent Sue Kelly (R) had rarely faced stiff competition since her initial election in 1994, but the Democratic primary attracted six contenders in 2006, two of whom dropped out before the primary. Former Ulster County Legislator John Hall, who was once a member of the popular rock band, Orleans, won the Democratic nomination with 49% of the vote in a multi-candidate primary. An October 26 Majority-Watch poll had him leading 49% to 47% . Several factors played into Kelly's defeat, including the extremely weak GOP showing in the senatorial and gubernatorial races, her reluctance to answer questions about the Mark Foley Page Scandal, and Hall's quirky campaign style, which included an appearance on the satirical Comedy Central program The Colbert Report. Following Hall's election, Stephen Colbert took credit for the victory and attributed it entirely to Hall's appearance on the show. Hall appeared several days later to satirically thank the host for his seat in Congress.

=== Predictions ===
Source	Ranking	As of
The Cook Political Report	Lean R	November 6, 2006
Rothenberg	Likely R	November 6, 2006
Sabato's Crystal Ball	Tilt R	November 6, 2006
Real Clear Politics	Lean R	November 7, 2006
CQ Politics	Lean R	November 7, 2006

Results: Hall won with 51% of the vote.

== District 20 ==
2006 New York's 20th congressional district election
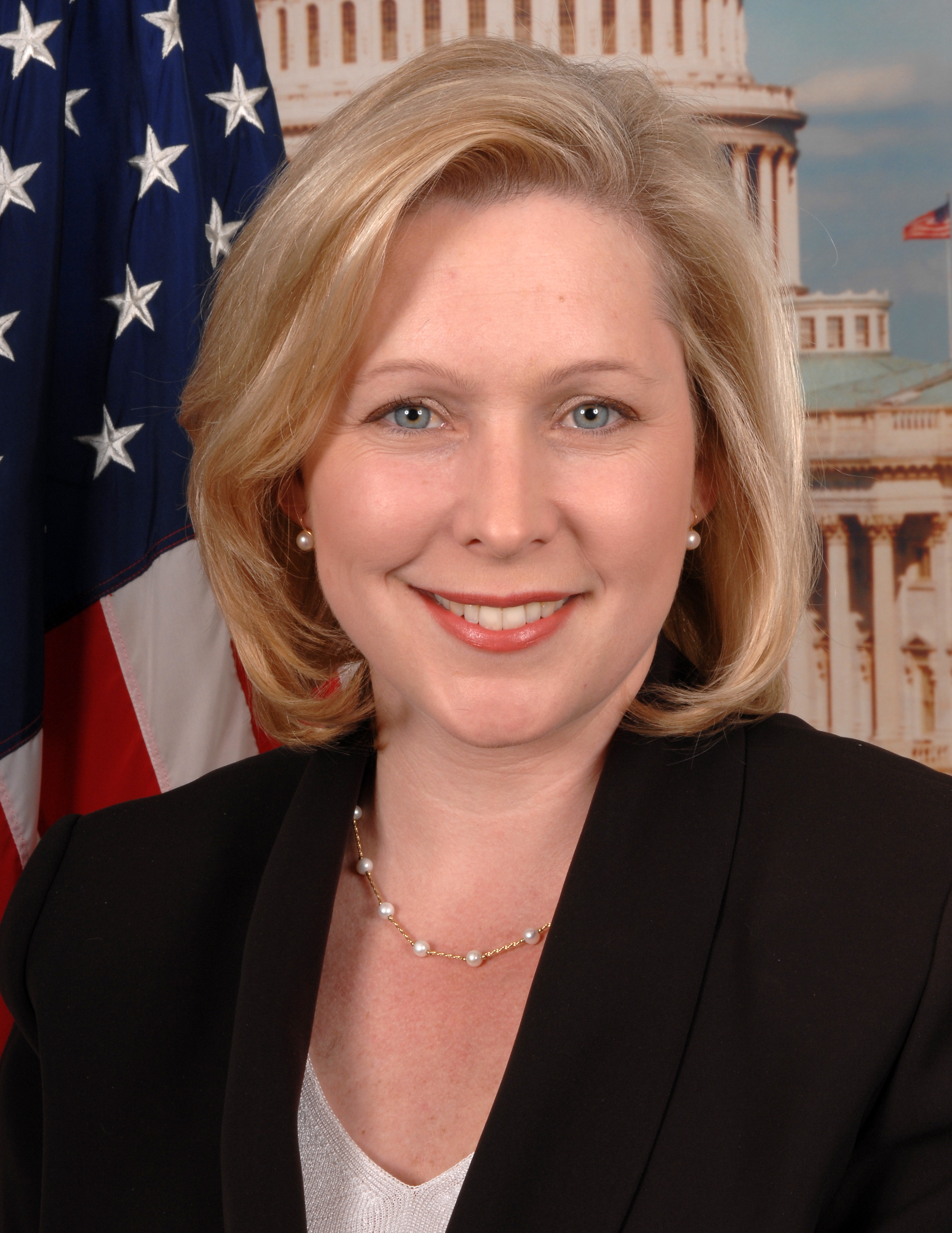

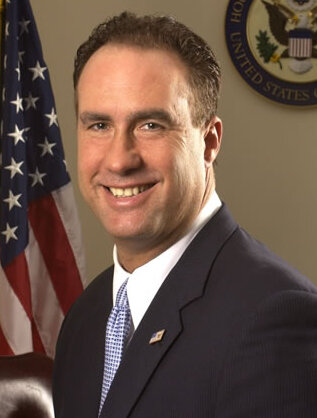
Nominee	Kirsten Gillibrand	John E. Sweeney
Party	Democratic	Republican
Popular vote	125,168	110,554
Percentage	53.1%	46.9%
- County results Gillibrand: 50–60% Sweeney: 50–60%
Representative before election
John E. Sweeney
Republican
Elected Representative
Kirsten Gillibrand
Democratic

Incumbent John E. Sweeney was the nominee for the Republican Party, while attorney Kirsten Gillibrand was the nominee for the Democratic Party. Gillibrand defeated Sweeney with 53% of the vote.

=== Republican ===
Incumbent John Sweeney' was running for re-election, although a newspaper reported in March 2006 that "Speculation has mounted over the past week regarding U.S. Rep. John Sweeney's future. Rumors are flying that the Clifton Park Republican might not seek re-election this fall. Between his health, his son's guilty plea to assault charges, a serious Democratic challenger, the DOJ pulling his financial filings and the Congressional Winter Challenge uproar, Sweeney is under a lot of stress and has been for a while".

No Republican filed to challenge Sweeney, although there was speculation earlier in 2006 that Alexander Treadwell of Lake Placid, Essex County, a Republican political leader and an ally of Governor George E. Pataki, would do so. State Senator Elizabeth Little of Queensbury, Warren County, had also been mentioned as a possible Republican contender should Sweeney not run. Over 40% of Sweeney's funding in this election cycle was from political action committees (PACs).

=== Democratic ===
The Democratic nominee was Kirsten Gillibrand, a native of Albany, who lives in Hudson. She had faced a primary challenge from three other Democratic candidates (computer engineer Edwin Pell, retired probation officer Douglas Walters, and activist Morris Guller), but all three dropped out of the race prior to the filing deadline.

Gillibrand supports middle-class tax cuts and has a proposal to let middle-class parents deduct up to $10,000 a year in college tuition. She supports changes to the GI Bill. Gillibrand proposed, as a short-term solution for high gasoline prices, eliminating the federal tax on gas, with lost revenue from the tax being recouped by ending subsidies for oil companies. She has issued an ethics proposal which includes an "Ethics IOU" to the voters. In the fundraising quarter ending June 30, 2006, her campaign raised more money than did Sweeney's.

=== Other parties ===
==== Libertarian Party ====
Eric Sundwall was the endorsed candidate of the Libertarian Party. He was a partner and co-founder of Old Kinderhook Integrated, a computer consulting company.

Sundwall received a degree in Political Science and History from the State University of New York at Albany. He studied in Copenhagen and worked with a for-profit law school, Concord. He currently serves on the New York and National Libertarian Party committees. As a third-party candidate, Sundwall hoped to raise awareness about ballot access rights. Sundwall called on Congress to "declare war" according to the U.S. Constitution when invading any nation. Sundwall's petitions were challenged on August 28 by three individuals with no obvious connection to the race. Sundwall was represented pro bono on these challenges by Warren Redlich, an attorney in Albany and the Republican candidate for Congress in New York's 21st congressional district. The Board of Elections determination held that Sundwall was 690 signatures short of the 3500 required by New York State election law. Sundwall's campaign challenged the New York Board of Elections in Federal District Court on October 10, 2006. Sundwall et al. v. Kelleher et al., sought a Temporary Restraining Order on the distribution of the NYS ballot claiming the 'town' requirement in the Independent designating petition as unconstitutional. Sundwall's complaint was denied by Judge Thomas Kahn.

==== Liberal Party ====
Morris N. Guller, a political activist and retired stockbroker from Greene County was endorsed by the New York State Liberal Party and attempted to challenge Gillibrand, Sweeney, and Sundwall on the Liberal line in the November general election. However, state records from August 27, 2006, show that Guller did not file petitions to run as the Liberal Party candidate. Guller earlier attempted to challenge Kirsten Gillibrand in the September Democratic primary, but dropped out a day before the filing deadline. In 2004, Guller ran against Sweeney on the independent Centrist Party line.

==== Independence Party ====
On July 13, 2006, both Gillibrand and Sweeney filed petitions to be listed on the Independence Party line on the November ballot. The Sweeney campaign challenged the number of valid signatures on the Gillibrand petitions, and ultimately the state Board of Elections ruled she did not have enough valid signatures, and gave the Independence Party line to Sweeney.

=== Campaign ===
In mid-August, residents of the 20th congressional district reported receiving a telephone call that some described as a "push-poll. The call included extremely negative questions about Gillibrand. When pushed by respondents to identify who was doing the poll, the callers provided a phone number that led to Western Wats, a Utah-based research group that does data collection. A Western Wats worker told the Albany Times Union that the poll was commissioned by The Tarrance Group, a national Republican polling firm that does a lot of work for the National Republican Congressional Committee. Sweeney's campaign insisted it had nothing to do with the poll.

Sweeney had visits to his district for fundraising and support by First Lady Laura Bush, Senator John McCain, and former New York City Mayor Rudy Giuliani.

Gillibrand was supported by a visit by former President Bill Clinton in late October, and a visit by Senator Hillary Clinton. Gillibrand benefited from gaffes by the Sweeney campaign, including the report of a domestic violence incident between the Congressman and his wife, as well as the statewide landslide victories of Eliot Spitzer and Hillary Clinton in New York's Gubernatorial and Senate race. Both Spitzer and Clinton won all the counties in the 20th district. Gillibrand defeated Sweeney in all the major population centers in the district, including Saratoga Springs, Troy, Rensselaer and Dutchess County. Gillibrand lost only rural and sparsely populated Delaware and Greene Counties to Sweeney.

=== Polls ===
Source:	Date:	Sweeney (R)	Gillibrand (D)	Sundwall (LTRN)	Guller (LIB)	Other/Undecided
Zogby Poll	June 8, 2006	48%	24%	2%	-	26%
Siena Poll	August 29, 2006	53%	34%	-	-	13%
Global Strategy	September 6, 2006	47%	39%	-	-	14%

Critics have argued that the Siena College poll had significant flaws; if so, Sweeney would still have been ahead of Gillibrand, but not as far. An August Siena College poll showed rather similar results .

=== Endorsements ===
Kirsten Gillibrand (D)

Individuals

- Wesley Clark, General, 2004 democratic presidential candidate

==== Predictions ====
Source	Ranking	As of
The Cook Political Report	Tossup	November 6, 2006
Rothenberg	Tilt D (flip)	November 6, 2006
Sabato's Crystal Ball	Tilt D (flip)	November 6, 2006
Real Clear Politics	Lean D (flip)	November 7, 2006
CQ Politics	Tossup	November 7, 2006

=== Results ===
New York 20th congressional district election, 2006
Party	Candidate	Votes	%	±%
Democratic	Kirsten Gillibrand	116,416		
Working Families	Kirsten Gillibrand	8,752		
Total	Kirsten Gillibrand	125,168	53.10	
Republican	John Sweeney	94,093		
Conservative	John Sweeney	9,869		
Independence	John Sweeney	6,592		
Total	John Sweeney (Incumbent)	110,554	46.90	
Majority		14,614		
Turnout		235,722		
Democratic gain from Republican		Swing		

== District 21 ==
2006 New York's 21st congressional district election
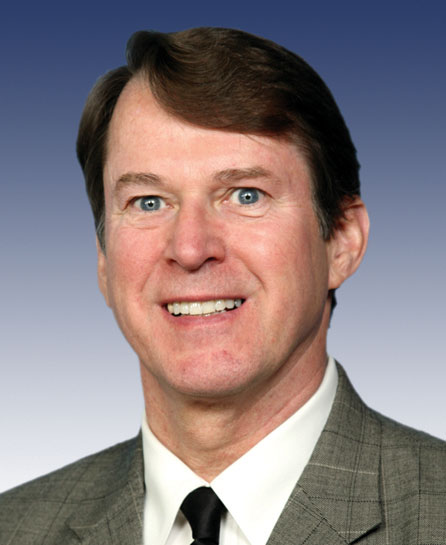

Nominee	Mike McNulty	Warren Redlich
Party	Democratic	Republican
Percentage	78.2%	21.8%
- County results Mcnulty: 60–70% 70–80% 80–90%
U.S. Representative before election
Mike McNulty
Democratic
Elected U.S. Representative
Mike McNulty
Democratic

=== Predictions ===
Source	Ranking	As of
The Cook Political Report	Safe D	November 6, 2006
Rothenberg	Safe D	November 6, 2006
Sabato's Crystal Ball	Safe D	November 6, 2006
Real Clear Politics	Safe D	November 7, 2006
CQ Politics	Safe D	November 7, 2006

== District 22 ==
2006 New York's 22nd congressional district election
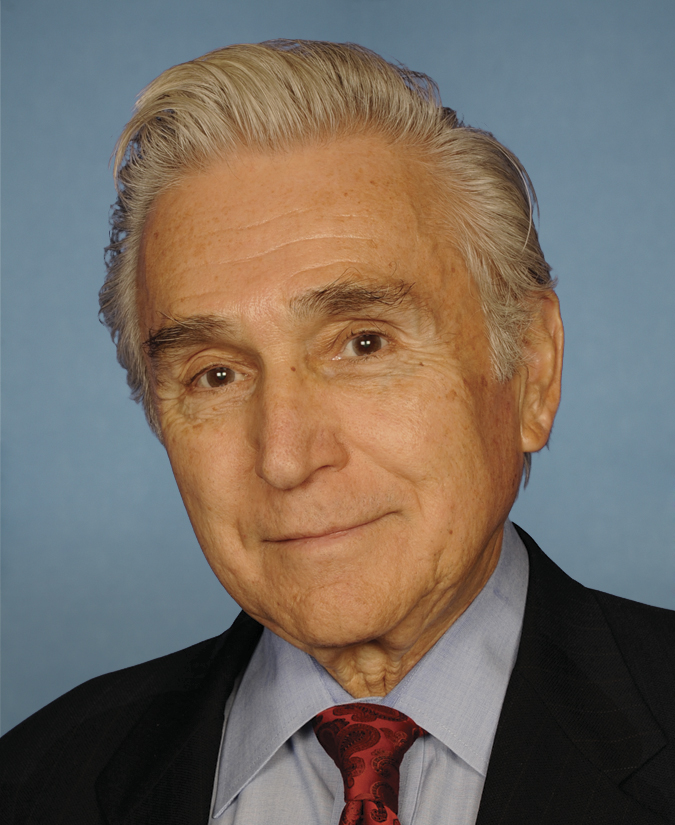
Nominee	Maurice Hinchey
Party	Democratic
U.S. Representative before election
Maurice Hinchey
Democratic
Elected U.S. Representative
Maurice Hinchey
Democratic

=== Predictions ===
Source	Ranking	As of
The Cook Political Report	Safe D	November 6, 2006
Rothenberg	Safe D	November 6, 2006
Sabato's Crystal Ball	Safe D	November 6, 2006
Real Clear Politics	Safe D	November 7, 2006
CQ Politics	Safe D	November 7, 2006

== District 23 ==
2006 New York's 23rd congressional district election
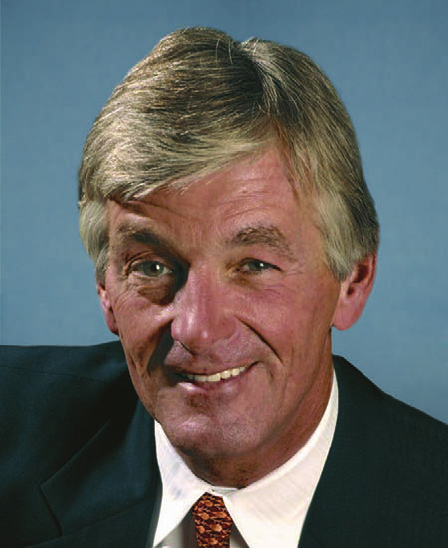

Nominee	John McHugh	Robert Johnson
Party	Republican	Democratic
Percentage	63.1%	36.9%
- County results Mchugh: 50–60% 60–70% 70–80%
U.S. Representative before election
John McHugh
Republican
Elected U.S. Representative
John McHugh
Republican

=== Predictions ===
Source	Ranking	As of
The Cook Political Report	Safe R	November 6, 2006
Rothenberg	Safe R	November 6, 2006
Sabato's Crystal Ball	Safe R	November 6, 2006
Real Clear Politics	Safe R	November 7, 2006
CQ Politics	Safe R	November 7, 2006

== District 24 ==
2006 New York's 24th congressional district election
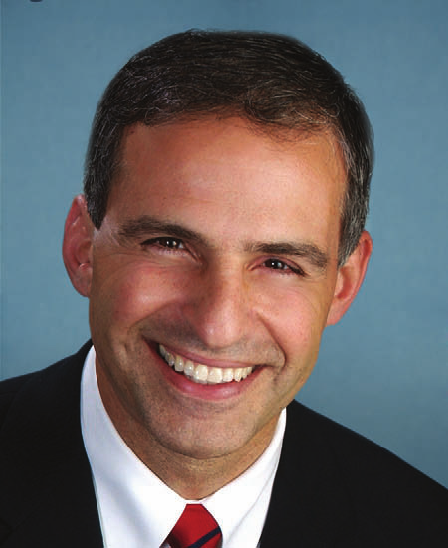

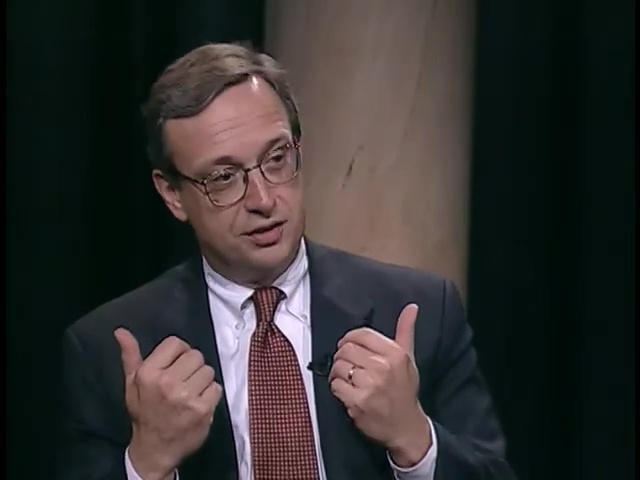
Nominee	Mike Arcuri	Ray Meier
Party	Democratic	Republican
Percentage	53.9%	45.0%
- County results Meier: 40–50% 50–60% Arcuri: 50–60% 60–70%
U.S. Representative before election
Sherwood Boehlert
Republican
Elected U.S. Representative
Mike Arcuri
Democratic

Incumbent Sherwood Boehlert (R) announced his retirement after twenty-four years, making this a seat of considerable focus for the Democrats in the follow-up to the mid-terms. Boehlert is considered a moderate Republican, and the district is considered to be a swing district. George Bush won this district by 53% in the 2004 election, but by only 3,000 votes in the 2000 presidential election. The Republican nominee is moderate state Senator Ray Meier, while the Democratic nominee is Oneida County District Attorney Mike Arcuri. Both are locally popular and proven vote-getters and the race was a toss-up.

=== Predictions ===
Source	Ranking	As of
The Cook Political Report	Lean D (flip)	November 6, 2006
Rothenberg	Tilt D (flip)	November 6, 2006
Sabato's Crystal Ball	Lean D (flip)	November 6, 2006
Real Clear Politics	Lean D (flip)	November 7, 2006
CQ Politics	Tossup	November 7, 2006

Results: Swings to the Democrats, with Arcuri winning 54% of the vote.

== District 25 ==
2006 New York's 25th congressional district election
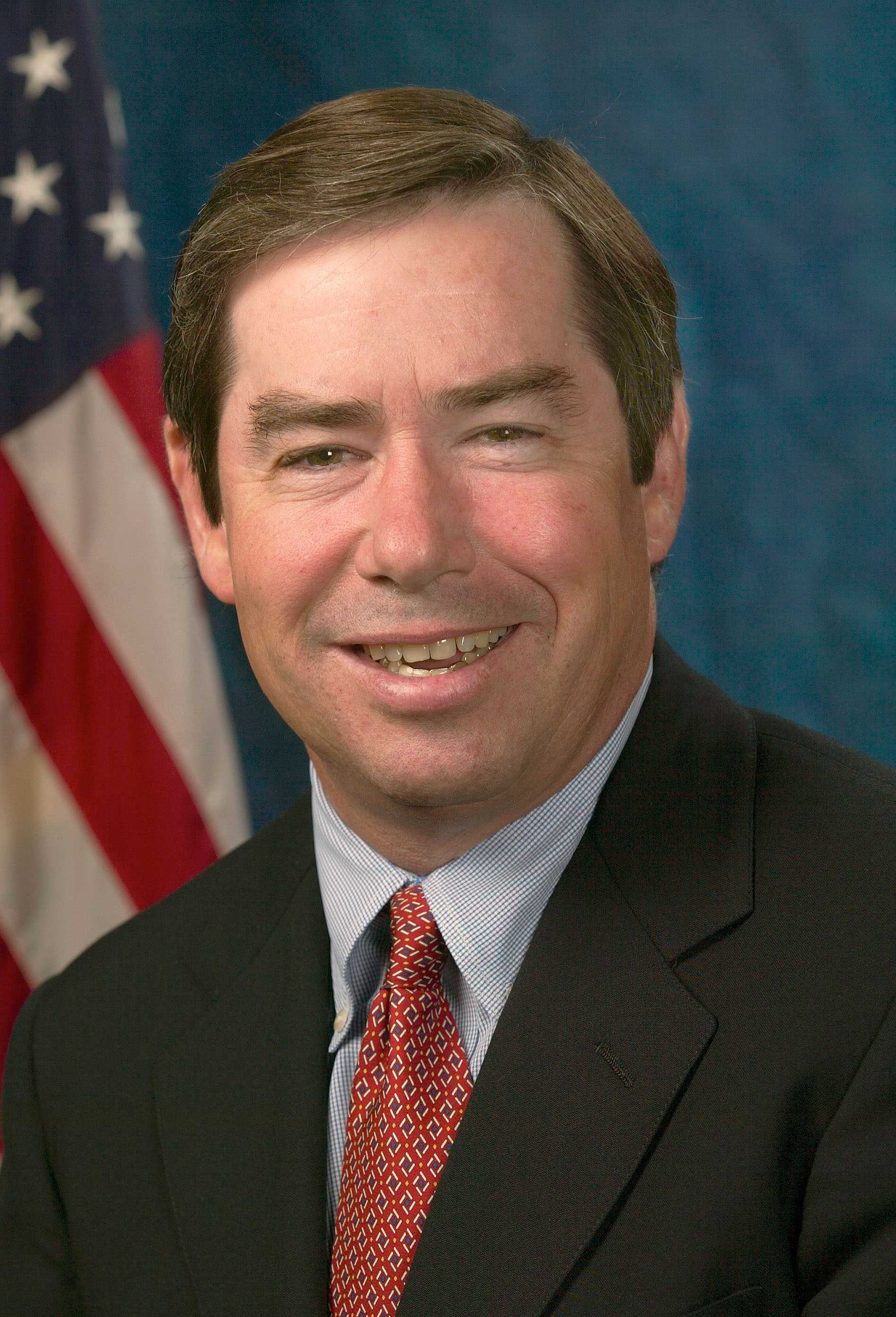

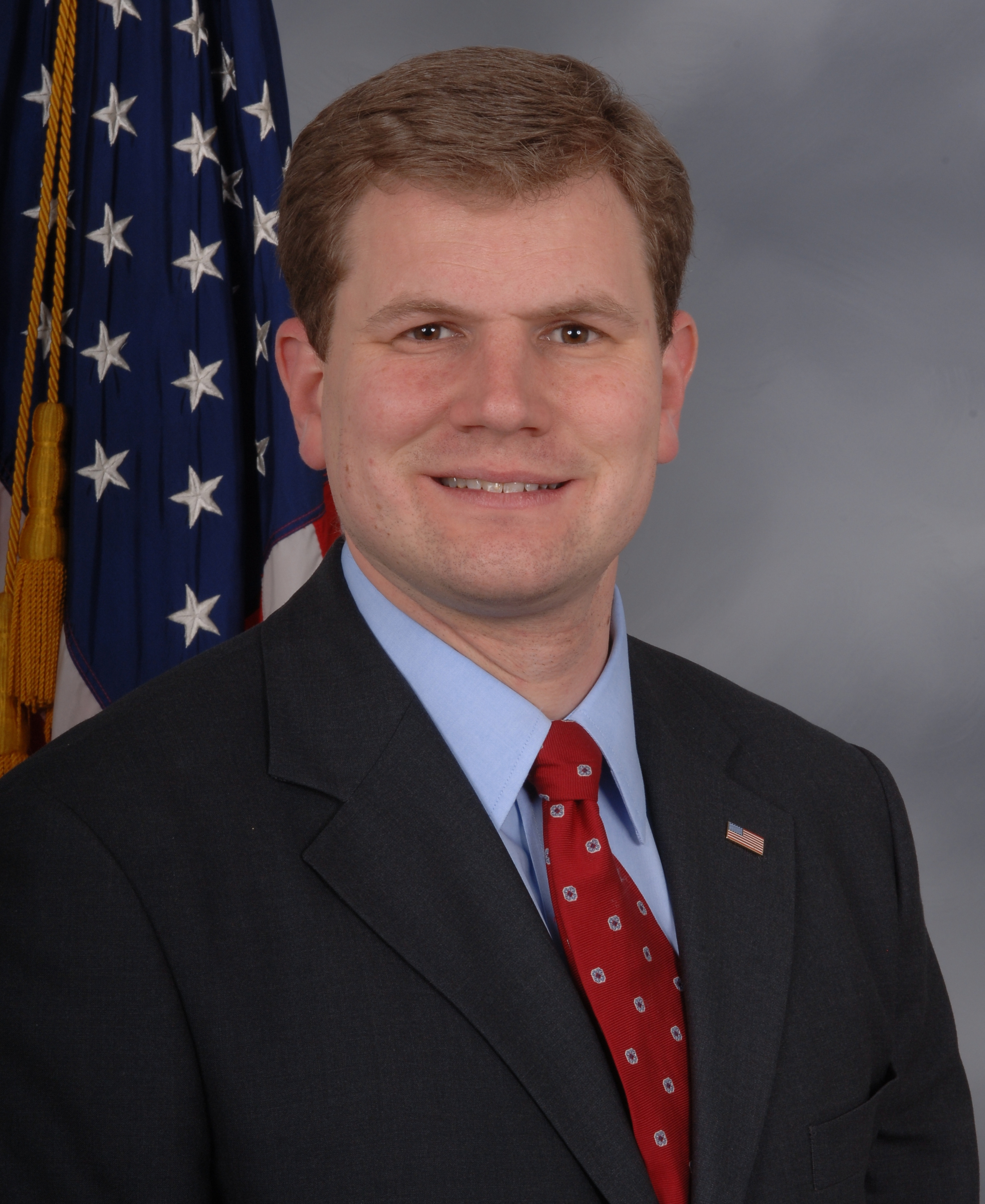
Nominee	Jim Walsh	Dan Maffei
Party	Republican	Democratic
Percentage	50.8%	49.2%
U.S. Representative before election
Jim Walsh
Republican
Elected U.S. Representative
Jim Walsh
Republican

Incumbent James T. Walsh (R), ran unopposed in 2004 and while the Syracuse-based district hasn't had a Democrat represent it since 1971, John Kerry won the district in 2004 by 2.5%. Thus, Walsh had the unusual distinction of being the only Republican to win unopposed and not have George W. Bush win his district. Democrats were fielding former congressional aide Dan Maffei. An October 15–16 Majority Watch poll had Maffei leading Walsh 51% to 43%..

=== Predictions ===
Source	Ranking	As of
The Cook Political Report	Lean R	November 6, 2006
Rothenberg	Tilt R	November 6, 2006
Sabato's Crystal Ball	Tilt R	November 6, 2006
Real Clear Politics	Lean R	November 7, 2006
CQ Politics	Lean R	November 7, 2006

Results: Walsh kept the district, winning with 51% of the vote.

== District 26 ==
2006 New York's 26th congressional district election
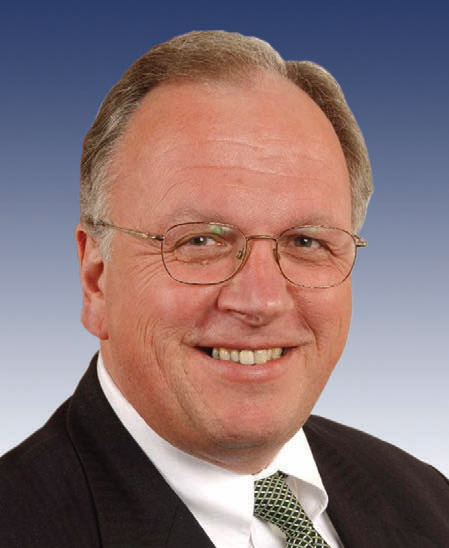

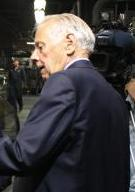
Nominee	Tom Reynolds	Jack Davis
Party	Republican	Democratic
Percentage	52.0%	48.0%
U.S. Representative before election
Tom Reynolds
Republican
Elected U.S. Representative
Tom Reynolds
Republican

Incumbent Thomas M. Reynolds (R), the National Republican Congressional Committee Chairman, faced a rematch with local industrialist and Marine Veteran Jack Davis. While the district leans substantially Republican, Reynolds was held to 55% of the vote in 2004 by political neophyte Davis, who had used the intervening time to build a political base. He campaigned against Reynolds' support of free trade, which he claimed had cost the district thousands of well-paying jobs. Reynolds is one of the Republican party's premiere fund-raisers, but Davis is independently wealthy, and vowed to spend up to $2 million on his campaign. Reynolds held a small lead in the polls until the Mark Foley scandal broke at the end of September. Reynolds had some knowledge of Foley's e-mails, and his chief of staff, Kirk Fordham, formerly Foley's chief of staff, was more directly involved. A November 3 SurveyUSA poll had Reynolds leading Davis 50% to 46% with 4% undecided..

=== Predictions ===
Source	Ranking	As of
The Cook Political Report	Tossup	November 6, 2006
Rothenberg	Tossup	November 6, 2006
Sabato's Crystal Ball	Tilt R	November 6, 2006
Real Clear Politics	Lean R	November 7, 2006
CQ Politics	Lean D (flip)	November 7, 2006

Results: Reynolds won a close race with 51% of the vote.

== District 27 ==
2006 New York's 27th congressional district election
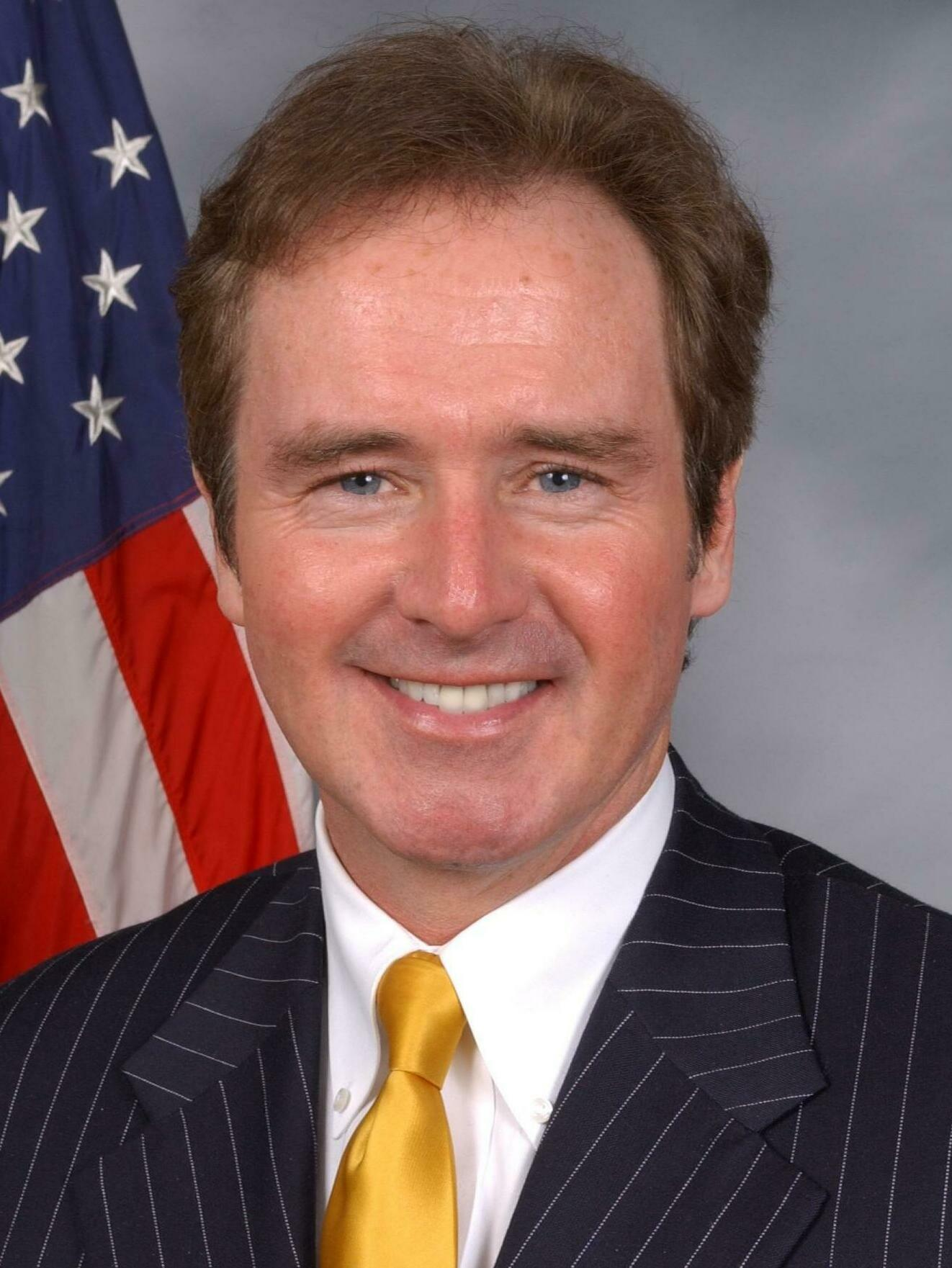

Nominee	Brian Higgins	Michael McHale
Party	Democratic	Republican
Percentage	79.3%	20.7%
U.S. Representative before election
Brian Higgins
Democratic
Elected U.S. Representative
Brian Higgins
Democratic

=== Predictions ===
Source	Ranking	As of
The Cook Political Report	Safe D	November 6, 2006
Rothenberg	Safe D	November 6, 2006
Sabato's Crystal Ball	Safe D	November 6, 2006
Real Clear Politics	Safe D	November 7, 2006
CQ Politics	Safe D	November 7, 2006

== District 28 ==
2006 New York's 28th congressional district election
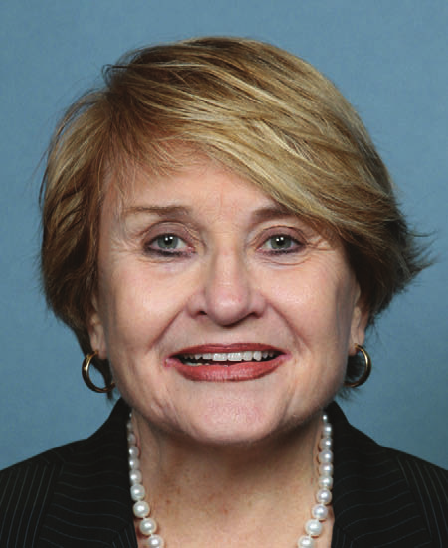

Nominee	Louise Slaughter	John Donnelly
Party	Democratic	Republican
Percentage	73.2%	26.8%
- County results Slaughter: 60–70% 70–80% Donnelly: 50–60%
U.S. Representative before election
Louise Slaughter
Democratic
Elected U.S. Representative
Louise Slaughter
Democratic

=== Predictions ===
Source	Ranking	As of
The Cook Political Report	Safe D	November 6, 2006
Rothenberg	Safe D	November 6, 2006
Sabato's Crystal Ball	Safe D	November 6, 2006
Real Clear Politics	Safe D	November 7, 2006
CQ Politics	Safe D	November 7, 2006

== District 29 ==
2006 New York's 29th congressional district election
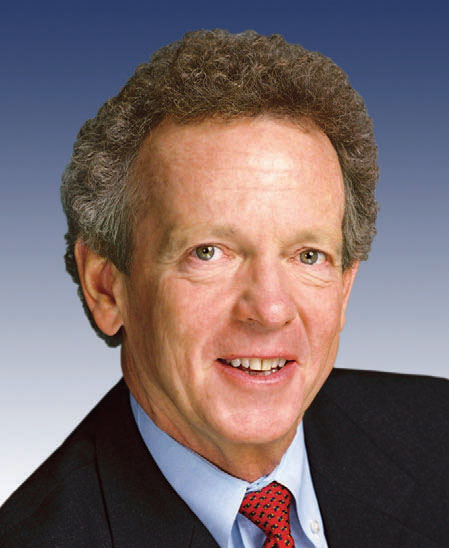

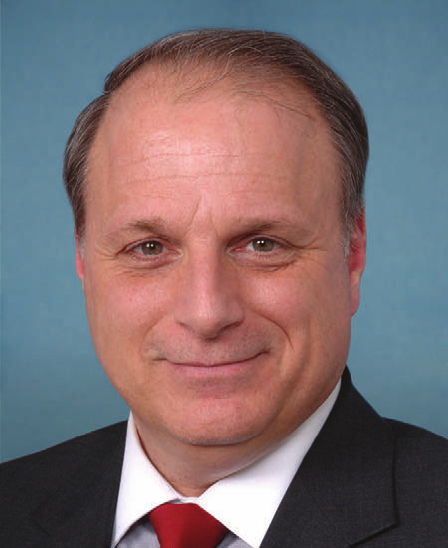
Nominee	Randy Kuhl	Eric Massa
Party	Republican	Democratic
Percentage	51.5%	48.5%
- County results Kuhl: 50–60% 60–70% Massa: 50–60%
U.S. Representative before election
Randy Kuhl
Republican
Elected U.S. Representative
Randy Kuhl
Republican

Freshman incumbent Randy Kuhl (R) was elected with 50% in a three-way race in 2004. He faced a potentially strong challenge from former U.S. Navy officer Eric Massa, a long-time friend of 2004 presidential candidate General Wesley Clark. Massa had been an extremely adept fundraiser. In March, President Bush visited the district, in part as a boost to Kuhl's re-election campaign. An October 26 Majority-Watch poll had Massa leading Kuhl 53% to 42%. . Cook Political Report rating: Lean Republican. CQPolitics rating: Leans Republican.

Freshman incumbent Randy Kuhl (R) had been elected to Congress with slightly over 50% of the popular vote in a three-way race in 2004. In early 2005, former U.S. Naval officer Eric J.J. Massa, a long-time friend of 2004 presidential candidate General Wesley Clark filed to run as the Democratic candidate. Over the next nine months, Massa overcame numerous challenges in his attempt to become the Democratic nominee, including candidate David Nachbar, who days after his announcement chose to step down due to an improper filing of his papers. By April 2006, Massa had secured the support of all Democratic county committees and become the presumptive Democratic candidate for the district.

In March 2006, President George W. Bush visited the district, as a chance to promote his new prescription drug plan, Medicare Part D. It was considered more of a public-relations boost for Kuhl's re-election campaign than instructive on the issues. In September 2006, Vice President Dick Cheney also made a fundraising appearance in support of Congressman Kuhl's re-election campaign. Massa, in turn, ran a Veterans Fundraiser outside the event in support of the local veterans and VA hospitals. Massa also had numerous endorsers including Congressman and DCCC Chairman Rahm Emanuel, President Bill Clinton, Senator Hillary Clinton, and frequent visits by former Senator Max Cleland.

=== Polls ===
Due to the difficulty and the presumptive win by Republicans, neither the Republicans nor Democrats poured money into polling in this district. From polling results in April 2006 by Massa's pollsters, Cooper and Secrest, the race was touted was a virtual dead-heat (Kuhl over Massa 43% to 41% +/- 4%). An October 2006 Majority-Watch poll had Massa leading Kuhl 53% to 42%.

Fundraising metrics showed Kuhl with a significant fundraising advantage (over $500K in his campaign account) over Massa. Over the course of the campaign, Massa consistently outraised Kuhl, sometimes to the tune of a very slim margin. As the Foley scandal took hold, Massa and the rest of the Democratic party saw an increase of funds - where Massa raised close to half of his funds in the last five weeks of the campaign - primarily from online donors - spurred on by his online outreach efforts.

=== Candidates ===
==== Randy Kuhl ====
A native of the 29th district, Congressman Randy Kuhl has lived in the area all of his life. The son of a doctor and a nurse/teacher, Randy was born in Bath, picked grapes and worked inside the wineries on the shores of Keuka Lake, attended school in Hammondsport, had summer jobs in construction and on several different farms during his college years. He owned and operated a business in Bath, became Steuben County attorney, then successfully ran for the New York State Assembly in 1980, the New York State Senate in 1986, and the U.S. House of Representatives in 2004 where he now serves and represents the people of the 29th district.

Randy Kuhl is a graduate of Hammondsport Central School, and earned a B.S. in Civil Engineering from Union College (1966), and in 1969 received his Juris Doctor from Syracuse University College of Law. He is a communicant of St. James Episcopal Church and has been active in the Hammondsport Rotary Club and BPOE 1547 in Bath. He is a member of the Advisory Committee of the Five Rivers Council of the Boy Scouts of America, the Branchport Rod and Gun Club, and the executive committee of the Steuben County Republican Committee. He is President of the Board of Directors of the Reginald Wood Scouting Memorial and an immediate past member of the Board of Directors of the Alliance for Manufacturing and Technology.

==== Eric Massa ====
Eric Massa was the Democratic nominee. He attended the U.S. Naval Academy at Annapolis and went on to serve in the Navy for 24 years. He eventually served as aide to former NATO Supreme Allied Commander, General Wesley Clark. Near the end of his Navy career, he was diagnosed with Non-Hodgkin lymphoma, a disease he was able to survive. A former Republican, he claims he left his party over the issue of the Iraq War and campaigned in New Hampshire during the campaign of his former boss, Wesley Clark's, failed presidential bid.

During the campaign, Massa positioned himself as strongly opposed to the Iraq war and unrestricted "free trade," favoring instead "fair trade". Other issues in his platform included expanding farm aid programs, as well as bringing homeland security money to the 29th district. Massa is also active in Band of Brothers/Veterans for a Secure America whose goal is to help veterans who are running for Congress as Democrats. Massa continued to blog on progressive sites and planned on launching his own blog, 29th United, but never achieved this goal.

==== Predictions ====
Source	Ranking	As of
The Cook Political Report	Lean R	November 6, 2006
Rothenberg	Tilt R	November 6, 2006
Sabato's Crystal Ball	Lean R	November 6, 2006
Real Clear Politics	Lean R	November 7, 2006
CQ Politics	Lean R	November 7, 2006

=== Results ===
On Election night, Congressman Kuhl had garnered 52% of the vote, Massa 48% of the vote. On Election night, Massa chose to request a recount and an accounting of absentee ballots because 6000 votes separated the two, and 10K were left to be counted. After a week of waiting, the ballots were approximately even and Congressman Kuhl was re-elected. Massa conceded the election with a telephone call to Congressman Kuhl.
