= List of mayors of Corning, New York =

The following is a list of mayors of the city of Corning, New York, United States.

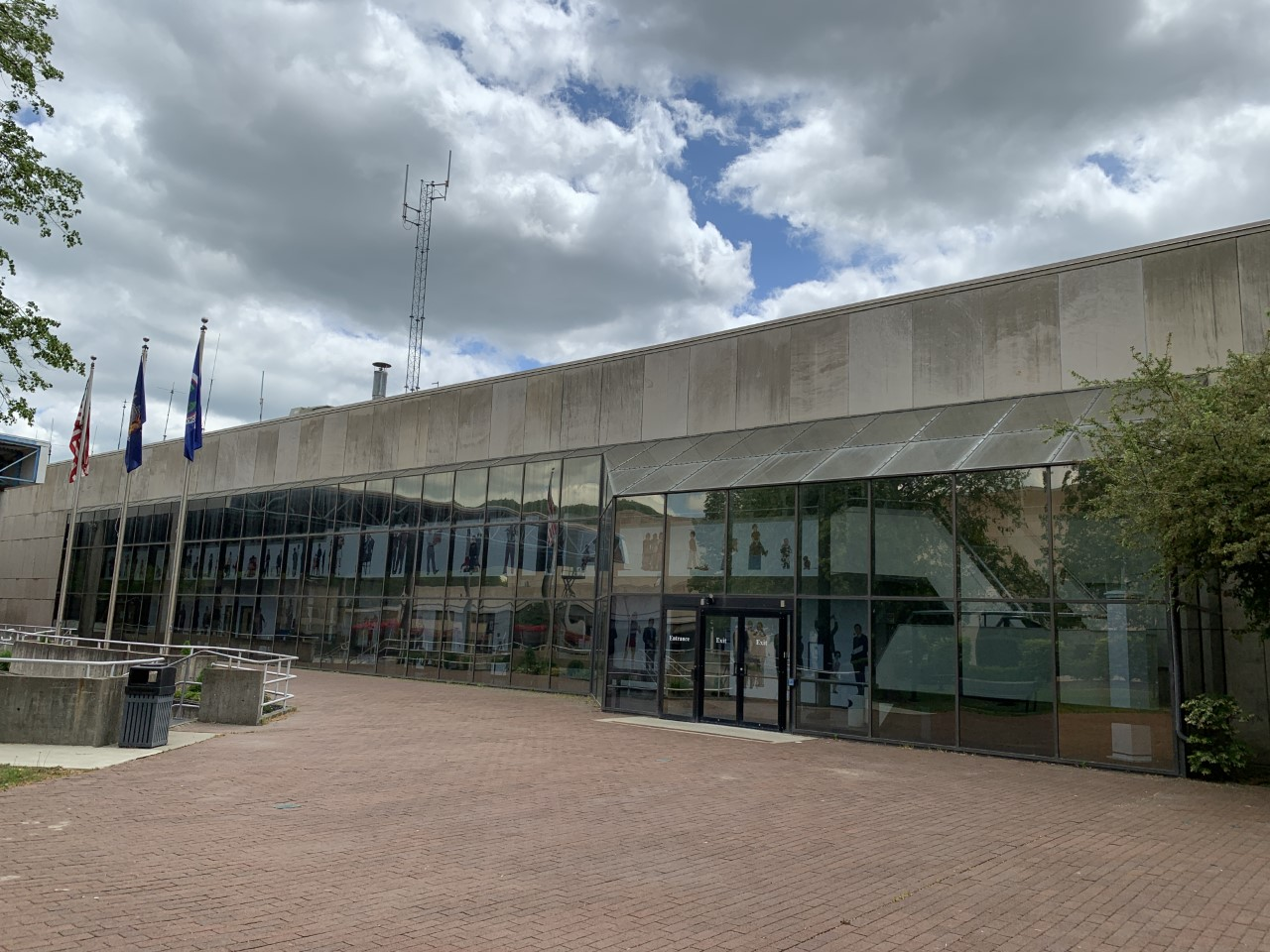
City hall building in Corning, New York; built in 1974 (photo 2021)

- William E. Gorton, 1890-1891
- Benjamin W. Wellington, 1892-1893
- William W. Adams, 1894-1895
- George W. Lane, 1896-1897, 1900-1901, c.1916, c.1920-1921
- William L. McGeorge, 1898-1899
- John L. Miller, 1902-1903, c.1930-1933
- Valentine Rettig, 1904-1907
- Thomas A. McNamara, 1908-1909
- Frederick A. Ellison, 1910-1913
- Lewis N. Lattin, 1914-1915
- Samuel E. Quackenbush, c.1922
- James P. Hallahan, c.1925
- Harry A. Rood, c.1926-1927
- William H. Tew, c.1928-1929
- Alfred G. Hood, c.1933-1935
- Daniel Stimson, c.1936-1947, 1956-1957
- Howard F. V. Cole, c.1948-1949
- George E. Keenan, c.1952-1953, 1959
- Joseph L. Andrews, c.1954-1955
- Joseph J. Nasser, c.1960-1983
- John C. Kostolansky Sr., 1989-1991
- Frank P. Coccho, 2006-2007
- Tom Reed, 2008-2009
- Rich Negri, 2010-2017
- William M. "Bill" Boland Jr., 2018-2025
- Pam Walker, 2025-present

== See also ==
- Corning City Hall, 1893-1972
- History of Corning, New York
