= Randy Kuhl =

American politician (born 1943)

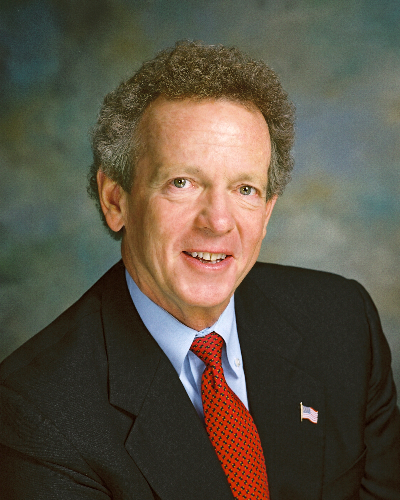

Member of the U.S. House of Representatives from New York's 29th district
- In office January 3, 2005 – January 3, 2009
- Preceded by: Amo Houghton
- Succeeded by: Eric Massa

Member of the New York Senate
- In office January 1, 1987 – December 31, 2004
- Preceded by: William T. Smith
- Succeeded by: George H. Winner Jr.
- Constituency: 52nd district (1987–2002); 53rd district (2003–2004)

Member of the New York State Assembly from the 127th district
- In office January 1, 1981 – December 31, 1986
- Preceded by: Charles Henderson
- Succeeded by: Donald Davidsen

Personal details
- Born: John Randolph Kuhl Jr. April 19, 1943 (age 83) Bath, New York, U.S.
- Party: Republican
- Relatives: James Kuhl (son)
- Education: Union College (BS); Syracuse University (JD)

John Randolph Kuhl Jr. (born April 19, 1943) is an American Republican politician. He is a former member of the New York State Assembly, the New York State Senate, and the United States House of Representatives. Kuhl represented New York's 29th congressional district for two terms before being defeated for reelection by Eric Massa in 2008.

== Early life and education ==
Kuhl was born in Hammondsport, New York. He graduated from Union College in Schenectady, New York with a B.A. in civil engineering in 1966, and then got a J.D. degree from Syracuse University College of Law in 1969. He was admitted to the New York Bar in 1970. He is an Episcopalian.

== New York State Legislature ==
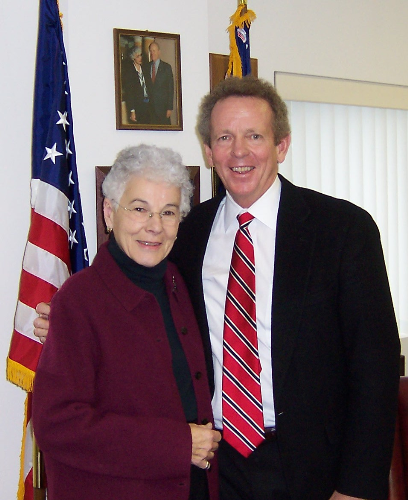
Kuhl and Patricia McGee were allies in the New York State Senate.

Kuhl was a member of the New York Assembly from 1981 to 1986, sitting in the 184th, 185th and 186th New York State Legislatures. In November 1986, after the retirement of William T. Smith, Kuhl ran for Smith's Senate seat and won.

Kuhl was a member of the New York State Senate from 1987 to 2004, sitting in the 187th, 188th, 189th, 190th, 192nd, 193rd, 194th, 195th and 196th New York State Legislatures. He was appointed the Senate's Assistant Majority Leader for Operations at the beginning of the 1995 legislative session.

One of Kuhl's signature issues in the state legislature was Upstate secession. He regularly introduced a bill "to let New York City, Long Island and Westchester and Rockland Counties became a separate state called New York; the rest of the counties would become West New York. At least one poll in upstate has found the idea to be wildly popular." Kuhl summed up his secessionist views by saying that "his constituents in the Finger Lakes region often wonder, 'Why don't you just cut the City of New York off and let it drift out to sea?'"

In 1997, while serving as a state senator, Kuhl was arrested and convicted of driving while intoxicated. His driver's license was revoked for six months.

== House of Representatives ==
=== 2004 election ===
In 2004, Kuhl ran for the House seat of retiring U.S. Representative Amo Houghton, a Republican multimillionaire who had displayed a moderate bent during 18 years in Washington. In the Republican primary, Kuhl, who was supported by Houghton, defeated Monroe County Legislator Mark Assini. He then defeated 27-year-old Democrat Samara Barend in the general election.

=== 2006 election ===
Kuhl's Democratic opponent in the 2006 elections was former Navy officer Eric Massa of Corning, a former Republican.

In March 2006, Kuhl invited President George W. Bush to Canandaigua. In September 2006, Kuhl welcomed Vice President Dick Cheney to a major fundraiser in Rochester. Kuhl agreed with Cheney's assessment that combating terrorists around the world was the top issue in the campaign. According to Kuhl, bad news from the war zone should be countered by a frank discussion of reality. Regarding his Finger Lakes and Southern Tier constituents, Kuhl said, "They don't necessarily understand the full importance of our presence there".

Preliminary results from the November election showed Kuhl narrowly beating Massa by a margin of approximately 5,600 votes (out of about 193,000 cast). Massa had initially refused to concede the election and was expected to file a challenge, but on November 15, 2006, Massa conceded the election and contacted Kuhl to congratulate him. According to the final election results, which were certified by the New York State Board of Elections on December 14, 2006, Kuhl won by a margin of 6,033 votes (out of 206,121 cast).

=== 2008 election ===
Kuhl's again faced Democratic nominee and former Navy officer Eric Massa, losing the rematch by a narrow 51%-49% margin, roughly reversing the outcome of the 2006 elections. Kuhl finished behind Massa in Cattaraugus County, a county Kuhl carried by a 56%-44% margin in 2006 (and one that voted for presidential candidate John McCain in 2008), likely contributing to the loss. Because the race was so close, Kuhl did not concede the election until November 21, 2008.

=== Political positions ===
Kuhl was considered a fairly reliable conservative who generally voted against abortion rights, gun control and tax increases. He was, however, a member of the Republican Main Street Partnership.

Kuhl supported making then-President Bush's tax cuts permanent. In addition, he also advocated for a 10-cent reduction in federal gasoline taxes.

In September 2007, Kuhl was noted in the news as being one of the most outspoken opponents of a plan by then-New York Governor Eliot Spitzer to allow illegal aliens to apply for driver's licenses. He also became a prominent opponent of the SCHIP expansion, a stance for which he earned significant animosity from various groups including MoveOn, the Service Employees International Union, and even former New York Governor Eliot Spitzer.

During his time as a state senator, Kuhl was an advocate of New York City secession and unsuccessfully introduced several bills to separate Upstate New York from downstate.

== Federal electoral results ==
US House election, 2004: New York District 29
Party	Candidate	Votes	%	±%
Republican	Randy Kuhl	136,883	50.7	−22.4
Democratic	Samara Barend	110,241	40.8	+19.5
Conservative	Mark W. Assini	17,272	6.4	+6.4
Independence	John Ciampoli	5,819	2.2	+2.2
Majority		26,642	9.9	−41.9
Turnout		270,215	100	+54.7

US House election, 2006: New York District 29
Party	Candidate	Votes	%	±%
Republican	Randy Kuhl (incumbent)	106,077	51.5	+0.8
Democratic	Eric Massa	100,044	48.5	+7.7
Majority		6,033	2.9	−7.0
Turnout		206,121	100	−23.7

US House election, 2008: New York District 29
Party	Candidate	Votes	%	±%
Democratic	Eric Massa	140,529	51.0	+2.5
Republican	Randy Kuhl (incumbent)	135,199	49.0	−2.5
Majority		5,330	1.9	−1.0
Turnout		275,728	100	+33.8

U.S. House of Representatives
Preceded by Amo Houghton	Member of the U.S. House of Representatives from New York's 29th congressional district 2005–2009	Succeeded by Eric Massa
U.S. order of precedence (ceremonial)
Preceded by Joe DioGuardi as Former U.S. Representative	Order of precedence of the United States as Former U.S. Representative	Succeeded by Mike Arcuri as Former U.S. Representative
