= Eric Massa =

American politician (born 1959)

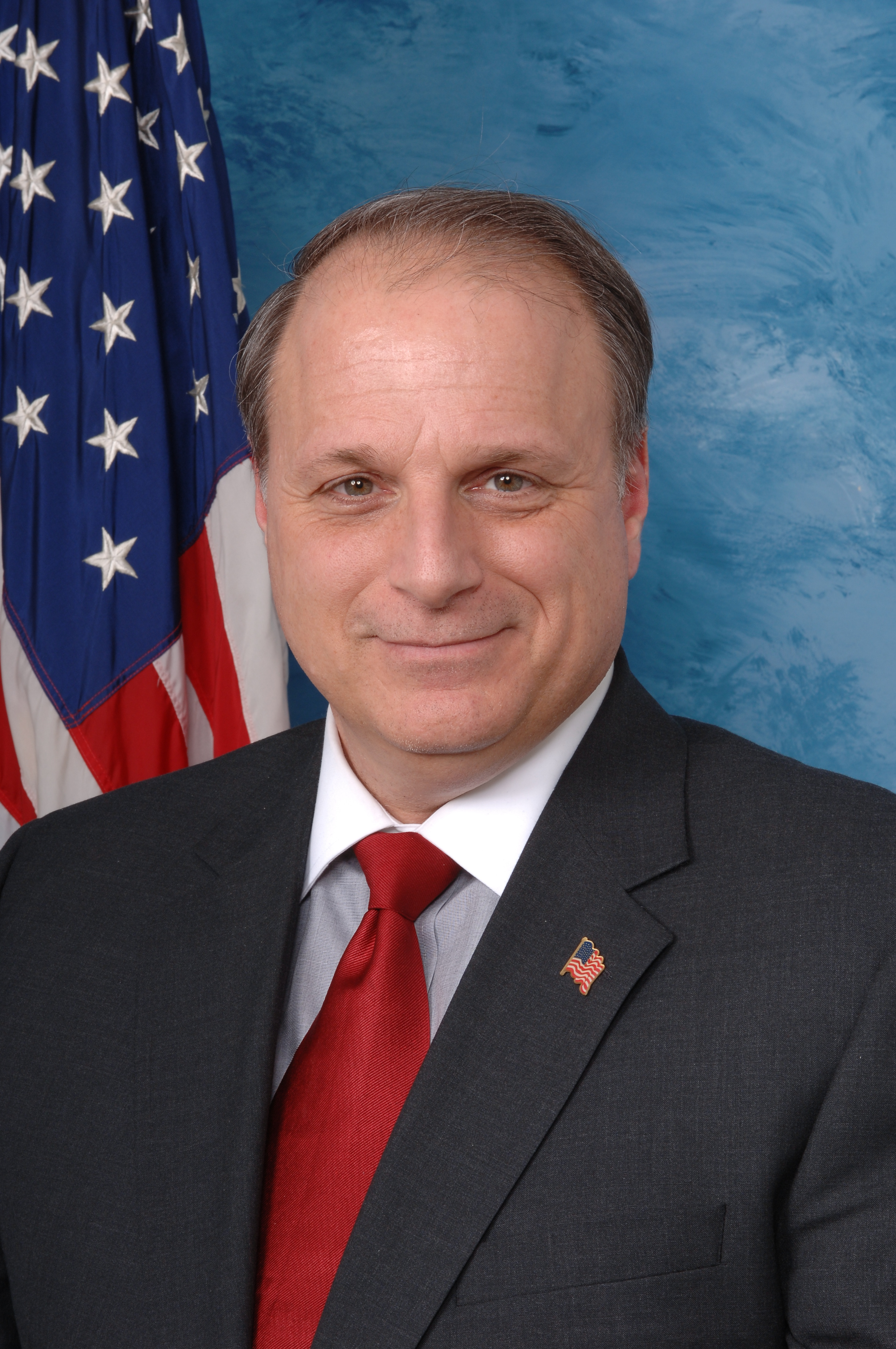

Member of the U.S. House of Representatives from New York's 29th district
- In office January 3, 2009 – March 8, 2010
- Preceded by: Randy Kuhl
- Succeeded by: Tom Reed

Personal details
- Born: Eric James Joseph Massa; September 16, 1959 (age 67) Charleston, South Carolina, U.S.
- Party: Democratic
- Spouse: Beverly Jacobson
- Education: United States Naval Academy (BS)

Military service
- Branch/service: United States Navy
- Years of service: 1981–2004
- Rank: Lieutenant Commander

Eric James Joseph Massa (born September 16, 1959) is a former American politician who served as a U.S. representative for New York's 29th congressional district. A Democrat, he served in Congress from January 2009 until his resignation in March 2010. Massa resigned during a pending House Ethics Committee investigation into allegations of sexual misconduct. Massa identified his declining health and the ongoing ethics investigation as the reasons for his resignation; however, he later said that there was a conspiracy "to oust him because he had voted against overhauling health care." It was reported in 2017 that Congress had paid nearly $100,000 to settle the harassment claims made by two male staffers against Massa.

== Early life and career ==
Eric James Joseph Massa was born in Charleston, South Carolina, on September 16, 1959. The son of a career naval officer, Massa grew up in various locations, including Argentina and New Orleans. After graduating from the U.S. Naval Academy at Annapolis, Massa was on active duty in the Navy for 24 years. He served in the Persian Gulf War and also served as aide to General Wesley Clark. Near the end of his Navy career, he was diagnosed with non-Hodgkin's lymphoma, from which he later recovered.

Upon retirement from the military, Massa moved to Corning, New York, to work for the Corning Glass Company in 2001. He lost his job due to downsizing and moved to Washington to work as a Republican staffer for the House Armed Services Committee in 2003. Massa was fired after it became known that he had written to his former boss, Democrat Wesley Clark, with advice on his presidential campaign. Thereafter, Massa joined the Democratic Party. He coordinated veterans' outreach efforts in New Hampshire and Virginia during Clark's unsuccessful 2004 presidential bid.

== U.S. House of Representatives ==
=== Elections ===
==== 2006 ====
In 2006, Massa ran for Congress in New York's 29th congressional district on the strength of his military background. On election night, incumbent Republican Rep. Randy Kuhl led Massa by a 52%-48% margin. Massa requested a recount and an accounting of absentee ballots because 6,000 votes separated the two and 10,000 were left to be counted. After a week of waiting, the ballots were approximately even and Congressman Kuhl was re-elected. Massa conceded the election with a telephone call to Congressman Kuhl.

==== 2008 ====
Almost immediately after conceding defeat in 2006, Massa prepared for a rematch against Kuhl in 2008. The race remained tight through the campaign; however, Massa emerged victorious, defeating Kuhl 51% to 49% (a margin of approximately 4000 votes), although Kuhl did not immediately concede defeat. All voting machines were impounded at Kuhl's request (pending a re-count), with 12,000 absentee ballots to be counted. The recount yielded a margin of victory of approximately 4,000 votes for Massa, and Kuhl conceded the race on November 21. Some press reports attributed Massa's victory to the plurality he attained among voters in Cattaraugus County, which voted for Kuhl in 2004 and 2006.

=== Tenure ===
Massa was assigned a seat on the House Armed Services Committee. He also inherited Kuhl's seat on the Agriculture Committee and was given a seat on the House Homeland Security Committee.

Massa voted in favor of, and generally supported, the American Recovery and Reinvestment Act of 2009, but has said he finds faults with the legislation. After the act failed to generate the expected stimulus to the Southern Tier economy, Massa claimed that virtually all of the stimulus funds were funneled to the state governments and diverted to interests in New York City.

In April 2009, Massa was noted for his suggestion to close the U.S.–Mexico border as a response to the 2009 swine flu pandemic, which originated in Mexico. He also was a leading critic of Time Warner Cable's abortive plan to charge a tiered service rate for its high-speed Internet service.

Though he generally supported a health care reform plan, he opposed, and voted against, the plans put forth by the Obama administration, due to the cost, and preferred a single-payer health care system instead.

During the 2009 Netroots Nation convention held in Pittsburgh, Massa told a group of activists that he "will vote adamantly against the interests of my district if I actually think what I am doing is going to be helpful" in regard to a single-payer health care system. Moments later Massa clarified that he meant he would vote against the "opinions" of his constituents if he thought it was the right thing to do. He also controversially exclaimed that Sen. Chuck Grassley's comments describing end-of-life care as "killing Grandma" constitute "an act of treason."

=== Sexual harassment allegations and resignation from Congress ===
On October 10, 2009, Massa announced his plans for re-election, saying, "I don't want to play games with people about speculation, I want to be very direct and candid."

On March 3, 2010, Massa announced that his cancer had returned and that he would not seek re-election. In his statement, Massa addressed allegations of sexual harassment, but claimed he would stay on for the remainder of his term.

The next day, March 4, 2010, House Majority Leader Steny Hoyer confirmed that the House Ethics Committee was investigating allegations against Massa of sexual misconduct as the result of a complaint that a senior member of Massa's staff had filed with the committee on February 8, 2010. The investigation was said to involve alleged sexual advances and harassment toward a younger male member of Massa's staff.

At a press conference, Massa described his behavior and his language as "salty," claiming that he had apologized to the parties in question, did not know of the specific allegations, and did not make the decision to retire based upon such allegations.

Massa announced on March 5, 2010, that he would resign his seat in Congress effective 5:00 p.m. on March 8, 2010. In a published statement on his website, Massa identified his declining health and the ongoing ethics investigation as the reasons for his departure. He apologized in response to the sexual harassment complaint, saying that "There is no doubt in my mind that I did in fact, use language in the privacy of my own home and in my inner office that, after 24 years in the navy, might make a Chief Petty Officer feel uncomfortable. In fact, there is no doubt that this ethics issue is my fault and mine alone."

Massa later claimed that there was a conspiracy to remove him from Congress "because he had voted against overhauling health care." Massa placed specific blame for his resignation on White House Chief of Staff Rahm Emanuel, stating that Emanuel "is the son of the devil's spawn... He is an individual who would sell his mother to get a vote. He would strap his children to the front end of a steam locomotive." Massa also commented on the following alleged confrontation with Emanuel in the congressional gym locker room: "I am sitting there showering, naked as a jaybird, and here comes Rahm Emanuel, not even with a towel wrapped around his tush, poking his finger in my chest, yelling at me because I wasn't going to vote for the president's budget... He goes there to intimidate members of Congress... He's hated me since day one, and now he wins. He'll get rid of me, and this bill will pass." A Democratic spokesperson denied the existence of the alleged conspiracy to remove Massa over his position on health care.

On March 10, 2010, The Washington Post reported that Massa was under investigation for allegations that he had groped multiple male staffers working in his office. The Post reported:

The freshman Democrat told Fox News Channel host Glenn Beck that "not only did I grope [a staffer], I tickled him until he couldn't breathe," then said hours later on CNN's "Larry King Live" that "it is not true" that he groped anyone on his staff. He told Beck that he resigned from the House because he made the mistake of "getting too familiar with my staff" members, but he told King that he left primarily for health reasons. Massa, 50, has survived non-Hodgkin's lymphoma, but he said he is afraid that he is facing his "third major cancer-recurrence scare."

In his interview with Beck, the married Massa acknowledged that he shared a Washington residence with several unmarried male staffers as a cost-saving measure.

Massa claimed that he contemplated vehicular suicide at least twice on his way back to his home in Corning, New York, following his resignation. Later campaign finance filings revealed that his campaign funds were being used to fund his wife's salary well after his resignation, as well as to pay legal fees stemming from disputes with his staffers. The payments to his wife continued until the end of 2012.

In 2017, the New York Daily News reported that Congress had paid nearly $100,000 to settle the harassment claims made by two male staffers against Massa.

== Electoral history ==
2006 U.S. House election: New York district 29
Party	Candidate	Votes	%	±%
Republican	Randy Kuhl (incumbent)	106,077	51.5	+0.8
Democratic	Eric Massa	100,044	48.5	+7.7
Majority		6,033	2.9	−7.0
Turnout		206,121	100	−23.7

2008 U.S. House election: New York district 29
Party	Candidate	Votes	%	±%
Democratic	Eric Massa	140,529	51.0	+2.5
Republican	Randy Kuhl (incumbent)	135,199	49.0	−2.5
Majority		5,330	1.9	−1.0
Turnout		275,728	100	+33.8

=== Committee assignments ===
- Committee on Agriculture
  - Subcommittee on Conservation, Credit, Energy, and Research
  - Subcommittee on Horticulture and Organic Agriculture
- Committee on Armed Services
  - Subcommittee on Seapower and Expeditionary Forces
  - Subcommittee on Air and Land Forces
- Committee on Homeland Security
  - Subcommittee on Border, Maritime and Global Counterterrorism
  - Subcommittee on Transportation Security and Infrastructure Protection

== See also ==
- List of federal political sex scandals in the United States

U.S. House of Representatives
Preceded by Randy Kuhl	Member of the U.S. House of Representatives from New York's 29th congressional district 2009–2010	Succeeded by Tom Reed
U.S. order of precedence (ceremonial)
Preceded by Kwanza Hall as Former U.S. Representative	Order of precedence of the United States as Former U.S. Representative	Succeeded by Scott Murphy as Former U.S. Representative
