= 2010 New York State Assembly election =

Election in New York

- November 2, 2010

150 seats from the New York State Assembly 75 seats needed for a majority
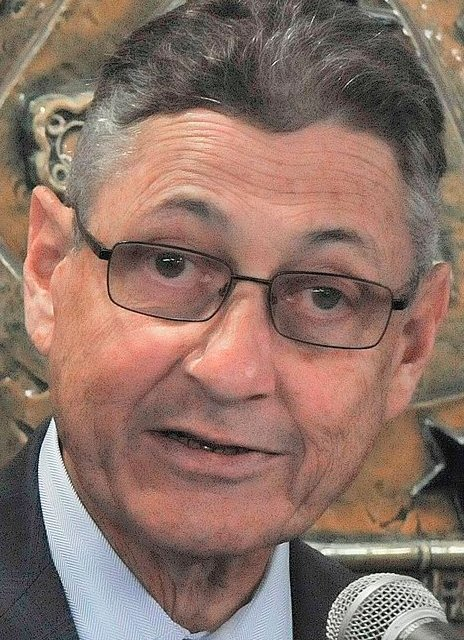

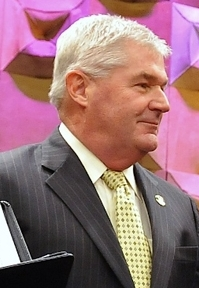

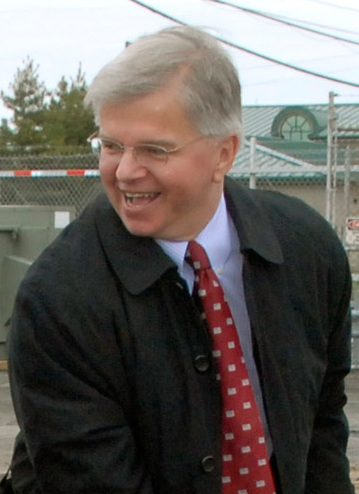
	Majority party	Minority party	Third party
Leader	Sheldon Silver	Brian Kolb	Fred Thiele (Note: Thiele, who was originally elected as a Republican, switched parties to Independence and caucused with Assembly Democrats.)
Party	Democratic	Republican	Independence
Leader since	February 11, 1994	April 6, 2009	October 2009
Leader's seat	64th district	129th district	2nd district
Seats before	106	42	2
Seats after	98	51	1
Seat change	▼8	▲9	▼1
- Results: Republican gain Democratic hold Republican hold Independence hold
Speaker before election
Sheldon Silver
Democratic
Speaker
Sheldon Silver
Democratic

The 2010 New York State Assembly elections were held on Tuesday, November 2, 2010, with the primary election on September 14, 2010. Voters in the 150 districts of the New York State Assembly elected their representatives. The elections coincided with the elections for other offices, including for governor, U.S. Senate, U.S. House of Representatives, and state senate. Assembly Democrats won 98 of the chamber's 150 seats on election day, while Republicans won 51 seats and Independence party member Fred Thiele won one seat.

== Predictions ==
Source	Ranking	As of
Governing	Safe D	November 1, 2010

== Assembly districts ==
District	Member	Party	First elected	Status	Winner
1	Marc Alessi	Dem	2005+	Incumbent lost reelection. Republican gain.	Daniel Losquadro
2	Fred Thiele (Note: Thiele caucuses with Assembly Democrats.)	Ind	1995+	Incumbent re-elected.	Fred Thiele
3	L. Dean Murray	Rep	2010+	Incumbent re-elected.	L. Dean Murray
4	Steve Englebright	Dem	1992+	Incumbent re-elected.	Steve Englebright
5	Ginny Fields	Dem	2004+	Incumbent lost reelection. Republican gain.	Al Graf
6	Philip Ramos	Dem	2002	Incumbent re-elected.	Philip Ramos
7	Michael J. Fitzpatrick	Rep	2002	Incumbent re-elected.	Michael J. Fitzpatrick
8	Phil Boyle	Rep	2006+	Incumbent re-elected.	Phil Boyle
9	Andrew Raia	Rep	2002	Incumbent re-elected.	Andrew Raia
10	James D. Conte	Rep	1988+	Incumbent re-elected.	James D. Conte
11	Robert Sweeney	Dem	1988+	Incumbent re-elected.	Robert Sweeney
12	Joe Saladino	Rep	2004+	Incumbent re-elected.	Joe Saladino
13	Charles D. Lavine	Dem	2004	Incumbent re-elected.	Charles D. Lavine
14	Robert Barra	Rep	2001+	Incumbent retired. Republican hold.	Brian Curran
15	Rob Walker	Rep	2005+	Incumbent retired. Republican hold.	Michael Montesano
16	Michelle Schimel	Dem	2007+	Incumbent re-elected.	Michelle Schimel
17	Thomas McKevitt	Rep	2006+	Incumbent re-elected.	Thomas McKevitt
18	Earlene Hooper	Dem	1988+	Incumbent re-elected.	Earlene Hooper
19	David McDonough	Rep	2002+	Incumbent re-elected.	David McDonough
20	Harvey Weisenberg	Dem	1989+	Incumbent re-elected.	Harvey Weisenberg
21	Thomas Alfano	Rep	1996+	Incumbent retired. Republican hold.	Ed Ra
22	Grace Meng	Dem	2008	Incumbent re-elected.	Grace Meng
23	Audrey Pheffer	Dem	1987+	Incumbent re-elected.	Audrey Pheffer
24	David Weprin	Dem	2010+	Incumbent re-elected.	David Weprin
25	Rory Lancman	Dem	2006	Incumbent re-elected.	Rory Lancman
26	Ann-Margaret Carrozza	Dem	1996	Incumbent retired. Democratic hold.	Edward Braunstein
27	Nettie Mayersohn	Dem	1982	Incumbent re-elected.	Nettie Mayersohn
28	Andrew Hevesi	Dem	2005+	Incumbent re-elected.	Andrew Hevesi
29	William Scarborough	Dem	1994	Incumbent re-elected.	William Scarborough
30	Margaret Markey	Dem	1998	Incumbent re-elected.	Margaret Markey
31	Michele Titus	Dem	2002+	Incumbent re-elected.	Michele Titus
32	Vivian E. Cook	Dem	1990	Incumbent re-elected.	Vivian E. Cook
33	Barbara Clark	Dem	1986	Incumbent re-elected.	Barbara Clark
34	Michael DenDekker	Dem	2008	Incumbent re-elected.	Michael DenDekker
35	Jeffrion L. Aubry	Dem	1992+	Incumbent re-elected.	Jeffrion L. Aubry
36	Michael Gianaris	Dem	2000	Incumbent retired to run for State Senate. Democratic hold.	Aravella Simotas
37	Catherine Nolan	Dem	1984	Incumbent re-elected.	Catherine Nolan
38	Michael G. Miller	Dem	2009+	Incumbent re-elected.	Michael G. Miller
39	Vacant, previously José Peralta	Dem	2002	Incumbent resigned to run for State Senate. Democratic hold.	Francisco Moya
40	Inez Barron	Dem	2008	Incumbent re-elected.	Inez Barron
41	Helene Weinstein	Dem	1980	Incumbent re-elected.	Helene Weinstein
42	Rhoda Jacobs	Dem	1978	Incumbent re-elected.	Rhoda Jacobs
43	Karim Camara	Dem	2005+	Incumbent re-elected.	Karim Camara
44	James Brennan	Dem	1984	Incumbent re-elected.	James Brennan
45	Steven Cymbrowitz	Dem	2000	Incumbent re-elected.	Steven Cymbrowitz
46	Alec Brook-Krasny	Dem	2006+	Incumbent re-elected.	Alec Brook-Krasny
47	William Colton	Dem	1996	Incumbent re-elected.	William Colton
48	Dov Hikind	Dem	1982	Incumbent re-elected.	Dov Hikind
49	Peter J. Abbate Jr.	Dem	1986	Incumbent re-elected.	Peter J. Abbate Jr.
50	Joe Lentol	Dem	1972	Incumbent re-elected.	Joe Lentol
51	Felix Ortiz	Dem	1994	Incumbent re-elected.	Felix Ortiz
52	Joan Millman	Dem	1996	Incumbent re-elected.	Joan Millman
53	Vito Lopez	Dem	1984	Incumbent re-elected.	Vito Lopez
54	Darryl C. Towns	Dem	1992	Incumbent re-elected.	Darryl Towns
55	William Boyland Jr.	Dem	2003+	Incumbent re-elected.	William Boyland Jr.
56	Annette Robinson	Dem	1991+	Incumbent re-elected.	Annette Robinson
57	Hakeem Jeffries	Dem	2006	Incumbent re-elected.	Hakeem Jeffries
58	N. Nick Perry	Dem	1992	Incumbent re-elected.	N. Nick Perry
59	Alan Maisel	Dem	2006+	Incumbent re-elected.	Alan Maisel
60	Janele Hyer-Spencer	Dem	2006	Incumbent lost reelection. Republican gain.	Nicole Malliotakis
61	Matthew Titone	Dem	2007+	Incumbent re-elected.	Matthew Titone
62	Louis Tobacco	Rep	2007+	Incumbent re-elected.	Louis Tobacco
63	Michael Cusick	Dem	2002	Incumbent re-elected.	Michael Cusick
64	Sheldon Silver	Dem	1976	Incumbent re-elected.	Sheldon Silver
65	Micah Kellner	Dem	2007+	Incumbent re-elected.	Micah Kellner
66	Deborah J. Glick	Dem	1990	Incumbent re-elected.	Deborah J. Glick
67	Linda Rosenthal	Dem	2006+	Incumbent re-elected.	Linda Rosenthal
68	Adam Clayton Powell IV	Dem	2000	Incumbent retired. Democratic hold.	Robert J. Rodriguez
69	Daniel J. O'Donnell	Dem	2002	Incumbent re-elected.	Daniel J. O'Donnell
70	Keith L. T. Wright	Dem	1992	Incumbent re-elected.	Keith L. T. Wright
71	Herman Farrell	Dem	1974	Incumbent re-elected.	Herman Farrell
72	Adriano Espaillat	Dem	1996	Incumbent retired to run for State Senate. Democratic hold.	Guillermo Linares
73	Jonathan Bing	Dem	2002	Incumbent re-elected.	Jonathan Bing
74	Brian Kavanagh	Dem	2006	Incumbent re-elected.	Brian Kavanagh
75	Richard N. Gottfried	Dem	1970	Incumbent re-elected.	Richard N. Gottfried
76	Peter Rivera	Dem	1992	Incumbent re-elected.	Peter Rivera
77	Vanessa Gibson	Dem	2009+	Incumbent re-elected.	Vanessa Gibson
78	Jose Rivera	Dem	2000	Incumbent re-elected.	Jose Rivera
79	Michael Benjamin	Dem	2003+	Incumbent retired. Democratic hold.	Eric Stevenson
80	Naomi Rivera	Dem	2004	Incumbent re-elected.	Naomi Rivera
81	Jeffrey Dinowitz	Dem	1994+	Incumbent re-elected.	Jeffrey Dinowitz
82	Michael Benedetto	Dem	2004	Incumbent re-elected.	Michael Benedetto
83	Carl Heastie	Dem	2000	Incumbent re-elected.	Carl Heastie
84	Carmen Arroyo	Dem	1994+	Incumbent re-elected.	Carmen Arroyo
85	Marcos Crespo	Dem	2009+	Incumbent re-elected.	Marcos Crespo
86	Nelson Castro	Dem	2008	Incumbent re-elected.	Nelson Castro
87	J. Gary Pretlow	Dem	1992	Incumbent re-elected.	J. Gary Pretlow
88	Amy Paulin	Dem	2000	Incumbent re-elected.	Amy Paulin
89	Robert Castelli	Rep	2010+	Incumbent re-elected.	Robert Castelli
90	Sandy Galef	Dem	1992	Incumbent re-elected.	Sandy Galef
91	George Latimer	Dem	2004	Incumbent re-elected.	George Latimer
92	Richard Brodsky	Dem	1982	Incumbent retired to run for Attorney General. Democratic hold.	Thomas J. Abinanti
93	Mike Spano	Dem	1992+	Incumbent re-elected.	Mike Spano
94	Kenneth Zebrowski Jr.	Dem	2007+	Incumbent re-elected.	Kenneth Zebrowski Jr.
95	Ellen Jaffee	Dem	2006	Incumbent re-elected.	Ellen Jaffee
96	Nancy Calhoun	Rep	1990	Incumbent re-elected.	Nancy Calhoun
97	Ann Rabbitt	Rep	2004	Incumbent re-elected.	Ann Rabbitt
98	Aileen Gunther	Dem	2003+	Incumbent re-elected.	Aileen Gunther
99	Greg Ball	Rep	2006	Incumbent re-elected.	Greg Ball
100	Frank Skartados	Dem	2008	Incumbent lost reelection. Republican gain.	Thomas J. Kirwan
101	Kevin Cahill	Dem	1998	Incumbent re-elected.	Kevin Cahill
102	Joel Miller	Rep	1994	Incumbent re-elected.	Joel Miller
103	Marcus Molinaro	Rep	2006	Incumbent re-elected.	Marcus Molinaro
104	John McEneny	Dem	1992	Incumbent re-elected.	John McEneny
105	George Amedore	Rep	2007+	Incumbent re-elected.	George Amedore
106	Ronald Canestrari	Dem	1988	Incumbent re-elected.	Ronald Canestrari
107	Clifford Crouch	Rep	1995+	Incumbent re-elected.	Clifford Crouch
108	Timothy P. Gordon	Ind	2006	Incumbent lost reelection. Republican gain.	Steven McLaughlin
109	Robert Reilly	Dem	1994+	Incumbent re-elected.	Robert Reilly
110	Jim Tedisco	Rep	1982	Incumbent re-elected.	Jim Tedisco
111	Bill Magee	Dem	1990	Incumbent re-elected.	Bill Magee
112	Tony Jordan	Rep	2008	Incumbent re-elected.	Tony Jordan
113	Teresa Sayward	Rep	2002	Incumbent re-elected.	Teresa Sayward
114	Janet Duprey	Rep	2006	Incumbent re-elected.	Janet Duprey
115	David Townsend	Rep	1990	Incumbent retired. Republican hold.	Claudia Tenney
116	RoAnn Destito	Dem	1992	Incumbent re-elected.	RoAnn Destito
117	Marc Butler	Rep	1995+	Incumbent re-elected.	Marc Butler
118	Addie Jenne	Dem	2008	Incumbent re-elected.	Addie Jenne
119	Joan Christensen	Dem	1990	Incumbent retired. Democratic Hold.	Sam Roberts
120	Bill Magnarelli	Dem	1998	Incumbent re-elected.	Bill Magnarelli
121	Albert A. Stirpe, Jr.	Dem	2006	Incumbent lost reelection. Republican gain.	Don Miller
122	Dede Scozzafava	Rep	1998	Incumbent retired. Republican hold.	Ken Blankenbush
123	Gary Finch	Rep	1998	Incumbent re-elected.	Gary Finch
124	William Barclay	Rep	2002	Incumbent re-elected.	William Barclay
125	Barbara Lifton	Dem	2002	Incumbent re-elected.	Barbara Lifton
126	Donna Lupardo	Dem	2004	Incumbent re-elected.	Donna Lupardo
127	Pete Lopez	Rep	2006	Incumbent re-elected.	Pete Lopez
128	Bob Oaks	Rep	1992	Incumbent re-elected.	Bob Oaks
129	Brian Kolb	Rep	2000+	Incumbent re-elected.	Brian Kolb
130	Joseph Errigo	Rep	2000	Incumbent retired. Republican hold.	Sean Hanna
131	Susan John	Dem	1990	Incumbent retired. Democratic hold.	Harry Bronson
132	Joseph Morelle	Dem	1990	Incumbent re-elected.	Joseph Morelle
133	David Gantt	Dem	1982	Incumbent re-elected.	David Gantt
134	Bill Reilich	Rep	2002	Incumbent re-elected.	Bill Reilich
135	David Koon	Dem	1996+	Incumbent lost reelection. Republican gain.	Mark Johns
136	James Bacalles	Rep	1995+	Incumbent retired to run for State Senate. Republican hold.	Phil Palmesano
137	Tom O'Mara	Rep	2004	Incumbent retired to run for State Senate. Republican hold.	Christopher S. Friend
138	Francine DelMonte	Dem	1998	Incumbent lost reelection. Republican gain.	John Ceretto
139	Stephen Hawley	Rep	2006+	Incumbent re-elected.	Stephen Hawley
140	Robin Schimminger	Dem	1976	Incumbent re-elected.	Robin Schimminger
141	Crystal Peoples-Stokes	Dem	2002	Incumbent re-elected.	Crystal Peoples-Stokes
142	Jane Corwin	Rep	2008	Incumbent re-elected.	Jane Corwin
143	Dennis Gabryszak	Dem	2006	Incumbent re-elected.	Dennis Gabryszak
144	Sam Hoyt	Dem	1992+	Incumbent re-elected.	Sam Hoyt
145	Mark J. F. Schroeder	Dem	2004	Incumbent re-elected.	Mark J. F. Schroeder
146	Jack Quinn III	Rep	2004	Incumbent retired to run for State Senate. Republican hold.	Kevin Smardz
147	Daniel Burling	Rep	1998	Incumbent re-elected.	Daniel Burling
148	James Hayes	Rep	1998	Incumbent re-elected.	James Hayes
149	Joseph Giglio	Rep	2005+	Incumbent re-elected.	Joseph Giglio
150	William Parment	Dem	1982	Incumbent retired. Republican gain.	Andy Goodell

- +Elected in a special election.
