= 2012 New York State Assembly election =

- November 6, 2012

150 seats from the New York State Assembly 75 seats needed for a majority
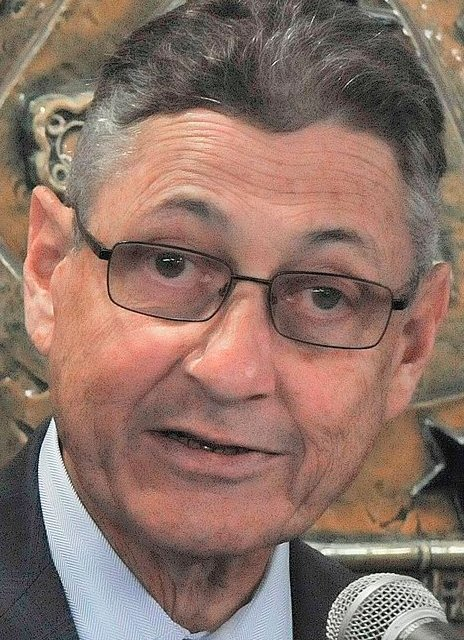

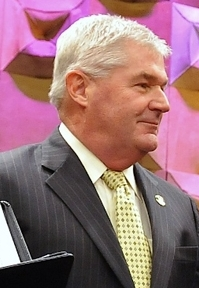

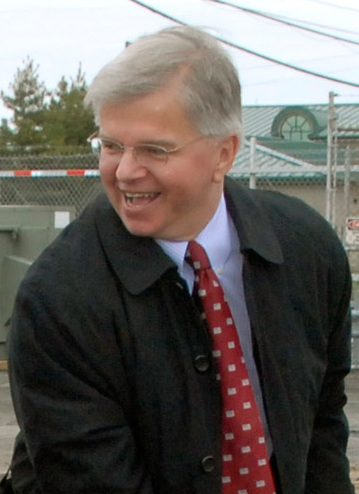
	Majority party	Minority party	Third party
Leader	Sheldon Silver	Brian Kolb	Fred Thiele (Note: Thiele caucuses with Assembly Democrats.)
Party	Democratic	Republican	Independence
Leader since	February 11, 1994	April 6, 2009	October 2009
Leader's seat	65th district	131st district	1st district
Seats before	100	49	1
Seats after	105	44	1
Seat change	▲5	▼5	Steady
- Results: Democratic gain Democratic hold Republican hold Independence hold
Speaker before election
Sheldon Silver
Democratic
Speaker
Sheldon Silver
Democratic

The 2012 New York State Assembly elections were held on Tuesday, November 6, 2012, with the primary election on September 13, 2012. Voters in the 150 districts of the New York State Assembly elected their representatives. Districts were redrawn as a result of the 2010 United States census. The elections coincided with the elections for other offices, including for President, US Senate, Congress, and the state senate. Assembly Democrats won 105 of the chamber's 150 seats on election day, while Republicans won 44 seats and Independence party member Fred Thiele won 1 seat.

== March 20 special elections ==
- 93rd District: This seat became vacant after Mike Spano was elected as the mayor of Yonkers. Democratic Party nominee Shelley B. Mayer defeated Republican Party nominee Donna Nolan.
- 100th District: This seat became vacant after Thomas Kirwan died in November 2011. Democratic Party nominee Frank Skartados defeated Republican Party member John Forman.
- 103rd District: This seat became vacant after Assemblymember Marcus Molinaro was elected Dutchess County Executive. Democratic Party nominee Didi Barrett narrowly prevailed over Republican candidate Richard Wager.
- 145th District: This seat became vacant after Mark J. F. Schroeder was elected Comptroller of the City of Buffalo. Democrat Michael P. Kearns, running on the Republican Party line, defeated Democratic Party nominee Chris Fahey.

== Predictions ==
Source	Ranking	As of
Governing	Safe D	October 24, 2012

== Retirements ==
- 7th District: Incumbent Republican Philip Boyle declined renomination to his South Shore Suffolk seat in order to accept the nomination to replace State Senator Owen Johnson. Republican attorney Andrew Garbarino defeated Democrat Christopher Bodkin.
- 10th District: Due to health reasons, incumbent Republican James Conte declined renomination to his Huntington-based seat. Attorney and former Suffolk County deputy county executive Joe Dujmic, the Democratic and Working Families Party candidate, faced adjunct professor and South Huntington School Board member Chad Lupinacci. Lupinacci prevailed.
- 22nd District: This newly drawn district is based in the central-western portion of Nassau County and encompasses South Floral Park, Elmont, and Valley Stream. The Republican Party designated Sean Wright, an assistant town attorney and village attorney, as their candidate. The Democrats nominated Michaelle "Mickey" Solages, the sister of freshman county legislator Carrie Solages. Solages prevailed.
- 25th District: Queens Community Board 11 Chairman Jerry Iannece announced he would seek the Democratic nomination for the seat vacated by Rory Lancman. While endorsed by the party, Iannece faced a primary challenge Nily Rozic, former chief of staff to assemblyman Brian Kavanagh. The winner of this primary, Rozic, defeated retired Republican postal worker Abraham Fuchs in the general election.
- 40th District: Assemblywoman Grace Meng sought the Democratic nomination in the vacant 6th Congressional District. The Queens Democratic Party endorsed Ron Kim, but he faced a primary from newspaper owner Myungsuk Lee as well as Ethel Chen. The Republicans endorsed Phil Gim, who faced a primary challenge from community activist Sunny Hahn. Each primary set at least one candidate of Korean descent against one candidate of Chinese descent. Kim and Gim won their respective primaries, and Kim won the general election.
- 62nd District: Assemblyman Lou Tobacco announced he would not seek reelection. The Republican party endorsed City Councilman Vincent Ignizio's chief of staff Joseph Borelli. Borelli defeated Democrat Anthony Mascolo.
- 91st District: This seat was vacated by George S. Latimer, who ran for State Senate instead. Longtime State Sen. Suzi Oppenheimer's chief of staff, Democrat Steve Otis, defeated Republican Rye Councilman William Villanova.
- 99th District: Republican incumbent Nancy Calhoun was redistricted from the 96th Assembly District into the 99th Assembly District and decided to retire. Goshen Mayor Kyle Roddey and Colin Schmitt, a former staff intern for Asm. Annie Rabbitt, announced that they would seek the Republican nomination. Roddey, who received the endorsement of the Orange County Republican Committee, the Independence Party, and the Conservative Party, won the primary. The Democratic Party endorsed Woodbury Councilman James Skoufis for the seat. Skoufis defeated Roddey in the general election.
- 105th District: Republican incumbent Joel Miller announced that he would not seek re-election in this newly reconfigured Dutchess County district. Former Assemblyman Pat Manning, former 2008 Congressional candidate Kieran Lalor, and Rich Wager sought the Republican nomination. Lalor received the Republican nomination and defeated Democrat Paul Curran.
- 109th District: The 104th Assembly District was reshaped into the 109th Assembly District. Democratic Jack McEneny, who represented District 104, announced he would not seek re-election. Six candidates ran for the Democratic nomination for this seat, including Chris Higgins, Pat Fahy, Jim Coyne, William McCarthy Jr., Frank Commisso Jr., and Margarita Perez. 2010 congressional candidate Ted Danz ran as a Republican. Fahy won the Democratic primary and defeated Danz in the general election.
- 110th District: Assembly District 109 was reshaped into the current District 110. Democratic Asm. Robert Reilly announced he would not seek re-election. Kevin Frazier (a staff member for Asm. Ronald Canestrari), Albany County Legislator Timothy Nichols, and Phillip G. Steck sought the Democratic nomination. Reilly's 2010 Republican opponent, Jennifer Whalen, ran again. Steck won the Democratic primary and defeated Whalen in the general election.
- 113th District: Republican Teresa Sayward announced she would not seek re-election. Queensbury town supervisor Dan Stec and former Congressional candidate Doug Hoffman sought the Republican nomination; Stec prevailed and defeated Democrat Dennis Tarantino in November.
- 133rd District: Republican Sean Hanna chose to run for New York State Senate instead of seeking re-election. Bill Nojay, a talk radio host on WYSL and WLEA, facted Richard Burke, the former mayor of Avon, in the Republican primary. Steuben County legislator Randy Weaver, whose last run for Assembly (against Philip Palmesano) in 2010 led to him being thrown off the ballot on a technicality, was the lone Democrat in the race. Nojay won the Republican primary, but Burke has the Conservative Party line. Nojay won the general election.
- 147th District: Republican Daniel Burling announced he would not seek re-election. Tea Party activist and frequent state senate candidate David DiPietro sought the seat as a Republican and obtained the Conservative Party endorsement. Dan Humiston and Christina Abt faced each other in a relatively rare Independence Party primary, with Abt securing the Working Families line and the Democratic line as well. Humiston, DiPietro, David Mariacher, and Christopher Lane sought the Republican nomination. DiPietro prevailed in the November election.

== Assembly Districts ==
District	Member	Party	First elected	Status	Winner
1	Fred Thiele _{Redistricted from the 2nd district.}	Dem	1995+	Incumbent re-elected.	Fred Thiele
2	Daniel Losquadro _{Redistricted from the 1st district.}	Rep	2010	Incumbent re-elected.	Daniel Losquadro
3	L. Dean Murray	Rep	2010+	Incumbent lost reelection. Democratic gain.	Edward Hennessey
4	Steve Englebright	Dem	1992+	Incumbent re-elected.	Steve Englebright
5	Al Graf	Rep	2010	Incumbent re-elected.	Al Graf
6	Philip Ramos	Dem	2002	Incumbent re-elected.	Philip Ramos
7	Phil Boyle _{Redistricted from the 8th district.}	Rep	2006+	Incumbent retired to run for State Senate. Republican hold.	Andrew Garbarino
8	Michael J. Fitzpatrick _{Redistricted from the 7th district.}	Rep	2002	Incumbent re-elected.	Michael J. Fitzpatrick
9	Joe Saladino _{Redistricted from the 12th district.}	Rep	2004+	Incumbent re-elected.	Joe Saladino
10	James D. Conte	Rep	1988+	Incumbent retired. Republican hold.	Chad Lupinacci
11	Robert Sweeney	Dem	1988+	Incumbent re-elected.	Robert Sweeney
12	Andrew Raia _{Redistricted from the 9th district.}	Rep	2002	Incumbent re-elected.	Andrew Raia
13	Charles D. Lavine	Dem	2004	Incumbent re-elected.	Charles D. Lavine
14	David McDonough _{Redistricted from the 19th district.}	Rep	2002+	Incumbent re-elected.	David McDonough
15	Michael Montesano	Rep	2010+	Incumbent re-elected.	Michael Montesano
16	Michelle Schimel	Dem	2007+	Incumbent re-elected.	Michelle Schimel
17	Thomas McKevitt	Rep	2006+	Incumbent re-elected.	Thomas McKevitt
18	Earlene Hooper	Dem	1988+	Incumbent re-elected.	Earlene Hooper
19	Ed Ra _{Redistricted from the 21st district.}	Rep	2010	Incumbent re-elected.	Ed Ra
20	Harvey Weisenberg	Dem	1989+	Incumbent re-elected.	Harvey Weisenberg
21	Brian Curran _{Redistricted from the 14th district.}	Rep	2010	Incumbent re-elected.	Brian Curran
22	New seat _{Redistricting.}			New seat. New member elected. Democratic gain.	Michaelle C. Solages
23	Phil Goldfeder	Dem	2011+	Incumbent re-elected.	Phil Goldfeder
24	David Weprin	Dem	2010+	Incumbent re-elected.	David Weprin
25	Rory Lancman	Dem	2006	Incumbent retired to run for Congress. Democratic hold.	Nily Rozic
26	Edward Braunstein	Dem	2010	Incumbent re-elected.	Edward Braunstein
27	Michael Simanowitz	Dem	2011+	Incumbent re-elected.	Michael Simanowitz
28	Andrew Hevesi	Dem	2005+	Incumbent re-elected.	Andrew Hevesi
29	William Scarborough	Dem	1994	Incumbent re-elected.	William Scarborough
30	Margaret Markey	Dem	1998	Incumbent re-elected.	Margaret Markey
31	Michele Titus	Dem	2002+	Incumbent re-elected.	Michele Titus
32	Vivian E. Cook	Dem	1990	Incumbent re-elected.	Vivian E. Cook
33	Barbara Clark	Dem	1986	Incumbent re-elected.	Barbara Clark
34	Michael DenDekker	Dem	2008	Incumbent re-elected.	Michael DenDekker
35	Jeffrion L. Aubry	Dem	1992+	Incumbent re-elected.	Jeffrion L. Aubry
36	Aravella Simotas	Dem	2010	Incumbent re-elected.	Aravella Simotas
37	Catherine Nolan	Dem	1984	Incumbent re-elected.	Catherine Nolan
38	Michael G. Miller	Dem	2009+	Incumbent re-elected.	Michael G. Miller
39	Francisco Moya	Dem	2010	Incumbent re-elected.	Francisco Moya
40	Grace Meng _{Redistricted from the 22nd district.}	Dem	2008	Incumbent retired to run for Congress. Democratic hold.	Ron Kim
41	Helene Weinstein	Dem	1980	Incumbent re-elected.	Helene Weinstein
42	Rhoda Jacobs	Dem	1978	Incumbent re-elected.	Rhoda Jacobs
43	Karim Camara	Dem	2005+	Incumbent re-elected.	Karim Camara
44	James Brennan	Dem	1984	Incumbent re-elected.	James Brennan
45	Steven Cymbrowitz	Dem	2000	Incumbent re-elected.	Steven Cymbrowitz
46	Alec Brook-Krasny	Dem	2006+	Incumbent re-elected.	Alec Brook-Krasny
47	William Colton	Dem	1996	Incumbent re-elected.	William Colton
48	Dov Hikind	Dem	1982	Incumbent re-elected.	Dov Hikind
49	Peter J. Abbate Jr.	Dem	1986	Incumbent re-elected.	Peter J. Abbate Jr.
50	Joe Lentol	Dem	1972	Incumbent re-elected.	Joe Lentol
51	Felix Ortiz	Dem	1994	Incumbent re-elected.	Felix Ortiz
52	Joan Millman	Dem	1996	Incumbent re-elected.	Joan Millman
53	Vito Lopez	Dem	1984	Incumbent re-elected.	Vito Lopez
54	Rafael Espinal	Dem	2011+	Incumbent re-elected.	Rafael Espinal
55	William Boyland Jr.	Dem	2003+	Incumbent re-elected.	William Boyland Jr.
56	Annette Robinson	Dem	1991+	Incumbent re-elected.	Annette Robinson
57	Hakeem Jeffries	Dem	2006	Incumbent retired to run for Congress. Democratic hold.	Walter Mosley
58	N. Nick Perry	Dem	1992	Incumbent re-elected.	N. Nick Perry
59	Alan Maisel	Dem	2006+	Incumbent re-elected.	Alan Maisel
60	Inez Barron _{Redistricted from the 40th district.}	Dem	2008	Incumbent re-elected.	Inez Barron
61	Matthew Titone	Dem	2007+	Incumbent re-elected.	Matthew Titone
62	Louis Tobacco	Rep	2007+	Incumbent retired. Republican hold.	Joe Borelli
63	Michael Cusick	Dem	2002	Incumbent re-elected.	Michael Cusick
64	Nicole Malliotakis _{Redistricted from the 60th district.}	Rep	2010	Incumbent re-elected.	Nicole Malliotakis
65	Sheldon Silver _{Redistricted from the 64th district.}	Dem	1976	Incumbent re-elected.	Sheldon Silver
66	Deborah J. Glick	Dem	1990	Incumbent re-elected.	Deborah J. Glick
67	Linda Rosenthal	Dem	2006+	Incumbent re-elected.	Linda Rosenthal
68	Robert J. Rodriguez	Dem	2010	Incumbent re-elected.	Robert J. Rodriguez
69	Daniel J. O'Donnell	Dem	2002	Incumbent re-elected.	Daniel J. O'Donnell
70	Keith L. T. Wright	Dem	1992	Incumbent re-elected.	Keith L. T. Wright
71	Herman Farrell	Dem	1974	Incumbent re-elected.	Herman Farrell
72	Guillermo Linares	Dem	2010	Incumbent retired to run for State Senate. Democratic hold.	Gabriela Rosa
73	Dan Quart	Dem	2011+	Incumbent re-elected.	Dan Quart
74	Brian Kavanagh	Dem	2006	Incumbent re-elected.	Brian Kavanagh
75	Richard N. Gottfried	Dem	1970	Incumbent re-elected.	Richard N. Gottfried
76	Micah Kellner _{Redistricted from the 65th district.}	Dem	2007+	Incumbent re-elected.	Micah Kellner
77	Vanessa Gibson	Dem	2009+	Incumbent re-elected.	Vanessa Gibson
78	Jose Rivera	Dem	2000	Incumbent re-elected.	Jose Rivera
79	Eric Stevenson	Dem	2010	Incumbent re-elected.	Eric Stevenson
80	Naomi Rivera	Dem	2004	Incumbent lost renomination. Democratic hold.	Mark Gjonaj
81	Jeffrey Dinowitz	Dem	1994+	Incumbent re-elected.	Jeffrey Dinowitz
82	Michael Benedetto	Dem	2004	Incumbent re-elected.	Michael Benedetto
83	Carl Heastie	Dem	2000	Incumbent re-elected.	Carl Heastie
84	Carmen Arroyo	Dem	1994+	Incumbent re-elected.	Carmen Arroyo
85	Marcos Crespo	Dem	2009+	Incumbent re-elected.	Marcos Crespo
86	Nelson Castro	Dem	2008	Incumbent re-elected.	Nelson Castro
87	Vacant, previously Peter Rivera _{Redistricted from the 76th district.}	Dem	1992	Incumbent resigned on June 30, 2012, to become Commissioner of the NYS Department of Labor. Democratic hold.	Luis Sepulveda
88	Amy Paulin	Dem	2000	Incumbent re-elected.	Amy Paulin
89	J. Gary Pretlow _{Redistricted from the 87th district.}	Dem	1992	Incumbent re-elected.	J. Gary Pretlow
90	Shelley Mayer _{Redistricted from the 93rd district.}	Dem	2012+	Incumbent re-elected.	Shelley Mayer
91	George Latimer	Dem	2004	Incumbent retired to run for State Senate. Democratic hold.	Steven Otis
92	Thomas J. Abinanti	Dem	2010	Incumbent re-elected.	Thomas J. Abinanti
93	Robert Castelli	Rep	2010+	Incumbent lost reelection. Democratic gain.	David Buchwald
94	Steve Katz _{Redistricted from the 99th district.}	Rep	2010	Incumbent re-elected.	Steve Katz
95	Sandy Galef _{Redistricted from the 90th district.}	Dem	1992	Incumbent re-elected.	Sandy Galef
96	Kenneth Zebrowski Jr. _{Redistricted from the 94th district.}	Dem	2007+	Incumbent re-elected.	Kenneth Zebrowski Jr.
97	Ellen Jaffee _{Redistricted from the 95th district.}	Dem	2006	Incumbent re-elected.	Ellen Jaffee
98	Ann Rabbitt _{Redistricted from the 97th district.}	Rep	2004	Incumbent re-elected.	Ann Rabbitt
99	Nancy Calhoun _{Redistricted from the 96th district.}	Rep	1990	Incumbent retired. Democratic gain.	James Skoufis
100	Aileen Gunther _{Redistricted from the 98th district.}	Dem	2003+	Incumbent re-elected.	Aileen Gunther
101	Claudia Tenney _{Redistricted from the 115th district.}	Rep	2010	Incumbent re-elected.	Claudia Tenney
102	Pete Lopez _{Redistricted from the 127th district.}	Rep	2006	Incumbent re-elected.	Pete Lopez
103	Kevin A. Cahill _{Redistricted from the 101st district.}	Dem	1998	Incumbent re-elected.	Kevin A. Cahill
104	Frank Skartados _{Redistricted from the 100th district.}	Dem	2012+	Incumbent re-elected.	Frank Skartados
105	Open seat. _{Redistricting.}			New member elected. Republican gain.	Kieran Lalor
106	Didi Barrett _{Redistricted from the 103rd district.}	Dem	2012+	Incumbent re-elected.	Didi Barrett
106	Joel Miller _{Redistricted from the 102nd district.}	Rep	1994	Incumbent retired. Republican loss.	Didi Barrett
107	Steven McLaughlin _{Redistricted from the 108th district.}	Rep	2010	Incumbent re-elected.	Steven McLaughlin
108	Ronald Canestrari _{Redistricted from the 106th district.}	Dem	1988	Incumbent retired. Democratic hold.	John T. McDonald III
109	John McEneny_{Redistricted from the 104th district.}	Dem	1992	Incumbent retired. Democratic hold.	Patricia Fahy
110	Robert Reilly _{Redistricted from the 109th district.}	Dem	2004	Incumbent retired. Democratic hold.	Phillip Steck
111	George Amedore _{Redistricted from the 105th district.}	Rep	2007+	Incumbent retired to run for State Senate. Democratic gain.	Angelo Santabarbara
112	Jim Tedisco _{Redistricted from the 110th district.}	Rep	1982	Incumbent re-elected.	Jim Tedisco
113	Tony Jordan _{Redistricted from the 112th district.}	Rep	2008	Incumbent re-elected.	Tony Jordan
114	Teresa Sayward _{Redistricted from the 113th district.}	Rep	2002	Incumbent retired. Republican hold.	Dan Stec
115	Janet Duprey _{Redistricted from the 114th district.}	Rep	2006	Incumbent re-elected.	Janet Duprey
116	Addie Jenne _{Redistricted from the 118th district.}	Dem	2008	Incumbent re-elected.	Addie Jenne
117	Ken Blankenbush _{Redistricted from the 122nd district.}	Rep	2010	Incumbent re-elected.	Ken Blankenbush
118	Marc W. Butler _{Redistricted from the 117th district.}	Rep	1995+	Incumbent re-elected.	Marc W. Butler
119	Anthony Brindisi _{Redistricted from the 116th district.}	Dem	2011+	Incumbent re-elected.	Anthony Brindisi
120	William A. Barclay _{Redistricted from the 124th district.}	Rep	2002	Incumbent re-elected.	William A. Barclay
121	Bill Magee _{Redistricted from the 111th district.}	Dem	1990	Incumbent re-elected.	Bill Magee
122	Clifford Crouch _{Redistricted from the 107th district.}	Rep	1995+	Incumbent re-elected.	Clifford Crouch
123	Donna Lupardo _{Redistricted from the 126th district.}	Dem	2004	Incumbent re-elected.	Donna Lupardo
124	Christopher S. Friend _{Redistricted from the 137th district.}	Rep	2010	Incumbent re-elected.	Christopher S. Friend
125	Barbara Lifton	Dem	2002	Incumbent re-elected.	Barbara Lifton
126	Gary Finch _{Redistricted from the 123rd district.}	Rep	1999+	Incumbent re-elected.	Gary Finch
127	Don Miller _{Redistricted from the 121st district.}	Rep	2010	Incumbent lost reelection. Democratic gain.	Albert A. Stirpe Jr.
128	Sam Roberts _{Redistricted from the 119th district.}	Dem	2010	Incumbent re-elected.	Sam Roberts
129	William Magnarelli _{Redistricted from the 120th district.}	Dem	1998	Incumbent re-elected.	William Magnarelli
130	Bob Oaks _{Redistricted from the 128th district.}	Rep	1992	Incumbent re-elected.	Bob Oaks
131	Brian Kolb _{Redistricted from the 129th district.}	Rep	2000+	Incumbent re-elected.	Brian Kolb
132	Phil Palmesano _{Redistricted from the 136th district.}	Rep	2010	Incumbent re-elected.	Phil Palmesano
133	Sean Hanna _{Redistricted from the 130th district.}	Rep	2010	Incumbent retired to run for State Senate. Republican hold.	Bill Nojay
134	Bill Reilich	Rep	2002	Incumbent re-elected.	Bill Reilich
135	Mark Johns	Rep	2010	Incumbent re-elected.	Mark Johns
136	Joseph Morelle _{Redistricted from the 132nd district.}	Dem	1990	Incumbent re-elected.	Joseph Morelle
137	David Gantt _{Redistricted from the 133rd district.}	Dem	1982	Incumbent re-elected.	David Gantt
138	Harry Bronson _{Redistricted from the 131st district.}	Dem	2010	Incumbent re-elected.	Harry Bronson
139	Stephen Hawley	Rep	2006+	Incumbent re-elected.	Stephen Hawley
140	Robin Schimminger	Dem	1976	Incumbent re-elected.	Robin Schimminger
141	Crystal Peoples-Stokes	Dem	2002	Incumbent re-elected.	Crystal Peoples-Stokes
142	Michael Kearns _{Redistricted from the 145th district.}	Rep	2012+	Incumbent re-elected.	Michael Kearns
143	Dennis Gabryszak	Dem	2006	Incumbent re-elected.	Dennis Gabryszak
144	Jane Corwin _{Redistricted from the 142nd district.}	Rep	2008	Incumbent re-elected.	Jane Corwin
145	John Ceretto _{Redistricted from the 138th district.}	Rep	2010	Incumbent re-elected.	John Ceretto
146	Raymond Walter _{Redistricted from the 148th district.}	Rep	2010	Incumbent re-elected.	Raymond Walter
147	Daniel Burling	Rep	1998	Incumbent retired. Republican hold.	David DiPietro
147	Kevin Smardz _{Redistricted from the 146th district.}	Rep	2010	Incumbent retired. Republican loss.	David DiPietro
148	Joseph Giglio _{Redistricted from the 149th district.}	Rep	2005+	Incumbent re-elected.	Joseph Giglio
149	Sean Ryan _{Redistricted from the 144th district.}	Dem	2011+	Incumbent re-elected.	Sean Ryan
150	Andy Goodell	Rep	2010	Incumbent re-elected.	Andy Goodell

- +Elected in a special election.
