= 199th New York State Legislature =

New York state legislative session

←	198th	200th	→
- New York State Capitol (2009)

Overview
- Legislative body: New York State Legislature
- Jurisdiction: New York, United States
- Term: January 1, 2011 – December 31, 2012

Senate
- Members: 62
- President: Lt. Gov. Robert Duffy (D)
- Temporary President: Dean Skelos (R)
- Party control: Republican

Assembly
- Members: 150
- Speaker: Sheldon Silver (D)
- Party control: Democratic

Sessions
- 1st: January 5 – , 2011
- 2nd: January 4 – , 2012

The 199th New York State Legislature, consisting of the New York State Senate and the New York State Assembly, met from January 5, 2011, to December 31, 2012, during the first two years of Andrew Cuomo's governorship, in Albany.

== State Senate ==
An extraordinary session of the State Senate was held on December 7, 2011 to codify a tax code reform promoted by Cuomo.

=== Senators ===
The asterisk (*) denotes members of the previous Legislature who continued in office as members of this Legislature. Michael Gianaris, Adriano Espaillat, Greg Ball and Tom O'Mara changed from the Assembly to the Senate.

Note: For brevity, the chairmanships omit the words "...the Committee on (the)..."

District	Senator	Party	Notes
1st	Kenneth LaValle*	Republican	
2nd	John J. Flanagan*	Republican	
3rd	Lee Zeldin	Republican	
4th	Owen H. Johnson*	Republican	
5th	Carl L. Marcellino*	Republican	
6th	Kemp Hannon*	Republican	
7th	Jack Martins	Republican	
8th	Charles J. Fuschillo Jr.*	Republican	
9th	Dean Skelos*	Republican	elected Temporary President
10th	Shirley Huntley*	Democrat	
11th	Tony Avella	Democrat	
12th	Michael Gianaris*	Democrat	
13th	Jose Peralta*	Democrat	
14th	Malcolm Smith*	Democrat	
15th	Joseph Addabbo Jr.*	Democrat	
16th	Toby Ann Stavisky*	Democrat	
17th	Martin Malave Dilan*	Democrat	
18th	Velmanette Montgomery*	Democrat	
19th	John L. Sampson*	Democrat	Minority Leader
20th	Eric Adams*	Democrat	
21st	Kevin Parker*	Democrat	
22nd	Martin Golden*	Republican	
23rd	Diane Savino*	Dem. (IDC)	
24th	Andrew Lanza*	Republican	
25th	Daniel Squadron*	Democrat	
26th	Liz Krueger*	Democrat	
27th	Carl Kruger*	Democrat	resigned on December 20, 2011
27th	David Storobin	Republican	on March 20, 2012, elected to fill vacancy
28th	José M. Serrano*	Democrat	
29th	Thomas Duane*	Democrat	
30th	Bill Perkins*	Democrat	
31st	Adriano Espaillat*	Democrat	
32nd	Rubén Díaz Sr.*	Democrat	
33rd	Gustavo Rivera	Democrat	
34th	Jeffrey D. Klein*	Dem. (IDC)	
35th	Andrea Stewart-Cousins*	Democrat	
36th	Ruth Hassell-Thompson*	Democrat	
37th	Suzi Oppenheimer*	Democrat	
38th	David Carlucci	Dem. (IDC)	
39th	William J. Larkin Jr.*	Republican	
40th	Greg Ball*	Republican	
41st	Stephen M. Saland*	Republican	
42nd	John Bonacic*	Republican	
43rd	Roy J. McDonald*	Republican	
44th	Hugh T. Farley*	Republican	
45th	Betty Little*	Republican	
46th	Neil Breslin*	Democrat	
47th	Joseph Griffo*	Republican	
48th	Patty Ritchie	Republican	
49th	David J. Valesky*	Dem. (IDC)	
50th	John A. DeFrancisco*	Republican	
51st	James L. Seward*	Republican	
52nd	Thomas W. Libous*	Republican	
53rd	Tom O'Mara*	Republican	
54th	Michael F. Nozzolio*	Republican	
55th	James S. Alesi*	Republican	
56th	Joseph Robach*	Republican	
57th	Catharine Young*	Republican	
58th	Timothy M. Kennedy	Democrat	
59th	Patrick M. Gallivan	Republican	
60th	Mark Grisanti	Republican	
61st	Michael Ranzenhofer*	Republican	
62nd	George D. Maziarz*	Republican	

=== Employees ===
- Secretary: ?

== State Assembly ==
=== Assembly members ===
The asterisk (*) denotes members of the previous Legislature who continued in office as members of this Legislature.

Note: For brevity, the chairmanships omit the words "...the Committee on (the)..."

District	Assembly member	Party	Notes
1st	Daniel Losquadro	Republican	
2nd	Fred Thiele*	Ind./Dem.	
3rd	L. Dean Murray*	Republican	
4th	Steve Englebright*	Democrat	
5th	Al Graf	Republican	
6th	Philip Ramos*	Democrat	
7th	Michael J. Fitzpatrick*	Republican	
8th	Phil Boyle*	Republican	
9th	Andrew Raia*	Republican	
10th	James D. Conte*	Republican	died on October 16, 2012
11th	Robert K. Sweeney*	Democrat	
12th	Joseph Saladino*	Republican	
13th	Charles D. Lavine*	Democrat	
14th	Brian F. Curran	Republican	
15th	Michael Montesano*	Republican	
16th	Michelle Schimel*	Democrat	
17th	Thomas McKevitt*	Republican	
18th	Earlene Hill Hooper*	Democrat	
19th	David McDonough*	Republican	
20th	Harvey Weisenberg*	Democrat	
21st	Ed Ra	Republican	
22nd	Grace Meng*	Democrat	on November 6, 2012, elected to the 113th U.S. Congress
23rd	Audrey Pheffer*	Democrat	on May 12, 2011, took office as County Clerk of Queens County
23rd	Phil Goldfeder	Democrat	on September 13, 2011, elected to fill vacancy
24th	David Weprin*	Democrat	
25th	Rory Lancman*	Democrat	
26th	Edward Braunstein	Democrat	
27th	Nettie Mayersohn*	Democrat	resigned on March 30, 2011
27th	Michael Simanowitz	Democrat	on September 13, 2011, elected to fill vacancy
28th	Andrew Hevesi*	Democrat	
29th	William Scarborough*	Democrat	
30th	Margaret Markey*	Democrat	
31st	Michele Titus*	Democrat	
32nd	Vivian E. Cook*	Democrat	
33rd	Barbara M. Clark*	Democrat	
34th	Michael DenDekker*	Democrat	
35th	Jeffrion L. Aubry*	Democrat	
36th	Aravella Simotas	Democrat	
37th	Catherine Nolan*	Democrat	
38th	Michael G. Miller*	Democrat	
39th	Francisco Moya	Democrat	
40th	Inez Barron*	Democrat	
41st	Helene Weinstein*	Democrat	
42nd	Rhoda S. Jacobs*	Democrat	
43rd	Karim Camara*	Democrat	
44th	James F. Brennan*	Democrat	
45th	Steven Cymbrowitz*	Democrat	
46th	Alec Brook-Krasny*	Democrat	
47th	William Colton*	Democrat	
48th	Dov Hikind*	Democrat	
49th	Peter J. Abbate Jr.*	Democrat	
50th	Joseph R. Lentol*	Democrat	
51st	Félix W. Ortiz*	Democrat	
52nd	Joan Millman*	Democrat	
53rd	Vito J. Lopez*	Democrat	
54th	Darryl C. Towns*	Democrat	in February 2011, appointed Commissioner of NYS Homes and Community Renewal
54th	Rafael Espinal	Democrat	on September 13, 2011, elected to fill vacancy
55th	William Boyland Jr.*	Democrat	
56th	Annette Robinson*	Democrat	
57th	Hakeem Jeffries*	Democrat	on November 6, 2012, elected to the 113th U.S. Congress
58th	N. Nick Perry*	Democrat	
59th	Alan Maisel*	Democrat	
60th	Nicole Malliotakis	Republican	
61st	Matthew Titone*	Democrat	
62nd	Louis Tobacco*	Republican	
63rd	Michael Cusick*	Democrat	
64th	Sheldon Silver*	Democrat	re-elected Speaker
65th	Micah Kellner*	Democrat	
66th	Deborah J. Glick*	Democrat	
67th	Linda Rosenthal*	Democrat	
68th	Robert J. Rodriguez	Democrat	
69th	Daniel J. O'Donnell*	Democrat	
70th	Keith L. T. Wright*	Democrat	
71st	Herman D. Farrell Jr.*	Democrat	Chairman of Ways and Means
72nd	Guillermo Linares	Democrat	
73rd	Jonathan Bing*	Democrat	in June 2011 appointed Commissioner of the NYS Liquidation Bureau
73rd	Dan Quart	Democrat	on September 13, 2011, elected to fill vacancy
74th	Brian P. Kavanagh*	Democrat	
75th	Richard N. Gottfried*	Democrat	
76th	Peter M. Rivera*	Democrat	on June 30, 2012, took office as NYS Labor Commissioner
77th	Vanessa Gibson*	Democrat	
78th	Jose Rivera*	Democrat	
79th	Eric Stevenson	Democrat	
80th	Naomi Rivera*	Democrat	
81st	Jeffrey Dinowitz*	Democrat	
82nd	Michael Benedetto*	Democrat	
83rd	Carl Heastie*	Democrat	
84th	Carmen E. Arroyo*	Democrat	
85th	Marcos Crespo*	Democrat	
86th	Nelson Castro*	Democrat	
87th	J. Gary Pretlow*	Democrat	
88th	Amy Paulin*	Democrat	
89th	Robert Castelli*	Republican	
90th	Sandy Galef*	Democrat	
91st	George Latimer*	Democrat	
92nd	Thomas J. Abinanti	Democrat	
93rd	Mike Spano*	Democrat	on November 8, 2011, elected Mayor of Yonkers
93rd	Shelley Mayer	Democrat	on March 20, 2012, elected to fill vacancy
94th	Kenneth Zebrowski Jr.*	Democrat	
95th	Ellen Jaffee*	Democrat	
96th	Nancy Calhoun*	Republican	
97th	Ann Rabbitt*	Republican	
98th	Aileen Gunther*	Democrat	
99th	Steve Katz	Republican	
100th	Thomas J. Kirwan	Republican	died on November 28, 2011
100th	Frank Skartados	Democrat	on March 20, 2012, elected to fill vacancy
101st	Kevin A. Cahill*	Democrat	
102nd	Joel M. Miller*	Republican	
103rd	Marcus Molinaro*	Republican	on November 8, 2011, elected Dutchess County Executive
103rd	Didi Barrett	Democrat	on March 20, 2012, elected to fill vacancy
104th	John McEneny*	Democrat	
105th	George A. Amedore Jr.*	Republican	
106th	Ronald Canestrari*	Democrat	Majority Leader
107th	Clifford Crouch*	Republican	
108th	Steven McLaughlin	Republican	
109th	Robert Reilly*	Democrat	
110th	Jim Tedisco*	Republican	
111th	Bill Magee*	Democrat	
112th	Tony Jordan*	Republican	
113th	Teresa Sayward*	Republican	
114th	Janet Duprey*	Republican	
115th	Claudia Tenney	Republican	
116th	RoAnn Destito*	Democrat	on May 10, 2011, confirmed as Commissioner of the NYS Office of General Services
116th	Anthony Brindisi	Democrat	on September 13, 2011, elected to fill vacancy
117th	Marc W. Butler*	Republican	
118th	Addie Jenne*	Democrat	
119th	Samuel D. Roberts	Democrat	
120th	William Magnarelli*	Democrat	
121st	Donald R. Miller	Republican	
122nd	Ken Blankenbush	Republican	
123rd	Gary Finch*	Republican	
124th	William Barclay*	Republican	
125th	Barbara Lifton*	Democrat	
126th	Donna Lupardo*	Democrat	
127th	Pete Lopez*	Republican	
128th	Bob Oaks*	Republican	
129th	Brian Kolb*	Republican	Minority Leader
130th	Sean Hanna	Republican	
131st	Harry Bronson	Democrat	
132nd	Joseph D. Morelle*	Democrat	
133rd	David Gantt*	Democrat	
134th	Bill Reilich*	Republican	
135th	Mark C. Johns	Republican	
136th	Phil Palmesano	Republican	
137th	Christopher S. Friend	Republican	
138th	John Ceretto	Republican	
139th	Stephen Hawley*	Republican	
140th	Robin Schimminger*	Democrat	
141st	Crystal Peoples*	Democrat	
142nd	Jane Corwin*	Republican	
143rd	Dennis Gabryszak*	Democrat	
144th	Sam Hoyt*	Democrat	on July 1, 2011, appointed as a Senior Vice President of the Empire State Development Corporation
144th	Sean Ryan	Democrat	on September 13, 2011, elected to fill vacancy
145th	Mark J. F. Schroeder*	Democrat	on November 8, 2011, elected Buffalo City Comptroller
145th	Michael P. Kearns	Ind. Dem.	on March 20, 2012, elected to fill vacancy
146th	Kevin Smardz	Republican	
147th	Daniel Burling*	Republican	
148th	James P. Hayes*	Republican	resigned effective September 6, 2011
148th	Raymond Walter	Republican	on November 8, 2011, elected to fill vacancy
149th	Joseph Giglio*	Republican	
150th	Andy Goodell	Republican	

=== Employees ===
- Clerk: ?

== Sources ==
- Senate election results at NYS Board of Elections
- Assembly election results at NYS Board of Elections
- September 13, 2011, special election results at NYS Board of Elections
