= New York's 150th State Assembly district =

American legislative district

Assemblymember
Andrew Molitor; R–Westfield

New York's 150th State Assembly district is one of the 150 districts in the New York State Assembly. It has been represented by Andrew Molitor since 2025. It was previously represented by Andy Goodell since 2011.

== Representatives ==
The following is a list of representatives of the 150th district.

Name	Party	Term Began	Term Ended	Legislature
Frank Walkley	Republican Party	January 1, 1966	December 31, 1966	176th
Jess J. Present	Republican Party	January 1, 1967	December 31, 1968	177th
John W. Beckman	Republican Party	January 1, 1969	December 31, 1974	178th
John W. Beckman	Republican Party	January 1, 1969	December 31, 1974	179th
John W. Beckman	Republican Party	January 1, 1969	December 31, 1974	180th
Rolland E. Kidder	Democratic Party	January 8, 1975	December 31, 1982	181st
Rolland E. Kidder	Democratic Party	January 8, 1975	December 31, 1982	182nd
Rolland E. Kidder	Democratic Party	January 8, 1975	December 31, 1982	183rd
Rolland E. Kidder	Democratic Party	January 8, 1975	December 31, 1982	184th
William Parment	Democratic Party	January 5, 1983	December 31, 2010	185th
William Parment	Democratic Party	January 5, 1983	December 31, 2010	186th
William Parment	Democratic Party	January 5, 1983	December 31, 2010	187th
William Parment	Democratic Party	January 5, 1983	December 31, 2010	188th
William Parment	Democratic Party	January 5, 1983	December 31, 2010	189th
William Parment	Democratic Party	January 5, 1983	December 31, 2010	190th
William Parment	Democratic Party	January 5, 1983	December 31, 2010	191st
William Parment	Democratic Party	January 5, 1983	December 31, 2010	192nd
William Parment	Democratic Party	January 5, 1983	December 31, 2010	193rd
William Parment	Democratic Party	January 5, 1983	December 31, 2010	194th
William Parment	Democratic Party	January 5, 1983	December 31, 2010	195th
William Parment	Democratic Party	January 5, 1983	December 31, 2010	196th
William Parment	Democratic Party	January 5, 1983	December 31, 2010	197th
William Parment	Democratic Party	January 5, 1983	December 31, 2010	198th
William Parment	Democratic Party	January 5, 1983	December 31, 2010	199th
William Parment	Democratic Party	January 5, 1983	December 31, 2010	198th
Andy Goodell	Republican Party	January 1, 2011	present	199th
Andy Goodell	Republican Party	January 1, 2011	present	200th
Andy Goodell	Republican Party	January 1, 2011	present	201st
Andy Goodell	Republican Party	January 1, 2011	present	202nd
Andy Goodell	Republican Party	January 1, 2011	present	203rd
Andy Goodell	Republican Party	January 1, 2011	present	204th
Andy Goodell	Republican Party	January 1, 2011	present	205th

Andrew Molitor

== Geography ==
=== 2020s ===
District 150 contains the entirety of Chautauqua County and the Cattaraugus Reservation in Erie County. The district is entirely within New York's 23rd congressional district and overlaps the 57th and 60th districts of the New York State Senate.

=== 2010s ===
District 150 contained only the entirety of Chautauqua County.

== Recent election results ==
=== 2024 ===
2024 New York State Assembly election, District 150
Party	Candidate	Votes	%
Republican	Andrew Molitor	29,783	
Conservative	Andrew Molitor	4,514	
Total	Andrew Molitor	34,297	62.8
Democratic	Mike Bobseine	18,436	
Working Families	Mike Bobseine	1,661	
Restore Freedom	Mike Bobseine	167	
Total	Mike Bobseine	20,264	37.1
Write-in		25	0.1
Total votes		54,586	100.0
Republican hold			

=== 2022 ===
2022 New York State Assembly election, District 150
Party	Candidate	Votes	%
Republican	Andy Goodell	26,786	
Conservative	Andy Goodell	4,207	
Total	Andy Goodell (incumbent)	30,993	72.2
Democratic	Sandra Lewis	11,908	27.8
Write-in		7	0.0
Total votes		42,908	100.0
Republican hold			

=== 2020 ===
2020 New York State Assembly election, District 150
Party	Candidate	Votes	%
Republican	Andy Goodell	33,746	
Conservative	Andy Goodell	4,441	
Independence	Andy Goodell	1,406	
Total	Andy Goodell (incumbent)	39,593	68.9
Democratic	Christina Cardinale	17,845	31.1
Write-in		20	0.0
Total votes		57,458	100.0
Republican hold			

=== 2018 ===
2018 New York State Assembly election, District 150
Party	Candidate	Votes	%
Republican	Andy Goodell	25,090	
Conservative	Andy Goodell	3,368	
Independence	Andy Goodell	1,363	
Total	Andy Goodell (incumbent)	29,821	68.7
Democratic	Judith Einach	12,608	
Working Families	Judith Einach	659	
Women's Equality	Judith Einach	344	
Total	Judith Einach	13,611	31.3
Write-in		15	0.0
Total votes		43,447	100.0
Republican hold			

=== 2016 ===
2016 New York State Assembly election, District 150
Primary election
Party	Candidate	Votes	%
Reform	Jason Purdue	13	76.5
Reform	Andy Goodell (incumbent)	4	23.5
Write-in		0	0.0
Total votes		17	100
General election
Republican	Andy Goodell	31,455	
Conservative	Andy Goodell	4,383	
Independence	Andy Goodell	2,434	
Total	Andy Goodell (incumbent)	38,272	74.1
Democratic	Jason Perdue	12,020	
Working Families	Jason Perdue	1,183	
Reform	Jason Perdue	194	
Total	Jason Perdue	13,397	25.9
Write-in		15	0.0
Total votes		51,688	100.0
Republican hold			

=== 2014 ===
2014 New York State Assembly election, District 150
Party	Candidate	Votes	%
Republican	Andy Goodell	19,987	
Conservative	Andy Goodell	3,345	
Independence	Andy Goodell	2,016	
Total	Andy Goodell (incumbent)	25,348	74.6
Democratic	Barrie Yochim	7,446	
Working Families	Barrie Yochim	1,176	
Total	Barrie Yochim	8,622	25.4
Write-in		11	0.0
Total votes		33,981	100.0
Republican hold			

=== 2012 ===
2012 New York State Assembly election, District 150
Party	Candidate	Votes	%
Republican	Andy Goodell	25,112	
Conservative	Andy Goodell	3,774	
Independence	Andy Goodell	2,285	
Total	Andy Goodell (incumbent)	31,171	61.3
Democratic	Rudy Mueller	17,486	
Working Families	Rudy Mueller	2,209	
Total	Rudy Mueller	19,695	38.7
Write-in		14	0.0
Total votes		50,880	100.0
Republican hold			

=== 2010 ===
2010 New York State Assembly election, District 150
Party	Candidate	Votes	%
Republican	Andy Goodell	16,498	
Conservative	Andy Goodell	2,375	
Change Albany	Andy Goodell	216	
Total	Andy Goodell	19,089	55.6
Democratic	Nancy Gay Bargar	15,193	44.2
Write-in		53	0.2
Total votes		34,335	100.0
Republican gain from Democratic			
