= 197th New York State Legislature =

New York state legislative session

←	196th	198th	→
- New York State Capitol (2009)

Overview
- Legislative body: New York State Legislature
- Jurisdiction: New York, United States
- Term: January 1, 2007 – December 31, 2008

Senate
- Members: 62
- President: Lt. Gov. David Paterson (D), until March 17, 2008
- Temporary President: Joseph Bruno (R), until June 24, 2008; Dean Skelos (R), from June 24, 2008
- Party control: Republican

Assembly
- Members: 150
- Speaker: Sheldon Silver (D)
- Party control: Democratic

Sessions
- 1st: January 3 – ?, 2007
- 2nd: January 9 – ?, 2008

The 197th New York State Legislature, consisting of the New York State Senate and the New York State Assembly, met from January 3, 2007, to December 31, 2008, during Eliot Spitzer's and the early part of David Paterson's governorship, in Albany.

== State Senate ==
=== Senators ===
The asterisk (*) denotes members of the previous Legislature who continued in office as members of this Legislature. Assemblyman Darrel Aubertine was elected to fill a vacancy in the Senate.

Note: For brevity, the chairmanships omit the words "...the Committee on (the)..."

District	Senator	Party	Notes
1st	Kenneth LaValle*	Republican	
2nd	John J. Flanagan*	Republican	
3rd	Caesar Trunzo*	Republican	
4th	Owen H. Johnson*	Republican	
5th	Carl L. Marcellino*	Republican	
6th	Kemp Hannon*	Republican	
7th	Michael Balboni*	Republican	on January 1, 2007, appointed NYS Deputy Secretary for Public Safety
7th	Craig M. Johnson	Democrat	on February 6, 2007, elected to fill vacancy
8th	Charles J. Fuschillo Jr.*	Republican	
9th	Dean Skelos*	Republican	Temporary President and Acting Lt. Gov. from June 24, 2008
10th	Shirley Huntley	Democrat	
11th	Frank Padavan*	Republican	
12th	George Onorato*	Democrat	
13th	John Sabini*	Democrat	in June 2008, appointed NYS Racing Commissioner
14th	Malcolm Smith*	Democrat	
15th	Serphin R. Maltese*	Cons./Rep.	
16th	Toby Ann Stavisky*	Democrat	
17th	Martin Malave Dilan*	Democrat	
18th	Velmanette Montgomery*	Democrat	
19th	John L. Sampson*	Democrat	
20th	Eric Adams	Democrat	
21st	Kevin Parker*	Democrat	
22nd	Martin Golden*	Republican	
23rd	Diane Savino*	Democrat	
24th	Andrew Lanza	Republican	
25th	Martin Connor*	Democrat	
26th	Liz Krueger*	Democrat	
27th	Carl Kruger*	Democrat	
28th	José M. Serrano*	Democrat	
29th	Thomas Duane*	Democrat	
30th	Bill Perkins	Democrat	
31st	Eric Schneiderman*	Democrat	
32nd	Rubén Díaz Sr.*	Democrat	
33rd	Efrain Gonzalez Jr.*	Democrat	
34th	Jeffrey D. Klein*	Democrat	
35th	Andrea Stewart-Cousins	Democrat	
36th	Ruth Hassell-Thompson*	Democrat	
37th	Suzi Oppenheimer*	Democrat	
38th	Thomas P. Morahan*	Republican	
39th	William J. Larkin Jr.*	Republican	
40th	Vincent Leibell*	Republican	
41st	Stephen M. Saland*	Republican	
42nd	John Bonacic*	Republican	
43rd	Joseph Bruno*	Republican	Temporary President until June 24, 2008; Acting Lt. Gov. from March 17 to June 24, 2008; resigned his seat on July 18, 2008
44th	Hugh T. Farley*	Republican	
45th	Betty Little*	Republican	
46th	Neil Breslin*	Democrat	
47th	Joseph Griffo	Republican	
48th	James W. Wright*	Republican	resigned effective December 31, 2007
48th	Darrel Aubertine*	Democrat	on February 26, 2008, elected to fill vacancy
49th	David J. Valesky*	Democrat	
50th	John A. DeFrancisco*	Republican	
51st	James L. Seward*	Republican	
52nd	Thomas W. Libous*	Republican	
53rd	George H. Winner Jr.*	Republican	
54th	Michael F. Nozzolio*	Republican	
55th	James S. Alesi*	Republican	
56th	Joseph Robach*	Republican	
57th	Catharine Young*	Republican	
58th	William Stachowski*	Democrat	
59th	Dale M. Volker*	Republican	
60th	Antoine Thompson	Democrat	
61st	Mary Lou Rath*	Republican	
62nd	George D. Maziarz*	Republican	

=== Employees ===
- Secretary: ?

== State Assembly ==
=== Assembly members ===
The asterisk (*) denotes members of the previous Legislature who continued in office as members of this Legislature.

Note: For brevity, the chairmanships omit the words "...the Committee on (the)..."

District	Assembly member	Party	Notes
1st	Marc Alessi*	Democrat	
2nd	Fred W. Thiele Jr.*	Republican	
3rd	Patricia Eddington*	Democrat	
4th	Steve Englebright*	Democrat	
5th	Ginny Fields*	Democrat	
6th	Philip Ramos*	Democrat	
7th	Michael J. Fitzpatrick*	Republican	
8th	Phil Boyle*	Republican	
9th	Andrew Raia*	Republican	
10th	James D. Conte*	Republican	
11th	Robert K. Sweeney*	Democrat	
12th	Joseph Saladino*	Republican	
13th	Charles D. Lavine*	Democrat	
14th	Robert Barra*	Republican	
15th	Rob Walker*	Republican	
16th	Thomas DiNapoli*	Democrat	on February 7, 2007, elected State Comptroller
16th	Michelle Schimel	Democrat	on March 27, 2007, elected to fill vacancy
17th	Thomas McKevitt*	Republican	
18th	Earlene Hill Hooper*	Democrat	
19th	David McDonough*	Republican	
20th	Harvey Weisenberg*	Democrat	
21st	Thomas Alfano*	Republican	
22nd	Ellen Young	Democrat	
23rd	Audrey Pheffer*	Democrat	
24th	Mark Weprin*	Democrat	
25th	Rory Lancman	Democrat	
26th	Ann-Margaret Carrozza*	Democrat	
27th	Nettie Mayersohn*	Democrat	
28th	Andrew Hevesi*	Democrat	
29th	William Scarborough*	Democrat	
30th	Margaret Markey*	Democrat	
31st	Michele Titus*	Democrat	
32nd	Vivian E. Cook*	Democrat	
33rd	Barbara M. Clark*	Democrat	
34th	Ivan C. Lafayette*	Democrat	
35th	Jeffrion L. Aubry*	Democrat	
36th	Michael Gianaris*	Democrat	
37th	Catherine Nolan*	Democrat	
38th	Anthony S. Seminerio*	Democrat	
39th	Jose Peralta*	Democrat	
40th	Diane Gordon*	Democrat	lost seat on April 8, 2008, upon conviction for bribery
41st	Helene Weinstein*	Democrat	
42nd	Rhoda S. Jacobs*	Democrat	
43rd	Karim Camara*	Democrat	
44th	James F. Brennan*	Democrat	
45th	Steven Cymbrowitz*	Democrat	
46th	Alec Brook-Krasny	Democrat	
47th	William Colton*	Democrat	
48th	Dov Hikind*	Democrat	
49th	Peter J. Abbate Jr.*	Democrat	
50th	Joseph R. Lentol*	Democrat	
51st	Félix W. Ortiz*	Democrat	
52nd	Joan Millman*	Democrat	
53rd	Vito J. Lopez*	Democrat	
54th	Darryl C. Towns*	Democrat	
55th	William Boyland Jr.*	Democrat	
56th	Annette Robinson*	Democrat	
57th	Hakeem Jeffries	Democrat	
58th	N. Nick Perry*	Democrat	
59th	Alan Maisel*	Democrat	
60th	Janele Hyer-Spencer	Democrat	
61st	John W. Lavelle*	Democrat	died on January 24, 2007
61st	Matthew Titone	Democrat	on March 27, 2007, elected to fill vacancy
62nd	Vincent M. Ignizio*	Republican	on February 20, 2007, elected to the New York City Council
62nd	Louis Tobacco	Republican	on March 27, 2007, elected to fill vacancy
63rd	Michael Cusick*	Democrat	
64th	Sheldon Silver*	Democrat	re-elected Speaker
65th	Pete Grannis*	Democrat	on April 1, 2007, confirmed as Commissioner of NYSDEC
65th	Micah Kellner	Democrat	on June 5, 2007, elected to fill vacancy
66th	Deborah J. Glick*	Democrat	
67th	Linda Rosenthal*	Democrat	
68th	Adam Clayton Powell IV*	Democrat	
69th	Daniel J. O'Donnell*	Democrat	
70th	Keith L. T. Wright*	Democrat	
71st	Herman D. Farrell Jr.*	Democrat	Chairman of Ways and Means
72nd	Adriano Espaillat*	Democrat	
73rd	Jonathan Bing*	Democrat	
74th	Brian P. Kavanagh	Democrat	
75th	Richard N. Gottfried*	Democrat	
76th	Peter M. Rivera*	Democrat	
77th	Aurelia Greene*	Democrat	
78th	Jose Rivera*	Democrat	
79th	Michael Benjamin*	Democrat	
80th	Naomi Rivera*	Democrat	
81st	Jeffrey Dinowitz*	Democrat	
82nd	Michael Benedetto*	Democrat	
83rd	Carl Heastie*	Democrat	
84th	Carmen E. Arroyo*	Democrat	
85th	Rubén Díaz Jr.*	Democrat	
86th	Luis Diaz*	Democrat	resigned in July 2008
87th	J. Gary Pretlow*	Democrat	
88th	Amy Paulin*	Democrat	
89th	Adam Bradley*	Democrat	
90th	Sandy Galef*	Democrat	
91st	George Latimer*	Democrat	
92nd	Richard L. Brodsky*	Democrat	
93rd	Mike Spano	Republican	
93rd	Mike Spano	Democrat	changed party affiliation in July 2007
94th	Kenneth Zebrowski*	Democrat	died on March 18, 2007
94th	Kenneth Zebrowski Jr.	Democrat	on May 1, 2007, elected to fill vacancy
95th	Ellen Jaffee	Democrat	
96th	Nancy Calhoun*	Republican	
97th	Ann Rabbitt*	Republican	
98th	Aileen Gunther*	Democrat	
99th	Greg Ball	Republican	
100th	Thomas J. Kirwan*	Republican	
101st	Kevin A. Cahill*	Democrat	
102nd	Joel M. Miller*	Republican	
103rd	Marcus Molinaro	Republican	
104th	John McEneny*	Democrat	
105th	Paul Tonko*	Democrat	on June 15, 2007, confirmed to head NYSERDA
105th	George A. Amedore Jr.	Republican	on July 21, 2007, elected to fill vacancy
106th	Ronald Canestrari*	Democrat	Majority Leader
107th	Clifford Crouch*	Republican	
108th	Timothy P. Gordon	Ind./Dem.	
109th	Robert Reilly*	Democrat	
110th	Jim Tedisco*	Republican	Minority Leader
111th	Bill Magee*	Democrat	
112th	Roy J. McDonald*	Republican	
113th	Teresa Sayward*	Republican	
114th	Janet Duprey	Republican	
115th	David R. Townsend Jr.*	Republican	
116th	RoAnn Destito*	Democrat	
117th	Marc W. Butler*	Republican	
118th	Darrel Aubertine*	Democrat	on February 26, 2008, elected to the State Senate
119th	Joan Christensen*	Democrat	
120th	William Magnarelli*	Democrat	
121st	Albert A. Stirpe Jr.	Democrat	
122nd	Dede Scozzafava*	Republican	
123rd	Gary Finch*	Republican	
124th	William Barclay*	Republican	
125th	Barbara Lifton*	Democrat	
126th	Donna Lupardo*	Democrat	
127th	Pete Lopez	Republican	
128th	Bob Oaks*	Republican	
129th	Brian Kolb*	Republican	
130th	Joseph Errigo*	Republican	
131st	Susan V. John*	Democrat	
132nd	Joseph D. Morelle*	Democrat	
133rd	David Gantt*	Democrat	
134th	Bill Reilich*	Republican	
135th	David Koon*	Democrat	
136th	James Bacalles*	Republican	
137th	Tom O'Mara*	Republican	
138th	Francine DelMonte*	Democrat	
139th	Stephen Hawley*	Republican	
140th	Robin Schimminger*	Democrat	
141st	Crystal Peoples*	Democrat	
142nd	Michael W. Cole*	Republican	in May 2007, censured by the Assembly
143rd	Dennis Gabryszak	Democrat	
144th	Sam Hoyt*	Democrat	
145th	Mark J. F. Schroeder*	Democrat	
146th	Jack Quinn III*	Republican	
147th	Daniel Burling*	Republican	
148th	James P. Hayes*	Republican	
149th	Joseph Giglio*	Republican	
150th	William L. Parment*	Democrat	

=== Employees ===
- Clerk: ?

== Sources ==
- Senate election results at NYS Board of Elections
- Assembly election results at NYS Board of Elections
