= 200th New York State Legislature =

New York state legislative session

←	199th	201st	→
- New York State Capitol (2009)

Overview
- Legislative body: New York State Legislature
- Jurisdiction: New York, United States
- Term: January 1, 2013 – December 31, 2014

Senate
- Members: 63
- President: Lt. Gov. Robert Duffy (D)
- Temporary President: Dean Skelos (R) / Jeffrey D. Klein (IDC)
- Party control: Republican/IDC

Assembly
- Members: 150
- Speaker: Sheldon Silver (D)
- Party control: Democratic

Sessions
- 1st: January 9 – ?, 2013
- 2nd: January 8 – ?, 2014

The 200th New York State Legislature, consisting of the New York State Senate and the New York State Assembly, met from January 9, 2013, to December 31, 2014, during the third and fourth years of Andrew Cuomo's governorship, in Albany

== Sessions ==
Governor Cuomo chose not to call any special elections for seats in the Legislature in 2014, so that for most of the year 11 seats in the Assembly and 2 seats in the Senate remained vacant.

== State Senate ==
=== Senators ===
The asterisk (*) denotes members of the previous Legislature who continued in office as members of this Legislature. Phil Boyle, George Latimer and George A. Amedore Jr. changed from the Assembly to the Senate.

Note: For brevity, the chairmanships omit the words "...the Committee on (the)..."

District	Senator	Party	Notes
1st	Kenneth LaValle*	Republican	
2nd	John J. Flanagan*	Republican	
3rd	Lee Zeldin*	Republican	on November 4, 2014, elected to the 114th U.S. Congress
4th	Phil Boyle*	Republican	
5th	Carl L. Marcellino*	Republican	
6th	Kemp Hannon*	Republican	
7th	Jack Martins*	Republican	
8th	Charles J. Fuschillo Jr.*	Republican	resigned effective December 31, 2013
8th	vacant		The seat remained vacant throughout 2014
9th	Dean Skelos*	Republican	co-Temporary President
10th	James Sanders Jr.	Democrat	
11th	Tony Avella*	Democrat	
11th	Tony Avella*	Dem. (IDC)	from February 2014
12th	Michael Gianaris*	Democrat	
13th	Jose Peralta*	Democrat	
14th	Malcolm Smith*	Democrat	member of IDC from January to April 2013
15th	Joseph Addabbo Jr.*	Democrat	
16th	Toby Ann Stavisky*	Democrat	
17th	Simcha Felder	Ind. Dem.	
18th	Martin Malave Dilan*	Democrat	
19th	John L. Sampson*	Democrat	
20th	Eric Adams*	Democrat	on November 5, 2013, elected Brooklyn Borough President
20th	vacant		The seat remained vacant throughout 2014
21st	Kevin Parker*	Democrat	
22nd	Martin Golden*	Republican	
23rd	Diane Savino*	Dem. (IDC)	
24th	Andrew Lanza*	Republican	
25th	Velmanette Montgomery*	Democrat	
26th	Daniel Squadron*	Democrat	
27th	Brad Hoylman	Democrat	
28th	Liz Krueger*	Democrat	
29th	José M. Serrano*	Democrat	
30th	Bill Perkins*	Democrat	
31st	Adriano Espaillat*	Democrat	
32nd	Rubén Díaz Sr.*	Democrat	
33rd	Gustavo Rivera*	Democrat	
34th	Jeffrey D. Klein*	Dem. (IDC)	co-Temporary President
35th	Andrea Stewart-Cousins*	Democrat	Minority Leader
36th	Ruth Hassell-Thompson*	Democrat	
37th	George Latimer*	Democrat	
38th	David Carlucci*	Dem. (IDC)	
39th	William J. Larkin Jr.*	Republican	
40th	Greg Ball*	Republican	
41st	Terry Gipson	Democrat	
42nd	John Bonacic*	Republican	
43rd	Kathy Marchione	Republican	
44th	Neil Breslin*	Democrat	
45th	Betty Little*	Republican	
46th	George A. Amedore Jr.*	Republican	seat contested
46th	Cecilia Tkaczyk	Democrat	seated on January 23, 2013
47th	Joseph Griffo*	Republican	
48th	Patty Ritchie*	Republican	
49th	Hugh T. Farley*	Republican	
50th	John A. DeFrancisco*	Republican	
51st	James L. Seward*	Republican	
52nd	Thomas W. Libous*	Republican	
53rd	David J. Valesky*	Dem. (IDC)	
54th	Michael F. Nozzolio*	Republican	
55th	Ted O'Brien	Democrat	
56th	Joseph Robach*	Republican	
57th	Catharine Young*	Republican	
58th	Tom O'Mara*	Republican	
59th	Patrick M. Gallivan*	Republican	
60th	Mark Grisanti*	Republican	
61st	Michael Ranzenhofer*	Republican	
62nd	George D. Maziarz*	Republican	
63rd	Timothy M. Kennedy*	Democrat	

=== Employees ===
- Secretary: ?

== State Assembly ==
=== Assembly members ===
The asterisk (*) denotes members of the previous Legislature who continued in office as members of this Legislature.

Note: For brevity, the chairmanships omit the words "...the Committee on (the)..."

District	Assembly member	Party	Notes
1st	Fred W. Thiele Jr.*	Ind./Dem.	
2nd	Daniel Losquadro*	Republican	in March 2013 elected Highway Superintendent of Brookhaven
2nd	Anthony Palumbo	Republican	on November 5, 2013, elected to fill vacancy
3rd	Edward J. Hennessey	Democrat	
4th	Steve Englebright*	Democrat	
5th	Al Graf*	Republican	
6th	Philip Ramos*	Democrat	
7th	Andrew Garbarino	Republican	
8th	Michael J. Fitzpatrick*	Republican	
9th	Joseph Saladino*	Republican	
10th	Chad Lupinacci	Republican	
11th	Robert K. Sweeney*	Democrat	
12th	Andrew Raia*	Republican	
13th	Charles D. Lavine*	Democrat	
14th	David McDonough*	Republican	
15th	Michael Montesano*	Republican	
16th	Michelle Schimel*	Democrat	
17th	Thomas McKevitt*	Republican	
18th	Earlene Hill Hooper*	Democrat	
19th	Ed Ra*	Republican	
20th	Harvey Weisenberg*	Democrat	
21st	Brian F. Curran*	Republican	
22nd	Michaelle C. Solages	Democrat	
23rd	Phil Goldfeder*	Democrat	
24th	David Weprin*	Democrat	
25th	Nily Rozic	Democrat	
26th	Edward Braunstein*	Democrat	
27th	Michael Simanowitz*	Democrat	
28th	Andrew Hevesi*	Democrat	
29th	William Scarborough*	Democrat	
30th	Margaret Markey*	Democrat	
31st	Michele Titus*	Democrat	
32nd	Vivian E. Cook*	Democrat	
33rd	Barbara M. Clark*	Democrat	
34th	Michael DenDekker*	Democrat	
35th	Jeffrion L. Aubry*	Democrat	
36th	Aravella Simotas*	Democrat	
37th	Catherine Nolan*	Democrat	
38th	Michael G. Miller*	Democrat	
39th	Francisco Moya*	Democrat	
40th	Ron Kim	Democrat	
41st	Helene Weinstein*	Democrat	
42nd	Rhoda S. Jacobs*	Democrat	
43rd	Karim Camara*	Democrat	
44th	James F. Brennan*	Democrat	
45th	Steven Cymbrowitz*	Democrat	
46th	Alec Brook-Krasny*	Democrat	
47th	William Colton*	Democrat	
48th	Dov Hikind*	Democrat	
49th	Peter J. Abbate Jr.*	Democrat	
50th	Joseph R. Lentol*	Democrat	
51st	Félix W. Ortiz*	Democrat	
52nd	Joan Millman*	Democrat	
53rd	Vito J. Lopez*	Democrat	resigned on May 20, 2013
53rd	Maritza Davila	Democrat	on November 5, 2013, elected to fill vacancy
54th	Rafael Espinal*	Democrat	on November 5, 2013, elected to the New York City Council
54th	vacant		The seat remained vacant throughout 2014
55th	William Boyland Jr.*	Democrat	seat vacated on March 6, 2014; seat vacant until the end of 2014
56th	Annette Robinson*	Democrat	
57th	Walter T. Mosley	Democrat	
58th	N. Nick Perry*	Democrat	
59th	Alan Maisel*	Democrat	on November 5, 2013, elected to the New York City Council
59th	vacant		The seat remained vacant throughout 2014
60th	Inez Barron*	Democrat	on November 5, 2013, elected to the New York City Council
60th	vacant		The seat remained vacant throughout 2014
61st	Matthew Titone*	Democrat	
62nd	Joe Borelli	Republican	
63rd	Michael Cusick*	Democrat	
64th	Nicole Malliotakis*	Republican	
65th	Sheldon Silver*	Democrat	re-elected Speaker
66th	Deborah J. Glick*	Democrat	
67th	Linda Rosenthal*	Democrat	
68th	Robert J. Rodriguez*	Democrat	
69th	Daniel J. O'Donnell*	Democrat	
70th	Keith L. T. Wright*	Democrat	
71st	Herman D. Farrell Jr.*	Democrat	Chairman of Ways and Means
72nd	Gabriela Rosa	Democrat	resigned in June 2014; seat vacant until the end of 2014
73rd	Dan Quart*	Democrat	
74th	Brian P. Kavanagh*	Democrat	
75th	Richard N. Gottfried*	Democrat	
76th	Micah Kellner*	Democrat	
77th	Vanessa Gibson*	Democrat	on November 5, 2013, elected to the New York City Council
77th	vacant		The seat remained vacant throughout 2014
78th	Jose Rivera*	Democrat	
79th	Eric Stevenson*	Democrat	seat vacated on January 13, 2014; seat vacant until the end of 2014
80th	Mark Gjonaj	Democrat	
81st	Jeffrey Dinowitz*	Democrat	
82nd	Michael Benedetto*	Democrat	
83rd	Carl Heastie*	Democrat	
84th	Carmen E. Arroyo*	Democrat	
85th	Marcos Crespo*	Democrat	
86th	Nelson Castro*	Democrat	resigned in April 2013
86th	Victor M. Pichardo	Democrat	on November 5, 2013, elected to fill vacancy
87th	Luis R. Sepúlveda	Democrat	
88th	Amy Paulin*	Democrat	
89th	J. Gary Pretlow*	Democrat	
90th	Shelley Mayer*	Democrat	
91st	Steven Otis	Democrat	
92nd	Thomas J. Abinanti*	Democrat	
93rd	David Buchwald	Democrat	
94th	Steve Katz*	Republican	
95th	Sandy Galef*	Democrat	
96th	Kenneth Zebrowski Jr.*	Democrat	
97th	Ellen Jaffee*	Democrat	
98th	Ann Rabbitt*	Republican	on November 5, 2013, elected County Clerk of Orange Co.
98th	vacant		The seat remained vacant throughout 2014
99th	James Skoufis	Democrat	
100th	Aileen Gunther*	Democrat	
101st	Claudia Tenney*	Republican	
102nd	Pete Lopez*	Republican	
103rd	Kevin A. Cahill*	Democrat	
104th	Frank Skartados*	Democrat	
105th	Kieran Lalor	Republican	
106th	Didi Barrett*	Democrat	
107th	Steven McLaughlin*	Republican	
108th	John T. McDonald III	Democrat	
109th	Patricia Fahy	Democrat	
110th	Phillip Steck	Democrat	
111th	Angelo Santabarbara	Democrat	
112th	Jim Tedisco*	Republican	
113th	Tony Jordan*	Republican	on November 5, 2013, elected D.A. of Washington Co.
113th	vacant		The seat remained vacant throughout 2014
114th	Dan Stec	Republican	
115th	Janet Duprey*	Republican	
116th	Addie Jenne*	Democrat	
117th	Ken Blankenbush*	Republican	
118th	Marc W. Butler*	Republican	
119th	Anthony Brindisi*	Democrat	
120th	William Barclay*	Republican	
121st	Bill Magee*	Democrat	
122nd	Clifford Crouch*	Republican	
123rd	Donna Lupardo*	Democrat	
124th	Christopher S. Friend*	Republican	
125th	Barbara Lifton*	Democrat	
126th	Gary Finch*	Republican	
127th	Albert A. Stirpe Jr.	Democrat	
128th	Samuel D. Roberts*	Democrat	
129th	William Magnarelli*	Democrat	
130th	Bob Oaks*	Republican	
131st	Brian Kolb*	Republican	Minority Leader
132nd	Phil Palmesano*	Republican	
133rd	Bill Nojay	Republican	
134th	Bill Reilich*	Republican	on November 5, 2013, elected Supervisor of the Town of Greece
134th	vacant		The seat remained vacant throughout 2014
135th	Mark C. Johns*	Republican	
136th	Joseph D. Morelle*	Democrat	Majority Leader
137th	David F. Gantt*	Democrat	
138th	Harry Bronson*	Democrat	
139th	Stephen Hawley*	Republican	
140th	Robin Schimminger*	Democrat	
141st	Crystal Peoples*	Democrat	
142nd	Michael P. Kearns*	Democrat	
143rd	Dennis Gabryszak*	Democrat	resigned on January 12, 2014; seat vacant until the end of 2014
144th	Jane Corwin*	Republican	
145th	John Ceretto*	Republican	
146th	Raymond Walter*	Republican	
147th	David DiPietro	Republican	
148th	Joseph Giglio*	Republican	
149th	Sean Ryan	Democrat	
150th	Andy Goodell*	Republican	

=== Employees ===
- Clerk: ?

== Sources ==
- Senate election results at NYS Board of Elections
- Assembly election results at NYS Board of Elections
- Assembly special election results at NYS Board of Elections
