= 201st New York State Legislature =

New York state legislative session

←	200th	202nd	→
- New York State Capitol (2009)

Overview
- Legislative body: New York State Legislature
- Jurisdiction: New York, United States
- Term: January 1, 2015 – December 31, 2016

Senate
- President: Lt. Gov. Kathy Hochul (D)
- Temporary President: Dean Skelos (R), until May 11, 2015; John J. Flanagan (R), from May 11, 2015
- Party control: Republican/IDC

Assembly
- Speaker: Sheldon Silver (D), until February 2, 2015; Joseph D. Morelle (D), acting February 2–3, 2015; Carl Heastie (D), from February 3, 2015
- Party control: Democratic

Sessions
- 1: January 7 – ?, 2015
- 2: January 6 – ?, 2016

The 201st New York State Legislature, consisting of the New York State Senate and the New York State Assembly, met from January 7, 2015, to December 31, 2016, during the fifth and sixth years of Andrew Cuomo's governorship, in Albany.

== State Senate ==
=== Senators ===
The asterisk (*) denotes members of the previous Legislature who continued in office as members of this Legislature. Assembly members Roxanne Persaud and Todd Kaminsky were elected to fill vacancies in the Senate.

Note: For brevity, the chairmanships omit the words "...the Committee on (the)..."

District	Senator	Party	Notes
1st	Kenneth LaValle*	Republican	
2nd	John J. Flanagan*	Republican	Temporary President from May 11, 2015
3rd	Thomas Croci	Republican	
4th	Phil Boyle*	Republican	
5th	Carl L. Marcellino*	Republican	
6th	Kemp Hannon*	Republican	
7th	Jack Martins*	Republican	
8th	Michael Venditto	Republican	
9th	Dean Skelos*	Republican	Temporary President until May 11, 2015; seat vacated on December 11, 2015
9th	Todd Kaminsky*	Democrat	on April 19, 2016, elected to fill vacancy
10th	James Sanders Jr.*	Democrat	
11th	Tony Avella*	Dem. (IDC)	
12th	Michael Gianaris*	Democrat	
13th	Jose Peralta*	Democrat	
14th	Leroy Comrie	Democrat	
15th	Joseph Addabbo Jr.*	Democrat	
16th	Toby Ann Stavisky*	Democrat	
17th	Simcha Felder*	Ind. Dem.	
18th	Martin Malave Dilan*	Democrat	
19th	John L. Sampson*	Democrat	seat vacated on July 24, 2015
19th	Roxanne Persaud*	Democrat	on November 3, 2015, elected to fill vacancy
20th	Jesse Hamilton	Democrat	
21st	Kevin Parker*	Democrat	
22nd	Martin Golden*	Republican	
23rd	Diane Savino*	Dem. (IDC)	
24th	Andrew Lanza*	Republican	
25th	Velmanette Montgomery*	Democrat	
26th	Daniel Squadron*	Democrat	
27th	Brad Hoylman*	Democrat	
28th	Liz Krueger*	Democrat	
29th	José M. Serrano*	Democrat	
30th	Bill Perkins*	Democrat	
31st	Adriano Espaillat*	Democrat	on November 8, 2016, elected to the 115th U.S. Congress
32nd	Rubén Díaz Sr.*	Democrat	
33rd	Gustavo Rivera*	Democrat	
34th	Jeffrey D. Klein*	Dem. (IDC)	IDC Leader
35th	Andrea Stewart-Cousins*	Democrat	Minority Leader
36th	Ruth Hassell-Thompson*	Democrat	appointed as Special Advisor for Policy and Community Affairs of NYS Homes and Community Renewal, beginning in July 2016
37th	George Latimer*	Democrat	
38th	David Carlucci*	Dem. (IDC)	
39th	William J. Larkin Jr.*	Republican	
40th	Terrence Murphy	Republican	
41st	Sue Serino	Republican	
42nd	John Bonacic*	Republican	
43rd	Kathy Marchione*	Republican	
44th	Neil Breslin*	Democrat	
45th	Betty Little*	Republican	
46th	George A. Amedore Jr.	Republican	
47th	Joseph Griffo*	Republican	
48th	Patty Ritchie*	Republican	
49th	Hugh T. Farley*	Republican	
50th	John A. DeFrancisco*	Republican	
51st	James L. Seward*	Republican	
52nd	Thomas W. Libous*	Republican	seat vacated on July 22, 2015
52nd	Fred Akshar	Republican	on November 3, 2015, elected to fill vacancy
53rd	David J. Valesky*	Dem. (IDC)	
54th	Michael F. Nozzolio*	Republican	
55th	Rich Funke	Republican	
56th	Joseph Robach*	Republican	
57th	Catharine Young*	Republican	
58th	Tom O'Mara*	Republican	
59th	Patrick M. Gallivan*	Republican	
60th	Marc Panepinto	Democrat	
61st	Michael Ranzenhofer*	Republican	
62nd	Robert Ortt	Republican	
63rd	Timothy M. Kennedy*	Democrat	

=== Employees ===
- Secretary: ?

== State Assembly ==
=== Assembly members ===
The asterisk (*) denotes members of the previous Legislature who continued in office as members of this Legislature.

Note: For brevity, the chairmanships omit the words "...the Committee on (the)..."

District	Assembly member	Party	Notes
1st	Fred W. Thiele Jr.*	Ind./Dem.	
2nd	Anthony Palumbo*	Republican	
3rd	L. Dean Murray	Republican	
4th	Steve Englebright*	Democrat	
5th	Al Graf*	Republican	
6th	Philip Ramos*	Democrat	
7th	Andrew Garbarino*	Republican	
8th	Michael J. Fitzpatrick*	Republican	
9th	Joseph Saladino*	Republican	
10th	Chad Lupinacci*	Republican	
11th	Kimberly Jean-Pierre	Democrat	
12th	Andrew Raia*	Republican	
13th	Charles D. Lavine*	Democrat	
14th	David McDonough*	Republican	
15th	Michael Montesano*	Republican	
16th	Michelle Schimel*	Democrat	
17th	Thomas McKevitt*	Republican	
18th	Earlene Hill Hooper*	Democrat	
19th	Ed Ra*	Republican	
20th	Todd Kaminsky	Democrat	on April 19, 2016, elected to the State Senate
21st	Brian F. Curran*	Republican	
22nd	Michaelle C. Solages*	Democrat	
23rd	Phil Goldfeder*	Democrat	resigned on November 8, 2016
24th	David Weprin*	Democrat	
25th	Nily Rozic*	Democrat	
26th	Edward Braunstein*	Democrat	
27th	Michael Simanowitz*	Democrat	
28th	Andrew Hevesi*	Democrat	
29th	William Scarborough*	Democrat	resigned on May 7, 2015
29th	Alicia Hyndman	Democrat	on November 3, 2015, elected to fill vacancy
30th	Margaret Markey*	Democrat	
31st	Michele Titus*	Democrat	
32nd	Vivian E. Cook*	Democrat	
33rd	Barbara M. Clark*	Democrat	died on February 22, 2016
34th	Michael DenDekker*	Democrat	
35th	Jeffrion L. Aubry*	Democrat	
36th	Aravella Simotas*	Democrat	
37th	Catherine Nolan*	Democrat	
38th	Michael G. Miller*	Democrat	
39th	Francisco Moya*	Democrat	
40th	Ron Kim*	Democrat	
41st	Helene Weinstein*	Democrat	
42nd	Rodneyse Bichotte	Democrat	
43rd	Karim Camara*	Democrat	resigned on February 20, 2015, to head the NYS OFBCD
43rd	Diana Richardson	Working Fam.	on May 5, 2015, elected to fill vacancy
44th	James F. Brennan*	Democrat	
45th	Steven Cymbrowitz*	Democrat	
46th	Alec Brook-Krasny*	Democrat	resigned effective July 7, 2015
46th	Pamela Harris	Democrat	on November 3, 2015, elected to fill vacancy
47th	William Colton*	Democrat	
48th	Dov Hikind*	Democrat	
49th	Peter J. Abbate Jr.*	Democrat	
50th	Joseph R. Lentol*	Democrat	
51st	Félix W. Ortiz*	Democrat	
52nd	Jo Anne Simon	Democrat	
53rd	Maritza Davila*	Democrat	
54th	Erik Martin Dilan	Democrat	
55th	Latrice Walker	Democrat	
56th	Annette Robinson*	Democrat	
57th	Walter T. Mosley*	Democrat	
58th	N. Nick Perry*	Democrat	
59th	Roxanne Persaud	Democrat	on November 3, 2015, elected to the State Senate
59th	Jaime Williams	Democrat	on April 19, 2016, elected to fill vacancy
60th	Charles Barron	Democrat	
61st	Matthew Titone*	Democrat	
62nd	Joe Borelli*	Republican	on November 3, 2015, elected to the New York City Council
62nd	Ronald Castorina	Republican	on April 19, 2016, elected to fill vacancy
63rd	Michael Cusick*	Democrat	
64th	Nicole Malliotakis*	Republican	
65th	Sheldon Silver*	Democrat	Speaker until February 2, 2015; seat vacated on November 30, 2015
65th	Alice Cancel	Democrat	on April 19, 2016, elected to fill vacancy
66th	Deborah J. Glick*	Democrat	
67th	Linda Rosenthal*	Democrat	
68th	Robert J. Rodriguez*	Democrat	
69th	Daniel J. O'Donnell*	Democrat	
70th	Keith L. T. Wright*	Democrat	
71st	Herman D. Farrell Jr.*	Democrat	Chairman of Ways and Means
72nd	Guillermo Linares	Democrat	
73rd	Dan Quart*	Democrat	
74th	Brian P. Kavanagh*	Democrat	
75th	Richard N. Gottfried*	Democrat	
76th	Rebecca Seawright	Democrat	
77th	Latoya Joyner	Democrat	
78th	Jose Rivera*	Democrat	
79th	Michael Blake	Democrat	
80th	Mark Gjonaj*	Democrat	
81st	Jeffrey Dinowitz*	Democrat	
82nd	Michael Benedetto*	Democrat	
83rd	Carl Heastie*	Democrat	Speaker from February 3, 2015
84th	Carmen E. Arroyo*	Democrat	
85th	Marcos Crespo*	Democrat	
86th	Victor M. Pichardo*	Democrat	
87th	Luis R. Sepúlveda*	Democrat	
88th	Amy Paulin*	Democrat	
89th	J. Gary Pretlow*	Democrat	
90th	Shelley Mayer*	Democrat	
91st	Steven Otis*	Democrat	
92nd	Thomas J. Abinanti*	Democrat	
93rd	David Buchwald*	Democrat	
94th	Steve Katz*	Republican	
95th	Sandy Galef*	Democrat	
96th	Kenneth Zebrowski Jr.*	Democrat	
97th	Ellen Jaffee*	Democrat	
98th	Karl A. Brabenec	Republican	
99th	James Skoufis*	Democrat	
100th	Aileen Gunther*	Democrat	
101st	Claudia Tenney*	Republican	on November 8, 2016, elected to the 115th U.S. Congress
102nd	Pete Lopez*	Republican	
103rd	Kevin A. Cahill*	Democrat	
104th	Frank Skartados*	Democrat	
105th	Kieran Lalor*	Republican	
106th	Didi Barrett*	Democrat	
107th	Steven McLaughlin*	Republican	
108th	John T. McDonald III*	Democrat	
109th	Patricia Fahy*	Democrat	
110th	Phillip Steck*	Democrat	
111th	Angelo Santabarbara*	Democrat	
112th	Jim Tedisco*	Republican	
113th	Carrie Woerner	Democrat	
114th	Dan Stec*	Republican	
115th	Janet Duprey*	Republican	
116th	Addie Jenne*	Democrat	
117th	Ken Blankenbush*	Republican	
118th	Marc W. Butler*	Republican	
119th	Anthony Brindisi*	Democrat	
120th	William Barclay*	Republican	
121st	Bill Magee*	Democrat	
122nd	Clifford Crouch*	Republican	
123rd	Donna Lupardo*	Democrat	
124th	Christopher S. Friend*	Republican	
125th	Barbara Lifton*	Democrat	
126th	Gary Finch*	Republican	
127th	Albert A. Stirpe Jr.*	Democrat	
128th	Samuel D. Roberts*	Democrat	in May 2015, appointed as Commissioner of NYS OTDA
128th	Pamela Hunter	Democrat	on November 3, 2015, elected to fill vacancy
129th	William Magnarelli*	Democrat	
130th	Bob Oaks*	Republican	
131st	Brian Kolb*	Republican	Minority Leader
132nd	Phil Palmesano*	Republican	
133rd	Bill Nojay*	Republican	died on September 9, 2016
134th	Peter Lawrence	Republican	
135th	Mark C. Johns*	Republican	
136th	Joseph D. Morelle*	Democrat	Majority Leader; Acting Speaker from February 2 to 3, 2015
137th	David F. Gantt*	Democrat	
138th	Harry Bronson*	Democrat	
139th	Stephen Hawley*	Republican	
140th	Robin Schimminger*	Democrat	
141st	Crystal Peoples*	Democrat	
142nd	Michael P. Kearns*	Democrat	
143rd	Angela Wozniak	Cons./Rep.	
144th	Jane Corwin*	Republican	
145th	John Ceretto*	Republican	changed party affiliation on August 18, 2015
145th	John Ceretto*	Democrat	changed party affiliation on August 18, 2015
146th	Raymond Walter*	Republican	
147th	David DiPietro*	Republican	
148th	Joseph Giglio*	Republican	
149th	Sean Ryan*	Democrat	
150th	Andy Goodell*	Republican	

=== Employees ===
- Secretary: ?

== Sources ==
- Senate election results at NYS Board of Elections
- Assembly election results at NYS Board of Elections
- 19th and 52nd Senate D. special election results at NYS Board of Elections
- 29th, 46th and 128th Assembly D. special election results at NYS Board of Elections
