= Vincent Leibell =

American politician

Vincent L. Leibell III

Member of the New York State Senate
- In office January 1, 1995 – December 31, 2010
- Preceded by: George Pataki
- Succeeded by: Greg Ball
- Constituency: 37th district (1995-2002); 40th district (2003-2010)

Member of the New York State Assembly
- In office January 1, 1983 – December 31, 1994
- Preceded by: Willis H. Stephens (redistricting)
- Succeeded by: Willis Stephens Jr.
- Constituency: 90th district (1983-1992); 91st district (1993-1994)

Personal details
- Born: August 6, 1946 (age 80) New York, New York
- Party: Republican
- Education: St. John's University (B.A.); New York University (M.P.A.)

Vincent L. Leibell III (born August 6, 1946) is a former American politician from Putnam County, New York. After a long career in the New York State Legislature, Leibell ran for and was elected county executive in 2010, but resigned prior to taking office following an investigation by the Federal Bureau of Investigation which led to his arrest and subsequent conviction on federal corruption charges.

His resignation was in connection with a Federal plea arrangement stemming from two felony convictions relating to kickbacks Leibell had received while using his position as State Senator to steer taxpayer monies towards two local non-profit agencies which he controlled. In November 2012, he was released to a halfway house after completed serving 17-months of his 21-month prison sentence at the Federal Correctional Institute in Loretto, Pennsylvania.

== Early life and background ==
Leibell was born in New York City. His grandfather and namesake was a federal judge, Vincent L. Leibell.

Leibell worked as an Assistant District Attorney in the Westchester County District Attorney's office. He was a Captain in the United States Navy and a Rear Admiral in the New York Naval Militia.

== Family ==
He is married, with three children. He received his BA and JD from Saint John's University, as well as an MPA from New York University. Because he was convicted of two felony counts of corruption in 2010, Leibell was forced to forfeit his law license. According to the Daily News, Leibell pleaded guilty to two charges to end a Federal investigation of him.

== Political career ==
Leibell entered politics as a Republican. He was a member of the New York State Assembly from 1983 to 1994, sitting in the 185th, 186th, 187th, 188th, 189th, 190th. In November 1994, he was elected to the State Senate, defeating Ex-Lieutenant Governor Alfred DelBello.

Leibell was a member of the New York State Senate from 1995 to 2010, sitting in the 191st, 192nd, 193rd, 194th, 195th, 196th, 197th and 198th New York State Legislatures. In November 2010, he was elected Putnam County Executive. Over the years, he attracted controversy for his reputation for patronage and as a political kingmaker in Putnam County - the local newspaper cited the rumor that his preferred method of handling political opposition was to "kill them in the cradle."

Although he had a twenty-eight year career in the State Legislature, Leibell was not particularly known for his legislative accomplishments and passed no significant legislation with his name attached to it, yet Leibell's largesse with so-called pork barrel spending and ability to "bring home the bacon" earned him the moniker "Uncle Vinnie".

Even after being convicted of two felonies, Leibell attracted further scandal when it was revealed he used campaign funds to spend $931 on new tires and $267 in Barnes and Nobles visits days after pleading guilty on Federal corruption charges. The government watchdog group Citizens Union called Leibell's actions part of a "legislative crime wave" in New York State, and named Leibell one of 17 legislators who lost their seat due to criminal issues from 2004 to 2010.

== FBI investigation, conviction ==
On June 26, 2010, the Journal News reported that FBI subpoenaed records for the home that Leibell built in Patterson, New York. On December 6, 2010, Leibell pleaded guilty to felony bribery, tax evasion, and obstruction of justice charges related to $43,000 in cash kickbacks he took from 2003 to 2006. Leibell had resigned from the State Senate on December 2, 2010, just prior to being arrested, which controversially due to a loophole in the New York State pension system allows him to keep a $71,000 pension despite his conviction.

The charges stated Leibell doled out $6.5 million in taxpayer funded "member items" to nonprofit groups he controlled from 2005 to 2010, according to records maintained by the Empire Center for New York State Policy and the Albany Project. He was sentenced to twenty one months in Federal Prison, after a Federal Judge rejected a plea by Leibell's lawyer to have the former Senator sent overseas to do "nation building work" in the Middle East instead of jailtime, a suggestion which outraged the media and local residents whom Leibell had betrayed by his actions.

The Leibell property in Patterson, New York formerly belonged to the late actress Elizabeth Montgomery, who employed Leibell's law firm to attend to certain legal matters. Leibell later purchased a portion of the property after the settlement of the Montgomery estate. Through use of Leibell's Senate position, the rest of the land became Wonder Lake State Park, which, from its founding in 1998 until 2006, had no discernible public access points.

Critics called Wonder Lake a personal park for the Senator, but Lebeill tried to assert it was used by hikers, though the park was shuttered nonetheless by the State amidst the 2010 New York State budget crisis. Leibell also used $230,000 in taxpayer dollars to construct a wooden footbridge on Route 311 in Patterson which critics derided as a "bridge to nowhere." Ironically, Leibell had moved to the home from Tammany Hall Road, named after the corrupt political machine run by Boss Tweed in mid-19th century New York.

"Leibell has only himself to blame for the fact that, after 28 years in public office, this conviction will be the capstone to that career," said Preet Bharara, the United States attorney for Manhattan who announced Leibell's guilty plea. Bharara explained that the FBI recorded Leibell threatening not to pay invoices sent to Leibell's 501(c)(3) nonprofit by an unnamed attorney unless the attorney paid half of the invoice amount back to Leibell in cash.

New York State Assembly
Preceded by Gordon W. Burrows	New York State Assembly; 90th District; 1983–1992	Succeeded by Sandy Galef
Preceded by George E. Pataki	New York State Assembly; 91st District; 1993–1994	Succeeded by Willis Stephens
New York State Senate
Preceded by George E. Pataki	New York State Senate; 37th District; 1995–2002	Succeeded by Suzi Oppenheimer
Preceded by John Bonacic	New York State Senate; 40th District; 2003–2010	Succeeded by Greg Ball
