= Suzi Oppenheimer =

American politician (born 1934)

Member of the New York State Senate
- In office January 1, 1985 – December 31, 2012
- Preceded by: Joseph R. Pisani
- Succeeded by: George Latimer
- Constituency: 36th district (1985-2002); 37th district (2003-2012)

Mayor of Mamaroneck
- In office January 1, 1977 – December 31, 1984
- Preceded by: Arthur C. Phillips
- Succeeded by: Robert Funicello (acting)

Personal details
- Born: Suzanne Oppenheimer; December 13, 1934 (age 91) New York City, New York, U.S.
- Party: Democratic
- Spouse(s): Martin J. Oppenheimer; 4 children
- Education: Connecticut College (BA); Columbia University (MA)
- Occupation: Legislator

Suzanne "Suzi" Oppenheimer (born December 13, 1934) is an American politician from New York who served from 1985 to 2012 in the New York State Senate.

== Early life and education ==
Oppenheimer was born as Suzanne Rosenhirsch on December 13, 1934, in New York City to Blanche Muriel (née Schoen) and Alfred Elihu Rosenhirsch.

She attended The Calhoun School in Manhattan, and graduated in 1952. She graduated in 1956 B.A. in economics from the Connecticut College for Women, and later earned a master's degree from Columbia University's Graduate School of Business. After receiving her degree, she worked on Wall Street as an industry analyst for L.F. Rothschild.

== Career ==
She entered politics as a Democrat, and was President of the Mamaroneck League of Women Voters, and President of the PTA of the Central School in Mamaroneck. She served four terms as Mayor of the Village of Mamaroneck, as well as President of the Westchester Municipal Officials Association and President of the Westchester Municipal Planning Federation.

She was a member of the New York State Senate from 1985 to 2012, sitting in the 186th, 187th, 188th, 189th, 190th, 191st, 192nd, 193rd, 194th, 195th, 196th, 197th, 198th and 199th New York State Legislatures. Her district was numbered the 36th from January 1985 to 2002, and the 37th from 2003 to 2012. The district comprised a part of Westchester County.

She was a pivotal political supporter of the efforts of the Jay Coalition (today's non-profit Jay Heritage Center) to preserve the historic Jay Estate in Rye.

On Monday, December 6, 2010, Bob Cohen conceded to Oppenheimer after a lengthy ballot recount. She retired in 2012.

== Awards and board memberships ==
In 2018, Oppenheimer received an award from the UJA-Federation of New York given to her for her leadership and dedication to the community. She and her husband sit on UJA-Federation’s Commission on the Jewish People Task Force.

== Personal life ==
In 1960, she married Martin J. Oppenheimer, a partner in the law firm Proskauer Rose. They have four children and eight grandchildren.

New York State Senate
Preceded by Joseph R. Pisani	New York State Senate; 36th District; 1985–2002	Succeeded by Ruth Hassell-Thompson
Preceded by Vincent Leibell	New York State Senate; 37th District; 2003–2012	Succeeded by George Latimer
Political offices
Preceded by Stephen M. Saland	New York State Senate; Chairwoman of the Committee on Education; 2009–2010	Succeeded by John J. Flanagan
