= Andrew Molitor =

American politician

Member of the New York State Assembly from the 150th district
- Incumbent
- Assumed office January 1, 2025
- Preceded by: Andy Goodell

Personal details
- Party: Republican
- Website: Campaign website Official website

Andrew Molitor is an American politician who is a member of the New York State Assembly for the 150th district, which comprises Chautauqua County and a portion of Erie County.

Molitor was previously a prosecutor and Chautauqua County's first assistant district attorney.

He announced his state Assembly run after Andrew Goodell announced his retirement. With 59.7% of the vote, Molitor defeated Democratic opponent Michael Bobseine, who received 34.9% of the vote. On assuming office, he continued to use Goodell's staff and offices.

Molitor describes the end of "catch and release" policing policies as his priority, claiming that drug dealers are immediately released and able to continue causing overdoses. He also opposes sanctuary state policies. Molitor opposes state bans on natural gas appliances. He supports funding for schools and lower taxes.

Molitor lives in Westfield, New York.
