= Eileen Hickey (New York politician) =

American politician (1945–1999)

Member of the New York State Assembly from the 97th district
- In office January 1, 1993 – December 31, 1994
- Preceded by: Donald H. McMillen
- Succeeded by: Joel M. Miller

Personal details
- Born: Eileen McKenna; July 7, 1945 Poughkeepsie, New York, U.S.
- Died: March 5, 1999 (aged 53)
- Resting place: Saint Peter Cemetery, Poughkeepsie, New York, U.S.
- Party: Democratic
- Spouse: Daniel G. Hickey (m. 1966)
- Children: 1
- Parent(s): Peter McKenna; Ruth Mollica
- Education: Our Lady of Lourdes High School; Marist College (BA)
- Profession: Politician

Eileen Hickey (July 7, 1945 – March 5, 1999) was an American politician from New York.

== Life ==
She was born Eileen McKenna on July 7, 1945, in Poughkeepsie, Dutchess County, New York, the daughter of Peter McKenna and Ruth (Mollica) McKenna. She attended Our Lady of Lourdes High School. She graduated from the White Plains Hospital School of Nursing in 1964, and became a registered nurse. On October 29, 1966, she married Daniel G. Hickey, and they had one son.

She entered politics as a Democrat, and was a member of the Dutchess County Legislature. In November 1990, she unseated the Republican Assemblyman Donald H. McMillen, and was a member of the New York State Assembly (97th D.) in 1993 and 1994. In 1994, she graduated B.A. from Marist College. In November 1994, she ran for re-election, but was defeated by Republican Joel M. Miller. Afterwards she became an aide to State Senate Minority Leader Martin Connor.

She died on March 5, 1999, and was buried at the Saint Peter Cemetery in Poughkeepsie.

New York State Assembly
Preceded by Donald H. McMillen	New York State Assembly; 97nd District; 1993–1994	Succeeded by Joel M. Miller
