= William Parment =

American politician (born 1942)

Member of the New York State Assembly from the 150th district
- In office January 5, 1983 – December 31, 2010
- Preceded by: Rolland E. Kidder
- Succeeded by: Andy Goodell

Personal details
- Born: March 5, 1942 (age 84) Jamestown, New York, U.S.
- Party: Democratic
- Education: State University Agricultural and Technical College (AAS); State University of New York at New Paltz (BS)
- Profession: politician

William L. Parment (born March 5, 1942) is an American politician from New York.

Parment was born on March 5, 1942, in Jamestown, New York, and raised in Ellington. He is a "sixth generation Chautauqua County native". He graduated A.A.S. from the State University Agricultural and Technical College and B.S. from SUNY New Paltz. He worked as a civil technician within the construction industry as well as a facilities planner for the State University of New York.

He entered politics as a Democrat, and in 1974 ran unsuccessfully for Congress in the 39th District, losing to the incumbent James F. Hastings.

Parment was a member of the New York State Assembly from 1983 to 2010, sitting in the 185th, 186th, 187th, 188th, 189th, 190th, 191st, 192nd, 193rd, 194th, 195th, 196th, 197th and 198th New York State Legislatures. he represented District 150, which includes most of Chautauqua County (all except the towns that border Cattaraugus County on Chautauqua's east side, including the cities of Jamestown and Dunkirk. He was the Co-Chairman of the Legislative Taskforce on Demographic Research and Reapportionment.

Parment announced his retirement at the end of 2010. Republican Andy Goodell, a former county executive of Chautauqua County, was elected as his replacement effective January 2011. Since his retirement, Parment has resided in Ithaca, New York.

New York State Assembly
| Preceded by Rolland E. Kidder | New York State Assembly; 150th District; 1983–2010 | Succeeded by Andy Goodell |
