= Harvey Weisenberg =

American politician

Member of the New York State Assembly from the 20th district
- In office February 14, 1989 – December 31, 2014
- Preceded by: Arthur J. Kremer
- Succeeded by: Todd Kaminsky

Personal details
- Born: December 31, 1933 (age 92) The Bronx, New York City
- Party: Democratic
- Spouse: Ellen Weisenberg (1934-2016)
- Children: five
- Education: New York University; Hofstra University
- Profession: politician

Harvey Weisenberg (born December 31, 1933) is an American politician from New York.

== Biography ==
Weisenberg was born on December 31, 1933, and has been a lifelong resident of Long Beach, New York. He graduated from Long Beach High School in 1952. After attending Niagara University on a basketball scholarship, he earned a Bachelor of Science degree from New York University in 1958. He holds a Master of Science degree from Hofstra University (1962), along with a professional diploma in administration from the Long Island University C.W. Post Campus (1981). He served as a police officer for the City of Long Beach, then spent over 20 years (1967–1989) working for the East Meadow School District, starting as a teacher and eventually becoming an administrator. He and his wife Ellen have five children.

Weisenberg also entered politics as a Democrat, and was a member of the Long Beach City Council. He was President of the Long Beach City Council in 1977 and 1980.

On February 14, 1989, he was elected to the State Assembly, to fill the vacancy caused by the resignation of Arthur J. Kremer. He was re-elected many times, and remained in the Assembly until 2014, sitting in the 188th, 189th, 190th, 191st, 192nd, 193rd, 194th, 195th, 196th, 197th, 198th, 199th and 200th New York State Legislatures. He represented the 20th assembly district which comprised Atlantic Beach, Long Beach, Lido Beach, Island Park, Oceanside, East Rockaway, the Five Towns, and parts of Lynbrook and Rockville Centre. He rose to the position of Assistant Speaker Pro Tempore. In 2007, he sponsored Jonathan's Law. Weisenberg announced on April 28, 2014, that he would not seek re-election.

New York State Assembly
Preceded by Arthur J. Kremer	New York State Assembly; 20th District; 1989–2014	Succeeded by Todd Kaminsky
