= Timothy P. Gordon =

American politician

Timothy P. Gordon is an American former politician from New York who served in the New York State Assembly for two terms. He was first elected in 2006 and was re-elected in 2008 to represent the 108th Assembly District. A member of the Independence Party, Gordon caucused with the Assembly's Democratic majority.

Gordon's accomplishments during his tenure in the Assembly included his sponsorship of the following bills that became law: (a) renewable energy legislation that allowed net metering for businesses, government buildings, and farms.

After having voted against same-sex marriage in 2007, Gordon voted "yes" on same-sex marriage legislation that passed the Assembly in May 2009.

Gordon was defeated by Republican Steven McLaughlin in his 2010 bid for re-election after Gordon was filmed disposing of his opponent's lawn signs and calling an alleged constituent a "fraud".

New York State Assembly
Preceded by Pat M. Casale	New York State Assembly, 108th District; 2007–2010	Succeeded by Steven McLaughlin
