= Tony Jordan (politician) =

American politician (born 1964)

District Attorney of Washington County
- Incumbent
- Assumed office January 2014
- Preceded by: Kevin C. Kortright

Member of the New York State Assembly from the 113th district
- In office January 2009 – November 2013
- Preceded by: Roy McDonald
- Succeeded by: Carrie Woerner

Personal details
- Born: James Anthony Jordan; September 9, 1964 (age 62)
- Party: Republican
- Spouse: Wendy Skellie Jordan
- Children: 4
- Profession: lawyer, politician
- Website: Official website

J. Anthony Jordan (born September 9, 1964) is an American politician and former Republican member of the New York State Assembly, representing the 113th Assembly District from 2009-2013. He is the District Attorney of Washington County, New York.

Jordan received a bachelor's degree in business with a concentration in finance from the University of Notre Dame in 1986. He earned a J.D. degree (magna cum laude) from the University of Pennsylvania Law School in 1995. He was a partner in the law firm of Jordan & Kelly LLC. Prior to being elected, he served part-time as Assistant District Attorney in Washington County.

In 2008, he was elected to replace Assemblyman Roy McDonald, who was running for the New York State Senate. Jordan won his November 2008 general election with 57 percent of the vote and ran uncontested in the November 2010 general election.

In April 2013, Jordan announced he would run for Washington County District Attorney. On November 5, 2013, Jordan ran on the Republican, Conservative, and Independent Party lines defeating incumbent District Attorney Kevin Kortright who ran on the Democratic line.

As District Attorney, Jordan serves as the lead prosecutor for the case surrounding the 2023 Killing of Kaylin Gillis in the Town of Hebron, New York.

Jordan resides near Greenwich, New York. He and his wife Wendy Jordan (née Skellie) have four children.

== See also ==
- List of political parties in the United States

New York State Assembly
Preceded by Roy J. McDonald	New York State Assembly, 112th District; January 1, 2009 – December 31, 2012	Succeeded by James N. Tedisco
Preceded by Teresa R. Sayward	New York State Assembly, 113th District; January 1, 2013 – December 31, 2014	Vacant Resigned
Legal offices
Preceded by Kevin C. Kortright	District Attorney of Washington County; January 1, 2014 – present	Incumbent
