= Robert Reilly (politician) =

American politician

Assemblyman, 109th District
- In office 2005–2012
- Preceded by: Robert Prentiss
- Succeeded by: Phillip Steck

Personal details
- Party: Democratic
- Spouse: Mary Reilly
- Religion: Roman Catholic

Robert Reilly (born c. 1939) is a former member of the New York State Assembly for the 109th district.

== Career ==
A Democrat, Reilly was first elected to the New York State Assembly in 2004. Reilly has made three pledges: 1) to be a legislator loyal to his constituents, not a political party; 2) to visit each neighborhood in the district twice a year; and 3) to donate his entire Assembly salary to charity. (To date Reilly has donated nearly $145,000 to local charitable organizations.) During his first two terms in office, the Legislature passed the first two on-time budgets in 21 years, brought reform to the budget process, ethics and lobbying practices and public authorities, and enacted a new law that will provide greater public disclosure of state contracts. Reilly also is pushing for further reforms in areas like campaign finance.

Reilly served as the former president of the Shaker Heritage Society and Co-Chair of the Mohawk Valley Heritage Corridor Commission. He has been a Board Member of the Erie Canalway National Heritage Corridor Commission. Reilly was a high school teacher for ten years, including two years in Uganda. He is the retired director of the New York State Education Department's Office of Public Broadcasting. In 2006, he sold his small business of 30 years, the Partridge Pub.

Beginning in 1970, Reilly was cross country coach at Siena College for 17 years and is a member of Siena's Hall of Fame. Earlier, he coached at Holy Cross High School in Flushing, New York, and Hendricksen High School in Warwick, Rhode Island.

Reilly is a 1961 graduate of the University of Notre Dame, where he received his Bachelor of Arts degree and received his Master's from the College of Saint Rose. He completed all coursework for a Ph.D. at Rensselaer Polytechnic Institute. Reilly resides in Latham, New York with his wife Mary.

New York State Assembly
Preceded by Robert Prentiss	New York State Assembly, 109th District; 2005–2012	Succeeded by Phillip Steck
