= Joel M. Miller =

American politician

Joel M. Miller (born 1943) is an American retired politician and dentist by profession from New York State. He represented District 102 in the New York State Assembly, which comprised Hyde Park, Fishkill, the town of Poughkeepsie, Clinton, Wappinger and La Grange within Dutchess County, New York. He is a Republican.

Miller holds a B.S. from the City College of New York, as well as a D.D.S. from Columbia University's School of Dental and Oral Surgery. He served in the United States Air Force on active duty from 1967 to 1969, remaining in the Air Force Reserve as a captain until approximately 1977. He was also a major in the New York State Guard.

After returning to New York in 1969, Miller established a dental practice in Poughkeepsie, which he maintained for three decades. He served as a member of the executive committee of the Duchess County Dental Society for 26 years. He served as treasurer of the same organization for five years and was its president for two years. He was once the president of the Mid-Hudson Dental Management and Marketing Corporation and remains a member of its executive committee.

New York State Assembly
Preceded by Eileen Hickey	New York State Assembly, 97th District; 1995–2002	Succeeded by Howard Mills III
Preceded by John Faso	New York State Assembly, 102nd District; 2003–2012	Incumbent
