= Andy Goodell =

American politician (born 1954)

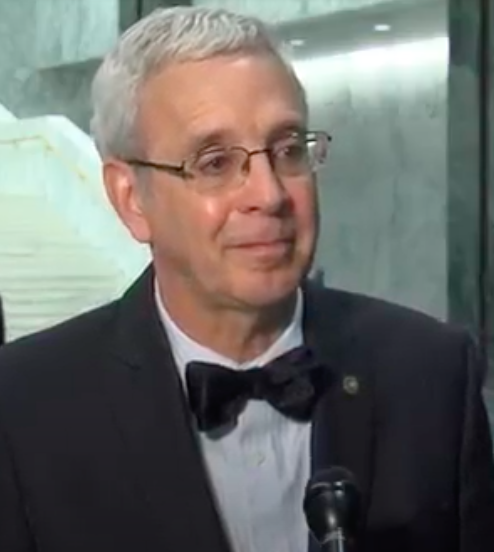
- Goodell in 2021

Member of the New York State Assembly from the 150th district
- In office January 1, 2011 – December 31, 2024
- Preceded by: William Parment
- Succeeded by: Andrew Molitor

Chautauqua County Executive
- In office January 1, 1990 – December 31, 1997
- Preceded by: John A. Glenzer
- Succeeded by: Mark W. Thomas

Personal details
- Born: December 1, 1954 (age 71) Jamestown, New York, U.S.
- Party: Republican
- Spouse: Lisa Goodell
- Children: 4
- Relatives: Charles Goodell (uncle); Roger Goodell (cousin)
- Education: Williams College; Cornell Law School
- Profession: Politician
- Website: Official website

Andrew W. Goodell (born December 1, 1954) is an American politician who was elected to the New York State Assembly in 2010. He is a Republican. Previously, Goodell was the County Executive of Chautauqua County, New York. Goodell represents the 150th Assembly District, which is numerically the last, and geographically the westernmost, of the 150 districts in the Assembly and, as of the 2012 redistricting, aligns with the boundaries of Chautauqua County.

== Career ==
Goodell is the managing partner of the law firm of Goodell & Rankin. He has been practicing law since 1982 and was admitted to practice by the New York State Bar Association, The District of Columbia Bar and the Virginia State Bar. His practice areas included Real Estate Law, Business Law, Corporate Law, Banking Law, Municipal Law and Litigation. Previously, he served as County Executive for eight years. Goodell announced his intentions to run against incumbent Democratic assemblyman William Parment in summer 2010. After Parment dropped his re-election bid, Democrats chose former county legislator and frequent candidate Nancy Bargar as Goodell's opponent, whom Goodell dispatched in the general election in November 2010.

== Personal life ==
Goodell is a magna cum laude graduate of Cornell Law School, where he received the American Jurisprudence Award for Administrative Law and was a member of the Cornell Law Review. He also has a degree in political economics and mathematics from Williams College.

He is a member of the Goodell family, whose members also include former U.S. senator Charles Goodell and current National Football League commissioner Roger Goodell.

Political offices
| Preceded by John A. Glenzer | Chautauqua County, New York Executive; January 1, 1990 – December 31, 1997 | Succeeded by Mark W. Thomas |
New York State Assembly
| Preceded by William Parment | New York State Assembly, 150th District; January 1, 2011 – present | Incumbent |
