= Dennis Gabryszak =

American politician

Dennis H. Gabryszak

Member of the New York State Assembly from the 143rd District
- In office January 1, 2007 – January 12, 2014
- Preceded by: Paul Tokasz
- Succeeded by: Angela Wozniak

Town Supervisor of Cheektowaga
- In office January 1, 1993 – December 31, 2006
- Preceded by: Frank Swiatek
- Succeeded by: James J. Jankowiak

Personal details
- Party: Democratic
- Spouse: Louise A. Gabryszak
- Occupation: Lawyer

Dennis H. Gabryszak is an American former politician from the state of New York. A Democrat, Gabryszak was a member of the New York State Assembly for the 143rd district from 2007 until his January 2014 resignation. He resigned from office after seven staffers accused him of sexual harassment. Gabryszak was later fined $100,000 for sexual harassment and for misuse of state resources.

== Life and career ==
Gabryszak is of Polish heritage.

A Democrat, Gabryszak was first elected to the New York State Assembly in 2006. He previously served on the Cheektowaga Town Board and served as town supervisor of Cheektowaga from 1993 to 2006. He served in the Assembly from 2007 to 2014. Gabryszak represented the 143rd Assembly District.

In 2012, New York Governor Andrew Cuomo signed a Gabryzak-supported bill requiring emergency escape systems for all firefighters.

=== Harassment allegations, resignation, and aftermath ===
In December 2013, three of Gabryszak's former legislative staffers accused him of sexual harassment. By January 2014, that number had grown to seven. One accuser, Kristy Mazurek, stated that "she was upset with Gabryszak's sexual comments and behavior, including invitations to join him for massages and a suggestion of a staff Christmas photo in which Mazurek and another female staffer would dress in 'sexy elf costumes and that he should be Santa with them sitting on his lap'". Gabryszak was also accused of pressuring staffers to accompany him to strip clubs and sending staffers a video that "appeared to show the legislator receiving oral sex".

New York Governor Andrew Cuomo stated that Gabryszak should address the sexual harassment allegations or resign. Gabryszak resigned his Assembly seat on January 12, 2014.

In addition to being accused of sexual harassment, Gabryszak was also accused of using state resources in connection with a re-election campaign.

The Joint Commission on Public Ethics found that Gabryszak had harassed members of his staff and had misused state resources. In February 2016, the bipartisan Legislative Ethics Commission released a report concluding that Gabryszak had broken the Public Officers Law. The Commission fined Gabryszak $70,000 for his mistreatment of female staffers and $30,000 for misuse of state resources.

In 2019, the state settled a lawsuit with one of Gabryszak's accusers for $125,000.

Political offices
Preceded by Frank Swiatek	Supervisor of Cheektowaga, New York; January 1, 1993 – December 31, 2006	Succeeded by James J. Jankowiak
New York State Assembly
Preceded by Paul A. Tokasz	New York State Assembly, 143rd District; January 1, 2007 – January 12, 2014	Succeeded by Angela Wozniak
