= Teresa Sayward =

American politician (born 1944/45)

Member of the New York State Assembly from the 113th Assembly district
- In office 2003–2013
- Preceded by: Elizabeth Little
- Succeeded by: Tony Jordan

Town supervisor of Willsboro
- In office 1992–2002

Personal details
- Born: 1944 or 1945 (age 81–82)
- Party: Republican
- Other political affiliations: Independence
- Spouse: Kenneth Sayward
- Relations: Beatrice Riley (mother)
- Children: Four
- Occupation: Former dairy farmer
- Website: Official website

Teresa R. Sayward (born 1944/1945) was a member of the New York State Assembly for Willsboro (the 113th district), first elected in 2002. She is a Republican.

== Career ==
Sayward was a dairy farmer with her husband Ken for 16 years until 1988, when they sold their farm due it becoming unprofitable. She has also worked as a real estate agent, an antiques dealer and as an interior decorator. After leaving dairy farming she stood for election as the Republican candidate for town supervisor of Willsboro, winning on her second attempt in 1992.

== Political history ==
Sayward served as town supervisor for the Town of Willsboro for 11 years and as chairwoman of the Essex County Board of Supervisors. She was awarded the title of "Outstanding Local Official" for 2002 by the Adirondack Park Local Government Review Board.

Sayward was elected to the New York State Assembly in 2002, replacing Elizabeth Little (who ran for State Senate that year) in a six-way contest in which she won 52% of the vote. Sayward had narrowly beaten Thomas Scozzafava to the Republican nomination, and he stood against her as a Conservative candidate. Sayward spent $112,000 on the campaign. In 2006 she became the secretary of the Assembly Republican Conference.

She ran unopposed, as a Republican with the endorsement of the Independence Party of New York, in the November 2008 and November 2010 general elections. Sayward retired from the Assembly at the end of 2012.

In 2012, she supported Democratic President Barack Obama for re-election.

=== Positions ===
Sayward favored lowering health care costs, workers' compensation costs, and local property taxes. She argued for extensive state budget cuts. She supported Governor David Paterson's 2009 proposal to legalize same-sex marriage in New York and gave an emotional speech in the State Assembly that helped pass a bill for legalization. Her elder son Glenn is gay, and she views gay marriage as a civil rights issue; she received significant campaign donations from out of state as a result of her position, but lost the endorsement of the Conservative Party of New York State. She campaigned nationally for gay rights and became involved with the Log Cabin Republicans. She supported her friend Dede Scozzafava's 2009 campaign for Congress. She is a member of the National Rifle Association.

== Family ==
Sayward and her husband Kenneth have four children: Glenn (b. 1961), Yvonne (b. 1963/1964), Kyle (1969–2007), and Wendy (b. 1972/1973).

New York State Assembly
Preceded by Marc W. Butler	New York State Assembly; 113th District; 2003–2014	Succeeded by Carrie Woerner
