= Addie Jenne =

American politician

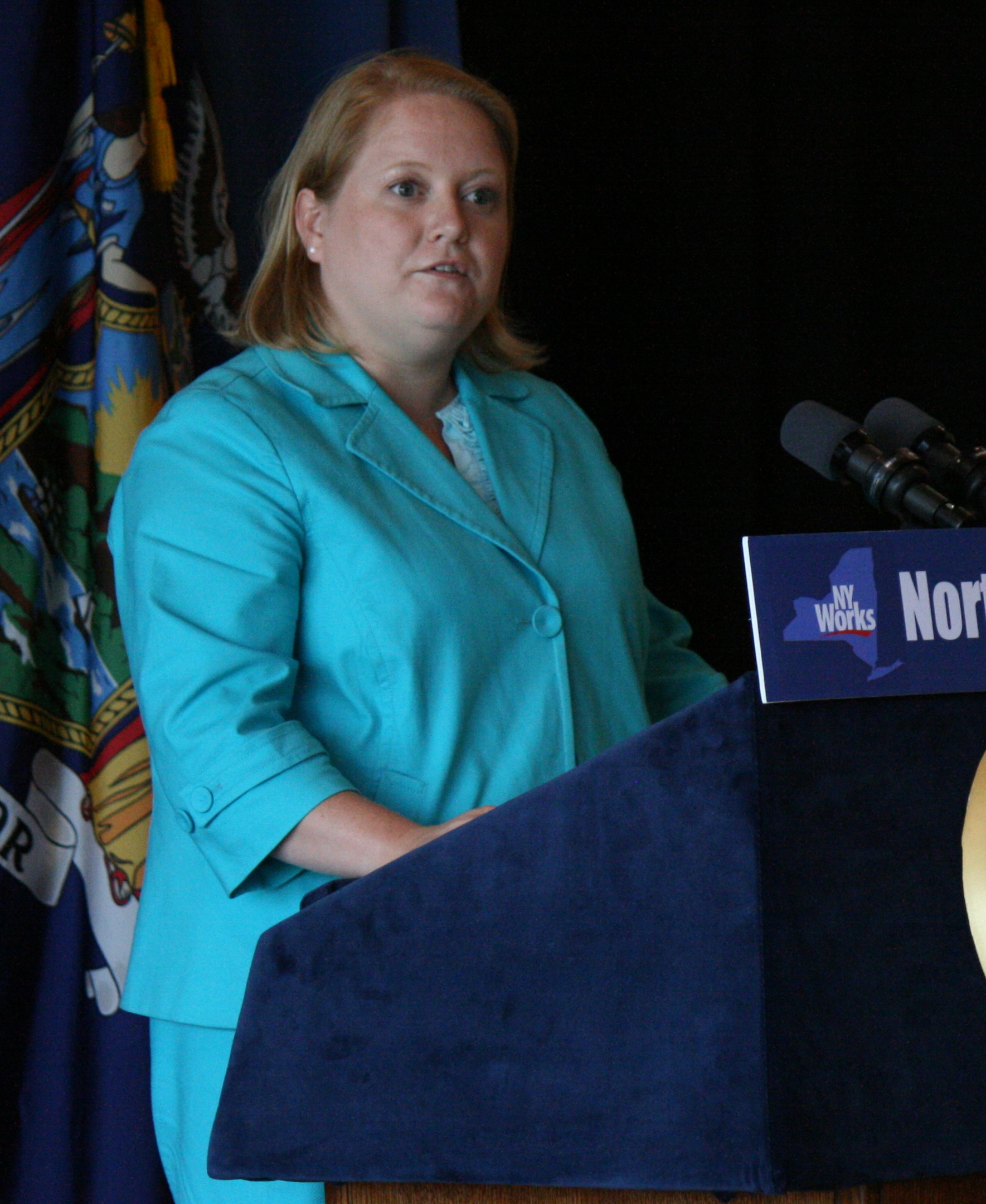
- Jenne in 2011

Member of the New York State Assembly from the 116th district
- In office January 1, 2009 – January 1, 2019
- Preceded by: Darrel Aubertine
- Succeeded by: Mark Walczyk

Personal details
- Education: University at Albany; Syracuse University College of Law
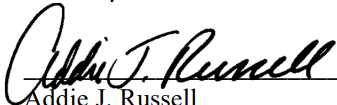
- Signature
- Website: Official website

Addie Jenne (previously Addie Jenne Russell) is the former New York State Democratic Assemblywoman for the 118th/116th district from 2009 to 2019. The district was known as the 118th district when Jenne was elected in 2008, but was re-numbered during her tenure in office, in the 2012 New York legislative redistricting. The district is known as "The River District" for its place on the St. Lawrence River, and it covers parts of Jefferson and St. Lawrence counties, including Watertown and Potsdam.

One of five siblings, Jenne's family has lived in New York State's North Country for seven generations; her father was a mechanic. She was a member of the Jefferson County Board of Legislators, a seat which became vacant with her election to the assembly. She earned her B.A. degree from SUNY Albany and her J.D. from Syracuse University College of Law. She was defeated for reelection in 2018 by Republican Mark Walczyk.
