= J. Gary Pretlow =

American politician

Member of the New York State Assembly from the 89th district
- Incumbent
- Assumed office January 1, 1993
- Preceded by: Gregory P. Young (redistricting)
- Constituency: 84th district (1993-2002); 87th district (2003-2012); 89th district (2013-present)

Chair of the New York State Assembly Ways & Means Committee
- Incumbent
- Assumed office January 6, 2025
- Preceded by: Helene Weinstein

Personal details
- Born: August 27, 1949 (age 77) Queens, New York, U.S.
- Party: Democratic
- Education: Baruch College (BS)
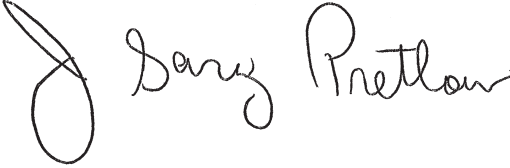
- Signature
- Website: Official website

James Gary Pretlow (born August 27, 1949) is a member of the New York State Assembly representing the 89th Assembly District. First elected in 1992, Pretlow is a Democrat. Before being elected to the assembly, he served on the Mount Vernon City Council. Pretlow chaired the Assembly Committee on Racing and Wagering from 2011 to 2024. He now chairs the Committee on Ways and Means.

On January 17, 2023, Pretlow introduced Assembly Bill 1380 which would legalize some forms of online poker in New York by classifying them as skill-based games.

New York State Assembly
Preceded by Cecile D. Singer	New York State Assembly; 84th District; 1993–2002	Succeeded by Carmen E. Arroyo
Preceded by Mike Spano	New York State Assembly; 87th District; 2003–2012	Succeeded by Luis R. Sepúlveda
Preceded by Robert Castelli	New York State Assembly; 89th District; 2013–present	Incumbent
