= 194th New York State Legislature =

New York state legislative session

| ← | 193rd | 195th | → |
- New York State Capitol (2009)

Overview
- Legislative body: New York State Legislature
- Jurisdiction: New York, United States
- Term: January 1, 2001 – December 31, 2002

Senate
- Members: 61
- President: Lt. Gov. Mary Donohue (R)
- Temporary President: Joseph Bruno (R)
- Party control: Republican

Assembly
- Members: 150
- Speaker: Sheldon Silver (D)
- Party control: Democratic

Sessions
- 1st: January 3 – December 31, 2001
- 2nd: January 9 – ?, 2002

The 194th New York State Legislature, consisting of the New York State Senate and the New York State Assembly, met from January 3, 2001, to December 31, 2002, during the seventh and eighth years of George Pataki's governorship, in Albany.

== State Senate ==
=== Senators ===
The asterisk (*) denotes members of the previous Legislature who continued in office as members of this Legislature.

Note: For brevity, the chairmanships omit the words "...the Committee on (the)..."

| District | Senator | Party | Notes |
|---|---|---|---|
| 1st | Kenneth LaValle* | Republican | |
| 2nd | James J. Lack* | Republican | |
| 3rd | Caesar Trunzo* | Republican | |
| 4th | Owen H. Johnson* | Republican | |
| 5th | Carl L. Marcellino* | Republican | |
| 6th | Kemp Hannon* | Republican | |
| 7th | Michael Balboni* | Republican | |
| 8th | Charles J. Fuschillo Jr.* | Republican | |
| 9th | Dean Skelos* | Republican | |
| 10th | Malcolm Smith* | Democrat | |
| 11th | Frank Padavan* | Republican | |
| 12th | Ada L. Smith* | Democrat | |
| 13th | Daniel Hevesi* | Democrat | |
| 14th | George Onorato* | Democrat | |
| 15th | Serphin R. Maltese* | Cons./Rep. | |
| 16th | Toby Ann Stavisky* | Democrat | |
| 17th | Nellie R. Santiago* | Democrat | |
| 18th | Velmanette Montgomery* | Democrat | |
| 19th | John L. Sampson* | Democrat | |
| 20th | Marty Markowitz* | Democrat | on November 6, 2001, elected Brooklyn Borough President |
| 20th | Carl Andrews | Democrat | on February 12, 2002, elected to fill vacancy |
| 21st | Carl Kruger* | Democrat | |
| 22nd | Seymour P. Lachman* | Democrat | |
| 23rd | Vincent J. Gentile* | Democrat | |
| 24th | John J. Marchi* | Republican | |
| 25th | Martin Connor* | Democrat | Minority Leader |
| 26th | Roy M. Goodman* | Republican | resigned |
| 26th | Liz Krueger | Democrat | on February 12, 2002, elected to fill vacancy |
| 27th | Thomas Duane* | Democrat | |
| 28th | Olga A. Méndez* | Democrat | |
| 29th | David Paterson* | Democrat | |
| 30th | Eric Schneiderman* | Democrat | |
| 31st | Efrain Gonzalez* | Democrat | |
| 32nd | Pedro Espada Jr. | Democrat | |
| 33rd | Ruth Hassell-Thompson | Republican | |
| 34th | Guy J. Velella* | Republican | |
| 35th | Nicholas A. Spano* | Republican | |
| 36th | Suzi Oppenheimer* | Democrat | |
| 37th | Vincent Leibell* | Republican | |
| 38th | Thomas P. Morahan* | Republican | |
| 39th | William J. Larkin Jr.* | Republican | |
| 40th | John Bonacic* | Republican | |
| 41st | Stephen M. Saland* | Republican | |
| 42nd | Neil Breslin* | Democrat | |
| 43rd | Joseph Bruno* | Republican | re-elected Temporary President |
| 44th | Hugh T. Farley* | Republican | |
| 45th | Ronald B. Stafford* | Republican | Chairman of Finance |
| 46th | James W. Wright* | Republican | |
| 47th | Raymond A. Meier* | Republican | |
| 48th | Nancy Larraine Hoffmann* | Republican | |
| 49th | John A. DeFrancisco* | Republican | |
| 50th | James L. Seward* | Republican | |
| 51st | Thomas W. Libous* | Republican | |
| 52nd | Randy Kuhl* | Republican | |
| 53rd | Michael F. Nozzolio* | Republican | |
| 54th | Richard A. Dollinger* | Democrat | |
| 55th | James S. Alesi* | Republican | |
| 56th | Patricia McGee* | Republican | |
| 57th | Byron Brown | Democrat | |
| 58th | William Stachowski* | Democrat | |
| 59th | Dale M. Volker* | Republican | |
| 60th | Mary Lou Rath* | Republican | |
| 61st | George D. Maziarz* | Republican | |

=== Employees ===
- Secretary:

== State Assembly ==
=== Assembly members ===
The asterisk (*) denotes members of the previous Legislature who continued in office as members of this Legislature.

Note: For brevity, the chairmanships omit the words "...the Committee on (the)..."

| District | Assembly member | Party | Notes |
|---|---|---|---|
| 1st | Patricia Acampora* | Republican | |
| 2nd | Fred W. Thiele Jr.* | Republican | |
| 3rd | Patricia Eddington | Democrat | |
| 4th | Steve Englebright* | Democrat | |
| 5th | Steve Levy | Democrat | |
| 6th | Robert C. Wertz* | Republican | |
| 7th | Thomas F. Barraga* | Republican | |
| 8th | Phil Boyle* | Republican | |
| 9th | John J. Flanagan* | Republican | |
| 10th | James D. Conte* | Republican | |
| 11th | Robert K. Sweeney* | Democrat | |
| 12th | Steven L. Labriola* | Republican | |
| 13th | David Sidikman* | Democrat | |
| 14th | Marc Herbst* | Republican | |
| 15th | Donna Ferrara* | Republican | |
| 16th | Thomas DiNapoli* | Democrat | |
| 17th | Maureen O'Connell* | Republican | |
| 18th | Earlene Hill Hooper* | Democrat | |
| 19th | Kate Murray* | Republican | on November 6, 2001, elected Town Clerk of Hempstead |
| 19th | David McDonough | Republican | on February 12, 2002, elected to fill vacancy |
| 20th | Harvey Weisenberg* | Democrat | |
| 21st | Robert Barra | Republican | |
| 22nd | Thomas Alfano* | Republican | |
| 23rd | Audrey Pheffer* | Democrat | |
| 24th | Mark Weprin* | Democrat | |
| 25th | Brian M. McLaughlin* | Democrat | |
| 26th | Ann-Margaret Carrozza* | Democrat | |
| 27th | Nettie Mayersohn* | Democrat | |
| 28th | Michael Cohen* | Democrat | |
| 29th | William Scarborough* | Democrat | |
| 30th | Margaret Markey* | Democrat | |
| 31st | Pauline Rhodd-Cummings* | Democrat | died on January 31, 2002 |
| 31st | Michele Titus | Democrat | on April 16, 2002, elected to fill vacancy |
| 32nd | Vivian E. Cook* | Democrat | |
| 33rd | Barbara M. Clark* | Democrat | |
| 34th | Ivan C. Lafayette* | Democrat | |
| 35th | Jeffrion L. Aubry* | Democrat | |
| 36th | Michael Gianaris | Democrat | |
| 37th | Catherine Nolan* | Democrat | |
| 38th | Anthony S. Seminerio* | Democrat | |
| 39th | Frank R. Seddio* | Democrat | |
| 40th | Diane Gordon | Democrat | |
| 41st | Helene Weinstein* | Democrat | |
| 42nd | Rhoda S. Jacobs* | Democrat | |
| 43rd | Clarence Norman Jr.* | Democrat | |
| 44th | James F. Brennan* | Democrat | |
| 45th | Steven Cymbrowitz | Democrat | |
| 46th | Adele Cohen* | Democrat | |
| 47th | William Colton* | Democrat | |
| 48th | Dov Hikind* | Democrat | |
| 49th | Peter J. Abbate Jr.* | Democrat | |
| 50th | Joseph R. Lentol* | Democrat | |
| 51st | Félix W. Ortiz* | Democrat | |
| 52nd | Joan Millman* | Democrat | |
| 53rd | Vito J. Lopez* | Democrat | |
| 54th | Darryl C. Towns* | Democrat | |
| 55th | William F. Boyland* | Democrat | |
| 56th | Albert Vann* | Democrat | on November 6, 2001, elected to the NY City Council |
| 56th | Annette Robinson | Democrat | on February 12, 2002, elected to fill vacancy |
| 57th | Roger L. Green* | Democrat | |
| 58th | N. Nick Perry* | Democrat | |
| 59th | John W. Lavelle | Democrat | |
| 60th | Eric N. Vitaliano* | Democrat | on November 6, 2001, elected to the NYC Civil Court |
| 60th | Matthew Mirones | Republican | on February 12, 2002, elected to fill vacancy |
| 61st | Robert A. Straniere* | Republican | |
| 62nd | Sheldon Silver* | Democrat | re-elected Speaker |
| 63rd | Steven Sanders* | Democrat | |
| 64th | Richard N. Gottfried* | Democrat | |
| 65th | Alexander B. Grannis* | Democrat | |
| 66th | Deborah J. Glick* | Democrat | |
| 67th | Scott Stringer* | Democrat | |
| 68th | Adam Clayton Powell IV | Democrat | |
| 69th | Edward C. Sullivan* | Democrat | |
| 70th | Keith L. T. Wright* | Democrat | |
| 71st | Herman D. Farrell Jr.* | Democrat | Chairman of Ways and Means |
| 72nd | Adriano Espaillat* | Democrat | |
| 73rd | John Ravitz* | Republican | on February 12. 2002, defeated in the 26th D. Senate special election |
| 74th | Carmen E. Arroyo* | Democrat | |
| 75th | Rubén Díaz Jr.* | Democrat | |
| 76th | Peter M. Rivera* | Democrat | |
| 77th | Aurelia Greene* | Democrat | |
| 78th | Jose Rivera | Democrat | |
| 79th | Gloria Davis* | Democrat | |
| 80th | Jeffrey D. Klein* | Democrat | |
| 81st | Jeffrey Dinowitz* | Democrat | |
| 82nd | Stephen B. Kaufman* | Democrat | |
| 83rd | Carl Heastie | Democrat | |
| 84th | J. Gary Pretlow* | Democrat | |
| 85th | Ronald C. Tocci* | Democrat | |
| 86th | Richard L. Brodsky* | Democrat | |
| 87th | Mike Spano* | Republican | |
| 88th | Amy Paulin | Democrat | |
| 89th | Naomi C. Matusow* | Democrat | |
| 90th | Sandy Galef* | Democrat | |
| 91st | Willis Stephens* | Republican | |
| 92nd | Alexander J. Gromack* | Democrat | |
| 93rd | Samuel Colman* | Democrat | |
| 94th | Nancy Calhoun* | Republican | |
| 95th | Howard Mills III | Republican | |
| 96th | Thomas J. Kirwan* | Republican | |
| 97th | Joel M. Miller* | Republican | |
| 98th | Jacob E. Gunther III* | Democrat | |
| 99th | Patrick R. Manning* | Republican | |
| 100th | Robert A. D'Andrea* | Republican | resigned in January 2002 |
| 100th | Roy J. McDonald | Republican | on February 12, 2002, elected to fill vacancy |
| 101st | Kevin A. Cahill* | Democrat | |
| 102nd | John Faso* | Republican | Minority Leader |
| 103rd | James Tedisco* | Republican | |
| 104th | John McEneny* | Democrat | |
| 105th | Paul D. Tonko* | Democrat | |
| 106th | Ronald Canestrari* | Democrat | |
| 107th | Robert G. Prentiss* | Republican | |
| 108th | Pat M. Casale* | Republican | |
| 109th | Betty Little* | Republican | |
| 110th | Chris Ortloff* | Republican | |
| 111th | Bill Magee* | Democrat | |
| 112th | Dede Scozzafava* | Republican | |
| 113th | Marc W. Butler* | Republican | |
| 114th | H. Robert Nortz* | Republican | |
| 115th | David R. Townsend Jr.* | Republican | |
| 116th | RoAnn Destito* | Democrat | |
| 117th | Frances T. Sullivan* | Republican | |
| 118th | Michael J. Bragman* | Democrat | resigned in December 2001 |
| 118th | William E. Sanford | Republican | on February 12, 2002, elected to fill vacancy |
| 119th | Joan Christensen* | Democrat | |
| 120th | William Magnarelli* | Democrat | |
| 121st | Harold C. Brown Jr.* | Republican | |
| 122nd | Clifford W. Crouch* | Republican | |
| 123rd | Jay J. Dinga* | Republican | |
| 124th | Robert J. Warner* | Republican | |
| 125th | Martin A. Luster* | Democrat | |
| 126th | Gary Finch* | Republican | |
| 127th | George H. Winner Jr.* | Republican | |
| 128th | Bob Oaks* | Republican | |
| 129th | Brian Kolb* | Republican | |
| 130th | James Bacalles* | Republican | |
| 131st | Susan V. John* | Democrat | |
| 132nd | Joseph D. Morelle* | Democrat | |
| 133rd | David F. Gantt* | Democrat | |
| 134th | Joseph Robach* | Democrat | |
| 135th | David Koon* | Democrat | |
| 136th | Joseph Errigo | Republican | |
| 137th | Charles H. Nesbitt* | Republican | |
| 138th | Francine DelMonte | Democrat | |
| 139th | David E. Seaman* | Republican | |
| 140th | Robin Schimminger* | Democrat | |
| 141st | Arthur O. Eve* | Democrat | |
| 142nd | James P. Hayes* | Republican | |
| 143rd | Paul Tokasz* | Democrat | Majority Leader |
| 144th | Sam Hoyt* | Democrat | |
| 145th | Brian Higgins* | Democrat | |
| 146th | Richard A. Smith* | Democrat | |
| 147th | Daniel Burling* | Republican | |
| 148th | Sandra Lee Wirth* | Republican | |
| 149th | Catharine Young* | Republican | |
| 150th | William Parment* | Democrat | |

=== Employees ===
- Clerk: ?

== Sources ==
- Senate election results at NYS Board of Elections
- Assembly election results at NYS Board of Elections
