= 196th New York State Legislature =

New York state legislative session

←	195th	197th	→
- New York State Capitol (2009)

Overview
- Legislative body: New York State Legislature
- Jurisdiction: New York, United States
- Term: January 1, 2005 – December 31, 2006

Senate
- Members: 62
- President: Lt. Gov. Mary Donohue (R)
- Temporary President: Joseph Bruno (R)
- Party control: Republican

Assembly
- Members: 150
- Speaker: Sheldon Silver (D)
- Party control: Democratic

Sessions
- 1st: January 5 – ?, 2005
- 2nd: January 4 – ?, 2006

The 196th New York State Legislature, consisting of the New York State Senate and the New York State Assembly, met from January 5, 2005, to December 31, 2006, during the eleventh and twelfth years of George Pataki's governorship, in Albany.

== State Senate ==
=== Senators ===
The asterisk (*) denotes members of the previous Legislature who continued in office as members of this Legislature. Jeffrey D. Klein and George H. Winner Jr. changed from the Assembly to the Senate at the beginning of this legislature. Assemblywoman Catharine Young was elected to fill a vacancy in the Senate.

Note: For brevity, the chairmanships omit the words "...the Committee on (the)..."

District	Senator	Party	Notes
1st	Kenneth LaValle*	Republican	
2nd	John J. Flanagan*	Republican	
3rd	Caesar Trunzo*	Republican	
4th	Owen H. Johnson*	Republican	
5th	Carl L. Marcellino*	Republican	
6th	Kemp Hannon*	Republican	
7th	Michael Balboni*	Republican	
8th	Charles J. Fuschillo Jr.*	Republican	
9th	Dean Skelos*	Republican	
10th	Ada L. Smith*	Democrat	
11th	Frank Padavan*	Republican	
12th	George Onorato*	Democrat	
13th	John Sabini*	Democrat	
14th	Malcolm Smith*	Democrat	
15th	Serphin R. Maltese*	Cons./Rep.	
16th	Toby Ann Stavisky*	Democrat	
17th	Martin Malave Dilan*	Democrat	
18th	Velmanette Montgomery*	Democrat	
19th	John L. Sampson*	Democrat	
20th	Carl Andrews*	Democrat	
21st	Kevin Parker*	Democrat	
22nd	Martin Golden*	Republican	
23rd	Diane Savino	Democrat	
24th	John J. Marchi*	Republican	
25th	Martin Connor*	Democrat	
26th	Liz Krueger*	Democrat	
27th	Carl Kruger*	Democrat	
28th	José M. Serrano	Democrat	
29th	Thomas Duane*	Democrat	
30th	David Paterson*	Democrat	Minority Leader; on November 7, 2006, elected Lieutenant Governor
31st	Eric Schneiderman*	Democrat	
32nd	Rubén Díaz Sr.*	Democrat	
33rd	Efrain Gonzalez Jr.*	Democrat	
34th	Jeffrey D. Klein*	Democrat	
35th	Nicholas A. Spano*	Republican	
36th	Ruth Hassell-Thompson*	Democrat	
37th	Suzi Oppenheimer*	Democrat	
38th	Thomas P. Morahan*	Republican	
39th	William J. Larkin Jr.*	Republican	
40th	Vincent Leibell*	Republican	
41st	Stephen M. Saland*	Republican	
42nd	John Bonacic*	Republican	
43rd	Joseph Bruno*	Republican	re-elected Temporary President
44th	Hugh T. Farley*	Republican	
45th	Betty Little*	Republican	
46th	Neil Breslin*	Democrat	
47th	Raymond A. Meier*	Republican	
48th	James W. Wright*	Republican	
49th	David J. Valesky	Democrat	
50th	John A. DeFrancisco*	Republican	
51st	James L. Seward*	Republican	
52nd	Thomas W. Libous*	Republican	
53rd	George H. Winner Jr.*	Republican	
54th	Michael F. Nozzolio*	Republican	
55th	James S. Alesi*	Republican	
56th	Joseph Robach*	Republican	
57th	Patricia McGee*	Republican	died on April 2, 2005
57th	Catharine Young*	Republican	on May 10, 2005, elected to fill vacancy
58th	William Stachowski*	Democrat	
59th	Dale M. Volker*	Republican	
60th	Byron Brown*	Democrat	on November 8, 2005, elected Mayor of Buffalo
60th	Marc A. Coppola	Democrat	on February 28, 2006, elected to fill vacancy
61st	Mary Lou Rath*	Republican	
62nd	George D. Maziarz*	Republican	

=== Employees ===
- Secretary: ?

== State Assembly ==
=== Assembly members ===
The asterisk (*) denotes members of the previous Legislature who continued in office as members of this Legislature.

Note: For brevity, the chairmanships omit the words "...the Committee on (the)..."

District	Assembly member	Party	Notes
1st	Patricia Acampora*	Republican	on June 16, 2005, appointed to the NYS Public Service Commission
1st	Marc Alessi	Democrat	on September 13, 2005, elected to fill vacancy
2nd	Fred W. Thiele Jr.*	Republican	
3rd	Patricia Eddington*	Democrat	
4th	Steve Englebright*	Democrat	
5th	Ginny Fields*	Democrat	
6th	Philip Ramos*	Democrat	
7th	Michael J. Fitzpatrick*	Republican	
8th	Thomas F. Barraga*	Republican	on November 8, 2005, elected to the Suffolk County Legislature
8th	Phil Boyle	Republican	on February 28, 2006, elected to fill vacancy
9th	Andrew Raia*	Republican	
10th	James D. Conte*	Republican	
11th	Robert K. Sweeney*	Democrat	
12th	Joseph Saladino*	Republican	
13th	Charles D. Lavine	Democrat	
14th	Robert Barra*	Republican	
15th	Donna Ferrara*	Republican	in April 2005 appointed to the NYS Workers Compensation Board
15th	Rob Walker	Republican	on May 24, 2005, elected to fill vacancy
16th	Thomas DiNapoli*	Democrat	
17th	Maureen O'Connell*	Republican	on November 8, 2005, elected Nassau County Clerk
17th	Thomas McKevitt	Republican	on February 28, 2006, elected to fill vacancy
18th	Earlene Hill Hooper*	Democrat	
19th	David McDonough*	Republican	
20th	Harvey Weisenberg*	Democrat	
21st	Thomas Alfano*	Republican	
22nd	Jimmy Meng	Democrat	
23rd	Audrey Pheffer*	Democrat	
24th	Mark Weprin*	Democrat	
25th	Brian M. McLaughlin*	Democrat	
26th	Ann-Margaret Carrozza*	Democrat	
27th	Nettie Mayersohn*	Democrat	
28th	Michael Cohen*	Democrat	resigned effective March 14, 2005
28th	Andrew Hevesi	Democrat	on May 10, 2005, elected to fill vacancy
29th	William Scarborough*	Democrat	
30th	Margaret Markey*	Democrat	
31st	Michele Titus*	Democrat	
32nd	Vivian E. Cook*	Democrat	
33rd	Barbara M. Clark*	Democrat	
34th	Ivan C. Lafayette*	Democrat	
35th	Jeffrion L. Aubry*	Democrat	
36th	Michael Gianaris*	Democrat	
37th	Catherine Nolan*	Democrat	
38th	Anthony S. Seminerio*	Democrat	
39th	Jose Peralta*	Democrat	
40th	Diane Gordon*	Democrat	
41st	Helene Weinstein*	Democrat	
42nd	Rhoda S. Jacobs*	Democrat	
43rd	Clarence Norman Jr.*	Democrat	lost his seat on September 27, 2005
43rd	Karim Camara	Democrat	on November 8, 2005, elected to fill vacancy
44th	James F. Brennan*	Democrat	
45th	Steven Cymbrowitz*	Democrat	
46th	Adele Cohen*	Democrat	
47th	William Colton*	Democrat	
48th	Dov Hikind*	Democrat	
49th	Peter J. Abbate Jr.*	Democrat	
50th	Joseph R. Lentol*	Democrat	
51st	Félix W. Ortiz*	Democrat	
52nd	Joan Millman*	Democrat	
53rd	Vito J. Lopez*	Democrat	
54th	Darryl C. Towns*	Democrat	
55th	William Boyland Jr.*	Democrat	
56th	Annette Robinson*	Democrat	
57th	Roger L. Green*	Democrat	
58th	N. Nick Perry*	Democrat	
59th	Frank R. Seddio*	Democrat	on November 8, 2005, elected Surrogate of Kings County
59th	Alan Maisel	Democrat	on February 28, 2006, elected to fill vacancy
60th	Matthew Mirones*	Republican	
61st	John W. Lavelle*	Democrat	
62nd	Vincent M. Ignizio	Republican	
63rd	Michael Cusick*	Democrat	
64th	Sheldon Silver*	Democrat	re-elected Speaker
65th	Alexander B. Grannis*	Democrat	
66th	Deborah J. Glick*	Democrat	
67th	Scott Stringer*	Democrat	on November 8, 2005, elected Borough President of Manhattan
67th	Linda Rosenthal	Democrat	on February 28, 2006, elected to fill vacancy
68th	Adam Clayton Powell IV*	Democrat	
69th	Daniel J. O'Donnell*	Democrat	
70th	Keith L. T. Wright*	Democrat	
71st	Herman D. Farrell Jr.*	Democrat	Chairman of Ways and Means
72nd	Adriano Espaillat*	Democrat	
73rd	Jonathan Bing*	Democrat	
74th	Steven Sanders*	Democrat	resigned effective December 31, 2005
74th	Sylvia Friedman	Democrat	on February 28, 2006, elected to fill vacancy
75th	Richard N. Gottfried*	Democrat	
76th	Peter M. Rivera*	Democrat	
77th	Aurelia Greene*	Democrat	
78th	Jose Rivera*	Democrat	
79th	Michael Benjamin*	Democrat	
80th	Naomi Rivera	Democrat	
81st	Jeffrey Dinowitz*	Democrat	
82nd	Michael Benedetto	Democrat	
83rd	Carl Heastie*	Democrat	
84th	Carmen E. Arroyo*	Democrat	
85th	Rubén Díaz Jr.*	Democrat	
86th	Luis Diaz*	Democrat	
87th	J. Gary Pretlow*	Democrat	
88th	Amy Paulin*	Democrat	
89th	Adam Bradley*	Democrat	
90th	Sandy Galef*	Democrat	
91st	George Latimer	Democrat	
92nd	Richard L. Brodsky*	Democrat	
93rd	Louis Mosiello	Republican	
94th	Kenneth Zebrowski	Democrat	
95th	Ryan Karben*	Democrat	resigned on May 18, 2006
96th	Nancy Calhoun*	Republican	
97th	Ann Rabbitt	Republican	
98th	Aileen Gunther*	Democrat	
99th	Willis Stephens*	Republican	
100th	Thomas J. Kirwan*	Republican	
101st	Kevin A. Cahill*	Democrat	
102nd	Joel M. Miller*	Republican	
103rd	Patrick R. Manning*	Republican	
104th	John McEneny*	Democrat	
105th	Paul D. Tonko*	Democrat	
106th	Ronald Canestrari*	Democrat	
107th	Clifford Crouch*	Republican	
108th	Pat M. Casale*	Republican	
109th	Robert Reilly	Democrat	
110th	Jim Tedisco*	Republican	Minority Leader from November 29, 2005
111th	Bill Magee*	Democrat	
112th	Roy J. McDonald*	Republican	
113th	Teresa Sayward*	Republican	
114th	Chris Ortloff*	Republican	in June 2006 appointed to the New York State Board of Parole
115th	David R. Townsend Jr.*	Republican	
116th	RoAnn Destito*	Democrat	
117th	Marc W. Butler*	Republican	
118th	Darrel Aubertine*	Democrat	
119th	Joan Christensen*	Democrat	
120th	William Magnarelli*	Democrat	
121st	Jeffrey Brown*	Republican	
122nd	Dede Scozzafava*	Republican	
123rd	Gary Finch*	Republican	
124th	William Barclay*	Republican	
125th	Barbara Lifton*	Democrat	
126th	Donna Lupardo	Democrat	
127th	Daniel L. Hooker*	Republican	
128th	Bob Oaks*	Republican	
129th	Brian Kolb*	Republican	
130th	Joseph Errigo*	Republican	
131st	Susan V. John*	Democrat	
132nd	Joseph D. Morelle*	Democrat	
133rd	David Gantt*	Democrat	
134th	Bill Reilich*	Republican	
135th	David Koon*	Democrat	
136th	James Bacalles*	Republican	
137th	Tom O'Mara	Republican	
138th	Francine DelMonte*	Democrat	
139th	Charles H. Nesbitt*	Republican	Minority Leader until November 23, 2005; on November 23, 2005, appointed to the NYS Tax Appeals Tribunal
139th	Stephen Hawley	Republican	on February 28, 2006, elected to fill vacancy
140th	Robin Schimminger*	Democrat	
141st	Crystal Peoples*	Democrat	
142nd	Sandra Lee Wirth*	Republican	died on March 11, 2006
142nd	Michael W. Cole	Republican	on May 2, 2006, elected to fill vacancy
143rd	Paul Tokasz*	Democrat	Majority Leader
144th	Sam Hoyt*	Democrat	
145th	Mark J. F. Schroeder	Democrat	
146th	Jack Quinn III	Republican	
147th	Daniel Burling*	Republican	
148th	James P. Hayes*	Republican	
149th	Catharine Young*	Republican	on May 10, 2005, elected to the State Senate
149th	Joseph Giglio	Republican	on June 28, 2005, elected to fill vacancy
150th	William L. Parment*	Democrat	

=== Employees ===
- Clerk: ?

== Sources ==
- Senate election results at NYS Board of Elections
- Assembly election results at NYS Board of Elections
