= 195th New York State Legislature =

New York state legislative session

←	194th	196th	→
- New York State Capitol (2009)

Overview
- Legislative body: New York State Legislature
- Jurisdiction: New York, United States
- Term: January 1, 2003 – December 31, 2004

Senate
- Members: 62
- President: Lt. Gov. Mary Donohue (Republican)
- Temporary President: Joseph Bruno (Republican)
- Party control: Republican

Assembly
- Members: 150
- Speaker: Sheldon Silver (Democrat)
- Party control: Democrat

Sessions
- 1st: January 8 – ?, 2003
- 2nd: January 7 – ?, 2004

The 195th New York State Legislature, consisting of the New York State Senate and the New York State Assembly, met from January 8, 2003, to December 31, 2004, during the ninth and tenth years of George Pataki's governorship, in Albany.

== State Senate ==
=== Senators ===
The asterisk (*) denotes members of the previous Legislature who continued in office as members of this Legislature. Betty Little and Joseph Robach changed from the Assembly to the Senate at the beginning of this legislature.

Note: For brevity, the chairmanships omit the words "...the Committee on (the)..."

District	Senator	Party	Notes
1st	Kenneth LaValle*	Republican	
2nd	John J. Flanagan	Republican	
3rd	Caesar Trunzo*	Republican	
4th	Owen H. Johnson*	Republican	
5th	Carl L. Marcellino*	Republican	
6th	Kemp Hannon*	Republican	
7th	Michael Balboni*	Republican	
8th	Charles J. Fuschillo Jr.*	Republican	
9th	Dean Skelos*	Republican	
10th	Ada L. Smith*	Democrat	
11th	Frank Padavan*	Republican	
12th	George Onorato*	Democrat	
13th	John Sabini	Democrat	
14th	Malcolm Smith*	Democrat	
15th	Serphin R. Maltese*	Cons./Rep.	
16th	Toby Ann Stavisky*	Democrat	
17th	Martin Malave Dilan	Democrat	
18th	Velmanette Montgomery*	Democrat	
19th	John L. Sampson*	Democrat	
20th	Carl Andrews*	Democrat	
21st	Kevin Parker	Democrat	
22nd	Martin Golden	Republican	
23rd	Seymour P. Lachman*	Democrat	
24th	John J. Marchi*	Republican	
25th	Martin Connor*	Democrat	
26th	Liz Krueger*	Democrat	
27th	Carl Kruger*	Democrat	
28th	Olga A. Méndez*	Democrat	
29th	Thomas Duane*	Democrat	
30th	David Paterson*	Democrat	Minority Leader
31st	Eric Schneiderman*	Democrat	
32nd	Rubén Díaz Sr.	Democrat	
33rd	Efrain Gonzalez Jr.*	Democrat	
34th	Guy J. Velella*	Republican	resigned on May 14, 2004
35th	Nicholas A. Spano*	Republican	
36th	Ruth Hassell-Thompson*	Democrat	
37th	Suzi Oppenheimer*	Democrat	
38th	Thomas P. Morahan*	Republican	
39th	William J. Larkin Jr.*	Republican	
40th	Vincent Leibell*	Republican	
41st	Stephen M. Saland*	Republican	
42nd	John Bonacic*	Republican	
43rd	Joseph Bruno*	Republican	re-elected Temporary President
44th	Hugh T. Farley*	Republican	
45th	Betty Little*	Republican	
46th	Neil Breslin*	Democrat	
47th	Raymond A. Meier*	Republican	
48th	James W. Wright*	Republican	
49th	Nancy Larraine Hoffmann*	Republican	
50th	John A. DeFrancisco*	Republican	
51st	James L. Seward*	Republican	
52nd	Thomas W. Libous*	Republican	
53rd	Randy Kuhl*	Republican	
54th	Michael F. Nozzolio*	Republican	
55th	James S. Alesi*	Republican	
56th	Joseph Robach*	Republican	
57th	Patricia McGee*	Republican	
58th	William Stachowski*	Democrat	
59th	Dale M. Volker*	Republican	
60th	Byron Brown*	Democrat	
61st	Mary Lou Rath*	Republican	
62nd	George D. Maziarz*	Republican	

=== Employees ===
- Secretary:

=== Assembly members ===
The asterisk (*) denotes members of the previous Legislature who continued in office as members of this Legislature.

Note: For brevity, the chairmanships omit the words "...the Committee on (the)..."

District	Assembly member	Party	Notes
1st	Patricia Acampora*	Republican	
2nd	Fred W. Thiele Jr.*	Republican	
3rd	Patricia Eddington*	Democrat	
4th	Steve Englebright*	Democrat	
5th	Steve Levy*	Democrat	on November 4, 2003, elected Suffolk County Executive
5th	Ginny Fields	Democrat	on March 9, 2004, elected to fill vacancy
6th	Philip Ramos	Democrat	
7th	Michael J. Fitzpatrick	Republican	
8th	Thomas F. Barraga*	Republican	
9th	Andrew Raia	Republican	
10th	James D. Conte*	Republican	
11th	Robert K. Sweeney*	Democrat	
12th	Steven L. Labriola*	Republican	on November 4, 2003, elected Town Clerk of Oyster Bay
12th	Joseph Saladino	Republican	on March 9, 2004, elected to fill vacancy
13th	David Sidikman*	Democrat	
14th	Robert Barra*	Republican	
15th	Donna Ferrara*	Republican	
16th	Thomas DiNapoli*	Democrat	
17th	Maureen O'Connell*	Republican	
18th	Earlene Hill Hooper*	Democrat	
19th	David McDonough*	Republican	
20th	Harvey Weisenberg*	Democrat	
21st	Thomas Alfano*	Republican	
22nd	Barry Grodenchik	Democrat	
23rd	Audrey Pheffer*	Democrat	
24th	Mark Weprin*	Democrat	
25th	Brian M. McLaughlin*	Democrat	
26th	Ann-Margaret Carrozza*	Democrat	
27th	Nettie Mayersohn*	Democrat	
28th	Michael Cohen*	Democrat	
29th	William Scarborough*	Democrat	
30th	Margaret Markey*	Democrat	
31st	Michele Titus*	Democrat	
32nd	Vivian E. Cook*	Democrat	
33rd	Barbara M. Clark*	Democrat	
34th	Ivan C. Lafayette*	Democrat	
35th	Jeffrion L. Aubry*	Democrat	
36th	Michael Gianaris*	Democrat	
37th	Catherine Nolan*	Democrat	
38th	Anthony S. Seminerio*	Democrat	
39th	Jose Peralta	Democrat	
40th	Diane Gordon*	Democrat	
41st	Helene Weinstein*	Democrat	
42nd	Rhoda S. Jacobs*	Democrat	
43rd	Clarence Norman Jr.*	Democrat	
44th	James F. Brennan*	Democrat	
45th	Steven Cymbrowitz*	Democrat	
46th	Adele Cohen*	Democrat	
47th	William Colton*	Democrat	
48th	Dov Hikind*	Democrat	
49th	Peter J. Abbate Jr.*	Democrat	
50th	Joseph R. Lentol*	Democrat	
51st	Félix W. Ortiz*	Democrat	
52nd	Joan Millman*	Democrat	
53rd	Vito J. Lopez*	Democrat	
54th	Darryl C. Towns*	Democrat	
55th	William F. Boyland*	Democrat	resigned in January 2003
55th	William Boyland Jr.	Democrat	on February 25, 2003, elected to fill vacancy
56th	Annette Robinson*	Democrat	
57th	Roger L. Green*	Democrat	resigned on June 1, 2004
58th	N. Nick Perry*	Democrat	
59th	Frank R. Seddio*	Democrat	
60th	Matthew Mirones*	Republican	
61st	John W. Lavelle*	Democrat	
62nd	Robert A. Straniere*	Republican	
63rd	Michael Cusick	Democrat	
64th	Sheldon Silver*	Democrat	re-elected Speaker
65th	Alexander B. Grannis*	Democrat	
66th	Deborah J. Glick*	Democrat	
67th	Scott Stringer*	Democrat	
68th	Adam Clayton Powell IV*	Democrat	
69th	Daniel J. O'Donnell	Democrat	
70th	Keith L. T. Wright*	Democrat	
71st	Herman D. Farrell Jr.*	Democrat	Chairman of Ways and Means
72nd	Adriano Espaillat*	Democrat	
73rd	Jonathan Bing	Democrat	
74th	Steven Sanders*	Democrat	
75th	Richard N. Gottfried*	Democrat	
76th	Peter M. Rivera*	Democrat	
77th	Aurelia Greene*	Democrat	
78th	Jose Rivera*	Democrat	
79th	Gloria Davis*	Democrat	resigned on January 6, 2003
79th	Michael Benjamin	Democrat	on February 25, 2003, elected to fill vacancy
80th	Jeffrey D. Klein*	Democrat	
81st	Jeffrey Dinowitz*	Democrat	
82nd	Stephen B. Kaufman*	Democrat	
83rd	Carl Heastie*	Democrat	
84th	Carmen E. Arroyo*	Democrat	
85th	Rubén Díaz Jr.*	Democrat	
86th	Luis Diaz	Democrat	
87th	J. Gary Pretlow*	Democrat	
88th	Amy Paulin*	Democrat	
89th	Adam Bradley	Democrat	
90th	Sandy Galef*	Democrat	
91st	Ronald C. Tocci*	Ind. Dem.	
92nd	Richard L. Brodsky*	Democrat	
93rd	Mike Spano*	Republican	
94th	Alexander J. Gromack*	Democrat	
95th	Ryan Karben	Democrat	
96th	Nancy Calhoun*	Republican	
97th	Howard Mills III*	Republican	
98th	Jacob E. Gunther III*	Democrat	died on July 9, 2003
98th	Aileen Gunther	Democrat	on November 4, 2003, elected to fill vacancy
99th	Willis Stephens*	Republican	
100th	Thomas J. Kirwan*	Republican	
101st	Kevin A. Cahill*	Democrat	
102nd	Joel M. Miller*	Republican	
103rd	Patrick R. Manning*	Republican	
104th	John McEneny*	Democrat	
105th	Paul D. Tonko*	Democrat	
106th	Ronald Canestrari*	Democrat	
107th	Clifford Crouch*	Republican	
108th	Pat M. Casale*	Republican	
109th	Robert G. Prentiss*	Republican	
110th	Jim Tedisco*	Republican	
111th	Bill Magee*	Democrat	
112th	Roy J. McDonald*	Republican	
113th	Teresa Sayward	Republican	
114th	Chris Ortloff*	Republican	
115th	David R. Townsend Jr.*	Republican	
116th	RoAnn Destito*	Democrat	
117th	Marc W. Butler*	Republican	
118th	Darrel Aubertine	Democrat	
119th	Joan Christensen*	Democrat	
120th	William Magnarelli*	Democrat	
121st	Jeffrey Brown*	Republican	
122nd	Dede Scozzafava*	Republican	
123rd	Gary Finch*	Republican	
124th	William Barclay	Republican	
125th	Barbara Lifton	Democrat	
126th	Robert J. Warner*	Republican	
127th	Daniel L. Hooker	Republican	
128th	Bob Oaks*	Republican	
129th	Brian Kolb*	Republican	
130th	Joseph Errigo*	Republican	
131st	Susan V. John*	Democrat	
132nd	Joseph D. Morelle*	Democrat	
133rd	David Gantt*	Democrat	
134th	Bill Reilich	Republican	
135th	David Koon*	Democrat	
136th	James Bacalles*	Republican	
137th	George H. Winner Jr.*	Republican	
138th	Francine DelMonte*	Democrat	
139th	Charles H. Nesbitt*	Republican	Minority Leader
140th	Robin Schimminger*	Democrat	
141st	Crystal Peoples	Democrat	
142nd	Sandra Lee Wirth*	Republican	
143rd	Paul Tokasz*	Democrat	Majority Leader
144th	Sam Hoyt*	Democrat	
145th	Brian Higgins*	Democrat	
146th	Richard A. Smith*	Democrat	
147th	Daniel Burling*	Republican	
148th	James P. Hayes*	Republican	
149th	Catharine Young*	Republican	
150th	William L. Parment*	Democrat	

=== Employees ===
- Clerk: ?

== Sources ==
- Senate election results at NYS Board of Elections
- Assembly election results at NYS Board of Elections
