= 192nd New York State Legislature =

New York state legislative session

←	191st	193rd	→
- New York State Capitol (2009)

Overview
- Legislative body: New York State Legislature
- Jurisdiction: New York, United States
- Term: January 1, 1997 – December 31, 1998

Senate
- Members: 61
- President: Lt. Gov. Betsy McCaughey Ross (R)
- Temporary President: Joseph Bruno (R)
- Party control: Republican (35–26)

Assembly
- Members: 150
- Speaker: Sheldon Silver (D)
- Party control: Democratic; 1997: (96–54); 1998: (97–53)

Sessions
- 1st: January 8 – August 4, 1997
- 2nd: January 7 – June 19, 1998
- 3rd: December 17 – 18, 1998

The 192nd New York State Legislature, consisting of the New York State Senate and the New York State Assembly, met from January 8, 1997, to December 31, 1998, during the third and fourth years of George Pataki's governorship, in Albany.

== Background ==
Under the provisions of the New York Constitution of 1938 and the U.S. Supreme Court decision to follow the One man, one vote rule, re-apportioned in 1992 by the Legislature, 61 Senators and 150 assemblymen were elected in single-seat districts for two-year terms. Senate and Assembly districts consisted of approximately the same number of inhabitants, the area being apportioned contiguously without restrictions regarding county boundaries.

At this time there were two major political parties: the Democratic Party and the Republican Party. The Reform Party, the Conservative Party, the Liberal Party, the Green Party, the Right to Life Party, the Libertarian Party, the Tax Cut Now Party, the Natural Law Party, the Workers World Party and the Socialist Workers Party also nominated tickets.

== Elections ==
The 1996 New York state election was held on November 5. No statewide elective offices were up for election. The approximate party strength at this election, as expressed by the vote for U.S. president, was: Democrats 3,650,000; Republicans 1,739,000; Reform 503,000; Conservatives 183,000; Liberals 107,000; Green 76,000; Right to Life 24,000; Libertarians 12,000; Tax Cut Now 11,000; Natural Law 5,000; Workers World 3,500; and Socialist Workers 3,000.

All 38 sitting women members of the legislature—State Senators Catherine M. Abate (Dem.), of Manhattan; Nancy Larraine Hoffmann (Dem.), of Syracuse; Olga A. Méndez (Dem.), of East Harlem; Velmanette Montgomery (Dem.), of Brooklyn; Suzi Oppenheimer (Dem.), of Mamaroneck; Mary Lou Rath (Rep.), of Williamsville; Nellie R. Santiago (Dem.), of Brooklyn; and Ada L. Smith (Dem.), of Queens; and Assemblywomen Patricia Acampora (Rep.), of Mattituck; Carmen E. Arroyo (Dem.), of the Bronx; Nancy Calhoun (Rep.), of Blooming Grove; Joan Christensen (Dem.), of Syracuse; Barbara M. Clark (Dem.), of Queens; Elizabeth Connelly (Dem.), of Staten Island; Vivian E. Cook (Dem.) of Queens; RoAnn Destito (Dem.), of Rome; Gloria Davis (Dem.), of the Bronx; Eileen C. Dugan (Dem.), of Brooklyn; Donna Ferrara (Rep.), a lawyer of Westbury; Sandy Galef (Dem.), of Ossining; Deborah J. Glick (Dem.), of Manhattan; Aurelia Greene (Dem.), of the Bronx; Audrey Hochberg (Dem.), of Scarsdale; Earlene Hill Hooper (Dem.), of Hempstead; Rhoda S. Jacobs (Dem.), of Brooklyn; Susan V. John (Dem.), of Rochester; Melinda Katz (Dem.), a lawyer of Queens; Betty Little (Rep.), of Queensbury; Naomi C. Matusow (Dem.), a lawyer of Armonk; Nettie Mayersohn (Dem.), of Queens; Debra J. Mazzarelli (Rep.), of Patchogue; Patricia McGee (Rep.), of Franklinville; Catherine Nolan (Dem.), of Queens; Chloe Ann O'Neil (Rep.), an elementary school teacher of Parishville; Audrey Pheffer (Dem.), of Queens; Frances T. Sullivan (Rep.), of Fulton; Helene Weinstein (Dem.), a lawyer of Brooklyn; and Sandra Lee Wirth (Rep.), of West Seneca—were re-elected. Ann-Margaret Carrozza (Dem.), a lawyer of Queens, was also elected to the Assembly.

Eileen C. Dugan died three days after the election. On February 18, 1997, Joan Millman (Dem.), a teacher and librarian of Brooklyn, was elected to fill the vacancy.

The 1997 New York state election was held on November 4. One vacancy in the State Senate was filled.

On February 3, 1998, Adele Cohen (Dem.), a lawyer of Brooklyn; Kate Murray (Rep.), a lawyer of Levittown; and Maureen O'Connell (Rep.), a registered nurse and lawyer of East Williston; were elected to fill vacancies in the Assembly.

On March 24, 1998, Pauline Rhodd-Cummings (Dem.), of Queens, was elected to fill a vacancy in the Assembly. Thus the 192nd Legislature ended having 43 women members, surpassing the previous record of 39 in the 190th New York State Legislature (1994).

== Sessions ==
The Legislature met for the first regular session (the 220th) at the State Capitol in Albany on January 8, 1997; and recessed indefinitely on August 4.

Sheldon Silver (Dem.) was re-elected Speaker of the Assembly.

Joseph Bruno (Rep.) was re-elected Temporary President of the Senate.

The Legislature met for the second regular session (the 221st) at the State Capitol in Albany on January 7, 1998; and recessed indefinitely on June 19.

The Assembly met again on July 29, 1998, to enact a bill on parole which had been approved by the Senate during the regular session.

The Legislature met again from December 17 to 18, 1998, to enact another piece of legislation concerning the school system of New York City, and to raise the salaries of the members of the next Legislature.

== State Senate ==
=== Senators ===
The asterisk (*) denotes members of the previous Legislature who continued in office as members of this Legislature. Assemblyman Michael Balboni was elected to fill a vacancy in the Senate.

Note: For brevity, the chairmanships omit the words "...the Committee on (the)..."

District	Senator	Party	Notes
1st	Kenneth LaValle*	Republican	
2nd	James J. Lack*	Republican	
3rd	Caesar Trunzo*	Republican	
4th	Owen H. Johnson*	Republican	
5th	Carl L. Marcellino*	Republican	
6th	Kemp Hannon*	Republican	
7th	Michael J. Tully Jr.*	Republican	died on August 5, 1997
7th	Michael Balboni*	Republican	on November 4, 1997, elected to fill vacancy
8th	Norman J. Levy*	Republican	Chairman of Transportation; died on February 7, 1998
8th	Charles J. Fuschillo Jr.	Republican	on March 24, 1998, elected to fill vacancy
9th	Dean Skelos*	Republican	
10th	Alton R. Waldon Jr.*	Democrat	
11th	Frank Padavan*	Republican	
12th	Ada L. Smith*	Democrat	
13th	Emanuel R. Gold*	Democrat	
14th	George Onorato*	Democrat	
15th	Serphin R. Maltese*	Cons./Rep.	
16th	Leonard P. Stavisky*	Democrat	
17th	Nellie R. Santiago*	Democrat	
18th	Velmanette Montgomery*	Democrat	
19th	John L. Sampson	Democrat	
20th	Marty Markowitz*	Democrat	
21st	Carl Kruger*	Democrat	
22nd	Seymour P. Lachman*	Democrat	
23rd	Vincent J. Gentile	Democrat	
24th	John J. Marchi*	Republican	
25th	Martin Connor*	Democrat	Minority Leader
26th	Roy M. Goodman*	Republican	
27th	Catherine M. Abate	Democrat	
28th	Olga A. Méndez*	Democrat	
29th	David Paterson*	Democrat	
30th	Franz S. Leichter*	Democrat	
31st	Efrain Gonzalez Jr.*	Democrat	
32nd	David Rosado	Democrat	
33rd	Larry Seabrook*	Democrat	
34th	Guy J. Velella*	Republican	
35th	Nicholas A. Spano*	Republican	
36th	Suzi Oppenheimer*	Democrat	
37th	Vincent Leibell*	Republican	
38th	Joseph R. Holland*	Republican	
39th	William J. Larkin Jr.*	Republican	
40th	Charles D. Cook*	Republican	
41st	Stephen M. Saland*	Republican	
42nd	Neil Breslin	Democrat	
43rd	Joseph Bruno*	Republican	re-elected Temporary President
44th	Hugh T. Farley*	Republican	
45th	Ronald B. Stafford*	Republican	Chairman of Finance
46th	James W. Wright*	Republican	
47th	Raymond A. Meier	Republican	
48th	Nancy Larraine Hoffmann*	Democrat	
49th	John A. DeFrancisco*	Republican	
50th	James L. Seward*	Republican	
51st	Thomas W. Libous*	Republican	
52nd	Randy Kuhl*	Republican	
53rd	Michael F. Nozzolio*	Republican	
54th	Richard A. Dollinger*	Democrat	
55th	James S. Alesi*	Republican	
56th	Jess J. Present*	Republican	died on August 8, 1998
57th	Anthony Nanula*	Democrat	
58th	William Stachowski*	Democrat	
59th	Dale M. Volker*	Republican	
60th	Mary Lou Rath*	Republican	
61st	George D. Maziarz*	Republican	

=== Employees ===
- Secretary: Stephen F. Sloan (1997)
  - Steven M. Boggess (1998)

== State Assembly ==
=== Assembly members ===
The asterisk (*) denotes members of the previous Legislature who continued in office as members of this Legislature.

Note: For brevity, the chairmanships omit the words "...the Committee on (the)..."

District	Assembly member	Party	Notes
1st	Patricia Acampora*	Republican	
2nd	Fred W. Thiele Jr.*	Republican	
3rd	Debra J. Mazzarelli*	Republican	changed party affiliation on May 14, 1997
3rd	Debra J. Mazzarelli*	Democrat	changed party affiliation on May 14, 1997
4th	Steve Englebright*	Democrat	
5th	Paul E. Harenberg*	Democrat	
6th	Robert C. Wertz*	Republican	
7th	Thomas F. Barraga*	Republican	
8th	Phil Boyle*	Republican	
9th	John J. Flanagan*	Republican	
10th	James D. Conte*	Republican	
11th	Robert K. Sweeney*	Democrat	
12th	Steven L. Labriola	Republican	
13th	David Sidikman*	Democrat	
14th	Marc Herbst*	Republican	
15th	Donna Ferrara*	Republican	
16th	Thomas DiNapoli*	Democrat	
17th	Michael Balboni*	Republican	on November 4, 1997, elected to the State Senate
17th	Maureen O'Connell	Republican	on February 3, 1998, elected to fill vacancy
18th	Earlene Hill Hooper*	Democrat	
19th	Charles J. O'Shea*	Republican	on November 4, 1997, elected to the Nassau County Board of Assessors
19th	Kate Murray	Republican	on February 3, 1998, elected to fill vacancy
20th	Harvey Weisenberg*	Democrat	
21st	Gregory R. Becker*	Republican	
22nd	Thomas Alfano*	Republican	
23rd	Audrey Pheffer*	Democrat	
24th	Mark Weprin*	Democrat	
25th	Brian M. McLaughlin*	Democrat	
26th	Ann-Margaret Carrozza	Democrat	
27th	Nettie Mayersohn*	Democrat	
28th	Melinda Katz*	Democrat	
29th	William Scarborough*	Democrat	
30th	Joseph Crowley*	Democrat	on November 3, 1998, elected to the 106th U.S. Congress
31st	Gregory W. Meeks*	Democrat	on February 3, 1998, elected to the 105th U.S. Congress
31st	Pauline Rhodd-Cummings	Democrat	on March 24, 1998, elected to fill vacancy
32nd	Vivian E. Cook*	Democrat	
33rd	Barbara M. Clark*	Democrat	
34th	Ivan C. Lafayette*	Democrat	
35th	Jeffrion L. Aubry*	Democrat	
36th	Denis J. Butler*	Democrat	
37th	Catherine Nolan*	Democrat	
38th	Anthony S. Seminerio*	Democrat	
39th	Anthony J. Genovesi*	Democrat	died on August 10, 1998
40th	Edward Griffith*	Democrat	
41st	Helene Weinstein*	Democrat	
42nd	Rhoda S. Jacobs*	Democrat	
43rd	Clarence Norman Jr.*	Democrat	
44th	James F. Brennan*	Democrat	
45th	Daniel L. Feldman*	Democrat	
46th	Jules Polonetsky*	Democrat	in December 1997, appointed as NYC Commissioner of Consumer Affairs
46th	Adele Cohen	Democrat	on February 3, 1998, elected to fill vacancy
47th	William Colton	Democrat	
48th	Dov Hikind*	Democrat	
49th	Peter J. Abbate Jr.*	Democrat	
50th	Joseph R. Lentol*	Democrat	
51st	Félix W. Ortiz*	Democrat	
52nd	vacant		Assemblywoman-elect Eileen C. Dugan died on November 8, 1996
52nd	Joan Millman	Democrat	on February 18, 1997, elected to fill vacancy
53rd	Vito J. Lopez*	Democrat	
54th	Darryl C. Towns*	Democrat	
55th	William F. Boyland*	Democrat	
56th	Albert Vann*	Democrat	
57th	Roger L. Green*	Democrat	
58th	N. Nick Perry	Democrat	
59th	Elizabeth Connelly*	Democrat	
60th	Eric N. Vitaliano*	Democrat	
61st	Robert A. Straniere*	Republican	
62nd	Sheldon Silver*	Democrat	re-elected Speaker
63rd	Steven Sanders*	Democrat	
64th	Richard N. Gottfried*	Democrat	
65th	Alexander B. Grannis*	Democrat	
66th	Deborah J. Glick*	Democrat	
67th	Scott Stringer*	Democrat	
68th	Nelson Antonio Denis	Democrat	
69th	Edward C. Sullivan*	Democrat	
70th	Keith L. T. Wright*	Democrat	
71st	Herman D. Farrell Jr.*	Democrat	Chairman of Ways and Means
72nd	Adriano Espaillat	Democrat	
73rd	John Ravitz*	Republican	
74th	Carmen E. Arroyo*	Democrat	
75th	Rubén Díaz Jr.	Democrat	
76th	Peter M. Rivera*	Democrat	
77th	Aurelia Greene*	Democrat	
78th	Roberto Ramirez*	Democrat	
79th	Gloria Davis*	Democrat	
80th	Jeffrey D. Klein*	Democrat	
81st	Jeffrey Dinowitz*	Democrat	
82nd	Stephen B. Kaufman*	Democrat	
83rd	Samuel Bea Jr.*	Democrat	
84th	J. Gary Pretlow*	Democrat	
85th	Ronald C. Tocci*	Democrat	
86th	Richard L. Brodsky*	Democrat	
87th	Mike Spano*	Republican	
88th	Audrey Hochberg*	Democrat	
89th	Naomi C. Matusow*	Democrat	
90th	Sandy Galef*	Democrat	
91st	Willis Stephens*	Republican	
92nd	Alexander J. Gromack*	Democrat	
93rd	Samuel Colman*	Democrat	
94th	Nancy Calhoun*	Republican	
95th	John Bonacic*	Republican	
96th	Thomas J. Kirwan*	Republican	
97th	Joel M. Miller*	Republican	
98th	Jacob E. Gunther III*	Democrat	
99th	Patrick R. Manning*	Republican	
100th	Robert A. D'Andrea*	Republican	
101st	John J. Guerin*	Republican	
102nd	John Faso*	Republican	Minority Leader from March 2, 1998
103rd	James Tedisco*	Republican	
104th	John McEneny*	Democrat	
105th	Paul D. Tonko*	Democrat	
106th	Ronald Canestrari*	Democrat	
107th	Robert G. Prentiss*	Republican	
108th	Pat M. Casale*	Republican	
109th	Betty Little*	Republican	
110th	Chris Ortloff*	Republican	
111th	Bill Magee*	Democrat	
112th	Chloe Ann O'Neil*	Republican	
113th	Marc W. Butler*	Republican	
114th	H. Robert Nortz*	Republican	
115th	David R. Townsend Jr.*	Republican	
116th	RoAnn Destito*	Democrat	
117th	Frances T. Sullivan*	Republican	
118th	Michael J. Bragman*	Democrat	Majority Leader
119th	Joan Christensen*	Democrat	
120th	Bernard J. Mahoney*	Republican	
121st	Harold C. Brown Jr.*	Republican	
122nd	Clifford W. Crouch*	Republican	
123rd	Jay J. Dinga*	Republican	
124th	Robert J. Warner*	Republican	
125th	Martin A. Luster*	Democrat	
126th	Daniel J. Fessenden*	Republican	
127th	George H. Winner Jr.*	Republican	
128th	Bob Oaks*	Republican	
129th	Craig J. Doran*	Republican	
130th	James Bacalles*	Republican	
131st	Susan V. John*	Democrat	
132nd	Joseph D. Morelle*	Democrat	
133rd	David F. Gantt*	Democrat	
134th	Joseph Robach*	Democrat	
135th	David Koon*	Democrat	
136th	Jerry Johnson*	Republican	
137th	Charles H. Nesbitt*	Republican	
138th	Joseph T. Pillittere*	Democrat	
139th	David E. Seaman*	Republican	
140th	Robin Schimminger*	Democrat	
141st	Arthur O. Eve*	Democrat	
142nd	Richard R. Anderson*	Republican	
143rd	Paul Tokasz*	Democrat	
144th	Sam Hoyt*	Democrat	
145th	Richard J. Keane*	Democrat	
146th	Richard A. Smith	Democrat	
147th	Thomas M. Reynolds*	Republican	Minority Leader until March 2, 1998; on November 3, 1998, elected to the 106th U.S. Congress
148th	Sandra Lee Wirth*	Republican	
149th	Patricia McGee*	Republican	
150th	William L. Parment*	Democrat	

=== Employees ===
- Clerk: Francine Misasi

== Sources ==
- Results of Voting in New York Races for the State Legislature and the Courts in The New York Times on November 7, 1996
