= Charles Nesbitt =

Charles Nesbitt may refer to:

- Charles H. Nesbitt, former Minority Leader of the New York State Assembly
- Charles R. Nesbitt, former Attorney General of Oklahoma
