= Gary Proud =

American politician

Member of the New York State Assembly from the 131st district
- In office January 1, 1977 – December 31, 1990
- Preceded by: Raymond J. Lill
- Succeeded by: Susan V. John

Personal details
- Born: July 30, 1943 (age 83) Rochester, New York
- Party: Democratic

Gary Proud (born July 30, 1943) is an American politician who served in the New York State Assembly from the 131st district from 1977 to 1990.
