= Craig M. Johnson =

American politician (born 1971)

Member of the New York State Senate from the 7th district
- In office February 6, 2007 – December 31, 2010
- Preceded by: Michael Balboni
- Succeeded by: Jack Martins

Personal details
- Born: April 21, 1971 (age 55) New York City, New York
- Party: Democratic
- Spouse: Elizabeth
- Children: 3
- Education: Amherst College; St. John's University School of Law
- Profession: lawyer, politician
- Website: NYS Senate: Craig M. Johnson

Craig M. Johnson (born April 21, 1971) is an American politician and former Democratic Party member of the New York State Senate for the 7th district.

== Education and early career ==
Johnson earned a B.A. degree (magna cum laude) from Amherst College in 1993. He earned his Juris Doctor degree (cum laude) from St. John's University School of Law in 1996. He was admitted to the New York bar in 1997. Johnson has practiced law at the law firm of Jaspan Schlesinger Hoffman LLP in Garden City, New York.

== Political career ==
Johnson was first elected to the Nassau County Legislature in May 2000, succeeding his mother Barbara Johnson who died in March 2000.

On February 6, 2007, he became the first male Democrat elected to the State Senate from North Hempstead in more than a century. He represented the 7th Senatorial District, which includes all of North Hempstead and parts of Hempstead and Oyster Bay. He chaired the Senate Investigations and Government Operations Committee.

In the November 2, 2010 general election, Mineola Mayor Jack Martins, Johnson's Republican challenger (who was also backed by the Independence and Conservative Parties), defeated Johnson by 451 votes. On December 20, 2010, New York's highest court rejected Johnson's final appeal in regard to the election results.

== Personal life ==
Johnson lives in Port Washington, New York with his wife Elizabeth and three children.

== Election results ==
- February 2007 special election, NYS Senate, 7th SD

Craig M. Johnson (DEM - WOR)	...	27,632
Maureen C. O’Connell (REP - IND - CON)	...	23,995

- November 2008 general election, NYS Senate, 7th SD

Craig M. Johnson (DEM)	...	68,172
Barbara C. Donno (REP - IND - CON)	...	52,124

- November 2010 general election, NYS Senate, 7th SD

Jack M. Martins (REP - IND - CON)	...	42,928
Craig M. Johnson (DEM)	...	42,477

== See also ==
- 2009 New York State Senate leadership crisis
- Paterson, David "Black, Blind, & In Charge: A Story of Visionary Leadership and Overcoming Adversity."Skyhorse Publishing. New York, New York, 2020

New York State Senate
Preceded by Michael Balboni	New York State Senate, 7th District; February 2007–December 2010	Succeeded by Jack Martins
Political offices
Preceded by Antoine Thompson	Ranking Minority Member of the Senate Environmental Conservation Committee; February 2007–October 2007	Succeeded by Antoine Thompson
Preceded by Andrea Stewart-Cousins	Ranking Minority Member of the Senate Local Government Committee; October 2007–December 2008	Succeeded by Betty Little
Preceded by George H. Winner, Jr.	Chairman of the Senate Committee on Investigations and Government Operations; 2009–2010	Succeeded by Carl Marcellino
