= Aurelia Greene =

American politician (1934–2021)

Member of the New York State Assembly for the 76th & 77th District
- In office 1982–2009
- Preceded by: Charles Johnson
- Succeeded by: Vanessa Gibson

Deputy Bronx Borough President
- In office 2009–2017

Personal details
- Born: Aurelia Gramie Henry; October 26, 1934 Bronx, New York, U.S.
- Died: May 8, 2021 (aged 86) Washington Heights, Manhattan, New York City, U.S
- Party: Democratic
- Spouse: Jerome Alexander Greene
- Children: 2

Aurelia Greene (October 26, 1934 – May 8, 2021) was an American politician who represented District 77 in the New York State Assembly, which comprises the Highbridge, Morrisania, and Morris Heights sections of The Bronx. She had been representing her district since 1982. She resigned in April 2009 to become Deputy Bronx Borough President. She retired in December 2017. Her death was announced on May 10, 2021. Greene died on May 8. 2021.

== In the Assembly ==
She was a member of the New York State Assembly from 1982 to 2009, sitting in the 184th, 185th, 186th, 187th, 188th, 189th, 190th, 191st, 192nd, 193rd, 194th, 195th, 196th, 197th and 198th New York State Legislatures.

Some of her positions within the Assembly included Deputy Majority Leader and Chairwoman of the Assembly Committee on Banks. She was also once the Chairwoman of the Standing Committee on Consumer Affairs & Protection and Subcommittee on Adult Education. She was the Speaker Pro Tempore and the Ranking Member of both the Education Committee and Chairwoman of the Assembly's Bronx delegation. In 2007 she broke with her party and voted against marriage equality for gay and lesbian couples.

Greene served as Deputy Borough President of the Bronx from 2009 to 2017 under Ruben Diaz Jr.

Greene was succeeded by her Chief of Staff Vanessa Gibson. Gibson in 2021, won the Democratic nomination for Bronx Borough President.

== Personal life ==
Greene was born in the Bronx and was raised on 3rd Avenue in the Morrisania neighborhood.

Greene graduated from Central Commercial High School.

Aurelia Greene supported neighborhood schooling in 1968 during the Ocean-Hill Brownsville crisis. She lived in the Bronx then.

In March 1990, Greene, along with her husband and a former Bronx school superintendent, were acquitted of criminal charges "stemming from the removal of a baby grand piano" from a public school adjacent to the house of the Greene family in 1983.

Greene endorsed Eric Adams for Mayor of New York in 2021 Democratic primary.

New York State Assembly
Preceded by Charles R. Johnson	New York State Assembly; 76th District; 1982–1992	Succeeded by Peter M. Rivera
Preceded by Roberto Ramirez	New York State Assembly; 77th District; 1993–2009	Succeeded by Vanessa Gibson
