= William R. Sears (New York politician) =

American politician (1928–1998)

William Sears

Member of the New York Senate from the 47th district
- In office 1991–1996
- Preceded by: James Donovan
- Succeeded by: Raymond Meier

Member of the New York State Assembly from the 129th district
- In office 1966–1967
- Preceded by: District Established
- Succeeded by: Joseph Finley

Member of the New York State Assembly from the 115th district
- In office 1967–1990
- Preceded by: Lawrence Corbett
- Succeeded by: David Townsend

Personal details
- Born: William R. Sears; May 25, 1928 Utica, New York, U.S.
- Died: June 26, 1998 (aged 70)
- Resting place: White Lake Cemetery
- Party: Republican
- Education: Utica College

William R. Sears (May 25, 1928 – June 26, 1998) was an American politician from New York.

== Early life and education ==
He was born on May 25, 1928, in Utica, Oneida County, New York, the son of Edward J. Sears (1904–1964) and Gladys (née Waldron) Sears (1903–1977). He attended Our Lady of Lourdes School, St. Francis de Sales High School, and Utica College.

== Career ==
He entered politics as a Republican.

He was a member of the New York State Assembly from 1966 to 1990, sitting in the 176th, 177th, 178th, 179th, 180th, 181st, 182nd, 183rd, 184th, 185th, 186th, 187th and 188th New York State Legislatures.

He was a member of the New York State Senate from 1991 to 1996, sitting in the 189th, 190th and 191st New York State Legislatures. In March 1996, he announced that he would not seek re-election later that year.

== Personal life ==
He married Anne Miller (1928–1989). They lived in Woodgate.

== Death ==
He died on June 26, 1998, in a motor vehicle accident on Bear Creek Road in Woodgate, near the railroad tracks, and was buried at the White Lake Cemetery in Woodgate.

New York State Assembly
Preceded by new district	New York State Assembly; 129th District; 1966	Succeeded by Joseph C. Finley
Preceded by Lawrence E. Corbett, Jr.	New York State Assembly; 115th District; 1967–1990	Succeeded by David R. Townsend Jr.
New York State Senate
Preceded by James H. Donovan	New York State Senate; 47th District; 1991–1996	Succeeded by Raymond A. Meier
