= George Onorato =

American politician (1928–2015)

Member of the New York State Senate
- In office June 28, 1983 – December 31, 2010
- Preceded by: Anthony V. Gazzara
- Succeeded by: Michael N. Gianaris
- Constituency: 14th district (1983–2002); 12th district (2003–2010)

Personal details
- Born: November 5, 1928 Astoria, New York, U.S.
- Died: February 21, 2015 (aged 86) East Elmhurst, New York, U.S.
- Party: Democratic
- Spouse: Athena Georgakakos
- Children: 3

Military service
- Allegiance: United States
- Branch/service: United States Army
- Years of service: 1950–1952
- Unit: 118th Medical Battalion

George Onorato (November 5, 1928 – February 21, 2015) was an American politician from New York.

== Early life ==
Onorato was born on November 5, 1928, in Astoria, Queens, New York City. He graduated from Long Island City High School. He served in the 118th Medical Battalion of the U.S. Army from 1950 to 1952.

== Career ==
He was Secretary and Treasurer of Local 41 of the International Union of Bricklayers and Allied Craftworkers for 15 years, and entered politics as a Democrat.

On June 28, 1983, he was elected to the New York State Senate, to fill the vacancy caused by the appointment of Anthony V. Gazzara as Chairman of the New York State Liquor Authority. Onorato was re-elected several times, and remained in the State Senate until 2010, sitting in the 185th, 186th, 187th, 188th, 189th, 190th, 191st, 192nd, 193rd, 194th, 195th, 196th, 197th and 198th New York State Legislatures.

He was Vice Chair of the Minority Conference, Co-chair of the New York State Armed Forces Legislative Caucus, and Co-Chairman of the New York State Senate Democratic Task Force on Energy & Conservation. He generally opposes same-sex marriage legislation. He is a member of New York State Senate Democratic Puerto Rican and Hispanic Task Force, the Senate Minority Task Force on Vietnam Veterans, and the Senate Minority Task Force on Waterfront Development.

In 1998, Onorato was challenged by Progressive Democrat Ed Sedarbaum. Onorato got re-elected to The New York State Senate on Election Day 2009.

On December 2, 2009, Onorato voted against same-sex marriage legislation, which failed to pass the Senate.

Onorato announced on January 11, 2010, that he would not be a candidate for re-election.

== Personal life and death ==
He married Athena Georgakakos, and they had three children.

He died on February 21, 2015, in East Elmhurst, Queens.

New York State Senate
Preceded by Anthony V. Gazzara	New York State Senate; 14th district 1983–2002	Succeeded by Malcolm Smith
Preceded by Ada L. Smith	New York State Senate; 12th district 2003–2010	Succeeded by Michael N. Gianaris
Preceded by Joseph Robach	New York State Senate; Chairman of the Committee on Labor; 2009–2010	Succeeded by Joseph Robach
