= Donna Ferrara =

American politician

Donna Ferrara (born June 22, 1959) is an American lawyer and politician from New York.

== Life ==
She was born on June 22, 1959. She graduated B.A. in English from SUNY Albany in 1981, and J.D. from St. John's University School of Law in 1984. She married Robert Gregory, and they have two children. They live in Westbury, Nassau County, New York.

She entered politics as a Republican, and was an aide to State Senator Norman J. Levy, and later legislative counsel to Assemblyman Kemp Hannon.

She was a member of the New York State Assembly from 1993 to 2005, sitting in the 190th, 191st, 192nd, 193rd, 194th, 195th and 196th New York State Legislatures. In April 2005, she was appointed to the New York State Workers Compensation Board. She was Chairwoman of the Board from 2006 to 2007, and remained on the Board until July 2013.

New York State Assembly
Preceded by Daniel Frisa	New York State Assembly; 15th District; 1993–2005	Succeeded by Rob Walker
