= Owen H. Johnson =

American politician

Member of the New York State Senate from the 4th district
- In office January 3, 1973 – December 31, 2012
- Preceded by: George A. Murphy
- Succeeded by: Philip M. Boyle

Personal details
- Born: July 3, 1929 West Babylon, New York, U.S.
- Died: December 24, 2014 (aged 85) West Babylon, New York, U.S.
- Party: Republican
- Children: 2
- Education: Hofstra University (BA)

Military service
- Branch/service: United States Marine Corps
- Years of service: 1946–1948

Owen H. Johnson (July 3, 1929 – December 24, 2014) was an American politician who served as a longtime member of the New York State Senate. He represented the 4th State Senate district, which includes mostly the Town of Babylon in south-west Suffolk County.

== Early life and education ==
Johnson attended elementary school in West Babylon and high school in Babylon. He served in the United States Marine Corps from 1946 to 1948. After being honorably discharged, Johnson attended Hofstra College and graduated in 1956 with a B.A. in history and political science. In 1998, Hofstra awarded him an Honorary Doctor of Laws degree.

== Career ==
He was a member of the New York State Senate from 1973 to 2012, sitting in the 180th, 181st, 182nd, 183rd, 184th, 185th, 186th, 187th, 188th, 189th, 190th, 191st, 192nd, 193rd, 194th, 195th, 196th, 197th, 198th and 199th New York State Legislatures. He was the co-chairman and later Chairman Emeritus on the board of directors of the American Legislative Exchange Council (ALEC), a national association of legislators.

In 2011, Johnson voted against allowing same-sex marriage in New York during a Senate roll-call vote on the Marriage Equality Act, which passed after a close 33-29 vote. He did not seek reelection in the 2012 state elections.

== Personal life ==
Johnson and his wife Christel resided in West Babylon. They had two children: a son, Owen, and daughter, Chirsten.

Johnson died on December 24, 2014.

== See also ==
- 2009 New York State Senate leadership crisis

New York State Senate
Preceded by George A. Murphy	New York State Senate; 4th District; 1973–2012	Succeeded by Philip M. Boyle
