= John D. Caemmerer =

American politician

Member of the New York State Senate
- In office January 1, 1966 – February 7, 1982
- Preceded by: Thomas A. Duffy
- Succeeded by: Michael J. Tully Jr.
- Constituency: 8th district (1966); 5th district (1967-1972); 7th district (1973-1982)

Personal details
- Born: January 19, 1928 Brooklyn, New York
- Died: February 7, 1982 (aged 54) Manhattan, New York
- Party: Republican
- Education: Notre Dame University, St. John's Law School

John D. Caemmerer (January 19, 1928 – February 7, 1982) was a New York lawyer and politician.

== Life ==
John Caemmerer was born in Brooklyn, and grew up in the incorporated village of Williston Park, Nassau County, New York. He was educated in local public schools prior to attending Xavier High School in Manhattan and later Notre Dame University and St. John's Law School. Caemmerer was Deputy Town Attorney for the Town of North Hempstead and Village Attorney for Williston Park. Both before and after being elected to the New York State Senate Caemmerer was a principal in the law firms, Pratt, Caemmerer, & Cleary and later Farrell, Fritz, Caemmerer, Cleary, Barnosky, & Armentano. During this time Caemmerer served as a local Republican Leader, and was North Hempstead Republican Committee Chairman from 1966 to 1972.

Caemmerer was a member of the New York State Senate from 1966 until his death in 1982, sitting in the 176th, 177th, 178th, 179th, 180th, 181st, 182nd, 183rd and 184th New York State Legislatures. He was Chairman of the Committee on Villages and Local Government until 1972 and, after the death of Edward J. Speno, became Chairman of the Committee on Transportation. Caemmerer worked to increase penalties on drunk drivers while lowering the maximum allowable blood alcohol content from .15 to eventually .10 in New York State. Caemmerer was also one of the first New York State Legislators to propose a mandatory seatbelt law in the state. Caemmerer was also involved in the first MTA capital plan for New York State. Many in the Senate feel that Caemmerer's crowning achievement was the passage of the child seat law in 1981.

He died on February 7, 1982, in Memorial Sloan Kettering Cancer Center in Manhattan, of cancer.

The Long Island Rail Road's West Side Yard was officially named the John D. Caemmerer West Side Yard because Caemmerer obtained funding to construct the facility. Ironically, Caemmerer's 17 year-old daughter, Kathleen Caemmerer, was the sole survivor of a tragic 1982 Long Island Rail Road accident. Caemmerer's daughter was a passenger in the van struck by a train traveling about 60 miles per hour (97 km/h). The 1981 Ford Econoline carried ten teenagers, and apparently drove around a flashing railroad crossing gate when the train was not able to stop in time. 37 years later, responding to the 2019 Westbury train collision, Kathleen Caemmerer cautioned people to not forget what happened to her, revealing she still required the use of crutches due to the injuries she sustained.

== Sources ==
New York State Senate
| Preceded by Thomas A. Duffy | New York State Senate; 8th District; 1966 | Succeeded by Murray Schwartz |
| Preceded by Edward J. Speno | New York State Senate; 5th District; 1967–1972 | Succeeded by Ralph J. Marino |
| Preceded by Norman J. Levy | New York State Senate; 7th District; 1973–1982 | Succeeded by Michael J. Tully Jr. |
