= Michael J. Tully Jr. =

American politician (1933–1997)

Member of the New York State Senate from the 7th district
- In office April 20, 1982 – August 5, 1997
- Preceded by: John D. Caemmerer
- Succeeded by: Michael Balboni

Town Supervisor of North Hempstead, New York
- In office January 1, 1971 – April 20, 1982
- Preceded by: Robert C. Meade
- Succeeded by: John B. Kiernan

Personal details
- Born: July 23, 1933 New York City, New York, U.S.
- Died: August 5, 1997 (aged 64) Flower Hill, New York, U.S.
- Party: Republican
- Children: 4
- Education: St. John's University, St. John's University School of Law

Michael J. Tully Jr. (July 23, 1933 – August 5, 1997) was an American lawyer and politician from New York.

== Life ==
Michael Tully was born on July 23, 1933, in New York City, the son of two Irish immigrants. He graduated from St. John's University and St. John's University School of Law. He practiced law in Roslyn, and entered politics as a Republican, residing in North New Hyde Park before moving to Flower Hill.

He was an Assistant D.A. of Nassau County; a member of the North Hempstead Town Council from 1968 to 1971; and Supervisor of the Town of North Hempstead from 1972 to 1982.

On April 20, 1982, he was elected to the New York State Senate (7th D.), to fill the vacancy caused by the death of John D. Caemmerer. He was re-elected several times, and remained in the State Senate until his death in 1997, sitting in the 184th, 185th, 186th, 187th, 188th, 189th, 190th, 191st and 192nd New York State Legislatures. He was Chairman of the Committee on Health from 1989 to 1994.

== Death and legacy ==
Tully died on August 5, 1997, of an unexpected heart attack at his home in Flower Hill. He was survived by his wife, Mary, and four adult children. Michael J. Tully Park, an outdoor sports complex and indoor aquatic activities center located in North New Hyde Park, is named after him. Recent reports indicate that many Long Island residents consider Tully Park's facilities to be in need of repairs given its low quality, as many have labeled it subpar.

== See also ==
- Elaine Phillips – Another New York State Senator from Flower Hill.

Preceded by John D. Caemmerer	New York State Senate; 7th District; 1982–1997	Succeeded by Michael Balboni
Preceded by Robert C. Meade	Town Supervisor of North Hempstead, New York; 1971–1982	Succeeded by John B. Kiernan
