= Michael Balboni =

American lawyer and politician

Member of the New York Senate from the 7th district
- In office November 5, 1997 – December 25, 2006
- Preceded by: Michael J. Tully Jr.
- Succeeded by: Craig M. Johnson

Member of the New York State Assembly from the 17th district
- In office 1990–1997
- Preceded by: Kemp Hannon
- Succeeded by: Maureen O'Connell

Personal details
- Born: May 12, 1959 (age 67) Long Island, New York
- Party: Republican
- Education: Adelphi University; St. John's Law School
- Profession: lawyer, politician

Michael Balboni (born May 12, 1959) is the President of Adelphi University, a former politician and lawyer from New York. He was a member of the State Assembly, the State Senate, and Deputy Secretary for Public Safety of the State of New York. He will serve as Adelphi University’s 11th president and will officially begin his presidency on June 1, 2026.

== Political career ==
Balboni entered politics as a Republican. On February 20, 1990, he was elected to the New York State Assembly, to fill the vacancy caused by the election of Kemp Hannon to the State Senate. Balboni was re-elected four times and remained in the Assembly until 1997, sitting in the 188th, 189th, 190th, 191st and 192nd New York State Legislatures. In November 1997, he was elected to the New York State Senate, to fill the vacancy caused by the death of Michael J. Tully Jr. Balboni was re-elected several times and remained in the Senate until 2006, sitting in the 192nd, 193rd, 194th, 195th and 196th New York State Legislatures. As chairman of the Senate Committee on Veterans, Homeland Security and Military Affairs, he spoke out for New York's need to receive additional Homeland Security funds.

Because of his reputation for garnering support across party lines, it was rumored that he would seek the Republican nomination for Attorney General in 2006. That would have opened his competitive, strongly probably Democratic-leaning, district to a threat from the Democrats. He chose not to run after pressure from Senate Republican Leader Joseph Bruno, to help the Republican Party retain its slim majority in the State Senate. Balboni was re-elected in 2006, winning 56% of the votes.

On December 26, 2006, New York State Governor-elect Spitzer announced that Balboni would be appointed Deputy Secretary for Public Safety, requiring Balboni to resign his Senate seat. The move triggered a special election on February 6, 2007. For political reasons, Balboni sided with the Democrats, and refused to endorse the Republican candidate, former friend and colleague Nassau County Clerk Maureen O'Connell, who lost the election to Democratic Nassau County Legislator Craig M. Johnson.

In his role as head of the NYS Office of Public Safety, Balboni oversaw homeland security and criminal justice agencies for Spitzer. These include the State Police, Department of Corrections, Division of Criminal Justice Services, the Division of Parole, and Office of Homeland Security. He coordinated homeland security and law enforcement policy, and served as state liaison to the U.S. Department of Homeland Security.

In January, 2009, Balboni announced he would be leaving the Paterson administration to work in the private sector as a partner with Navigators Global, a government relations and communications consulting firm.

In September, 2009, Balboni started Greater New York Health Care Facilities which is a non-profit trade association serving the needs of the long term care community in the greater New York metropolitan area and beyond, while currently serving as the Executive Director.

In August 2010, Balboni left his position at Navigators Global to join Cardinal Point Strategies as a Principle and Senior Vice President in their Government Solutions Group

In August 2012, Balboni became the Founder of RedLand Strategies, a consulting firm which sits at the intersection of Public Safety, Government Relations, Media Management and Business Development. Balboni currently serves as President and Managing Director.

== Adelphi University ==
In 2026 Balboni was named as the 11th President of Adelphi University in Garden City, New York. The first Adelphi alumnus and the first Long Island native to serve as its president. He had graduated cum laude from Adelphi in 1981 with a degree in biology. He had previously been an adjunct faculty member and chair of the board of trustees.

New York State Assembly
Preceded by Kemp Hannon	New York State Assembly; 17th District; 1990–1997	Succeeded by Maureen O'Connell
New York State Senate
Preceded by Michael J. Tully Jr.	New York State Senate; 7th District; 1998–2006	Succeeded by Craig M. Johnson
