= David R. Townsend Jr. =

American politician (born 1943)

David Townsend

Member of the New York State Assembly from the 115th district
- In office January 1, 1991 – January 1, 2010
- Preceded by: William Sears
- Succeeded by: Claudia Tenney

Personal details
- Born: David R. Townsend Jr. April 14, 1943 (age 83) Rome, New York, U.S.
- Party: Republican
- Education: State University of New York (Morrisville)

David R. Townsend Jr. (born April 14, 1943) is an American Politician from New York.

== Biography ==
He was born on April 14, 1943, in Rome, Oneida County, New York. He attended SUNY Morrisville. From 1966 to 1990, he worked as a police officer for different law enforcement agencies in Oneida County.

He entered politics as a Republican, and was a member of the New York State Assembly from 1991 to 2010, sitting in the 189th, 190th, 191st, 192nd, 193rd, 194th, 195th, 196th, 197th and 198th New York State Legislatures. He represented the 115th district and later, the 101st district of the New York State Assembly.

He didn't seek re-election in 2010, instead running for Sheriff of Oneida County, but he was narrowly defeated by Democrat Robert Maciol.

Townsend was succeeded by Republican Claudia Tenney as representative of the 101st district.

New York State Assembly
Preceded by William R. Sears	Member of the New York State Assembly from the 115th district 1991–2010	Succeeded by Claudia Tenney
