= David Sidikman =

American politician

David S. Sidikman (born July 1, 1934) is an American lawyer and politician from New York.

== Biography ==
He was born on July 1, 1934, in Brooklyn, New York City. He attended Abraham Lincoln High School. He graduated B.A. from Lehigh University in 1955; and J.D. from New York University School of Law in 1958. He was admitted to the bar, and practiced law in Old Bethpage, Nassau County, New York. Later he also entered politics as a Democrat.

On February 18, 1992, Sidikman elected to the New York State Assembly (13th D.), to fill the vacancy caused by the election of Lewis J. Yevoli as Supervisor of the Town of Oyster Bay. He was re-elected six times and remained in the Assembly until 2004, sitting in the 189th, 190th, 191st, 192nd, 193rd, 194th and 195th New York State Legislatures. In September 2004, he ran in the Democratic primary for re-nomination, but was defeated by Charles D. Lavine.

New York State Assembly
Preceded by Lewis J. Yevoli	New York State Assembly; 13th District; 1992–2004	Succeeded by Charles D. Lavine
