= Dale M. Volker =

American politician

Member of the New York State Senate
- In office February 4, 1975 – December 31, 2010
- Preceded by: Thomas F. McGowan
- Succeeded by: Patrick M. Gallivan
- Constituency: 58th district (1975–1982); 59th district (1983–2010)

Member of the New York State Assembly from the 148th District
- In office 1973–1974
- Preceded by: Frank Walkley
- Succeeded by: Vincent J. Graber, Sr.

Dale M. Volker (born August 2, 1940) is a former New York State Senator who represented the 59th district, which then covered Wyoming County, as well as portions of Erie, Livingston and Ontario counties. Volker is a Republican.

== Biography ==
Dale Volker was born on August 2, 1940, the son of Assemblyman Julius Volker. He graduated from Canisius College and University at Buffalo Law School. During his time in law school, he was the president of the Student Bar Association. As such, he was instrumental in advocating for the school to grant a juris doctor (J.D.) rather than bachelor of laws (L.L.B.). He then worked for the Depew Police Department.

Volker was a member of the New York State Assembly in 1973 and 1974. In November 1974, he ran for re-election, but was defeated by Democrat Vincent J. Graber, Sr.

On February 4, 1975, Volker was elected to the New York State Senate, to fill the vacancy caused by the resignation of Thomas F. McGowan. Volker was re-elected several times and remained in the State Senate until 2010, sitting in the 181st, 182nd, 183rd, 184th, 185th, 186th, 187th, 188th, 189th, 190th, 191st, 192nd, 193rd, 194th, 195th, 196th, 197th and 198th New York State Legislatures.

Volker served on the Codes Committee and was the "Chairman" of the Western New York Delegation, a member of the Senate Subcommittee on Alcoholism, and a member of the Senate Public Protection Subcommittee. Prior to 1987 he was Chairman of the Senate Standing Committee on Energy. His other committee assignments included the Senate Standing Committees on Banks, Cities, Crime Victims, Crime and Corrections, Finance, Judiciary, Mental Health and Developmental Disabilities and Rules. Volker was also a member of the American Legislative Exchange Council (ALEC).

An April 26, 2007 article in the Times Union, noted that Volker was a vocal opponent of Rockefeller drug law reform in the state. Volker helped put the original Rockefeller laws in place as a way of combating the commutation of drug sentences by downstate, and particularly NYC circuit judges. Gabriel Sayegh, author of the piece and project director of New York City's Drug Policy Alliance office, explained that Volker's district benefited heavily from the state's prison industrial complex.

On April 30, 2010, Volker announced that he would not run for re-election.

New York State Assembly
Preceded by Frank Walkley	New York State Assembly; 148th District; 1973–1974	Succeeded by Vincent J. Graber Sr.
New York State Senate
Preceded by Thomas F. McGowan	New York State Senate; 58th District; 1975–1982	Succeeded by Anthony M. Masiello
Preceded by Walter J. Floss Jr.	New York State Senate; 59th District; 1983–2010	Succeeded by Patrick M. Gallivan
