= Paul Tokasz =

American politician

Member of the New York State Assembly for the 143rd District
- In office 1988–2006
- Preceded by: Dennis T. Gorski
- Succeeded by: Dennis Gabryszak

Personal details
- Born: 1946 (age 79–80)
- Education: Buffalo State College

Paul Tokasz (born 1946) is an American politician from New York. He represented District 143 which comprises the towns of Lancaster, and Cheektowaga, and villages of Depew, Lancaster and Sloan, from 1988 to 2006.

== Biography ==
He was born in 1946, of Polish ancestry. He graduated B.A. in history from Hobart College in 1968, and M.A. in education from Buffalo State College. He taught school at public schools in Buffalo, New York, from 1968 to 1977.

He entered politics as a Democrat, and was Clerk of the Erie County Legislature in 1977; Deputy County Clerk (in charge of the Auto Bureau) of Erie County from 1977 to 1986; and First Deputy County Clerk from 1987 to 1988.

On March 15, 1988, Tokasz was elected to the New York State Assembly, to fill the vacancy caused by the election of Dennis T. Gorski as Erie County Executive. Tokasz was re-elected several times and remained in the Assembly until 2006, sitting in the 187th, 188th, 189th, 190th, 191st, 192nd, 193rd, 194th, 195th and 196th New York State Legislatures. He was Majority Leader from 2001 to 2006. In July 2006, he announced that he would not seek re-election later that year. to become a lobbyist.

He lives in Cheektowaga.

New York State Assembly
Preceded by Dennis T. Gorski	New York State Assembly; 143rd District; 1988–2006	Succeeded by Dennis Gabryszak
Political offices
Preceded by Michael J. Bragman	Majority Leader of the New York State Assembly; 2001–2006	Succeeded by Ronald Canestrari
