= Thomas F. Barraga =

American politician

Thomas Barraga

Member of the Suffolk County Legislature from the 11th district
- In office January 2006 – January 2018
- Preceded by: Angie Carpenter
- Succeeded by: Steven J. Flotteron

Member of the New York State Assembly from the 7th, later the 8th district
- In office January 1983 – December 2005
- Preceded by: John J. Flanagan Sr.
- Succeeded by: Philip Boyle

Personal details
- Born: Thomas F. Barraga; April 23, 1943 (age 83) Brooklyn, New York
- Party: Republican
- Spouse: Joanne
- Children: Two
- Education: St. John's University (BBA); Long Island University (MBA); Columbia Pacific University (Ph.D.)
- Profession: Politician
- Website: Official website

Thomas F. "Tom" Barraga (born April 23, 1943) is a member of the Suffolk County Legislature in New York, representing the 11th Legislative District, which includes West Islip, Bay Shore, Fire Island, and parts of Brentwood. He was a member of the New York State Assembly for 23 years.

== Biography ==
Barraga was raised on Long Island, attended St. Joseph's Elementary School in Babylon and graduated from St. Anthony's High School in Smithtown. He received a BBA degree in marketing from St. John's University in 1964. Barraga served six years in the U.S. Marine Corps Reserve, receiving an honorable discharge in 1966. He earned an M.B.A. from Long Island University in 1972 and a Ph.D. as a Doctorate of Philosophy, Business and Public Administration from Columbia Pacific University in 1981.

Barraga began working in the private sector, and held positions with the American Can Company, Dun & Bradstreet, and Pfizer. He entered politics in 1977, serving as Town Clerk for the Town of Islip. He was a member of the New York State Assembly from 1983 to 2005, sitting in the 185th, 186th, 187th, 188th, 189th, 190th, 191st, 192nd, 193rd, 194th, 195th and 196th New York State Legislatures. On November 8, 2005, he was elected in the 11th Legislative District to the Suffolk County Legislature.

Barraga resides in West Islip. He and his wife Joanne (née Kurtz) have two daughters. He is a member of Our Lady of Lourdes Roman Catholic Church in West Islip, the Sons of Italy, and the American Legion. He used to be vice-chairman of the board of trustees at Suffolk Community College.

== Controversy ==
On January 29, 2014, Barraga wrote a letter to a young constituent whose mother was struck by a car that made an illegal left-turn, seriously injuring her, while she was riding a bicycle in Babylon. Barraga advised that he felt, "no one... who lives in Suffolk County should ever ride a bicycle or motorcycle." Barraga wrote that additional signage and/or bike lanes would do little to solve the problem, as motorists would ignore signs. "Reality at times can be difficult for some to come to grips with but giving false hope would be inappropriate."

New York State Assembly
Preceded by John J. Flanagan, Sr.	New York State Assembly; 7th District; 1983–2002	Succeeded by Michael J. Fitzpatrick
Preceded by Philip Boyle	New York State Assembly; 8th District; 2003–2005	Succeeded by Philip Boyle
