= Philip B. Healey =

American politician (1921–1996)

Phillip B. Healey

Member of the New York State Assembly
- In office January 1, 1971 – May 27, 1996
- Preceded by: Francis P. McCloskey
- Succeeded by: Steven L. Labriola
- Constituency: 9th district (1971-1972); 11th district (1973-1982); 12th district (1983-1996)

Personal details
- Born: August 21, 1921 Brooklyn, New York
- Died: May 27, 1996 (aged 74) Massapequa, New York
- Party: Republican

Philip B. Healey (August 21, 1921 – May 27, 1996) was an American politician and veteran from New York.

== Biography and career ==
Healey was born on August 21, 1921, in Brooklyn, New York City. He served in the U.S. Air Force. He graduated with a B.B.A. from St. John's University in 1951. He graduated with an M.B.A. from LIU Post in 1968.

He entered politics as a Republican, and was a member of the Oyster Bay Town Council. He was a member of the New York State Assembly from 1971 until his death in 1996, sitting in the 179th, 180th, 181st, 182nd, 183rd, 184th, 185th, 186th, 187th, 188th, 189th, 190th and 191st New York State Legislatures.

He died on May 27, 1996, at the Massapequa General Hospital, of a heart attack.

=== Legacy ===
The Philip B. Healey Beach at Florence Avenue, Massapequa, was named in his honor. Additionally, the Bethpage State Parkway was ceremoniously named the Philip B. Healey Memorial Parkway, in his honor.

== Personal life ==
In 1953, Healey married Geneva Musalo, and they had three children. They lived in Massapequa, in Nassau County, on Long Island, New York.

New York State Assembly
Preceded by Francis P. McCloskey	New York State Assembly; 9th District; 1971–1972	Succeeded by William L. Burns
Preceded by Stanley Harwood	New York State Assembly; 11th District; 1973–1982	Succeeded by Patrick G. Halpin
Preceded by Frederick E. Parola	New York State Assembly; 12th District; 1983–1996	Succeeded by Steven L. Labriola
