= Louis Mosiello =

American politician

Louis Mosiello was a Republican member of the New York State Assembly representing Yonkers. He was elected in 2004. He was previously elected five times to the Westchester County Board of Legislators.

Political offices
Preceded by Daniel P. Thomas	Member of the Westchester County Board of Legislators from the 15th district 1996–2004	Succeeded by Gordon A. Burrows
New York State Assembly
Preceded by Mike Spano	Member of the New York State Assembly from the 93rd district 2005–2006	Succeeded by Mike Spano
