= Rob Walker (New York politician) =

American politician

Chief Deputy County Executive of Nassau County, New York
- In office January 2010 – January 2018
- Preceded by: Christopher Hahn
- Succeeded by: Helena Williams

Member of the New York State Assembly from the 15th district
- In office May 2005 – December 2009
- Preceded by: Donna Ferrara
- Succeeded by: Michael A. Montesano

Personal details
- Born: Richard Robinson Walker; 1974 or 1975 (age 50–51)
- Party: Republican
- Profession: politician

Richard Robinson "Rob" Walker (born 1974/1975) was the Chief Deputy County Executive of Nassau County, New York from January 2010 until January 2018 shortly before his arrest in February. He was previously a Republican member of the New York State Assembly representing the 15th Assembly District, which includes parts of central Nassau County including Hicksville, Westbury and Syosset.

== Political career ==
Walker had started out as a summer intern for then Nassau County Legislator Ed Mangano. He moved on to become the assistant to Town of Oyster Bay Supervisor John Venditto and Director of Traffic Safety and Constituent Services. He then went on to become the Deputy Commissioner of Parks for the Town of Oyster Bay. He was a major force behind the Save Environmental Assets Fund Committee.

Walker was then elected to the State Assembly. He was first elected after a special election held on May 24, 2005. He was then reelected in November 2006 and 2008. In the Assembly, he was the Vice Chair of the Steering Committee, Ranking Member of the Assembly Tourism, Parks, Arts & Sports Development Committee and the Assembly Standing Committees on Aging, Election Law, Energy, Labor, and member of the Assembly Sub Committee on Renewable Energy and the Joint Budget Conference Committee on Education. He served as the Chairman of the RemaiNY Young New Yorkers task force, as well as the Medicaid Fraud task force, Waste and Abuse task force, Safer Communities task force and successful schools task force.

When Ed Mangano decided to run against Tom Suozzi as Nassau County Executive in 2009, Walker acted as Mangano's Campaign Manager. After Mangano won the election, he became Mangano's Chief Deputy County Executive.

In February 2018 Walker was arrested on charges of lying to the FBI, obstruction, and corruption. He put up his house in Hicksville and was released on $200,000 bail. He initially pleaded not guilty but ultimately pleaded guilty in May 2019. He originally had been due to be sentenced March 17, 2020, but due the pandemic, his sentencing was delayed to December 7, 2021 where he was sentenced to 18 months in federal prison. As part of his sentence, he was also require to pay a $5,500 fine, pay $5,000 in forfeiture, and perform up to 2,000 hours of community service. He was later reported to FCI Fort Dix on February 7, 2022 where he began his sentence.

== Family ==
Walker is a lifelong resident of Hicksville, New York, where he resides with his wife Elizabeth.

His mother, Rose Marie Walker was councilwoman on the Town of Oyster Bay's Town Board, but left that position to take Ed Mangano's old seat in the Nassau County Legislature.

== Election results ==
- May 2005 special election, NYS Assembly, 15th AD

Rob Walker (REP - CON)	...	2,040
Kathleen Magin Arreco (DEM)	...	471

- November 2006 general election, NYS Assembly, 1st AD

Rob Walker (REP - IND - CON - WOR)	...	19,294
Matthew G. Pangburn (DEM)	...	13,368

- November 2008 general election, NYS Assembly, 1st AD

Rob Walker (REP - IND - CON - WOR)	...	30,528
Stephanie G. Ovadia (DEM)	...	20,272

New York State Assembly
Preceded by Donna Ferrara	New York State Assembly, 15th District; 2005–2009	Succeeded by Michael Montesano
