= Ronald C. Tocci =

American politician (born 1941)

Ronald C. Tocci (born April 19, 1941) is a former American politician from New York.

A native and resident of New Rochelle, New York, he was a Democratic member of the New York State Assembly from 1985 to 2004, sitting in the 186th through 195th New York State Legislatures.

A member of the State Assembly's Ways and Means Committee, Tocci was the proponent of reinstating the Stock Transfer Tax, a mode of taxation which was in effect from 1907 to 1981 in the state of New York, home to the nation's most important stock exchanges, and which produced over $300 million annually in revenues to the state and the city of New York.

In 2002, Tocci was defeated in the Democratic primary by Noam Bramson. Tocci then ran on the Republican ticket in the general election, and defeated Bramson. However, Tocci remained a registered Democrat and sat with the Democrats during his last term.

New York State Assembly
Preceded by John M. Perone	New York State Assembly; 85th District; 1985–2002	Succeeded by Rubén Díaz Jr.
Preceded by Willis Stephens	New York State Assembly; 91st District; 2003–2004	Succeeded by George S. Latimer
