= George H. Winner Jr. =

American politician

George Winner

Member of the New York Senate from the 53rd district
- In office January 1, 2005 – December 31, 2010
- Preceded by: Randy Kuhl
- Succeeded by: Tom O'Mara

Member of the New York State Assembly from the 126th, then the 127th, and the 137th district
- In office January 1, 1979 – December 31, 2004
- Preceded by: L. Richard Marshall
- Succeeded by: Tom O'Mara

Personal details
- Born: July 31, 1949 (age 76) Elmira, New York, U.S.
- Party: Republican
- Spouse: Lynn Hardman
- Children: 3
- Occupation: Lawyer

George H. Winner Jr. (born July 31, 1949) is a former New York state senator. A Republican, he served in the New York State Senate from 2005 to 2010, after having spent 13 terms in the New York State Assembly.

== Political career and background ==
Born in Elmira, New York, George Winner is a 1971 graduate of St. Lawrence University. He was admitted to the practice of law in New York in 1977. He is a partner in the Elmira law firm of Keyser, Maloney, Winner LLP and is a member of the Chemung County, New York and New York State Bar Associations. Winner was counsel and legislative assistant to Senate Deputy Majority Leader William T. Smith from 1971 to 1978. He is married to the former Lynn Hardman, and they have three daughters.

He was a member of the New York State Assembly from 1979 to 2004, sitting in the 183rd, 184th, 185th, 186th, 187th, 188th, 189th, 190th, 191st, 192nd, 193rd, 194th and 195th New York State Legislatures.

He was a member of the New York State Senate from 2005 to 2010, sitting in the 196th, 197th and 198th New York State Legislatures. He represented the 53rd senatorial district which comprised Chemung, Schuyler, Steuben and Yates counties, the city and town of Ithaca, New York, and the towns of Enfield, Newfield and Ulysses in Tompkins County. He served as Chairman of the Committee on Investigations and Government Operations.

Winner, who received statewide attention after leading a Senate investigation of the Spitzer administration in 2007, considered running for New York State Attorney General in 2010. He was also mentioned as a potential candidate to run against Eric Massa for the United States House of Representatives seat representing New York's 29th congressional district in 2010.

Winner unexpectedly announced his retirement from the state senate on June 2, 2010. Since his retirement, he has operated the Rescue New York political action committee.

== Notes ==
New York State Assembly
Preceded by L. Richard Marshall	New York State Assembly; 126th District; 1979–1992	Succeeded by Daniel J. Fessenden
Preceded by Donald R. Davidsen	New York State Assembly; 127th District; 1993–2002	Succeeded by Daniel L. Hooker
Preceded by Charles H. Nesbitt	New York State Assembly; 137th District; 2003–2004	Succeeded by Tom O'Mara
New York State Senate
Preceded by Randy Kuhl	New York State Senate; 53rd District; 2005–2010	Succeeded by Tom O'Mara
