= Stephen B. Kaufman =

American politician

Stephen B. Kaufman (born August 29, 1944) is a lawyer and former Democratic City Councilman and New York State Assemblyman from his native Bronx. In 2004, he ran unsuccessfully for the New York State Senate.

== Criticized by New York Courts for "Duplicitous Conduct" in 1978 ==
The New York Supreme Court (Appellate Division) summarized Kaufman's fraud in this way:

In the early summer of 1975, it had been discovered that New York City Councilman, Stephen Kaufman, had deceived the residents of Co-op City by his duplicitous conduct involving the rent strike. He was the only elected public official living in Co-op City but he became unelectable because of his rent strike duplicity. His actions were defended by the regular Democratic Club leadership in the district who were, at best, considered lukewarm in their support of the rent strike. There were regular and reform factions splitting the democratic support outside of Co-op City in the summer, fall and early winter months of 1975-76.

The opinion criticizing Kaufman was authored by Justice Ann T. Mikoll, and it was signed by three other justices (Presiding Justice Greenblott, Justice Larkin, and Justice Herlihy). Another member of the court, Justice Kane, concurred, but only in the result.

== Campaign Finance Scandal, 2005-2009 ==
In April 2008, the New York City Campaign Finance Board found that Kaufman's campaign "violated the campaign finance program spending limit during the 2005 primary election campaign." The Board fined Kaufman and his campaign.

Kaufman appealed to the New York Supreme Court in 2009. He lost the appeal, and the Supreme Court upheld the fine against him and his campaign.

Political offices
Preceded by Arthur Katzman	New York City Council, 13th district 1974–1982	Succeeded by Fernando Ferrer
New York State Assembly
Preceded by Eliot Engel	New York State Assembly, 81st district 1989–1992	Succeeded by Oliver Koppell
Preceded by Larry Seabrook	New York State Assembly, 82nd district 1993–2004	Succeeded by Michael Benedetto
