= James Bacalles =

American politician

James Bacalles (born March 26, 1949) is a former American politician. He was elected to the New York State Assembly as a Republican in 1995. Prior to his election to the assembly he served as mayor of Corning. He served on the Steuben County Board of Supervisors and then the Steuben County Legislature from 1980 till 1989.

== Biography ==
James Bacalles was born on March 26, 1949. He graduated from Corning East in 1967, and he studied political science at Utica College and Syracuse University. Bacalles married Mary Honors, an elementary school teacher, in 1975. They had two sons together. He was elected to the Steuben County Board of Supervisors in 1979, and he served in the position until 1989. He was elected mayor of Corning, New York, in 1992. Bacalles was elected to the New York State Assembly in a special election in 1995. He represented the Republican Party while in office.

Bacalles unsuccessfully sought the Republican nomination for the New York State Senate 53rd District seat held by George Winner; the nomination went to Tom O'Mara, who also went on to win the general election. As a result, Bacalles could not seek re-election to his seat in the Assembly, and Phil Palmesano was elected to take his place.

New York State Assembly
Preceded by Donald R. Davidsen	New York State Assembly, 130th District; 1995–2002	Succeeded by Joseph Errigo
Preceded by Joseph Errigo	New York State Assembly, 136th District; 2003–2010	Succeeded by Philip Palmesano
