= Carl Andrews (politician) =

American politician

Member of the New York State Senate from the 20th district
- In office February 12, 2002 – December 31, 2006
- Preceded by: Marty Markowitz
- Succeeded by: Eric Adams

Personal details
- Born: September 9, 1956 (age 69) Brooklyn, New York, U.S.
- Party: Democratic
- Education: Medgar Evers College (BA); University at Albany, SUNY (MA)

Carl Andrews was a member of the New York State Senate from Brooklyn from 2002 to 2006. A Democrat, he represented Crown Heights, Flatbush, Park Slope, Windsor Terrace, and Prospect Heights.

A graduate of Medgar Evers College – with an MA in African-American Studies from SUNY-Albany – Andrews' first stint in public office came in 1981, when he sat on a community school board in the 17th District, Crown Heights. He's also served as a member of Community Board 8.

Andrews has taught as an adjunct professor at both The College of New Rochelle and at his alma mater, Medgar Evers College. In addition, he has served as Attorney General Eliot Spitzer's Director of Intergovernmental Relations.

In February 2002, Andrews ran for an open seat in the 20th State Senate district and won a special election to fill the vacancy left when Marty Markowitz won the race for Brooklyn Borough President in November 2001.

== Congressional campaign ==
Andrews was one of four Democratic candidates vying to represent the 11th Congressional district of New York State in a hotly contested, volatile race.

Even though he was endorsed by influential New York politicians, including Attorney General Eliot Spitzer, State Senator Carl Kruger, New York City Comptroller Bill Thompson, he was also subjected to criticism for his decision to remain in this race-thus potentially splintering the African-American vote in a divided primary-especially after another African-American candidate, Assemblyman Nick Perry, withdrew from the race in May.

Carl Andrews was also the subject of criticism from some quarters for his close association with former chairman of the Kings County Democratic Party, and Assemblyman, Clarence Norman, who was forced to resign from his official positions as a result of his indictment and conviction on multiple felony counts of violating election law in late 2005.

On August 14, 2006, Andrews received the endorsement of the New York State AFL-CIO. In order to receive the endorsement Andrews need the support of over two-thirds of the union membership, which union president Dennis Hughes stated Andrews had achieved.

On September 12, 2006, Andrews was defeated in a four-way Democratic primary, garnering nearly 23% of the vote, and coming in third.

== Candidate debate ==
Andrews participated in a debate broadcast by NY1 on August 24, 2006, stating that former Kings County Democratic Leader Clarence Norman "did some good things as county leader and some bad things as county leader". He also took highlighted several high-profile endorsements from leading members of the New York State Democratic Party, such as state Comptroller Alan Hevesi, and state Attorney General and gubernatorial candidate Eliot Spitzer.

New York State Senate
Preceded by Marty Markowitz	New York State Senate, 20th District; 2002–2006	Succeeded by Eric Adams
