= Maureen O'Connell =

American politician (born 1950)

County Clerk of Nassau County
- Incumbent
- Assumed office January 1, 2006
- Preceded by: Karen Murphy

Member of the New York State Assembly from the 17th district
- In office January 1, 1999 – January 1, 2005
- Preceded by: Michael Balboni
- Succeeded by: Thomas McKevitt

Personal details
- Born: May 23, 1950 (age 76)
- Party: Republican
- Spouse: Donald O’Connell Sr.
- Children: Donald O’Connell Jr.
- Education: St. Joseph's College; St. John's Law School
- Profession: nurse, lawyer, politician

Maureen C. O'Connell (born May 23, 1950) is the County Clerk of Nassau County, New York, an adjunct faculty member of the Adelphi University School of Nursing, and a member of the School of Nursing Advisory Boards of Nassau Community College, Molloy College, and State University of New York at Farmingdale.

== Education ==
O'Connell attended Mineola High School. A registered nurse, she is a graduate of the Flushing Hospital and Medical Center School of Nursing and holds a B.S. in Health Care Administration from St. Joseph's College. O'Connell is also an attorney, with a Juris Doctor from St. John's University School of Law.

== Political career ==
O'Connell served as a Trustee and as Deputy Mayor of the Village of East Williston from 1991 through 1998.

Prior to her taking office as County Clerk on January 1, 2006, O'Connell served as the first woman to be sent by the 17th District to the New York State Assembly, where she served as ranking member of the Assembly's Health Committee and on the Judiciary, Insurance and Ethics Committees. She was also a member of the Sexual Assault and Violence Education (S.A.V.E.) taskforce on sex crimes and violence against women and children. She serves on the board of directors of the St. John's University School of Law Alumni Association and the Maternity & Early Childhood Foundation.

In January 2007, O'Connell was selected as the Republican, Conservative, and Independence candidate for the open 7th State Senatorial District in a special election, called by Governor Eliot Spitzer to fill the vacancy created by the resignation of Senator Michael A.L. Balboni. Her opponent was Democrat Craig Johnson, a County Legislator who was strongly endorsed by former governor Eliot Spitzer. The polls closed February 6, 2007 with Johnson defeating O'Connell.

== Personal life ==
Maureen O'Connell lives in East Williston with her husband Donald. They have one son named Donald Jr. She has 3 grandchildren.

== New York State election results ==
- November 1998 general election, NYS Assembly, 17th AD

Maureen C. O'Connell (REP - CON)	...	25,124
Richard V. Mannheimer (DEM - LIB)	...	10,389
Joseph Cascio (RTL)	...	1,311

- November 2000 general election, NYS Assembly, 17th AD

Maureen C. O'Connell (REP - IND - CON)	...	28,804
Emil L. Samuels (DEM - LIB - WOR)	...	16,829
Walter J. Beagan (RTL)	...	1,588
Elizabeth L. Henley (GRE)	...	372

- November 2002 general election, NYS Assembly, 17th AD

Maureen C. O'Connell (REP - IND - CON)	...	25,965
Thomas E. Sobczak (DEM)	...	10,494
Joseph P. Cascio (RTL)	...	1,138
Jacqueline A. Maron (LIB)	...	189

- November 2004 general election, NYS Assembly, 17th AD

Maureen C. O'Connell (REP - IND - CON)	...	35,465
Anthony A. Pellegrino (DEM - WOR)	...	21,859

- February 2007 special election, NYS Senate, 7th SD

Craig M. Johnson (DEM - WOR)	...	27,632
Maureen C. O'Connell (REP - IND - CON)	...	23,995

New York State Assembly
Preceded by Michael Balboni	New York State Assembly, 17th District; 1998–2005	Succeeded by Thomas McKevitt
Political offices
Preceded by Karen Murphy	Nassau County Clerk; 2006–present	Incumbent
