= James P. Hayes =

American politician

Jim Hayes

Member of the New York State Assembly from the 148th district
- In office January 1999 – September 2011

Personal details
- Born: July 23, 1964 (age 62) Erie County, New York
- Party: Republican
- Children: 2
- Education: Canisius College
- Profession: politician

James P. "Jim" Hayes (born July 23, 1964) is an American politician from Amherst, New York who served in the New York State Assembly from 1999 to 2011. Elected in 1998, he represented parts of Erie and Niagara counties until his resignation in September 2011.

Previous to his election, from 1995–1998, he served as the first director of development for Catholic Charities of Buffalo. Prior to that he served as director of alumni relations and as an admissions counselor to Canisius College, where he earned his B.A. degree in political science in 1986.

Hayes was born in Erie County and resides in Amherst, New York. He has three children.

Hayes announced his resignation effective September 6, 2011, to work in the private sector.

New York State Assembly
Preceded by Richard R. Anderson	New York State Assembly, 142nd District; 1999–2002	Succeeded by Sandra Lee Wirth
Preceded by Sandra Lee Wirth	New York State Assembly, 148th District; 2003–2011	Succeeded by Raymond Walter
