= Steven L. Labriola =

American politician

Member of the New York State Assembly from the 12th district
- In office January 1, 1997 – December 31, 2003
- Preceded by: Philip B. Healey
- Succeeded by: Joseph Saladino

Personal details
- Born: June 26, 1962 (age 64) Massapequa Park, New York, U.S.
- Party: Republican Party (United States)
- Children: 3
- Education: St. John's University

Steven L. Labriola (born June 26, 1962) is an American politician. From 1997 to 2002, he served as the representative of the 12th district in the New York State Assembly. From 2004 to 2012, he served as the town clerk for Oyster Bay, New York. On February 26, 2019, Labriola was appointed to the Oyster Bay Town Board. He replaced Rebecca Alesia.

== Early life ==
Labriola was born on July 26, 1962, in Massapequa Park, New York. He attended Massapequa Park schools before going to college at St. John's University, acquiring a Bachelor's degree in government.

== Political career ==
In 1984, Labriola began his political career by working as an aide to congressman Norman F. Lent. He then served as the Director of Operations for the town of Oyster Bay, New York.

Labriola ran to be the New York State Assembly representative for the 12th district in 1996. To become the incumbent, he defeated Carl Lowe of the Democratic Party and Robert G. Barca of the Liberal Party. Labriola won re-election in 1998 after running against Democratic candidate Benjamin Podgor.

In 2003, Labriola ran for the office of Oyster Bay town clerk. He won the election, beating incumbent Martha Offerman. Labriola ended his tenure as town clerk in 2012.

== Personal life ==
Labriola currently lives in Massapequa Park, New York with his family.

Political offices
Preceded by Philip B. Healey	Member of the New York State Assembly from the 12th district 1997–2003	Succeeded by Joseph Saladino
