= Ada L. Smith =

American politician from New York (born 1945)

Member of the New York State Senate
- In office 1989–2006
- Preceded by: Thomas J. Bartosiewicz
- Succeeded by: Shirley Huntley
- Constituency: 20th district 12th district 10th district

Personal details
- Born: April 18, 1945 Amherst County, Virginia, U.S.
- Died: March 10, 2025 (age 79)
- Party: Democratic

Ada Lavern Smith (April 18, 1945 – March 10, 2025) was an American politician from New York. A Democrat, Smith served in the New York State Senate from 1989 to 2006.

In 2006, Senate Minority Leader David Paterson stated that Smith had engaged in "a pattern of inappropriate, unprofessional and often abusive behavior". A staffer accused Smith of menacing her with a knife in 1996. In 1998, Smith was taken into custody after engaging in an altercation with a police officer. Smith was removed from a Senate leadership post in 2004 following a criminal conviction that arose from an incident at an Albany parking garage. She was convicted of misdemeanor harassment in 2006 after throwing hot coffee onto a member of her staff. Following the coffee attack, she was stripped of a stipend and a state-issued vehicle. She was defeated by Shirley Huntley in a 2006 Democratic primary.

== Early life and education ==
Smith was born on April 18, 1945 in Amherst County, Virginia, and was raised in New York City. She was African-American. Smith graduated from Baruch College in 1973 with a bachelor's degree in marketing.

== Career ==
In the 1980s, Smith worked as a deputy city clerk.

A Democrat, Smith was a member of the New York State Senate from 1989 to 2006. She represented portions of Brooklyn and Queens. Smith served as Senate minority conference whip, as minority conference chair, as assistant minority leader for policy and administration, and as ranking member of the Senate Corporations, Authorities and Commissions Committee. She employed more than 200 staffers during her Senate tenure.

Smith was convicted of misdemeanor harassment in August 2006. Nevertheless, she was backed by her party organization in the 2006 Democratic Senate primary election. Challenger Shirley Huntley defeated Smith in the September 2006 Democratic primary and went on to win the general election later that year.

== Complaints, altercations, and crimes ==
A 2006 article in the New York Daily News stated that Smith had "a history of bizarre, allegedly abusive behavior that dates back nearly 20 years".

In 1996, Senate staffer LaSone Garland-Bryan accused Smith of menacing her with a knife while they were alone in Smith's office. According to Garland-Bryan's statement, Smith became angry when she overheard Garland-Bryan telling family members that Smith "sometimes forgot to take her medication". Garland-Bryan declined to press charges, but made an official complaint about the incident to then-Senate Minority Leader Martin Connor. Connor responded by asserting that he had "no authority" to punish Smith.

Smith was taken into custody in 1998 after allegedly biting a police officer in Brooklyn. Smith allegedly argued with police when she was unable to drive past a police vehicle and officers declined to move it. (The officers were in the process of making a traffic stop.) Smith refused to exit her vehicle and refused to provide identification. When one officer reached into Smith's vehicle, Smith allegedly bit his hand. She was subdued with mace, handcuffed, and brought to the police station.

In 2004, Smith faced legal difficulties following an incident at a state parking garage in Albany. Smith allegedly cursed at a state trooper, defied his order to hand over her identification, and drove into the parking garage. The state trooper testified that he had to step out of the way of Smith's oncoming vehicle so that his foot would not be run over. Smith's actions led to a conviction; following that conviction, then-Senate Minority Leader David Paterson removed her from a leadership post.

In 2004, a former Smith staffer, Wayne Mahlke, alleged that Smith had subjected him to verbally abusive comments relating to sexual orientation. The following year, the state's Division of Human Rights dismissed his claims due to insufficient evidence.

Smith attacked a staffer, Jennifer Jackson, on March 21, 2006 in Smith's Albany office. Smith arrived at the office following a Weight Watchers meeting that morning and mentioned that she had lost 4.3 pounds. Jackson told police that she replied, "'at the rate you go around, I would have thought you'd lose 20 pounds'". Jackson claimed that Smith cursed and threw hot coffee in her eyes. Before leaving the office, Jackson allegedly told Smith, "'Senator, you can't do this to people. It's abusive'". Smith allegedly pulled off Jackson's hairpiece, threw it to the floor, and said, "'If you tell anyone what happened in this office, I will f—ing kill you'". Jackson was treated for injuries to her eyes, neck, and shoulders. Smith's lawyer denied the charges and accused Jackson of lying to authorities, claiming that Jackson actually told the senator she needed to lose 100 pounds. In the aftermath of the coffee attack, then-Senate Minority Leader David Paterson stripped Smith of her state-issued car, her honorary title, and a $9,500 per year stipend attached to her leadership position. Paterson stated that the coffee attack was the latest example of what he called "a pattern of inappropriate, unprofessional and often abusive behavior" from Smith.

Smith was charged with assault in the third degree, a misdemeanor, in connection with the coffee attack on Jackson. She pleaded not guilty in Albany City Court. In August 2006, Smith was convicted of misdemeanor harassment. She was fined and ordered to attend an anger management program.

In 2006, the New York Daily News referred to Smith as "'the Wild Woman of Albany'".

== Death ==
Smith died on March 10, 2025.

New York State Senate
Preceded by Thomas J. Bartosiewicz	New York State Senate; 20th district 1989–1992	Succeeded by Marty Markowitz
Preceded by Leonard P. Stavisky	New York State Senate; 12th district 1993–2002	Succeeded by George Onorato
Preceded by Malcolm Smith	New York State Senate; 10th district 2003–2006	Succeeded by Shirley Huntley
