= Willis Stephens =

American politician (born 1955)

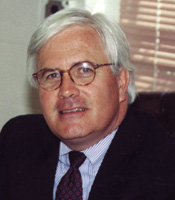

Member of the New York State Assembly from the 99th district
- In office 1995–2006
- Preceded by: Vincent Leibell
- Succeeded by: Gregory R. Ball

Personal details
- Born: November 22, 1955 (age 70) Brewster, New York, U.S.
- Party: Republican
- Spouse: Ginny Stephens
- Children: 3
- Education: Cornell University (BA); St. John's University (JD)

Willis "Will" Stephens Jr. (born November 22, 1955) is an American attorney and former politician who represented the 99th district in the New York State Assembly. After serving in the Assembly for twelve years, Stephens was defeated in the September 2006 primary by Assemblyman Greg Ball and lost the Republican nomination. He was one of only three Republicans in the Assembly to be endorsed by Planned Parenthood.

== Early life and education ==
Stephens was born in Brewster, New York. He earned a Bachelor of Arts degree in government and political studies from Cornell University and a Juris Doctor from the St. John's University School of Law.

== Career ==
Stephens served on the Ways and Means, Rules, and the Judiciary Committees. The former Assemblyman has drawn heavy criticism from conservative groups due to his endorsements from traditionally liberal leaning organizations such as the CSEA (Civil Service Employees Association), AFL-CIO (American Federation of Labor and Congress of Industrial Organizations), New York State United Teachers (NYSUT), Planned Parenthood, and EANY (Environmental Advocates of New York). While serving as a member of the Assembly Ethics Committee, Stephens was cited by watchdog groups after using campaign contributions for personal expenses, including a clown for a children's party.

On September 12, 2006, in the Republican Primary for New York's 99th district, Ball defeated Stephens with 71.14% (4,750 votes) to 28.86% (1,297 votes) for Stephens, the lowest vote total for any incumbent running for reelection to the State Assembly.

Stephens claimed he had been the victim of a negative campaign, citing mailings that were distributed calling him a 'country-club liberal' and highlighting his close relationship with Assembly Speaker Sheldon Silver. However, Stephens himself drew criticism when he refused to repudiate a letter about challenger Greg Ball which falsely claimed Ball had received a dishonorable discharge from the United States Air Force. Stephens was also criticized heavily for not returning campaign contributions from indicted Connecticut trash magnate James Galante.

Due to New York's electoral fusion system, the Assemblyman had vowed to remain in the race on the Conservative and Independence lines. Ultimately, Stephens decided to withdraw from the race altogether, instead taking a nomination for Supreme Court Justice in Queens.

== Controversy ==
=== "Pontificating idiots" email ===
In June 2005, Stephens sent an email to a discussion group, or "listserv" that focuses on the community of Brewster. He thought the message was going to Beth Coursen, an aide in his Assembly district office. Instead he sent his reply to all subscribers, referring to them as pontificating idiots.

The discussion group, called "Brewster10509", has a web site describing what the list is for. Members are free to post anything that has to do with government, education, community organizations and a host of other things related to Brewster and the surrounding Town of Southeast. After realizing his mistake, he issued an apology to the users of the message board to which he said, "In fact, now I most closely resemble the type of poster I described."

Assemblyman Stephens apologized publicly to the members of the group as well as the entire district.

=== Putnam victory fund ===
Stephens, who also serves as the legal counsel to the town of Southeast, New York, drew heavy criticism after accepting $9,355 from trash magnate, convicted felon and reputed mob boss James Galante, who was in turn awarded a $1.5 million no-bid garbage contract by the town board on Stephens' recommendation.

Assemblyman Stephens refused to make public a copy of the secret memo recommending that Galante's contract be renewed for a record $1.5 million without allowing public bids even as Galante had been recently arrested under the Federal Racketeer Influenced and Corrupt Organizations Act (RICO), stating that "[t]hat's a legal opinion that is a matter of attorney–client privilege. It's not subject to the New York Freedom of Information Law ... it would be up to the town, not [me], whether to release the memo."

According to the Danbury News-Times, "Willis H. Stephens, Jr. has received millions of tax dollars in aggregate payments as Southeast's municipal counsel for more than ten years. In 2005 alone, Southeast taxpayers paid Stephens, Jr. an estimated $190,000 for legal work, which included legal work involving a no-bid municipal contract worth an estimated $1.5 million tax dollars to an admitted felon at that time under investigation by Federal law enforcement authorities for alleged racketeering. Although Southeast taxpayers paid Stephens, Jr. for legal work, although pertinent Southeast garbage contract negotiations ceased nearly a year ago, although Southeast taxpayers are bound today under contract terms negotiated by Stephens, Jr. and the Southeast Town Board with a major campaign contributor presently under Federal indictment for alleged racketeering, Stephens, Jr. asserts that taxpayers have no right to see his legal work."

Galante, who was previously convicted of tax evasion and arrested in June for allegedly conspiring with organized crime to prevent competition in the garbage business in Connecticut, was accused of donating to a Political Action Committee which laundered money to several politicians who may have used their influence to award contracts to Galante's trash hauling business.

== Personal life ==
Stephens, his wife, Ginny, and their three children reside in Brewster, New York.

== See also ==
- List of members of the New York State Assembly

New York State Assembly
Preceded by Vincent Leibell	Member of the New York State Assembly from the 91st district 1995–2002	Succeeded by Ronald Tocci
Preceded by Patrick R. Manning	Member of the New York State Assembly from the 99th district 2003–2006	Succeeded by Greg Ball
