= Susan V. John =

American politician (1957–2021)

Member of the New York State Assembly from the 131st district
- In office January 1, 1991 – December 31, 2010
- Preceded by: Gary Proud
- Succeeded by: Harry Bronson

Personal details
- Born: November 20, 1957 Chicago, Illinois
- Died: November 22, 2021 (aged 64) Englewood, Florida
- Party: Democratic

Susan V. John (November 20, 1957 – November 22, 2021) was an American politician who served in the New York State Assembly from Monroe County, New York. A Democrat, she represented the 131st district from January 1, 1991, to December 31, 2010. She was succeeded by Harry Bronson, a fellow Democrat.

She died of cancer on November 22, 2021, in Englewood, Florida, two days after her 64th birthday.

New York State Assembly
| Preceded by Gary Proud | New York State Assembly, 131st District; January 1, 1991 – December 31, 2010 | Succeeded by Harry Bronson |
