= Joan Christensen =

American politician

Joan K. Christensen was a member of the New York State Assembly, for the 119th district (which included Salina, DeWitt, Onondaga and some neighborhoods of Syracuse). First elected in 1990, she retired after 20 years of service in the assembly. She is a Democrat.

== Political career ==
Christensen was a member of the Syracuse Common Council before being elected to the assembly. She was first elected to the assembly in 1990, defeating Syracuse Common Councilman Joseph O'Hara in the Democratic primary election, and then incumbent Republican William Bush in the general election. She became the first woman from Onondaga County elected to the New York State Assembly.

She was subsequently reelected nine times; her closest reelection was in 2002, when she defeated Republican nominee Bill Sanford, a former Assemblyman, with 59 percent of the vote. Christensen decided not to seek reelection in 2010, retiring to spend more time with her family.

In the Assembly, Christensen was primarily known for her constituent services work, rather than policymaking efforts. Christensen was a principal sponsor of the New York safe-haven law. In 2002, Christensen supported the unsuccessful effort of Assemblyman Michael Bragman to oust Sheldon Silver as speaker of the Assembly.

== Personal life ==
Christensen has four children and many children.

== Notes ==
New York State Assembly
Preceded by William E. Bush	New York State Assembly, 119th District; 1991–2010	Succeeded by Sam Roberts
