= David Koon =

American politician

David R. Koon
- Born: March 18, 1947 (age 79); Buckhannon, West Virginia, U.S.
- Spouse: Suzanne
- Children: Jason; Jennifer (1974-1993)

David R. Koon (born March 18, 1947) is an American former Democratic politician who represented District 135 in the New York State Assembly, which includes the towns and villages of East Rochester, Penfield and Webster, and Fairport, neighboring communities located in upstate New York in the eastern suburbs of Rochester from 1996 to 2010.

== Professional ==
Koon studied at Fairmont State College, West Virginia, earning a BS in 1969. He worked at Kelly Springfield in Cumberland, MD from 1970–82, and joined Bausch & Lomb in 1982 as an Industrial Engineer. He was transferred and moved to Fairport in 1989.

== Family ==
Koon and his wife, Suzanne, have had two children, Jason Koon and Jennifer Patterson Koon. In 1993, Jennifer, then 18 years old, was abducted from a suburban mall parking lot, beaten, raped and murdered. (The assailant was convicted and is serving a sentence of 37½ years to life.) David Koon asked a local official to have security cameras installed in such parking lots, but received no response. Thus began his political activism. He ran against the county legislator, losing a close election. Jason Koon was elected to a four-year term as the Mayor of East Rochester in 2007. He did not seek re-election in 2011.

== Election and E911 Activism ==
Koon successfully ran for the 135th Assembly District seat in a special election held in February 1996 (to replace James Alesi, who had been elected to the state senate). He was elected to a full term in November of that year. Koon serves as a member of the Alcoholism and Drug Abuse; Economic Development, Job Creation, Commerce and Industry; Local Governments; Small Business; and Library and Education Technology Committees. He is also Vice Chair of the Legislative Commission on Rural Resources and Vice Chair of the Legislative Commission on Toxic Substances and Hazardous Waste.

In 1998, through Saint John Fisher College, Koon and his wife Suzanne were instrumental in creating and managing the Jennifer Patterson Koon Peacemaking Foundation, in honor of their daughter. The Foundation "recognize(s) and honor persons who have made a significant contribution to peacemaking and who foster and stimulate a commitment to peacemaking in our society." One of Koon's legislative priorities has been full funding for E911, a system of automatically locating those who've called 911, in New York State. His daughter had called 911 during her abduction ordeal, but although the call lasted 20 minutes, 911 dispatchers were not able to locate her. Although E911 had received some funding in the state since 1991, it had not been fully implemented as late as 2003. Koon pressed his case in 2003, against opposition from then-governor George Pataki.

== Issues ==
While serving, Koon was s in favor of state presence in providing child care and job training for displaced workers, national standards for education and state-funded vouchers for private school education, and increased penalties for violent crime (including capital punishment and elimination of the statute of limitation for criminal sex cases).

== Legislation ==
On March 28, 2008, Assemblyman Koon announced the passage of a bill he authored which allows for the New York State Thruway Authority to issue annual short-distance commuter permits on the Thruway in the Rochester area at no charge between interchanges and barriers in the permit area. This bill would allow those citizens who travel for work in the Rochester area to use the Thruway at reduced rates or free of charge (A7094).

New York State Assembly
Preceded by James S. Alesi	New York State Assembly, 135th District; February 1996 – December 31, 2010	Succeeded by Mark C. Johns
