= Thomas J. Kirwan =

American politician

Member of the New York State Assembly from the 104th district
- In office 1994–2008; 2010–2011

Personal details
- Born: January 17, 1933 Newburgh, New York, U.S.
- Died: November 28, 2011 (aged 78) Newburgh, New York, U.S.
- Party: Republican

Thomas J. Kirwan (January 17, 1933 – November 28, 2011) was an American politician and member of the New York State Assembly. He represented the 100th Assembly District, which includes the cities of Beacon, Newburgh and Poughkeepsie, and the towns of Marlboro, Newburgh, Lloyd and Shawangunk.

Prior to his election to the assembly, Kirwan served for 28 years with the New York State Police, retiring with the position of lieutenant in the Bureau of Criminal Investigations. He spent four years with the New York Drug Enforcement Task Force.

Kirwin was born in 1933 in Newburgh, New York and was a native of, and lifelong resident of, the City of Newburgh, New York. Kirwan first served in the State Assembly from 1994 to 2008 representing parts of Orange, Ulster and Dutchess counties. A Republican, he was narrowly defeated in 2008 by Democrat Frank Skartados by some 800 votes. However, he recaptured the seat in 2010, beating Skartados by a wafer thin margin of 15 votes. The results of the election took over one hundred days to certify, and when completed on February 16, 2011, was the last legislative race in the United States to be decided. The dramatic litigation over the recount occurred because the historic win eventually broke Speaker of the New York State Assembly Sheldon Silver's long-held Democratic supermajority in the Assembly Chamber by giving Assembly Republicans their 51st seat in the chamber, which would allow them to prevent the override of a gubernatorial veto.

Kirwan had a reputation as a "reformer" after a 2007 lawsuit where he and Democratic State Senator Liz Krueger joined together to sue Silver, former Governor of New York George Pataki and then Senate Leader Joe Bruno over the infamous legislative dysfunction at the New York State Capitol in Albany, citing disenfranchisement of minority party members of both houses. A pair of suits accused Senate and Assembly leadership of stifling minority legislators by not providing them equal resources for staff, withholding funds for member items, and making it impossible for minority legislators to have their bills heard in legislative committees for vote in their respective houses. Although the plaintiffs were initially successful, because Kirwan lost his seat in 2008, appeals on the suit were never decided by the courts, and the New York State Legislature is still widely criticized by good government groups such as New York University's Brennan Center for Justice as "the most dysfunctional legislature in the United States of America".

Kirwan, who had experienced heart trouble for several years, died of kidney failure on November 28, 2011, aged 78, at the Newburgh campus of St. Luke's-Cornwall Hospital. He was survived by his widow, Verna, two children, and two grandchildren. New York Governor Andrew Cuomo scheduled a special election for March 20, 2012, to elect Kirwan's successor.

New York State Assembly
Preceded by Lawrence E. Bennett	New York State Assembly; 96th District; 1995–2002	Succeeded by Nancy Calhoun
Preceded by Roy J. McDonald	New York State Assembly; 112th District; 2003–2008	Succeeded by Frank Skartados
Preceded by Frank Skartados	New York State Assembly; 100th District; 2011	Succeeded by Frank Skartados
