= Ronald Canestrari =

American politician (1943–2026)

Ron Canestrari
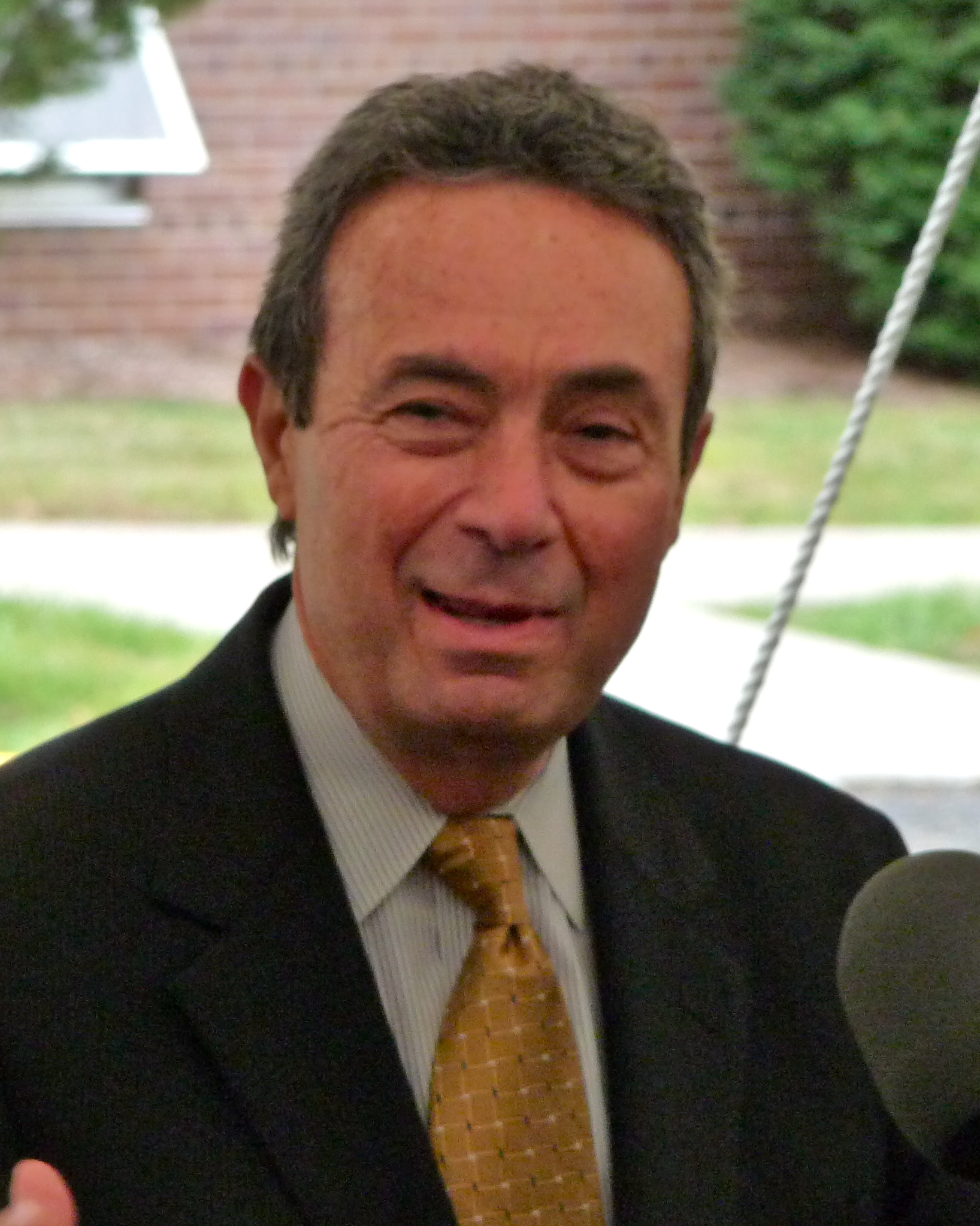
- Canestrari in 2009

Member of the New York State Assembly from the 106th district
- In office 1989–2012
- Preceded by: Michael McNulty
- Succeeded by: Didi Barrett

Personal details
- Born: May 22, 1943 Cohoes, New York, U.S.
- Died: November 9, 2026 (aged 83)
- Party: Democratic
- Education: Fordham College; Fordham University School of Law
- Profession: Lawyer, politician

Ronald J. Canestrari (May 22, 1943 – November 9, 2026) was an American politician who was a Democratic member of the New York State Assembly, serving in office from 1989 to 2012.

== Life and career ==
=== Early life ===
Canestrari was born on May 22, 1943, in Cohoes. He attended the Christian Brothers Academy in Albany. He graduated B.Sc. from Fordham College in 1965, and J.D. from Fordham University School of Law in 1968. He was an enlisted member of the United States Army from 1969 to 1971, and worked as an attorney for the federal government and the Army.

=== Mayor ===
Canestrari served as mayor of Cohoes from 1976 until 1989. During his tenure as mayor, he was an active member of the New York State Conference of Mayors and served as the organization's president.

=== State assembly ===
Canestrari was a member of the New York State Assembly from 1989 to 2012, sitting in the 188th through 199th New York State Legislatures. His district included parts of Albany, Rensselaer and Saratoga counties, sections of the cities of Albany and Troy, and all of the cities of Cohoes and Rensselaer. Canestrari was Chairman of the Higher Education Committee. In 2007, he became Majority Leader of the State Assembly. He ran uncontested in the 2008 and 2010 general elections. On April 9, 2012, he announced that he would not seek re-election later that year.

=== Death ===
Canestrari died on November 9, 2026, at the age of 83.

New York State Assembly
| Preceded by Michael R. McNulty | New York State Assembly; 106th District; 1989–2012 | Succeeded by Didi Barrett |
Political offices
| Preceded by Paul Tokasz | Majority Leader of the New York State Assembly; 2007–2012 | Succeeded by Joseph D. Morelle |
