= Raymond A. Meier =

American politician (born 1952)

Raymond Meier
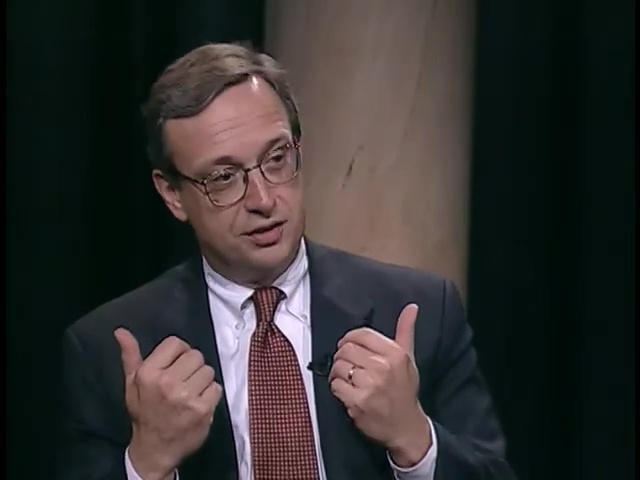
- Meier on CUNY TV's The Urban Agenda, 2001

Member of the New York Senate from the 47th district
- In office January 1997 – January 2007
- Preceded by: William Sears
- Succeeded by: Joseph Griffo

Personal details
- Born: October 23, 1952 (age 73) Rome, New York
- Party: Republican
- Spouse: Kimberly Davis-Meier

Raymond A. "Ray" Meier was born on October 23, 1952, in Rome, New York, to Alfred and Irene Meier. Mr. Meier served as a Republican in the New York State Senate representing New York's 47th district for five terms. The 47th Senate district comprises Lewis County as well as portions of St. Lawrence and Oneida counties.

== Background ==
Meier holds a Bachelor of Arts degree in political science and a Juris Doctor degree from Syracuse University. He is a graduate of Rome Free Academy. He is married to Kimberly Davis-Meier. They have two children.

While serving in the state senate, Meier held outside work as well. He was of counsel with the Utica law firm of Saunders, Kahler, Amoroso, and Locke. He was a partner in the Rome law firm of McMahon and Grow from 1985 to 1991, and an associate in the law offices of Paul A. Worlock from 1977 to 1983. Meier was commissioned as an officer in the U.S. Army Reserves in 1974 and served until 1985.

== Political career ==
Meier's political career began in 1975, when he unsuccessfully ran for the Oneida County Legislature. From 1977 to 1978, he served as Deputy Onondaga County Attorney. In 1978 until 1980 Meier was a legislative counsel to his political mentor, the late Senator James H. Donovan. From 1980 to 1983 Meier served on the Corporation Counsel for the City of Rome. Meier went on to serve as Oneida County Legislator from 1986 to 1991. In 1991 Meier was appointed to serve out the term of Oneida County Executive John Plumley, who had abruptly resigned. He was later elected to the position.

=== Oneida County Executive ===
During his time as Oneida County Executive, from 1991 to 1996, he proposed six straight balanced budgets. Meier eliminated a $9 million deficit and built a $13 million fund surplus.

=== 47th District, New York State Senate ===
In 1996, then Senator of the New York State's 47th district, and fellow Republican, William Sears, announced his retirement. It was then Meier decided to pursue a higher office and campaign for the vacant seat. Meier was opposed by third-party candidate, Donald J. Thomas, who was endorsed by the New York State Right to Life Party. That November, Meier would win the general election.

In 1997, Meier served on a joint Senate-Assembly Energy Conference Committee which developed the "Power for Jobs" program, an agreement intended to provide low-cost power to employers in New York State.

Meier was a supporter of the STAR School Tax Relief program which became law in 1997, and was accelerated in 1998. He also sponsored the "innocent spouse" law, which took effect January 1, 1999, to protect citizens from liability for tax bills incurred by an unscrupulous spouse.

In 1997, Meier served as Chairman of the Senate Committee on Veterans and Military Affairs. He worked to pass legislation giving veterans groups more freedom to spend the money they raise, and sponsored a 1997 constitutional amendment to give active duty military personnel veterans’ credits on civil service exams. The amendment was approved by voters in a statewide referendum. Meier's work was essential in the passing of the veteran's buyback bill, which permits public employees to obtain up to three years of service credit in the public retirement system for their military service during periods of conflict.

In October 2001 Meier was appointed to the position of co-chairman of the National Conference of State Legislatures' TANF (Temporary Assistance to Needy Families) Reauthorization Task Force. He testified before the United States Congress on TANF Reauthorization in April 2002, and served as a Member At-large of NCSL's executive committee.

In 2003, he was appointed by Senate Majority Leader Joseph Bruno to serve as a co-chair of the United States Senate bipartisan Task Force on Medicaid Reform. The Task Force held roundtable discussions across New York State for more than six months. Meier authored a law requiring the United States Department of Health and Human Services to apply for a Federal Medicaid waiver to create a pilot program to offer less costly, more appropriate care to Medicaid patients in need of long-term care.

=== 24th Congressional District, New York ===
Meier was chosen as one of only two Republicans in New York State to serve on the Platform Committee for the 2004 Republican National Convention. He chose not to run for a sixth term, instead running for an open Congressional seat being vacated by Sherwood Boehlert. Meier lost that race to Democratic D.A., Mike Arcuri. His senate seat was won by conservative Republican Joseph Griffo.

== Career after politics ==
In 2007 Meier joined law firm Bond, Schoeneck & King as Of Counsel as a member of the Business Law Department. While still with that company, Meier became a volunteer liaison for federal agencies in the City of Rome, where he had served on the Corporation Counsel, with the aim of increasing economic connections. Rome Police arrested Meier in Rome New York on Saturday, August 10, 2019. He has been charged with common law DWI and aggravated DWI, which indicates a blood alcohol content of .18% or higher.

Political offices
Preceded by	Oneida County, New York Legislator, 35th District; January 1, 1986 - January 13, 1991	Succeeded by
Preceded by John D. Plumley	Oneida County, New York Executive; January 14, 1991 - December 31, 1996	Succeeded by Ralph J. Eannace Jr.
Preceded by William R. Sears	New York State Senate, 47th District; 1997–2007	Succeeded by Joseph Griffo
