= Nancy Calhoun =

American politician (born 1944)

Member of the New York State Assembly
- In office January 1, 1991 – December 31, 2012
- Preceded by: Bill Larkin
- Succeeded by: James Skoufis
- Constituency: 95th district (1991–1992); 94th district (1993–2002); 96th district (2003–2012)

Personal details
- Born: July 10, 1944 (age 82) Suffern, New York, U.S.
- Party: Republican
- Spouse: William Mulherin

Nancy Calhoun (born July 10, 1944) is a retired Republican member of the New York State Assembly for the 96th district. She was first elected in 1990. Born in Suffern, New York, she began her career as in 1976 as Washingtonville Central School District Tax Collector and served in the position until 1984. She elected to the Blooming Grove town board in 1982 and served until 1985. She was elected Supervisor of the town of Blooming Grove in 1985 and served until 1990.

After losing the nomination of the Orange County Republican Party, Calhoun decided to retire after 22 years in the Assembly. The district was re-numbered as the 99th, and Democrat James Skoufis won the 2012 election to represent this area now.

New York State Assembly
Preceded by Bill Larkin	New York State Assembly, 95th District; 1991–1992	Succeeded by John Bonacic
Preceded by John Bonacic	New York State Assembly, 94th District; 1993–2002	Succeeded by Alexander Gromack
Preceded by Thomas Kirwan	New York State Assembly, 96th District; 2003–2012	Succeeded by Kenneth Zebrowski, Jr.
