= RoAnn Destito =

American politician

Ro Ann Destito

Commissioner of the New York State Office of General Services
- In office May 10, 2011 – November 21, 2021
- Preceded by: John C. Egan
- Succeeded by: Jeanette M. Moy

Member of the New York State Assembly from the 116th district
- In office January 1, 1993 – May 9, 2011
- Preceded by: Ralph Eannace
- Succeeded by: Anthony Brindisi

Personal details
- Born: January 15, 1956 (age 70) Utica, New York
- Party: Democratic

Ro Ann Maggiolino Destito (born January 15, 1956) was appointed Commissioner of the New York State Office of General Services overseeing all state contracts, by Governor Andrew Cuomo in 2011. She resigned from this position in October 2021 and was succeeded by Jeanette M. Moy who was appointed by Governor Hochul in October 2021 (https://ogs.ny.gov/commissioner-jeanette-m-moy). Prior to becoming Commissioner she was a member of the New York State Assembly for the 116th district (which includes Rome and Utica) from 1993 to 2011 when she resigned. She is a Democrat.

== Career ==
Her tenure included a seat on the New York State Liquor Authority Board. While she was on the SLA, her husband's liquor wholesale client the Oneida Indian Nation's Turning Stone Resort & Casino was granted the legal right to have alcohol served at the casino. In 2009, Oneida County Legislator Michael Hennessy spoke out against issuing the permit and requested an investigation. To comply with this deal approximately 1,200 employees were switched from working for Turning Stone to now being employed by CD Food & Beverage.

In September 2011, Destito proclaimed a curfew of 7pm to help Albany State Park Police break up a demonstration. Protesters argued that by sleeping in a public park they were expressing a protected First Amendment right to free speech and were not subject to curfews. Albany police did not make any arrests.

In 2013, she was accused of ethics violations by lobbying for the casino's gaming deal.

== Personal life ==
She is the widow of Chris Destito, former President of the Rome Chamber of Commerce and owner of the Beeches Restaurant and Convention Center; and the mother of one son.

New York State Assembly
| Preceded by Ralph Eannace | New York State Assembly, 116th District; 1993–2011 | Succeeded by Anthony Brindisi |
