= Sandra Lee Wirth =

American politician and businesswoman

Sandra Lee Wirth (June 8, 1945 – March 11, 2006) was an American politician and businesswoman.

Born in Buffalo, New York, Wirth owned a real estate business. She represented her hometown of West Seneca, New York as the 9th District Erie County Legislator from 1991 to 1994.

From 1995 until her death in 2006, from cancer, Wirth served, in the New York State Assembly, as a Republican.

== Notes ==
New York State Assembly
Preceded by Vincent J. Graber Sr.	New York State Assembly; 148th District; 1995–2002	Succeeded by James P. Hayes
Preceded by Richard R. Anderson	New York State Assembly; 142nd District; 2003–2006	Succeeded by Mike Cole
