= Peter M. Rivera =

American politician

Peter Rivera

Commissioner of the New York State Department of Labor
- In office July 1, 2012 – December 31, 2014
- Governor: Andrew Cuomo
- Preceded by: Colleen Gardner
- Succeeded by: Roberta Reardon

Member of the New York State Assembly from the 76th district
- In office January 1, 1993 – June 30, 2012
- Preceded by: Aurelia Greene
- Succeeded by: Micah Kellner

Personal details
- Born: November 12, 1946 (age 80) Ponce, Puerto Rico
- Education: Pace University (BBA); St. John's University School of Law (JD)

Peter Rivera (born November 12, 1946) is an American politician who represented District 76 in the New York State Assembly, which comprises West Farms, Van Nest, Castle Hill and Parkchester. He later served as the New York State Commissioner of Labor.

== Early life and education ==
Born in Ponce, Puerto Rico, Rivera earned a degree in business administration from Pace University in 1968, and a J.D. from St. John's University School of Law in 1974. The following year, he was admitted to the New York State Bar Association.

== Career ==
Rivera began his career as a patrolman and detective with the New York Police Department in the South Bronx. Rivera then became an agent with the Drug Enforcement Administration. After graduating from law school, he began to work as an assistant district attorney in the Homicide Bureau of the Bronx County District Attorney's Office. He has been in private law practice since 1978.

First elected to the Assembly in 1992, Rivera was the Chairman of the New York Assembly's Puerto Rican/Hispanic Task force and Assembly Committee on Mental Health, Mental Retardation, and Developmental Disabilities. He was the highest-ranking self-described Latino officeholder within the State Assembly.

In the summer of 2010, The New York Times reported that Rivera would face a Democratic primary election challenge from Bronx lawyer Luis R. Sepúlveda. Rivera went on to defeat Sepulveda in the 2010 primary.

Rivera resigned from his assembly seat in 2012 to take the position of New York State Commissioner of Labor.

New York State Assembly
Preceded by Aurelia Greene	New York State Assembly; 76th District; 1993–2012	Succeeded by Micah Kellner
