= Patrick R. Manning =

American politician

Patrick R. Manning (born June 9, 1965) is a former New York State Assemblyman who served in the Assembly from 1994 to 2006.

== Education ==
Manning graduated with a Bachelor of Arts degree in political science from Vassar College in 1986. At Vassar, he protested against apartheid in South Africa.

== Career ==
=== Politics ===
In 1991, Manning won a seat on the Dutchess County Legislature for the 20th District. He served in the New York State Assembly from 1994 to 2006, and was, at the time, "the youngest state assemblyman ever elected." During this period, Manning "was instrumental in attracting the Hudson Valley Renegades to Dutchess County."

In late 2005, Manning began a gubernatorial campaign, finding support initially from the New York Conservative Party. Manning's main opponents for the Republican nomination for governor were John Faso, the eventual nominee, who was formerly New York Assembly Minority Leader and later member of Congress, and William Weld, the former governor of Massachusetts.

In 2006, Manning decided instead to seek re-election to his Assembly seat, but with primary challengers. In the Republican primary election on September 12, 2006, Manning was defeated by then Tivoli Mayor and Dutchess County legislator Marcus Molinaro. Manning held a lead in the Columbia County portion of the district, but this was not enough to overcome Molinaro's lead in the Dutchess segment. Reflecting on the loss, Manning noted “I was ready to retire, but I didn’t realize it.” Manning attempted a return to the New York State Assembly in 2012, but lost in the primary to Kiernan Lalor.

=== Business ventures ===
Since retiring from politics, Manning has served as the executive director of a housing non-profit, co-owner of a farm, and board member of an agricultural cooperative.

==== Minor league ice hockey ====
In 2023, Manning became president of the Hudson Valley Vipers, a minor-league hockey team in Poughkeepsie that plays its home games at the McCann Ice Arena at the Majed J. Nesheiwat Convention Center.

On May 20, 2024, Manning bought the Elmira River Sharks hockey team of the Federal Prospects Hockey League and relocated them to the Hudson Valley. The team, renamed the Hudson Valley Venom, played at IceTime Sports Complex in Newburgh, New York until Manning sold the team in December 2024.

== See also ==
- New York gubernatorial election, 2006

New York State Assembly
Preceded by Glenn Warren	Member of the New York State Assembly from the 99th district 1995–2002	Succeeded by Willis Stephens, Jr.
Preceded by Jim Tedisco	Member of the New York State Assembly from the 103rd district 2003–2006	Succeeded by Marc Molinaro
