= Charles H. Nesbitt =

American politician

Charles H. Nesbitt, known as Charlie Nesbitt, is an American politician from the State of New York.

A Republican, Nesbitt was first elected to the New York State Assembly in 1992. Before serving in the Assembly, he was a member of the Albion Town Council. He represented the 137th Assembly District, which encompassed portions of Genesee, Monroe, Orleans, and Niagara counties. Nesbitt held the post of Assembly Minority Leader from 2002 to 2005. In 2005, he was appointed to the New York Tax Appeals Tribunal by Gov. George Pataki; he served as president of that body. In February 2020, Assembly Minority Leader Will Barclay appointed Nesbitt to New York's Independent Redistricting Commission. As of 2020, Nesbitt resides in the Town of Albion in Orleans County, New York.

A decorated helicopter pilot with the 57fl1 Assault Helicopter Co. during the Vietnam War, Mr. Nesbitt served in the U.S. armed forces for ten years. He earned the Distinguished Flying Cross for heroism while participating in aerial flight while serving in Vietnam, as well as the air medal with 26 oak leaf clusters.

New York State Assembly
Preceded by R. Stephen Hawley	Member of the New York State Assembly from the 137th district 1993–2003	Succeeded by George H. Winner Jr.
Preceded by David E. Seaman	Member of the New York State Assembly from the 139th district 2003–2005	Succeeded by Stephen Hawley
Preceded by John Faso	Minority Leader of the New York State Assembly; 2002–2005	Succeeded by Jim Tedisco
