= 2024 New York State Assembly election =

2024 New York Assembly election
- November 5, 2024

All 150 seats in the New York State Assembly 76 seats needed for a majority
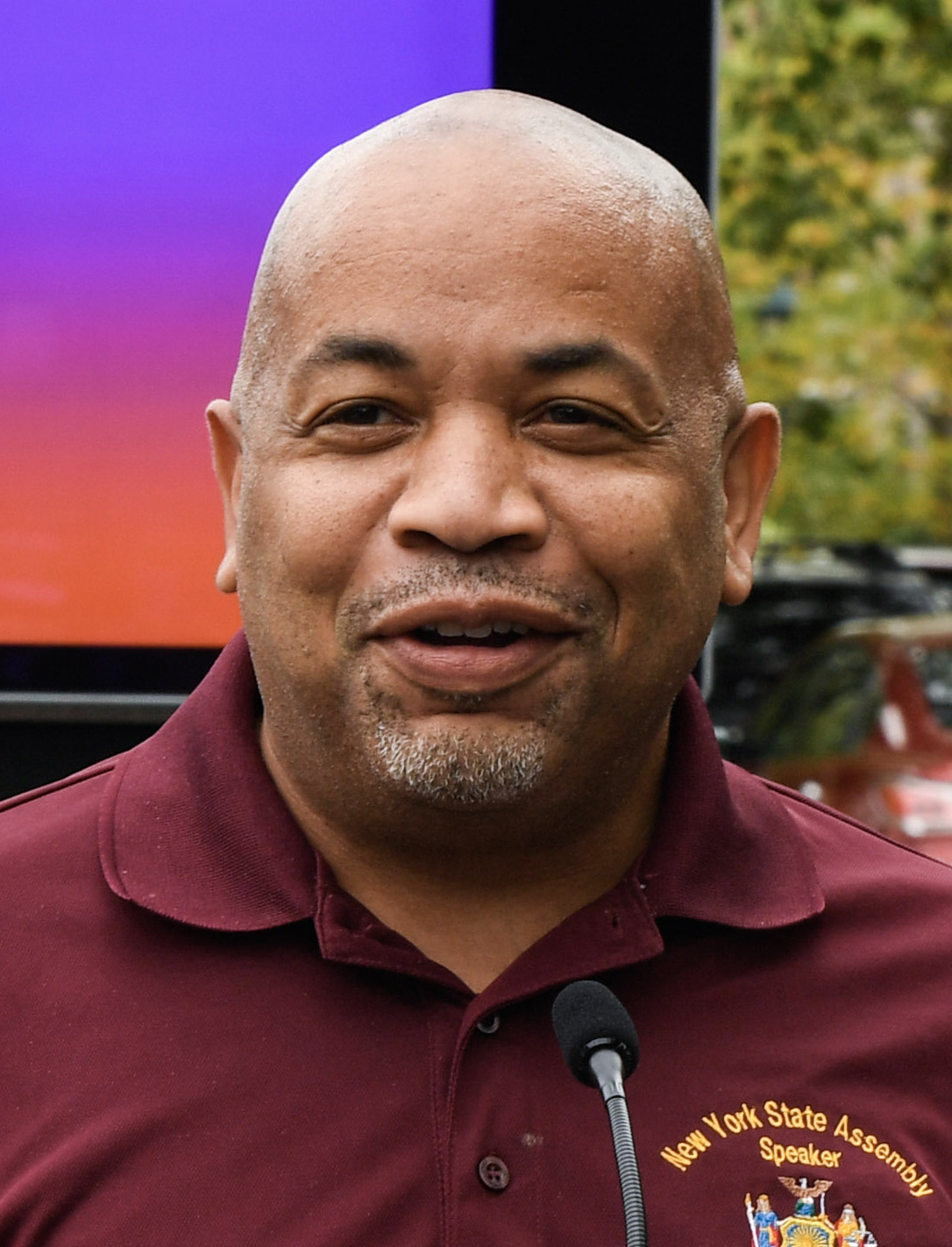

	Majority party	Minority party
Leader	Carl Heastie	William Barclay
Party	Democratic	Republican
Leader since	February 3, 2015	January 7, 2020
Leader's seat	83rd-Williamsbridge	120th-Pulaski
Last election	102 seats	48 seats
Seats won	103	47
Seat change	▲1	▼1
Popular vote	3,983,969	2,700,194
Percentage	54.55%	36.97%
Swing	▲3.79%	▼2.76%
- Democratic gain Republican gain Democratic hold Republican hold 50–60% 60–70% 70–80% 80–90% >90% 50–60% 60–70% 70–80% >90%
Speaker before election
Carl Heastie
Democratic
Elected Speaker
Carl Heastie
Democratic

The 2024 New York State Assembly election was held on November 5, 2024. This election coincided with elections for U.S. Senate, U.S. House of Representatives, the U.S. presidential election, and state senate, among others. Districts for this election were redrawn pursuant to court order in Nichols v. Hochul, though the lines passed by the Independent Redistricting Commission and the state legislature on April 28, 2023, were nearly identical to the 2022 districts. Democrats have held a majority in the New York State Assembly since 1975.

== Outgoing incumbents ==
=== Incumbents not running for reelection ===
==== Democrats ====
1. 1st: Fred Thiele retired.
2. 11th: Kimberly Jean-Pierre retired.
3. 18th: Taylor Darling retired to run for State Senate.
4. 35th: Jeffrion Aubry retired.
5. 41st: Helene Weinstein retired.
6. 69th: Daniel O'Donnell retired.
7. 70th: Inez Dickens retired.
8. 100th: Aileen Gunther retired.
9. 109th: Pat Fahy retired to run for the State Senate.

==== Republicans ====
1. 133rd: Marjorie Byrnes retired.
2. 144th: Michael Norris retired.
3. 148th: Joseph Giglio retired.
4. 150th: Andy Goodell retired.

=== Incumbents who vacated office before end of term ===
==== Democrats ====
1. 27th: Daniel Rosenthal, resigned July 14, 2023 to take a position at the UJA-Federation of New York. Replaced by Sam Berger in a special election held September 12, 2023.
2. 77th: Latoya Joyner, resigned January 8, 2024 to take a position in the private sector. Replaced by Landon Dais in a special election held February 13, 2024.
3. 85th: Kenny Burgos, resigned July 19, 2024 to take a position in the private sector.
4. 96th: Kenneth Zebrowski Jr., resigned July 10, 2024 to take a position in the private sector.

=== Incumbents defeated in primary elections ===
==== Democrats ====
1. 37th: Juan Ardila lost renomination to Claire Valdez.

== Predictions ==
Source	Ranking	As of
Sabato's Crystal Ball	Safe D	October 23, 2024

== Summary by district ==
=== Election ===
2024 New York State Assembly election General election — November 5, 2024
New York State Assembly 2024
Party	Votes	Percentage	Seats	+/–
Democratic	3,983,969	54.55	103	▲1
Republican	2,700,194	36.97	47	▼1
Conservative	375,280	5.14	0	Steady
Working Families	204,881	2.81	0	Steady
Others	8,834	0.12	0	Steady
Scattering	30,243	0.41	0	Steady
Valid votes	7,303,401	87.35	150	—
Blank votes	1,035,882	12.39	—	—
Void votes	21,742	0.26	—	—
Totals	8,361,025	100	150	—

† - Incumbent not seeking re-election

District	Incumbent	Party	Elected Member	Party
1st	Fred Thiele†	Dem	Tommy John Schiavoni	Dem
2nd	Jodi Giglio	Rep	Jodi Giglio	Rep
3rd	Joe DeStefano	Rep	Joe DeStefano	Rep
4th	Ed Flood	Rep	Rebecca Kassay	Dem
5th	Douglas M. Smith	Rep	Douglas M. Smith	Rep
6th	Philip Ramos	Dem	Philip Ramos	Dem
7th	Jarett Gandolfo	Rep	Jarett Gandolfo	Rep
8th	Michael J. Fitzpatrick	Rep	Michael J. Fitzpatrick	Rep
9th	Michael Durso	Rep	Michael Durso	Rep
10th	Steve Stern	Dem	Steve Stern	Dem
11th	Kimberly Jean-Pierre†	Dem	Kwani O'Pharrow	Dem
12th	Keith Brown	Rep	Keith Brown	Rep
13th	Charles D. Lavine	Dem	Charles D. Lavine	Dem
14th	David McDonough	Rep	David McDonough	Rep
15th	Jake Blumencranz	Rep	Jake Blumencranz	Rep
16th	Gina Sillitti	Dem	Daniel Norber	Rep
17th	John Mikulin	Rep	John Mikulin	Rep
18th	Taylor Darling†	Dem	Noah Burroughs	Dem
19th	Ed Ra	Rep	Ed Ra	Rep
20th	Ari Brown	Rep	Ari Brown	Rep
21st	Brian F. Curran	Rep	Judy Griffin	Dem
22nd	Michaelle Solages	Dem	Michaelle Solages	Dem
23rd	Stacey Pheffer Amato	Dem	Stacey Pheffer Amato	Dem
24th	David Weprin	Dem	David Weprin	Dem
25th	Nily Rozic	Dem	Nily Rozic	Dem
26th	Edward Braunstein	Dem	Edward Braunstein	Dem
27th	Sam Berger	Dem	Sam Berger	Dem
28th	Andrew Hevesi	Dem	Andrew Hevesi	Dem
29th	Alicia Hyndman	Dem	Alicia Hyndman	Dem
30th	Steven Raga	Dem	Steven Raga	Dem
31st	Khaleel Anderson	Dem	Khaleel Anderson	Dem
32nd	Vivian Cook	Dem	Vivian Cook	Dem
33rd	Clyde Vanel	Dem	Clyde Vanel	Dem
34th	Jessica González-Rojas	Dem	Jessica González-Rojas	Dem
35th	Jeffrion Aubry†	Dem	Larinda Hooks	Dem
36th	Zohran Mamdani	Dem	Zohran Mamdani	Dem
37th	Juan Ardila	Dem	Claire Valdez	Dem
38th	Jenifer Rajkumar	Dem	Jenifer Rajkumar	Dem
39th	Catalina Cruz	Dem	Catalina Cruz	Dem
40th	Ron Kim	Dem	Ron Kim	Dem
41st	Helene Weinstein†	Dem	Kalman Yeger	Dem
42nd	Rodneyse Bichotte	Dem	Rodneyse Bichotte	Dem
43rd	Brian A. Cunningham	Dem	Brian A. Cunningham	Dem
44th	Robert Carroll	Dem	Robert Carroll	Dem
45th	Michael Novakhov	Rep	Michael Novakhov	Rep
46th	Alec Brook-Krasny	Rep	Alec Brook-Krasny	Rep
47th	William Colton	Dem	William Colton	Dem
48th	Simcha Eichenstein	Dem	Simcha Eichenstein	Dem
49th	Lester Chang	Rep	Lester Chang	Rep
50th	Emily Gallagher	Dem	Emily Gallagher	Dem
51st	Marcela Mitaynes	Dem	Marcela Mitaynes	Dem
52nd	Jo Anne Simon	Dem	Jo Anne Simon	Dem
53rd	Maritza Davila	Dem	Maritza Davila	Dem
54th	Erik Martin Dilan	Dem	Erik Martin Dilan	Dem
55th	Latrice Walker	Dem	Latrice Walker	Dem
56th	Stefani Zinerman	Dem	Stefani Zinerman	Dem
57th	Phara Souffrant Forrest	Dem	Phara Souffrant Forrest	Dem
58th	Monique Chandler-Waterman	Dem	Monique Chandler-Waterman	Dem
59th	Jaime Williams	Dem	Jaime Williams	Dem
60th	Nikki Lucas	Dem	Nikki Lucas	Dem
61st	Charles Fall	Dem	Charles Fall	Dem
62nd	Michael Reilly	Rep	Michael Reilly	Rep
63rd	Sam Pirozzolo	Rep	Sam Pirozzolo	Rep
64th	Michael Tannousis	Rep	Michael Tannousis	Rep
65th	Grace Lee	Dem	Grace Lee	Dem
66th	Deborah Glick	Dem	Deborah Glick	Dem
67th	Linda Rosenthal	Dem	Linda Rosenthal	Dem
68th	Eddie Gibbs	Dem	Eddie Gibbs	Dem
69th	Daniel J. O'Donnell†	Dem	Micah Lasher	Dem
70th	Inez Dickens†	Dem	Jordan Wright	Dem
71st	Al Taylor	Dem	Al Taylor	Dem
72nd	Manny De Los Santos	Dem	Manny De Los Santos	Dem
73rd	Alex Bores	Dem	Alex Bores	Dem
74th	Harvey Epstein	Dem	Harvey Epstein	Dem
75th	Tony Simone	Dem	Tony Simone	Dem
76th	Rebecca Seawright	Dem	Rebecca Seawright	Dem
77th	Landon Dais	Dem	Landon Dais	Dem
78th	George Alvarez	Dem	George Alvarez	Dem
79th	Chantel Jackson	Dem	Chantel Jackson	Dem
80th	John Zaccaro Jr.	Dem	John Zaccaro Jr.	Dem
81st	Jeffrey Dinowitz	Dem	Jeffrey Dinowitz	Dem
82nd	Michael Benedetto	Dem	Michael Benedetto	Dem
83rd	Carl Heastie	Dem	Carl Heastie	Dem
84th	Amanda Septimo	Dem	Amanda Septimo	Dem
85th	Vacant		Emerita Torres	Dem
86th	Yudelka Tapia	Dem	Yudelka Tapia	Dem
87th	Karines Reyes	Dem	Karines Reyes	Dem
88th	Amy Paulin	Dem	Amy Paulin	Dem
89th	J. Gary Pretlow	Dem	J. Gary Pretlow	Dem
90th	Nader Sayegh	Dem	Nader Sayegh	Dem
91st	Steven Otis	Dem	Steven Otis	Dem
92nd	MaryJane Shimsky	Dem	MaryJane Shimsky	Dem
93rd	Chris Burdick	Dem	Chris Burdick	Dem
94th	Matt Slater	Rep	Matt Slater	Rep
95th	Dana Levenberg	Dem	Dana Levenberg	Dem
96th	Vacant		Patrick Carroll	Dem
97th	John W. McGowan	Rep	Aron Wieder	Dem
98th	Karl Brabenec	Rep	Karl Brabenec	Rep
99th	Chris Eachus	Dem	Chris Eachus	Dem
100th	Aileen Gunther†	Dem	Paula Kay	Dem
101st	Brian Maher	Rep	Brian Maher	Rep
102nd	Christopher Tague	Rep	Christopher Tague	Rep
103rd	Sarahana Shrestha	Dem	Sarahana Shrestha	Dem
104th	Jonathan Jacobson	Dem	Jonathan Jacobson	Dem
105th	Anil Beephan Jr.	Rep	Anil Beephan Jr.	Rep
106th	Didi Barrett	Dem	Didi Barrett	Dem
107th	Scott Bendett	Rep	Scott Bendett	Rep
108th	John McDonald	Rep	John McDonald	Rep
109th	Patricia Fahy†	Dem	Gabriella Romero	Dem
110th	Phillip Steck	Dem	Phillip Steck	Dem
111th	Angelo Santabarbara	Dem	Angelo Santabarbara	Dem
112th	Mary Beth Walsh	Rep	Mary Beth Walsh	Rep
113th	Carrie Woerner	Dem	Carrie Woerner	Dem
114th	Matt Simpson	Rep	Matt Simpson	Rep
115th	Billy Jones	Dem	Billy Jones	Dem
116th	Scott Gray	Rep	Scott Gray	Rep
117th	Ken Blankenbush	Rep	Ken Blankenbush	Rep
118th	Robert Smullen	Rep	Robert Smullen	Rep
119th	Marianne Buttenschon	Dem	Marianne Buttenschon	Dem
120th	William A. Barclay	Rep	William A. Barclay	Rep
121st	Joe Angelino	Rep	Joe Angelino	Rep
122nd	Brian Miller	Rep	Brian Miller	Rep
123rd	Donna Lupardo	Dem	Donna Lupardo	Dem
124th	Christopher Friend	Rep	Christopher Friend	Rep
125th	Anna Kelles	Dem	Anna Kelles	Dem
126th	John Lemondes Jr.	Rep	John Lemondes Jr.	Rep
127th	Albert A. Stirpe Jr.	Dem	Albert A. Stirpe Jr.	Dem
128th	Pamela Hunter	Dem	Pamela Hunter	Dem
129th	William Magnarelli	Dem	William Magnarelli	Dem
130th	Brian Manktelow	Rep	Brian Manktelow	Rep
131st	Jeff Gallahan	Rep	Jeff Gallahan	Rep
132nd	Phil Palmesano	Rep	Phil Palmesano	Rep
133rd	Marjorie Byrnes†	Rep	Andrea Bailey	Rep
134th	Josh Jensen	Rep	Josh Jensen	Rep
135th	Jennifer Lunsford	Dem	Jennifer Lunsford	Dem
136th	Sarah Clark	Dem	Sarah Clark	Dem
137th	Demond Meeks	Dem	Demond Meeks	Dem
138th	Harry Bronson	Dem	Harry Bronson	Dem
139th	Stephen Hawley	Rep	Stephen Hawley	Rep
140th	William Conrad III	Dem	William Conrad III	Dem
141st	Crystal Peoples-Stokes	Dem	Crystal Peoples-Stokes	Dem
142nd	Patrick Burke	Dem	Patrick Burke	Dem
143rd	Monica Wallace	Dem	Patrick Chludzinski	Rep
144th	Michael Norris†	Rep	Paul Bologna	Rep
145th	Angelo Morinello	Rep	Angelo Morinello	Rep
146th	Karen McMahon	Dem	Karen McMahon	Dem
147th	David DiPietro	Rep	David DiPietro	Rep
148th	Joseph Giglio†	Rep	Joe Sempolinski	Rep
149th	Jonathan Rivera	Dem	Jonathan Rivera	Dem
150th	Andy Goodell†	Rep	Andrew Molitor	Rep

== Assembly districts ==
District	2016/2020 pres. result	Member	Party	First elected	Status	Challengers
1	D+4	Fred Thiele	Dem	1995+	Incumbent retiring. New member elected. Democratic hold.	Stephen Kiely (R-C) T. John Schiavoni (D-WF)
2	R+8	Jodi Giglio	Rep	2020	Incumbent re-elected.	Tricia Chiaramonte (D)
3	R+4	Joe DeStefano	Rep	2018	Incumbent re-elected.	Trina Miles (D)
4	D+1	Edward Flood	Rep	2022	Incumbent lost re-election. New member elected. Democratic gain.	Rebecca Kassay (D)
5	R+8	Douglas M. Smith	Rep	2018+	Incumbent re-elected.	Michael Reynolds (D)
6	D+20	Philip Ramos	Dem	2002	Incumbent re-elected.	Daniel Mitola (R)
7	R+6	Jarett Gandolfo	Rep	2020	Incumbent re-elected.	Garrett Petersen (D)
8	R+19	Michael J. Fitzpatrick	Rep	2002	Incumbent re-elected.	Steven Basileo (D-WF)
9	R+19	Michael Durso	Rep	2020	Incumbent re-elected.	Steven DellaVecchia (D)
10	D+5	Steve Stern	Dem	2018+	Incumbent re-elected.	Aamir Sultan (R-C)
11	D+6	Kimberly Jean-Pierre	Dem	2014	Incumbent retiring. New member elected. Democratic hold.	Kwani O'Pharrow (D) Joseph Cardinale (R-C)
12	R+2	Keith Brown	Rep	2020+	Incumbent re-elected.	Thomas Cox (D)
13	D+9	Charles D. Lavine	Dem	2004	Incumbent re-elected.	Ruka Anzai (R)
14	R+8	David McDonough	Rep	2002+	Incumbent re-elected.	Ellen DeFrancesco (D)
15	R+2	Jake Blumencranz	Rep	2022	Incumbent re-elected.	William Murphy (D)
16	D+7	Gina Sillitti	Dem	2020	Incumbent lost re-election. New member elected. Republican gain.	Daniel Norber (R-C)
17	R+10	John Mikulin	Rep	2018+	Incumbent re-elected.	Harpreet Toor (D)
18	D+39	Taylor Darling	Dem	2018	Incumbent retiring to run for State Senate. New member elected. Democratic hold.	Noah Burroughs (D-WF) Danielle Smikle (R-C)
19	R+6	Ed Ra	Rep	2010	Incumbent re-elected.	Sanjeev Jindal (D)
20	R+4	Eric Brown	Rep	2022+	Incumbent re-elected.	Tina Posterli (D)
21	D+6	Brian Curran	Rep	2022	Incumbent lost re-election. New member elected. Democratic gain.	Judy Griffin (D)
22	D+15	Michaelle C. Solages	Dem	2012	Incumbent re-elected.	Ian Bergstrom (R-C)
23	D+2	Stacey Pheffer Amato	Dem	2016	Incumbent re-elected.	Thomas Sullivan (R-C-Common Sense)
24	D+25	David Weprin	Dem	2010+	Incumbent re-elected.	Ruben Cruz II (R-C-Common Sense) Misbah Mahmood (People First)
25	D+14	Nily Rozic	Dem	2012	Incumbent re-elected.	Kenneth Chong Paek (R-C)
26	D+10	Edward Braunstein	Dem	2010	Incumbent re-elected.	Robert Speranza (C-Common Sense)
27	D+8	Sam Berger	Dem	2023+	Incumbent re-elected.	Angelo King (R)
28	D+12	Andrew Hevesi	Dem	2005+	Incumbent re-elected.	Jonathan Rinaldi (R-Common Sense-Truth)
29	D+42	Alicia Hyndman	Dem	2015+	Incumbent re-elected.	Dwayne Moore (R)
30	D+19	Steven Raga	Dem	2022	Incumbent re-elected.	Brandon Castro (R-Common Sense)
31	D+39	Khaleel Anderson	Dem	2020	Incumbent re-elected.	
32	D+43	Vivian E. Cook	Dem	1990	Incumbent re-elected.	
33	D+37	Clyde Vanel	Dem	2016+	Incumbent re-elected.	
34	D+26	Jessica González-Rojas	Dem	2020	Incumbent re-elected.	
35	D+26	Jeffrion L. Aubry	Dem	1992+	Incumbent retiring. New member elected. Democratic hold.	Larinda Hooks (D-WF)
36	D+32	Zohran Mamdani	Dem	2020	Incumbent re-elected.	
37	D+26	Juan Ardila	Dem	2022	Incumbent lost renomination. New member elected. Democratic hold.	Claire Valdez (D-WF)
38	D+23	Jenifer Rajkumar	Dem	2020	Incumbent re-elected.	
39	D+24	Catalina Cruz	Dem	2018	Incumbent re-elected.	
40	D+14	Ron Kim	Dem	2012	Incumbent re-elected.	Philip Wang (R-C)
41	D+6	Helene Weinstein	Dem	1980	Incumbent retiring. New member elected. Democratic hold.	Kalman Yeger (D-R-C)
42	D+37	Rodneyse Bichotte	Dem	2014	Incumbent re-elected.	
43	D+39	Brian Cunningham	Dem	2022+	Incumbent re-elected.	
44	D+35	Robert Carroll	Dem	2016	Incumbent re-elected.	John Bennett (R-C)
45	R+16	Michael Novakhov	Rep	2022	Incumbent re-elected.	Joey Cohen-Saban (D)
46	D+2	Alec Brook-Krasny	Rep	2022	Incumbent re-elected.	Chris McCreight (D)
47	D+2	William Colton	Dem	1996	Incumbent re-elected.	David Sepiashvili (R-C)
48	R+26	Simcha Eichenstein	Dem	2018	Incumbent re-elected.	
49	D+5	Lester Chang	Rep	2022	Incumbent re-elected.	
50	D+29	Emily Gallagher	Dem	2020	Incumbent re-elected.	
51	D+33	Marcela Mitaynes	Dem	2020	Incumbent re-elected.	Erik Frankel (R-C)
52	D+42	Jo Anne Simon	Dem	2014	Incumbent re-elected.	Brett Wynkoop (C)
53	D+40	Maritza Davila	Dem	2013+	Incumbent re-elected.	
54	D+40	Erik Martin Dilan	Dem	2014	Incumbent re-elected.	
55	D+45	Latrice Walker	Dem	2014	Incumbent re-elected.	Berneda Jackson (R-C)
56	D+45	Stefani Zinerman	Dem	2020	Incumbent re-elected.	
57	D+44	Phara Souffrant Forrest	Dem	2020	Incumbent re-elected.	
58	D+45	Monique Chandler-Waterman	Dem	2022+	Incumbent re-elected.	
59	D+23	Jaime Williams	Dem	2016+	Incumbent re-elected.	
60	D+43	Nikki Lucas	Dem	2022+	Incumbent re-elected.	
61	D+21	Charles Fall	Dem	2018	Incumbent re-elected.	
62	R+26	Michael Reilly	Rep	2018	Incumbent re-elected.	
63	R+2	Sam Pirozzolo	Rep	2022	Incumbent re-elected.	Matthew Mobila (D)
64	R+12	Michael Tannousis	Rep	2020	Incumbent re-elected.	
65	D+33	Grace Lee	Dem	2022	Incumbent re-elected.	
66	D+40	Deborah J. Glick	Dem	1990	Incumbent re-elected.	
67	D+37	Linda Rosenthal	Dem	2006+	Incumbent re-elected.	
68	D+39	Eddie Gibbs	Dem	2022+	Incumbent re-elected.	
69	D+41	Daniel J. O'Donnell	Dem	2002	Incumbent retiring. New member elected. Democratic hold.	Micah Lasher (D)
70	D+44	Inez Dickens	Dem	2016	Incumbent retiring. New member elected. Democratic hold.	Jordan Wright (D) Seson Adams (R)
71	D+41	Al Taylor	Dem	2017+	Incumbent re-elected.	Joziel Andujar (R)
72	D+37	Manny De Los Santos	Dem	2016	Incumbent re-elected.	
73	D+30	Alex Bores	Dem	2022	Incumbent re-elected.	Awadhesh Gupta (R)
74	D+36	Harvey Epstein	Dem	2018+	Incumbent re-elected.	
75	D+37	Tony Simone	Dem	2022	Incumbent re-elected.	
76	D+32	Rebecca Seawright	Dem	2014	Incumbent re-elected.	
77	D+40	Landon Dais	Dem	2024+	Incumbent re-elected.	Norman Sobe McGill (R) Elianni Del Carmen Tejada Fabian (C)
78	D+37	George Alvarez	Dem	2022	Incumbent re-elected.	John Santiago (R-C)
79	D+41	Chantel Jackson	Dem	2020	Incumbent re-elected.	Sharon Darby (R) Emmanuel Findlay (C)
80	D+29	John Zaccaro Jr.	Dem	2022	Incumbent re-elected.	Nicholas Marricco (R) Grace Marrero (C)
81	D+30	Jeffrey Dinowitz	Dem	1994+	Incumbent re-elected.	Kevin Pazmino (R-C)
82	D+21	Michael Benedetto	Dem	2004	Incumbent re-elected.	Juan De La Cruz (R-C)
83	D+43	Carl Heastie	Dem	2000	Incumbent re-elected.	Stephanie Liggio (R-C)
84	D+39	Amanda Septimo	Dem	2020	Incumbent re-elected.	Rosaline Nieves (R) Tyreek Goodman (C)
85	D+40	Kenny Burgos	Dem	2020	Incumbent retiring. New member elected. Democratic hold.	Emerita Torres (D) Kelly Atkinson (R) Gary Lutz (C)
86	D+38	Yudelka Tapia	Dem	2022+	Incumbent re-elected.	Woodrow Hines (R) Darney Rivers (C)
87	D+38	Karines Reyes	Dem	2018	Incumbent re-elected.	
88	D+17	Amy Paulin	Dem	2000	Incumbent re-elected.	Thomas Fix Jr. (R-C)
89	D+32	J. Gary Pretlow	Dem	1992	Incumbent re-elected.	
90	D+10	Nader Sayegh	Dem	2018	Incumbent re-elected.	John Isaac (R-C)
91	D+19	Steven Otis	Dem	2012	Incumbent re-elected.	Anna Manger (R)
92	D+18	MaryJane Shimsky	Dem	2022	Incumbent re-elected.	Alessandro Crocco (R-C)
93	D+15	Chris Burdick	Dem	2020	Incumbent re-elected.	
94	R+7	Matt Slater	Rep	2022	Incumbent re-elected.	Zachary Couzens (D)
95	D+14	Dana Levenberg	Dem	2022	Incumbent re-elected.	Michael Capalbo (R-C)
96	D+8	Kenneth Zebrowski Jr.	Dem	2007+	Incumbent retiring. New member elected. Democratic hold.	Patrick Carroll (D-WF) Ronald Diz (R-C)
97	R+3	John McGowan	Rep	2020	Incumbent lost re-election. New member elected. Democratic gain.	Aron Wieder (D) Thomas Sullivan (C)
98	R+10	Karl A. Brabenec	Rep	2014	Incumbent re-elected.	
99	R+6	Chris Eachus	Dem	2022	Incumbent re-elected.	Thomas Lapolla (R-C)
100	D+1	Aileen Gunther	Dem	2003+	Incumbent retiring. New member elected. Democratic hold.	Paula Kay (D-People Over Politics) Louis Ingrassia Jr. (R-C)
101	R+8	Brian Maher	Rep	2022	Incumbent re-elected.	
102	R+11	Christopher Tague	Rep	2018+	Incumbent re-elected.	Janet Tweed (D)
103	D+13	Sarahana Shrestha	Dem	2022	Incumbent re-elected.	Jack Hayes (R-C)
104	D+9	Jonathan Jacobson	Dem	2018+	Incumbent re-elected.	
105	R+7	Anil Beephan Jr.	Rep	2022	Incumbent re-elected.	
106	D+3	Didi Barrett	Dem	2012+	Incumbent re-elected.	Stephen Krakower (R-C)
107	EVEN	Scott Bendett	Rep	2022	Incumbent re-elected.	Chloe Pierce (D)
108	D+6	John T. McDonald III	Dem	2012	Incumbent re-elected.	
109	D+24	Patricia Fahy	Dem	2012	Incumbent retiring to run for State Senate. New member elected. Democratic hold.	Gabriella Romero (D-WF) Alicia Purdy (R-C)
110	D+8	Phillip Steck	Dem	2012	Incumbent re-elected.	Jeff Madden (R-C)
111	EVEN	Angelo Santabarbara	Dem	2012	Incumbent re-elected.	Joseph Mastroianni (R-C)
112	R+2	Mary Beth Walsh	Rep	2016	Incumbent re-elected.	Joseph Seeman (D-WF)
113	D+2	Carrie Woerner	Dem	2014	Incumbent re-elected.	Jeremy Messina (R-C)
114	R+10	Matt Simpson	Rep	2020	Incumbent re-elected.	
115	EVEN	Billy Jones	Dem	2016	Incumbent re-elected.	
116	R+7	Scott Gray	Rep	2022	Incumbent re-elected.	
117	R+18	Ken Blankenbush	Rep	2010	Incumbent re-elected.	
118	R+19	Robert Smullen	Rep	2018	Incumbent re-elected.	
119	R+7	Marianne Buttenschon	Dem	2018	Incumbent re-elected.	Christine Esposito (R-C)
120	R+13	William A. Barclay	Rep	2002	Incumbent re-elected.	
121	R+12	Joe Angelino	Rep	2020	Incumbent re-elected.	Vicki Davis (D)
122	R+9	Brian Miller	Rep	2016	Incumbent re-elected.	Adrienne Martini (D-WF)
123	D+6	Donna Lupardo	Dem	2004	Incumbent re-elected.	Lisa O'Keefe (R-C-Economic Renewal)
124	R+11	Christopher S. Friend	Rep	2010	Incumbent re-elected.	
125	D+18	Anna Kelles	Dem	2020	Incumbent re-elected.	
126	R+2	John Lemondes Jr.	Rep	2020	Incumbent re-elected.	Ian Phillips (D-WF)
127	D+2	Albert A. Stirpe Jr.	Dem	2012	Incumbent re-elected.	Timothy Kelly (R-C)
128	D+15	Pamela Hunter	Dem	2015+	Incumbent re-elected.	Daniel Ciciarelli (R-C)
129	D+15	William Magnarelli	Dem	1998	Incumbent re-elected.	
130	R+9	Brian Manktelow	Rep	2018	Incumbent re-elected.	James Schuler (D)
131	R+6	Jeff Gallahan	Rep	2020	Incumbent re-elected.	
132	R+15	Phil Palmesano	Rep	2010	Incumbent re-elected.	
133	R+10	Marjorie Byrnes	Rep	2018	Incumbent retiring. New member elected. Republican hold.	Colleen Walsh-Williams (D) Andrea Bailey (R-C)
134	R+7	Josh Jensen	Rep	2020	Incumbent re-elected.	
135	D+7	Jennifer Lunsford	Dem	2020	Incumbent re-elected.	Kimberly DeRosa (R-C)
136	D+17	Sarah Clark	Dem	2020	Incumbent re-elected.	
137	D+25	Demond Meeks	Dem	2020	Incumbent re-elected.	Marcus Williams (R-C)
138	D+13	Harry Bronson	Dem	2010	Incumbent re-elected.	Tracy DiFlorio (R-C)
139	R+18	Stephen Hawley	Rep	2006+	Incumbent re-elected.	
140	D+5	William Conrad III	Dem	2020	Incumbent re-elected.	
141	D+39	Crystal Peoples-Stokes	Dem	2002	Incumbent re-elected.	
142	D+1	Patrick B. Burke	Dem	2018	Incumbent re-elected.	Marc Priore (R-C)
143	D+1	Monica P. Wallace	Dem	2016	Incumbent lost re-election. New member elected. Republican gain.	Patrick Chludzinski (R-C)
144	R+13	Michael Norris	Rep	2016	Incumbent retiring. New member elected. Republican hold.	Paul Bologna (R-C) Michelle Roman (D-WF)
145	R+6	Angelo Morinello	Rep	2016	Incumbent re-elected.	Jeffrey Elder (D-WF)
146	D+7	Karen McMahon	Dem	2018	Incumbent re-elected.	Deborah Kilbourn (R-C)
147	R+16	David DiPietro	Rep	2012	Incumbent re-elected.	Darci Cramer (D)
148	R+20	Joseph Giglio	Rep	2005+	Incumbent retiring. New member elected. Republican hold.	Daniel Brown (D) Joe Sempolinski (R-C)
149	D+10	Jonathan Rivera	Dem	2020	Incumbent re-elected.	
150	R+13	Andy Goodell	Rep	2010	Incumbent retiring. New member elected. Republican hold.	Michael Bobseine (D-WF-Restore Freedom) Andrew Molitor (R-C)

- +Elected in a special election.

== See also ==
- List of New York State legislatures
