= New York's 146th State Assembly district =

American legislative district

Assemblymember
Karen McMahon; D–Williamsville

New York's 146th State Assembly district is one of the 150 districts in the New York State Assembly. It has been represented by Karen McMahon since 2019.

== Geography ==
=== 2020s ===
District 146 contains the town of Amherst in Erie County.

The district is entirely within New York's 26th congressional district, and entirely within New York's 61st State Senate district.

=== 2010s ===
District 146 contained the village of Williamsville, the town of Amherst in Erie County and the town of Pendleton in Niagara County.

== Recent election results ==
=== 2026 ===
2026 New York State Assembly election, District 146
Party	Candidate	Votes	%
Democratic	Karen McMahon (incumbent)		
Republican	George McNerney		
Conservative	George McNerney		
Total	George McNerney		
Write-in			
Total votes			

=== 2024 ===
2024 New York State Assembly election, District 146
Party	Candidate	Votes	%
Democratic	Karen McMahon	34.720	
Working Families	Karen McMahon	2,650	
Total	Karen McMahon (incumbent)	37,370	60.0
Republican	Deborah Kilbourn	21,055	
Conservative	Deborah Kilbourn	3,826	
Total	Deborah Kilbourn	24,881	39.9
Write-in		60	0.1
Total votes		62,311	100.0
Democratic hold			

=== 2022 ===
2022 New York State Assembly election, District 146
Party	Candidate	Votes	%
Democratic	Karen McMahon	28,088	
Integrity	Karen McMahon	355	
Total	Karen McMahon (incumbent)	28,443	58.1
Republican	Katrina Zeplowitz	16,334	
Conservative	Katrina Zeplowitz	4,184	
Total	Katrina Zeplowitz	20,518	41.9
Write-in		22	0.0
Total votes		48,983	100.0
Democratic hold			

=== 2020 ===
2020 New York State Assembly election, District 146
Primary election
Party	Candidate	Votes	%
Independence	Robin Wolfgang	439	67.7
Independence	Jonathan Lavell	197	30.4
Write-in		12	1.9
Total votes		648	100
General election
Democratic	Karen McMahon	35,391	
Working Families	Karen McMahon	2,700	
Total	Karen McMahon (incumbent)	38,091	55.2
Republican	Robin Wolfgang	24,888	
Conservative	Robin Wolfgang	4,277	
Independence	Robin Wolfgang	982	
Total	Robin Wolfgang	30,147	43.7
Green	Ruben Cartagena Jr.	753	1.1
Write-in		37	0.0
Total votes		69,028	100.0
Democratic hold			

=== 2018 ===
2018 New York State Assembly election, District 146
Party	Candidate	Votes	%
Democratic	Karen McMahon	26,002	
Working Families	Karen McMahon	1,050	
Women's Equality	Karen McMahon	564	
Total	Karen McMahon	27,616	52.9
Republican	Raymond Walter	19,410	
Conservative	Raymond Walter	3,867	
Independence	Raymond Walter	740	
Reform	Raymond Walter	143	
Total	Raymond Walter (incumbent)	24,160	46.4
Green	Danilo Lawvere	346	0.7
Write-in		3	0.0
Total votes		52,125	100.0
Democratic gain from Republican			

=== 2016 ===
2016 New York State Assembly election, District 146
Primary election
Party	Candidate	Votes	%
Independence	Raymond Walter (incumbent)	147	62.0
Independence	Rachel Obenauer	90	38.0
Write-in		0	0.0
Total votes		237	100
Conservative	Raymond Walter (incumbent)	162	69.8
Conservative	Douglas Lippert	70	30.2
Write-in		0	0.0
Total votes		232	100
Working Families	Steven Meyer	34	81.0
Working Families	William Kracker	8	19.0
Write-in		0	0.0
Total votes		42	100
Green	Steven Meyer	9	53.0
Green	Dorothy Sobczyk	8	47.0
Write-in		0	0.0
Total votes		17	100
Reform	Raymond Walter (incumbent)	11	91.7
Reform	Steven Meyer	1	8.3
Write-in		12	0.0
Total votes		17	100
General election
Republican	Raymond Walter	24,359	
Conservative	Raymond Walter	4,717	
Independence	Raymond Walter	1,322	
Reform	Raymond Walter	162	
Total	Raymond Walter (incumbent)	30,560	51.2
Democratic	Steven Meyer	26,351	
Working Families	Steven Meyer	1,378	
Green	Steven Meyer	909	
Women's Equality	Steven Meyer	508	
Total	Steven Meyer	29,146	48.8
Write-in		0	0.0
Total votes		59,706	100.0
Republican hold			

=== 2014 ===
2014 New York State Assembly election, District 146
Primary election
Party	Candidate	Votes	%
Democratic	Steven Meyer	2,929	53.8
Democratic	Ken Smith	1,236	46.2
Write-in		0	0.0
Total votes		4,165	100
Independence	Raymond Walter (incumbent)	202	72.7
Independence	Steven Meyer	75	27.0
Independence	Ken Smith	1	0.3
Write-in		0	0.0
Total votes		278	100
General election
Republican	Raymond Walter	15,316	
Conservative	Raymond Walter	3,905	
Independence	Raymond Walter	1,432	
Stop Common Core	Raymond Walter	199	
Total	Raymond Walter (incumbent)	20,852	58.7
Democratic	Steven Meyer	12,956	
Working Families	Steven Meyer	1,685	
Total	Steven Meyer	14,641	41.3
Write-in		0	0.0
Total votes		35,493	100.0
Republican hold			

=== 2012 ===
2012 New York State Assembly election, District 146
Primary election
Party	Candidate	Votes	%
Independence	Raymond Walter (incumbent)	123	52.6
Independence	Joanne Schultz	111	47.4
Write-in		0	0.0
Total votes		234	100
General election
Republican	Raymond Walter	25,413	
Conservative	Raymond Walter	3,358	
Independence	Raymond Walter	1,622	
Total	Raymond Walter (incumbent)	30,393	54.2
Democratic	Joanne Schultz	25,711	45.8
Write-in		6	0.0
Total votes		56,110	100.0
Republican hold			
