= New York's 128th State Assembly district =

American legislative district

Assemblymember
Pamela Hunter; D–Syracuse

New York's 128th State Assembly district is one of the 150 districts in the New York State Assembly. It has been represented by Democrat Pamela Hunter since 2015.

== Geography ==
District 128 is in Onondaga County. It contains portions of the city of Syracuse, as well as the surrounding towns of Salina, DeWitt, and Onondaga.

== Recent election results ==
=== 2026 ===
2026 New York State Assembly election, District 128
Party	Candidate	Votes	%
Democratic	Pamela Hunter		
Working Families	Pamela Hunter		
Total	Pamela Hunter (incumbent)		
Republican	Patrick Becher		
Conservative	Patrick Becher		
Total	Patrick Becher		
Write-in			
Total votes			100.0

=== 2024 ===
2024 New York State Assembly election, District 128
Party	Candidate	Votes	%
Democratic	Pamela Hunter	31,864	
Working Families	Pamela Hunter	2,884	
Total	Pamela Hunter (incumbent)	34,748	63.0
Republican	Daniel Ciciarelli	17,555	
Conservative	Daniel Ciciarelli	2,884	
Total	Daniel Ciciarelli	20,382	36.9
Write-in		47	0.1
Total votes		55,177	100.0
Democratic hold			

=== 2022 ===
2022 New York State Assembly election, District 128
Party	Candidate	Votes	%
Democratic	Pamela Hunter	22,539	
Working Families	Pamela Hunter	1,904	
Total	Pamela Hunter (incumbent)	24,443	60.9
Republican	Dominick Ciciarelli	13,114	
Conservative	Dominick Ciciarelli	2,603	
Total	Dominick Ciciarelli	15,717	39.1
Write-in		10	0.0
Total votes		40,170	100.0
Democratic hold			

=== 2020 ===
2020 New York State Assembly election, District 128
Party	Candidate	Votes	%
Democratic	Pamela Hunter	33,575	
Working Families	Pamela Hunter	2,395	
Independence	Pamela Hunter	940	
Total	Pamela Hunter (incumbent)	36,910	65.0
Republican	Stephanie Jackson	16,542	
Conservative	Stephanie Jackson	2,808	
Libertarian	Stephanie Jackson	473	
Total	Stephanie Jackson	19,823	34.9
Write-in		27	0.1
Total votes		56,760	100.0
Democratic hold			

=== 2018 ===
2018 New York State Assembly election, District 128
Party	Candidate	Votes	%
Democratic	Pamela Hunter	28,803	
Independence	Pamela Hunter	2,223	
Working Families	Pamela Hunter	1,658	
Women's Equality	Pamela Hunter	639	
Total	Pamela Hunter (incumbent)	33,323	98.9
Write-in		357	1.1
Total votes		33,680	100.0
Democratic hold			

=== 2016 ===
2016 New York State Assembly election, District 128
Party	Candidate	Votes	%
Democratic	Pamela Hunter	32,524	
Independence	Pamela Hunter	3,192	
Working Families	Pamela Hunter	2,380	
Women's Equality	Pamela Hunter	794	
Total	Pamela Hunter (incumbent)	38,890	99.2
Write-in		301	0.8
Total votes		39,191	100.0
Democratic hold			

=== 2015 special ===
2015 New York State Assembly special election, District 128
Primary election
Party	Candidate	Votes	%
Democratic	Pamela Hunter	1,927	52.4
Democratic	Jean Kessner	1,100	29.9
Democratic	David Stott	650	17.7
Write-in		0	0.0
Total votes		3,677	100
General election
Democratic	Pamela Hunter	10,730	53.7
Republican	John Sharon	6,309	
Independence	John Sharon	743	
Reform	John Sharon	78	
Total	John Sharon	7,130	35.7
Conservative	David Stott	2,111	10.5
Write-in		19	0.1
Total votes		19,990	100.0
Democratic hold			

=== 2014 ===
2014 New York State Assembly election, District 128
Party	Candidate	Votes	%
Democratic	Samuel Roberts	17,415	
Working Families	Samuel Roberts	1,826	
Total	Samuel Roberts (incumbent)	19,241	56.4
Republican	John Sharon	11,418	
Conservative	John Sharon	2,326	
Independence	John Sharon	1,074	
Total	John Sharon	14,818	43.5
Write-in		19	0.1
Total votes		34,097	100.0
Democratic hold			

=== 2012 ===
2012 New York State Assembly election, District 128
Party	Candidate	Votes	%
Democratic	Samuel Roberts	31,277	
Working Families	Samuel Roberts	1,621	
Total	Samuel Roberts (incumbent)	32,898	64.9
Republican	John Sharon	15,202	
Independence	John Sharon	2,501	
Total	John Sharon	17,703	35.0
Write-in		58	0.1
Total votes		50,659	100.0
Democratic hold			
