= New York's 4th State Assembly district =

American legislative district

Assemblymember
Rebecca Kassay; D–Port Jefferson
- Registration: 36.8% Democratic; 28.1% Republican; 28.7% No party preference
- Demographics: 68% White; 6% Black; 14% Hispanic; 9% Asian; 0% Native American; 0% Hawaiian/Pacific Islander; 0% Other
- Population (2020): 123,545
- Registered voters: 97,825

New York's 4th State Assembly district is one of the 150 districts in the New York State Assembly. It has been represented by Democrat Rebecca Kassay since 2025, defeating incumbent Edward Flood.

== Geography ==
=== 2020s ===
District 4 is in Suffolk County. The district includes portions of the town of Brookhaven including Belle Terre, Coram, Gordon Heights, Old Field, Poquott, Port Jefferson and Setauket. Stony Brook University is within this district.

The district is entirely within New York's 1st congressional district, and overlaps the 1st and 3rd districts of the New York State Senate.

=== 2010s ===
District 4 is in Suffolk County. The district includes portions of the town of Brookhaven including Belle Terre, Old Field, Poquott, and Port Jefferson. Stony Brook University is within this district.

== Recent election results ==
=== 2026 ===
2026 New York State Assembly election, District 4
Party	Candidate	Votes	%
Democratic	Rebecca Kassay (incumbent)		
Republican	William Sussman		
Conservative	William Sussman		
Total	William Sussman		
Write-in			
Total votes			

=== 2024 ===
2024 New York State Assembly election, District 4
Primary election
Party	Candidate	Votes	%
Democratic	Rebecca Kassay	3,479	64.1
Democratic	Skyler Johnson	1,951	35.9
Write-in		0	0.0
Total votes		5,430	100
General election
Democratic	Rebecca Kassay	30,795	50.7
Republican	Edward Flood	26,631	
Conservative	Edward Flood	3,333	
Total	Edward Flood (incumbent)	29,964	49.3
Write-in		36	0.0
Total votes		60,795	100.0
Democratic gain from Republican			

=== 2022 ===
2022 New York State Assembly election, District 4
Primary election
Party	Candidate	Votes	%
Republican	Edward Flood	2,515	51.4
Republican	Thomas Wiermann	2,380	48.6
Write-in		0	0.0
Total votes		4,895	100.0
General election
Republican	Edward Flood	21,038	
Conservative	Edward Flood	3,161	
Total	Edward Flood	24,199	50.7
Democratic	Steven Englebright	22,128	
Working Families	Steven Englebright	1,375	
Total	Steven Englebright (incumbent)	23,503	49.3
Write-in		7	0.0
Total votes		47,709	100.0
Republican gain from Democratic			

=== 2020 ===
2020 New York State Assembly election, District 4
Party	Candidate	Votes	%
Democratic	Steven Englebright	31,138	
Working Families	Steven Englebright	1,839	
Independence	Steven Englebright	789	
Total	Steven Englebright (incumbent)	33,766	55.2
Republican	Michael Ross	24,053	
Conservative	Michael Ross	2,888	
Total	Michael Ross	26,941	44.1
Libertarian	Adam Fischer-Gledhill	441	0.7
Write-in		7	0.0
Total votes		61,155	100.0
Democratic hold			

=== 2018 ===
2018 New York State Assembly election, District 4
Party	Candidate	Votes	%
Democratic	Steven Englebright	26,009	
Independence	Steven Englebright	772	
Working Families	Steven Englebright	641	
Women's Equality	Steven Englebright	311	
Total	Steven Englebright (incumbent)	27,733	60.6
Republican	Christian Kalinowski	15,828	
Conservative	Christian Kalinowski	2,191	
Total	Christian Kalinowski	18,019	39.4
Write-in		7	0.0
Total votes		45,759	100.0
Democratic hold			

=== 2016 ===
2016 New York State Assembly election, District 4
Party	Candidate	Votes	%
Democratic	Steven Englebright	29,051	
Independence	Steven Englebright	1,490	
Working Families	Steven Englebright	1,400	
Total	Steven Englebright (incumbent)	31,941	59.2
Republican	Steven Weissbard	18,811	
Conservative	Steven Weissbard	3,183	
Total	Steven Weissbard	21,994	40.8
Write-in		31	0.0
Total votes		53,966	100.0
Democratic hold			

=== 2014 ===
2014 New York State Assembly election, District 4
Party	Candidate	Votes	%
Democratic	Steven Englebright	14,229	
Working Families	Steven Englebright	1,132	
Independence	Steven Englebright	1,022	
Total	Steven Englebright (incumbent)	16,383	58.1
Republican	Christopher Keegan	9,491	
Conservative	Christopher Keegan	2,337	
Total	Christopher Keegan	11,828	41.9
Write-in		5	0.0
Total votes		28,216	100.0
Democratic hold			

=== 2012 ===
2012 New York State Assembly election, District 4
Party	Candidate	Votes	%
Democratic	Steven Englebright	25,613	
Working Families	Steven Englebright	1,766	
Independence	Steven Englebright	1,274	
Total	Steven Englebright (incumbent)	28,653	62.8
Republican	Deborah McKee	14,033	
Conservative	Deborah McKee	2,957	
Total	Deborah McKee	16,990	37.2
Write-in		11	0.0
Total votes		45,654	100.0
Democratic hold			

=== 2010 ===
2010 New York State Assembly election, District 4
Party	Candidate	Votes	%
Democratic	Steven Englebright	17,654	
Independence	Steven Englebright	1,734	
Working Families	Steven Englebright	1,148	
Total	Steven Englebright (incumbent)	20,446	56.2
Republican	Deborah McKee	12,513	
Conservative	Deborah McKee	3,459	
Total	Deborah McKee	15,972	43.8
Write-in		11	0.0
Total votes		36,432	100.0
Democratic hold			
