= Rebecca Kassay =

American politician (born 1989)

Member of the New York State Assembly for the 4th district
- Incumbent
- Assumed office January 1, 2025
- Preceded by: Ed Flood

Personal details
- Born: June 20, 1989 (age 37) Stony Brook, New York, U.S.
- Party: Democratic
- Other political affiliations: Action (2022)
- Spouse: Andrew Thomas
- Education: State University of New York at New Paltz
- Website: nyassembly.gov/mem/Rebecca-Kassay

Rebecca Kassay is an American politician who has served in the New York State Assembly representing the 4th District since 2025. A Democrat, she represents part of Suffolk County.

== Early life ==
Rebecca Kassay was born in Stony Brook, New York. She was raised in St. James. Kassay earned a bachelor's degree from the State University of New York at New Paltz in 2010.

== Political career ==
Kassay previously served as deputy mayor of Port Jefferson. She was elected a Village trustee in Port Jefferson in 2020.

=== New York State Assembly ===
In the 2024 New York State Assembly election, she unseated Republican Ed Flood.

New York State Assembly
Preceded by Ed Flood	Member of the New York Assembly from the 4th District; 2025–present	Incumbent
