= New York's 111th State Assembly district =

American legislative district

Assemblymember
Angelo Santabarbara; D–Rotterdam

New York's 111th State Assembly district is one of the 150 districts in the New York State Assembly. It has been represented by Angelo Santabarbara since 2013.

== Geography ==
=== 2020s ===
District 111 contains portions of Montgomery and Schenectady Counties. Most of the city of Schenectady is included, as well as the city of Amsterdam and the towns of Rotterdam, Princetown, Duanesburg, and Florida.

The district is entirely within New York's 20th congressional district and overlaps (partially) with the 44th and 46th districts of the New York State Senate.

=== 2010s ===
District 111 contains the entirety of Montgomery County, and portions of Schenectady and Albany counties. Portions of the city of Schenectady are included

== Recent election results ==
=== 2026 ===
2026 New York State Assembly election, District 111
Party	Candidate	Votes	%
Democratic	Angelo Santabarbara		
People First	Angelo Santabarbara		
Total	Angelo Santabarbara (incumbent)		
Republican	Nicholas Sokaris		
Conservative	Nicholas Sokaris		
Total	Nicholas Sokaris		
Write-in			
Total votes			

=== 2024 ===
2024 New York State Assembly election, District 111
Party	Candidate	Votes	%
Democratic	Angelo Santabarbara	29,848	
People First	Angelo Santabarbara	994	
Total	Angelo Santabarbara (incumbent)	30,842	62.2
Republican	Joseph Mastroianni	15,705	
Conservative	Joseph Mastroianni	2,984	
Total	Joseph Mastroianni	18,689	37.7
Write-in		73	0.1
Total votes		49,604	100.0
Democratic hold			

=== 2022 ===
2022 New York State Assembly election, District 111
Primary election
Party	Candidate	Votes	%
Democratic	Angelo Santabarbara (incumbent)	3,849	65.9
Democratic	Justin Chaires	1,968	33.7
Write-in		21	0.3
Total votes		5,838	100.0
Republican	Joseph Mastroianni	1,778	54.1
Republican	Michael Arbige	1,491	45.4
Write-in		17	0.5
Total votes		3,286	100.0
Conservative	Joseph Mastroianni	389	51.9
Conservative	Angelo Santabarbara (incumbent)	355	47.3
Write-in		6	0.8
Total votes		750	100.0
Working Families	Robert Menzies	67	61.5
Working Families	Justin Chaires	39	35.7
Write-in		3	2.8
Total votes		109	100.0
General election
Democratic	Angelo Santabarbara	19,413	
Independence	Angelo Santabarbara	797	
Total	Angelo Santabarbara (incumbent)	20,210	54.3
Republican	Joseph Mastroianni	13,590	
Conservative	Joseph Mastroianni	2,615	
Total	Joseph Mastroianni	16,205	43.5
Working Families	Robert Menzies	794	2.1
Write-in		34	0.1
Total votes		37,243	100.0
Democratic hold			

=== 2020 ===
2020 New York State Assembly election, District 111
Primary election
Party	Candidate	Votes	%
Conservative	Angelo Santabarbara (incumbent)	390	52.1
Conservative	Paul DeLorenzo	357	47.7
Write-in		2	0.2
Total votes		749	100
General election
Democratic	Angelo Santabarbara	27,048	
Conservative	Angelo Santabarbara	4,613	
Independence	Angelo Santabarbara	1,256	
Total	Angelo Santabarbara (incumbent)	32,917	60.1
Republican	Paul DeLorenzo	21,821	39.8
Write-in		46	0.1
Total votes		54,784	100.0
Democratic hold			

=== 2018 ===
2018 New York State Assembly election, District 111
Primary election
Party	Candidate	Votes	%
Green	Brian McGarry	8	36.4
Write-in		8	36.4
Green	Angelo Santabarbara (incumbent, write-in)	4	18.2
Green	Cynthia Nixon (write-in)	2	9.0
Total votes		22	100
General election
Democratic	Angelo Santabarbara	19,633	
Working Families	Angelo Santabarbara	1,044	
Independence	Angelo Santabarbara	1,035	
Women's Equality	Angelo Santabarbara	296	
Reform	Angelo Santabarbara	167	
Total	Angelo Santabarbara (incumbent)	22,175	54.3
Republican	Brian McGarry	15,389	
Conservative	Brian McGarry	2,925	
Green	Brian McGarry	341	
Total	Brian McGarry	18,655	45.7
Write-in		13	0.0
Total votes		40,843	100.0
Democratic hold			

=== 2016 ===
2016 New York State Assembly election, District 111
Party	Candidate	Votes	%
Democratic	Angelo Santabarbara	25,971	
Working Families	Angelo Santabarbara	2,009	
Independence	Angelo Santabarbara	1,785	
Women's Equality	Angelo Santabarbara	432	
Total	Angelo Santabarbara (incumbent)	30,197	62.7
Republican	Peter Vroman	14,613	
Conservative	Peter Vroman	3,094	
Reform	Peter Vroman	224	
Total	Peter Vroman	17,931	37.3
Write-in		19	0.0
Total votes		48,147	100.0
Democratic hold			

=== 2014 ===
2014 New York State Assembly election, District 111
Party	Candidate	Votes	%
Democratic	Angelo Santabarbara	14,123	
Working Families	Angelo Santabarbara	1,616	
Independence	Angelo Santabarbara	1,531	
Total	Angelo Santabarbara (incumbent)	17,270	52.0
Republican	Peter Vroman	12,263	
Conservative	Peter Vroman	3,688	
Total	Peter Vroman	15,951	48.0
Write-in		21	0.0
Total votes		33,242	100.0
Democratic hold			

=== 2012 ===
2012 New York State Assembly election, District 111
Party	Candidate	Votes	%
Democratic	Angelo Santabarbara	23,515	
Working Families	Angelo Santabarbara	2,271	
Independence	Angelo Santabarbara	1,519	
Total	Angelo Santabarbara	27,305	60.6
Republican	Thomas Quackenbush	14,346	
Conservative	Thomas Quackenbush	3,368	
Total	Thomas Quackenbush	17,714	39.3
Write-in		31	0.1
Total votes		45,050	100.0
Democratic gain from Republican			
