= New York's 123rd State Assembly district =

American legislative district

Assemblymember
Donna Lupardo; D–Endwell

New York's 123rd State Assembly district is one of the 150 districts in the New York State Assembly. It has been represented by Donna Lupardo since 2005. In 2026, she announced that she would not seek re-election.

== Geography ==
=== 2010s-present ===
District 123 is entirely within Broome County. It contains the city of Binghamton and the towns of Union and Vestal.

The district is entirely within New York's 19th congressional district as well as New York's 52nd State Senate district.

== Recent election results ==
=== 2026 ===
2026 New York State Assembly election, District 123
Primary election
Party	Candidate	Votes	%
Democratic	Dan Norton	3,444	59.7
Democratic	Dan Livingston	2,315	40.1
Write-in		8	0.2
Total votes		5,767	100.0
General election
Democratic	Dan Norton		
Republican	Lynn Parker		
Conservative	Lynn Parker		
Total	Lynn Parker		
Coalition	Heather Micha		
Write-in			
Total votes			

=== 2024 ===
2024 New York State Assembly election, District 123
Party	Candidate	Votes	%
Democratic	Donna Lupardo	29,295	
Working Families	Donna Lupardo	3,146	
Total	Donna Lupardo (incumbent)	32,441	59.4
Republican	Lisa O'Keefe	19,735	
Conservative	Lisa O'Keefe	2,139	
Economic Renewal	Lisa O'Keefe	275	
Total	Lisa O'Keefe	22,149	40.5
Write-in		64	0.1
Total votes		54,654	100.0
Democratic hold			

=== 2022 ===
2022 New York State Assembly election, District 116
Primary election
Party	Candidate	Votes	%
Republican	Sophia Resciniti	2,738	60.6
Republican	Robin Alpaugh	1,776	39.3
Write-in		6	0.1
Total votes		4,520	100.0
General election
Democratic	Donna Lupardo	20,212	
Working Families	Donna Lupardo	2,204	
Total	Donna Lupardo (incumbent)	22,416	55.2
Republican	Sophia Resciniti	18,127	44.7
Write-in		30	0.1
Total votes		40,573	100.0
Democratic hold			

=== 2020 ===
2020 New York State Assembly election, District 123
Party	Candidate	Votes	%
Democratic	Donna Lupardo	34,148	
Working Families	Donna Lupardo	7,255	
Total	Donna Lupardo (incumbent)	41,403	99.2
Write-in		332	0.8
Total votes		41,735	100.0
Democratic hold			

=== 2018 ===
2018 New York State Assembly election, District 123
Party	Candidate	Votes	%
Democratic	Donna Lupardo (incumbent)	31,800	98.9
Write-in		364	1.1
Total votes		32,164	100.0
Democratic hold			

=== 2016 ===
2016 New York State Assembly election, District 123
Party	Candidate	Votes	%
Democratic	Donna Lupardo	29,847	
Working Families	Donna Lupardo	2,766	
Total	Donna Lupardo (incumbent)	32,613	63.1
Republican	Dorollo Nixon Jr.	15,879	
Conservative	Dorollo Nixon Jr.	1,937	
Independence	Dorollo Nixon Jr.	926	
Reform	Dorollo Nixon Jr.	331	
Total	Dorollo Nixon Jr.	19,073	36.9
Write-in		39	0.0
Total votes		51,725	100.0
Democratic hold			

=== 2014 ===
2014 New York State Assembly election, District 123
Party	Candidate	Votes	%
Democratic	Donna Lupardo	19,327	
Working Families	Donna Lupardo	3,829	
Total	Donna Lupardo (incumbent)	23,156	99.4
Write-in		131	0.6
Total votes		23,287	100.0
Democratic hold			

=== 2012 ===
2012 New York State Assembly election, District 123
Party	Candidate	Votes	%
Democratic	Donna Lupardo	27,845	
Working Families	Donna Lupardo	2,410	
Total	Donna Lupardo (incumbent)	30,255	61.9
Republican	Julie Lewis	16,227	
Conservative	Julie Lewis	1,414	
Independence	Julie Lewis	917	
Total	Julie Lewis	18,558	38.0
Write-in		26	0.1
Total votes		48,839	100.0
Democratic hold			
