= Ed Flood =

American politician

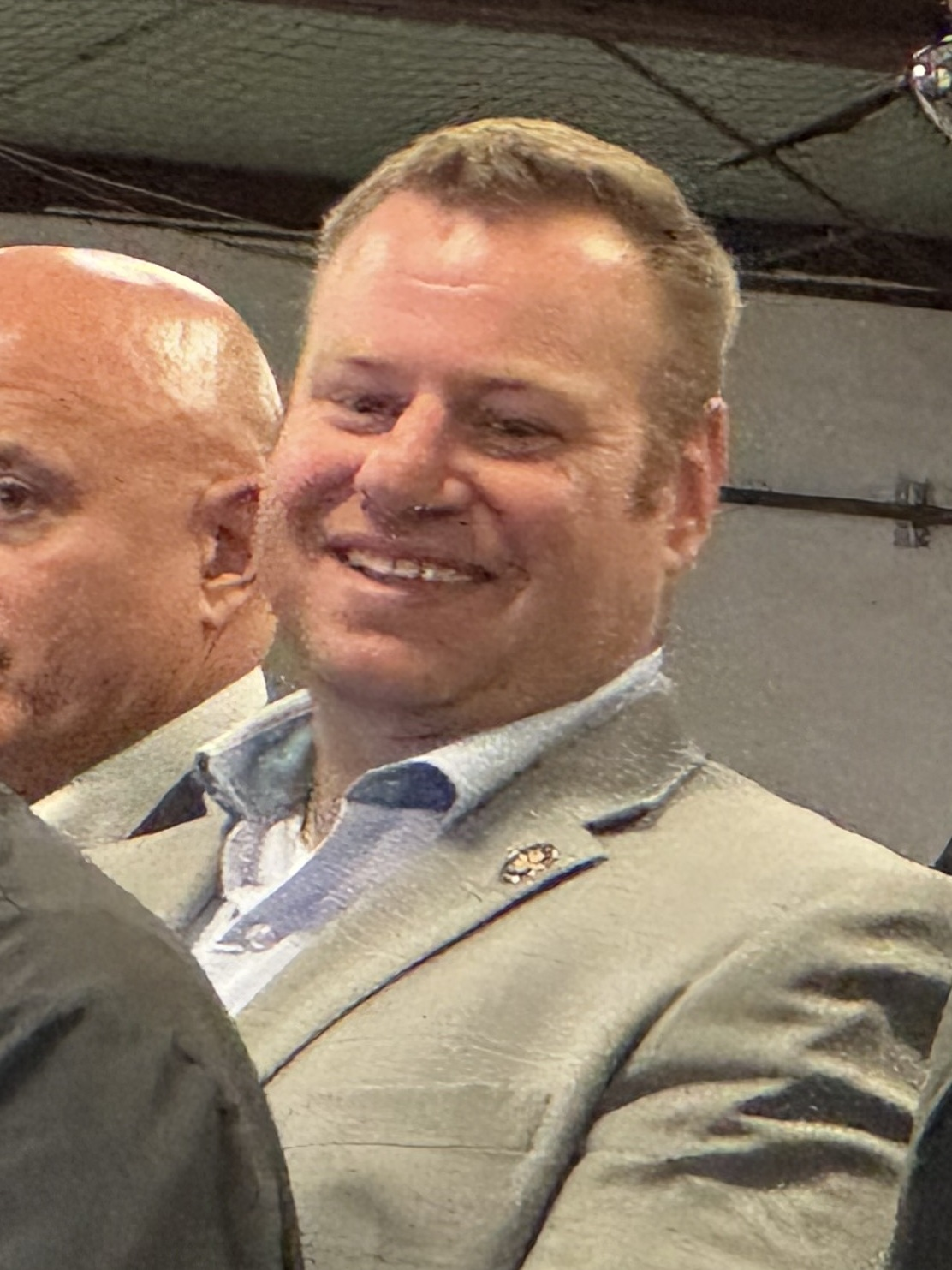
- Flood in 2024

Member of the New York State Assembly from the 4th district
- In office January 1, 2023 – December 31, 2024
- Preceded by: Steve Englebright
- Succeeded by: Rebecca Kassay

Personal details
- Party: Republican
- Website: Campaign website Official website

Edward A. Flood is an American politician who is the assemblyman for New York's 4th assembly district. A Republican, he is a resident of Port Jefferson Station, New York. He was first elected in 2022, defeating 30-year incumbent Steve Englebright in a close race.

Following his victory, Flood praised Englebright for having a clean ethical record, and stated that he wanted to continue Englebright's focus on environmental issues.

In April 2023, Flood publicly criticized Stony Brook University's new proposed parking plan, a plan which would create a tiered system where lots closest to the University would cost more than those that are further away.

Flood sat on the Committee on Banks, Committee on Children and Families, Committee on Codes, Committee on Environmental Conservation, Committee on Higher Education, and the Committee on Judiciary.

In September 2024, Flood, previously a licensed attorney, was disbarred from the practice of law by the New York Appellate Division.

In the 2024 New York State Assembly election, he was unseated by Democrat Rebecca Kassay.
