= Dan Norton (politician) =

American politician

Member-elect of the New York State Assembly from the 123rd district
- Assuming office January 2027
- Succeeding: Donna Lupardo

Personal details
- Party: Democratic

Dan Norton is an American politician. A member of the Democratic Party, he is the member-elect for the 123rd district of the New York State Assembly.
