= Carrie Woerner =

American politician (born 1962)

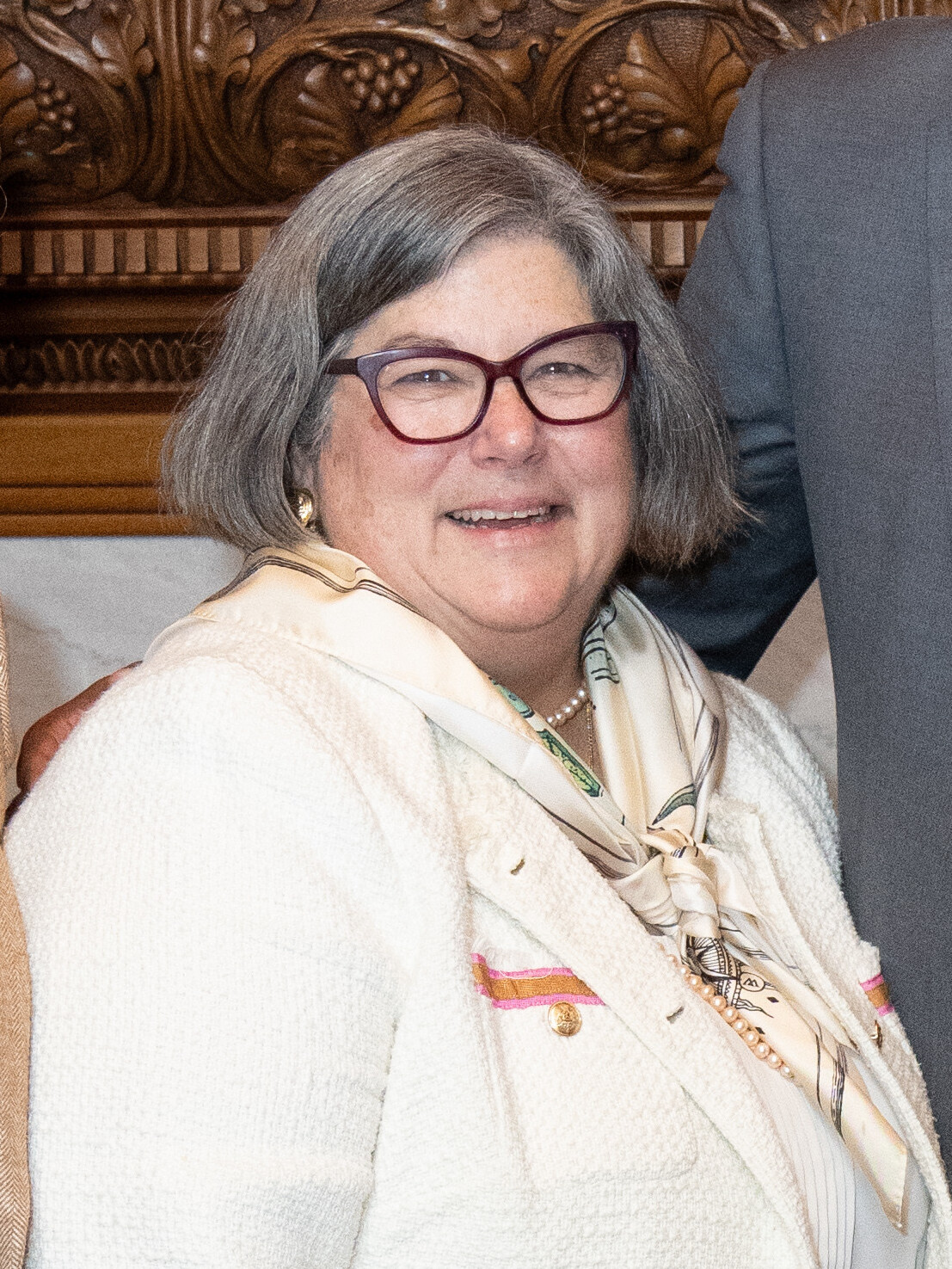

Member of the New York State Assembly from the 113th district
- Incumbent
- Assumed office January 1, 2015
- Preceded by: Tony Jordan

Chair of the New York State Assembly Small Business Committee
- Incumbent
- Assumed office January 8, 2024
- Preceded by: Al Stirpe

Chair of the New York State Assembly Libraries and Education Technology Committee
- In office January 1, 2023 – January 8, 2024
- Preceded by: Kimberly Jean-Pierre
- Succeeded by: Angelo Santabarbara

Village Trustee of Round Lake, New York
- In office 2008–2012

Personal details
- Born: April 7, 1962 (age 64)
- Party: Democratic
- Education: Carnegie-Mellon University (BA); Santa Clara University (MBA)
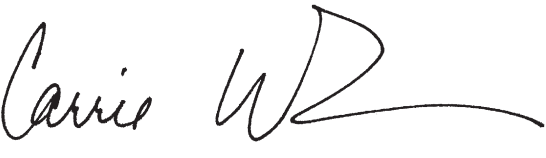
- Signature
- Website: Official website

Caroline Caird Woerner (born April 7, 1962) is the Assembly member for the 113th District of the New York State Assembly. She is a Democrat. The district includes portions of Saratoga, Warren and Washington Counties.

== Life and career ==
A graduate of Carnegie-Mellon University and Santa Clara University, Woerner had a thirty-year career in software development before entering politics. She founded MeetMax Conference Software, located in Saratoga Springs.

Woerner served as a Round Lake Village Trustee from 2008 to 2012, and was a member of the Town of Malta Planning Board from 2008 to 2014. She has been active in historic preservation efforts throughout Saratoga Springs and the surrounding area.

== New York Assembly ==
In 2012, Woerner first ran for the Assembly, but lost to incumbent Tony Jordan by a 53% to 47% margin. In 2014, Jordan was not a candidate for re-election after winning election as Washington County District Attorney in 2013. Woerner however, decided to run again and this time prevailed over Republican Steve Stallmer by a 52% to 48% margin.

She was seated on January 1, 2015. As of January 2023, Assemblywoman Woerner is the Chair of the Assembly Libraries and Education Technology Committee.

Political offices
Preceded by Tony Jordan	New York Assembly, 113th District; 2015–present	Incumbent
