= New York's 113th State Assembly district =

American legislative district

Assemblymember
Carrie Woerner; D–Round Lake

New York's 113th State Assembly district is one of the 150 districts in the New York State Assembly. It has been represented by Carrie Woerner since 2015.

== Geography ==
=== 2020s ===
District 113 contains portions of Saratoga, Washington, and Warren counties. The cities of Mechanicville, Saratoga Springs and Glen Falls, and the towns of Gansevoort, Moreau, Fort Edward, Greenwich, Malta, Northumberland, Saratoga, Stillwater and Wilton are included in the district.

The district overlaps with New York's 20th and 21st congressional districts, as well as the 43rd, 44th and 45th districts of the New York State Senate.

=== 2010s ===
District 113 contains portions of Saratoga and Washington counties. The city of Saratoga Springs is included in the district.

== Recent election results ==
=== 2026 ===
2026 New York State Assembly election, District 113
Party	Candidate	Votes	%
Democratic	Carrie Woerner (incumbent)		
Republican	Allen Caruso		
Conservative	Allen Caruso		
Vote Affordable	Allen Caruso		
Total	Allen Caruso		
Working Families	Thomas Kenny		
No Kings	Thomas Kenny		
Total	Thomas Kenny		
Write-in			
Total votes			

=== 2024 ===
2024 New York State Assembly election, District 113
Party	Candidate	Votes	%
Democratic	Carrie Woerner (incumbent)	38,348	54.9
Republican	Jeremy Messina	27,873	
Conservative	Jeremy Messina	3,717	
Total	Jeremy Messina	31,540	45.1
Write-in		29	0.0
Total votes		69,917	100.0
Democratic hold			

=== 2022 ===
2022 New York State Assembly election, District 113
Party	Candidate	Votes	%
Democratic	Carrie Woerner (incumbent)	29,233	53.0
Republican	David Catalfamo	22,570	
Conservative	David Catalfamo	3,304	
Total	David Catalfamo	25,874	46.9
Write-in		27	0.1
Total votes		55,134	100.0
Democratic hold			

=== 2020 ===
2020 New York State Assembly election, District 113
Party	Candidate	Votes	%
Democratic	Carrie Woerner	38,072	
Independence	Carrie Woerner	2,013	
SAM	Carrie Woerner	88	
Total	Carrie Woerner (incumbent)	40,173	55.1
Republican	David Catalfamo	29,213	
Conservative	David Catalfamo	3,513	
Total	David Catalfamo	32,726	44.9
Write-in		27	0.2
Total votes		72,926	100.0
Democratic hold			

=== 2018 ===
2018 New York State Assembly election, District 113
Party	Candidate	Votes	%
Democratic	Carrie Woerner	28,065	
Independence	Carrie Woerner	2,277	
Total	Carrie Woerner (incumbent)	30,342	56.8
Republican	Morgan Zegers	19,673	
Conservative	Morgan Zegers	3,106	
Reform	Morgan Zegers	266	
Total	Morgan Zegers	23,045	43.2
Write-in		27	0.0
Total votes		53,405	100.0
Democratic hold			

=== 2016 ===
2016 New York State Assembly election, District 113
Primary election
Party	Candidate	Votes	%
Republican	Christopher Boyark	1,594	61.9
Republican	Gerard Moser	981	38.1
Write-in		0	0.0
Total votes		2,575	100
General election
Democratic	Carrie Woerner	30,429	
Independence	Carrie Woerner	3,201	
Total	Carrie Woerner (incumbent)	33,630	56.4
Republican	Christopher Boyark	22,368	
Conservative	Christopher Boyark	3,381	
Reform	Christopher Boyark	263	
Total	Christopher Boyark	26,012	43.6
Write-in		36	0.0
Total votes		59,678	100.0
Democratic hold			

=== 2014 ===
2014 New York State Assembly election, District 113
Party	Candidate	Votes	%
Democratic	Carrie Woerner	16,584	
Working Families	Carrie Woerner	2,934	
Total	Carrie Woerner	19,518	52.4
Republican	Steve Stallmer	13,892	
Conservative	Steve Stallmer	2,969	
Independence	Steve Stallmer	876	
Total	Steve Stallmer	17,737	47.6
Write-in		37	0.0
Total votes		37,292	100.0
Democratic gain from Republican			

=== 2012 ===
2012 New York State Assembly election, District 113
Party	Candidate	Votes	%
Republican	Tony Jordan	23,801	
Conservative	Tony Jordan	3,212	
Independence	Tony Jordan	1,620	
Total	Tony Jordan (incumbent)	28,633	52.8
Democratic	Carrie Woerner	23,629	
Working Families	Carrie Woerner	1,971	
Total	Carrie Woerner	25,600	47.2
Write-in		14	0.0
Total votes		54,247	100.0
Republican hold			
