= New York's 139th State Assembly district =

American legislative district

Assemblymember
Stephen Hawley; R–Batavia

New York's 139th State Assembly district is one of the 150 districts in the New York State Assembly. It has been represented by Stephen Hawley since 2005.

== Geography ==
=== 2020s ===
District 139 contains all of Genesee and Orleans counties and portions of Monroe and Erie counties.

=== 2010s ===
District 139 contained all of Genesee County and portions of Monroe and Orleans counties.

== Recent election results ==
=== 2026 ===
2026 New York State Assembly election, District 139
Party	Candidate	Votes	%
Republican	Stephen Hawley		
Conservative	Stephen Hawley		
Total	Stephen Hawley (incumbent)		
Democratic	Sarah Wolcott		
Write-in			
Total votes			

=== 2024 ===
2024 New York State Assembly election, District 139
Party	Candidate	Votes	%
Republican	Stephen Hawley	42,479	
Conservative	Stephen Hawley	7,851	
Total	Stephen Hawley (incumbent)	50,330	99.6
Write-in		204	0.4
Total votes		50,354	100.0
Republican hold			

=== 2022 ===
2022 New York State Assembly election, District 139
Party	Candidate	Votes	%
Republican	Stephen Hawley	31,960	
Conservative	Stephen Hawley	6,111	
Total	Stephen Hawley (incumbent)	38,071	76.9
Democratic	Jennifer Keys	11,428	23.1
Write-in		17	0.0
Total votes		49,516	100.0
Republican hold			

=== 2020 ===
2020 New York State Assembly election, District 139
Party	Candidate	Votes	%
Republican	Stephen Hawley	39,367	
Conservative	Stephen Hawley	6,021	
Independence	Stephen Hawley	2,746	
Total	Stephen Hawley (incumbent)	48,134	91.2
Libertarian	Mark Glogowski	4,506	8.6
Write-in		92	0.2
Total votes		52,732	100.0
Republican hold			

=== 2018 ===
2018 New York State Assembly election, District 139
Party	Candidate	Votes	%
Republican	Stephen Hawley	28,979	
Conservative	Stephen Hawley	4,900	
Independence	Stephen Hawley	1,930	
Reform	Stephen Hawley	341	
Total	Stephen Hawley (incumbent)	36,150	91.5
Libertarian	Mark Glogowski	3,291	8.3
Write-in		73	0.2
Total votes		39,514	100.0
Republican hold			

=== 2016 ===
2016 New York State Assembly election, District 139
Party	Candidate	Votes	%
Republican	Stephen Hawley	35,454	
Conservative	Stephen Hawley	6,140	
Independence	Stephen Hawley	3,542	
Reform	Stephen Hawley	458	
Total	Stephen Hawley (incumbent)	45,594	99.8
Write-in		111	0.2
Total votes		45,705	100.0
Republican hold			

=== 2014 ===
2014 New York State Assembly election, District 139
Party	Candidate	Votes	%
Republican	Stephen Hawley	21,910	
Conservative	Stephen Hawley	4,935	
Independence	Stephen Hawley	2,325	
Total	Stephen Hawley (incumbent)	29,170	95.4
Libertarian	Mark Glogowski	1,363	4.5
Write-in		32	0.1
Total votes		30,565	100.0
Republican hold			

=== 2012 ===
2012 New York State Assembly election, District 139
Party	Candidate	Votes	%
Republican	Stephen Hawley	31,430	
Conservative	Stephen Hawley	5,475	
Independence	Stephen Hawley	2,981	
Total	Stephen Hawley (incumbent)	39,886	93.1
Libertarian	Mark Glogowski	2,919	6.8
Write-in		38	0.1
Total votes		42,843	100.0
Republican hold			
