= Paula Kay =

American politician

Member of the New York State Assembly from the 100th district
- Incumbent
- Assumed office January 1, 2025
- Preceded by: Aileen Gunther

Personal details
- Party: Democratic
- Education: Wesleyan University (BA); Brooklyn Law School (JD)
- Website: Legislative website

Paula Elaine Kay is an American lawyer and politician serving as a member of the New York State Assembly for the 100th district, which contains a majority of Sullivan County and a portion of northern Orange County.

Kay is a lawyer who has served various town and planning boards throughout Sullivan County.

== New York State Assembly ==
In 2024, Kay ran for the New York State Assembly in the 100th district, where incumbent Democrat Aileen Gunther was retiring. She was unopposed in the Democratic primary election and appeared on the general election ballot under the Democrat and People Over Politics party lines. She defeated Republican and Conservative nominee Louis Ingrassia Jr. with 52.6% of the vote.

== Electoral history ==
2024 New York State Assembly election, District 100
Party	Candidate	Votes	%
Democratic	Paula Kay	24,516	
People Over Politics	Paula Kay	2,557	
Total	Paula Kay	27,073	52.6
Republican	Louis Ingrassia Jr.	21,583	
Conservative	Louis Ingrassia Jr.	2,812	
Total	Louis Ingrassia Jr.	24,395	47.4
Write-in		24	0.0
Total votes		51,492	100.0
Democratic hold			
