= Michael Gentile =

American politician

Member-elect of the New York State Assembly from the 119th district
- Assuming office January 2027
- Succeeding: Marianne Buttenschon

Personal details
- Party: Republican

Michael Gentile is an American politician. A member of the Republican Party, he is the member-elect for the 119th district of the New York State Assembly.
