= New York's 124th State Assembly district =

American legislative district

Assemblymember
| Christopher Friend; R–Big Flats |

New York's 124th State Assembly district is one of the 150 districts in the New York State Assembly. It has been represented by Christopher Friend since 2011.

== Geography ==
District 124 contains all of Tioga County and portions of Broome and Chemung counties.

== Recent election results ==
=== 2026 ===
2026 New York State Assembly election, District 124
| Party | Candidate | Votes | % |
|---|---|---|---|
| Republican | Christopher Friend | | |
| Conservative | Christopher Friend | | |
| Total | Christopher Friend (incumbent) | | |
| Democratic | Andrew Fagan | | |
| Working Families | Andrew Fagan | | |
| Total | Andrew Fagan | | |
| Write-in | | | |
| Total votes | | | |

=== 2024 ===
2024 New York State Assembly election, District 124
| Party | Candidate | Votes | % |
|---|---|---|---|
| Republican | Christopher Friend | 40,434 | |
| Conservative | Christopher Friend | 6,139 | |
| Total | Christopher Friend (incumbent) | 46,573 | 99.3 |
| Write-in | | 344 | 0.7 |
| Total votes | | 46,917 | 100.0 |
| Republican hold | | | |

=== 2022 ===
2022 New York State Assembly election, District 124
| Party | Candidate | Votes | % |
|---|---|---|---|
| Republican | Christopher Friend | 32,252 | |
| Conservative | Christopher Friend | 4,312 | |
| Total | Christopher Friend (incumbent) | 36,564 | 99.4 |
| Write-in | | 239 | 0.6 |
| Total votes | | 36,803 | 100.0 |
| Republican hold | | | |

=== 2020 ===
2020 New York State Assembly election, District 124
Primary election
| Party | Candidate | Votes | % |
|---|---|---|---|
| Republican | Christopher Friend (incumbent) | 6,014 | 74.5 |
| Republican | RC Ike | 2,048 | 25.4 |
| Write-in | | 10 | 0.1 |
| Total votes | | 8,072 | 100 |
General election
| Republican | Christopher Friend | 33,791 | |
| Conservative | Christopher Friend | 2,681 | |
| Independence | Christopher Friend | 1,504 | |
| Total | Christopher Friend (incumbent) | 37,976 | 64.3 |
| Democratic | Randy Reid | 21,053 | 35.7 |
| Write-in | | 11 | 0.0 |
| Total votes | | 59,040 | 100.0 |
| Republican hold | | | |

=== 2018 ===
2018 New York State Assembly election, District 124
Primary election
| Party | Candidate | Votes | % |
|---|---|---|---|
| Democratic | Bill Batrowny | 2,597 | 53.8 |
| Democratic | Randy Reid | 2,226 | 46.2 |
| Write-in | | 0 | 0.0 |
| Total votes | | 4,823 | 100 |
General election
| Republican | Christopher Friend | 25,317 | |
| Conservative | Christopher Friend | 2,066 | |
| Independence | Christopher Friend | 910 | |
| Total | Christopher Friend (incumbent) | 28,393 | 62.0 |
| Democratic | Bill Batrowny | 16,418 | |
| Working Families | Bill Batrowny | 922 | |
| Total | Bill Batrowny | 17,340 | 37.9 |
| Write-in | | 45 | 0.1 |
| Total votes | | 45,678 | 100.0 |
| Republican hold | | | |

=== 2016 ===
2016 New York State Assembly election, District 124
| Party | Candidate | Votes | % |
|---|---|---|---|
| Republican | Christopher Friend | 29,976 | |
| Conservative | Christopher Friend | 2,859 | |
| Independence | Christopher Friend | 1,291 | |
| Reform | Christopher Friend | 218 | |
| Total | Christopher Friend (incumbent) | 34,344 | 65.3 |
| Democratic | Bill Batrowny | 16,662 | |
| Working Families | Bill Batrowny | 1,231 | |
| Women's Equality | Bill Batrowny | 326 | |
| Total | Bill Batrowny | 18,219 | 34.7 |
| Write-in | | 9 | 0.1 |
| Total votes | | 52,572 | 100.0 |
| Republican hold | | | |

=== 2014 ===
2014 New York State Assembly election, District 124
| Party | Candidate | Votes | % |
|---|---|---|---|
| Republican | Christopher Friend | 22,356 | |
| Conservative | Christopher Friend | 2,661 | |
| Independence | Christopher Friend | 1,981 | |
| Stop Common Core | Christopher Friend | 441 | |
| Total | Christopher Friend (incumbent) | 27,439 | 99.9 |
| Write-in | | 39 | 0.1 |
| Total votes | | 27,478 | 100.0 |
| Republican hold | | | |

=== 2012 ===
2012 New York State Assembly election, District 124
| Party | Candidate | Votes | % |
|---|---|---|---|
| Republican | Christopher Friend | 30,814 | |
| Independence | Christopher Friend | 3,848 | |
| Conservative | Christopher Friend | 3,127 | |
| Total | Christopher Friend (incumbent) | 37,789 | 99.9 |
| Write-in | | 43 | 0.1 |
| Total votes | | 37,832 | 100.0 |
| Republican hold | | | |
