= New York's 88th State Assembly district =

American legislative district

Assemblymember
| Amy Paulin; D–Scarsdale |

New York's 88th State Assembly district is one of the 150 districts in the New York State Assembly. It has been represented by Democrat Amy Paulin since 2001.

== Geography ==
District 88 is in Westchester County. It contains Scarsdale, Eastchester, Tuckahoe, Bronxville, Pelham, Pelham Manor, and parts of New Rochelle and White Plains.

The district is entirely within New York's 16th congressional district, and partially overlaps the 34th and 37th districts of the New York State Senate.

== Recent election results ==
=== 2026 ===
2026 New York State Assembly election, District 88
| Party | Candidate | Votes | % |
|---|---|---|---|
| Democratic | Amy Paulin | | |
| Working Families | Amy Paulin | | |
| Total | Amy Paulin (incumbent) | | |
| Write-in | | | |
| Total votes | | | |

=== 2024 ===
2024 New York State Assembly election, District 88
| Party | Candidate | Votes | % |
|---|---|---|---|
| Democratic | Amy Paulin | 42,979 | |
| Working Families | Amy Paulin | 1,967 | |
| Total | Amy Paulin (incumbent) | 44,946 | 65.1 |
| Republican | Thomas Fix Jr. | 22,341 | |
| Conservative | Thomas Fix Jr. | 1,724 | |
| Total | Thomas Fix Jr. | 24,065 | 34.9 |
| Write-in | | 29 | 0.0 |
| Total votes | | 69,040 | 100.0 |
| Democratic hold | | | |

=== 2022 ===
2022 New York State Assembly election, District 88
| Party | Candidate | Votes | % |
|---|---|---|---|
| Democratic | Amy Paulin | 32,609 | |
| Working Families | Amy Paulin | 1,731 | |
| Total | Amy Paulin (incumbent) | 34,340 | 64.1 |
| Republican | Thomas Fix Jr. | 17,942 | |
| Conservative | Thomas Fix Jr. | 1,243 | |
| Total | Thomas Fix Jr. | 19,185 | 35.9 |
| Write-in | | 15 | 0.0 |
| Total votes | | 53,540 | 100.0 |
| Democratic hold | | | |

=== 2020 ===
2020 New York State Assembly election, District 88
| Party | Candidate | Votes | % |
|---|---|---|---|
| Democratic | Amy Paulin | 44,370 | |
| Working Families | Amy Paulin | 5,184 | |
| SAM | Amy Paulin | 307 | |
| Total | Amy Paulin (incumbent) | 49,861 | 99.5 |
| Write-in | | 245 | 0.5 |
| Total votes | | 50,106 | 100.0 |
| Democratic hold | | | |

=== 2018 ===
2018 New York State Assembly election, District 88
| Party | Candidate | Votes | % |
|---|---|---|---|
| Democratic | Amy Paulin | 36,379 | |
| Working Families | Amy Paulin | 1,921 | |
| Women's Equality | Amy Paulin | 720 | |
| Reform | Amy Paulin | 471 | |
| Total | Amy Paulin (incumbent) | 39,491 | 99.2 |
| Write-in | | 320 | 0.8 |
| Total votes | | 39,811 | 100.0 |
| Democratic hold | | | |

=== 2016 ===
2016 New York State Assembly election, District 88
| Party | Candidate | Votes | % |
|---|---|---|---|
| Democratic | Amy Paulin | 39,487 | |
| Working Families | Amy Paulin | 1,514 | |
| Independence | Amy Paulin | 971 | |
| Women's Equality | Amy Paulin | 555 | |
| Total | Amy Paulin (incumbent) | 42,527 | 84.6 |
| Conservative | Anthony DeCintio Jr. | 7,643 | 15.2 |
| Write-in | | 74 | 0.2 |
| Total votes | | 50,244 | 100.0 |
| Democratic hold | | | |

=== 2014 ===
2014 New York State Assembly election, District 88
| Party | Candidate | Votes | % |
|---|---|---|---|
| Democratic | Amy Paulin | 20,498 | |
| Working Families | Amy Paulin | 2,915 | |
| Total | Amy Paulin (incumbent) | 23,413 | 99.3 |
| Write-in | | 168 | 0.7 |
| Total votes | | 23,581 | 100.0 |
| Democratic hold | | | |

=== 2012 ===
2012 New York State Assembly election, District 88
| Party | Candidate | Votes | % |
|---|---|---|---|
| Democratic | Amy Paulin | 36,031 | |
| Independence | Amy Paulin | 2,394 | |
| Working Families | Amy Paulin | 2,190 | |
| Total | Amy Paulin (incumbent) | 40,615 | 99.5 |
| Write-in | | 193 | 0.5 |
| Total votes | | 40,808 | 100.0 |
| Democratic hold | | | |

=== 2010 ===
2010 New York State Assembly election, District 88
| Party | Candidate | Votes | % |
|---|---|---|---|
| Democratic | Amy Paulin | 20,539 | |
| Independence | Amy Paulin | 1,084 | |
| Working Families | Amy Paulin | 916 | |
| Total | Amy Paulin (incumbent) | 22,539 | 60.9 |
| Republican | Rene Atayan | 12,698 | |
| Conservative | Rene Atayan | 1,794 | |
| Total | Rene Atayan | 14,492 | 39.1 |
| Write-in | | 4 | 0.0 |
| Total votes | | 37,035 | 100.0 |
| Democratic hold | | | |
