= New York's 108th State Assembly district =

American legislative district

Assemblymember
John McDonald III; D–Cohoes

New York's 108th State Assembly district is one of the 150 districts in the New York State Assembly. It has been represented by John McDonald III since 2013.

== Geography ==
=== 2020s ===
District 108 includes portions of Albany, Rensselaer, and Saratoga counties. It contains the cities of Cohoes, Troy and Rennselaer and the towns of East Greenbush, Hampton Manor, Defreestville, Snyder's Lake, Waterford and Wynantskill.

The district overlaps (partially) with New York's 19th and 20th congressional districts, and the 43rd and 44th districts of the New York State Senate.

=== 2010s ===
District 108 contains portions of Albany, Rensselaer, and Saratoga counties. It contains the eastern and central parts of the city of Albany and most of the city of Troy.

== Recent election results ==
=== 2026 ===
2026 New York State Assembly election, District 108
Party	Candidate	Votes	%
Democratic	John McDonald III (incumbent)		
Republican	Joseph Adamo III		
Write-in			
Total votes			

=== 2024 ===
2024 New York State Assembly election, District 108
Party	Candidate	Votes	%
Democratic	John McDonald III (incumbent)	35,851	98.8
Write-in		432	1.2
Total votes		36,283	100.0
Democratic hold			

=== 2022 ===
2022 New York State Assembly election, District 108
Party	Candidate	Votes	%
Democratic	John McDonald III (incumbent)	25,418	99.3
Write-in		181	0.7
Total votes		25,599	100.0
Democratic hold			

=== 2020 ===
2020 New York State Assembly election, District 108
Primary election
Party	Candidate	Votes	%
Democratic	John McDonald III (incumbent)	6,016	58.0
Democratic	Sam Fein	4,289	41.3
Write-in		70	0.7
Total votes		10,375	100
General election
Democratic	John McDonald III	29,885	
Independence	John McDonald III	1,623	
Total	John McDonald III (incumbent)	31,508	65.5
Republican	Petros Papanicolaou	10,797	
Conservative	Petros Papanicolaou	1,545	
Total	Petros Papanicolaou	12,342	25.7
Working Families	Sam Fein	4,233	8.8
Write-in		27	0.0
Total votes		48,110	100.0
Democratic hold			

=== 2018 ===
2018 New York State Assembly election, District 108
Party	Candidate	Votes	%
Democratic	John McDonald III	24,586	
Independence	John McDonald III	3,286	
Total	John McDonald III (incumbent)	27,872	99.4
Write-in		159	0.6
Total votes		28,031	100.0
Democratic hold			

=== 2016 ===
2016 New York State Assembly election, District 108
Party	Candidate	Votes	%
Democratic	John McDonald III	29,744	
Independence	John McDonald III	4,820	
Total	John McDonald III (incumbent)	34,564	99.5
Write-in		170	0.5
Total votes		34,734	100.0
Democratic hold			

=== 2014 ===
2014 New York State Assembly election, District 108
Party	Candidate	Votes	%
Democratic	John McDonald III	15,803	
Independence	John McDonald III	2,081	
Total	John McDonald III (incumbent)	17,884	73.4
Republican	Carl Gottstein Jr.	4,797	
Conservative	Carl Gottstein Jr.	1,447	
Law & Justice	Carl Gottstein Jr.	206	
Total	Carl Gottstein Jr.	6,450	26.5
Write-in		21	0.1
Total votes		24,355	100.0
Democratic hold			

=== 2012 ===
2012 New York State Assembly election, District 108
Primary election
Party	Candidate	Votes	%
Democratic	John McDonald III	5,045	55.2
Democratic	Carolyn McLaughlin	4,094	44.8
Write-in		0	0.0
Total votes		9,139	100
General election
Democratic	John McDonald III	25,773	
Independence	John McDonald III	2,424	
Total	John McDonald III	28,197	76.2
Working Families	Carolyn McLaughlin	7,646	20.7
Libertarian	James Campbell	1,147	3.0
Write-in		21	0.1
Total votes		36,981	100.0
Democratic hold			
