= New York's 100th State Assembly district =

American legislative district

Assemblymember
Paula Kay; D–Rock Hill

New York's 100th State Assembly district is one of the 150 districts in the New York State Assembly. It has been represented by Paula Kay since 2025, succeeding Aileen Gunther. In 2024, she announced she would not seek re-election.

== Geography ==
District 100 consists of a majority of Sullivan County, including the towns of Fallsburg, Liberty, Monticello, Rock Hill and Wurtsboro, and the city of Middletown in Orange County.

The district overlaps New York's 18th and 19th congressional districts, as well as the 42nd and 51st district of the New York State Senate.

=== 2010s ===
District 100 consists of a majority of Sullivan County, including the towns of Fallsburg, Liberty, Livingston Manor, Monticello, Rock Hill and Wurtsboro, and the city of Middletown in Orange County.

== Recent election results ==
=== 2026 ===
2026 New York State Assembly election, District 100
Party	Candidate	Votes	%
Democratic	Paula Kay		
People Over Politics	Paula Kay		
Total	Paula Kay (incumbent)		
Write-in			
Total votes			

=== 2024 ===
2024 New York State Assembly election, District 100
Primary election
Party	Candidate	Votes	%
Republican	Louis Ingrassia Jr.	1,322	60.2
Republican	Camille O'Brien	873	39.7
Write-in		3	0.1
Total votes		2,198	100.0
General election
Democratic	Paula Kay	24,516	
People Over Politics	Paula Kay	2,557	
Total	Paula Kay	27,073	52.6
Republican	Louis Ingrassia Jr.	21,583	
Conservative	Louis Ingrassia Jr.	2,812	
Total	Louis Ingrassia Jr.	24,395	47.4
Write-in		24	0.0
Total votes		51,492	100.0
Democratic hold			

=== 2022 ===
2022 New York State Assembly election, District 100
Party	Candidate	Votes	%
Democratic	Aileen Gunther	18,518	
Working Families	Aileen Gunther	1,739	
Total	Aileen Gunther (incumbent)	20,257	56.6
Republican	Lisa LaBue	13,770	
Conservative	Lisa LaBue	1,748	
Total	Lisa LaBue	15,518	43.4
Write-in		13	0.0
Total votes		35,788	100.0
Democratic hold			

=== 2020 ===
2020 New York State Assembly election, District 100
Party	Candidate	Votes	%
Democratic	Aileen Gunther	29,859	
Working Families	Aileen Gunther	5,273	
Independence	Aileen Gunther	2,397	
Total	Aileen Gunther (incumbent)	37,529	99.5
Write-in		198	0.5
Total votes		37,727	100.0
Democratic hold			

=== 2018 ===
2018 New York State Assembly election, District 100
Party	Candidate	Votes	%
Democratic	Aileen Gunther	23,187	
Working Families	Aileen Gunther	2,140	
Independence	Aileen Gunther	2,020	
Total	Aileen Gunther (incumbent)	27,347	99.4
Write-in		159	0.6
Total votes		27,506	100.0
Democratic hold			

=== 2016 ===
2016 New York State Assembly election, District 100
Party	Candidate	Votes	%
Democratic	Aileen Gunther	27,261	
Working Families	Aileen Gunther	2,964	
Independence	Aileen Gunther	2,917	
Total	Aileen Gunther (incumbent)	33,142	99.7
Write-in		114	0.3
Total votes		33,256	100.0
Democratic hold			

=== 2014 ===
2014 New York State Assembly election, District 100
Party	Candidate	Votes	%
Democratic	Aileen Gunther	14,462	
Independence	Aileen Gunther	2,588	
Working Families	Aileen Gunther	2,511	
Total	Aileen Gunther (incumbent)	19,561	99.5
Write-in		97	0.5
Total votes		19,658	100.0
Democratic hold			

=== 2012 ===
2012 New York State Assembly election, District 100
Party	Candidate	Votes	%
Democratic	Aileen Gunther	27,733	
Working Families	Aileen Gunther	2,141	
Independence	Aileen Gunther	1,425	
Total	Aileen Gunther (incumbent)	31,299	71.4
Republican	Gary Linton	10,596	
Conservative	Gary Linton	1,932	
Total	Gary Linton	12,528	28.6
Write-in		8	0.0
Total votes		43,835	100.0
Democratic hold			
