= New York's 91st State Assembly district =

American legislative district

Assemblymember
Steven Otis; D–Rye

New York's 91st State Assembly district is one of the 150 districts in the New York State Assembly. It has been represented by Steven Otis since 2013.

== Geography ==
District 91 is in Westchester County. It includes the towns of Larchmont, Mamaroneck, Rye, Rye Brook, Port Chester, and portions of New Rochelle.

The district is entirely within New York's 16th congressional district, and overlaps the 34th and 37th districts of the New York State Senate.

== Recent election results ==
=== 2026 ===
2026 New York State Assembly election, District 91
Party	Candidate	Votes	%
Democratic	Steven Otis		
Working Families	Steven Otis		
Total	Steven Otis (incumbent)		
Write-in			
Total votes			

=== 2024 ===
2024 New York State Assembly election, District 91
Party	Candidate	Votes	%
Democratic	Steven Otis	33,568	
Working Families	Steven Otis	1,529	
Total	Steven Otis (incumbent)	35,097	67.0
Republican	Anna Manger	17,333	33.0
Write-in		11	0.0
Total votes		52,441	100.0
Democratic hold			

=== 2022 ===
2022 New York State Assembly election, District 91
Party	Candidate	Votes	%
Democratic	Steven Otis	24,931	
Working Families	Steven Otis	1,946	
Total	Steven Otis (incumbent)	26,877	99.6
Write-in		103	0.4
Total votes		26,980	100.0
Democratic hold			

=== 2020 ===
2020 New York State Assembly election, District 91
Primary election
Party	Candidate	Votes	%
Democratic	Steven Otis (incumbent)	5,804	50.3
Democratic	Meg Cameron	5,720	49.6
Write-in		9	0.1
Total votes		11,533	100
General election
Democratic	Steven Otis	36,133	
Working Families	Steven Otis	3,542	
Independence	Steven Otis	1,146	
Total	Steven Otis (incumbent)	40,821	99.6
Write-in		144	0.4
Total votes		40,965	100.0
Democratic hold			

=== 2018 ===
2018 New York State Assembly election, District 91
Party	Candidate	Votes	%
Democratic	Steven Otis	28,876	
Working Families	Steven Otis	1,375	
Women's Equality	Steven Otis	607	
Total	Steven Otis (incumbent)	30,858	99.5
Write-in		156	0.5
Total votes		31,012	100.0
Democratic hold			

=== 2016 ===
2016 New York State Assembly election, District 91
Party	Candidate	Votes	%
Democratic	Steven Otis	31,576	
Working Families	Steven Otis	1,509	
Independence	Steven Otis	1,151	
Women's Equality	Steven Otis	513	
Total	Steven Otis (incumbent)	34,749	99.5
Write-in		166	0.5
Total votes		34,915	100.0
Democratic hold			

=== 2014 ===
2014 New York State Assembly election, District 91
Party	Candidate	Votes	%
Democratic	Steven Otis	14,511	
Working Families	Steven Otis	1,530	
Independence	Steven Otis	1,120	
Total	Steven Otis (incumbent)	17,161	99.6
Write-in		73	04
Total votes		17,234	100.0
Democratic hold			

=== 2012 ===
2012 New York State Assembly election, District 91
Party	Candidate	Votes	%
Democratic	Steven Otis	24,315	
Working Families	Steven Otis	959	
Independence	Steven Otis	631	
Total	Steven Otis	25,905	62.7
Republican	William Villanova	13,992	
Conservative	William Villanova	1,405	
Total	William Villanova	15,397	37.3
Write-in		13	04
Total votes		41,315	100.0
Democratic hold			
