= New York's 119th State Assembly district =

American legislative district

Assemblymember
Marianne Buttenschon; D–Marcy

New York's 119th State Assembly district is one of the 150 districts in the New York State Assembly. It has been represented by Marianne Buttenschon since 2018, replacing Anthony Brindisi.

== Geography ==
=== 2020s ===
District 119 is located within Oneida County. It includes the cities of Rome and Utica, and the towns of Floyd, Deerfield, Marcy and Whitesboro.

The district (partially) overlaps with New York's 21st and 22nd congressional districts, and is overlapped entirely under New York's 53rd State Senate district.

=== 2010s ===
District 119 contains portions of Oneida and Herkimer counties, including the cities of Rome and Utica, and the towns of Frankfort, Floyd, Marcy and Whitesboro.

== Recent election results ==
=== 2026 ===
2026 New York State Assembly election, District 119
Primary election
Party	Candidate	Votes	%
Republican	Michael Gentile	1,895	51.5
Republican	Daniel Fusco	1,778	48.4
Write-in		4	0.1
Total votes		3,677	100.0
Democratic	Jonathan Lipe	1,735	54.4
Democratic	Joseph Betar	1,454	45.6
Write-in		0	0.0
Total votes		3,189	100.0
General election
Democratic	Jonathan Lipe		
Working Families	Jonathan Lipe		
Mohawk Valley 1st	Jonathan Lipe		
Total	Jonathan Lipe		
Republican	Michael Gentile		
Conservative	Michael Gentile		
Total	Michael Gentile		
Write-in			
Total votes			100.0

=== 2024 ===
2024 New York State Assembly election, District 119
Party	Candidate	Votes	%
Democratic	Marianne Buttenschon	22,227	
Mohawk Valley 1st	Marianne Buttenschon	1,110	
Total	Marianne Buttenschon (incumbent)	23,337	50.7
Republican	Christine Esposito	20,409	
Conservative	Christine Esposito	2,220	
Total	Christine Esposito	22,629	49.2
Write-in		26	0.1
Total votes		45,992	100.0
Democratic hold			

=== 2022 ===
2022 New York State Assembly election, District 119
Party	Candidate	Votes	%
Democratic	Marianne Buttenschon	16,336	
Conservative	Marianne Buttenschon	3,014	
Total	Marianne Buttenschon (incumbent)	19,350	56.3
Republican	John Zielinski	15,022	43.7
Write-in		20	0.0
Total votes		34,392	100.0
Democratic hold			

=== 2020 ===
2020 New York State Assembly election, District 119
Party	Candidate	Votes	%
Democratic	Marianne Buttenschon	25,435	
Independence	Marianne Buttenschon	1,999	
Total	Marianne Buttenschon (incumbent)	27,434	57.3
Republican	John Zielinski	20,122	42.1
SAM	Michael Gentile	278	0.6
Write-in		20	0.0
Total votes		47,854	100.0
Democratic hold			

=== 2018 ===
2018 New York State Assembly election, District 119
Primary election
Party	Candidate	Votes	%
Republican	Dennis Bova Jr.	992	51.7
Republican	Frederick Nichols	928	47.3
Write-in		0	0.0
Total votes		1,920	100
General election
Democratic	Marianne Buttenschon	19,056	
Independence	Marianne Buttenschon	1,833	
Total	Marianne Buttenschon	20,889	55.5
Republican	Dennis Bova Jr.	14,729	
Conservative	Dennis Bova Jr.	1,729	
Reform	Dennis Bova Jr.	224	
Total	Dennis Bova Jr.	16,732	44.4
Write-in		20	0.1
Total votes		37,658	100.0
Democratic hold			

=== 2016 ===
2016 New York State Assembly election, District 119
Party	Candidate	Votes	%
Democratic	Anthony Brindisi	24,659	
Independence	Anthony Brindisi	4,397	
Working Families	Anthony Brindisi	3,914	
Total	Anthony Brindisi (incumbent)	32,970	99.7
Write-in		92	0.3
Total votes		33,062	100.0
Democratic hold			

=== 2014 ===
2014 New York State Assembly election, District 119
Party	Candidate	Votes	%
Democratic	Anthony Brindisi	13,733	
Independence	Anthony Brindisi	3,114	
Working Families	Anthony Brindisi	2,073	
Total	Anthony Brindisi (incumbent)	18,920	99.5
Write-in		97	0.5
Total votes		19,017	100.0
Democratic hold			

=== 2012 ===
2012 New York State Assembly election, District 119
Party	Candidate	Votes	%
Democratic	Anthony Brindisi	25,580	
Independence	Anthony Brindisi	4,403	
Working Families	Anthony Brindisi	2,968	
Total	Anthony Brindisi (incumbent)	32,951	99.6
Write-in		148	0.4
Total votes		33,099	100.0
Democratic hold			
