= John T. McDonald III =

American politician

John McDonald

Member of the New York State Assembly from the 108th district
- Incumbent
- Assumed office January 1, 2013
- Preceded by: Steven McLaughlin

Personal details
- Born: April 5, 1962 (age 64) Cohoes, New York, U.S.
- Party: Democratic
- Spouse: Renee McDonald
- Children: 3
- Education: Albany College of Pharmacy
- Website: Official website

John T. McDonald III is the Assembly member for the 108th District of the New York State Assembly. He is a Democrat. The district includes all of Cohoes and Rensselaer, and parts of Albany and Troy.

== Life and career ==
McDonald was born and raised in Cohoes, New York where he would later serve as Mayor from 1999 to 2012. In 1985, he graduated from the Albany College of Pharmacy and went on to work at Marra's Pharmacy, a family business opened by his grandfather in 1931, which is located in Cohoes, where he and his family still reside today.

Formerly, McDonald served as the President of the New York Conference of Mayors.

== New York Assembly ==
In 2012, McDonald opted to run for a newly created seat in the New York Assembly. In the Democratic primary, he defeated Albany City Council President Carolyn McLaughlin 55% to 45% to take the nomination. He would easily win the general election with 76% of the vote. In 2014 he was easily re-elected with 73% of the vote.

In the Assembly, McDonald serves as the Chairman of the Governmental Operations Committee.

Political offices
Preceded by Steven McLaughlin	New York Assembly, 106th District; 2013–present	Incumbent
