= Aileen Gunther =

American politician (born 1953/54)

Aileen M. Gunther
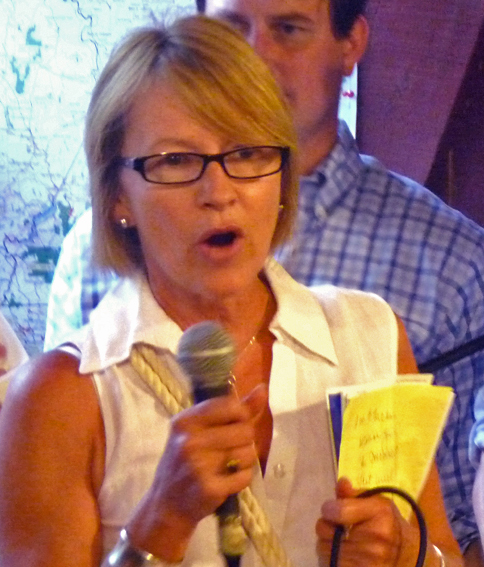

Member of the New York State Assembly from the 100th district
- In office November 5, 2003 – December 31, 2024
- Preceded by: Jacob E. Gunther III
- Succeeded by: Paula Kay

Personal details
- Born: January 21, 1954 (age 72) Orange County, New York
- Party: Democratic
- Spouse: Jacob E. Gunther III
- Children: 3
- Profession: Registered nurse, politician
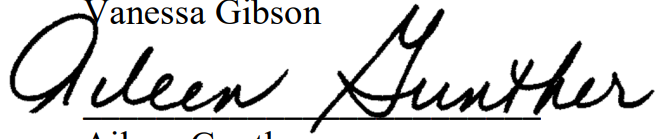
- Signature
- Website: Official website

Aileen M. Gunther (born 1953/1954) is an American politician. She was a Democratic member of the New York State Assembly representing the 100th district until 2024.

Gunther received a nursing degree from Orange County Community College. Gunther earned a national certification in infection control, a Nursing Degree from Orange County Community College and attended State University of New York, New Paltz for a degree in Liberal Arts.

She is a registered nurse with 29 years experience. Gunther is an HIV counselor. Her professional experience includes being a New York State government liaison for the Mid-Hudson Chapter of Infection Control Practitioners, a former director for performance improvement and risk management.

She was first elected in 2003 in a special election to fill the vacancy caused by the death of her husband, Jacob E. Gunther III. She ran uncontested in the 2004, 2006, 2008, and 2010 general elections. In 2024, Gunther announced that she would not run for reelection.

Gunther lives in Forestburgh, where she and her husband raised their three children: Mary Alice, Jacob IV, and Caitlin.

== Election results ==
- November 2003 special election, NYS Assembly, 98th AD

Aileen M. Gunther (DEM - WOR)	...	20,207
Alan J. Sorensen (REP - CON)	...	11,399

- November 2004 general election, NYS Assembly, 98th AD

Aileen M. Gunther (DEM - WOR)	...	31,108
(uncontested)

- November 2006 general election, NYS Assembly, 98th AD

Aileen M. Gunther (DEM - CON)	...	22,625
(uncontested)

- November 2008 general election, NYS Assembly, 98th AD

Aileen M. Gunther (DEM - IND - CON)	...	22,625
(uncontested)

- November 2010 general election, NYS Assembly, 98th AD

Aileen M. Gunther (DEM - CON)	...	25,299
(uncontested)

- November 2012 general election, NYS Assembly, 100th AD

Aileen M. Gunther (DEM - IND - WOR)	...	31,299
Gary D. Linton (REP	...	12,528

- November 2014 general election, NYS Assembly, 100th AD

Aileen M. Gunther (DEM - IND - WOR)	...	19,561
(uncontested)

- November 2016 general election, NYS Assembly, 100th AD

Aileen M. Gunther (DEM - IND - WOR)	...
(uncontested)

- November 2018 general election, NYS Assembly, 100th AD

Aileen M. Gunther (DEM - IND - WOR)	...
(uncontested)

- November 2020 general election, NYS Assembly, 100th AD

Aileen M. Gunther (DEM - IND - WOR)	...
(uncontested)

New York State Assembly
Preceded by Jacob E. Gunther III	New York State Assembly, 98th District; November 2003 – December 31, 2012	Succeeded by Ann G. Rabbitt
Preceded by Frank K. Skartados	New York State Assembly, 100th District; January 1, 2013 – December 31, 2024	Succeeded by Paula Kay
