= Steve Englebright =

American politician (born 1946)

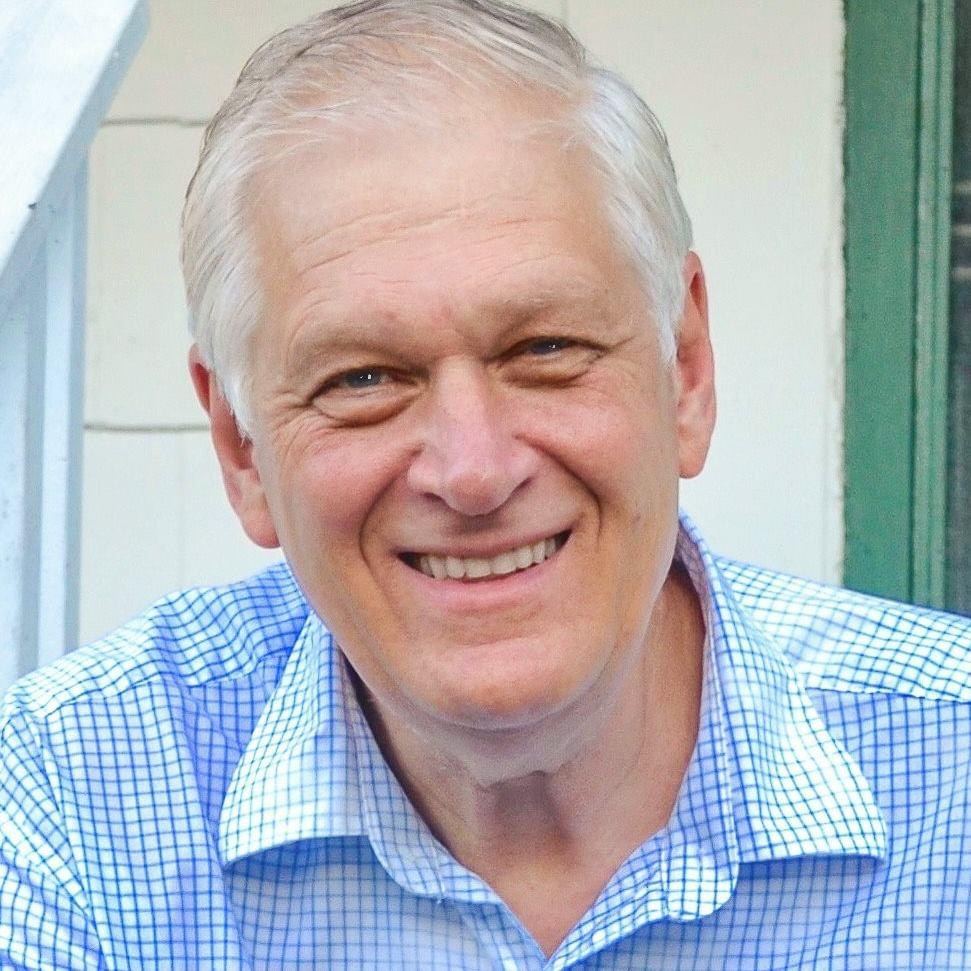

Member of the Suffolk County Legislature for the 5th district
- Incumbent
- Assumed office January 2, 2024
- Preceded by: Kara Hahn
- In office January 1, 1984 – February 26, 1992
- Preceded by: John Foley
- Succeeded by: Vivian Viloria-Fisher

Member of the New York State Assembly for the 4th district
- In office February 19, 1992 – December 31, 2022
- Preceded by: Robert J. Gaffney
- Succeeded by: Ed Flood

Personal details
- Born: August 24, 1946 (age 80) Queens, New York, U.S.
- Party: Democratic
- Education: University of Tennessee (B.A.); Stony Brook University (M.S.)
- Website: assembly.state.ny.us/mem/?ad=004

Steven C. Englebright (born August 24, 1946) is a former New York State Assembly member for the 4th District from 1992 until his defeat in 2022. He ran for Suffolk County Legislature in 2023 and won. In 2025, he ran for re-election and won. He is a Democrat and resides in Setauket, New York.

== Education ==
Englebright graduated from Bayside High School in Queens, New York. He received a B.S. degree from the University of Tennessee in 1969 and an M.S. in Paleontology/Sedimentology from Stony Brook University in 1974.

== Non-political career ==
He worked as Curator of Geologic Collections at Stony Brook University and was the founding director of the Museum of Long Island Natural Sciences. Englebright served as a Suffolk County legislator from 1983 until his election to the New York State Assembly in 1992.

Steve has been working as a professor in the Department of Geology at Stony Brook University for the past three decades.

== Political career ==
Englebright was first elected to the New York State Assembly in 1992. He was the chair of the Assembly Committee on Environmental Conservation. He was defeated in the 2022 election by Edward Flood.

In 2023, Englebright was re-elected to the Suffolk County Legislature in the 5th Legislative District, a seat he previously occupied prior to his tenure in the Assembly.

In May 2025, Steve officially announced his re-election campaign to the Suffolk County Legislature. Steve Englebright was re-elected to the Legislature in 2025 with a 62.6% vote win.

New York State Assembly
Preceded by Robert J. Gaffney	New York Assembly; 4th District; 1992–2022	Succeeded by Edward Flood
