= Pamela Hunter =

American politician

Pam Hunter

Speaker pro tempore of the New York State Assembly
- Incumbent
- Assumed office January 9, 2025
- Preceded by: Jeffrion L. Aubry

Member of the New York State Assembly from the 128th district
- Incumbent
- Assumed office November 4, 2015
- Preceded by: Samuel D. Roberts

Personal details
- Born: November 4, 1969 (age 56) New York City, New York, U.S.
- Party: Democratic
- Education: Strayer University (BS)
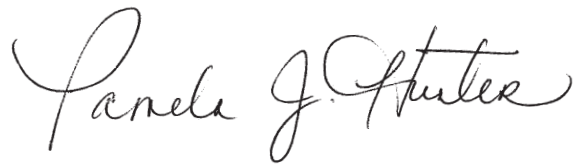
- Signature
- Website: State Assembly website

Pamela J. Hunter is an American politician who has served as speaker pro tempore of the New York State Assembly since 2025. She has represented the 128th district as a Democrat since 2015. The district includes portions of Syracuse, as well as the surrounding towns of Salina, DeWitt, and Onondaga.

== Life and career ==
Hunter was born and raised in upstate New York, and formerly served in the United States Army. Over the years, she has been significantly involved in a number of Syracuse-based charities, including the Syracuse Community Health Center, Home Aides of CNY, Catholic Charities.

In 2013, Hunter made her first foray into politics, running for and winning an at-large seat on the Syracuse Common Council. She would serve as the chair of the Public Safety Committee.

== New York Assembly ==
In 2015, Assemblyman Sam Roberts resigned to take a position with New York Governor Andrew Cuomo, and as a result a special election was called for his seat. Hunter soon after announced that she would pursue the seat, and in a three-way primary won the seat. She went on to win the three-way general election with a plurality.

Hunter was sworn into the seat on November 4, 2015.

New York State Assembly
Preceded by Jeffrion L. Aubry	Speaker pro tempore of the New York Assembly; 2025–present	Incumbent
