= Karen McMahon =

American Democratic politician

Member of the New York State Assembly from the 146th district
- Incumbent
- Assumed office January 2, 2019
- Preceded by: Raymond Walter

Personal details
- Born: March 18, 1960 (age 66) Buffalo, New York, U.S.
- Party: Democratic
- Education: SUNY Buffalo
- Occupation: Lawyer
- Website: Official website

Karen McMahon is an American lawyer and politician who serves in the New York State Assembly from the 146th district, which represents the village of Williamsville, and the towns of Amherst and Pendleton.

== Early career ==
McMahon served as a law clerk for state and federal judiciaries for many years.

== State Assembly ==
McMahon won the November 6, 2018, election for the 146th district of the New York State Assembly, defeating four-term incumbent Republican Ray Walter.

Political offices
Preceded by Raymond Walter	New York State Assembly, 146th District; January 2, 2019–	Incumbent
