= Steven Otis =

American politician

Member of the New York State Assembly from the 91st district
- Incumbent
- Assumed office January 1, 2013
- Preceded by: George Latimer

Mayor of Rye, New York
- In office 1998–2009
- Preceded by: Edward B. "Ted" Dunn
- Succeeded by: Douglas French

Personal details
- Born: December 27, 1956 (age 69)
- Party: Democratic
- Spouse: Martha Otis
- Education: Hobart and William Smith Colleges (BA); New York University (MPA); Hofstra University (JD)
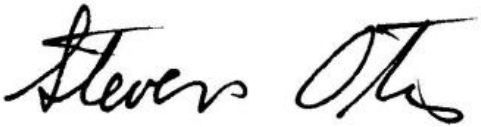
- Signature
- Website: Assembly website

Steven Otis (born December 27, 1956) is an American politician from the state of New York. He is a member of the New York State Assembly, representing the 91st district. Otis was elected to the Assembly in November 2012, taking office on January 1, 2013. He is a member of the Democratic Party.

Otis served as chief of staff to State Senator Suzi Oppenheimer, and mayor of Rye, New York, from 1998 through 2009, when he was defeated for reelection by Douglas French. When Assemblyman George S. Latimer chose to run for the State Senate seat vacated by Oppenheimer in the 2012 elections rather than seek reelection, Otis chose to run for Latimer's seat. Otis has served in the New York State Legislature since 2013.

== Legislation ==
In 2017, Otis wrote an Assembly bill allowing a sale of public land to Rye Country Day School; the mayors of Rye City and Port Chester appealed to Governor Andrew Cuomo to object to the sale. In 2019, Otis revised the bill, prompting the new mayor of Rye City to appeal to Governor Cuomo, objecting to the terms of the revision.

In 2020, he faced a primary challenge from Rye City Democratic Committee Chairperson Meg Cameron. After all ballots were counted, Otis prevailed with 5,804 votes to Cameron's 5,720 votes.

Political offices
Preceded by George Latimer	Member of the New York State Assembly from the 91st district 2013–present	Incumbent
