= Christopher S. Friend =

American politician

Member of the New York State Assembly from the 124th district
- Incumbent
- Assumed office January 1, 2011
- Preceded by: Tom O'Mara

Personal details
- Born: December 21, 1972 (age 53) Big Flats, New York, U.S.
- Party: Republican
- Spouse: Renée
- Children: Four
- Education: University of New Hampshire; SUNY at Buffalo
- Profession: chemist, politician
- Website: Official website

Christopher S. "Chris" Friend (born December 21, 1972) is an American chemist and politician who represents the 124th Assembly District of the New York State Assembly. He is a Republican and represents parts of Broome and Chemung Counties, and all of Tioga County. Friend is known to submit less bills than other Members of the Assembly. As of March 2020, Friend has sponsored 47 bills. This compares to neighboring assemblyman Phil Palmesano sponsoring 137 bills in the same time.

A native of Big Flats and a 1991 graduate of Horseheads High School, he completed a B.S. in chemistry at the University of New Hampshire before earning Master's and Ph.D. degrees in chemistry at the State University of New York at Buffalo. He was named a National Science Foundation IGERT Fellow and has published more than 20 scientific papers and symposia.

In 2006, he was elected to the Chemung County Legislature. In 2010, he won election to the State Assembly after winning Republican and Conservative party primaries against Chemung Town Supervisor George Richter, the endorsed candidate, who later endorsed Friend. The seat had become vacant after former Assemblyman Tom O'Mara ran successfully for the New York State Senate.

On June 3, 2020 Friend, along with David DiPietro, were the only two assemblymen to voted against the Digital Fair Repair Act.

Friend resides in Big Flats with his wife Renée and their four children: Brianna, Joshua, Ashley, and Elijah.

Political offices
Preceded by	Chemung County Legislator, 2nd district January 1, 2007 – December 31, 2010	Succeeded by David L. Manchester
New York State Assembly
Preceded by Thomas F. O'Mara	New York State Assembly, 137th District; January 1, 2011 – present	Succeeded by David F. Gantt
Preceded by William A. Barclay	New York State Assembly, 124th District; January 1, 2011 – present	Incumbent
