= Donna Lupardo =

American politician

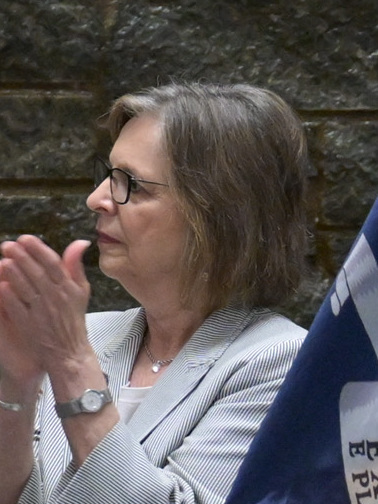
- Lupadro in 2025

Member of the New York State Assembly from the 123rd district
- Incumbent
- Assumed office January 1, 2005
- Preceded by: Robert Warner
- Succeeded by: Dan Norton (elect)

Personal details
- Born: August 17, 1954 (age 72) New York City, New York, U.S.
- Party: Democratic
- Spouse: Scott Peters
- Education: Wagner College (BA); Binghamton University (MA)
- Website: Official website

Donna A. Lupardo (born August 17, 1954) is a member of the New York State Assembly representing the 123rd Assembly District, which includes the city of Binghamton, New York, as well as the towns of Vestal, New York and Union, New York. The villages of Johnson City, New York and Endicott, New York are contained within the Town of Union and also make up part of the district.

== Biography ==
Lupardo was born in Staten Island, New York. She earned a B.A. degree from Wagner College in 1976, and an M.A. degree in philosophy from the Binghamton University in 1984. Prior to her election to the Assembly she served in several capacities, including as a member of the Broome County Legislature from 1999 to 2000. She has also worked as a community mental health educator and was a faculty member at Binghamton University from 1980 to 1990.

She was first elected to the State Assembly in November 2004, defeating the incumbent Robert J. Warner in the 126th Assembly District. In November 2006, Lupardo was re-elected, defeating challenger Jay J. Dinga by a margin of almost 2 to 1. She ran uncontested in the November 2008 general election and won the November 2010 general election with 56 percent of the vote.

After reapportionment, the boundaries to Lupardo's Assembly District remained unchanged, but the district number was changed from 126 to 123. She was elected to her fifth term in 2012, easily defeating Broome County Legislator Julie Lewis, 62% to 38%.

Lupardo ran unopposed in 2018, as well as in 2014. In 2016, she defeated challenger Dorollo Nixon with nearly 59% percent of the vote.

In 2019, Assemblywoman Lupardo was appointed as Chair of the Assembly Agriculture Committee. She previously served as Chair of the Committee on Aging, Chair of the Committee on Children and Families and Chair of the Legislative Commission on Science and Technology. She currently serves on the following committees: Higher Education, Economic Development, Rules, and Transportation. Her other leadership positions include Chair of the Legislative Women's Caucus, Co-Chair of the New York Legislative Aviation Caucus, and Past-President of the New York Conference of Italian-American State Legislators.

Assemblywoman Lupardo's legislative accomplishments include authoring the State Green Building Construction Act and Contract Disclosure Act. She also helped pass the Work Zone Safety Act and Yield-Right-Away legislation designed to keep our roadways safer.

Assemblywoman Lupardo has been a leader in the efforts to legalize and commercialize hemp in New York. In 2014, she authored legislation that was signed into law to allow research universities to partake in a pilot research program to grow industrial hemp. In 2016, the State Legislature passed her second industrial hemp bill, which was signed into law, permitting the transportation, processing, sale, and distribution of hemp grown under the research pilot program. Until the passage of the Agricultural Act of 2014, which allowed states to grow the crop in pilot research programs, the federal government banned hemp production.

Lupardo lives in Endwell, New York with her husband, Scott J. Peters.

New York State Assembly
Preceded by Robert J. Warner	Member of the New York Assembly from the 123rd district 2005–present	Incumbent
