= Samuel D. Roberts =

American politician

Sam Roberts

Member of the New York State Assembly from the 128th district
- In office January 1, 2011 – June 17, 2015
- Preceded by: Joan Christensen
- Succeeded by: Pamela Hunter

Personal details
- Born: April 3, 1956 (age 70) Syracuse, New York, U.S.
- Party: Democratic
- Spouse: Leonna
- Children: 2
- Education: Onondaga Community College (AS); Empire State College (BS)
- Website: Official website

Samuel D. "Sam" Roberts (born April 3, 1956) is an American politician who served as a member of the New York State Assembly for the 128th district, which includes a portion of Syracuse and the towns of DeWitt, Onondaga and Salina. A member of the Democratic Party, he sought the party's nomination for New York's 22nd Congressional District in the 2022 House of Representatives elections, but finished third in the primary.

== Early life and education ==
Roberts earned an associate's degree from Onondaga Community College and Bachelor of Science from Empire State College. He also holds certificates in labor studies from Cornell University.

== Career ==
Roberts is retired from General Motors where he worked for 30 years and was a member of the United Auto Workers. He was elected as recording secretary of UAW Local 465 and Chair of Local 854's Education and Civil Rights Committees.

During his employment with General Motors, Roberts also served five terms (1990–2000) as an Onondaga County legislator, representing the county's 19th district.

== Personal life ==
Roberts is also a practitioner of martial arts, holding a sixth degree black belt in American Shotokan Karate. According to his autobiography, he was a top ranked competitor prior to retirement from competition.

New York State Assembly
Preceded by Joan Christensen	Member of the New York Assembly from the 128th district 2011–2015	Succeeded by Pamela Hunter
