= Raymond Walter =

American politician

Raymond W. Walter

Justice of the New York State Supreme Court from the 8th Judicial district
- Incumbent
- Assumed office January 1, 2022

Member of the New York State Assembly from the 146th district 148th district (2011-2012)
- In office January 1, 2011 – January 1, 2019
- Preceded by: James P. Hayes
- Succeeded by: Karen McMahon

Member of the Erie County Legislature from the 4th district
- In office January 2009 – November 2011
- Preceded by: Mike Ranzenhofer
- Succeeded by: Kevin Hardwick

Personal details
- Born: February 4, 1972 (age 54)
- Party: Republican
- Education: State University of New York at Geneseo
- Occupation: Attorney, salesman

Raymond W. Walter (born February 4, 1972) is an American politician. A Republican, he served as a member of the New York State Assembly representing Assembly District 146, which comprises the Towns of Amherst in Erie County and Pendleton in Niagara County.

== Early life and career ==
Walter earned a degree in history from the State University of New York at Geneseo in 1994. Walter worked at automobile dealerships in Western New York for ten years before entering the University at Buffalo Law School. Walter clerked for the United States Attorney’s Office and the Erie County District Attorney’s Office after graduating. He joined Magavern Magavern Grimm LLP in 2007 where he practices law in estates, trusts, and elder law.

== Political career ==
His political career began in 2009 when the Erie County Republican Committee appointed him to fill the Erie County Legislature seat left empty by Michael H. Ranzenhofer who had been elected state senator.

In 2011, Walter successfully ran for a seat in the New York State Assembly. He ran unsuccessfully as the Republican candidate for Erie County Executive in 2015.

In 2018, Walter unsuccessfully ran for reelection in the New York State Assembly, losing to lawyer Karen McMahon, after she garnered 54 percent of the votes.
