= Marianne Buttenschon =

American politician

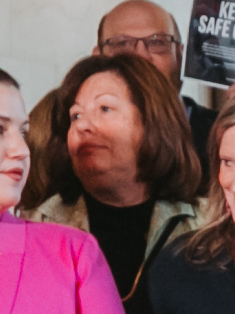

Member of the New York State Assembly from the 119th district
- Incumbent
- Assumed office January 1, 2019
- Preceded by: Anthony Brindisi
- Succeeded by: Michael Gentile (elect)

Personal details
- Born: Oneida County, New York, U.S.
- Party: Democratic
- Education: Mohawk Valley Community College (AAS); SUNY Polytechnic Institute (B.A.); Binghamton University (M.A.); Northeastern University (Ed.D)
- Website: Official website

Marianne Buttenschon is an American politician and educator from the state of New York. She is a member of the New York State Assembly, representing the 119th district.

== Early life and education ==
Buttenschon was born and raised in Oneida County, and grew up in Whitesboro, New York. Her father, Bill Goodman, was town supervisor of Whitestown, New York and a member of the Oneida County legislature.

Buttenschon earned her Associate degree from Mohawk Valley Community College, followed by a B.A. in Public Justice from SUNY Polytechnic Institute. Buttenschon then earned a master's degree in Public Policy from Binghamton University and a Doctor of Education from Northeastern University.

== Career ==
Before entering politics, Buttenschon was the dean for emergency preparedness and public service at Mohawk Valley Community College, and was previously dean of students.

Buttenschon was vice president of the Utica Community Food Bank and a member of the League of Women Voters. For 30 years, Buttenschon and her husband have operated the Buttenschon Christmas Tree Farm in Marcy, New York.

She announced her intention to run in the 2018 election for New York State Assembly to succeed Anthony Brindisi, who was elected to Congress. She defeated Republican Dennis Bova in the general election with 56% of the vote. She defeated Republican opponents John Zielenski with 57% of the vote in 2020, and Christine Esposito with 50.8% of the vote in 2024.

Buttenschon announced that she would not seek reelection in 2026.

New York State Assembly
Preceded by Anthony Brindisi	Member of the New York Assembly from the 119th district 2019–present	Incumbent
