= Amy Paulin =

American politician

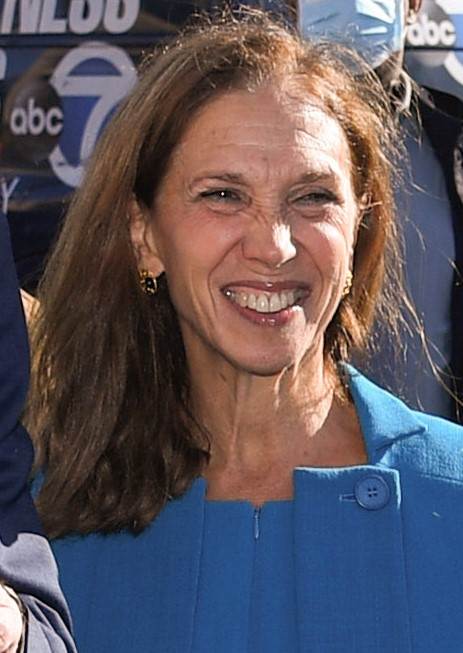

Member of the New York State Assembly from the 88th district
- Incumbent
- Assumed office January 1, 2001
- Preceded by: Audrey Hochberg

Chair of the New York Assembly Corporations, Authorities and Commissions Committee
- Incumbent
- Assumed office October 2, 2017

Chair of the New York Assembly Energy Committee
- In office January 24, 2013 – October 1, 2017
- Preceded by: Kevin Cahill
- Succeeded by: Michael Cusick

Personal details
- Born: November 29, 1955 (age 70) Brooklyn, New York, U.S.
- Party: Democratic
- Spouse: Ira Schuman
- Children: Three
- Education: University of Albany (M.A.)
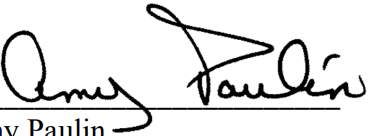
- Signature
- Website: Official website

Amy R. Paulin (born November 29, 1955) was elected to the New York State Assembly in November 2000. She represents the 88th Assembly District. Paulin chairs the Assembly Committee on Corporations, Authorities and Commissions, and serves on the Committees on Rules, Education, and Health. She previously chaired the Assembly Committee on Energy and before that chaired the Committee on Libraries and Education Technology and the Task Force on People with Disabilities.

In 2021, Governor Andrew Cuomo signed Assemblywoman Paulin's bill into law. The law repeals the ban on paid gestational surrogacy. She first introduced the bill in 2012.

Paulin is an advocate for the New York Health Act which would establish single-payer healthcare in New York State.

Paulin resides in Scarsdale with her husband, Ira Schuman. They have three children; Beth, Sarah, and Joseph. She is Jewish.

New York State Assembly
| Preceded by Audrey Hochberg | New York State Assembly, 88th District; 2001–present | Incumbent |
