= Stephen Hawley =

American politician

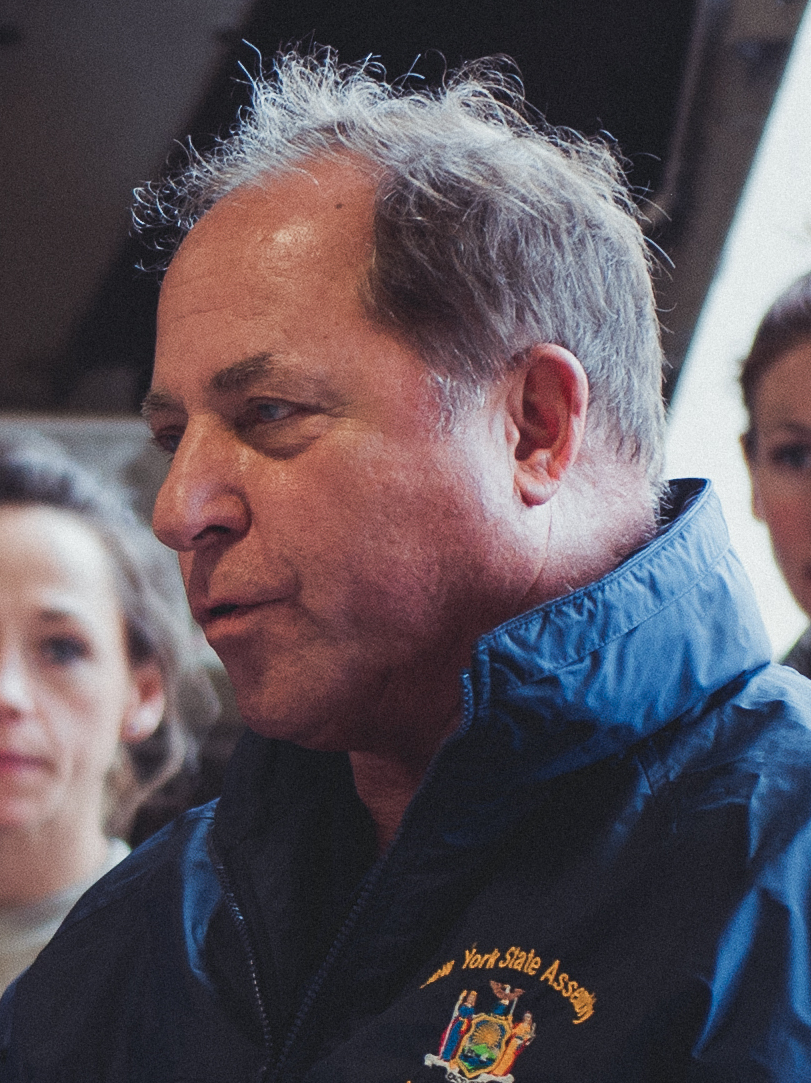
- Hawley in 2017

Member of the New York State Assembly from the 139th district
- Incumbent
- Assumed office March 1, 2006
- Preceded by: Charles H. Nesbitt

Personal details
- Born: Batavia, New York, U.S.
- Party: Republican
- Children: 2
- Education: University of Toledo
- Profession: Business owner, politician
- Website: Official website

Stephen M. Hawley is a Republican member of the New York State Assembly. He represents the 139th Assembly District, which comprises portions of Erie, Genesee, Monroe, and Orleans Counties.

== Early life, family, and education ==
Hawley is the son of former Assembly member R. Stephen Hawley and the late Ellen Hawley. A native of Batavia, New York, he graduated from Batavia High School in 1965. Hawley was a classmate of future journalist Terry A. Anderson. Hawley earned a bachelor's degree from the University of Toledo. He served for seven years in the Ohio Army National Guard and the United States Army Reserve, earning the rank of 1st Lieutenant.

== Business career ==
Hawley owns the Stephen M. Hawley Insurance Center in Batavia. Hawley previously owned and operated Hawley Farms.

== Political career ==
Hawley has served in the Genesee County Legislature.

Hawley was first elected to the State Assembly in a special election on February 28, 2006. He ran uncontested in the November 2008 general election and won the November 2010 general election with 79 percent of the vote. He was re-elected in 2024.

== Personal life ==
Hawley resides in the town of Batavia and has two sons: Brooks and Cooper.

== Election results ==
- February 2006 special election, NYS Assembly, 139th AD

Stephen M. Hawley (REP - IND - CON)	...	6,250	Gary F. Kent (DEM)	...	3,428

- November 2006 general election, NYS Assembly, 139th AD

Stephen M. Hawley (REP - IND - CON)	...	23,503	Gary F. Kent (DEM - WOR)	...	12,096

- November 2008 general election, NYS Assembly, 139th AD

Stephen M. Hawley (REP - IND - CON)	...	34,932

- November 2010 general election, NYS Assembly, 139th AD

Stephen M. Hawley (REP - IND - CON)	...	27,384	Christopher M. Barons (DEM)	...	7,426

- November 2012 general election, NYS Assembly, 139th AD

Stephen M. Hawley (REP - IND - CON)	...	39,886	Mark E. Glogowski (LIB)	...	2,919

- November 2014 general election, NYS Assembly, 139th AD

Stephen M. Hawley (REP - IND - CON)	...	29,170	Mark E. Glogowski (LIB)	...	1,363

New York State Assembly
Preceded by Charles H. Nesbitt	New York State Assembly, 139th District; 2006–present	Incumbent
