= Angelo Santabarbara =

American politician

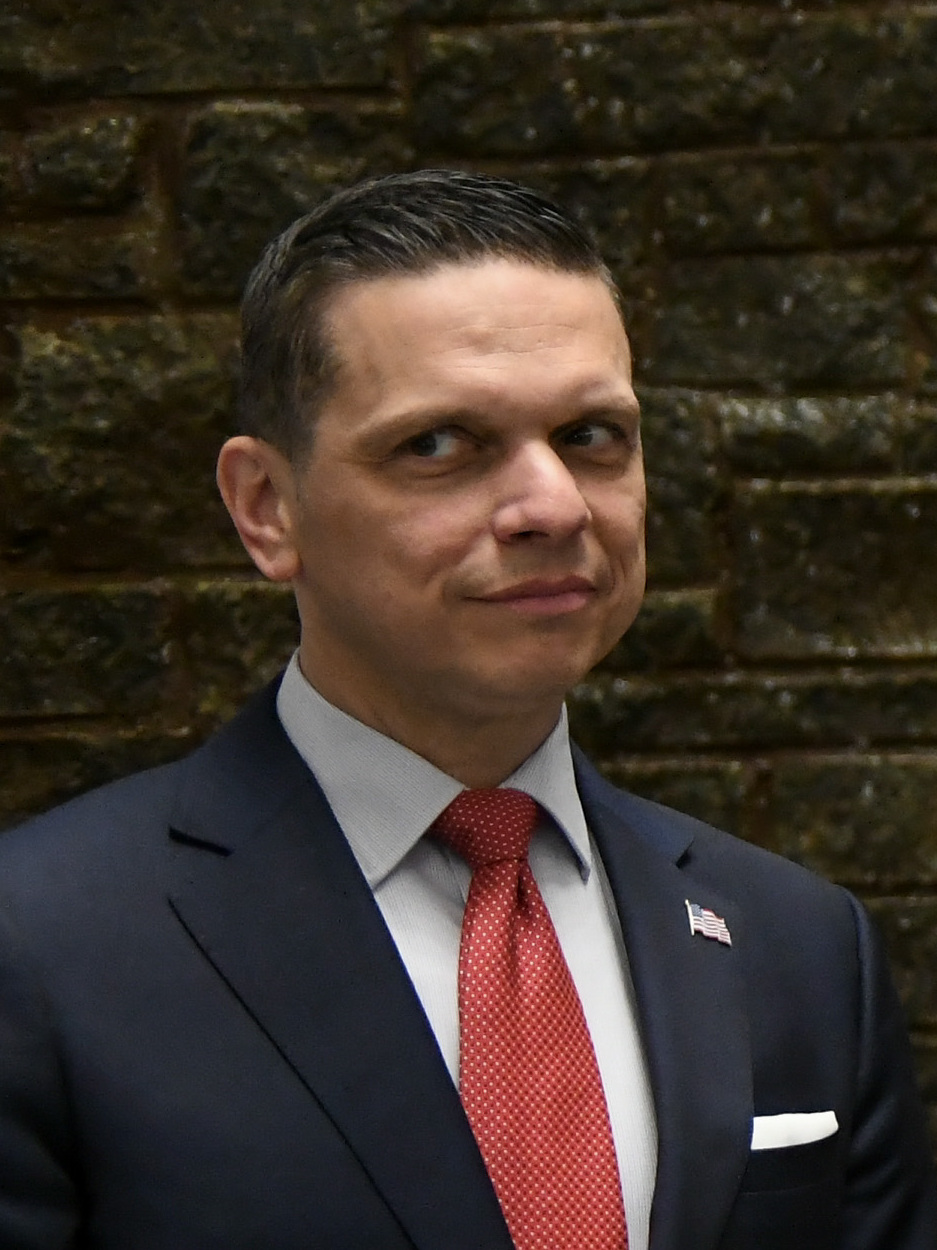

Member of the New York State Assembly from the 111th district
- Incumbent
- Assumed office January 1, 2013
- Preceded by: George A. Amedore Jr.

Personal details
- Born: September 14, 1972 (age 54) Schenectady, New York, U.S.
- Party: Democratic
- Other political affiliations: Independence Party of New York
- Spouse: Jennifer Santabarbara
- Children: 2
- Education: University at Albany (BS)
- Occupation: Army Reservist; Civil Engineer
- Committees: Commission on Rural Resources (Chair); Subcommittee on Autism Spectrum Disorder (Chair); Agriculture; Energy; Governmental Employees; Veterans' Affairs; Mental Health; Racing & Wagering
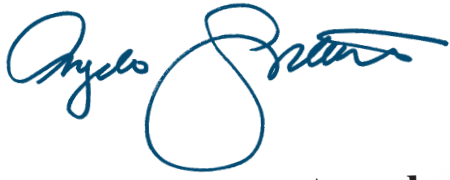
- Signature
- Website: Official website

Military service
- Allegiance: United States of America
- Branch/service: United States Army Reserve
- Years of service: 1990–1998

Angelo L. Santabarbara (born September 14, 1972) is a Democratic member of the New York State Assembly representing the 111th New York State Assembly District, which comprises areas of Montgomery and Schenectady Counties.

== Early life and career ==
Santabarbara is a first-generation Italian-American who is a lifelong resident of Schenectady County. He graduated from Schalmont High School in Rotterdam in 1990 and was later inducted into the Schalmont High School Alumni Wall of Distinction. He earned a Bachelor of Science degree from State University of New York at Albany and is a licensed Professional Engineer.

Santabarbara served in the United States Army Reserves for eight years with an honorable discharge in 1998, and has remained involved with local veterans organizations. He is the founder of the first AMVETS Post in his hometown of Rotterdam and served as Post Commander from 2012-2015. He worked as a Civil Engineer for more than 15 years before entering politics.

He also served as President of the Capital District Chapter of the New York State Society of Professional Engineers and on the Board of Directors for the Autism Society of the Greater Capital Region, Family and Child Service of Schenectady, and Cornell Cooperative Extension in Schenectady County.

== Political career ==
Santabarbara was elected to the Schenectady County Legislature in 2007 and re-elected in 2011, where he represented District 4, which includes the Towns of Rotterdam, Princetown and Duanesburg. He served as Chairman of the Transportation Committee and Vice Chairman of the Veterans Committee.

Santabarbara unsuccessfully challenged two term incumbent George Amedore for the 105th District of the New York State Assembly in 2010. He held public office as a Schenectady County Legislator for 5 years.

Angelo Santabarbara defeated Thomas Quackenbush in 2012 and was elected to the New York State Assembly as the first Assemblyman to represent the newly created 111th District, including Montgomery, Schenectady and Albany Counties. In 2022 he was reelected to a 6th term and continues to serve in the New York State Assembly.

As a member of the New York State Assembly he serves as Chairman of the Sub-Committee on Autism Retention and as a member of the Agriculture, Energy, Governmental Employees, Mental Health, Racing & Wagering, Small Business and Veterans' Affairs Committees.

On March 25, 2025, Santabarbara authored and sponsored “New York State Communication Bill of Rights for People with Disabilities” (A7363) which would "allow people with disabilities to use their preferred manner of communication and mandate that 'no state agency, school, community residence, or service provider shall restrict or deny access to a validated communication method.'" According to an interview with ABC News 10, he said that protecting communication is a civil right. The bill was supported by the Autism Society of America and Elizabeth Bonker and her organization Communication 4 ALL. Santabarbara says that his son uses an iPad and sign language to communicate and as a father he feels strongly about advocating for the non-speaking community. According to psychologist Stuart Vyse A7363 used the words "'facilitated and supported communication methods'” which raised red flags with the New York State Office for People With Developmental Disabilities (OPWDD). State Senator Pat Fahy who is the chair of the Senate Disabilities Committee, sponsored the senate version 7792-C which emphasized evidence-based communication that is "empirically supported and has demonstrated results in autonomous communication on the part of the person communicating".

Political offices
Preceded by At large	Schenectady County, New York Legislator, 4th District; January 1, 2008 – December 31, 2012	Succeeded by At large
New York State Assembly
Preceded by George A. Amedore Jr.	New York State Assembly, 111th District; January 1, 2013 – present	Incumbent
