= 2008 New York State legislative elections =

The 2008 New York state legislature primary election took place on September 9, 2008, and the general election was held on November 4, 2008. All 150 members of the New York State Assembly and all 62 seats of the New York State Senate were up for election. Members of the Assembly and the State Senate serve two-year terms.

The State Senate was heavily contested, as the Republicans held a 32–30 majority going into the election. The election saw the Democrats take control of the State Senate for the first time since 1966 with a 32–30 majority. They gained one seat in the State Assembly. Therefore, Democrats held a trifecta in the state for the first time since 1935.

== New York State Assembly ==
2008 New York State Assembly election
- November 4, 2008

150 seats from the New York State Assembly 75 seats needed for a majority
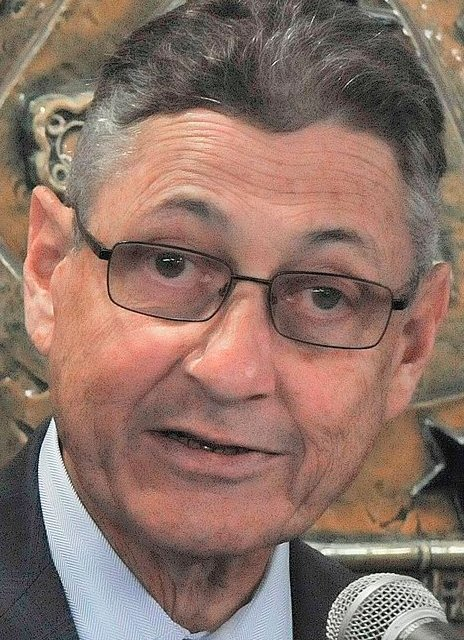

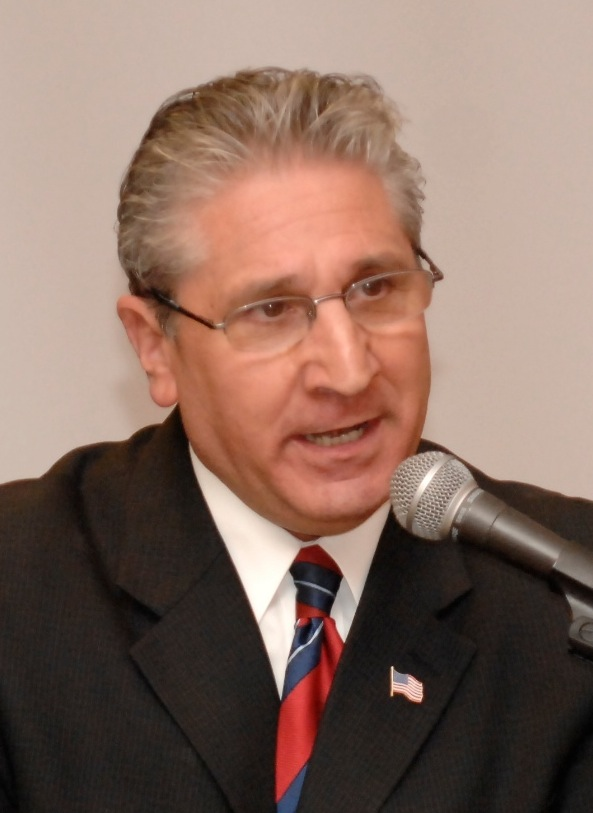

	Majority party	Minority party	Third party
Leader	Sheldon Silver	Jim Tedisco	Timothy P. Gordon (Note: Gordon caucuses with the Democrats.)
Party	Democratic	Republican	Independence
Leader since	February 11, 1994	November 29, 2005	January 2007
Leader's seat	64th district	110th district	108th district
Seats before	107	42	1
Seats after	108	41	1
Seat change	▲1	▼1	Steady
- Results: Democratic gain Democratic hold Republican hold Independence hold
Speaker before election
Sheldon Silver
Democratic
Speaker
Sheldon Silver
Democratic

=== Predictions ===
Source	Ranking	As of
Stateline	Safe D	October 15, 2008

=== Results ===
District	Party	Incumbent	Status	Party	Candidate	Votes	%
1	Democratic	Marc Alessi		Democratic	Marc Alessi	36,680	60.35%
1	Democratic	Marc Alessi		Republican	James Staudenraus	24,095	39.65%
2	Republican	Fred Thiele		Republican	Fred Thiele	32,376	62.1%
2	Republican	Fred Thiele		Democratic	William Pitcher	19,793	37.9%
3	Democratic	Patricia Eddington		Democratic	Patricia Eddington	30,334	64.75%
3	Democratic	Patricia Eddington		Republican	Scott Salimando	16,512	35.25%
4	Democratic	Steven Englebright		Democratic	Steven Englebright	34,760	66.1%
4	Democratic	Steven Englebright		Republican	Bruce Bennett	17,831	33.9%
5	Democratic	Ginny Fields		Democratic	Ginny Fields	30,191	63.5%
5	Democratic	Ginny Fields		Republican	John Bugler	17,334	36.5%
6	Democratic	Philip Ramos		Democratic	Philip Ramos	23,386	92.2%
6	Democratic	Philip Ramos		Conservative	Waldo Cabrera	1,968	7.8%
7	Republican	Michael J. Fitzpatrick		Republican	Michael J. Fitzpatrick	36,851	66.6%
7	Republican	Michael J. Fitzpatrick		Democratic	Allen Huggins	18,520	33.4%
8	Republican	Philip Boyle		Republican	Philip Boyle	29,449	60.5%
8	Republican	Philip Boyle		Democratic	Elizabeth Bloom	19,198	39.5%
9	Republican	Andrew Raia		Republican	Andrew Raia	33,905	61.5%
9	Republican	Andrew Raia		Democratic	Karen Kerr-Ozimek	20,225	36.7%
9	Republican	Andrew Raia		Working Families	Michele Mastrangelo	1,002	1.8%
10	Republican	James Conte		Republican	James Conte	30,987	57.9%
10	Republican	James Conte		Democratic	Jeffrey Stark	22,531	42.1%
11	Democratic	Robert Sweeney		Democratic	Robert Sweeney	28,358	71.3%
11	Democratic	Robert Sweeney		Republican	James McDonaugh	11,415	28.7%
12	Republican	Joseph Saladino		Republican	Joseph Saladino	38,800	67.9%
12	Republican	Joseph Saladino		Democratic	Keith Scalia	18,307	32.1%
13	Democratic	Charles Lavine		Democratic	Charles Lavine	35,960	65.3%
13	Democratic	Charles Lavine		Republican	George Mcmenamin	19,118	34.7%
14	Republican	Robert Barra		Republican	Robert Barra	31,167	57.35%
14	Republican	Robert Barra		Democratic	Joseph Ferrara	23,178	42.65%
15	Republican	Rob Walker		Republican	Rob Walker	30,528	60.1%
15	Republican	Rob Walker		Democratic	Stephanie Ovadia	20,272	39.9%
16	Democratic	Michelle Schimel		Democratic	Michelle Schimel	34,555	63.4%
16	Democratic	Michelle Schimel		Republican	Matthew Mitchell	19,961	36.6%
17	Republican	Thomas McKevitt		Republican	Thomas McKevitt	31,803	57.7%
17	Republican	Thomas McKevitt		Democratic	John Pinto	23,321	42.3%
18	Democratic	Earlene Hill Hooper		Democratic	Earlene Hill Hooper	31,629	85.1%
18	Democratic	Earlene Hill Hooper		Republican	Darren Bryant	4,538	12.2%
18	Democratic	Earlene Hill Hooper		Working Families	Henry Conyers	990	2.7%
19	Republican	David McDonough		Republican	David McDonough	33,260	62.0%
19	Republican	David McDonough		Democratic	Howard Kudler	20,363	38.0%
20	Democratic	Harvey Weisenberg		Democratic	Harvey Weisenberg	34,803	66.6%
20	Democratic	Harvey Weisenberg		Republican	Michael McGinty	17,435	33.4%
21	Republican	Thomas Alfano		Republican	Thomas Alfano	31,440	62.3%
21	Republican	Thomas Alfano		Democratic	Alan Smilowitz	19,010	37.7%
22	Democratic	Ellen Young	Defeated in primary	Democratic	Grace Meng	13,549	87.7%
22	Democratic	Ellen Young	Defeated in primary	Independence	Ellen Young	1,472	9.5%
22	Democratic	Ellen Young	Defeated in primary	Working Families	Ellen Young	426	2.8%
23	Democratic	Audrey Pheffer		Democratic	Audrey Pheffer	21,040	67.4%
23	Democratic	Audrey Pheffer		Republican	Gerald Sullivan	10,183	32.6%
24	Democratic	Mark Weprin		Democratic	Mark Weprin	27,166	100%
25	Democratic	Rory I. Lancman		Democratic	Rory I. Lancman	16,177	100%
26	Democratic	Ann-Margaret Carrozza		Democratic	Ann-Margaret Carrozza	23,587	67%
26	Democratic	Ann-Margaret Carrozza		Republican	Robert Speranza	11,639	33%
27	Democratic	Nettie Mayersohn		Democratic	Nettie Mayersohn	19,495	100%
28	Democratic	Andrew Hevesi		Democratic	Andrew Hevesi	22,667	72.9%
28	Democratic	Andrew Hevesi		Republican	Walter Schmidt	8,413	27.1%
29	Democratic	William Scarborough		Democratic	William Scarborough	29,497	100%
30	Democratic	Margaret Markey		Democratic	Margaret Markey	17,057	67.4%
30	Democratic	Margaret Markey		Republican	Anthony Nunziato	8,247	32.6%
31	Democratic	Michele Titus		Democratic	Michele Titus	24,164	100%
32	Democratic	Vivian E. Cook		Democratic	Vivian E. Cook	28,115	100%
33	Democratic	Barbara Clark		Democratic	Barbara Clark	31,698	100%
34	Democratic	Ivan Lafayette	Retiring	Democratic	Michael DenDekker	14,152	100%
35	Democratic	Jeffrion Aubry		Democratic	Jeffrion Aubry	15,183	100%
36	Democratic	Michael N. Gianaris		Democratic	Michael N. Gianaris	22,695	100%
37	Democratic	Catherine Nolan		Democratic	Catherine Nolan	19,132	100%
38	Democratic	Anthony Seminerio		Democratic	Anthony Seminerio	18,700	100%
39	Democratic	Jose Peralta		Democratic	Jose Peralta	11,988	100%
40	Nonpartisan	Vacant		Democratic	Inez Barron	29,039	96.6%
40	Nonpartisan	Vacant		Republican	Kenneth Waluyn	1,018	3.4%
41	Democratic	Helene Weinstein		Democratic	Helene Weinstein	25,547	83.8%
41	Democratic	Helene Weinstein		Republican	Alan Bellone	4,940	16.2%
42	Democratic	Rhoda Jacobs		Democratic	Rhoda Jacobs	25,108	93.9%
42	Democratic	Rhoda Jacobs		Republican	Alan Kesler	1,643	6.1%
43	Democratic	Karim Camara		Democratic	Karim Camara	26,769	92.7%
43	Democratic	Karim Camara		Republican	Stuart Balberg	2,096	7.3%
44	Democratic	James F. Brennan		Democratic	James F. Brennan	26,490	84.3%
44	Democratic	James F. Brennan		Republican	Yvette Bennett	4,919	15.7%
45	Democratic	Steven Cymbrowitz		Democratic	Steven Cymbrowitz	21,873	100%
46	Democratic	Alec Brook-Krasny		Democratic	Alec Brook-Krasny	19,293	70.05%
46	Democratic	Alec Brook-Krasny		Republican	Robert Capano	8,250	29.95%
47	Democratic	William Colton		Democratic	William Colton	14,949	72.7%
47	Democratic	William Colton		Republican	Russell Gallo	5,627	27.3%
48	Democratic	Dov Hikind		Democratic	Dov Hikind	18,918	94.3%
48	Democratic	Dov Hikind		Conservative	Herbert Ryan	1,139	5.7%
49	Democratic	Peter Abbate		Democratic	Peter Abbate	14,034	71.9%
49	Democratic	Peter Abbate		Republican	Lucretia Regina-Potter	5,487	28.1%
50	Democratic	Joseph Lentol		Democratic	Joseph Lentol	24,538	89.95%
50	Democratic	Joseph Lentol		Republican	Teresa Puccio	2,742	10.05%
51	Democratic	Félix Ortiz		Democratic	Félix Ortiz	16,302	86.9%
51	Democratic	Félix Ortiz		Republican	Luis Garcia	2,161	11.5%
51	Democratic	Félix Ortiz		Conservative	Grace Coen	290	1.6%
52	Democratic	Joan Millman		Democratic	Joan Millman	47,704	91.8%
52	Democratic	Joan Millman		Republican	Pedro Monge	4,272	8.2%
53	Democratic	Vito Lopez		Democratic	Vito Lopez	25,733	94.4%
53	Democratic	Vito Lopez		Republican	Frances Cutrone	1,531	5.6%
54	Democratic	Darryl Towns		Democratic	Darryl Towns	20,532	95.7%
54	Democratic	Darryl Towns		Republican	Khorshed Chowdhury	923	4.3%
55	Democratic	William Boyland Jr.		Democratic	William Boyland Jr.	27,326	98.15%
55	Democratic	William Boyland Jr.		Republican	Jonathan Anderson	516	1.85%
56	Democratic	Annette Robinson		Democratic	Annette Robinson	30,911	98.5%
56	Democratic	Annette Robinson		Republican	Henry Snead	477	1.5%
57	Democratic	Hakeem Jeffries		Democratic	Hakeem Jeffries	39,992	98.0%
57	Democratic	Hakeem Jeffries		Republican	Charles Brickous	801	2.0%
58	Democratic	N. Nick Perry		Democratic	N. Nick Perry	30,069	100%
59	Democratic	Alan Maisel		Democratic	Alan Maisel	24,569	94.9%
59	Democratic	Alan Maisel		Conservative	Edward Bracken	1,316	5.1%
60	Democratic	Janele Hyer-Spencer		Democratic	Janele Hyer-Spencer	20,077	54.7%
60	Democratic	Janele Hyer-Spencer		Republican	Joseph Cammarata	16,620	45.3%
61	Democratic	Matthew Titone		Democratic	Matthew Titone	25,974	73.1%
61	Democratic	Matthew Titone		Republican	Thomas Mcginley	8,578	24.1%
61	Democratic	Matthew Titone		Independence	Rose Margarella	985	2.8%
62	Republican	Lou Tobacco		Republican	Lou Tobacco	30,410	72.0%
62	Republican	Lou Tobacco		Democratic	Albert Albanese	11,816	28.0%
63	Democratic	Michael Cusick		Democratic	Michael Cusick	23,568	65.3%
63	Democratic	Michael Cusick		Republican	David Pascarella	12,539	34.7%
64	Democratic	Sheldon Silver		Democratic	Sheldon Silver	27,632	78.9%
64	Democratic	Sheldon Silver		Republican	Danniel Maio	7,387	21.1%
65	Democratic	Micah Kellner		Democratic	Micah Kellner	36,672	75.9%
65	Democratic	Micah Kellner		Republican	Georgiana Viest	11,629	24.1%
66	Democratic	Deborah Glick		Democratic	Deborah Glick	49,914	100%
67	Democratic	Linda Rosenthal		Democratic	Linda Rosenthal	44,522	83.5%
67	Democratic	Linda Rosenthal		Republican	Eleanor Friedman	8,820	16.5%
68	Democratic	Adam Clayton Powell IV		Democratic	Adam Clayton Powell IV	30,161	91.65%
68	Democratic	Adam Clayton Powell IV		Republican	Norma Soriano	2,122	6.45%
68	Democratic	Adam Clayton Powell IV		Independence	George Espada	627	1.9%
69	Democratic	Daniel O'Donnell		Democratic	Daniel O'Donnell	43,123	100%
70	Democratic	Keith L. T. Wright		Democratic	Keith L. T. Wright	37,130	97.2%
70	Democratic	Keith L. T. Wright		Republican	Rueben Riley	1,076	2.8%
71	Democratic	Herman D. Farrell		Democratic	Herman D. Farrell	33,824	92.7%
71	Democratic	Herman D. Farrell		Republican	Kenneth Britton	2,646	7.3%
72	Democratic	Adriano Espaillat		Democratic	Adriano Espaillat	26,712	94.15%
72	Democratic	Adriano Espaillat		Republican	William Buran	1,661	6.85%
73	Democratic	Jonathan Bing		Democratic	Jonathan Bing	37,628	73.8%
73	Democratic	Jonathan Bing		Republican	David Casavis	13,377	26.2%
74	Democratic	Brian Kavanagh		Democratic	Brian Kavanagh	38,763	85.3%
74	Democratic	Brian Kavanagh		Republican	Bryan Cooper	6,679	14.7%
75	Democratic	Richard Gottfried		Democratic	Richard Gottfried	43,452	82.3%
75	Democratic	Richard Gottfried		Republican	Saul Farber	9,371	17.7%
76	Democratic	Peter Rivera		Democratic	Peter Rivera	26,832	92.5%
76	Democratic	Peter Rivera		Republican	Charles Serrano	2,167	7.5%
77	Democratic	Aurelia Greene		Democratic	Aurelia Greene	23,857	96.6%
77	Democratic	Aurelia Greene		Republican	Anthony Curry	849	3.4%
78	Democratic	Jose Rivera		Democratic	Jose Rivera	18,452	90.6%
78	Democratic	Jose Rivera		Republican	Jose Torres	1,701	8.3%
78	Democratic	Jose Rivera		Conservative	Robert Lupo	222	1.1%
79	Democratic	Michael Benjamin		Democratic	Michael Benjamin	26,083	98.6%
79	Democratic	Michael Benjamin		Conservative	Sigfredo Gonzalez	364	1.4%
80	Democratic	Naomi Rivera		Democratic	Naomi Rivera	20,075	78.8%
80	Democratic	Naomi Rivera		Republican	Louise Delucia	4,917	18.7%
80	Democratic	Naomi Rivera		Conservative	Patrick McManus	665	2.5%
81	Democratic	Jeffrey Dinowitz		Democratic	Jeffrey Dinowitz	28,702	95.8%
81	Democratic	Jeffrey Dinowitz		Conservative	Jeffrey Klapper	1,271	4.2%
82	Democratic	Michael Benedetto		Democratic	Michael Benedetto	29,619	82.9%
82	Democratic	Michael Benedetto		Republican	Raymond Capone	6,092	17.1%
83	Democratic	Carl Heastie		Democratic	Carl Heastie	30,584	97.1%
83	Democratic	Carl Heastie		Republican	Michael Blot	909	2.9%
84	Democratic	Carmen E. Arroyo		Democratic	Carmen E. Arroyo	22,575	98.8%
84	Democratic	Carmen E. Arroyo		Conservative	Frank Dellavalle	271	1.2%
85	Democratic	Rubén Díaz Jr.		Democratic	Rubén Díaz Jr.	23,423	95.7%
85	Democratic	Rubén Díaz Jr.		Republican	Nelson Moran	867	3.5%
85	Democratic	Rubén Díaz Jr.		Conservative	Sandra Eligon	192	0.8%
86	Nonpartisan	Vacant		Democratic	Nelson Castro	18,248	95.25%
86	Nonpartisan	Vacant		Republican	Lisa Marie Campbell	910	4.75%
87	Democratic	J. Gary Pretlow		Democratic	J. Gary Pretlow	30,417	93.5%
87	Democratic	J. Gary Pretlow		Conservative	Ralph Pearson	1,212	3.7%
87	Democratic	J. Gary Pretlow		Working Families	Ernest Boaten	901	2.8%
88	Democratic	Amy Paulin		Democratic	Amy Paulin	35,153	69.2%
88	Democratic	Amy Paulin		Republican	Anthony Pilla	15,655	30.8%
89	Democratic	Adam Bradley		Democratic	Adam Bradley	40,238	100%
90	Democratic	Sandra Galef		Democratic	Sandra Galef	35,852	67.3%
90	Democratic	Sandra Galef		Republican	William Gouldman	16,520	30.5%
90	Democratic	Sandra Galef		Working Families	Richard Quaglietta	1,197	2.2%
91	Democratic	George Latimer		Democratic	George Latimer	31,886	71.3%
91	Democratic	George Latimer		Republican	Rob Biagi	12,816	28.7%
92	Democratic	Richard Brodsky		Democratic	Richard Brodsky	41,624	100%
93	Democratic	Mike Spano		Democratic	Mike Spano	33,650	73.6%
93	Democratic	Mike Spano		Republican	James Faulkner	12,043	26.3%
94	Democratic	Kenneth Zebrowski Jr.		Democratic	Kenneth Zebrowski Jr.	43,227	100%
95	Democratic	Ellen C. Jaffee		Democratic	Ellen C. Jaffee	32,850	100%
96	Republican	Nancy Calhoun		Republican	Nancy Calhoun	29,477	53.45%
96	Republican	Nancy Calhoun		Democratic	Richard Randazzo	25,674	46.55%
97	Republican	Ann Rabbitt		Republican	Ann Rabbitt	32,400	61.7%
97	Republican	Ann Rabbitt		Democratic	Jerome Sommer	20,118	38.3%
98	Democratic	Aileen Gunther		Democratic	Aileen Gunther	35,630	100%
99	Republican	Greg Ball		Republican	Greg Ball	33,323	57.8%
99	Republican	Greg Ball		Democratic	John Degnan	24,374	42.2%
100	Republican	Thomas Kirwan	Democratic win from Republican	Democratic	Frank Skartados	22,501	51.0%
100	Republican	Thomas Kirwan	Democratic win from Republican	Republican	Thomas Kirwan	21,605	49.0%
101	Democratic	Kevin Cahill		Democratic	Kevin Cahill	38,339	68.0%
101	Democratic	Kevin Cahill		Republican	Robin Yess	18,053	32.0%
102	Republican	Joel Miller		Republican	Joel Miller	28,849	53.25%
102	Republican	Joel Miller		Democratic	Jonathan Smith	25,331	46.75%
103	Republican	Marcus Molinaro		Republican	Marcus Molinaro	33,329	61.3%
103	Republican	Marcus Molinaro		Democratic	Anne Rubin	21,008	38.7%
104	Democratic	John McEneny		Democratic	John McEneny	43,367	78.95%
104	Democratic	John McEneny		Republican	Terrence O'Neill	11,563	21.05%
105	Republican	George Amedore		Republican	George Amedore	29,784	61.8%
105	Republican	George Amedore		Democratic	Mark Blanchfield	18,404	38.2%
106	Democratic	Ronald Canestrari		Democratic	Ronald Canestrari	37,952	100%
107	Republican	Clifford Crouch		Republican	Clifford Crouch	32,441	100%
108	Independence	Timothy P. Gordon		Independence	Timothy P. Gordon	37,205	60.4%
108	Independence	Timothy P. Gordon		Republican	Steven McLaughlin	24,429	39.6%
109	Democratic	Robert Reilly		Democratic	Robert Reilly	41,822	64.0%
109	Democratic	Robert Reilly		Republican	John Wasielewski	23,566	36.0%
110	Republican	James Tedisco		Republican	James Tedisco	41,889	100%
111	Democratic	William Magee		Democratic	William Magee	29,304	100%
112	Republican	Roy McDonald	Running for State Senate	Republican	Tony Jordan	31,264	56.6%
112	Republican	Roy McDonald	Running for State Senate	Democratic	Ian McGaughey	23,990	43.4%
113	Republican	Teresa Sayward		Republican	Teresa Sayward	38,675	100%
114	Republican	Janet Duprey		Republican	Janet Duprey	31,541	100%
115	Republican	David Townsend		Republican	David Townsend	33,383	87.6%
115	Republican	David Townsend		Conservative	Daniel LeClair	4,710	12.4%
116	Democratic	RoAnn Destito		Democratic	RoAnn Destito	27,226	67.95%
116	Democratic	RoAnn Destito		Republican	Kevin McDonald	12,843	32.05%
117	Republican	Marc Butler		Republican	Marc Butler	30,813	70.9%
117	Republican	Marc Butler		Democratic	Daniel Carter	12,667	29.1%
118	Nonpartisan	Vacant		Democratic	Addie Jenne Russell	24,843	58.4%
118	Nonpartisan	Vacant		Republican	Robert W. Cantwell III	17,243	40.5%
119	Democratic	Joan Christensen		Democratic	Joan Christensen	35,371	69.3%
119	Democratic	Joan Christensen		Republican	Christina Fitch	15,639	30.7%
120	Democratic	William Magnarelli		Democratic	William Magnarelli	33,668	76.1%
120	Democratic	William Magnarelli		Republican	Kristen Rounds	10,549	23.9%
121	Democratic	Albert A. Stirpe Jr.		Democratic	Albert A. Stirpe Jr.	37,083	59.4%
121	Democratic	Albert A. Stirpe Jr.		Republican	David Knapp	25,348	40.6%
122	Republican	Dierdre Scozzafava		Republican	Dierdre Scozzafava	29,383	100%
123	Republican	Gary Finch		Republican	Gary Finch	29,456	64.9%
123	Republican	Gary Finch		Democratic	Barbara King	15,940	35.1%
124	Republican	William Barclay		Republican	William Barclay	34,594	66.8%
124	Republican	William Barclay		Democratic	Jerome Burns	17,198	33.2%
125	Democratic	Barbara Lifton		Democratic	Barbara Lifton	34,768	100%
126	Democratic	Donna Lupardo		Democratic	Donna Lupardo	33,877	100%
127	Republican	Peter Lopez		Republican	Peter Lopez	34,042	100%
128	Republican	Robert Oaks		Republican	Robert Oaks	32,498	100%
129	Republican	Brian Kolb		Republican	Brian Kolb	32,363	65.9%
129	Republican	Brian Kolb		Democratic	Noah Sargent	16,762	34.1%
130	Republican	Joseph Errigo		Republican	Joseph Errigo	37,767	100%
131	Democratic	Susan John		Democratic	Susan John	28,591	67.3%
131	Democratic	Susan John		Republican	Jeffrey Morrow	12,643	29.7%
131	Democratic	Susan John		Independence	Rafael Colon	1,257	3.0%
132	Democratic	Joseph Morelle		Democratic	Joseph Morelle	41,690	100%
133	Democratic	David Gantt		Democratic	David Gantt	29,601	100%
134	Republican	Bill Reilich		Republican	Bill Reilich	33,490	63.95%
134	Republican	Bill Reilich		Democratic	David Garretson	18,881	36.05%
135	Democratic	David Koon		Democratic	David Koon	40,467	59.8%
135	Democratic	David Koon		Republican	David Bonacchi	27,169	40.2%
136	Republican	James Bacalles		Republican	James Bacalles	31,333	100%
137	Republican	Tom O'Mara		Republican	Tom O'Mara	28,111	100%
138	Democratic	Francine DelMonte		Democratic	Francine DelMonte	28,887	62.5%
138	Democratic	Francine DelMonte		Republican	Paula Banks Dahlke	17,343	37.5%
139	Republican	Stephen Hawley		Republican	Stephen Hawley	34,925	100%
140	Democratic	Robin Schimminger		Democratic	Robin Schimminger	36,354	90.6%
140	Democratic	Robin Schimminger		Working Families	Janice Tennant	3,755	10.4%
141	Democratic	Crystal Peoples		Democratic	Crystal Peoples	37,615	100%
142	Republican	Mike Cole	Defeated in primary	Republican	Jane Corwin	32,293	88.8%
142	Republican	Mike Cole	Defeated in primary	Working Families	Jeffrey Bono	4,084	11.2%
143	Democratic	Dennis H. Gabryszak		Democratic	Dennis H. Gabryszak	35,834	69.3%
143	Democratic	Dennis H. Gabryszak		Republican	John Kaczorowski	15,857	30.7%
144	Democratic	Sam Hoyt		Democratic	Sam Hoyt	30,228	70.9%
144	Democratic	Sam Hoyt		Republican	Sheila Ferrentino	12,418	21.1%
145	Democratic	Mark J. F. Schroeder		Democratic	Mark J. F. Schroeder	37,563	75.0%
145	Democratic	Mark J. F. Schroeder		Republican	Dennis Marek	12,551	25.0%
146	Republican	Jack Quinn III		Republican	Jack Quinn III	40,848	72.95%
146	Republican	Jack Quinn III		Democratic	Leonard Kowalski	15,148	27.05%
147	Republican	Daniel Burling		Republican	Daniel Burling	30,952	70.1%
147	Republican	Daniel Burling		Democratic	Philip Jones	12,238	27.7%
147	Republican	Daniel Burling		Working Families	Wayne Bieger	949	2.2%
148	Republican	James Hayes		Republican	James Hayes	33,787	60.3%
148	Republican	James Hayes		Democratic	Jerome Schad	20,680	36.9%
148	Republican	James Hayes		Working Families	Paul Brown	1,580	2.8%
149	Republican	Joseph Giglio		Republican	Joseph Giglio	26,343	64.8%
149	Republican	Joseph Giglio		Democratic	Patrick Eaton	14,284	35.2%
150	Democratic	William Parment		Democratic	William Parment	30,086	100%

== New York State Senate ==
2008 New York State Senate election
- November 4, 2008

All 62 seats in the New York State Senate 32 seats needed for a majority
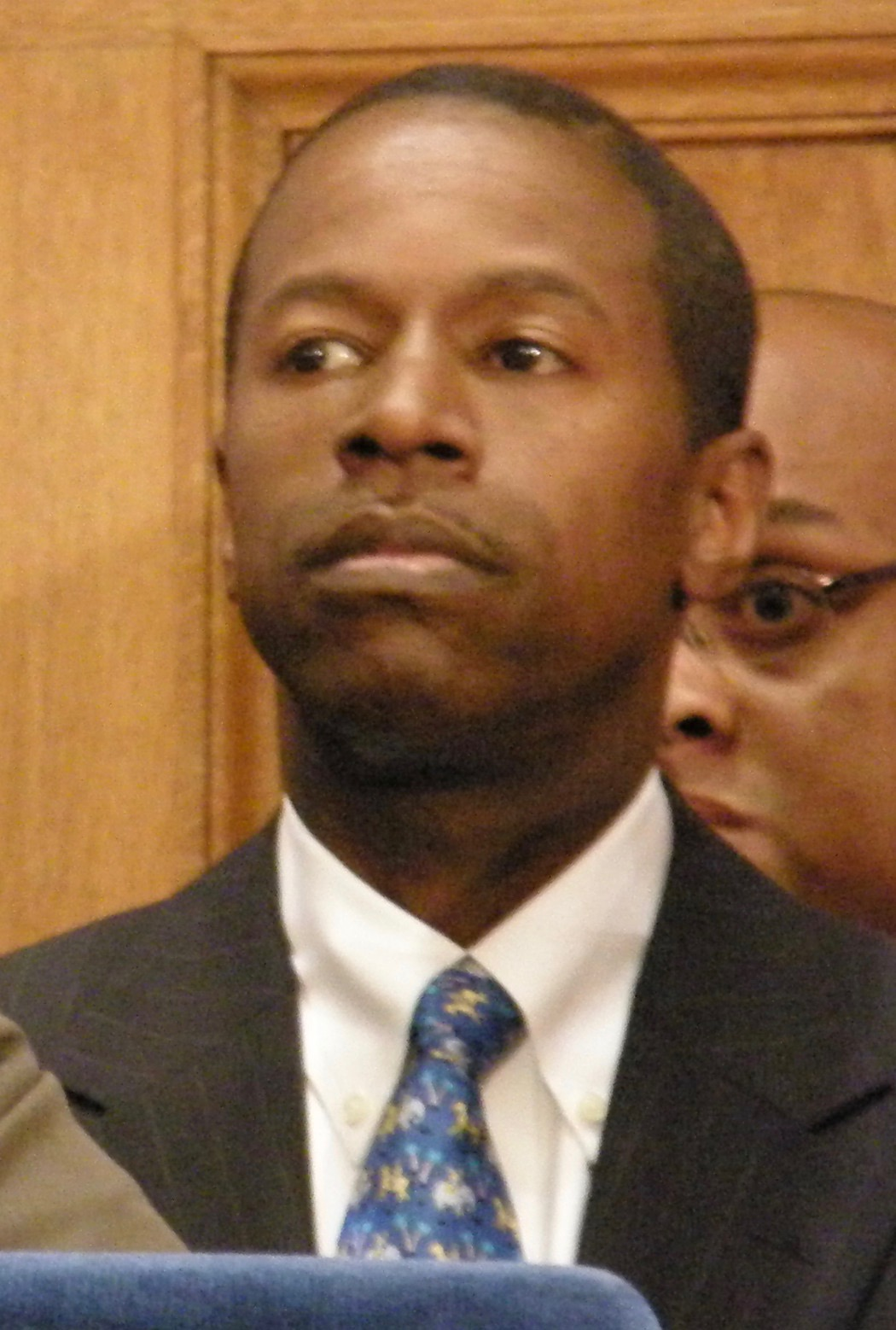

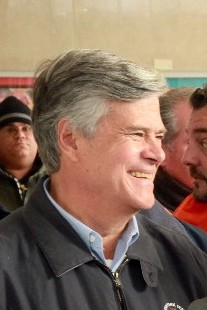
	Majority party	Minority party
Leader	Malcolm Smith	Dean Skelos
Party	Democratic	Republican
Leader's seat	14th district	9th district
Seats before	30	32
Seats after	32	30
Seat change	▲2	▼2
- Results: Democratic gain Democratic hold Republican hold
Temporary President and Majority Leader before election
Dean Skelos
Republican
Temporary President and Majority Leader
Malcolm Smith
Democratic

=== Predictions ===
Source	Ranking	As of
Stateline	Lean D (flip)	October 15, 2008

=== Results ===
District	Party	Incumbent	Status	Party	Candidate	Votes	%
1	Republican	Kenneth P. LaValle		Republican	Kenneth P. LaValle	81,062	100%
2	Republican	John J. Flanagan		Republican	John J. Flanagan	82,777	65.7%
2	Republican	John J. Flanagan		Democratic	Michael De Paoli	43,220	34.3%
3	Republican	Caesar Trunzo	Democratic win from Republican	Democratic	Brian X. Foley	67,480	59.1%
3	Republican	Caesar Trunzo	Democratic win from Republican	Republican	Caesar Trunzo	46,758	40.9%
4	Republican	Owen H. Johnson		Republican	Owen H. Johnson	60,007	59.0%
4	Republican	Owen H. Johnson		Democratic	Tanya Gillard	39,456	38.8%
4	Republican	Owen H. Johnson		Working Families	John Albano	2,219	2.2%
5	Republican	Carl Marcellino		Republican	Carl Marcellino	79,645	60.9%
5	Republican	Carl Marcellino		Democratic	Matthew Meng	51,130	39.1%
6	Republican	Kemp Hannon		Republican	Kemp Hannon	60,590	51.3%
6	Republican	Kemp Hannon		Democratic	Kristen McElroy	57,560	48.7%
7	Democratic	Craig Johnson		Democratic	Craig Johnson	68,161	56.7%
7	Democratic	Craig Johnson		Republican	Barbara Donno	52,108	43.3%
8	Republican	Charles Fuschillo		Republican	Charles Fuschillo	74,374	60.5%
8	Republican	Charles Fuschillo		Democratic	Carol Gordon	48,492	39.5%
9	Republican	Dean G. Skelos		Republican	Dean G. Skelos	82,410	64.7%
9	Republican	Dean G. Skelos		Democratic	Roy Simon	45,038	35.3%
10	Democratic	Shirley Huntley		Democratic	Shirley Huntley	67,361	100%
11	Republican	Frank Padavan		Republican	Frank Padavan	45,294	50.3%
11	Republican	Frank Padavan		Democratic	James Gennaro	44,811	49.7%
12	Democratic	George Onorato		Democratic	George Onorato	49,318	81.1%
12	Democratic	George Onorato		Republican	Thomas Dooley	11,472	18.9%
13	Democratic	John Sabini	Retiring	Democratic	Hiram Monserrate	39,543	100%
14	Democratic	Malcolm Smith		Democratic	Malcolm Smith	67,828	100%
15	Republican	Serphin R. Maltese	Democratic win from Republican	Democratic	Joseph Addabbo Jr.	39,978	57.5%
15	Republican	Serphin R. Maltese	Democratic win from Republican	Republican	Serphin R. Maltese	29,544	42.5%
16	Democratic	Toby Ann Stavisky		Democratic	Toby Ann Stavisky	48,078	69.3%
16	Democratic	Toby Ann Stavisky		Republican	Peter Koo	21,336	30.7%
17	Democratic	Martin Malave Dilan		Democratic	Martin Malave Dilan	57,762	92.5%
17	Democratic	Martin Malave Dilan		Republican	Victor Guarino	4,667	7.5%
18	Democratic	Velmanette Montgomery		Democratic	Velmanette Montgomery	88,137	96.2%
18	Democratic	Velmanette Montgomery		Republican	Sandra Palacios-Serrano	3,482	3.8%
19	Democratic	John L. Sampson		Democratic	John L. Sampson	69,811	95.1%
19	Democratic	John L. Sampson		Republican	Godfrey Jelks	3,577	4.9%
20	Democratic	Eric Adams		Democratic	Eric Adams	79,000	93.1%
20	Democratic	Eric Adams		Republican	Stephen Christopher	5,887	6.9%
21	Democratic	Kevin Parker		Democratic	Kevin Parker	61,579	90.3%
21	Democratic	Kevin Parker		Republican	Glenn Nocera	6,594	9.7%
22	Republican	Martin Golden		Republican	Martin Golden	42,084	100%
23	Democratic	Diane Savino		Democratic	Diane Savino	46,386	78.6%
23	Democratic	Diane Savino		Republican	Richard Thomas	12,621	21.4%
24	Republican	Andrew Lanza		Republican	Andrew Lanza	75,371	70.2%
24	Republican	Andrew Lanza		Democratic	Joseph Pancila	32,013	29.8%
25	Democratic	Martin Connor	Defeated in primary	Democratic	Dan Squadron	81,402	87.1%
25	Democratic	Martin Connor	Defeated in primary	Republican	John Chromczak	12,023	12.9%
26	Democratic	Liz Krueger		Democratic	Liz Krueger	92,044	75.0%
26	Democratic	Liz Krueger		Republican	Timothy Brown	30,648	25.0%
27	Democratic	Carl Kruger		Democratic	Carl Kruger	42,066	93.3%
27	Democratic	Carl Kruger		Conservative	Vyacheslav Patrin	3,040	6.7%
28	Democratic	José M. Serrano		Democratic	José M. Serrano	63,766	93.0%
28	Democratic	José M. Serrano		Republican	Keesha Weiner	4,807	7.0%
29	Democratic	Thomas K. Duane		Democratic	Thomas K. Duane	114,103	85.7%
29	Democratic	Thomas K. Duane		Republican	Debra Leible	19,008	14.3%
30	Democratic	Bill Perkins		Democratic	Bill Perkins	95,706	100%
31	Democratic	Eric T. Schneiderman		Democratic	Eric T. Schneiderman	80,811	90.0%
31	Democratic	Eric T. Schneiderman		Republican	Martin Chicon	8,346	9.3%
31	Democratic	Eric T. Schneiderman		Conservative	Stephen Bradian	662	0.7%
32	Democratic	Rubén Díaz		Democratic	Rubén Díaz	71,381	98.7%
32	Democratic	Rubén Díaz		Conservative	William McDonagh	918	1.3%
33	Democratic	Efrain Gonzalez	Defeated in primary	Democratic	Pedro Espada Jr.	52,090	97.4%
33	Democratic	Efrain Gonzalez	Defeated in primary	Conservative	William Sullivan	1,377	2.6%
34	Democratic	Jeffrey Klein		Democratic	Jeffrey Klein	61,862	73.2%
34	Democratic	Jeffrey Klein		Republican	Daniel Fasolino	22,622	26.8%
35	Democratic	Andrea Stewart-Cousins		Democratic	Andrea Stewart-Cousins	70,811	61.7%
35	Democratic	Andrea Stewart-Cousins		Republican	John Murtagh	43,940	38.3%
36	Democratic	Ruth Hassell-Thompson		Democratic	Ruth Hassell-Thompson	82,322	96.7%
36	Democratic	Ruth Hassell-Thompson		Republican	Curtis Brooks	2,835	3.3%
37	Democratic	Suzi Oppenheimer		Democratic	Suzi Oppenheimer	78,862	62.6%
37	Democratic	Suzi Oppenheimer		Republican	Liz Feld	47,036	37.4%
38	Republican	Thomas Morahan		Republican	Thomas Morahan	84,886	63.35%
38	Republican	Thomas Morahan		Democratic	Gregory Julian	49,118	36.65%
39	Republican	William Larkin		Republican	William Larkin	72,601	61.2%
39	Republican	William Larkin		Democratic	Lawrence Delarose	46,063	38.8%
40	Republican	Vincent Leibell		Republican	Vincent Leibell	74,537	100%
41	Republican	Stephen M. Saland		Republican	Stephen M. Saland	74,087	58.05%
41	Republican	Stephen M. Saland		Democratic	Kenneth J. Dow	53,548	41.95%
42	Republican	John Bonacic		Republican	John Bonacic	65,938	100%
43	Nonpartisan	Vacancy		Republican	Roy McDonald	82,211	59.0%
43	Nonpartisan	Vacancy		Democratic	Michael Russo	54,582	39.2%
43	Nonpartisan	Vacancy		Working Families	Christopher Consuello	2,481	1.8%
44	Republican	Hugh Farley		Republican	Hugh Farley	78,178	66.1%
44	Republican	Hugh Farley		Democratic	Fred Goodman	37,240	31.5%
44	Republican	Hugh Farley		Working Families	BK Keramati	2,798	2.4%
45	Republican	Betty Little		Republican	Betty Little	84,482	100%
46	Democratic	Neil Breslin		Democratic	Neil Breslin	101,794	89.85%
46	Democratic	Neil Breslin		Conservative	Charlie Voelker	11,497	10.15%
47	Republican	Joseph Griffo		Republican	Joseph Griffo	66,204	88.55%
47	Republican	Joseph Griffo		Working Families	Michael Boncella	8,562	11.45%
48	Democratic	Darrel Aubertine		Democratic	Darrel Aubertine	52,908	53.0%
48	Democratic	Darrel Aubertine		Republican	David Renzi	46,941	47.0%
49	Democratic	David J. Valesky		Democratic	David Valesky	72,337	64.5%
49	Democratic	David J. Valesky		Republican	James DiStefano	39,819	35.5%
50	Republican	John DeFrancisco		Republican	John DeFrancisco	87,795	69.0%
50	Republican	John DeFrancisco		Democratic	Carol Mulcahy	39,431	31.0%
51	Republican	James Seward		Republican	James Seward	73,814	63.5%
51	Republican	James Seward		Democratic	Don Barber	42,440	36.5%
52	Republican	Thomas W. Libous		Republican	Thomas W. Libous	77,078	100%
53	Republican	George H. Winner Jr.		Republican	George H. Winner Jr.	61,144	58.5%
53	Republican	George H. Winner Jr.		Democratic	John Tonello	43,341	41.5%
54	Republican	Michael Nozzolio		Republican	Michael Nozzolio	87,428	71.4%
54	Republican	Michael Nozzolio		Democratic	Paloma Capanna	34,988	28.6%
55	Republican	James Alesi		Republican	James Alesi	85,339	60.3%
55	Republican	James Alesi		Democratic	David Nachbar	56,189	39.7%
56	Republican	Joseph Robach		Republican	Joseph Robach	62,329	51.7%
56	Republican	Joseph Robach		Democratic	Richard Dollinger	58,117	48.3%
57	Republican	Catharine Young		Republican	Catharine Young	82,766	78.0%
57	Republican	Catharine Young		Democratic	Christopher Schaeffer	23,400	22.0%
58	Democratic	William Stachowski		Democratic	William Stachowski	64,116	53.0%
58	Democratic	William Stachowski		Republican	Dennis Delano	56,871	47.0%
59	Republican	Dale Volker		Republican	Dale Volker	70,635	55.2%
59	Republican	Dale Volker		Democratic	Kathy Konst	57,278	44.8%
60	Democratic	Antoine Thompson		Democratic	Antoine Thompson	76,835	100%
61	Republican	Mary Lou Rath	Retiring	Republican	Michael Ranzenhofer	74,750	52.7%
61	Republican	Mary Lou Rath	Retiring	Democratic	Joe Mesi	67,207	47.3%
62	Republican	George Maziarz		Republican	George Maziarz	78,787	68.2%
62	Republican	George Maziarz		Democratic	Brian Grear	36,689	31.8%

== See also ==
- 2009 New York State Senate leadership crisis
- New York state elections
