= New York's 112th State Assembly district =

American legislative district

Assemblymember
Mary Beth Walsh; R–Burnt Hills

New York's 112th State Assembly district is one of the 150 districts in the New York State Assembly. It has been represented by Mary Beth Walsh since 2017.

== Geography ==
=== 2020s ===
District 112 contains portions of Fulton, Saratoga and Schenectady counties. The towns of Ballston, Broadalbin, Charlton, Clifton Park, Halfmoon, Galway, Glenville, Milton and Providence are included in this district.

The district overlaps (partially) with New York's 20th and 21st congressional districts and the 44th, 46th and 49th districts of the New York State Senate.

=== 2010s ===
District 112 contains portions of Saratoga and Schenectady counties.

== Recent election results ==
=== 2026 ===
2026 New York State Assembly election, District 112
Party	Candidate	Votes	%
Republican	Mary Beth Walsh		
Conservative	Mary Beth Walsh		
Total	Mary Beth Walsh (incumbent)		
Democratic	Mario Fantini		
Working Families	Mario Fantini		
Total	Mario Fantini		
Write-in			
Total votes			

=== 2024 ===
2024 New York State Assembly election, District 112
Party	Candidate	Votes	%
Republican	Mary Beth Walsh	38,594	
Conservative	Mary Beth Walsh	5,694	
Total	Mary Beth Walsh (incumbent)	44,288	58.8
Democratic	Joseph Seeman	28,617	
Working Families	Joseph Seeman	2,339	
Total	Joseph Seeman	30,956	41.1
Write-in		30	0.1
Total votes		75,274	100.0
Republican hold			

=== 2022 ===
2022 New York State Assembly election, District 112
Party	Candidate	Votes	%
Republican	Mary Beth Walsh	30,443	
Conservative	Mary Beth Walsh	5,211	
Total	Mary Beth Walsh (incumbent)	35,654	59.6
Democratic	Andrew McAdoo	22,347	
Working Families	Andrew McAdoo	1,794	
Total	Andrew McAdoo	24,141	40.4
Write-in		9	0.0
Total votes		59,804	100.0
Republican hold			

=== 2020 ===
2020 New York State Assembly election, District 112
Party	Candidate	Votes	%
Republican	Mary Beth Walsh	39,138	
Conservative	Mary Beth Walsh	5,280	
Independence	Mary Beth Walsh	1,771	
Total	Mary Beth Walsh (incumbent)	46,189	57.8
Democratic	Joseph Seeman	30,867	
Working Families	Joseph Seeman	2,883	
Total	Joseph Seeman	33,750	42.2
Write-in		28	0.0
Total votes		79,967	100.0
Republican hold			

=== 2018 ===
2018 New York State Assembly election, District 112
Party	Candidate	Votes	%
Republican	Mary Beth Walsh	31,959	
Independence	Mary Beth Walsh	5,734	
Conservative	Mary Beth Walsh	5,158	
Reform	Mary Beth Walsh	815	
Total	Mary Beth Walsh (incumbent)	43,666	98.9
Write-in		467	1.1
Total votes		44,133	100.0
Republican hold			

=== 2016 ===
2016 New York State Assembly election, District 112
Primary election
Party	Candidate	Votes	%
Republican	Mary Beth Walsh	3,476	55.1
Republican	James Fischer	2,828	44.9
Write-in		0	0.0
Total votes		6,304	100
General election
Republican	Mary Beth Walsh	34,026	
Conservative	Mary Beth Walsh	4,960	
Independence	Mary Beth Walsh	1,992	
Reform	Mary Beth Walsh	289	
Total	Mary Beth Walsh	41,267	61.8
Democratic	Michael Godlewski	30,867	
Women's Equality	Michael Godlewski	982	
Total	Michael Godlewski	25,399	38.1
Write-in		53	0.1
Total votes		66,719	100.0
Republican hold			

=== 2014 ===
2014 New York State Assembly election, District 112
Party	Candidate	Votes	%
Republican	Jim Tedisco	25,587	
Conservative	Jim Tedisco	4,923	
Independence	Jim Tedisco	2,634	
Stop Common Core	Jim Tedisco	661	
Total	Jim Tedisco (incumbent)	33,805	76.4
Democratic	Jared Hickey	10,400	23.5
Write-in		27	0.1
Total votes		44,232	100.0
Republican hold			

=== 2012 ===
2012 New York State Assembly election, District 112
Party	Candidate	Votes	%
Republican	Jim Tedisco	35,311	
Conservative	Jim Tedisco	4,874	
Independence	Jim Tedisco	2,744	
Total	Jim Tedisco (incumbent)	42,929	68.0
Democratic	Michele Draves	18,624	
Working Families	Michele Draves	1,518	
Total	Michele Draves	20,142	31.9
Write-in		34	0.1
Total votes		63,105	100.0
Republican hold			
