= Sarah Rogerson =

American politician

Member-elect of the New York State Senate from the 44th district
- Assuming office January 2027
- Succeeding: Jim Tedisco

Personal details
- Party: Democratic

Sarah F. Rogerson is an American politician. A member of the Democratic Party, she is the member-elect for the 44th district of the New York State Senate.
