= New York's 32nd State Assembly district =

American legislative district

Assemblymember
Vivian Cook; D–Jamaica
- Registration: 78.5% Democratic; 3.5% Republican; 15.7% No party preference
- Demographics: 2% White; 56% Black; 19% Hispanic; 13% Asian; 0% Native American; 0% Hawaiian/Pacific Islander; 6% Other
- Population (2020): 133,941
- Registered voters: 77,215

New York's 32nd State Assembly district is one of the 150 districts in the New York State Assembly in the United States. It has been represented by Democrat Vivian Cook since 1991. In 2026, she announced that she would not run for re-election.

== Geography ==
=== 2010s ===
District 32 is located in Queens, comprising the neighborhoods of Jamaica, Rochdale, and Locust Manor, and parts of Richmond Hill, St. Albans and South Ozone Park.

The district is entirely within New York's 5th congressional district, and overlaps the 10th, 11th, 14th and 15th districts of the New York State Senate, and the 24th, 27th, 28th and 29th districts of the New York City Council.

=== 2010s ===
District 32 is located in Queens, comprising the neighborhoods of Jamaica, Rochdale, and parts of Richmond Hill and South Ozone Park.

== Recent election results ==
=== 2026 ===
2026 New York State Assembly election, District 32
Primary election
Party	Candidate	Votes	%
Democratic	Nathaniel Hezekiah III	3,783	51.9
Democratic	Latoya LeGrand	1,425	19.5
Democratic	Mohammed Molla	799	10.9
Democratic	Tunisia Morrison	733	10.1
Democratic	Queen Johnson	539	7.4
Write-in		17	0.2
Total votes		7,296	100.0
General election
Democratic	Nathaniel Hezekiah III		
The Answer Party	Paul Nichols		
Write-in			
Total votes			100.0

=== 2024 ===
2024 New York State Assembly election, District 32
Party	Candidate	Votes	%
Democratic	Vivian Cook (incumbent)	32,663	99.4
Write-in		184	0.6
Total votes		32,847	100.0
Democratic hold			

=== 2022 ===
2022 New York State Assembly election, District 32
Primary election
Party	Candidate	Votes	%
Democratic	Vivian Cook (incumbent)	4,384	56.8
Democratic	Anthony Andrews Jr.	3,307	42.9
Write-in		20	0.3
Total votes		7,711	100.0
General election
Democratic	Vivian Cook (incumbent)	18,385	85.1
Republican	Marilyn Miller	1,766	8.2
Working Families	Anthony Andrews Jr.	1,446	6.7
Write-in		16	0.0
Total votes		21,613	100.0
Democratic hold			

=== 2020 ===
2020 New York State Assembly election, District 32
Party	Candidate	Votes	%
Democratic	Vivian Cook (incumbent)	42,061	99.8
Write-in		99	0.2
Total votes		42,160	100.0
Democratic hold			

=== 2018 ===
2018 New York State Assembly election, District 32
Party	Candidate	Votes	%
Democratic	Vivian Cook (incumbent)	29,991	99.8
Write-in		52	0.2
Total votes		30,043	100.0
Democratic hold			

=== 2016 ===
2016 New York State Assembly election, District 32
Primary election
Party	Candidate	Votes	%
Democratic	Vivian Cook (incumbent)	4,021	77.6
Democratic	Rodney Reid	1,141	22.0
Write-in		17	0.3
Total votes		5,179	100.0
General election
Democratic	Vivian Cook (incumbent)	39,305	99.8
Write-in		87	0.2
Total votes		39,392	100.0
Democratic hold			

=== 2014 ===
2014 New York State Assembly election, District 32
Party	Candidate	Votes	%
Democratic	Vivian Cook (incumbent)	14,086	99.8
Write-in		33	0.2
Total votes		14,119	100.0
Democratic hold			

=== 2012 ===
2012 New York State Assembly election, District 32
Party	Candidate	Votes	%
Democratic	Vivian Cook (incumbent)	34,415	99.9
Write-in		19	0.1
Total votes		34,434	100.0
Democratic hold			

=== 2010 ===
2010 New York State Assembly election, District 32
Party	Candidate	Votes	%
Democratic	Vivian Cook (incumbent)	18,065	100.0
Write-in		9	0.0
Total votes		18,074	100.0
Democratic hold			

=== 2008 ===
2008 New York State Assembly election, District 32
Party	Candidate	Votes	%
Democratic	Vivian Cook	29,199	
Working Families	Vivian Cook	658	
Total	Vivian Cook (incumbent)	29,857	100.0
Write-in		1	0.0
Total votes		29,858	100.0
Democratic hold			

=== 2006 ===
2006 New York State Assembly election, District 32
Party	Candidate	Votes	%
Democratic	Vivian Cook (incumbent)	13,727	99.6
Write-in		58	0.4
Total votes		13,785	100.0
Democratic hold			

=== 2004 ===
2004 New York State Assembly election, District 32
Party	Candidate	Votes	%
Democratic	Vivian Cook	26,219	
Working Families	Vivian Cook	725	
Total	Vivian Cook (incumbent)	26,944	95.8
Republican	Jereline Hunter	1,049	
Conservative	Jereline Hunter	141	
Total	Jereline Hunter	1,190	4.2
Write-in		1	0.0
Total votes		28,135	100.0
Democratic hold			

=== 2002 ===
2002 New York State Assembly election, District 32
Primary election
Party	Candidate	Votes	%
Democratic	Vivian Cook (incumbent)	5,623	78.5
Democratic	Rachel Gordon	1,536	21.5
Write-in		1	0.0
Total votes		7,160	100.0
General election
Democratic	Vivian Cook	15,096	
Liberal	Vivian Cook	166	
Total	Vivian Cook (incumbent)	15,262	95.9
Independence	Rachel Gordon	645	4.1
Write-in		0	0.0
Total votes		15,907	100.0
Democratic hold			

=== 2000 ===
2000 New York State Assembly election, District 32
Party	Candidate	Votes	%
Democratic	Vivian Cook	25,169	
Liberal	Vivian Cook	507	
Total	Vivian Cook (incumbent)	25,676	100.0
Write-in		0	0.0
Total votes		25,676	100.0
Democratic hold			

=== Federal results in Assembly District 32 ===
Year	Office	Results
2024	President	Harris 81.9 - 16.7%
2024	Senate	Gillibrand 84.5 - 14.8%
2022	Senate	Schumer 91.3 - 8.3%
2020	President	Biden 91.6 - 7.7%
2018	Senate	Gillibrand 97.2 - 2.8%
2016	President	Clinton 94.5 - 4.0%
2016	Senate	Schumer 95.5 - 3.3%
2012	President	Obama 98.0 - 1.8%
2012	Senate	Gillibrand 98.0 - 1.6%
