= Mary Beth Walsh =

American politician

Member of the New York State Assembly from the 112th district
- Incumbent
- Assumed office January 1, 2017
- Preceded by: Jim Tedisco

Personal details
- Party: Republican
- Children: 6
- Website: Official website

Mary Beth Walsh is an American politician who has been a member of the New York State Assembly for the 112th district since 2017.

== Life and career ==
A practicing attorney, Walsh formerly served on the Ballston Town Council, and also served as Saratoga Assistant County Attorney and the Town of Edinburg Attorney. She has also served on various other boards and commissions throughout her career.

== New York State Assembly ==
In 2016, Walsh ran for election to represent the 112th district in the New York State Assembly, succeeding long-time incumbent Jim Tedisco, who had represented the district for 34 years and opted to retire and run for the New York Senate that year to replace Hugh Farley. She defeated Jim Fischer in the primary election, 55% to 45%, and would go on to win the general election against Democrat Michael R. Godlewski by a 62% to 38% margin. Walsh was sworn into office on January 1, 2017. Walsh's district includes portions of Saratoga, Schenectady, and Fulton counties.

In 2024, Walsh was appointed as minority leader pro tempore of the State Assembly, the second-highest ranking position in the minority conference.

Political offices
Preceded by Jim Tedisco	Member of the New York State Assembly; 2017–present	Incumbent
