= Minita =

Minita is both a feminine given name and a middle name. Notable people with the name include:

- Minita Chico-Nazario (1939–2022), Philippine judge
- Minita Sanghvi (born 1977), Indian-American politician and academic
- Elmira Minita Gordon (1930–2021), Belizean psychologist and politician

== See also ==
- La Minita, Texas, United States, a census-designated place
