= Brian Kolb =

American politician (born 1952)

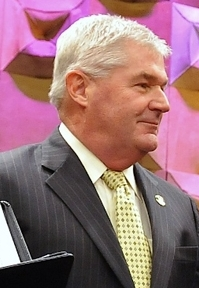

Minority Leader of the New York State Assembly
- In office April 6, 2009 – January 3, 2020
- Preceded by: Jim Tedisco
- Succeeded by: William A. Barclay

Member of the New York State Assembly from the 131st district
- In office January 1, 2013 – December 31, 2020
- Preceded by: Harry Bronson
- Succeeded by: Jeff Gallahan

Member of the New York State Assembly from the 129th district
- In office February 17, 2000 – December 31, 2012
- Preceded by: Craig Doran
- Succeeded by: Bill Magnarelli

Personal details
- Born: August 14, 1952 (age 74) Rochester, New York, U.S.
- Party: Republican
- Spouse: Lauren Kolb
- Children: 3
- Education: Roberts Wesleyan College (BS, MS)

Brian M. Kolb (born August 14, 1952) is an American politician who served as a member of the New York State Assembly for the 129th district and 131st district from 2000 to 2021. Kolb also served as minority leader from 2009 to 2020.

== Biography ==
Kolb was born in Rochester, New York. He received his Associate of Arts degree from Saint Petersburg Junior College in 1980. In 1996, he received his Bachelor of Science from Roberts Wesleyan College, and later earned his Master of Science from Roberts Wesleyan in 1998.

=== Career ===
He became an adjunct professor at Roberts Wesleyan in 2000. He was co-founder of North American Filter Corporation and is a former president and COO of the Refractron Technologies Corporation.

From 1986 to 1987, Kolb was the town supervisor of Richmond, New York, and served on the Ontario County Board of Supervisors.

=== New York State Assembly ===
Kolb was first elected to the New York State Assembly in a February 2000 special election. As of January 2020, he has been re-elected nine times. Kolb represented the 129th assembly district from 2000 to 2012, and represented the 131st assembly district from 2013 to 2021. New York's 131st Assembly District comprises all of Ontario County and portions of Seneca County in Upstate New York.

A Republican, Kolb was chosen as Assembly Minority Leader following the resignation of Jim Tedisco. He became Assembly Minority Leader on April 6, 2009. As of December 2018, Kolb was the longest-serving legislative leader in the New York State Legislature.

A member of the National Rifle Association of America, Kolb appeared alongside the organization's CEO, Wayne LaPierre, at a 2012 lobby day event in Albany. Kolb is also a member of the New York State Rifle & Pistol Association.

In 2017, Kolb was the only one of New York's five state legislative leaders and six statewide elected officials to support New York Proposition 1 (2017), which called for a state constitutional convention. Proposition 1 was defeated at the ballot box, receiving only 16% of the vote.

Kolb stepped down from the position of Assembly Minority Leader on January 3, 2020 In February 2020, Kolb announced that he would not seek re-election to the Assembly in the November 2020 election.

=== Other potential bids for political office ===
Kolb had been named as a leading Republican contender in New York's 29th congressional district in 2010; however, he declined to seek the seat after becoming minority leader. Though his potential candidacy was never taken seriously, he also declined an opportunity to run against Kirsten Gillibrand for United States Senate and also declined to run for Congress in 2012, this time against Democrat Kathy Hochul.

On December 12, 2017, Kolb announced his intent to run for Governor of New York in 2018. He withdrew from the race in February 2018.

== Personal life ==
Kolb resides in Victor, NewYork. He and his wife, Lauren, have three children and two grandchildren .

New York State Assembly
Preceded by Craig Doran	Member of the New York Assembly from the 129th district 2000–2012	Succeeded by William Magnarelli
Preceded by Harry Bronson	Member of the New York Assembly from the 131st district 2013–2021	Succeeded by Jeff Gallahan
Preceded by Jim Tedisco	Minority Leader of the New York Assembly; 2009–2020	Succeeded by William A. Barclay
