= Fred Isabella =

American dentist and politician

Member of the New York State Senate from the 44th district
- In office January 1, 1975 – December 31, 1976
- Preceded by: Mary Anne Krupsak
- Succeeded by: Hugh Farley

Personal details
- Born: August 3, 1917 Mechanicville, New York, U.S.
- Died: November 5, 2007 (aged 90) Schenectady, New York, U.S.
- Resting place: St. John the Baptist Cemetery
- Party: Democratic
- Spouse: Helen Sullivan (died 2005)
- Children: 5
- Education: Albany College of Pharmacy and Health Sciences; University at Buffalo; New York University

Fred Isabella (August 3, 1917 – November 28, 2007) was an American dentist and politician from New York. He served in the New York State Senate from 1975 to 1977.

== Early life ==
Fred Isabella was born on August 3, 1917, in Mechanicville, New York, to Rose (née Miranda) and Nicola Isabel. He graduated from Mont Pleasant High School in Schenectady. He also graduated from the Albany College of Pharmacy and Health Sciences and the University at Buffalo School of Dental Medicine. He attended New York University for postgraduate studies.

== Career ==
Isabella served as a member of the United States Army in World War II. In 1947, he started his dental practice in Schenectady and continued his practice for over 50 years. He was the dentist for the Carmelite Monastery Nuns since 1947. He owned F&H Pharmacy with his wife.

Isabella served on the Schenectady City Council from 1958 to 1974. In 1963, he won the Democratic nomination for a bid at mayor of Schenectady. He lost the election to Republican incumbent Malcolm Ellis by a margin of 120 votes. He was a Democrat and represented the 44th district in the New York State Senate from 1975 to 1977. He lost in the 1976 Democratic primary to lobbyist John Quimby. In the 1978 general election, he lost to Republican incumbent Hugh Farley.

== Personal life ==
Isabella married Helen Sullivan. She died in 2005. They had five children, Sharran A., Frederick S., James M., Joseph J., and Mary F. He was a minister, trustee, and member of the Holy Name Society at the St. John the Evangelist Church in Schenectady. He was a member of the Schenectady Kiwanis Club for over 60 years. He was also a member of the Knights of Columbus, Council 201, Sons of Italy, Third Order of Secular Discalced Carmelites, and the 3rd District Dental Society. He served on the board of directors for the Schenectady Boys & Girls Club.

Isabella lived most of his life in Schenectady. He died on November 28, 2007, aged 90, in Schenectady. He was buried in St. John the Baptist Cemetery.
