= Smardz =

Smardz is a Polish surname. Notable people with the surname include:

- Karolyn Smardz Frost, Canadian historian
- Kevin Smardz (born 1975), American politician
