= New York's 110th State Assembly district =

American legislative district

Assemblymember
Phillip Steck; D–Colonie

New York's 110th State Assembly district is one of the 150 districts in the New York State Assembly. It has been represented by Phillip Steck since 2013.

== Geography ==
=== 2020s ===
District 110 contains portions of Albany and Schenectady counties. It contains the towns of Colonie, Niskayuna, a portion of the city of Schenectady and portions of the town of Guilderland, including Fort Hunter.

The district is entirely within New York's 20th congressional district, and overlaps (partially) with the 43rd, 44th and 46th districts of the New York State Senate.

=== 2010s ===
District 110 contains portions of Albany and Schenectady counties. It contains the towns of Colonie, Niskayuna, and a portion of the city of Schenectady.

== Recent election results ==
=== 2024 ===
2024 New York State Assembly election, District 110
Party	Candidate	Votes	%
Democratic	Phillip Steck	36,424	
Working Families	Phillip Steck	3,291	
Total	Phillip Steck (incumbent)	39,715	58.2
Republican	Jeff Madden	24,868	
Conservative	Jeff Madden	3,513	
Total	Jeff Madden	28,381	41.6
Write-in		88	0.2
Total votes		68,184	100.0
Democratic hold			

=== 2022 ===
2022 New York State Assembly election, District 110
Party	Candidate	Votes	%
Democratic	Phillip Steck	28,603	
Working Families	Phillip Steck	2,742	
Total	Phillip Steck (incumbent)	31,345	57.0
Republican	Alexandra Velella	20,171	
Conservative	Alexandra Velella	3,421	
Total	Alexandra Velella	23,592	42.9
Write-in		53	0.1
Total votes		54,990	100.0
Democratic hold			

=== 2020 ===
2020 New York State Assembly election, District 110
Party	Candidate	Votes	%
Democratic	Phillip Steck	38,056	
Working Families	Phillip Steck	3,654	
Independence	Phillip Steck	1,333	
Total	Phillip Steck (incumbent)	43,043	62.6
Republican	Dave Feiden	22,765	
Conservative	Dave Feiden	2,860	
Total	Dave Feiden	25,625	37.3
Write-in		95	0.1
Total votes		68,763	100.0
Democratic hold			

=== 2018 ===
2018 New York State Assembly election, District 110
Primary election
Party	Candidate	Votes	%
Reform	Phillip Steck (incumbent)	409	97.6
Write-in		10	2.4
Total votes		419	100
General election
Democratic	Phillip Steck	28,550	
Working Families	Phillip Steck	1,299	
Independence	Phillip Steck	1,196	
Women's Equality	Phillip Steck	493	
Reform	Phillip Steck	179	
Total	Phillip Steck (incumbent)	31,717	60.3
Republican	Christopher Carey	17,852	
Conservative	Christopher Carey	2,988	
Total	Christopher Carey	20,840	39.6
Write-in		42	0.1
Total votes		52,599	100.0
Democratic hold			

=== 2016 ===
2016 New York State Assembly election, District 110
Party	Candidate	Votes	%
Democratic	Phillip Steck	32,351	
Independence	Phillip Steck	1,747	
Working Families	Phillip Steck	1,707	
Women's Equality	Phillip Steck	507	
Total	Phillip Steck (incumbent)	36,212	61.1
Republican	Tom Murphy	22,336	
Reform	Tom Murphy	624	
Total	Tom Murphy	22,960	38.8
Write-in		58	0.1
Total votes		59,230	100.0
Democratic hold			

=== 2014 ===
2014 New York State Assembly election, District 110
Party	Candidate	Votes	%
Democratic	Phillip Steck	17,663	
Working Families	Phillip Steck	1,942	
Independence	Phillip Steck	1,773	
Total	Phillip Steck (incumbent)	21,378	54.0
Republican	Thomas Jasiewicz	14,900	
Conservative	Thomas Jasiewicz	3,303	
Total	Thomas Jasiewicz	18,203	45.9
Write-in		51	0.1
Total votes		39,632	100.0
Democratic hold			

=== 2012 ===
2012 New York State Assembly election, District 110
Primary election
Party	Candidate	Votes	%
Democratic	Phillip Steck	2,252	38.6
Democratic	Kevin Frazier	1,698	29.1
Democratic	Joe Landry	1,227	21.1
Democratic	Timothy Nichols	652	11.2
Write-in		0	0.0
Total votes		5,829	100
Independence	Jennifer Whalen	281	57.4
Independence	Kevin Frazier	91	18.6
Independence	Phillip Steck	82	16.7
Independence	Joe Landry	36	7.3
Write-in		0	0.0
Total votes		490	100
Working Families	Phillip Steck	21	77.8
Working Families	Joe Landry	5	18.5
Working Families	Concetta Zhavy	1	3.7
Write-in		0	0.0
Total votes		27	100
General election
Democratic	Phillip Steck	30,455	
Working Families	Phillip Steck	2,209	
Total	Phillip Steck	32,664	57.1
Republican	Jennifer Whalen	20,277	
Conservative	Jennifer Whalen	2,626	
Independence	Jennifer Whalen	1,585	
Total	Jennifer Whalen	24,488	42.8
Write-in		60	0.1
Total votes		57,212	100.0
Democratic hold			
