= Maurice Brown (politician) =

American politician (born 1992)

- Brown in 2015

Member-elect of the New York State Assembly from the 129th district
- Assuming office January 1, 2027
- Succeeding: William Magnarelli

Personal details
- Born: May 5, 1992 (age 34)
- Party: Democratic
- Education: Onondaga Community College (AA); Syracuse University (BA)
- Website: Campaign website

Military service
- Branch/service: United States Army Reserve

Maurice "Mo" Brown (born May 5, 1992) is an American politician and member-elect of the New York State Assembly representing the 129th district. A Democrat, he is currently a member of the Onondaga County Legislature.

== Early life and career ==
Brown is a native of Brooklyn, New York. He played college football at SUNY Brockport but dropped out after one semester and enrolled at Onondaga Community College. Brown was on track to graduate in December 2016, but was activated in the United States Army Reserve and deployed to Guantanamo Bay for eight months. After returning, he completed his associate degree in communication studies in 2017 then earned a bachelor's degree from Syracuse University in 2019.

After graduating, Brown was campaign manager for Anna Kelles' successful run for the New York State Assembly's 125th district in the 2020 election. In 2021, he started working as a success coach in Onondaga Community College's School of Liberal Arts. Brown is a member of Democratic Socialists of America.

== Political career ==
=== Onondaga County Legislature ===
In 2023, Brown was elected to the Onondaga County Legislature for the 15th district.

=== New York State Assembly ===
For the 2026 New York State Assembly election, Brown won the Democratic primary against sitting representative Bill Magnarelli of the 129th district. In the general election he was elected to the New York State Assembly defeating the Republican candidate, Shawn Fiato.
