= Michael J. Hoblock Jr. =

American politician

Michael J. Hoblock Jr. (born July 4, 1942) is an American politician from New York.

== Life ==
He was born July 4, 1942, in Cohoes, New York. He attended La Salle Institute in Troy. He graduated B.B.A. in accounting from Siena College; and in 1967 from Albany Law School. He practices law, and entered politics as a Republican.

On February 14, 1978, he was elected to the New York State Assembly, to fill the vacancy caused by the election of Fred G. Field Jr. as Supervisor of the Town of Colonie. Hoblock was re-elected three times, and remained in the Assembly (103rd D.) until 1984, sitting in the 182nd, 183rd, 184th and 185th New York State Legislatures.

In November 1991, he was elected Albany County Executive He was a member of the New York State Senate in 1995 and 1996, winning by a shocking 18-point margin in what had historically been a heavily Democratic district. He was the first Republican to represent this district or its predecessors since 1922.

He ran for reelection in 1996, but the district reverted to form and he was defeated by Democrat Neil Breslin.

On May 6, 1997, Hoblock was appointed as Chairman of the New York State Racing and Wagering Board. He remained on the post until November 29, 2005.

In November 2009, he ran for Supervisor of the Town of Colonie, but was defeated by the incumbent Democrat Paula Mahan.

He lives in Loudonville.

New York State Assembly
Preceded by Fred G. Field Jr.	New York State Assembly; 103rd District; 1978–1984	Succeeded by Arnold W. Proskin
Political offices
Preceded by James J. Coyne Jr.	County Executive of Albany County, New York; 1992-1994	Succeeded by Michael G. Breslin
New York State Senate
Preceded by Howard C. Nolan Jr.	New York State Senate; 42nd District; 1995–1996	Succeeded by Neil Breslin
