= Phil Steck =

American politician (born 1959)

Member of the New York State Assembly from the 110th district
- Incumbent
- Assumed office January 1, 2013
- Preceded by: James N. Tedisco

Personal details
- Born: July 8, 1959 (age 67) New York City, New York, US
- Party: Democratic
- Other political affiliations: Independence; Working Families
- Children: 2
- Education: Harvard University, University of Pennsylvania School of Law
- Occupation: Attorney
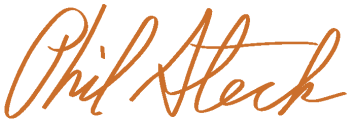
- Signature
- Website: Official website Campaign website

Phillip G. Steck (born July 8, 1959) is a Democratic member of the New York State Assembly representing Assembly District 110, which comprises the eastern portions of Schenectady and northern portions of Albany County.

== Early life and career ==
Steck is the son of Ernest, a high school athletic director, and Roselyn, a middle school teacher. He played varsity football and graduated the valedictorian of his class from The Albany Academy in 1977. He earned a degree in Government from Harvard University in 1981 and a law degree from the University of Pennsylvania Law School in 1984. In college, he interned on the staff of Congressman Ben Rosenthal. For several years after college, he worked as an assistant district attorney in New York and Rensselaer Counties. He then entered private practice for the Capital District law firm of Cooper Erving & Savage where he has worked ever since.

== Political career ==
Steck's political career began in 1999 when he was elected to the Albany County Legislature; he served three terms there.

In 2008, he ran for Congress in New York's 21st congressional district, but lost in the Democratic primary.

In 2012, Steck won a seat in the New York State Assembly.

He endorsed Bernie Sanders for the 2020 Primary.

Political offices
| Preceded by | Albany County, New York Legislator, 15th District; January 1, 2000 – December 31, 2012 | Vacant Title next held by Alison McLean Lane |
New York State Assembly
| Preceded by James N. Tedisco | New York State Assembly, 110th District; January 1, 2013 – present | Incumbent |
