= Jeff Gallahan =

American politician

Member of the New York State Assembly from the 131th district
- Incumbent
- Assumed office January 6, 2021
- Preceded by: Brian Kolb

Personal details
- Born: June 4, 1959 (age 67) Ontario County, New York, U.S.
- Party: Republican
- Children: 2

Jeff L. Gallahan (born June 4, 1959) is an American politician serving as a member of the New York State Assembly from the 131st district. Elected in November 2020, he assumed office on January 6, 2021.

== Early life ==
Gallahan is a native of Ontario County, New York.

== Career ==
He began his career a union machinist for the General Railway Signal Company before becoming a sales employee and manager. He and his wife founded CR7 Food Trailer and Catering in 2017. Gallahan served as a member of the Manchester, New York Town Council and as town supervisor of Manchester for 15 years. Gallahan was elected to the New York State Assembly in November 2020 and assumed office on January 6, 2021.
