= Notre Dame-Bishop Gibbons High School =

School in Schenectady, New York, United States

Notre Dame-Bishop Gibbons Middle & High School
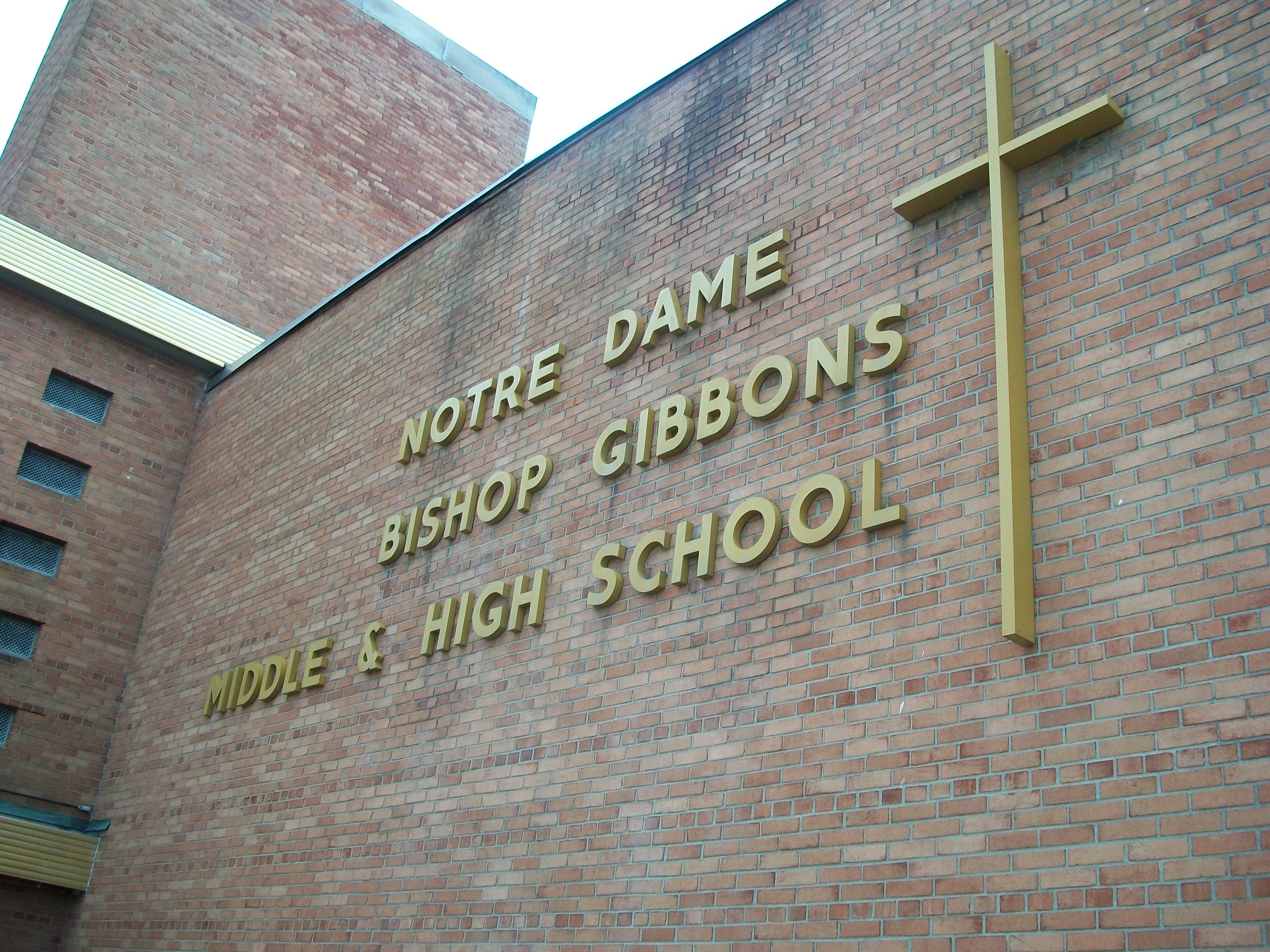

Location
- 2600 Albany Street; Schenectady, Schenectady County, New York 12304; United States
- Coordinates: 42°46′54″N 73°54′38″W

Information
- Type: Private, Coeducational
- Religious affiliation: Roman Catholic
- Established: 1958/1960
- Founder: Edmund Ignatius Rice
- Superintendent: Christopher Bott
- Chairperson: Matt Cotugno
- Dean: Tricia White
- Principal: James Mahoney
- Chaplain: Rev. Leo Markert
- Staff: 26
- Teaching staff: 18
- Grades: 6–12
- Colors: Maroon and Gold
- Athletics conference: Western Athletic Conference, Section 2
- Sports: Bowling, baseball, basketball, cross country, indoor track, outdoor track, volleyball, soccer
- Accreditation: Middle States Association of Colleges and Schools
- Newspaper: Knightly News
- Tuition: $7,583 (6), $8,058 (7-8), $8,658 (9-12)(2021-2022)
- Feeder schools: St. Madeleine Sophie(Schenectady), St. Mary’s(Amsterdam), St. Kateri Tekakwitha(Niskayuna), St. Thomas The Apostle(Delmar)
- Alumni: Congressman Antonio Delgado, State Assemblyman Jim Tedisco.
- Director of Development: Mickie Baldwin
- School Counselor: Sam South
- Admissions Director: Robert Andrea
- Athletic Director: Ann McCarthy
- Business Manager: Theresa Lewis
- Campus Minister: Matthew Houle
- Website: http://www.nd-bg.org/

Notre Dame-Bishop Gibbons High School is a private, Roman Catholic middle and high school in Schenectady, New York. It is located within the Roman Catholic Diocese of Albany. Enrollment for the 2021–2022 school year was 201 students. The 2021-2022 tuition was $7,583 (grade 6), $8,058 (7-8), and $8,658 (9-12).

== Background ==
Bishop Gibbons High School was established in 1958 as an all-boys school. Bishop Gibbons was founded by the Irish Christian brothers. Notre Dame High School was established in 1960 as an all-girls high school. Bishop Gibbons and Notre Dame merged in 1975. Grades 7 and 8 were added in 1989 and Grade 6 was added in 1996. They won the Class B NYSPHSAA State Men's Cross Country Championship in 2012. The first state championship in school history was in 1986 when the Girls' basketball team won the Class A NYSPHSAA tournament. The school principal is James Mahoney.

== Notable alumni ==
Jim Tedisco and Antonio Delgado both attended Bishop Gibbons.
