= Nathaniel Hezekiah III =

American politician

Member-elect of the New York State Assembly from the 32nd district
- Assuming office January 2027
- Succeeding: Vivian E. Cook

Personal details
- Party: Democratic

Nathaniel Hezekiah III is an American politician. A member of the Democratic Party, he is the member-elect for the 32nd district of the New York State Assembly.
