= Arnold W. Proskin =

American politician

Member of the New York State Assembly from the 107th district
- In office January 1, 1993 – December 31, 1994
- Preceded by: Jim Tedisco
- Succeeded by: Robert G. Prentiss

Member of the New York State Assembly from the 103rd district
- In office January 1, 1985 – December 31, 1992
- Preceded by: Michael J. Hoblock Jr.
- Succeeded by: Jim Tedisco

Personal details
- Born: April 2, 1938 (age 88) Albany, New York, U.S.
- Party: Republican

Arnold W. Proskin (born April 2, 1938) is an American lawyer and Republican politician from Albany County, New York. He was district attorney of Albany County from 1969 to 1973, a judge of the Albany County Court, and a member of the New York State Assembly from 1985 to 1994.

== Early life ==
Proskin was born in Albany on April 2, 1938. He served in the United States Navy from 1956 to 1958, attended the State University of New York at Albany, and took his law degree at Boston College Law School in 1964, the year he was admitted to the bar.

== District attorney ==
Proskin was elected district attorney of Albany County in November 1968 and re-elected in November 1971. No Republican has won the office since.

During his first term his office conducted a grand jury investigation into municipal corruption. When the county court ordered the grand jury's minutes turned over to a defendant, Proskin sought a writ of prohibition, which the Appellate Division granted and the New York Court of Appeals upheld in 1972.

He left the office at the end of 1973 to become a county judge. His chief assistant, Ralph W. Smith Jr., was appointed to succeed him and lost the 1974 election to Sol Greenberg by 487 votes.

== State Assembly ==
Proskin founded the Proskin Law Firm in Albany in 1977, after leaving the bench, and was elected to the Assembly in 1984. He served five terms.

In the spring of 1994 the Times Union published a series of articles on wills Proskin had drafted for clients that were rewritten to benefit him or members of his family. He lost that year's Republican primary. Robert G. Prentiss, a fellow Republican, won the seat in November.

== Later career ==
Proskin returned to full-time practice. In 2002 the United States Court of Appeals for the Second Circuit vacated a client's guilty plea, finding that Proskin had misled her about the immigration consequences of the plea and that she had not received effective assistance of counsel. A Times Union report on the decision by Andrew Tilghman closed by noting that Proskin's political career had faded after it became public that he had altered an elderly client's will to leave $49,000 to his own children. Proskin sued the paper and its parent, the Hearst Corporation, for $35 million, arguing that "altered" implied forgery. The Appellate Division upheld dismissal of the suit in 2005. Proskin had acknowledged in an affidavit that he changed the will at the client's direction, and the court held the statement true on that basis, noting that the article accused him of nothing illegal.

== Personal life ==
Proskin and his wife, Martha, have four children. Their daughter, Lisa Proskin, served six years as village justice of Menands and now leads the family firm.

Arnold Proskin was a bulwark of Republican politics in the Capital Region.
