= Howard C. Nolan Jr. =

American politician

Member of the New York State Senate
- In office 1975–1994
- Preceded by: Walter B. Langley
- Succeeded by: Michael J. Hoblock Jr.
- Constituency: 42nd district

Personal details
- Born: August 24, 1932 Albany, New York, U.S.
- Died: June 17, 2023 (aged 90) Fort Lauderdale, Florida, U.S.
- Resting place: Gerald B. H. Solomon Saratoga National Cemetery
- Party: Democratic
- Spouse(s): Geraldine Leonard; Shannon Logan
- Children: 7
- Education: College of the Holy Cross; Albany Law School
- Profession: Attorney

Military service
- Service: United States Marine Corps
- Years of service: 1957–1960
- Rank: First Lieutenant
- Unit: United States Marine Corps Judge Advocate Division

Howard C. Nolan Jr. (August 24, 1932 – June 17, 2023) was an attorney and politician from Albany, New York who served in the New York State Senate from 1975 to 1994.

== Early life ==
Howard Charles Nolan Jr. was born in Albany, New York, on August 24, 1932, the son of Howard C. Nolan Sr. and Helen (Burke) Nolan. He graduated from Christian Brothers Academy in Albany in 1950, the College of the Holy Cross in 1954, and Albany Law School in 1957. Nolan was admitted to the bar in 1958 and served in the United States Marine Corps from 1957 to 1960, attaining the rank of first lieutenant in the Judge Advocate Division. After returning from the military Nolan practiced law in Albany, and later was a co-founder of Nolan & Heller, LLP.

== Career ==
A Democrat, in 1974 he was elected to the New York State Senate from the 42nd District. Nolan was reelected every two years until 1992, and served from 1975 to 1994. (Note: Nolan sat in the 181st, 182nd, 183rd, 184th, 185th, 186th, 187th, 188th, 189th and 190th New York State Legislatures.) He did not run for reelection in 1994. In 1977, Nolan ran unsuccessfully for mayor of Albany, losing the Democratic primary to longtime incumbent Erastus Corning 2nd. During his time in the state senate, Nolan was one of the few Democrats who opposed the pro-choice position on abortion.

A longtime civic activist, Nolan served on the Board of Trustees for St. Peter’s Hospital. He also served on the board of directors of the State of New York Mortgage Agency, the Community Foundation for the Capital Region, and WMHT (TV). Nolan was chairman of the board of the Cerebral Palsy Foundation and the Center for the Disability Services, and was a member of the Marine Corps League, the Knights of Columbus, the Ancient Order of Hibernians, and the Albany Chamber of Commerce. In addition, he maintained an interest in horse racing, was the owner of several thoroughbreds, and served as president of New York Thoroughbred Breeders, Inc. and chairman of Breeders' Cup Ltd. One Nolan initiative while in the senate combined his interest in criminal justice policy with his background in horse racing; In conjunction with the New York State Department of Corrections and Community Supervision, he created the Thoroughbred Retirement Foundation in Wallkill, which provides sanctuary for retired racehorses and the opportunity for inmates to build life skills by participating in a vocational training program.

== Retirement and death ==
In retirement, Nolan lived in Delmar, New York and Pompano Beach, Florida. In 2002, he retired from practicing law and his firm resumed the name Cooper Erving & Savage. He died in Fort Lauderdale, Florida on June 17, 2023. He was buried at Gerald B. H. Solomon Saratoga National Cemetery.

Nolan was the subject of a memoir and biography, 2018's Politics and Ponies by Bill Heller.

== Family ==
Nolan was married first to Geraldine Leonard, with whom he was the father of seven children. They later divorced, and she died in 2016. Nolan's second wife was Shannon Logan, who survived him.

== Sources ==
- The Martindale-Hubbell Law Directory, Volumes 11-12. 1993.
- Howard C. Nolan at New York Thoroughbred Breeding and Development Fund Board of Directors
- Practicing Law at Troy Record, February 7, 1961
- 42nd Senate District Race at Troy Record, October 20, 1976
- Erastus Corning 2d, Albany Mayor Since '42, Dies at New York Times. May 29, 1983
- Former Senator Howard Nolan’s Great Loves: Horses and Politics at The Saratogian, July 29, 2012

New York State Senate
Preceded by Walter B. Langley	New York State Senate; 42nd District; 1975–1994	Succeeded by Michael J. Hoblock Jr.
