= David DiPietro =

American politician

David J. DiPietro

Member of the New York State Assembly from the 147th district
- Incumbent
- Assumed office January 1, 2013
- Preceded by: Daniel J. Burling

Mayor of East Aurora
- In office 2002–2008
- Preceded by: John V. Pagliaccio
- Succeeded by: Clark Crook

Personal details
- Born: June 22, 1960 (age 66) Buffalo, New York, U.S.
- Party: Republican
- Spouse: Theresa M. née Pimpo
- Children: 3
- Education: Wittenberg University
- Occupation: Politician
- Website: Official website

David J. DiPietro (born June 22, 1960) is a Republican member of the New York State Assembly representing Assembly District 147, which comprises the southern halves of Erie County, New York and Wyoming County, New York.

== Early life and career ==
DiPietro was born in Buffalo, New York. His parents moved the family to the Village of East Aurora where he subsequently attended Immaculate Conception Elementary and East Aurora High School. He earned a degree in business administration from Wittenberg University in 1985.

DiPietro began his career at M&T Bank in Buffalo but left after a few years to work as a consultant to small businesses. In 1991 he assumed control of his parents' dry cleaning business in Amherst, New York.

== Political career ==
He was elected a trustee of the Village of East Aurora in 1999 and mayor in 2002. After serving as mayor for six years, he set his sights on higher office, running in the Republican primary for the 59th New York State Senate District against incumbent Dale Volker in 2008 and challenger Patrick Gallivan in 2010. He ran unsuccessfully as the Tea Party candidate in the 2010 general election for the senate seat.

In 2012, he won a seat in the New York State Assembly, where he demonstrated conservative views. In 2013, he introduced legislation to repeal the NY SAFE Act. He voted against proposed medical marijuana legislation, the Compassionate Care Act (Bill A6357), and motions dated June 3, 2013 (94–41) and May 27, 2014 (94–63). DiPietro was one of 13 nay votes when the bill passed on June 20, 2014 (117–13). He voted against emergency access to medical marijuana (Bill A07060) on June 9, 2015; the bill passed, 130–18. However, DiPietro voted for adding opioid-use disorder (addiction) to the list of conditions treatable by medical marijuana (Bill A09016) on June 6, 2018 (108–28). In 2019 Assemblyman DiPietro became the Assembly sponsor of Bill# A05498 which proposes a constitutional amendment to divide the state into three autonomous regions. DiPietro voted against key votes related to policies concerning affirmative action, paid family leave, increasing the minimum wage and prohibiting workplace discrimination based on reproductive health decisions. He voted against state-funded projects addressing climate change and a three-year prohibition of hydraulic fracturing.

Political offices
Preceded by John V. Pagliaccio	East Aurora, New York Mayor; April 2002 – March 2008	Succeeded by Clark W. Crook
New York State Assembly
Preceded by Daniel J. Burling	New York State Assembly, 147th District; January 1, 2013 – present	Incumbent
