= Hugh Farley =

American politician

Member of the New York State Senate
- In office January 1, 1977 – December 31, 2016
- Preceded by: Fred Isabella
- Succeeded by: Jim Tedisco
- Constituency: 44th district (1977-2012); 49th district (2013-2016)

Personal details
- Born: November 26, 1932 (age 93) Watertown, New York, U.S.
- Party: Republican
- Spouse: Sharon Farley
- Children: 3
- Education: University of Albany (BS); American University (JD)
- Website: Official website

Hugh T. Farley (born November 26, 1932) is an American attorney, professor and Republican politician from Schenectady County, New York. He served as a member of the New York Senate from 1977 until his 2016 retirement.

== Early life and family ==
Farley was born in Watertown, New York, and raised in Indian Lake, New York. He graduated from high school in Watertown. Farley served in the U.S. Army and then was a high school teacher in Syracuse, New York, and Maryland. Farley holds a Juris Doctor from American University School of Law, as well as a Bachelor of Science from the SUNY Albany. He is also a graduate of Mohawk Valley Community College.

Farley and his wife, Sharon, have been married for more than 57 years and have three children.

== Career ==
Farley served in the U.S. Army and then was a high school teacher in Syracuse, New York, and Maryland.

In 1965, Farley became a member of the faculty at the School of Business of the SUNY Albany. He later became Full Professor and Law Area Coordinator. In 2000, he became a Professor Emeritus of Business Law at the college.

=== Political career ===
Farley was first elected to the New York State Senate in 1976. During his career, he represented all or portions of Schenectady, Saratoga, Herkimer, Hamilton, and Fulton Counties.

In 1979, Farley was chosen as the first Chairman of the Senate Standing Committee on Aging. As chairman, Farley authored laws creating New York's hospice care system and a law prohibiting mandatory medical intervention/treatment for terminally ill patients. In 1989, Farley was appointed Chair of the Senate Committee on Banks. In this capacity, he authored or sponsored numerous laws dealing with banking regulations, including a law enacted in 1994 aimed at making New York's interest rate deregulation laws permanent.

Farley was a member of the Governor's Commission on Libraries, and was an elected delegate to the White House's Conference on Libraries in both 1979 and 1991. He also chaired the State Senate's Select Committee on Libraries; in that role, he became known as a national leader and advocate for libraries and reading programs.

Farley sponsored legislation establishing the Schenectady County Metroplex Development Authority.

Farley voted against same-sex marriage legislation on December 2, 2009, and the bill was defeated. His 2010 opponent, Democrat Susan Savage, denounced Farley's position at an October 2010 rally on the steps of the New York State Capitol. Farley defeated Savage and was re-elected with one of the largest margins in the state. In 2011, Farley again voted against allowing same-sex marriage in New York during a Senate roll-call on the Marriage Equality Act, which passed after a close 33-29 vote. In 2011, New York legalized same-sex marriage;

Farley announced that he would not seek re-election in 2016. He served in the Senate for 40 years. At the time of his retirement, he was the second-longest-serving member in New York State Senate history.

New York State Senate
Preceded by Fred Isabella	Member of the New York State Senate from the 44th district 1977–2012	Succeeded by Neil Breslin
Preceded by David J. Valesky	Member of the New York State Senate from the 49th district 2013–2016	Succeeded by Jim Tedisco
