= Jack Quinn III =

American politician

Member of the New York State Assembly from the 146th district
- In office 2004–2010
- Preceded by: Richard A. Smith
- Succeeded by: Kevin Smardz

Personal details
- Born: 1978 (age 47–48)
- Party: Republican
- Education: University at Buffalo Law School
- Profession: Politician, attorney

John Francis "Jack" Quinn III (born 1978) is a former Republican New York State Assembly Member, representing Erie County.

== Background ==
A resident of Hamburg, New York, Quinn is the son of former U.S. Congress Representative Jack Quinn. Quinn was elected as his father was retiring from Congress.

== Education ==
Quinn graduated from Saint Francis High School, Siena College, and the University at Buffalo Law School with honors. As a law school student, Quinn also interned in the Washington, DC office of Congressman James T. Walsh. In this capacity, he had a focus on constituent, citizen action, and lobbyist relations.

== Early career ==
While in law school, Quinn worked at law firms in the Buffalo, New York and Washington, DC areas. He also worked at the New York State Office of Science, Technology, and Academic Research.

== Political career ==
=== As Assistant District Attorney in Erie County, New York ===
Quinn is a former Assistant District Attorney in Erie County, New York.

=== As New York State Assembly Member ===
Quinn was first elected to the 146th District of the New York State Assembly in 2004; and simultaneously worked for the law firm, Shaw & Shaw, P.C. At the start of 2006, he was appointed as the Ranking Minority Member of the Assembly Judiciary Committee. He is a former Ranking Minority Member of the Assembly Alcoholism and Drug Abuse Committee, and a former Ranking Minority Member of the Assembly Tourism Committee.

==== Political interests ====
Quinn's interests are in the areas of labor, the environment, crime, and the military. As Assembly Member, one of his aims was to obtain increased resources for New York's law enforcement officers to combat violent crime.

=== New York State Senate election ===
In 2010, Quinn ran for a seat in the New York State Senate, 58th District. His campaign was helped when longtime incumbent William Stachowski was defeated in the Democratic primary, but remained on the ballot for two minor parties. In the general election, Quinn was narrowly defeated in this closely watched race by Erie County Legislator Timothy Kennedy.

Prior to the election, Quinn announced his plan to reduce the State budget by more than $8 billion.

In an August 19, 2010 article in The Buffalo News, in regard to his plan to reduce the State budget, Quinn was quoted, stating:

It is time we have responsible leadership in Albany who understand that there are no sacred cows in the state budget [and] who are not afraid to make the necessary decisions for Western New York.

== Selected electoral history ==
Quinn's electoral history can be found, online, at Our Campaigns, and a portion of it is reflected here.

New York State Senate, 58th District Election, November 2, 2010
| Party | Candidate | Votes | % |
|---|---|---|---|
| Democratic | Timothy M. Kennedy | 42,757 | 47.23 |
| Republican | Jack Quinn III | 41,162 | 45.47 |
| Independence | William Stachowski | 6,611 | 7.30 |

- Quinn also ran on the Taxpayers Party line in this election.

New York State Assembly, 146th District Election, November 2, 2004
| Party | Candidate | Votes | % |
|---|---|---|---|
| Republican | Jack Quinn III | 31,595 | 52.64 |
| Democratic | Francis J. Pordum | 21,601 | 35.99 |
| Independence | Patrick Hoak | 6,828 | 11.38 |

- Quinn also ran on the Sportsman's Rights ticket in this election.

== Community involvement ==
Quinn has been active in several community groups, including the University of Buffalo Law School Alumni Association, the Erie County Bar Association and New York State Bar Association, the St. Francis High School Alumni Association, St. Mary of the Lake Church, and Ducks Unlimited.

New York State Assembly
| Preceded by Richard A. Smith | New York State Assembly, 146th District; 2004–2010 | Succeeded by Kevin Smardz |
