= Minita Sanghvi =

Indian-American politician, professor and author

Commissioner of Finance of the City of Saratoga Springs, New York
- Incumbent
- Assumed office January 1, 2021

Personal details
- Born: Minita Sanghvi; March 6, 1977 (age 49) Mumbai, India
- Party: Democratic
- Spouse: Megan Dimaio
- Education: Narsee Monjee College of Commerce and Economics (BCom); Narsee Monjee Institute for Management Studies (MBA); University of Arizona (MS); Duke University (Cert.); University of North Carolina at Greensboro (PhD)
- Occupation: Politician; Author; Academic; Educator
- Website: Official website; Skidmore faculty page

Minita Sanghvi (born March 6, 1977) is an Indian-American politician, author, academic, activist, and educator. She currently serves as the first openly gay and first woman of color city council member in Saratoga Springs, New York, and works at Skidmore College as an associate professor in the Management and Business Department. At Skidmore, her research focuses on political marketing, transformative consumer research, and gender and race discrimination in consumptionscapes and marketing.

== Early life and education ==
Sanghvi was born in Mumbai, India into a Gujarati family. She studied at Narsee Monjee College of Commerce and Economics, majoring in accounting. She later won a government scholarship to Narsee Monjee Institute for Management Studies where she received her MBA. In 2004, she graduated from the University of Arizona with a master's in retailing and consumer sciences. After working in industry for a few years, she earned a PhD from the Bryan School of Business at the University of North Carolina at Greensboro. While she was studying at UNCG, she received a certificate in feminist studies from Duke University.

At the University of North Carolina at Greensboro, Sanghvi won the 2011–12 Outstanding Teaching Assistant Award and the 2014 Outstanding Dissertation Award, making her the second person in the university's history to win both.

== Activism and politics ==
After coming out in 2002, Sanghvi has been a vocal advocate for equal rights, fighting against the 2006 Arizona Proposition 107 which proposed same-sex marriage. The proposition ultimately failed in the Arizona elections. She served on the Board of Governors for the Human Rights Campaign and Guilford Green Foundation in North Carolina. She has written about her coming out experience in an Indian family and her marriage in the Arizona Daily Wildcat Times of India, and Albany Times Union to educate and advocate for equal rights in India.

After moving to Saratoga Springs in Upstate New York, Sanghvi joined the Charter Review Commission for the City. The charter change lost by 10 votes. After the 2016 election, the mayor of Saratoga Springs, Joanne Yepsen started a Human Rights Task Force with Sanghvi serving as one of the founding members.

In 2021, Sanghvi, a Democrat, won the race for Saratoga Springs' Commissioner of Finance with 49% of the votes with her Republican opponent, Joanne Kiernan, receiving 42%. Other candidates in the race included Adam Israel, who ran as an Independent, and Sierra Hunt, who ran as the candidate from the Working Families Party. Israel and Sierra received 6% and less than 1% of the vote respectively.

During her first term as Commissioner of Finance, Sanghvi introduced Participatory Budgeting to Saratoga Springs. The program has found success in the town, funding 9 projects in the first cycle. She also oversaw the funding of Saratoga Springs' third fire station in 2022.

Before serving on the city council, Sanghvi served for five years on the Saratoga Springs Public Library Board of Trustees.

Sanghvi ran for the New York State Senate in 2024, challenging incumbent senator Jim Tedisco, a Republican member of the State Senate from the 44th District. She lost to Tedisco in the general election and received 42% of the vote.

== Writing ==
Sanghvi has authored both fiction and non-fiction books. Her non-fiction book, Gender and Political Marketing in the United States and the 2016 Presidential Election: An Analysis of Why She Lost, was published by Palgrave MacMillan in 2018. The book focuses on issues women face in United States Politics such as ageism, fattism, racism, and sexism while delving into Clinton and Trump's campaigns, analyzing the role of gender and marketing in the 2016 presidential election. One such example from the book examines the masculinity showcased in former President Trump's campaign logo. The book also includes the introduction of Sanghvi's four C's of Political Marketing Mix - a take on Lauterborn's four C's of Marketing Mix.

In 2022, Sanghvi's fiction book, Happy Endings, was published by HarperCollins India. It is considered to be India's first lesbian romance novel. Happy Endings was Long-Listed for the AutHer Awards in 2023.
