= New York's 147th State Assembly district =

American legislative district

Assemblymember
David DiPietro; R–East Aurora

New York's 147th State Assembly district is one of the 150 districts in the New York State Assembly. It has been represented by David DiPietro since 2013.

== Geography ==
District 147 contains all of Wyoming County except the town of Perry and the southern portion of Erie County.

The 2nd district overlaps New York's 23rd and 24th congressional districts, as well as the 57th and 60th districts of the New York State Senate

== Recent election results ==
=== 2026 ===
2026 New York State Assembly election, District 147
Party	Candidate	Votes	%
Republican	David DiPietro		
Conservative	David DiPietro		
Total	David DiPietro (incumbent)		
Write-in			
Total votes			

=== 2024 ===
2024 New York State Assembly election, District 147
Primary election
Party	Candidate	Votes	%
Republican	David DiPietro (incumbent)	5,712	81.4
Republican	Mitch Martin	1,290	18.4
Write-in		13	0.2
Total votes		7,015	100.0
General election
Republican	David DiPietro	43,852	
Conservative	David DiPietro	8,395	
Total	David DiPietro (incumbent)	52,247	68.0
Democratic	Darci Cramer	24,555	32.0
Write-in		49	0.0
Total votes		76,851	100.0
Republican hold			

=== 2022 ===
2022 New York State Assembly election, District 147
Party	Candidate	Votes	%
Republican	David DiPietro	36,803	
Conservative	David DiPietro	10,333	
Total	David DiPietro (incumbent)	47,136	98.7
Write-in		628	1.3
Total votes		47,764	100.0
Republican hold			

=== 2020 ===
2020 New York State Assembly election, District 147
Party	Candidate	Votes	%
Republican	David DiPietro	43,610	
Conservative	David DiPietro	8,807	
Independence	David DiPietro	4,438	
Total	David DiPietro (incumbent)	39,964	96.1
Write-in		1,627	3.9
Total votes		41,591	100.0
Republican hold			

=== 2018 ===
2018 New York State Assembly election, District 147
Party	Candidate	Votes	%
Republican	David DiPietro	43,610	
Conservative	David DiPietro	8,807	
Independence	David DiPietro	4,438	
Total	David DiPietro (incumbent)	32,757	60.9
Democratic	Luke Wochensky	19,036	
Working Families	Luke Wochensky	2,016	
Total	Luke Wochensky	21,052	39.1
Write-in		3	0.0
Total votes		53,812	100.0
Republican hold			

=== 2016 ===
2016 New York State Assembly election, District 147
Party	Candidate	Votes	%
Republican	David DiPietro	38,034	
Conservative	David DiPietro	8,712	
Independence	David DiPietro	4,298	
Reform	David DiPietro	514	
Total	David DiPietro (incumbent)	51,558	100.0
Write-in		13	0.0
Total votes		51,571	100.0
Republican hold			

=== 2014 ===
2014 New York State Assembly election, District 147
Party	Candidate	Votes	%
Republican	David DiPietro	24,712	
Conservative	David DiPietro	8,788	
Total	David DiPietro (incumbent)	33,500	99.9
Write-in		20	0.1
Total votes		33,520	100.0
Republican hold			

=== 2012 ===
2012 New York State Assembly election, District 147
Primary election
Party	Candidate	Votes	%
Republican	David DiPietro	2,751	43.8
Republican	David Mariacher	2,387	38.1
Republican	Daniel Humiston	821	13.1
Republican	Christopher Lane	315	5.0
Write-in		0	0.0
Total votes		6,274	100
Independence	Christina Abt	202	71.4
Independence	Daniel Humiston	81	28.6
Write-in		0	0.0
Total votes		283	100
General election
Republican	David DiPietro	27,256	
Conservative	David DiPietro	5,145	
Total	David DiPietro	32,401	55.4
Democratic	Christina Abt	20,850	
Working Families	Christina Abt	2,854	
Independence	Christina Abt	2,405	
Total	Christina Abt	26,109	44.6
Write-in		18	0.0
Total votes		58,528	100.0
Republican hold			
