= New York's 131st State Assembly district =

American legislative district

Assemblymember
Jeff Gallahan; R–Manchester

New York's 131st State Assembly district is one of the 150 districts in the New York State Assembly. It has been represented by Jeff Gallahan since 2021, succeeding Brian Kolb. In 2026, he announced that he would not run for re-election.

== Geography ==
=== 2020s ===
==== 2022 ====
District 131 contains portions of Ontario, Cayuga, Cortland, Madison, Chenango, Broome and Seneca counties.

=== 2010s ===
District 131 contained all of Ontario County and portions of Seneca County.

== Recent election results ==
=== 2026 ===
2026 New York State Assembly election, District 131
Party	Candidate	Votes	%
Republican	Mark Benjamin		
Conservative	Mark Benjamin		
Total	Mark Benjamin		
Democratic	Philip Fleming		
Write-in			
Total votes			

=== 2024 ===
2024 New York State Assembly election, District 131
Party	Candidate	Votes	%
Republican	Jeff Gallahan	41,537	
Conservative	Jeff Gallahan	7,713	
Total	Jeff Gallahan (incumbent)	49,250	99.2
Write-in		383	0.8
Total votes		49,633	100.0
Republican hold			

=== 2022 ===
2022 New York State Assembly election, District 131
Party	Candidate	Votes	%
Republican	Jeff Gallahan	30,683	
Conservative	Jeff Gallahan	5,975	
Total	Jeff Gallahan (incumbent)	36,658	99.4
Write-in		221	0.6
Total votes		36,879	100.0
Republican hold			

=== 2020 ===
2020 New York State Assembly election, District 131
Primary election
Party	Candidate	Votes	%
Republican	Jeff Gallahan	3,479	38.5
Republican	Cindy Wade	3,077	34.1
Republican	Jeff Shipley	1,556	17.2
Republican	Ann Marie Heizmann	911	10.1
Write-in		10	0.1
Total votes		9,033	100
General election
Republican	Jeff Gallahan	32,486	
Conservative	Jeff Gallahan	4,661	
Total	Jeff Gallahan	37,147	56.1
Democratic	Matthew Miller	27,817	42.0
SAM	Cynthia Wade	1,220	1.9
Write-in		24	0.3
Total votes		66,208	100.0
Republican hold			

=== 2018 ===
2018 New York State Assembly election, District 131
Party	Candidate	Votes	%
Republican	Brian Kolb	31,574	
Conservative	Brian Kolb	5,172	
Independence	Brian Kolb	2,056	
Total	Brian Kolb (incumbent)	38,802	99.1
Write-in		336	0.9
Total votes		39,138	100.0
Republican hold			

=== 2016 ===
2016 New York State Assembly election, District 131
Party	Candidate	Votes	%
Republican	Brian Kolb	36,746	
Conservative	Brian Kolb	5,252	
Independence	Brian Kolb	4,831	
Reform	Brian Kolb	885	
Total	Brian Kolb (incumbent)	47,714	99.5
Write-in		217	0.5
Total votes		47,931	100.0
Republican hold			

=== 2014 ===
2014 New York State Assembly election, District 131
Party	Candidate	Votes	%
Republican	Brian Kolb	25,754	
Conservative	Brian Kolb	5,574	
Total	Brian Kolb (incumbent)	31,328	99.5
Write-in		150	0.5
Total votes		31,478	100.0
Republican hold			

=== 2012 ===
2012 New York State Assembly election, District 131
Party	Candidate	Votes	%
Republican	Brian Kolb	34,037	
Independence	Brian Kolb	5,193	
Conservative	Brian Kolb	4,983	
Total	Brian Kolb (incumbent)	44,213	99.7
Write-in		127	0.3
Total votes		44,340	100.0
Republican hold			
