= Kevin Smardz =

American politician

Kevin S. Smardz

Member of the New York State Assembly from the 146th district
- In office 2011–2012
- Preceded by: Jack Quinn III
- Succeeded by: Raymond W. Walter

Personal details
- Born: December 12, 1975 (age 50) Buffalo, New York
- Party: Republican
- Spouse: divorced
- Children: two
- Education: Buffalo State College
- Profession: politician
- Website: Official website

Kevin S. Smardz (born December 12, 1975) is an American Republican politician. In 2010, he was elected to an open seat in the New York State Assembly for the 146th district in southern Erie County, New York, which includes Blasdell, Boston, Brant, Collins, Concord, Eden, Evans, Hamburg, Holland, Lackawanna, North Collins, and Sardinia.

Smardz earned a degree in Communications and Broadcasting from Buffalo State College. Upon graduating, he worked in Western New York for various television stations and video production companies. For the past decade, he has served as the Media Director for the Southtowns Christian Center in Hamburg, New York. In 2007, Smardz was elected as a Town Councilman on the Hamburg Town Board and served until he was elected to the State Assembly. He is currently a member of the Hamburg Industrial Development Agency.

Political offices
Preceded by At large	Hamburg, New York Town Councilman; January 1, 2008 – December 31, 2010	Succeeded by At large
New York State Assembly
Preceded by John F. "Jack" Quinn, III	New York State Assembly, 146th District; January 1, 2011 – December 31, 2012	Succeeded by Raymond W. Walter
