= Daniel Burling =

American politician

Daniel J. Burling

Member of the New York State Assembly from the 147th district
- In office January 1999 – December 2012
- Preceded by: Thomas M. Reynolds
- Succeeded by: David DiPietro

Personal details
- Born: January 11, 1947 (age 79) Batavia, New York, U.S.
- Party: Republican
- Spouse: Jean
- Children: two
- Education: University at Buffalo
- Profession: pharmacist, politician
- Website: Official website

Daniel J. "Dan" Burling (born January 11, 1947) was a Republican member of the New York State Assembly representing Assembly District 147, which comprises a number of communities located in Upstate New York, including Allegany County, Genesee County, Livingston County, and Wyoming County. He was formerly the Minority Whip in the Assembly.

== Early life and career ==
Burling was born in Batavia, New York. He graduated from Ilion High School, after which he enlisted in the U.S. Marine Corps (1965–1969), including a tour in Vietnam. A licensed pilot and aircraft mechanic, he was the airport manager at Nellis Airport in Fort Plain in 1972. He graduated from the Empire State Military Academy, receiving a commission as a Second Lieutenant in the U.S. Army Reserve in 1976.

Burling graduated from Herkimer County Community College in 1977, then received a B.S. degree from the University at Buffalo School of Pharmacy in 1980. A registered pharmacist, he owns Burling Drug, Inc., which had a location in Attica (1987–1996) and another in Corfu (1991–present). He also was an intern and staff pharmacist at Genesee Memorial Hospital and a consulting pharmacist at the Genesee County Nursing Home in Batavia.

== Political career ==
Burling was a member of the Genesee County Legislature from 1993 until 1998. He was first elected to the New York State Assembly in 1998. He won the November 2008 general election with 71 percent of the vote and ran uncontested in the November 2010 general election. Burling did not seek reelection in 2012.

== Personal life ==
Burling and his wife Jean reside in the Town of Alexander. They have two children, Mary and David.

Political offices
Preceded by	Genesee County, New York Legislator, 6th District; January 1, 1993 – December 31, 1998	Succeeded by
New York State Assembly
Preceded by Thomas M. Reynolds	New York State Assembly, 147th District; January 1, 1999 – December 31, 2012	Succeeded by David DiPietro
