= Neil Breslin =

American politician

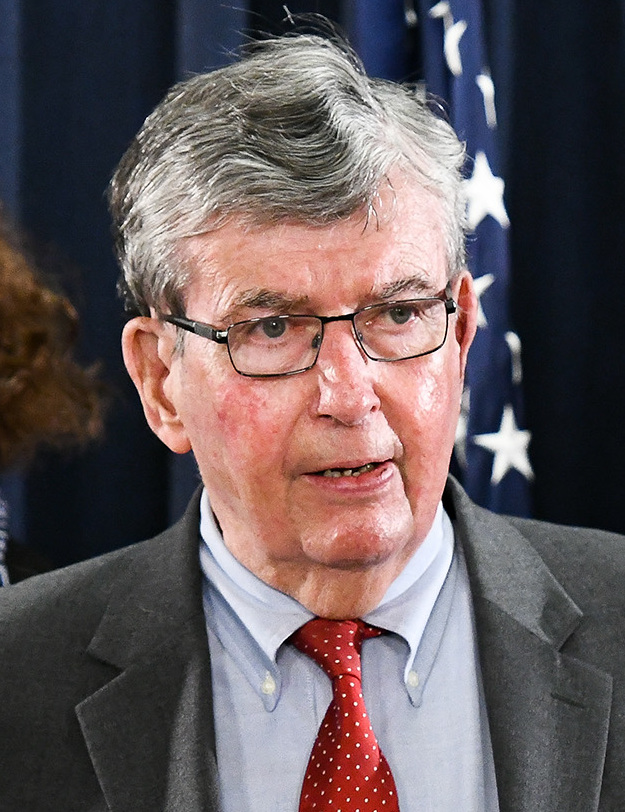

Member of the New York State Senate
- In office January 1, 1997 – December 31, 2024
- Preceded by: Michael J. Hoblock Jr.
- Succeeded by: Patricia Fahy
- Constituency: 42nd district (1997–2002); 46th district (2003–2012); 44th district (2013–2022); 46th district (2023–2024)

Personal details
- Born: June 9, 1942 (age 84) Albany, New York, U.S.
- Party: Democratic
- Spouse: Ellen
- Education: Fordham College
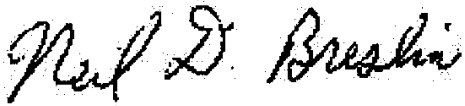
- Signature
- Website: Campaign website Official website

Neil David Breslin (born June 9, 1942) is an American attorney and politician who served as a member of the New York State Senate. As a Democrat, he has represented a district based in the state capital, Albany, since 1997. He represented parts of Albany and Schenectady counties and all of Montgomery County, including the cities of Albany, Rotterdam, and Amsterdam.

Breslin was the longest-tenured member of the New York State Senate, having served for 28 years.

== Biography ==
Breslin graduated from Fordham University in 1964, and received his law degree from the University of Toledo College of Law. In law school he was editor-in-chief of the Law Review and selected as the outstanding student in his class.

After being admitted to the bar, Breslin worked in Albany as an associate at the firm of Garry Cahill & Edmunds, later becoming a partner in the reorganized Garry, Cahill, Edmunds & Breslin. In 1981, he began practicing with his brothers Michael and Thomas (who later became a longtime state court judge), forming the firm Breslin, Breslin, and Breslin. He later served as an "of counsel" attorney with the firm Hiscock & Barclay. Breslin also acted as legal counsel for St. Anne’s Institute in Albany and was Vice President of the Interfaith Partnership for the Homeless from 1994 to 1998.

== New York Senate ==
Breslin was first elected to the State Senate in 1996, defeating one-term Republican incumbent Michael Hoblock by just over eight points. However, he has never faced another contest even that close in what has historically been one of the few safe Democratic districts in Upstate, and has been reelected every 2 years since. He has only dropped below 60% of the vote once since then, in 2010, but even then won by 13 points.

Hoblock had previously served as Albany County Executive and was succeeded by Neil Breslin's brother Michael after Hoblock won the State Senate seat in 1994.

Breslin had two challengers in the 2008 Democratic Primary, who cited Breslin's continued service in a law firm and family connections (one brother a county executive, the other a judge) as possible conflicts of interest. He won the primary in September 2008 with more than 50% of the vote. He was re-elected on November 4, 2008.

Breslin voted in favor of same-sex marriage legislation on December 2, 2009; the bill was defeated.

Breslin's 2010 bid for re-election got off to a rocky start, as the Candidate Review Committee of the Albany County Democratic Party voted to recommend no endorsement in his Senate race. Breslin was criticized during his 2010 primary campaign against Luke Martland for failing to answer questions about the content of multiple pieces of legislation he sponsored as the chair of the Insurance Committee.

When the Democrats took the majority in 2018, Breslin served as the Chairman of the Committee on Insurance.

== Personal life ==
Breslin is a native of Albany and a lifetime resident of the Capital District.

== See also ==
- 2009 New York State Senate leadership crisis

New York State Senate
Preceded by Michael J. Hoblock Jr.	New York State Senate, 42nd District; 1997–2002	Succeeded by John Bonacic
Preceded by James W. Wright	New York State Senate, 46th District; 2003–2012	Succeeded by Cecilia Tkaczyk
Preceded by Hugh Farley	New York State Senate, 44th District; 2013–present	Succeeded by Incumbent
