= New York's 129th State Assembly district =

American legislative district

Assemblymember
Bill Magnarelli; D–Syracuse

New York's 129th State Assembly district is one of the 150 districts in the New York State Assembly. It has been represented by Democrat Bill Magnarelli since 1999.

== Geography ==
District 129 is in Onondaga County. It contains portions of the city of Syracuse, as well as the surrounding towns of Geddes and Van Buren. Syracuse University is within this district.

== Recent election results ==
=== 2026 ===
2026 New York State Assembly election, District 129
Primary election
Party	Candidate	Votes	%
Democratic	Maurice Brown	3,473	50.7
Democratic	Bill Magnarelli (incumbent)	3,366	49.2
Write-in		6	0.1
Total votes		6,845	100.0
General election
Democratic	Maurice Brown		
Working Families	Maurice Brown		
Total	Maurice Brown		
Republican	Shawn Fiato		
Conservative	Shawn Fiato		
Total	Shawn Fiato		
Write-in			
Total votes			100.0

=== 2024 ===
2024 New York State Assembly election, District 129
Party	Candidate	Votes	%
Democratic	Bill Magnarelli (incumbent)	35,165	98.5
Write-in		527	1.5
Total votes		35,692	100.0
Democratic hold			

=== 2022 ===
2022 New York State Assembly election, District 129
Party	Candidate	Votes	%
Democratic	Bill Magnarelli (incumbent)	24,143	99.0
Write-in		235	1.0
Total votes		24,378	100.0
Democratic hold			

=== 2020 ===
2020 New York State Assembly election, District 129
Party	Candidate	Votes	%
Democratic	Bill Magnarelli	32,500	
Independence	Bill Magnarelli	1,707	
Total	Bill Magnarelli (incumbent)	34,207	71.5
Republican	Edward Weber Jr.	11,406	
Conservative	Edward Weber Jr.	2,200	
Total	Edward Weber Jr.	13,606	28.4
Write-in		43	0.1
Total votes		47,856	100.0
Democratic hold			

=== 2018 ===
2018 New York State Assembly election, District 129
Party	Candidate	Votes	%
Democratic	Bill Magnarelli	24,702	
Independence	Bill Magnarelli	1,680	
Women's Equality	Bill Magnarelli	555	
Total	Bill Magnarelli (incumbent)	26,937	73.9
Republican	Edward Ott	7,747	21.2
Conservative	Michael Hunter	1,715	4.7
Write-in		72	0.2
Total votes		36,471	100.0
Democratic hold			

=== 2016 ===
2016 New York State Assembly election, District 129
Party	Candidate	Votes	%
Democratic	Bill Magnarelli	28,905	
Independence	Bill Magnarelli	2,776	
Working Families	Bill Magnarelli	2,372	
Women's Equality	Bill Magnarelli	694	
Total	Bill Magnarelli (incumbent)	34,747	99.3
Write-in		301	0.7
Total votes		35,008	100.0
Democratic hold			

=== 2014 ===
2014 New York State Assembly election, District 129
Party	Candidate	Votes	%
Democratic	Bill Magnarelli	16,965	
Working Families	Bill Magnarelli	1,432	
Independence	Bill Magnarelli	1,391	
Total	Bill Magnarelli (incumbent)	19,788	72.0
Republican	Richard Zaccaria	5,901	
Conservative	Richard Zaccaria	1,751	
Total	Richard Zaccaria	7,652	27.8
Write-in		42	0.2
Total votes		27,482	100.0
Democratic hold			

=== 2012 ===
2012 New York State Assembly election, District 129
Party	Candidate	Votes	%
Democratic	Bill Magnarelli	29,535	
Working Families	Bill Magnarelli	3,181	
Independence	Bill Magnarelli	3,058	
Total	Bill Magnarelli (incumbent)	35,774	99.4
Write-in		219	0.6
Total votes		35,993	100.0
Democratic hold			
