= New York's 49th State Senate district =

American legislative district

Senator
Mark Walczyk; R–Watertown
- Registration: 36.3% Republican; 31.2% Democratic; 24.1% No party preference
- Demographics: 83% White; 6% Black; 5% Hispanic; 3% Asian
- Population (2017): 292,423
- Registered voters: 197,354

New York's 49th State Senate district is one of 63 districts in the State Senate of the U.S. state of New York. It has been represented by Republican Mark Walczyk since 2023.

== Geography ==
District 49 is located in northern New York covering all of Hamilton, Fulton, Jefferson, and Lewis Counties, as well as parts of Herkimer, Oswego, and St. Lawrence Counties.

The district overlaps with New York's 21st and 24th congressional districts, and with the 110th, 111th, 112th, 113th, 114th, and 120th districts of the New York State Assembly.

== Recent election results ==
=== 2026 ===
2026 New York State Senate election, District 49
Party	Candidate	Votes	%
Republican	Mark Walczyk		
Conservative	Mark Walczyk		
Total	Mark Walczyk (incumbent)		
Democratic	Cassie Robbins-Forbus		
Working Families	Cassie Robbins-Forbus		
Total	Cassie Robbins-Forbus		
Write-in			
Total votes			

=== 2024 ===
2024 New York State Senate election, District 49
Party	Candidate	Votes	%
Republican	Mark Walczyk	94,382	
Conservative	Mark Walczyk	13,737	
Total	Mark Walczyk (incumbent)	108,119	99.4
Write-in		599	0.6
Total votes		108,718	100.0
Republican hold			

=== 2022 ===
2022 New York State Senate election, District 49
Party	Candidate	Votes	%
Republican	Mark Walczyk	73,212	
Conservative	Mark Walczyk	10,026	
Total	Mark Walczyk	83,238	99.5
Write-in		388	0.5
Total votes		83,626	100.0
Republican hold			

=== 2020 ===
2020 New York State Senate election, District 49
Primary election
Party	Candidate	Votes	%
Democratic	Thearse McCalmon	10,671	73.3
Democratic	Donovan McRae	3,816	26.2
Write-in		66	0.5
Total votes		14,553	100.0
General election
Republican	James Tedisco	78,404	
Conservative	James Tedisco	9,982	
Independence	James Tedisco	3,549	
Total	James Tedisco (incumbent)	91,935	63.5
Democratic	Thearse McCalmon	52,781	36.4
Write-in		73	0.1
Total votes		144,789	100.0
Republican hold			

=== 2018 ===
2018 New York State Senate election, District 49
Primary election
Party	Candidate	Votes	%
Reform	James Tedisco (incumbent)	1,099	72.8
Reform	Michelle Ostrelich	401	26.6
Write-in		10	0.6
Total votes		1,510	100.0
General election
Republican	James Tedisco	54,556	
Conservative	James Tedisco	7,172	
Independence	James Tedisco	2,331	
Reform	James Tedisco	494	
Total	James Tedisco (incumbent)	64,553	59.3
Democratic	Michelle Ostrelich	41,059	
Working Families	Michelle Ostrelich	2,075	
Women's Equality	Michelle Ostrelich	1,151	
Total	Michelle Ostrelich	44,285	40.7
Write-in		29	0.6
Total votes		108,867	100.0
Republican hold			

=== 2016 ===
2016 New York State Senate election, District 49
Primary election
Party	Candidate	Votes	%
Republican	James Tedisco	9,010	62.4
Republican	Christian Klueg II	5,429	37.6
Write-in		0	0.0
Total votes		14,439	100.0
General election
Republican	James Tedisco	73,066	
Conservative	James Tedisco	9,166	
Independence	James Tedisco	4,311	
Reform	James Tedisco	563	
Total	James Tedisco	87,056	69.1
Democratic	Chad Putman	35,697	
Working Families	Chad Putman	2,314	
Women's Equality	Chad Putman	873	
Total	Chad Putman	38,884	30.9
Write-in		57	0.0
Total votes		125,997	100.0
Republican hold			

=== 2014 ===
2014 New York State Senate election, District 49
Primary election
Party	Candidate	Votes	%
Democratic	Madelyn Thorne	4,514	64.6
Democratic	Patti Southworth	2,477	35.4
Write-in		0	0.0
Total votes		6,991	100.0
General election
Republican	Hugh Farley	73,066	
Conservative	Hugh Farley	9,166	
Independence	Hugh Farley	4,311	
Stop Common Core	Hugh Farley	563	
Total	Hugh Farley (incumbent)	51,892	63.3
Democratic	Madelyn Thorne	25,768	
Working Families	Madelyn Thorne	4,215	
Total	Madelyn Thorne	29,983	36.6
Write-in		57	0.1
Total votes		81,932	100.0
Republican hold			

=== 2012 ===
2012 New York State Senate election, District 49
Party	Candidate	Votes	%
Republican	Hugh Farley	58,013	
Conservative	Hugh Farley	8,171	
Independence	Hugh Farley	3,677	
Total	Hugh Farley (incumbent)	69,861	60.1
Democratic	Madelyn Thorne	42,707	
Working Families	Madelyn Thorne	3,708	
Total	Madelyn Thorne	46,415	39.9
Write-in		53	0.0
Total votes		116,329	100.0
Republican hold			

=== Federal results in District 49 ===
Year	Office	Results
2020	President	Biden 50.8 – 47.0%
2016	President	Trump 48.9 – 45.3%
2012	President	Obama 51.2 – 46.9%
2012	Senate	Gillibrand 64.1 – 34.3%
