= Vivian E. Cook =

American politician in New York (b. 1937)

Vivian Cook
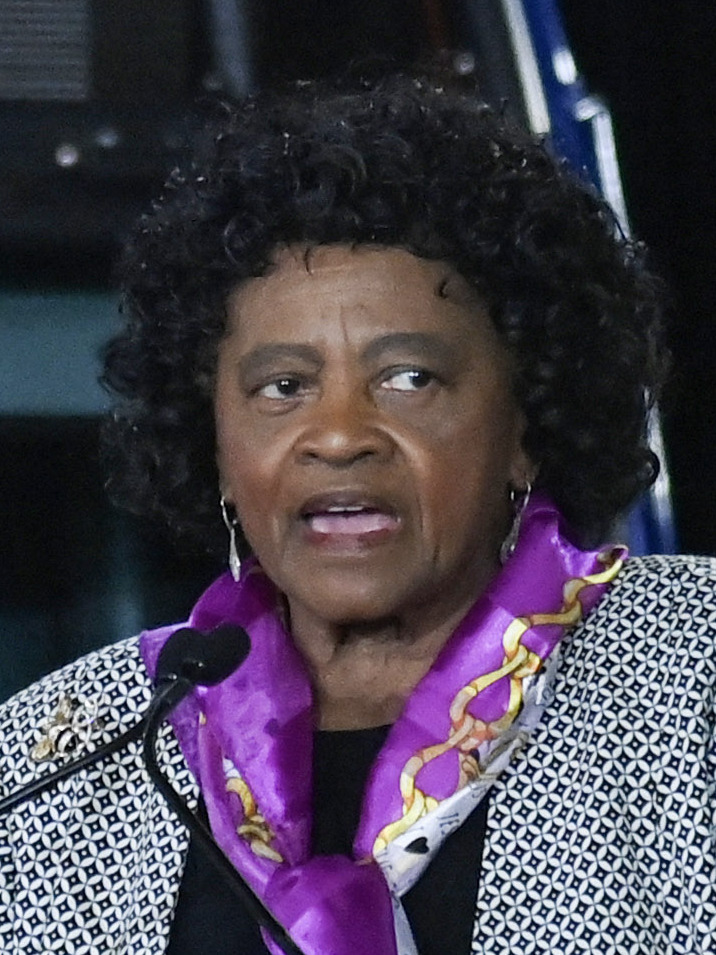
- Cook speaking in 2022

Member of the New York State Assembly from the 32nd district
- Incumbent
- Assumed office January 1, 1991
- Preceded by: Edward Abramson
- Succeeded by: Nathaniel Hezekiah III (elect)

Personal details
- Born: May 23, 1937 (age 89) Rock Hill, South Carolina, U.S.
- Party: Democratic
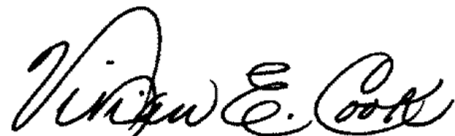
- Signature
- Website: State Assembly website

Vivian E. Cook (born May 23, 1937) is an American politician from Queens, New York. A Democrat, Cook has represented District 32 in the New York State Assembly since 1991. Assembly District 32 comprises all or portions of the neighborhoods Jamaica, Locust Manor, Richmond Hill, Rochdale Village, St. Albans and South Ozone Park in Southeast Queens.

== Life and career ==
A native of Rock Hill, South Carolina, Cook served as a district leader in Queens for over 25 years.

Cook was first elected to the State Assembly in 1990. She began representing District 32 in the Assembly in 1991. Assembly District 32 comprises all or portions of the neighborhoods Jamaica, Locust Manor, Richmond Hill, Rochdale Village, St. Albans, and South Ozone Park in Southeast Queens. Cook is the first Black woman to represent District 32.

Cook was appointed chairwoman of the Task Force on Food and the Farm and Nutrition Policy in 2000.

In 2010, the New York Daily News reported that Cook was among the Assembly members that refused to disclose her outside income.

In 2018, a former staffer sued Cook, alleging racial discrimination and alleging that Cook created a "hostile and intimidating work environment". Specifically, the plaintiff claimed that Cook "used racial slurs disparaging mixed race individuals" and "called her a 'whore' and a 'prostitute' for wearing sleeveless dresses".

As of January 2019, Cook was the County Committee Chair of the Queens County Democratic Committee.

Cook has served as chair of the Assembly Committee on Standing Committees.

Cook helped to obtain $30 million in capital funding for Rochdale Village.

On February 2, 2026, at the age of 88, Cook announced that she would not seek reelection to her Assembly seat in November.
