= Bill Magnarelli =

American politician (born 1949)

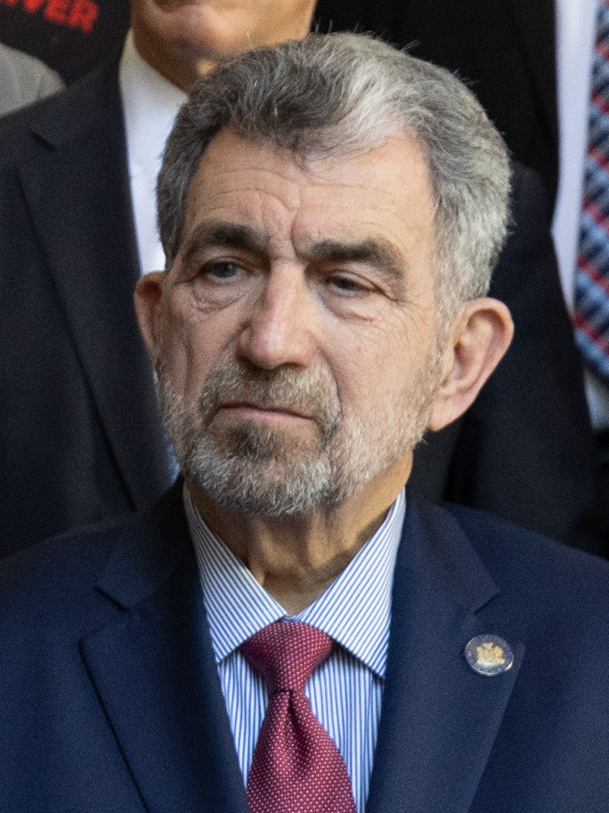

Member of the New York State Assembly from the 129th district
- Incumbent
- Assumed office January 1, 1999
- Preceded by: Bernard Mahoney

Personal details
- Born: March 20, 1949 (age 77) Syracuse, New York, U.S.
- Party: Democratic
- Spouse: Karen Magnarelli (Passed 2017)
- Domestic partner: Didi Barret
- Children: 3
- Education: Syracuse University (BS, JD)
- Website: Official website

William B. Magnarelli (born March 20, 1949) is an American politician and member of the New York State Assembly. He has represented the 129th district since 1999 as a Democrat.

Magnarelli's district includes the Northside, Westside, Eastwood and Valley areas of the City of Syracuse, as well as the towns of Geddes and Van Buren. In 1998, he won the election for an open seat.

In the 2026 Democratic primary, Magnarelli was defeated by Maurice Brown.

== Early life, education, and military service ==
Magnarelli grew up in Syracuse, attended Our Lady of Pompei School and St. John the Baptist Academy. He received his bachelor's degree from Syracuse University in 1970, majoring in history. He attended Syracuse University Law School, graduating with honors in 1973. After graduating, Bill Magnarelli served in the U.S. Army Reserve for six years, attaining the rank of captain.

== Political career ==
Magnarelli was elected to the assembly in 1998, following the retirement of Bernard Mahoney.

In 2007, Magnarelli won the Democratic nomination for Onondaga County executive. He was defeated by Republican Joanie Mahoney, earning 36% of the vote to Mahoney's 58%.

In 2026, Magnarelli was seeking a 15th term in the assembly. He was challenged by Maurice Brown, who defeated him for the Democratic nomination.

== Personal life ==
Magnarelli's wife Karen, died in 2017 from cancer. He has since formed a relationship with his assembly colleague, Didi Barrett.

New York State Assembly
Preceded by Bernard Mahoney	Member of the New York Assembly from the 129th district 1999–present	Incumbent
