= Jim Tedisco =

American politician (born 1950)

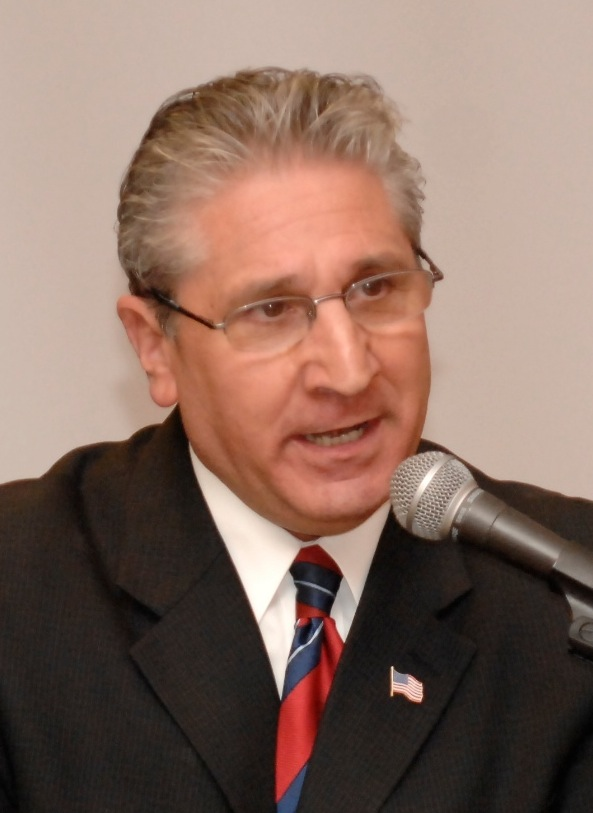

Member of the New York Senate from the 44th district
- In office January 1, 2017 – January 1, 2027
- Preceded by: Hugh Farley
- Succeeded by: Sarah Rogerson (elect)
- Constituency: 49th district (2017–2022); 44th district (2023–present)

Minority Leader of the New York State Assembly
- In office November 29, 2005 – April 3, 2009
- Preceded by: Charles H. Nesbitt
- Succeeded by: Brian Kolb

Member of the New York State Assembly
- In office January 1, 1983 – January 1, 2017
- Preceded by: Clark C. Wemple
- Succeeded by: Mary Beth Walsh
- Constituency: 107th district (1983–1993); 103rd district (1993–2003); 110th district (2003–2013); 112th district (2013–2017)

Personal details
- Born: James Nicholas Tedisco; July 15, 1950 (age 76) Schenectady, New York, U.S.
- Party: Republican
- Spouse: Mary Song
- Education: Union College
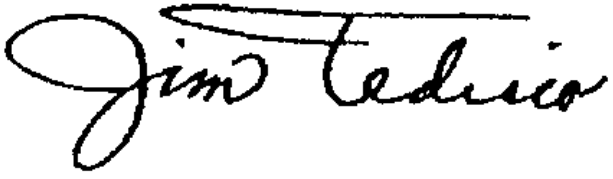
- Signature
- Website: Senate Website

James Nicholas Tedisco (born July 15, 1950) is an American politician. He became the New York State Senator for New York's 44th State Senate district in 2023.

A Republican, Tedisco served in the New York State Assembly from 1983 to 2017. He was the Assembly Minority Leader from November 2005 until his resignation from that post in April 2009. In 2009, Tedisco was the Republican nominee in a special election for the 20th US Congressional District to fill the seat vacated by Kirsten Gillibrand following Gillibrand's appointment to the United States Senate; he was defeated by Democrat Scott Murphy.

== Early life, education, early career, and family life ==
Jim Tedisco graduated from Bishop Gibbons High School in 1968, and received his B.A. in Psychology from Union College. While at Union, he played varsity basketball for three years where he set 15 scoring and assist records, and left as Union's all-time leading scorer with 1,632 points. Tedisco earned multiple athletic awards during his college career, and was inducted into the Union Athletics Hall of Fame in 2002. In 1997, he was given the Silver Anniversary Award from the NCAA.

Tedisco received a graduate degree in Special Education from the College of Saint Rose. From 1973 to 1982, Tedisco worked in education; he served as a guidance counselor, basketball coach, and athletic director at Notre Dame-Bishop Gibbons High School in Schenectady, and later worked as a special education teacher, resource room instructor and varsity basketball coach at Bethlehem Central High School in Delmar, New York.

Tedisco entered public service in 1977 when, at the age of 27, he was elected to the Schenectady City Council.

Tedisco is a resident of Glenville, New York, where he lives with his wife and stepson.

== New York State Assembly ==
=== Elections ===
In 1982, Assemblyman Clark Wemple retired from the State Assembly, leaving an opening in the district. Tedisco won a four-way race in Republican primary, and then won the general election.

Due to redistricting, Tedisco represented the 107th District from 1983 to 1993, the 103rd District from 1993 to 2003, the 110th District from 2003 to 2012, and most recently represented the 112th District since from 2012 to 2017. The 112th District consists of portions of Schenectady County and Saratoga County, including the towns of Greenfield, Providence, Milton, Galway, Ballston, Charlton, Clifton Park, Halfmoon, and Glenville.

Tedisco ran uncontested in the 2008 general election and won the 2010 general election with 64 percent of the vote.

After 44 years in office, Tedisco lost his re-election bid in 2026, 52.3%-47.7% to Democrat Sarah Rogerson.

=== Tenure ===
Tedisco introduced "Charlotte's Law" to permanently terminate driver's license privileges for drunk and dangerous drivers. While Tedisco's bill was not passed, the DMV enacted regulations similar to what was proposed in the bill.

In 1999, Tedisco worked to pass Buster's Law, which protected pets by making animal cruelty a felony, and in 2011 advocated for New York State Animal Advocacy Day.

In 2014, Tedisco sponsored a successful constitutional amendment, Proposition 2, that would replace bill printouts with digital copies of bills.

==== Assembly Minority Leader ====
Tedisco served as Assembly Minority Leader from November 2005 to April 2009.

According to The New York Times, Tedisco "clashed loudly and publicly" with Democratic Governor Eliot Spitzer. In January 2007, Spitzer reportedly told Tedisco, "'I am a fucking steamroller and I’ll roll over you or anybody else'".

Tedisco was noted for his opposition to Spitzer's September 2007 executive order directing that state offices allow undocumented immigrants to be issued driver's licenses. Tedisco threatened a lawsuit if the plan was implemented. On November 14, 2007, Spitzer announced he would withdraw the driver license plan, acknowledging that it would never be implemented.

Tedisco later accused Spitzer of cutting $300,000 of state funding for health care and education grants in the Schenectady area as retaliation for Tedisco's opposition to the Spitzer driver license plan. Tedisco accused the Governor of "dirty tricks" and "bullying".

Following reports of Spitzer's involvement in a prostitution scandal, Tedisco called for his resignation and announced that he would initiate impeachment proceedings in the State Assembly if Spitzer did not resign. Spitzer resigned his post effective March 17, 2008.

Tedisco stepped down as Minority Leader in April 2009 amid reports that other Republican Members of the Assembly were concerned about his congressional campaign distracting him from his leadership role.

== 2009 special congressional election ==
On January 23, 2009, after Governor David Paterson announced that he had selected Representative Kirsten Gillibrand to fill the United States Senate seat vacated by Hillary Clinton, Tedisco stated his intention to run for Congress to replace Gillibrand in New York's 20th Congressional District. Though not a resident of the district, Tedisco became its Republican nominee on January 27, 2009, and ran against Democrat Scott Murphy. The initial count from the election had Murphy leading by 59 votes, out of over 155,000 cast on March 31, 2009. This tally reportedly did not include any of the 10,000 requested absentee ballots, which needed only to have been postmarked by that date and could have been returned as late as April 7 (domestically) or April 13 (internationally). Eventually, about 7,000 absentee ballots were received; the vote count as of April 24 had Murphy ahead by 399 votes. On April 24, Tedisco conceded the election to Murphy.

== New York State Senate ==
In 2016, Senator Hugh Farley announced that he would not seek re-election to the Senate. Farley's retirement left an opening in the 49th State Senate District. After Tedisco handily won the Republican primary, he went on to defeat General Election opponent Chad Putman. Tedisco won the election with 69% of the vote on November 8, 2016.

Tedisco won reelection in 2018 and 2020.

In May 2022, following redistricting, Tedisco announced his intent to move into the newly constituted 44th Senate District from his 46th Senate District to challenge Republican incumbent Sen. Daphne Jordan for the seat. This action caused controversy. On June 14, 2022, Jordan announced that she would not seek re-election to the Senate. Jordan accused Tedisco of "creating a 'circus atmosphere' in the campaign", commenting: "'I want no part of this sideshow. I’m not going to play a political game that would be destructive, divisive, and undermine the principles that I care deeply about'".

== Positions ==
=== Abortion ===
Tedisco opposes abortion and only supports it in cases of rape, incest, or if a woman's life (not health) is in danger. In 2018, the Albany Times Union endorsed Tedisco for re-election to the State Senate. The Times Union stated that Tedisco had informed the paper's editorial board that he would support a proposed abortion rights bill known as the Reproductive Health Act. After Tedisco publicly contradicted this assertion and affirmed his opposition to the bill, the Times Union rescinded its endorsement. Tedisco voted against the Reproductive Health Act in January 2019.

=== Second Amendment ===
Tedisco holds a broad interpretation of the Second Amendment. He voted against the NY SAFE Act, a gun control measure that became law in 2013. He voted against a bill that prohibits individuals convicted of domestic abuse from purchasing guns. He also believes that a safety or childproof mechanism does not need to be incorporated into the design of firearms.

=== Labor and employment ===
Tedisco voted against paid family leave (February 2, 2016), equal pay regardless of gender (January 27, 2014), freelance wage protection (June 20, 2011), and the Wage Theft Prevention Act (July 1, 2010). He also repeatedly voted against an increase in the minimum wage (May 4, 2015; March 5, 2013).

=== LGBTQ ===
Tedisco repeatedly voted against bills to legalize same-sex marriage. He also voted against bills to prohibit discrimination based on gender identity. On June 16, 2014, Tedisco voted against a bill that would have prohibited sexual orientation conversion therapy on minors.

=== Marijuana ===
Tedisco opposes legalizing recreational marijuana.

New York State Assembly
Preceded by Clark C. Wemple	Member of the New York State Assembly from the 107th district 1983–1992	Succeeded by Arnold W. Proskin
Preceded by Arnold W. Proskin	Member of the New York State Assembly from the 103rd district 1993–2002	Succeeded by Patrick R. Manning
Preceded by Chris Ortloff	Member of the New York State Assembly from the 110th district 2003–2012	Succeeded by Phillip Steck
Preceded by Tony Jordan	Member of the New York State Assembly from the 112th district 2013–2016	Succeeded by Mary Beth Walsh
Preceded by Charles H. Nesbitt	Minority Leader of the New York State Assembly; 2005–2009	Succeeded by Brian Kolb
New York State Senate
Preceded by Hugh T. Farley	Member of the New York State Senate from the 49th district 2017–2022	Succeeded by Mark Walczyk
Preceded by Neil Breslin	Member of the New York State Senate from the 44th district 2023–2026	Incumbent
