= New York's 44th State Senate district =

American legislative district

Senator
Jim Tedisco; R–Glenville
- Registration: 52.5% Democratic; 16.7% Republican; 23.0% No party preference
- Demographics: 69% White; 14% Black; 7% Hispanic; 7% Asian
- Population (2017): 293,861
- Registered voters: 184,695

New York's 44th State Senate district is one of 63 districts in the New York State Senate. It has been represented by Republican Jim Tedisco since 2023.

== Geography ==
District 44 covers parts of Saratoga and Schenectady Counties.

The district is located in New York’s 20th and 21st congressional districts and overlaps with the 107th, 108th, 109th, 110th, 112th, and 113th districts of the New York State Assembly.

== Recent election results ==
=== 2026 ===
2026 New York State Senate election, District 44
Primary election
Party	Candidate	Votes	%
Democratic	Sarah Rogerson	8,746	68.4
Democratic	Patrick Nelson	4,023	31.4
Write-in		23	0.2
Total votes		12,792	100.0
General election
Republican	Jim Tedisco		
Conservative	Jim Tedisco		
Vote Affordable	Jim Tedisco		
Total	Jim Tedisco (incumbent)		
Democratic	Sarah Rogerson		
Working Families	Sarah Rogerson		
Total	Sarah Rogerson		
Write-in			
Total votes			

=== 2024 ===
2024 New York State Senate election, District 44
Party	Candidate	Votes	%
Republican	Jim Tedisco	81,103	
Conservative	Jim Tedisco	11,342	
Total	Jim Tedisco (incumbent)	92,445	57.8
Democratic	Minita Sanghvi	62,254	
Working Families	Minita Sanghvi	5,030	
Total	Minita Sanghvi	67,284	42.1
Write-in		85	0.1
Total votes		159,814	100.0
Republican hold			

=== 2022 (redistricting) ===
2022 New York State Senate election, District 44
Primary election
Party	Candidate	Votes	%
Republican	Jim Tedisco	5,296	76.9
Republican	Daphne Jordan	1,582	22.9
Write-in		11	0.2
Total votes		6,889	100.0
Conservative	Jim Tedisco	314	80.9
Conservative	Daphne Jordan	72	18.6
Write-in		2	0.5
Total votes		388	100.0
General election
Republican	Jim Tedisco	61,610	
Conservative	Jim Tedisco	9,347	
Total	Jim Tedisco	70,957	56.4
Democratic	Michelle Ostrelich	50,427	
Working Families	Michelle Ostrelich	4,424	
Total	Michelle Ostrelich	54,651	43.5
Write-in		94	0.1
Total votes		125,702	100.0
Republican win (new boundaries)			

=== 2020 ===
2020 New York State Senate election, District 44
Party	Candidate	Votes	%
Democratic	Neil Breslin	80,255	
Working Families	Neil Breslin	10,144	
Independence	Neil Breslin	2,616	
Total	Neil Breslin (incumbent)	93,015	73.0
Republican	David Yule	34,269	26.9
Write-in		155	0.1
Total votes		127,439	100.0
Democratic hold			

=== 2018 ===
2018 New York State Senate election, District 44
Party	Candidate	Votes	%
Democratic	Neil Breslin	61,880	
Working Families	Neil Breslin	4,275	
Independence	Neil Breslin	2,575	
Total	Neil Breslin (incumbent)	68,730	70.6
Republican	Christopher Davis	23,647	
Conservative	Christopher Davis	4,204	
Reform	Christopher Davis	683	
Total	Christopher Davis	28,534	29.3
Write-in		83	0.1
Total votes		97,347	100.0
Democratic hold			

=== 2016 ===
2016 New York State Senate election, District 44
Party	Candidate	Votes	%
Democratic	Neil Breslin	69,816	
Working Families	Neil Breslin	4,335	
Independence	Neil Breslin	3,670	
Total	Neil Breslin (incumbent)	77,821	68.6
Republican	Christopher Davis	27,671	
Conservative	Christopher Davis	4,468	
Reform	Christopher Davis	3,670	
Total	Christopher Davis	33,036	29.1
Green	Leyva Arthur	2,501	2.2
Write-in		98	0.1
Total votes		113,456	100.0
Democratic hold			

=== 2014 ===
2014 New York State Senate election, District 44
Party	Candidate	Votes	%
Democratic	Neil Breslin	43,893	
Working Families	Neil Breslin	6,065	
Independence	Neil Breslin	5,971	
Total	Neil Breslin (incumbent)	55,929	98.9
Write-in		619	1.1
Total votes		56,548	100.0
Democratic hold			

=== 2012 ===
2012 New York State Senate election, District 44
Primary election
Party	Candidate	Votes	%
Democratic	Neil Breslin (incumbent)	16,795	70.9
Democratic	Shawn Morse	6,905	29.1
Write-in		0	0.0
Total votes		23,700	100.0
General election
Democratic	Neil Breslin	75,168	
Working Families	Neil Breslin	5,368	
Independence	Neil Breslin	5,120	
Total	Neil Breslin (incumbent)	85,656	90.4
Green	Peter LaVenia Jr.	8,796	9.3
Write-in		248	0.3
Total votes		94,700	100.0
Democratic hold			

=== Federal results in District 44 ===
Year	Office	Results
2020	President	Biden 67.4 – 30.2%
2016	President	Clinton 62.9 – 31.8%
2012	President	Obama 67.3 – 30.6%
2012	Senate	Gillibrand 77.0 – 21.3%
