= 2006 New York State Assembly election =

- November 7, 2006

All 150 seats in the New York State Assembly 75 seats needed for a majority
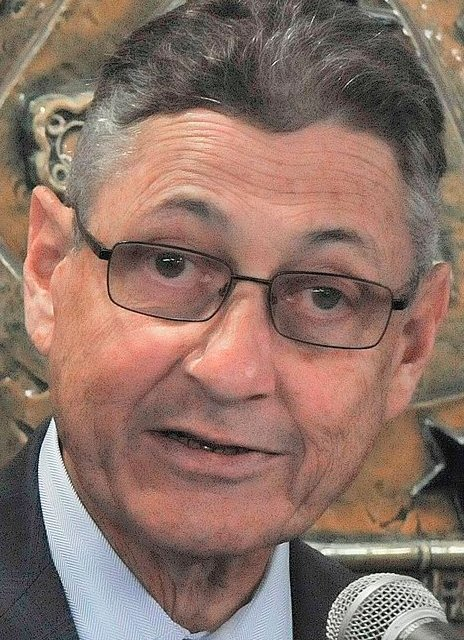

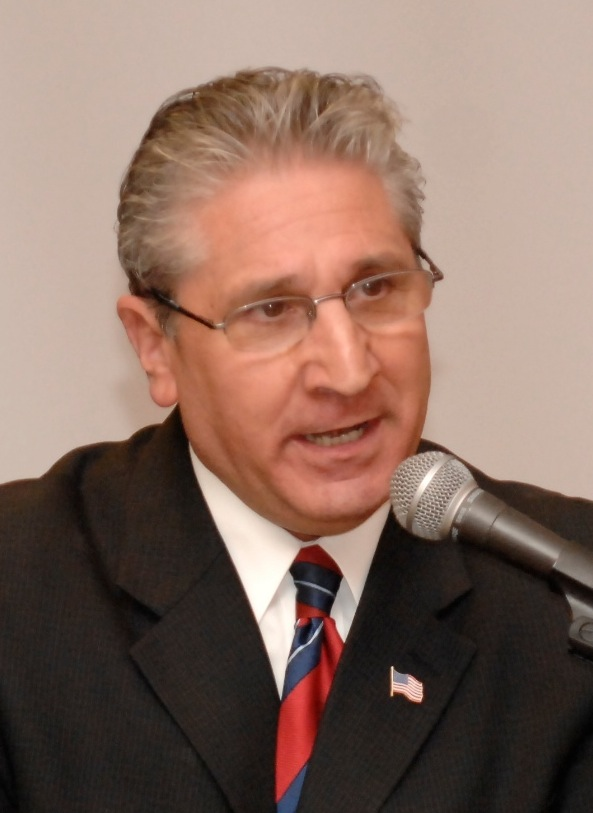
	Majority party	Minority party
Leader	Sheldon Silver	Jim Tedisco
Party	Democratic	Republican
Leader since	February 11, 1994	November 29, 2005
Leader's seat	District 64	District 110
Last election	103	47
Seats after	108 (Note: Includes a member of the Independence Party of New York and a member of the Working Families Party who caucused with the democrats.)	42
Seat change	▲5	▼5
Speaker before election
Sheldon Silver
Democratic
Elected Speaker
Sheldon Silver
Democratic

The 2006 New York State Assembly election was held on November 7, 2006, to determine which party would control the New York State Assembly for the following two years in the 197th New York State Legislature. All 150 seats in the New York State Assembly were up for election and the primary was held on September 12, 2006. Prior to the election, 103 seats were held by Democrats and 47 seats were held by Republicans. The general election saw Democrats expanding their majority in the State Assembly by 5 seats. (Note: Includes a member of the Independence Party of New York and a member of the Working Families Party who caucused with the democrats.)

== Predictions ==
Source	Ranking	As of
Governing	Safe D	November 4, 2006

== Retirements ==
=== Democrats ===
1. District 22: Jimmy Meng retired.
2. District 25: Brian M. McLaughlin retired after being charged with racketeering and embezzlement.
3. District 46: Adele Cohen retired.
4. District 57: Roger L. Green retired to unsuccessfully run for New York's 10th congressional district.
5. District 95: Ryan Karben resigned on May 18, 2006 after he became the subject of an internal investigation into alleged sexual advances toward staffers.
6. District 143: Paul Tokasz retired.

=== Republicans ===
1. District 60: Matthew Mirones retired.
2. District 108: Pat M. Casale retired.
3. District 114: Chris Ortloff retired.
4. District 121: Jeffrey Brown retired to unsuccessfully run for State Senate.
5. District 127: Daniel L. Hooker retired.

== Incumbents defeated ==
=== In primary ===
==== Democrats ====
1. District 74: Sylvia Friedman lost renomination to Brian P. Kavanagh. Friedman lost to Kavanagh again when she ran in the general election as the Working Families Party nominee.

==== Republicans ====
1. District 99: Willis Stephens lost renomination to Greg Ball.
2. District 103: Patrick R. Manning lost renomination to Marc Molinaro.

== Closest races ==
Seats where the margin of victory was under 10%:

1. District 121, 2.71% (gain)
2. District 60, 3.04% (gain)
3. District 93, 3.79%
4. District 96, 4.93%
5. District 17, 6.03%
6. District 10, 6.57%
7. District 108, 6.63% (gain)
8. District 97, 8.85%
9. District 127, 8.87%

== Results ==
=== District 1 ===
District 1 election, 2006
Party	Candidate	Votes	%
Democratic	Marc Alessi (incumbent)	24,366	56.83%
Republican	Daniel J. Panico	15,446	36.02%
	Scattering	3,067	7.15%
Total votes		42,879	100.0%
Democratic hold			

=== District 2 ===
District 2 election, 2006
Party	Candidate	Votes	%
Republican	Fred Thiele (incumbent)	20,978	56.50%
Democratic	M. Treewolf West	14,449	38.23%
	Scattering	2,368	6.27%
Total votes		37,795	100.0%
Republican hold			

=== District 3 ===
District 3 election, 2006
Party	Candidate	Votes	%
Democratic	Patricia Eddington (incumbent)	17,037	59.40%
Republican	Scott J. Salimando	9,819	34.24%
	Scattering	1,824	6.36%
Total votes		28,680	100.0%
Democratic hold			

=== District 4 ===
District 4 election, 2006
Party	Candidate	Votes	%
Democratic	Steve Englebright (incumbent)	22,442	64.93%
Republican	Bruce C. Bennett	9,970	28.85%
	Scattering	2,151	6.22%
Total votes		34,563	100.0%
Democratic hold			

=== District 5 ===
District 5 election, 2006
Party	Candidate	Votes	%
Democratic	Ginny Fields (incumbent)	18,406	53.33%
Republican	William M. Faulk Jr.	11,826	34.26%
	Scattering	4,282	12.41%
Total votes		34,514	100.0%
Democratic hold			

=== District 6 ===
District 6 election, 2006
Party	Candidate	Votes	%
Democratic	Philip Ramos (incumbent)	11,580	62.76%
	Scattering	6,871	37.24%
Total votes		18,451	100.0%
Democratic hold			

=== District 7 ===
District 7 election, 2006
Party	Candidate	Votes	%
Republican	Michael J. Fitzpatrick (incumbent)	21,211	54.34%
Democratic	Grace Kelly-McGovern	14,111	36.15%
	Scattering	3,713	9.51%
Total votes		39,035	100.0%
Republican hold			

=== District 8 ===
District 8 election, 2006
Party	Candidate	Votes	%
Republican	Phil Boyle (incumbent)	19,088	52.68%
Democratic	Dennis M. Cohen	12,261	33.83%
	Scattering	4,890	13.49%
Total votes		36,239	100.0%
Republican hold			

=== District 9 ===
District 9 election, 2006
Party	Candidate	Votes	%
Republican	Andrew Raia (incumbent)	22,039	56.30%
Democratic	Gerard J. McCreight	13,950	35.64%
	Scattering	3,154	8.06%
Total votes		39,143	100.0%
Republican hold			

=== District 10 ===
District 10 election, 2006
Party	Candidate	Votes	%
Republican	James D. Conte (incumbent)	18,881	49.68%
Democratic	Barbara A. LoMoriello	16,381	43.11%
	Scattering	2,741	7.21%
Total votes		38,003	100.0%
Republican hold			

=== District 11 ===
District 11 election, 2006
Party	Candidate	Votes	%
Democratic	Robert K. Sweeney (incumbent)	15,485	62.34%
	Scattering	8,186	32.96%
Conservative	Donald H. Nohs	1,167	4.70%
Total votes		24,838	100.0%
Democratic hold			

=== District 12 ===
District 12 election, 2006
Party	Candidate	Votes	%
Republican	Joseph Saladino (incumbent)	24,180	61.49%
Democratic	Craig S. Heller	12,046	30.63%
	Scattering	3,100	7.88%
Total votes		39,326	100.0%
Republican hold			

=== District 13 ===
District 13 election, 2006
Party	Candidate	Votes	%
Democratic	Charles D. Lavine (incumbent)	24,160	59.98%
Republican	Steve J. Gonzalez	12,600	31.28%
	Scattering	3,522	8.74%
Total votes		40,282	100.0%
Democratic hold			

=== District 14 ===
District 14 election, 2006
Party	Candidate	Votes	%
Republican	Robert Barra (incumbent)	20,938	53.17%
Democratic	Daniel A. Torres	14,417	36.61%
	Scattering	4,023	10.22%
Total votes		39,378	100.0%
Republican hold			

=== District 15 ===
District 15 election, 2006
Party	Candidate	Votes	%
Republican	Rob Walker (incumbent)	19,294	52.98%
Democratic	Matthew G. Pangburn	13,368	36.71%
	Scattering	3,756	10.31%
Total votes		36,418	100.0%
Republican hold			

=== District 16 ===
District 16 election, 2006
Party	Candidate	Votes	%
Democratic	Tom DiNapoli (incumbent)	27,296	68.53%
Republican	Louis F. Chisari	9,516	23.89%
	Scattering	3,017	7.58%
Total votes		39,829	100.0%
Democratic hold			

=== District 17 ===
District 17 election, 2006
Party	Candidate	Votes	%
Republican	Thomas McKevitt (incumbent)	19,048	47.30%
Democratic	Dolores D. Sedacca	16,622	41.27%
	Scattering	4,603	11.43%
Total votes		40,273	100.0%
Republican hold			

=== District 18 ===
District 18 election, 2006
Party	Candidate	Votes	%
Democratic	Earlene Hill Hooper (incumbent)	16,587	70.63%
Republican	J. Barrington Jackson	3,580	15.25%
	Scattering	3,316	14.12%
Total votes		23,483	100.0%
Democratic hold			

=== District 19 ===
District 19 election, 2006
Party	Candidate	Votes	%
Republican	David McDonough (incumbent)	20,681	51.00%
Democratic	Donald Birnbaum	15,627	38.54%
	Scattering	4,243	10.46%
Total votes		40,551	100.0%
Republican hold			

=== District 20 ===
District 20 election, 2006
Party	Candidate	Votes	%
Democratic	Harvey Weisenberg (incumbent)	24,480	65.02%
Republican	Francis X. McQuade	10,240	27.20%
	Scattering	2,929	7.78%
Total votes		37,649	100.0%
Democratic hold			

=== District 21 ===
District 21 election, 2006
Party	Candidate	Votes	%
Republican	Thomas Alfano (incumbent)	20,815	59.11%
Democratic	Alfred D. Cooper Sr.	11,168	31.72%
	Scattering	3,230	9.17%
Total votes		35,213	100.0%
Republican hold			

=== District 22 ===
District 22 election, 2006
Party	Candidate	Votes	%
Democratic	Ellen Young	8,211	62.06%
	Scattering	2,820	21.31%
Republican	Christopher M. Migliaccio	2,200	16.63%
Total votes		13,231	100.0%
Democratic hold			

=== District 23 ===
District 23 election, 2006
Party	Candidate	Votes	%
Democratic	Audrey Pheffer (incumbent)	14,473	66.79%
Republican	Stuart Mirsky	4,349	20.07%
	Scattering	2,846	13.14%
Total votes		21,668	100.0%
Democratic hold			

=== District 24 ===
District 24 election, 2006
Party	Candidate	Votes	%
Democratic	Mark Weprin (incumbent)	19,306	71.48%
	Scattering	7,702	28.52%
Total votes		27,008	100.0%
Democratic hold			

=== District 25 ===
District 25 election, 2006
Party	Candidate	Votes	%
Democratic	Rory Lancman	10,395	62.34%
	Scattering	3,624	21.73%
Republican	Morshed Alam	2,656	15.93%
Total votes		16,675	100.0%
Democratic hold			

=== District 26 ===
District 26 election, 2006
Party	Candidate	Votes	%
Democratic	Ann-Margaret Carrozza (incumbent)	18,503	66.53%
	Scattering	9,307	33.47%
Total votes		27,810	100.0%
Democratic hold			

=== District 27 ===
District 27 election, 2006
Party	Candidate	Votes	%
Democratic	Nettie Mayersohn (incumbent)	12,606	65.32%
	Scattering	5,923	30.69%
Conservative	Walter A. Lamp	769	3.99%
Total votes		19,298	100.0%
Democratic hold			

=== District 28 ===
District 28 election, 2006
Party	Candidate	Votes	%
Democratic	Andrew Hevesi (incumbent)	14,790	60.79%
Republican	Dolores Maddis	5,653	23.23%
	Scattering	3,889	15.98%
Total votes		24,332	100.0%
Democratic hold			

=== District 29 ===
District 29 election, 2006
Party	Candidate	Votes	%
Democratic	William Scarborough (incumbent)	15,897	75.55%
	Scattering	5,145	24.45%
Total votes		21,042	100.0%
Democratic hold			

=== District 30 ===
District 30 election, 2006
Party	Candidate	Votes	%
Democratic	Margaret Markey (incumbent)	10,504	60.01%
	Scattering	7,000	39.99%
Total votes		17,504	100.0%
Democratic hold			

=== District 31 ===
District 31 election, 2006
Party	Candidate	Votes	%
Democratic	Michele Titus (incumbent)	11,072	68.20%
	Scattering	4,125	25.41%
Independence	Michael Duvalle	1,037	6.39%
Total votes		16,234	100.0%
Democratic hold			

=== District 32 ===
District 32 election, 2006
Party	Candidate	Votes	%
Democratic	Vivian E. Cook (incumbent)	13,727	71.58%
	Scattering	5,451	28.42%
Total votes		19,178	100.0%
Democratic hold			

=== District 33 ===
District 33 election, 2006
Party	Candidate	Votes	%
Democratic	Barbara M. Clark (incumbent)	16,993	74.87%
	Scattering	5,705	25.13%
Total votes		22,698	100.0%
Democratic hold			

=== District 34 ===
District 34 election, 2006
Party	Candidate	Votes	%
Democratic	Ivan C. Lafayette (incumbent)	9,772	67.65%
	Scattering	4,672	32.35%
Total votes		14,444	100.0%
Democratic hold			

=== District 35 ===
District 35 election, 2006
Party	Candidate	Votes	%
Democratic	Jeffrion L. Aubry (incumbent)	8,597	63.78%
	Scattering	4,882	36.22%
Total votes		13,479	100.0%
Democratic hold			

=== District 36 ===
District 36 election, 2006
Party	Candidate	Votes	%
Democratic	Michael Gianaris (incumbent)	12,575	71.94%
	Scattering	4,904	28.06%
Total votes		17,479	100.0%
Democratic hold			

=== District 37 ===
District 37 election, 2006
Party	Candidate	Votes	%
Democratic	Catherine Nolan (incumbent)	10,102	68.72%
	Scattering	4,598	31.28%
Total votes		14,700	100.0%
Democratic hold			

=== District 38 ===
District 38 election, 2006
Party	Candidate	Votes	%
Democratic	Anthony S. Seminerio (incumbent)	10,849	80.17%
	Scattering	2,683	19.83%
Total votes		13,532	100.0%
Democratic hold			

=== District 39 ===
District 39 election, 2006
Party	Candidate	Votes	%
Democratic	Jose Peralta (incumbent)	7,081	68.55%
	Scattering	3,248	31.45%
Total votes		10,329	100.0%
Democratic hold			

=== District 40 ===
District 40 election, 2006
Party	Candidate	Votes	%
Democratic	Diane Gordon (incumbent)	12,316	65.98%
	Scattering	5,584	29.91%
Republican	Godfrey Jelks	767	4.11%
Total votes		18,667	100.0%
Democratic hold			

=== District 41 ===
District 41 election, 2006
Party	Candidate	Votes	%
Democratic	Helene Weinstein (incumbent)	15,038	72.00%
	Scattering	3,706	17.00%
Republican	Jack Benton	1,967	9.00%
Conservative	Jonathan Testaverde	461	2.00%
Total votes		21,172	100.0%
Democratic hold			

=== District 42 ===
District 42 election, 2006
Party	Candidate	Votes	%
Democratic	Rhoda S. Jacobs (incumbent)	11,073	66.99%
	Scattering	4,758	28.79%
Republican	Harriet Katz	697	4.22%
Total votes		16,528	100.0%
Democratic hold			

=== District 43 ===
District 43 election, 2006
Party	Candidate	Votes	%
Democratic	Karim Camara (incumbent)	11,873	62.83%
	Scattering	6,041	31.97%
Republican	Kenneth E. Cook	983	5.20%
Total votes		18,897	100.0%
Democratic hold			

=== District 44 ===
District 44 election, 2006
Party	Candidate	Votes	%
Democratic	James F. Brennan (incumbent)	16,169	72.08%
	Scattering	3,626	16.17%
Republican	Yvette Valezquez Bennett	2,635	11.75%
Total votes		22,430	100.0%
Democratic hold			

=== District 45 ===
District 45 election, 2006
Party	Candidate	Votes	%
Democratic	Steven Cymbrowitz (incumbent)	12,367	83.83%
	Scattering	2,385	16.17%
Total votes		14,752	100.0%
Democratic hold			

=== District 46 ===
District 46 election, 2006
Party	Candidate	Votes	%
Democratic	Alec Brook-Krasny	11,129	56.96%
Republican	Patricia B. Laudano	4,738	24.25%
	Scattering	3,670	18.79%
Total votes		19,537	100.0%
Democratic hold			

=== District 47 ===
District 47 election, 2006
Party	Candidate	Votes	%
Democratic	William Colton (incumbent)	9,168	68.53%
Republican	Phyllis Carbo	2,509	18.76%
	Scattering	1,700	12.71%
Total votes		13,377	100.0%
Democratic hold			

=== District 48 ===
District 48 election, 2006
Party	Candidate	Votes	%
Democratic	Dov Hikind (incumbent)	9,642	75.34%
	Scattering	2,367	18.50%
Conservative	Herbert F. Ryan	788	6.16%
Total votes		12,797	100.0%
Democratic hold			

=== District 49 ===
District 49 election, 2006
Party	Candidate	Votes	%
Democratic	Peter J. Abbate Jr. (incumbent)	7,884	65.85%
Republican	Lucretia Regina-Potter	2,737	22.86%
	Scattering	1,351	11.29%
Total votes		11,972	100.0%
Democratic hold			

=== District 50 ===
District 50 election, 2006
Party	Candidate	Votes	%
Democratic	Joe Lentol (incumbent)	11,148	69.98%
	Scattering	3,454	21.69%
Republican	Richard Trainer	1,326	8.33%
Total votes		15,928	100.0%
Democratic hold			

=== District 51 ===
District 51 election, 2006
Party	Candidate	Votes	%
Democratic	Félix W. Ortiz (incumbent)	7,431	66.12%
	Scattering	2,625	23.35%
Republican	Washington G. Artus	1,184	10.53%
Total votes		11,240	100.0%
Democratic hold			

=== District 52 ===
District 52 election, 2006
Party	Candidate	Votes	%
Democratic	Joan Millman (incumbent)	30,070	81.97%
	Scattering	4,176	11.38%
Republican	Rosemarie Markgraf	2,438	6.65%
Total votes		36,684	100.0%
Democratic hold			

=== District 53 ===
District 53 election, 2006
Party	Candidate	Votes	%
Democratic	Vito Lopez (incumbent)	12,194	75.63%
	Scattering	3,144	19.50%
Republican	Ameriar Feliciano	785	4.87%
Total votes		16,123	100.0%
Democratic hold			

=== District 54 ===
District 54 election, 2006
Party	Candidate	Votes	%
Democratic	Darryl C. Towns (incumbent)	8,192	66.91%
	Scattering	3,548	28.98%
Republican	Khorshed A. Chowdhury	503	4.11%
Total votes		12,243	100.0%
Democratic hold			

=== District 55 ===
District 55 election, 2006
Party	Candidate	Votes	%
Democratic	William Boyland Jr. (incumbent)	10,505	68.94%
	Scattering	4,292	28.17%
Republican	Rose Laney	440	2.89%
Total votes		15,237	100.0%
Democratic hold			

=== District 56 ===
District 56 election, 2006
Party	Candidate	Votes	%
Democratic	Annette Robinson (incumbent)	12,785	73.24%
	Scattering	4,671	26.76%
Total votes		17,456	100.0%
Democratic hold			

=== District 57 ===
District 57 election, 2006
Party	Candidate	Votes	%
Democratic	Hakeem Jeffries	19,551	79.31%
	Scattering	4,485	18.20%
Republican	Henry P. Weinstein	613	2.49%
Total votes		24,649	100.0%
Democratic hold			

=== District 58 ===
District 58 election, 2006
Party	Candidate	Votes	%
Democratic	Nick Perry (incumbent)	14,691	74.87%
	Scattering	4,714	24.03%
Conservative	Robert Gaffney	215	1.10%
Total votes		19,620	100.0%
Democratic hold			

=== District 59 ===
District 59 election, 2006
Party	Candidate	Votes	%
Democratic	Alan Maisel (incumbent)	12,427	61.84%
	Scattering	6,800	33.83%
Conservative	Stephen Walters	871	4.33%
Total votes		20,098	100.0%
Democratic hold			

=== District 60 ===
District 60 election, 2006
Party	Candidate	Votes	%
Democratic	Janele Hyer-Spencer	11,352	46.20%
Republican	Anthony C. Xanthakis	10,605	43.16%
	Scattering	2,615	10.64%
Total votes		24,572	100.0%
Democratic gain from Republican			

=== District 61 ===
District 61 election, 2006
Party	Candidate	Votes	%
Democratic	John W. Lavelle (incumbent)	13,963	60.42%
Republican	Rose Margarella	5,249	22.71%
	Scattering	3,900	16.87%
Total votes		23,112	100.0%
Democratic hold			

=== District 62 ===
District 62 election, 2006
Party	Candidate	Votes	%
Republican	Vincent M. Ignizio (incumbent)	16,131	63.67%
	Scattering	9,205	36.33%
Total votes		25,336	100.0%
Republican hold			

=== District 63 ===
District 63 election, 2006
Party	Candidate	Votes	%
Democratic	Michael Cusick (incumbent)	13,086	60.27%
Republican	Victor A. Grossman	5,775	26.60%
	Scattering	2,851	13.13%
Total votes		21,712	100.0%
Democratic hold			

=== District 64 ===
District 64 election, 2006
Party	Candidate	Votes	%
Democratic	Sheldon Silver (incumbent)	17,786	74.75%
	Scattering	3,251	13.66%
Republican	Michael A. Imperiale	2,758	11.59%
Total votes		23,795	100.0%
Democratic hold			

=== District 65 ===
District 65 election, 2006
Party	Candidate	Votes	%
Democratic	Pete Grannis (incumbent)	25,334	73.34%
Republican	Michael Fandal	5,499	15.92%
	Scattering	3,710	10.74%
Total votes		34,543	100.0%
Democratic hold			

=== District 66 ===
District 66 election, 2006
Party	Candidate	Votes	%
Democratic	Deborah J. Glick (incumbent)	33,667	85.17%
	Scattering	5,860	14.83%
Total votes		39,527	100.0%
Democratic hold			

=== District 67 ===
District 67 election, 2006
Party	Candidate	Votes	%
Democratic	Linda Rosenthal (incumbent)	33,909	79.66%
Republican	Theodore Howard	4,469	10.50%
	Scattering	4,186	9.84%
Total votes		42,564	100.0%
Democratic hold			

=== District 68 ===
District 68 election, 2006
Party	Candidate	Votes	%
Democratic	Adam Clayton Powell IV (incumbent)	15,629	72.52%
	Scattering	4,337	20.12%
Republican	Dean Loren Velasco	1,587	7.36%
Total votes		21,553	100.0%
Democratic hold			

=== District 69 ===
District 69 election, 2006
Party	Candidate	Votes	%
Democratic	Daniel J. O'Donnell (incumbent)	27,890	74.59%
	Scattering	9,499	25.41%
Total votes		37,389	100.0%
Democratic hold			

=== District 70 ===
District 70 election, 2006
Party	Candidate	Votes	%
Democratic	Keith L. T. Wright (incumbent)	19,633	79.69%
	Scattering	5,005	20.31%
Total votes		24,638	100.0%
Democratic hold			

=== District 71 ===
District 71 election, 2006
Party	Candidate	Votes	%
Democratic	Herman D. Farrell Jr. (incumbent)	18,826	73.46%
	Scattering	5,423	21.16%
Republican	Glenda Allen	1,378	5.38%
Total votes		25,627	100.0%
Democratic hold			

=== District 72 ===
District 72 election, 2006
Party	Candidate	Votes	%
Democratic	Adriano Espaillat (incumbent)	14,176	76.44%
	Scattering	3,261	17.58%
Republican	Martin Chicon	1,109	5.98%
Total votes		18,546	100.0%
Democratic hold			

=== District 73 ===
District 73 election, 2006
Party	Candidate	Votes	%
Democratic	Jonathan Bing (incumbent)	26,920	68.47%
Republican	Robert Heim	8,062	20.50%
	Scattering	4,337	11.03%
Total votes		39,319	100.0%
Democratic hold			

=== District 74 ===
District 74 election, 2006
Party	Candidate	Votes	%
Democratic	Brian P. Kavanagh	21,875	64.59%
	Scattering	4,561	13.47%
Working Families	Sylvia Friedman (incumbent)	3,855	11.38%
Republican	Frank J. Scala	3,576	10.56%
Total votes		33,867	100.0%
Democratic hold			

=== District 75 ===
District 75 election, 2006
Party	Candidate	Votes	%
Democratic	Richard N. Gottfried (incumbent)	29,190	78.98%
	Scattering	7,770	21.02%
Total votes		36,960	100.0%
Democratic hold			

=== District 76 ===
District 76 election, 2006
Party	Candidate	Votes	%
Democratic	Peter M. Rivera (incumbent)	12,679	70.55%
	Scattering	4,160	23.15%
Republican	Steven Stern	1,132	6.30%
Total votes		17,971	100.0%
Democratic hold			

=== District 77 ===
District 77 election, 2006
Party	Candidate	Votes	%
Democratic	Aurelia Greene (incumbent)	10,092	73.56%
	Scattering	3,089	22.51%
Republican	Kathleen Benjamin Larkins	369	2.69%
Conservative	Anthony Curry	170	1.24%
Total votes		13,720	100.0%
Democratic hold			

=== District 78 ===
District 78 election, 2006
Party	Candidate	Votes	%
Democratic	Jose Rivera (incumbent)	8,421	69.33%
	Scattering	2,755	22.68%
Republican	William J. Sullivan	970	7.99%
Total votes		12,146	100.0%
Democratic hold			

=== District 79 ===
District 79 election, 2006
Party	Candidate	Votes	%
Democratic	Michael Benjamin (incumbent)	10,704	68.27%
	Scattering	4,423	28.21%
Republican	Sharon L. Grady	551	3.52%
Total votes		15,678	100.0%
Democratic hold			

=== District 80 ===
District 80 election, 2006
Party	Candidate	Votes	%
Democratic	Naomi Rivera (incumbent)	10,542	59.30%
	Scattering	3,638	20.47%
Republican	Frank Olivo	2,532	14.25%
Conservative	Joseph A. Thompson	1,062	5.98%
Total votes		17,774	100.0%
Democratic hold			

=== District 81 ===
District 81 election, 2006
Party	Candidate	Votes	%
Democratic	Jeffrey Dinowitz (incumbent)	17,539	73.19%
	Scattering	5,517	23.02%
Conservative	Steve Bradian	908	3.79%
Total votes		23,964	100.0%
Democratic hold			

=== District 82 ===
District 82 election, 2006
Party	Candidate	Votes	%
Democratic	Michael Benedetto (incumbent)	16,632	65.49%
	Scattering	4,969	19.57%
Republican	Raymond Capone	3,795	14.94%
Total votes		25,396	100.0%
Democratic hold			

=== District 83 ===
District 83 election, 2006
Party	Candidate	Votes	%
Democratic	Carl Heastie (incumbent)	14,113	75.04%
	Scattering	3,807	20.24%
Republican	Willie Bowman	741	3.94%
Green	Trevor Archer	146	0.78%
Total votes		18,807	100.0%
Democratic hold			

=== District 84 ===
District 84 election, 2006
Party	Candidate	Votes	%
Democratic	Carmen E. Arroyo (incumbent)	9,992	67.23%
	Scattering	4,089	27.51%
Republican	David Rosado	647	4.35%
Conservative	Harry Almodovar	135	0.91%
Total votes		14,863	100.0%
Democratic hold			

=== District 85 ===
District 85 election, 2006
Party	Candidate	Votes	%
Democratic	Rubén Díaz Jr. (incumbent)	10,195	70.69%
	Scattering	3,673	25.47%
Republican	William J. McDonagh	554	3.84%
Total votes		14,422	100.0%
Democratic hold			

=== District 86 ===
District 86 election, 2006
Party	Candidate	Votes	%
Democratic	Luis Diaz (incumbent)	7,810	67.08%
	Scattering	3,383	29.06%
Republican	Sham Ninah	449	3.86%
Total votes		11,642	100.0%
Democratic hold			

=== District 87 ===
District 87 election, 2006
Party	Candidate	Votes	%
Democratic	J. Gary Pretlow (incumbent)	16,244	67.18%
	Scattering	4,365	18.05%
Republican	Barbara Snyder	3,571	14.77%
Total votes		24,180	100.0%
Democratic hold			

=== District 88 ===
District 88 election, 2006
Party	Candidate	Votes	%
Democratic	Amy Paulin (incumbent)	25,063	65.32%
Republican	Jim Coleman	9,544	24.88%
	Scattering	3,761	9.80%
Total votes		38,368	100.0%
Democratic hold			

=== District 89 ===
District 89 election, 2006
Party	Candidate	Votes	%
Democratic	Adam Bradley (incumbent)	27,915	63.13%
	Scattering	16,306	36.87%
Total votes		44,221	100.0%
Democratic hold			

=== District 90 ===
District 90 election, 2006
Party	Candidate	Votes	%
Democratic	Sandy Galef (incumbent)	26,028	61.89%
	Scattering	16,027	38.11%
Total votes		42,055	100.0%
Democratic hold			

=== District 91 ===
District 91 election, 2006
Party	Candidate	Votes	%
Democratic	George Latimer (incumbent)	21,830	66.38%
	Scattering	11,054	33.62%
Total votes		32,884	100.0%
Democratic hold			

=== District 92 ===
District 92 election, 2006
Party	Candidate	Votes	%
Democratic	Richard Brodsky (incumbent)	30,023	64.91%
	Scattering	14,364	31.05%
Conservative	Gerard R. Gershonowitz	1,870	4.04%
Total votes		46,257	100.0%
Democratic hold			

=== District 93 ===
District 93 election, 2006
Party	Candidate	Votes	%
Republican	Mike Spano (incumbent)	17,472	47.94%
Democratic	Shelley B. Mayer	16,088	44.15%
	Scattering	2,882	7.91%
Total votes		36,442	100.0%
Republican hold			

=== District 94 ===
District 94 election, 2006
Party	Candidate	Votes	%
Democratic	Kenneth Zebrowski (incumbent)	23,440	59.98%
	Scattering	14,248	36.46%
Right to Life	Peter H. Partridge	1,390	3.56%
Total votes		39,078	100.0%
Democratic hold			

=== District 95 ===
District 95 election, 2006
Party	Candidate	Votes	%
Democratic	Ellen Jaffee	18,778	53.78%
Republican	Joseph P. Brennan	11,910	34.11%
	Scattering	4,227	12.11%
Total votes		34,915	100.0%
Democratic hold			

=== District 96 ===
District 96 election, 2006
Party	Candidate	Votes	%
Republican	Nancy Calhoun (incumbent)	18,942	48.92%
Democratic	Richard Randazzo	17,033	43.99%
	Scattering	2,744	7.09%
Total votes		38,719	100.0%
Republican hold			

=== District 97 ===
District 97 election, 2006
Party	Candidate	Votes	%
Republican	Ann Rabbitt (incumbent)	19,834	50.89%
Democratic	Michael D. Paduch	16,385	42.04%
	Scattering	2,755	7.07%
Total votes		38,974	100.0%
Republican hold			

=== District 98 ===
District 98 election, 2006
Party	Candidate	Votes	%
Democratic	Aileen Gunther (incumbent)	22,625	65.24%
	Scattering	12,056	34.76%
Total votes		34,681	100.0%
Democratic hold			

=== District 99 ===
District 99 election, 2006
Party	Candidate	Votes	%
Republican	Greg Ball	20,956	46.17%
Democratic	Kenneth P. Harper	17,155	37.80%
	Scattering	4,050	8.92%
Independence	Willis H. Stephens, Jr.	3,228	7.11%
Total votes		45,389	100.0%
Republican hold			

=== District 100 ===
District 100 election, 2006
Party	Candidate	Votes	%
Republican	Thomas J. Kirwan (incumbent)	15,228	50.33%
Democratic	Eleanor Thompson	12,096	39.97%
	Scattering	2,936	9.70%
Total votes		30,260	100.0%
Republican hold			

=== District 101 ===
District 101 election, 2006
Party	Candidate	Votes	%
Democratic	Kevin Cahill (incumbent)	30,379	64.81%
	Scattering	16,492	35.19%
Total votes		46,871	100.0%
Democratic hold			

=== District 102 ===
District 102 election, 2006
Party	Candidate	Votes	%
Republican	Joel M. Miller (incumbent)	19,365	48.88%
Democratic	Joel C. Tyner	14,968	37.79%
	Scattering	3,224	8.14%
Conservative	Helen Westover	2,055	5.19%
Total votes		39,612	100.0%
Republican hold			

=== District 103 ===
District 103 election, 2006
Party	Candidate	Votes	%
Republican	Marc Molinaro	22,065	50.80%
Democratic	Virginia S. Martin	17,531	40.36%
	Scattering	3,839	8.84%
Total votes		43,435	100.0%
Republican hold			

=== District 104 ===
District 104 election, 2006
Party	Candidate	Votes	%
Democratic	John McEneny (incumbent)	36,806	77.72%
	Scattering	10,550	22.28%
Total votes		47,356	100.0%
Democratic hold			

=== District 105 ===
District 105 election, 2006
Party	Candidate	Votes	%
Democratic	Paul Tonko (incumbent)	28,243	70.12%
Republican	John R. Mertz	9,389	23.31%
	Scattering	2,645	6.57%
Total votes		40,277	100.0%
Democratic hold			

=== District 106 ===
District 106 election, 2006
Party	Candidate	Votes	%
Democratic	Ronald Canestrari (incumbent)	25,669	65.38%
Republican	Kandi S. Terry	9,317	23.73%
	Scattering	3,593	9.15%
Working Families	Christopher N. Consuello	679	1.73%
Total votes		39,258	100.0%
Democratic hold			

=== District 107 ===
District 107 election, 2006
Party	Candidate	Votes	%
Republican	Clifford W. Crouch (incumbent)	22,420	52.66%
Democratic	Kelly Keck	15,001	35.24%
	Scattering	5,150	12.10%
Total votes		42,571	100.0%
Republican hold			

=== District 108 ===
District 108 election, 2006
Party	Candidate	Votes	%
Independence	Timothy P. Gordon (Note: Caucused with the Assembly's Democratic majority.)	26,245	47.07%
Republican	Martin T. Reid	22,545	40.44%
	Scattering	4,959	8.90%
Working Families	Keith A. Hammond	2,001	3.59%
Total votes		55,750	100.0%
Independence gain from Republican			

=== District 109 ===
District 109 election, 2006
Party	Candidate	Votes	%
Democratic	Robert Reilly (incumbent)	33,131	58.53%
Republican	Paulette M. Barlette	19,731	34.86%
	Scattering	3,744	6.61%
Total votes		56,606	100.0%
Democratic hold			

=== District 110 ===
District 110 election, 2006
Party	Candidate	Votes	%
Republican	Jim Tedisco (incumbent)	32,853	60.03%
Democratic	Michael C. Eidens	18,671	34.01%
	Scattering	3,269	5.96%
Total votes		54,893	100.0%
Republican hold			

=== District 111 ===
District 111 election, 2006
Party	Candidate	Votes	%
Democratic	William Magee (incumbent)	23,872	58.50%
	Scattering	16,932	41.50%
Total votes		40,804	100.0%
Democratic hold			

=== District 112 ===
District 112 election, 2006
Party	Candidate	Votes	%
Republican	Roy J. McDonald (incumbent)	26,619	56.13%
Democratic	David J. Carter	14,874	31.37%
	Scattering	5,928	12.50%
Total votes		47,421	100.0%
Republican hold			

=== District 113 ===
District 113 election, 2006
Party	Candidate	Votes	%
Republican	Teresa Sayward (incumbent)	33,787	68.43%
	Scattering	15,587	31.57%
Total votes		49,374	100.0%
Republican hold			

=== District 114 ===
District 114 election, 2006
Party	Candidate	Votes	%
Republican	Janet Duprey	20,093	52.74%
Democratic	Andrew D. Brockway	15,495	40.67%
	Scattering	2,510	6.59%
Total votes		38,098	100.0%
Republican hold			

=== District 115 ===
District 115 election, 2006
Party	Candidate	Votes	%
Republican	David R. Townsend Jr. (incumbent)	27,233	60.97%
Democratic	David J. Gordon	12,986	29.07%
	Scattering	4,449	9.96%
Total votes		44,668	100.0%
Republican hold			

=== District 116 ===
District 116 election, 2006
Party	Candidate	Votes	%
Democratic	RoAnn Destito (incumbent)	21,319	58.36%
	Scattering	15,209	41.64%
Total votes		36,528	100.0%
Democratic hold			

=== District 117 ===
District 117 election, 2006
Party	Candidate	Votes	%
Republican	Marc W. Butler (incumbent)	25,980	66.00%
	Scattering	13,382	34.00%
Total votes		39,362	100.0%
Republican hold			

=== District 118 ===
District 118 election, 2006
Party	Candidate	Votes	%
Democratic	Darrel Aubertine (incumbent)	22,114	65.51%
	Scattering	11,643	34.49%
Total votes		33,757	100.0%
Democratic hold			

=== District 119 ===
District 119 election, 2006
Party	Candidate	Votes	%
Democratic	Joan Christensen (incumbent)	28,095	67.38%
Republican	Jacques Zenner	10,153	24.35%
	Scattering	3,450	8.27%
Total votes		41,698	100.0%
Democratic hold			

=== District 120 ===
District 120 election, 2006
Party	Candidate	Votes	%
Democratic	Bill Magnarelli (incumbent)	22,953	64.03%
	Scattering	12,892	35.97%
Total votes		35,845	100.0%
Democratic hold			

=== District 121 ===
District 121 election, 2006
Party	Candidate	Votes	%
Democratic	Albert A. Stirpe Jr.	23,914	47.92%
Republican	William H. Meyer Jr.	22,562	45.21%
	Scattering	3,428	6.87%
Total votes		49,904	100.0%
Democratic gain from Republican			

=== District 122 ===
District 122 election, 2006
Party	Candidate	Votes	%
Republican	Dede Scozzafava (incumbent)	18,351	57.99%
Democratic	Karl R. Williams	9,742	30.78%
	Scattering	3,553	11.23%
Total votes		31,646	100.0%
Republican hold			

=== District 123 ===
District 123 election, 2006
Party	Candidate	Votes	%
Republican	Gary Finch (incumbent)	21,683	51.93%
Democratic	Barbara Abbott King	14,809	35.46%
	Scattering	5,266	12.61%
Total votes		41,758	100.0%
Republican hold			

=== District 124 ===
District 124 election, 2006
Party	Candidate	Votes	%
Republican	William A. Barclay (incumbent)	22,855	51.41%
Democratic	J. Edward Putnam	18,286	41.14%
	Scattering	3,310	7.45%
Total votes		44,451	100.0%
Republican hold			

=== District 125 ===
District 125 election, 2006
Party	Candidate	Votes	%
Democratic	Barbara Lifton (incumbent)	24,066	61.66%
Republican	Jim R. Rohan	11,654	29.86%
	Scattering	3,308	8.48%
Total votes		39,028	100.0%
Democratic hold			

=== District 126 ===
District 126 election, 2006
Party	Candidate	Votes	%
Democratic	Donna Lupardo (incumbent)	25,714	62.49%
Republican	Jay J. Dinga	13,626	33.12%
	Scattering	1,804	4.39%
Total votes		41,144	100.0%
Democratic hold			

=== District 127 ===
District 127 election, 2006
Party	Candidate	Votes	%
Republican	Pete Lopez	22,215	49.00%
Democratic	W. Scott Trees	18,194	40.13%
	Scattering	4,929	10.87%
Total votes		45,338	100.0%
Republican hold			

=== District 128 ===
District 128 election, 2006
Party	Candidate	Votes	%
Republican	Bob Oaks (incumbent)	24,096	65.40%
	Scattering	12,746	34.60%
Total votes		36,842	100.0%
Republican hold			

=== District 129 ===
District 129 election, 2006
Party	Candidate	Votes	%
Republican	Brian Kolb (incumbent)	25,805	59.08%
	Scattering	17,876	40.92%
Total votes		43,681	100.0%
Republican hold			

=== District 130 ===
District 130 election, 2006
Party	Candidate	Votes	%
Republican	Joseph Errigo (incumbent)	25,507	53.43%
Democratic	Daniel C. West	18,501	38.76%
	Scattering	3,727	7.81%
Total votes		47,735	100.0%
Republican hold			

=== District 131 ===
District 131 election, 2006
Party	Candidate	Votes	%
Democratic	Susan V. John (incumbent)	18,000	54.38%
Republican	John J. Ferlicca	12,817	38.72%
	Scattering	2,282	6.90%
Total votes		33,099	100.0%
Democratic hold			

=== District 132 ===
District 132 election, 2006
Party	Candidate	Votes	%
Democratic	Joseph Morelle (incumbent)	29,036	63.85%
Republican	Samuel R. Trapani	13,344	29.34%
	Scattering	3,099	6.81%
Total votes		45,479	100.0%
Democratic hold			

=== District 133 ===
District 133 election, 2006
Party	Candidate	Votes	%
Democratic	David F. Gantt (incumbent)	14,791	62.67%
Republican	Carlos Q. Coker	4,563	19.33%
	Scattering	4,249	18.00%
Total votes		23,603	100.0%
Democratic hold			

=== District 134 ===
District 134 election, 2006
Party	Candidate	Votes	%
Republican	Bill Reilich (incumbent)	25,017	57.77%
Democratic	Philip A. Fedele	13,541	31.27%
	Scattering	4,747	10.96%
Total votes		43,305	100.0%
Republican hold			

=== District 135 ===
District 135 election, 2006
Party	Candidate	Votes	%
Democratic	David Koon (incumbent)	31,029	58.80%
Republican	Mark C. Johns	19,285	36.55%
	Scattering	2,453	4.65%
Total votes		52,767	100.0%
Democratic hold			

=== District 136 ===
District 136 election, 2006
Party	Candidate	Votes	%
Republican	James Bacalles (incumbent)	25,559	67.66%
	Scattering	12,215	32.34%
Total votes		37,774	100.0%
Republican hold			

=== District 137 ===
District 137 election, 2006
Party	Candidate	Votes	%
Republican	Tom O'Mara (incumbent)	23,372	60.82%
	Scattering	15,053	39.18%
Total votes		38,425	100.0%
Republican hold			

=== District 138 ===
District 138 election, 2006
Party	Candidate	Votes	%
Democratic	Francine DelMonte (incumbent)	19,788	53.06%
Republican	Daniel J. Bazzani	12,835	34.42%
Independence	Gary D. Parenti	2,795	7.50%
	Scattering	1,872	5.02%
Total votes		37,290	100.0%
Democratic hold			

=== District 139 ===
District 139 election, 2006
Party	Candidate	Votes	%
Republican	Stephen Hawley (incumbent)	23,503	60.80%
Democratic	Gary F. Kent	12,096	31.30%
	Scattering	3,053	7.90%
Total votes		38,652	100.0%
Republican hold			

=== District 140 ===
District 140 election, 2006
Party	Candidate	Votes	%
Democratic	Robin Schimminger (incumbent)	27,970	67.26%
Republican	Catherine G. Schwandt	10,175	24.47%
	Scattering	3,437	8.27%
Total votes		41,582	100.0%
Democratic hold			

=== District 141 ===
District 141 election, 2006
Party	Candidate	Votes	%
Democratic	Crystal Peoples-Stokes (incumbent)	19,340	76.09%
	Scattering	6,047	23.91%
Total votes		25,293	100.0%
Democratic hold			

=== District 142 ===
District 142 election, 2006
Party	Candidate	Votes	%
Republican	Mike Cole (incumbent)	25,035	52.58%
Democratic	Laura Monte	19,917	41.84%
	Scattering	2,655	5.58%
Total votes		47,607	100.0%
Republican hold			

=== District 143 ===
District 143 election, 2006
Party	Candidate	Votes	%
Democratic	Dennis Gabryszak	26,528	63.06%
Republican	Jeffrey N. Sell	11,261	26.77%
	Scattering	4,277	10.17%
Total votes		42,066	100.0%
Democratic hold			

=== District 144 ===
District 144 election, 2006
Party	Candidate	Votes	%
Democratic	Sam Hoyt (incumbent)	21,685	69.78%
Republican	Rus Thompson	6,852	22.05%
	Scattering	2,538	8.17%
Total votes		31,075	100.0%
Democratic hold			

=== District 145 ===
District 145 election, 2006
Party	Candidate	Votes	%
Democratic	Mark J. F. Schroeder (incumbent)	29,495	69.77%
Republican	Richard E. Zajac	8,389	19.85%
	Scattering	4,386	10.38%
Total votes		42,270	100.0%
Democratic hold			

=== District 146 ===
District 146 election, 2006
Party	Candidate	Votes	%
Republican	Jack Quinn III (incumbent)	27,174	62.64%
Democratic	Maximillian G. Tresmond	13,469	31.05%
	Scattering	2,735	6.31%
Total votes		43,378	100.0%
Republican hold			

=== District 147 ===
District 147 election, 2006
Party	Candidate	Votes	%
Republican	Daniel Burling (incumbent)	23,227	60.61%
Democratic	Judith A. Hunter	11,606	30.29%
	Scattering	3,489	9.10%
Total votes		38,322	100.0%
Republican hold			

=== District 148 ===
District 148 election, 2006
Party	Candidate	Votes	%
Republican	James P. Hayes (incumbent)	28,351	59.62%
Democratic	Susan J. Grelick	15,287	32.15%
	Scattering	2,408	5.07%
Independence	Judy A. Rudes	1,501	3.16%
Total votes		47,547	100.0%
Republican hold			

=== District 149 ===
District 149 election, 2006
Party	Candidate	Votes	%
Republican	Joseph Giglio (incumbent)	20,417	57.02%
Democratic	Linda L. Witte	13,472	37.62%
	Scattering	1,921	5.36%
Total votes		35,810	100.0%
Republican hold			

=== District 150 ===
District 150 election, 2006
Party	Candidate	Votes	%
Democratic	William Parment (incumbent)	22,346	65.04%
	Scattering	12,010	34.96%
Total votes		34,356	100.0%
Democratic hold			
