= 2016 New York State Assembly election =

- November 8, 2016

150 seats from the New York State Assembly 75 seats needed for a majority
- Turnout: 53.04%
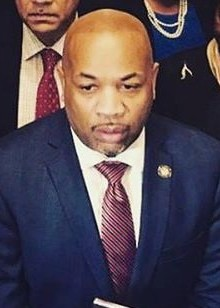

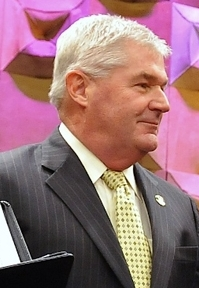

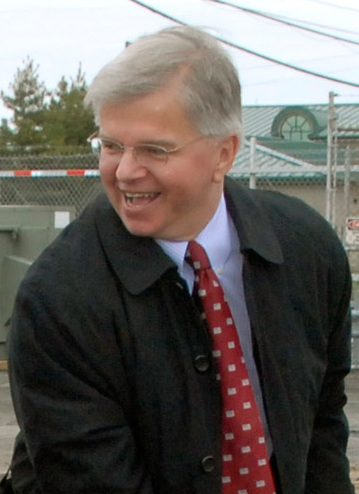

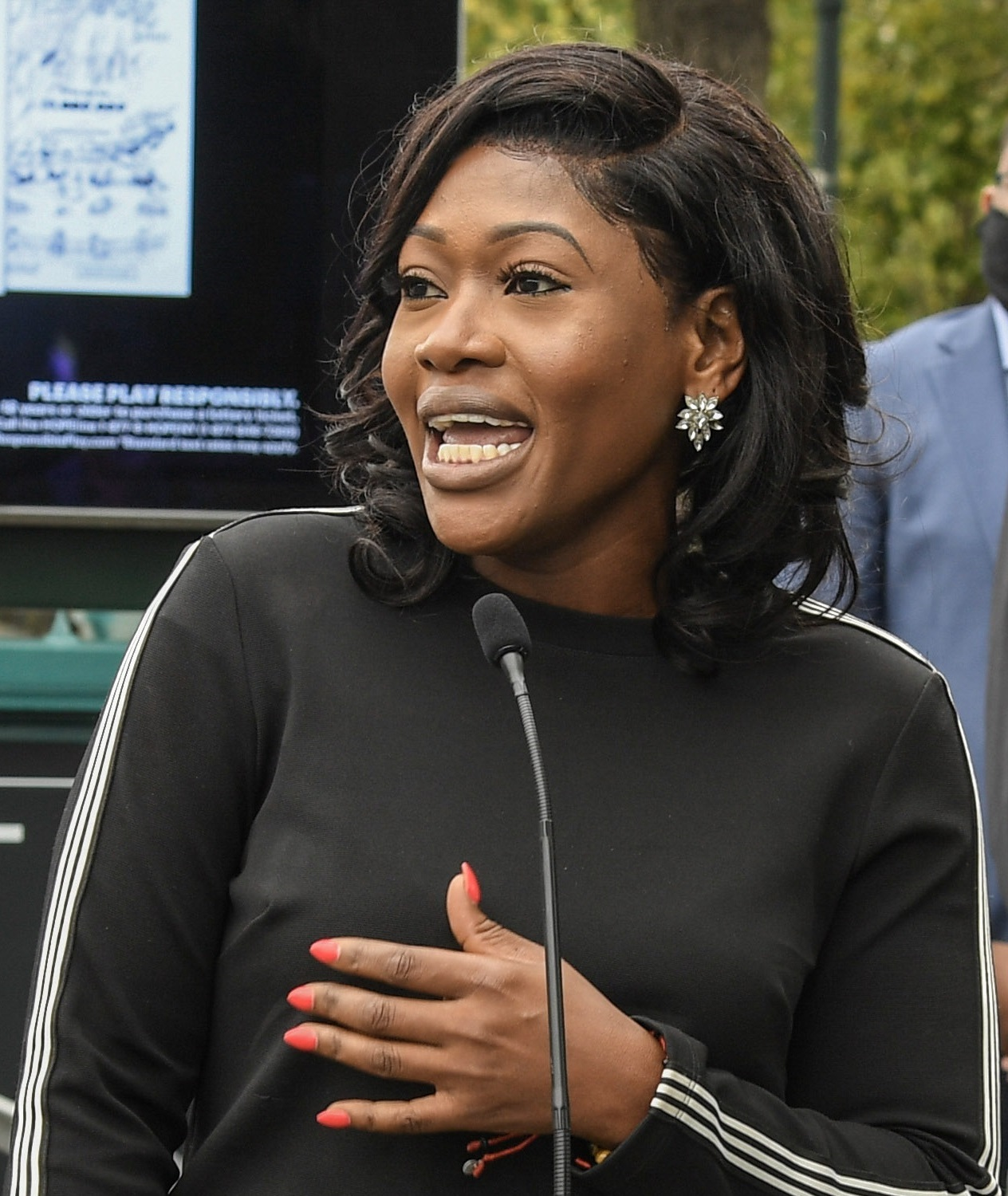

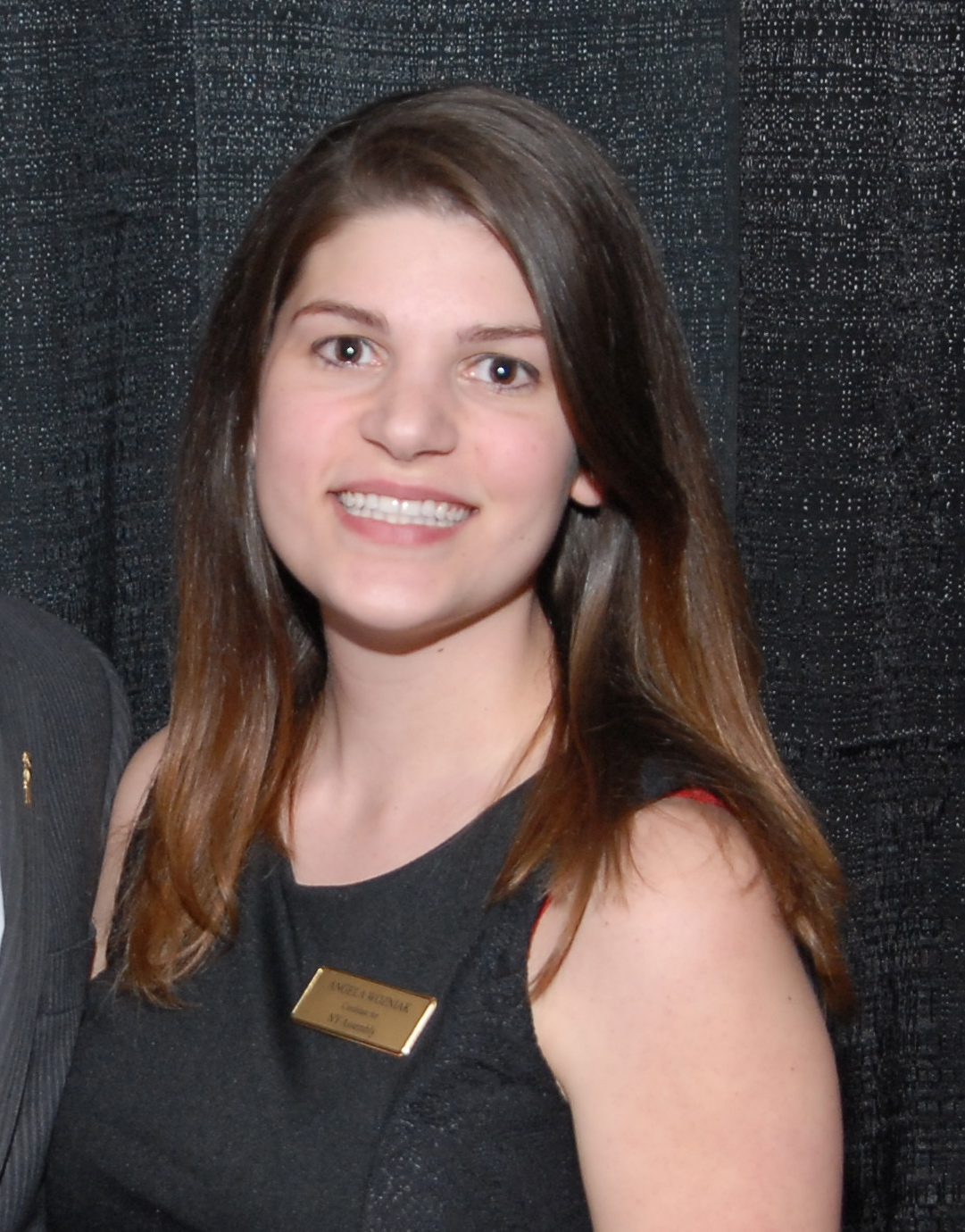
	Majority party	Minority party	Third party
Leader	Carl Heastie	Brian Kolb	Fred Thiele (Note: Thiele caucuses with the Democrats.)
Party	Democratic	Republican	Independence
Leader's seat	83rd district	131st district	1st district
Seats before	105	42	1
Seats after	106 (Note: Includes Diana Richardson of the 43rd District, who was originally elected on the Working Families line but now considers herself a Democrat as well.)	43	1
Seat change	▲1	▲1	Steady
Popular vote	3,851,654	2,041,214	181,577
Percentage	58.12%	30.80%	2.74%
	Fourth party	Fifth party
Leader	Diana Richardson (Joined Democratic Caucus)	Angela Wozniak (retired)
Party	Working Families	Conservative
Leader's seat	43rd district	143rd district
Seats before	1	1
Seats after	0	0
Seat change	▼1	▼1
Popular vote	169,524	306,448
Percentage	2.56%	4.62%
- Results: Democratic hold Democratic gain Republican hold Republican gain Independence hold
Speaker before election
Carl Heastie
Democratic
Speaker
Carl Heastie
Democratic

The 2016 New York State Assembly elections were held on Tuesday, November 8, 2016, with the primary election on September 13, 2016. Voters in the 150 districts of the New York State Assembly elected their representatives. The elections coincided with the elections for other offices, including for U.S. President, the U.S. Senate and the state senate. Assembly Democrats won 106 of the chamber's 150 seats on election day, while Republicans won 43 seats and Independence party member Fred Thiele won 1 seat.

== Overview ==
2016 New York State Assembly elections General election — November 8, 2016
Party	Votes	Percentage	Contested	Before	After	+/–
Democratic	3,851,654	58.12%	133	105	105	Steady
Republican	2,041,214	30.80%	103	42	43	▲1
Independence	181,577	2.74%	94	1	1	Steady
Working Families	169,524	2.56%	85	1	1	Steady
Conservative	306,448	4.62%	91	1	0	▼1
Reform	26,238	0.40%	70	0	0	Steady
Women's Equality	25,106	0.38%	42	0	0	Steady
Green	19,264	0.29%	12	0	0	Steady
Stop de Blasio	1,499	0.02%	3	0	0	Steady
Tax Revolt	1,222	0.02%	3	0	0	Steady
Libertarian	1,149	0.02%	2	0	0	Steady
Tax Cuts Now	1,047	0.02%	1	0	0	Steady
New Ideas	914	0.01%	1	0	0	Steady

== Predictions ==
Source	Ranking	As of
Governing	Safe D	October 12, 2016

== Assembly Districts ==
District	Member	Party	First elected	Status	Winner
1	Fred Thiele	Dem	1995+	Incumbent re-elected.	Fred Thiele
2	Anthony Palumbo	Rep	2013+	Incumbent re-elected.	Anthony Palumbo
3	L. Dean Murray	Rep	2014	Incumbent re-elected.	L. Dean Murray
4	Steve Englebright	Dem	1992+	Incumbent re-elected.	Steve Englebright
5	Al Graf	Rep	2010	Incumbent re-elected.	Al Graf
6	Philip Ramos	Dem	2002	Incumbent re-elected.	Philip Ramos
7	Andrew Garbarino	Rep	2012	Incumbent re-elected.	Andrew Garbarino
8	Michael J. Fitzpatrick	Rep	2002	Incumbent re-elected.	Michael J. Fitzpatrick
9	Joe Saladino	Rep	2004+	Incumbent re-elected.	Joe Saladino
10	Chad Lupinacci	Dem	2012	Incumbent re-elected.	Chad Lupinacci
11	Kimberly Jean-Pierre	Dem	2014	Incumbent re-elected.	Kimberly Jean-Pierre
12	Andrew Raia	Rep	2002	Incumbent re-elected.	Andrew Raia
13	Charles D. Lavine	Dem	2004	Incumbent re-elected.	Charles D. Lavine
14	David McDonough	Rep	2002+	Incumbent re-elected.	David McDonough
15	Michael Montesano	Rep	2010+	Incumbent re-elected.	Michael Montesano
16	Michelle Schimel	Dem	2007+	Incumbent retired. Democratic hold.	Anthony D'Urso
17	Thomas McKevitt	Rep	2006+	Incumbent re-elected.	Thomas McKevitt
18	Earlene Hooper	Dem	1988+	Incumbent re-elected.	Earlene Hooper
19	Ed Ra	Rep	2010	Incumbent re-elected.	Ed Ra
20	Vacant, previously Todd Kaminsky	Dem	2014	Incumbent resigned on May 3, 2016 to take office as a State Senator. Republican gain.	Melissa Miller
21	Brian Curran	Rep	2010	Incumbent re-elected.	Brian Curran
22	Michaelle C. Solages	Dem	2012	Incumbent re-elected.	Michaelle C. Solages
23	Phil Goldfeder	Dem	2011+	Incumbent retired. Democratic hold.	Stacey Pheffer Amato
24	David Weprin	Dem	2010+	Incumbent re-elected.	David Weprin
25	Nily Rozic	Dem	2012	Incumbent re-elected.	Nily Rozic
26	Edward Braunstein	Dem	2010	Incumbent re-elected.	Edward Braunstein
27	Michael Simanowitz	Dem	2011+	Incumbent re-elected.	Michael Simanowitz
28	Andrew Hevesi	Dem	2005+	Incumbent re-elected.	Andrew Hevesi
29	Alicia Hyndman	Dem	2015+	Incumbent re-elected.	Alicia Hyndman
30	Margaret Markey	Dem	1998	Incumbent retired. Democratic hold.	Brian Barnwell
31	Michele Titus	Dem	2002+	Incumbent re-elected.	Michele Titus
32	Vivian E. Cook	Dem	1990	Incumbent re-elected.	Vivian E. Cook
33	Clyde Vanel	Dem	2016+	Incumbent re-elected.	Clyde Vanel
34	Michael DenDekker	Dem	2008	Incumbent re-elected.	Michael DenDekker
35	Jeffrion L. Aubry	Dem	1992+	Incumbent re-elected.	Jeffrion L. Aubry
36	Aravella Simotas	Dem	2010	Incumbent re-elected.	Aravella Simotas
37	Catherine Nolan	Dem	1984	Incumbent re-elected.	Catherine Nolan
38	Michael G. Miller	Dem	2009+	Incumbent re-elected.	Michael G. Miller
39	Francisco Moya	Dem	2010	Incumbent re-elected.	Francisco Moya
40	Ron Kim	Dem	2012	Incumbent re-elected.	Ron Kim
41	Helene Weinstein	Dem	1980	Incumbent re-elected.	Helene Weinstein
42	Rodneyse Bichotte	Dem	2014	Incumbent re-elected.	Rodneyse Bichotte
43	Diana Richardson	Dem	2015+	Incumbent re-elected.	Diana Richardson
44	James Brennan	Dem	1984	Incumbent retired. Democratic hold.	Robert Carroll
45	Steven Cymbrowitz	Dem	2000	Incumbent re-elected.	Steven Cymbrowitz
46	Pamela Harris	Dem	2015+	Incumbent re-elected.	Pamela Harris
47	William Colton	Dem	1996	Incumbent re-elected.	William Colton
48	Dov Hikind	Dem	1982	Incumbent re-elected.	Dov Hikind
49	Peter J. Abbate Jr.	Dem	1986	Incumbent re-elected.	Peter J. Abbate Jr.
50	Joe Lentol	Dem	1972	Incumbent re-elected.	Joe Lentol
51	Felix Ortiz	Dem	1994	Incumbent re-elected.	Felix Ortiz
52	Jo Anne Simon	Dem	2014	Incumbent re-elected.	Jo Anne Simon
53	Maritza Davila	Dem	2013+	Incumbent re-elected.	Maritza Davila
54	Erik Martin Dilan	Dem	2014	Incumbent re-elected.	Erik Martin Dilan
55	Latrice Walker	Dem	2014	Incumbent re-elected.	Latrice Walker
56	Annette Robinson	Dem	1991+	Incumbent retired. Democratic hold.	Tremaine Wright
57	Walter Mosley	Dem	2012	Incumbent re-elected.	Walter Mosley
58	N. Nick Perry	Dem	1992	Incumbent re-elected.	N. Nick Perry
59	Jaime Williams	Dem	2016+	Incumbent re-elected.	Jaime Williams
60	Charles Barron	Dem	2014	Incumbent re-elected.	Charles Barron
61	Matthew Titone	Dem	2007+	Incumbent re-elected.	Matthew Titone
62	Ronald Castorina	Rep	2016+	Incumbent re-elected.	Ronald Castorina
63	Michael Cusick	Dem	2002	Incumbent re-elected.	Michael Cusick
64	Nicole Malliotakis	Rep	2010	Incumbent re-elected.	Nicole Malliotakis
65	Alice Cancel	Dem	2016+	Incumbent lost renomination. Democratic hold.	Yuh-Line Niou
66	Deborah J. Glick	Dem	1990	Incumbent re-elected.	Deborah J. Glick
67	Linda Rosenthal	Dem	2006+	Incumbent re-elected.	Linda Rosenthal
68	Robert J. Rodriguez	Dem	2010	Incumbent re-elected.	Robert J. Rodriguez
69	Daniel J. O'Donnell	Dem	2002	Incumbent re-elected.	Daniel J. O'Donnell
70	Keith L. T. Wright	Dem	1992	Incumbent retired to run for Congress. Democratic hold.	Inez Dickens
71	Herman Farrell	Dem	1974	Incumbent re-elected.	Herman Farrell
72	Guillermo Linares	Dem	2014	Incumbent lost renomination. Democratic hold.	Carmen De La Rosa
73	Dan Quart	Dem	2011+	Incumbent re-elected.	Dan Quart
74	Brian Kavanagh	Dem	2006	Incumbent re-elected.	Brian Kavanagh
75	Richard N. Gottfried	Dem	1970	Incumbent re-elected.	Richard N. Gottfried
76	Rebecca Seawright	Dem	2014	Incumbent re-elected.	Rebecca Seawright
77	Latoya Joyner	Dem	2014	Incumbent re-elected.	Latoya Joyner
78	Jose Rivera	Dem	2000	Incumbent re-elected.	Jose Rivera
79	Michael Blake	Dem	2014	Incumbent re-elected.	Michael Blake
80	Mark Gjonaj	Dem	2012	Incumbent re-elected.	Mark Gjonaj
81	Jeffrey Dinowitz	Dem	1994+	Incumbent re-elected.	Jeffrey Dinowitz
82	Michael Benedetto	Dem	2004	Incumbent re-elected.	Michael Benedetto
83	Carl Heastie	Dem	2000	Incumbent re-elected.	Carl Heastie
84	Carmen Arroyo	Dem	1994+	Incumbent re-elected.	Carmen Arroyo
85	Marcos Crespo	Dem	2009+	Incumbent re-elected.	Marcos Crespo
86	Victor Pichardo	Dem	2013+	Incumbent re-elected.	Victor Pichardo
87	Luis Sepulveda	Dem	2012	Incumbent re-elected.	Luis Sepulveda
88	Amy Paulin	Dem	2000	Incumbent re-elected.	Amy Paulin
89	J. Gary Pretlow	Dem	1992	Incumbent re-elected.	J. Gary Pretlow
90	Shelley Mayer	Dem	2012+	Incumbent re-elected.	Shelley Mayer
91	Steven Otis	Dem	2012	Incumbent re-elected.	Steven Otis
92	Thomas J. Abinanti	Dem	2010	Incumbent re-elected.	Thomas J. Abinanti
93	David Buchwald	Dem	2012	Incumbent re-elected.	David Buchwald
94	Steve Katz	Rep	2010	Incumbent retired. Republican hold.	Kevin Byrne
95	Sandy Galef	Dem	1992	Incumbent re-elected.	Sandy Galef
96	Kenneth Zebrowski Jr.	Dem	2007+	Incumbent re-elected.	Kenneth Zebrowski Jr.
97	Ellen Jaffee	Dem	2006	Incumbent re-elected.	Ellen Jaffee
98	Karl A. Brabenec	Rep	2014	Incumbent re-elected.	Karl A. Brabenec
99	James Skoufis	Dem	2012	Incumbent re-elected.	James Skoufis
100	Aileen Gunther	Dem	2003+	Incumbent re-elected.	Aileen Gunther
101	Claudia Tenney	Rep	2010	Incumbent retired. Republican hold.	Brian Miller
102	Pete Lopez	Rep	2006	Incumbent re-elected.	Pete Lopez
103	Kevin A. Cahill	Dem	1998	Incumbent re-elected.	Kevin A. Cahill
104	Frank Skartados	Dem	2008	Incumbent re-elected.	Frank Skartados
105	Kieran Lalor	Rep	2012	Incumbent re-elected.	Kieran Lalor
106	Didi Barrett	Dem	2012+	Incumbent re-elected.	Didi Barrett
107	Steven McLaughlin	Rep	2010	Incumbent re-elected.	Steven McLaughlin
108	John T. McDonald III	Dem	2012	Incumbent re-elected.	John T. McDonald III
109	Patricia Fahy	Dem	2012	Incumbent re-elected.	Patricia Fahy
110	Phillip Steck	Dem	2012	Incumbent re-elected.	Phillip Steck
111	Angelo Santabarbara	Dem	2012	Incumbent re-elected.	Angelo Santabarbara
112	Jim Tedisco	Rep	1982	Incumbent retired to run for State Senate. Republican hold.	Mary Beth Walsh
113	Carrie Woerner	Dem	2014	Incumbent re-elected.	Carrie Woerner
114	Dan Stec	Rep	2012	Incumbent re-elected.	Dan Stec
115	Janet Duprey	Rep	2006	Incumbent retired. Democratic gain.	Billy Jones
116	Addie Jenne	Dem	2008	Incumbent re-elected.	Addie Jenne
117	Ken Blankenbush	Rep	2010	Incumbent re-elected.	Ken Blankenbush
118	Marc W. Butler	Rep	1995+	Incumbent re-elected.	Marc W. Butler
119	Anthony Brindisi	Dem	2011+	Incumbent re-elected.	Anthony Brindisi
120	William A. Barclay	Rep	2002	Incumbent re-elected.	William A. Barclay
121	Bill Magee	Dem	1990	Incumbent re-elected.	Bill Magee
122	Clifford Crouch	Rep	1995+	Incumbent re-elected.	Clifford Crouch
123	Donna Lupardo	Dem	2004	Incumbent re-elected.	Donna Lupardo
124	Christopher S. Friend	Rep	2010	Incumbent re-elected.	Christopher S. Friend
125	Barbara Lifton	Dem	2002	Incumbent re-elected.	Barbara Lifton
126	Gary Finch	Rep	1999+	Incumbent re-elected.	Gary Finch
127	Albert A. Stirpe Jr.	Dem	2012	Incumbent re-elected.	Albert A. Stirpe Jr.
128	Pamela Hunter	Dem	2015+	Incumbent re-elected.	Pamela Hunter
129	William Magnarelli	Dem	1998	Incumbent re-elected.	William Magnarelli
130	Bob Oaks	Rep	1992	Incumbent re-elected.	Bob Oaks
131	Brian Kolb	Rep	2000+	Incumbent re-elected.	Brian Kolb
132	Phil Palmesano	Rep	2010	Incumbent re-elected.	Phil Palmesano
133	Joseph Errigo	Rep	2016+	Incumbent re-elected.	Joseph Errigo
134	Peter Lawrence	Rep	2014	Incumbent re-elected.	Peter Lawrence
135	Mark Johns	Rep	2010	Incumbent re-elected.	Mark Johns
136	Joseph Morelle	Dem	1990	Incumbent re-elected.	Joseph Morelle
137	David Gantt	Dem	1982	Incumbent re-elected.	David Gantt
138	Harry Bronson	Dem	2010	Incumbent re-elected.	Harry Bronson
139	Stephen Hawley	Rep	2006+	Incumbent re-elected.	Stephen Hawley
140	Robin Schimminger	Dem	1976	Incumbent re-elected.	Robin Schimminger
141	Crystal Peoples-Stokes	Dem	2002	Incumbent re-elected.	Crystal Peoples-Stokes
142	Michael Kearns	Rep	2012+	Incumbent re-elected.	Michael Kearns
143	Angela Wozniak	Rep	2014	Incumbent retired. Democratic gain.	Monica P. Wallace
144	Jane Corwin	Rep	2008	Incumbent retired. Republican hold.	Michael Norris
145	John Ceretto	Rep	2010	Incumbent retired. Republican hold.	Angelo Morinello
146	Raymond Walter	Rep	2010	Incumbent re-elected.	Raymond Walter
147	David DiPietro	Rep	2012	Incumbent re-elected.	David DiPietro
148	Joseph Giglio	Rep	2005+	Incumbent re-elected.	Joseph Giglio
149	Sean Ryan	Dem	2011+	Incumbent re-elected.	Sean Ryan
150	Andy Goodell	Rep	2010	Incumbent re-elected.	Andy Goodell

- +Elected in a special election.
