= Brian Maher =

American politician

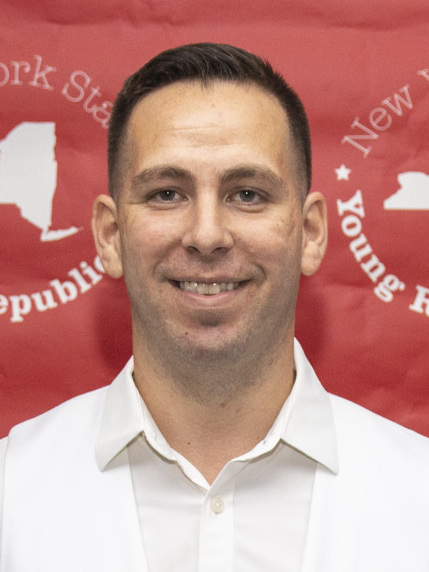
- Maher in 2021

Member of the New York State Assembly from the 101st district
- Incumbent
- Assumed office January 3, 2023
- Preceded by: Brian Miller (redistricting)

Town Supervisor of Montgomery
- In office January 1, 2020 – 2022
- Preceded by: Rodney Mitchell
- Succeeded by: Ronald Feller

Mayor of Walden, New York
- In office 2009–2015
- Succeeded by: Susan Taylor

Personal details
- Party: Republican

Brian Maher is an American politician from the state of New York. A Republican, Maher is a member of the New York State Assembly from the 101st district. Before being elected to the Assembly in 2022, he previously served as mayor of Walden, New York and as town supervisor of Montgomery, New York.

== Career ==
Maher's first elected office was working as a mayor. From 2009 to 2015, he was Mayor of the Village of Walden. After his tenure as Mayor, he ran for Supervisor of the Town of Montgomery, the area in which the Village of Walden is located in. He later won the race.

Before running for assembly, Maher worked as a communications director for the office of State Senator Bill Larkin. He first ran for the 101st State Assembly district in 2012, placing second in the Republican primary to then-incumbent Claudia Tenney. In early 2022, Maher announced his second campaign for the same district. After winning the election, he was sworn in on January 3, 2023.
