= New York's 122nd State Assembly district =

American legislative district

Assemblymember
| Brian Miller; R–New Hartford |

New York's 122nd State Assembly district is one of the 150 districts in the New York State Assembly. It has been represented by Brian Miller since 2023, succeeding Joe Angelino, who represents District 121 following the 2021-22 redistricting process. Miller previously represented District 101.

== Geography ==
=== 2020s ===
District 122 contains portions of Herkimer, Madison, Oneida and Otsego counties.

=== 2010s ===
District 122 contains portions of Broome, Chenango, Delaware and Otsego counties.

== Recent election results ==
=== 2026 ===
2026 New York State Assembly election, District 122
| Party | Candidate | Votes | % |
|---|---|---|---|
| Republican | Brian Miller | | |
| Conservative | Brian Miller | | |
| Total | Brian Miller (incumbent) | | |
| Democratic | Ihor Semko | | |
| Working Families | Ihor Semko | | |
| Total | Ihor Semko | | |
| Write-in | | | |
| Total votes | | | |

=== 2024 ===
2024 New York State Assembly election, District 122
| Party | Candidate | Votes | % |
|---|---|---|---|
| Republican | Brian Miller | 37,172 | |
| Conservative | Brian Miller | 4,533 | |
| Total | Brian Miller (incumbent) | 41,705 | 62.8 |
| Democratic | Adrienne Martini | 22,415 | |
| Working Families | Adrienne Martini | 2,215 | |
| Total | Adrienne Martini | 24,630 | 37.1 |
| Write-in | | 35 | 0.1 |
| Total votes | | 66,370 | 100.0 |
| Republican hold | | | |

=== 2022 ===
2022 New York State Assembly election, District 122
| Party | Candidate | Votes | % |
|---|---|---|---|
| Republican | Brian Miller | 27,913 | |
| Conservative | Brian Miller | 3,920 | |
| Total | Brian Miller | 31,833 | 62.9 |
| Democratic | Dan Buttermann | 17,425 | 34.4 |
| Working Families | Colton Mennig | 1,315 | 2.6 |
| Write-in | | 21 | 0.0 |
| Total votes | | 50,594 | 100.0 |
| Republican win (new boundaries) | | | |

=== 2020 ===
2020 New York State Assembly election, District 122
Primary election
| Party | Candidate | Votes | % |
|---|---|---|---|
| Republican | Joe Angelino | 8,260 | 72.0 |
| Republican | Nicholas Libous | 1,882 | 16.4 |
| Republican | James Powers | 670 | 5.9 |
| Republican | Victor Furman | 646 | 5.6 |
| Write-in | | 8 | 0.1 |
| Total votes | | 11,466 | 100 |
General election
| Republican | Joe Angelino | 37,142 | |
| Conservative | Joe Angelino | 2,560 | |
| Independence | Joe Angelino | 1,683 | |
| Total | Joe Angelino | 41,385 | 69.0 |
| Democratic | Richard Shaw | 18,632 | 31.0 |
| Write-in | | 32 | 0.0 |
| Total votes | | 60,049 | 100.0 |
| Republican hold | | | |

=== 2018 ===
2018 New York State Assembly election, District 122
Primary election
| Party | Candidate | Votes | % |
|---|---|---|---|
| Republican | Clifford Crouch (incumbent) | 5,927 | 71.6 |
| Republican | Nicholas Libous | 2,348 | 28.4 |
| Write-in | | 0 | 0.0 |
| Total votes | | 8,275 | 100 |
General election
| Republican | Clifford Crouch | 33,568 | |
| Reform | Clifford Crouch | 1,305 | |
| Total | Clifford Crouch (incumbent) | 34,873 | 85.0 |
| Conservative | Nicholas Libous | 6,026 | 14.7 |
| Write-in | | 139 | 0.3 |
| Total votes | | 41,038 | 100.0 |
| Republican hold | | | |

=== 2016 ===
2016 New York State Assembly election, District 122
| Party | Candidate | Votes | % |
|---|---|---|---|
| Republican | Clifford Crouch (incumbent) | 41,967 | 99.6 |
| Write-in | | 170 | 0.4 |
| Total votes | | 42,137 | 100.0 |
| Republican hold | | | |

=== 2014 ===
2014 New York State Assembly election, District 122
| Party | Candidate | Votes | % |
|---|---|---|---|
| Republican | Clifford Crouch (incumbent) | 26,739 | 99.7 |
| Write-in | | 70 | 0.3 |
| Total votes | | 26,809 | 100.0 |
| Republican hold | | | |

=== 2012 ===
2012 New York State Assembly election, District 122
| Party | Candidate | Votes | % |
|---|---|---|---|
| Republican | Clifford Crouch (incumbent) | 38,330 | 99.8 |
| Write-in | | 79 | 0.2 |
| Total votes | | 38,409 | 100.0 |
| Republican hold | | | |
