= John Salka =

American politician

Member of the New York State Assembly from the 121st district
- In office January 9, 2019 – January 6, 2021
- Preceded by: William Magee
- Succeeded by: Joe Angelino (residtricted)

Personal details
- Born: November 14, 1954 (age 71) Utica, New York, U.S.
- Party: Republican
- Spouse: Erin
- Children: 2
- Education: Mohawk Valley Community College (AS)
- Website: State Assembly website Campaign website

John J. Salka is an American politician and respiratory therapist from the state of New York. A Republican, Salka has represented the 121st district of the New York State Assembly, based in Madison and Otsego Counties, since 2019.

== Career ==
Salka has worked as a respiratory therapist for 30 years, currently serving as the director of cardiopulmonary services at Community Memorial Hospital in Hamilton.

== Electoral history ==
Salka was elected as Brookfield Town Supervisor in 2007, a position he held until 2018.

In 2014, Salka ran for the New York State Assembly's 121st district, challenging long-serving incumbent Democrat William Magee. Salka lost, 53-47%. He ran again against Magee in 2016, losing by a slightly narrower margin of 52-48%.

Salka announced a third run for the Assembly in 2018, this time defeating Magee 51-49%. He took office on January 9, 2019.

== Personal life ==
Salka lives in Brookfield with his wife, Erin. They had two children, a son and a daughter. Their daughter died of brain cancer in 2015.
