= New York's 121st State Assembly district =

American legislative district

Assemblymember
Joe Angelino; R–Norwich

New York's 121st State Assembly district is one of the 150 districts in the New York State Assembly. It has been represented by Republican Joe Angelino since 2023, succeeding John Salka. Prior to redistricting, Angelino represented District 122.

== Geography ==
=== 2020s ===
==== 2023-present ====
District 121 contains portions of Broome, Chenango, Delaware, Madison, and Otsego counties. The district includes the city of Norwich, as well as the towns of Smyrna, Norwich, Sherburne, Columbus, New Berlin, North Norwich, Plymouth, Preston, Oxford, Guilford, Bainbridge, Afton, Coventry, Greene, Sanford, Windsor, Colesville, Fenton, Kirkwood, Conklin, Binghamton, Dickinson, Chenango, Deposit, Tompkins, Masonville, Sidney, Unadilla, Otego, Butternuts, Morris, Pittsfield, Edmeston, Eaton, Brookfield, Madison, Lebanon and Hamilton.

The district overlaps (partially) with the 19th and 22nd congressional districts, and with the 51st, 52nd and 53rd districts of the New York State Senate.

==== 2020-2022 ====
District 121 contained portions of Broome, Chenango, Delaware, Madison, Otsego and Sullivan counties. The district included the city of Norwich, as well as the towns of Smyrna, Norwich, Sherburne, Columbus, New Berlin, North Norwich, Plymouth, Preston, Oxford, Guilford, Bainbridge, Afton, Coventry, Greene, Otselic, Pharsalia, McDonough, Smithville, Sanford, Windsor, Colesville, Fenton, Kirkwood, Conklin, Binghamton, Dickinson, Chenango, Deposit, Tompkins, Masonville, Sidney, Walton, Colchester, Hancock, Fremont, Unadilla, Butternuts, Eaton, Nelson, Georgetown, Madison, Lebanon and Hamilton.

=== 2010s ===
This district encompasses the entirety of Madison County and portions of Oneida County and Otsego County. The district included the cities of Oneida, Sherrill and Oneonta, and the towns of Eaton, Nelson, Georgetown, Madison, Lebanon, Hamilton, Brookfield, DeRuyter, Cazenovia, Sullivan, Lenox, Lincoln, Fenner, Smithfield, Sullivan, Stockbridge, Vernon, Augusta, Marshall, Sangerfield, Bridgewater, Pittsfield, Edmeston, Plainfield, Richfield, Exeter, Otsego, New Lisbon, Hartwick, Oneonta, Laurens, Milford and Otego.

== Recent election results ==
=== 2026 ===
2026 New York State Assembly election, District 121
Party	Candidate	Votes	%
Republican	Joe Angelino		
Conservative	Joe Angelino		
Total	Joe Angelino (incumbent)		
Democratic	Vicki Davis		
Write-in			
Total votes			

=== 2024 ===
2024 New York State Assembly election, District 121
Party	Candidate	Votes	%
Republican	Joe Angelino	38,373	
Conservative	Joe Angelino	3,886	
Total	Joe Angelino (incumbent)	42,259	67.5
Democratic	Vicki Davis	20,325	32.4
Write-in		56	0.1
Total votes		62,640	100.0
Republican hold			

=== 2022 ===
2022 New York State Assembly election, District 121
Party	Candidate	Votes	%
Republican	Joe Angelino	36,702	
Conservative	Joe Angelino	4,711	
Total	Joe Angelino	41,413	99.5
Write-in		228	0.5
Total votes		41,641	100.0
Republican hold			

=== 2020 ===
2020 New York State Assembly election, District 121
Primary election
Party	Candidate	Votes	%
Democratic	Dan Buttermann	3,845	60.2
Democratic	Corey Mosher	2,529	39.6
Write-in		12	0.2
Total votes		6,386	100
General election
Republican	John Salka	30,174	
Conservative	John Salka	2,794	
Independence	John Salka	1,128	
Total	John Salka (incumbent)	34,096	58.9
Democratic	Dan Buttermann	21,595	37.3
Working Families	Corey Mosher	1,507	2.6
Libertarian	Jake Cornell	715	1.2
Write-in		13	0.0
Total votes		57,926	100.0
Republican hold			

=== 2018 ===
2018 New York State Assembly election, District 121
Primary election
Party	Candidate	Votes	%
Democratic	William Magee (incumbent)	3,681	60.4
Democratic	Dan Buttermann	2,415	39.6
Write-in		0	0.0
Total votes		6,096	100
General election
Republican	John Salka	20,171	
Conservative	John Salka	2,799	
Reform	John Salka	350	
Total	John Salka	23,320	50.5
Democratic	William Magee (incumbent)	22,835	49.4
Write-in		40	0.1
Total votes		46,195	100.0
Republican gain from Democratic			

=== 2016 ===
2016 New York State Assembly election, District 121
Party	Candidate	Votes	%
Democratic	William Magee	23,839	
Independence	William Magee	3,278	
Total	William Magee (incumbent)	27,117	52.3
Republican	John Salka	20,760	
Conservative	John Salka	3,249	
Reform	John Salka	658	
Total	John Salka	24,667	47.6
Write-in		20	0.0
Total votes		51,804	100.0
Democratic hold			

=== 2014 ===
2014 New York State Assembly election, District 121
Primary election
Party	Candidate	Votes	%
Democratic	William Magee (incumbent)	2,082	59.3
Democratic	Michael Hennessy	1,431	40.7
Write-in		0	0.0
Total votes		3,513	100
General election
Democratic	William Magee (incumbent)	17,073	52.4
Republican	John Salka	12,729	
Conservative	John Salka	2,710	
Total	John Salka	15,439	47.4
Write-in		52	0.0
Total votes		32,564	100.0
Democratic hold			

=== 2012 ===
2012 New York State Assembly election, District 121
Party	Candidate	Votes	%
Democratic	William Magee (incumbent)	29,148	61.0
Republican	Levi Spires	15,944	
Conservative	Levi Spires	2,661	
Total	Levi Spires	18,605	39.0
Write-in		14	0.0
Total votes		47,767	100.0
Democratic hold			
