= New York's 132nd State Assembly district =

American legislative district

Assemblymember
Philip Palmesano; R–Corning

New York's 132nd State Assembly district is one of the 150 districts in the New York State Assembly. It has been represented by Phil Palmesano since 2011.

== Geography ==
District 132 contains a majority of Steuben County, all of Schuyler and Yates counties, and portions of Chemung and Seneca counties.

== Recent election results ==
=== 2026 ===
2026 New York State Assembly election, District 132
Party	Candidate	Votes	%
Republican	Phil Palmesano		
Conservative	Phil Palmesano		
Total	Phil Palmesano (incumbent)		
Write-in			
Total votes			

=== 2024 ===
2024 New York State Assembly election, District 132
Party	Candidate	Votes	%
Republican	Phil Palmesano	43,055	
Conservative	Phil Palmesano	6,534	
Total	Phil Palmesano (incumbent)	49,589	99.2
Write-in		385	0.8
Total votes		49,974	100.0
Republican hold			

=== 2022 ===
2022 New York State Assembly election, District 132
Party	Candidate	Votes	%
Republican	Phil Palmesano	35,290	
Conservative	Phil Palmesano	4,579	
Total	Phil Palmesano (incumbent)	39,869	99.5
Write-in		198	0.5
Total votes		40,067	100.0
Republican hold			

=== 2020 ===
2020 New York State Assembly election, District 132
Party	Candidate	Votes	%
Republican	Phil Palmesano	41,186	
Conservative	Phil Palmesano	4,479	
Independence	Phil Palmesano	3,189	
Total	Phil Palmesano (incumbent)	48,854	99.6
Write-in		200	0.4
Total votes		49,054	100.0
Republican hold			

=== 2018 ===
2018 New York State Assembly election, District 132
Party	Candidate	Votes	%
Republican	Phil Palmesano	31,536	
Conservative	Phil Palmesano	3,188	
Independence	Phil Palmesano	2,927	
Reform	Phil Palmesano	618	
Total	Phil Palmesano (incumbent)	38,269	99.6
Write-in		169	0.4
Total votes		38,438	100.0
Republican hold			

=== 2016 ===
2016 New York State Assembly election, District 132
Party	Candidate	Votes	%
Republican	Phil Palmesano	36,891	
Conservative	Phil Palmesano	3,849	
Independence	Phil Palmesano	3,562	
Reform	Phil Palmesano	456	
Total	Phil Palmesano (incumbent)	44,758	99.6
Write-in		163	0.4
Total votes		44,921	100.0
Republican hold			

=== 2014 ===
2014 New York State Assembly election, District 132
Party	Candidate	Votes	%
Republican	Phil Palmesano	24,872	
Conservative	Phil Palmesano	3,491	
Independence	Phil Palmesano	2,898	
Total	Phil Palmesano (incumbent)	31,261	99.6
Write-in		111	0.4
Total votes		31,372	100.0
Republican hold			

=== 2012 ===
2012 New York State Assembly election, District 132
Party	Candidate	Votes	%
Republican	Phil Palmesano	31,331	
Independence	Phil Palmesano	4,532	
Conservative	Phil Palmesano	3,717	
Total	Phil Palmesano (incumbent)	39,580	99.7
Write-in		132	0.3
Total votes		39,712	100.0
Republican hold			
