= Brian Miller (New York politician) =

American politician

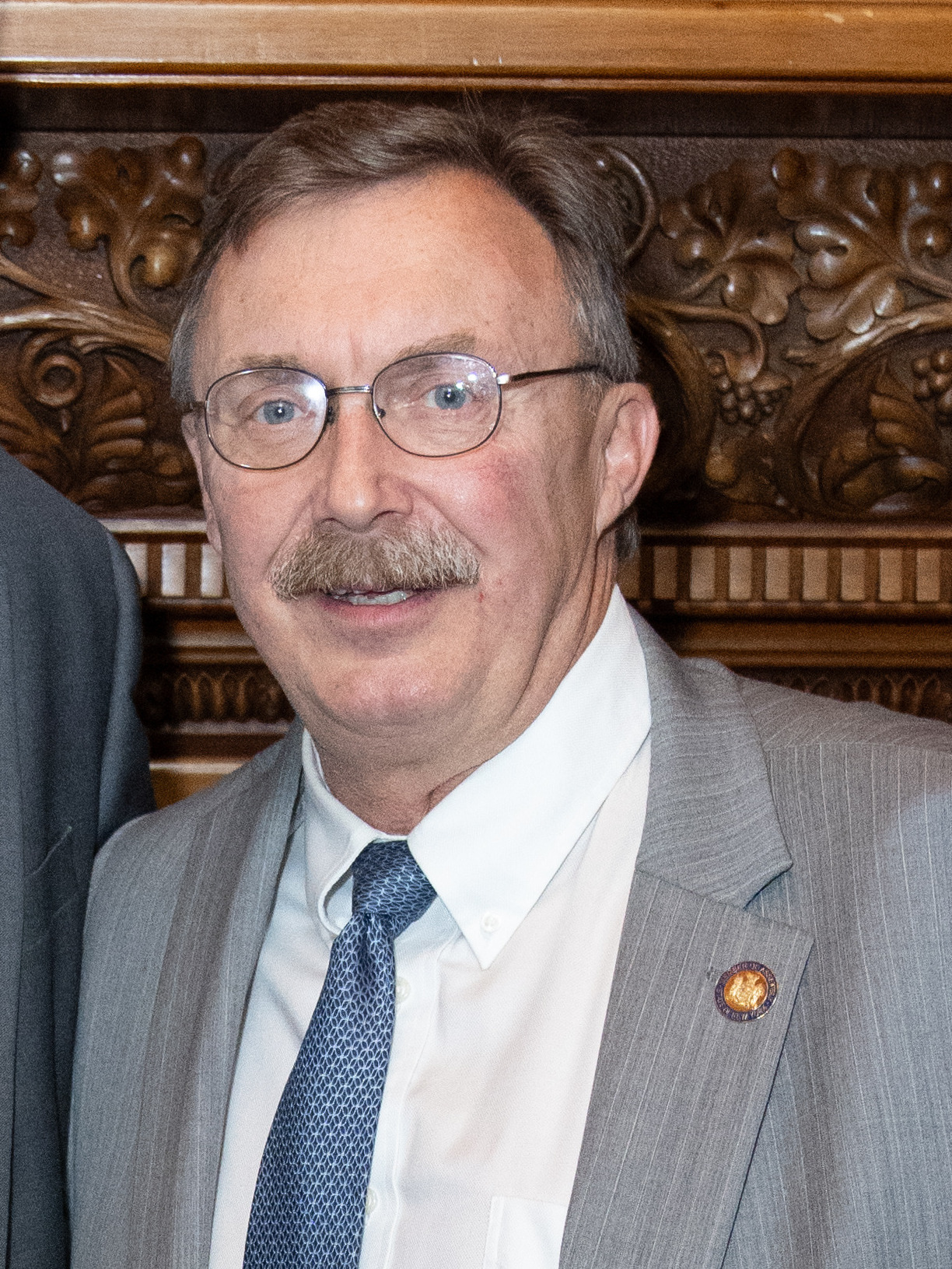

Member of the New York State Assembly from the 122nd district
- Incumbent
- Assumed office January 1, 2017
- Preceded by: Claudia Tenney
- Constituency: 101st district (2017-2022); 122nd district (2023-present)

Member of the Oneida County Legislature for the 16th District
- In office 2000–2016

Bridgewater Town Supervisor

Personal details
- Party: Republican
- Spouse: Dawn Miller
- Children: 3
- Education: Mohawk Valley Community College
- Website: Official website

Brian D. Miller is an American politician and mechanical engineer, currently representing the 122nd District in the New York State Assembly. The district includes portions of Herkimer, Madison, Oneida, and Otsego counties.

== Early life and education ==
Miller is native of Utica, New York. A graduate of Mohawk Valley Community College, Miller has worked as a mechanical engineer for over 30 years.

== Career ==
In 1999, Miller was elected to the Oneida County Legislature, and later served as its chairman of the Public Works Committee, assistant majority leader, and as a member of the Ways and Means Committee. He also was Bridgewater Town Supervisor for eight years.

=== New York State Assembly ===
After Assemblywoman Claudia Tenney was elected to United States House of Representatives in 2016, Miller opted to fill her vacant seat in the New York State Assembly. He defeated Maria Kelso in the Republican primary, winning the nomination by a 54 to 46 percent margin.

In the general election, Miller defeated Democrat Arlene Feldmeier and Kelso again, with over 54 percent of the vote in the three-way race. He was sworn into office in 2017 to succeed Tenney.

== Personal life ==
Miller resides in New Hartford, New York with his wife and son. In March 2020, he was hospitalized with COVID-19, the fourth Assemblymember to be diagnosed.

Political offices
Preceded by Claudia Tenney	New York Assembly, 101st District; 2017–present	Incumbent
