= New York's 101st State Assembly district =

American legislative district

Assemblymember
Brian Maher; R–Montgomery

New York's 101st State Assembly district is one of the 150 districts in the New York State Assembly. It has been represented by Brian Maher since 2023, replacing Brian Miller, who represents District 122 following the 2021-22 redistricting process.

== Geography ==
=== 2020s ===
District 101 includes portions of Delaware, Orange, Sullivan, and Ulster counties. It includes the towns of Goshen, Walden, Ellenville, and towns within New York's Catskill Park such as Shandaken, Denning and Hardenburgh.

The district overlaps (partially) with New York's 18th and 19th congressional districts, and the 39th, 41st, 42nd and 51st districts of the New York State Senate.

=== 2010s ===
District 101 includes portions of Delaware, Herkimer, Oneida, Orange, Otsego, Sullivan, and Ulster counties.

== Recent election results ==
=== 2026 ===
2026 New York State Assembly election, District 101
Party	Candidate	Votes	%
Republican	Brian Maher		
Conservative	Brian Maher		
Total	Brian Maher (incumbent)		
Write-in			
Total votes			

=== 2024 ===
2024 New York State Assembly election, District 101
Party	Candidate	Votes	%
Republican	Brian Maher	38,842	
Conservative	Brian Maher	5,975	
Total	Brian Maher (incumbent)	44,817	99.1
Write-in		428	0.9
Total votes		45,245	100.0
Republican hold			

=== 2022 ===
2022 New York State Assembly election, District 101
Party	Candidate	Votes	%
Republican	Brian Maher	26,985	
Conservative	Brian Maher	3,193	
Total	Brian Maher	30,340	62.3
Democratic	Matthew Mackey	16,750	
Working Families	Matthew Mackey	1,611	
Total	Matthew Mackey	18,361	37.7
Write-in		24	0.0
Total votes		48,725	100.0
Republican hold			

=== 2020 ===
2020 New York State Assembly election, District 101
Party	Candidate	Votes	%
Republican	Brian Miller	32,489	
Conservative	Brian Miller	3,193	
Independence	Brian Miller	1,004	
Total	Brian Miller (incumbent)	36,686	60.0
Democratic	Chad McEvoy	21,374	
Working Families	Chad McEvoy	1,916	
Total	Chad McEvoy	23,290	38.1
Green	Barbara Kidney	1,156	1.9
Write-in		24	0.0
Total votes		61,156	100.0
Republican hold			

=== 2018 ===
2018 New York State Assembly election, District 101
Party	Candidate	Votes	%
Republican	Brian Miller	19,279	
Conservative	Brian Miller	2,332	
Independence	Brian Miller	557	
Reform	Brian Miller	120	
Total	Brian Miller (incumbent)	22,288	58.8
Democratic	Chad McEvoy	14,596	
Working Families	Chad McEvoy	726	
Women's Equality	Chad McEvoy	329	
Total	Chad McEvoy	15,651	41.2
Write-in		13	0.4
Total votes		37,952	100.0
Republican hold			

=== 2016 ===
2016 New York State Assembly election, District 101
Primary election
Party	Candidate	Votes	%
Republican	Brian Miller	1,841	55.0
Republican	Maria Kelso	1,507	45.0
Write-in		0	0.0
Total votes		3,348	100
Reform	Maria Kelso	1	100
Write-in		0	0.0
Total votes		1	100
General election
Republican	Brian Miller	25,880	
Independence	Brian Miller	1,759	
Total	Brian Miller	27,639	54.2
Democratic	Arlene Feldmeier	16,273	
Working Families	Arlene Feldmeier	1,640	
Total	Arlene Feldmeier	17,913	35.2
Conservative	Maria Kelso	5,007	
Reform	Maria Kelso	372	
Total	Maria Kelso	5,379	10.5
Write-in		28	0.1
Total votes		50,959	100.0
Republican hold			

=== 2014 ===
2014 New York State Assembly election, District 101
Primary election
Party	Candidate	Votes	%
Republican	Claudia Tenney (incumbent)	2,429	62.7
Republican	Christopher Farber	1,446	37.3
Write-in		0	0.0
Total votes		3,875	100
General election
Republican	Claudia Tenney	17,578	
Conservative	Claudia Tenney	3,727	
Total	Claudia Tenney (incumbent)	21,305	75.8
Independence	Christopher Farber	6,768	24.1
Write-in		43	0.1
Total votes		28,116	100.0
Republican hold			

=== 2012 ===
2012 New York State Assembly election, District 101
Primary election
Party	Candidate	Votes	%
Republican	Claudia Tenney (incumbent)	3,239	64.7
Republican	Brian Maher	1,765	35.3
Write-in		0	0.0
Total votes		5,004	100
Conservative	Claudia Tenney (incumbent)	129	78.2
Conservative	Brian Maher	35	21.2
Conservative	Dave Maher	1	0.6
Write-in		0	0.0
Total votes		165	100
General election
Republican	Claudia Tenney	26,714	
Conservative	Claudia Tenney	3,150	
Independence	Claudia Tenney	2,203	
Total	Claudia Tenney (incumbent)	32,067	64.5
Democratic	Daniel Carter	17,542	35.3
Write-in		84	0.2
Total votes		49,693	100.0
Republican hold			
