= Phil Palmesano =

American politician

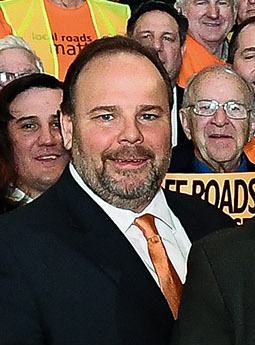

Member of the New York State Assembly from the 132nd district
- Incumbent
- Assumed office January 1, 2011
- Preceded by: Jim Bacalles

Personal details
- Born: April 25, 1969 (age 57) Hornell, New York, U.S.
- Party: Republican
- Spouse: Laura
- Children: 2
- Education: St. Bonaventure University
- Profession: Politician
- Website: Official website

Philip A. Palmesano (born April 25, 1969) is an American politician and member of the New York State Assembly. He represents the 132nd Assembly District which includes parts of Steuben, Seneca and Chemung counties and all of Schuyler and Yates counties.

Palmesano was born in the city of Hornell, New York, and graduated from Hornell High School in 1987. He earned a bachelor's degree in political science from St. Bonaventure University in 1991. After college he worked as an aide to several federal and state lawmakers including former State Assembly members Donald Davidsen and Jim Bacalles, who both represented parts of the district that Palmesano now represents. He worked as the district director for former Congressman Randy Kuhl in 2004 before joining the staff of former State Senator George Winner.

In 2009, Palmesano was elected to represent the city of Corning in the Steuben County Legislature. He served on the Agriculture, Industry and Planning Committee, and the Human Services, Health and Education Committees. In 2010, he was elected to the State Assembly as a Republican, defeating Independent Jason Jordon.

Palmesano and his wife Laura reside in Corning with their two children, Leah and Sam.

== Committees ==
- Energy Committee
- Libraries and Education Technology
- Corporations, Authorities and Commissions
- Real Property Taxation
- Oversight, Analysis and Investigations Committee
- New York State Legislative Commission on Rural Resources

Political offices
Preceded by Francis L. Gehl	Steuben County, New York Legislator, 2nd District; January 1, 2010 – December 31, 2010	Succeeded by Hilda T. Lando
New York State Assembly
Preceded by James G. Bacalles	New York State Assembly, 136th District; January 1, 2011 – December 31, 2012	Succeeded by Joseph D. Morelle
Preceded by Joseph D. Morelle	New York State Assembly, 132nd District; January 1, 2013 – present	Incumbent
