= New York's 89th State Assembly district =

American legislative district

Assemblymember
J. Gary Pretlow; D–Mount Vernon

New York's 89th State Assembly district is located in the southern part of the State of New York in the United States. District 89 is north of New York City in Westchester County, New York and is composed of the City of Mount Vernon, New York as well as Yonkers, New York. It is encompassed by New York's 34th State Senate district, New York's 35th State Senate district, New York's 36th State Senate district, New York's 37th State Senate district, and New York's 16th congressional district

District 89 is currently represented by Democrat J. Gary Pretlow.

== Recent election results ==
=== 2026 ===
2026 New York State Assembly election, District 89
Party	Candidate	Votes	%
Democratic	J. Gary Pretlow (incumbent)		
Write-in			
Total votes			

=== 2024 ===
2024 New York State Assembly election, District 89
Party	Candidate	Votes	%
Democratic	J. Gary Pretlow (incumbent)	31,486	99.8
Write-in		69	0.2
Total votes		31,555	100.0
Democratic hold			

=== 2022 ===
2022 New York State Assembly election, District 89
Party	Candidate	Votes	%
Democratic	J. Gary Pretlow (incumbent)	18,652	90.8
Working Families	Andrae Mitchell	1,824	8.9
Write-in		55	0.3
Total votes		20,531	100.0
Democratic hold			

=== 2020 ===
2020 New York State Assembly election, District 89
Party	Candidate	Votes	%
Democratic	J. Gary Pretlow (incumbent)	35,853	99.8
Write-in		83	0.2
Total votes		35,936	100.0
Democratic hold			

=== 2018 ===
2018 New York State Assembly election, District 89
Party	Candidate	Votes	%
Democratic	J. Gary Pretlow (incumbent)	28,114	99.6
Write-in		127	0.4
Total votes		28,241	100.0
Democratic hold			

=== 2016 ===
2016 New York State Assembly election, District 89
Party	Candidate	Votes	%
Democratic	J. Gary Pretlow	32,711	
Working Families	J. Gary Pretlow	1,211	
Independence	J. Gary Pretlow	693	
Total	J. Gary Pretlow (incumbent)	34,615	99.8
Write-in		84	0.2
Total votes		34,699	100.0
Democratic hold			

=== 2014 ===
2014 New York State Assembly election, District 89
Party	Candidate	Votes	%
Democratic	J. Gary Pretlow	14,854	
Independence	J. Gary Pretlow	885	
Total	J. Gary Pretlow (incumbent)	15,739	99.4
Write-in		91	0.6
Total votes		15,830	100.0
Democratic hold			

=== 2012 ===
2012 New York State Assembly election, District 89
Party	Candidate	Votes	%
Democratic	J. Gary Pretlow	31,685	
Working Families	J. Gary Pretlow	950	
Independence	J. Gary Pretlow	506	
Total	J. Gary Pretlow (incumbent)	33,141	93.9
Conservative	Rosemarie Jarosz	2,147	6.1
Write-in		19	0.0
Total votes		35,307	100.0
Democratic hold			

== Representatives ==
Representative	Party	Years	Note
Cecile D. Singer	Democrat	1989 - 1992	
J. Gary Pretlow	Democrat	1993 – Present	
