= Joe Angelino =

American politician (born 1959)

Member of the New York State Assembly from the 121st district
- Incumbent
- Assumed office January 6, 2021
- Preceded by: Clifford W. Crouch

Personal details
- Born: December 24, 1959 (age 66) Norwich, New York, U.S.
- Party: Republican
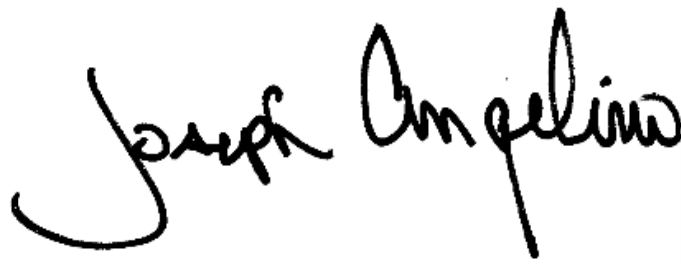
- Signature

Military service
- Branch/service: United States Marine Corps

Joe Angelino (born December 24, 1959) is an American politician and law enforcement officer serving as a member of the New York State Assembly from the 121st district. Elected in November 2020, he assumed office on January 6, 2021.

== Background ==
Angelino was born in Norwich, New York. He served as a member of the United States Marine Corps from 1985 to 2008 and later worked for the Norwich Police Department, retiring as chief of police. Angelino was elected to the New York State Assembly in November 2020 and assumed office on January 6, 2021.
