= Claudia Tenney =

American attorney and politician (born 1961)

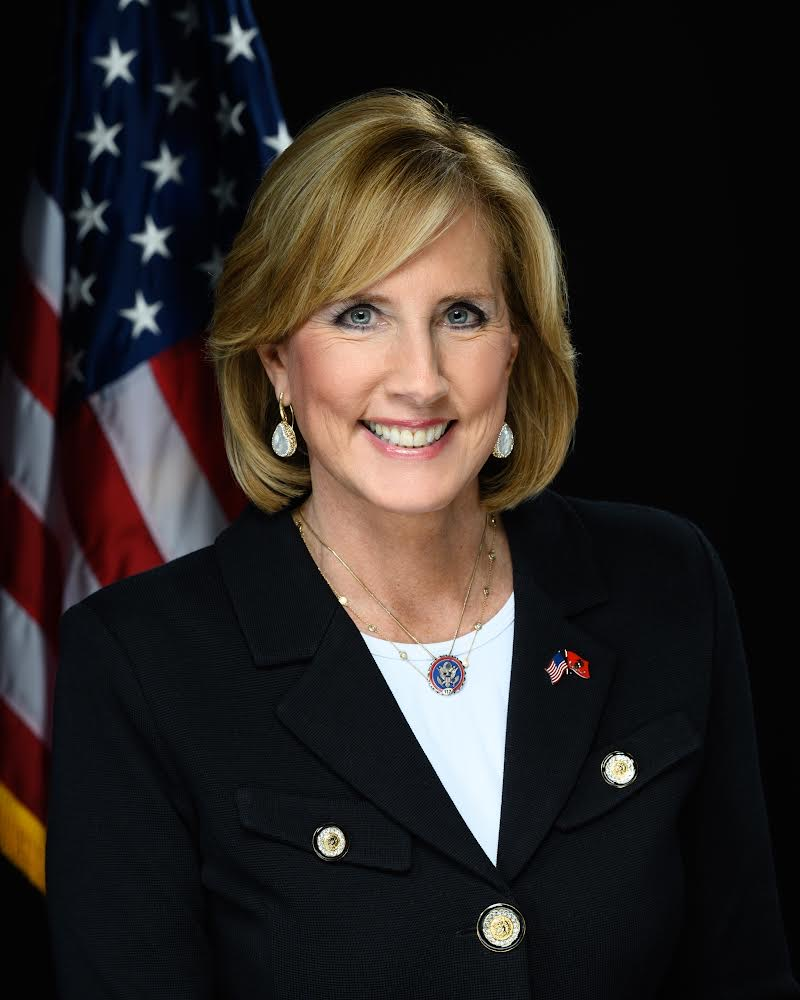
- Official portrait, 2022

Member of the U.S. House of Representatives from New York
- Incumbent
- Assumed office February 11, 2021
- Preceded by: Anthony Brindisi
- Constituency: 22nd district (2021–2023); 24th district (2023–present)
- In office January 3, 2017 – January 3, 2019
- Preceded by: Richard L. Hanna
- Succeeded by: Anthony Brindisi
- Constituency: 22nd district

Member of the New York State Assembly
- In office January 1, 2011 – December 31, 2016
- Preceded by: David Townsend
- Succeeded by: Brian Miller
- Constituency: 115th district (2011–2012); 101st district (2013–2016)

Personal details
- Born: Claudia L. Tenney; February 4, 1961 (age 65) New Hartford, New York, U.S.
- Party: Republican
- Spouse: Wayne Cleary (divorced)
- Children: 1
- Education: Colgate University (BA); University of Cincinnati (JD)
- Website: House website Campaign website
- Tenney's voice Tenney on farmers in the year's upcoming farm bill. Recorded May 23, 2023

Claudia L. Tenney (born February 4, 1961) is an American attorney and politician serving as the U.S. representative for New York's 24th congressional district since 2023. Previously, she represented the 22nd district from 2017 to 2019 and from 2021 to 2023 and sat in the New York State Assembly from 2011 to 2016. She is a member of the Republican Party.

In 2014, Tenney challenged incumbent U.S. Representative Richard L. Hanna in the Republican primary and lost. Tenney was elected to Congress in 2016 after Hanna retired. In 2018, Tenney's unsuccessful race against Democratic Party candidate Anthony Brindisi attracted national attention due to its competitiveness and controversial public statements Tenney had made earlier that year. Tenney's rematch against Brindisi in 2020 was even closer than her 2018 race, leading to a lengthy recount. By the time the judge overseeing the recount ruled in Tenney's favor, the 117th United States Congress had already been in session for a month.

== Early life and education ==
Tenney was born and raised in New Hartford, New York. Her parents were New York State Supreme Court Justice John R. Tenney and Cynthia Tenney. She attended New Hartford High School, where she played basketball and curling and competed in horseback riding. Tenney received a B.A. from Colgate University in 1983 and a J.D. from the University of Cincinnati College of Law in 1987.

== Early career ==
Early in her career, Tenney was the only American employed by the Consulate General of Yugoslavia. She acted as intermediary between ABC Sports and the Yugoslavian government leading up to the 1984 Winter Olympics in Sarajevo.

Tenney was a co-owner of Mid-York Press, a commercial printing company started by her mother's family in 1946. Mid-York Press is in Sherburne, in Chenango County.

Tenney maintained a private law practice in Clinton. Before owning her own firm, she was a partner at the Utica-area law firm of Groben, Gilroy, Oster and Saunders.

In January 2001, Tenney began co-hosting Common Cents, a radio and television program that aired weekly across Oneida and most of Herkimer County. In February 2010, she began co-hosting "First Look" on WIBX 950 Radio.

== Early political involvement ==
In 2002, New York State Assemblyman David R. Townsend Jr. won reelection and asked Tenney to become his legal counsel and Chief of Staff. Though she was going through a divorce at the time, she agreed to take the positions part-time so she could continue operating her law practice and her family-owned newspaper.

In 2009, Tenney ran for Oneida County Surrogate Court Judge as a Republican against incumbent Democrat Louis Gigliotti. She received 45% of the vote to Gigliotti's 55%.

== New York State Assembly ==
After Townsend launched a campaign for Oneida County Sheriff in 2010, Tenney decided to run for his Assembly seat. She defeated Oneida County Legislator George Joseph in the September Republican primary and was unopposed in the November general election, becoming the first woman to represent the district.

Tenney represented the 115th Assembly District from 2011 to 2013 and the 101st Assembly District from 2013 to 2017. In 2011, Tenney voted against the Marriage Equality Act. In 2012, Tenney was one of 18 cosponsors of the Internet Protection Act, a bill intended to fight online bullying, which did not pass. Also in 2012, the Conservative Party of New York State gave her an award for being the state's most conservative legislator. She voted against the 2013 gun control law known as the NY SAFE Act, which she called an "assault on upstaters." In 2014, the New York Public Interest Research Group (NYPIRG) claimed Tenney had missed 480 votes, the third-highest number of any assemblymember. WRVO, a National Public Radio affiliate in Oswego, fact-checked NYPIRG's claim and found that she had a 95% attendance record from 2011 to 2016 and had missed 6% of the votes taken during that period.

According to Syracuse.com, "Tenney was a vocal critic of a revenue-sharing deal the Turning Stone Resort Casino in Verona signed with New York state in 2013, in which the Oneida Indian Nation won exclusive rights to run casinos in a 10-county region of Central New York." Later, a Super PAC "with ties to the Oneida Indian nation" opposed her 2014 and 2016 congressional bids. Tenney voted against the 2013 state constitutional amendment that authorized full-fledged casinos on non-Indian lands.

== U.S. House of Representatives ==
=== Elections ===
==== 2014 ====
In 2014, Tenney ran for the Republican nomination for New York's 22nd congressional district, losing the June 24 primary to incumbent Republican Richard L. Hanna by six points, 53% to 47%. Tenney ran to the right of Hanna.

==== 2016 ====
Tenney again sought election to Congress from the 22nd District in the 2016 elections. Hanna retired weeks later, denying that the prospect of a primary rematch with Tenney was a factor. Tenney was endorsed by the Conservative Party of New York State, the pro-life Susan B. Anthony List, the Citizens United Victory Fund, and New Yorkers for Constitutional Freedoms PAC. Hanna did not endorse her.

Tenney won a three-way Republican primary on June 28, 2016. She defeated Democrat Kim Myers and Independent/Reform Party candidate Martin Babinec in the November general election with 44% of the vote to Myers's 39% and Babinec's 13%.

==== 2018 ====
On March 3, 2018, Tenney confirmed that she would seek reelection in 2018. The Democratic Party nominated New York State Assemblymember Anthony Brindisi of nearby Utica, who had served alongside Tenney in the Assembly. Brindisi outraised Tenney, ending the year with $581,851 to Tenney's $573,486. In March 2018, The Hill wrote that Tenney was "embracing President Trump's confrontational style." In August, Trump spoke at a fundraiser for Tenney in Utica, the first time a president had visited the Mohawk Valley in nearly 70 years.

On election night, Brindisi led by 1,293 votes. By November 20, Brindisi's lead grew to over 3,900 votes, exceeding the number of outstanding absentee ballots. On November 21, Tenney told local radio station WUTQ-FM that it was unlikely she would overtake Brindisi, and agreed to help with the transition, but said that she wanted to see every ballot counted. She conceded a week later, on November 28. Her defeat made New York's 22nd congressional district the most pro-Trump congressional district in the nation flipped by a Democrat in 2018.

==== 2020 ====
Tenney sought election to Congress in New York's 22nd congressional district once again in 2020. She won the Republican primary and challenged incumbent Anthony Brindisi in the general election. As of December 2, Tenney held a 12-vote lead in the general election; the race was one of two U.S. House races that remained unresolved. On December 8, a New York state judge ordered a districtwide recanvass of all ballots, including provisional ballots and disputed ballots that were not included in the original count.

On February 5, 2021, Tenney was declared the winner of the election by 109 votes. She appeared to get a boost from former President Donald Trump, who won the district with 54.7% of the vote. She assumed office on February 11, 2021, nearly a month after most of her colleagues were sworn in.

==== 2022 ====
Initial redistricting maps split NY-22 between several different districts. Tenney announced that she would run in the new 23rd district, which covers the western part of the Southern Tier. Although Tenney did not live in that district, she pointed out that her family's business was based in Chenango County. However, the initial redistricting maps were challenged in court and replaced with maps drawn by a special master. Tenney announced that she would instead run in the 24th district, which runs along the Lake Ontario coast; she does not reside in that district either. She won the Republican primary with 54% of the vote, and handily won election in the strongly Republican district with 64% of the vote.

=== Contributors and PACs ===
During the 2021-22 campaign fundraising period, Tenney received $28,750 from the American Israel Public Affairs Committee, a pro-Israel lobbying group, which was her top contributor. During the same period, she received approximately $2 million from a combination of large individual contributions and PACs, accounting for 63.64% of total fundraising. Tenney did not self-finance.

=== Tenure and political positions ===
In a radio interview shortly after the February 2018 Stoneman Douglas High School shooting in Parkland, Florida, Tenney baselessly claimed that "so many of these people that commit the mass murders end up being Democrats". In a follow-up interview, she said, "This problem occurs across all sectors, with all types of people. It isn't just Republicans who commit all these terrible crimes. It is across all sectors and it is people who are typically mentally unstable who are committing a lot of the crimes that we're seeing."

When reports emerged that Secretary of Housing and Urban Development Ben Carson's office had ordered a $31,000 dining room table set with taxpayer funds, Tenney blamed the "deep state" for the expenditure, adding, "I know that Ben Carson did not order that table. It has nothing to do with him. He comes from, you know, poverty."

In March 2017, Tenney voted to reverse the FCC privacy rule that blocked ISPs from selling customer browsing history without customers' permission.

In November 2017, Tenney introduced the No Pensions for Corrupt Politicians Act, which would "close a loophole that has allowed corrupt members of Congress to collect federal pensions after they are convicted of crimes."

In April 2018, Tenney signed a letter calling for criminal investigations into a number of former Obama administration officials and high-ranking Justice Department officials. The letter accused former FBI Director James Comey of leaking classified information, 2016 presidential candidate Hillary Clinton of concealing payments for the Steele Dossier, and Loretta Lynch of threatening whistle-blowers who had anti-Clinton information. The letter also accused former acting attorney general Sally Yates, former deputy FBI director Andrew McCabe, former acting Deputy Attorney General Dana Boente, former senior counterintelligence official Peter Strzok and FBI attorney Lisa Page of criminal wrongdoing.

In March 2021, along with all other Senate and House Republicans, she voted against the American Rescue Plan Act of 2021.

In the fall of 2022, after an attacker fractured the skull of Paul Pelosi, the husband of House Speaker Nancy Pelosi, Tenney and other Republican politicians circulated a baseless allegation that the attacker was a male prostitute. On her Twitter account, Tenney posted a doctored photograph of a group of young men holding hammers next to a gay pride flag and added the comment "LOL".

In September 2024, Tenney sponsored bill H.R. 9495, "Stop Terror-Financing and Tax Penalties on American Hostages Act", which would allow the U.S. Treasury Secretary to designate any nonprofit as a “terrorist supporting organization” and revoke its tax-exempt status. The bill has been opposed by American Civil Liberties Union and other organizations, who have argued that it could be invoked to punish political opponents and stifle free speech.

==== Donald Trump ====
Tenney is an outspoken supporter of Donald Trump.

At a January 5, 2021 rally in Georgia, then-President Trump falsely claimed the votes in Tenney's race against Anthony Brindisi were being counted fraudulently (at the time, the Tenney-Brindisi race was the nation's only uncalled 2020 congressional race). Tenney shared a video of Trump's speech and did not challenge or dispute Trump's false claims.

Tenney condemned the 2021 United States Capitol attack. In February 2021, Tenney said she did not know whether she would have voted to count the electoral votes from the states Biden won in 2020, but that she would have voted against Trump's second impeachment. In May 2021, Tenney said the following about the 2020 presidential election: "'No one knows about what happened in the election... We don’t know if it was stolen or not, (Cheney) doesn’t know, I don’t know, the President doesn’t know. But what I know is we need to fix it'".

In February 2025, Tenney introduced a bill to make Donald Trump's birthday a federal holiday.

==== Healthcare ====
On May 4, 2017, Tenney voted for the American Health Care Act (AHCA), a bill that passed the House of Representatives and died in the Senate. It would have rewritten many regulations of the Affordable Care Act (ACA) and eliminated the individual mandate and federal protections for preexisting conditions in favor of high-risk pools. Tenney also voted for a portion of the AHCA that targeted Medicaid funding by prohibiting Medicaid-related property taxes. The provision applied only to New York State, and only to counties outside of New York City. Tenney argued the overall bill would lower insurance costs, including insurance premiums and related taxes.

In 2021, amid the COVID-19 pandemic, Tenney opposed the Biden administration's vaccine mandate for companies with more than 100 employees, calling it "unconstitutional".

==== Immigration ====
In 2021, Tenney was one of 30 Republicans who voted for the Farm Workforce Modernization Act, which would grant legal status to illegal immigrants working in agriculture and establish a pathway to permanent residency contingent on continued farm work.

==== Environment ====
Tenney was a member of the Climate Solutions Caucus. In 2016, she refuses to accept the scientific consensus on climate change, falsely saying, "The science is not determined. It's not certain." In 2017, she supported President Trump's decision to leave the Paris Agreement.

==== Taxes ====
Tenney voted for the Tax Cuts and Jobs Act of 2017, which Trump signed into law in December 2017. The law's main provisions include a reduction of the top personal income tax rate from 39.6% to 37%, the elimination of the ACA's individual mandate, the limitation of the state and local tax deduction to $10,000 of taxable income, an increase in the standard deduction, and a reduction in the corporate tax rate from 35% to 21%. The reduction of the corporate tax rate is permanent; the personal income tax cuts are temporary. In October 2017, Tenney joined other members of Congress and Ivanka Trump at an event to advocate for doubling the child tax credit; this provision was included in the Tax Cuts and Jobs Act.

==== April 2025 Trip to El Salvador ====
In April 2025, Tenney traveled to El Salvador and received a tour of Centro de Confinamiento del Terrorismo (CECOT), a maximum security prison used by the Trump administration to hold U.S. immigrants forcibly removed from the United States, including immigrants like Kilmar Abrego Garcia who were illegally abducted and transported to the prison. After visiting the CECOT prison camp, Tenney did not call for the repatriation of Kilmar Abrego Garcia.

==== LGBT rights ====
Tenney was one of the 14 co-sponsors of the "Protect Children's Innocence Act", which would make giving transgender minors gender-affirming care a class C felony.

Tenney was the sole member of New York's House delegation to vote against the Respect for Marriage Act, which codified the Supreme Court decision in Obergefell v. Hodges (2015).

==== Gun control ====
In 2017, Tenney co-sponsored legislation that would substantially eliminate National Firearms Act restrictions on obtaining or possessing gun silencers. After the 2017 Las Vegas shooting, she said she still planned to support the bill. In July 2026, Tenney released her "Second Amendment Plan", which calls for opposing additional firearm restrictions and broadening firearm access for law-abiding gun owners. The plan also seeks to challenge what she describes as government overreach in regard to gun policy.

==== Committee memberships ====
- United States House Committee on Ways and Means
- United States House Permanent Select Committee on Intelligence
- United States House Committee on Science, Space, and Technology

==== Caucus memberships ====
- Congressional Caucus on Turkey and Turkish Americans
- Republican Study Committee

== Personal life ==
Tenney is a resident of Cleveland, New York, just inside the boundaries of her congressional district. She and her ex-husband, Wayne Cleary Jr., have one son, Wayne "Trey" Ralph Cleary III. In 2009, the younger Cleary received an appointment to the U.S. Naval Academy. He was commissioned as a second lieutenant in the United States Marine Corps in May 2013.

Tenney is a Presbyterian.

== See also ==
- Women in the United States House of Representatives

New York State Assembly
Preceded by David Townsend	Member of the New York State Assembly from the 115th district 2011–2012	Succeeded by Janet Duprey
Preceded by Kevin A. Cahill	Member of the New York State Assembly from the 101st district 2013–2016	Succeeded by Brian Miller
U.S. House of Representatives
Preceded by Richard L. Hanna	Member of the U.S. House of Representatives from New York's 22nd congressional district 2017–2019	Succeeded by Anthony Brindisi
Preceded by Anthony Brindisi	Member of the U.S. House of Representatives from New York's 22nd congressional district 2021–2023	Succeeded by Brandon Williams
Preceded by John Katko	Member of the U.S. House of Representatives from New York's 24th congressional district 2023–present	Incumbent
U.S. order of precedence (ceremonial)
Preceded by Tom Tiffany	United States representatives by seniority 237th	Succeeded by Ryan Zinke
