= Clifford W. Crouch =

American politician

Member of the New York State Assembly from the 122nd district
- In office November 8, 1995 – January 6, 2021
- Preceded by: Clarence D. Rappleyea Jr.
- Succeeded by: Joe Angelino

Personal details
- Born: May 7, 1945 (age 81) Sidney, New York, U.S.
- Party: Republican
- Spouse: Barbara
- Children: 3
- Education: Cornell University (AAS)

Clifford W. "Cliff" Crouch (born May 7, 1945) is an American businessman, politician, and farmer who served as a member of the New York State Assembly for the 122nd district from 1995 to 2021. He was first elected in 1995 following the resignation of Clarence D. Rappleyea Jr.

== Early life and education ==
Crouch grew up on his parents' farm and graduated from Unadilla High School in 1963. He went on to attend Cornell University and graduated in 1965 with an A.A.S. degree in dairy science.

== Career ==
He was the owner and operator of a 350-acre (1.4 km^{2}), 180-head dairy farm from 1967 until 1989.

=== Politics ===
Crouch served as Town Councilman for the Town of Bainbridge from 1982 to 1986, and Town Supervisor from 1986 until his election to the Assembly in November 1995. While serving in the capacity of Supervisor, Cliff was chairman of the Board of Supervisors in Chenango County, New York from 1993 to November 1995.

In November 1995, he was first elected to the New York State Assembly, following the resignation of Clarence Rappleyea. He first represented the 122nd District until redistricting in 2002, when he took over the 107th District. He ran uncontested in the 2008 and 2010 general elections.

Crouch is currently vice-chairman of the Assembly Minority Conference and a member of five Assembly committees: Agriculture (Ranking Minority Member); Economic Development, Job Creation, Commerce and Industry; Labor; Rules and Ways & Means.

== Personal life ==
Crouch and his wife Barbara reside in the Guilford, New York. They have three children and four grandchildren.

New York State Assembly
| Preceded by Clarence D. Rappleyea, Jr. | New York State Assembly, 122nd District; 1995–2002 | Succeeded by Dierdre Scozzafava |
| Preceded by Robert G. Prentiss | New York State Assembly, 107th District; 2003–present | Incumbent |
