= William Magee (politician) =

American politician (1939–2020)

Member of the New York State Assembly from the 121st district
- In office January 3, 1991 – December 31, 2018
- Preceded by: John McCann
- Succeeded by: John Salka

Personal details
- Born: June 21, 1939 Oneida, New York
- Died: December 24, 2020 (aged 81)
- Party: Democratic
- Spouse: Jeanette
- Profession: Politician

William D. "Bill" Magee (June 21, 1939 – December 24, 2020) was an American member of the New York State Assembly, who represented the 121st Assembly District from 1991 until 2018 as a Democrat.

Magee was a lifetime resident of the Town of Nelson. After graduating from high school, Magee earned a bachelor's degree in agricultural economics from Cornell University in 1961. He then became an auctioneer and businessman in Madison County, New York.

In 1972, Magee was elected to the Madison County Board of Supervisors, serving for 19 years until his election to the State Assembly. He also worked at the New York State Fair from 1985 to 1990.

Magee was first elected to the State Assembly in 1990. He ran uncontested in the 2008 general election and won the 2010 general election with 54 percent of the vote. In 2014 he was re-elected with 52.4 percent of the vote and in 2016 re-elected with 52.37 percent of the vote. He lost re-election in 2018 to John Salka.
