= Daniel L. Feldman =

American politician (born 1949)

Daniel Lee Feldman

Member of the New York State Assembly from the 45th district
- In office January 7, 1981 – December 31, 1998
- Preceded by: Chuck Schumer
- Succeeded by: Lena Cymbrowitz

Personal details
- Born: Daniel Feldman; June 22, 1949 Rockaway, Queens, U.S.
- Party: Democratic
- Spouse: Cecilia Gardner (m. 1989)
- Children: Two
- Education: Columbia University, Harvard Law School
- Profession: Professor

Daniel Lee Feldman (born June 22, 1949) is an American lawyer, author, politician and professor at John Jay College of Criminal Justice. He was a member of the New York State Assembly from 1981 to 1998, representing the 45th Assembly District, which includes part of Manhattan Beach, Brighton Beach and Sheepshead Bay. In 2016, Feldman was elected as a fellow for the National Academy of Public Administration.

== Education ==
After graduating from Far Rockaway High School in 1966, Feldman received his undergraduate B.A. degree in economics from Columbia University in 1970, where he was also a member of the inaugural class of New York City Urban Fellows in 1969-1970. He holds a J.D. from Harvard Law School.

== Political career ==
After starting his career in securities litigation Feldman became executive assistant to then-Congresswoman Elizabeth Holtzman in 1974, and in 1977, he was named investigations counsel to then-New York State Assemblyman Charles Schumer. When Schumer pursued a seat in Congress in 1980, Feldman ran for and won election to Schumer's former legislative seat in the 45th District of New York with 76 percent of the vote.

During his time in the New York State Legislature, Feldman wrote more than 140 laws, including New York's Megan's Law and Organized Crime Control Act. Feldman also served as Correction Committee chair for 12 years, where he led some of the first efforts to repeal the Rockefeller Drug Laws. Laws Feldman wrote established the New York City Transit Corps of Engineers and the Tax Assessment Small Claims Court. Other legislation Feldman introduced addressed gun licensing, parking violations, environmental protection, protection of the elderly, information privacy and criminal justice reform.

In 1998, Feldman participated in the Democratic primary for Congress from New York's 9th congressional district, which was again being vacated by Schumer, who was running for a seat in the U.S. Senate. In the district's hotly contested, four-person primary election, Feldman ultimately lost to eventual Congressman – and fellow former Schumer aide – Anthony Weiner.

After the primary, Feldman served as a senior member of then-New York State Attorney General Eliot Spitzer's staff for six years and as special counsel for law and policy to New York state Comptroller Thomas DiNapoli.

== Career in education ==
Feldman has taught at least part-time since 1977, focusing on law, government, and political philosophy at a number of universities in the northeastern United States, and lectured on jurisprudence at Oxford University in 1982 and 1990. He currently teaches oversight & investigation, ethics & accountability, and administrative law at John Jay College of Criminal Justice in New York City.

== Works ==
=== Books ===
- Administrative Law: The Sources and Limits of Government Agency Power (1st ed. 2015). ISBN 9781506308548
- The Art of the Watchdog: Fighting Fraud, Waste, Abuse, and Corruption in Government (1st ed. 2014). ISBN 1-438-44929-1
- Tales from the Sausage Factory: Making Laws in New York State (1st ed. 2010). ISBN 1-438-43401-4
- New York Criminal Law (1st ed. 1995). ISBN 1-4384-4930-5
- The Logic of American Government: Applying the Constitution to the Contemporary World (1st ed. 1990). ISBN 0-688-08134-7
- Reforming Government (1st ed. 1981). ISBN 0-68800-349-4

=== Podcasts ===
- A Good Run with Daniel Feldman

New York State Assembly
Preceded by Charles Schumer	New York State Assembly; 45th District; 1981–1998	Succeeded by Lena Cymbrowitz
