= Cymbrowitz =

Cymbrowitz is a surname. Notable people with the surname include:

- Steven Cymbrowitz (born 1953), American politician, husband of Lena
- Lena Cymbrowitz (1957–2000), American politician
