= Joey Cohen-Saban =

American politician

- Cohen-Saban in 2025

Member-elect of the New York State Assembly from the 45th district
- Assuming office January 2027
- Succeeding: Michael Novakhov

Personal details
- Born: Brooklyn, New York City, U.S.
- Party: Democratic
- Spouse: Florence
- Children: 2

Joey Cohen-Saban is an American politician. He is the Democratic member-elect of the New York State Assembly from the 45th district, defeating incumbent Michael Novakhov. Prior to his election, he was chief of staff to state senator Sam Sutton.

== Biography ==
Cohen-Saban, a first-generation Jewish American of Sephardic descent, was born and raised in South Brooklyn, and attended the Yeshivah of Flatbush and George Washington University. He served as chief of staff to state senator Sam Sutton.

Cohen-Saban started his campaign for New York's 45th State Assembly district in the 2024 election, shortly after Michael Novakhov flipped the seat for the Republicans. this was his first run for State Assembly. Seeing low turnout among the Jewish community and a lack of name recognition as initial challenges to a potential victory, he knocked on doors to engage potential voters, and received support from Rodneyse Bichotte Hermelyn. He narrowly lost to Novakhov, though he expressed surprise at the margin during his election night party in Bay Ridge Manor.

During the 2025 New York City mayoral election, Cohen-Saban opposed Zohran Mamdani's subsequently-successful campaign. In August 2026, Cohen-Saban shared a letter calling for a Brooklyn Democratic district leader to resign over antisemitic comments related to deed theft in the borough. He also supported Nikki Lucas' bid for chair of the Brooklyn Democratic Party.

Cohen-Saban ran again in 2026 in a rematch with Novakhov, with key issues on his campaign including antisemitism, yeshiva funding, and public safety. His election night party was held in a kosher restaurant, with attendees including Assembly Members Bichotte Hermelyn, Sam Berger and Nily Rozic, and New York City Council Member Mercedes Narcisse. He won the race with 62% of the vote, unseating Novakhov.

Cohen-Saban has two children with his wife Florence.
