= Manhattan Beach Jewish Center =

Orthodox synagogue in Brooklyn, New York

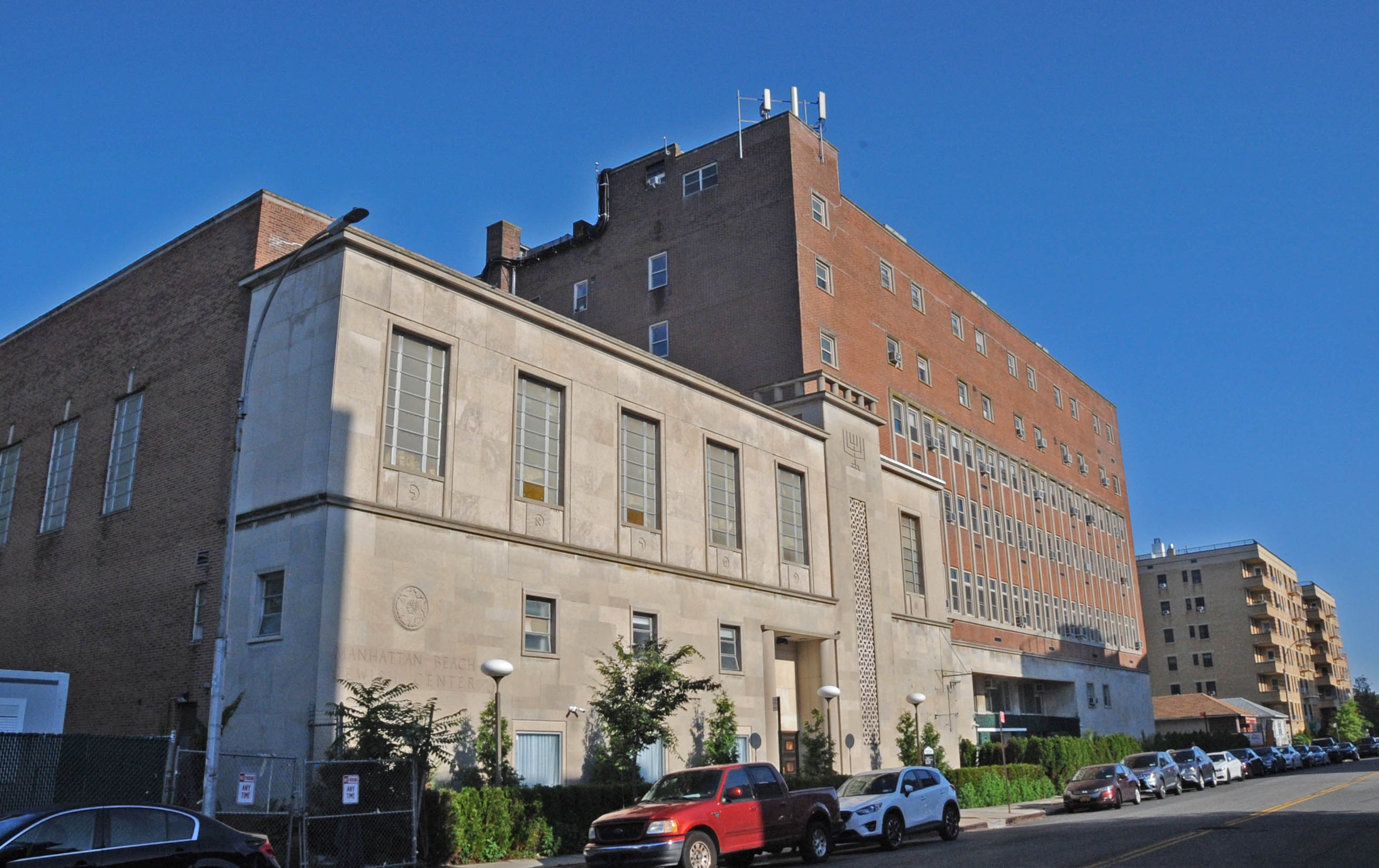
- The synagogue building, in 2017

- Location in New York City

Religion
- Affiliation: Orthodox Judaism
- Ecclesiastical or organisational status: Synagogue
- Leadership: Rabbi Akiva Eisenstadt (Rabbi) Andrew Birnbaum (President) Moshe Singer (Gabbai)
- Status: Active

Location
- Location: 60 West End Avenue, Brooklyn, New York City
- State: New York
- Country: United States
- Coordinates: 40°34′50″N 73°57′22″W

Architecture
- Architect: Jacob W. Sherman
- Type: Synagogue architecture
- Style: Bauhaus; Modernist
- Established: 1922 (as a congregation)
- Completed: 1952; 1961

Specifications
- Capacity: 600
- Materials: Limestone; brick; Akoustolith tiles

Website
- mbjc.org
- Manhattan Beach Jewish Center
- U.S. National Register of Historic Places
- New York State Register of Historic Places
- Area: 1.03 acres (0.42 ha)
- NRHP reference No.: 15000266
- NYSRHP No.: 04701.015326

Significant dates
- Added to NRHP: May 26, 2015
- Designated NYSRHP: April 1, 2015

The Manhattan Beach Jewish Center is an Orthodox Jewish active congregation, synagogue, and community center, located in the Manhattan Beach neighborhood of Brooklyn in New York City, New York, United States.

== History ==
Founded as Congregation B’nai Israel of Manhattan Beach in 1922, the congregation started calling itself as the Manhattan Beach Jewish Center shortly thereafter; however it did not apply to formally change its name until 1962.

Located at 60 West End Avenue, the historic synagogue building was completed in 1952. It was designed by Jacob W. Sherman in the Bauhaus style, similar to European synagogues of the 1930s. Ten years after the synagogue was opened, the adjoining seven-story community center was built. The first Jewish community center was formed in 1917 in Manhattan, beginning a community centre movement. The Jewish Center of Brooklyn followed shortly thereafter, with a center that housed a gymnasium, kindergarten, library, classrooms, dining room and synagogue. The building is an example of the Jewish community center movement which was coming into its own at the time.

The synagogue is a two-story-and-mezzanine Modern Movement building with a limestone façade and granite base. It has a short tower and recessed shallow entrance porch, flanked on either side by a single unadorned column.

During Superstorm Sandy, the Center experienced serious damage. NYS Assemblyman Steven Cymbrowitz reported witnessing 350,000 US gallons (1,300,000 litres) of water and oil being pumped out of the basement. Two years after the storm, the center was still recovering.

The synagogue building and community center was listed on the National Register of Historic Places in 2015, one of only two properties in all of New York City to be nominated for the distinction by then-Governor Andrew Cuomo, to both the State and National Registers of Historic Places.
