= Lena Cymbrowitz =

American politician

Member of the New York State Assembly from the 45th district
- In office January 1, 1999 – August 21, 2000
- Preceded by: Daniel L. Feldman
- Succeeded by: Steven Cymbrowitz

Personal details
- Born: Lena Azizo; January 1, 1957 Egypt
- Died: August 21, 2000 (aged 43) New York City
- Party: Democratic
- Spouse: Steven Cymbrowitz
- Children: Jay, Jennifer
- Profession: Politician

Lena Cymbrowitz (January 1, 1957 – August 21, 2000) was an American politician who served as a Democratic member of the New York State Assembly. She represented Assembly District 45, which included the Brooklyn communities of Flatbush, Midwood, Sheepshead Bay, Manhattan Beach, Gerritsen Beach, and a portion of Brighton Beach.

== Early life, family, and education ==
Cymbrowitz (née Azizo) was born in Egypt and came to the United States with her parents, Albert Azizo and Lilianne Tawil Tawil Azizo. She had a Bachelor's degree in English Literature. Prior to her election, she worked in fundraising and marketing.

== Career ==
In November 1998, following a New York Times endorsement in a September primary, Cymbrowitz was elected in the 45th District's general election to the New York State Assembly. She received over 70% of the votes cast and replaced former Assemblyman Daniel Feldman. This made her the first Sephardic Jew ever elected to state office. She died in 2000, serving less than one term in office. The Lena Cymbrowitz Distinguished Legislator Award was named in her memory. While in office, she had advocated for increasing monies allocated for mammographs.

== Personal life ==
Cymbrowitz had two children (Jay and Jennifer) with her husband, Steven Cymbrowitz. She died on August 21, 2000, after a long battle with cancer.

New York State Assembly
Preceded by Daniel L. Feldman	New York State Assembly; 45th District; 1999–2000	Succeeded by Steven Cymbrowitz
