= The Leon M. Goldstein High School for the Sciences =

Public school in New York City

Coordinates: 40°34′50″N 73°56′06″W

Leon M. Goldstein High School for the Sciences

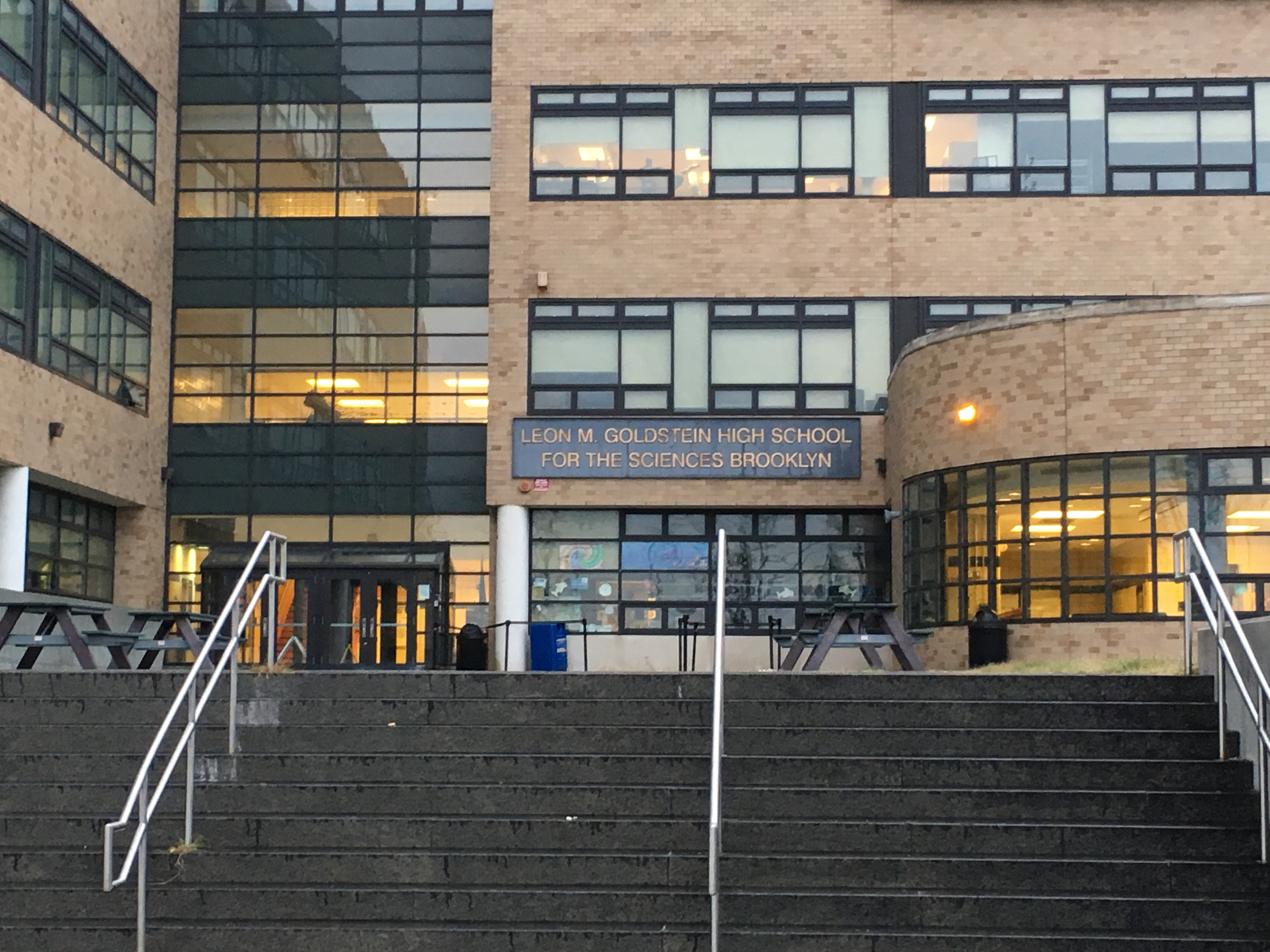

Location
- 1830 Shore Boulevard; Brooklyn, NY 11235; United States

Information
- Type: Public School; Screened Admissions
- Motto: "Academic Excellence in a Caring Community"
- Established: September 1993; building opened September 2002
- School district: Region 6 - District 22
- School number: K535
- Principal: Scott Hughes
- Faculty: ≈ 80
- Grades: 9-12
- Colors: Purple and White
- Mascot: Dolphin
- Nickname: LMG
- Newspaper: The Goldstein Amicus
- Affiliations: Kingsborough Community College, C.U.N.Y
- Website: lmghs.org

The Leon M. Goldstein High School for the Sciences at Kingsborough Community College, CUNY, formerly Kingsborough High School for the Sciences at Kingsborough Community College, CUNY from 1993 to 1999) is a four-year high school (grades 9-12), located in Manhattan Beach, Brooklyn, New York. Leon M. Goldstein High School is screened-admission public school under the administration of the New York City Department of Education.

LMGHS is located on the northern part of the campus of Kingsborough Community College of the City University of New York; it overlooks Sheepshead Bay. LMGHS was opened in September 1993 by Mayor David Dinkins and President of Kingsborough Community College Leon M. Goldstein. Goldstein supported the idea for starting a high school at Kingsborough Community College and the high school was later renamed in Goldstein's honor. The high school's first class graduated in June 1997.

The high school has a partnership with Kingsborough Community College, and is able to use many of its facilities including the gymnasium, auditorium, and some laboratories. Like many high schools in New York City, LMGHS offers College Now programs and a Bridge Program, enabling high school students to take some college courses and earn college credits from CUNY.

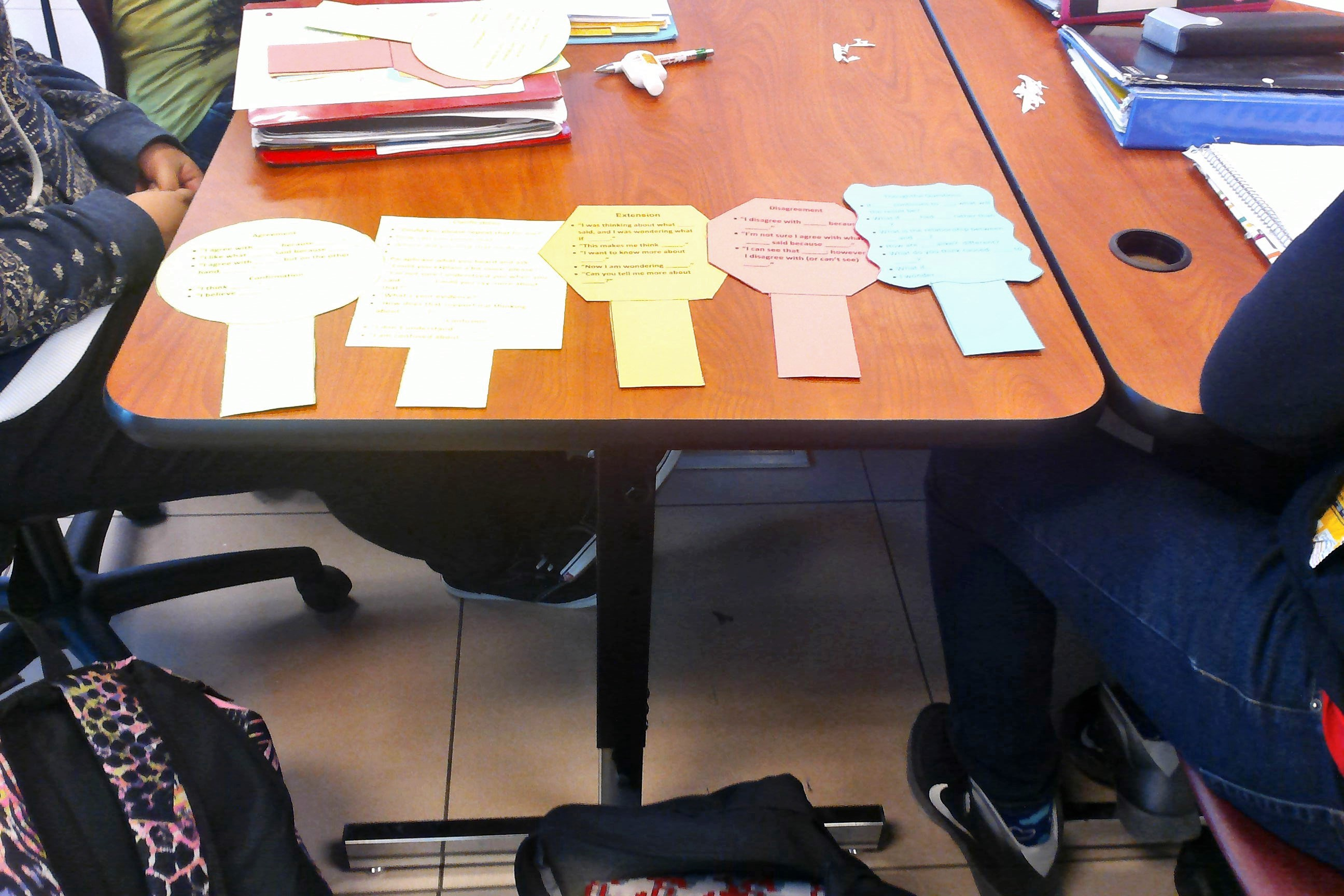
LMG Socratic Seminar discussion paddles

== Demographics ==
The school has approximately 1,000 students, making it smaller than most other NYC public high schools.

As of the 2020/2021 school year, the school has a 57% female, 43% male gender balance. The racial makeup of the school is approximately 9% of the student body are Black, 10% are Hispanic, 26% are Asian, 52% are white, and 3% identify as multiracial. 52% of the student body is classified as economically disadvantaged with 1% of the student body also classified as homeless.

== Requirements for graduation ==
In order to qualify for a diploma, students must complete four years of English, science, social studies, mathematics, physical education, and elective classes; a total of 44 credits are required for graduation. In addition, students are required to complete at least one year of foreign language; one credit each of music and art are also required. These requirements are the same as most other NYC public high schools.

A New York State Regents Diploma is given to students who pass the Regents Examinations in English, global history, American history, algebra, geometry, advanced algebra, trigonometry, biology, chemistry, and physics and who complete three years of a foreign language. Students who have completed a minimum of nine semesters (9 credits) of arts study, along with a rigorous assessment of their art form, including passing the visual arts or music Regents Examination, will also earn the NYC Chancellor's Arts Endorsed Diploma.

== Technology ==
All classrooms in Goldstein are also equipped with Smart Boards, consistent with most other high schools in New York City.

In 2015, the school’s computer science students participated in a partnership with the advertising agency Young & Rubicam.

The school maintains a small art collection that includes Freedom of Artistic Expression by Frank Herbert Mason, Genius by Ralph Helmick and Stu Schechter.

== Athletics ==
Leon M. Goldstein High School fields varsity teams in several sports, including basketball, swimming, bowling, soccer, wrestling, tennis, volleyball, handball, and golf. The school's cheerleading squad known as the "Boosters". The teams are collectively nicknamed the LMG "Dolphins".

== Notable alumni ==
- Phillipe Nover
