= Calvin Ward =

Calvin Ward may refer to:

- Calvin John Ward (1899–1967), United States Army National Guard soldier and Medal of Honor recipient
- Calvin Edouard Ward (1925–2018), American pianist, music theorist and educator
- Calvin Ward, prospector and namesake of Ward, Colorado
