= Tessa Bailey =

American author

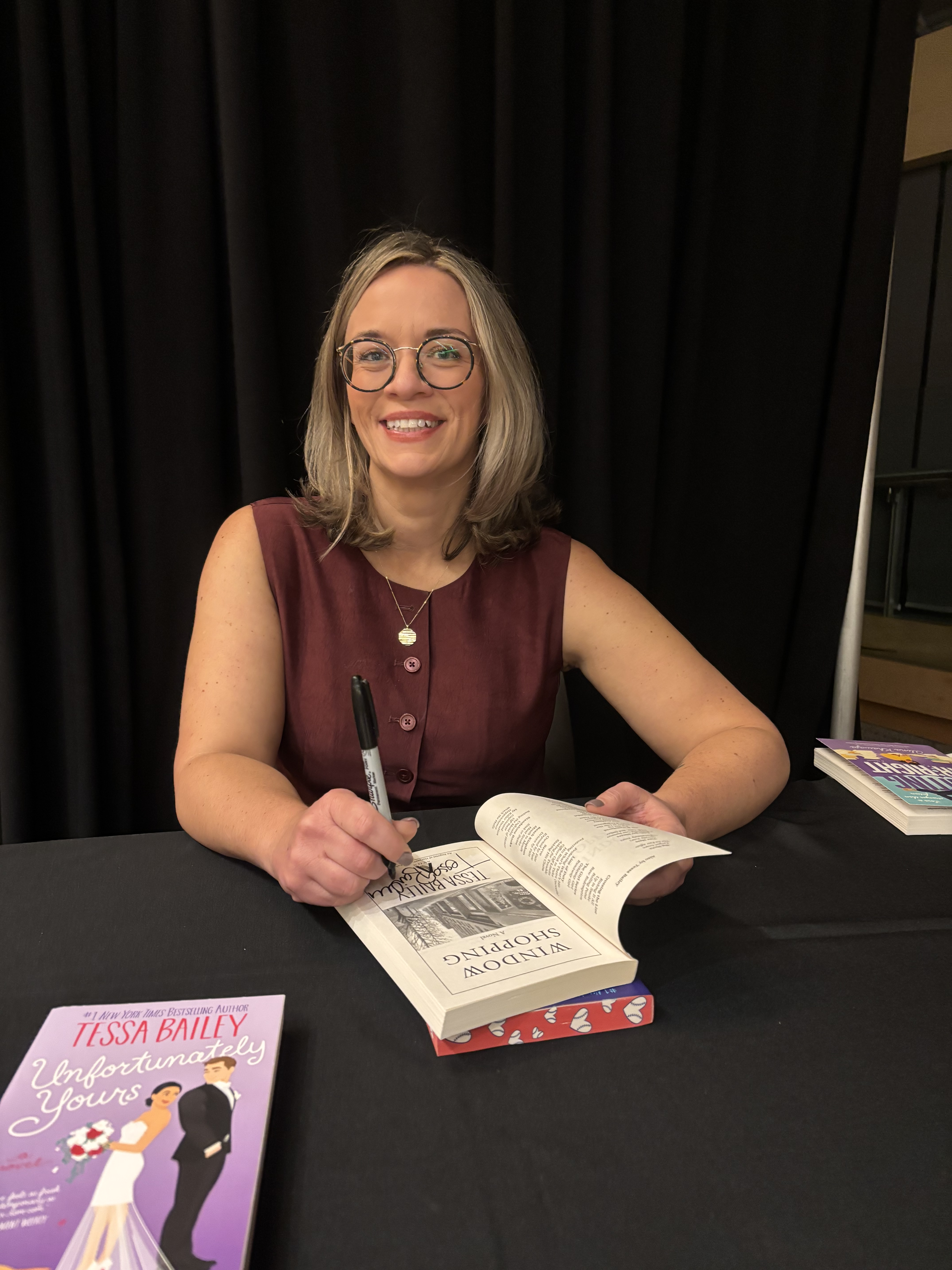
Tessa Bailey in 2025

Tessa Bailey is an American author of romance fiction.

== Biography ==
Tessa Bailey is from Carlsbad, California. She attended Kingsborough Community College and studied English at Pace University.

Bailey writes romance fiction. Her novel Fix Her Up (Avon, 2019) received a starred review from Publishers Weekly. Her novel It Happened One Summer (Avon, 2021) received a starred review from Kirkus Reviews. Hook, Line and Sinker (Avon, 2022) was a New York Times bestseller, as was Unfortunately Yours (Avon, 2023).

Bailey is married and has a daughter. She lives on Long Island, New York.

== Selected works ==
=== The Academy series ===
- Disorderly Conduct. Avon, 2017.
- Indecent Exposure. Avon, 2018.
- Disturbing His Peace. Avon, 2018.

=== Bellinger Sisters series ===
- It Happened One Summer. Avon, 2021.
- Hook, Line and Sinker. Avon, 2022.

=== Broke and Beautiful series ===
- Chase Me. Avon, 2015.
- Need Me. Avon, 2015.
- Make Me. Avon, 2015.

=== Crossing the Line series ===
- Risking It All. Entangled Publishing: Select, 2015.
- Up in Smoke. Entangled Publishing: Select, 2015.
- Boiling Point. Entangled Publishing: Select, 2016.
- Raw Redemption. Entangled Publishing: Select, 2016.

=== Hot and Hammered series ===
- Fix Her Up. Avon, 2019.
- Love Her or Lose Her. Avon, 2019.
- Tools of Engagement. Avon, 2020.

=== Romancing the Clarksons series ===
- Too Hot to Handle. Forever, 2016.
- Too Wild to Tame. Forever, 2017.
- Too Hard to Forget. Forever, 2017.
- Too Beautiful to Break. Forever, 2017.

=== A Vine Mess series ===
- Secretly Yours. Avon, 2022.
- Unfortunately Yours. Avon, 2023.

=== Big Shots series ===
- Fangirl Down. Avon, 2024.
- The Au Pair Affair. Avon, 2024.
- Dream Girl Drama. Avon, 2025.
- Pitcher Perfect. Avon, 2025.
- Catch Her If You Can. Avon, 2026.

=== Standalone books ===
- Window Shopping. Avon, 2021.
- My Killer Vacation. Avon, 2022.
- Wreck the Halls. Avon, 2023.
- Broken Rival. Avon, 2026.
