= Leon Goldstein =

Educational leader

Leon M. Goldstein
- Born: 1932 or 1933; Borough Park, Brooklyn, New York
- Died: January 8, 1999 (aged 66)
- Monuments: Leon M. Goldstein High School for the Sciences; Leon M. Goldstein Performing Arts Center
- Education: City College of New York (B.A.); Brooklyn College (M.A.)
- Occupation: college administrator
- Known for: President of Kingsborough Community College, and acting Chancellor of the City University of New York

Leon M. Goldstein (died January 8, 1999) was a college administrator, President of Kingsborough Community College, and acting Chancellor of the City University of New York. The Leon M. Goldstein High School for the Sciences and the Leon M. Goldstein Performing Arts Center are both named in his honor.

== Early life and education ==
Goldstein was born in Borough Park, Brooklyn, to Jewish immigrants from Poland. He received his B.A. from City College of New York, and his M.A. from Brooklyn College.

== Career ==
Goldstein taught and was ultimately a professor of history, dean of faculty, and Vice President at New York City Community College from 1960 to 1971.

Goldstein was President of Kingsborough Community College from 1971 to 1999. In 1981 he was also Deputy Chancellor of the City University of New York.

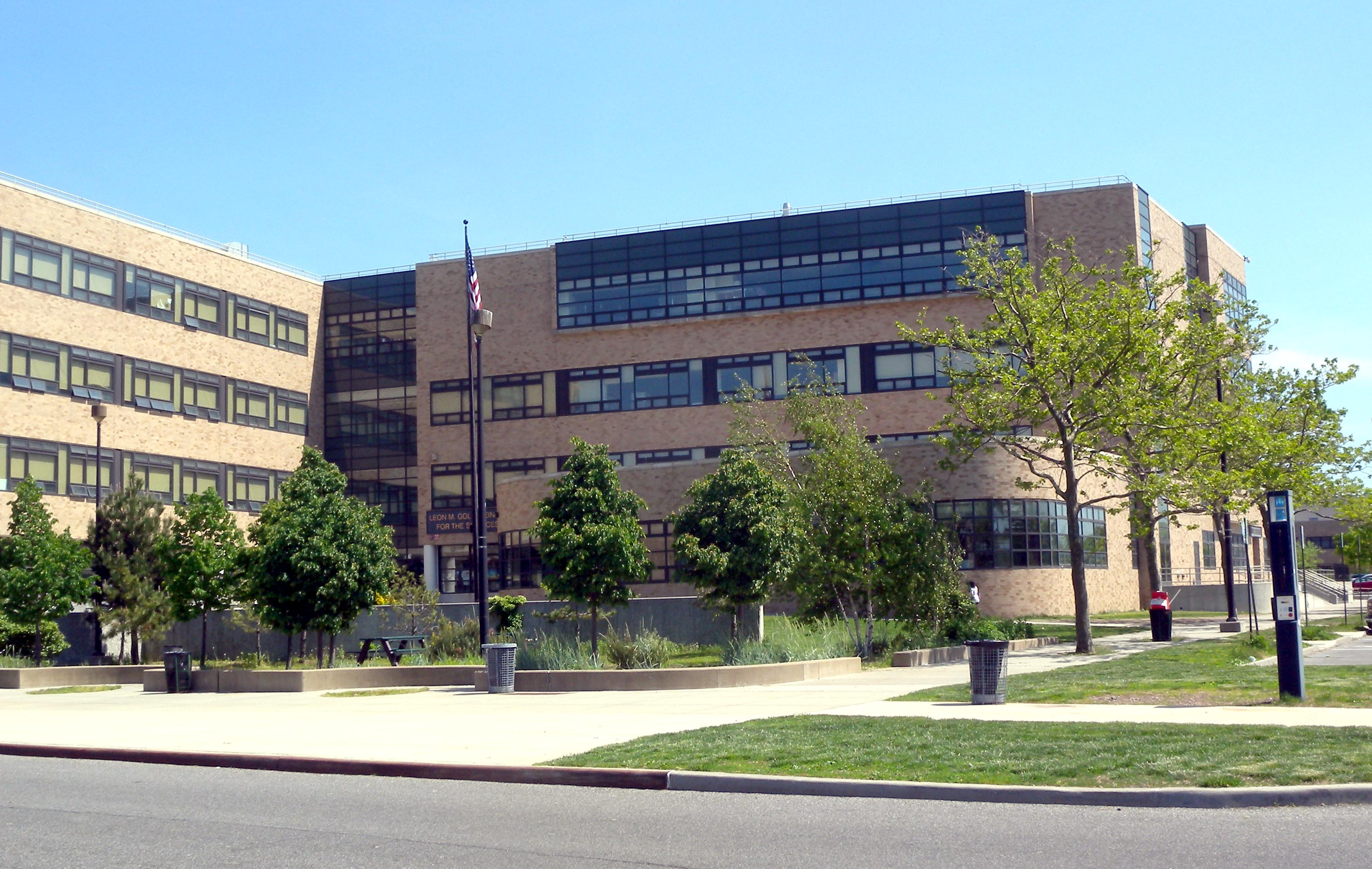
The Leon M. Goldstein High School for the Sciences

Goldstein was acting Chancellor of the City University of New York from July 1982 to September 1982, during which time he took a leave of absence from his position as President of Kingsborough Community College. He also served as CUNY's Dean for Community Colleges. He was Vice President of the Middle States Association of Colleges and Secondary Schools in 1994.

Goldstein died at his home in Manhattan on January 8, 1999, at the age of 66.

The Leon M. Goldstein High School for the Sciences in Brooklyn, New York, was named in his honor. The 743-seat Leon M. Goldstein Performing Arts Center at Kingsborough was also named in his honor.
