= New York's 45th State Assembly district =

American legislative district

Assemblymember
Michael Novakhov; R–Manhattan Beach

New York's 45th State Assembly district is one of the 150 districts in the New York State Assembly. It has been represented by Michael Novakhov since 2023, defeating then-incumbent Steven Cymbrowitz.

== Geography ==
=== 2010s-present ===
District 45 is located in Brooklyn, comprising portions of Midwood, Manhattan Beach, Brighton Beach, Gravesend, and Sheepshead Bay.

The district overlaps (partially) with New York's 8th and 9th congressional districts, the 17th, 22nd and 23rd districts of the New York State Senate, and the 43rd, 44th, 47th and 48th districts of the New York City Council.

== Recent election results ==
=== 2026 ===
2026 New York State Assembly election, District 45
Party	Candidate	Votes	%
Republican	Michael Novakhov		
Conservative	Michael Novakhov		
Total	Michael Novakhov (incumbent)		
Democratic	Joey Cohen-Saban		
Fight Antisemitism	Joey Cohen-Saban		
Total	Joey Cohen-Saban		
Write-in			
Total votes			100.0

=== 2024 ===
2024 New York State Assembly election, District 45
Party	Candidate	Votes	%
Republican	Michael Novakhov	14,060	
Conservative	Michael Novakhov	1,323	
Total	Michael Novakhov (incumbent)	15,383	50.1
Democratic	Joey Cohen-Saban	15,151	49.4
Write-in		138	0.5
Total votes		30,672	100.0
Republican hold			

=== 2022 ===
2022 New York State Assembly election, District 45
Party	Candidate	Votes	%
Republican	Michael Novakhov	12,936	
Conservative	Michael Novakhov	821	
Total	Michael Novakhov	13,757	59.7
Democratic	Steven Cymbrowitz	8,451	
Independence	Steven Cymbrowitz	807	
Total	Steven Cymbrowitz (incumbent)	9,258	40.2
Write-in		16	0.1
Total votes		23,031	100.0
Republican gain from Democratic			

=== 2020 ===
2020 New York State Assembly election, District 45
Party	Candidate	Votes	%
Democratic	Steven Cymbrowitz	16,808	
Working Families	Steven Cymbrowitz	5,252	
Independence	Steven Cymbrowitz	1,410	
Total	Steven Cymbrowitz (incumbent)	23,470	98.7
Write-in		310	1.3
Total votes		23,780	100.0
Democratic hold			

=== 2018 ===
2018 New York State Assembly election, District 45
Party	Candidate	Votes	%
Democratic	Steven Cymbrowitz	12,024	
Independence	Steven Cymbrowitz	1,226	
Working Families	Steven Cymbrowitz	946	
Women's Equality	Steven Cymbrowitz	105	
Total	Steven Cymbrowitz (incumbent)	14,301	98.8
Write-in		179	1.2
Total votes		14,480	100.0
Democratic hold			

=== 2016 ===
2016 New York State Assembly election, District 45
Party	Candidate	Votes	%
Democratic	Steven Cymbrowitz	15,768	
Working Families	Steven Cymbrowitz	1,208	
Independence	Steven Cymbrowitz	919	
Total	Steven Cymbrowitz (incumbent)	17,895	79.1
Conservative	Boris Gintchanski	4,692	20.7
Write-in		46	0.2
Total votes		22,633	100.0
Democratic hold			

=== 2014 ===
2014 New York State Assembly election, District 45
Primary election
Party	Candidate	Votes	%
Democratic	Steven Cymbrowitz (incumbent)	2,267	56.0
Democratic	Ben Akselrod	1,763	43.5
Write-in		21	0.5
Total votes		4,051	100.0
Republican	Ben Akselrod	46	39.3
Write-in		44	37.6
Republican	Steven Cymbrowitz (incumbent)	27	23.1
Total votes		117	100.0
General election
Democratic	Steven Cymbrowitz	5,823	
Working Families	Steven Cymbrowitz	410	
Independence	Steven Cymbrowitz	248	
Total	Steven Cymbrowitz (incumbent)	6,481	54.8
Republican	Ben Akselrod	4,943	41.8
Conservative	Mikhail Usher	393	3.3
Write-in		20	0.1
Total votes		11,837	100.0
Democratic hold			

=== 2012 ===
2012 New York State Assembly election, District 45
Primary election
Party	Candidate	Votes	%
Democratic	Steven Cymbrowitz (incumbent)	1,922	54.0
Democratic	Ben Akselrod	1,628	45.7
Write-in		9	0.3
Total votes		3,559	100.0
Independence	Ben Akselrod	16	44.4
Independence	Russell Gallo	13	36.1
Independence	Steven Cymbrowitz (incumbent)	5	13.9
Write-in		2	5.6
Total votes		36	100.0
General election
Democratic	Steven Cymbrowitz	10,990	
Working Families	Steven Cymbrowitz	869	
Total	Steven Cymbrowitz (incumbent)	11,859	55.0
Republican	Russell Gallo	5,008	
Conservative	Russell Gallo	509	
Total	Russell Gallo	5,517	25.6
Independence	Ben Akselrod	4,151	19.3
Write-in		32	0.1
Total votes		21,559	100.0
Democratic win (new boundaries)			

=== 2010 ===
2010 New York State Assembly election, District 45
Party	Candidate	Votes	%
Democratic	Steven Cymbrowitz	8,808	
Working Families	Steven Cymbrowitz	595	
Total	Steven Cymbrowitz (incumbent)	9,403	57.8
Republican	Joseph Hayon	5,848	
Conservative	Joseph Hayon	827	
School Choice	Joseph Hayon	185	
Total	Joseph Hayon	6,860	42.2
Write-in		8	0.0
Total votes		16,271	100.0
Democratic hold			

=== 2008 ===
2008 New York State Assembly election, District 45
Party	Candidate	Votes	%
Democratic	Steven Cymbrowitz	11,015	
Republican	Steven Cymbrowitz	10,320	
Working Families	Steven Cymbrowitz	538	
Total	Steven Cymbrowitz (incumbent)	21,873	100.0
Write-in		2	0.0
Total votes		21,875	100.0
Democratic hold			

=== 2006 ===
2006 New York State Assembly election, District 45
Party	Candidate	Votes	%
Democratic	Steven Cymbrowitz	8,453	
Republican	Steven Cymbrowitz	3,914	
Total	Steven Cymbrowitz (incumbent)	12,367	100.0
Write-in		0	0.0
Total votes		12,367	100.0
Democratic hold			

=== 2004 ===
2004 New York State Assembly election, District 45
Party	Candidate	Votes	%
Democratic	Steven Cymbrowitz (incumbent)	16,073	66.9
Republican	Arthur Gershfeld	7,142	
Conservative	Arthur Gershfeld	568	
Total	Arthur Gershfeld	7,710	32.1
Independence	Paul Gouldin	244	1.0
Write-in		0	0.0
Total votes		24,027	100.0
Democratic hold			

=== 2002 ===
2002 New York State Assembly election, District 45
Party	Candidate	Votes	%
Democratic	Steven Cymbrowitz	10,067	
Working Families	Steven Cymbrowitz	339	
Total	Steven Cymbrowitz (incumbent)	10,406	78.0
Republican	Theodore Alatsas	2,681	
Conservative	Theodore Alatsas	258	
Total	Theodore Alatsas	2,939	22.0
Write-in		3	0.0
Total votes		13,348	100.0
Democratic win (new boundaries)			

=== 2000 ===
2000 New York State Assembly election, District 45
Party	Candidate	Votes	%
Democratic	Steven Cymbrowitz	18,514	75.0
Republican	Fred Fields	4,516	
Conservative	Fred Fields	708	
Total	Fred Fields	5,224	21.2
Write-in		956	3.9
Total votes		24,694	100.0
Democratic hold			

=== Federal results in Assembly District 45 ===
Year	Office	Results
2024	President	Trump 74.2 - 24.4%
2024	Senate	Sapraicone 70.5 - 28.8%
2022	Senate	Pinion 70.3 – 29.7%
2020	President	Trump 65.5 – 33.5%
2018	Senate	Farley 51.7 – 48.3%
2016	President	Trump 58.6 – 38.9%
2016	Senate	Schumer 66.3 – 33.7%
2012	President	Romney 59.5 – 39.5%
2012	Senate	Gillibrand 58.8 – 39.8%
