= Craig Drennen =

American artist

- Born: 1966 (age 59–60); Elyria, Ohio
- Education: Ohio University, Skowhegan School of Painting and Sculpture, Glenville State University
- Known for: Artist, Painting, Performance, Sculpture, Video
- Awards: Guggenheim Fellowship

Craig Drennen (born 1966) is an American artist based in Atlanta, Georgia. He is best known for his ongoing long-term Timon of Athens project, for which he has produced paintings, drawings, prints, videos, performances, sculptures. His work shows technical agility across a wide range of influences that spans abstraction, representation, and conceptual practices. In a catalog essay, the curator Diana Nawi writes that Drennen's "…multifaceted, dense, and ambitious practice suggests a world of meaning defined by symbols that emerge in different media and coalesce across projects."

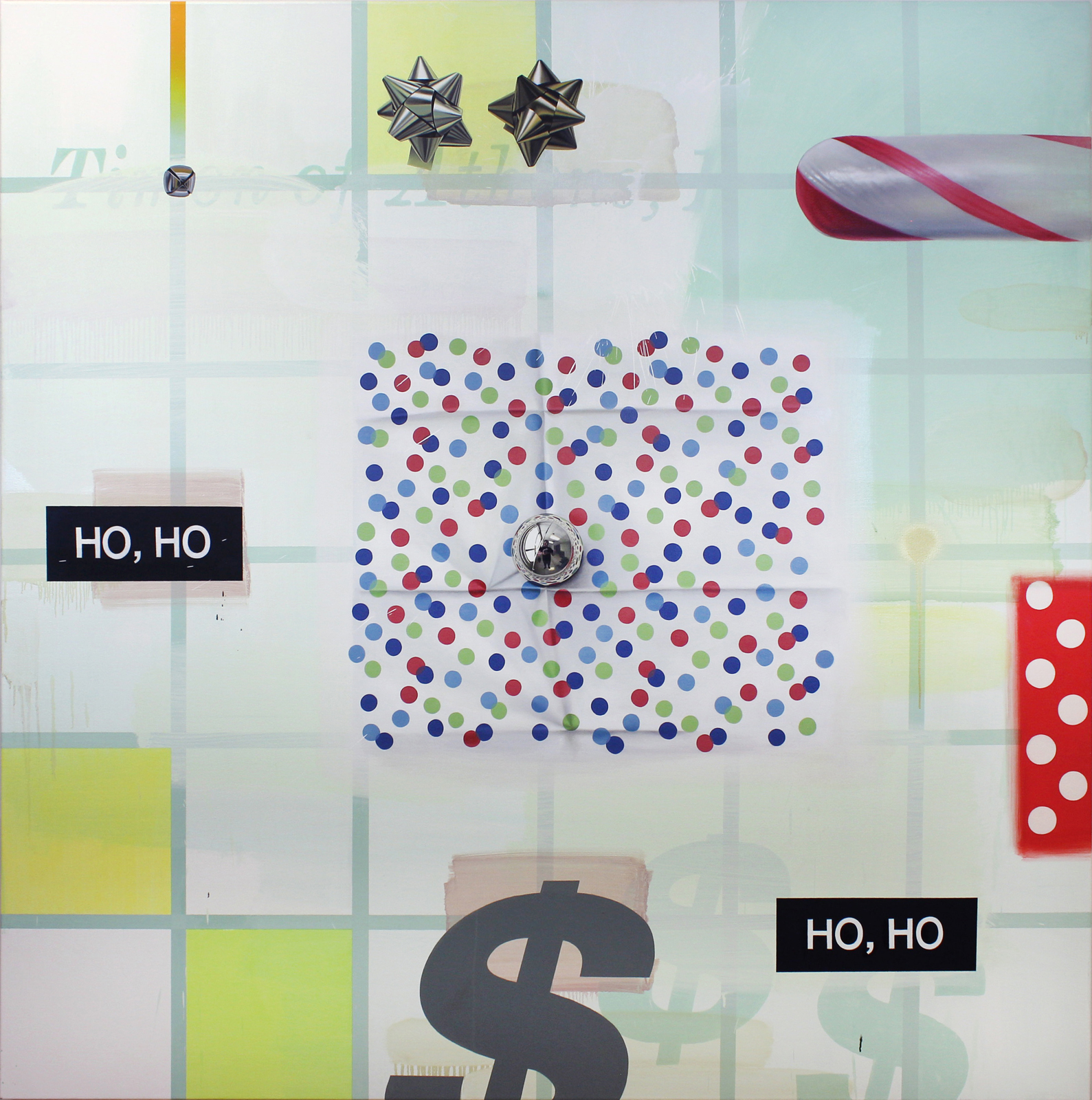
Craig Drennen, BANDIT 4, oil & alkyd on canvas, 72" X 72", 2017

== Early life ==
Craig Drennen was born in Elyria, Ohio, and raised in central West Virginia. He accumulated academic accolades in West Virginia, but little of his early life is documented. He graduated from Glenville State College (WV) and Ohio University (OH) with an MFA in Painting & Art History. He was a 2006 participant at the Skowhegan School of Painting & Sculpture.

== Career ==
Craig Drennen lived in New York City for much of the 1990s where he worked as an art handler at the Guggenheim Museum, National Academy Museum, and International Center for Photography among places. He shared a studio on west 27th Street and produced artwork that he showed with Sarah Meltzer Gallery, Christinerose Gallery, and Momenta Art. He taught courses at the School of Visual Arts, Long Island University, and Kingsborough Community College. He worked at different times for the artists Keith Sonnier and Sandy Skoglund. He assisted Clarissa Dalrymple and managed her booth in the first Gramercy Art Fair at the Gramercy Hotel in 1994. He began writing art criticism for New York Arts and Cover magazines. He was a teaching artist at the Dia Center for the Arts in Chelsea then accepted a position as the Dia education coordinator in 1998.

Drennen relocated to Georgia in fall 1999 and began to participate in artist residencies for the first time. In December 2002 he was awarded a residency at the Vermont Studio Center where he began what would be his first long-term, multi-year artistic project based on the failed 1984 movie Supergirl. He worked for nearly six years on the Supergirl project and produced drawings, paintings, sculptural multiples, and audio pieces. He showed the Supergirl work in at least four solo gallery exhibitions and it marks the first mature body of work in his career.

In 2008 Drennen began his Timon of Athens project. Since 2009 he has had solo exhibitions at Samsøñ gallery in Boston, Saltworks in Atlanta, Ellen de Bruijne Projects in Amsterdam, and Brooklyn Fire Proof gallery in New York City. He has been included in group exhibitions at the Torrance Art Museum in California, P.P.O.W. Gallery in New York City, as well the High Museum in Atlanta. He has had work included in the Aqua art fair in Miami, the MACO art fair in Mexico City, and the VoltaBasel art fair in Basel, Switzerland. His work has been reviewed in The New York Times, the Boston Globe, Artforum, and Art in America magazines, among others. He has continued to attend artist residency programs such as the Triangle Art Foundation, the Hambidge Center, Yaddo, and MacDowell. In 2018 he was awarded a Guggenheim Fellowship.

== Teaching ==
Drennen served four years (2010–12, 2016) as Dean at the Skowhegan School of Painting and Sculpture in Skowhegan, Maine and currently teaches at Georgia State University in Atlanta, Georgia. Since 2014 he has taught workshops at the Anderson Ranch Art Center in Snowmass, CO.

== Awards ==
- 2018 – Guggenheim Fellowship
- 2016 – MOCA GA Working Artist Project
- 2015 – Art Matters grant
- 2015 – MacDowell Fellow
- 2013 – Yaddo residency
- 2013 – Hambidge Center residency
- 2012 – Triangle Workshop (New York City)
- 2011 – Southeastern College Art Conference Artist Fellowship
- 2011 – Flux Projects artist grant
- 2010 – Ohio University Distinguished Alumni Award
- 2006 – Skowhegan School of Painting & Sculpture
- 2003 – Triangle Residency (Brooklyn)
- 2002 – Vermont Studio Center

== Exhibition catalogs ==
- Drennen, C. Craig Drennen | Merchant, Mistress, and T essay by Steve Locke and Jeffrey Grunthaner published by Freight+Volume, 2022
- Drennen, C. Nawi, Diana. Craig Drennen: BANDIT. published by MOCA GA. Atlanta. 2018 (ISBN 0979961017, ISBN 978-0979961014)
- Horodner, S. Painters Painting. DVD exhibition catalog. 31 minutes. 2012
- Drennen, C. Grabner, M. Timon of Athens. published by Samsøn. Boston. 2011. (ISBN 9780971753488)

== Bibliography ==
- Weiskopf, Dan. "Each Thing's a Thief: Craig Drennen’s ‘BANDIT’ at MOCA GA.” Burnaway. January 12, 2018
- StoryCorps Booth recording with Ed Hall. Burnaway. December 12, 2017
- Fischer, Marc. "A Conversation With Craig Drennen." Figure/Ground. Dec 2016
- Asper, Colleen. "Poets, Painters, and Servants: An Interview with Craig Drennen.” Art Pulse 21
- Locke, Steve. “One Question: Craig Drennen,” Art And Everything After, January 29, 2014
- Wilson, Michael. "New American Painting Spotlight: Craig Drennen speaks to Michael Wilson.” New American Painting. Vol 106, summer 2013
- Reese, Rachel. "Drennen of Atlanta." Bomb Magazine. January 17, 2013.
- Dimling Cochran, Rebecca. "Craig Drennen: Saltworks.” Art in America. May 2012
- Miller, Francine. “Craig Drennen: Samsøn.” Artforum. Feb 2011
- "Letter to Peter Schjeldahl." The Village Voice. August 26, 1997
