= Abram Schlemowitz =

American sculptor

Abram Schlemowitz (July 19, 1910 – November 13, 1998) was an American sculptor, and a member of the American Abstract Artists group. He was a 1963 Guggenheim Fellow.

Schlemowitz taught at the Pratt Institute, and Kingsborough Community College. His papers are held at the Archives of American Art.

== Exhibitions ==
- 1971– NYU Loeb Student Center.
