= Katasha Artis =

American basketball player and coach

Personal information
- Born: July 8, 1973 (age 52) New York, New York, U.S.
- Listed height: 6 ft 1 in (1.85 m)

Career information
- High school: South Shore (Brooklyn, New York)
- College: Virginia (1990–1992); Northeastern (1992–1995)
- Position: Forward

Career highlights
- 2x NAC Player of the Year (1994, 1995); 2x First-team All-NAC (1994, 1995); AEC Freshman of the Year (1993); AEC All-Freshman Team (1993)
- Stats at Basketball Reference

Katasha Renee Artis (born July 8, 1973) is an American basketball player who played in the WNBA. She is a member of the Northeastern University athletics Hall of Fame. Artis was inducted in 2001 for her accomplishments in the sport of basketball. Artis is currently the head coach at Kingsborough Community College.

== College career ==
Artis began her collegiate career at the University of Virginia after being an All-American as a high school star in Brooklyn. During her first season at Virginia, Artis suffered a knee injury and transferred to Northeastern.

After sitting out the required on year due to NCAA transfer rules, Artis began to play for the Huskies as a sophomore. She averaged 14.4 points and 9.3 rebounds a game during her first season.

Her junior year saw Artis take her game to the next level. Artis lead Northeastern to the Eastern U.S. playoffs and was voted American East Player of the Year and was voted to the All-East and District I All-American teams. She averaged 20.6 points per hame.

During her senior season Artis averaged 21.2 points per game, leading the Huskies to a 19-10 season. Artis was voted American East Player of the Year for the second straight season, along with All-East and District I All-American.

== Professional career ==
Artis played the 1997 season with the WNBA Charlotte Sting. She also played professionally in Turkey for a number of years.

== Career statistics ==
Legend
GP	Games played	GS	Games started	MPG	Minutes per game	RPG	Rebounds per game
APG	Assists per game	SPG	Steals per game	BPG	Blocks per game	PPG	Points per game
TO	Turnovers per game	FG%	Field-goal percentage	3P%	3-point field-goal percentage	FT%	Free-throw percentage
**Bold**	Career best	°	League leader

=== WNBA ===
==== Regular season ====
Year	Team	GP	GS	MPG	FG%	3P%	FT%	RPG	APG	SPG	BPG	TO	PPG
1997	Charlotte	20	0	5.7	25.0	0.0	53.3	0.8	0.4	0.3	0.1	0.6	0.8
Career	1 year, 1 team	20	0	5.7	25.0	0.0	53.3	0.8	0.4	0.3	0.1	0.6	0.8

=== College ===
Year	Team	GP	GS	MPG	FG%	3P%	FT%	RPG	APG	SPG	BPG	TO	PPG
1992–93	Northeastern	**28**	-	-	40.4	0.0	**68.0**	9.3	1.1	2.7	2.5	-	14.4
1993–94	Northeastern	27	-	-	**44.8**	0.0	64.1	**10.2**	1.3	**3.5**	**3.1**	-	20.6
1994–95	Northeastern	**28**	-	-	42.5	**33.3**	55.5	8.9	**1.4**	3.3	2.4	-	**21.2**°
**Career**		83	-	-	42.7	30.0	61.7	9.5	1.3	3.1	2.7	-	18.7
Statistics retrieved from Sports-Reference.

== Coaching ==
Before the 2007-08 season, Artis was named the head women's basketball coach at Kingsborough Community College.
