= Manhattan Beach Air Force Station =

Coordinates: 40°34′38.48″N 73°56′4.15″W

Manhattan Beach Air Force Station was a United States Air Force installation located in Manhattan Beach, Brooklyn, New York City, and operational from 1954 to 1959. Built on land originally operated by the United States Maritime Service and the United States Coast Guard, it was later transferred to the Department of the Army, and later Kingsborough Community College.

== See also ==
- Sheepshead Bay Maritime Service Training Station (1942-1954)
- Manhattan Beach Coast Guard Training Station
