= Manhattan Beach (march) =

1893 march by John Philip Sousa

- March by John Philip Sousa
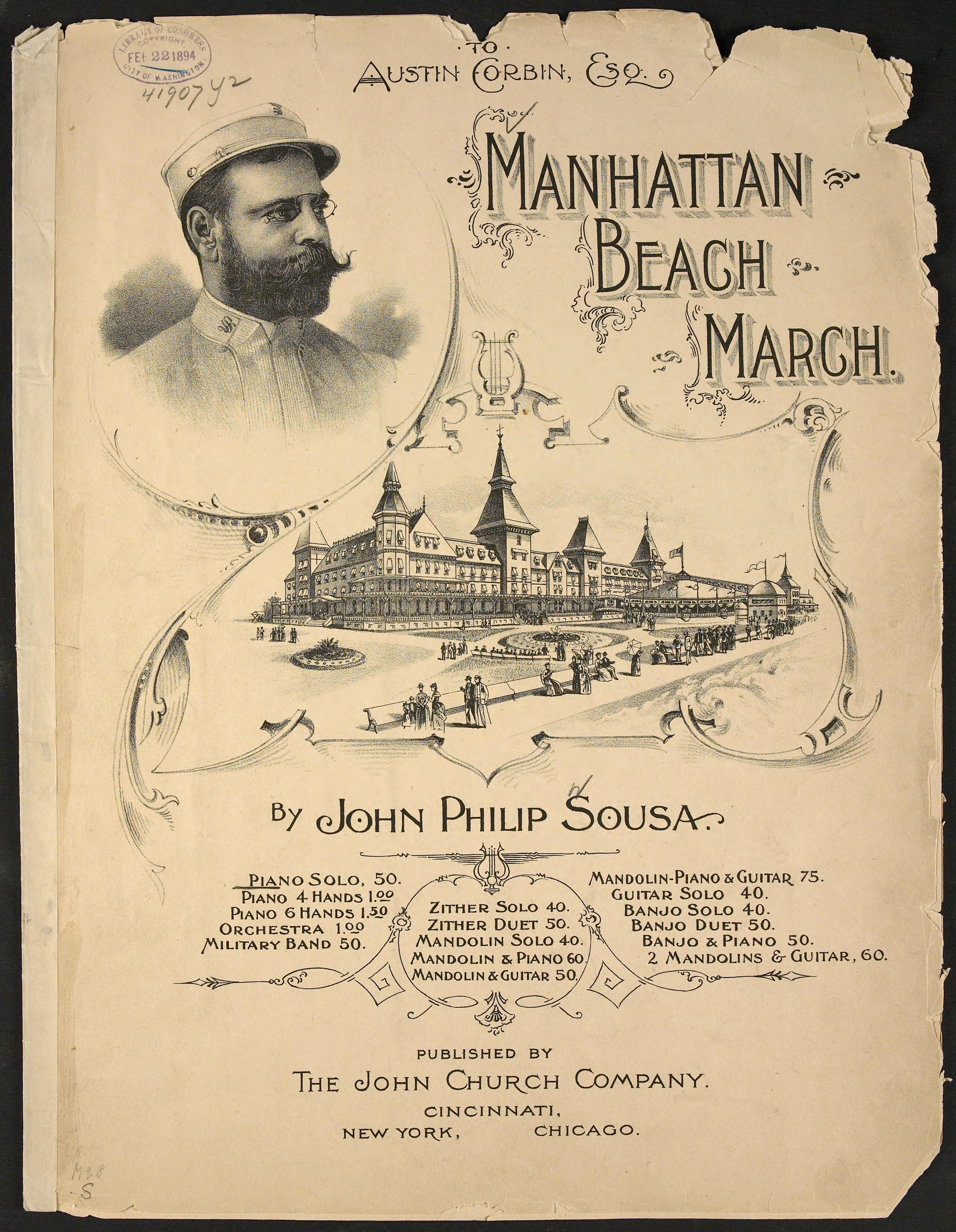
- Year: 1893
- Dedication: Manhattan Beach Park

"Manhattan Beach" is an American march by John Philip Sousa (1854–1932). It was written in 1893 to commemorate the Manhattan Beach Park resort.

== History ==
Sousa and his band began playing at the Manhattan Beach resort after the death of popular musician and conductor Patrick Gilmore. Once a new theater was constructed at the resort, Sousa celebrated his first performance in there with his newly composed Manhattan Beach march, dedicated to the owner, Austin Corbin.

The Manhattan Beach, according to Sousa, was based on a previous march written during the start of his career, as an orchestra's conductor for a production of the play The Phoenix. The march, originally titled "The Bludso March," named after a character in the show, was not intended for use within the production but was dedicated to actor Milton Nobles.

== Composition ==
It follows the march style: Intro(4 bars)--[:A(16):]--[:B(16):]--Trio [:C(16):]--[:D(16):]. In part D, the tune starts quietly, grows louder and fades away. The march is notable for lacking a "stinger" or tutti chord on beat two.

== See also ==
- List of marches by John Philip Sousa
