= Stanley G. Cohen =

American music educator (1928–2022)

Stanley G. Cohen (February 4, 1928 – September 8, 2022) was the first President of Five Towns College located in Dix Hills, NY on Long Island. He served as president for 40 years since the college was chartered in 1972. He founded the Dix Hills Performing Arts Center, which is located at the college.

Cohen earned his Doctorate in Education (Ed.D.) and his Bachelor of Science (B.S.) from New York University in Music Education. He obtained his Master of Arts (M.A.) degree from Queens College.

Cohen taught music at the James Madison, Francis Lewis, and John Bowne High Schools in Queens, and was instrumental in establishing music programs at the latter two schools. He also served as an associate professor of music at Kingsborough Community College of the City University of New York, an Assistant Examiner for the NYC Board of Examiners for prospective music teachers, and the Director of the Lincoln Center Performances for the NYC School Study and Concert Group.

Cohen was a saxophonist, clarinettist, and flutist, as well as playing trumpet and piano. He was married to the late Lorraine Kleinman-Cohen; they have three children, Martin, David, and Janet.

Cohen was a trustee of the Long Island Regional Advisory Council on Higher Education (LIRACHE), a member of the National Association of Jazz Educators (NAJE), a member of the National Association of Schools of Music (NASM), a member of the American Federation of Musicians, among other organizations.
