= Sheepshead Bay Maritime Service Training Station =

Coordinates: 40°34′41″N 73°55′59″W

- Type: Public
- Active: September 1, 1942–February 28, 1954
- Affiliations: United States Maritime Service; United States Coast Guard; War Shipping Administration
- Students: 30,000
- Location: Sheepshead Bay, Brooklyn, New York, United States
- Campus: Urban

The United States Maritime Service Training Station at Sheepshead Bay was opened on September 1, 1942. It closed on February 28, 1954.

The station was the largest maritime training station during World War II and was equipped to train 30,000 merchant seamen each year. Since the mid-1960s, the site has been occupied by Kingsborough Community College.

== See also ==
- Manhattan Beach Air Force Station (1954–1959)
- Manhattan Beach Coast Guard Training Station
