= Calvin Edouard Ward =

American pianist, music theorist and educator

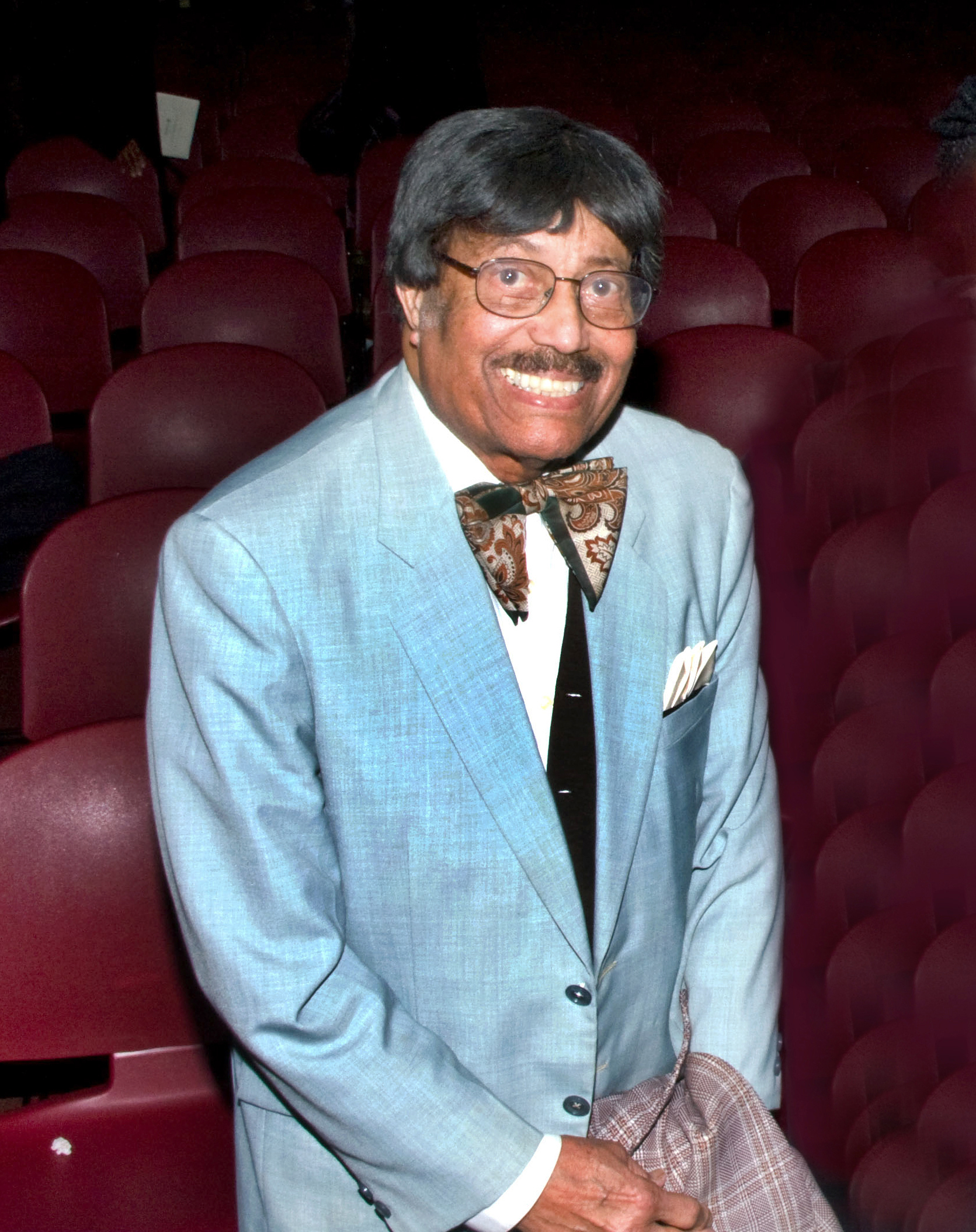
Dr. Calvin Edouard Ward in 2011, photo by Vincent Bryant

Calvin Edouard Ward (April 19, 1925 – February 10, 2018) was an American concert pianist, music theorist and educator.

== Biography ==
He was born in Atlanta, GA, and educated at Morehouse College, Northwestern University and the University of Vienna in Austria.The second child and first son of Effie Elizabeth Crawford Ward (graduate of Spelman College, where she was a classmate of Alberta Williams King, mother of Rev. Dr. Martin Luther King Jr, and sewing instructor at Atlanta's Evening School) and Jefferson Sigman Ward (graduate of the Haynes Institute in Augusta, GA, World War I veteran, Pullman porter and small businessman), Ward demonstrated musical prowess, including the ability to memorize tunes, from two years of age. As a four-year-old kindergartner at Atlanta's Oglethorpe School, he attracted his teacher's attention when he played the hymn "Just as I Am" in thirds on the classroom toy piano. He began formal music lessons when he entered first grade and within a year was playing complete sonatas. By the age of 10, Ward was accompanying the church choir and performing throughout Atlanta.

After graduating from high school, Ward studied piano at Morehouse College, then served for two years in the United States Army, rising to the rank of sergeant chaplain's assistant. Resuming music studies, he earned a Bachelor of Music in pipe organ performance in 1949 and Master of Music in choral performance in 1950. Ward taught at Florida A&M University and served as University Organist from 1950 to 1951. Ward received a Fulbright Fellowship to study organ at the Staatsakademie und Hochschule für Musik und darstellende Kunst in Vienna, Austria, and earned his Doktorat in Musical Research from the University of Vienna in 1955.

Ward taught at Southern University in Baton Rouge, Louisiana from 1957 to 1958, and was chair of the Department of Music and Fine Arts at South Carolina State College from 1959 to 1961. He taught at Kingsborough Community College in New York for two years. From 1968 to 1972, he conducted the choir and chaired the Department of Music at the Tuskegee Institute. He taught music theory, applied organ and African-American classical music at the Peabody Conservatory of Music at Johns Hopkins from 1972 to 1977, and later taught as an adjunct at the University of Maryland at Baltimore and at Coppin State College.

In 1977, a Fulbright-Hays fellowship provided the opportunity to do research in Paris, France and Lambaréné, French Equatorial Africa. Ward was a guest lecturer at Cuttington University College in the Republic of Liberia in 1979, and was a Phelps-Stokes African-American Exchange Scholar at Kenyatta University College in Nairobi, Kenya. In 1986 he became the first Fulbright fellow to both lecture and perform. He was the first African-American visiting professor and co-conductor of the choir at the State Conservatory of Music in Vilnius, Lithuania and the first American guest conductor/lecturer of the Ave Sol Choir at the State Conservatory of Music in Riga, Latvia. He was the first American to perform on the Riga Cathedral's renowned Walcker pipe organ. Ward traveled to the St. Petersburg State Conservatory in the USSR, where he lectured in African-American classical composers, and to St. John's Theological College in New South Wales, Australia in 1990. In 1998, he accompanied the Street Theatre Dance Ensemble on the piano in concerts at the Island Center for the Performing Arts in St. Croix, Virgin Islands.

Ward administered music activities for the Trenton, NJ public school system from 1991 to 1995, and conducted vocal music workshops for teachers and students. After retirement, Ward continued to play organ at special occasions and to play an active role in the Willingboro, New Jersey community.
