= Michael Novakhov =

American politician

Misha Novakhov
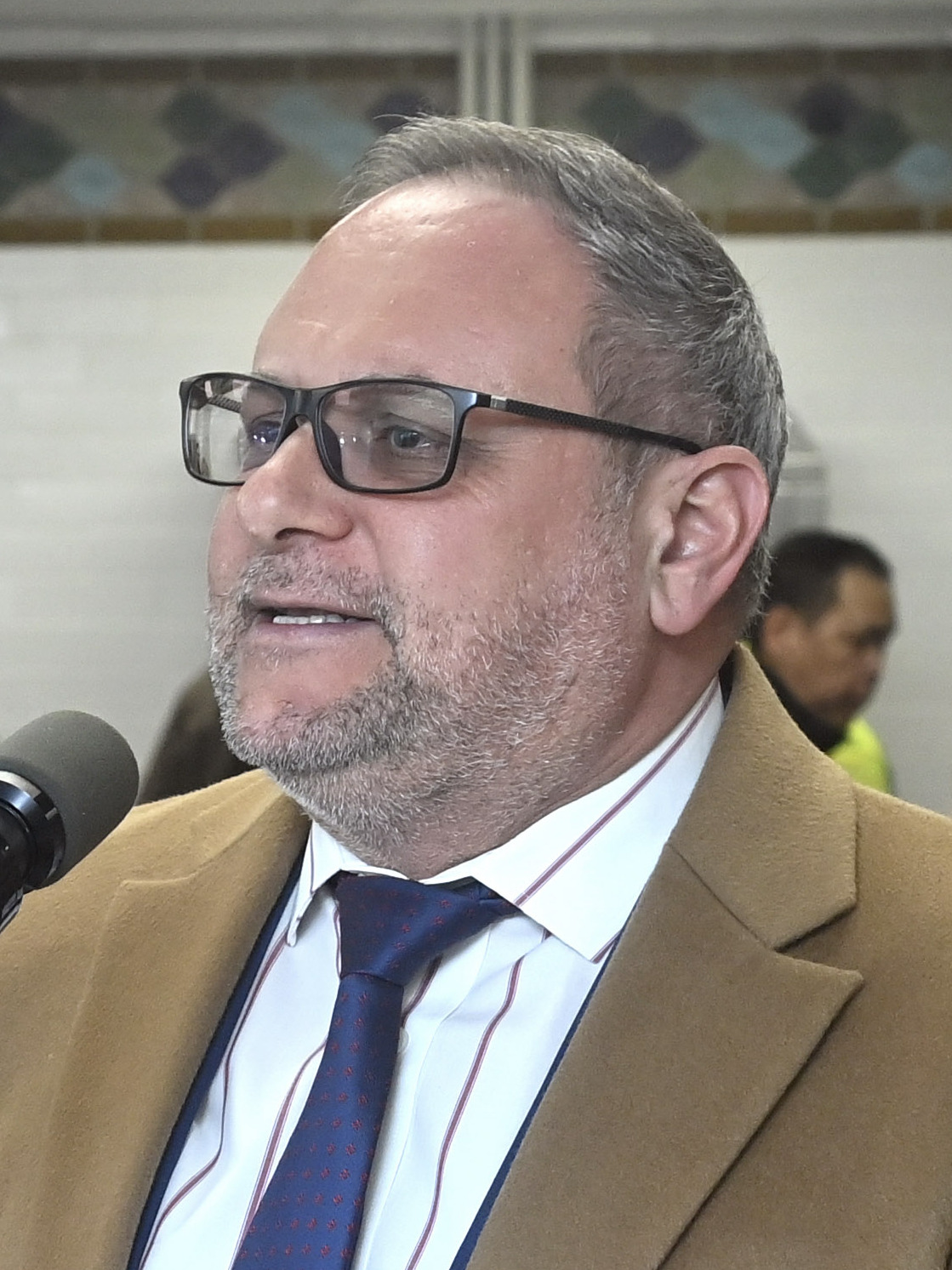
- Novakhov speaking in 2026

Member of the New York State Assembly from the 45th district
- Incumbent
- Assumed office January 1, 2023
- Preceded by: Steven Cymbrowitz

Personal details
- Born: April 13, 1976 (age 50) Baku, Azerbaijan SSR, Soviet Union (now Azerbaijan)
- Party: Republican/ Conservative
- Education: Moscow State University Faculty of Journalism
- Profession: Politician; radio station founder and radio host
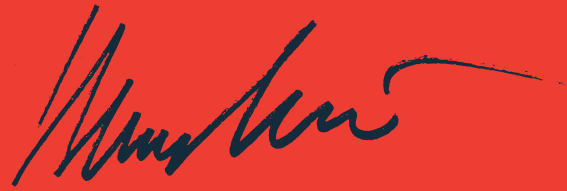
- Signature
- Website: State Assembly website

Michael "Misha" Novakhov (Ukrainian: Михайло Міша Новахов, romanization: Mykhaylo Misha Novakhov; born April 13, 1976) is an American radio station founder and host, and politician. He has served as a member of the New York State Assembly from the 45th district since January 1, 2023. The Assembly District includes portions of Brighton Beach, Gravesend, Manhattan Beach, Midwood, and Sheepshead Bay in Brooklyn, New York. He has run on the Republican Party/ Conservative Party lines.

Prior to being elected, he worked as a host on the Russian-language radio station Freedom FM, which he co-founded. In July 2026, Novakhov called on the United States Department of Justice to open a civil rights investigation into New York City Mayor Zohran Mamdani for fostering a dangerous climate for minority communities in the city.

== Personal life ==
Novakhov was born on April 13, 1976, in Baku, Azerbaijan, in the former USSR, and is Jewish; he refers to himself as a "secular Jew". His hometown is Moscow, and he studied at Moscow State University Faculty of Journalism. His Soviet passport showed Baku as his place of birth, and "Ukrainian" as his nationality, indicating that he has at least one ethnic Ukrainian parent. He has described how he was "born under Communist rule within the former USSR" and that "his father was fortunate enough to escape along with Michael and the rest of his family to America."

He is a long-time community advocate and resident of Manhattan Beach in Brooklyn, New York City.

== Career ==
=== Radio ===
Novakhov has worked in the radio business since 2003. In 2019, he co-founded "Freedom FM", a Russian-language radio station in Brooklyn on which he served as a host. The radio station became the most listened-to Russian-language radio station in the U.S.

=== New York State Assembly ===
==== 2022–24 ====
In 2022,Novakhov ran for the New York State Assembly to represent the 45th district, on the Republican Party and Conservative Party lines. The Assembly District includes portions of Brighton Beach, Gravesend, Manhattan Beach, Midwood, and Sheepshead Bay in Brooklyn, New York.

In the New York State Assembly 2022 election, Novakhov defeated 21-year incumbent Democratic assemblyman Steven Cymbrowitz by 19 percentage points, 59.7% to 40.2%. He assumed office on January 1, 2023.

In 2023, Novakhov introduced a bill which, had it passed, would have prohibited public smoking of marijuana unless local government approved of it, saying that if tobacco smoke is prohibited in certain areas then cannabis should be as well, noting "the nuisance created by the smoke and the potential health hazards of second-hand smoke." His proposed bill would have largely treated marijuana smoking like tobacco smoking, which is banned in public places in New York City. The bill was referred to the Committee on Economic Development, where it remained without moving to a floor vote.

==== 2024–present ====
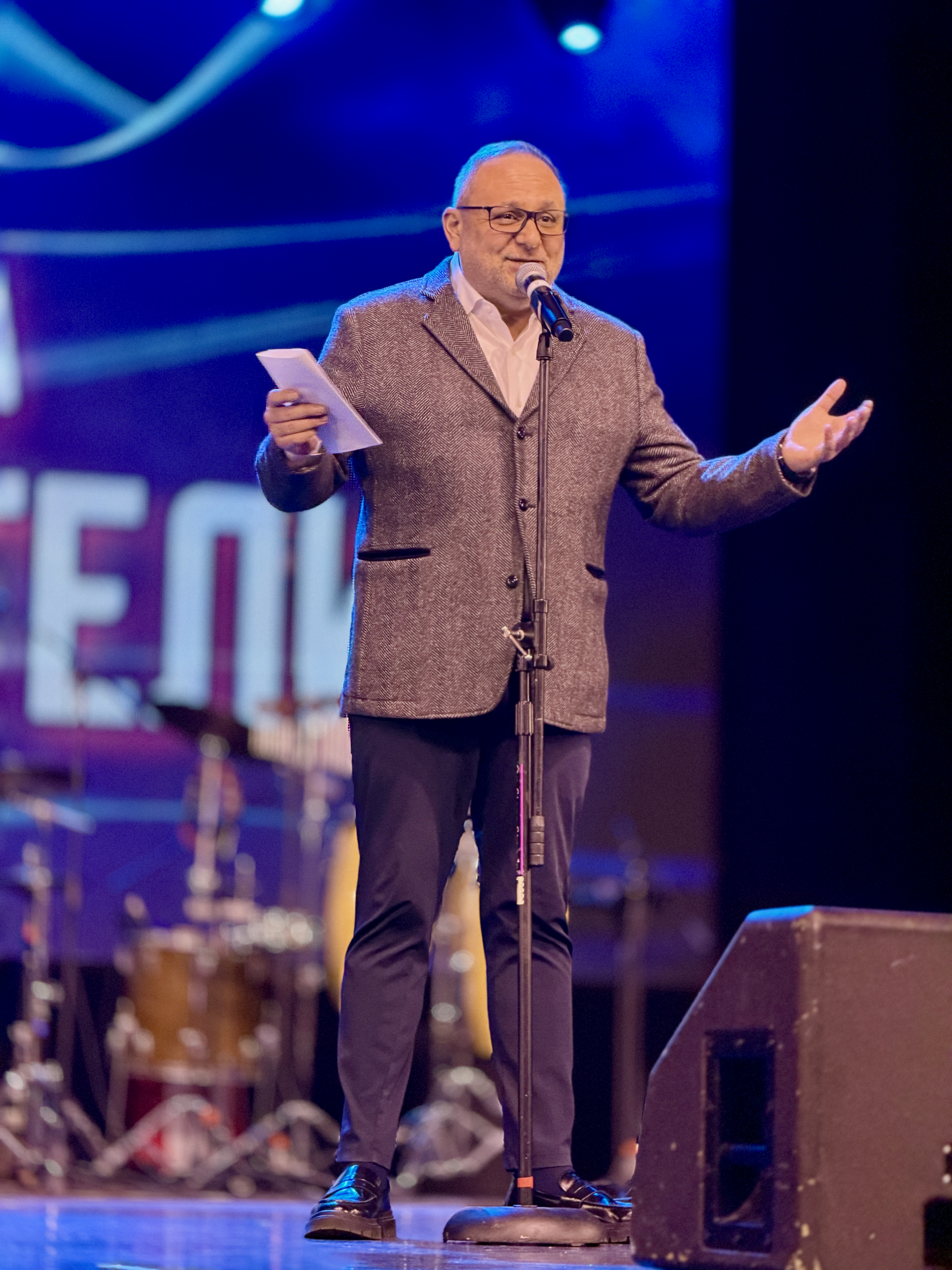
Novakhov in 2026

In the 2024 New York State Assembly election, endorsed by the National Federation of Independent Business, Novakhov defeated Democratic challenger Joey Cohen-Saban by 50.2% to 49.4%. His current term runs through January 1, 2027.

His committee assignments in the NY State Assembly in 2025–26 consist of the Aging Committee, Cities Committee, Housing Committee, Governmental Operations Committee, and Small Business Committee.

In May 2026, he relaunched his “Not on Our Dollar” bill, which proposes “Ending New York funding of Hamas violence.” That same month, speaking of the New York City Mayor, Novakhov said

Zohran Mamdani represents everything that is going wrong in New York City. He represents the radical, antisemitic, anti-police, anti-American movement that has taken over today’s Democratic Party.... This is no longer the party of working people. This is a party controlled by radical activists, communist ideologists … agitators and people who make excuses for hatred and terrorism when Jews are the targets....

In July 2026, Novakhov announced after two stabbing attacks, including one of a Jewish man outside a synagogue, by a man allegedly shouting “Allahu Akbar” in New York City that he was formally calling on the United States Department of Justice to open a civil rights investigation into New York City Mayor Zohran Mamdani for fostering a dangerous climate for minority communities in the city.

In November 2026, Novakhov again faced Democratic challenger Joey Cohen-Saban (who also ran on the Fight Anti-Semitism ballot line) in the 2026 New York State Assembly general election. Novakhov was endorsed by the New York Young Republican Club.

Preliminary counts from the end of Election Day indicated a Novakhov had lost after receiving 38% of the vote with 95% of scanners results were reported. The following day, Novakhov left a message conceding the race on his official Facebook page.

=== Political positions ===
Novakhov's political positions include a desire to support public safety by supporting law enforcement and combating rising crime (in particular against the Asian American, Pacific Islander, and Jewish communities), to make health care and housing more affordable, to support small businesses, and to protect the quality of life for New Yorkers. Novakhov is "a proud Zionist." He is staunchly pro-Ukraine in the Russia-Ukraine war.

== Electoral history ==
2022 New York State Assembly election, District 45
| Party | Candidate | Votes | % |
|---|---|---|---|
| Republican | Michael Novakhov | 12,936 | |
| Conservative | Michael Novakhov | 821 | |
| Total | Michael Novakhov | 13,757 | 59.7 |
| Democratic | Steven Cymbrowitz | 8,451 | |
| Independence | Steven Cymbrowitz | 807 | |
| Total | Steven Cymbrowitz | 9,258 | 40.2 |
| Write-in | | 16 | 0.1 |
| Total votes | | 23,031 | 100.0 |
| Republican gain from Democratic | | | |
