= Kingsborough Community College =

Community college in Brooklyn, New York, U.S.

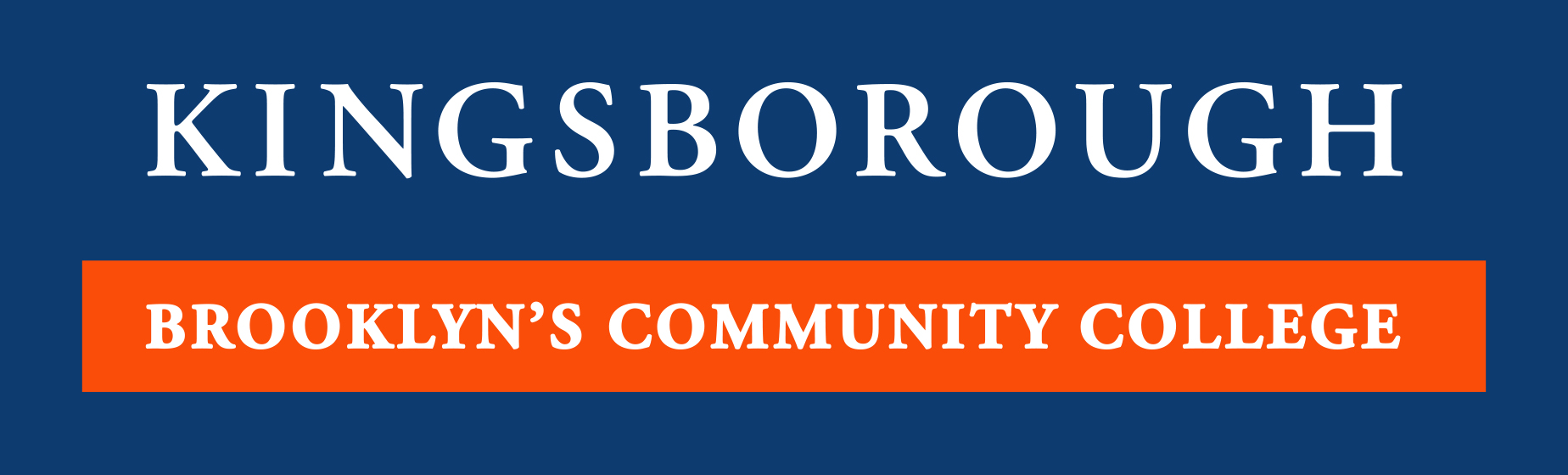
- Type: Public community college
- Established: 1963
- Parent institution: CUNY
- President: Suri Duitch
- Provost: Sharon Warren Cook
- Students: 15,042 (fall 2022)
- Undergraduates: 18,634
- Location: Brooklyn, New York City, New York, 11235, United States; 40°34′41″N 73°55′59″W
- Campus: Urban
- Colors: Blue and orange
- Website: kbcc.cuny.edu

Kingsborough Community College (KCC) is a public community college in Manhattan Beach, Brooklyn, New York. It is part of the City University of New York (CUNY) system and the only community college in Brooklyn.

== History ==
Founded in 1963, Kingsborough Community College serves a widely diverse population of approximately 14,000 students. The college has been identified as an Aspen Prize Top Community College seven consecutive times by the Aspen Institute College Excellence Program, finishing in the top 10 three times, most recently in 2023.

In 2019 Leonard Riggio, the founder and chairman of Barnes & Noble book stores, donated $1 million toward scholarships for Kingsborough students.

== Academics ==
KCC offers over 50 programs of study, including the only New York State license-approved polysomnographic technology degree program in New York City and NYC’s first and only accredited A.A.S. degree in surgical technology. It is the first college in Brooklyn with a New York State Department of Health–Bureau of Emergency Medical Services-approved paramedic curriculum. Its maritime program, replete with its own boats and dock, offers training for various careers at sea.

== Campus ==
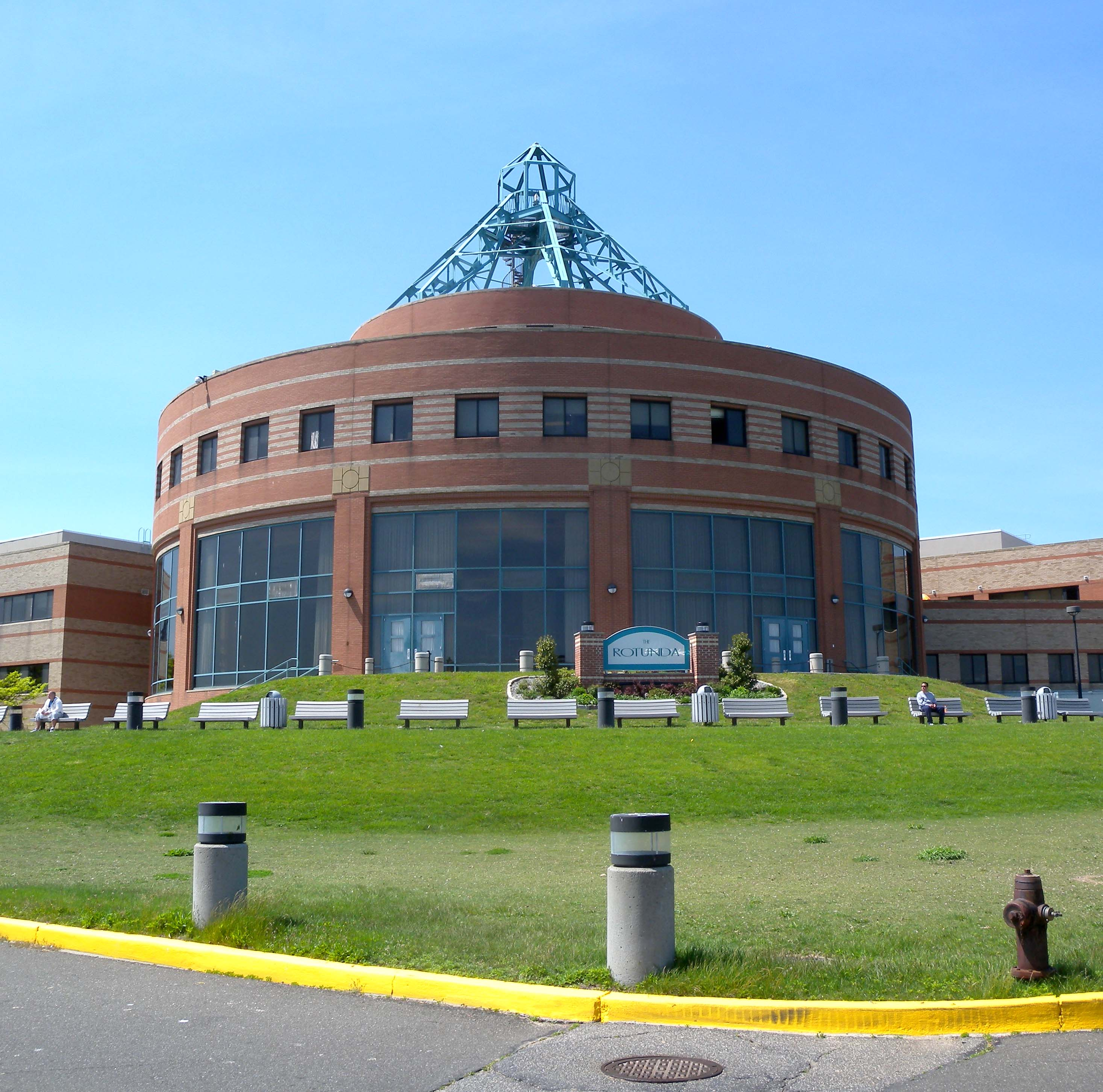
KCC's Marine Academic Center (MAC) features a working lighthouse.

Located in Manhattan Beach, Brooklyn, the 71-acre (287,300 m^{2}) campus overlooks Sheepshead Bay, Jamaica Bay, and the Atlantic Ocean. It is located on the site of the old Sheepshead Bay Maritime Training Center for Merchant Marines, Coast Guard and Navy and the Manhattan Beach Air Force Station.

A working lighthouse, # 34360, sits atop the Marine Academic Center (MAC). Designed by Gruzen Samton Architects, it has flashed a white light every 4 seconds since 1990.

The library at Kingsborough Community College is named after former City University of New York Chancellor Robert Kibbee. The 743-seat Leon M. Goldstein Performing Arts Center at Kingsborough was named in honor of Leon M. Goldstein, who was president at the college from 1971 to 1999. Kingsborough is the only college in New York City with its own private beach, which is open for swimming during the summer.

== Public transit access ==
Kingsborough Community College is accessible with the B49 bus from the Sheepshead Bay station or the B1 bus from the Brighton Beach station, via transfer from the B or Q train.

== Athletics ==
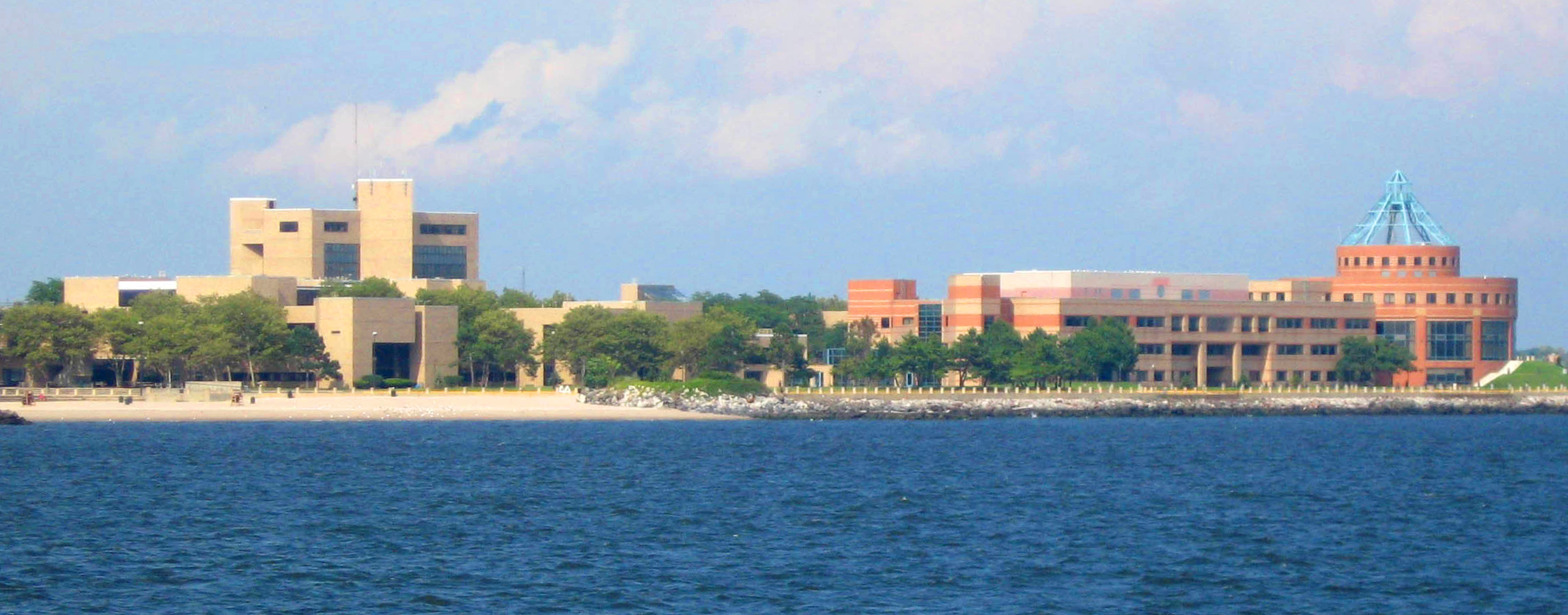
The campus is bounded by three bodies of water: Jamaica Bay to the east, Sheepshead Bay to the north, and the Atlantic Ocean to the south

Kingsborough Community College teams participate as a member of the National Junior College Athletic Association (NJCAA). The Wave is a member of the community college section of the City University of New York Athletic Conference (CUNYAC). Men's sports include baseball, basketball, tennis, and track & field; while women's sports include basketball, tennis, track & field, and volleyball.

== Notable alumni ==
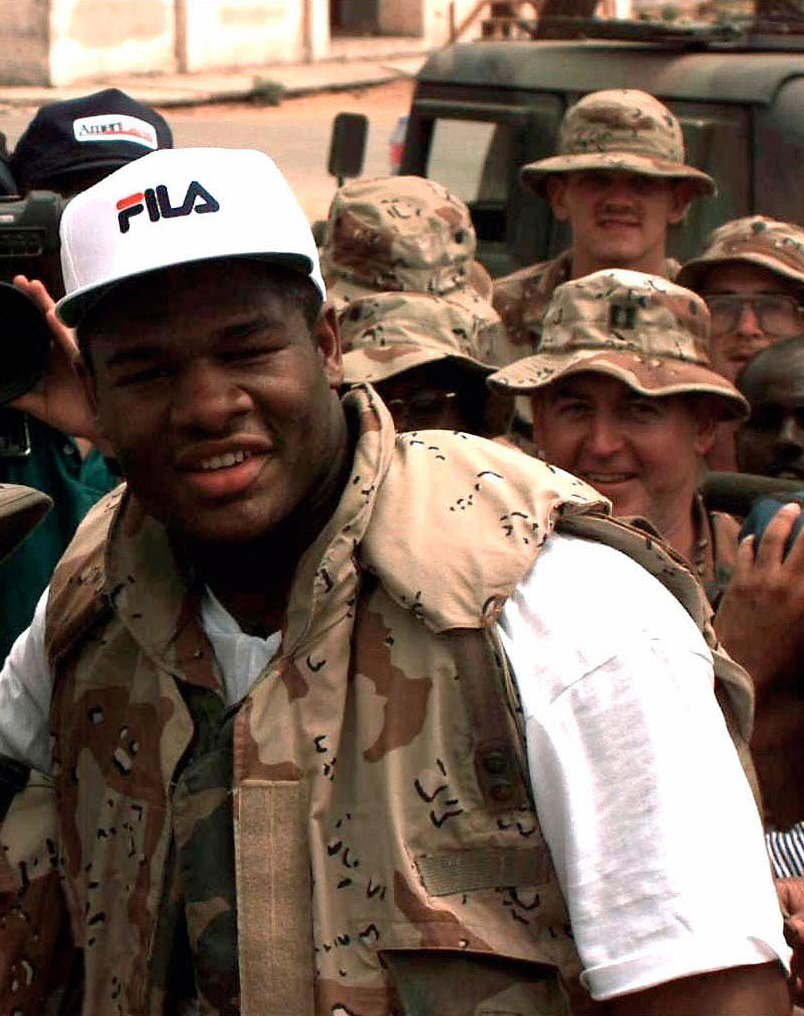
Riddick Bowe

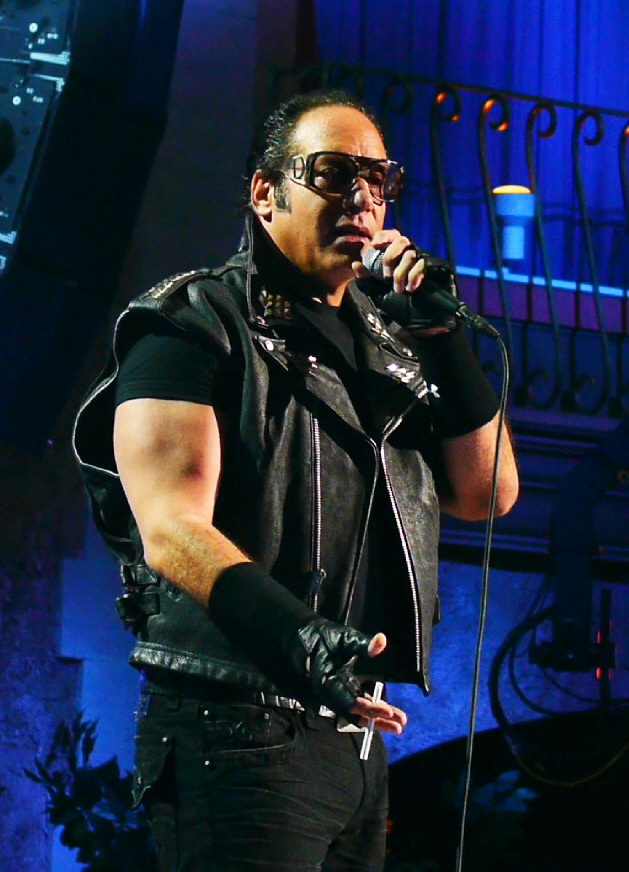
Andrew Dice Clay

- Tessa Bailey, romance novelist
- Riddick Bowe (born 1967), world champion heavyweight boxer
- Eric Carr (1950–1991), multi-instrumentalist and musician
- Mauriel Carty (born 1997), Anguillan sprinter
- Andrew Dice Clay (born Andrew Clay Silverstein; 1957), standup comedian and actor
- Tashni-Ann Dubroy (née Coote; born c. 1981), Jamaican academic and university administrator, president of Shaw University
- Pete Falcone (born 1953), New York Mets major league pitcher
- Jeff Koinange (born 1966), Kenyan former CNN Africa correspondent
- Phillipe Nover (born 1984), TUF 8 finalist and UFC fighter
- Rey Palacios (born 1962), Kansas City Royals Major League baseball catcher
- Barbara Patton (born 1944), lawyer and politician
- Chris Rock (born 1965), comedian, actor, and filmmaker.
- Sid Rosenberg (born 1967), radio personality
- Larry Seabrook, former New York City Councilman
- Peter Steele (né Ratajczyk; 1962–2010), bassist and lead vocalist for Type O Negative, Carnivore, and Fallout
- Fred Stoller (born 1958), actor, stand-up comedian, and author.
- Aesha Waks, Israeli-born American actress
- Andrew D. Weyman, television director and producer

== Notable faculty ==
- Katasha Artis (born 1973), basketball player and coach
- Stanley G. Cohen, president of Five Towns College
- Eleanor Cory (born 1943), composer
- Craig Drennen (born 1966), artist
- Paul Goldberg, geologist
- Leon M. Goldstein (died 1999), President of Kingsborough Community College, and acting Chancellor of the City University of New York
- Victor Gorelick (1941–2020), comic book editor and executive
- Dan Grimaldi (born 1952), actor on the HBO TV series The Sopranos
- Sharad Karkhanis (1935–2013), library faculty member who co-founded the Asian Pacific American Librarians Association
- Seymour P. Lachman (born 1933), professor, political historian, book author, and politician
- Ronny Lee (born Ronald Leventhal; 1927–2015), guitarist and author of music instruction publications
- Ursula Mamlok (born Ursula Meyer; 1923–2016), composer
- David Maslanka (1943–2017), composer
- Fred Mitchell (1923–2013), New York School Abstract Expressionist artist
- Regina Peruggi (born c. 1947), President of Kingsborough Community College
- Abram Schlemowitz (1910–1998), sculptor
- Frederic Matys Thursz (1930–1992), abstract painter
- Calvin Edouard Ward (1925–2018), concert pianist, music theorist, and educator
