= Steven Cymbrowitz =

American politician

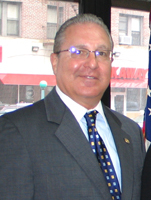

Member of the New York State Assembly from the 45th district
- In office January 3, 2001 – December 31, 2022
- Preceded by: Lena Cymbrowitz
- Succeeded by: Michael Novakhov

Personal details
- Born: Steven H. Cymbrowitz; November 14, 1953 (age 72) Bronx, New York, U.S.
- Party: Democratic
- Spouse(s): Lena Cymbrowitz; Vilma Huertas
- Children: 2
- Profession: Politician; lawyer

Steven H. Cymbrowitz (born November 14, 1953) is a Democratic politician from the state of New York. He served in the New York State Assembly representing Assembly District 45, which included Brighton Beach, Manhattan Beach and Midwood in the borough of Brooklyn, from 2001 to 2022. Cymbrowitz was unseated by Republican Michael Novakhov in the 2022 midterm election.

== Early life and education ==
Cymbrowitz is Jewish and is the son of Holocaust survivors.

He received a B.A. degree from C.W. Post College in 1974. He also holds an M.A. in social work from Adelphi University and a J.D. from Brooklyn Law School.

== Career ==
Cymbrowitz has served as the Executive Director of the North Brooklyn Development Corporation, as Director of Housing and Community Development for the Metropolitan New York Coordinating Council on Jewish Poverty, and as the Director of Intergovernmental Relations within the New York City Housing Authority (NYCHA).

A Democrat, Cymbrowitz was first elected to the State Assembly in 2000. He ran uncontested in the 2008 general election. In the 2010 general election, he received 57 percent of the vote running against Republican challenger Joseph Hayon.

Cymbrowitz served as chair of the Assembly Housing Committee, the Assembly Aging Committee, and the Assembly Alcoholism and Drug Abuse Committee. He introduced Assembly resolutions to memorialize Holocaust Remembrance Day. He voted against same-sex marriage legislation.

Republican Michael Novakhov defeated Cymbrowitz in the 2022 midterm election, by 19 percentage points, 59.7% to 40.2%.

== Personal life ==
Cymbrowitz was married to Lena Azizo Cymbrowitz, who represented Assembly District 45 until her death from cancer in 2000 at the age of 43. Steven and Lena Cymbrowitz had two children, Jay and Jennifer. Following his wife's death, Cymbrowitz helped to create the Lena Cymbrowitz Pavilion at the Maimonides Cancer Center.

Cymbrowitz is married to Vilma Huertas.

New York State Assembly
Preceded by Lena Cymbrowitz	New York State Assembly, 45th District; 2000–2022	Succeeded by Michael Novakhov
