= Manhattan Beach, Brooklyn =

Neighborhood in New York City

Manhattan Beach
- Neighborhood of Brooklyn
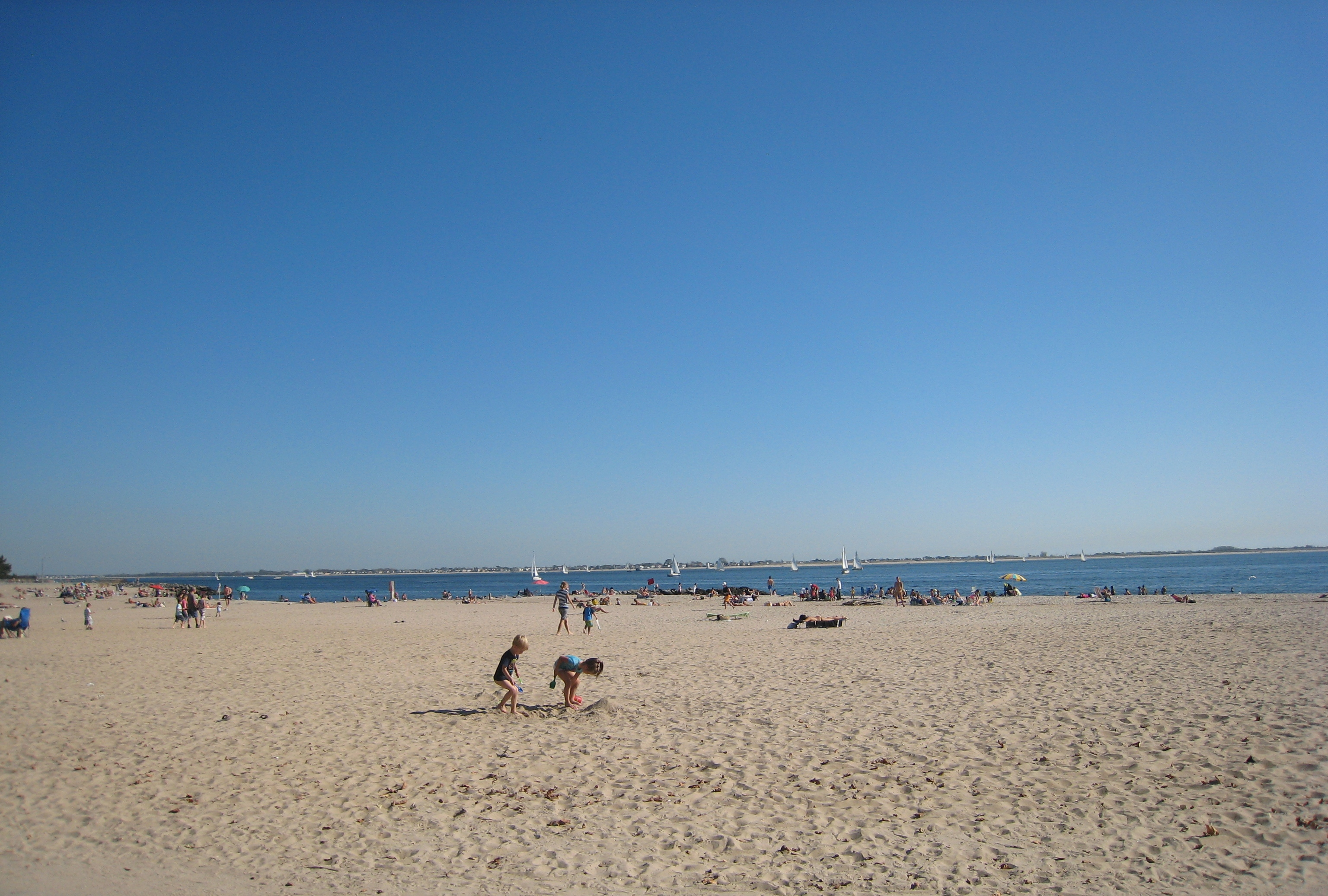
- The neighborhood's namesake beach along the Atlantic Ocean
- Interactive map of Manhattan Beach
- Coordinates: 40.578°N 73.944°W
- Country: United States
- State: New York
- City: New York City
- Borough: Brooklyn
- Community District: Brooklyn 15
- Time zone: UTC−5 (Eastern)
  - Summer (DST): UTC−4 (EDT)
- ZIP Code: 11235
- Area code: 718, 347, 929, and 917

Manhattan Beach is a residential neighborhood in the New York City borough of Brooklyn. It is bounded by the Atlantic Ocean to the south and east, by Sheepshead Bay on the north, and Brighton Beach to the west. Traditionally known as an Italian and Ashkenazi Jewish neighborhood, it is also home to a sizable community of Sephardi Jews and a large Russian Jewish immigrant presence.

Manhattan Beach is part of Brooklyn Community District 15, and its primary ZIP Code is 11235. It is patrolled by the 61st Precinct of the New York City Police Department. Politically it is represented by the New York City Council's 48th District. The area is also represented by the Manhattan Beach Community Group, established in 1941, and the Manhattan Beach Neighborhood Association, established in 2008.

== History ==
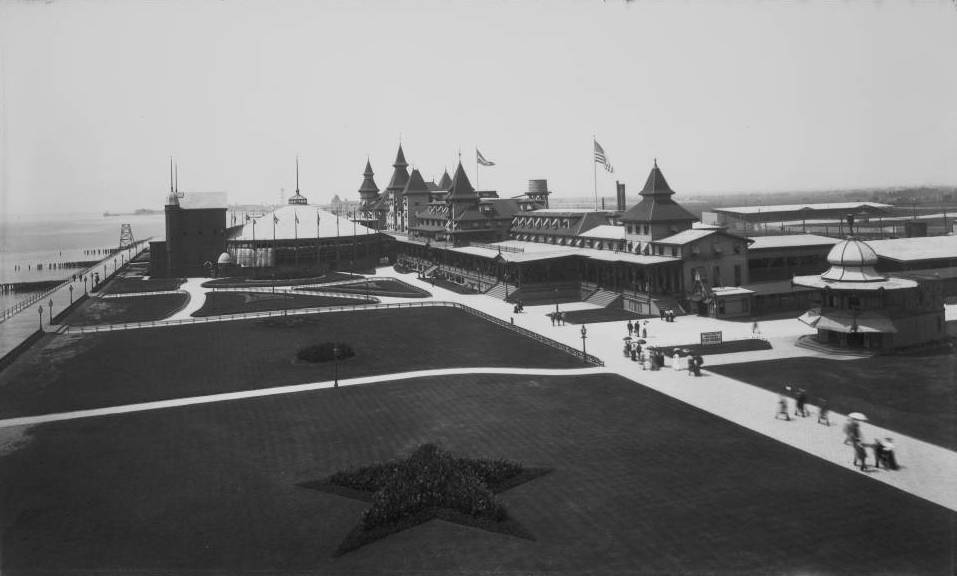
Manhattan Beach Hotel c. 1905

Manhattan Beach was the most upscale of the three major resort areas that developed at Coney Island shortly after the American Civil War; the other two areas were Brighton Beach and West Brighton.

It was developed in the last quarter of the 19th century as a resort by Austin Corbin, later president of the Long Island Rail Road, for whom the street Corbin Place, which marks the boundary between Brighton Beach and Manhattan Beach, was originally named. Corbin Place has since been renamed to M. Corbin Place, after Margaret Corbin, the hero of the American Revolutionary War, due to Austin Corbin's antisemitism. In 1877, Corbin built the famous Manhattan Beach Hotel, followed by the even grander Oriental Hotel in 1880. The Coney Island Jockey Club horse racing track opened nearby at the same time as Corbin's Oriental Hotel; together, these three establishments drew thousands of visitors to Manhattan Beach. The hotels held daily concerts led by famous conductors such as Conterno, Gilmore, and John Philip Sousa, and hosted elaborate nightly fireworks displays, drawing tens of thousands of visitors on summer nights and making Manhattan Beach a renowned summer seaside resort. Sousa composed the "Manhattan Beach" march in 1893 to commemorate the beach resort. Corbin, an anti-Semite who served as the secretary of the American Society for the Suppression of Jews, barred Jews from the resort. In 1895, Corbin built a 12,000 capacity third-mile concrete cycling track behind the hotel at a cost of $30,000.

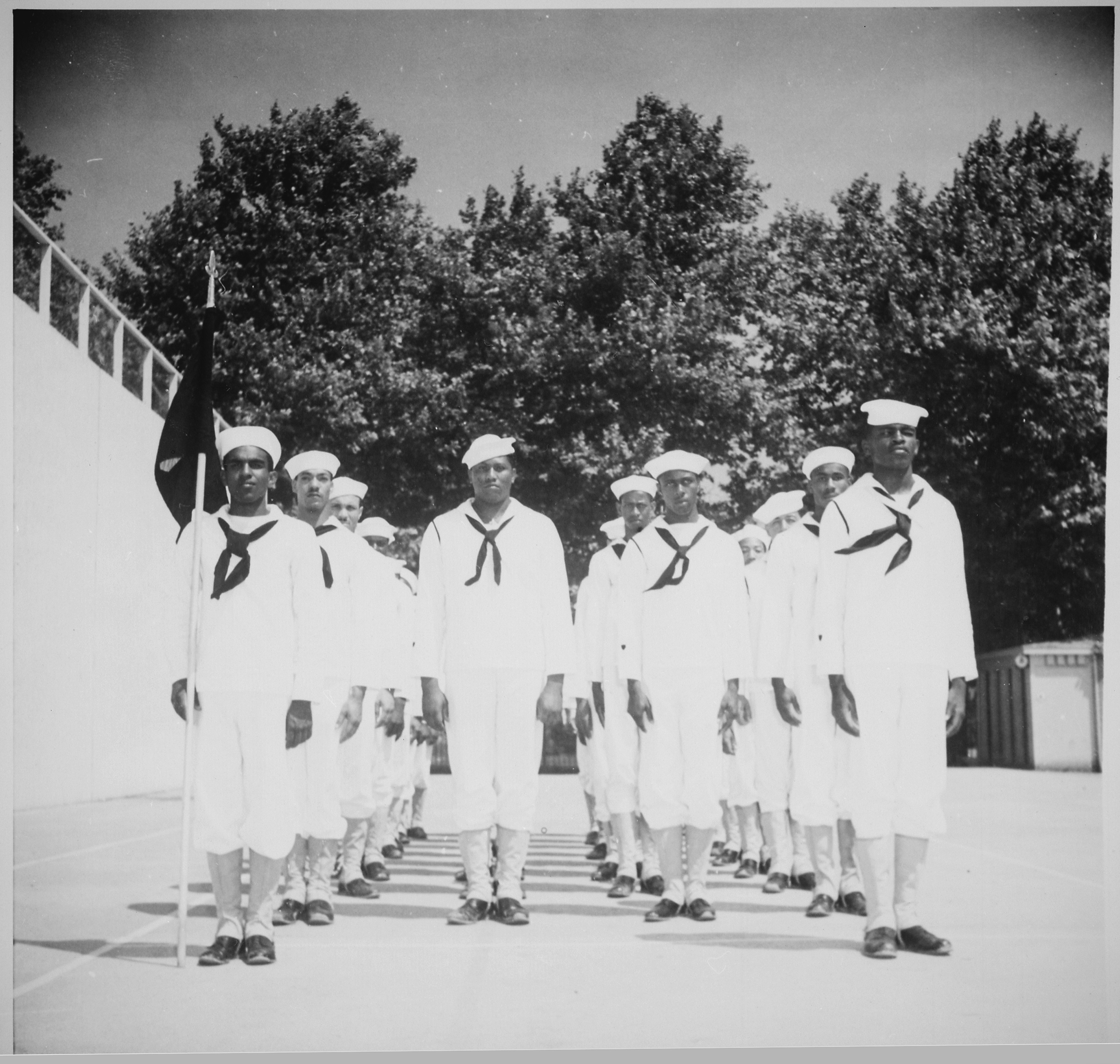
African-American recruits at Manhattan Beach Coast Guard Training Station, ca. 1941 - ca. 1945

The U.S. Coast Guard operated a training station at Manhattan Beach during World War II.

After the deterioration of the hotel industry in the area, the site of the former Manhattan Beach hotel was developed into a residential area and into Manhattan Beach Park by the New York City Parks Department. Manhattan Beach Park opened to the public in 1955, to alleviate crowding at the neighboring beaches of Coney Island and Brighton Beach, and continues to serve the public today. From 1954 to 1959, the neighborhood was home to Manhattan Beach Air Force Station. From the 1980s, Manhattan Beach has become an enclave for higher end middle class Russian Jews. The Manhattan Beach Jewish Center was listed on the National Register of Historic Places in 2015.

== Demographics ==
According to data from the 2020 United States Census, the population of Manhattan Beach was 4,684.

The neighborhood is predominantly White, comprising roughly 80% of the total population, with smaller populations of Asian (10%) and Hispanic or Latino (4%) residents.

== Political representation ==
Politically, Manhattan Beach is in New York's 8th congressional district. It is in the New York State Senate's 22nd district, the New York State Assembly's 45th district, and the New York City Council's 48th district.

== Police and crime ==
Manhattan Beach is patrolled by the 61st Precinct of the NYPD, located at 2575 Coney Island Avenue. The 61st Precinct ranked 5th safest out of 69 patrol areas for per-capita crime in 2010.

The 61st Precinct has a lower crime rate than in the 1990s, with crimes across all categories having decreased by 88.2% between 1990 and 2018. The precinct reported 1 murder, 17 rapes, 150 robberies, 170 felony assaults, 169 burglaries, 584 grand larcenies, and 72 grand larcenies auto in 2018.

== Fire safety ==
Manhattan Beach is served by the New York City Fire Department (FDNY)'s Engine Co. 246/Ladder Co. 169, located at 2732 East 11th Street.

== Education ==
=== Schools and institutes ===
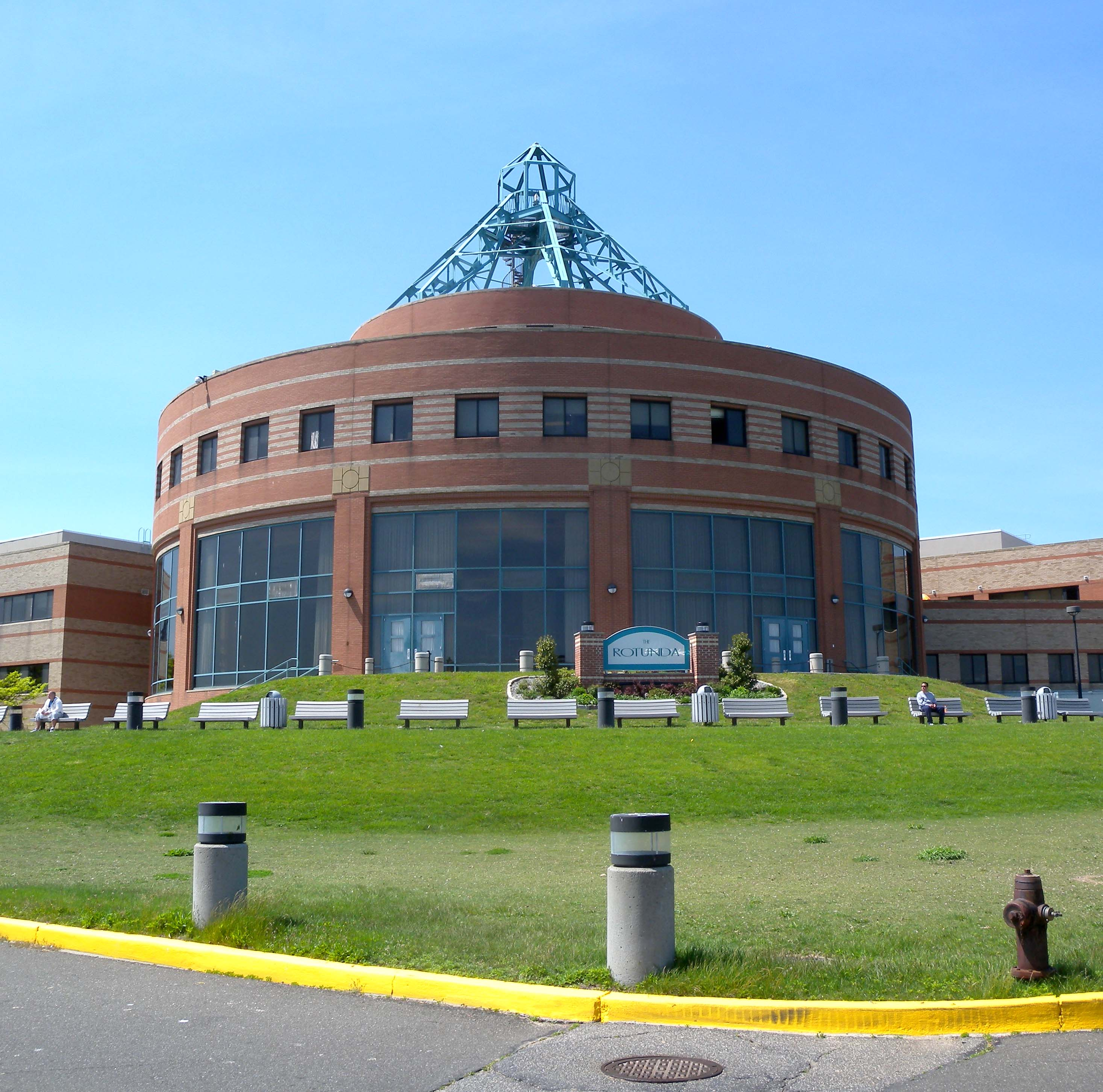
The Rotunda at Kingsborough Community College

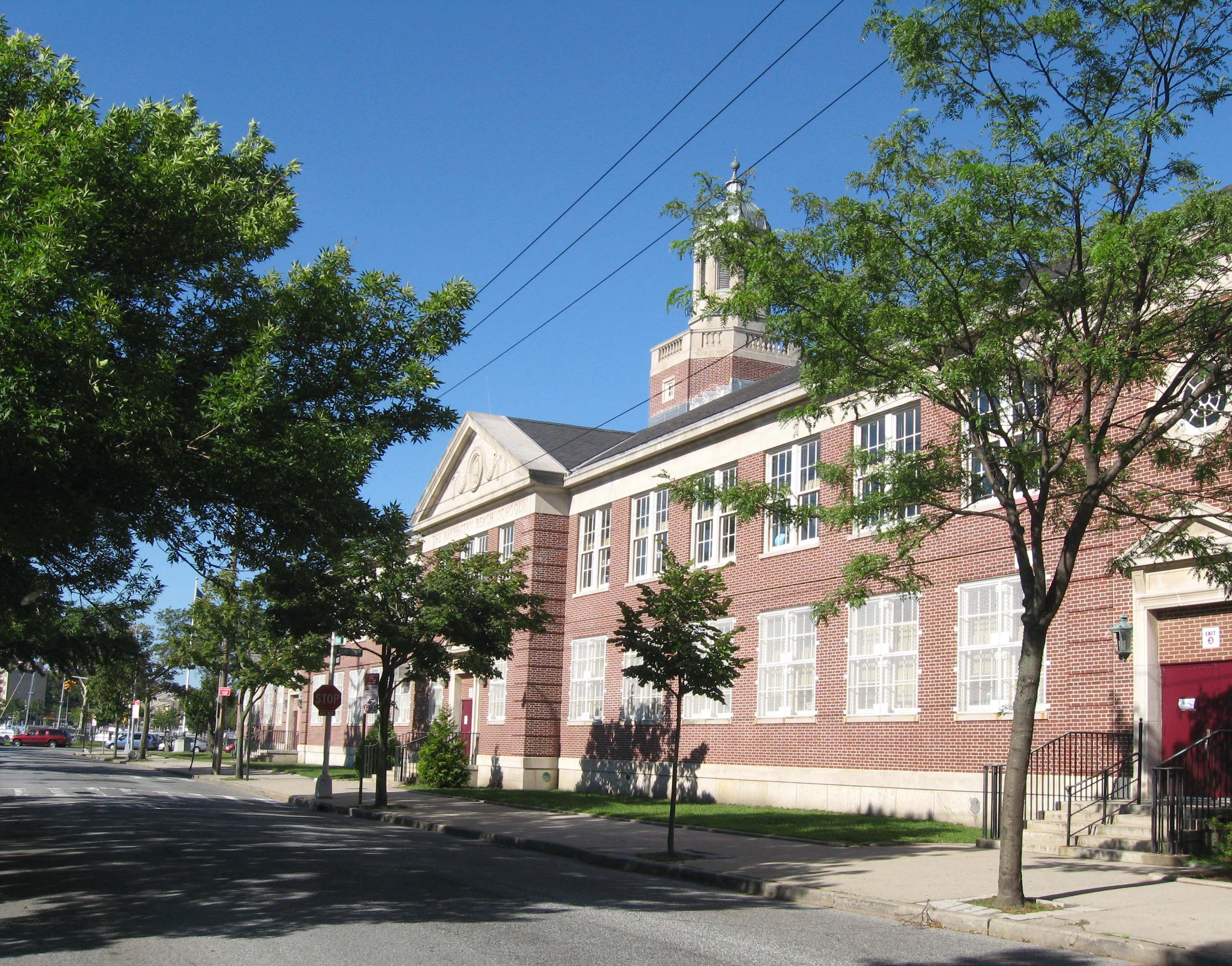
PS 195

Kingsborough Community College, which is the part of the City University of New York, occupies the entire eastern tip of Manhattan Beach. The college's halls and departments are spread out through the area. The Leon M. Goldstein High School for the Sciences is located on the campus of Kingsborough Community College.

The New York City Department of Education operates public schools in the area. Manhattan Beach is zoned to PS 195 Manhattan Beach School for grades K–5 and PS 225, the Eileen E. Zaglin School for grades pre school– middle school. In 1992, special education school PS 771K was opened at this building.

Private schools in the area include Mazel Day School, a Jewish day school for grades K–8 with a preschool in Brighton Beach, and the Yeshiva Gedolah Bais Shimon of Manhattan Beach, which is a post-high school rabbinical program.

=== Library ===
While there is no location of the Brooklyn Public Library in Manhattan Beach, the Sheepshead Bay branch nearby is located at 2636 East 14th Street, near Avenue Z.

== Transportation ==
=== Public transportation ===
Manhattan Beach is served by MTA Regional Bus Operations' B1 and B49 bus routes. Both operate along Oriental Boulevard to/from Kingsborough Community College. A stop at Emmons Avenue/Shore Boulevard at the border with Sheepshead Bay is used by the BM3, while eastbound B4 buses bypass without stopping.

=== Roads ===
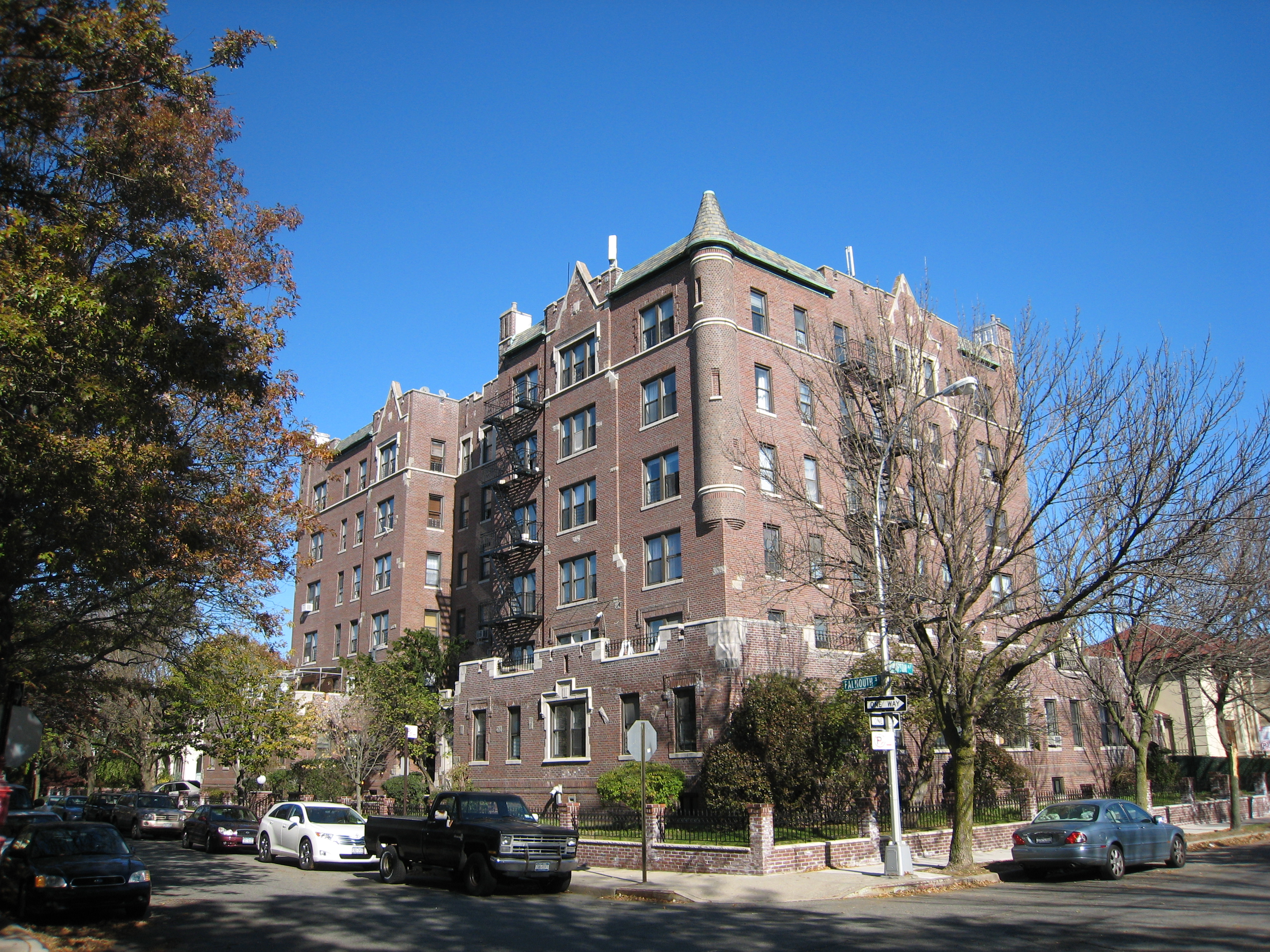
Buildings in the neighborhood

The community's street names, derived from England, are in alphabetical order from A to P. From west to east, they are named Amherst, Beaumont, Coleridge, Dover, Exeter, Falmouth, Girard, Hastings, Irwin, Jaffray, Kensington, Langham, Mackenzie, Norfolk, Oxford, and Pembroke; the names Quentin and Reynolds exist on old maps. The A-P streets are interrupted by the two-way Ocean Avenue between Exeter and Falmouth. They are bounded by Shore Boulevard and Oriental Boulevard on the north and south sides and West End Avenue on the western bottom, and are partially intersected by Hampton Avenue.

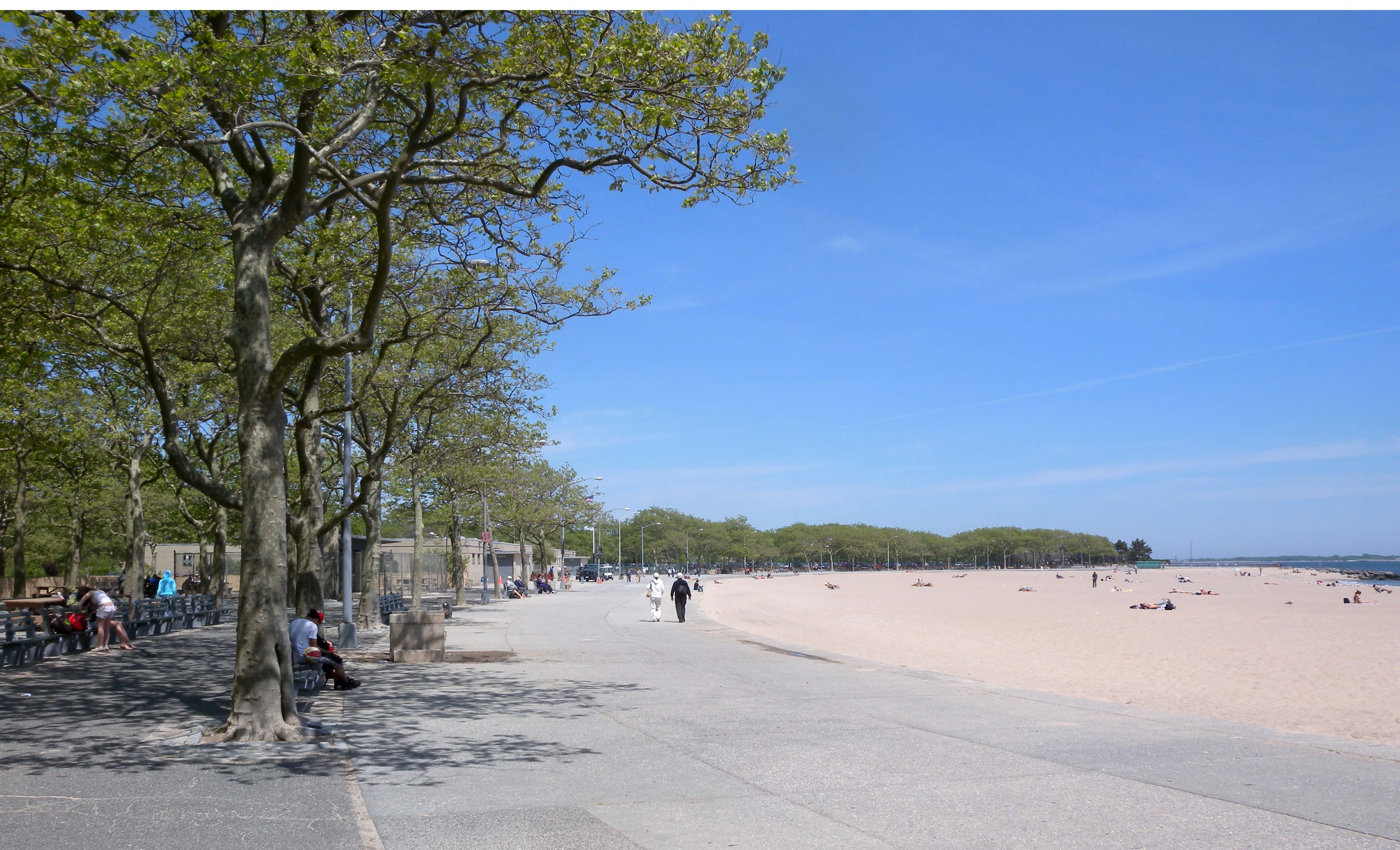
The beach, 2009.

Corbin Place was originally named for Austin Corbin, the original developer of Manhattan Beach; in 2007, it was renamed M. Corbin Place for American Revolutionary War patriot Margaret Corbin. Austin Corbin had restricted Jewish guests at his hotel and enacted restrictive covenants to prevent Jews from buying real estate in the area. After Austin Corbin's death the policy was canceled and the neighborhood attracted a large number of Jewish residents.

== Notable residents ==
Notable current and former residents of Manhattan Beach include:

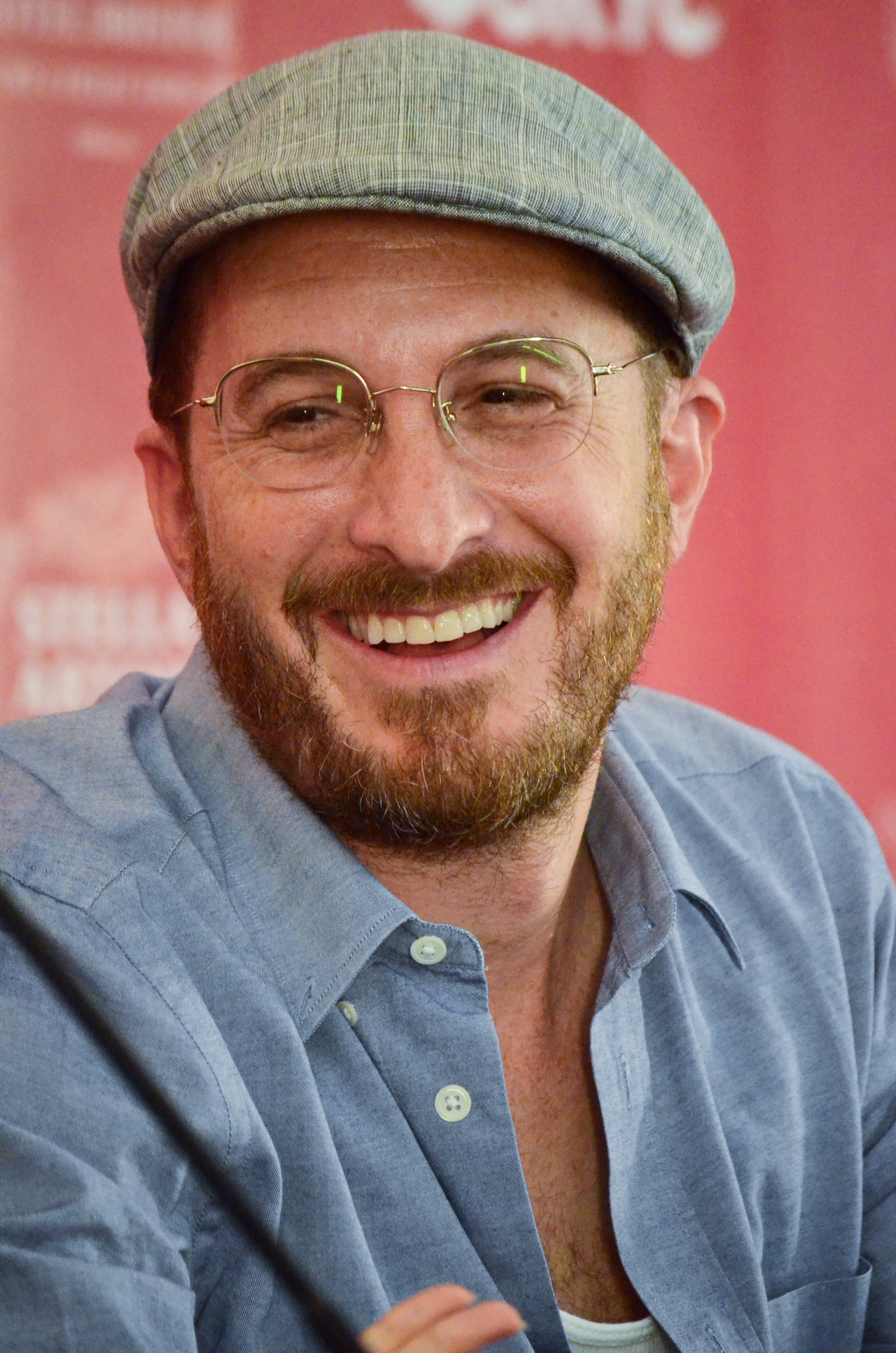
Darren Aronofsky

- Marv Albert (born 1941), sportscaster. steve Albert also lived in manhattan beach and was a ball boy for the Knicks
- Darren Aronofsky (born 1969), filmmaker
- Peter Berger (born 1950) - Co- Founder and Managing Partner Siris Capital LLC, a private equity firm
- Jay Diamond (born 1951), talk radio host who began his move to the radio by being a frequent caller to other radio programs.
- Bruce J. Katz (b. 1959), Vice President at the Brookings Institution.
- Jack Kirby (1917–1994), comic book artist who was the co-creator of Captain America and Black Panther.
- Howard L. Lasher (1944–2007), former NY State Assemblyman.
- Mell Lazarus (1927–2016), cartoonist.
- Samuel Leibowitz (1893–1978), judge, who defended Al Capone and the Scottsboro Boys as an attorney.
- William Modell (1921–2008), chairman of the Modell's Sporting Goods retail chain
- Michael Novakhov, radio host and New York State Assemblyman
- Stephen J. Solarz (1940–2010), former U.S. Congressman.

== See also ==
- Joseph P. Day, early land auctioneer
- Manhattan Beach (march) to commemorate the Manhattan Beach Park resort
