= Lynne D. Richardson =

American emergency physician

Lynne Richardson
- Born: New York, U.S.
- Education: Massachusetts Institute of Technology (BS); Yeshiva University (MD)
- Spouse: Desmond Jordan
- Children: Kristin
- Medical career
- Institutions: Icahn School of Medicine at Mount Sinai

Lynne Doreen Richardson is an American emergency physician and health services researcher. She is a professor at Icahn School of Medicine at Mount Sina and a member of the National Academy of Medicine.

== Early life and education ==
Richardson is from New York. She earned a bachelor's degree in life sciences and management from Massachusetts Institute of Technology. She completed a medical degree from Albert Einstein College of Medicine. Richardson conducted her residence in emergency medicine at Jacobi Medical Center and completed a research fellowship with AAMC Health Services Research Institute. She became board certified in Emergency Medicine in 1985.

== Career ==
Richardson is a professor of emergency medicine, health evidence, and policy at Icahn School of Medicine at Mount Sinai. She is the Vice Chair for Academic, Research and Community Programs of the Department of Emergency Medicine at Icahn.

== Awards and honors ==
Richardson was elected to membership in the National Academy of Medicine in 2016.

== Personal life ==
Richardson's daughter, Kristin Richardson Jordan, served as the New York City Councilmember for the 9th District from 2022 to 2024, covering Harlem, after winning the 2021 New York City Council election.
