= New York City's 9th City Council district =

- Boundaries following the 2020 census

Government
  - Councilmember: Yusef Salaam (D—Harlem)

Population (2010)
  - Total: 164,423

Demographics
  - Black: 48%
  - White: 24%
  - Hispanic: 20%
  - Asian: 6%
  - Other: 3%

Registration
  - Democratic: 80.3%
  - Republican: 3.1%
  - No party preference: 13.8%
- Registered voters (2021) 135,172

New York City's 9th City Council district is one of 51 districts in the New York City Council. It is currently represented by Democrat Yusef Salaam—best known for being one the Central Park Five—who took office in 2024.

== Geography ==
District 9 is based in Harlem in upper Manhattan, also covering smaller parts of East Harlem, Hamilton Heights, and Manhattanville. St. Nicholas Park and Marcus Garvey Park are both located in the district.

The district overlaps with Manhattan Community Boards 9, 10, and 11, and is contained entirely within New York's 13th congressional district. It also overlaps with the 29th, 30th, and 31st districts of the New York State Senate, and with the 68th, 69th, 70th, and 71st districts of the New York State Assembly.

With its population base in Harlem, the 9th district is the only plurality-Black district in Manhattan, and is home to what has historically been among the most politically active Black communities in the nation. Since Robert Jackson left office in 2013, the district has been the only one in the borough to be represented by a Black councilmember.

== Recent election results ==
=== 2025 ===
2025 New York City Council election, District 9
Party	Candidate	Votes	%
Democratic	Yusef Salaam (incumbent)	39,348	98.8
Write-in		462	1.2
Total votes		39,810	100.0
Democratic hold			

=== 2023 (redistricting) ===
Due to redistricting and the 2020 changes to the New York City Charter, councilmembers elected during the 2021 and 2023 City Council elections will serve two-year terms, with full four-year terms resuming after the 2025 New York City Council elections.

2023 New York City Council election, District 9 Democratic primary
Party	Candidate	Maximum round	Maximum votes	Share in maximum round	Maximum votes First round votes Transfer votes
Democratic	Yusef Salaam	4	7,058	63.9%	
Democratic	Inez Dickens	4	3,996	36.1%	
Democratic	Al Taylor	3	1,704	14.8%	
Democratic	Kristin Richardson Jordan (incumbent, withdrawn)	3	1,114	9.7%	
Write-in		1	123	1.1%	

2023 New York City Council election, District 9 general election
Party	Candidate	Votes	%
Democratic	Yusef Salaam	11,972	98.3
Write-in		201	2.7
Total votes		12,173	100.0
Democratic hold			

=== 2021 ===
In 2019, voters in New York City approved Ballot Question 1, which implemented ranked-choice voting in all local elections. Under the new system, voters have the option to rank up to five candidates for every local office. Voters whose first-choice candidates fare poorly will have their votes redistributed to other candidates in their ranking until one candidate surpasses the 50 percent threshold. If one candidate surpasses 50 percent in first-choice votes, then ranked-choice tabulations will not occur.

The 9th district was one of three districts in the city in which the eventual winner did not receive the highest number of first-choice votes (the other two being the 25th and 50th districts).

2021 New York City Council election, District 9 Democratic primary
Party	Candidate	Maximum round	Maximum votes	Share in maximum round	Maximum votes First round votes Transfer votes
Democratic	Kristin Richardson Jordan	13	9,034	50.3%	
Democratic	Bill Perkins (incumbent)	13	8,920	49.7%	
Democratic	Athena Moore	12	5,796	27.7%	
Democratic	Cordell Cleare	11	3,815	17.1%	
Democratic	Mario Rosser	10	3,002	12.8%	
Democratic	William Allen	9	2,125	8.8%	
Democratic	Keith Taylor	8	1,808	7.4%	
Democratic	Joshua Clennon	7	1,559	6.3%	
Democratic	Ruth McDaniels	6	1,142	4.6%	
Democratic	Pierre Gooding	5	802	3.2%	
Democratic	Billy Council	4	758	3.0%	
Democratic	Sheba Simpson-Amsterdam	3	604	2.4%	
Democratic	Bernadette McNear	2	335	1.3%	
Write-in		1	47	0.2%	

An interactive map of District 9

2021 New York City Council election, District 9 general election
Party	Candidate	Votes	%
Democratic	Kristin Richardson Jordan	24,169	93.8
Republican	Alpheaus Marcus	1,475	5.7
Write-in		99	0.5
Total votes		25,743	100
Democratic hold			

=== 2017 ===
2017 New York City Council election, District 9
Primary election
Party	Candidate	Votes	%
Democratic	Bill Perkins (incumbent)	7,630	49.9
Democratic	Marvin Holland	2,997	19.6
Democratic	Cordell Cleare	2,670	17.5
Democratic	Tyson-Lord Gray	1,275	8.3
Democratic	Marvin Spruill	360	2.4
Democratic	Julius Tajiddin	297	1.9
Write-in		71	0.4
Total votes		15,300	100
General election
Democratic	Bill Perkins	20,759	
Working Families	Bill Perkins	1,073	
Total	Bill Perkins (incumbent)	21,832	78.2
Liberal	Tyson-Lord Gray	3,615	12.9
Harlem Matters	Dianne Mack	1,230	4.4
Republican	Jack Royster	687	2.5
Reform	Pierre Gooding	481	1.7
Write-in		79	0.3
Total votes		27,924	100
Democratic hold			

=== 2017 special ===
In 2016, Councilwoman Inez Dickens was elected to the 70th district of the New York State Assembly, triggering a February 2017 special election for her seat. Like all municipal special elections in New York City, the race was officially nonpartisan, with all candidates running on ballot lines of their own creation.

2017 New York City Council special election, District 9
Party	Candidate	Votes	%
Community First	Bill Perkins	3,933	34.0
Holland4Harlem	Marvin Holland	2,129	18.4
We Are One	Athena Moore	1,715	14.8
Harlem Family	Larry Scott Blackmon	1,371	11.8
Time to Wake Up	Cordell Cleare	1,101	9.5
Rent Too Damn High	Dawn Simmons	314	
Dawn for Harlem	Dawn Simmons	282	
Total	Dawn Simmons	596	5.1
Building Harlem	Charles Cooper	353	3.0
Harlem Voices	Todd Stevens	184	1.6
Educated Leader	Caprice Alves	173	1.5
Write-in		28	0.3
Total votes		11,583	100

=== 2013 ===
2013 New York City Council election, District 9
Primary election
Party	Candidate	Votes	%
Democratic	Inez Dickens (incumbent)	12,878	69.9
Democratic	Vincent Morgan	5,525	30.0
Write-in		9	0.1
Total votes		18,412	100
General election
Democratic	Inez Dickens (incumbent)	23,454	99.1
Write-in		222	0.9
Total votes		23,676	100
Democratic hold			
