= Yusef Salaam =

American activist and politician (born 1974)

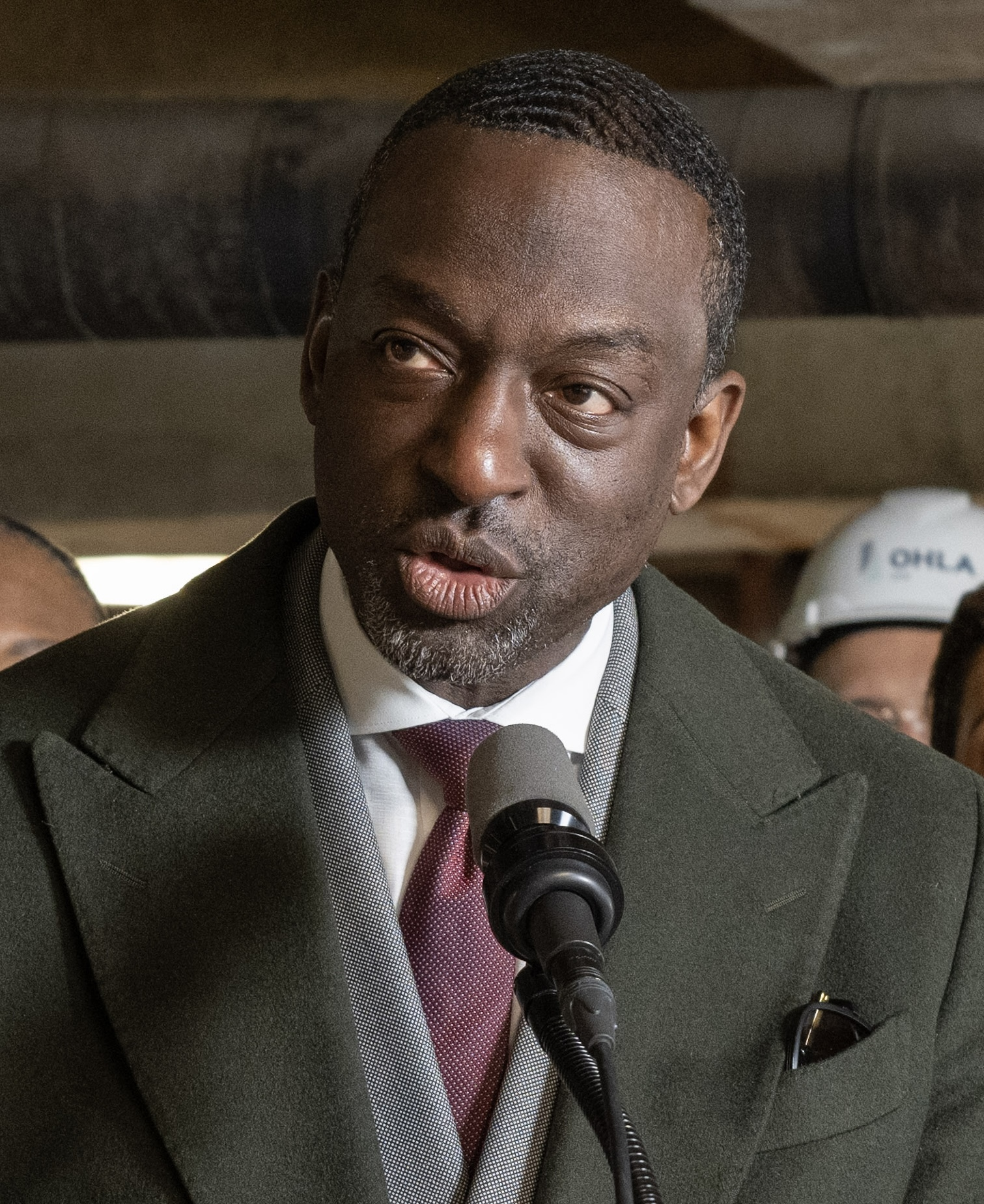
- Salaam in 2026

Member of the New York City Council from the 9th district
- Incumbent
- Assumed office January 1, 2024
- Preceded by: Kristin Richardson Jordan

Personal details
- Born: February 27, 1974 (age 52) New York City, U.S.
- Party: Democratic
- Children: 10
- Education: Dutchess Community College; Hunter College

Yusef Salaam (born 1974) is an American politician, motivational speaker, and activist currently serving as a member of the New York City Council, representing the city's 9th council district since 2024. A member of the Democratic Party, Salaam, one of the Central Park Five, was wrongly convicted of acting in concert to rape a woman in Central Park in 1989. His conviction was vacated in 2002.

== Early life ==
Salaam was born in 1974 in New York City to Sharonne Salaam. He was born into a Muslim household and raised by a religious grandmother and mother who emphasized faith and spirituality. His mother exposed him and his siblings to books about different countries as well as different languages.

=== Central Park jogger case and conviction ===
On April 19, 1989, Trisha Meili, a woman jogging in Central Park, was assaulted and raped by Matias Reyes. (Note: In September 2002, Reyes came forward to state that he raped Meili. DNA tests confirmed that semen on the jogger's sock matched Reyes's, although the Central Park Five had already served out their sentence by the time he was convicted.) Authorities accused Salaam, Korey Wise, Kevin Richardson, Antron McCray and Raymond Santana of assaulting her; the five teenagers—of Black and Latino race—became known as the "Central Park Five," later the "Exonerated Five." At the time, Salaam was 15. The teenagers confessed to assaulting her, but later claimed the confessions were the result of beatings and threats by police officers. Salaam later claimed that police had deprived the teenagers of "food, drink or sleep" for more than a day. All five were convicted in 1990. His conviction was upheld by the Appellate Division, and was again upheld in 1993 by the Court of Appeals of the State of New York. He was released from prison in 1997. His conviction was vacated in 2002 and in 2014 New York City paid $41 million to settle a civil rights lawsuit brought by the Central Park Five.

=== Faith during imprisonment ===
While imprisoned, Salaam deepened his connection to Islam, later stating that his faith helped him endure his sentence and shaped his outlook on justice. In an interview with Yaqeen Institute for Islamic Research, he states the Quran was his way of understanding why he was imprisoned after being falsely accused, understanding the Quran as the manual of life. In this interview he also said when he was imprisoned he would look at parallels between himself and the Quran, like the story of Prophet Yusuf (as) in the Quran. Salaam's grandmother would send him letters to ensure that he remembered that there were people who loved him.

During the interview with Yaqeen Institute for Islamic Research, Yusef Salaam said he got closer to Allah when he was in prison. Salaam served as the imam of the youth facility for five years. After being transferred to an adult facility, he served as the Qadi (religious judge) of the Muslim community for about a year and a half, and later as the Naib (assistant or deputy leader) before his release.

== Career ==
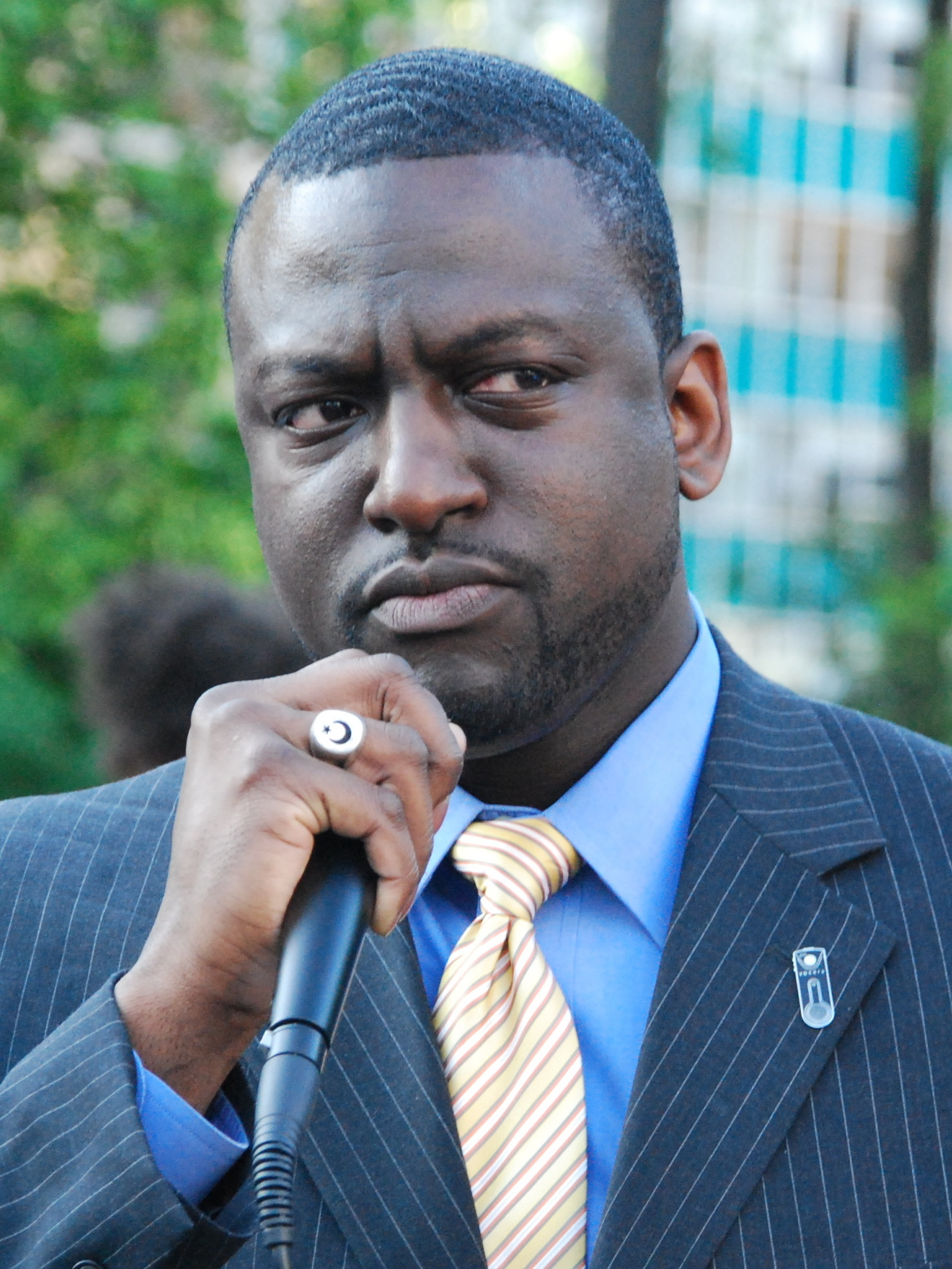
Salaam speaking at a 2009 rally.

Following his release in 1997, Salaam worked as a construction worker in an apartment complex in the Mitchell–Lama Housing Program on Adam Clayton Powell Jr. Boulevard. He was fired after the company discovered who he was. Salaam then worked at Weill Cornell Medicine. He has served on the board of the Innocence Project.

In 2021, Salaam considered running for the New York State Legislature, but decided against it due to residency requirements. Salaam moved back to New York City from Georgia in 2022. On February 4, 2023, Salaam announced his candidacy for the 9th City Council District of New York City representing Harlem in the 2023 elections. During the campaign, he was endorsed by Cornel West. He won the Democratic primary on July 5 defeating assemblymembers Inez Dickens and Al Taylor. He was unopposed in the general election and succeeded councilwoman Kristin Richardson Jordan for a term ending January 1, 2026. He was re-elected in November 2025.

In January 2024, Salaam's car, which had Georgia license plates and dark-tinted windows that are illegal in New York, was stopped in Harlem by a New York City police car. When the officer approached his car, Salaam said he was a member of the city council and that he was on city business. He was on a business call with several of his colleagues including City Council member Sandy Nurse, who heard the entire police interaction. He was driving to dinner with his wife and four of his children. Salaam asked why he had been stopped but the officer, on hearing that he was a council member on business, cut off the interaction and walked away saying, "Take care, sir." Officers are not required to give a reason for stopping a car, but Salaam said the police should have done so voluntarily. Critics of Salaam said he smeared the police and used his position to get out of a possible ticket.

In the aftermath of the second 2024 presidential debate, Salaam confronted former president Donald Trump who previously called for Salaam to be executed, but Trump refused to walk back his statements.

== Personal life ==
Salaam is a practicing Muslim. He has ten children, three of whom are stepchildren. In 2016, he received a Lifetime Achievement Award from then-president Barack Obama. In 2021, Salaam was awarded the Muhammad Ali Confident Muslim of the Year by the Yaqeen Institute for Islamic Research.

In film, Salaam is featured in documentarian Ken Burns's film The Central Park Five (2012). He is portrayed as an adult by Chris Chalk and as a child by Ethan Herisse in filmmaker Ava DuVernay's television miniseries When They See Us. In 2022, "Gate of the Exonerated" was dedicated at the northern end of Central Park in honor of Salaam and the other members of the Exonerated Five.

== Electoral history ==
=== 2025 ===
2025 New York City Council election, District 9
Party	Candidate	Votes	%
Democratic	Yusef Salaam (incumbent)	39,348	98.8
Write-in		465	1.2
Total votes		39,813	100.0
Democratic hold			

=== 2023 ===
2023 New York City Council Democratic primary, District 9
Party	Candidate	Maximum round	Maximum votes	Share in maximum round	Maximum votes First round votes Transfer votes
Democratic	Yusef Salaam	4	7,058	63.9%	
Democratic	Inez Dickens	4	3,996	36.1%	
Democratic	Al Taylor	3	1,704	14.8%	
Democratic	Kristin Richardson Jordan (incumbent, withdrawn)	3	1,114	9.7%	
Write-In		1	123	1.1%	

2025 New York City Council election, District 9
Party	Candidate	Votes	%
Democratic	Yusef Salaam	11,972	98.3
Write-in		201	1.7
Total votes		12,173	100.0
Democratic hold			

== Selected works ==
- Salaam, Yusef (2021). Better, Not Bitter: Living on Purpose in the Pursuit of Racial Justice. New York City: Grand Central Publishing. ISBN 9781538704981.
- Salaam, Yusef (October 12, 2016). "I'm one of the Central Park Five. Donald Trump won't leave me alone". The Washington Post.
