= Central Park jogger case =

1989 crime in New York City

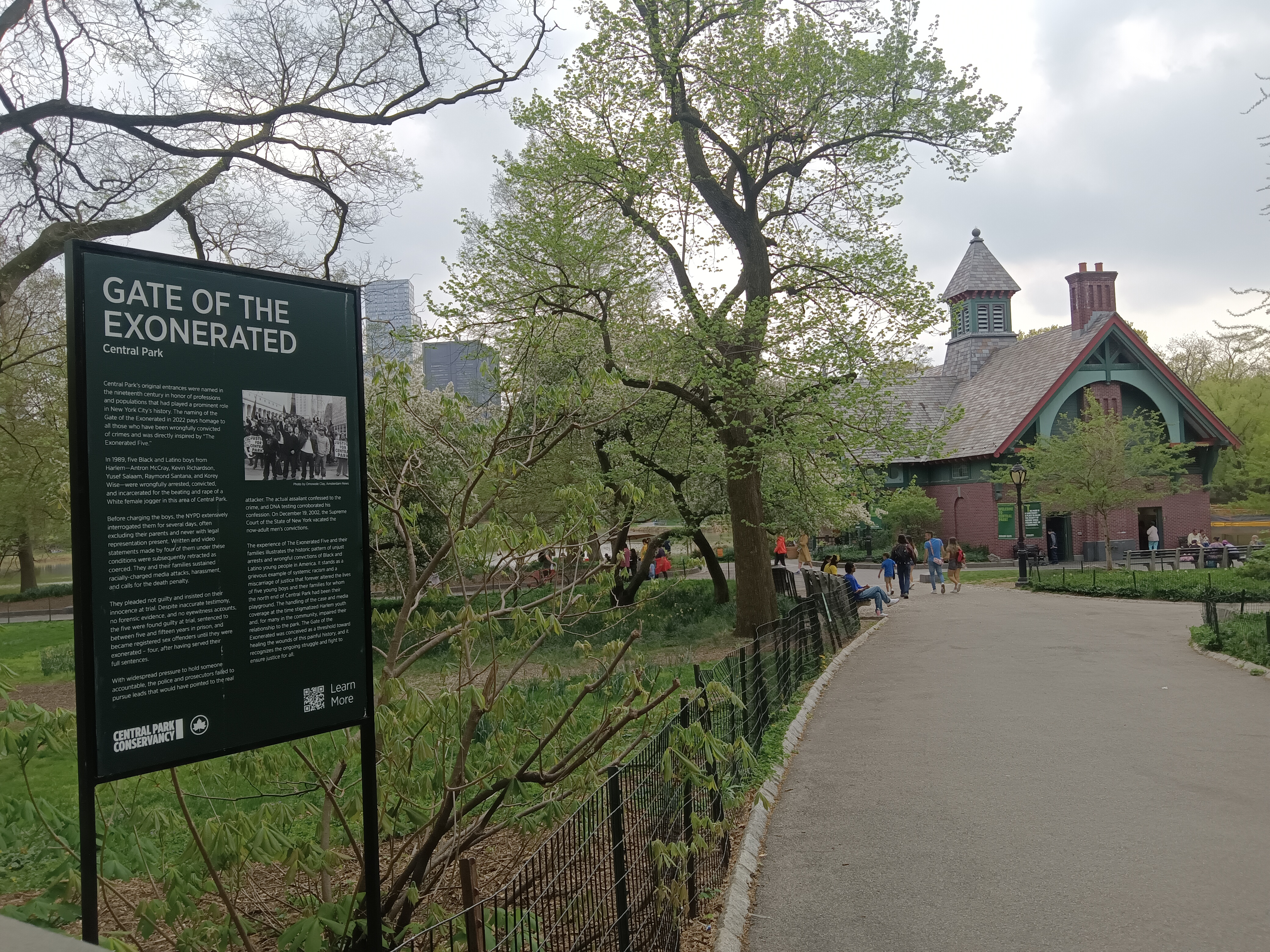
- Central Park sign honoring the exonerated
- Location: Central Park, New York City
- Date: April 19, 1989; 9:00–10:00 p.m. (EDT; UTC−04:00)
- Attack type: Rape
- Injuries: Trisha Meili
- Perpetrator: Matias Reyes
- Verdict: Kevin Richardson, Antron McCray, Yusef Salaam, Raymond Santana, Korey Wise exonerated in 2002; Steven Lopez exonerated in 2022
- Litigation: Lawsuit against New York City settled for $41 million in 2014; Lawsuit against New York State settled for $3.9 million in 2016

The Central Park jogger case (sometimes termed as the Central Park Five case) was a criminal case concerning the assault and rape of Trisha Meili, a woman who was running in Central Park in Manhattan, New York City, on April 19, 1989. Crime in New York City was peaking in the late 1980s and early 1990s as the crack epidemic surged. On the night Meili was attacked, dozens of teenagers had entered the park, and there were reports of muggings and physical assaults.

Six teenagers were indicted in relation to the Meili assault. They also faced additional charges related to the other attacks that night. Charges against one, Steven Lopez, were dropped after Lopez pleaded guilty to a different assault against John Loughlin. The remaining five—Antron McCray, Kevin Richardson, Yusef Salaam, Raymond Santana, and Korey Wise (known as the Central Park Five, later the Exonerated Five)—were convicted of the charged offenses and served sentences ranging from seven to thirteen years.

In 2002, serial rapist Matias Reyes confessed to the Meili assault and said he was the only actor, with DNA evidence confirming his confession. The convictions, including those related to the other assaults, against McCray, Richardson, Salaam, Santana, and Wise were vacated in 2002; Lopez's convictions were vacated in July 2022.

From the outset the case was a topic of national interest. Initially, it fueled public discourse about New York City's perceived lawlessness, criminal behavior by youths, and violence toward women. After the exonerations, the case became a prominent example of racial profiling, discrimination, and inequality in the legal system and the media. All five defendants sued the City of New York for malicious prosecution, racial discrimination, and emotional distress; the city settled the suit in 2014 for US$41 million (equivalent to $55 million in 2025).

== Attacks ==
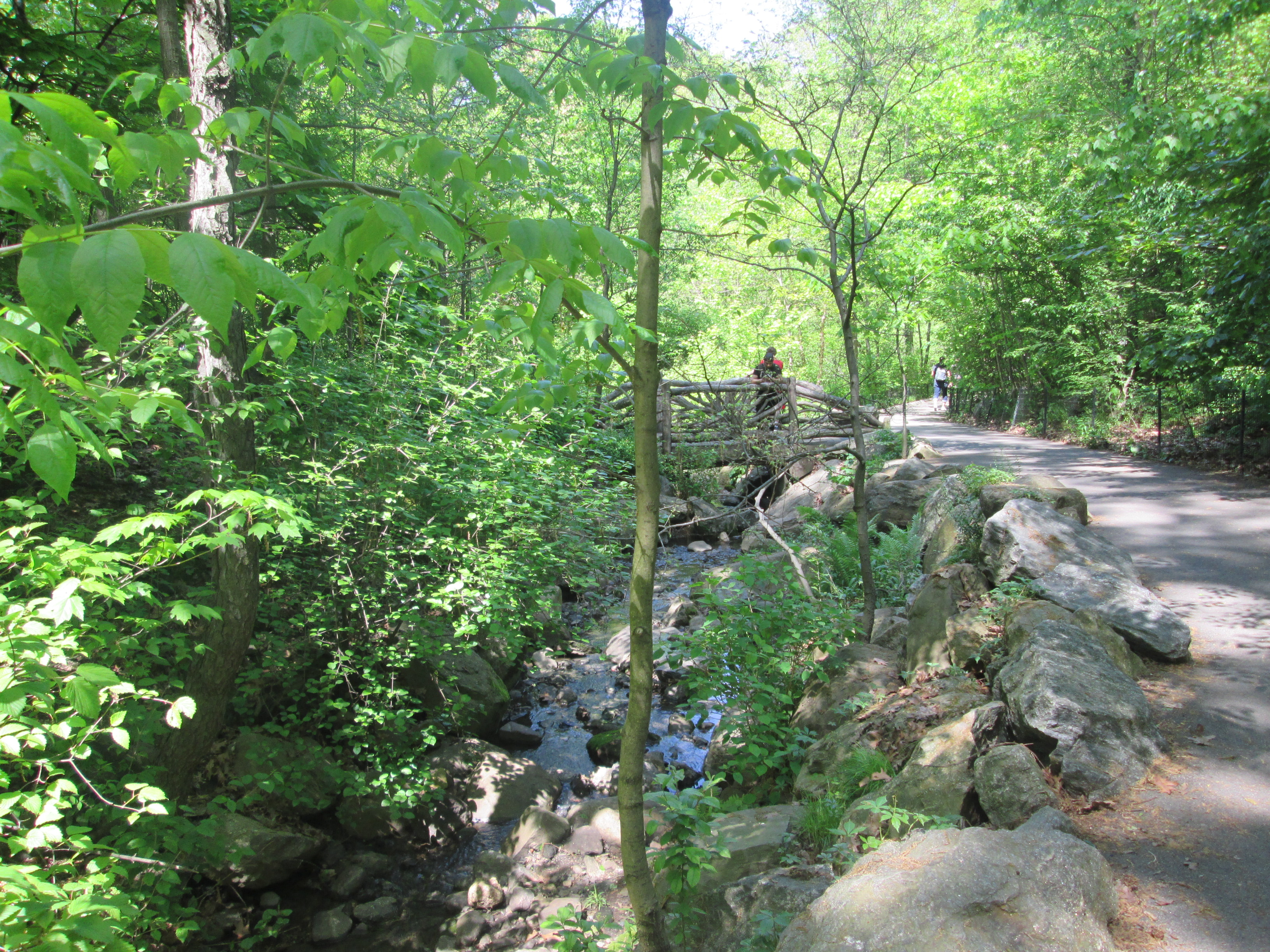
North Woods, one of several places where crimes were reported

At 9:00 p.m. on April 19, 1989, a group of an estimated 20 to 32 teenagers who lived in East Harlem entered Manhattan's Central Park at an entrance in Harlem, near Central Park North. Some of the group committed several attacks, assaults, and robberies against people who were either walking, biking, or jogging in the northernmost part of the park near the reservoir, and victims began to report the incidents to police.

Within the North Woods, between 102nd and 105th Street, assailants were reported attacking several cyclists, hurling rocks at a cab, and attacking a pedestrian. The teenagers roamed south along the park's East Drive and the 97th Street transverse, between 9:00 and 10:00 p.m. Police attempted to apprehend suspects after crimes began to be reported between 9:00 and 10:00 p.m. Michael Vigna, a competitive bike rider, testified that, at about 9:05 p.m., he was hassled by a group of boys, one of whom tried to punch him. At about 9:15 p.m., Antonio Diaz, who had been walking in the park near 105th Street, was knocked to the ground by teenagers, who stole his bag of food and bottle of beer. And Gerald Malone and Patricia Dean, riding on a tandem, said that a group of boys tried to block their path on East Drive south of 102nd Street at about 9:15 p.m.; Malone said that he and Dean sped towards the boys, causing them to scatter, though Dean said that a few grabbed at her; the couple called police after reaching a call box.

At least some of the group of teenagers traveled farther south to the area around the reservoir, and, there, four male joggers were "set upon" between 9:25 and 9:50 p.m. David Lewis testified that he was attacked and robbed about 9:25–9:40 p.m. Robert Garner said he was assaulted at about 9:30 p.m. David Good testified he was attacked at about 9:47 p.m. And, between 9:40 and 9:50 p.m., John Loughlin was "knocked to the ground, kicked, punched, and beaten with a pipe and stick"; he sustained "significant but not life-threatening injuries". At a pretrial hearing in October 1989, a police officer testified that when Loughlin was found, he was bleeding so badly that he "looked like he was dunked in a bucket of blood".

=== Rape of Trisha Meili ===
Map of north half of Central Park within Manhattan, showing the approximate location where Trisha Meili was found after being assaulted

Patricia "Trisha" Ellen Meili, a 28-year-old, was going for a regular run in Central Park shortly before 9:00 p.m. While jogging, she was knocked down, dragged nearly 300 feet (91 m) off the roadway, and violently physically and sexually assaulted. About four hours later at 1:30 am, she was found naked, gagged, tied, and covered in mud and blood in a shallow ravine about 300 feet north of the 102nd Street Crossing, a wooded area of the park. The first policeman who saw her said: "She was beaten as badly as anybody I've ever seen beaten. She looked like she was tortured." Meili was so badly injured that she was in a coma for 12 days, not awakening until May 1, according to a May 3 interview with her doctor.

She had severe hypothermia, severe brain damage, severe hemorrhagic shock, loss of 75–80 percent of her blood, and internal bleeding. Her skull had been fractured so badly that her left eye was dislodged from its socket, which in turn was fractured in 21 places.

Meili was not identified for about 24 hours, and it took days for the police to retrace her movements of that night. By the time of the trial of the first three suspects in June 1990, The New York Times characterized the attack on the jogger as "one of the most widely publicized crimes of the 1980's".

== Arrests and investigation ==
=== Arrests of Lopez, McCray, Richardson, Salaam, Santana and Wise ===
Police took custody of Raymond Santana and Kevin Richardson, both 14 years of age, at approximately 10:15 p.m. on Central Park West and 102nd Street. Steven Lopez, 15, was also arrested within an hour of several other attacks being reported to police. He was also interrogated.

Antron McCray and Yusef Salaam, both 15 years of age, were brought in for questioning later that day (April 20). They had been identified by other youths as participants in, or present at, attacks on other victims in Central Park. Korey Wise (then known as Kharey Wise), 16, accompanied Salaam for questioning, because they were friends, but was questioned himself.

Four of the six suspects, Salaam, Wise, Richardson, and Lopez, lived at the Schomburg Plaza, a mixed-income housing complex at the northeast corner of Central Park; two lived further north of there.

Analysis indicated that none of the suspects' DNA matched either of the two DNA samples collected from the crime scene (from the jogger's cervix and running sock), but results were reported as "inconclusive" by the police.

==== Confessions ====
The videotaped confessions started on April 21, after the detectives finished unrecorded interrogations during which the suspects were in custody for at least seven hours. Santana, McCray, and Richardson made video statements in the presence of parents. Wise made several statements unaccompanied by any parent, guardian or counsel. Lopez was interviewed on videotape in the presence of his parents on April 21, 1989, beginning at 3:30 a.m. He named others of the group by first names in the group attacks on other persons but denied any knowledge of the female jogger. None of the six had defense attorneys during the interrogations or videotape process. McCray, Richardson, Salaam, Santana and Wise told police they had been part of a makeshift group of about 30 people, some of whom had committed various crimes, some of whom had merely observed those crimes. According to a later statement by District Attorney Nancy Ryan, "[a]ll five implicated themselves in a number of the crimes which had occurred in the park."

While the accounts offered of the crimes beside the rape were accurate, their accounts of the rape contained discrepancies as to "when, where and how it happened." Only Wise made any statement about the different times and locations of the jogger attack, but detectives had taken Wise to the park, providing him details and direct observations of the crime scene, before he made his videotaped confession. None of the five said that he had raped the jogger, but each confessed to having been an accomplice—each youth said that he had only helped restrain the jogger, or touched her sexually, while one or more others had raped her. Their confessions varied as to who they identified as having participated in the rape, including naming several youths who were never questioned. In his untaped confession, Salaam went the furthest in admitting some culpability, claiming to have struck the jogger with a pipe at the beginning of the incident.

Although four suspects, all except Lopez and Salaam, confessed on videotape in the presence of a parent or guardian (who had generally not been present during the interrogations), each of the four retracted his statement within weeks. Together they claimed that they had been intimidated, lied to, and coerced by police into making false confessions. While the confessions were videotaped, the hours of interrogation that preceded the confessions were not.

When taken into custody, Salaam told the police he was 16 years old and showed them identification to that effect. If a suspect had reached 16 years of age, his parents or guardians no longer had a right to accompany him during police questioning, or to refuse to permit him to answer any questions. After Salaam's mother arrived at the station, she insisted that she wanted a lawyer for her son, and the police stopped the questioning. He neither made a videotape nor signed the earlier written statement, but the court ruled to accept it as evidence before his trial. Detective Tom McKenna falsely told Salaam that his fingerprints had been found on the victim's clothing; McKenna reported that Salaam subsequently confessed to being present at the scene of the rape. Years later, Salaam said, "I would hear them beating up Korey Wise in the next room", and "they would come and look at me and say: 'You realize you're next.' The fear made me feel really like I was not going to be able to make it out."

Two weeks after their confessions, each of the suspects recanted. They argued that their statements were coerced by police and that their rights to counsel and Miranda warnings had been violated.

=== April 21 press conference ===
On April 21, senior police investigators held a press conference to announce having apprehended about 20 suspects in the attacks of a total of nine people in Central Park two nights before and began to offer their theory of the attack and rape of the female jogger. Her name was withheld as a victim of a sex crime. The police said up to 12 youths were believed to have attacked the jogger.

New York City senior detectives said the term "wilding" was used by the suspects when describing their actions to police. This account of the term "wilding" was soon disputed by investigative reporter Barry Michael Cooper, who said that it originated in a police detective's misunderstanding of the suspects' use of the phrase "doing the wild thing", lyrics from rapper Tone Loc's hit song "Wild Thing".

== Media coverage ==
At a time of concern about crime in general in the city, which was suffering high rates of assaults, rapes, and homicides, these attacks provoked great outrage, particularly the brutal rape of the female jogger. It took place in the public park that is "mythologized as the city's verdant, democratic refuge". New York Governor Mario Cuomo told the New York Post: "This is the ultimate shriek of alarm."

Normal police procedures stipulated that the names of criminal suspects under the age of 16 were to be withheld from the media and the public. But this policy was ignored when the names of the arrested juveniles were released to the press before any of them had been formally arraigned or indicted. For example, the name of Kharey Wise (he later adopted the use of Korey as his first name) was published in an April 25, 1989, article in the Philadelphia Daily News about the attack on the female jogger.

By that time, more information had been published about the primary suspects in the rape, who did not seem to satisfy typical profiles of perpetrators. Reporters had found that some came from stable, financially secure families; police had ruled out drugs or major robbery, and most had no criminal records. On April 26, 1989, The New York Times published a cautionary editorial against the use of labels and questioning why such "well-adjusted youngsters" could have committed such a "savage" crime.

After the major media's decisions to print the names, photos, and addresses of the juvenile suspects, they and their families received serious threats. Other residents living at the Schomburg Plaza, where four suspects lived, were also threatened. Because of this, editors of The City Sun and the Amsterdam News chose to use Meili's name in their continuing coverage of the events. Reverend Calvin O. Butts of the Abyssinian Baptist Church in Harlem, who came to support the five suspects, said to The New York Times, "The first thing you do in the United States of America when a white woman is raped is round up a bunch of black youths, and I think that's what happened here."

In most media accounts of the incident at that time, Meili was simply referred to as the "Central Park Jogger", but two local TV stations violated the media policy of not publicly identifying the victims of sex crimes and released her name in the days immediately following the attack. Two newspapers aimed at the African American community—The City Sun and the Amsterdam News—and the black-owned talk radio station WLIB continued to cover the case as it progressed. Their editors said this was in response to the media having publicized the names and personal information about the five suspects, who were all minors, before they were arraigned. The Open Line hosts on WRKS were credited with helping continue to cover the case until the convicted youths were cleared in 2002 of the crime.

=== Donald Trump advertisement ===
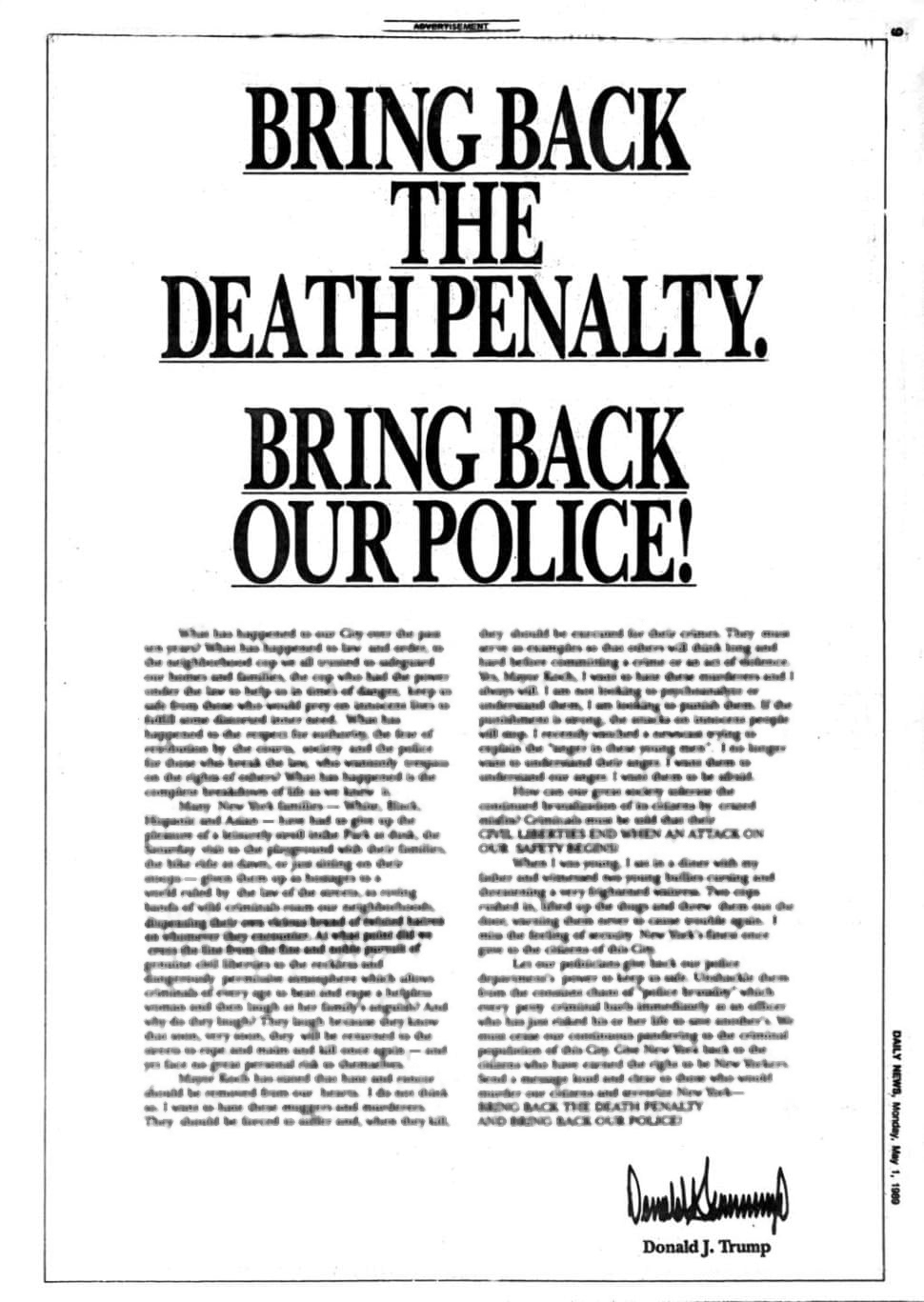
The full-page advertisement was taken out by Donald Trump in the May 1, 1989, issue of the Daily News.

About ten days after the boys started to confess, real estate magnate Donald Trump called on May 1, 1989, for the return of the death penalty for murder in full-page advertisements published in all four of the city's major newspapers. Trump said he wanted the "criminals of every age to be afraid". The advertisement, which cost an estimated US$85,000 (equivalent to $221,000 in 2025), said, in part,

Many New York families - White, Black, Hispanic and Asian - have had to give up the pleasure of a leisurely stroll in the Park at dusk, the Saturday visit to the playground with their families, the bike ride at dawn, or just sitting on their stoops.... Mayor Koch has stated that hate and rancor should be removed from our hearts. I do not think so. I want to hate these muggers and murderers. They should be forced to suffer ... Yes, Mayor Koch, I want to hate these murderers and I always will. ... How can our great society tolerate the continued brutalization of its citizens by crazed misfits? Criminals must be told that their Civil Liberties End When an Attack On Our Safety Begins!

The New York Times has pointed out that, "The ad does not name any defendant, instead referring collectively to ‘roving bands of wild criminals.'" As to the particular defendants in this case, Trump said in 2002 that he greatly respected District Attorney Morgenthau, and was "sure the right answer will come out." However, in 2016, Trump said, "They admitted they were guilty….The fact that that case was settled with so much evidence against them is outrageous." CNN assesses that, "Trump obviously still believes that the Central Park 5 are guilty, so it cannot be said he is lying or even misleading", though his opinion is contrary to the financial settlement in 2014.

According to a contemporaneous article in the New York Amsterdam News, the ad was "widely condemned", including by then-Mayor Koch. Colin Moore, one of the attorneys defending one of the Central Park defendants, said that the ad "proved that anything is possible in America", and that "even a fool can become a multi-millionaire." According to defendant Yusef Salaam, quoted in a February 2016 article in The Guardian, Trump "was the fire starter" in 1989, as "common citizens were being manipulated and swayed into believing that we were guilty." Salaam said his family received death threats after papers ran Trump's full-page ad urging the death penalty.

== 1989–1991 criminal actions ==
On May 10, 1989, Lopez, McCray, Richardson, Salaam, Santana, and Wise were indicted with attempted murder and other charges in the attack on and rape of the female jogger and additional charges related to the attack of David Lewis, the attack and robbery of John Loughlin, and riot. (Note: Michael Briscoe, 17, was initially arrested for the rape of the female jogger, but his indictment was for riot and assault related to the attack of David Lewis, one of the four male joggers near the reservoir. In May 1990, he pleaded guilty to assault and was sentenced to a year in prison.) The prosecution arranged to try the six defendants in the Meili case in two separate groups. This enabled them to control the order in which certain evidence would be introduced to the court.

Each pleaded "not guilty". The families of Lopez, Richardson, and Salaam were able to make the $25,000 bail imposed by the court. The two other youths under 16 were returned to a juvenile facility to be held there until trial. Classified as an adult at 16, Korey Wise was separated from the others and held in an adult jail at Rikers Island until trial.

=== Pre-trial hearings ===
Numerous pretrial hearings were conducted by Judge Thomas B. Galligan of the State Supreme Court of Manhattan, who had been assigned the case. Since 1986, judges were generally assigned by lottery, but the court administrator assigned him to this case. The defense attorneys criticized Galligan as being biased in favor of the assistant district attorney and handing down tough sentences. The counsel of the defendants filed a motion for a different judge which was rejected.

Defendants challenged the use of the videotaped confessions and statements, arguing that the confessions were coerced and that they had not been properly Mirandized. Salaam argued that his statement should be suppressed because it was made outside of the presence of his parents, despite the fact that New York law entitled children fifteen and younger to have their parents with them during the interrogation process. Galligan ruled that the statements were admissible—finding that they were made voluntarily. In Salaam's case, Galligan found that Salaam had lied to the police about his age—telling them he was 16—and held that Salaam should not be able to derive a benefit from the falsehood.

=== Trials ===
==== First trial ====
In the first trial, which began June 25 and ended on August 18, 1990, defendants Antron McCray, Yusef Salaam, and Raymond Santana were tried. Each of the teenagers had his own defense counsel. The jury consisted of four white Americans, four black Americans, three Hispanic Americans, and one Asian American. Meili testified at the trial, but her identity was not given to the court. None of the three defense attorneys cross-examined her. Meili was continually harassed by protesters during the case, both in the halls of the court and in the courtroom itself, who yelled obscenities at her such as "slut" and "whore". When the defense attorneys refused to cross-examine her, the protesters heckled them as well.

The jury deliberated for 10 days before rendering its verdict on August 18. Each of the three youths was acquitted of attempted murder, but convicted of assault and rape of the female jogger, and convicted of assault and robbery of John Loughlin, a male jogger who was badly beaten that night in Central Park.

At the sentencing hearing, Salaam read aloud a poem in which he said, "I look upon this legal lynching as a test by my God Allah." Salaam added, "I and many others know I told the truth. I would never disrespect my own religion by lying," and he told Judge Galligan to "[g]ive me the max," as "[s]ooner or later the truth will come out." McCray told the judge: "I'm not going to let this stop me. I'm going to make it." Santana said, "Everyone knows I'm innocent of the crime. I never did it."

Salaam and McCray were 15 years old, and Santana 14 years old, at the time of the crime. Judge Thomas B. Galligan sentenced each of the defendants to the maximum allowed for juveniles, 5–10 years each in a youth correctional facility.

==== Second trial ====
The second trial, of Kevin Richardson and Korey Wise, began October 22, 1990 and also lasted about two months, ending in December. Kevin Richardson, 14 years old at the time of the crime, had been free on $25,000 bail before the trial.

Assistant District Attorney Elizabeth Lederer had a lengthy opening statement, and Wise broke down at the defense table after it, weeping and shouting that she had lied. He was removed temporarily from the courtroom. Richardson's defense counsel made a motion for a mistrial, because of the potential effect on the jury, but the judge rejected it. The trial proceeded.

The defense attorneys noted that each youth had limited intellectual ability and said that neither was capable of preparing the written statements or videotaped confessions submitted by the prosecution as evidence. They contended that the confessions had been coerced from youths vulnerable to pressure because of their age and their intellectual capacity.

Meili testified again at this trial; again, her name was not given in court. This time one of the defense counsels, Wise's lawyer, cross-examined her. She later said in an interview on Oprah: "I'll tell you what—I didn't feel wonderful about the boys' defense attorneys, especially the one who cross-examined me. He was right in front of my face and, in essence, calling me a slut by asking questions like 'When's the last time you had sex with your boyfriend?'" Wise's lawyer had also asked her whether she had ever been assaulted by men in her life, suggested that a man she knew may have attacked her, and implied that her injuries were not as severe as had been presented.

Richardson was the only one of the five defendants to be convicted of attempted murder of Meili, in addition to sodomy and assault of her, and robbery and riot in the attack on John Loughlin, another jogger in the park. He was sentenced to 5–10 years in a juvenile facility.

Korey Wise, 16 years old at the time of the crime, was acquitted of rape and attempted murder. At trial, Melody Jackson—the sister of one of Wise's friends—testified that, while incarcerated in the Rikers Island complex, he had told her that he had restrained and fondled the jogger. Wise was convicted of lesser charges of sexual abuse, assault, and riot in the attack on the female jogger and on Loughlin. Because of his age and the violent nature of the felony charge, he was tried and sentenced as an adult, receiving 5–15 years in adult prison. After the verdict, Wise shouted at the prosecutor: "You're going to pay for this. Jesus is going to get you. You made this up."

Jurors who agreed to interviews after the trials said that they were not convinced by the youths' confessions, but were impressed by the physical evidence introduced by the prosecutors: semen, grass, dirt, and two hairs described as "consistent with" the victim's hair that were recovered from Richardson's underpants.

According to an FBI expert who gave evidence at the trial, all five defendants could be excluded as being the man who had left the semen samples inside Meili and on a sock. In total, 14 men were tested, including the defendants and Meili's former boyfriend, and all were excluded. The semen belonged to another, unidentified male. Years later, more advanced DNA testing also revealed that the hairs in Richardson's clothes did not match the victim.

==== Criticism of the jury verdicts ====
In a 2016 Guardian article, defense counsel William Warren was reported saying that he thought Trump's ads in 1989 had played a role in securing conviction by the juries, saying that "he poisoned the minds of many people who lived in New York City and who, rightfully, had a natural affinity for the victim." He noted, "Notwithstanding the jurors' assertions that they could be fair and impartial, some of them or their families, who naturally have influence, had to be affected by the inflammatory rhetoric in the ads." In 2019, Time magazine also assessed Trump's ads in 1989 as having adversely affected the case for the defendants.

=== Lopez's plea deal ===
Like the five others, Lopez was indicted for charges related to the attacks on both Meili and Loughlin. He denied any knowledge of the rape in his videotaped confession, but was implicated by other defendants' statements.

Although Assistant District Attorney Elizabeth Lederer had said she would not accept a plea deal for any of the defendants indicted in the rape case, she did come to agreement with Steven Lopez and his attorney in the court on January 30, 1991, prior to a new jury being selected for his trial. He was considered the final of the six defendants in the jogger trial. Because Lopez had not acknowledged participating at all in the rape in his statement to police, and prosecution witnesses had withdrawn from testifying, based on what they said was fear of self-incrimination or "fear [for] their own safety", according to Lederer, the prosecution's case was extremely weak. He was sentenced in March 1991 to 1 1/2 to 4 1/2 years, after pleading guilty to the mugging of jogger John Loughlin. Because Lopez was younger than 16 at the time of the crime, he was sentenced to serve his time in a juvenile facility.

=== Appeals ===
Four of the six—all but Santana and Lopez—appealed their convictions, varyingly challenging Judge Galligan's decision to admit their confessions and whether their confessions were sufficiently corroborated by other evidence. Their convictions were upheld.

== Incarceration ==
Through their time of incarceration, McCray, Richardson, Salaam, Santana, and Wise maintained their innocence in the rape and attack of Meili, including at hearings before parole boards. While they acknowledged "witnessing or participating in other wrongdoing" in the park, they each maintained innocence in the attack of Meili.

Richardson, Salaam, and Santana attended classes and earned a GED and also completed an associate degree while there.

Wise had to serve all of his time in adult prison, and encountered so much personal violence that he asked to stay in isolation for extended periods. He was held at four different prisons, having asked for transfers in the hope of improving his situation. He was released in August 2002, the last of the five men to leave prison.

Santana was released in 1995; McCray in 1996; and Salaam and Richardson in 1997. Wise was released in August 2002.

== Discovery of assailant ==
In 2001, Matias Reyes met Wise when they were held at the Auburn Correctional Facility in upstate New York. Reyes subsequently informed a corrections officer that he had raped Meili. In 2002, Reyes told officials that on the night of April 19, 1989, he had assaulted and raped the female jogger. He was 17 years old at the time of the assault and said that he had committed it alone. He also said that he had intended to burglarize the victim's apartment. Reyes was then working at an East Harlem convenience store on Third Avenue and 102nd Street, and living in a van on the street.

Reyes was believed to have raped another woman in the same area of the park during the day on April 17, two days before the attack on Meili. The detective in the NYPD Sex Crimes Bureau assigned to the case followed a lead to the name Matias Reyes, but she was suddenly reassigned to the child abuse team – a common occurrence during the understaffed period in the crime-ravaged city, with the shortage made worse by the deployment of so many detectives solely to the Meili assault at that same time. As the innocent Central Park Five had already been charged, the NYPD did not do further comparisons of DNA in their database against the Meili assault, though Reyes' DNA was used, a few months later, to confirm his involvement in what was the still unsolved April 17 assault. As the large contingent of NYPD detectives assigned to the high-visibility Central Park jogger case had already exercised abject tunnel vision in their focus on the five youths, Reyes had been left to continue his spree during the summer of 1989, raping four women, killing one of them while her three children were confined nearby, until he was caught by neighbors of a fifth rape victim who escaped while he prepared to inflict further harm. In November 1991, he was sentenced to 33 1/2 years to life after he pleaded guilty to the top counts in each case. He was not charged for the April 17 assault as the victim had left the area and the NYPD were not able to find her again, nor was he charged at that time for the April 19 assault against Meili, as the NYPD had already coerced the false confessions for that crime. Decades later, the now retired detective pulled from the April 17 1989 case by her superiors still feels like she is somehow responsible for Reyes committing the subsequent rapes and murder in the summer, while the assistant district attorney involved in the case believes that – while the science of DNA testing and comparisons at the time would take longer than the two days between the two Central Park assaults – a proper use of the nascent NYPD DNA database could have produced results in time to prevent the convictions of the Central Park Five and possibly the summer 1989 Reyes crimes.

District Attorney Robert Morgenthau's office was notified of the Reyes confession in 2002. Morgenthau appointed a team led by Assistant District Attorneys Nancy Ryan and Peter Casolaro to investigate the case, based on Reyes's confession and a review of evidence. Reyes provided officials with a detailed account of the attack, details of which were corroborated by other evidence which the police held. In addition, his DNA matched the DNA evidence at the scene, confirming that he was the sole source of the semen found in and on the victim "to a factor of one in 6,000,000,000 people". Reyes' DNA matched the semen found on Meili, and he provided other confirmatory evidence. In announcing these facts, Morgenthau also said that the perpetrator had tied up Meili with her T-shirt in a distinctive fashion that Reyes used again on later victims in crimes for which he was convicted.

Based on interviews and other evidence, the team believed that Reyes had acted alone: The rape appeared to have taken place in the North Woods area after the main body of the thirty teenagers had moved well to the south, and the timeline reconstruction of events made it unlikely that he was joined by any of the defendants. In addition, Reyes was not known to have been associated with any of the six indicted defendants. He lived at 102nd Street, in what locals considered another neighborhood. None of the six defendants in the rape mentioned him by name in association with the rape.

Because Reyes's confession occurred after New York's then-five-year statute of limitations had passed, he was not charged with the offense. Reyes claimed he came forward because "it was the right thing to do". As of November 2025, 34 years after his conviction, Reyes is still in prison, with his next parole hearing scheduled for August 2026.

== Convictions of the Five and Lopez vacated ==
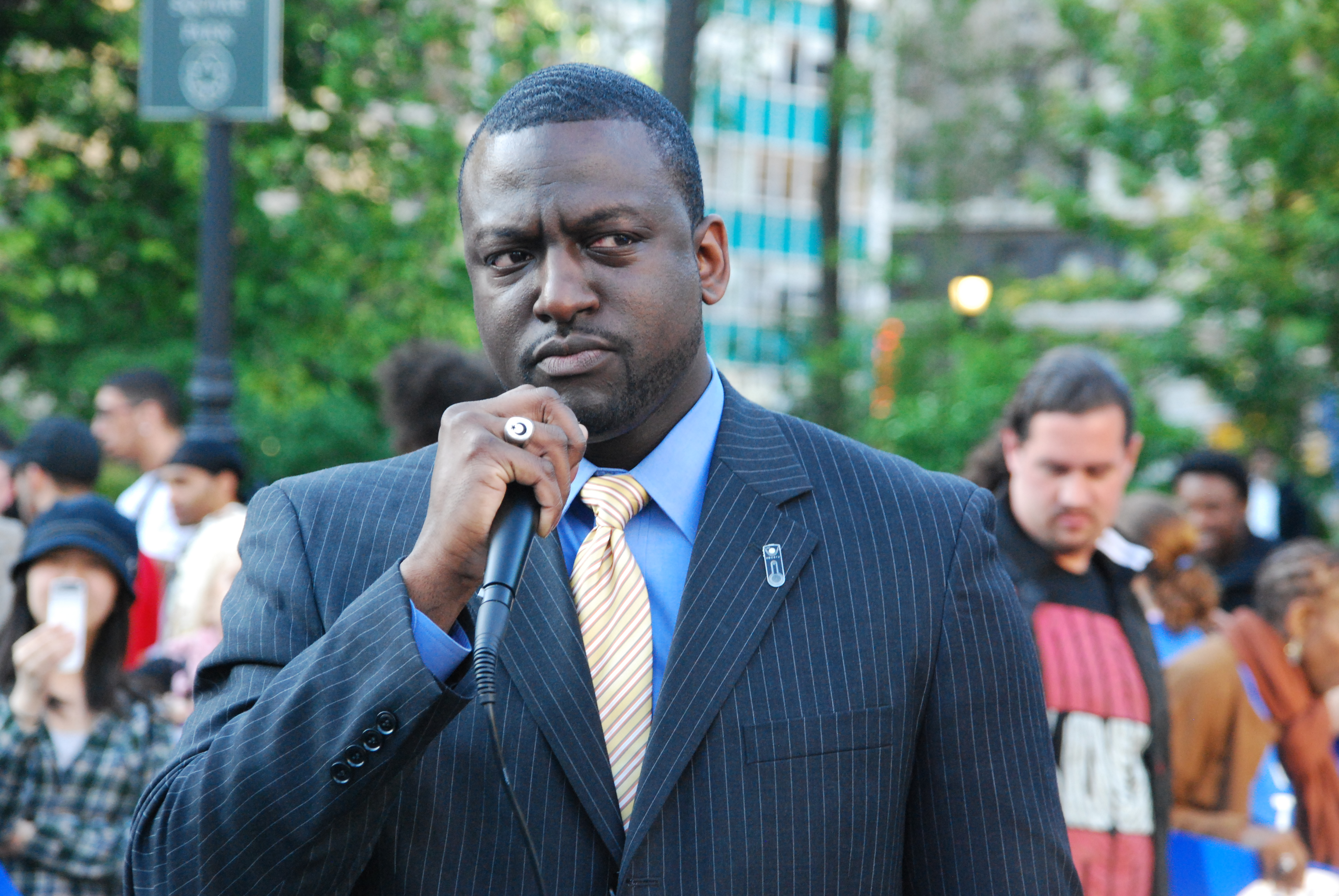
Yusef Salaam in 2009, seven years after his conviction was vacated

Based on newly discovered evidence—specifically, an affidavit by Reyes confessing to the crime and declaring that he acted alone—Wise, McCray, Santana, Richardson, and Salaam filed motions to have their convictions set aside and for the court "to grant whatever further relief may be just and proper." In late 2002, Robert Morgenthau, District Attorney for New York County, conducted an investigation into the potential innocence of Wise, McCray, Santana, Richardson, and Salaam. Nancy Ryan, an ADA in Morgenthau's office, filed an affirmation supporting motions by the defendants to vacate their convictions in December 2002. Ryan's affirmation recommended vacating the convictions of Wise, McCray, Santana, Richardson, and Salaam. Though the "newly discovered evidence" only related to Meili's assault, Ryan found that the defendants' contemporaneous (Note: Although Richardson and Santana had, in 2002, "candidly acknowledged involvement in criminal incidents that occurred on April 19," those admissions could not be considered in the newly-discovered-evidence analysis, which, Ryan said, was constrained to "solely ... the proof introduced at the earlier trials.") confessions as to the other crimes could not reliably be disentangled from their false rape confessions, and, as such, she recommended granting the defendants' motions as to each of the convictions.

As to Meili's assault, the DA's office questioned the veracity of the confessions, pointing to the many inconsistencies between them and their lack of correspondence to established facts.

[A] comparison of the statements reveals troubling discrepancies. ... The accounts given by the five defendants differed from one another on the specific details of virtually every major aspect of the crime—who initiated the attack, who knocked the victim down, who undressed her, who struck her, who held her, who raped her, what weapons were used in the course of the assault, and when in the sequence of events the attack took place. ... In many other respects the defendants' statements were not corroborated by, consistent with, or explanatory of objective, independent evidence. And some of what they said was simply contrary to established fact.

In addition, the filing noted that, based on a reconstruction of events, the teenagers were either spectating or participating in other crimes in the park at the time that the rape occurred. Ryan continued: "Ultimately, there proved to be no physical or forensic evidence recovered at the scene or from the person or effects of the victim which connected the defendants to the attack on the jogger, or could establish how many perpetrators participated."

The five defendants' convictions were vacated by New York Supreme Court Justice Charles J. Tejada on December 19, 2002. As Morgenthau recommended, Tejada's order vacated the convictions for all the crimes of which the defendants had been convicted. All five of the defendants had completed their prison sentences at the time of Tejada's order; their names were cleared in relation to this case. This also enabled them being removed from New York State's sex offender registry. In addition to having had difficulty getting employment or renting housing, as registered offenders, they had been required to report to authorities in person every three months. The city government also withdrew all charges against the men.

On July 25, 2022, Steven Lopez's robbery conviction was overturned, and the indictment against him dismissed after District Attorney Alvin Bragg filed a motion to vacate. According to Bragg, "Mr. Lopez was charged and pleaded guilty in the face of false statements, unreliable forensic analysis and immense external pressure."

== Aftermath ==
The DA's recommendation to vacate the convictions was strongly opposed by lead detectives on the case and other members of the police department. Police Commissioner Raymond Kelly complained at the time that Morgenthau's staff had denied his detectives access to "important evidence" needed to conduct a thorough investigation.

Linda Fairstein, who directed the original prosecution, agreed with the decision to vacate the rape charges but said the separate assault charges should have remained. Morgenthau would later express regret assigning the case to Fairstein, saying "I had complete confidence in Linda Fairstein. Turned out to be misplaced. But we rectified it."

=== Armstrong Report ===
Following these events, in 2002, New York City Police Commissioner Raymond Kelly commissioned a panel to review the case, "To determine whether the new evidence [from the Reyes affidavit and related evidence, and Morgenthau's investigation] indicated that police supervisors or officers acted improperly or incorrectly, and to determine whether police policy or procedures needed to be changed as a result of the Central Park jogger case." The panel was chaired by attorney Michael F. Armstrong, the former chief counsel to the Knapp Commission, which in 1972 had documented widespread corruption in the NYPD. Two other attorneys were included: Jules Martin, a former police officer and now New York University Vice President; and Stephen Hammerman, deputy police commissioner for legal affairs. The panel issued a 43-page report in January 2003.

In its January 2003 Armstrong Report, the panel "did not dispute the legal necessity of setting aside the convictions of the five defendants based on the new DNA evidence that Mr. Reyes had raped the jogger." But it disputed acceptance of Reyes's claim that he alone had raped the jogger. It said there was "nothing but his uncorroborated word" that he acted alone. Armstrong said the panel believed "the word of a serial rapist killer is not something to be heavily relied upon."

The report concluded that the five men whose convictions had been vacated had "most likely" participated in the beating and rape of the jogger and that the "most likely scenario" was that "both the defendants and Reyes assaulted her, perhaps successively." The report said Reyes had most likely "either joined in the attack as it was ending or waited until the defendants had moved on to their next victims before descending upon her himself, raping her and inflicting upon her the brutal injuries that almost caused her death."

New York City detectives supported the 2003 Armstrong Report by the police department. The panel said there had been "no misconduct in the 1989 investigation of the Central Park jogger case".

As to the five defendants, the report said:

We believe the inconsistencies contained in the various statements were not such as to destroy their reliability. On the other hand, there was a general consistency that ran through the defendants' descriptions of the attack on the female jogger: she was knocked down on the road, dragged into the woods, hit and molested by several defendants, sexually abused by some while others held her arms and legs, and left semiconscious in a state of undress.

Edward Conlon, a writer and former New York police officer, said that Armstrong, "[i]n support of his assessment, ... offers a number of tantalizing theories, only partially undergirded by fully explored evidence". He characterized the report as "resembl[ing] a defense document more than a prosecution brief in its approach, throwing everything against the wall to see what sticks".

=== Lawsuits against New York City ===
In 2003, McCray, Richardson, Santana, Salaam, and Wise sued the City of New York in federal court, accusing the city's police and prosecutors of false arrest, malicious prosecution and a racially motivated conspiracy to deprive the men of their civil rights. The defendants sought $52 million.

Under Michael Bloomberg's mayoral administration, the city refused to pursue a settlement for the lawsuits based on a conclusion that the defendants had had a fair trial. Speaking at a news conference in 2002, Bloomberg spoke of his confidence regarding the actions of the police department. "As far as I can tell, the N.Y.P.D. did exactly what they should have done a number of years ago when the terrible incident took place ... If we see any reason to think that we acted inappropriately, [Police] Commissioner Kelly will certainly take appropriate measures. But so far we believe that the N.Y.P.D. did act appropriately."

In 2011, Celeste Koeleveld, then New York City's Executive Assistant Corporation Counsel for Public Safety, gave a public statement on behalf of the city after receiving public criticism from Councilman Charles Barron for failing to resolve the lawsuits:

The charges against the plaintiffs and other youths were based on abundant probable cause, including confessions that withstood intense scrutiny, in full and fair pretrial hearings and at two lengthy public trials ... Nothing unearthed since the trials, including Matias Reyes's connection to the attack on the jogger, changes that fact.

After the election of Mayor Bill de Blasio, who had run on a campaign promise to resolve the matter, the city endeavored to settle the suit; in a June 2014 press conference, de Blasio announced a proposed settlement payment of about $40 million—nearly $1 million per year of incarceration for each defendant.

An injustice was done and we have a moral obligation to respond to that injustice ... I think that the way we've proceeded was [with] an understanding that that had to be rectified, in a way that made sense and a way that was mindful and careful, but I think we're on the right track ... And I think the moral issue is quite clear and obviously was made clear by the court decisions in recent years.

The settlement was officially approved in September 2014. Santana, Salaam, McCray, and Richardson each received around $7.1 million from the city for their years in prison, while Wise received $12.2 million because he had served six additional years. The city did not admit to any wrongdoing in the settlement.

The five defendants subsequently sued the state in the New York Court of Claims, before Judge Alan Marin. The New York courts allowed the second suit because, unlike the first suit, which was predicated on civil-rights violations, the second suit was based on claims for economic and emotional devastation caused by incarceration. Speaking of the second suit, against the state, Santana said: "When you have a person who has been exonerated of a crime, the city provides no services to transition him back to society. The only thing left is something like this—so you can receive some type of money so you can survive."

In 2016, the state-court suit settled for $3.9 million, with varying amounts related to the period of time that each man had served in prison.

==== Reaction to settlements ====
After New York City had settled the federal suit, some figures returned to the media to dispute the court's 2002 decision to vacate the convictions. Retired New York City detective Edward Conlon, who had been involved with the case, in an article published in October 2014 in The Daily Beast, quoted incriminatory statements allegedly made by some of the youths after they had been taken into custody by police in April 1989.

Similarly, two doctors who had treated Meili after the attack said in 2014, after the settlement, that some of her injuries appeared to be inconsistent with Reyes's claim that he had acted alone. But a forensic pathologist who testified at the 1990 trial said that it was impossible to tell from the victim's injuries how many people had participated in the assault, as did New York City's chief medical examiner in 2002. Meili, who had no memory of what happened, said at the time of the settlement that she believed there had been more than one attacker and expressed her regret that the case had been settled.

Donald Trump also commented on the settlement in a 2014 opinion article for the New York Daily News. He said the settlement was "a disgrace", and that the men were likely guilty: "Settling doesn't mean innocence. ... Speak to the detectives on the case and try listening to the facts. These young men do not exactly have the pasts of angels." During his 2016 presidential campaign, Trump again said that the Exonerated Five were guilty and that their convictions should not have been vacated. The Exonerated Five criticized Trump at the time for his statement, stating they had falsely confessed under police coercion. Other critics included U.S. Senator John McCain, who said that Trump's responses were "outrageous statements about the innocent men in the case". He cited this as among his reasons to retract his endorsement of the candidate. In June 2019 Trump stated he would not apologize, saying the Exonerated Five "admitted their guilt".

Meili later commented that she wished the matter would have been retried, rather than settled out of court, and that she believed her attack was not the result of a single person.

=== Trisha Meili ===
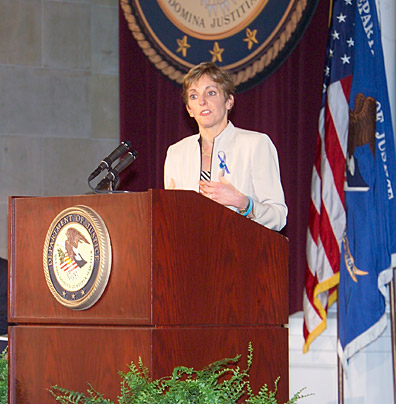
Trisha Meili in 2005

The initial medical prognosis was that Meili would die of her injuries or remain in a permanent coma. She was given last rites. Meili came out of her coma after 12 days on May 1st, unable to talk, read, or walk. She was then treated for seven weeks in Metropolitan Hospital in East Harlem before being transferred to Gaylord Hospital, a long-term acute care center in Wallingford, Connecticut, where she spent six months in rehabilitation. She did not walk until mid-July 1989. She returned to work eight months after the attack. She largely recovered, with some lingering disabilities related to balance and loss of vision. As a result of the severe trauma, she had no memory of the attack or any events up to an hour before the assault, nor of the six weeks following the attack.

Meili returned to work at the investment banking firm Salomon Brothers where she was a vice president. In April 2003, Meili confirmed her identity to the media when she published a memoir entitled I Am the Central Park Jogger: A Story of Hope and Possibility. She began a career as an inspirational speaker. She also works with victims of sexual assault and brain injury in the Mount Sinai Hospital sexual assault and violence intervention program. She had resumed jogging in 1989, three or four months after the attack, and over the years added a variety of other exercise and yoga practice. She continues to manifest some after-effects of the assault, including memory loss.

=== Lives of the Exonerated Five ===
After being released from prison in September 1996, McCray moved to Maryland and became a forklift operator. He is married, has six children, and lives and works in Georgia.

Richardson acted as an advocate with Santana and Salaam to reform New York State's criminal justice practices, advocating methods to prevent false confessions and eyewitness misidentifications. He also participated in a series of talks on criminal-justice reform and wrongful convictions.

Salaam became a board member of the Innocence Project and has advocated for criminal-justice reform, particularly for juveniles. In 2016, he received a Lifetime Achievement Award from President Barack Obama. In 2017, he and Fernando Bermudez penned an op ed for the New York Daily News in support of two criminal-justice-reform measures offered by then-Governor Andrew Cuomo: one proposal would require police interrogations to be recorded from start to finish; the second would provide training to police officers to protect against misidentification. The budget proposal passed, and the video-recording requirement took effect April 1, 2018. Salaam started Yusef Speaks LLC and works as a motivational speaker. Salaam declared his candidacy for the open New York City Council's 9th District in 2023, after incumbent Kristin Richardson Jordan declined to run for reelection. Salaam won the Democratic nomination for the seat on June 27, 2023, and officially won the seat on November 7, 2023.

Santana was released from prison in December 1995, and was out of prison for six months before he was found guilty of possession of crack cocaine in 1998 and reincarcerated for a term of 3.5 to 7 years. He was released in 2002 when the prosecutor, agreeing that his sentence had been higher due to his (then-vacated) conviction for raping Meili, reduced it to the 18–48 months that would typically have been given to a first-time offender. Santana started a clothing company, Park Madison NYC, and donates a portion of Park Madison NYC's proceeds to the Innocence Project. Santana has also appeared with other involved men in presentations at local schools and colleges.

After his release, Wise changed his first name to Korey; he found work as a construction worker and, for a time, as an office cleaner for Reverend Al Sharpton. Wise remained in New York City, where he works as a speaker and justice reform activist. He donated $190,000 of his 2014 settlement to the chapter of the Innocence Project at the University of Colorado Law School, to aid other wrongfully convicted people to gain exoneration; they renamed the project in his honor as the Korey Wise Innocence Project.

The Five made the news in late March and early April 2023, after Trump was indicted on felony charges of falsifying business records in an alleged hush money payment scheme and cover-up before the 2016 presidential election. Salaam issued a one-word statement: "Karma". He reminded the world that Trump never apologized for the misdirected vengeance and ran a full-page ad in the New York Times with the headline text, "Bring back justice & fairness. Build a brighter future for Harlem!" Raymond Santana, on social media, urged for people to "never forget" Trump's actions. Rev. Al Sharpton noted the irony of both trials taking place in the same downtown Manhattan courthouse building: "what goes around comes around."

During a presidential debate on September 10, 2024, Trump falsely said the Five had initially pleaded guilty to the assault before changing their pleas (actually some of them had confessed but recanted before entering any official plea); Trump also described during the debate his viewpoint at the time of those events: "I said, 'well, if they pled guilty they badly hurt a person, killed a person ultimately….'" Doctors predicted the victim might ultimately die of her injuries, but she survived. On October 21, the Five sued Trump for defamation in federal court in Philadelphia, where he had made the allegedly defamatory statements.

=== Legislative and other justice reforms ===
Because of the great publicity surrounding the case, the vacated conviction of Antron McCray, Kevin Richardson, Yusef Salaam, Raymond Santana, and Korey Wise highlighted the issue of false confessions. The issue of false confessions has become a major topic of study and efforts at criminal justice reform, particularly for juveniles. Juveniles have been found to make false confessions and guilty pleas at a much higher rate than adults.

Advances in DNA analysis and the work of non-profit groups such as the Innocence Project have resulted in 343 people being exonerated of their crimes as of July 31, 2016 due to DNA testing. This process has revealed the strong role of false confessions in wrongful convictions. According to a 2016 study by Craig J. Trocino, director of the Miami Law Innocence Clinic, 27 percent of those persons had "originally confessed to their crimes".

Members of the Five have been among activists who have advocated for videotaped interrogations and related reforms to try to prevent false confessions. Since 1989, New York and some 24 other states have passed laws requiring "electronic records of full interrogations". In some cases, this requirement is limited to certain types of crimes.

== Contemporaneous cases compared by the media ==
The Central Park events, which were attributed at the time to members of the large group of youths who attacked numerous persons in the park, including white, Black and Hispanic, were covered as an extreme example of the violence that was occurring in the city, including assaults and robberies, rapes and homicides. Focusing on rapes in the same week as the one in Central Park, The New York Times reported on April 29, 1990, on the "28 other first-degree rapes or attempted rapes reported across New York City". The fourth one, on April 17, took place during the day in the park and is now tied to Reyes.

Later after the Central Park rape, when public attention was on the theory of a gang of young suspects, a brutal attack took place in Brooklyn on May 3, 1989. A 39-year-old black woman was robbed, raped and thrown from the roof of a four-story building by three young men. She fell 50 feet, suffering severe injuries. The incident received little media coverage in May 1989, when the focus was on the Central Park case. The woman's injuries required extensive hospitalization and rehabilitation.

The New York Times continued to report on the case, and followed up on prosecution of suspects. Tyrone Prescott, 17, Kelvin Furman, 22, and another young man, Darren Decotea (name corrected a few days later as Darron Decoteau), 17, were apprehended within two weeks and prosecuted for the crimes. They arranged plea deals with the prosecution in October 1990 before trial; the first two were sentenced to six to 18 years in prison. Decoteau had made a plea deal in February in which he agreed to testify against the other two. He was sentenced on October 10, 1990, to four to twelve years in prison. Social justice activists and critics have pointed to the lack of extensive coverage of the attack of the woman in Brooklyn as showing the media's racial bias; they have accused it of overlooking violence against minority women.

== Representation in other media ==
- Ken Burns, Sarah Burns and her husband David McMahon premiered their The Central Park Five, a documentary film about the case, at the Cannes Film Festival in May 2012. Documentarian Ken Burns said he hoped the material of the film would push the city to settle the men's case against it. On September 12, 2012, attorneys for New York City subpoenaed the production company for access to the original footage in connection with its defense of the 2003 federal civil lawsuit brought against the city by three of the convicted youths. Celeste Koeleveld, the city's executive assistant corporation counsel for public safety, justified the subpoena on the grounds that the film had "crossed the line from journalism to advocacy" for the wrongfully convicted men. In February 2013, U.S. Judge Ronald L. Ellis quashed the city's subpoena.
- On May 31, 2019, When They See Us, a four-episode miniseries, was released on Netflix. Ava DuVernay co-wrote and directed the drama. Its release and wide viewing on Netflix prompted renewed discussion of the case, the criminal justice system, and of the lives of the five men. It has resulted in a civil libel lawsuit by Fairstein.
- An opera, also called The Central Park Five, premiered in Long Beach, California, performed by the Long Beach Opera Company, on June 15, 2019. The music is by composer Anthony Davis and the libretto by Richard Wesley. Davis won the 2020 Pulitzer Prize for Music for this work. An earlier version, Five, had premiered in Newark, New Jersey, by the Trilogy Company.

== See also ==
- 1995 Okinawa rape incident
- Groveland Four
- List of wrongful convictions in the United States
- Martinsville Seven
- Scottsboro Boys
- Willie McGee (convict)
