= Senator Benjamin (disambiguation) =

Judah P. Benjamin (1811–1884) was a U.S. Senator from Louisiana from 1853 to 1861. Senator Benjamin may also refer to:

- Adam Benjamin Jr. (1935–1982), Indiana State Senate
- Brian Benjamin (born 1976), New York State Senate
