= Herman D. Farrell Jr. =

American politician (1932–2018)

Chair of the New York Democratic Party
- In office December 2001 – December 31, 2006
- Preceded by: Judith H. Hope
- Succeeded by: June O'Neill/David Pollak

Member of the New York State Assembly from the 71st district
- In office January 1, 1983 – September 5, 2017
- Preceded by: Geraldine L. Daniels
- Succeeded by: Al Taylor

Member of the New York State Assembly from the 74th district
- In office January 1, 1975 – December 31, 1982
- Preceded by: Mark T. Southall
- Succeeded by: Louis Niñé

Personal details
- Born: February 4, 1932 New York City, New York, U.S.
- Died: May 26, 2018 (aged 86) New York City, New York, U.S.
- Party: Democratic
- Children: 3

Herman Daniel “Denny” Farrell Jr. (February 4, 1932 – May 26, 2018) was an American politician from New York. He was a Democratic member of the New York State Assembly representing the Manhattan neighborhoods of West Harlem, Inwood and Washington Heights from 1975 to 2017.

== Early life ==
Farrell was born February 4, 1932, in Manhattan. His parents, Herman Sr. and Amy Gladys, owned a dress shop. He graduated from George Washington High School in Washington Heights. Before working in politics, he was an auto mechanic.

He worked for Mayor John Lindsay, then, in 1966, began work as a confidential aide to a state Supreme Court justice.

== Political career ==
In 1970, he was elected a Democratic state committeeman. First elected to the New York Assembly in 1974, Farrell was a longtime Chairman of the powerful Assembly Ways and Means Committee, as well as a member of the Assembly Rules Committee and the Black, Puerto Rican, Hispanic and Asian Legislative Caucus. He previously served as Chairman of the Assembly Committee on Banks from 1979 to 1994. He was at one point a member of the Democratic Socialists of America, but later broke from the organization.

Farrell played a pivotal role in the passage of several significant pieces of legislation, including the Omnibus Consumer Protection and Banking Legislation Act, which established a toll-free number at the New York State Banking Department that dispenses information about credit card interest rates, fees and grace periods, and a mandate for banks to furnish low-cost checking accounts to its customers. He also played an important role in the passage of the Neighborhood Preservation Companies Act, whereby New York State funds community organizations that "provide tenant advocacy."

However, Farrell is most widely known for having been a prominent member of the state (and to a lesser extent, national) Democratic Party. He was first elected as a Democratic State Committeeman in 1970, serving a two-year term. Subsequently, he was elected as the leader of the New York County Democratic Party (1981–2009) and Vice-Chair of the New York State Democratic Party, in which capacity he served for a decade. He was Chairman of the New York State Democratic Committee from 2001 to 2006. He also served as a member of the Democratic National Committee. Farrell resigned from the State Assembly in September 2017.

=== Campaign for Mayor ===
Farrell entered the Democratic primary against Ed Koch in the 1985 election for mayor. Although Farrell's entry into the race initially created some bad blood, David Dinkins credited him for paving the way for Dinkins’ victory in 1989.

Farrell's late entry into the race was a surprise to the party and caused a split between party leaders in Manhattan and the outer boroughs and between black and Latino politicians. At the time, Bronx Borough President Herman Badillo believed he would win the endorsement of the Coalition for a Just New York, one of the city's black political organizations, to form a coalition that could unseat Koch.

He recovered from an attempt by Council President Carol Bellamy to remove him from the ballot but still fared poorly taking 13% of the vote and finishing third behind Bellamy and Koch.

Following the split, black leaders from around New York City met to settle past differences and focus on uniting for future elections. David Dinkins’ strength with black voters helped him defeat Koch in 1989 to become mayor.

== Later life ==
A pedestrian bridge constructed in Riverside Park in late 2017 was named after Farrell as it was located within his Assembly district. Riverbank State Park was renamed in honor of Farrell in September 2017.

Farrell died of heart failure on May 26, 2018, at the age of 86.

New York State Assembly
Preceded by Mark T. Southall	Member of the New York State Assembly from the 74th district 1975–1982	Succeeded by Louis Niñé
Preceded by Geraldine L. Daniels	Member of the New York State Assembly from the 71st district 1983–2017	Succeeded by Al Taylor
Party political offices
Preceded by Judith H. Hope	Chairman of the New York State Democratic Committee; 2001–2006	Succeeded by June O'Neill/David Pollak
