= Cordell Cleare =

American politician (born 1965)

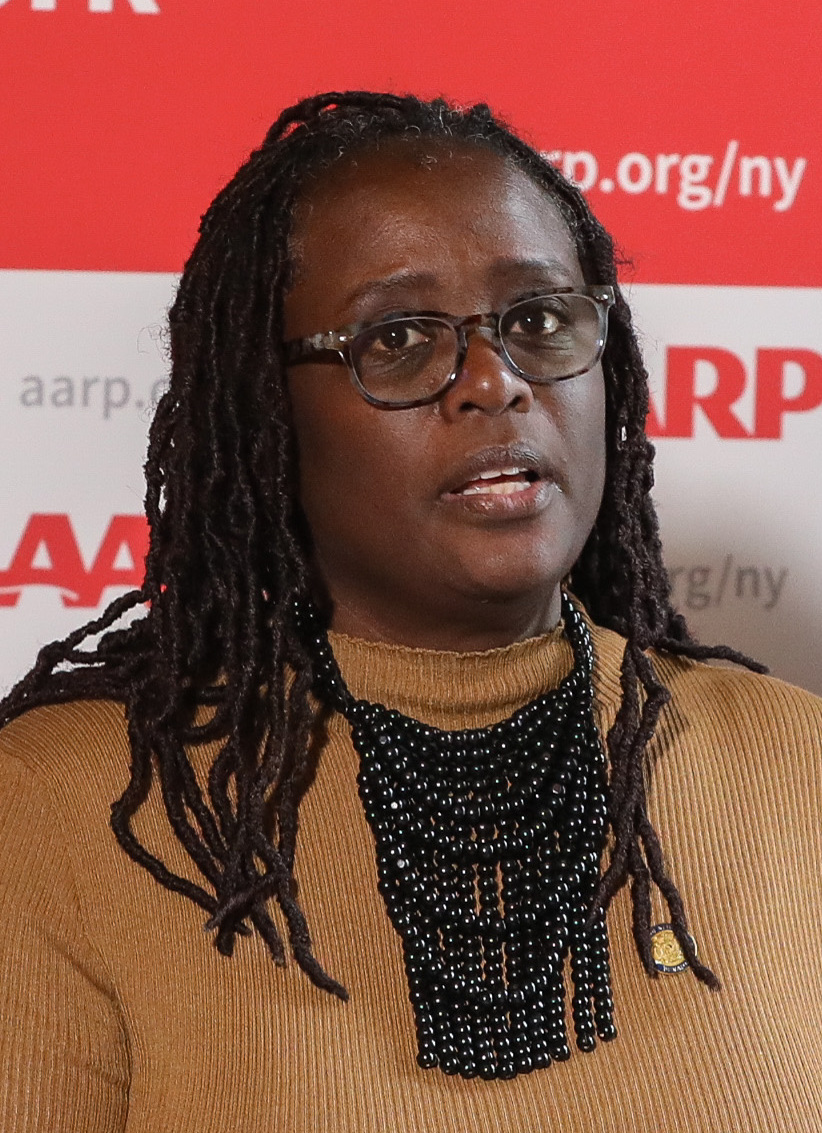
- Cleare in 2024

Member of the New York State Senate from the 30th district
- Incumbent
- Assumed office November 30, 2021
- Preceded by: Brian Benjamin

Personal details
- Born: December 5, 1965 (age 60)
- Party: Democratic
- Education: Empire State University
- Website: Campaign website

Cordell Cleare (born December 5, 1965) is an American activist and politician from Harlem, New York City. A member of the Democratic Party, she has been politically active in Harlem since the late 1990s. She is currently the state senator for New York's 30th State Senate district.

== Early life ==
Cordell Cleare was raised in Harlem, where her family lived for four generations.

== Career ==
Cleare worked for over 18 years for New York State Senator Bill Perkins and served as his chief of staff for several years. Cleare has served on the District #3 Community Education Council, and was a Community School Board member for six years. In 2008, Cleare campaigned for then-Senator Barack Obama's presidential run. In 2012, she supported Obama's run for re-election, and was a delegate to the Democratic National Convention.

Cleare ran for New York City Council to represent District 9 in 2017, losing to her old boss Perkins. She ran again for that seat in 2021, with both her and Perkins losing to Kristin Richardson Jordan.

On September 25, 2021, Cleare was selected by the Manhattan Democratic Committee to be the Democratic nominee in a special election for New York's 30th State Senate district. The district became vacant when incumbent Brian Benjamin was appointed Lieutenant Governor. However, it is so heavily Democratic that Cleare was effectively chosen as its next state senator. The special election occurred on November 2, 2021, and she won with over 88% of the vote. In March 2022, Congress member Carolyn Maloney endorsed State Senator Cleare for reelection.

== Activism ==
Cleare was a tenant organizer and then the chair of the New York City Coalition to End Lead Poisoning. She became involved with the organization after her two-year-old son was diagnosed with lead poisoning, an issue she called “completely preventable.” Cleare raised awareness about lead poisoning through workshops at schools and community centres, health fairs, and government officials. In 1997, Cleare was awarded the New York Public Library’s eleventh annual Brooke Russell Astor Award for her activism work, which included a $10,000 prize.

Cleare's advocacy helped create the Childhood Lead Poisoning Prevention Bill, which passed the New York City Council in 2004.

Cleare was endorsed by the New York League of Conservation Voters during the 2021 New York City Council election.

Cleare's platform for her state senate election included phasing out fossil fuels for the Metropolitan Transit Authority and protecting green spaces.

== Awards ==
- 1997: Brooke Russell Astor Award - Co-chair of the New York City Coalition to End Lead Poisoning

== See also ==
- List of people from Harlem
