= Bill Perkins (politician) =

American politician (1949–2023)

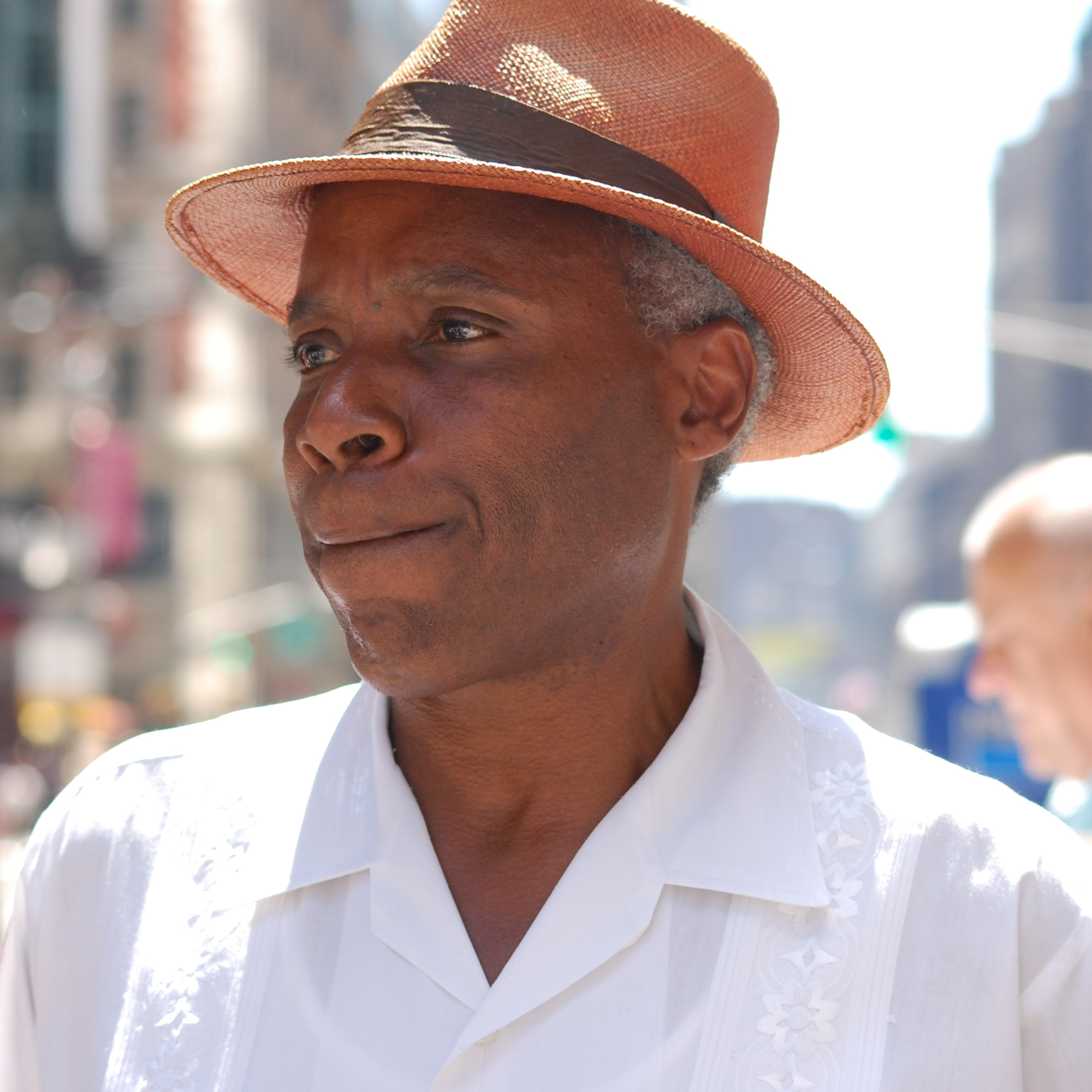
- Perkins speaking in 2008

Member of the New York City Council from the 9th district
- In office March 1, 2017 – December 31, 2021
- Preceded by: Inez Dickens
- Succeeded by: Kristin Richardson Jordan
- In office January 1, 1998 – December 31, 2005
- Preceded by: C. Virginia Fields
- Succeeded by: Inez Dickens

Member of the New York State Senate
- In office January 1, 2007 – February 28, 2017
- Preceded by: David Paterson
- Succeeded by: Brian Benjamin
- Constituency: 29th district (2007-2012); 30th district (2013-2017)

Personal details
- Born: April 18, 1949 Manhattan, New York, U.S.
- Died: May 16, 2023 (aged 74) Manhattan, New York, U.S.
- Party: Democratic
- Education: Brown University

William Morris Perkins (April 18, 1949 – May 16, 2023) was an American politician from the state of New York. A Democrat, he served in the New York City Council from the 9th district from 2017 to 2021. The district includes portions of Harlem in Manhattan. Perkins formerly represented the same seat from 1998 to 2005, and was a member of the New York State Senate for the 30th District from 2007 to 2017.

== Early life and education ==
Perkins was born and raised in Harlem, a neighborhood in Manhattan. He attended Collegiate School on a scholarship before receiving a scholarship to Brown University. He graduated from Brown in 1972.

== Political career ==
=== New York City Council (1998–2005) ===
In 1997, Perkins was first elected to the New York City Council, winning the seat easily after losing the Democratic nomination for the Council three times previously. On the Council, Perkins served as Deputy Majority Leader, and championed the lead paint laws that required New York City residences to be tested for hazardous conditions. He also ran for Manhattan Borough President in 2005, and lost the primary to Scott Stringer.

=== New York State Senate (2007–2017) ===
Term-limited from the Council in 2005, Perkins opted to seek election to the New York State Senate in 2006, where he won. Bill Perkins endorsed United States Senator Barack Obama over U.S. Senator Hillary Clinton during the 2008 Democratic Party presidential primaries.

He was re-elected five times and served for more ten years before resigning to retake his seat on the New York City Council. Perkins also ran briefly to succeed Charles Rangel in the United States House of Representatives in 2016, but later dropped out.

In 2015, Perkins was one of a number of Black activists who met with Venezuelan president Nicolás Maduro in Harlem. He was quoted as saying, “We recognize that in the person of Nicolás Maduro, the president of Venezuela, we have an exceptional leader!”

Perkins was one of the few New York lawmakers who endorsed Bernie Sanders and not Hillary Clinton, in the 2016 Democratic Party presidential primaries.

=== New York City Council (2017–2021) ===
In 2016, Councilmember Inez Dickens, who had succeeded Perkins on the New York City Council, announced that she would forgo her last year on the Council to run for a vacant seat in the New York State Assembly. After Dickens won the Assembly seat, New York City Mayor Bill de Blasio called a February 14, 2017, special election to fill her vacated seat on the City Council. Perkins announced that he would be a candidate and won the election with over 33% of the vote. He was sworn into office on March 1, 2017.

Perkins won a full four-year term in the November 2017 general election.

On January 31, 2019, Perkins was transported to a hospital by authorities "after neighbors called the police on him for acting erratically in his Manhattan home". At the time, the Daily News reported that Perkins was receiving treatment for colon cancer and that various constituents and colleagues had expressed concern about his health and his continued fitness to hold public office. In June 2021, Gothamist published a piece on Perkins entitled "As Worries Persist Over Harlem Lawmaker's Health, Elected Leaders Stay Mum".

Perkins sought re-election to the City Council in 2021. The June 22, 2021, Democratic primary in Council District 9 was so close that a recount was held. On August 9, 2021, Perkins conceded the primary election to Kristin Richardson Jordan, a democratic socialist, and announced that he would retire at the end of the year.

=== Electoral history ===
Election history
| Location | Year | Election | Results |
|---|---|---|---|
| NYC Council District 17 | 2017 | Non-partisan special election | √ Bill Perkins 33.95% Marvin Holland 28.38% Athena Moore 14.81% Larry Scott Blackmon 11.84% Cordell Cleare 9.51% Dawn Simmons 5.15% Charles Cooper 3.05% Todd Stevens 1.59% Caprice Alves 1.49% |
| NYC Council District 17 | 2017 | Democratic Primary | √ Bill Perkins 49.87% Marvin Holland 19.59% Cordell Cleare 17.45% Tyson-Lord Gray 8.33% Marvin Spruill 2.35% Julius Tajiddin 1.94% |
| NYC Council District 17 | 2017 | General | √ Bill Perkins (D) 78.17% Tyson-Lord Gray (Liberal) 12.94% Dianne Mack (Harlem Matters) 4.40% Jack Royster (R) 2.46% Pierre Gooding (Reform) 1.72% |

== Personal life and death ==
Perkins was a marathon runner and a colon cancer survivor.

In January 2022, Perkins briefly went missing from his apartment before being found by police. Police sources stated that he suffered from dementia.

Perkins died in New York City on May 16, 2023, at the age of 74. He was survived by his wife, Pamela Green Perkins.

== See also ==
- 2009 New York State Senate leadership crisis
- List of people from Harlem

Political offices
| Preceded by Inez Dickens | New York City Council, 9th district 2017–2021 | Succeeded by Kristin Richardson Jordan |
| Preceded by C. Virginia Fields | New York City Council, 9th district 1998–2005 | Succeeded by Inez Dickens |
New York State Senate
| Preceded by David Paterson | New York State Senate, 30th District; 2007–2017 | Succeeded by Brian Benjamin |
