= Korey Wise =

American criminal justice activist

- Born: Kharey Wise; July 26, 1972 (age 54)
- Known for: Central Park jogger case

Korey Wise (born Kharey Wise; July 26, 1972) is an American activist who travels across the United States advocating for criminal justice reform. He shares his experience of being wrongfully convicted in the Central Park jogger case (along with Raymond Santana Jr., Kevin Richardson, Antron McCray, and Yusef Salaam) for the attack on Trisha Meili, a 28-year-old white woman jogging in Central Park, as well as attacks on eight other individuals on the night of April 19, 1989. Wise spent approximately 14 years incarcerated, maintaining his innocence from 1989 until he was exonerated in 2002.

== Central Park Five ==
At 16 years old, Wise was the oldest of the "Central Park Five", five teenagers wrongly sentenced in the Central Park jogger case. He was the only one of the five to serve all his time in the adult prison system. He was not a suspect in any of the crimes initially, and freely accompanied his friend to the police station. Once there, however, detectives decided to interrogate him about the rape of Meili, despite his name not originally being on the list of suspects. After prolonged police interrogation, Wise eventually gave a taped confession to the crime, despite not having committed it. Wise was convicted of assault, sexual abuse, and rioting. Wise was exonerated in 2002 after Matias Reyes admitted to the crime and DNA testing proved his guilt. In 2014, Wise and the other four exonerated convicts settled a federal lawsuit against New York City, winning $41 million.

== Activism ==
In 2015, Wise donated $190,000 to the University of Colorado Law School Innocence Project, which was renamed to the Korey Wise Innocence Project. During the COVID-19 pandemic, Wise helped provide sustenance to senior residents in Harlem. Wise, along with Yusef Salaam, spoke at the 2024 Democratic National Convention, endorsing Kamala Harris for United States President and criticizing Donald Trump for calling for his execution.

== Personal life ==
In July 2019, Wise purchased a condominium overlooking Central Park. He was the only one of the five who chose to continue to reside in New York City after his release until Yusef Salaam returned to Harlem to run for a New York City Council seat in 2023. Wise has a learning disability and is hard of hearing.

Korey Wise has two sisters, named Vanity and Marci. Marci was killed while Korey was in prison.
