= New York's 71st State Assembly district =

American legislative district

Assemblymember
Al Taylor; D–Harlem

New York's 71st State Assembly district is one of the 150 districts in the New York State Assembly. It has been represented by Al Taylor since 2017.

== Geography ==
District 71 is located in Manhattan, comprising portions of Hamilton Heights, Harlem, and Washington Heights.

== Recent election results ==
=== 2026 ===
2026 New York State Assembly election, District 71
Primary election
Party	Candidate	Votes	%
Democratic	Al Taylor (incumbent)	9,174	55.6
Democratic	Julien Segura	5,603	33.9
Democratic	Rolando Gomez	1,634	9.9
Write-in		104	0.6
Total votes		16,515	100.0
General election
Democratic	Al Taylor		
Working Families	Al Taylor		
Total	Al Taylor (incumbent)		
Write-in			
Total votes			100.0

=== 2024 ===
2024 New York State Assembly election, District 71
Primary election
Party	Candidate	Votes	%
Democratic	Al Taylor (incumbent)	4,467	70.7
Democratic	Julien Segura	1,793	28.4
Write-in		54	0.9
Total votes		6,314	100
General election
Democratic	Al Taylor (incumbent)	37,267	86.5
Republican	Josiel Andujar	5,621	13.1
Write-in		163	0.4
Total votes		43,051	100.0
Democratic hold			

=== 2022 ===
2022 New York State Assembly election, District 71
Primary election
Party	Candidate	Votes	%
Democratic	Al Taylor (incumbent)	7,185	70.7
Democratic	Luis Tejada	2,931	28.9
Write-in		44	0.4
Total votes		10,160	100.0
General election
Democratic	Al Taylor (incumbent)	26,081	99.2
Write-in		199	0.8
Total votes		26,280	100.0
Democratic hold			

=== 2020 ===
2020 New York State Assembly election, District 71
Primary election
Party	Candidate	Votes	%
Democratic	Al Taylor (incumbent)	13,124	76.9
Democratic	Guillermo Perez	3,833	22.5
Write-in		108	0.6
Total votes		17,065	100.0
General election
Democratic	Al Taylor	40,141	
Working Families	Al Taylor	8,397	
Total	Al Taylor (incumbent)	48,538	99.7
Write-in		141	0.3
Total votes		48,679	100.0
Democratic hold			

=== 2018 ===
2018 New York State Assembly election, District 71
Primary election
Party	Candidate	Votes	%
Democratic	Al Taylor (incumbent)	9,846	47.4
Democratic	Luis Tejada	6,991	33.7
Democratic	Guillermo Perez	3,798	18.3
Write-in		127	0.6
Total votes		20,762	100.0
General election
Democratic	Al Taylor	36,311	
Working Families	Al Taylor	2,587	
Total	Al Taylor (incumbent)	38,898	99.6
Write-in		142	0.4
Total votes		39,040	100.0
Democratic hold			

=== 2017 special ===
2017 New York State Assembly special election, District 71
Party	Candidate	Votes	%
Democratic	Al Taylor	16,153	
Working Families	Al Taylor	1,673	
Total	Al Taylor	17,826	99.4
Write-in		106	0.6
Total votes		17,932	100.0
Democratic hold			

=== 2016 ===
2016 New York State Assembly election, District 71
Party	Candidate	Votes	%
Democratic	Herman D. Farrell Jr. (incumbent)	43,183	92.3
Republican	Vanessa Stanback	2,758	
Reform	Vanessa Stanback	758	
Total	Vanessa Stanback	3,516	7.5
Write-in		70	0.4
Total votes		46,769	100.0
Democratic hold			

=== 2014 ===
2014 New York State Assembly election, District 71
Primary election
Party	Candidate	Votes	%
Democratic	Herman D. Farrell Jr. (incumbent)	5,551	70.5
Democratic	Kelley Boyd	2,237	28.4
Write-in		83	1.1
Total votes		7,871	100.0
General election
Democratic	Herman D. Farrell Jr. (incumbent)	16,174	93.3
Republican	Jerome Johnson	1,131	6.5
Write-in		24	0.1
Total votes		17,329	100.0
Democratic hold			

=== 2012 ===
2012 New York State Assembly election, District 71
Party	Candidate	Votes	%
Democratic	Herman D. Farrell Jr. (incumbent)	36,220	99.8
Write-in		68	0.2
Total votes		36,288	100.0
Democratic hold			
