= New York's 30th State Senate district =

American legislative district

Senator
Cordell Cleare; D–Harlem
- Registration: 79.2% Democratic; 4.0% Republican; 13.9% No party preference
- Demographics: 21% White; 39% Black; 31% Hispanic; 6% Asian
- Population (2017): 348,896
- Registered voters: 241,635

New York's 30th State Senate district is one of 63 districts in the New York State Senate. It has been represented by Democrat Cordell Cleare since 2021.

== Geography ==
District 30 is primarily based in Harlem in northern Manhattan, but also includes portions of East Harlem, the Upper West Side, Morningside Heights, Hamilton Heights, and Washington Heights.

The district overlaps with New York's 10th, 12th, and 13th congressional districts, and with the 67th, 68th, 69th, 70th, 71st, and 72nd districts of the New York State Assembly.

== Recent election results ==
=== 2026 ===
2026 New York State Senate election, District 30
Party	Candidate	Votes	%
Democratic	Cordell Cleare		
Working Families	Cordell Cleare		
Total	Cordell Cleare (incumbent)		
Write-in			
Total votes			100.0

=== 2024 ===
2024 New York State Senate election, District 30
Party	Candidate	Votes	%
Democratic	Cordell Cleare	80,476	
Working Families	Cordell Cleare	10,047	
Total	Cordell Cleare (incumbent)	90,523	99.5
Write-in		422	0.5
Total votes		90,945	100.0
Democratic hold			

=== 2022 ===
2022 New York State Senate election, District 30
Primary election
Party	Candidate	Votes	%
Democratic	Cordell Cleare (incumbent)	13,686	69.9
Democratic	Shana Harmongoff	5,711	29.2
Write-in		185	0.9
Total votes		19,582	100.0
General election
Democratic	Cordell Cleare	55,813	
Working Families	Cordell Cleare	5,936	
Total	Cordell Cleare (incumbent)	61,749	99.6
Write-in		253	0.4
Total votes		62,002	100.0
Democratic hold			

=== 2021 special ===
Then-incumbent senator Brian Benjamin resigned in 2021 after being appointed by Kathy Hochul as Lieutenant Governor of New York, rooting from the resignation of Andrew Cuomo. The special election was held on the same day as general citywide elections, including the mayoral, city council and borough presidential elections.

In special elections for state legislative offices, primaries are usually not held - county committee members for each party select nominees.

2021 New York State Senate special election, District 30
Party	Candidate	Votes	%
Democratic	Cordell Cleare	43,148	88.6
Republican	Oz Sultan	2,896	5.9
Hope 4 NY	Shana Harmongoff	2,560	5.3
Write-in		106	0.2
Total votes		48,710	100.0
Democratic hold			

=== 2020 ===
2020 New York State Senate election, District 30
Party	Candidate	Votes	%
Democratic	Brian Benjamin (incumbent)	115,397	93.1
Republican	Oz Sultan	8,477	6.8
Write-in		148	0.1
Total votes		124,022	100.0
Democratic hold			

=== 2018 ===
2018 New York State Senate election, District 30
Party	Candidate	Votes	%
Democratic	Brian Benjamin	55,813	
Working Families	Brian Benjamin	5,936	
Total	Brian Benjamin (incumbent)	96,528	99.6
Write-in		362	0.4
Total votes		96,890	100.0
Democratic hold			

=== 2017 special ===
2017 New York State Senate special election, District 30
Party	Candidate	Votes	%
Democratic	Brian Benjamin	8,106	91.2
Republican	Dawn Simmons	287	3.2
Write-in	Joyce Johnson	261	2.9
Reform	Ruben Vargas	190	2.1
Write-in		47	0.6
Total votes		8,891	100.0
Democratic hold			

=== 2016 ===
2016 New York State Senate election, District 30
Party	Candidate	Votes	%
Democratic	Bill Perkins	107,425	
Working Families	Bill Perkins	5,719	
Total	Bill Perkins (incumbent)	113,144	95.1
Republican	Jon Girodes	5,619	4.7
Write-in		269	0.2
Total votes		118,894	100.0
Democratic hold			

=== 2014 ===
2014 New York State Senate election, District 30
Party	Candidate	Votes	%
Democratic	Bill Perkins	39,534	
Working Families	Bill Perkins	5,437	
Total	Bill Perkins (incumbent)	44,971	95.0
Republican	Jon Girodes	2,338	4.9
Write-in		64	0.1
Total votes		47,373	100.0
Democratic hold			

=== 2012 ===
2012 New York State Senate election, District 30
Party	Candidate	Votes	%
Democratic	Bill Perkins	94,489	
Working Families	Bill Perkins	3,651	
Total	Bill Perkins (incumbent)	98,140	99.9
Write-in		141	0.1
Total votes		98,281	100.0
Democratic hold			

=== Federal results in District 30 ===
Year	Office	Results
2020	President	Biden 91.9 – 6.9%
2016	President	Clinton 93.7 – 4.0%
2012	President	Obama 95.3 – 3.8%
2012	Senate	Gillibrand 95.5 – 3.4%
