= Kristin Richardson Jordan =

American activist, poet, and politician

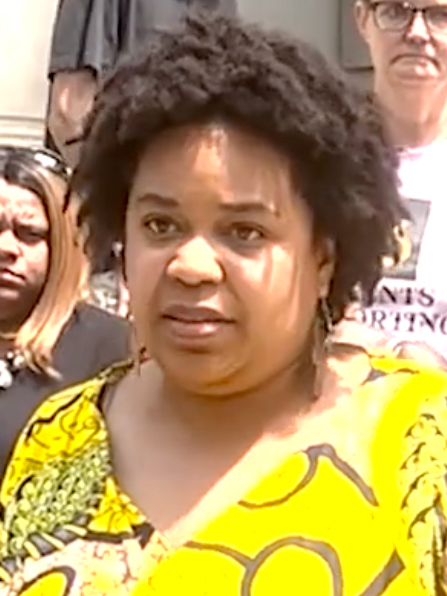
- Jordan in 2022

Member of the New York City Council from the 9th district
- In office January 1, 2022 – December 31, 2023
- Preceded by: Bill Perkins
- Succeeded by: Yusef Salaam

Personal details
- Born: January 3, 1987 (age 39) Baltimore, Maryland, U.S.
- Party: Democratic
- Other political affiliations: Democratic Socialists of America; Party for Socialism and Liberation
- Relatives: Lynne D. Richardson (mother)
- Education: Brown University (BA)

Kristin Richardson Jordan (born January 3, 1987) is an American former politician who was the Council member for New York City's 9th City Council district from 2022 to 2024. Jordan identifies as a democratic socialist and police abolitionist. In her 2021 race for the New York City Council, she campaigned on a platform of "radical love."

== Early life and education ==
Jordan was born in Baltimore, Maryland, in 1987 to physicians Lynne D. Richardson and Desmond Jordan. Her parents were both raised in Harlem, and the family returned after her father's internship at Johns Hopkins University, where she grew up. She graduated from the Calhoun School and then from Brown University in 2009, double-majoring in Africana studies and literary arts.

Jordan is a published poet, a reform activist, and a lesbian.

== Career ==
Jordan ran for New York City Council in 2021 against incumbent Council member Bill Perkins, narrowly defeating him in the Democratic primary, virtually assuring her election in the overwhelmingly Democratic district.

Jordan was a member of the New York City chapter of Democratic Socialists of America (DSA), but was not endorsed by that organization, as it wanted to focus support on other candidates in that year's elections. Jordan had previously been a member of the Party for Socialism and Liberation prior to joining DSA.

Jordan served one term as a New York City Councillor and her term was marked by intense controversy over many of her comments. On May 16, 2023, Jordan announced that she would not run for reelection to the New York City Council. According to Charles Barron, an ally of hers on the Council, she was "dropping out" of politics entirely.

== Controversies ==
Jordan was criticized in the aftermath of a fatal shooting in her district in which two Hispanic NYPD police officers, Jason Rivera and Wilbert Mora, were shot and killed in a domestic disturbance call; she chose instead of addressing it to issue tweets about a local community garden. After criticism by residents, she said that she was told not to tweet about the slain officers.

Several days later, she publicly sent condolences to the family of Lashawn McNeil, the alleged killer, who was shot and killed by a third officer, alongside with condolences to the families of the fallen cops. Explaining her motivation, Jordan stated "I mourn the loss of literally all human life. I don’t see it as contradictory to mourn the life lost of Lashawn as well as the lives of Officer Rivera and Officer Mora."

In February 2022, Jordan was criticized for seeking to justify the 2022 Russian invasion of Ukraine by claiming that the 2014 Revolution of Dignity was a coup led by the United States, the European Union, and NATO. She said, "In 2014, the U.S. helped overthrow Ukraine’s democratically elected leader in an illegal coup, helped install a fascist government and empowered a far right military all with the goal of destabilizing Russia."

On housing, Jordan has said that she "would rather have lots sit empty than have them filled with further gentrification." In summer 2022, Jordan helped block a 1,000-unit housing development which would have consisted of 50% affordable housing and a civil rights museum. Jordan's rationale was that said "what they're calling affordable is [not] actually affordable to the community," as only 12% of the units were earmarked for individuals earning 30% of the area median income. Jordan said she would only support projects where more than half of all units were earmarked for individuals earning less than 30% of New York median income. After the developer, Bruce Teitelbaum, agreed to make half the units affordable, Jordan asked for 100% affordable units, which was refused. As an alternative, a truck depot was placed under construction, planned to open in December 2022. The depot opened in January 2023.

By mid-2023, Jordan had a severe absenteeism issue. Colleagues criticized her for being "completely MIA" after she missed nearly half of her assigned committee meetings and voting sessions, with critics calling her attendance negligent to her district.

In 2023, Jordan received significant criticism for pushing a bill to rename the intersection of 127th Street and Lenox Avenue in Harlem after Elijah Muhammad, the former leader of the Nation of Islam, who expressed anti-Semitic and anti-White viewpoints, among other controversial statements. The Southern Poverty Law Center, a nonprofit legal advocacy group known for classifying hate groups, has said that Elijah Muhammad had called Jews "greedy," and spread the false claim that they had been the ones responsible for the death of Jesus Christ. In addition, city Councilmember David Carr, beyond just citing the Southern Poverty Law Center's words on the Nation of Islam spreading hatred, called it "dishonorable" to name the street after Muhammad when the site had been the location of an NYPD cop being murdered by NOI members in 1972.

== See also ==
- LGBT culture in New York City
- List of LGBT people from New York City
