= Al Taylor (politician) =

American politician

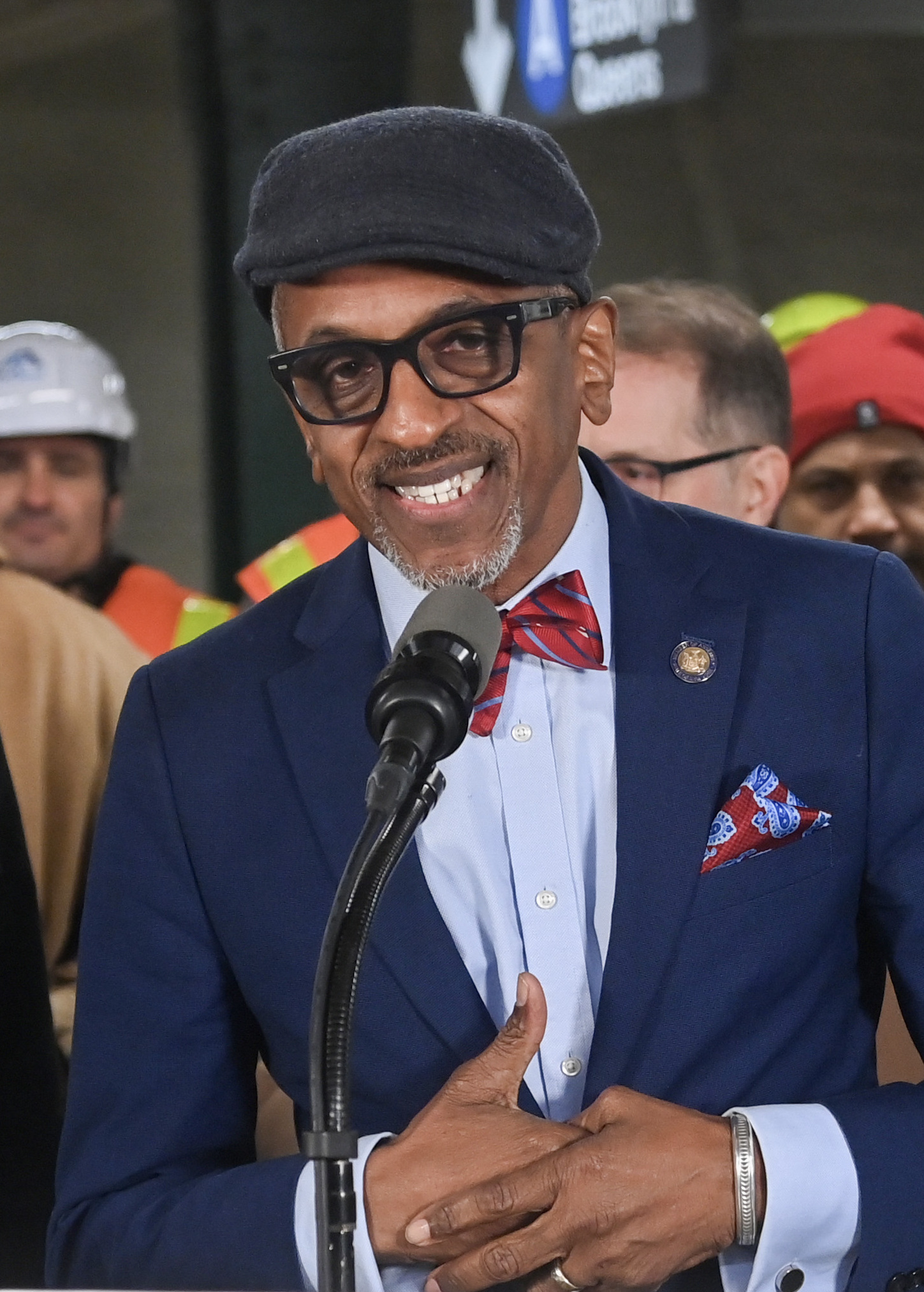
- Taylor in 2023

Member of the New York State Assembly from the 71st district
- Incumbent
- Assumed office November 16, 2017
- Preceded by: Herman D. Farrell Jr.

Personal details
- Born: Alfred Taylor; August 12, 1957 (age 69) New York City, New York, U.S.
- Party: Democratic
- Spouse: Gwendolyn Taylor
- Children: 5
- Education: Lehman College (BA); Alliance University (MDiv)
- Website: State Assembly website

Military service
- Branch/service: United States Army
- Unit: Military Police Corps

Alfred E. Taylor (born August 12, 1957) is an American politician serving as a member of the New York State Assembly for the 71st district. A Democrat, Taylor's district includes portions of Hamilton Heights, Harlem, Washington Heights, and Inwood.

== Early life and education ==
A lifelong resident of Harlem, Taylor was a troubled youth who was able to turn to judge Bruce Wright, who mentored him and gave him an interest in community service. Taylor then served in the Military Police Corps while earning his GED, then graduated from Lehman College. He later earned a Master of Divinity, with a concentration in church development, from the Alliance Theological Seminary.

== Career ==
Taylor served for many years as the chief of staff for his predecessor, Herman D. Farrell Jr., while also serving as a Democratic district leader and as the pastor of Infinity Mennonite Church.

=== New York State Assembly ===
Farrell, first elected in 1974, decided to step down midterm in 2017 at the age of 85. Taylor, his chief of staff, had long been seen as the heir apparent for the seat. With Farrell vacating the seat midterm, New York state law allowed for the Democratic District committee for the Assembly district to select the candidate for the general election, bypassing a primary for seat. Taylor, being the district leader, who ultimately leads the district committee, easily was chosen as the candidate.

Taylor won the seat unopposed, and was sworn in soon after. Taylor was re-elected in 2018 after running unopposed.

A new purportedly grassroots non-profit organization, "New York 4 Harlem", that actively solicited donations of $500 to $5,000 was reported in 2018 to allegedly have been a front for Taylor and three other Harlem elected officials. In addition, a flyer organizing a free bus trip to Albany for a conference organized by the New York State Association of Black and Puerto Rican Legislators with New York 4 Harlem's name on it featured a picture of Taylor and the three other officials. Nonprofit organizations are not allowed to take part in campaign activity. The contact person for the event was a staffer working in the office of one of the other three legislators.

== Criticism ==
Taylor has received scrutiny from pro-choice and LGBT groups over his stances on abortion and gay rights. In 2019, he was one of seven Democrats in the State Assembly to vote against the Reproductive Health Act, and he voted against the Equal Rights Amendment prior to voting for it in 2023 in the lead-up to a competitive primary for the City Council's 9th District.

He has also faced criticism over his refusal to perform same-sex marriages in his capacity as pastor of Harlem's Infinity Mennonite Church.
