= Ken Jenkins (politician) =

American politician (born 1961)

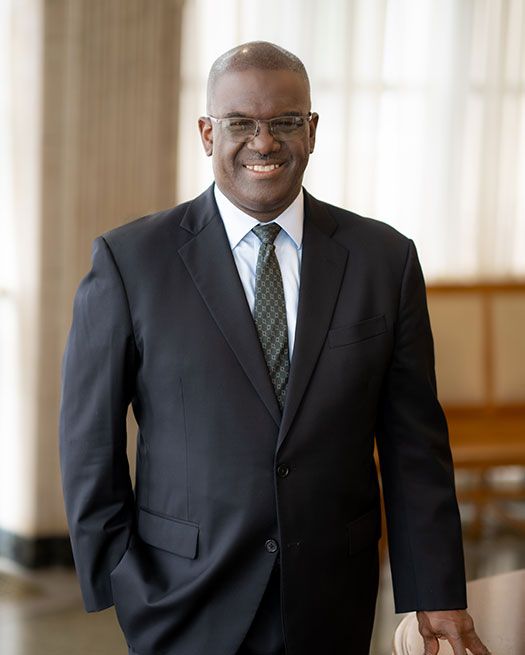

10th Westchester County Executive
- Incumbent
- Assumed office January 6, 2025
- Deputy: Joan McDonald
- Preceded by: George Latimer

Deputy Westchester County Executive
- In office January 1, 2018 – January 6, 2025
- Preceded by: Kevin Plunkett
- Succeeded by: Richard Wishnie

Chair of the Westchester County Board of Legislators
- In office January 1, 2010 – December 31, 2013
- Preceded by: William Ryan
- Succeeded by: Mike Kaplowitz

Member of the Westchester County Board of Legislators from the 16th district
- In office January 1, 2007 – December 31, 2017
- Preceded by: Andrea Stewart-Cousins
- Succeeded by: Christopher Johnson

Personal details
- Born: May 26, 1961 (age 65)
- Party: Democratic
- Spouse: Deborah Hudson (m. 1982)
- Children: 3
- Education: Iona University (BS)
- Website: Office website Campaign website

Kenneth Warren Jenkins (born May 26, 1961) is an American politician who has been serving as the 10th and current Westchester county executive since January 6, 2025. He is a member of the Democratic Party.

He previously served as Deputy County Executive from 2018 to 2025, but after his predecessor, George Latimer, resigned on January 2, 2025 to take his seat as member of Congress for New York's 16th district, lawmakers selected Jenkins to fill the position until a special election in February 2025. In February 2025, Jenkins won a special election to retain his role as county executive. He is the first Black person to serve as Westchester County Executive.

== Early life and career ==
Jenkins graduated from Iona University in New Rochelle, New York with a bachelor's degree in computer science and information systems in 1995. He had previously attended Fordham Preparatory School in The Bronx, New York. After graduating college, Jenkins held various technical and administrative positions at companies including Verizon New York and Apple.

Jenkins also served as the president of the National Association for the Advancement of Colored People's Yonkers branch. However, he was asked to stand down from his position in 1995 after he joined former Yonkers Mayor Terence M. Zaleski at a press event where he said busing students had "outlived its usefulness" in the city. Jenkins's comments were met with criticism by organization leaders who argued busing policies were necessary to pursue desegregation policies in Yonkers. The next year, the NAACP executive barred him from holding office in the organization for four years.

== Political career ==
Jenkins formally entered county politics in 2007 when he succeeded Andrea Stewart-Cousins on the Westchester County Board of Legislators, representing the 16th district which includes much of western Yonkers. He had previously run unsuccessfully for Yonkers City Council president in 1997. Jenkins was elected as Chairman of the Board of Legislators in 2010 and served in the post until 2013.

In 2016, Jenkins announced he would challenge incumbent Westchester County Executive Rob Astorino in the next year's election. He had previously attempted to win the Democratic nomination for county executive in 2013, but failed to garner enough support at the party convention and lost the nomination to New Rochelle Mayor Noam Bramson. Jenkins and Astorino had clashed multiple times during the former's tenure as Board of Legislators chairman in lawsuits including ones challenging Astorino's capital projects, county transportation and his authority to oversee the management of Playland Amusement Park. However, Jenkins lost his primary bid for county executive to then-State Senator Latimer, who also went on to unseat Astorino. However, after taking office Latimer appointed Jenkins as deputy county executive. While serving as deputy county executive, Jenkins also held a number of other positions including Chair of the New York State Independent Redistricting Commission and Treasurer of the New York State Democratic Committee.

Latimer resigned as Westchester County Executive on January 2, 2025 after being elected to Congress to represent New York's 16th congressional seat. Latimer was briefly succeeded by County Emergency Services Commissioner Richard G. Wishnie, but county legislators unanimously voted for Jenkins to serve as executive until a special election could be held on February 11, 2025. Jenkins had previously announced he would run in that special election after Latimer won his congressional race.

Jenkins won a February 12, 2025 special election for county executive, beating Republican Party candidate Christine Sculti with over 60 percent of the vote. Later that November, Jenkins won his first full term as County Executive in the general election.

== Electoral results ==
1997 Yonkers City Council President election
Party	Candidate	Votes	%
Republican	Vincenza Restiano	17,656	48.50
Conservative	Vincenza Restiano	3,703	10.17
Independence	Vincenza Restiano	916	2.52
American Freedom	Vincenza Restiano	309	0.85
Total	Vincenza Restiano	22,584	62.04
Democratic	Ken Jenkins	12,410	34.09
Right to Life	Edward Stanton	1,092	3.00
People's Choice	Joey Bera	317	0.87
Write-in		1	0.00
Total votes		36,404	100.00
Republican hold			

2007 Westchester County Legislator election, District 16
Party	Candidate	Votes	%
Democratic	Ken Jenkins	4,257	87.90
Independence	Ken Jenkins	378	7.81
Working Families	Ken Jenkins	204	4.21
Total	Ken Jenkins	4,839	99.92
Write-in		4	0.08
Total votes		4,843	100.00
Democratic hold			

2009 Westchester County Legislator election, District 16
Party	Candidate	Votes	%
Democratic	Ken Jenkins	3,719	82.37
Independence	Ken Jenkins	285	6.31
Conservative	Ken Jenkins	347	7.69
Working Families	Ken Jenkins	164	3.63
Total	Ken Jenkins	4,515	100.00
Total votes		4,515	100.00
Democratic hold			

2011 Westchester County Legislator election, District 16
Party	Candidate	Votes	%
Democratic	Ken Jenkins	4,638	81.52
Working Families	Ken Jenkins	509	8.95
Independence	Ken Jenkins	495	8.71
Total	Ken Jenkins	5,642	99.23
Write-in		44	0.77
Total votes		5,686	100.00
Democratic hold			

Westchester County Executive, 2013 Democratic Convention Vote (First Round & Second Round)
Party	Candidate	Votes	%
First Round
Democratic	Noam Bramson	90,019.5	49.53
Democratic	Ken Jenkins	77,224	42.49
Democratic	William Ryan	14,489	7.97
Total votes		181,732.5	100.00
Second Round
Democratic	Noam Bramson	97,950.5	54.97
Democratic	Ken Jenkins	80,249	45.03
Total votes		178,199.5	100.00

2013 Westchester County Legislator election, District 16
Party	Candidate	Votes	%
Democratic	Ken Jenkins	4,232	88.22
Working Families	Ken Jenkins	263	5.48
Independence	Ken Jenkins	275	5.74
Total	Ken Jenkins	4,770	99.44
Write-in		27	0.56
Total votes		4,797	100.00
Democratic hold			

2015 Westchester County Legislator election, District 16
Party	Candidate	Votes	%
Democratic	Ken Jenkins	3,807	89.10
Working Families	Ken Jenkins	210	4.91
Independence	Ken Jenkins	157	3.67
Women's Equality	Ken Jenkins	62	1.46
Total	Ken Jenkins	4,236	99.13
Write-in		37	0.87
Total votes		4,273	100.00
Democratic hold			

Westchester County Executive, 2017 Democratic Primary election
Party	Candidate	Votes	%
Democratic	George S. Latimer	24,466	62.64
Democratic	Ken Jenkins	14,316	36.66
Write-in		275	0.70
Total votes		39,057	100.00

2025 Westchester County Executive Special election
Party	Candidate	Votes	%
Democratic	Ken Jenkins	60,020	63.69
Republican	Christine Sculti	34,175	36.27
Write-in		35	0.04
Total votes		94,230	100.00
Democratic hold			

2025 Westchester County Executive General election
Party	Candidate	Votes	%
Democratic	Ken Jenkins	125,005	67.71
Republican	Christine Sculti	59,606	32.29
Total votes		184,608	100.00
Democratic hold			
