= David Tubiolo =

American politician

David J. Tubiolo

Member of the Westchester County Board of Legislators from the 14th district
- Incumbent
- Assumed office September 8, 2016
- Preceded by: Bernice Spreckman

Personal details
- Born: September 10, 1987 (age 38) Yonkers, New York, U.S.
- Party: Democratic (2020–present); Republican (until 2020)
- Education: Syracuse University (BA)
- Occupation: Politician
- Committees: Former Chair of Seniors & Constituents; Chair of Parks and Recreation
- Website: Campaign website Official website

Military service
- Allegiance: United States
- Branch/service: United States Army
- Years of service: 2023–present
- Rank: 2nd Lieutenant

David J. Tubiolo (born September 10, 1987) is a Democratic politician from Yonkers, New York. He is a member of the Westchester County Board of Legislators from the 14th District and represents portions of Mount Vernon, New York, and Yonkers, New York. He served as Chair of the Seniors & Constituents Committee from 2017 to 2019, and now is Chair of the Parks & Environment Committee since 2020.

== Early life and education ==
Tubiolo was born in New York City, and grew up in Yonkers, New York. He graduated from Fordham Preparatory School and Syracuse University. He earned his B.A. in history from Syracuse University.

== Political career and background ==
Tubiolo spent five years as the principal legislative aide and community liaison for County Legislator Bernice Spreckman and was elected to the Westchester County Board of Legislators in his own right during an August 2016 special election.

Tubiolo ran for re-election in 2017 and defeated his opponent Gwen Dean by 1003 votes. Tubiolo in February 2020, switched from the Republican to Democratic Party on the Westchester County Board of Legislators. Tubiolo is a former president of the Untermyer Performing Arts Council (UPAC), he is currently Vice-President of the Yonkers Exchange Club, vice-president of the Second Precinct Community Council, and a board member of the Hyatt Association, the Sons of Italy Calandra Lodge and the Parish Council of St. Barnabas Church.

On February 7, 2020, Tubiolo formally changed his party from Republican to Democratic at the Westchester County Democratic Headquarters. Tubiolo laid some blame to President Donald Trump stating, “I cannot blame Donald Trump alone for all of the problems this country faces, but his actions have created unprecedented divisiness and an atmosphere of intolerance that must change, I will not sit by idly and watch everything I stand for erode away while immoral policies like child separation are handed down from Washington. Our children and families should be protected above all else. That means addressing crushing student loan debt, making corporations pay their fair share, stronger gun laws and comprehensive policies to protect workers from automation, that means paid parental leave for all employees. That means an absolute right to participate in organized labor. That means health care that is accessible to everyone, without interference with private medical decisions. That means respecting and protecting every immutable trait, from religion to gender identity. That means everyone has the opportunity to pursue the American dream, regardless of where they were born.”

After the switch, Doug Colety, chairman of the county Republicans, stated:

“It’s a betrayal of the voters who elected him in past elections,” Colety said in a phone interview. “He was elected as a Republican with Republican values and he abandoned the people and principles that brought him to victory.”

https://www.lohud.com/story/news/politics/2020/02/08/westchester-county-board-of-legislators-david-tubiolo/4694323002/

== COVID-19 Diagnosis ==
Tubiolo tested positive for COVID-19 on October 7, 2020. He was the first Westchester County elected official to test positive for COVID-19. As a result, Westchester County Executive George Latimer postponed his State of the County from October 8, 2020 to October 22, 2020. On October 11, 2020, Tubiolo subsequently tested negative for COVID-19 that evening.

== Electoral history ==
Westchester County Legislator - District 14, 2021
Party	Candidate	Votes	%	±%
Democratic	David J. Tubiolo	3895	98.7%	Democratic hold

Westchester County Legislator - District 14, 2019
Party	Candidate	Votes	%	±%
Republican	David J. Tubiolo	4116	98.6	Republican hold

Westchester County Legislator - District 14, 2017
Party	Candidate	Votes	%	±%
Democratic	Gwen Dean	4162	44.6	
Republican	David J. Tubiolo	5165	55.2	Republican hold

Westchester County Legislator - District 14, 2016
Party	Candidate	Votes	%	±%
Democratic	Christine Peters	1288	37.7	
Republican	David J. Tubiolo	2129	62.3	Republican hold

== See also ==
- List of American politicians who switched parties in office
