= Westchester County Democratic Committee =

- Chairperson: Suzanne Berger
- Westchester County Executive: Kenneth Jenkins
- Deputy Westchester County Executive: Richard G. Wishnie
- Chairman of the Board of Legislators: Vedat Gashi
- Vice Chairman of the Board of Legislators: Jose Alvarada
- Membership (2020): ▲631,822
- Ideology: Centrism; Modern liberalism Progressivism
- National affiliation: Democratic Party
- Colors: Blue
- Westchester County Board of Legislators: 15 / 17

Website
- westchesterdems.org

The Westchester County Democratic Committee is the affiliate of the Democratic Party in the state of New York. Its headquarters is in White Plains, New York.
