= 2021 Westchester County Executive election =

- November 2, 2021
- Turnout: 35.8% ▼
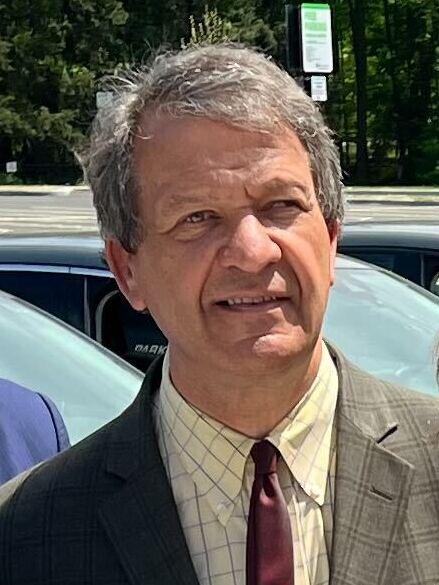

Candidate	George Latimer	Christine Sculti
Party	Democratic	Republican
Popular vote	103,608	62,234
Percentage	60.75%	36.49%
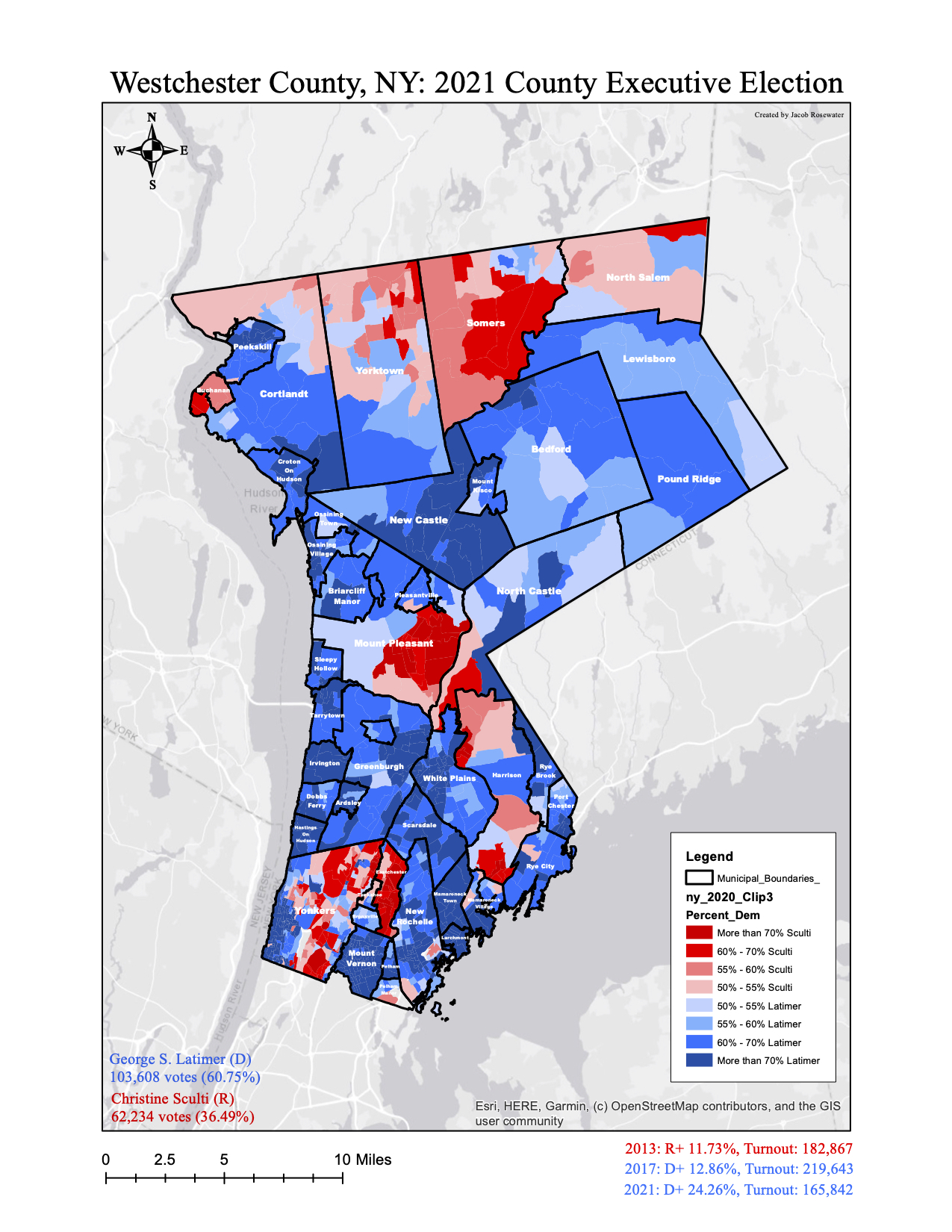
County Executive before election
George Latimer
Democratic
Elected County Executive
George Latimer
Democratic

The 2021 Westchester County Executive election was held on November 2, 2021. The election was between incumbent county executive George Latimer and former advisor to former county executive Rob Astorino Christine Sculti. The elections were held on the same day as elections for Westchester County Board of Legislators. Latimer defeated Sculti by a comfortable margin.

== General election ==
2021 Westchester County Executive election
Party	Candidate	Votes	Percentage
Democratic	George S. Latimer	97,508	58.80%
Working Families	George S. Latimer	6,100	3.68%
Total	George S. Latimer (incumbent)	103,608	62.47%
Republican	Christine Sculti	60,141	36.26%
Conservative	Christine Sculti	2,093	1.26%
Total	Christine Sculti	62,234	37.53%
Totals		165,842 (Note: Excluding "irregular" ballots)	100.00%
Democratic hold			
