= 2013 Westchester County Executive election =

- November 6, 2013
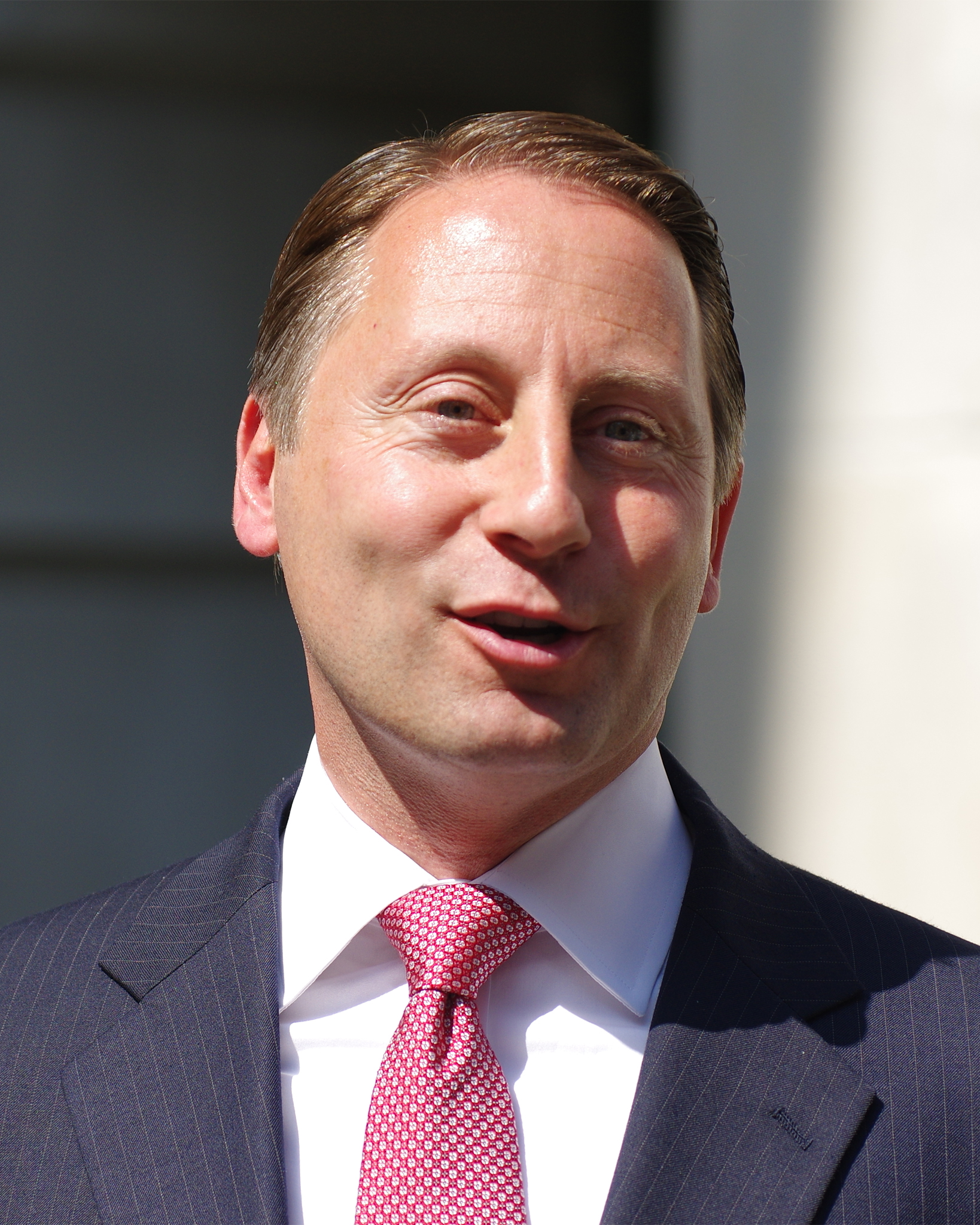

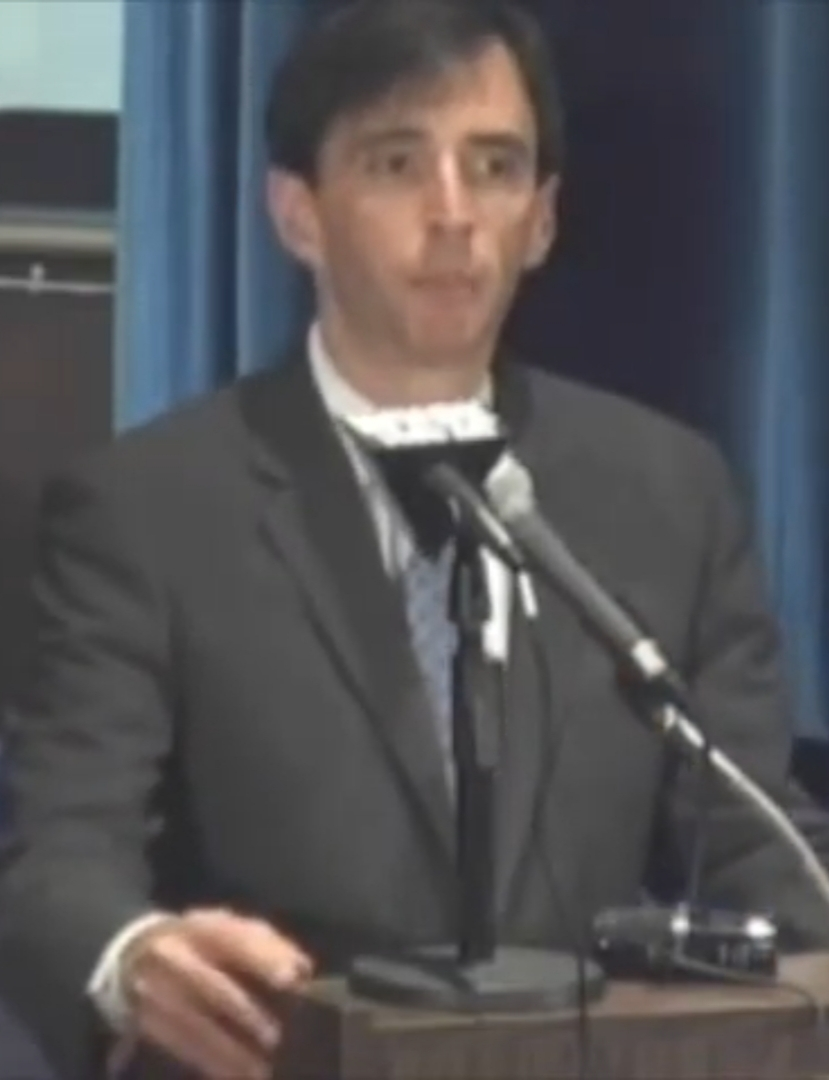
Nominee	Rob Astorino	Noam Bramson
Party	Republican	Democratic
Popular vote	102,505	80,362
Percentage	56.03%	43.92%
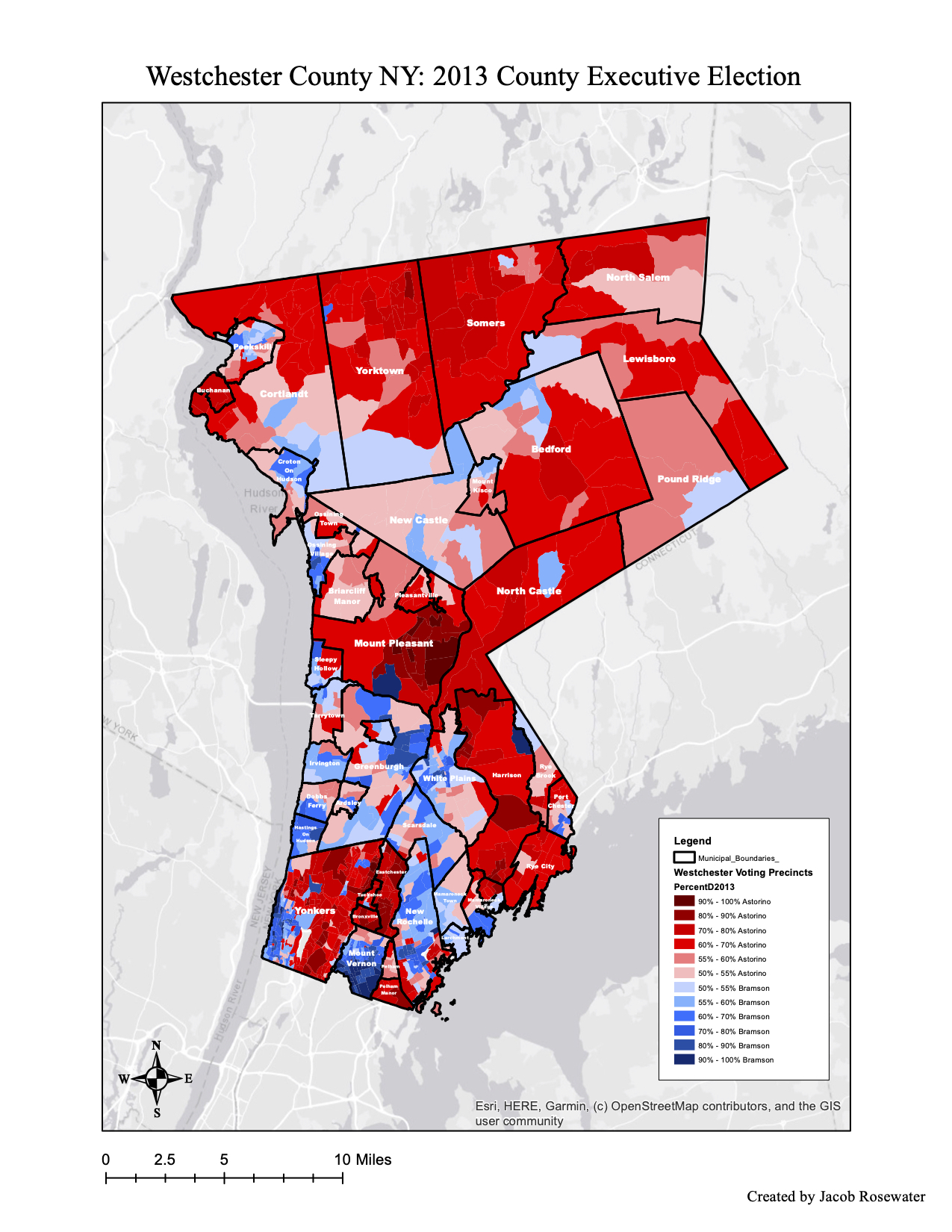
County Executive before election
Rob Astorino
Republican
Elected County Executive
Rob Astorino
Republican

The 2013 Westchester County Executive election was held on November 6, 2013. Incumbent GOP County Executive Rob Astorino won re-election over Noam Bramson, the Mayor of New Rochelle and Democratic nominee, by a margin of 12 percentage points. As of 2026, this is the most recent time a Republican was elected Westchester County Executive.

== Primary elections ==
=== Democratic ===
The Westchester County Democrats held a nominating convention at the Westchester County Center in White Plains on April 24, 2013. After none of the three candidates reached a majority in the first round, third place William Ryan was eliminated and voting continued into the early hours of April 25. In the end, Mayor of New Rochelle Noam Bramson emerged as the victor over runner-up Ken Jenkins, a county legislator.

==== First round results ====
Democratic convention first round results
Party	Candidate	Votes	%
Democratic	Noam Bramson	90,020	49.53%
Democratic	Kenneth Jenkins	77,224	42.49%
Democratic	William Ryan	14,489	7.97%
Total votes		181,733	100.00

==== Second round results ====
Democratic convention second round results
Party	Candidate	Votes	%
Democratic	Noam Bramson	97,951	54.97%
Democratic	Kenneth Jenkins	80,249	45.03%
Total votes		181,733	100.00

=== Republican ===
Astorino was not opposed by another Republican thus the primary was cancelled.

== General election ==
Candidates' vote share
1. Rob Astorino (56.0%)
2. Noam Bramson (43.9%)
3. Write-ins (0.05%)

On November 6, 2013, Astorino defeated Bramson, 56%–44%. Bramson conceded by 10:30pm while Astorino celebrated at his watch party. As of 2022, this was the last time any Republican has won Westchester County.

2013 Westchester County Executive election
Party	Candidate	Votes	%
Republican	Rob Astorino	88,645	48.45%
Conservative	Rob Astorino	13,860	7.58%
Total	Rob Astorino (incumbent)	102,505	56.03%
Democratic	Noam Bramson	74,964	40.97%
Working Families	Noam Bramson	2,907	1.59%
Independence	Noam Bramson	2,491	1.36%
Total	Noam Bramson	80,362	43.92%
Write-ins	N/A	88	0.05%
Total votes		182,955	100.00%
Republican hold			
