= Mike Kaplowitz =

American lawyer

Member of the Westchester County Board of Legislators from the 4th District
- In office January 1, 1998 – December 31, 2019
- Preceded by: Andrew J. Donovan
- Succeeded by: Vedat Gashi

Personal details
- Born: Michael B. Kaplowitz; September 3, 1959 (age 67)
- Party: Democratic
- Spouse: Jayne Kaplowitz
- Children: 2
- Occupation: Financial Planner; Lawyer; Politician
- Website: www.mikekaplowitz.com

Michael B. Kaplowitz (born September 3, 1959) is an American lawyer, financial planner and Democratic politician from Somers, New York. He was a member of the Westchester County Board of Legislators and represented portions of New Castle, Somers and Yorktown. He served as Chair of the Board from 2014 to 2017.

== Political career and background ==
He and his wife Jayne have lived in Somers since 1989 and they have two daughters who attend the Somers Public Schools. He is a member of the March of Dimes Walk America, the American Red Cross, the Partnership Fund for Aging Services and several area Chambers of Commerce. He earned his B.A. in history from the University of Pennsylvania in 1981 and his J.D. from the Boston University School of Law in 1984. He also became a C.F.P. in 1986.

Kaplowitz has labeled his years of business experience his "guiding star" for the decisions that he makes as a County legislator. After a career in business Kaplowitz decided to run for an open seat on the Westchester County board of legislators in 1997 in the district that encompasses the hamlets of Chappaqua and Millwood in the town of New Castle; Amawalk, Baldwin Place, Granite Springs, Lincolndale, and Shenorock in the town of Somers; and Crompond, Jefferson Valley, Kichtawan and Yorktown Heights in the town of Yorktown.

He ultimately won a razor-thin 35 vote victory over RoseMarie Panio, who was the Yorktown GOP chairwoman. His positions on preserving the County's last opportunities for open space and to conservation issues have earned him praise from environmentalist organizations around the region and the endorsement of the New York League of Conservation Voters in all of his campaigns. He is also involved in legislative effort to keep the issue of sewage diversion & upgrade a priority and supports converting Indian Point Energy Center to a non-nuclear facility. He is a self-described "fiscal conservative."

=== Budget committee accomplishments ===
Kaplowitz was appointed as Chair of the Budget & Appropriations Committee in 2003. He stated that is a supporter of "tax fairness" and has always supported sales tax over property tax, although in May 1998, Kaplowitz was one of four legislators who voted against a sales tax amnesty on clothing costing less than $500. In October 1998, Kaplowitz voted against taking part in a temporary state moratorium on sales tax, suggesting that property taxes would need to be increased substantially if the county did otherwise. Opponents argued that by cutting spending, the board could have made up for the lost sales tax revenue. Due to the settlement of the State of New York's case against tobacco industry, the country board was able to lower property taxes by close to 1% in 1999.

Kaplowitz's campaign states that he worked to forge partnerships among the State, County, local municipalities and school districts for shared sales tax revenue in an attempt to lower the local property tax burden. Kaplowitz took part in winning relief for 354 Northern Westchester homeowners who were paying sewer taxes despite never being hooked up to sewers. In 1999, Kaplowitz's opponent claimed that he backed a $3.5 million plan to install sewers in an enclave outside of his district, while a plan to service the 354 residents of his district that he saved from sewer taxes who were still without service went unresolved.

In 2000, Kaplowitz was able to support County Executive Andrew Spano's budget plan which included a 4.9% tax cut, the largest in country history, although it did include increases in sewer tax levies. However, in 2001, the tax cuts were wiped out after Kaplowitz enacted the proposal from the County Executive to increase the county sales tax by .25%, raise property taxes by 4%, and increase spending by 7.3%. County Executive Spano stated that "I didn't have anything to do with what happened to the economy, with what happened on September 11, with what happened to the state. Those are things I don't think anybody could have anticipated. … I think we did an appropriate and prudent thing in this budget." Kaplowitz joined the other Democrats on the board in taking Spano's plan a step further, raising taxes by an additional percentage point, while adding additional spending to keep open the Playland Ice Casino, and aid for mental health programs, libraries and programs for Latinos, women and the homeless that went beyond what Spano put in his budget.

In 2002, the county was faced with a proposed 31.7% increase in the amount the county raises through property taxes, the largest increase since 1968, the second largest in county history, and the second since Kaplowitz took office, which included a typical increase in the county property-tax rate to $4.59 per $1,000 of property value next year, from $3.83. Although legislators including Kaplowitz attempted to lobby the state for permission to increase sales taxes by 1% instead of increasing property taxes, the movement failed, and Kaplowitz voted in favor of the 14.8% property tax increase which passed just prior to the budget deadline.

As head of the budget committee, Kaplowitz highlighted that spending had risen only by 3.4% from 1998 to 2003. He voted in favor of the 30-cent monthly surcharge on cell phone bills, which generated $1.4 million to upgrade local emergency response systems. Kaplowitz was reelected, although his opponent stated that year, Westchester County had the highest property taxes in New York State, and the highest sales tax outside of New York City and Long Island, with a median property tax bill for an owner-occupied home in Westchester of $6,826 - the highest among the state's 57 counties and more than twice the statewide median of $2,847. As well, all of Westchester's 40 school districts raised their property taxes that year, on top of the 14.9 percent increase in the county property tax levy that Kaplowitz approved after the state rejected their request to hike the county portion of the sales tax by 1 point.

In late 2003, warned that another attempt to increase the lobby the New York State Assembly to increase sales tax would fail, Kaplowitz voted for the $1.4 billion budget which increased property taxes by 8.5% and sales taxes by 1%. The assembly members who represented Westchester in Albany said they opposed the higher sales tax, which was enough to defeat a similar proposal the previous year. Led by Assemblyman Richard Brodsky of Greenburgh, they suggested alternative tax and fee hikes to help balance the county budget, including raising the mortgage tax and extending the reach of the existing sales tax to cover items that are not now taxed.

The Assembly eventually agreed to raise the sales tax by half a percentage point instead of the one percentage increase requested in the budget approved by the board of legislators, and the record $1.4 billion spending plan adopted by the County legislature in December had included an 8.5 percent increase in the property-tax levy and assumed that additional revenues would come from the sales-tax increase. In early 2004, Kaplowitz voted in favor of the amended budget which raised county property tax collections by an additional 10 percent from the amount approved in December to offset the budget gap from the diminished sales tax increase, and when the measure passed, Westchester County ended with 18.82 percent more in property taxes during 2004 than it did in 2003.

In reaction to the second straight year of double digit property tax increases, Kaplowitz stated that as head of the budget committee "the spending hike reflected increases in state mandates such as higher Medicaid and pension fund costs. To cover other potential expenses, county lawmakers created an $11.8 million contingency fund. The fund could help pay for bus service should Albany fall to come through with extra aid, as well as help ball out the cash-strapped Westchester Medical Center and fund future raises for unionized employees." By setting money aside, lawmakers hoped to reassure credit agencies after Moody's placed the county's triple-A bond rating on 90-day ‘watch fist’ review, citing the county's liability for part of the medical center's debt. Kaplowitz said county officials enacted the second double-digit property tax hike of 14.8 percent in 2003 because the package of sales tax increases negotiated with state lawmakers would generate $50 million this year, leaving Westchester with a $22 million gap to fill, reflecting the contingency fund and a $10 million write-down of money owed to Westchester by the medical center for which the county will not be repaid. Kaplowitz stated that "Companies have bad years, and governments unfortunately have bad years. Hopeful, this is the end to two bad years in a row".

In 2004, the Budget Committee did not raise taxes for the first time in four years, although the budget did increase county spending by 4%. In 2005, County Executive Spano announced a plan to supplementing the state's actions to address the financially insolvent Westchester Medical Center. The proposal involved a refinancing of so-called "tobacco securitization bonds" that were sold in 1999 following the settlement of national lawsuits against tobacco manufacturers. The refinancing gave the medical center an immediate cash infusion of $27 million and a possible stream of future financial aid. Members of the legislature including Kaplowitz have taken credit for the measure, although it is commonly held that Spano, State Senator Nicholas A. Spano, and State Assemblyman Richard Brodsky were chiefly responsible for the bailout, which included an additional $75 million from county taxes, increased fees and state taxpayers from other municipalities.

The budget for 2006 included a raise in the property tax levy by 4.5%, with the total budget up 3.9% from 2005, in part from absorbing $14.4 million in bills for Westchester Medical Center, for overall county government budget of $1.54 billion. The ranks of county employees also would grow for the first time in eight years ago, from 4,560 to 4,655 workers. Republicans in the minority suggested spending cuts to avoid a tax increase, but Kaplowitz called the Republican calculations "unsustainable" and "unrealistic", stating "Today is decision day for the 2006 county budget. After negotiation, deliberation and, perhaps, consternation, the 17 members of the Board of Legislators will convene to decide what stays in the proposed $1.54 billion spending package, what goes, and what the final tally for taxpayers will be. I'm looking to cut and pare and slice and return to some fiscal sanity by paying for and investing in what we can afford and cutting out what we can and creating some real, practical financial discipline." In voting for the tax increase, Kaplowitz called it a plan that "meets the concerns of all Westchester residents". Much of the tax increase in the budget came from the absorption of $14.4 million in maintenance and other costs at Westchester Medical Center which Kaplowitz called "part of a 'long-term plan for viability' for the hospital", while the board's Republicans suggested the county could have collected those bills, pointing to the hospital's surplus for 2006.

The 2007 budget from Kaplowitz's committee increased property taxes by another 3.5%, under the $1.7b budget approved by the County Legislature. The budget included 77 new county jobs, and a 7.5 percent increase in the funding of nonprofit groups that run arts and human services programs for the county under contract. In late 2007, Bill Ryan, chairman of the County legislature, announced plans for a compensation package that would have raised his own pay by 90% and increased substantially the pay of his fellow legislators. To the opposition of Ryan and his fellow Democrats on the board, Kaplowitz, who initially defended the raises, later objected stating, "I don't believe a compelling case was sufficiently made to support a stipend increase. Further, there was not appropriate public notice given nor opportunity for timely public input. Therefore, a pay raise is not justified at this time." In 2005, the board voted to increase the stipend to the current $40,000, and board members also voted themselves a series of stipends for chairing committees and other leadership positions. The measure enacted in 2007 included another increase in base compensation, and boosted all of the board's other stipends, including raising the vice chair stipends from $12,000 to $15,000. Kaplowitz did not return any of the pay increase or the spending stipends he received.

The $1.77b budget adopted by Kaplowitz for 2008 again raised property taxes, this time by 3.89%, with an increase in spending of $4.2 million, for a variety of social services and health programs. Kaplowitz estimated that about three-quarters of the spending was to restore programs that had been removed by County Executive Spano. They included mental health services for children, eviction protection efforts and immigrant outreach services." Kaplowitz commented after the vote that "County taxpayers are buying an accountable government and essential services at a fair cost." He noted that it was the ninth time in ten years that the legislators lowered the County Executive's proposed tax levy increase, stating that "This budget reflects that we're meeting our public policy objective of creating budget certainty from year to year." However, the perpetual increases in property taxes created some controversy now that the Pepsi Bottling Group, located in Kaplowitz's home town of Somers, announced that it was challenging its tax assessment in court and considered relocating out of Westchester. Since 2000, real property taxes in Westchester have increased 54%.

=== Campaigns for New York State Senate ===
Kaplowitz has twice launched campaigns to represent the 40th district in the New York State Senate, a Hudson Valley seat which has traditionally leaned towards Republicans. In that effort, he has sought to recast himself as a fiscal conservative.

==== 2006 ====
In 2006, Kaplowitz launched an unsuccessful bid for higher office in the New York State Senate, 40th District, attempting to unseat Republican incumbent Vinnie Leibell. Kaplowitz was motivated to run for the seat by an election year which saw the region trend Democratic. Despite key upsets like the defeat of incumbent Republican Congresswoman Sue Kelly, Kaplowitz was not successful. He garnered 45.6% of the vote.

==== 2010 ====
In April 2010, Kaplowitz launched his campaign for New York State Senate, 40th District. Incumbent Senator Vincent Leibell ran for County Executive in Putnam County, making the 40th District an open seat.

Kaplowitz was opposed by Republican Assemblyman Greg Ball, a two-term state assembly member representing the 99th state Assembly District. Ball easily defeated Somers Town Supervisor Mary Beth Murphy in Republican primary election, and went on to defeat Kaplowitz in the general election.

=== Electoral history ===
Westchester County Legislator - District 4, 2007
| Party | Candidate | Votes | % | ±% |
|---|---|---|---|---|
| Democratic | Michael B. Kaplowitz (I) | 6834 | 57.8 | Democrat hold |
| Republican | Terrence P. Murphy | 4980 | 42.2 | |

New York State Senate, 40th District, 2006
| Party | Candidate | Votes | % | ±% |
|---|---|---|---|---|
| Democratic | Michael B. Kaplowitz | 43387 | 45.6 | |
| Republican | Vincent L. Leibell III (I) | 51724 | 54.4 | Republican hold |

Westchester County Legislator - District 4, 2005
| Party | Candidate | Votes | % | ±% |
|---|---|---|---|---|
| Democratic | Michael B. Kaplowitz (I) | 10069 | 66.1 | Democrat hold |
| Republican | Rand Neveloff | 5154 | 33.9 | |

Westchester County Legislator - District 4, 2003
| Party | Candidate | Votes | % | ±% |
|---|---|---|---|---|
| Democratic | Michael B. Kaplowitz (I) | 6662 | 54.4 | Democrat hold |
| Republican | Mark C. Fang | 5580 | 45.6 | |

Westchester County Legislator - District 4, 2001
| Party | Candidate | Votes | % | ±% |
|---|---|---|---|---|
| Democratic | Michael B. Kaplowitz (I) | 7460 | 57.1 | Democrat hold |
| Republican | Mark C. Fang | 5601 | 42.9 | |

Westchester County Legislator - District 4, 1999
| Party | Candidate | Votes | % | ±% |
|---|---|---|---|---|
| Democratic | Michael B. Kaplowitz (I) | 6148 | 52.3 | Democrat hold |
| Republican | RoseMarie Panio | 4954 | 42.1 | |

Westchester County Legislator - District 4, 1997
| Party | Candidate | Votes | % | ±% |
|---|---|---|---|---|
| Democratic | Michael B. Kaplowitz | 5341 | 50.1 | Democrat pickup |
| Republican | RoseMarie Panio | 5302 | 49.9 | |

== See also ==
- Westchester County, New York

== Notes ==
| Preceded by Andrew J. Donovan | Westchester County Legislator, 4th District; 1998- | Succeeded by Incumbent |
