= Thomas J. Abinanti =

American politician (born 1946)

Thomas Abinanti

Member of the New York State Assembly from the 92nd district
- In office January 1, 2011 – December 31, 2022
- Preceded by: Richard Brodsky
- Succeeded by: MaryJane Shimsky

Personal details
- Born: December 28, 1946 (age 79) New York City, New York, U.S.
- Party: Democratic
- Spouse: Janet Longo
- Children: 2
- Education: Fordham University (BA); New York University (JD)

Thomas J. Abinanti (born December 28, 1946) is an American politician, lawyer, and former member of the New York State Assembly from Greenburgh, New York. A member of the Democratic Party, Abinanti was elected to the State Assembly in 2010 to replace Assemblyman Richard Brodsky, and represented central Westchester County, New York.

== Early life and education ==
Born in Brooklyn, Abinanti graduated from Xaverian High School in 1964. He received a B.A. in political science from Fordham College in 1968 and a J.D. from New York University School of Law in 1972.

== Career ==
Abinanti moved to Westchester in 1975 and lived in Greenburgh until 2011 when he moved to Pleasantville. He was legislative counsel to a Congressman and staff counsel to the Speaker of the New York State Assembly and various Assembly committees. He served as a prosecuting attorney for the villages of Ardsley and Dobbs Ferry. Abinanti has taught continuing legal education courses for Pace Law School and courses in state and local government as an adjunct professor at Mercy College.

Abinanti served as Greenburgh Town Councilman twice (1980–1984 and 1990–1991). Abinanti was elected as Westchester County Legislator ten times. For almost twenty years (1992–2010), he represented the 12th District on the Westchester County Board of Legislators, which included the villages of Irvington, Dobbs Ferry, Hastings, Ardsley, and much of unincorporated Greenburgh, including East Irvington, Central Greenburgh, Hartsdale and Edgemont. On the County Board, he served as Majority Leader for three terms after the Democrats first assumed the majority on the Board for the first time in the history of the Westchester Legislature.

He is a practicing attorney with an office in Pleasantville.

== State Assembly ==
Abinanti was first elected as a member of the New York State Assembly in 2010 and has served six terms. He represented the 92nd District of the State Assembly which included the Towns of Greenburgh and Mount Pleasant, including the Villages of Ardsley, Elmsford, Dobbs Ferry, Hastings-on-Hudson, Irvington, Tarrytown, Pleasantville, and Sleepy Hollow, as well as parts of the Village of Briarcliff. He served as chair of the Assembly Committee on Libraries, the Assembly Committee on Investigations, the Assembly Committee on Banks and the Assembly Committee on People with Disabilities

In 1996 and 2000, Abinanti ran unsuccessfully for the 35th District of the New York State Senate against the incumbent Republican State Senator Nicholas A. Spano.

In 2022, Abinanti lost renomination to the Assembly in the Democratic primary to Westchester County Legislator MaryJane Shimsky, who was backed by the Working Families Party. He again lost in a 2024 rematch.

In 2026, Abinanti is running for Town Supervisor of Mount Pleasant.

=== 2020 Election Controversy ===
Three voters filed objections to the petition of Abinanti's opponent, Jennifer A. Williams. Out of many objections, the Westchester Board of Elections deemed one valid—that Williams used the term "New York State Assembly, District 92," to describe the office she was running for. The Board of Elections struck Williams from the ballot because of the objection.

Williams then brought the case to court claiming the description was sufficient to describe the office she was seeking. Judge Gretchen Walsh ruled in Williams' favor. Williams and Abinanti both appeared on the ballot in the June 2020 primary. Abinanti won the Primary and then won the General Election.

== Personal life ==
Abinanti is married to Janet Longo-Abinanti. They have two children. Abinanti is an attorney and advocate for people with disabilities

New York State Assembly
Preceded by Richard Brodsky	New York State Assembly, 92nd District; January 1, 2011 – December 31, 2022	Incumbent
