= 1986 New York gubernatorial election =

- November 4, 1986
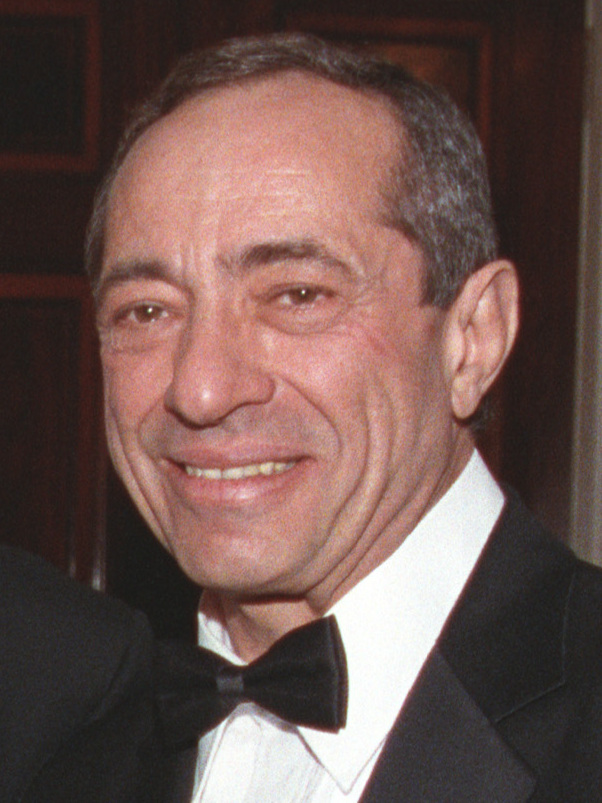

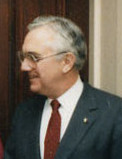
Nominee	Mario Cuomo	Andrew O'Rourke
Party	Democratic	Republican
Alliance	Liberal	Conservative
Running mate	Stan Lundine	E. Michael Kavanagh
Popular vote	2,775,045	1,363,968
Percentage	64.63%	31.77%
- County results Cuomo: 40–50% 50–60% 60–70% 70–80% 80–90% O'Rourke: 40–50% 50–60%
Governor before election
Mario Cuomo
Democratic
Elected Governor
Mario Cuomo
Democratic

The 1986 New York gubernatorial election was held on November 4, 1986, to elect the governor and lieutenant governor of New York. Democratic incumbent Mario Cuomo defeated Andrew O'Rourke, the Republican Westchester County Executive, in a landslide, carrying all but 5 counties. This is the last time that Alleghany, Orleans, and Wyoming counties voted Democratic in a gubernatorial election.

== Republican nomination ==
=== Candidates ===
- Andrew P. O'Rourke, Westchester County Executive

==== Declined ====
- James L. Emery, former Assembly minority leader and 1982 nominee for lieutenant governor
- Rudy Giuliani, U.S. attorney for the Southern District of New York
- Roy M. Goodman, state senator from Manhattan
- Henry Kissinger, former U.S. secretary of state
- Lewis Lehrman, investment banker and 1982 nominee for governor

Lewis Lehrman, the 1982 nominee, decided early on not to mount another candidacy Lehrman's decision was seen as a blow to state Republican leaders, given his strong performance in 1982 and fundraising capacity. Former secretary of state Henry Kissinger considered running and was deemed an "able" challenger, and his decision to ultimately decline also led to a leadership vacuum.

In the end, O'Rourke secured the Republican nomination, and was praised as an "extremely credible candidate" by White House official Bill Lacy. His running mate was E. Michael Kavanagh, who served as district attorney of Ulster County.

== General election ==
=== Candidates ===
- Mario Cuomo, incumbent governor since 1983 (Democratic, Liberal)
  - Running mate: Stan Lundine, U.S. representative from Jamestown
- Denis E. Dillon, Nassau County district attorney (Right to Life) (Note: Dillon held office as a member of the Democratic Party but defected to oppose Cuomo. He later joined the Republicans.)
  - Running mate: Thomas A. Droleskey, Hempstead political science professor and former seminarian
- Lenora Fulani, Brooklyn psychologist and 1982 nominee for lieutenant governor (New Alliance)
- Andrew P. O'Rourke, Westchester County Executive (Republican, Conservative)
  - Running mate: E. Michael Kavanagh, Ulster County district attorney

=== Results ===
1986 New York gubernatorial election
Party	Candidate	Votes	%	±%
Democratic	Mario Cuomo	2,654,754	61.83%	
Liberal	Mario Cuomo	120,291	2.80%	
Total	Mario Cuomo (incumbent)	2,775,045	64.63%	+13.72%
Republican	Andrew O'Rourke	1,211,662	28.22%	
Conservative	Andrew O'Rourke	152,306	3.55%	
Total	Andrew O'Rourke	1,363,968	31.77%	−15.71%
Right to Life	Denis E. Dillon	130,827	3.05%	+2.05%
New Alliance	Lenora Fulani	24,135	0.56%	+0.46%
Majority		1,411,077	32.86%	+29.43%
Turnout		4,293,975		
Democratic hold				
