= MaryJane Shimsky =

American politician

Member of the New York State Assembly from the 92nd district
- Incumbent
- Assumed office January 6, 2023
- Preceded by: Thomas Abinanti

Member of the Westchester County Board of Legislators from the 12th district
- In office February 2011 – December 31, 2022
- Preceded by: Thomas Abinanti
- Succeeded by: David Imamura

Personal details
- Born: February 13, 1960 (age 66) Scranton, Pennsylvania, U.S.
- Party: Democratic
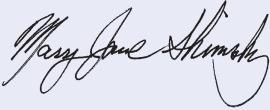
- Signature
- Website: Official website

MaryJane Shimsky is an American politician, and a Democratic member of the New York State Assembly for the 92nd district, which covers most of the Town of Greenburgh, the Town of Mount Pleasant, and part of northwest Yonkers. She was elected to the Assembly in November 2022, previously serving on the Westchester County Board of Legislators since February 2011.
