= RoseMarie Panio =

American politician (born 1941)

Secretary, New York State GOP
- In office 2006–2007
- Preceded by: Elizabeth Brilliant
- Succeeded by: Rebecca Marino

Personal details
- Born: 1941 (age 84–85) New York City, U.S.
- Spouse: Rocco Panio
- Children: 2
- Occupation: Liquor store owner
- Website: www.rosemariepanio.com

RoseMarie Panio (born 1941) is an American politician that ran the Westchester County, New York Republican Committee from 2004 to 2007. She was unanimously elected Secretary for the State GOP in 2006, but has been unsuccessful in three attempts at public office, including a 2007 race for Town supervisor of her home town. Panio owns a liquor store in Peekskill, New York, and is a grandmother. She resides in Yorktown Heights, New York.

== Political career and background ==
Panio was the first female Chairperson of the Westchester County Republican Committee. Panio's leadership was the subject of criticism as Westchester, one of the oldest Republican strongholds in the United States and home of former Governor George Pataki, began to trend heavily Democratic during her tenure. After her resignation, it was announced that the Westchester Republican Committee's bank account held a negative balance.

Prior to her election, she served as Vice-Chairperson for nine years. She also held the position of Chairperson of the Republican Committee for the Town of Yorktown for fourteen years. Before entering politics and owning a liquor store, Panio had worked in the advertising office of Look Magazine.

In 1997 she ran as a candidate for the Westchester County Board of Legislators, losing a close election to Democrat Michael Kaplowitz by only 39 votes. She lost a rematch in 1999 in another close election. She was elected as a delegate to the Republican National Convention in 1996 was an alternate delegate to the 2004 Republican National Convention in New York City.

Panio was appointed to the NYS Watershed Protection and Partnership Council by Governor George Pataki, served on the White House Committee on Small Business, and also as Chairperson for the 19th Congressional District's Senior Task Force. She is a member of the Yorktown Conservation Board and sits on the board of directors for Hudson Valley Hospital Center. Panio has received the Josh Hand Award in 1998, the Croton Watershed Clean Water Coalition Award in 2001, and was named one of New York State's Woman in Distinction in 2004 by the New York State Senate.

Panio is involved in many local civic activities, and is the Vice-President of the Peekskill, NY Chamber of Commerce, a member of the Yorktown Recycling Committee, Town Cleanup Committee, and Heart Fund Committee, President of the Lincoln Society, a member of the Ladies Auxiliary of the Christopher Columbus Society, the Circolo da Vinci organization, and founder of the Friends of the Croton Watershed. She is also fluent in Italian.

On June 11, 2007 Panio announced her resignation as Chairperson of the Westchester County Republican Committee in order to run for the position of Town Supervisor in Yorktown, New York. She was quickly endorsed by the Town Committee which she chairs. She was vying to replace Republican Linda Cooper, who opted not to seek reelection after twelve years in office. Panio's opponent was Yorktown Resident and business owner Don Peters, a former Republican who switched his party affiliation to Democrat in order to run for Town Supervisor in 2005, whom Cooper defeated by a comfortable yet slim margin. Independent Linda Clemenza, who was also an unsuccessful candidate for Supervisor in 2005, announced she would mount another write-in campaign in 2007. For the general election Panio was endorsed by the Journal News, but was still defeated easily by Peters, as he and other Democrats swept many traditionally Republican northern Westchester races.

"I think women have demonstrated in leadership positions that they're capable of handling very difficult situations," said Panio, who points to Secretary of State Condoleezza Rice as an example of a powerful woman on her side of the political spectrum. But, she cautioned, "for the presidency, I don't think it really matters if it's a man or a woman, it has to be the right person for the job.".

=== Electoral history ===
Town Supervisor - Town of Yorktown, 2007
Party	Candidate	Votes	%	±%
Democratic	Don Peters	4693	58%	Democrat pickup
Republican	RoseMarie Panio	3255	42%	
Write-In	Linda Clemenza	9	0%	

Westchester County Legislator - District 4, 1999
Party	Candidate	Votes	%	±%
Democratic	Michael B. Kaplowitz (I)	6148	52.3	Democrat hold
Republican	RoseMarie Panio	4954	42.1	

- Panio also ran on the Conservative Party of New York ticket.

Westchester County Legislator - District 4, 1997
Party	Candidate	Votes	%	±%
Democratic	Michael B. Kaplowitz	5341	50.1	Democrat pickup
Republican	RoseMarie Panio	5302	49.9	

== See also ==
- Westchester County, NY

== Notes ==
Preceded by Linda Cooper	Republican Candidate, Yorktown Town Supervisor; 2007	Succeeded by
Preceded by Elizabeth Brilliant	Secretary, New York State GOP; 2006-	Succeeded by Incumbent
Preceded by James Cavanaugh	Chairperson, Westchester County GOP; 2004-2007	Succeeded by Douglas Colety
Preceded by Nancy Elliott	Chairperson, Yorktown Republican Committee; 1993-	Succeeded by Incumbent
