= Denis E. Dillon =

American politician (1933–2010)

District Attorney of Nassau County
- In office January 1, 1975 – December 31, 2005
- Preceded by: William Cahn
- Succeeded by: Kathleen Rice

Personal details
- Born: December 21, 1933 The Bronx, New York City
- Died: August 15, 2010 (aged 76) Rockville Centre, New York
- Party: Republican (1988–2010); Democratic (1955–1988)
- Education: Fordham University

Denis E. Dillon (December 21, 1933 – August 15, 2010), was an American prosecutor and politician who served as District Attorney of Nassau County, New York, from 1975 to 2005. Dillon was well known for his opposition to abortion rights, and the issue prompted his defection to the Republican Party in 1989, having previously been one of the very few Democratic politicians to have success in Nassau County. Prior to his defection, Dillon challenged incumbent Democrat Mario Cuomo from the right in the 1986 New York gubernatorial election, finishing in third place with 3% of the vote as the nominee of the New York State Right to Life Party.

First elected to a three-year term as District Attorney in 1974, Dillon was re-elected to seven four-year terms, losing in his attempt to win a ninth term in 2005 to Democratic nominee Kathleen Rice. In the history of New York, only Robert Morgenthau of New York County (Manhattan) and William V. Grady of Dutchess County have served longer as a District Attorneys, although Robert M. Carney of Schenectady County will also surpass Dillon's mark prior to the expiration of his current term.

== Early life, education and career ==
Dillon was born in 1933 into a devout Roman Catholic family in the Bronx, and spent parts of his childhood living in the borough's Woodlawn Heights neighborhood, where his father owned a bar, as well as the Rockaway Beach section of Queens and in Arlington, Virginia, an immediate suburb of the District of Columbia. Dillon graduated from Fordham University with a bachelor's degree in 1955.

Dillon graduated from Fordham University School of Law in 1962, having attended at night while working as an officer in the New York Police Department. Upon graduation, Dillon was hired by the United States Department of Justice Civil Rights Division, where he served until appointed an Assistant United States Attorney for the Eastern District of New York in 1966. In 1968, Dillon joined the Eastern District's Organized Crime Task Force, becoming its director in April 1970 and serving until he resigned to run for District Attorney on May 16, 1974.

== District Attorney ==
=== 1974 election ===
Dillon was originally elected in 1974 as a Democrat, defeating 12-year incumbent Republican William Cahn and Conservative Party nominee Francis B. Hearn with 52% of the vote in what The New York Times called a "major upset".

The campaign between Dillon and Cahn was brutal from the onset, and took place amidst the backdrop of the January 10, 1974, revelation that Cahn was under investigation by the office of the United States Attorney for the Eastern District of New York, where Dillon served as Organized Crime Task Force chief, for alleged grand jury tampering in relation to the revocation of indictments against three Republican Oyster Bay municipal officials involved with parking meter kickbacks. The investigation was opened in August 1973, when Dillon was approached with the allegations by Norman E. Blankman, an independent candidate for County Executive on the Integrity line, but the matter was quickly reassigned to another assistant by US Attorney Robert A. Morse because it lacked a nexus to organized crime.

The investigation proceeded privately, but was upended on December 4 when Morse committed suicide by jumping from his fifth story apartment. Morse's death left the US Attorney's office vacant, pending the recommendation of a new appointee to President Richard Nixon from New York's two Republican senators, Jacob Javits and James L. Buckley. Much influence in filling the vacancy was expected to be held by Nassau County Republican chairman Joseph Margiotta, who as the boss of Nassau County's political machine became one of the foremost Republican power brokers statewide. Prior to Christmas, Margiotta approached Cahn's Chief Assistant District Attorney, Edward Margolin offering a recommendation for the vacancy, which was accepted. Margiotta proceeded to contact state Republican chairman Richard Rosenbaum, recommending Margolin for appointment; Rosenbaum then forwarded the recommendation, with his own endorsement, to Javits and Buckley. Concurrent to these events, Dillon had begun to himself seek the appointment, contacting Buckley to recommend himself for the position, and receiving the unsolicited recommendation of United States Assistant Attorney General for the Criminal Division Henry E. Petersen.

When word of Margiotta's recommendation that Margolin fill the vacancy reached assistants in the US Attorney's office, they contacted Department of Justice officials in Washington to express their concern that he could interfere with the investigation of Cahn. Margolin was soon dropped from consideration upon the disclosure that he had been subpoenaed to appear before the federal grand jury investigating Cahn, with the appointment instead going in late March to David G. Trager, a professor at Brooklyn Law School.

Dillon first suggested that he was considering a campaign on May 14, the same day Trager was confirmed by the Senate to serve as US Attorney, and announced his candidacy on May 16, resigning from the US Attorney's office to do so. Dillon's candidacy was responded to favorably by party leadership, with Stanley Harwood, the Assemblyman and county chair, saying that Dillon's chances were "very good" and that his "extensive experience" in criminal prosecution would "bring a dimension into the campaign we haven't had before". Dillon's candidacy was endorsed by the county Democratic committee on the first ballot in a June meeting, despite concerns from some that his status as a recent transplant to Rockville Centre from New York City made him a carpetbagger.

During the campaign, Dillon attacked Cahn for a poor record of cooperation with federal authorities in his capacity as District Attorney, saying that "not once" during Dillon's time as the Eastern District's organized crime chief had Cahn's office shared information with the Federal Bureau of Investigation, and that it had "seriously weakened federal law enforcement efforts" in the county. Dillon also attacked Cahn for having a lackluster conviction rate, saying that from 1970 to 1973, Nassau County had the highest rate of acquittals and cases dismissed prior to trial compared to Rockland, Suffolk, and Westchester Counties, while having the lowest conviction rate, something Dillon compared to "leading the league in errors, strikeouts, and men left on base". Cahn responded by accusing Dillon's campaign of cherry picking counties with a low case load for comparison, pointing out that many of the pre-trial dismissals were due to a diversion program not available in the other counties, and criticizing Dillon for being interested in "box score justice".

Dillon further attacked Cahn for politicizing the office by submitting his proposed appointees for Assistant District Attorney positions for approval from the county's Republican Party, which resulted in 99 of the office's 100 attorneys being registered Republicans.

Despite Cahn's weaknesses and having run a strong campaign, Dillon was outspent by a $300,000 to $30,000 margin and was not expected to win on election day. Dillon's victory was assisted by the unexpectedly strong coattails of successful Democratic gubernatorial nominee Hugh Carey, who won an upset victory in the county against the prediction of county Republican polling, and the general bad climate for Republicans in the aftermath of the Watergate scandal.

=== 1977 election ===
Dillon was unanimously re-nominated for District Attorney by the Nassau County Democratic Committee, later receiving the Liberal and Conservative Party endorsements as well. Dillon was also under consideration for the Republican line, but was urged to decline a cross endorsement by Democratic leaders who feared it would help Republican candidates downballot.

Republicans nominated Hempstead Town Councilman Gregory P. Peterson, the only individual actively campaigning, to face Dillon in the general election. Dillon was favored throughout the race, but Peterson went on the offensive, criticizing Dillon for his personal opposition to capital punishment, and what he felt was soft enforcement on marijuana and organized crime. Dillon countered by declaring that he would put aside his personal view and enforce any new capital punishment statute should the legislature implement it, and cited his work at the Department of Justice against the Colombo crime family in response to Peterson's claims on organized crime prosecutions.

Dillon was ultimately re-elected with 62% of the vote on the Democratic, Conservative, and Liberal Party lines over Peterson, who had only the Republican line Dillon's re-election was one of the few bright spots for Nassau County Democrats, who saw Republicans retain both the County Executive and Comptroller's seats, as well as an overwhelming majority on the county's Board of Supervisors.

=== 1981 election ===
The 1980 indictment of Margiotta led to speculation that Dillon, at the height of his popularity, would seek the Democratic nomination for County Executive against incumbent Francis Purcell, a Margiotta associate. Dillon ultimately declined the opportunity, instead accepting an offer brokered by his friend, then-Hempstead Town Councilman Peter King, of the Republican endorsement and ballot line for re-election as District Attorney. King, with whom Dillon had bonded over their opposition to abortion and support of Irish republicanism, obtained Margiotta's approval for the deal and Dillon received the Republican nomination without opposition. In the aftermath of Dillon's decision, Democrats largely abandoned their countywide effort for the November election, running their county vice chairman John Matthews as a sacrificial lamb against Purcell. This sequence of events led to the Democrats planned nominee for Comptroller, Richard Kessel, dropping out of the race, saying that the electorate would "vote for Purcell on the Republican line, Dillon on the G.O.P. line and then clickety-clack right down the Republican line".

In November, Dillon was elected unopposed to a third term, having received the Democratic, Republican, Liberal, and Conservative nominations, as well as that of the Right to Life Party, which first attained statewide ballot access after the 1978 gubernatorial election. Dillon's unopposed re-election came amidst a Republican landslide countywide, with the party winning every contested race, including King's as County Comptroller.

=== 1985 election ===
In advance of the 1985 cycle it was speculated that Dillon would again face a Republican challenger, with new county chair Joseph Mondello having approached several state legislators about a candidacy, knowing they would not have to risk their seats in an odd-numbered year, but these attempts were ultimately unsuccessful and Dillon was cross-endorsed for the second time.

Dillon also obtained the re-nomination of four additional parties (Democratic, Liberal, Conservative, Right to Life) and was officially unopposed for re-election, but opposition arose just days after the primary when, on September 14, Dillon led a march of 1,000 individuals, primarily drawn from regional Catholic churches and schools, at the Bill Baird Center, a Hempstead abortion clinic. Dillon's actions led to his candidacy being disavowed by the Liberal Party and its Nassau County Chair, Jack Olchin, and to the decision of Bill Baird, the clinic's namesake and a well known reproductive rights activist, to mount a write-in campaign against Dillon. Dillon publicly welcomed Baird's challenge, but used his lack of a law license to criticize his supporters, saying "it will be interesting to see how many pro-choice people will vote for a non-lawyer for D.A." Baird's challenge, as well as an appeal from the Nassau chapter of the National Organization for Women for voters to write-in Jane Roe, combined to just 1% of the total votes cast, but the size of Dillon's undervote also increased by 67,000 from 1981, when he also ran unopposed with all five ballot lines.

Despite facing no opposition for re-nomination to the Democratic ticket, Dillon's relationship with the party appeared increasingly strained through the election. In the immediate aftermath of Dillon's march on the Baird Center, the Nassau County Democratic Committee adopted a resolution in support of the right to choose which said that this right should be "secured to the fullest by all law enforcement agencies." Dillon responded to this rebuke by saying that the Democratic position "smacks of religious fanaticism when describing a woman's right to kill the unborn baby within her as God-given." Once considered a possible Democratic candidate for statewide office, Dillon near the end of the campaign told Newsday about a lunch he had had a few years earlier with Stanley Harwood, then the Nassau County Democratic chairman, at which Harwood laughed at the idea of Dillon seeking the party's nomination for a seat in the United States Senate.

== 1986 gubernatorial campaign ==
In May 1986, Dillon was nominated for Governor of New York by the New York State Right to Life Party on a ticket with Thomas Droleskey, an assistant professor at St. Francis College, for Lieutenant Governor, and Mary Jane Tobin, the party's founder, for Comptroller. The party cross-endorsed the better known Republicans Peter King and Alfonse D'Amato in the races for Attorney General and Senate.

Dillon accepted the nomination the third time it was offered to him by the party's leadership, and only after it had been declined by Republican nominee Andrew O'Rourke, who had eschewed the party throughout his career, considering it detriment despite sharing many of its ideals. Dillon's candidacy was considered a boon for the party, which had struggled to reach the 50,000 votes required to maintain official party status in the 1982 gubernatorial election, slipping from the fourth to the fifth ballot line.

During the campaign, Dillon described himself as a "progressive Democrat" except for his staunch opposition to abortion and gay rights. Dillon also said that while he remained generally opposed to the death penalty, he would sign a bill reinstating the death penalty since the legislature had so far failed to pass legislation establishing a sentence of life without parole.

Dillon's campaign further deteriorated his relationship with Democratic leadership, which had objected to him running, with Nassau County Democratic Chair Martin Mellman saying in June that Dillon had effectively abandoned the party. In September, Dillon openly acknowledged his vulnerability in future Democratic primaries and mused that he could eventually defect to the Republican party.

Dillon ultimately received 130,802 votes (3.05%), which returned the Right to Life Party to fourth place on the New York ballot and maintained its official party status for four years.

== Death ==
On August 15, 2010, Dillon, a devoted Catholic, died at his home in Rockville Centre after a long battle with lymphoma. He was 76 years old.
