= 2017 New York Proposition 1 =

2017 New York State Constitutional Convention referendum
- November 7, 2017

Results
Choice	Votes	%
Yes	544,889	16.77%
No	2,704,143	83.23%
Total votes	3,249,032	100.00%
No
90–100%
80–90%
70–80%

New York Proposition 1 was a 2017 ballot measure that would have established a constitutional convention to revise the Constitution of the State of New York, subject to the approval of the voters. Section 2 of Article XIX of the state constitution requires that every 20 years the ballot question "Shall there be a convention to revise the constitution and amend the same?" should be submitted to the voters. The referendum was rejected by a large margin on November 7, 2017.

- A "yes" vote supported holding a constitutional convention to develop and propose changes to the state constitution that voters would vote on at the election on November 5, 2019.
- A "no" vote opposed holding a constitutional convention to develop and propose changes to the state constitution that voters would vote on at the election on November 5, 2019.
- A blank or invalid vote was not counted either way.

== Election process ==
The ballot question is the first step in the process of calling a constitutional convention in New York. If a majority of voters cast their ballots in favor of holding a convention, voters would elect 204 convention delegates on November 6, 2018. Fifteen of the delegates would be elected statewide. Three would be elected from each of the state's 63 senate districts. The convention would convene on April 2, 2019, in Albany. Delegates would be allowed to draft a new constitution or amendments to the existing constitution. Referring a constitution or amendment to the ballot would require a simple majority vote of the delegates. The people of New York would vote on the convention-proposed changes to the constitution on November 5, 2019.

The ballot question is as follows:

The New York State Constitution requires that every 20 years the people decide if a Constitutional Convention should be held to consider amendments to the State Constitution. The purpose of this Ballot Question is to allow the voters of New York State to determine whether a Constitutional Convention will be held in 2019.

If a majority voting on this Question votes NO, there will be no Constitutional Convention.

If a majority votes YES, three delegates from each state senatorial district and 15 at-large statewide delegates will be elected in November 2018. The delegates will convene at the Capitol in April 2019. Amendments adopted by a majority of the delegates will be submitted to the voters for approval or rejection in a statewide referendum to be held at least six weeks after the Convention adjourns. The delegates will determine whether to submit proposed amendments as separate questions. Any amendments that the voters approve will go into effect on the January 1 following their approval.

If a majority votes in favor of a Constitutional Convention, then the delegates will receive for their services the same compensation as that payable to Members of the Assembly. The delegates also will be reimbursed for actual traveling expenses while the Convention is in session, to the extent that Members of the Assembly would be entitled reimbursement during a session of the Legislature.

The delegates will have the power to appoint the officers, employees, and assistants that they deem necessary and to fix the compensation of those officers, employees, and assistants. The delegates also will have the power to provide for the expenses of the Convention, including the printing of its documents, journal, and proceedings. The delegates will determine the rules of their proceedings, choose their officers, and be the judge of the election, returns, and qualifications of their members. A vacancy in an office of district delegate will be filled by a vote of the remaining delegates representing the district in which the vacancy occurs; a vacancy in the office of a delegate-at-large will be filled by a vote of the remaining delegates-at-large.

== Supporters ==
There were three political action committees, the Committee for a Constitutional Convention, NY People's Convention PAC, and Restrict & Regulate in NY State 2019, registered in support of the constitutional convention question. The committees reported $389,474 in contributions and $361,039 in expenditures.

The top contributor in support of the question was Democratic fundraiser Bill Samuels, who contributed $100,725 in cash and $61,772 in in-kind services. Compared to the opposition, the supporters of the proposition were disorganized and underfunded.

=== Notable supporters ===
- Bill Samuels, businessman
- Evan Davis, former president of the New York City Bar Association
- Brian Kolb, Minority Leader of the New York State Assembly
- Richard Brodsky, former member of the New York State Assembly
- Carl Paladino, 2010 gubernatorial candidate and former Buffalo Public Schools Board of Education member; initially supported, then opposed, then announced support on day before election

== Opponents ==
There were two committees, New Yorkers Against Corruption and Say No to a Constitutional Convention (SNCC), registered in opposition to the constitutional convention question. The committees reported $635,300 in contributions and $311,810 in expenditures in the last filing period before the election; an additional $1,000,000 was raised and $2,200,000 spent in the period between then and Election Day, which was not publicly reported until a month after the election.

The top contributor in opposition to the question was the New York State United Teachers, who donated $444,000, all after the last filing period. SEIU 1199 came in second with a $250,000 donation. On the whole, the opponents of the proposition grossly outspent the supporters and, with labor union backing, rallied public employees to their cause, giving the no vote a massive base in even conservative small towns where government is often the largest and most lucrative employer. This led to consistent and widespread no votes throughout the state and across all demographics.

=== Criticism of the opposition ===
The opposition coalition was criticized for spreading false rumors and misinformation about the convention, namely a rumor that blank votes would be counted as yes, another stating that a convention could take away public employees' pensions (which is prohibited under the U.S. Constitution), a grossly inflated estimate of the cost (New Yorkers Against Corruption claimed a price tag in the hundreds of millions, when most realistic estimates placed the cost at $50,000,000), and implying that Albany insiders had orchestrated the convention vote (it has been a scheduled part of the state Constitution since the 19th century, and almost all notable political forces in the state in fact opposed the convention) and would control and corrupt the delegate selection process (delegates are elected, and fewer than 10% of the delegates to the most recent convention in 1967 were incumbent Albany politicians).

=== Notable opponents ===
- Bill de Blasio, Mayor of New York City
- Andrew Cuomo, Governor of New York. Initially implied support, then stated he would vote against the referendum the day before it was scheduled
- John Flanagan, Majority Leader of the New York State Senate
- Carl Heastie, Speaker of the New York State Assembly
- Jeff Klein, New York State Senator and Leader of the Independent Democratic Conference
- Edward Cox, Chairman of the New York State Republican Committee
- John DeFrancisco, New York State Senator and Deputy Majority Leader

== Polling ==
Poll source	Date(s) administered	Sample size	Margin of error	Yes ✓	No ✗	Undecided	Spread
Siena College	October 25–29, 2017	814	± 3.4%	25%	57%	18%	No +32
Baruch College	October 2–13, 2017	801	± 2.9%	32%	27%	41%	Yes +5
Siena College	September 25–28, 2017	789	± 4.2%	44%	39%	17%	Yes +5
Siena College	August 26–30, 2017	771	± 4.2%	45%	33%	22%	Yes +12
Siena College	July 9–13, 2017	793	± 4.2%	47%	34%	19%	Yes +13
Quinnipiac University	July 5–10, 2017	1,137	± 3.7%	55%	30%	15%	Yes +25
Siena College	May 15–21, 2017	770	± 4.0%	62%	22%	16%	Yes +40
Siena College	February 19–23, 2017	723	± 4.3%	63%	24%	13%	Yes +39
Siena College	June 22–28, 2016	803	± 3.8%	68%	15%	17%	Yes +53
Siena College	July 6–9, 2015	803	± 3.8%	69%	15%	16%	Yes +54

== Results ==
2017 New York Proposition 1
Choice	Votes	%
For	544,889	16.77
Against	2,704,143	83.23
Total	3,249,032	100.00
Total votes	3,249,032	–
