= Richard Brodsky =

American lawyer and politician (1946–2020)

Member of the New York State Assembly from the 86th, 92nd district
- In office 1983–2010
- Preceded by: Vincent A. Marchiselli
- Succeeded by: Thomas J. Abinanti

Personal details
- Born: Richard Louis Brodsky; May 4, 1946 Brooklyn, New York, U.S.
- Died: April 8, 2020 (aged 73) Greenburgh, New York, U.S.
- Spouse: Paige Massman Brodsky
- Children: 2
- Education: Brandeis University (BA); Harvard University (JD)

Richard Louis Brodsky (May 4, 1946 – April 8, 2020) was an American lawyer and politician from New York. Brodsky served in the New York Assembly from 1983 until 2010.

== Early life and education ==
Brodsky was born on May 4, 1946, in Brooklyn, New York City. In 1955, the family moved to Westchester County. He attended Ardsley High School. He earned a Bachelor of Arts degree in Politics from Brandeis University and Juris Doctor from Harvard Law School.

== Career ==
A Democrat, Brodsky was a member of the New York State Assembly from 1983 to 2010, sitting in the 185th, 186th, 187th, 188th, 189th, 190th, 191st, 192nd, 193rd, 194th, 195th, 196th, 197th and 198th New York State Legislatures. He was first elected to public office in 1975, winning a seat in the Westchester County Board of Legislators.

In 2006, Brodsky announced his intentions of running for Attorney General of New York, a campaign that he suspended in order to donate a kidney to his 14-year-old daughter. He did not ultimately donate, but later introduced legislation that would make consent to organ donation presumptive for New York state residents. After the resignation of New York State Comptroller Alan Hevesi, Brodsky was a frontrunner to succeed the scandal-ridden Hevesi. Thomas DiNapoli was selected instead by the Legislature to serve out the rest of Hevesi's term. Brodsky later ran to succeed Attorney General Andrew Cuomo in the 2010 elections, but lost to Eric Schneiderman in the primary.

Brodsky wrote a weekly column for the Albany Times Union up until days before his death. He served on the Board of Advisors of the Global Panel Foundation. In 2010, Brodsky became a Senior Fellow at the Robert F. Wagner Graduate School of Public Service at New York University. Additionally, in April 2011, Brodsky joined non-partisan public policy organization Demos as Senior Fellow. He wrote regularly for Demos' "Policy Shop" weblog and is a columnist for The Capitol.

Brodsky worked as a lawyer for the Working Families Party for years, notably winning a "landmark case stemming out of the 2004 Albany County district attorney contest that let the WFP spend money in Democratic primary races, paving the way for the WFP’s future involvement in campaigns like the one run by Cynthia Nixon in the 2018 gubernatorial campaign." On the day that Governor Andrew Cuomo began to put New York on lockdown in response to the COVID-19 crisis, Brodsky won "a WFP challenge against rules created by the Public Financing Commission that threatened to destroy the state’s minor parties."

== Political positions and legislation ==
=== Oversight of public authorities ===
Brodsky sponsored the Public Authorities Reform Act, which was signed into law in December 2009.

As Chair of the Assembly Committee on Corporations, Authorities and Commissions, Brodsky investigated New York's system of public authorities, including the Metropolitan Transportation Authority, the New York State Thruway Authority, the Long Island Power Authority and the Olympic Regional Development Authority. Brodsky sponsored the Public Authorities Accountability Act of 2005.

=== Nuclear power ===
During his career, Brodsky, was concerned with the potential safety hazards of nuclear power plants located at Indian Point Energy Center. He released the Interim Report on the Evacuation Plans for the Indian Point Nuclear Generating Facility in February 2002, highlighting the perceived failures of Entergy and state authorities to develop a feasible evacuation plan in a theoretical core meltdown, terrorist attack, or other catastrophic emergency. Three months later he co-signed a petition to FEMA requesting that it deny continued approval to the Indian Point Evacuation Plans. In January 2010, he filed suit against the Nuclear Regulatory Commission "challenging its decision to allow Entergy Inc., which operates the nuclear facilities at Indian Point in Buchanan, New York, to violate fire safety standards."

In May 2011, Brodsky sent a letter to the NRC formally complaining of commissions' violations of the Freedom Of Information Act (FOIA) law with respect to his FOI request earlier that year. The request had sought a complete listing of all "exemptions" to health and safety rules, including fire safety, at nuclear power plants across America. The "exemptions" in question included issues of fire safety, control of safety systems that are required for safe shutdown in cases where core meltdown is possible, safe evacuation of civilian populations and safe storage of spent fuel.

=== Environment ===
When Brodsky was Chairman of the Committee on Environmental Conservation (1993–2002), he authored the legislation responsible for creating the Environmental Protection Fund, devoted to environmental protection and preservation in New York State. Brodsky is also partially responsible for having authored the Clean Air/Clean Water Bond Act, a $1.75 billion bond act approved by New York state voters in 1996. In 2007, Brodsky introduced legislation which subsequently passed to phase out the use of pesticides on State property.

=== Constitutional Convention ===
Brodsky sponsored legislation permitting New Yorkers to vote on whether a Constitutional Convention should be held in New York State in 2010. He publicly recommended that those calling for a Convention must realize that they "have an obligation to tell us what the Constitution would look like when they are finished with it."

Brodsky was one of the few prominent political figures to support a "yes" vote on the automatic constitutional convention referendum of 2017, which was defeated.

=== Taxes ===
Brodsky was involved in the creation of the New York State School Tax Relief Program (STAR), which was enacted into law in 1996. He also co-sponsored legislation to eliminate the state tax on clothing.

=== Telecommunications ===
Brodsky worked to reform New York's telecommunications and energy systems. In 2007 he authored the Omnibus Telecommunications Reform Act that would create a broadband authority, expand universal service, protect the traditional telephone system, create cable competition and protect net neutrality. He led an effort to make the Internet safer, authoring several Internet security bills, including the anti-phishing act of 2006, the computer breaking and entering act, a bill to notify consumers of the limitations of 911 emergency services using Internet phones and the country's first-of-its-kind act to combat modem hijacking.

Brodsky co-authored a Demos paper in opposition to NJ Senate Bill 2664, or the "Market Competition and Consumer Choice Act," entitled "How To Raise The Phone Bill On The Average New Jersey Family."

=== Metropolitan Transportation Authority ===
As Chairman of the Committee on Corporations, Authorities and Commissions, Brodsky was involved in the 2009/2010 financial issues facing the MTA. He held hearings to investigate the authority as well as seeking to retain funding for New York City student MetroCards. As Chairman of the Committee on Corporations, Authorities and Commissions, Brodsky sought greater oversight and funding for the authority.

=== Congestion pricing ===
In July 2007, Brodsky became a leading opponent of New York City Mayor Michael Bloomberg's congestion pricing proposal. Brodsky issued a negative report about the proposal. According to the New York State Board of Elections, Brodsky received more campaign contributions from New York City's parking garage industry than any other state legislator. The proposal, which would have substantially reduced New York City motor vehicle traffic congestion and provided funding to mass transit, failed.

== Death ==
Brodsky died on April 8, 2020, in Greenburgh, New York, of a heart attack, aged 73. He also suffered symptoms consistent with COVID-19.

New York State Assembly
| Preceded by Vincent A. Marchiselli | New York State Assembly; 86th District; 1983–2002 | Succeeded by Luis Diaz |
| Preceded by Alexander J. Gromack | New York State Assembly; 92nd District; 2003–2010 | Succeeded by Thomas J. Abinanti |
