= George Latimer (New York politician) =

American politician (born 1953)

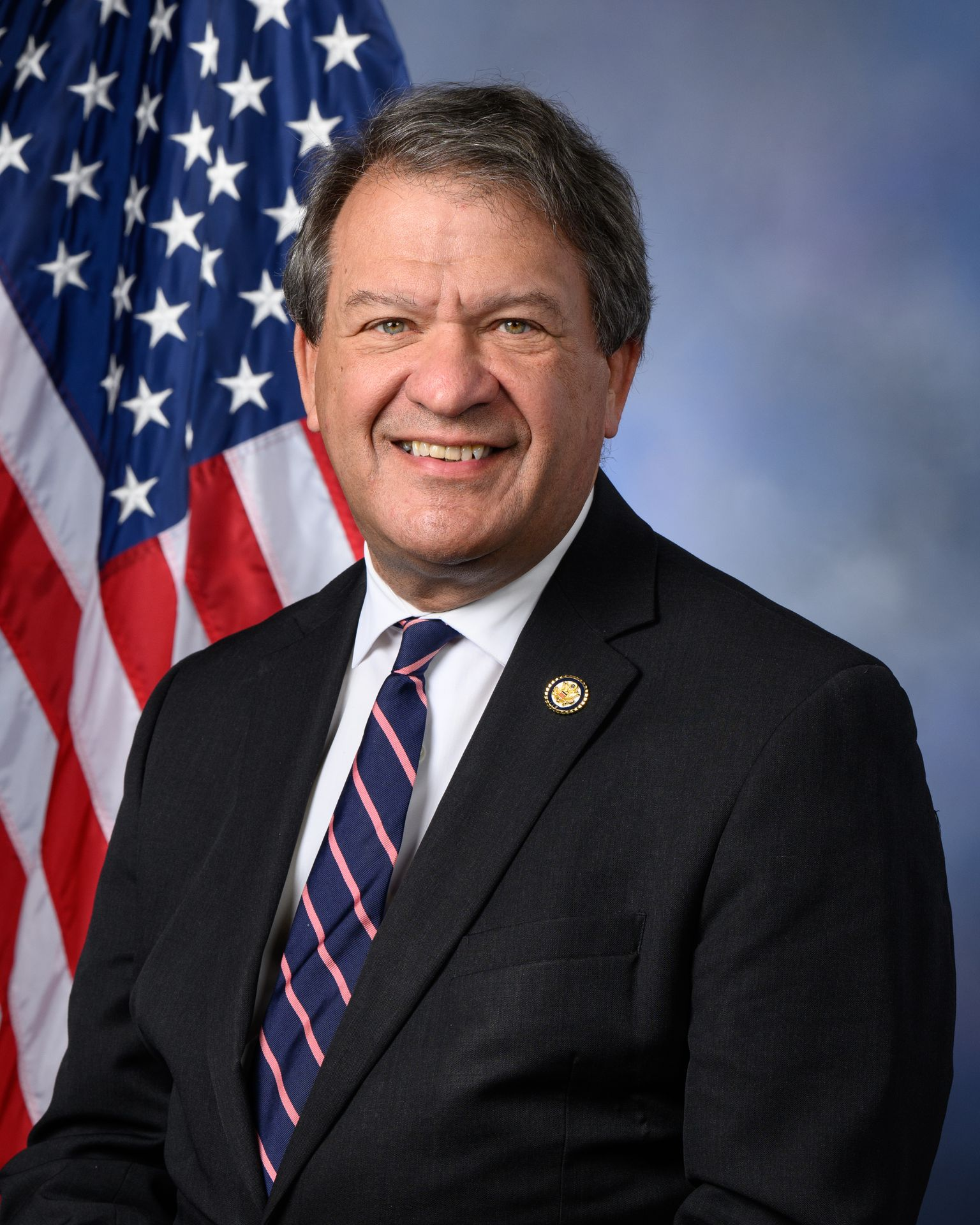
- Official portrait, 2025

Member of the U.S. House of Representatives from New York's 16th district
- Incumbent
- Assumed office January 3, 2025
- Preceded by: Jamaal Bowman

9th Westchester County Executive
- In office January 1, 2018 – January 2, 2025
- Deputy: Ken Jenkins
- Preceded by: Rob Astorino
- Succeeded by: Ken Jenkins

Member of the New York State Senate from the 37th district
- In office January 1, 2013 – December 31, 2017
- Preceded by: Suzi Oppenheimer
- Succeeded by: Shelley Mayer

Member of the New York State Assembly from the 91st district
- In office January 1, 2005 – December 31, 2012
- Preceded by: Ronald Tocci
- Succeeded by: Steven Otis

Member of the Westchester County Board of Legislators from the 7th district
- In office January 1, 1992 – December 31, 2004
- Preceded by: Diane Keane
- Succeeded by: Judy Myers

Personal details
- Born: George Stephen Latimer; November 22, 1953 (age 72) Mount Vernon, New York, U.S.
- Party: Democratic
- Spouse: Robin Phelps Latimer
- Children: 1
- Education: Fordham University (BA); New York University (MPA)
- Website: House website Campaign website

George Stephen Latimer (born November 22, 1953) is an American politician serving as the U.S. representative for New York's 16th congressional district since 2025. He is a member of the Democratic Party.

Previously, Latimer served on the Rye City Council and the Westchester County Board of Legislators. He was a member of the New York State Assembly from 2005 to 2012 and of the New York State Senate from 2013 to 2017. Latimer was elected Westchester County Executive in 2017, defeating incumbent Republican Rob Astorino, and was re-elected in 2021.

In 2024, Latimer was elected to the House of Representatives after defeating incumbent Jamaal Bowman in the Democratic primary in what was, at the time, the most expensive congressional primary in American history until 2026.

== Early life, education, and early career ==
Latimer was born in Mount Vernon, New York, on November 22, 1953, to Stanley and Loretta (née Miner) Latimer. He attended and graduated from Mount Vernon High School in 1970. He commuted to Fordham University in the Bronx and graduated with a B.A. in 1974. He asked his father for a loan to help him obtain his Master of Public Administration from New York University's Wagner School. While earning his graduate degree, he worked part-time as a budget analyst at Fordham. After graduating in 1976, he took the position of housing coordinator, setting up Section 8 housing in Mount Vernon. “I discovered an affinity for government work, and I paid my father back,” he said.

Latimer later worked for two decades as a marketing executive in the hospitality industry for major organizations, including subsidiaries of Nestlé and ITT.

== Early political career ==
Latimer first ran for public office in 1987. He won a seat on the Rye City Council, finishing first in a field of six major party candidates. Latimer was elevated in 1991 to the Westchester County Board of Legislators, becoming the first-ever Democrat to win the 7th District seat representing the city of Rye, the village of Larchmont, and the town and village of Mamaroneck. He was re-elected in 1993, 1995, and 1997; in January 1998, Democrats won a majority of seats on the county board for the first time in 90 years. Latimer was elected to chair the board, becoming the first Democrat ever elected to that post. He was re-elected to his legislative seat in 1999 and served a second term as chairman from 2000 to 2001.

Latimer did not seek a third term as chair in 2002, having been re-elected to a sixth term in the Westchester County Legislature. Westchester County Democrats elected him county Democratic Party chairman in September 2002, and he served in that capacity for a two-year term.

=== New York State Assembly ===
After winning re-election to the County Legislature in 2003, Latimer sought and won a seat in the New York State Assembly in 2004. He served in the Assembly from 2005 to 2012. In the Assembly, Latimer represented the 91st District, which included the Sound Shore communities of New Rochelle, Rye Brook, and Port Chester alongside the communities of his county legislative district.

=== New York State Senate ===
In 2012, Latimer ran for the New York State Senate in the 37th District against Republican Bob Cohen following the retirement announcement of Senator Suzi Oppenheimer (D). Following his election in 2012, Latimer served in the State Senate from 2013 to 2017.

Latimer missed a state budget vote in 2017 while on a trip to London.

=== Westchester County Executive ===
In 2017, Latimer challenged Republican incumbent Rob Astorino for Westchester County Executive.

During the campaign, Astorino attacked Latimer because a house belonging to his late mother-in-law was delinquent on $46,000 in property taxes. Latimer said that the taxes would be paid as soon as the estate was settled, and that he was not responsible for the taxes as he did not own the house. An investigation by News 12 showed that Latimer's name did not appear on the deed to the house.

Latimer was also criticized for having "a car-registration suspension on his record," and for missing state budget votes in April 2017 while vacationing in the [United Kingdom] with a woman other than his wife." Astorino called for Latimer to "step down from the state Senate’s Education Committee because he missed the state budget vote..." In October 2017, the New York Post reported that Latimer had "told fellow Democrats he was attending the [United Kingdom] trip with his wife, Robin... The state budget was passed a week after the April 1 deadline this year, and Latimer missed the votes on legislation approving school funding, tax revenues and the capital budget." Latimer accused Astorino of "trying to divert voters’ attention — but didn’t deny taking the trip"; when asked where he was during the skipped votes, Latimer told reporters that the subject was "not [their] business."

The Latimer campaign, in turn, accused Astorino of receiving a sweetheart deal on a Rolex watch due to his relationship with a businessman who had pleaded guilty to fraud charges; Latimer's campaign called for Astorino's resignation based on the allegations.

Latimer defeated Astorino by 14 points despite being outspent over 3-to-1 by Astorino's campaign.

On November 2, 2021, Latimer was re-elected to a second term as county executive.

As Westchester County Executive, Latimer "banned gun shows on public property, outlawed gay conversion therapy, expanded the role of the county’s human rights division and signed the Immigration Protection Act that limits the county’s cooperation with federal investigations of undocumented workers". He also increased property taxes by two percent, supported a one percent sales tax increase, and implemented a ban on questions about applicants' criminal backgrounds on job applications. In 2023, under Latimer's leadership, Westchester County accepted some asylum seekers who came to the county from New York City.

== U.S. House of Representatives ==
=== Elections ===
==== 2024 ====
2024 Democratic primary results by precinct: Latimer: 50–60%; 60–70%; 70–80%; 80–90%; 90–100%; Bowman: 50–60%; 60–70%; 70–80%; 80–90%; 90–100%; Tie No votes

In December 2023, Latimer announced that he would run for the United States House of Representatives in 2024. He challenged incumbent U.S. Representative Jamaal Bowman in the June 25 Democratic primary in New York's 16th congressional district. Latimer ran as a pro-Israel Democrat, while Bowman was accused of antisemitism because he was critical of U.S. support for Israel in the Gaza war. The New York Times described the contest as "a marquee showcase of the party's divisions over the Israel-Hamas war."

The primary was the most expensive House primary in U.S. history, with $15 million in outside spending benefiting Latimer's campaign. Latimer received high-profile endorsements from former Secretary of State and former U.S. Senator Hillary Clinton, a resident of Chappaqua in Westchester County; from former U.S. representatives Eliot Engel and Nita Lowey; and from most area state legislators.

Latimer defeated Bowman, 58.6% to 41.4%. Bowman's loss was seen as a major defeat for the progressive wing of the party against its more moderate wing, represented by Latimer.

Latimer went on to win the general election, defeating Republican Miriam Flisser. As of December 2024, he had never lost an election.

==== 2026 ====
Latimer announced he would stand for reelection on April 12, 2026 submitting nearly 10,000 signatures. Since he was unopposed, this effectively secured his place as the Democratic nominee in the general election following the June 23 Democratic primary. He defeated Joseph Cinquemani, the republican candidate, in the general election.

=== Tenure ===
Latimer was sworn in to the 119th United States Congress on January 3, 2025.

As one of his first votes, Latimer joined 44 other Democrats and 198 Republicans to pass the Illegitimate Court Counteraction Act. The act would impose sanctions on International Criminal Court (ICC) officials who attempt to investigate, arrest, detain, or prosecute any protected person of the U.S. or its allies, in response to the ICC issuing warrants for Israeli officials.

In March 2026, Latimer introduced the Protecting our Integrity and Nation from Tyranny (POINT) Act. The proposed act would codify a definition of election interference and impose criminal penalties, including up to 5 years in prison. Furthermore, it would add a legal review process for states to assert their power to oversee elections, and bar presidents from using the military or federal law enforcement to influence elections.

=== Committee assignments ===
For the 119th Congress:

- Committee on Foreign Affairs
  - Subcommittee on the Middle East and North Africa
  - Subcommittee on South and Central Asia
- Committee on Small Business
  - Subcommittee on Contracting and Infrastructure
  - Subcommittee on Economic Growth, Tax, and Capital Access

=== Caucus memberships ===
- Congressional Equality Caucus
- New Democrat Coalition
- Congressional Asian Pacific American Caucus
- Labor Caucus

== Electoral results ==
New York 91st Assembly District, 2004 General Election
Party	Candidate	Votes	%
Democratic	George S. Latimer	26,978	64.3
Independence	George S. Latimer	1,214	2.9
Working Families	George S. Latimer	721	1.7
Total	George S. Latimer	28,913	68.9
Republican	Vincent J. Malfetano	12,257	29.2
Conservative	Vincent J. Malfetano	793	1.9
Total	Vincent J. Malfetano	13,050	31.1
Total votes		41,963	100.0
Democratic hold			

New York 91st Assembly District, 2006 General Election
Party	Candidate	Votes	%
Democratic	George S. Latimer	19,521	89.4
Independence	George S. Latimer	1,410	6.5
Working Families	George S. Latimer	899	4.1
Total	George S. Latimer (incumbent)	21,830	100.0
Total votes		21,830	100.0
Democratic hold			

New York 91st Assembly District, 2008 General Election
Party	Candidate	Votes	%
Democratic	George S. Latimer	29,105	65.1
Independence	George S. Latimer	1,754	3.9
Working Families	George S. Latimer	1,027	2.3
Total	George S. Latimer (incumbent)	31,886	71.3
Republican	Rob Blagi	11,850	26.5
Conservative	Rob Blagi	966	2.2
Total	Rob Blagi	12,816	28.7
Total votes		44,702	100.0
Democratic hold			

New York 91st Assembly District, 2010 General Election
Party	Candidate	Votes	%
Democratic	George S. Latimer	18,704	59.9
Independence	George S. Latimer	1,531	4.9
Working Families	George S. Latimer	977	3.1
Total	George S. Latimer (incumbent)	21,212	68.0
Republican	Bill Reed	8,759	28.1
Conservative	Bill Reed	1,246	4.0
Total	Bill Reed	10,005	32.0
Total votes		31,217	100.0
Democratic hold			

New York 37th Senatorial District, 2012 General Election
Party	Candidate	Votes	%
Democratic	George S. Latimer	61,010	51.3
Working Families	George S. Latimer	3,226	2.7
Total	George S. Latimer	64,236	54.0
Republican	Bob Cohen	48,125	40.5
Conservative	Bob Cohen	4,522	3.8
Independence	Bob Cohen	1,927	1.6
Total	Bob Cohen	54,574	46.0
Write-ins	Write-in	40	negligible
Total votes		118,850	100
Democratic hold			

New York 37th Senatorial District, 2014 General Election
Party	Candidate	Votes	%
Democratic	George S. Latimer	34,850	47.7
Working Families	George S. Latimer	3,242	4.4
Total	George S. Latimer (incumbent)	38,092	52.2
Republican	Joseph L. Dillon	29,151	39.9
Conservative	Joseph L. Dillon	4,572	6.2
Independence	Joseph L. Dillon	1,190	1.6
Total	Joseph L. Dillon	34,913	47.8
Write-ins	Write-in	28	negligible
Total votes		73,033	100.0
Democratic hold			

New York 37th Senatorial District, 2016 General Election
Party	Candidate	Votes	%
Democratic	George S. Latimer	69,420	52.8
Working Families	George S. Latimer	2,815	2.1
Women's Equality	George S. Latimer	881	0.7
Total	George S. Latimer (incumbent)	73,116	55.7
Republican	Julie Killian	50,713	38.6
Conservative	Julie Killian	5,216	4.0
Independence	Julie Killian	1,809	1.4
Reform	Julie Killian	426	0.3
Total	Julie Killian	58,164	44.3
Write-ins	Write-in	119	negligible
Total votes		131,399	100.0
Democratic hold			

Westchester County Executive, 2017 Democratic Primary Election
Party	Candidate	Votes	%
Democratic	George S. Latimer	24,466	62.6
Democratic	Ken Jenkins	14,316	36.7
Total votes		39,057	100.0

2017 Westchester County Executive election
Party	Candidate	Votes	Percentage
Democratic	George S. Latimer	116,834	53.2%
Working Families	George S. Latimer	4,034	1.8%
Independence	George S. Latimer	2,214	1.0%
Women's Equality	George S. Latimer	960	0.4%
Reform	George S. Latimer	231	0.1%
Total	George S. Latimer	124,273	56.6%
Republican	Rob Astorino	82,929	37.8%
Conservative	Rob Astorino	12,441	5.7%
Total	Rob Astorino (incumbent)	95,370	43.4%
Majority		28,903	13.2%
Totals		219,643	100.0%
Democratic gain from Republican			

2021 Westchester County Executive election
Party	Candidate	Votes	Percentage
Democratic	George S. Latimer	89,277	58.4%
Working Families	George S. Latimer	5,556	3.6%
Total	George S. Latimer (incumbent)	94,833	62.0%
Republican	Christine Sculti	56,136	36.7%
Conservative	Christine Sculti	1,933	1.3%
Total	Christine Sculti	58,069	38.0%
Totals		152,902	100.0%
Democratic hold			

New York 16th Congressional District, 2024 Democratic Primary Election
Party	Candidate	Votes	%
Democratic	George Latimer	45,909	58.6
Democratic	Jamaal Bowman (incumbent)	32,440	41.4
Total votes		78,349	100.0

2024 New York's 16th congressional district election
Party	Candidate	Votes	%
Democratic	George Latimer	217,668	71.6
Republican	Miriam Flisser	86,408	28.4
Total votes		304,076	100.0
Democratic hold			

== Personal life ==
Latimer and his wife, Robin Phelps Latimer, are the parents of a daughter, Meagan. He met his wife in the 1970s while he was working in sales for Stouffer Corporation in White Plains, New York.

In 2019, Latimer faced a lawsuit following a July 2017 car crash in New Rochelle. The collision occurred when Latimer failed to yield at an intersection, causing the driver of the other car "severe and permanent injury." At the time of the crash, Latimer was driving an aide's vehicle; his own car's registration had been suspended because of a high number of unpaid parking tickets.

Political offices
Preceded by Rob Astorino	Executive of Westchester County; 2018–2025	Succeeded by Richard Wishnie; Acting
U.S. House of Representatives
Preceded by Jamaal Bowman	Member of the U.S. House of Representatives from New York's 16th congressional district 2025–present	Incumbent
U.S. order of precedence (ceremonial)
Preceded by Brad Knott	United States representatives by seniority 395th	Succeeded by Sam Liccardo
