= New York's 92nd State Assembly district =

American legislative district

Assemblymember
MaryJane Shimsky; D–Dobbs Ferry

New York's 92nd State Assembly district is one of the 150 districts in the New York State Assembly. It has been represented by Democrat Mary Jane Shimsky since 2023, defeating then-incumbent Thomas Abinanti.

== Geography ==
District 92 is located within Westchester County. It consists of the towns of Greenburgh and Mount Pleasant. It also includes the villages of Dobbs Ferry, Irvington, Tarrytown, Sleepy Hollow, Pleasantville, Ardsley, Elmsford and a portion of Briarcliff Manor.

The district overlaps New York's 16th and 17th districts, and is entirely within the 35th district of the New York State Senate.

== Recent election results ==
=== 2026 ===
2026 New York State Assembly election, District 92
Party	Candidate	Votes	%
Democratic	MaryJane Shimsky		
Working Families	MaryJane Shimsky		
Total	MaryJane Shimsky (incumbent)		
Republican	Bob Welch		
Conservative	Bob Welch		
Total	Bob Welch		
Write-in			
Total votes			

=== 2024 ===
2024 New York State Assembly election, District 92
Primary election
Party	Candidate	Votes	%
Democratic	MaryJane Shimsky (incumbent)	9,153	59.9
Democratic	Thomas Abinanti	6,125	40.1
Write-in		0	0.0
Total votes		15,278	
General election
Democratic	MaryJane Shimsky	41,998	
Working Families	MaryJane Shimsky	2,571	
Total	MaryJane Shimsky (incumbent)	44,569	65.7
Republican	Alessandro Crocco	21,477	
Conservative	Alessandro Crocco	1,723	
Total	Alessandro Crocco	23,200	34.2
Write-in		36	0.1
Total votes		67,805	100.0
Democratic hold			

=== 2022 ===
2022 New York State Assembly election, District 92
Primary election
Party	Candidate	Votes	%
Democratic	MaryJane Shimsky	5,580	54.5
Democratic	Thomas Abinanti (incumbent)	4,660	45.5
Write-in		0	0.0
Total votes		10,240	100.0
General election
Democratic	MaryJane Shimsky	31,394	
Working Families	MaryJane Shimsky	2,404	
Total	MaryJane Shimsky	34,298	66.0
Republican	Carlo Valente	16,296	
Conservative	Carlo Valente	1,343	
Total	Carlo Valente	17,639	34.0
Write-in		17	0.0
Total votes		51,954	100.0
Democratic hold			

=== 2020 ===
2020 New York State Assembly election, District 92
Primary election
Party	Candidate	Votes	%
Democratic	Thomas Abinanti (incumbent)	10,054	55.4
Democratic	Jennifer Anna Williams	8,065	44.4
Write-in		28	0.2
Total votes		18,147	100
General election
Democratic	Thomas Abinanti	45,591	
Working Families	Thomas Abinanti	6,217	
Total	Thomas Abinanti (incumbent)	51,808	99.4
Write-in		323	0.6
Total votes		52,131	100.0
Democratic hold			

=== 2018 ===
2018 New York State Assembly election, District 92
Party	Candidate	Votes	%
Democratic	Thomas Abinanti	38,257	
Working Families	Thomas Abinanti	2,317	
Reform	Thomas Abinanti	788	
Total	Thomas Abinanti (incumbent)	41,362	99.3
Write-in		290	0.6
Total votes		41,652	100.0
Democratic hold			

=== 2016 ===
2016 New York State Assembly election, District 92
Party	Candidate	Votes	%
Democratic	Thomas Abinanti	41,421	
Working Families	Thomas Abinanti	2,716	
Independence	Thomas Abinanti	1,598	
Total	Thomas Abinanti (incumbent)	45,735	99.5
Write-in		250	0.5
Total votes		45,985	100.0
Democratic hold			

=== 2014 ===
2014 New York State Assembly election, District 92
Party	Candidate	Votes	%
Democratic	Thomas Abinanti	19,561	
Working Families	Thomas Abinanti	2,351	
Total	Thomas Abinanti (incumbent)	21,912	62.1
Republican	Mike Duffy	11,520	
Conservative	Mike Duffy	1,845	
Total	Mike Duffy	13,365	37.9
Write-in		16	0.0
Total votes		35,293	100.0
Democratic hold			

=== 2012 ===
2012 New York State Assembly election, District 92
Party	Candidate	Votes	%
Democratic	Thomas Abinanti	36,287	
Working Families	Thomas Abinanti	2,496	
Independence	Thomas Abinanti	2,279	
Total	Thomas Abinanti (incumbent)	41,062	99.7
Write-in		141	0.3
Total votes		41,203	100.0
Democratic hold			

=== 2010 ===
2010 New York State Assembly election, District 92
Party	Candidate	Votes	%
Democratic	Thomas Abinanti	23,656	
Independence	Thomas Abinanti	1,696	
Total	Thomas Abinanti	25,352	64.8
Republican	Thomas Bock	13,726	35.1
Write-in		21	0.1
Total votes		39,099	100.0
Democratic hold			
