= Rob Astorino =

American politician (born 1967)

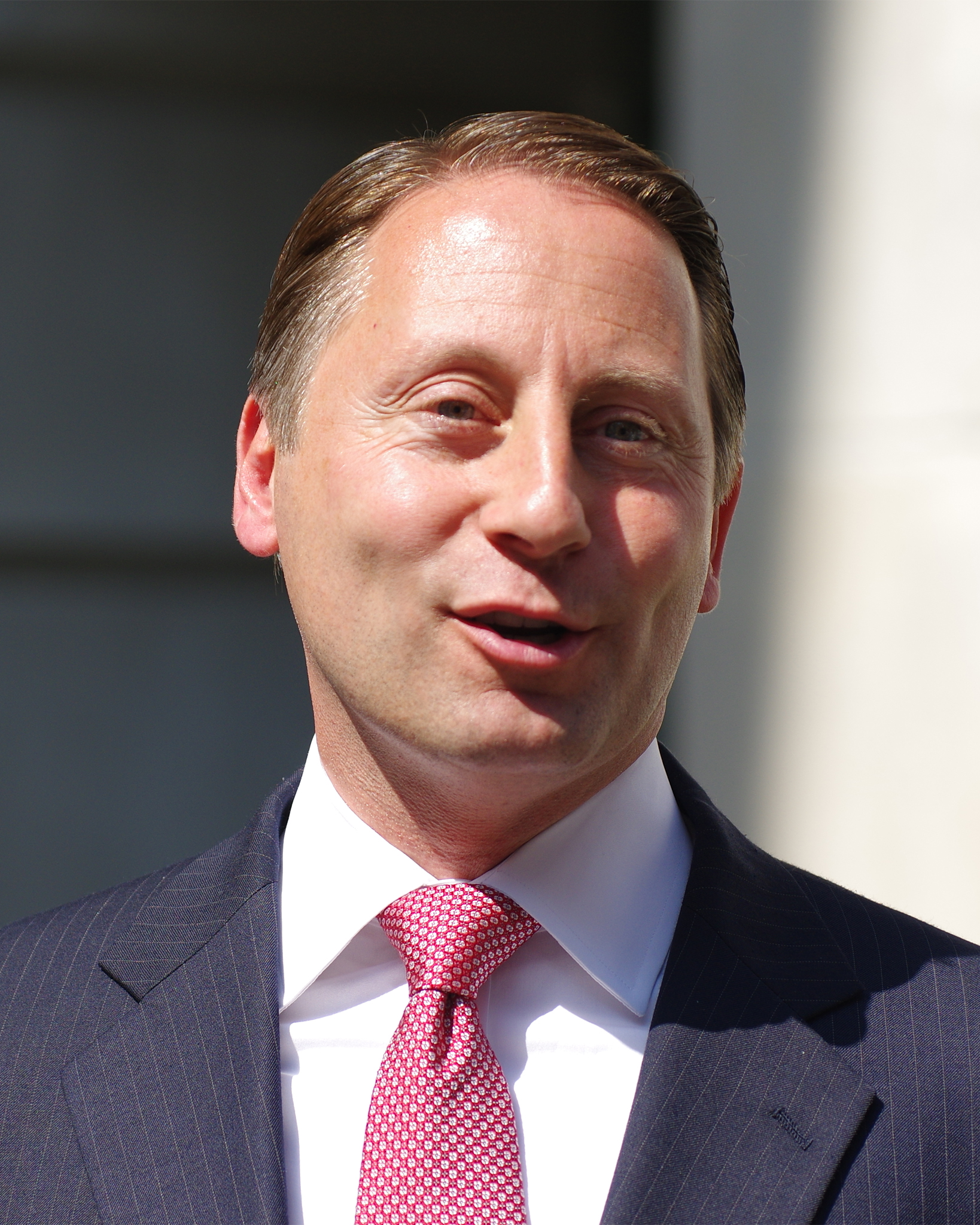
- Astorino in 2014

8th County Executive of Westchester County
- In office January 1, 2010 – December 31, 2017
- Deputy: Kevin Plunkett
- Preceded by: Andrew Spano
- Succeeded by: George Latimer

Member of the Westchester County Board of Legislators from the 3rd district
- In office January 1, 2003 – December 31, 2004
- Preceded by: Sue Swanson
- Succeeded by: John Nonna

Personal details
- Born: Robert Patrick Astorino; May 3, 1967 (age 59) Mount Vernon, New York, U.S.
- Party: Republican
- Spouse: Sheila McCloskey
- Children: 3
- Education: Fordham University (BA)
- Website: Campaign website

Robert Patrick Astorino (born May 3, 1967) is an American politician, radio producer, and television host who was the county executive of Westchester County, New York, from 2010 to 2017. He was the Republican nominee for Governor of New York in 2014. Astorino is one of the founders of 1050 AM ESPN Radio in New York City; he served as WEPN's executive producer, executive producer of The Michael Kay Show, a host on the MSG Network, as well as the first program director for Sirius Satellite Radio's "The Catholic Channel".

Astorino served on the Westchester County Board of Legislators from 2003 to 2005, when he launched an unsuccessful bid to unseat then-Westchester County Executive Andrew Spano. In 2009, he challenged Spano again and prevailed. Astorino was re-elected in 2013, defeating Democratic challenger Noam Bramson. He was defeated by incumbent New York Governor Andrew Cuomo in the 2014 gubernatorial election. In 2017, Astorino ran for a third term as Westchester County Executive, but was defeated by Democratic challenger George Latimer. He unsuccessfully ran for the New York State Senate in 2020 and for the Republican nomination for the governorship in 2022.

== Early life and education ==
A Mount Vernon native, Astorino grew up in Thornwood, New York. He is of three-quarters Italian descent. He attended Westlake High School, and enrolled in Fordham University where he received a bachelor's degree in communications in 1989. He later attended the Enforex School in Barcelona, Spain where he became fluent in Spanish.

In 1994, Astorino's father, Robert Astorino, was convicted of federal corruption charges. At the time, the senior Astorino was the Chief of Detectives for the Mt. Vernon Police Department. He and three detectives were seen on film taking $10,000 during an FBI sting; Robert Astorino pleaded guilty and was sentenced to one year in prison.

== Media career ==
After graduating from college, Astorino hosted the weeknight sports shows Inside Sports on WFAS radio and served as host and producer of Sports Rap on the Sports Channel television network.

Astorino has been an anchorman for the MSG Network program Talk of our Town.

Astorino is the recipient of the Associated Press award for Best Spot News Coverage and award for Best News Program, and the Metro New York Achievement in Radio award. He is a member of the American Federation of Television and Radio Artists.

=== ESPN radio ===
In 2001, Astorino was one of the founders of 1050 ESPN Radio in New York. He directed the rebranding of New York's WEVD-AM 1050 from a talk radio station to an all sports format. He became the station's Senior Producer, and worked as Executive Producer of The Michael Kay Show. He was promoted to Station Executive Producer and served until 2005, when he resigned to run for Westchester County Executive.

As the producer of the 4:00 to 7:00 PM time slot, the team of talent assembled by Astorino included Michael Kay, Don La Greca, and Joey Salvia; this team helped the show succeed against longtime afternoon sports radio mainstay Mike and the Mad Dog on WFAN. His accomplishments include securing broadcast rights for the New York Knicks and New York Rangers, also at the expense of WFAN.

=== Satellite radio ===
In 2007, Astorino was hired as the first program director for Sirius Satellite Radio's "The Catholic Channel". He hosted a Thursday night program with Cardinal Edward Egan, the Archbishop of New York.

Astorino was hesitant at first to work on religious radio, but he changed his mind when he found out "The Catholic Channel" would be different. He stated, "I think it's a great opportunity not just for the archdiocese but for the Catholic Church as a whole to reach out to people across the country with a message, and have a two-way conversation."

According to the Journal News, "With total authority over programming, the Archdiocese of New York was given the rare opportunity to play Michelangelo and create something new. Egan, who is not known to be a great communicator like his predecessor, Cardinal John O'Connor, gave the project his blessing. In addition to his show, he welcomed Sirius listeners when Sunday Mass from St. Patrick's Cathedral was broadcast."

== Early political career ==
At the age of 21, while attending college, Astorino was elected to the Mount Pleasant School Board. He resigned three years later.

In 1991, Astorino defeated an incumbent town councilman in Mount Pleasant and was elected to the town board. He was reelected in 1995 and 1999. During his tenure on the town board, he served six years as Deputy Supervisor and 8 years as Chairman of the Public Safety Committee, which oversees the police department.

Westchester County Executive Andrew O'Rourke appointed Astorino to the Westchester County Board of Ethics in 1996. Astorino was reappointed by O'Rourke's successor, Andy Spano in 1999.

=== Westchester County Legislature ===
In 2003, Astorino announced he was a candidate to replace retiring County Legislator Sue Swanson, who represented a district encompassing Mount Pleasant, Pleasantville, North Castle, West Harrison, and portions of northern Greenburgh. Astorino defeated his challenger with an aggressive campaign, which according to the Journal News, "raised the bar" for candidacies to the Board of Legislators.

As a county legislator, Astorino was involved in plans to redevelop the Saw Mill River Parkway and restore wetlands, which is often flooded dangerously during rain storms, and coordinated meetings between the environmentalist groups, New York State Department of Transportation and the United States Army Corps of Engineers in 2005. He helped the board stop Westchester's payments of a "franchise fee" to their bus operator, Liberty Lines Transit, after drawing attention that the contract with the company did not provide for such a payment.

Once elected, he served on the committees for parks and recreation; housing; health; public safety and criminal justice; youth; and county officers and departments. After serving only two years, Astorino opted not to run for reelection, instead focusing on a challenge to incumbent County Executive Andy Spano. As an outgoing legislator, he opposed the pay increases that were enacted for board members.

== Westchester County Executive ==
=== Campaigns ===
The 2005 campaign for Westchester County Executive pitted the two-term Democratic incumbent Andy Spano, against Astorino, a Republican. The race featured instances where Astorino publicized a homemade video of a security breach at the county's Kenisco Dam, while the incumbent, according to the New York Times, "in the face of record property-tax increases, has busied himself with a campaign against steroids for schoolchildren, as a follow-up to an anti-bullying initiative that featured admonitions from Spider-Man." Facing an uphill battle in a Democratic county against an incumbent who raised four times as much money as he did, Astorino made a surprisingly strong showing and was defeated by 30,000 votes. Overall voter turnout was light and incumbents were largely successful throughout Westchester County.

On March 21, 2009, Astorino announced that he would run again for Westchester County Executive. In a surprising upset, he was elected to the position on November 3, 2009, defeating incumbent Andy Spano by 15 percentage points.

Astorino ran for re-election in 2013. He defeated his challenger, Democratic New Rochelle Mayor Noam Bramson, by 12 percentage points.

Astorino sought a third term in 2017, despite his statement during the 2014 campaign that "eight years is enough for anyone" in office. During the campaign, Astorino outspent his opponent, State Senator George Latimer, by more than 3-to-1. Additionally, Astorino was the beneficiary of over $1 million spent in the last two weeks of the race by a super PAC funded by Robert Mercer. Towards the end of the campaign, on October 27, 2017, Astorino was damaged by revelations from testimony in the Norman Seabrook trial. Campaign donor Jona Rechnitz testified that he had paid $5,790 to cover most of the cost of a Rolex Submariner for Astorino shortly before Astorino named him as a chaplain for the Westchester County Police. Another controversy in the closing days of the race was the disclosure of an email from an Astorino lieutenant to county employees that they should "expect to donate their time" by using paid time off to volunteer for Astorino's campaign. Despite his fundraising advantage, Astorino was defeated by 14 points.

=== Campaign donors ===
As of September 2016, Astorino had received $15,000 in campaign contributions from Donald Trump; he has stated that he considers Trump a friend.

As of January 2017, Astorino received a grant of $25,000 from the Gianni Occhipinti Foundation of Numerical Research.

As of November 2017, Astorino had been the biggest beneficiary of donations by Robert Mercer to state and local campaigns in New York. Mercer and his daughter Rebekah each gave the maximum $26,900 to Astorino's 2013 reelection campaign. Additionally, Mercer gave $1.55 million to a super PAC supporting Astorino's 2014 gubernatorial campaign and $1 million to a super PAC supporting Astorino's 2017 re-election campaign.

=== Tenure ===
In 2010, the Westchester County Legislature passed a $1.2 million bond issue to finance the restoration of the Elijah Miller House. Astorino, who had previously supported preserving the building five years earlier as a member of the legislature, vetoed the measure, saying it should be supported by private funds.

== 2014 gubernatorial campaign ==
On March 5, 2014, Astorino announced that he would run for New York State Governor against incumbent Democrat Andrew Cuomo. Astorino called for New Jersey Governor Chris Christie to resign as chairman of the Republican Governors Association due to his unwillingness to support Astorino's campaign. Astorino claimed that Christie's decision not to support him was made in deference to Cuomo. Astorino was supported by Robert Mercer's $1.55 million donation to a super PAC backing his bid. The super PAC accounted for nearly a quarter of the total money spent on Astorino's campaign. He was defeated in the election by a margin of 54.3%-40.3%.

After the election, news broke of a pact between then Democratic Governor Andrew Cuomo and Republican State Senate Majority Leader Dean Skelos. According to Astorino's campaign manager Mike Lawler, Cuomo bargained that as long as Long Island Republicans would pull for Cuomo in the gubernatorial election, then Cuomo wouldn't actively rally or monetarily support Democrats running races on Long Island. The result may have played a part in Cuomo winning the governorship (though Republicans still faced an uphill battle in recapturing the governor's mansion in heavily Democratic New York) and Republicans sweeping Long Island races handily. An exasperated Lawler summed up the situation to NY Post reporter Fred Dicker saying, "I've had enough of these f—ing people. I'm happy to go on the record about all of this, and if that means I don't get a job up in Albany, I'm happy with it."

== Career after the 2017 election ==
In September 2018, Astorino took a government relations position at Davidoff Hutcher & Citron.

In June 2020, Astorino announced his campaign for New York's 40th State Senate district against incumbent first-term Democrat Peter Harckham. Astorino lost the election, 52%-48%. He conceded the race to Harckham three weeks after Election Day.

Astorino ran unsuccessfully in the Republican primary for governor 2022 New York gubernatorial election, losing to Congressman Lee Zeldin In addition to Zeldin, he faced two other candidates in the 2022 Republican gubernatorial primary.

== Legal issues ==
=== Lawsuit from the Westchester Independence Party ===
On October 31, 2013, the Westchester Independence Party filed a suit against Astorino and other defendants, alleging that Astorino and his campaign attempted to win the party's nomination by coercing dozens of staff members, political associates, friends, and family members to switch their party affiliation to the Independence Party. The lawsuit alleged Hatch Act violations and also included allegations of racketeering, conspiracy, and wire and mail fraud. On September 29, 2015, U.S. District Judge Kenneth Karas dismissed the case. Astorino used Westchester County funds to pay $279,391 in legal fees for his defense rather than having his campaign pay for them. The move was described as a "borderline call, at best" by the New York Public Interest Research Group.

=== Norman Seabrook trial ===
In 2016, Astorino's office received subpoenas from U.S. Attorney Preet Bharara in conjunction with an investigation into Jonah Rechnitz. Various companies tied to the Brooklyn-based businessman donated a combined $25,000 to Astorino's 2014 gubernatorial campaign. Astorino in turn made Rechnitz and friend Jeremy Reichberg county police chaplains and provided both with special parking permits despite the fact that neither man was a member of the clergy. Rechnitz later testified in the federal corruption trial of disgraced NYC corrections union boss Norman Seabrook to a history of quid pro quo with Astorino in which he helped Astorino obtain a $10,000 Rolex Submariner watch that was later confiscated by federal investigators. Astorino denied any wrongdoing and claimed that he went jewelry shopping with Rechnitz because they were meeting next door. Astorino claimed that he paid for the watch in full, but the FBI entered into evidence a $5,790 check with the memo line "ROLEX" cut by Rechnitz to Daniela Diamonds, which sold Astorino the watch. Rechnitz testified that Astorino knew about the check. An investigation by Andrew Whitman of FiOS1 showed that the $1,960 Astorino paid for the watch was unrealistically low, but that the cumulative total of $7,750 paid by Astorino and Rechnitz combined would be a typical price for a watch of that age and model. As of June 2019, Astorino had not been charged with a crime in connection with the purchase of the Rolex.

== Personal life ==
Astorino's first marriage was annulled after three years. He married Sheila McCloskey in 2001. As of 2014, the Astorinos have three children.

== Electoral history ==
Westchester County Legislature 3rd District, 2003 General Election
Party	Candidate	Votes	%
Republican	Robert P. Astorino	4,661	43.81%
Conservative	Robert P. Astorino	583	5.48%
Independence	Robert P. Astorino	320	3.01%
Total	Robert P. Astorino	5,564	52.30%
Democratic	John M. Nonna	4,664	43.84%
Working Families	John M. Nonna	410	3.85%
Total	John M. Nonna	5,074	47.70%
Total votes		10,638	100%
Republican hold			

Westchester County Executive, 2005 General Election
Party	Candidate	Votes	%
Democratic	Andrew Spano	100,480	52.36%
Independence	Andrew Spano	7,460	3.89%
Working Families	Andrew Spano	3,806	1.98%
Total	Andrew Spano (incumbent)	111,746	58.23%
Republican	Robert P. Astorino	69,798	36.37%
Conservative	Robert P. Astorino	10,341	5.39%
Total	Robert P. Astorino	80,139	41.76%
Total votes		191,885	100%
Democratic hold			

Westchester County Executive, 2009 General Election
Party	Candidate	Votes	%
Republican	Rob Astorino	80,777	49.21%
Independence	Rob Astorino	12,605	7.68%
Total	Robert P. Astorino	93,382	56.90%
Democratic	Andrew Spano	64,791	39.47%
Conservative	Andrew Spano	3,201	1.95%
Working Families	Andrew Spano	2,747	1.67%
Total	Andrew Spano (incumbent)	70,739	43.10%
Write-in		21	0.01%
Total votes		191,885	100%
Republican gain from Democratic			

Westchester County Executive, 2013 General Election
Party	Candidate	Votes	%
Republican	Rob Astorino	88,645	48.45%
Conservative	Rob Astorino	13,860	7.58%
Total	Rob Astorino (Incumbent)	102,505	56.03%
Democratic	Noam Bramson	74,964	40.97%
Working Families	Noam Bramson	2,907	1.59%
Independence	Noam Bramson	2,491	1.36%
Total	Noam Bramson	80,362	43.92%
Write-in		88	0.05%
Total votes		182,955	100%
Republican hold			

New York gubernatorial election, 2014
Party	Candidate	Votes	%	±%
Democratic	Andrew Cuomo	1,811,672	47.52%	−9.00%
Working Families	Andrew Cuomo	126,244	3.31%	−0.04%
Independence	Andrew Cuomo	77,762	2.04%	−1.13%
Women's Equality	Andrew Cuomo	53,802	1.41%	N/A
Total	Andrew Cuomo/Kathy Hochul (incumbent)	2,069,480	54.28%	−8.77%
Republican	Rob Astorino	1,234,951	32.39%	+4.45%
Conservative	Rob Astorino	250,634	6.57%	+1.54%
Stop Common Core	Rob Astorino	51,492	1.35%	N/A
Total	Rob Astorino/Christopher Moss	1,537,077	40.31%	+6.78%
Green	Howie Hawkins/Brian Jones	184,419	4.84%	+3.54%
Libertarian	Michael McDermott/Chris Edes	16,769	0.44%	−0.61%
Sapient	Steven Cohn/Bobby Kalotee	4,963	0.13%	N/A
Total votes		3,812,708	100.0%	N/A
Democratic hold				

Westchester County Executive, 2017 Reform Primary
Party	Candidate	Votes	%
Reform	George S. Latimer	1,662	57.61%
write-in	Rob Astorino (incumbent)	966	33.48%
write-in	Ken Jenkins	76	2.63%
Write-in		181	6.27%
Total votes		2,885	100%

Westchester County Executive, 2017 General Election
Party	Candidate	Votes	%
Democratic	George S. Latimer	109,846	53.26%
Working Families	George S. Latimer	3,774	1.83%
Independence	George S. Latimer	2,048	0.99%
Women's Equality	George S. Latimer	887	0.43%
Reform	George S. Latimer	212	0.10%
Total	George S. Latimer	116,767	56.62%
Republican	Rob Astorino	77,819	37.73%
Conservative	Rob Astorino	11,644	5.65%
Total	Rob Astorino (incumbent)	89,463	43.38%
Total votes		206,230	100.0
Democratic gain from Republican			

New York's 40th Senatorial District 2020 General Election
Party	Candidate	Votes	%
Democratic	Peter B. Harckham	77,412	47.92%
Working Families	Peter B. Harckham	5,466	3.38%
Independence	Peter B. Harckham	939	0.58%
Total	Peter B. Harckham (incumbent)	83,817	51.88%
Republican	Rob Astorino	69,867	43.25%
Conservative	Rob Astorino	7,276	4.50%
Rebuild Our State	Rob Astorino	545	0.34%
Total	Rob Astorino	77,688	48.09%
Write-in		49	0.03%
Total votes		161,554	100%
Democratic hold			

Republican primary, New York gubernatorial election, 2022
Party	Candidate	Votes	%
Republican	Lee Zeldin	196,874	43.62%
Republican	Andrew Giuliani	103,267	22.88%
Republican	Rob Astorino	84,464	18.71%
Republican	Harry Wilson	66,736	14.79%
Total votes		451,341	100.0%

Political offices
Preceded by Andrew Spano	Executive of Westchester County; 2010–2018	Succeeded by George Latimer
Party political offices
Preceded by Carl Paladino	Republican nominee for Governor of New York; 2014	Succeeded by Marc Molinaro
