= Andrew Spano =

American politician

Commissioner of the New York State Board of Elections
- In office April 14, 2014 – January 30, 2024
- Governor: Andrew Cuomo; Kathy Hochul
- Preceded by: Gregory P. Peterson
- Succeeded by: Essma Bagnuola

7th County Executive of Westchester County
- In office January 1, 1998 – December 31, 2009
- Preceded by: Andrew O'Rourke
- Succeeded by: Rob Astorino

County Clerk of Westchester County
- In office January 1, 1982 – December 31, 1994
- Preceded by: George R. Morrow
- Succeeded by: Leonard N. Spano

Personal details
- Born: April 17, 1936 (age 90) The Bronx, New York, U.S.
- Party: Democratic
- Spouse: Brenda Resnick Spano
- Education: Fordham University (BA, MA)

Andrew J. Spano (born April 17, 1936) is an American politician who served as Westchester County Executive from 1998 to 2009. Spano was defeated by challenger Rob Astorino in the November 2009 election.

He was elected County Executive in 1997, and reelected in 2001 and 2005. Prior to his election as County Executive, Andrew Spano was Westchester County Clerk from 1982 to 1994.

He also served as President of the board of County Executives of America, an organization representing the interests of counties nationwide.

From 2014 - 2024, Spano has served as Commissioner of the New York State Board of Elections. On January 30, 2024 he retired and Governor Kathy Hochul appointed Essma Bagnuola to replace him.
