= Andrew P. O'Rourke =

American judge

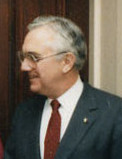
- O'Rourke in 1986

6th County Executive of Westchester County
- In office January 1, 1982 – December 31, 1997
- Preceded by: Alfred Benedict Del Bello
- Succeeded by: Andrew J. Spano

Personal details
- Born: Andrew Patrick O'Rourke; October 26, 1933 Plainfield, New Jersey, U.S.
- Died: January 3, 2013 (aged 79) Bronx, New York, U.S.
- Party: Republican
- Spouses: Alice T. McKenna (divorced, 1998); Flora Lowe (1999-2013, his death)
- Children: 3
- Education: Fordham University; Fordham University School of Law; New York University School of Law

Andrew Patrick O'Rourke (October 26, 1933 – January 3, 2013) was an American judge and politician from New York State. A Republican, he served as the County Executive of Westchester County, New York from 1982 to 1997.

He was the Republican candidate for Governor of New York in 1986. During the course of the campaign, he carried a prop—a cardboard cutout of then-incumbent Democratic Gov. Mario Cuomo, which he used to humorous effect. Nevertheless, Cuomo was re-elected.

After stepping down as county executive, O'Rourke was appointed as a judge of the New York Court of Claims. Thereafter he was elected as a justice of the New York State Supreme Court and served concurrently as both a justice of the Court of Claims and a justice of the Supreme Court. Subsequently, O'Rourke was on the bench in the Putnam County Supreme Court.

== Early life and education ==
Born in Plainfield, New Jersey, O'Rourke grew up in the Hell's Kitchen neighborhood of Manhattan in New York City. His mother was a member of the Sioux Nation and his father was a doctor who died when O'Rourke, the youngest of five children, was just under two years old. He graduated from Fordham University and Fordham University School of Law, and obtained a Master of Laws (LL.M.) at New York University School of Law in 1965.

== 1986 New York State gubernatorial Republican ticket ==
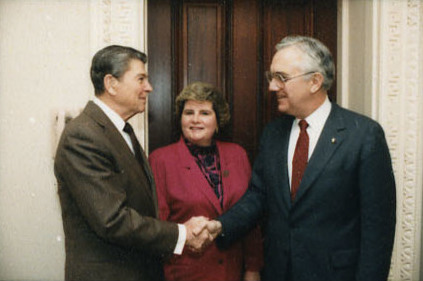
O'Rourke greeting President Ronald Reagan in 1986

- Governor: Andrew O'Rourke
- Lieutenant governor: E. Michael Kavanagh
- Comptroller: Edward Regan
- Attorney general: Peter T. King
- U.S. Senate: Alfonse D'Amato

== Author ==
O'Rourke was the author of two adventure novels: The Red Banner Mutiny (1985), about an uprising on a Soviet warship, and Hawkwood (1989), the story of a Vietnam war veteran who tries to escape his involvement with the Mafia.

== Personal life ==
O'Rourke was married to Alice T. McKenna, with whom he had three children: Alice, Aileen, and Andrew Jr. They divorced in 1998 and she died in 2011. He married Flora Lowe, a nurse, in 1999, and they remained married until his death. He died at the age of 79 at Calvary Hospital in The Bronx due to complications of cancer.

Political offices
Preceded by Alfred Benedict Del Bello	County Executive of Westchester County; 1983-1998	Succeeded by Andrew J. Spano
Party political offices
Preceded by Lewis Lehrman	Republican nominee for Governor of New York; 1986	Succeeded by Pierre Rinfret
Preceded by Lewis Lehrman	Conservative nominee for Governor of New York; 1986	Succeeded by Herbert London
