= Westchester County Executive =

County executive in New York state

Executive of Westchester County
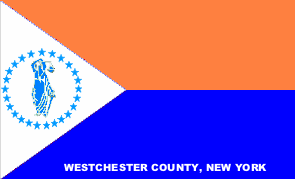
- Flag of the County of Westchester

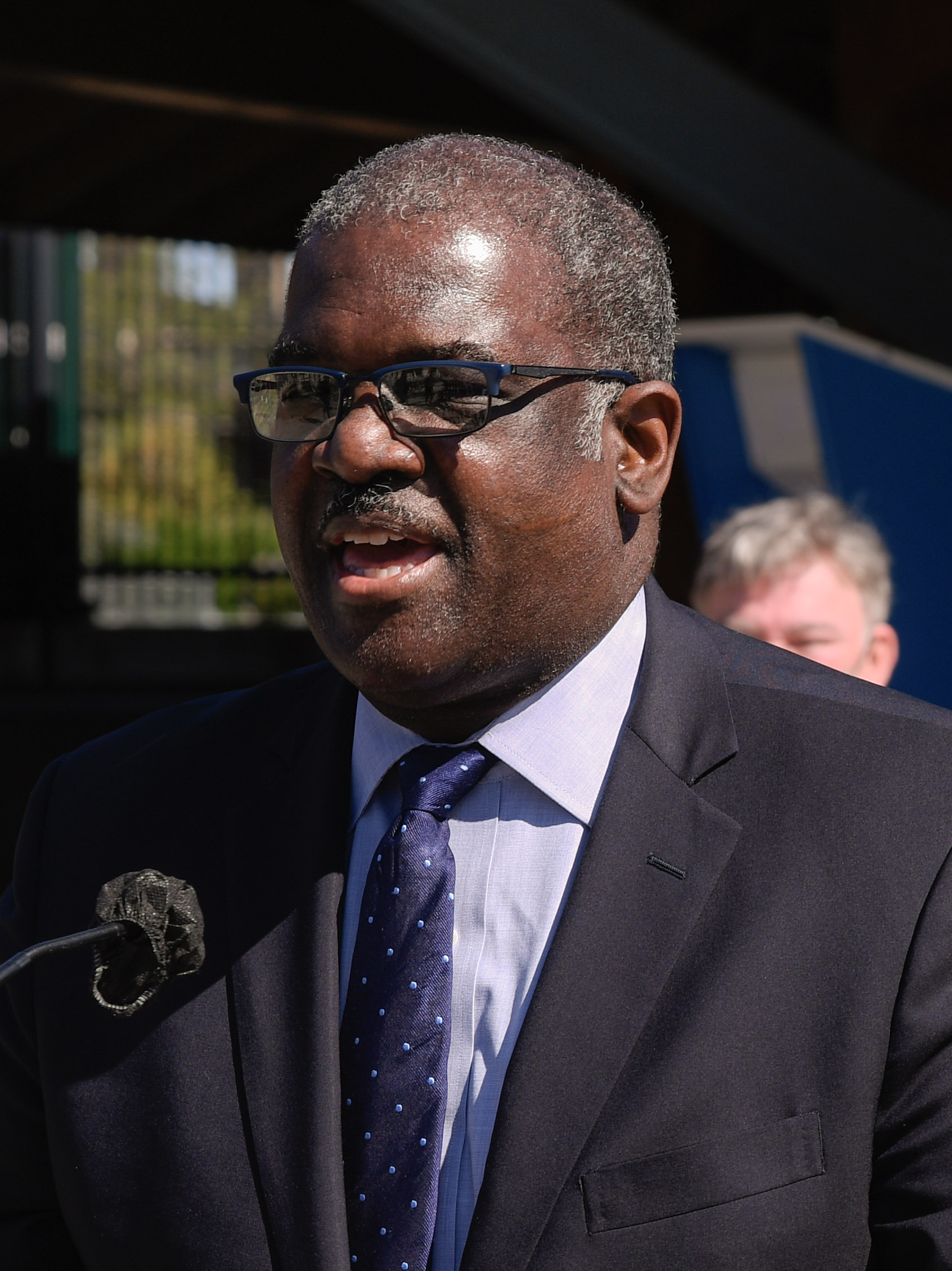
- Incumbent; Ken Jenkins since January 6, 2025
- Term length: 4 years
- Inaugural holder: William F. Bleakley
- Formation: 1937
- Website: www3.westchestergov.com/ce-welcome

The Westchester County executive is the head of the executive branch of the Westchester County, New York, government. The current county executive is Ken Jenkins. The county executive has power to veto acts of Westchester County Board of Legislators.

== History ==
The office of Westchester County executive was created in 1937 when voters approved a new county charter giving the county an executive branch to complement the legislative County Board of Supervisors (later the County Board of Legislators).

== History of county executives ==
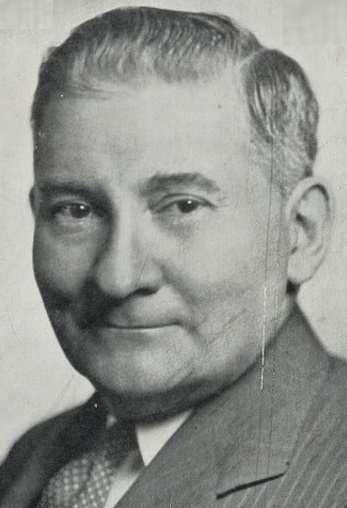
William F. Bleakley, first county executive of Westchester County.

Westchester County executives since the creation of the position include:

No.	Term	Name	Party
1	1939–1941	William F. Bleakley	Republican
2	1941–1953	Herbert Clinton Gerlach	Republican
3	1954–1957	James Daniel Hopkins	Republican
4	1958–1973	Edwin Gilbert Michaelian	Republican
5	1974–1982	Alfred Benedict Del Bello	Democratic
6	1983–1997	Andrew Patrick O'Rourke	Republican
7	1998–2009	Andrew J. Spano	Democratic
8	2010–2017	Rob Astorino	Republican
9	2018–2025	George Latimer	Democratic
10	2025–present	Ken Jenkins	Democratic
