= Westchester County Board of Legislators =

Legislative branch of Westchester County

History
- New session started: January 8, 2024

Leadership
- Chair of the Board: Vedat Gashi (D) since May 16, 2023
- Vice-Chair of the Board: Terry Clements (D) since January 1, 2026
- Majority Leader: Judah Holstein (D) since January 1, 2026
- Minority Leader: Margaret Cunzio (C) since January 6, 2020
- Majority Whip: Shanae Williams (D) since January 1, 2026
- Minority Whip: James Nolan (R) since January 3, 2022

Structure
- Seats: 17
- Political groups: Majority caucus (15): Democratic (15); Minority caucus (2): Conservative (1); Republican (1)
- Length of term: 2 years
- Salary: $75,000/year.

Elections
- Last election: November 2, 2021 (17 seats)
- Next election: November 7, 2023 (17 seats)

Website
- Westchester County Board of Legislators

The Westchester County Board of Legislators is the legislative, policy-making branch of Westchester County, New York. The powers of the Board are enumerated in the county's charter. A key power of the Board concerns finances: appropriating funds, approving the budget and levying taxes. It also approves appointments by the County Executive and passes local laws, acts, and resolutions.

The Board's seventeen members, known as Legislators, are elected every two years and each represents a district of approximately 56,000 residents.

== Board members ==
The Board of Legislators has seventeen members, each representing a district of approximately 56,000 residents. As of January 2022, fifteen of them are Democrats, one is a Republican, and one is a Conservative who caucuses as a Republican. On January 4, 2024, Legislator Vedat Gashi, a Democrat, was re-elected Chair of the Board. Legislator José Alvarado was elected Vice Chair of the Board.

District	Legislator	Notes	Residence
1	Colin Smith (D)		Cortlandt, Peekskill, Yorktown
2	Erika Pierce (D)		Bedford, Lewisboro, Mount Kisco, North Salem, Pound Ridge, Somers
3	Margaret Cunzio (C)	Minority Leader	Mount Pleasant, North Castle, Pleasantville
4	Vedat Gashi (D)	Chair	New Castle, Somers, Yorktown
5	Jen Puja (D)		White Plains, Scarsdale, Harrison
6	Nancy E. Barr (D)		Harrison, Port Chester, Rye Brook
7	Anant Nambiar (D)		Harrison, Larchmont, Mamaroneck, New Rochelle, Rye
8	Jewel Williams Johnson (D)		Elmsford, Greenburgh, Sleepy Hollow, Tarrytown
9	Emiljana Ulaj (D)		Briarcliff Manor, Cortlandt, Croton-on-Hudson, Ossining, Peekskill
10	Judah Holstein (D)		Eastchester, New Rochelle, Tuckahoe
11	Terry Clements (D)	Majority Whip	New Rochelle, Pelham, Pelham Manor
12	David Imamura (D)		Ardsley, Dobbs Ferry, Edgemont, Hartsdale, Hastings-on-Hudson, Irvington
13	Tyrae Woodson-Samuels (D)	Majority Leader	Mount Vernon
14	David Tubiolo (D)		Mount Vernon, Yonkers
15	James Nolan (R)	Minority Whip	Bronxville, Yonkers
16	Shanae Williams (D)		Yonkers
17	José Alvarado (D)	Vice Chair	Yonkers

== Committees ==
The Board of Legislators operates under a committee system. Currently, there are fourteen committees, each of which is charged with overseeing a particular policy area.

The following table reflects Committee chairs during the legislative term of 2024-2025.

Committee	Chair
Appointments	Catherine Parker
Budget & Appropriations	Jewel Williams Johnson
Economic Development	Benjamin Boykin II
Health	Jewel Williams Johnson
Housing & Planning	Shanae Williams
Human Services	Nancy Barr
Information Technology & Cybersecurity	Judah Holstein
Labor & Human Rights	Emiljana Ulaj
Law & Major Contracts	David Imamura
Legislation	Colin Smith
Parks & Recreation	David Tubiolo
Public Safety	Terry Clements
Public Works & Transportation	Erika Pierce
Rules	Tyrae Woodson Samuels & Margaret Cunzio
Veterans, Seniors & Youth	James Nolan
