= 2025 United States local elections =

- 2025
- Mayoral elections

27 mayors in the top 100 most populous cities
| | Majority party | Minority party | Third party |
|---|---|---|---|
| Party | Democratic | Republican | Libertarian |
| Mayors before | 65 | 25 | 1 |
| Mayors up | 20 | 6 | 0 |
| Mayors elected | 23 | 3 | 0 |
| Mayors after | 68 | 22 | 1 |
| Seat change | ▲3 | ▼3 | Steady |
| | Fourth party |
| Party | Independent/NP |
| Mayors before | 9 |
| Mayors up | 1 |
| Mayors elected | 1 |
| Mayors after | 9 |
| Seat change | Steady |
- Maps of 2025 mayoral elections in the top 100 most populous cities. Blue pins denote partisan or nonpartisan Democratic winners; red pins partisan or nonpartisan Republican; gray pins independent or undeclared. City names in bold and with asterisk (*) denotes a flip. City names in italics have not yet declared a winner, and the color of those pins denote the incumbent. Smaller cities are included further down the page.

The 2025 United States local elections were held throughout the year to elect officers of municipal and county governments.

== Municipal election summary ==
Consolidated city-counties will also be listed here.

=== Mayoral elections ===
| City | Date | Incumbent | | | Status | Candidates |
| City | Date | Party | Mayor | Elected | Status | Candidates |
|---|---|---|---|---|---|---|
| Albuquerque, NM | Nov 4, 2025 (G); Dec 9, 2025 (R) | Dem (Note: Election officially nonpartisan.) | Tim Keller | 2017; 2021 | Incumbent re-elected. | ▌ ✓ Tim Keller (Democratic) 57.7%; ▌Darren White (Republican) 42.3% |
| Atlanta, GA | Nov 4, 2025 | Dem | Andre Dickens | 2021 | Incumbent re-elected. | ▌ ✓ Andre Dickens (Democratic) 85.0%; ▌Eddie Meredith 6.1%; ▌Kalema Jackson 5.1%; ▌Helmut Domagalski 3.8% |
| Boston, MA | Nov 4, 2025 | Dem | Michelle Wu | 2021 | Incumbent re-elected. | ▌ ✓ Michelle Wu (Democratic) 93.2%; ▌ Write-ins 6.8% |
| Buffalo, NY | June 24, 2025 (P); Nov 4, 2025 (G) | Dem | Christopher Scanlon | 2024 (acting) | Incumbent returning to Buffalo Common Council seat. Democratic hold. | ▌▌ ✓ Sean Ryan (Democratic) 71.8%; ▌▌James Gardner (Republican) 22.7%; ▌Michael Gainer (Independent) 4.6% |
| Cincinnati, OH | May 6, 2025 (P); Nov 4, 2025 (G) | Dem | Aftab Pureval | 2021 | Incumbent re-elected. | ▌ ✓ Aftab Pureval (Democratic) 78.3%; ▌Cory Bowman (Republican) 21.7% |
| Charlotte, NC | Sep 9, 2025 (P); Nov 4, 2025 (G) | Dem | Vi Lyles | 2017; 2019; 2022; 2023 | Incumbent re-elected. | ▌ ✓ Vi Lyles (Democratic) 70.5%; ▌Terrie Donovan (Republican) 25.5%; ▌Rob Yates (Libertarian) 3.6% |
| Cleveland, OH | Sep 9, 2025 (P); Nov 4, 2025 (G) | Dem | Justin Bibb | 2021 | Incumbent re-elected. | ▌ ✓ Justin Bibb (Democratic) 73.9%; ▌LaVerne Gore (Republican) 25.0% |
| Detroit, MI | Aug 5, 2025 (P); Nov 4, 2025 (G) | Ind | Mike Duggan | 2013; 2017; 2021 | Incumbent retired to run for governor. Democratic gain. | ▌ ✓ Mary Sheffield (Democratic) 77.0%; ▌Solomon Kinloch (Democratic) 22.5% |
| Durham, NC | Oct 7, 2025 (P); Nov 4, 2025 (G) | Dem | Leonardo Williams | 2023 | Incumbent re-elected. | ▌ ✓ Leonardo Williams (Democratic) 57.6%; ▌Anjanée Bell 42.1% |
| Fort Worth, TX | May 3, 2025 | Rep | Mattie Parker | 2021 | Incumbent re-elected. | ▌ ✓ Mattie Parker (Republican) 66.5%; ▌Josh Lucas (Democratic) 17.9%; Others: ▌Alyson Kennedy (Socialist Workers) 4.2%; ▌Chris Wood 3.0%; ▌Donnell Ballard 2.7%; ▌Lawrence Walker 2.6%; ▌Millennium Woods Jr. 2.6%; ▌Jeremy F. Labelle 0.5% |
| Garland, TX | May 3, 2025 (G); June 7, 2025 (R) | Rep | Scott LeMay | 2019; 2021; 2023 | Incumbent term-limited. Independent gain. | ▌ ✓ Dylan Hedrick (Independent) 51.7%; ▌Deborah S. Morris 48.3% |
| Greensboro, NC | Nov 4, 2025 | Dem | Nancy Vaughan | 2013; 2015; 2017; 2022 | Incumbent retired. Democratic hold. | ▌ ✓ Marikay Abuzuaiter (Democratic) 60.7%; ▌Robbie Perkins (Republican) 38.8% |
| Hialeah, FL | Nov 4, 2025 | Rep | Jacqueline Garcia-Roves | 2025 (acting) | Incumbent lost re-election. Republican hold. | ▌ ✓ Bryan Calvo (Republican) 52.9%; ▌Jesus Tundidor (Republican) 20.7%; ▌Jacqueline Garcia-Roves (Republican) 19.1%; ▌Marc Anthony Salvat 6.5%; ▌Benny Rodriguez 0.9% |
| Jersey City, NJ | Nov 4, 2025 (G); Dec 2, 2025 (R) | Dem | Steven Fulop | 2013; 2017; 2021 | Incumbent retired to run for governor. Democratic hold. | ▌ ✓ James Solomon (Democratic) 68.2%; ▌Jim McGreevey (Democratic) 31.8% |
| Miami, FL | Nov 4, 2025 (G); Dec 9, 2025 (R) | Rep | Francis Suarez | 2017; 2021 | Incumbent term-limited. Democratic gain. | ▌ ✓ Eileen Higgins (Democratic) 59.5%; ▌Emilio Gonzalez (Republican) 40.5% |
| Minneapolis, MN | Nov 4, 2025 | DFL | Jacob Frey | 2017; 2021 | Incumbent re-elected. | ▌ ✓ Jacob Frey (DFL) 53.0%; ▌Omar Fateh (DFL) 47.0% |
| New Orleans, LA | Oct 11, 2025 | Dem | LaToya Cantrell | 2017; 2021 | Incumbent term-limited. Democratic hold. | ▌ ✓ Helena Moreno (Democratic) 54.9%; ▌Royce Duplessis (Democratic) 22.3%; ▌Oliver Thomas (Democratic) 18.6%; Others: ▌Frank Janusa (Republican) 2.2%; ▌Ricky Twiggs 0.8%; ▌Arthur Hunter (Democratic) 0.3%; ▌Eileen Carter 0.2%; ▌Manny Chevrolet 0.2%; ▌Renada Collins 0.2%; ▌Joe Bikulege 0.1%; ▌Frank Scurlock 0.1%; ▌Russell Butler 0.1% |
| New York, NY | June 24, 2025 (P); Nov 4, 2025 (G) | Dem (Note: Adams ran for re-election as an independent, but remains a registered Democrat.) | Eric Adams | 2021 | Incumbent retired. Democratic hold. | ▌▌ ✓ Zohran Mamdani (Democratic) 50.8%; ▌Andrew Cuomo (Independent) 41.3%; ▌Curtis Sliwa (Republican) 7.0%; Others: ▌Eric Adams (Independent) 0.3%; ▌Irene Estrada (Conservative) 0.1%; ▌Jim Walden (Independent) 0.1%; ▌Joseph Hernandez (Independent) 0.1% |
| Oakland, CA (special) | Apr 15, 2025 | Dem | Kevin Jenkins | 2025 (acting) | Incumbent retired. Democratic hold. | ▌ ✓ Barbara Lee (Democratic) 52.7%; ▌Loren Taylor (Democratic) 47.3% |
| Omaha, NE | Apr 1, 2025 (P); May 13, 2025 (G) | Rep | Jean Stothert | 2013; 2017; 2021 | Incumbent lost re-election. Democratic gain. | ▌ ✓ John Ewing Jr. (Democratic) 56.8%; ▌Jean Stothert (Republican) 42.9% |
| Pittsburgh, PA | May 20, 2025 (P); Nov 4, 2025 (G) | Dem | Ed Gainey | 2021 | Incumbent lost renomination. Democratic hold. | ▌ ✓ Corey O'Connor (Democratic) 85.6%; ▌Tony Moreno (Republican) 12.2% |
| Plano, TX | May 3, 2025 (G) | Rep | John Muns | 2021 | Incumbent re-elected. | ▌ ✓ John Muns (Republican) 100% |
| St. Louis, MO | Mar 4, 2025 (P); Apr 8, 2025 (G) | Dem | Tishaura Jones | 2021 | Incumbent lost re-election. Democratic hold. | ▌ ✓ Cara Spencer (Democratic) 64.2%; ▌Tishaura Jones (Democratic) 35.8% |
| Saint Paul, MN | Nov 4, 2025 | DFL | Melvin Carter | 2017; 2021 | Incumbent lost re-election. Democratic hold. | ▌ ✓ Kaohly Her (DFL) 51.5%; ▌Melvin Carter (DFL) 48.5% |
| San Antonio, TX | May 3, 2025 (G); June 7, 2025 (R) | Dem | Ron Nirenberg | 2017; 2019; 2021; 2023 | Incumbent term-limited. Democratic hold. | ▌ ✓ Gina Ortiz Jones (Democratic) 54.3%; ▌Rolando Pablos (Republican) 45.7% |
| Seattle, WA | Aug 5, 2025 (P); Nov 4, 2025 (G) | Dem | Bruce Harrell | 2021 | Incumbent lost re-election. Democratic hold. | ▌ ✓ Katie Wilson (Democratic) 50.2%; ▌Bruce Harrell (Democratic) 49.5% |
| Toledo, OH | Mar 7, 2025 (P); Nov 4, 2025 (G) | Dem | Wade Kapszukiewicz | 2017; 2021 | Incumbent re-elected. | ▌ ✓ Wade Kapszukiewicz (Democratic) 60.5%; ▌Roberto Torres (Independent) 32.3% |

=== Councils ===
| City | Date | Type | Last election | Seats up | Incumbents | | Elected | |
| City | Date | Type | Last election | Seats up | Party | Seats | Party | Seats |
|---|---|---|---|---|---|---|---|---|
| Anchorage, AK | Apr 1, 2025 | Nonpartisan | 2023 | 6 of 12 seats | Nonpartisan | 12 seats | Nonpartisan | 12 seats |
| Atlanta, GA | Nov 4, 2025 (general); Dec 2, 2025 (runoff) | Nonpartisan | 2023 | 16 seats | Nonpartisan | 16 seats | Nonpartisan | 16 seats |
| Aurora, CO | Nov 5, 2025 | Nonpartisan | 2023 | 5 of 10 seats | Nonpartisan | 10 seats | Nonpartisan | 10 seats |
| Boston, MA | Sep 9, 2025 (primary); Nov 4, 2025 (general) | Nonpartisan | 2023 | 13 seats | Democratic | 13 seats | Democratic | 13 seats |
| Charlotte, NC | Sep 9, 2025 (primary); Nov 4, 2025 (general) | Partisan | 2023 | 11 seats | Democratic | 9 seats | Democratic | 10 seats |
| Charlotte, NC | Sep 9, 2025 (primary); Nov 4, 2025 (general) | Partisan | 2023 | 11 seats | Republican | 2 seats | Republican | 1 seat |
| Cleveland, OH | Sep 9, 2025 (primary); Nov 4, 2025 (general) | Nonpartisan | 2021 | 15 seats | Democratic | 17 seats | Democratic | 15 seats |
| Colorado Springs, CO | Apr 1, 2025 | Nonpartisan | 2023 | 6 of 9 seats | Nonpartisan | 9 seats | Nonpartisan | 9 seats |
| Columbus, OH | May 6, 2025 (primary); Nov 4, 2025 (general) | Nonpartisan | 2023 | 4 of 9 seats | Democratic | 9 seats | Democratic | 9 seats |
| Fresno, CA (special) | Mar 18, 2025 | Nonpartisan | 2024 | 1 of 7 seats | Nonpartisan | 6 seats | Nonpartisan | 7 seats |
| Fresno, CA (special) | Mar 18, 2025 | Nonpartisan | 2024 | 1 of 7 seats | Vacant | 1 seat | Nonpartisan | 7 seats |
| Hialeah, FL | Nov 4, 2025 (primary); Nov 11, 2025 (general) | Nonpartisan | 2023 | 5 of 7 seats | Nonpartisan | 6 seats | Nonpartisan | 7 seats |
| Hialeah, FL | Nov 4, 2025 (primary); Nov 11, 2025 (general) | Nonpartisan | 2023 | 5 of 7 seats | Vacant | 1 seat | Nonpartisan | 7 seats |
| Irvine, CA (special) | Apr 15, 2025 | Nonpartisan | 2024 | 1 of 6 seats | Nonpartisan | 5 seats | Nonpartisan | 6 seats |
| Irvine, CA (special) | Apr 15, 2025 | Nonpartisan | 2024 | 1 of 6 seats | Vacant | 1 seat | Nonpartisan | 6 seats |
| Miami, FL | Nov 4, 2025 (general); Dec 9, 2025 (runoff) | Nonpartisan | 2023 | 2 of 5 seats | Nonpartisan | 5 seats | Nonpartisan | 5 seats |
| Minneapolis, MN | Nov 4, 2025 | Nonpartisan | 2023 | 13 seats | Democratic (DFL) | 12 seats | Democratic (DFL) | 12 seats |
| Minneapolis, MN | Nov 4, 2025 | Nonpartisan | 2023 | 13 seats | Independent socialist | 1 seat | Independent socialist | 1 seat |
| New Orleans, LA | Oct 11, 2025 (primary); Nov 4, 2025 (general) | Partisan | 2021 | 7 seats | Democratic | 7 seats | Democratic | 7 seats |
| New York, NY | Nov 4, 2025 | Partisan | 2023 | 51 seats | Democratic | 45 seats | Democratic | 46 seats |
| New York, NY | Nov 4, 2025 | Partisan | 2023 | 51 seats | Republican | 6 seats | Republican | 5 seats |
| Oakland, CA (special) | Apr 15, 2025 | Nonpartisan | 2024 | 1 of 8 seats | Democratic | 8 seats | Democratic | 8 seats |
| Oklahoma City, OK | Feb 11, 2025 (general); Apr 1, 2025 (runoff) | Nonpartisan | 2023 | 4 of 9 seats | Nonpartisan | 9 seats | Nonpartisan | 9 seats |
| Omaha, NE | Apr 1, 2025 (primary); May 13, 2025 (general) | Nonpartisan | 2021 | 7 seats | Democratic | 4 seats | Democratic | 4 seats |
| Omaha, NE | Apr 1, 2025 (primary); May 13, 2025 (general) | Nonpartisan | 2021 | 7 seats | Republican | 3 seats | Republican | 3 seats |
| Orlando, FL | Nov 4, 2025 (general); Dec 9, 2025 (runoff) | Nonpartisan | 2023 | 3 of 6 seats | Nonpartisan | 6 seats | Nonpartisan | 6 seats |
| Pittsburgh, PA | May 20, 2025 (primary); Nov 4, 2025 (general) | Partisan | 2023 | 4 of 9 seats | Democratic | 9 seats | Democratic | 9 seats |
| Seattle, WA | Nov 4, 2025 | Nonpartisan | 2023 | 3 of 10 seats | Democratic | 9 seats | Democratic | 10 seats |
| Seattle, WA | Nov 4, 2025 | Nonpartisan | 2023 | 3 of 10 seats | Vacant | 1 seat | Democratic | 10 seats |
| St. Louis, MO | Mar 4, 2025 (primary); Apr 8, 2025 (general) | Nonpartisan | 2023 | 7 of 15 seats | Democratic | 15 seats (Note: including the board president) | Democratic | 15 seats |
| San Jose, CA (special) | Apr 8, 2025 (general); Jun 24, 2025 (runoff) | Nonpartisan | 2024 | 1 of 11 seats (Note: including the mayor) | Democratic | 8 seats | Democratic | 8 seats |
| San Jose, CA (special) | Apr 8, 2025 (general); Jun 24, 2025 (runoff) | Nonpartisan | 2024 | 1 of 11 seats | Independent | 3 seats | Independent | 3 seats |
| Tucson, AZ | Aug 5, 2025 (primary); Nov 4, 2025 (general) | Partisan | 2023 | 3 of 7 seats | Democratic | 7 seats | Democratic | 7 seats |

== County election summary ==
=== Executives ===
| County | Incumbent | | | Status | Candidates |
| County | Party | Executive | Elected | Status | Candidates |
|---|---|---|---|---|---|
| Prince George's, MD (special) | Dem. | Tara Jackson | 2024 (acting) | Incumbent retired. Democratic hold. | ▌ ✓ Aisha Braveboy (Democratic) 91.2%; ▌ Jonathan White (Republican) 9.0% |
| Bronx, NY | Dem. | Vanessa Gibson | 2021 | Incumbent re-elected. | ▌▌ ✓ Vanessa Gibson (Democratic) 82.8%; ▌▌Grace Marrero (Republican) 17.2% |
| Kings, NY | Dem. | Antonio Reynoso | 2021 | Incumbent re-elected. | ▌▌ ✓ Antonio Reynoso (Democratic) 83.4%; ▌▌Janine Acquafredda (Republican) 16.6% |
| Nassau, NY | Rep. | Bruce Blakeman | 2021 | Incumbent re-elected. | ▌▌ ✓ Bruce Blakeman (Republican) 55.8%; ▌Seth Koslow (Democratic) 44.2% |
| New York, NY | Dem. | Mark Levine | 2021 | Incumbent retired to run for New York City Comptroller. Democratic hold. | ▌▌ ✓ Brad Hoylman-Sigal (Democratic) 81.1%; ▌Seson Adams (Republican) 17.0% |
| Orange, NY | Rep. | Steven Neuhaus | 2013 | Incumbent re-elected. | ▌▌ ✓ Steve Neuhaus (Republican) 60.2%; ▌▌Michael Sussman (Democratic) 39.8% |
| Queens, NY | Dem. | Donovan Richards | 2021 | Incumbent re-elected. | ▌ ✓ Donovan Richards (Democratic) 70.2%; ▌Henry Ikezi (Republican) 29.8% |
| Rensselaer, NY | Rep. | Steven McLaughlin | 2017; 2021 | Incumbent re-elected. | ▌▌ ✓ Steve McLaughlin (Republican) 54.0%; ▌▌Tiffani Silverman (Democratic) 46.0% |
| Richmond, NY | Rep. | Vito Fossella | 2021 | Incumbent re-elected. | ▌ ✓ Vito Fossella (Republican) 69.0%; ▌Michael Colombo (Democratic) 31.0% |
| Rockland, NY | Rep. | Ed Day | 2017; 2017; 2021 | Incumbent re-elected. | ▌▌ ✓ Ed Day (Republican) 74.3%; ▌Michael Parietti (Independent) 25.7% |
| Westchester, NY (special) | Dem. | George Latimer | 2017; 2021 | Incumbent retired to run for U.S. House. Democratic hold. | ▌ ✓ Ken Jenkins (Democratic) 63.6%; ▌Christine Schulti (Republican) 36.4% |
| Westchester, NY | Dem. | Ken Jenkins | 2025 (special) | Incumbent re-elected. | ▌ ✓ Ken Jenkins (Democratic) 67.6%; ▌Christine Schulti (Republican) 32.4% |
| King, WA | Dem. | Dow Constantine | 2009 | Incumbent retired. Democratic hold. | ▌ ✓ Girmay Zahilay (Democratic) 53.3%; ▌Claudia Balducci (Democratic) 45.5% |

=== County legislatures ===
| County | Date | Type | Last election | Seats up | Incumbents | | Elected | |
| County | Date | Type | Last election | Seats up | Party | Seats | Party | Seats |
|---|---|---|---|---|---|---|---|---|
| Erie, NY | June 24, 2025 (primary); Nov 4, 2025 (general) | Partisan | 2023 | 11 seats | Democratic | 7 seats | Democratic | 7 seats |
| Erie, NY | June 24, 2025 (primary); Nov 4, 2025 (general) | Partisan | 2023 | 11 seats | Republican | 4 seats | Republican | 4 seats |
| King, WA | Aug 5, 2025 (primary); Nov 4, 2025 (general) | Nonpartisan | 2023 | 5 of 9 seats | Democratic | 7 seats | Democratic | 7 seats |
| King, WA | Aug 5, 2025 (primary); Nov 4, 2025 (general) | Nonpartisan | 2023 | 5 of 9 seats | Republican | 2 seats | Republican | 2 seats |
| Luzerne, PA | May 20, 2025 (primary); Nov 4, 2025 (general) | Partisan | 2023 | 5 of 11 seats | Republican | 7 seats | Democratic | 8 seats |
| Luzerne, PA | May 20, 2025 (primary); Nov 4, 2025 (general) | Partisan | 2023 | 5 of 11 seats | Democratic | 4 seats | Republican | 3 seats |
| Monroe, NY | June 24, 2025 (primary); Nov 4, 2025 (general) | Partisan | 2023 | 2 of 29 seats | Democratic | 16 seats | Democratic | 18 seats |
| Monroe, NY | June 24, 2025 (primary); Nov 4, 2025 (general) | Partisan | 2023 | 2 of 29 seats | Republican | 13 seats | Republican | 11 seats |
| Nassau, NY | June 24, 2025 (primary); Nov 4, 2025 (general) | Partisan | 2023 | 19 seats | Republican | 12 seats | Republican | 11 seats |
| Nassau, NY | June 24, 2025 (primary); Nov 4, 2025 (general) | Partisan | 2023 | 19 seats | Democratic | 7 seats | Democratic | 8 seats |
| Oklahoma, OK (special) | Feb 11, 2025 (primary); Apr 1, 2025 (general) | Partisan | 2024 | 1 of 3 seats | Republican | 2 seats | Republican | 2 seats |
| Oklahoma, OK (special) | Feb 11, 2025 (primary); Apr 1, 2025 (general) | Partisan | 2024 | 1 of 3 seats | Vacant | 1 seat | Democratic | 1 seat |
| San Diego, CA (special) | Apr 8, 2025 (primary); Jul 1, 2025 (general) | Nonpartisan | 2024 | 1 of 5 seats | Democratic | 2 seats | Democratic | 3 seats |
| San Diego, CA (special) | Apr 8, 2025 (primary); Jul 1, 2025 (general) | Nonpartisan | 2024 | 1 of 5 seats | Republican | 2 seats | Republican | 2 seats |
| San Diego, CA (special) | Apr 8, 2025 (primary); Jul 1, 2025 (general) | Nonpartisan | 2024 | 1 of 5 seats | Vacant | 1 seat | Vacant | 0 seats |
| Suffolk, NY | June 24, 2025 (primary); Nov 4, 2025 (general) | Partisan | 2023 | 18 seats | Republican | 10 seats | Republican | 9 seats |
| Suffolk, NY | June 24, 2025 (primary); Nov 4, 2025 (general) | Partisan | 2023 | 18 seats | Democratic | 6 seats | Democratic | 7 seats |
| Suffolk, NY | June 24, 2025 (primary); Nov 4, 2025 (general) | Partisan | 2023 | 18 seats | Conservative | 2 seats | Conservative | 2 seats |
| Westchester, NY | June 24, 2025 (primary); Nov 4, 2025 (general) | Partisan | 2023 | 17 seats | Democratic | 15 seats | Democratic | 15 seats |
| Westchester, NY | June 24, 2025 (primary); Nov 4, 2025 (general) | Partisan | 2023 | 17 seats | Conservative | 1 seat | Conservative | 1 seat |
| Westchester, NY | June 24, 2025 (primary); Nov 4, 2025 (general) | Partisan | 2023 | 17 seats | Republican | 1 seat | Republican | 1 seat |

=== Sheriffs ===
| County | Incumbent | | | Notes | Candidates |
| County | Party | Sheriff | Elected | Notes | Candidates |
|---|---|---|---|---|---|
| Erie, NY | Rep. | John C. Garcia | 2021 | Incumbent re-elected. | ▌ ✓ John C. Garcia (Republican) 94.8%; ▌Write-ins 5.2% |
| Suffolk, NY | Dem. | Errol D. Toulon Jr. | 2017; 2021 | Incumbent re-elected. | ▌ ✓ Errol D. Toulon Jr. (Democratic) 99.7%; ▌Write-ins 0.3% |

== List of elections by state ==
Due to the large quantity of populated places throughout the United States, only the top 100 cities were listed previously on the page.

- Alabama (details)
  - Birmingham – August 26
  - Dothan – August 5
  - Mobile – August 26
  - Tuscaloosa – March 4
  - Other municipalities – August 26
- Alaska
  - Anchorage (city council, ballot measures) – April 1
  - Fairbanks - October 7
- Arizona
  - Tucson – March 11
- California
  - Redondo Beach Mayoral and City Council and Redondo Beach Unified School District Board of Education - March 4
  - Oakland (special) – April 15
  - San Francisco (Joel Engardio recall) – September 16
- Colorado
  - Aspen – March 4
- Connecticut
  - Stamford (mayor) – November 4
- Florida
  - Hialeah – Nov. 4, TBD
  - Miami – Nov. 4, Nov. 18
- District of Columbia
  - Washington, D.C. (council sp) – July 15
- Georgia (U.S. state)
  - Atlanta – November 4
  - Centerville (sp.) – Mar. 18, Apr. 15
  - Sandy Springs – November 4
- Illinois
  - Aurora – April 1
  - Bloomington – April 1
  - Calumet City – Feb. 25, Apr. 1
- Iowa
  - Cedar Rapids – November 4
- Louisiana
  - New Orleans – Oct. 11, Nov. 15
- Maryland
  - Annapolis – November 4
  - Prince George's County (executive sp) – June 3
- Massachusetts
  - Boston – November 4
- Michigan
  - Dearborn Heights – Aug. 5, Nov. 4
  - Detroit – November 4
  - Lansing – November 4
- Minnesota
  - Minneapolis – November 4
    - Mayor, council
  - Saint Paul – November 4
  - Bloomington – November 4
- Mississippi (details) – Apr. 1, Apr. 22, Jun. 3
  - Biloxi
  - Gulfport
  - Hattiesburg
  - Jackson
  - Madison
  - Meridian
  - Olive Branch
  - Philadelphia
  - Southaven
  - Tupelo
- Missouri
  - Columbia – Apr. 8
  - Springfield – Apr. 8
  - St. Louis – Mar. 4, Apr. 8
- Montana
  - Billings – Sep. 9, Nov. 5
  - Bozeman – Sep. 9, Nov. 5
  - Great Falls – Sep. 9, Nov. 5
  - Helena – Sep. 9, Nov. 5
  - Kalispell – Sep. 9, Nov. 5
  - Missoula – Sep. 9, Nov. 5
- Nebraska
  - Omaha – Apr. 1, May 13
  - Mayor, city council
- New Jersey
  - Atlantic City – November 4
  - Hoboken – November 4
  - Jersey City – November 4
- New Mexico
  - Albuquerque – November 4
  - Santa Fe – November 4
- New York
  - Albany – Jun. 24, Nov. 4
  - Binghamton – Jun. 24, Nov. 4
  - Buffalo – Jun. 24, Nov. 4
  - New York – Jun. 24, Nov. 4
    - Mayor, borough presidents, comptroller, council, public advocate
  - Syracuse – Jun. 24, Nov. 4
  - Westchester County (executive sp) – February 11
- North Carolina
  - Charlotte – Sep. 9, Nov. 4
  - Durham – Oct. 7, Nov. 4
  - Greensboro
- Ohio
  - Cleveland – Nov. 4
  - Cincinnati – Nov. 4
  - Toledo – Nov. 4
- Oklahoma (details)
  - Norman – February 11
  - Oklahoma City – Feb. 11, Apr. 1
  - Oklahoma County – Feb. 11, Apr. 1
- Pennsylvania
  - Allegheny County – November 4
  - Bucks County – November 4
  - Delaware County – November 4
  - Luzerne County (council) – November 4
  - Allentown (mayor) – November 4
  - Harrisburg (mayor) – November 4
  - Philadelphia – November 4
  - Pittsburgh – November 4
    - Mayor, city council, school board
  - Scranton (mayor) – November 4
- South Carolina
  - Columbia – November 4
- Tennessee
  - Chattanooga – March 4
- Texas
  - Garland (mayor) – May 3
  - Fort Worth (mayor) – May 3
  - Plano – May 3
    - Mayor, city council
  - San Antonio (mayor) – May 3
- Washington
  - Seattle – Aug. 3, Nov. 4
    - Mayor, city attorney
  - King County (executive) – Aug. 3, Nov. 4
- Wisconsin
  - Dane County (executive) – April 1
  - Winnebago County (executive) – April 1
