= 2025 Toledo, Ohio mayoral election =

2025 Toledo mayoral election
- November 4, 2025
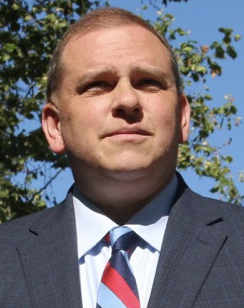

Candidate	Wade Kapszukiewicz	Roberto Torres
Party	Nonpartisan	Nonpartisan
Alliance	Democratic	Independent
Popular vote	18,948	10,102
Percentage	60.52%	32.27%
Mayor before election
Wade Kapszukiewicz
Democratic
Elected mayor
Wade Kapszukiewicz
Democratic

The 2025 Toledo mayoral election was held on Tuesday, November 4, 2025 to elect the mayor of Toledo, Ohio. The non-partisan primary election was held on May 6, 2025. Incumbent mayor Wade Kapszukiewicz won a third term.

== Background ==
Incumbent mayor Wade Kapszukiewicz, was re-elected as mayor in 2021, after defeating Carty Finkbeiner, who ran as an Independent.

On November 5, 2024, voters in Toledo approved changes to term limits, allowing mayors to serve up to three terms.

== Primary election ==
=== Candidates ===
==== Advanced to general ====
- Wade Kapszukiewicz (Democrat), incumbent mayor
- Roberto Torres (Independent), former at-large member of Toledo Public Schools Board of Education (2005–2008), former director of Detroit mayor Mike Duggan's Office of Immigrant Affairs and Economic Inclusion (2018–2024), and veteran

==== Eliminated in primary ====
- Harold Harris (Independent), community leader and veteran

==== Disqualified ====
- Shawn Mahone (Independent), youth organization leader

=== Endorsements ===
Wade Kapszukiewicz

Labor unions

- SEIU Local 1

Organizations

- Ohio Environmental Council Action Fund

Party chapters

- Lucas County Democratic Party

Newspapers

- Toledo Blade

=== Results ===
2025 Toledo mayoral primary election
Party	Candidate	Votes	%
Nonpartisan	Wade Kapszukiewicz (incumbent)	6,975	53.11%
Nonpartisan	Roberto Torres	3,204	24.40%
Nonpartisan	Harold Harris	2,842	21.64%
Write-in		112	0.85%
Total votes		13,133	100.0%

== General election ==
=== Endorsements ===
Wade Kapszukiewicz

Labor unions

- Toledo Police Patrolman’s Association
Roberto Torres

Labor unions

- International Association of Fire Fighters Local 92

Organizations

- New American Leaders Action Fund
- CAIR Action Midwest

Party chapters

- Lucas County Libertarian Party

=== Results ===
2025 Toledo mayoral runoff
Party	Candidate	Votes	%
Nonpartisan	Wade Kapszukiewicz (incumbent)	18,948	60.52%
Nonpartisan	Roberto Torres	10,102	32.27%
Write-in		2,258	7.21%
Total votes		31,308	100.0%
