= 2025 Hialeah mayoral election =

Local election in Florida, US

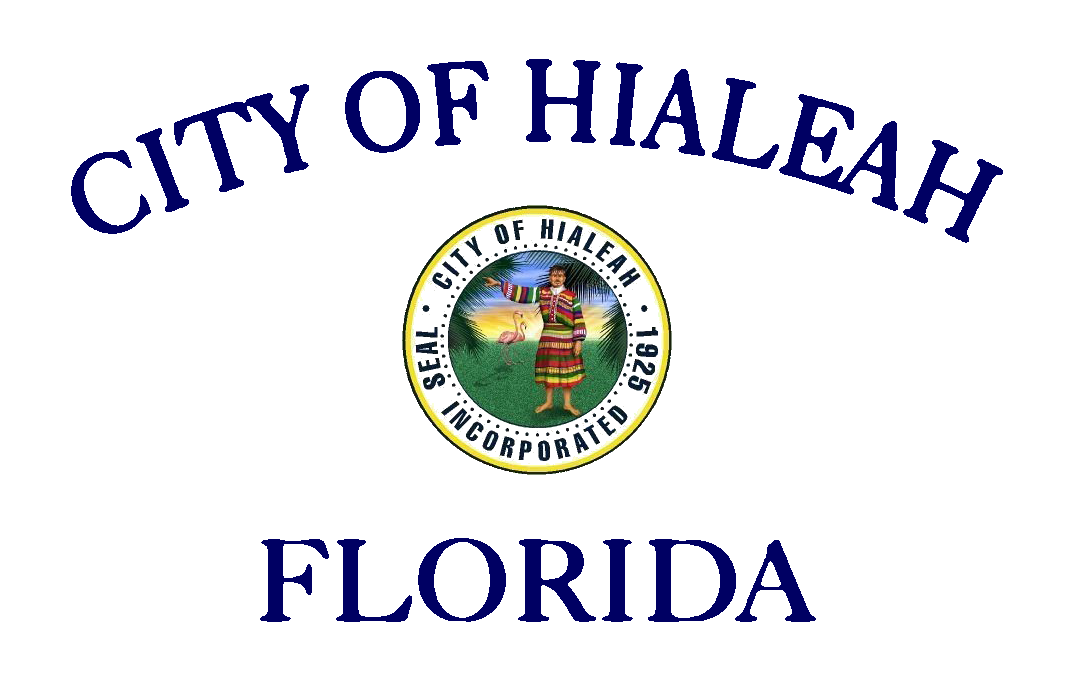
- November 4, 2025
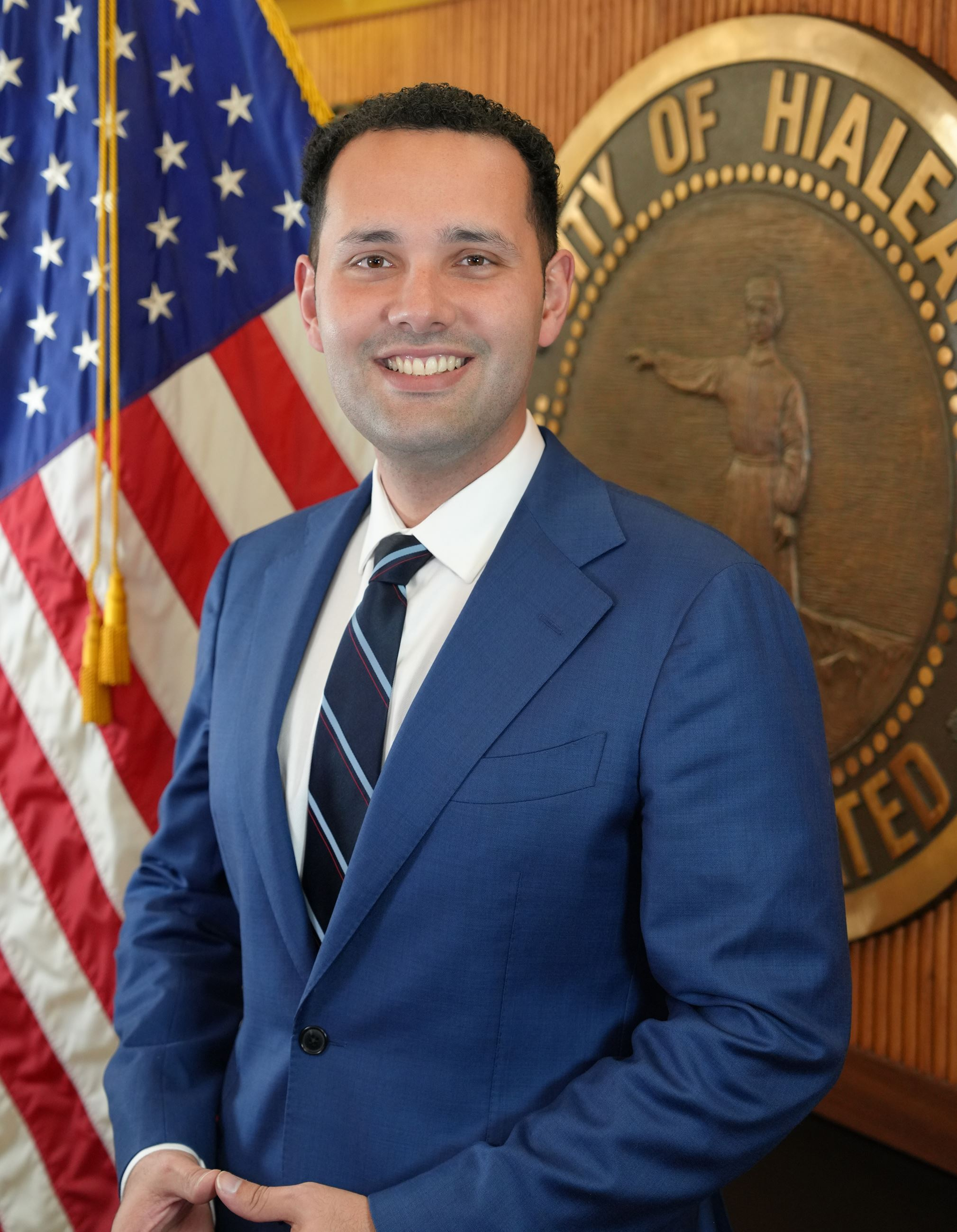

Candidate	Bryan Calvo	Jesus Tundidor
Party	Nonpartisan	Nonpartisan
Alliance	Republican	Republican
Popular vote	9,232	3,606
Percentage	52.93%	20.68%
Candidate	Jackie Garcia-Roves	Marc Salvat
Party	Nonpartisan	Nonpartisan
Alliance	Republican	Republican
Popular vote	3,325	1,128
Percentage	19.06%	6.47%
- Precinct results Calvo: 30–40% 40–50% 50–60% 60–70%
Mayor before election
Jacqueline Garcia-Roves (interim)
Nonpartisan
Elected mayor
Bryan Calvo
Nonpartisan

Mayoral elections were held in Hialeah, Florida on November 4, 2025, with a runoff election on December 9, 2025 if no candidate received a majority. Interim Mayor Jacqueline Garcia-Roves, who became mayor upon the resignation of Esteban Bovo, was running for re-election. The election was won by Bryan Calvo, 27-years-old at the time of the election, in what the Miami Herald called a 'surprise result'. He won with 52.9% of the vote, avoiding a runoff.

== Candidates ==
=== Declared ===
- Bryan Calvo, former city councilor (Republican)
- Jacqueline Garcia-Roves, interim mayor (Republican)
- Bernandino Norberto Rodriguez
- Marc Anthony Salvat, real estate investor (Republican)
- Jesus Tundidor, city councilor (Republican)

=== Withdrawn ===
- René García, county commissioner and former state senator (endorsed Garcia-Roves)
- Daniel Cornejo

=== Disqualified ===
- Manuel Reyes

== Endorsements ==
Jesus Tundidor

State legislators

- Anthony Rodriguez, Miami-Dade county chairman from the 10th district (2022–present) and former state representative from the 118th district (2018–2022)
- David Borrero, state representative from the 111th district (2022–present) and 105th district (2020–2022)

County officials

- Raquel Regalado, Miami-Dade county commissioner from the 6th district (2020–present)

Local officials

- Melinda de la Vega, city councilmember (2024–present)
- Monica Perez, city councilmember (2019–present)
- Christi Fraga, mayor of Doral (2022–present)
- Josh Dieguez, mayor of Miami Lakes (2024–present)
- Bryan Morera, vice-mayor of Miami Lakes (2024–present)

Labor unions

- International Association of Firefighters Local 1102
- Fraternal Order of Police Hialeah Lodge 12
- South Florida Police Benevolent Association
- AFSCME Florida
Bryan Calvo

Individuals

- ~~Félix Rodríguez, former CIA officer~~
Jacqueline Garcia-Roves

State legislators

- René García, Miami-Dade county commissioner from the 13th district (2020–present), former state senator (Note: García represented the 40th district (2010–2012), the 38th district (2012–2016) and the 36th district (2016–2018).) and former state representative from the 110th district (2000–2008)

== Results ==
Calvo handily won the election, surpassing 50% of the vote and carrying every precinct in the city. He performed the best in precinct #378, securing 63.9% of the vote; conversely, he earned his worst result in the neighboring precinct #377, at 39.5% of the vote.

2025 Hialeah mayoral election
Candidate	Votes	%
Bryan Calvo	9,232	52.93%
Jesus Tundidor	3,606	20.68%
Jacqueline Garcia-Roves (incumbent)	3,325	19.06%
Marc Anthony Salvat	1,128	6.47%
Benny Rodriguez	150	0.86%
Total votes	17,441	100.00
