= 2017 Toledo, Ohio mayoral election =

- November 7, 2017
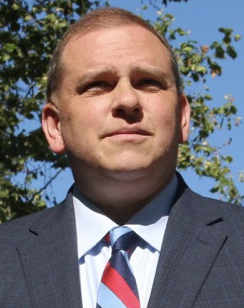

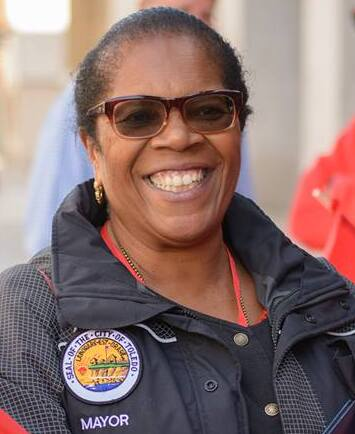
Candidate	Wade Kapszukiewicz	Paula Hicks-Hudson
Party	Democratic	Democratic
Popular vote	28,546	22,930
Percentage	55.45%	44.55%
Mayor before election
Paula Hicks-Hudson
Democratic
Elected mayor
Wade Kapszukiewicz
Democratic

Toledo, Ohio, held an election for mayor on November 7, 2017. The election was officially nonpartisan, with the top two candidates from the September 12 primary election advancing to the general election, regardless of party. Incumbent Democratic Mayor Paula Hicks-Hudson lost reelection to Lucas County Treasurer Wade Kapszukiewicz.

== Primary election ==
=== Candidates ===
- Opal Covey, perennial candidate
- Paula Hicks-Hudson, incumbent Mayor of Toledo
- Wade Kapszukiewicz, Treasurer of Lucas County
- Tom Waniewski, city councilor

=== Results ===
Primary election results
Party	Candidate	Votes	%
Democratic	Paula Hicks-Hudson (incumbent)	9,912	39.22
Democratic	Wade Kapszukiewicz	8,432	33.36
Republican	Tom Waniewski	6,722	26.60
Republican	Opal Covey	207	0.82
Total votes		25,273	100

== General election ==
=== Candidates ===
- Paula Hicks-Hudson, incumbent Mayor of Toledo
- Wade Kapszukiewicz, Treasurer of Lucas County

=== Results ===
2017 Toledo mayoral election
Party	Candidate	Votes	%
Democratic	Wade Kapszukiewicz	28,546	55.45
Democratic	Paula Hicks-Hudson (incumbent)	22,930	44.55
Total votes		51,476	100
