= 2025 Omaha City Council election =

Election in Omaha, Nebraska

- May 13, 2025; Officially nonpartisan

All 7 seats on the Omaha City Council 4 seats needed for a majority
	Majority party	Minority party	Third party
Leader	Pete Festersen	Aimee; Melton	None
Party	Democratic	Republican	Independent
Leader's seat	District 1	District 7	None
Last election	4	3	0
Seats won	4	3	0
Seat change	Steady	Steady	Steady
Popular vote	30,038	25,165	4,170
Percentage	49.57%	41.53%	6.88%
President before election
Pete Festersen
Democratic
Elected President
Pete Festersen
Democratic

The 2025 Omaha City Council election occurred in the city of Omaha, Nebraska, United States on May 13, 2025. The Omaha City Council is made up of 7 members representing different parts of the city. Members elected in 2025 will serve four-year terms. Council members will be elected alongside the mayor and other municipal offices. Primary elections were held on April 1. Municipal elections in Omaha are officially non-partisan.

== Incumbent status ==
After speculation that he may run for mayor, council president Pete Festersen declared running for re-election for his district on Cotber 15, 2024.

District	Name	Entered office	Running
1	Pete Festersen	June 2009	Yes
2	Juanita Johnson	June 2021	Yes
3	Danny Begley	June 2021	Yes
4	Ron Hug	September 2023	Yes
5	Don Rowe	June 2021	Yes
6	Brinker Harding	June 2013	Yes
7	Aimee Melton	June 2013	Yes

== Race by district ==
- Note: All elections are technically non-partisan in the State Legislature; therefore, parties listed here are from candidates' websites and official party endorsement lists. Candidates all appear on the ballot as nonpartisan.
  - Candidates endorsed by the Republican Party:
  - Candidates endorsed by the Democratic Party:

=== District 1 ===
The incumbent was Democratic Pete Festersen, Incumbent running. Incumbent is Democrat and council president Pete Festersen, who was elected with 61.0% of the vote in 2021.

=== Candidates ===
==== Declared ====
- Pete Festersen, incumbent, president of the Omaha City Council and candidate for Nebraska's 2nd congressional district in 2014 (Party preference: Democratic)
- Mark Brannen, local advocate (Party preference: Independent)

=== Results ===
2025 Omaha City Council District 1 election
Primary election
Candidate	Votes	%
Pete Festersen (incumbent)	7,176	65.94%
Mark Brannen	3,637	33.42%
Write-in	69	0.64%
Total votes	10,882	100.00%
General election
Pete Festersen (incumbent)	10,615	70.15%
Mark Brannen	4,517	29.85%
Total votes	15,132	100.00%

=== District 2 ===
The incumbent was Democratic Juanita Johnson, who was elected with 56.4% of the vote in 2021.

=== Candidates ===
==== Declared ====
- LaVonya Goodwin, community organizer (Party preference: Democratic)
- Juanita Johnson, incumbent (Party preference: Democratic)
- Maurice Jones, (Party preference: Democratic)
- Mike Lee Jr., community organizer (Party preference: Democratic)
- Ben Gray, former City Councilmember of this district (Party preference: Democratic)
- William King, community advocate (Party preference: Democratic)
- Cheryl Weston, community organizer (Party preference: Independent)
- Anthony Rogers-Wright, climate change activist (Party preference: Independent)
- Tyrone Eure, former security supervisor and counselor (Party preference: Democratic)

==== Withdrawn ====
- Peyton Zyla, community organizer (Party preference: Democratic)

=== Results ===
2025 Omaha City Council District 2 election
Primary election
Candidate	Votes	%
Ben Gray	1,720	27.45%
LaVonya Goodwin	1,001	15.97%
Juanita Johnson (incumbent)	974	15.54%
Maurice Jones	937	14.95%
Mike Lee Jr.	539	8.60%
William King	457	7.29%
Cheryl Weston	336	5.36%
Anthony Rogers-Wright	197	3.14%
Tyrone Eure	106	1.69%
Total votes	6,267	100.00%
General election
LaVonya Goodwin	5,207	59.41%
Ben Gray	3,557	40.59%
Total votes	8,764	100.00%

=== District 3 ===
The incumbent was Democratic Danny Begley, Incumbent running. Incumbent is Democrat Danny Begley, who was elected with 51.7% of the vote in 2021.

=== Candidates ===
==== Declared ====
- Danny Begley, incumbent (Party preference: Democratic)
- Michael Pilypaitis, business analyst (Party preference: Democratic)

=== Results ===
2025 Omaha City Council District 3 election
Primary election
Candidate	Votes	%
Danny Begley (incumbent)	5,977	70.19%
Michael Pilypaitis	2,462	28.91%
Write-in	77	0.90%
Total votes	8,516	100.00%
General election
Danny Begley (incumbent)	7,729	64.31%
Michael Pilypaitis	4,290	35.69%
Total votes	12,019	100.00%

=== District 4 ===
The incumbent was Democratic Ron Hug, Incumbent running. Incumbent is Democrat Vinny Palermo, who was elected with 60.9% of the vote in 2021. August 1, 2023, Omaha City Council votes to kick jailed Vinny Palermo off the council, 6–0, and appoint Ron Hug.

=== Candidates ===
==== Declared ====
- Andrew Adams, Union Pacific employee (Party preference: Democratic)
- Ron Hug, incumbent, appointed by city council (Party preference: Democratic)
- Jonathan Renteria, community organizer (Party preference: Democratic)
- Gilbert Ayala, retail worker (Party preference: Republican)

=== Results ===
2025 Omaha City Council District 4 election
Primary election
Candidate	Votes	%
Ron Hug (incumbent)	2,697	46.63%
Andrew Adams	1,223	21.14%
Gilbert Ayala	1,162	20.09%
Jonathan Renteria	702	12.14%
Total votes	5,784	100.00%
General election
Ron Hug (incumbent)	4,148	61.04%
Andrew Adams	2,647	38.96%
Total votes	6,795	100.00%

=== District 5 ===
The incumbent was Republican Don Rowe, Incumbent running. Incumbent is Republican Don Rowe, who was elected with 52.9% of the vote in 2021.

=== Candidates ===
==== Declared ====
- Don Rowe, incumbent (Party preference: Republican)

=== Results ===
2025 Omaha City Council District 5 election
Primary election
Candidate	Votes	%
Don Rowe (incumbent)	7,484	95.67%
Write-in	339	4.33%
Total votes	7,823	100.00%
General election
Don Rowe (incumbent)	10,889	100.00%
Total votes	10,889	100.00%

=== District 6 ===
The incumbent was Republican Brinker Harding, Incumbent running. Incumbent is Republican Brinker Harding, who was elected with 63.1% of the vote in 2021.

=== Candidates ===
==== Declared ====
- Brinker Harding, incumbent (Party preference: Republican)

=== Results ===
2025 Omaha City Council District 6 election
Primary election
Candidate	Votes	%
Brinker Harding (incumbent)	9,752	93.39%
Write-in	690	6.61%
Total votes	10,442	100.00%
General election
Brinker Harding (incumbent)	13,545	100.00%
Total votes	13,545	100.00%

=== District 7 ===
The incumbent was Republican Aimee Melton, Incumbent running. Incumbent is Republican Aimee Melton, who was elected with 51.2% of the vote in 2021.

=== Candidates ===
==== Declared ====
- Aimee Melton, incumbent, vice president of the Omaha City Council (Party preference: Republican)
- Tim Carter, consultant (Party preference: Democratic)

=== Results ===
2025 Omaha City Council District 7 election
Primary election
Candidate	Votes	%
Aimee Melton (incumbent)	6,767	62.20%
Tim Carter	4,067	37.38%
Write-in	46	0.52%
Total votes	10,880	100.00%
General election
Aimee Melton (incumbent)	8,488	54.21%
Tim Carter	7,169	45.79%
Total votes	15,657	100.00%

== See also ==
- 2025 United States local elections
