= 2025 Alabama local elections =

- March 4 — August 26, 2025
- Cities over 30,000 with municipal elections. Click on a city name to skip to that city's section.

Alabama held elections in most of its various municipalities throughout 2025. The vast majority of municipalities throughout the state held their general elections on August 26, 2025, after an act of the Alabama Legislature in 2021 moved local election dates from the presidential year to the year after.

== List of elections ==
The following cities over 30,000 are scheduled to hold municipal elections in 2025:

- Alabaster – August 26
- Birmingham – August 26
  - Mayor
- Decatur – August 26
- Dothan – August 5
- Florence – August 26
- Hoover – August 26
  - Mayor
- Madison – August 26
- Mobile – Aug. 26 (general), Sep. 23 (runoff)
  - Mayor
- Northport – August 26
- Opelika – August 26
- Phenix City – August 26
- Prattville – August 26
- Tuscaloosa – March 4
  - Mayor
- Vestavia – August 26

== Birmingham ==
2025 Birmingham mayoral election
- August 26, 2025
Party	Nonpartisan
Incumbent Mayor
Randall Woodfin
Democratic

Two-term Democratic mayor Randall Woodfin was re-elected with 64.3% of the vote in 2021. Woodfin is running for a third term. Activist Kamau Afrika and state representative Juandalynn Givan have also declared their candidacies.

The general election is scheduled for August 26.

== Dothan ==
Mark Saliba was re-elected to a third consecutive term on August 5.

2025 Dothan mayoral election
Party	Candidate	Votes	%
Nonpartisan	Mark Saliba (inc.)	6,158	81.38%
Nonpartisan	Jimmy McCray	1,409	18.62%
Total votes		7,567	100.00%
Registered electors		52,722	
Turnout		7,638	14.49%

== Opelika ==
=== Candidates ===
- Raven Harvis
- Eddie Smith, city council president

=== Results ===
Eddie Smith was elected.

== Hoover ==
2025 Hoover mayoral election
- August 26, 2025
Party	Nonpartisan
Incumbent Mayor
Frank Brocato
Republican

Two-term Republican mayor Frank Brocato was re-elected with 76.0% of the vote in 2020. Brocato is running for a third term.

The general election is scheduled for August 26 with a runoff on September 23, if necessary. July 24 is the last day candidates can qualify for the ballot. Elections in most municipalities, including Hoover, were moved from presidential election years to the year after by the Alabama Legislature in 2021.

== Mobile ==
2025 Mobile mayoral election
- August 26, 2025
Party	Nonpartisan
Incumbent Mayor
Sandy Stimpson
Republican

Three-term Republican mayor Sandy Stimpson was re-elected with 62.5% of the vote in 2021. Stimpson will not run for a fourth term. Connie Hudson and Spiro Cheriogotis have both declared their candidacies. Another candidate, Stephen Nodine, has also stated his intention to run, but his criminal convictions may make him ineligible for the office.

The general election is scheduled for August 26 with a runoff on September 23, if necessary. July 15 is the last day candidates can qualify for the ballot.

City Council elections are also being held. 2025 Mobile Alabama City Council election

== Tuscaloosa ==
2025 Tuscaloosa mayoral election
- March 4, 2025
- Turnout: 11.4% (unofficial)
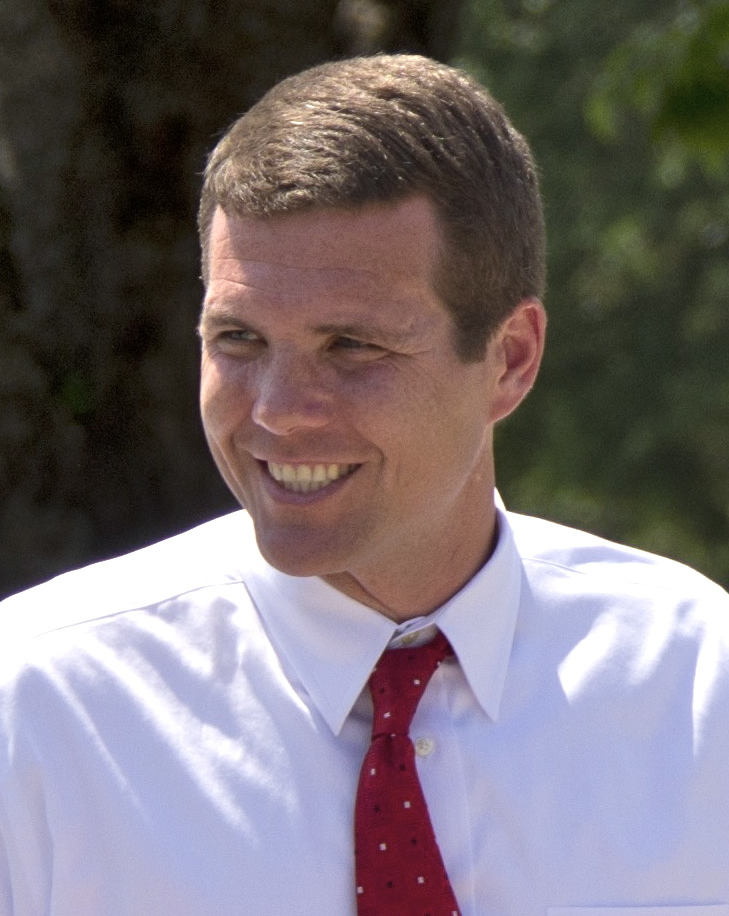

Nominee	Walt Maddox	Denson Ferrell II
Party	Nonpartisan	Nonpartisan
Alliance	Democratic
Popular vote	5,727	859
Percentage	86.96%	13.04%
Mayor before election
Walt Maddox
Democratic
Elected Mayor
Walt Maddox
Democratic

Five-term Democratic mayor Walt Maddox was re-elected with 56.6 percent of the vote in 2021. Maddox won re-election to a sixth term with 87 percent of the vote. Walt Maddox won re-election with 87 percent of the vote. Political newcomer Denson Ferrell II was his only challenger on the ballot.

The general election took place on March 4. A runoff was scheduled for April 1, but was unnecessary as there were only two candidates. Candidate qualification closed on January 28.

2025 Tuscaloosa mayoral election (unofficial results)
Party	Candidate	Votes	%
Nonpartisan	Walt Maddox (inc.)	5,727	86.96%
Nonpartisan	Denson Ferrell II	859	13.04%
Total votes		6,586	100.00%
Democratic hold			
