= 2017 Westchester County Board of Legislators elections =

2017 Westchester County Board of Legislators election
- November 7, 2017

All 17 seats on the Westchester County Board of Legislators
| | Majority party | Minority party | Third party |
|---|---|---|---|
| Party | Democratic | Republican | Conservative |
| Last election | 9 | 7 | 1 |
| Seats won | 12 | 4 | 1 |
| Seat change | ▲3 | ▼3 | Steady |
| Popular vote | 123,701 | 55,310 | 8,117 |
| Percentage | 65.39% | 29.24% | 4.29% |
| Swing | ▲6.71% | ▼6.81% | ▲0.11% |

The 2017 Westchester County Board of Legislators elections were held on 7 November 2017 in conjunction with the 2017 Westchester County Executive election. The elections resulted in major gains for the Democratic Party with the party flipping three previously Republican seats and control of the County Legislature from a Republican led Coalition. Benjamin Boykin became chair of the board and Catherine Parker Majority leader. Lohud attributed the major Democratic gains in heavily Democratic Westchester County as a reaction to the election of Donald Trump at the 2016 United States presidential election. The Democratic vote increased 6.71% as compared with the 2015 board of legislator elections. Democrats gained one seat they had previously left uncontested, the Peekskill based District 1 in addition to winning Districts 2 and 10 with their vote share increasing 8.13% and 5.48% respectively.

== Electoral System ==
Members of the Board of Legislators are elected every two years during the off-year elections. Elections are conducted using first-past-the-post in 17 single member districts. Like all partisan elections in New York, fusion tickets are used.

== Results ==
2017 Westchester County Board of Legislators Election Results
| Party | Candidates | Votes | % | % +/– | Seats | Seats +/– |
|---|---|---|---|---|---|---|
| **Democratic** | **16** | **123,701** | **65.39%** | **▲6.71%** | **12** | **▲3** |
| Republican | 9 | 55,310 | 29.24% | ▼6.81% | 4 | ▼3 |
| Conservative | 1 | 8,117 | 4.29% | ▲0.11% | 1 | Steady |
| Independence | 1 | 1,017 | 0.54% | New | 0 | New |
| Working Families | 1 | 650 | 0.34% | New | 0 | New |
| Write-in | N/A | 380 | 0.20% | ▼0.17% | 0 | 0 |
| Valid votes | 28 | 189,175 | 84.12% | ▲4.92% | 17 | Steady |
| Blank votes | – | 35,724 | 15.88% | ▼4.92% | – | – |
| Registered voters/Turnout | – | **598,126** | **37.6%** | **▲14.4%** | – | – |
Source: Westchester County Board of Elections results

*Results are added up for the party each candidate is a member of, not fusion tickets.

Popular vote
| **Democratic** | 65.39% |
| Republican | 29.24% |
| Other | 5.37% |

=== By district ===
BOLD represents a flip and ITALICS represent a new legislator of the same party.

| District | Incumbent | Party | +/- D% | Elected Legislator | Party |
|---|---|---|---|---|---|
| 1 | John G. Testa | Rep | +43.86% | John G. Testa | Rep |
| 2 | Francis T. Corcoran | Rep | +8.13% | **Kitley Covill** | **Dem** |
| 3 | Margaret A. Cunzio | Con | +0.88% | Margaret A. Cunzio | Con |
| 4 | Michael B. Kaplowitz | Dem | –0.01% | Michael B. Kaplowitz | Dem |
| 5 | Benjamin Boykin II | Dem | +0.45% | Benjamin Boykin II | Dem |
| 6 | David B. Gelfarb | Rep | +53.03% | **Nancy E. Barr** | **Dem** |
| 7 | Catherine F. Parker | Dem | +7.04% | Catherine F. Parker | Dem |
| 8 | Alfreda A. Williams | Dem | +0.27% | Alfreda A. Williams | Dem |
| 9 | Catherine A. Borgia | Dem | –1.72% | Catherine A. Borgia | Dem |
| 10 | Sheila M. Marcotte | Rep | +5.48% | **Damon R. Mather** | **Dem** |
| 11 | James Maisano | Rep | N/A | James Maisano | Rep |
| 12 | MaryJane C. Shimsky | Dem | +0.06% | MaryJane C. Shimsky | Dem |
| 13 | Lyndon D. Williams | Dem | +0.09% | Lyndon D. Williams | Dem |
| 14 | Bernice Spreckman | Rep | –0.32% | David J. Tubiolo | Rep |
| 15 | Gordon A. Burrows | Rep | +6.58% | Gordon A. Burrows | Rep |
| 16 | Ken Jenkins | Dem | –15.34% | Christopher A. Johnson | Dem |
| 17 | Jose I. Alvadrado | Dem | +5.19% | Jose I. Alvadrado | Dem |

=== Close races ===
Districts where the margin of victory was under 10%:

1. **District 6, 6.10% (gain)**
2. **District 10, 6.14% (gain)**
3. **District 15, 7.88%**

== See also ==
- 2017 Westchester County Executive election
- Westchester County Board of Legislators
