= 2025 Anchorage municipal election =

General election in Anchorage, Alaska

- April 1, 2025

Citizens of Anchorage, Alaska voted on fifteen ballot propositions on April 1, 2025, which were approved by the Anchorage Assembly, as well as six Assembly seats.

== Assembly ==
Six seats to the Anchorage Assembly were elected.

== Ballot measures ==
=== Proposition 1 ===
Proposition 1, officially the Capital Improvements for School District Bond Measure, would allocate $63,822,000 to maintain school facilities in the Anchorage School District.

==== Endorsements ====
Yes

Organizations

- Anchorage School District

==== Results ====
Anchorage Proposition 1
Choice	Votes	%
For	30,614	51.30
Against	29,066	48.70
Total	59,680	100.00
Source: Municipality of Anchorage

=== Proposition 2 ===
Proposition 2, officially the Roads and Storm Drainage Bond Measure, would allocate $33,700,000 to pay for construction towards maintaining roads and storm drainage system.

==== Results ====
Anchorage Proposition 2
Choice	Votes	%
For	36,392	60.85
Against	23,418	39.15
Total	59,810	100.00
Source: Municipality of Anchorage

=== Proposition 3 ===
Proposition 3, officially the Parks and Recreation Bond Measure, would allocate $8,250,000 to fund local parks and trails. $2,900,000 would be allocated to improving Town Square Park.

==== Results ====
Anchorage Proposition 3
Choice	Votes	%
For	32,812	54.85
Against	27,013	45.15
Total	59,825	100.00
Source: Municipality of Anchorage

=== Proposition 4 ===
Proposition 4, officially the Police Service Area Bond Measure, would allocate $3,400,000 to fund improvements for the Anchorage Police Department.

==== Results ====
Anchorage Proposition 4
Choice	Votes	%
For	30,216	50.78
Against	29,290	49.22
Total	59,506	100.00
Source: Municipality of Anchorage

=== Proposition 5 ===
Proposition 5, officially the Public Safety Capital Improvement Bond Measure, would allocate $9,400,000 to fund various safety improvements in the city, including the purchase of new replacement ambulances.

==== Results ====
Anchorage Proposition 5
Choice	Votes	%
For	33,983	56.84
Against	25,805	43.16
Total	59,788	100.00
Source: Municipality of Anchorage

=== Proposition 6 ===
Proposition 6, officially the Senior Center and Libraries Capital Improvement Project Bonds, would allocate $2,800,000 to fund improvements across the Anchorage Public Library system, as well as renovations to the Anchorage Senior Center.

==== Results ====
Anchorage Proposition 6
Choice	Votes	%
For	34,549	58.50
Against	24,505	41.50
Total	59,054	100.00
Source: Municipality of Anchorage

=== Proposition 7 ===
Proposition 7, officially the Anchorage Fire Service Area Fire Protection Bond Measure, would allocate $2,400,000 to pay for new replacement fire trucks and fire water tenders.

==== Results ====
Anchorage Proposition 7
Choice	Votes	%
For	37,962	64.56
Against	20,840	35.44
Total	58,802	100.00
Source: Municipality of Anchorage

=== Proposition 8 ===
Proposition 8, officially the Road Improvements for Girdwood Valley Service Area Bond Measure, would allocate $3,000,000 to fund improvements in Girdwood.

==== Results ====
Anchorage Proposition 8
Choice	Votes	%
For	32,214	54.76
Against	26,609	45.24
Total	58,823	100.00
Source: Municipality of Anchorage

=== Proposition 9 ===
Proposition 9, officially the Chugach State Park Access Service Area Bond Measure, would allocate $300,000 to fund an overflow parking lot near the Chugach State Park.

==== Results ====
Anchorage Proposition 9
Choice	Votes	%
For	32,214	54.76
Against	26,609	45.24
Total	58,823	100.00
Source: Municipality of Anchorage

=== Proposition 10 ===
Proposition 10, officially the Roads and Drainage Service Area Snow-Response and Fleet Vehicle Special Tax Measure, would allocate $3,500,000 to pay for new and replacement snow plowing vehicles.

==== Results ====
Anchorage Proposition 10
Choice	Votes	%
For	25,324	59.75
Against	17,059	40.25
Total	42,383	100.00
Source: Municipality of Anchorage

=== Proposition 11 ===
Proposition 11, officially the Anchorage Metropolitan Police Service Area Police Vehicle Special Tax Measure, would allocate $3,000,000 to pay for new and replacement police vehicles in the Anchorage Metropolitan Police Service Area.

==== Results ====
Anchorage Proposition 11
Choice	Votes	%
For	25,140	43.27
Against	32,960	56.73
Total	58,100	100.00
Source: Municipality of Anchorage

=== Proposition 12 ===
Proposition 12, officially the Chugiak, Birchwood, Eagle River Rural Road Service Area Mill Rate Adjustment Measure, would increase the mill levy to a maximum of 2.40 mills in the Chugiak, Birchwood, Eagle River Rural Road Service Area. The proposition only applies to those in that area.

==== Results ====
Anchorage Proposition 12
Choice	Votes	%
For	3,999	43.72
Against	5,148	56.28
Total	9,147	100.00
Source: Municipality of Anchorage

=== Proposition 13 ===
Proposition 13, officially the De-Annexation of Lot 2 Huisingh Subdivision Measure, would de-annex Lot 2 Huisingh Subdivision from the Totem Limited Road Service Area. The proposition only applies to those in that area.

==== Results ====
Anchorage Proposition 13
Choice	Votes	%
For	69	83.13
Against	14	16.87
Total	83	100.00
Source: Municipality of Anchorage

=== Proposition 14 ===
Proposition 14, officially the De-Annexation of Lots 1 & 16 Block 2 Elmore Subdivision Measure, would de-annex Lots 1 & 16 Block 2 Elmore Subdivision from the Birch Tree/Elmore Limited Road Service Area and amend the Anchorage Municipal Code. The proposition only applies to those in that area.

==== Results ====
Anchorage Proposition 14
Choice	Votes	%
For	279	59.62
Against	189	40.38
Total	468	100.00
Source: Municipality of Anchorage

=== Proposition 15 ===
Proposition 15, officially the Annexation of Lots 6-18 Block 2 and Lots 9-13 Block 3 Equestrian Heights Subdivision Measure, would annex Lots 6 to 18 Block 2, and Lots 9 to 13 Block 3 of the Equestrian Heights Subdivision into the Birch Tree/Elmore Limited Road Service Area. The proposition only applies to those in that area.

==== Results ====
Anchorage Proposition 15
Choice	Votes	%
For	266	56.72
Against	203	43.28
Total	469	100.00
Source: Municipality of Anchorage
