= 2025 Garland mayoral election =

Election for city mayor in Texas, US

- May 3, 2025 (first round); June 7, 2025 (runoff)
| Candidate | Dylan Hedrick | Deborah Morris | PC Matthew |
| First round | 3,253; 33.16% | 4,167; 42.47% | 810; 8.26% |
| Runoff | 4,007; 51.70% | 3,744; 48.30% | Eliminated |
| Candidate | Shibu Samuel | Roel Garcia |
| First round | 726; 7.40% | 512; 5.22% |
| Runoff | Eliminated | Eliminated |
Mayor before election
Scott LeMay
Elected mayor
Dylan Hedrick

The 2025 Garland mayoral election was held on May 3, 2025 to elect the next mayor of Garland, Texas. Incumbent mayor Scott LeMay was term-limited and ineligible to run for re-election to a fourth consecutive term. Because no candidate received more than 50% of the vote in the first round, the two highest-placing candidates advanced to a runoff election on June 7th. Municipal elections in Texas are officially nonpartisan.

Six candidates qualified for the first round, with former Garland city councilors Deborah Morris and Dylan Hedrick advancing to the runoff. Hedrick won the runoff with 51.7% of the vote.

== General election ==
=== Candidates ===
==== Advanced to runoff ====
- Dylan Hedrick, former Garland city councilor
- Deborah Morris, former Garland city councilor

==== Eliminated ====
- Roel Garcia
- PC Matthew
- Koni Ramos-Kaiwi
- Shibu Samuel

=== Results ===
2025 Garland mayoral general election
| Candidate | Votes | % |
|---|---|---|
| Deborah Morris | 4,167 | 42.47 |
| Dylan Hedrick | 3,253 | 33.16 |
| PC Matthew | 810 | 8.26 |
| Shibu Samuel | 726 | 7.40 |
| Roel Garcia | 512 | 5.22 |
| Koni Ramos-Kaiwi | 343 | 3.50 |
| Total votes | 9,811 | 100.00 |

== Runoff ==
=== Results ===
2025 Garland mayoral runoff
| Candidate | Votes | % |
|---|---|---|
| Dylan Hedrick | 4,007 | 51.70 |
| Deborah Morris | 3,744 | 48.30 |
| Total votes | 7,751 | 100.00 |
