= Errol D. Toulon Jr. =

American sheriff

67th Sheriff of Suffolk County
- Incumbent
- Assumed office January 1, 2018
- Preceded by: Vincent F. DeMarco

Personal details
- Born: July 20, 1962 (age 64) The Bronx, New York, U.S.
- Party: Democratic
- Spouse: Susan Toulon (m. 1984; died 2013) Christina Toulon (m. 2016)
- Children: 2
- Website: suffolksheriff.com

Errol D. Toulon Jr. (born July 20, 1962) is the 67th and current sheriff of Suffolk County, New York on Long Island. Toulon is the first African American sheriff and first African American elected official to hold a nonjudicial countywide office in Suffolk County. Sheriff Toulon was re-elected to a second term on November 2, 2021.

== Early life and education ==
Errol D. Toulon Jr. was raised in The Bronx, New York. His parents are Errol Sr. and Alma. His father was a Level I Warden in the New York City Department of Corrections and his mother worked in education. In the late 1970s, "Junior" served for two years as a batboy for the New York Yankees.

He graduated from Cardinal Hayes High School and earned a Master of Business Administration degree at Dowling College in 2007. He went on to earn an Advanced Certificate in Homeland Security Management from Long Island University. Toulon completed his Doctorate in Educational Administration from Dowling College in 2011.

== Career ==
=== New York City Department of Corrections ===
Toulon spent 22 years as a uniformed Member of Service with the New York City Department of Correction at Riker’s Island, where he served as a supervisor and instructor at the Correction Academy, the Firearms and Tactics Unit, Emergency Service Unit and Office of Compliance Consultants.

In July 2014, Toulon was named Deputy Commissioner of Operations for the New York City Department of Corrections. As Deputy Commissioner of Operations, he oversaw 10,000 employees (uniformed and civilian) and an operating budget of $1.8 billion. He acted as senior advisor to the commissioner on all aspects of operations and system improvements and directly supervised the department's Correction Academy, the Correction Intelligence Bureau, the Operations Security Intelligence Unit, the Fusion Center, the Office of Emergency Management, the Fire & Safety Unit, the Policies and Procedures Unit, the Nutritional Services Unit, the Environmental Health Unit, the Financial and Engineering Auditing Unit, PREA, and the Office of Policy Compliance. His main objective was focusing on improving management and strategy.

=== Assistant Deputy County Executive for Suffolk County ===
Toulon served as the Assistant Deputy County Executive for Public Safety from September 2012 to July 2014 under the administration of County Executive Steve Bellone. From this position, he oversaw 10,000 employees and an operating budget of $2.5 billion. the Suffolk County Police Department, Fire Rescue and Emergency Services, the Probation Department, the Medical Examiner's Office, and the Traffic and Parking Violations Agency.

=== Suffolk County Sheriff ===
With over 300,000 votes cast, Toulon was elected with 49.56% of the vote in 2017 in his bid for Suffolk County Sheriff, defeating challenger Larry Zacarese. On January 12, 2018, Sheriff Errol D. Toulon Jr. was sworn into office by New York Governor Andrew M. Cuomo. He became the first African American elected to any nonjudicial countywide office in Suffolk County. As Sheriff, Toulon has focused on combating gangs and the opioid epidemic, implementing programs to fight recidivism, and providing access to community programs for Suffolk County residents.

The Suffolk County Sheriff’s Office has started a program that tries to fill the needs of older men jailed at the county correctional facility. The Senior Rehabilitation Pod Program is believed to be the first in the nation to segregate male inmates 50 and older from younger inmates to better concentrate on services more suited to the older inmates' needs. The program offers a wide range of services — everything from 12-step programs to employment counseling to mental health services — dedicated to improving the quality of older inmates’ lives while they are in jail and when they are released.

In April 2018, Toulon started a new chaplaincy program to assist in times of need for the Suffolk County Sheriff’s Office Staff. The 10 Chaplains, from various religious faiths were sworn in at the Yaphank Correctional Facility. According to the Suffolk County Sheriff's Office, the purpose of the Sheriff’s Chaplaincy Program is to provide interfaith emotional and spiritual counsel to Sheriff’s Office employees and their families during times of need and heightened stress.

In February 2020, Toulon launched the Sheriff's Transition and Reentry Team (S.T.A.R.T.) Resource Center. Located on the grounds of the Yaphank Correctional Center, the START Resource Center provides assistance to current and former inmates as they transition back into the community, whether they were incarcerated in Suffolk County or are returning to Suffolk after incarceration upstate or in another state. This assistance comes in the form of employment assistance, help finding housing, mental health and substance abuse treatment, clothing, and food. The START Center is staffed by five correction officers (three of which are correction counselors and two are Community Correction Officers). Satellite locations of the Center were opened in Wyandanch and Port Jefferson to help better meet the needs of formerly incarcerated individuals who have transportation problems. Since its inception, the START Center has assisted more than 500 inmates and boasts that former inmates who work with the Center have a 12% recidivism rate as opposed to the national average of 30%.

On April 26, 2023, Toulon launched the Corrections Intelligence Center on the grounds of the Suffolk County Correctional Facility in Yaphank. According to Toulon, this center is the first-of-its-kind jail intelligence network that shares data, trends, best practices, and potential threats across jails and prisons. The Corrections Intelligence Center is fully staffed with specially trained Corrections Intelligence Officers from participating agencies including New York State Department of Corrections and Community Supervision, New York City Department of Correction, Nassau County Sheriff’s Office, Westchester Department of Corrections and Morris County (NJ) Sheriff’s Office. The center also includes remote participation from 20 additional counties in the regional area that are participating in bi-weekly roundtables in addition to receiving immediate alerts to potential threats and trends. Sheriff Toulon also announced plans to expand the CIC to national and international partners.

In May 2023, Sheriff Toulon was appointed to the Public Safety Officer Medal of Valor Review Board, succeeding Joseph Fox of New York. The Medal of Valor is the highest national award for valor by a public safety officer in the United States, recognizing extraordinary acts of heroism and bravery. The eleven-member review board evaluates nominations and recommends individuals for recognition.

In September 2023, Sheriff Errol D. Toulon Jr. and Undersheriff Kevin Catalina traveled to El Salvador to meet with the ministers of defense and justice and to visit the newly built Center for the Confinement of Terrorism (CECOT) prison. This facility houses high-level MS-13 and 18th Street gang members.

== Personal life ==
Toulon is a three-time cancer survivor, having been diagnosed with Hodgkin's lymphoma in 1996 and with pancreatic cancer in 2003. His first wife, Susan, died after 29 years of marriage. They had two children. He remarried in 2016.
