= 2025 Pittsburgh municipal election =

2025 Pennsylvania local election

2025 Pittsburgh elections
- November 4, 2025

A general election was held in Pittsburgh, Pennsylvania on November 4, 2025, to elect various city-level positions. The primary election was held on May 20, 2025.

== City Council ==
=== District 2 ===
==== Democratic Primary ====
===== Candidates =====
====== Nominee ======
- Kim Salinetro, Chief of Staff for councilor Theresa Kail Smith

====== Eliminated before primary ======
- Amanda Neatrour, small business owner and advocate (disqualified, then ran write-in campaign for primary)
- David Binkoski, community organizer (disqualified)

===== Results =====
Democratic primary
Party	Candidate	Votes	%
Democratic	Kim Salinetro	4,016	86.81
Write-in		610	13.19
Total votes		4,626	100.00

==== Republican Primary ====
===== Candidates =====
====== Nominee ======
- Erin Koper, conservative activist

===== Results =====
Republican primary
Party	Candidate	Votes	%
Republican	Erin Koper	639	94.11
Write-in		41	5.89
Total votes		680	100.00

=== General election ===
==== Results ====
2025 Pittsburgh City Council election, district 2
Party	Candidate	Votes	%
Democratic	Kim Salinetro	6,772	71.46
Republican	Erin Koper	2,165	22.84
Independent	David Tessitor	509	5.37
Write-in		31	0.33
Total votes		9,477	100.00

=== District 4 ===
==== Democratic Primary ====
===== Candidates =====
====== Nominee ======
- Anthony Coghill, incumbent councilor

====== Withdrawn ======
- Brian Naughton

===== Results =====
Democratic primary
Party	Candidate	Votes	%
Democratic	Anthony Coghill (incumbent)	4,985	97.25
Write-in		141	2.75
Total votes		5,126	100.00

==== Republican Primary ====
===== Candidates =====
====== Nominee ======
- Tracy L. Larger

===== Results =====
Republican primary
Party	Candidate	Votes	%
Republican	Tracy L. Larger	714	95.20
Write-in		36	4.80
Total votes		750	100.00

=== General election ===
==== Results ====
2025 Pittsburgh City Council election, district 4
Party	Candidate	Votes	%
Democratic	Anthony Coghill (incumbent)	7,663	72.22
Republican	Tracy L. Larger	1,880	17.72
Independent	Brian Naughton	1,046	9.86
Write-in		21	0.20
Total votes		10,610	100.00

=== District 6 ===
==== Democratic Primary ====
===== Candidates =====
====== Nominee ======
- Robert Daniel Lavelle, incumbent councilor

===== Results =====
Democratic primary
Party	Candidate	Votes	%
Democratic	Robert Daniel Lavelle (incumbent)	3,627	97.29
Write-in		101	2.71
Total votes		3,728	100.00

==== Republican Primary ====
===== Candidates =====
====== Nominee ======
- Jacob J. Dumont

===== Results =====
Republican primary
Party	Candidate	Votes	%
Republican	Jacob J. Dumont	155	95.68
Write-in		7	4.32
Total votes		162	100.00

=== General election ===
==== Results ====
2025 Pittsburgh City Council election, district 6
Party	Candidate	Votes	%
Democratic	Robert Daniel Lavelle (incumbent)	5,612	88.66
Republican	Jacob J. Dumont	570	9.00
Write-in		148	2.34
Total votes		6,330	100.00

=== District 8 ===
==== Democratic Primary ====
===== Candidates =====
====== Nominee ======
- Erika Strassburger, incumbent councilor

===== Results =====
Democratic primary
Party	Candidate	Votes	%
Democratic	Erika Strassburger (incumbent)	5,340	98.18
Write-in		99	1.82
Total votes		5,439	100.00

==== Republican Primary ====
===== Results =====
Republican primary
Party	Candidate	Votes	%
	Write-in	28	100.00
Total votes		27	100.00

=== General election ===
==== Results ====
2025 Pittsburgh City Council election, district 8
Party	Candidate	Votes	%
Democratic	Erika Strassburger (incumbent)	9,412	98.31
Write-in		162	1.69
Total votes		9,583	100.00

== School board of directors ==
=== District 1 ===
==== Democratic Primary ====
===== Candidates =====
====== Nominee ======
- Tawana Cook Purnell, retired educator

====== Eliminated in primary ======
- Carlos Thomas, community organizer

===== Results =====
Democratic primary
Party	Candidate	Votes	%
Democratic	Tawana Cook Purnell	3,981	61.27
Democratic	Carlos Thomas	2,490	38.32
Write-in		27	0.42
Total votes		6,498	100.00

==== Republican Primary ====
===== Results =====
Republican primary
Party	Candidate	Votes	%
	Write-in	15	100.00
Total votes		15	100.00

=== General election ===
==== Results ====
2025 Pittsburgh School Board of Directors election, district 1
Party	Candidate	Votes	%
Democratic	Tawana Cook Purnell	8,784	99.10
Write-in		80	0.90
Total votes		8,864	100.00

=== District 3 ===
==== Democratic Primary ====
===== Candidates =====
====== Nominee ======
- Erikka Grayson, business director

====== Eliminated in primary ======
- Tonya Fores, transportation supervisor

===== Results =====
Democratic primary
Party	Candidate	Votes	%
Democratic	Erikka Grayson	3,726	73.12
Democratic	Tonya Fores	1,347	26.43
Write-in		23	0.45
Total votes		5,096	100.00

==== Republican Primary ====
===== Results =====
Republican primary
Party	Candidate	Votes	%
	Write-in	20	100.00
Total votes		20	100.00

=== General election ===
==== Results ====
2025 Pittsburgh School Board of Directors election, district 3
Party	Candidate	Votes	%
Democratic	Erikka Grayson	7,975	99.25
Write-in		60	0.75
Total votes		8,035	100.00

=== District 5 ===
==== Democratic Primary ====
===== Candidates =====
====== Nominee ======
- Tracey Reed, incumbent school director

===== Results =====
Democratic primary
Party	Candidate	Votes	%
Democratic	Tracey Reed (incumbent)	5,385	98.79
Write-in		66	1.21
Total votes		5,451	100.00

==== Republican Primary ====
===== Results =====
Republican primary
Party	Candidate	Votes	%
	Write-in	47	100.00
Total votes		47	100.00

=== General election ===
==== Results ====
2025 Pittsburgh School Board of Directors election, district 5
Party	Candidate	Votes	%
Democratic	Tracey Reed (incumbent)	9,306	98.48
Write-in		144	1.52
Total votes		9,450	100.00

=== District 7 ===
==== Democratic Primary ====
===== Candidates =====
====== Nominee ======
- Eva Diodati, librarian

====== Eliminated in primary ======
- Mahdi Bey, constituent services advisor for state representative Jessica Benham

===== Results =====
Democratic primary
Party	Candidate	Votes	%
Democratic	Eva Diodati	2,151	51.53
Democratic	Mahdi Bey	2,004	48.01
Write-in		19	0.46
Total votes		4,174	100.00

==== Republican Primary ====
===== Results =====
Republican primary
Party	Candidate	Votes	%
	Write-in	59	100.00
Total votes		59	100.00

=== General election ===
==== Results ====
2025 Pittsburgh School Board of Directors election, district 7
Party	Candidate	Votes	%
Democratic	Eva Diodati	6,738	97.82
Write-in		150	2.18
Total votes		6,888	100.00

=== District 9 ===
==== Democratic Primary ====
===== Candidates =====
====== Nominee ======
- Gene Walker, incumbent school director

====== Eliminated in primary ======
- Allie Petonic, researcher and public schools advocate

===== Results =====
Democratic primary
Party	Candidate	Votes	%
Democratic	Gene Walker (incumbent)	2,663	49.81
Democratic	Allie Petonic	2,658	49.72
Write-in		25	0.47
Total votes		5,346	100.00

==== Republican Primary ====
===== Results =====
Republican primary
Party	Candidate	Votes	%
	Write-in	82	100.00
Total votes		82	100.00

=== General election ===
==== Results ====
2025 Pittsburgh School Board of Directors election, district 9
Party	Candidate	Votes	%
Democratic	Gene Walker (incumbent)	7,831	97.38
Write-in		211	2.62
Total votes		8,042	100.00
