= Westland Hialeah Senior High School =

Westland Hialeah Senior High

Location
- 4000 W 18th Ave; Hialeah, Florida 33012; United States
- 25.85794°N 80.31892°W

Information
- School type: Public, high school
- Established: August 2007; opened January 7, 2008
- School district: Miami-Dade County Public Schools
- Principal: Lucy P. Trillas
- Teaching staff: 51.00 FTEs
- Grades: 9-12
- Enrollment: 1,191 (2024-2025)
- Student to teacher ratio: 23.35
- Campus type: Suburban
- Colors: Red, Black, and Grey
- Mascot: Wildcat
- Website: westlandwildcats.net

Westland Hialeah High School is a four-year public high school located at 4000 West 18th Avenue in Hialeah, Florida, United States, a suburb of Miami. The school is a part of Miami-Dade County Public Schools. Its principal is Lucy P. Trillas.

As of the 2024-2025 school year, the school had an enrollment of 1,191 students and 51.0 classroom teachers (on an FTE basis), for a student–teacher ratio of 25.8:1. There were 688 students (57.7% of enrollment) eligible for free lunch and 51 (4.3% of students) eligible for reduced-cost lunch.

== History ==
Westland Hialeah Senior High School was established in August 2007, becoming the fourth public high school to serve the city of Hialeah, and was built to alleviate overcrowding in the three high schools already serving the area. The school opened on January 7, 2008, and serves students in grades nine through twelve.

The attendance boundaries cover a large part of southwestern Hialeah, an area that was previously served mainly by Hialeah-Miami Lakes Senior High School and Miami Springs Senior High School.

The Class of 2010 was the first graduating class of the school, and the founding class, Class of 2011, graduated in June 2011.

== Academics ==
Westland Hialeah Senior High School provides a full curriculum for students in grades nine through twelve. The school’s academic program includes core academic courses, advanced and college-level courses, career and technical education programs, magnet programs, and specialized academies. Students are able to follow academic, career and college-prep tracks that prepare them for many postsecondary goals.

== School uniforms ==
The school requires its students to wear uniforms consisting of a grey, red, or black polo shirt and black or khaki pants. No sandals or other open-toed shoes are allowed. Students are not allowed to wear jeans or “sweat pant style bottoms” of any type. In addition, students are required to wear their IDs at all times. Crocs are allowed in "sports mode." This new rule was just recently added in July 2023, before the 2023-2024 school year started.

== Demographics ==
As of the 2024-2025 school year, Westland Hialeah High School's demographic makeup is 97.1% Hispanic, or 1,156 students (mostly Cuban and of Cuban descent), 1.8% Black, or 21 students, and 1.1% White, or 13 students.

== Grades ==
School Year	Grade
2007-08	C
2008-09	C
2009-10	B
2010-11	A
2011-12	B
2012-13	B
2013-14	C
2014-15	B
2015-16	C
2016-17	C
2017-18	B
2018-19	B
2021-22	C
2022-23	C
2023-24	B
2024-25	A
2025-26	B

== See also ==
- Education in the United States
