= 2021 Toledo, Ohio mayoral election =

- November 2, 2021
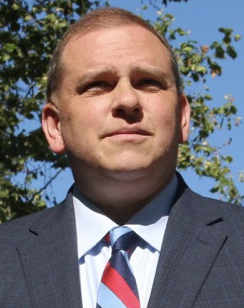

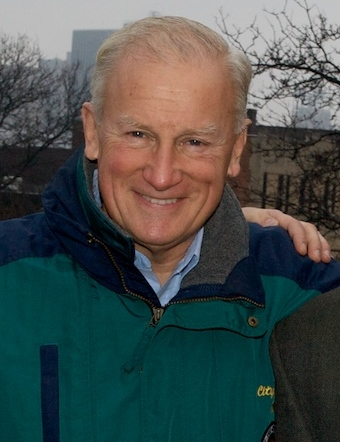
Candidate	Wade Kapszukiewicz	Carty Finkbeiner
Party	Nonpartisan	Nonpartisan
Alliance	Democratic	Independent
Popular vote	20,945	9,023
Percentage	69.89%	30.11%
- Precinct results Kapszukiewicz: 50–60% 60–70% 70–80% 80–90% >90% Finkbeiner: 50–60% Tie: 40–50% 50%
Mayor before election
Wade Kapszukiewicz
Democratic
Elected mayor
Wade Kapszukiewicz
Democratic

Toledo, Ohio, held an election for mayor on November 2, 2021. The election was officially nonpartisan, with the top two candidates from the September 14 primary election advancing to the general election, regardless of party. Incumbent Democratic mayor Wade Kapszukiewicz successfully ran for reelection.

== Primary election ==
=== Candidates ===
==== Declared ====
- Carty Finkbeiner (Independent), former mayor
- Wade Kapszukiewicz (Democratic), incumbent mayor
- Jan Scotland (Republican), businessman and former city councilor

==== Did not file ====
- Reginald Arrington Jr.
- Sharmayne Ivey
- Paul Manning

==== Declined ====
- George Sarantou, former city finance director and former city councilor (running for city council)

=== Endorsements ===
Wade Kapszukiewicz

Organizations

- Lucas County Democratic Party

=== Results ===
Primary election results
Party	Candidate	Votes	%
Nonpartisan	Wade Kapszukiewicz (incumbent)	6,590	53.77%
Nonpartisan	Carty Finkbeiner	3,323	27.11%
Nonpartisan	Jan Scotland	2,286	18.65%
Write-in		57	0.47%
Total votes		12,256	100.00

== General election ==
=== Results ===
General election results
Party	Candidate	Votes	%
Nonpartisan	Wade Kapszukiewicz (incumbent)	20,945	69.89%
Nonpartisan	Carty Finkbeiner	9,023	30.11%
Total votes		29,968	100.00
