= 2021 Tuscaloosa mayoral election =

2021 election in Alabama, U.S.

- March 2, 2021
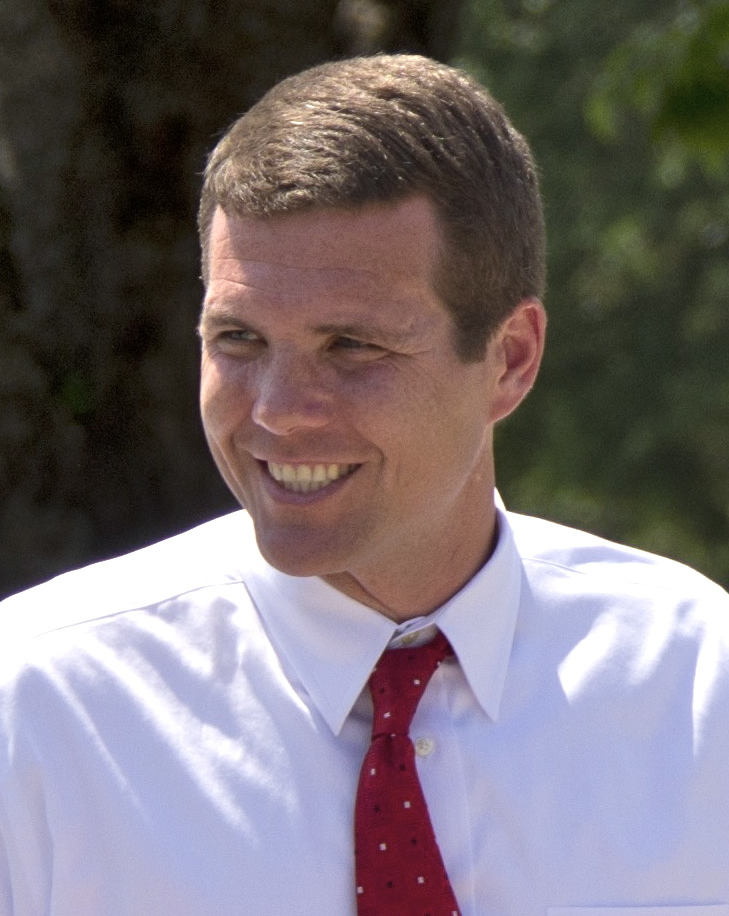

Candidate	Walt Maddox	Martin Houston	Serena Fortenberry
Party	Nonpartisan	Nonpartisan	Nonpartisan
Popular vote	7,017	3,536	1,849
Percentage	56.6%	28.5%	14.9%
Mayor before election
Walt Maddox
Elected mayor
Walt Maddox

The 2021 Tuscaloosa mayoral election was held on March 2, 2021, to elect the mayor of Tuscaloosa, Alabama. Incumbent mayor Walt Maddox was re-elected to a fifth consecutive four-year term.

== Candidates ==
=== Declared ===
- Serena Fortenberry, University of Alabama professor
- Martin Houston, businessman and former Alabama Crimson Tide football player
- Walt Maddox, incumbent mayor

== Results ==
2021 Tuscaloosa mayoral election
Candidate	Votes	%
Walt Maddox (incumbent)	7,017	56.58
Martin Houston	3,536	28.51
Serena Fortenberry	1,849	14.91
Total votes	12,402	100.00
