= 2025 Philadelphia municipal election =

2025 Pennsylvania local election

2025 Philadelphia elections
- November 4, 2025

A general election was held in Philadelphia, Pennsylvania on November 4, 2025, to elect various county and city-level positions. The primary election was held on May 20, 2025.

== District Attorney ==
=== Results ===
2025 Philadelphia District Attorney election
Party	Candidate	Votes	%
Democratic	Larry Krasner (incumbent)	276,126	76.10
Republican	Patrick Dugan	86,305	23.78
Write-in		432	0.12
Total votes		362,836	100.00

== City Controller ==
2025 Philadelphia city controller election
- November 4, 2025

Candidate	Christy Brady	Ari Patrinos
Party	Democratic	Republican
Popular vote	294,433	46,681
Percentage	86.25%	13.67%
- Brady: 50–60% 60–70% 70–80% 80–90% >90% Patrinos: 50–60% 60–70% Tie: 50%
City Controller before election
Christy Brady
Democratic
Elected City Controller
Christy Brady
Democratic

=== Democratic primary ===
==== Candidates ====
===== Nominee =====
- Christy Brady, incumbent city controller

==== Results ====
Democratic primary
Party	Candidate	Votes	%
Democratic	Christy Brady (incumbent)	120,801	99.61
Write-in		469	0.39
Total votes		121,270	100.00

=== Republican primary ===
==== Candidates ====
===== Nominee =====
- Ari Patrinos, stockbroker

==== Results ====
Republican primary
Party	Candidate	Votes	%
Republican	Ari Patrinos	7,835	97.02
Write-in		241	2.98
Total votes		8,076	100.00

=== General election ===
==== Results ====
2025 Philadelphia City Controller election
Party	Candidate	Votes	%
Democratic	Christy Brady (incumbent)	294,433	86.25
Republican	Ari Patrinos	46,681	13.67
Write-in		258	0.08
Total votes		341,372	100.00

== Court of Common Pleas partisan election ==
=== Democratic primary ===
==== Candidates ====
===== Nominees =====
- Will Braveman, attorney
- Irina Ehrlich, prosecutor and defense attorney
- Larry Farnese, former state senator from the 1st district
- Kia Ghee, former Philadelphia executive director of the Commission of Human Relations
- Sarah Jones, attorney
- Leon King II, former Philadelphia Department of Prisons commissioner
- Brian Kisielewski, attorney
- Anthony Stefanski, attorney
- Deborah Watson-Stokes, senior advisor at the District Attorney's office

===== Eliminated in primary =====
- Taniesha Henry, attorney

===== Disqualified =====
- Mike Huff, criminal defense attorney (residency challenge)

==== Results ====
Democratic primary (vote for up to 9)
Party	Candidate	Votes	%
Democratic	Will Braveman	103,441	11.24
Democratic	Sarah Jones	103,042	11.19
Democratic	Deborah Watson-Stokes	100,952	10.97
Democratic	Kia Ghee	98,632	10.71
Democratic	Irina Ehrlich	98,458	10.70
Democratic	Larry Farnese	98,327	10.68
Democratic	Leon King II	92,483	10.05
Democratic	Brian Kisielewski	87,162	9.47
Democratic	Anthony Stefanski	75,539	8.21
Democratic	Taniesha Henry	61,041	6.63
Write-in		1,484	0.16
Total votes		920,561	100.00

=== Republican primary ===
==== Results ====
Republican primary (vote for up to 9)
Party	Candidate	Votes	%
	Write-in	2,140	100.00
Total votes		2,140	100.00

=== General election ===
==== Results ====
2025 Philadelphia Court of Common Pleas election (vote for up to 11)
Party	Candidate	Votes	%
Democratic	Sarah Jones	280,160	10.35
Democratic	Kia Ghee	274,323	10.13
Democratic	Will Braveman	274,195	10.13
Democratic	Larry Farnese	273,978	10.12
Democratic	Deborah Watson-Stokes	272,216	10.05
Democratic	Irinia Ehrlich	269,154	9.94
Democratic	Jennifer Santiago	221,310	8.17
Democratic	Brian Kisielewski	219,493	8.11
Democratic	Leon King II	215,637	7.96
Democratic	Anthony Stefanski	212,663	7.85
Democratic	Joseph Russo	190,318	7.03
Write-in		4,023	0.15
Total votes		2,707,470	100.00

== Court of Common Pleas retention elections ==
=== Results ===
Justice Gwendolyn N Bright retention, 2025
Choice	Votes	%
For	267,204	86.89
Against	40,316	13.11
Total	307,520	100.00
Source: Philadelphia City Commissioners

Justice Ann M Butchart retention, 2025
Choice	Votes	%
For	258,857	86.16
Against	41,573	13.84
Total	300,430	100.00
Source: Philadelphia City Commissioners

Justice Scott DiClaudio retention, 2025
Choice	Votes	%
For	182,493	64.37
Against	101,016	35.63
Total	283,509	100.00
Source: Philadelphia City Commissioners

Justice Michael Fanning retention, 2025
Choice	Votes	%
For	256,089	85.82
Against	42,306	14.18
Total	298,395	100.00
Source: Philadelphia City Commissioners

Justice Daine A Gray Jr retention, 2025
Choice	Votes	%
For	201,874	68.86
Against	91,271	31.14
Total	293,145	100.00
Source: Philadelphia City Commissioners

Justice Christopher P Mallios retention, 2025
Choice	Votes	%
For	244,439	84.80
Against	43,824	15.20
Total	288,263	100.00
Source: Philadelphia City Commissioners

Justice Walter J Olszewski retention, 2025
Choice	Votes	%
For	241,344	84.14
Against	45,480	15.86
Total	286,824	100.00
Source: Philadelphia City Commissioners

Justice Frank Palumbo retention, 2025
Choice	Votes	%
For	201,905	70.03
Against	86,418	29.97
Total	288,323	100.00
Source: Philadelphia City Commissioners

Justice Rainy Papademetriou retention, 2025
Choice	Votes	%
For	241,678	84.20
Against	45,366	15.80
Total	287,044	100.00
Source: Philadelphia City Commissioners

Justice Tracy Roman retention, 2025
Choice	Votes	%
For	249,704	85.45
Against	42,506	14.55
Total	292,210	100.00
Source: Philadelphia City Commissioners

Justice Stephanie M Sawyer retention, 2025
Choice	Votes	%
For	253,924	86.59
Against	39,336	13.41
Total	293,260	100.00
Source: Philadelphia City Commissioners

Justice Susan I Schulman retention, 2025
Choice	Votes	%
For	244,394	84.64
Against	44,368	15.36
Total	288,762	100.00
Source: Philadelphia City Commissioners

Justice Lyris F Younge retention, 2025
Choice	Votes	%
For	188,769	66.79
Against	93,846	33.21
Total	282,615	100.00
Source: Philadelphia City Commissioners

== Philadelphia Municipal Court partisan election ==
Three positions on the Philadelphia Municipal Court are up for partisan election.

=== Democratic primary ===
==== Candidates ====
===== Nominees =====
- Sherrie Cohen, tenant rights attorney
- Amanda Davidson, trial attorney
- Cortez Patton, chief council to state senator Anthony Williams

===== Eliminated in primary =====
- Shawn Page, attorney
- Qawi Abdul-Rahman, trial attorney

==== Results ====
Democratic primary (vote for up to 3)
Party	Candidate	Votes	%
Democratic	Amanda Davidson	101,702	31.96
Democratic	Sherrie Cohen	69,136	21.72
Democratic	Cortez Patton	63,745	20.03
Democratic	Shawn Page	49,571	15.58
Democratic	Qawi Abdul-Rahman	33,434	10.51
Write-in		662	0.21
Total votes		318,250	100.00

=== Republican primary ===
==== Results ====
Republican primary (vote for up to 3)
Party	Candidate	Votes	%
	Write-in	827	100.00
Total votes		827	100.00

=== General election ===
==== Results ====
2025 Philadelphia Municipal Court election (vote for up to 4)
Party	Candidate	Votes	%
Democratic	Amanda Davidson	289,678	29.71
Democratic	Sherrie Cohen	261,204	26.79
Democratic	Michael Parkinson	216,292	22.18
Democratic	Cortez Patton	206,403	21.17
Write-in		1,578	0.16
Total votes		975,155	100.00

== Philadelphia Municipal Court retention elections ==
=== Results ===
Justice David H Conroy retention, 2025
Choice	Votes	%
For	258,579	85.98
Against	42,171	14.02
Total	300,750	100.00
Source: Philadelphia City Commissioners

Justice Jacquelyn M Frazier-Lyde retention, 2025
Choice	Votes	%
For	212,705	71.24
Against	85,879	28.76
Total	298,584	100.00
Source: Philadelphia City Commissioners

Justice Henry Lewandowski retention, 2025
Choice	Votes	%
For	249,139	84.89
Against	44,352	15.11
Total	293,491	100.00
Source: Philadelphia City Commissioners

Justice Wendy L Pew retention, 2025
Choice	Votes	%
For	243,003	82.23
Against	52,515	17.77
Total	295,518	100.00
Source: Philadelphia City Commissioners

Justice T Francis Shields retention, 2025
Choice	Votes	%
For	250,066	85.43
Against	42,650	14.57
Total	292,716	100.00
Source: Philadelphia City Commissioners

== Ballot questions ==
Proposal 1 results by ward Yes: 60%–70%; 70%–80%; 80%–90%; 90%–100%

Proposed Charter Change 1: Creating the Office of Homeless Services Ombudsperson
Choice	Votes	%
For	138,497	84.78
Against	24,873	15.22
Total	163,370	100.00
Source: Philadelphia City Commissioners

Proposal 2 results by ward Yes: 50%–60%; 60%–70%; 70%–80%; 80%–90%; 90%–100%; No: 50%–60%

Proposed Charter Change 2: Increasing Minimum Spending on Housing Trust Fund Purposes
Choice	Votes	%
For	120,287	74.70
Against	40,745	25.30
Total	161,032	100.00
Source: Philadelphia City Commissioners

Proposal 3 results by ward Yes: 50%–60%; 60%–70%; 70%–80%; 80%–90%; 90%–100%

Proposed Charter Change 3: Creating an Independent Prison Community Oversight Board and Office of Prison Oversight
Choice	Votes	%
For	124,982	76.88
Against	37,585	23.12
Total	162,567	100.00
Source: Philadelphia City Commissioners
