= 2025 Plano municipal elections =

Plano municipal elections, 2025
- May 3, 2025 (first round); June 7, 2025 (runoff)
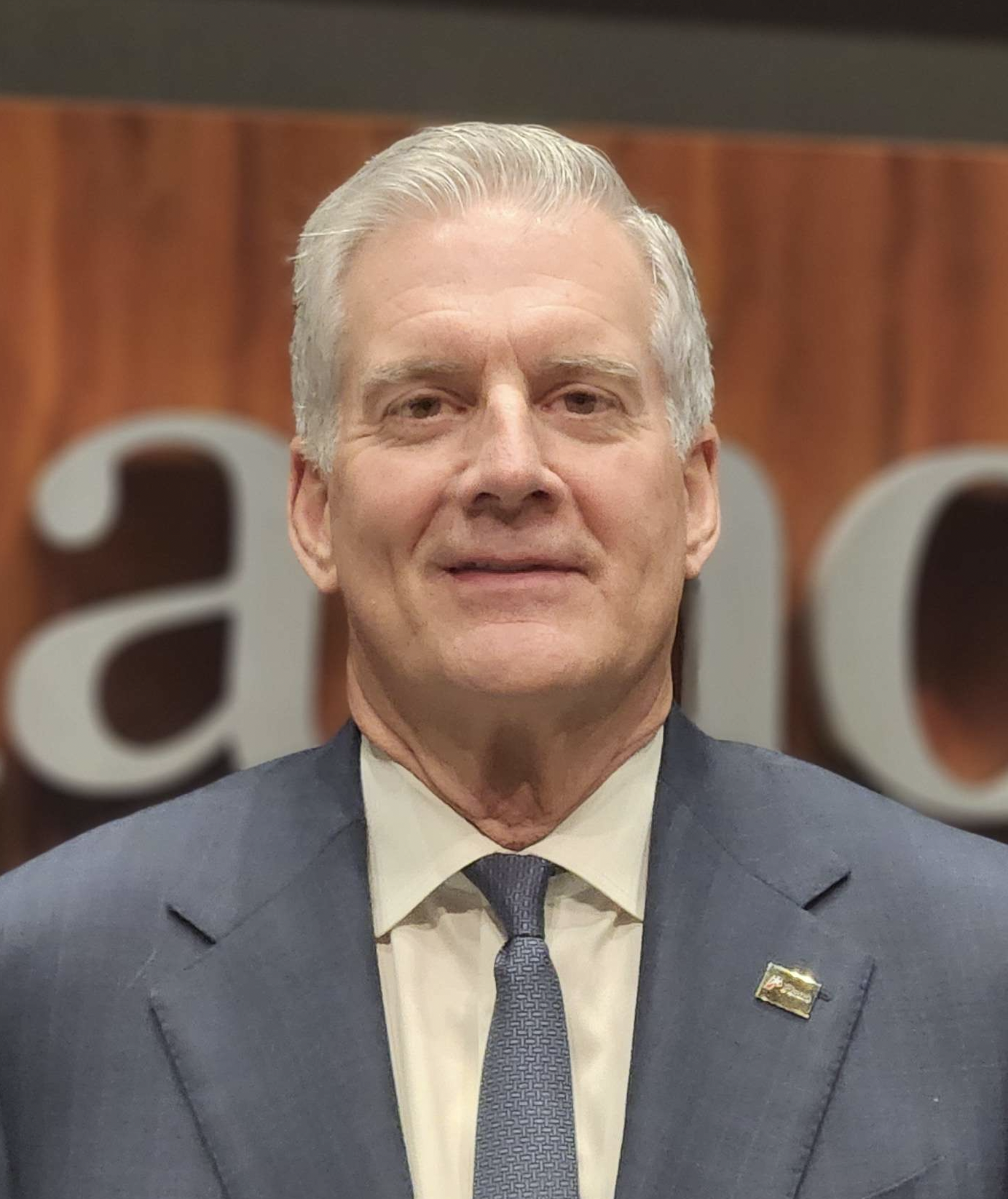
Candidate	John Muns
Popular vote	14,603
Percentage	100.0%
- Muns: 100% No data
Mayor before election
John Muns
Elected mayor
John Muns

The 2025 Plano municipal elections were held on May 3, 2025. In addition to the mayoral election (Place 6), seats were contested for Places 2, 4, and 8, as well as a special election for Place 5. If no candidate receives a majority of total vote, the top two candidates will advance to a run-off election held on June 7, 2025. Incumbent mayor John Muns ran for reelection unopposed.

== Council Seats ==
=== Place 2 ===
Incumbent councilmember Anthony Ricciardelli is term-limited and ineligible to run for reelection.

==== Candidates ====
- Bob Kehr, IT business owner
- Carson Underwood, vice-chair of the Collin County Park Advisory Commission
- Douglas Reeves, candidate for mayor in 2017

==== Endorsements ====
Bob Kehr
- Plano Area Democrats
Douglas Reeves
- Collin County Republican Party

==== Results ====
Candidate	Vote number	Vote percentage
Bob Kehr	10,748	55.68%
Douglas Reeves	4,511	23.37%
Carson K. Underwood	4,043	20.95%

Place 2 results by precinct: Kehr 40–50% 50–60% 60–70% 80–90% / Underwood 40–50% / No data

=== Place 4 ===
Incumbent councilmember Kayci Prince is term-limited and ineligible to run for reelection.

==== Candidates ====
- Chris Krupa Downs, estate attorney
- Cody Weaver, former Plano ISD trustee

==== Endorsements ====
Chris Downs
- Plano Area Democrats
Cody Weaver
- Collin County Republican Party

==== Results ====
Candidate	Vote number	Vote percentage
Chris Krupa Downs	10,547	54.96%
Cody Weaver	8,645	45.04%

Place 4 results by precinct: Krupa Downs 50–60% 60–70% 70–80% 80–90% / Weaver 50–60% 60–70% / No data

=== Place 5 (special election) ===
==== Candidates ====
- Gary Cary, business executive
- Steve Lavine, chair of the Plano Library Board

==== Endorsements ====
Gary Cary
- Collin County Republican Party
Steve Lavine
- Plano Area Democrats

==== Results ====
Candidate	Vote number	Vote percentage
Steve Lavine	10,922	57.70%
Gary Cary	8,007	42.30%

Place 5 results by precinct: Lavine 50–60% 60–70% 70–80% 80–90% >90% / Cary 50–60% 60–70% / No data

=== Place 6 (Mayor) ===
==== Candidates ====
- John Muns, incumbent mayor

==== Results ====
Candidate	Vote number	Vote percentage
John Muns	14,603	100.00%

=== Place 8 ===
Incumbent councilmember Rick Smith is term-limited and ineligible to run for reelection.

==== Candidates ====
- Hayden Padgett, chair of the Young Republican National Federation
- Vidal Quintanilla, human resources specialist

==== Endorsements ====
Hayden Padgett
- Collin County Republican Party
Vidal Quintanilla
- Plano Area Democrats

==== Results ====
Candidate	Vote number	Vote percentage
Vidal Quintanilla	10,177	53.90%
Hayden Padgett	8,705	46.10%

Place 8 results by precinct: Quintanilla 50–60% 60–70% 70–80% 80–90% / Padgett 40–50% 50–60% 60–70% / Tie/No data 50% No data
