= 2025 Westchester County Executive special election =

- February 11, 2025
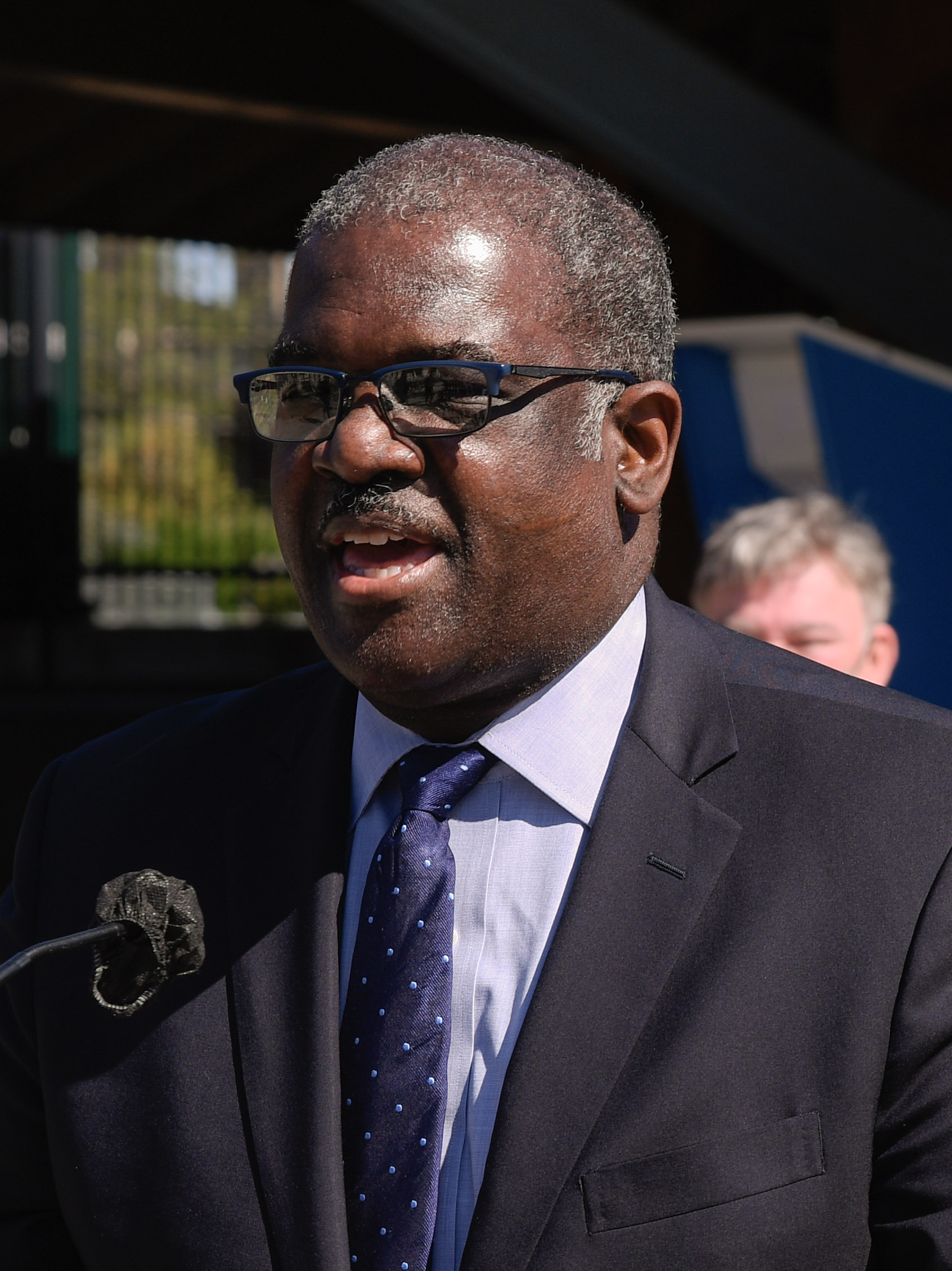

| Candidate | Ken Jenkins | Christine Sculti |
| Party | Democratic | Republican |
| Popular vote | 60,020 | 34,175 |
| Percentage | 63.70% | 36.30% |
County Executive before election
Ken Jenkins (Note: Jenkins was appointed County Executive by the Westchester County Board of Legislators on January 6, 2025 following the resignation of George Latimer.)
Democratic
Elected County Executive
Ken Jenkins
Democratic

The 2025 Westchester County Executive special election was held on February 11, 2025. The election was between former Deputy County Executive Ken Jenkins and former advisor to former County Executive Rob Astorino, Christine Sculti. The special election was held to fulfill the remainder of the term after previous County Executive George Latimer resigned to become the congressional representative for NY-16. Jenkins defeated Sculti by a comfortable margin.

== General election ==
2025 Westchester County Executive special election
| Party | Candidate | Votes | Percentage |
|---|---|---|---|
| Democratic | Kenneth W. Jenkins | 60,020 | 63.70% |
| Republican | Christine Sculti | 34,175 | 36.30% |
| Totals | | 92,288 | 100.00% |
| Democratic hold | | | |
