= Bryan Calvo =

American politician

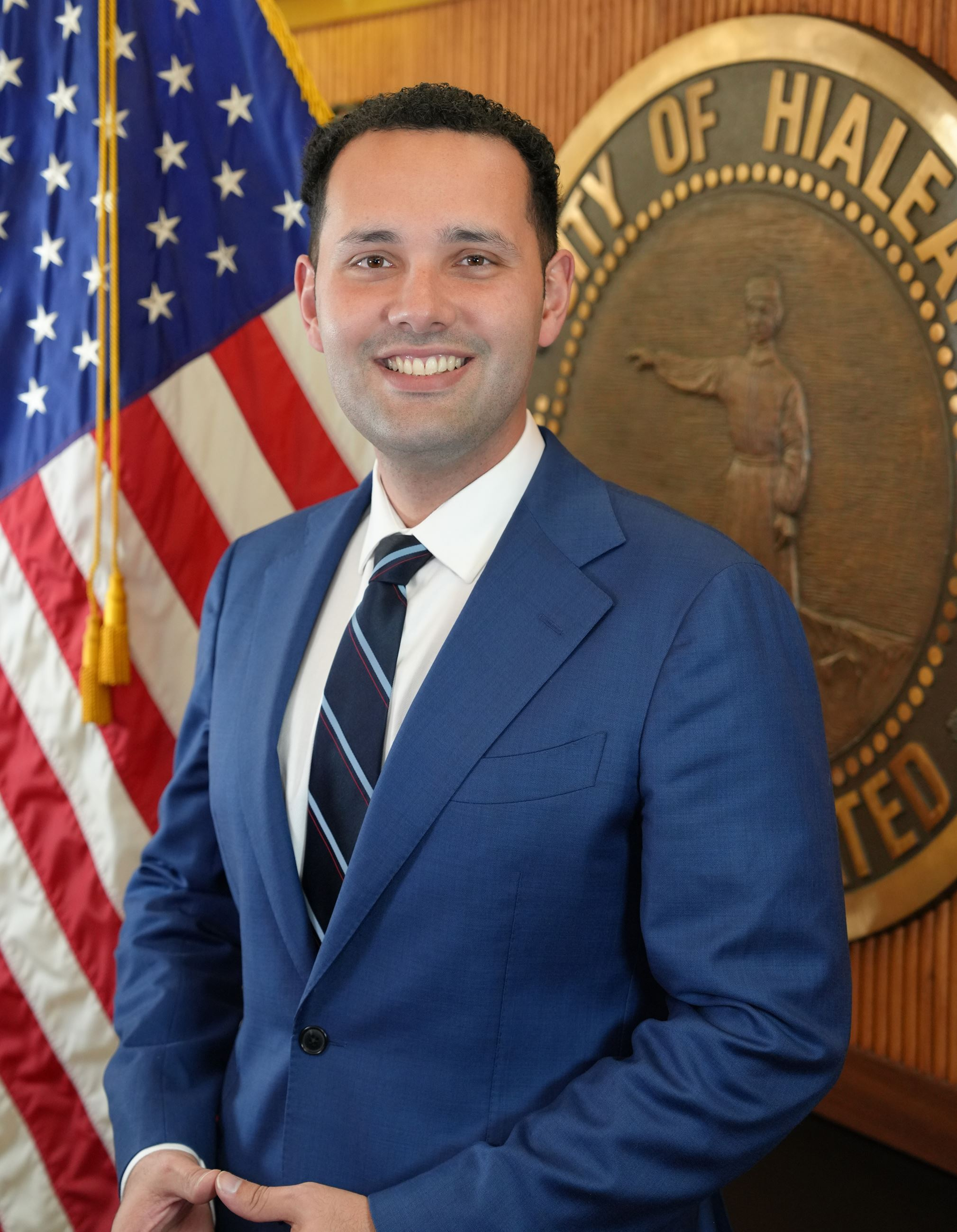
- Official portrait, 2026

Mayor of Hialeah
- Incumbent
- Assumed office January 12, 2026
- Preceded by: Jacqueline Garcia-Roves (acting); Esteban Bovo

Personal details
- Born: 1997 or 1998 (age 28) Hialeah, FL, U.S.
- Party: Republican
- Education: Harvard University (AB); Florida International University College of Law (J.D.)
- Website: bryancalvo.com

Bryan Calvo is an American politician serving as Mayor of Hialeah, Florida. He is known for being the youngest mayor in the state of Florida.

== Early life and education ==
Bryan Calvo is a lifelong resident of Hialeah, where he was born and raised. He attended local public schools and graduated as valedictorian of Westland Hialeah Senior High School. Calvo later received a full scholarship to Harvard University, where he earned a Bachelor of Arts in government and a language citation in Italian. He graduated in 2019. Following his undergraduate studies, Calvo enrolled at Florida International University College of Law, where he earned his Juris Doctor. He graduated in 2022.

== Career ==
In 2018, Calvo was selected for the White House Internship Program during the administration of Donald Trump. During the internship, he worked alongside federal officials and gained exposure to national public policy, including engagement with elected leaders and participation in policy-related initiatives.

Upon graduation from law school, he was admitted to practice law in Florida. He has worked in civil litigation, with experience in complex commercial matters, mass torts, and class actions.

== Political career ==
While attending law school, Calvo ran for and was elected to the Hialeah City Council, where he served as the youngest elected official in Miami-Dade County at the time of his election.

Calvo was elected mayor in November 2025. He received more than 52% of the vote, defeating his opponents by over 5,000 votes and avoiding a runoff. At age 27, he became the youngest mayor in the state of Florida.

Calvo was sworn in as mayor on January 12, 2026, and on his first day in office signed three executive orders aimed at promoting fiscal responsibility and transparency in city government. The orders eliminated deferred compensation payments for elected officials, created a task force to review business licenses with potential ties to the Cuban government, and imposed a freeze on certain city contracts pending mayoral approval.

The following day, he signed another executive order directing a review of the city's water and sewer system and billing practices, with the aim of identifying the causes of high utility costs and recommending solutions within 120 days.

Calvo supported a property tax relief program approved in February 2026 providing one-time rebate payments to qualifying senior homeowners in Hialeah. The initiative, funded through city resources, was expected to benefit thousands of residents aged 65 and older by offsetting a portion of their municipal property taxes without reducing city services or increasing taxes.

Calvo signed an additional executive order in March 2026 creating a homeowners association and condominium task force aimed at assisting residents and addressing complaints related to alleged mismanagement by HOA and condominium boards.
