= 2017 Jersey City mayoral election =

- November 7, 2017
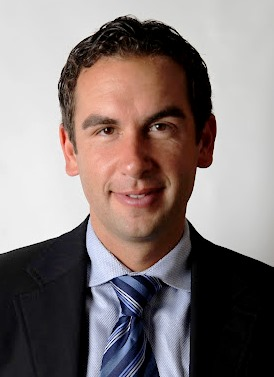
Candidate	Steve Fulop	Bill Matsikoudis
Party	Democratic	Democratic
Popular vote	29,739	8,559
Percentage	77.54%	22.32%
Mayor before election
Steve Fulop
Democratic
Elected mayor
Steve Fulop
Democratic

The Jersey City mayoral election of 2017 was held on November 7, 2017. Democrat Steve Fulop was re-elected to a second term with 77% of the vote. This was the first mayoral election after Jersey City voters approved moving the elections from May to November, following a 2016 referendum.

== Results ==
Candidate	Vote Count	Percent
Steve Fulop	29,739	77.54%
Bill Matsikoudis	8,559	22.32%
Personal Choice	50	0.14%
