= 2017 Westchester County Executive election =

- November 7, 2017
- Turnout: 36.7% ▲
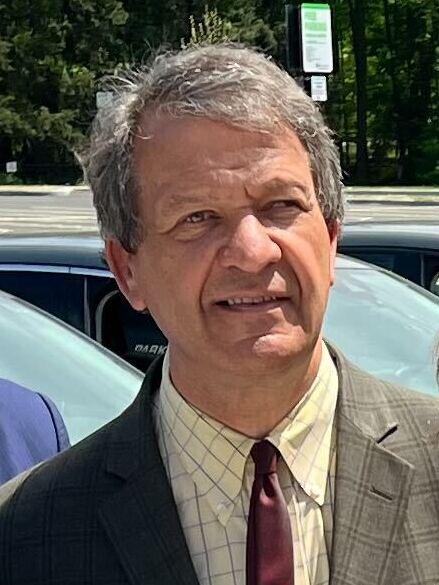

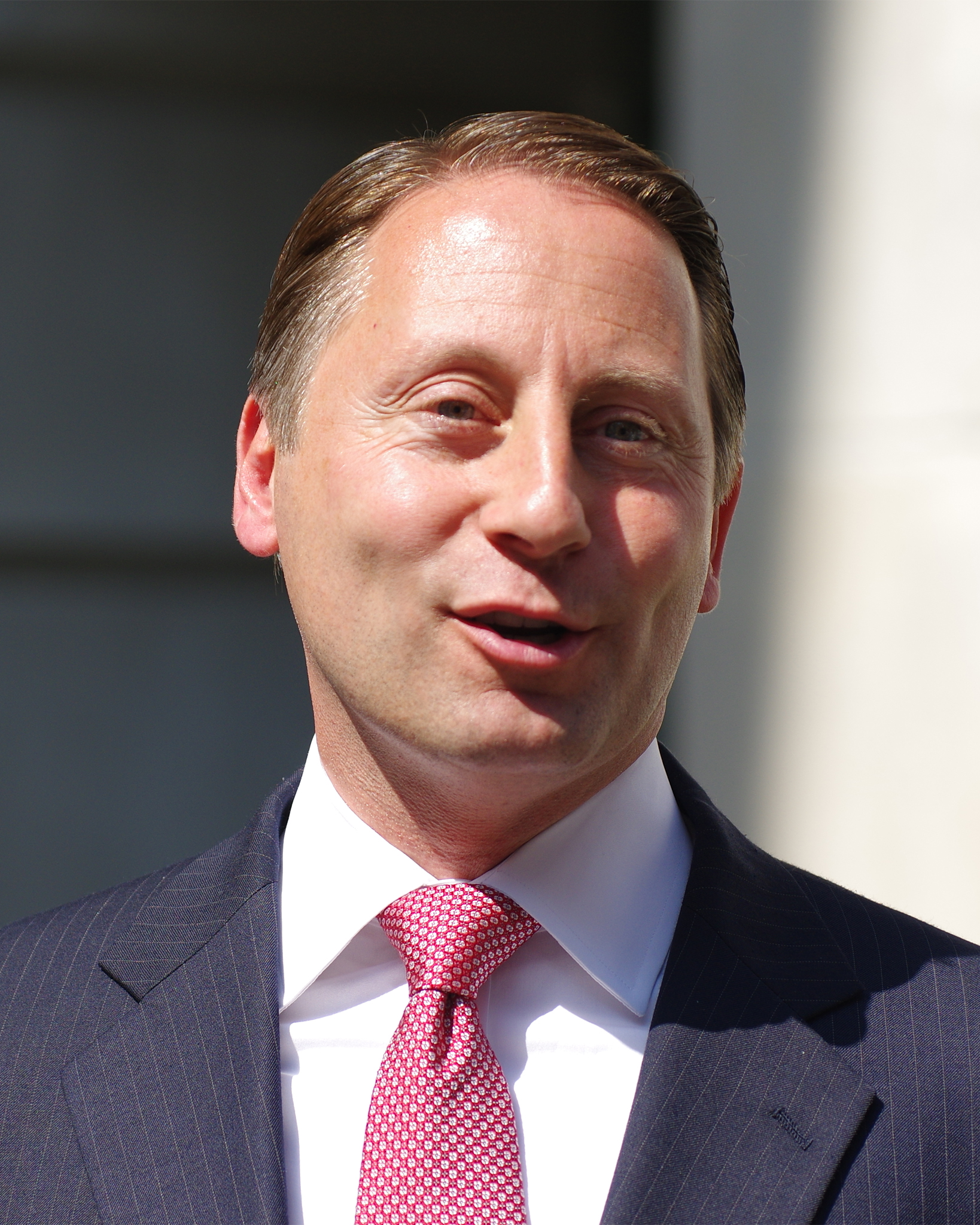
Candidate	George Latimer	Rob Astorino
Party	Democratic	Republican
Popular vote	124,273	95,370
Percentage	56.6%	43.4%
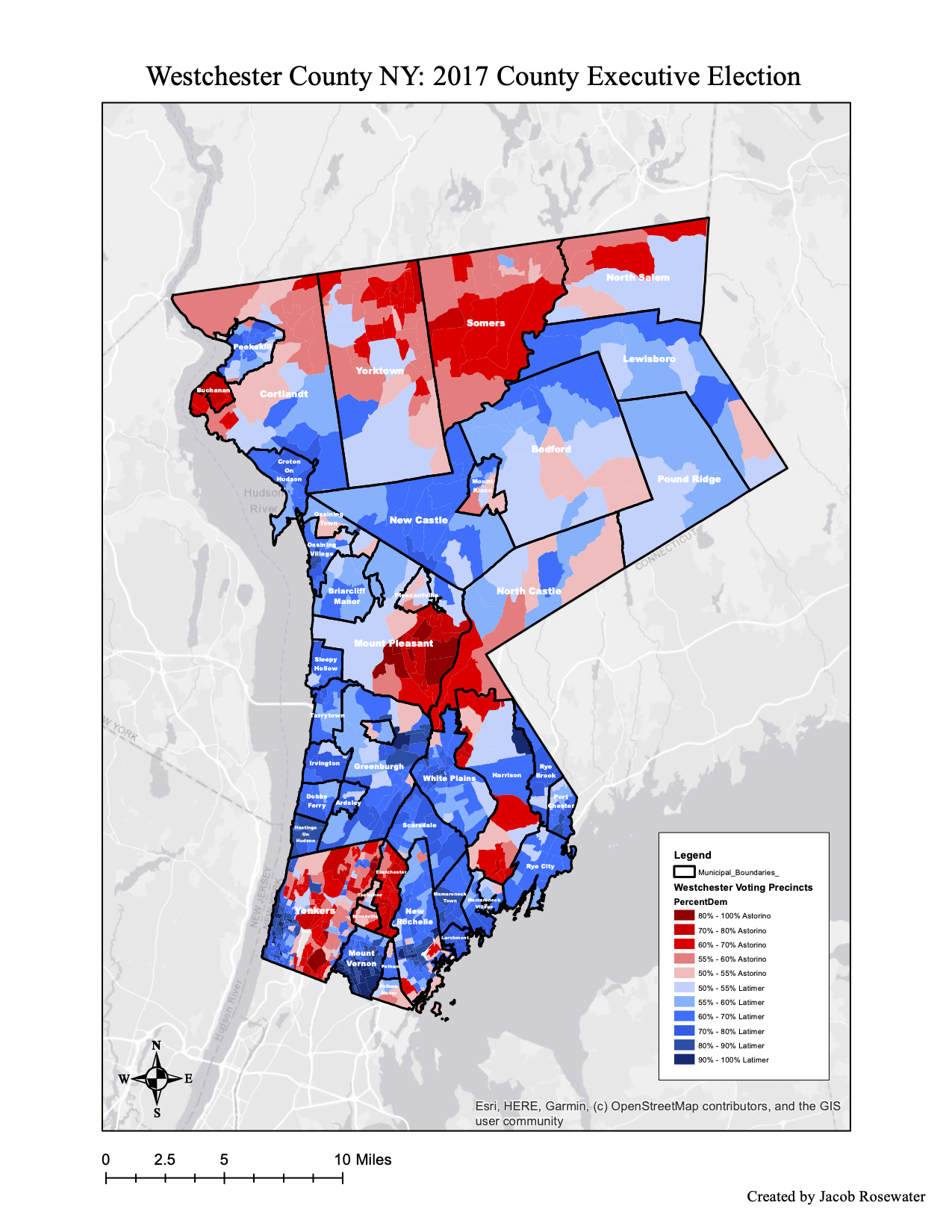
County Executive before election
Rob Astorino
Republican
Elected County Executive
George Latimer
Democratic

The 2017 Westchester County Executive election was held on November 7, 2017. After a primary in September, State Senator George Latimer was chosen as the Democratic Party candidate to challenge incumbent County Executive Rob Astorino. Latimer defeated Astorino 56.6% to 43.4%. The County Executive race took place alongside elections for the county legislature.

== Primaries ==
=== Democratic ===
Westchester county Executive, 2017 Democratic Primary Election
Party	Candidate	Votes	%
Democratic	George S. Latimer	24,466	62.6
Democratic	Ken Jenkins	14,316	36.7
Total votes		39,057	100.0

== General election ==
2017 Westchester County Executive election
Party	Candidate	Votes	Percentage
Democratic	George S. Latimer	116,834	53.2%
Working Families	George S. Latimer	4,034	1.8%
Independence	George S. Latimer	2,214	1.0%
Women's Equality	George S. Latimer	960	0.4%
Reform	George S. Latimer	231	0.1%
Total	George S. Latimer	124,273	56.6%
Republican	Rob Astorino	82,929	37.8%
Conservative	Rob Astorino	12,441	5.7%
Total	Rob Astorino (incumbent)	95,370	43.4%
Majority		28,903	13.2%
Totals		219,764	100.0%
Democratic gain from Republican			
