= Wade Kapszukiewicz =

American politician

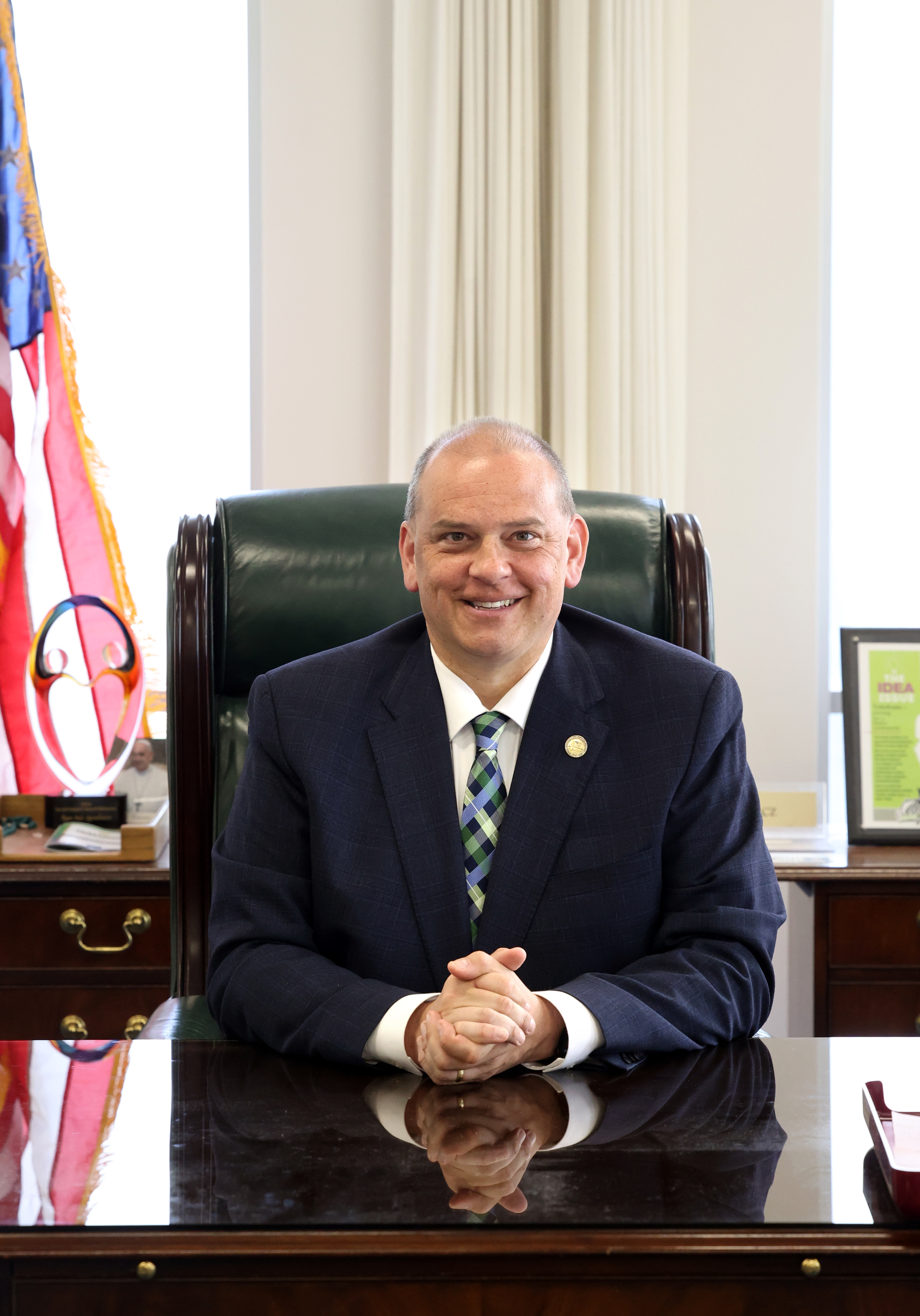

64th Mayor of Toledo
- Incumbent
- Assumed office January 2, 2018
- Preceded by: Paula Hicks-Hudson

Treasurer of Lucas County, Ohio
- In office 2005–2018

Personal details
- Born: October 30, 1972 (age 53) San Diego, California, U.S.
- Party: Democratic
- Spouse: Sarah Weglian (m. 2001)
- Children: 2
- Education: Marquette University (BA); University of Michigan (MPP)
- Website: Campaign website Official website

Wade Kapszukiewicz (/ˌkæpsəˈkɛvɪtʃ/ KAP-sə-KEV-itch; born October 30, 1972) is an American politician currently serving as the 64th mayor of Toledo, Ohio. A member of the Democratic Party, he was previously the treasurer of Lucas County, Ohio.

== Early life and education ==
Kapszukiewicz has Polish ancestry. He was born in San Diego, California, where his father was stationed in the U.S. Navy. After his father's service ended, the family moved back to Toledo. Kapszukiewicz earned a bachelor's degree in journalism and political science from Marquette University in 1994 and was named the valedictorian of the College of Communication, Journalism, and Performing Arts. He received a master's degree in public policy from the University of Michigan in 1996.

== Career ==
=== Early elected office ===
Kapszukiewicz was the Lucas County treasurer from 2005 until 2018. As Treasurer, he established the Lucas County Land Bank and was its chairman from 2010 to 2019. He spent one term on the Lucas County Board of Education and was later a Toledo city councilman for nearly seven years. He was first elected to City Council in 1999 and then re-elected in 2001 and 2003. Aged 26, he was the youngest member of the legislative body in 25 years.

=== Mayor of Toledo ===
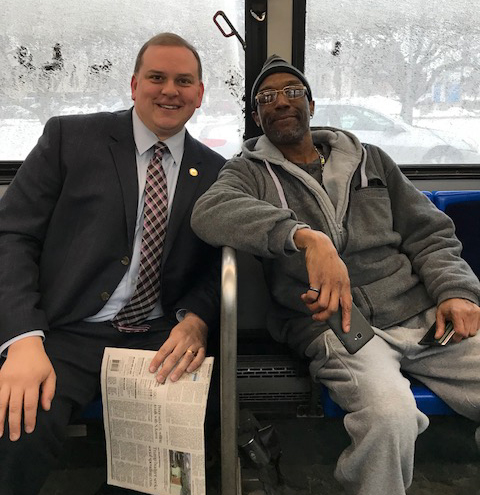
Kapszukiewicz takes the TARTA to work once a week

In his first term as mayor, Kapszukiewicz achieved all of his administration’s top goals. He successfully:

- created a regional water system, ensuring long-term affordable water rates while sharing decision-making authority with suburban partners,
- increased the size of the police force,
- restored discipline to the city’s budget, turning a $3 million dollar deficit into a more than $40 million surplus, even in the aftermath of the COVID-19 pandemic,
- improved educational opportunities for Toledo’s youngest residents through the Hope Toledo partnership at no additional cost to taxpayers,
- improved delivery of city services, such as increasing the number of roads repaired annually by nearly 15-fold,
- presided over a period of strong economic growth in Toledo, resulting in Site Selection magazine naming Toledo "first in the nation for economic development among mid-sized cities in 2020",
- launched a monthly "Wednesdays with Wade" public meetings series and corresponding a Wednesdays with Wade newsletter to encourage greater transparency in city government, reaching more than 60,000 residents weekly.

During his second term, Kapszukiewicz's work focused on investing resources and implementing the Toledo Recovery Plan. Among other improvements, the plan has continued to increase the size of safety forces, makes historic investments in youth programming and summer jobs, builds a YMCA in a historically disinvested neighborhood in the central city, creates new affordable housing, demolishes and rehabilitates blighted properties and improves and enhances city parks.

=== Work outside government ===
After receiving his master's degree, Kapszukiewicz worked for two years as the policy analysis and research director of the New Ohio Institute, a public policy research organization that studied issues affecting Ohio's urban areas. In April 1998, he accepted the position of manager of planning and development at the Lucas County Mental Health Board, where he worked until he became a member of Toledo City Council. While on the council, he taught a course in American government at Owens Community College and also worked at COMPASS, a social service agency that works with people with drug and alcohol addictions. Kapszukiewicz has been an adjunct professor at Lourdes University where he taught courses in urban policy.

=== Recognitions and awards ===
Kapszukiewicz was recognized in 2006 as a "20 Under 40" community leader and, in 2010, ESOP gave him its “Above and Beyond” award. In 2012, he was again honored by ESOP, this time earning its “Rooted in ESOP” award. The Toledo City Paper named him one of its "Big Idea Toledoans" in 2014 for his work creating and leading the Lucas County Land Bank, and again in 2018 for his commitment to pursue an ambitious agenda as mayor. In 2021, the U.S. Global Leadership Coalition awarded Kapszukiewicz its Global Statesman Award for his advocacy. In 2022, he was selected to participate in the Bloomberg Harvard City Leadership Initiative's sixth class of mayors.

An avid baseball fan, Kapszukiewicz published a 2016 article for the Society of American Baseball Research (SABR) in its Baseball Research Journal about the golden pitch, a rare situation in Game 7 of the World Series when the outcome of the pitch could result in a championship for either team. The research was nominated for a SABR Analytics Conference Research Award in 2017.

== Personal life ==
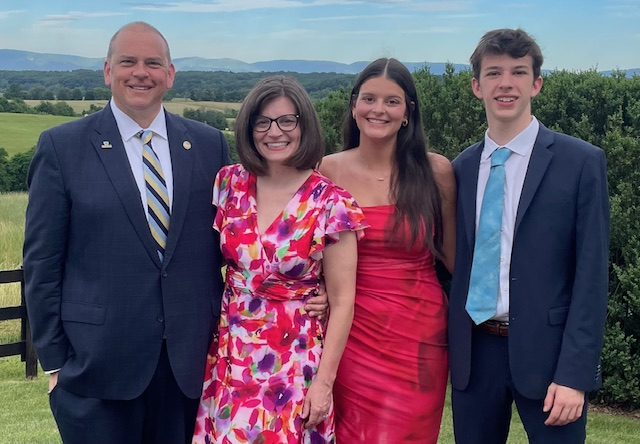
Mayor Wade Kapszukiewicz, his wife Sarah, and their two children Emma and Will

Kapszukiewicz is a parishioner at Gesu Roman Catholic Church. He and his wife, Sarah, were married in 2001. They live in the Old Orchard neighborhood of Toledo and have two children.

== Electoral history ==
Kapszukiewicz was first elected mayor of Toledo on November 7, 2017, defeating the incumbent mayor, Paula Hicks-Hudson. He received over 55 percent of the vote, winning by an 11 percent margin.

On November 2, 2021, Kapszukiewicz overwhelmingly won a second term by defeating the former mayor, Carty Finkbeiner, winning by a record margin with 68.9 percent of the vote. The previous record was set in 2005 when Finkbeiner himself defeated incumbent Jack Ford with 61.8 percent of the vote.

Kapszukiewicz was re-elected to a historic third term in the election held on November 4, 2025. He is the first mayor in the city's history to serve three consecutive four-year terms. This became possible after Toledo voters approved a charter amendment in November 2024 to raise the mayoral term limits from two to three consecutive terms. He won by a wide margin, earning 61% of the vote. His main opponent, Sylvania, Ohio resident Roberto Torres, received about 32% of the vote.

=== 2017 ===
Mayor of Toledo, General Election, 2017
Party	Candidate	Votes	%
Democratic	Wade Kapszukiewicz	28,546	55.45
Democratic	Paula Hicks-Hudson (inc.)	22,930	44.55
Total votes		51,476	100

=== 2021 ===
Mayor of Toledo, General Election, 2021
Party	Candidate	Votes	%
Democratic	Wade Kapszukiewicz (inc.)	24,061	68.91
Democratic	Carty Finkbeiner	10,377	29.72
Total votes		34,438	100

=== 2025 ===
Mayor of Toledo, General Election, 2025
Party	Candidate	Votes	%
Democratic	Wade Kapszukiewicz (inc.)	18,948	60.52
Independent	Roberto Torres	10,102	32.27
Total votes		31,308	100

Political offices
Preceded by Paula Hicks-Hudson	Mayor of Toledo, Ohio; 2018–present	Incumbent
