= Justin Brasch =

American lawyer and politician (born c. 1965)

Mayor of White Plains
- Incumbent
- Assumed office January 1, 2026
- Preceded by: Thomas Roach

Member of the White Plains Common Council
- In office January 1, 2018 – December 31, 2025

Personal details
- Born: c. 1965
- Party: Democratic
- Spouse: Juli Smith
- Children: 3
- Education: Williams College; Benjamin N. Cardozo School of Law
- Occupation: Lawyer, politician

Justin C. Brasch (born c. 1965) is an American lawyer and Democratic politician who is the mayor of White Plains, New York. He served two terms on the White Plains Common Council, including a period as council president, and was elected mayor in November 2025. He took office in January 2026, succeeding Thomas Roach, who had held the office since 2011. He is the city's first Orthodox Jewish mayor.

== Early life and education ==
Brasch grew up on the Upper West Side of Manhattan. One side of his family was Orthodox Jewish and the other Reform. After college he lived for several years with his Orthodox grandfather. At 17 he worked as an intern for Congressman Ted Weiss.

He attended Hunter College High School and Williams College, where he started a Young Democrats chapter, and spent his junior year at the University of Oxford. He graduated from the Benjamin N. Cardozo School of Law.

== Legal career ==
Brasch runs a small law practice in New York City, mainly in landlord–tenant and leasing law.

== Civic work ==
After college Brasch served on the political committee of the Sierra Club's New York City group and on the board of the Mid-Manhattan branch of the NAACP. He moved to White Plains with his wife in 2003. He served on the city Planning Board, the school board's budget advisory committee and the White Plains Multimodal Transportation Center task force, and spent about twelve years on the Westchester County Legislature's citizens budget advisory committee. He was a member of the executive committee of the New York State Democratic Party and a Democratic district leader for about twenty years.

== White Plains Common Council ==
In 2017 the White Plains Democratic City Committee endorsed Brasch for the Common Council, along with incumbents John Kirkpatrick and John Martin. He ran for the seat held by Councilwoman Beth Smayda, who did not seek re-election. The three endorsed candidates faced an unendorsed slate in the September Democratic primary, and Brasch, Kirkpatrick and Martin finished in the top three. He ran on the Democratic and Independence lines in November, and all three Democrats won. City Clerk Anne McPherson swore him in on December 27, 2017. He was re-elected in 2021.

Brasch served as council president and chaired the board of the White Plains Youth Bureau. During his time on the council, the city's affordable housing program was extended beyond the downtown business district to the rest of the city.

In October 2023 the council voted 4–3 to amend the city's noise ordinance and allow gas-powered leaf blowers each fall until a full ban took effect in December 2025. Brasch, Mayor Roach and Councilmember Victoria Presser voted against the amendment. In January 2025 the council voted unanimously to put the ban into effect immediately.

In 2023 Brasch endorsed Westchester County Executive George Latimer in a Democratic primary challenge to Representative Jamaal Bowman, citing Bowman's positions on Israel.

== Mayor of White Plains ==
=== 2025 election ===
Brasch announced his candidacy for mayor on January 8, 2025. Roach did not seek re-election and ran instead for Westchester County clerk. The White Plains Democratic City Committee endorsed Brasch.

In the June 24 Democratic primary he faced Nadine Hunt-Robinson, a council member from 2014 to 2023. Hunt-Robinson's campaign focused on overdevelopment and public safety, and Brasch's on affordable housing, climate resiliency and programs for young people and seniors. Preliminary results from the Westchester County Board of Elections gave Brasch 1,503 votes and Hunt-Robinson 1,053.

In the general election he faced Republican Lenny Lolis, a former city director of information services who had worked for White Plains for about 20 years. Lolis's campaign focused on transparency at City Hall, and Brasch's on affordable housing, green space and an intergenerational community center for young people and seniors. Brasch won on November 4, 2025, with about 70 percent of the vote.

=== Transition ===
In October 2025 a privately owned parking garage on Hale Avenue partly collapsed, and the city-owned Lexington Grove West garage was closed as unsafe. After the election Brasch announced a review of all parking garages in the city. He did not reappoint Public Safety Commissioner David Chong, who had held the post for 16 years.

=== Tenure ===
Brasch's term began on January 1, 2026. He was sworn in at a public ceremony at White Plains High School on January 2. New York Attorney General Letitia James administered the oath of office. He appointed Karen Pasquale as chief of staff, the first woman to hold the position, Wade Hardy as public safety commissioner and Joseph Castelli as deputy public safety commissioner. His stated priorities included affordable housing, parks, climate resiliency, support for immigrant communities, government transparency and an intergenerational community center.

The redevelopment of the former Galleria shopping mall, which closed in 2023, was among the issues facing the new administration. As mayor-elect, Brasch sought state funding for additional affordable apartments at the site. In March 2026 he asked the state to help raise the share of affordable units required in large projects, including the Galleria, from 12 percent to 25 percent. The 2026–27 state budget included funding for 500 workforce housing units at the Galleria site.

Brasch presented his first city budget, for the 2026–27 fiscal year, on April 21, 2026. The $230.3 million budget raised the property tax rate by about 2.9 percent per $1,000 of assessed value, partly because of higher pension costs for police, fire and civilian employees.

In April 2026 the city was completing plans to repair the east side of the Lexington Grove garage on Main Street. The city's inspection program for privately owned garages, based on a state rule requiring structural assessments every three years, covers 96 facilities.

== Personal life ==
Brasch and his wife, Juli Smith, have three children. Smith is a lawyer and a commissioner of the White Plains Housing Authority. Brasch is a Modern Orthodox Jew and a member of the Young Israel of White Plains and the Hebrew Institute of White Plains.

== Electoral history ==
2025 White Plains mayoral Democratic primary (preliminary)
Candidate	Votes
Justin Brasch	1,503
Nadine Hunt-Robinson	1,053

Political offices
Preceded by Thomas Roach	Mayor of White Plains, New York; 2026–present	Incumbent
