= Sy Schulman =

American politician

Mayor of White Plains, New York
- In office 1993 – December 31, 1997
- Preceded by: Alfred Del Vecchio
- Succeeded by: Joseph M. Delfino

Personal details
- Born: May 31, 1926 Brooklyn, New York
- Died: September 1, 2012 (aged 86) White Plains, New York
- Party: Democratic
- Spouse: Rosalind Schulman
- Children: Two sons
- Profession: Civil engineer

Seymour Jerome Schulman (May 31, 1926 – September 1, 2012) was an American civil engineer, planner, politician and academic. Schulman served as the Mayor of White Plains, New York, from 1993 to 1997.

== Biography ==
Schulman was born to Russian immigrant parents, Elias and Sarah Schulman, in Brooklyn, New York, in 1926. He graduated from Stuyvesant High School in Lower Manhattan. Schulman then served in the United States Navy from 1944 to 1946 during World War II. Schulman received a bachelor's degree in civil engineering from Cooper Union before completing a master's degree in urban planning at the Columbia Graduate School of Architecture, Planning and Preservation of Columbia University in 1954.

=== Career ===
Schulman became the chief planner and planning commissioner for Westchester County, New York, during the 1960s. Under his supervision, Westchester County acquired new land to build new public parks.

In 1968, Laurance Rockefeller, the chair of the New York State Council of Parks, asked and subsequently hired Schulman as the general manager of the state park's located within New York City.

He also served as the Urban Development Corporation's executive officer.

Schulman taught land-use planning, urban planning and planning law at major universities in the New York Metropolitan Area, including City College of New York, Columbia University, Pace University and the Pratt Institute.

Schulman was the founder and inaugural president of the Westchester County Association.

=== Political career ===
Schulman served as a member, including a stint as the chairman, of the White Plains Planning Board before entering elective politics.

He did not run for public office until he was 65 years old, when he was elected to the White Plains Common Council starting in 1992. He served on the city's Common Council for two years, until he became Mayor of White Plains in 1993.

As mayor, Schulman spearheaded efforts to attract new companies and developers to White Plains. He focused on expanding the city's tax base and successfully persuaded major companies, including Nine West, to relocate their corporate headquarters to White Plains. Schulman oversaw the 1995 opening of The Westchester, a new upscale shopping mall in downtown White Plains, during his tenure. The Westchester helped to re-establish White Plains as Westchester County's shopping mecca, following the decline of White Plains' two older malls, the White Plains Mall and The Galleria at White Plains. The city's property taxes were not raised during his four-year tenure.

Schulman considered his biggest achievement as mayor to be the "White Plains Vision," a committee of 400 White Plains residents who studied proposals for downtown development, housing and infrastructure.

Schulman remained active in local and Democratic Party politics after leaving the mayor's office in 1997. He openly criticized the policies of his successors if he disagreed with them on policy issues. In 2010 and 2011, Schulman joined with other former White Plains mayors to call for the resignation of then Mayor Adam Bradley over allegations of spousal abuse. Bradley resigned in February 2011.

Schulman was diagnosed with pancreatic cancer in February 2012. He died at his home in White Plains on September 1, 2012, at the age of 86. Schulman was survived by his wife of 65 years, Rosalind Schulman, and their two sons, Ethan Schulman and Dan Schulman.

His funeral was held at the Bet Am Shalom Synagogue in White Plains. The six speakers at the funeral included his son, Dan; New York Times editor and reporter, Joseph Berger; and Milt Hoffman, the former editor of The Journal News. Other dignitaries in attendance at the funeral were U.S. Rep. Nita Lowey, White Plains Mayor Thomas Roach, former White Plains Mayor Adam Bradley and White Plains Public Safety Commissioner David Chong. He was buried in the Sharon Gardens of Kensico Cemetery in Valhalla, New York.

== See also ==
- List of mayors of White Plains, New York
