= Kristen Browde =

American attorney, politician, and former journalist

- Education: Cornell University; Fordham University School of Law
- Occupations: Attorney; politician
- Political party: Democratic
- Website: browdelaw.com

Kristen Prata Browde is an American attorney, politician, and former journalist. She has been involved in local politics in New York and Florida and has advocated for the LGBTQ+ community since leaving journalism in 2013.

Browde worked in television and radio journalism, with a stint helping start CNN in the 1980s and 30 years as a reporter at NBC 4 News and CBS News in New York. She began concurrently working as an attorney after graduating from law school in 2000.

Since leaving news media, Browde has continued to practice law and has been active in local politics as a member of the Democratic Party. She has held various positions in New Castle, New York, and countywide positions in Westchester County. She was narrowly defeated in the 2017 election for town supervisor of New Castle (a position equivalent to mayor) and the 2020 Democratic primary election for New York's 93rd State Assembly district. Her candidacy for town supervisor made her the first transgender person to run for office on a major party ticket in New York.

== Early life and education ==
Kristen Prata Browde is one of three children of Anatole Browde (d. 2012) and Frances Buchman Browde (d. 1980). Anatole Browde, of St. Louis, Missouri, was vice president of McDonnell Douglas Electronic Systems and Micro-Electronic CTR, and he later taught at Maryville University in Missouri.

Kristen Browde attended Country Day high school in St. Louis in the late 1960s. She graduated from Cornell University in New York in 1972. At Cornell, she was a radio presenter on the university's radio station, WVBR-FM, and she played intramural hockey.

== Career ==
=== Journalism career and foray into law ===
Browde first worked in radio new after graduating college, and first moved to television at station WNEW-TV (now WNYW-TV) in 1976. She worked for the Independent Television News Association (ITNA), a satellite news cooperative, and then joined the fledgling CNN as a Washington and Pentagon correspondent by 1980. She was also the network's first Supreme Court correspondent.

Browde later rejoined WNYW-TV (then known as WNEW-TV when owned by Metromedia). In 1984, she was reporting for the station when she recorded remarks by vice-presidential candidate George H. W. Bush at a Republican Party rally boasting about his performance in the presidential debates earlier that week, not aware that he was being recorded by a television crew. In 1986, Browde and two other reporters were summoned by police to a Bronx building that Larry Davis was holding out in. In a six-hour telephone exchange with the police, Davis negotiated that news reporters be present at the scene so he would not be shot. Davis surrendered to police after he was assured of the presence of his girlfriend and given the press credentials of the reporters. Browde left WNYW three years later, in 1989, and later that year joined the syndicated news magazine Hard Copy in the role of segment producer. In 1993, Browde and three colleagues won the "Single Breaking News Story" award at the New York Emmy Awards for the news story "Watermain Break, Grand Central" for the Tribune-owned station WPIX-TV. She worked as a freelance reporter for NBC 4 News (WNBC) for 8 months in 1993 before she was appointed to a full reporter position there.

In 1996, while working at WNBC, Browde started attending the night school program at Fordham University School of Law, initially motivated by the desire to become a better reporter. Executives at NBC decided not to renew Browde's contract because they felt she could not handle the stresses of working as a journalist while attending law school. She left WNBC in late 1996, after three years at the station. She later began freelance work for CBS News, where she was a weekend news anchor and a correspondent. She graduated from Fordham Law in 2000, just before she turned 50 years old. She chose to continue working as a journalist, while personally selecting what legal cases she would work on as an attorney: "I knew that I could truly have my cake and eat it too—without taking a big pay cut by becoming a first-year associate. Thus, it wasn't a really tough call."

=== Labor union activities (1983–2012) ===
Browde was a member of the national board of the American Federation of Television and Radio Artists (AFTRA) from 1983 to 2012 (when the union was merged with the Screen Actors Guild).

In 2006, Browde was elected as a trustee to the AFTRA Health & Retirement Funds. In 2010, TheWrap and The Hollywood Reporter reported that several Screen Actors Guild (SAG) members had accused Browde of running a union news website, SAGWatch, and abusing her access to SAG's confidential information as an AFTRA trustee. Browde told The Hollywood Reporter that the allegations were false. A two-month investigation by AFTRA led the union to conclude that there was "no evidence suggesting any infractions took place". In 1999 and 2003, Browde publicly expressed her opposition to the merger of SAG and AFTRA. When the unions were merged in 2012 to create SAG-AFTRA, she was appointed one of the 24 members of the initial SAG-AFTRA national executive committee.

=== Legal career ===
By 2013, Browde was practicing as a divorce attorney in Chappaqua, a hamlet in New Castle. Browde left CBS News around that time; in an interview, she said that by that time her law practice had been "going strong, completely blossomed". She came out as a transgender woman to the public at the Inner Circle's gala of New York journalists in April 2016. The New York Post's gossip section, Page Six, ran a print article on Browde's announcement with the headline "Journo Says He's a She". Browde said her practice was unaffected after she came out.

Browde has served on the board of the LGBT Bar Association of New York (LeGaL), a bar association serving the LGBTQ community, and she was elected president of its board in 2019. She was the first transgender person to hold the position. She is also a founding member of the National Trans Bar Association, and she was elected a co-chair of the organization in 2019. In 2019, she was among at least a dozen transgender attorneys present for oral arguments before the Supreme Court for R.G. & G.R. Harris Funeral Homes Inc. v. Equal Employment Opportunity Commission, a landmark case for the rights of transgender people.

== Political activities and activism ==
=== Early activities (2013–2017) ===
Browde became active in politics after she left the news industry in 2013 with the desire to "break free from the restraint of public neutrality." She served as secretary of the ethics board of New Castle, New York, from 2014 until she resigned in 2017 to run for town supervisor. She also served on the Financial Advisory Committee for the Chappaqua Central School District starting in 2013, and she was appointed to the town diversity committee in 2016.

Browde supported the Hillary Clinton 2016 presidential campaign, and campaigned in North Carolina in support of the Clinton campaign and in opposition to the Public Facilities Privacy & Security Act (House Bill 2), a bathroom bill. Browde participated in the Women's March in Washington, D.C. after the inauguration of Donald Trump, during which she marched with the National Center for Transgender Equality.

=== New Castle supervisor campaign and other activities (2017–2019) ===
In April 2017, Browde announced she would be running as a Democratic Party candidate for town supervisor of New Castle, (Note: The position of New Castle town supervisor is equivalent to mayor.) making her the first transgender person in New York to run for office on a major party ticket. Browde and the other Democratic Party candidates for New Castle Town Board were members of Up2Us, a group which rose from the Chappaqua Friends of Hillary (a group supporting presidential candidate and Chappaqua resident Hillary Clinton). Hillary Clinton herself endorsed the Democratic Party town board candidates, including Browde. Robert Greenstein, the incumbent town supervisor and the Republican Party candidate, led by a 300-vote margin over Browde in unofficial vote counts late in the November election and narrowly defeated Browde.

From 2017 to 2018, Browde served on the transition team of county executive of Westchester County, George Latimer. In 2018, she was one of 15 nominations to the Westchester Women's Advisory Board, a board which advises the government of Westchester County on women's issues, with her term lasting through 2019. Also in 2018, state governor Andrew Cuomo appointed her to the steering committee of New York State Council on Women and Girls. In 2019, she sat alongside the governor at an event during which the governor signaled his support for the Gender Expression Non-Discrimination Act and for changes to the state's gestational surrogacy laws.

=== New York State Assembly campaign (2020) ===
In the 2020 New York State Assembly election, Browde was one of five candidates in the Democratic Party primary for New York's 93rd State Assembly district, a seat held by David Buchwald. Browde said that frustration around issues such as gun control motivated her to run for the assembly. Bedford town supervisor Chris Burdick narrowly defeated Browde in the primary; unofficial tallies counted 4,879 votes for Burdick compared to 4,532 votes for Browde (a difference of 347 votes). Later that year, Browde was appointed as one of 12 vice chairs of the Westchester County Democratic Party.

Gay City News of New York City named Browde one of their 2020 Impact Award Honorees, describing her as "a change-maker who has made a difference on numerous fronts."

=== Florida Democratic Party (2023–present) ===
In 2023, Browde was reported to be vice president of the Florida Democratic Party LGBTQ+ Caucus. Early that year, Browde began to publish weekly videos on TikTok highlighting people who have been arrested on charges of child sexual abuse that week in an effort to prove that drag queens are not threats to children (a notion associated with the ongoing drag panic). Browde's videos have been featured by LGBT media outlets PinkNews and Them. Her inspiration for the video series came from a speech by the outgoing president of the caucus, during which he read a list of people arrested or charged for child sexual abuse in the past week. By March 2023, Browde's first video on the subject had been viewed 1.4 million times, and her TikTok account had amassed more than 300,000 followers. In 2024, she assumed the Presidency of the Florida LGBTQ+ Democratic Caucus, and was elected Vice President of the National Federation of Stonewall Democrats.

== Personal life ==
In 1980, Browde was engaged to Bettina Gregory, an ABC News correspondent. They were married by the following year. In 1988, Browde was engaged to Elizabeth J. Hellawell. Their marriage later ended in a divorce. In 1999, Browde married film director Elizabeth Schub in Long Island, New York. The couple was living on the east side of Broadway in New York City when the nearby World Trade Center was destroyed in the September 11 attacks in 2001. They told Cornell Alumni Magazine that they were "lucky to be alive." Browde moved to New Castle, New York in 2004.

Browde has two children. Her son Maximilian Browde and Maximilian's mother, Elizabeth Schub Kamir, were living in Paris at the time of the November 2015 terrorist attacks in the city. Maximilian wrote about his experience in an article published by The Journal News (LoHud.com).

Browde took the middle name Prata after her friend and coach, Monica Prata, a feminine image consultant based in Greenwich Village.

== See also ==
- LGBTQ culture in New York City
- List of LGBTQ people from New York City
- List of transgender public officeholders in the United States
