= New York's 93rd State Assembly district =

American legislative district

Assemblymember
Chris Burdick; D–Bedford

New York's 93rd State Assembly district is one of the 150 districts in the New York State Assembly. It has been represented by Chris Burdick since 2021.

== Geography ==
District 93 is in Westchester County. It includes the towns of Bedford, Harrison, Lewisboro, Mount Kisco, New Castle, North Castle, North Salem, Pound Ridge and half of White Plains.

The district overlaps (partially) with New York's 16th and 17th congressional districts, and the 37th and 40th districts of the New York State Senate.

== Recent election results ==
=== 2026 ===
2026 New York State Assembly election, District 93
Party	Candidate	Votes	%
Democratic	Chris Burdick (incumbent)		
Republican	Braille Diaz		
Conservative	Braille Diaz		
Total	Braille Diaz		
Write-in			
Total votes			

=== 2024 ===
2024 New York State Assembly election, District 93
Party	Candidate	Votes	%
Democratic	Chris Burdick	45,219	
Working Families	Chris Burdick	3,778	
Total	Chris Burdick (incumbent)	48,997	99.7
Write-in		161	0.3
Total votes		49,158	100.0
Democratic hold			

=== 2022 ===
2022 New York State Assembly election, District 93
Party	Candidate	Votes	%
Democratic	Chris Burdick	31,428	
Working Families	Chris Burdick	1,734	
Total	Chris Burdick (incumbent)	33,162	63.2
Republican	Gary Lipson	17,897	
Conservative	Gary Lipson	1,440	
Total	Gary Lipson	19,337	36.8
Write-in		13	0.0
Total votes		52,512	100.0
Democratic hold			

=== 2020 ===
2020 New York State Assembly election, District 93
Primary election
Party	Candidate	Votes	%
Democratic	Chris Burdick	4,883	33.8
Democratic	Kristen Browde	4,533	31.3
Democratic	Jeremiah Frei-Pearson	2,751	19.0
Democratic	Alex Roithmayr	1,212	8.4
Democratic	Mark Jaffe	1,078	7.4
Write-in		15	0.1
Total votes		14,472	100
General election
Democratic	Chris Burdick	40,438	
Working Families	Chris Burdick	2,621	
Independence	Chris Burdick	455	
Total	Chris Burdick	43,514	65.7
Republican	John Nuculovic	20.783	
Conservative	John Nuculovic	1,898	
Total	John Nuculovic	22,681	34.3
Write-in		22	0.0
Total votes		66,217	100.0
Democratic hold			

=== 2018 ===
2018 New York State Assembly election, District 93
Party	Candidate	Votes	%
Democratic	David Buchwald	33,543	
Working Families	David Buchwald	781	
Independence	David Buchwald	754	
Women's Equality	David Buchwald	347	
Reform	David Buchwald	109	
Total	David Buchwald (incumbent)	35,534	69.3
Republican	John Nuculovic	13,964	
Conservative	John Nuculovic	1,796	
Total	John Nuculovic	15,760	30.7
Write-in		20	0.0
Total votes		51,314	100.0
Democratic hold			

=== 2016 ===
2016 New York State Assembly election, District 93
Party	Candidate	Votes	%
Democratic	David Buchwald	37,640	
Working Families	David Buchwald	1,792	
Independence	David Buchwald	1,617	
Women's Equality	David Buchwald	590	
Total	David Buchwald (incumbent)	41,639	99.5
Write-in		226	0.5
Total votes		41,865	100.0
Democratic hold			

=== 2014 ===
2014 New York State Assembly election, District 93
Party	Candidate	Votes	%
Democratic	David Buchwald	18,956	
Independence	David Buchwald	2,050	
Working Families	David Buchwald	1,907	
Total	David Buchwald (incumbent)	22,913	99.4
Write-in		136	0.6
Total votes		23,049	100.0
Democratic hold			

=== 2012 ===
2012 New York State Assembly election, District 93
Party	Candidate	Votes	%
Democratic	David Buchwald	27,408	
Working Families	David Buchwald	1,160	
Independence	David Buchwald	826	
Total	David Buchwald	29,394	54.4
Republican	Robert Castelli	22,386	
Conservative	Robert Castelli	2,223	
Total	Robert Castelli (incumbent)	24,609	45.6
Write-in		20	0.0
Total votes		54,023	100.0
Democratic gain from Republican			
