= Isaac Young =

Isaac Young may refer to:

- Isaac D. Young (1849–1927), U.S. Congressman
- Isaac Young House, a wood-frame house in New Castle, New York, listed on the National Register of Historic Places
