= Robert Castelli =

American politician (1949–2024)

Robert J. Castelli
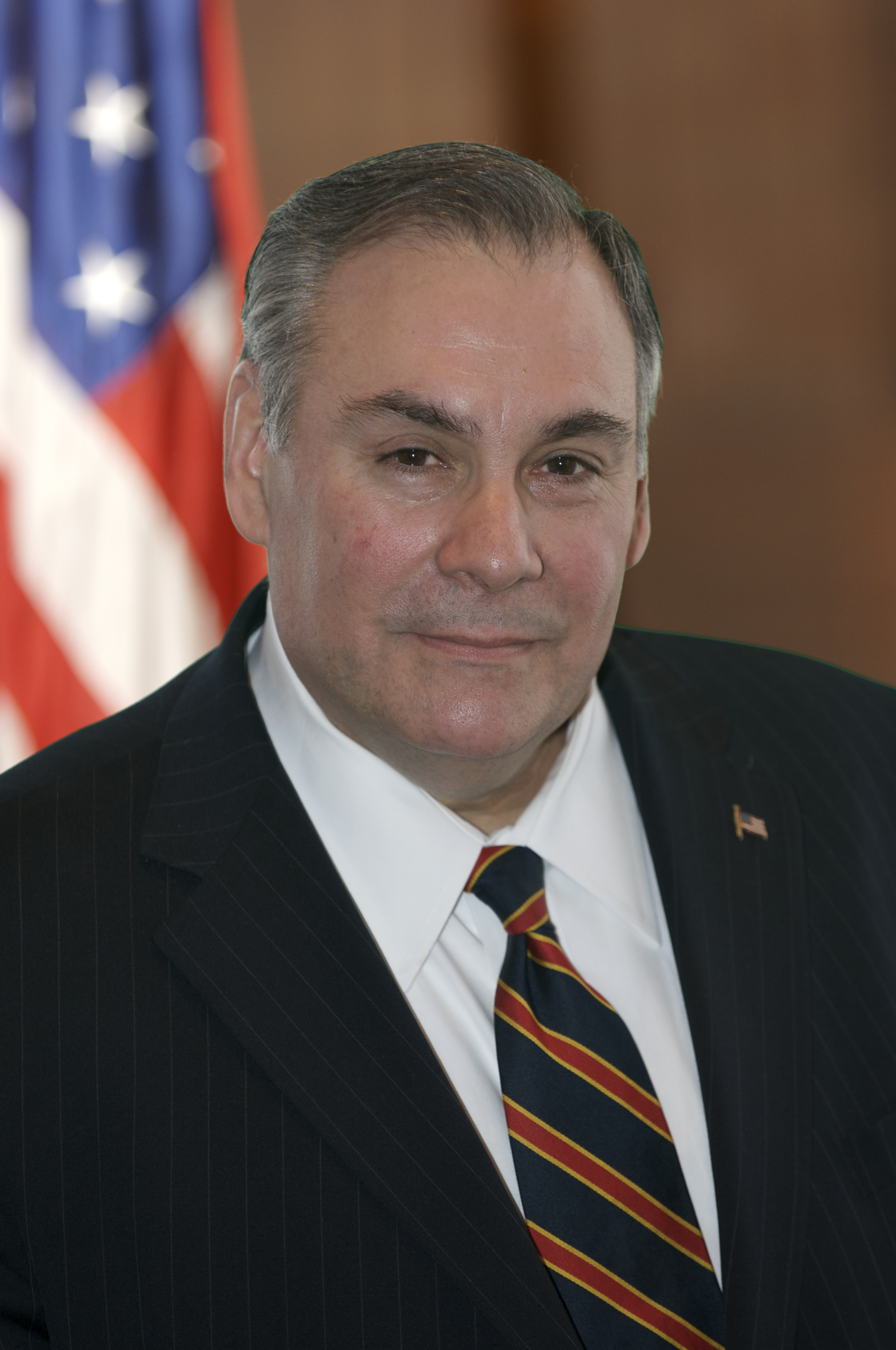

Member of the New York State Assembly from the 89th district
- In office February 2010 – January 2013
- Preceded by: Adam Bradley
- Succeeded by: David Buchwald (redistricting)

Town Councilman Lewisboro, New York
- In office 2000–2004

Personal details
- Born: December 16, 1949 Jamaica, New York, U.S.
- Died: May 21, 2024 (aged 74) Somers, New York, U.S.
- Party: Republican
- Occupation: State Legislator; College Professor; Security Consultant

Military service
- Branch/service: United States Army
- Years of service: 1967–1973
- Rank: Sergeant
- Battles/wars: Vietnam War

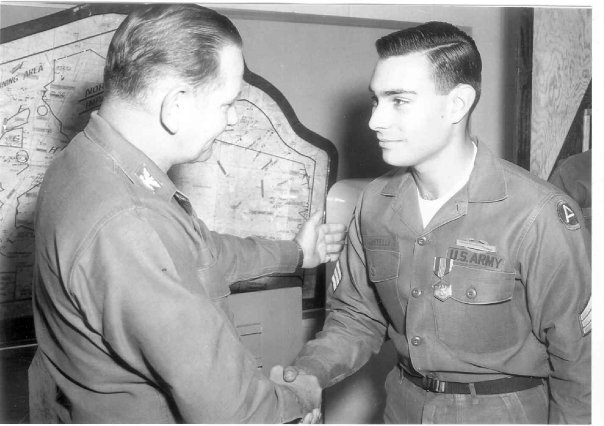
In 1969 at right, Castelli receives the Army Commendation Medal.

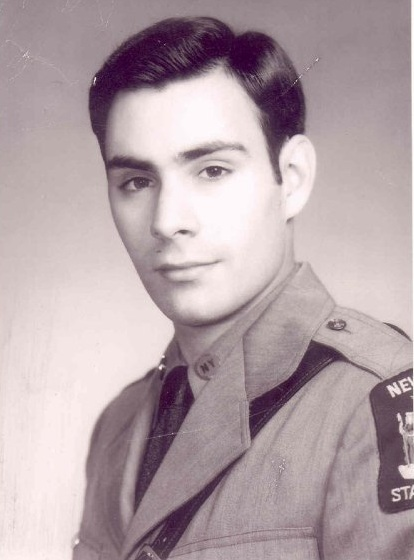
A 1975 photo of Castell as a State Trooper.

Robert J. Castelli (December 16, 1949 – May 21, 2024) was an American security consultant, academic, and media personality from Goldens Bridge, New York. He served two terms as a member of the New York State Assembly, representing northeastern Westchester County, New York.

During the Vietnam War, he served with the 7th Cavalry Regiment in the United States Army. Upon his separation from the military, he became a member of the New York State Police, where he served with the elite Special Investigations Unit and the New York State Organized Crime Task Force for over two decades.

A graduate of Harvard Kennedy School, Castelli became an educator in 1996 and went on to serve as Chair of the Criminal Justice Department at Iona College. After holding elective office in local government, Castelli ran for and was elected to the State Assembly in a special election in February 2010. He was also a columnist for the website Politico and served as the shooting instructor at the Camp-Fire Club of America.

Castelli died on May 21, 2024, at the age of 74.

== Early life and military career ==
Castelli was born in Jamaica, New York. He dropped out of high school in 1967 and volunteered to join the United States Army, and was assigned to the 1st Air Cavalry Division as an infantryman. He served in combat operations in the Republic of Vietnam from 1968 to 1969. He received an honorable discharge in 1973.

Upon his return from his Army service, he worked as a Constable in South Carolina before returning to New York and beginning a 21-year career in the New York State Police, during which he worked as an intelligence officer with elite Special Investigations Unit and the New York State Organized Crime Task Force. Castelli held the ranks of trooper, sergeant, investigator, and eventually was promoted to station commander. He was involved in numerous high-profile arrests during his tenure with the State Police.

Castelli had two sons, Christian, a retired Army Special Forces Colonel who was the 2022 Republican Party nominee in North Carolina's 6th congressional district, and Paul, an ordained Minister in Florida.

Castelli was a graduate of Palmer College, the Empire State College and Harvard Kennedy School, where he was named a Pickett Fellow in Criminal Justice Policy and Management by the National Institute of Justice in recognition of his contributions to the law enforcement community. He was also once a nationally ranked competitive sport shooter, and was a life member of the Explorers Club, and the Camp Fire Club, where he served as a shooting instructor.

After retiring from the State Police, he began a career as an educator, teaching at Iona College for thirteen years and rising to become Chairman of the Criminal Justice Department. He also worked as an adjunct professor at CUNY John Jay College of Criminal Justice and Marist College from 1996 to 2010, where he lectured on a wide variety of criminal justice and security-related subjects including criminal investigation, organized crime, white collar crime, terrorism, security management and police procedures.

These credentials made him a popular guest as an expert commentator in print, radio, and television media programs throughout the United States. Prior to his transition from public service to politics, Castelli was a regular contributor on network television including ABC, CBS, Fox News, CNN, MSNBC and Court TV. Castelli owned a professional security consulting business, and held certifications as a Certified Fraud Examiner, Crime Prevention Specialist, Certified Criminal Analyst, Certified Protection Professional, Certified Police and Security Officer Instructor, Certified Firearms Instructor and licensed and bonded Private Investigator.

== Political career ==
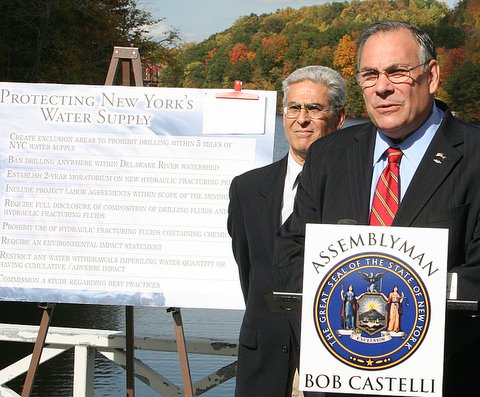
Castelli is joined by Assemblyman Steve Katz from the neighboring 99th Assembly District to call for a moratorium on 'hydro-fracking' for natural gas in the Croton Watershed, which covers both their districts.

A Republican, Castelli was elected as a town councilman in his hometown of Lewisboro from 2000 to 2004. He made his first run for the State Assembly in 2004.

From February 2010 to January 2013, he represented Westchester County in the New York State Legislature, which included the towns of Bedford, Harrison, Lewisboro, Mount Kisco, New Castle, North Castle, Pound Ridge and portions of the City of White Plains in Westchester County, New York.

=== 2010 special election ===
Castelli was elected to the New York State Assembly in a special election on February 9, 2010, defeating County Legislator Peter Harckham in an upset victory. The previous incumbent, Democratic Assemblyman Adam Bradley, had resigned after he was elected Mayor of White Plains in 2009. Castelli previously ran for the seat in 2004, but was defeated by Bradley.

Political prognosticators viewed the suburban contest as a sign of a Republican resurgence and a barometer for coming fall elections, where Republicans would eventually go on to make large gains in the United States Senate, House of Representatives, and retake the New York State Senate. Castelli described his victory as "an expression of voter discontent with the state capitol" and the corruption prevalent in New York's State Government.

=== 2010 general election ===
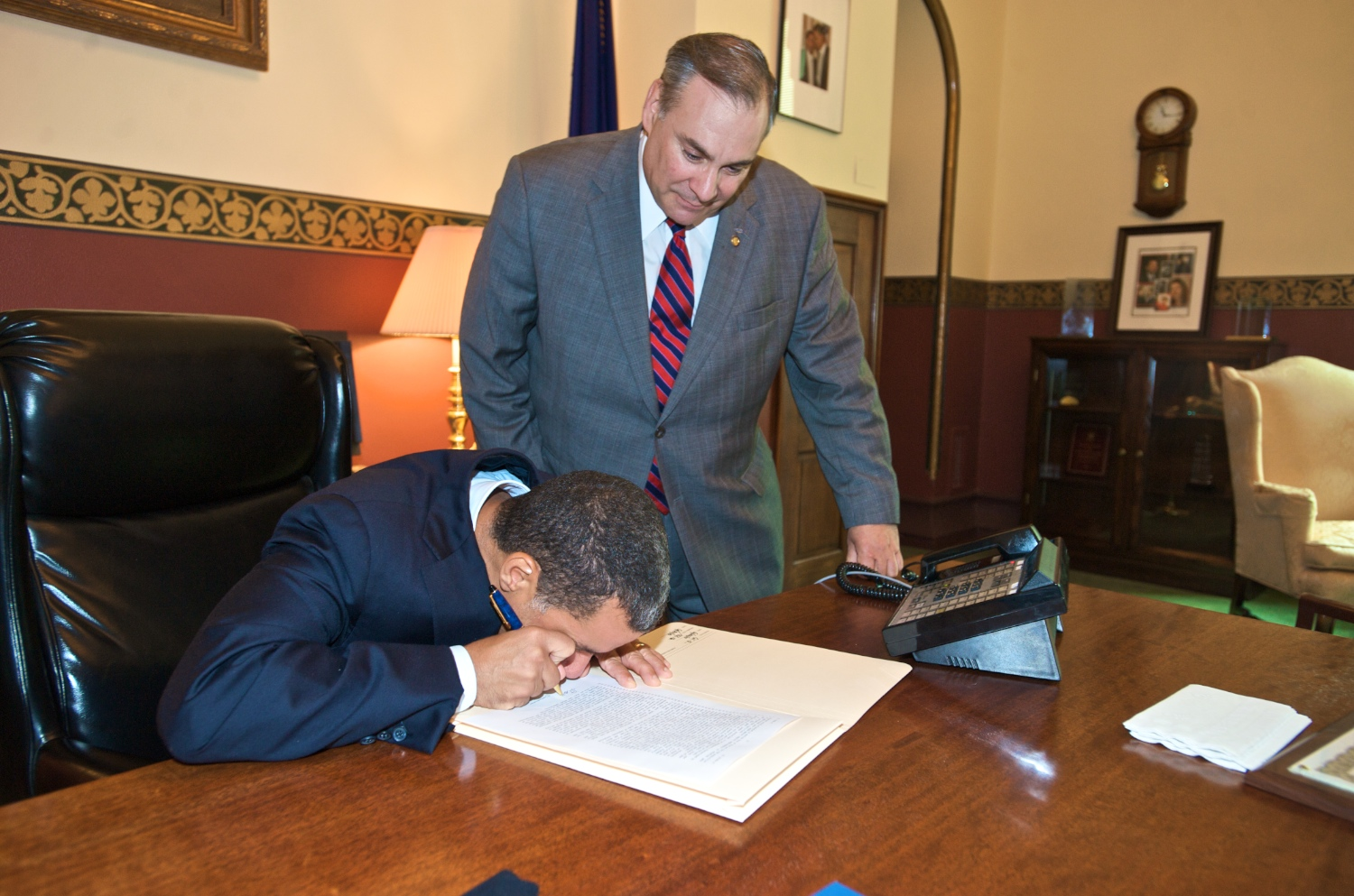
Former Governor of New York David Paterson signs Chapter 294 of the laws of 2010 in the Red Room of the State Capitol in Albany, the first law authored by Castelli, then a freshman legislator.

After serving for only eight months, the freshman legislator had to run for a full term. In the 2010 general election, Castelli held the seat by defeating White Plains City Council President Thomas Roach. Winning with a slim 112 vote margin, a month-long recount was necessary before Castelli could be declared the winner, thus earning him a full two-year term representing the 89th District. The 89th Assembly District has over 10,000 more registered Democrats than Republicans, and Castelli was the first Republican to hold the seat in seventeen years.

His 2010 election and subsequent reelection were considered significant, as the 89th Assembly District seat to which he was elected was gerrymandered to be a Democratic district, and was home to prominent Democratic political figures, including former U.S. President Bill Clinton, Secretary of State Hillary Clinton, Governor of New York Andrew Cuomo, attorney Robert F. Kennedy, Jr. and George Soros, billionaire financier of numerous progressive causes. Castelli was also outspent by his opponents, although he attempted to overcome these disadvantages by running what he called a "grassroots, front-porch campaign."

=== 2012 general election ===
As a Republican representing a heavily Democratic district, Castelli placed a large emphasis on bipartisanship. He decried the 2012 redistricting process as partisan gerrymandering, for which he was named a "Hero of Reform" by former New York City Mayor Ed Koch. Castelli voted against the final redistricting bill, which further gerrymandered and renumbered his district from the 89th to the 93rd Assembly District, added the town of North Salem, and significantly reoriented the portion of the City of White Plains contained within the district, which packed more Democratic-leaning voters into the already heavily Democratic district which Castelli, a member of the Republican Party, represented.

Castelli sought to earn a reputation as a reformer and frequently challenged Albany's infamous "dysfunction" in his campaign rhetoric. The press frequently said he is known for his independence from both parties. In an editorial endorsing Castelli, The New York Times called him "the kind out outsider Albany needs."

Sensing political opportunity following the redistricting process, White Plains City Councilman David Buchwald launched a challenge to Castelli, citing the district's overwhelming Democratic enrollment advantage. Castelli received endorsements from every newspaper in the district and aired television and radio ads featuring Democratic Governor Andrew Cuomo saying, "Assemblyman Castelli, I'll tell you how tough Assemblyman Castelli's job is. He is MY Assemblyman ... He's doing a great job representing me and this entire district."

This is not about loyalty to a political party. This is about representing the people who you represent, the people of this state in a very difficult time in this state's history and doing what's right for the people before your political party. We're Democrats, we're Republicans, we're independents, we're liberals, we're conservatives, we're New Yorkers first. Let's remember that and act that way, and that's the spirit of Assemblyman Castelli.

— Governor Andrew Cuomo

Despite running a spirited campaign where he was again outspent, Castelli could not overcome party-line voting in the high turnout for incumbent President Barack Obama, although he still managed to garner 47% of the vote in the overwhelmingly Democratic district.

Castelli ran for the New York State Senate for the 40th district in 2014, but lost the Republican primary to Terrence Murphy.

=== Political positions ===
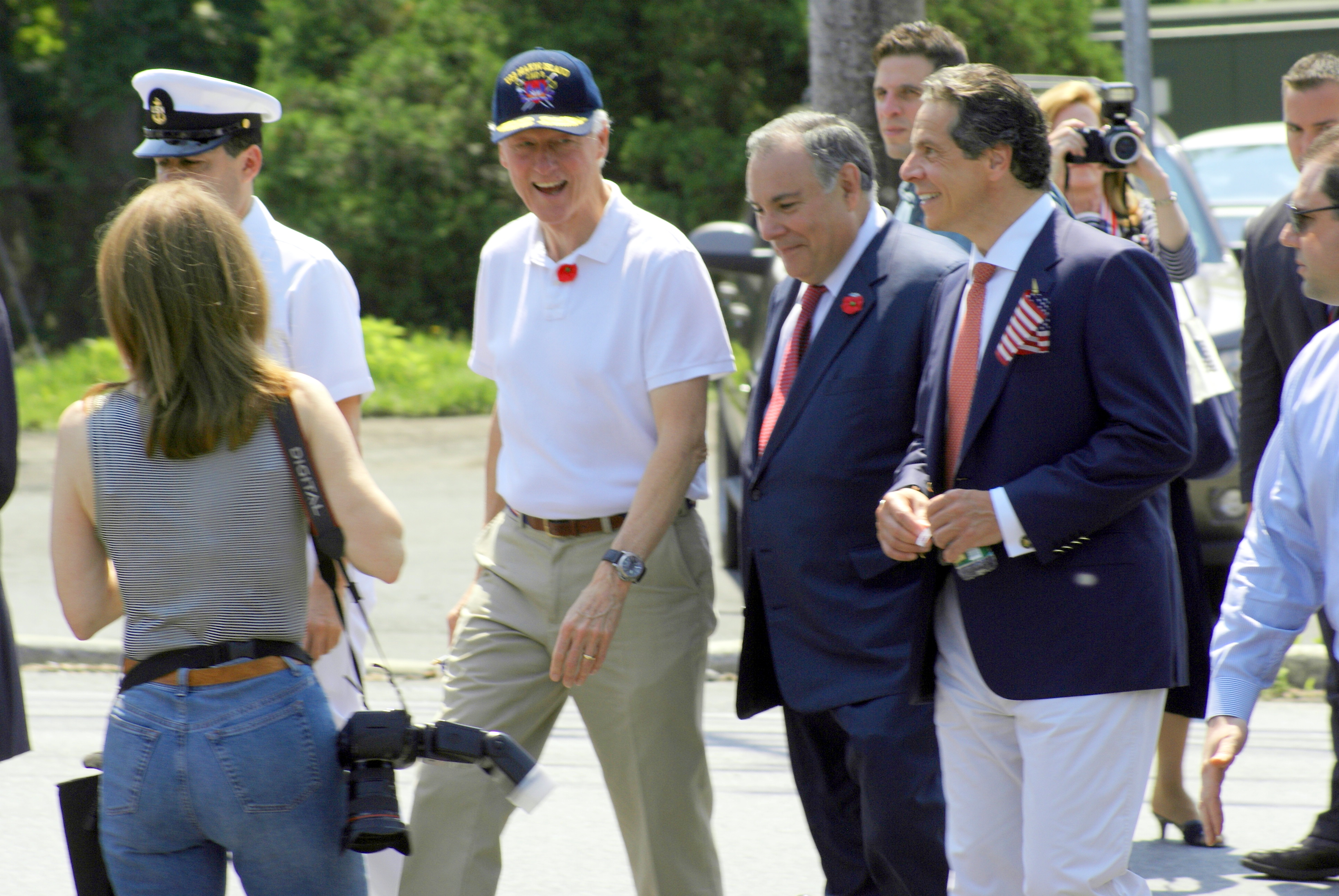
Former President of the United States Bill Clinton (left) and Governor of New York Andrew Cuomo (right) walk with Assemblyman Castelli (center), who represents their hometown of New Castle in the Assembly.

Castelli was known as a staunch fiscal conservative and held strong pro-business, anti-tax and limited government positions. Yet he also held environmentalist views considered atypical for most Republican politicians, and his pro-conservation ideals garnered him support and endorsements from organizations such as the League of Conservation Voters and Sierra Club during all of his campaigns. For instance, he was a cosponsor and vocal proponent of a ban on hydraulic fracturing in the Marcellus Shale region of upstate New York, a process for natural gas exploration which is known as "hydro-fracking."

Castelli received a perfect score on the environment from the statewide group EPL/Environmental Advocates in 2011 and 2012, on the only scorecard that grades New York State lawmakers according to their votes on the environment. His score led all Republican lawmakers in both houses in each of his three years in office.

A self-described conservationist, Castelli also received top marks from the New York State Rifle and Pistol Association for what they described as "his actions in defense of our civil rights," as well as from the New York State Farm Bureau, which named him to their prestigious "Circle of Friends."

According to Patch Media, a regional outlet covering the 89th Assembly District, he "earned a reputation for being an independent voice in the Legislature, especially on tax policies that he says unfairly penalize Westchester County residents and business owners."

As one of only three combat veterans in the State Assembly, he placed a large part of his legislative focus on veterans' issues. He was credited with building the coalition that saved the five New York State Veterans Homes from elimination in the 2011 New York State budget.

=== Legislative achievements ===
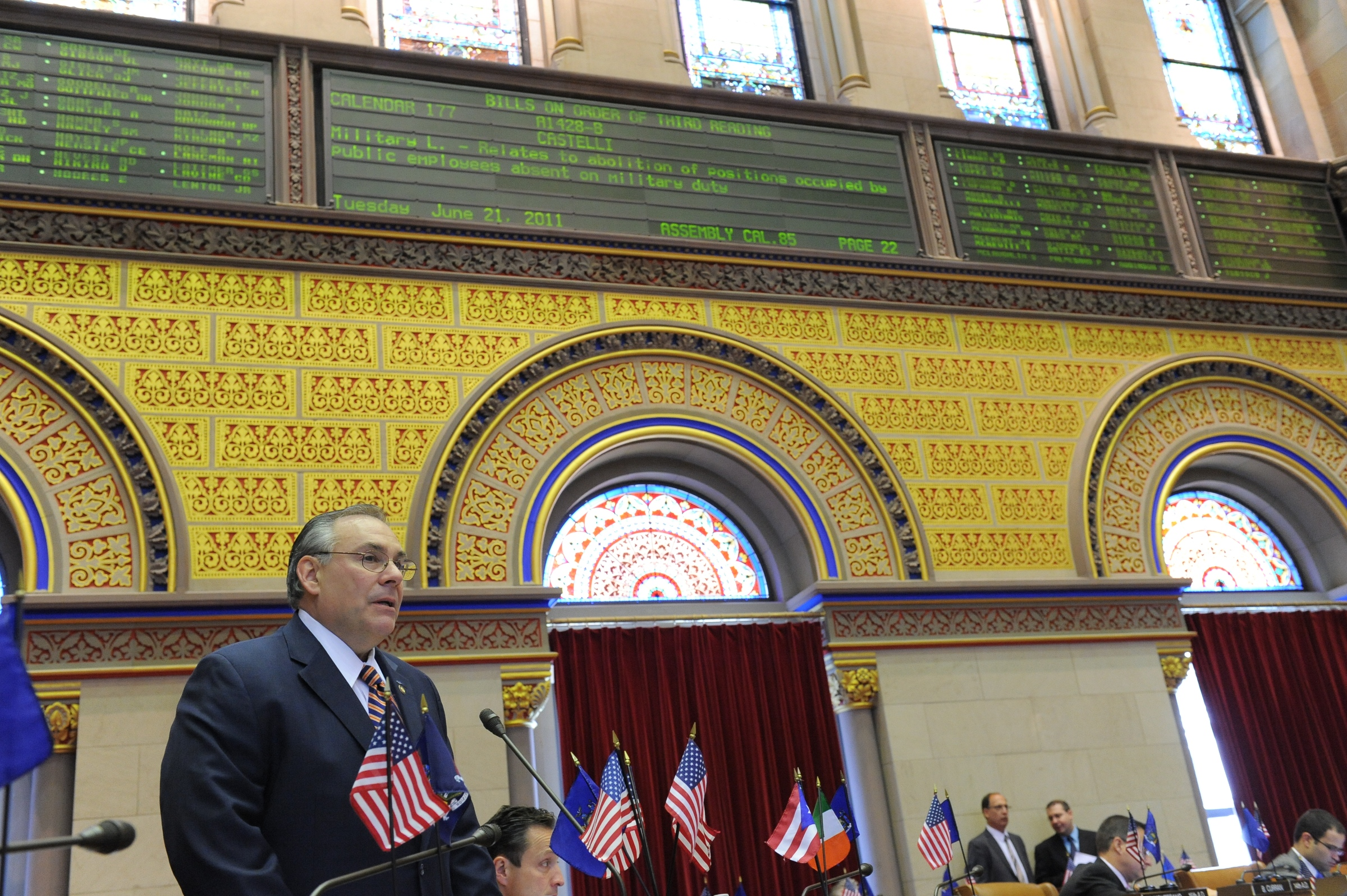
In 2011, Assemblyman Castelli became the first member of the Assembly Minority to have a statewide bill signed into law in 4 years. The law prohibited public employers from abolishing positions occupied by persons absent on military duty.

In his first 120 days in office, Castelli passed two pieces of legislation, the first of which was signed into law by Governor David A. Paterson as Chapter 294 of the Laws of 2010. Castelli showed an uncanny ability to pass his own prime-sponsored legislation despite being a member of the Assembly's minority, which has a reputation for legislative powerlessness amid the control of Assembly Speaker Sheldon Silver.

In 2011, Castelli became the first member of the Minority since 2007 to pass a "statewide" bill, a veterans protection measure which prohibited public employers from abolishing positions of persons absent on military duty. Six other Castelli bills have been signed into law, making him one of the more productive junior lawmakers in Albany. As of 2024, no other member of the Assembly Minority has passed a statewide bill since.

During the legislative session in 2012, Castelli authored and passed a bill to extend the statute of limitations for Vietnam Veterans to bring claims arising from exposure to Agent Orange and other phenoxy herbicides, which was signed into law by Governor Cuomo. He also cosponsored and passed a bill to increase funding for the state's Environmental Protection Fund (EPF), and conduct a health impact assessment of hydrofracking before the state considers whether or not to allow the controversial process to go forward.

Castelli also authored a bill to eliminate the Mount Kisco Urban Renewal Agency, a moribund public authority, which was called an "unnecessary mandate" for the village, that successfully passed both houses of the legislature in 2012. He also authored and passed legislation to rename portions of New York State Route 120 in Chappaqua and Purchase for Staff Sergeant Kyu Hyuk Chay, and Specialist Anthony Kalladeen, soldiers from those communities who were killed in action during the wars in Afghanistan, and Iraq, respectively.

== Election results ==
- February 2010 special election, NYS Assembly, 89th AD

Robert J. Castelli (REP - IND - CON)	...	6,966 (55.3%)
Peter B. Harckham (DEM - WOR)	...	5,639 (44.7%)

- November 2010 general election, NYS Assembly, 89th AD

Robert J. Castelli (REP - CON - TXP)	...	21,263 (50.1%)
Thomas M. Roach, Jr. (DEM - IND - WOR)	...	21,151 (49.9%)

- November 2012 general election, NYS Assembly, 93rd AD

Robert J. Castelli (REP - CON)	...	24,609 (47%)
David Buchwald (DEM - IND - WOR)	...	29,394 (53%)

== Bibliography ==
- Neubaer, David W. & Meinhold, Stephen S. Judicial Process: Law, Courts, and Politics in the United States. Fifth Ed. (Wadsworth Cengage Learning, New York 2009). ISBN 0-495-00994-6.
- Sifakis, Carl. The mafia encyclopedia. (Infobase Publishing, New York 2005). ISBN 0-8160-5695-1.
- Schmalleger, Frank. Criminology today: an integrative introduction. (Prentice Hall, New York 2002). ISBN 0-13-707485-9.
- White, Jonathan R. Terrorism and homeland security. Sixth Ed. (Wadsworth Cengage Learning, New York 2009). ISBN 0-534-62448-0.

New York State Assembly
Preceded by Adam Bradley	Member of the New York State Assembly from the 89th district 2010–2013	Succeeded by J. Gary Pretlow
