= Bobbi Bittker =

Bobbi Bittker is an American civil rights policy attorney, Democratic councilwoman, and LGBTQ and intersex rights advocate.

== Early life and education ==
Bittker graduated from Brandeis University and Quinnipiac University School of Law.

== Career ==
Bittker was elected to the Bedford, NY Town Board as a Democratic councilwoman in 2019. As a freshman council member, she proposed the town's first pride celebration. Bedford's observance of Pride Month became an annual event with Bittker as "a driving force behind it". She was re-elected in 2023.

Together with Assemblyman Chris Burdick, Bittker secured state grant funding to build a fully accessible playground as part of an initiative to make Bedford more "neurodivergent/autism-friendly".

Bittker chairs the American Bar Association's Sexual Orientation and Gender Identity Committee, which is part of its section on Civil Rights and Social Justice. In 2020, she drafted the ABA's resolution to oppose discriminatory policies against transgender and nonbinary people, which passed in its House of Delegates. Subsequently, she drafted two more resolutions which passed in the ABA's House of Delegates. The first promoted the inclusion of books with LGBTQ characters, and age-appropriate LGBTQ-inclusive sexual health education, in elementary and secondary schools. The second promoted obtaining the consent of minors with intersex traits in order to perform procedures.

== Selected articles ==
- Bittker, Bobbi M. "Racial and Ethnic Disparities in Employer-Sponsored Health Coverage." Human Rights. vol. 45, no. 4, 2020, pp. 18–21.
- Bittker, Bobbi M. "Civil Rights and Social Justice (CRSJ) in Local Government". American Bar Association. January 19, 2022.
- Bittker, Bobbi M. "NYC Pride: Proud, Loud and Record Crowds". Inside Press. June 27, 2016.
- Bittker, Bobbi M. "Pushing Against the Tide to Help At-Risk LGBTQ Youth THRIVE". American Bar Association. October 12, 2021.
- Bittker, Bobbi M. "Inclusive Curriculum as a Path to Better Public Health". Human Rights. vol. 47, no. 3/4, 2022, pp. 36–38.
- Bittker, Bobbi M. "Queer Jews Forced into a Different Closet: Antisemitism and Conditional Acceptance". American Bar Association. December 9, 2024.
- Bittker, Bobbi M. "The Ethical Implications of Clinical Trials in Low- and Middle-Income Countries". Human Rights. vol. 46, no. 4, 2021.

== Personal life ==
Bittker shared caregiving duties for her developmentally disabled uncle after his group home closed, and she was made his alternative guardian when she turned 18. One of her three children came out as transgender around 2013.
