= SCCA (disambiguation) =

SCCA most frequently refers to Sports Car Club of America.

SCCA may also refer to:

- Santa Clarita, California
- Santa Clara, California
- SCCA-Ljubljana, a Slovenian arts organization
- Seattle Cancer Care Alliance, American cancer treatment and research center
- Society of Certified Criminal Analysts
- Swedish Chess Computer Association, in English acronym
