= Westchester County Clerk =

- Incumbent; Thomas Roach since 2026
- Seat: White Plains, New York
- Formation: 1683
- Website: www.westchesterclerk.com

The Westchester County Clerk is the oldest elected office in Westchester County, New York, having been established in 1683. The County Clerk is charged with maintaining and preserving the official documents and records of the county thereof. The current Westchester County Clerk is Thomas Roach.

The Westchester County Clerk is the Registrar of county land transactions and liens as well as the Court clerk of the Supreme Court and County Court. The position is both a County Official and a New York State Constitutional Officer.

== List of County Clerks ==
No.	In Office	Name	Home Town
1	1684	John Ryder	Cortlandt
2	1684-1688	Joseph Lee	Yorktown
3	1688-1691	Edward Collier	Ossining
4	1691-1698	Joseph Lee	Yorktown
5	1698-1707	Benjamin Collier	Sing Sing
6	1707-1711	John Clapp	White Plains
7	1711-1722	Daniel Clark	Peekskill
8	1722-1746	William Forster	Westchester
9	1746-1760	Benjamin Nicoll	Scarsdale
10	1760-1777	John Bartow	Pelham
11	1777-1802	Richard Hatfield	White Plains
12	1802-1808	Thomas Ferris	Westchester
13	1808-1810	Elijah Crawford	White Plains
14	1810-1811	Thomas Ferris	Westchester
15	1811-1813	Elijah Crawford	White Plains
16	1813-1815	Thomas Ferris	Westchester
17	1815-1820	Elijah Crawford	White Plains
18	1820-1821	William Requa	Yonkers
19	1821-1828	Nehemiah S. Bates	Bedford
20	1828-1834	Nathaniel Bayles	Tarrytown
21	1834-1839	John H. Smith	Bedford
22	1839-1840	Chauncey Smith	Bedford
23	1840-1843	Charles Purdy	White Plains
24	1843-1849	Munson I. Lockwood	Pound Ridge
25	1849-1856	Robert R. Oakley	White Plains
26	1856-1859	John P. Jenkins	White Plains
27	1859-1867	Hiram P. Rowel	White Plains
28	1867	William W. Pierson	Sing Sing
29	1868-1877	J. Malcolm Smith	Sing Sing
30	1877-1883	John M. Rowel	White Plains
31	1883-1886	James F.D. Crane	Yonkers
32	1886-1896	John M. Digney	Yonkers
33	1896-1902	Leverett F. Crumb	Peekskill
34	1902-1908	Leslie Sutherland	Yonkers
35	1908-1914	Frank Buck	Mt. Vernon
36	1914-1920	Daniel Cashin	Yonkers
37	1920-1925	Louis Ellrodt	Mt. Vernon
38	1925-1932	Charles J.F. Decker	Croton Falls
39	1932-1938	Bernard Koch	Yonkers
40	1938-1943	Harold Mercer	White Plains
41	1943-1952	Robert J. Field	Peekskill
42	1952-1968	Edward L. Warren	Mt. Vernon
43	1968-1973	Edward N. Vetrano	Tarrytown
44	1974-1983	George R. Morrow Jr.	Mt. Pleasant
45	1983-1993	Andrew J. Spano	Yorktown
46	1994-2005	Leonard N. Spano	Yonkers
47	2006-2025	Timothy C. Idoni	New Rochelle
48	2026-	Thomas Roach	White Plains
