= Chris Burdick =

American politician and attorney

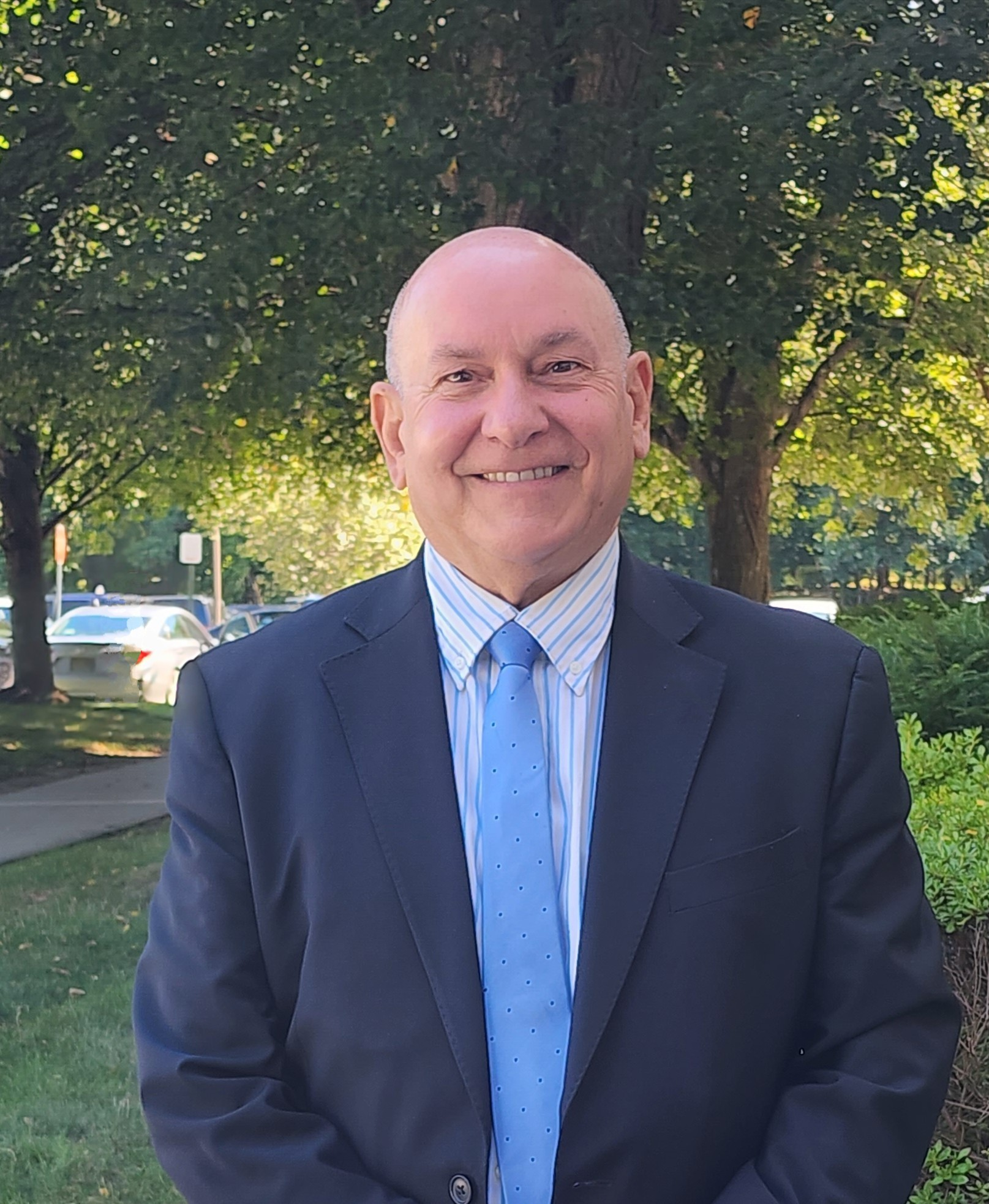

Member of the New York State Assembly from the 93rd district
- Incumbent
- Assumed office January 1, 2021
- Preceded by: David Buchwald

Supervisor of Bedford, New York
- In office January 1, 2014 – December 31, 2020
- Preceded by: Lee V. A. Roberts
- Succeeded by: MaryAnn Carr

Personal details
- Born: September 1, 1951 (age 75) Paterson, New Jersey, U.S.
- Party: Democratic
- Other political affiliations: Working Families Party; Independence Party of New York
- Relatives: Natalia Hussey-Burdick (niece)
- Education: University of California at Berkeley (BA); Johns Hopkins School of Advanced International Studies (MA); Seton Hall Law School (JD)
- Profession: Attorney, politician
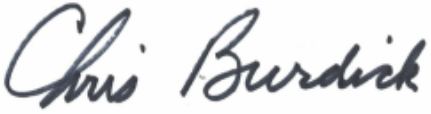
- Signature
- Website: Official website; Campaign website

Christopher W. Burdick is an American politician and attorney, currently serving as a member of the New York State Assembly, representing the 93rd district. In the 2020 New York State Assembly elections, Burdick was elected to succeed David Buchwald. The 93rd Assembly District includes the towns of Bedford, Harrison, Lewisboro, Mount Kisco, New Castle, North Castle, North Salem, Pound Ridge and White Plains. Before joining the New York State Assembly, Burdick served as Town Supervisor for the Town of Bedford.

== Education and early career ==
Burdick graduated from the University of California at Berkley, where he received a B.A. in economics and history. He later obtained a master's degree in international studies from the Johns Hopkins School of Advanced International Studies. Finally, Burdick earned a Juris Doctor from Seton Hall Law School, in Newark, New Jersey.

Before being elected as Bedford Town Supervisor, Burdick held a senior counsel position at Stewart Title Insurance Company of New York.

== Political career ==
Burdick's personal political career first started in 1977 when he ran as a Democratic candidate for New Jersey's 40th State Assembly District, at age 26. Burdick gained the most votes in the Democratic Primary but lost to Republican Party candidates William Cary Edwards and Walter M. D. Kern, Jr in the General election. Burdick had previously been a legislative aid to New Jersey State Assemblymember Andrew Maguire.

Burdick was first elected to public office in 2007, when he won a seat on the Bedford Town Board, running as a Democrat. Burdick was re-elected to his position on the town board in 2011. In 2013, Burdick was elected as the Bedford Town Supervisor.

In 2020, Democratic incumbent Assemblyman David Buchwald announced he would not seek re-election for the 93rd Assembly District, to pursue a bid for the New York's 17th congressional district. Burdick won the Democratic primary for the 93rd Assembly race, and went on to win in the General election, defeating Republican candidate John Nuculovic.

Burdick took office as a member of the New York State Assembly on January 1, 2021, leaving his position as Bedford Town Supervisor to Bedford Town Board Member and Deputy Supervisor MaryAnn Carr.

In 2022, Burdick faced a challenge from Gary Lipson, a local attorney based out of White Plains, but won reelection with more than 63 per cent of the vote. Burdick's campaign focused on protecting abortion rights in New York State and environmental policy.

Burdick is a member of the New York State Assembly committees on Correction, Environmental Conservation, Housing, People with Disabilities, Veterans' Affairs and Banks. Burdick is also Chair of the New York State Assembly Subcommittee on Employment Opportunities for People with Disabilities.

== Personal life ==
Along with his political offices, Burdick has served as Vice President of the East of Hudson Watershed Corporation, an environmental and development corporation, founded by local leaders in Northern Westchester, Putnam, and Dutchess Counties. Burdick also served as Vice Chairman of the Northern Westchester Watershed Committee, an organ within the Westchester County government.

Burdick has lived in Bedford since he moved from New Jersey in 1992. He lives with his wife, Illyria, and has three children and a granddaughter.

== Electoral history ==
1977 New Jersey State Assembly Election, District 40
Primary election
Party	Candidate	Votes	%
Democratic	Chris Burdick	6,766	50.15
Democratic	John M. Henderson	6,725	49.85
Total votes		13,491	100.00
General election
Republican	W. Cary Edwards	28,510	28.45
Republican	Walter M. D. Kern, Jr.	27,536	27.48
Democratic	Chris Burdick	21,794	21.75
Democratic	John M. Henderson	21,423	21.38
Libertarian	Susan Raggi	533	0.53
Libertarian	Daniel L. Bauch	413	0.41
Total votes		100,209	100.00
Republican hold			

2020 New York State Assembly Election, District 93
Primary election
Party	Candidate	Votes	%
Democratic	Chris Burdick	4,883	33.78
Democratic	Kristen Browde	4,533	31.36
Democratic	Jeremiah Frei-Pearson	2,751	19.03
Democratic	Alex Roithmayr	1,212	8.38
Democratic	Mark Jaffe	1,078	7.45
Total votes		14,457	100.00
General election
Democratic	Chris Burdick	40,438	61.07
Working Families	Chris Burdick	2,621	3.96
Independence	Chris Burdick	455	0.70
Total	Chris Burdick	43,514	65.72
Republican	John Nuculovic	20,783	31.39
Conservative	John Nuculovic	1,898	2.88
Total	John Nuculovic	22,681	34.26
Total votes		66,217	100.00
Democratic hold			

2022 New York State Assembly Election, District 93
Party	Candidate	Votes	%
Democratic	Chris Burdick	30,838	59.76
Working Families	Chris Burdick	1,689	3.27
Total	Chris Burdick	32,527	63.03
Republican	Gary Lipson	17,665	34.23
Conservative	Gary Lipson	1,410	2.73
Total	Gary Lipson	19,075	36.97
Total votes		51,602	100.00
Democratic hold			

2024 New York State Assembly Election, District 93
Party	Candidate	Votes	%
Democratic	Chris Burdick	45,219	91.99
Working Families	Chris Burdick	3,778	7.69
Total	Chris Burdick	48,997	99.67
Write-in		161	0.33
Total votes		49,158	100.00
Democratic hold			
