= List of mayors of White Plains, New York =

The City of White Plains in New York State was incorporated on January 1, 1916 with a law enacted by the state legislature in 1915 and signed by Governor Charles Whitman. The law provided for a two-year term for its mayor. The mayor's term was extended by local law to four years starting with the election of 1977.

When the mayor's office was established in 1915, the annual salary was $1,000. As of January 1, 2026, the salary was $176,700.

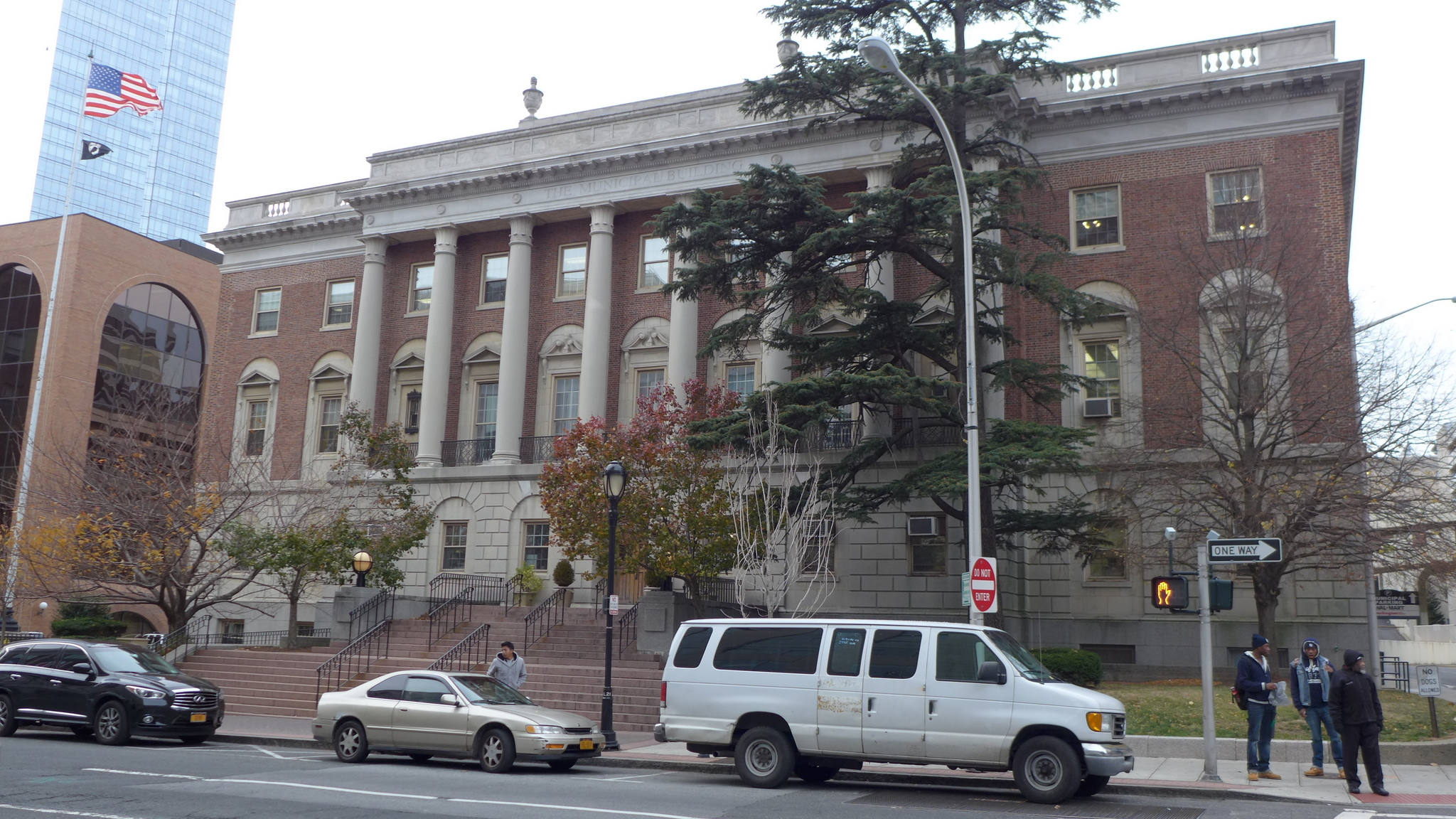
City hall building in White Plains, New York (photo 2013)

The following is a list of the mayors of White Plains since the city's establishment:

No.	Name	Dates in Office	Party	Notes
1	Farrington S. Thompson	January 1, 1916 – December 31, 1919	Democratic	elected to two-year terms in 1915 and 1917
2	Frederick E. Weeks	January 1, 1920 – December 31, 1925	Republican	elected to two-year terms in 1919, 1921, and 1923
3	Frederick C. McLaughlin	January 1, 1926 – December 31, 1931	Republican	elected to two-year terms in 1925, 1927, and 1929
4	Chauncey B. Griffen	January 1, 1932 – December 31, 1933	Republican	elected to a two-year term in 1931; did not seek re-election in 1933
5	Robert P. Smith	January 1, 1934 – December 31, 1935	Republican	elected to a two-year term in 1933; did not seek re-election in 1935
6	Walter Rogers	January 1, 1936 – December 31, 1937	Republican	elected to a two-year term in 1935; did not have his party's committee's support in the Republican primary election and lost to Chauncey T. S. Fish
7	Chauncey T. S. Fish	January 1, 1938 – December 31, 1945	Republican	elected to two-year terms in 1937, 1939, 1941, and 1943
8	Silas S. Clark	January 1, 1946 – December 31, 1949	Republican	elected to two-year terms in 1945 and 1947
9	Edwin G. Michaelian	January 1, 1950 – December 31, 1957	Republican	elected to two-year terms in 1949, 1951, 1953, and 1955
10	Richard S. Hendey	January 1, 1958 – December 31, 1973	Republican	elected to eight two-year terms; did not seek re-election in 1973
11	Carl J. Delfino	January 1, 1974 – July 21, 1974	Republican	elected to a two-year term in 1973; suffered an incapacitating stroke several days after taking office, submitted his resignation July 18, and died July 21 before the resignation became effective
—	Harry Gordon	January 1974 – May 3, 1974 (acting)	Republican	as president of the city's Common Council, he became acting mayor upon Delfino's incapacity; resigned
—	vacant	May 3, 1974 – May 22, 1974		the city's Common Council had only two Democrats and two Republicans, and could not agree on an interim mayor, even after two Democrats were elected to fill the remaining empty council seats
—	Michael J. Keating	May 22, 1974 – August 20, 1974 (acting)	Democratic	appointed via a State Supreme Court justice ruling that as the senior councilman, he should become acting mayor
12	Richard Maass	August 20, 1974 – December 31, 1974 (interim)	Democratic	the Common Council finally decided on an interim mayor
13	Michael J. Keating	January 1, 1975 – December 31, 1975	Democratic	won a special general election in 1974 to serve the remainder of Carl Delfino's term; lost in the 1975 general election to Alfred Del Vecchio
14	Alfred Del Vecchio	January 1, 1976 – December 31, 1993	Republican	had previously been a Democrat, but ran on the Republican and Conservative party lines; elected to a two-year term in 1975, and after passage of a law that changed the mayoral term to four years, was elected to four-year terms in 1977, 1981, 1983, and 1987; lost the Republican primary election in 1993
15	Seymour J. Schulman	January 1, 1994 – December 31, 1997	Democratic	elected to a four-year term in 1993; did not seek re-election in 1997
16	Joseph M. Delfino	January 1, 1998 – December 31, 2009	Republican	elected to four year terms in 1997, 2001, and 2005; did not seek re-election in 2009
17	Adam T. Bradley	January 1, 2010 – February 18, 2011	Democratic	elected to a four-year term in 2009; resigned after being convicted for domestic violence (his conviction overturned on appeal and he was acquitted upon retrial)
18	Thomas M. Roach	February 18, 2011 – April 1, 2011 (acting); April 1 – December 31, 2025	Democratic	as president of the city's Common Council, he became acting mayor upon Bradley's resignation; won a special election in March 2011 for the remainder of Bradley's term; elected to four-year terms in 2013, 2017, and 2021; did not seek re-election in 2025
19	Justin C. Brasch	January 1, 2026 – current	Democratic	elected to a four-year term in 2025

== See also ==
- History of White Plains, New York
