= Williams–DuBois House =

Historic house in New York, United States

- U.S. National Register of Historic Places
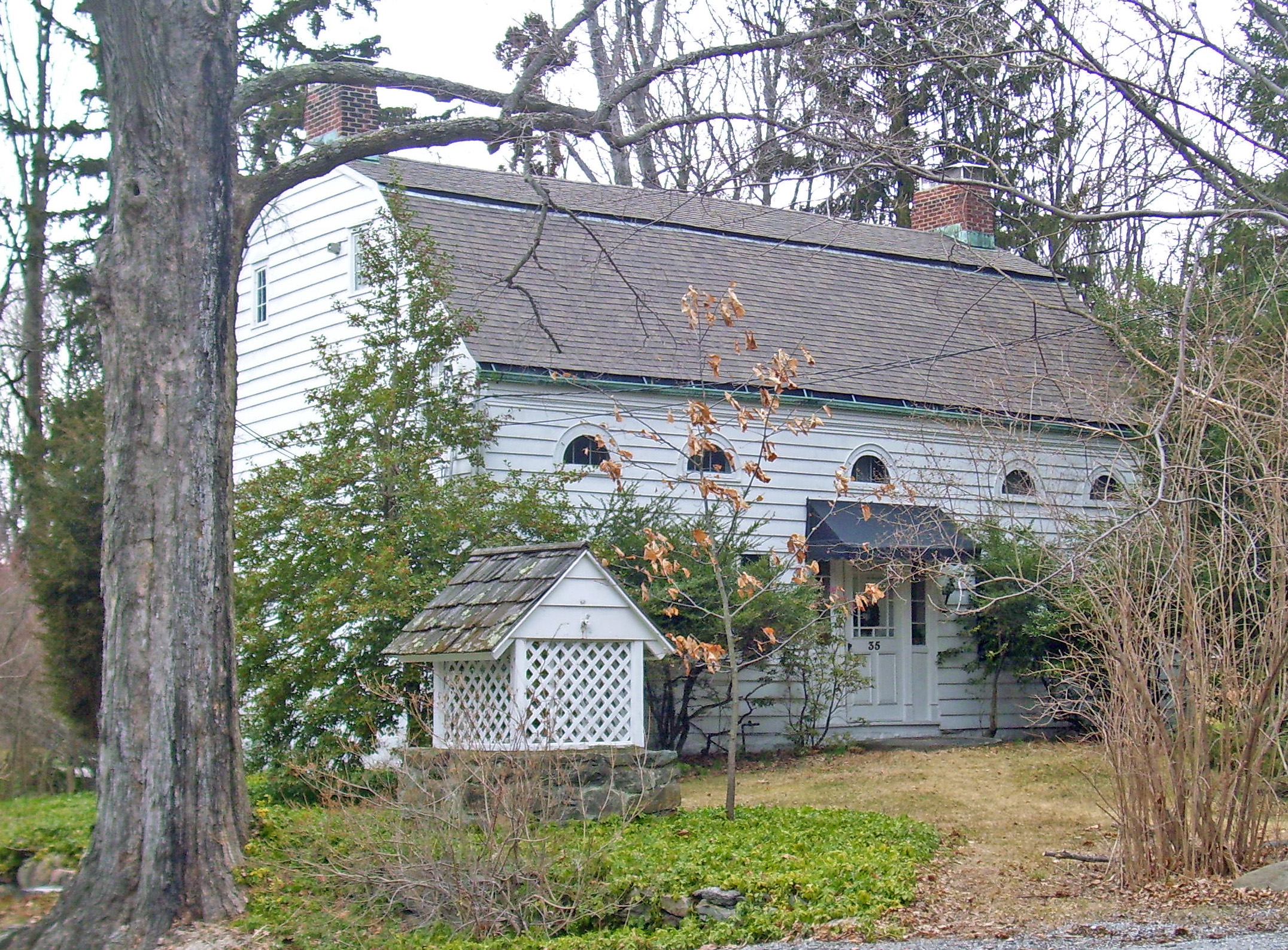
- East profile and south (front) elevation, 2009

- Location within New York Location within the United States
- Location: New Castle, NY
- Coordinates: 41°11′6″N 73°49′39″W
- Area: 3 acres (1.2 ha)
- Built: 1780
- Architect: Arthur Williams
- Architectural style: Colonial
- NRHP reference No.: 89000463
- Added to NRHP: May 25, 1989

The Williams–DuBois House is located at Grace Lane and Pinesbridge Road in New Castle, New York, United States. It was built by an early settler of the area during the Revolutionary War. In 1989 it was listed on the National Register of Historic Places.

Originally built in the Georgian-influenced American Colonial style, it later acquired some Federal style decoration, particularly on the interior. The lunette windows on the second story may have been added later, after their use on a now-demolished local hotel. Despite later modifications, it is the only house from that era remaining in the town that has a gambrel roof. It remains a private residence.

== Building ==
The house and its outbuildings and dependencies, none of which are considered contributing resources to the Register listing, are located on a three-acre (1.2 ha) lot on the northern corner of the three-way intersection, a quarter-mile (400 m) from the Ossining village line. The surrounding area has many other houses, all of more modern construction, on similarly large lots. It remains heavily wooded; a golf course is located a short distance to the north. Among the trees on the lot are some species rare in the area, native to the Far East.

The surrounding terrain is gently rolling. At the intersection Pinesbridge follows high ground between two swampy areas. The lot therefore slopes toward Oliver Pond to the northwest.

=== Exterior ===
A driveway from the intersection provides parking between the house and a former barn to the south, now used as a garage. The house itself is a one-and-a-half-story, five-by-three-bay wood frame structure on a fieldstone foundation. It is sided in clapboard on all but the north (rear) elevation and topped with a gambrel roof shingled in wood. Brick chimneys pierce it at either end.

On the ground level of the south (front) facade, the main entrance is centrally located. It is sheltered by a modern awning. The two side bays have plain window surrounds with projecting lintels. They are set with six-over-six double-hung sash windows and paneled wooden shutters with wrought iron hardware. A row of shrubs in front provides further shielding.

All five bays of the second floor are set with lunette windows with simple tracery. They have plain molded surrounds. Above them is a shallow molded cornice and copper rain gutter.

The north elevation, divided into three bays, is faced in wood shingles rather than clapboards. In the center of the ground floor, the rear entrance is a Dutch door with twelve lights in the upper section and paneling in the lower. On its east is a casement window, set with five eight-light panels. The western bay has a small square window and a ribbon of five single-light casement windows. The second floor has six-over-six double-hung sash over the entrance flanked by triple-paneled eight-light casement.

The east and west facades are differently fenestrated. The former has one nine-over-six double-hung sash on either side of the first floor, four regularly spaced six-over-six double-hung sash on the second, and two six-light casements in the gambrel apex at the attic level. The foundation is partly exposed on this side.

On the west the windows are more idiosyncratic. To the north on the first floor is a ribbon of four six-light casement, and on the south a 12-over-eight double-hung sash. There are only two six-over-six sashes on the second story, both close to the ends. At the attic the windows are the same as the opposite end. The foundation is exposed enough at the center to allow for a basement entrance and window.

=== Interior ===
A millstone now serves as the doorstep for the main entrance, an eight-paneled door in a paneled reveal. It has sidelights, glazed on top and paneled below, flanked by pilasters topped with block capitals. It opens into the central hallway through an entryway framed by post and lintel boxed beams.

Along with the center hall, the interior mostly retains its original four-on-four floor plan and many original finishes. That includes exposed heavy timber framing, wide floorboards and working fireplaces, with all but one having chimneys in the original diagonal configuration, as well as much vernacular Federal style woodwork. Most prominent among that is the fireplace in the front room on the east. Its mantelpiece has a surround featuring pilasters with square capitals and a frieze with floral motif. There is a large opening between it and the back room on that side, while the two rooms on the west remain entirely separate.

A simple staircase with square balusters, turned newel post and molded rail rises from the central hall to the second story. The balustrade continues along the stairwell in the second floor hallway. Like the first floor, many original finishes remain. A door in the hallway conceals a short stair to the attic, which also mostly remains as it was originally constructed. Modern metal suspension rods have been added to support the ceiling, and one of the original wooden tie beams has been replaced with a metal one.

In the basement, hand-hewn columns support the main beam and chimneys. Flat-arched structures at the bottom have openings used as storage bins. The floor is concrete.

== History ==
Throughout the 18th century, northern Westchester County was mostly divided into large farms, while the county's southern portion was more densely populated, with the larger villages. It is believed that one such farm was the hundred-acre (40 ha) farm that includes the house property. No record of its purchase exists, but later records show Arthur Williams, upon his appointment as a town assessor in 1803 and later as the district's highway master, as living at the property and suggesting he had done so for a long time. His family had been in the region since the 17th century; he very likely built the house.

Its design reflects the architectural influences that prevailed from the middle of the century through American independence. Migrants from New England had begun settling in the Hudson Valley, bringing with them a preferred vernacular building form of a rectangular one-and-a-half-story house of local material with gambrel roof. Inside the prevalent Georgian influences were more marked: a center-hall, four-over-four floor plan and balanced facade. Many houses like the Williams house, which may originally also have included a rear porch, were built through the 1820s.

In the early 1800s, Arthur's son William inherited the property. In his primary profession of sea captain he traveled extensively, bringing back specimens of Far Eastern trees which he planted around the property. On his breaks, he was the local public school inspector. After his death on one of his voyages, in 1826, the farm passed to his daughter Georgianna.

Around that time the house was first modified. The Federal style was in ascendance, and builders were often asked to copy the similar Adamesque mode popular in Britain for the preceding half-century. Many existing buildings were altered to add some elements of those newer styles. One such change, the lunette windows, was common, and thus the windows on the second story of the house's south facade were duly altered. The change may have been inspired by the Union Hotel (no longer extant) in downtown Ossining, which had a similar row of lunettes.

Georgianna Williams married Lawrence DuBois, descended from a family of Belgian Huguenots who extensively settled the central region of the valley. Her husband primarily farmed the land; he also served in the same position as highway master that his wife's grandfather had held. They had two children.

Their son, William, inherited the property. In 1864 he married Sarah Washburn, a member of a prominent Ossining-area family. During their ownership, the rear porch was installed, possibly replacing an original. A front porch was definitely installed. Both had a shed roof supported by brackets.

William and Sarah had eight children, but after her death in 1926, none of them would inherit the farm. Instead, her husband sold the property to a local developer. By that time the growth of the railroad, and the early development of the county's parkway network had brought suburbanization to northern Westchester. Large farms like the one that had been in the family for a century and a half were slowly disappearing, and after the sale the Williams–DuBois farm joined them, subdivided into the smaller, purely residential lots that exist today.

The house has been through several different owners since that subdivision, some of whom have made some changes. In 1940 the porches were removed, replaced with a patio in the rear and the millstone in front, and a large entryway cut inside between the east rooms on the first floor. Later owners have respected the house as part of the county's history; however sometime between the Register listing and 2009 the portions of the chimneys originally exposed on the exterior's first story have been covered in clapboard.

== See also ==
- National Register of Historic Places listings in northern Westchester County, New York
