= David Buchwald =

American politician and attorney (born 1978)

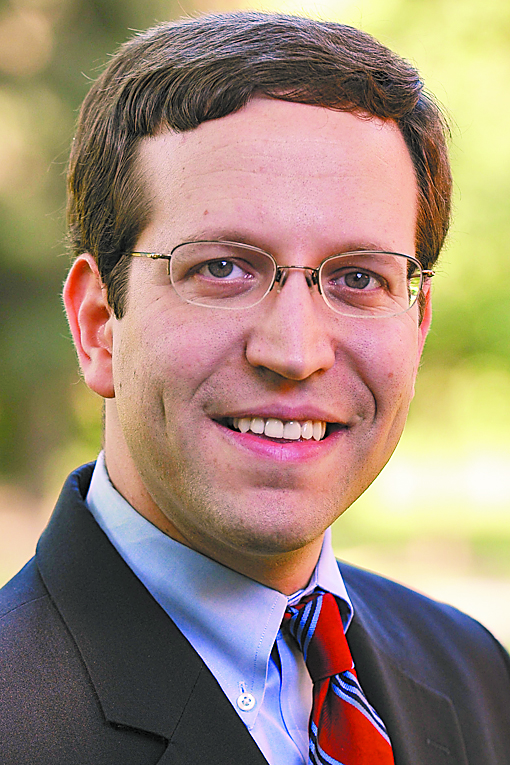
- Buchwald in 2015

Member of the New York State Assembly from the 93rd district
- In office January 1, 2013 – December 31, 2020
- Preceded by: Robert Castelli (redistricting)
- Succeeded by: Chris Burdick

Personal details
- Born: David Evan Buchwald; June 12, 1978 (age 48)
- Party: Democratic
- Parent: Naomi Reice Buchwald
- Education: Yale University (BS); Harvard University (MPP, JD)
- Profession: Lawyer, politician
- Website: Official website

David Evan Buchwald (born June 12, 1978) is an American politician and attorney who served as a member of the New York State Assembly, representing the 93rd district.

== Early life and education ==
Buchwald was born on June 12, 1978, and grew up in Larchmont and Mamaroneck, New York. His mother was judge Naomi Reice Buchwald and his father was Don Buchwald. Through his father, he is a direct descendant of Baal Shem Tov, the founder of Hasidic Judaism.

He attended Yale University, where he received a B.S. in physics. He later went on to receive a Master of Public Policy from the John F. Kennedy School of Government and a J.D. from Harvard Law School.

== Career ==
Before running for New York State Assembly, Buchwald worked at the law firm Davis Polk. He also interned for Congresswoman Nita Lowey.

Buchwald was first elected on November 6, 2012, when he defeated the incumbent office holder. He ran for Congress in 2020 to replace retiring incumbent Nita Lowey, and lost to attorney Mondaire Jones.

== Personal life ==
Buchwald married Lara M. Samet on March 1, 2014. Their wedding was officiated by Rabbi Alan Silverstein.

== Electoral history ==
New York 93rd Assembly District, 2012 General Election
Party	Candidate	Votes	%
Democratic	David Buchwald	27,408	50.8
Working Families	David Buchwald	1,160	2.1
Independence	David Buchwald	826	1.5
Total	David Buchwald	29,394	54.4
Republican	Bob Castelli	22,386	41.5
Conservative	Bob Castelli	2,223	4.1
Total	Bob Castelli (incumbent)	24,609	45.6
Total votes		54,003	100.0
Democratic gain from Republican			

New York 93rd Assembly District, 2014 General Election
Party	Candidate	Votes	%
Democratic	David Buchwald	18,956	82.7
Independence	David Buchwald	2,050	8.9
Working Families	David Buchwald	1,907	8.3
Total	David Buchwald (incumbent)	22,913	100.0
Total votes		22,913	100.0
Democratic hold			

New York 93rd Assembly District, 2016 General Election
Party	Candidate	Votes	%
Democratic	David Buchwald	37,640	90.4
Working Families	David Buchwald	1,792	4.3
Independence	David Buchwald	1,617	3.9
Women's Equality	David Buchwald	590	1.4
Total	David Buchwald (incumbent)	41,639	100.0
Total votes		41,639	100.0
Democratic hold			

New York 93rd Assembly District, 2018 General Election
Party	Candidate	Votes	%
Democratic	David Buchwald	33,543	65.4
Working Families	David Buchwald	781	1.5
Independence	David Buchwald	754	1.5
Women's Equality	David Buchwald	347	0.7
Reform	David Buchwald	109	0.2
Total	David Buchwald (incumbent)	35,543	69.3
Republican	John Nuculovic	13,964	27.2
Conservative	John Nuculovic	1,796	3.5
Total	John Nuculovic	15,760	30.7
Total votes		51,294	100.0
Democratic hold			

New York's 17th Congressional District, 2020 Democratic Primary
Party	Candidate	Votes	%
Democratic	Mondaire Jones	32,794	41.91%
Democratic	Adam Schleifer	12,732	16.27%
Democratic	Evelyn Farkas	12,210	15.60%
Democratic	David Carlucci	8,648	11.05%
Democratic	David Buchwald	6,673	8.53%
Democratic	Asha Castleberry-Hernandez	2,062	2.64%
Democratic	Allison Fine	1,588	2.03%
Democratic	Catherine Parker	1,539	1.97%
Total votes		78,246	100.0%

New York State Assembly
Preceded by Robert Castelli, 89th District at the time	New York State Assembly, 93rd District; 2013–present	Incumbent
