= Isaac Young House =

Historic house in New York, United States

- U.S. National Register of Historic Places
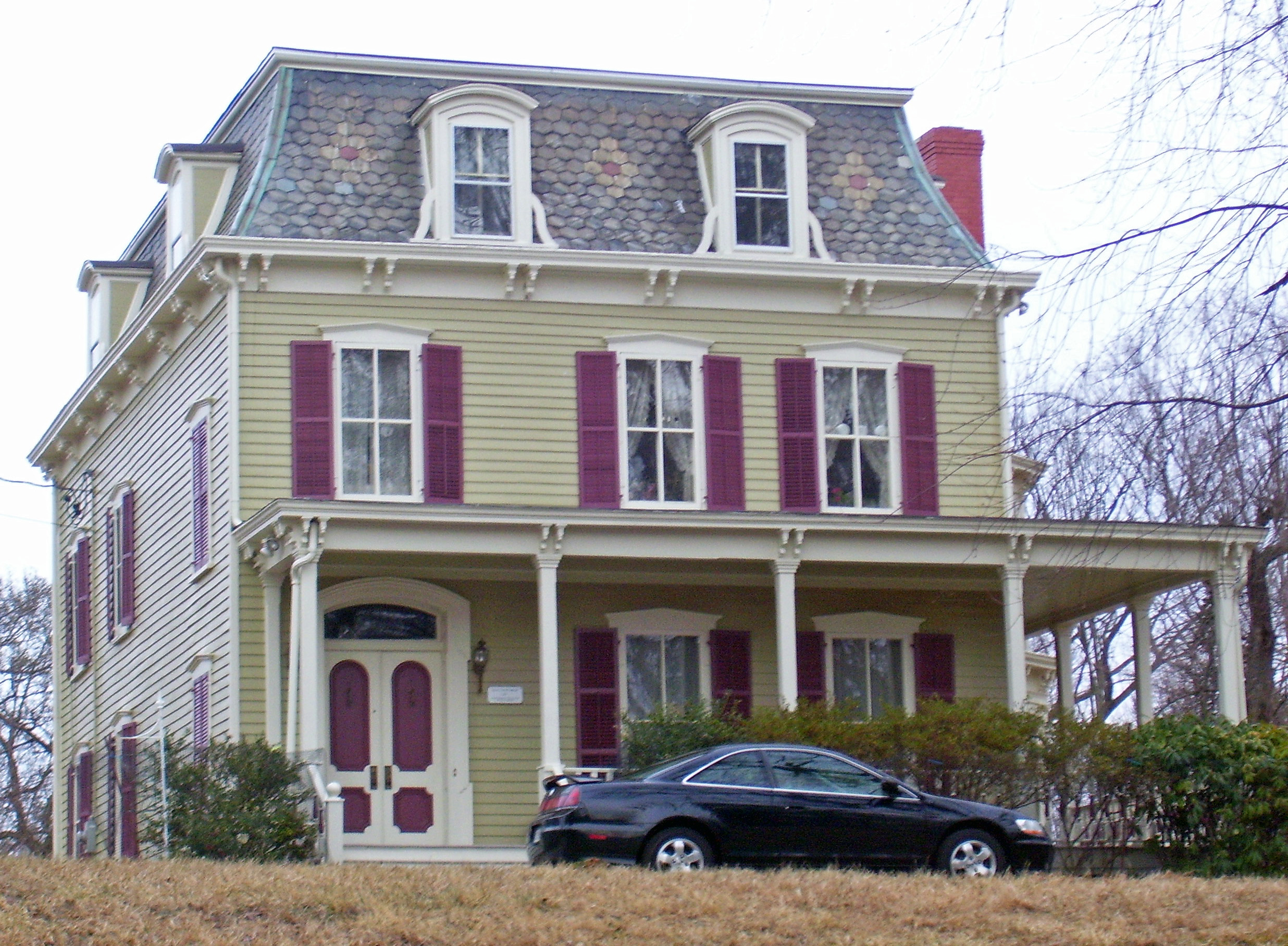
- East profile and north (front) elevation, 2009

- Location within New York Location within the United States
- Location: New Castle, NY
- Nearest city: White Plains
- Coordinates: 41°11′36″N 73°48′59″W
- Area: 5.8 acres (2.3 ha)
- Built: ca. 1872.
- Architectural style: Second Empire
- NRHP reference No.: 04000876
- Added to NRHP: August 20, 2004

The Isaac Young House is an historic wood frame house on Pinesbridge Road in New Castle, New York, United States. It was built about 1872 in the Second Empire style. Its owner, Isaac Young, was a descendant of early settlers in the area. He chose the Second Empire style, more commonly found in cities and villages than on farms, possibly as a way of demonstrating his affluence. The present structure appears to incorporate parts of a vernacular late 18th-century farmhouse, leaving several anomalies in the current house as a result. The house's position atop a low hill would have, in its time, given it a commanding view of the region, including the Hudson River and New York City's skyline.

The Isaac Young House is the only Second Empire house from that era in New Castle. There have been several renovations and alterations, including the removal of its original Italianate central tower. The current owners restored it extensively after purchasing it from the Youngs. In 2004 the house and its barn were listed on the National Register of Historic Places.

== History ==
=== Early history ===
The earliest recorded owners of the property on which the house now stands are a Henry and Mary Slason, who sold 140 acres (57 ha) including its current lot to a Gilbert Strang in 1795. Over the course of the early 19th century it was subdivided further and eventually became property of the Chadeayne family, owners of other large parcels in the area.

Isaac Young was a native of Putnam County to the north, who had come to New Castle from his father's farm in Southeast ten years after the older man's death in 1846. He worked on the farm of the Chadeaynes' neighbors the Vails, where the father had died around the same time, leaving his widow and three of their children to tend things. In that job he became acquainted with Mary, and the two wed in 1858. At some point after the 1860 census, the couple moved out and began looking for land they could farm on their own. In 1868, the present property comprising two parcels of land, a combined 36 acres (15 ha), were sold to Elizabeth Young, Isaac's wife.

=== Young family ===
For the rest of the 19th century, the Youngs lived at the house and farmed. Mary died in 1902, with her son inheriting the property and her husband retaining the lifetime right of tenancy, which he exercised until his own death in 1914. Although the 1900 census describes both Isaac and John, who had married one of the Chadeayne daughters two years earlier, as "retired", later records suggest that the property was again being actively farmed. An aerial photo from the early 20th century shows the house surrounded by regularly planted trees, suggesting an apple orchard or something similar.

Throughout the 1920s the Youngs sold many of their landholdings. At that time the growing use of automobiles was accelerating the suburbanization of Westchester County that the railroads had begun several decades earlier, bringing it to the previously rural and agricultural northern section where New Castle is. Farms like the one the Youngs and Chadeaynes had run were increasingly being subdivided into the large residential lots which characterize the area today. At the time of John Young's death in 1939, the property was inventoried at 17 acres (6.9 ha) and the house characterized as "of a type that is obsolete in the real estate market in Westchester County today."

In the years after World War II, John's widow Lottie and her son, James, sold several more parcels off, finally reaching the current 5.8-acre (2.3 ha) lot in 1952. In 1955, unable or unwilling to subdivide the property further, they took out a mortgage on it. James' employment epitomized the change in the upper Westchester economy over the 80 years since the house was built—the grandson of farmers, he was commuting from their land to a regular job as a commercial artist at the Manhattan offices of the Metropolitan Life Insurance Company.

Lottie Young died the same year she and her son took out the mortgage. He inherited the property. It had fallen into disrepair, and in 1961 he sold it to the Clarks.

=== Recent history ===
Small changes had been made to the house over the years. Plumbing was installed, the breakfast room created by walling off part of the front verandah, and the half-bath created in the kitchen wing by eliminating a stair. It is likely that the cupola had been removed as well. The reforestation that followed the decline of agriculture in the region was encroaching on the view; while it was possible to see the Hudson River in 1961 from the roof, this is no longer so. (When the leaves are down the skyscrapers of the city are still visible, and the mountains of the Hudson Highlands can easily be seen to the north.)

The current owners have made some changes of their own in the last 40 years. They opened a second-floor closet to provide access to the sleeping loft, then converted it into a playroom. On the third floor they created one of the bedroom closets.

Most of their efforts have been aimed at restoring the original decorative splendor of the house. On the inside, the molding on the plaster ceilings has been added and the dining room molding restored. Outside, they replaced the front verandah balusters and rear verandah columns with parts meant to be as close to the original as possible. In the early 21st century the main stair's balusters and newel posts were replaced.

== Buildings and grounds ==
The house is located on a 5.8-acre (2.3 ha) lot on the east side of Pinesbridge between Apple Farm and Hoags Cross roads, three-quarters of a mile (1.2 km) west of its partial interchange with the Taconic State Parkway. The neighboring properties on the same side of the street are houses of various eras on similarly large lots, many now heavily wooded and planted with mature trees. It sits atop one of the area's low hills, 640 feet (200 m) in elevation. The house stands in a generally cleared lot, and is approached by a roughly circular driveway which leads up from the road. In a wooded portion at the rear of the lot are remnants of old stone walls and foundations.

=== House ===
The architect and builder of the house are unknown; it is probable that they were local and, if anything, used pattern books of the era. While the Second Empire style of the house was a common one in the 1870s, it was mostly used in urban settings. The Youngs supplemented the proceeds of their farming through real estate transactions, including some in nearby Ossining, so they would have been familiar with it. In choosing the Second Empire style as their preferred mode for a country house, they may have been very overtly showing off their prosperity.

The house, as originally built, has a number of features further suggesting this, such as the carefully and elaborately finished interior, particularly the first floor. Its cupola, which the roof stairs were originally meant to serve, would have allowed sweeping views over the property, much less forested at the time, to the Hudson River and Palisades beyond. It is unclear why so many bedrooms were built, as it does not appear from census records or any other source that people other than the Youngs or their only child, John, ever lived there for any length of time.

It is probable that the house was built by expanding and modifying an earlier one on the same site, probably an 18th-century vernacular farmhouse of the type still common in the area at the time. Many of the "oddities" of the current structure suggest this:

- The secondary staircase on the first floor is how the main staircase of an earlier house would have been built and located.
- The hand-hewn beams in the basement, some with the bark still present, appear to date to the earlier period. The foundation itself is only located under two of the first floor's four rooms, suggesting an earlier structure with a smaller footprint.
- The kitchen wing's different window treatment and gable suggest it was originally attached to a house similar to itself.
- The many windows and doors that seem to have just enough space for themselves suggest builders working carefully to fit the new house to the original.

An entry in the Biographical History of Westchester County, written around 30 years later, supports this. It refers to Young as "constantly having made improvements and added to the beauty and value of his country home."

==== Exterior ====
The house is a three-story, four-bay wood frame structure on a stone and brick foundation, sided in clapboard. The house is topped with a mansard roof clad in hexagonal slate scales. There are two wraparound verandahs. On the south side a brick chimney rises the full height of the building. The structure of the house and arrangement of the various architectural features such as doors and windows is asymmetrical.

On the western (front) facade, there are a door and two windows on the lower floor, with three windows above. The main entrance is to the left side, set apart from the windows by a blind bay, a treatment echoed in the second-story fenestration. The door has a segmental arch with transom. On both stories the windows are set in pedimented surrounds flanked by louvered wooden shutters. They are set with two-over-two double-hung sash windows. There is a verandah across the west front with a return on the south side of the house, both having a flat roof supported by eight square columns with chamfered corners, square capitals and rectangular bases. North of the main entrance, on the facade, is a similar pilaster. Above each column, and below the eaves, are paired wooden brackets. Along the floor is a railing supported by turned balusters.

At the roofline, paired brackets similar to those of the verandah support a molded cornice above a plain frieze. On each side the mansard roof is pierced by two dormer windows, both topped with gentle arches and supported by side brackets. Alternating with the windows is a medallion design formed with the slate tiles, of one red one surrounded by yellow ones. There is metal flashing at the corners.

On the east (rear) elevation, there is a one-and-a-half-story gabled kitchen wing, its roof pierced by a single brick chimney in the center. The main block here is narrower than the front, and slightly off-center. Its entrance is further to the north than the main entrance, and the clapboard is wider than that on the rest of the house. There is also a wraparound veranda on the kitchen wing, with square columns that become cylindrical and arches connecting them at the roof.

Its ground story has casement windows on the north, within the veranda enclosure. There are two sash windows on the south, one of which is so close to the kitchen wing it is the only unshuttered window on the house. The second floor has three different windows—a northern window with shutters similar to the windows on the front but no pediment, the middle one a small square window with a sill too long on one side, and on the south one with a larger lower pane than upper, dropping below the gable's roofline.

The south elevation has two double-decker bay windows, one smaller than the other. Both are five-sided, set with six one-over-one double-hung sash augmented by a rectangular panel beneath them. At the corners are pilasters with square capitals, like the front verandah's columns. The eaves have the same double brackets as the main and verandah rooflines.

On its face are windows with the same treatment as the main facade's—two on the first floor and one on the second. A portion of the rear verandah subsequently enclosed to create a breakfast room has casement windows, and there is a small kitchen window next to it. The upper portion of the gabled kitchen wing has two six-pane windows.

The north face is the plainest. Both stories have the same pattern of three windows, pedimented and shuttered, as the west and south. The easternmost window on both is irregularly spaced, displaced to near the eastern corner. A pair of double doors in the foundation near the east lead to the cellar.

=== Interior ===
A large flagstone serves as a walk to the three front steps flanked by newel posts and railings. The main entrance doors are recessed slightly in their molded surround. They have an arched top panel with the lower corners cut out and a square lower panel with all the corners cut.

==== First floor ====
In the front hall, a lamp hangs from a round decoration on the plaster ceiling with curved decorations and radiating lines. The main stairs, flush with the north wall, have octagonal newel posts with beaded panels and a flattened finial. They are succeeded by turned balusters.

Paneled double doors at the east end lead into the parlor, the largest room in the house. Molded baseboard runs around the entire room. The windows are complemented by panels in the wall below and a two-inch (5 cm) wooden drapery rod with acorn finials above. In the ceiling plaster is a molded cornice and two friezes, with a sunflower surrounded by other floral motifs at the center.

The decorative centerpiece of the parlor is the black stone mantelpiece. It has an arched opening with beveled edges on the rectangular top. Its projecting keystone is decorated with thin incised baroque curves. The stub of a chimney still rises from it.

Double doors lead into the living room to the east. It has baseboard molding and a similarly decorated plaster ceiling, although its design is more oval. A plaster archway leads into the bay window, with a baroque keystone similar to the parlor mantelpiece and pilasters with a floral motif and Ionic-style brackets on top. French doors with 14-pane windows open into the breakfast room. The living room mantelpiece is wooden with a projecting curved medallion on top and similarly incised baroque decoration.

Another set of double doors leads to the dining room, in the northeast corner of the house. It, too, has baseboard molding and a plaster ceiling cornice. A passageway to the kitchen is framed by a pointed arch made of tongue and groove paneling, flanked by pilasters similar to the verandah columns. Molded doors lead to the china closet, a larger closet under the stairs, and the cellar. The dining room mantelpiece is simpler, made of wood with a rectangular top, Tudor arched opening and square pilasters, again taking after the verandah columns. A chimney breast in the room is not connected to the mantel.

The kitchen is in the rear wing. Its walls and ceilings are tongue-in-groove paneling, with the exception of the brick eastern wall. A paneled door on the east opens onto the veranda; another door on the north has been nailed shut. There is a half-bath and closet on the west side, both with paneled doors.

Between the three main rooms of the first floor in the main block is a back hallway with the same baseboard molding. All of its doors just barely fit, and have no molding. A small staircase leads from it to the second floor. It has a newel post with a flattened top and handrail with turned balustrade.

==== Second floor ====
The second floor is all bedrooms, except for that portion in the kitchen wing. Originally it was a sleeping loft as well, but has since been converted into a children's playroom. The back hall is the primary means of access to all rooms save a guest bedroom.

At the top of the back stairs are an identical newel post and balustrade around the stairwell. Most doors have paneled doors and a molded surround. The exception is the two doors on the north side, of tongue-and-groove paneling without surrounds.

Through a former closet, an oval door similar to a submarine's bulkhead door leads to the playroom. It is necessary to step down, and the ceiling is only 5 feet 10 inches (180 cm) The exterior clapboarding is visible on the west wall.

The master bedroom, with the upper bay window, is on the south side. It has the same rectangular panels as the lower window. Its arched entrance is similar but with an acanthus leaf on the front of the bracket. Baseboard molding is around the room, complemented by a cornice in the ceiling plaster.

In the northeast corner is another bedroom. Its windows begin almost at floor level. There is also baseboard molding and a ceiling cornice, but its main decorative element is the mantelpiece. It is a simple Greek Revival design, with simple pilasters on each side supporting a rectangular entablature. A closed doorway that would have led to the other bedroom is wider than all the other doorways in the house.

That other bedroom is the simplest in the house. It has only the baseboard molding, and simple molding over the closed door. The guest bedroom, in the southwest corner, has rectangular panels below the windows and an acorn doorstop on one of the doors from the master bedroom. It has the baseboard but no ceiling decoration.

The bathroom has the baseboard molding. The lower section of its two-over-two sash is larger than the upper. The wall separating it and a hallway closet curves, and there is a chair rail around the room.

==== Third floor ====
Upstairs, the decoration is simpler. The walls slant due to the mansard roof. There are three bedrooms, one closet, and a stair leading to the roof.

The southeast bedroom has a closet with only the lower half of the door. The exterior of the hallway door is paneled, but the interior surface is tongue-and-groove. There is a similar door on the northeast bedroom, which has a curved wall and exposed chimney. The parlor chimney comes up through the southwest bedroom.

A closet with a similarly dual-surfaced door is located near the top of the stairs. The hallway's baseboard is more ornate than that in the rooms. Between the northeast and southeast bedrooms a door opens to the stairs to the roof.

==== Cellar ====
The cellar takes up the space under the living and dining rooms. The floor is cement. The ceiling retains some wooden beams that are crudely hewn trees, one of which still has the bark on it, support the ceiling, while others have been replaced with steel girders. On the walls the stone and brick of the foundation is exposed. A cistern on the north has been filled in. A stone column appears to have been a support for a fireplace that no longer exists. The original flue for a coal furnace remains on the west side. The inside of the cellar door has strap hinges.

== See also ==
- National Register of Historic Places listings in northern Westchester County, New York
