= Adam Bradley (politician) =

American politician

Member of the New York State Assembly from the 89th district
- In office January 2003 – December 2009
- Preceded by: Naomi Matusow
- Succeeded by: Robert Castelli

Mayor of White Plains
- In office January 1, 2010 – February 18, 2011
- Preceded by: Joseph M. Delfino
- Succeeded by: Thomas M. Roach, Jr.

Personal details
- Born: July 13, 1961 (age 65) Westchester County, New York, U.S.
- Party: Democratic
- Children: 2 daughters
- Education: Pace University; Pace Law School
- Profession: lawyer, politician
- Website: AdamBradley.org

Adam T. Bradley (born July 13, 1961) is a Democratic former New York State Assemblyman and former Mayor of the City of White Plains.

== Early life and career ==
Bradley was born and raised in Westchester County, New York. He attended Pace University, where he received a B.A. in 1985 and a law degree in 1989. He worked as an attorney in private practice specializing in family law. Bradley also served as an assistant county attorney in Westchester County and as counsel to Assemblyman Richard L. Brodsky.

== New York State Assembly ==
Bradley was a member of the New York State Assembly, representing the 89th Assembly District, which encompassed the towns of Bedford, Harrison, Lewisboro, Mount Kisco, New Castle, North Castle, Pound Ridge.

He was first elected to the Assembly in November 2002 after a successful primary election against the then Democratic incumbent Naomi C. Matusow. The central issue in that election revolved around a special sales tax premium afforded to the City of White Plains. The controversial nuclear reactor at Indian Point also featured prominently in the election.

Bradley was a leading advocate for children's safety, environmental conservation and protection, and health care when he was in the New York State legislature.

== Mayor of White Plains ==
Bradley was elected Mayor of the City of White Plains in 2009 and served in that role until his resignation on February 18, 2011.

He was a member of the Mayors Against Illegal Guns Coalition, a bi-partisan coalition co-chaired by Boston Mayor Thomas Menino and New York City Mayor Michael Bloomberg.

=== Arrest, conviction, resignation, retrial and dropping of charges ===
On February 28, 2010, Bradley was charged in White Plains City Court with assault in the 3rd degree, a class A misdemeanor, after his wife filed a domestic violence complaint against him. Bradley's wife, Fumiko Bradley, alleged that he grabbed her left arm, placed it on a door frame, and slammed the door on her hand. Bradley acknowledged that he and his wife had problems, but denied that he assaulted her. On March 5, 2010, Neal Comer, Fumiko Bradley's lawyer, said that she wanted the assault charge against her husband dropped. Comer said if Fumiko Bradley was "forced to testify, she won't support this charge, and the D.A. should be aware of that." The couple filed for divorce on September 14, 2010.

On April 8, 2010, Westchester County prosecutors filed additional charges against Bradley related to his arrest for allegedly assaulting his wife. Bradley was charged with witness tampering, harassment, and contempt of court. Bradley pleaded not guilty to the new charges and was eventually found not guilty on all criminal charges filed against him.

Shortly after the criminal charges, a movement began to remove him from office. The White Plains Common Council passed a No Confidence Vote expressing that the Common Council was not confident Adam Bradley was capable of being mayor of White Plains.

In August 2010 Mayor Bradley ran into additional legal problems when the White Plains Common Council and the city's ethics board opened an ethics investigation against him. After Bradley was forced to leave his residence due to an order of protection against him, he rented an apartment in a building owned by a real estate developer who had properties in the City of White Plains. His rent there was not disclosed. According to news reports, within days of moving into that apartment, Bradley arranged a meeting between the developer-landlord and highly placed city officials. The developer is the son-in-law of a former mobster, Anthony Anastasio. The City retained independent counsel to carry out the investigation. As of the date of his resignation this investigation ceased as it was moot due to his not being Mayor any longer.

On December 9, 2010, he was found guilty of the attempted assault and harassment of his wife along with criminal contempt, following a bench trial.

On March 17, 2011, he was sentenced to probation for a period of three years. On October 17, 2012, New York Supreme Court, Appellate Division, 2nd Department in Brooklyn overturned the criminal conviction finding that he had incorrectly not been allowed to call witnesses.

On Friday, June 21, 2013, a six-person jury found Adam Bradley not guilty of all the remaining criminal charges filed, three counts of harassment, one of attempted assault and one of criminal contempt after a two week retrial at the Westchester County courthouse in White Plains, New York.

New York State Assembly
Preceded by Naomi C. Matusow	New York State Assembly, 89th District; 2003–2009	Succeeded by Robert Castelli
Political offices
Preceded by Joseph M. Delfino	Mayor of White Plains; 2010–2011	Succeeded by Thomas Roach
