= George Latimer =

George Latimer may refer to:

- George Latimer (escaped slave) (1819–c. 1896), escaped slave whose case became a major political issue in Massachusetts
- George Latimer (Minnesota politician) (1935–2024), mayor of St. Paul, Minnesota
- George Latimer (New York politician) (born 1953), U.S. representative from New York
- George Latimer (Pennsylvania politician) (1750–1825), Speaker of the Pennsylvania House of Representatives
- George W. Latimer (1900–1990), justice of the Utah Supreme Court
