= Society of Certified Criminal Analysts =

Professional organization

The Society of Certified Criminal Analysts (SCCA) is a professional body established to promote professionalism and high standards in analysis by establishing standards and testing and by certifying analysts. The Society was established by working analysts in 1989 to complement the work of the International Association of Law Enforcement Intelligence Analysts (IALEIA), which is open to analysts and intelligence officers worldwide.

As of 2005, over 200 persons worldwide have met certification standards. Members tend to be among the more experienced and educated analysts and frequently hold higher classifications in their respective organizations. Some agencies encourage SCCA certification for analysts seeking promotion or employment.

SCCA is the accreditation arm of IALEIA in 1996 and IALEIA's support was re-affirmed by its Board in 2003. SCCA also entered into an agreement with the Australian Institute of Professional Intelligence Officers (AIPIO) to allow its members to qualify for certification without necessarily being members of IALEIA.

Countries in which analysts have been certified include Canada, Argentina, Australia, Austria, Belgium, France, the Netherlands, South Africa, the United Kingdom and the United States.

Certification is by way of examination which takes about 6 hours in total. Key features of the examination process include developing intelligence reports, use and application of intelligence analysis tools and a depth of understanding in relation to intelligence concepts and models.

Certified analysts are required to undergo a re-certification process every three years to validate currency of competence. There are two levels of certification, normal and 'life', the latter being achieved at a higher level and after a period of certification at the lower level.

Analysts gaining certification are entitled to use the postnominals "CCA" in correspondence. In 2006 the SCCA was merged into the International Association of Law Enforcement Intelligence Analysts.
