= Thomas Roach (mayor) =

American politician

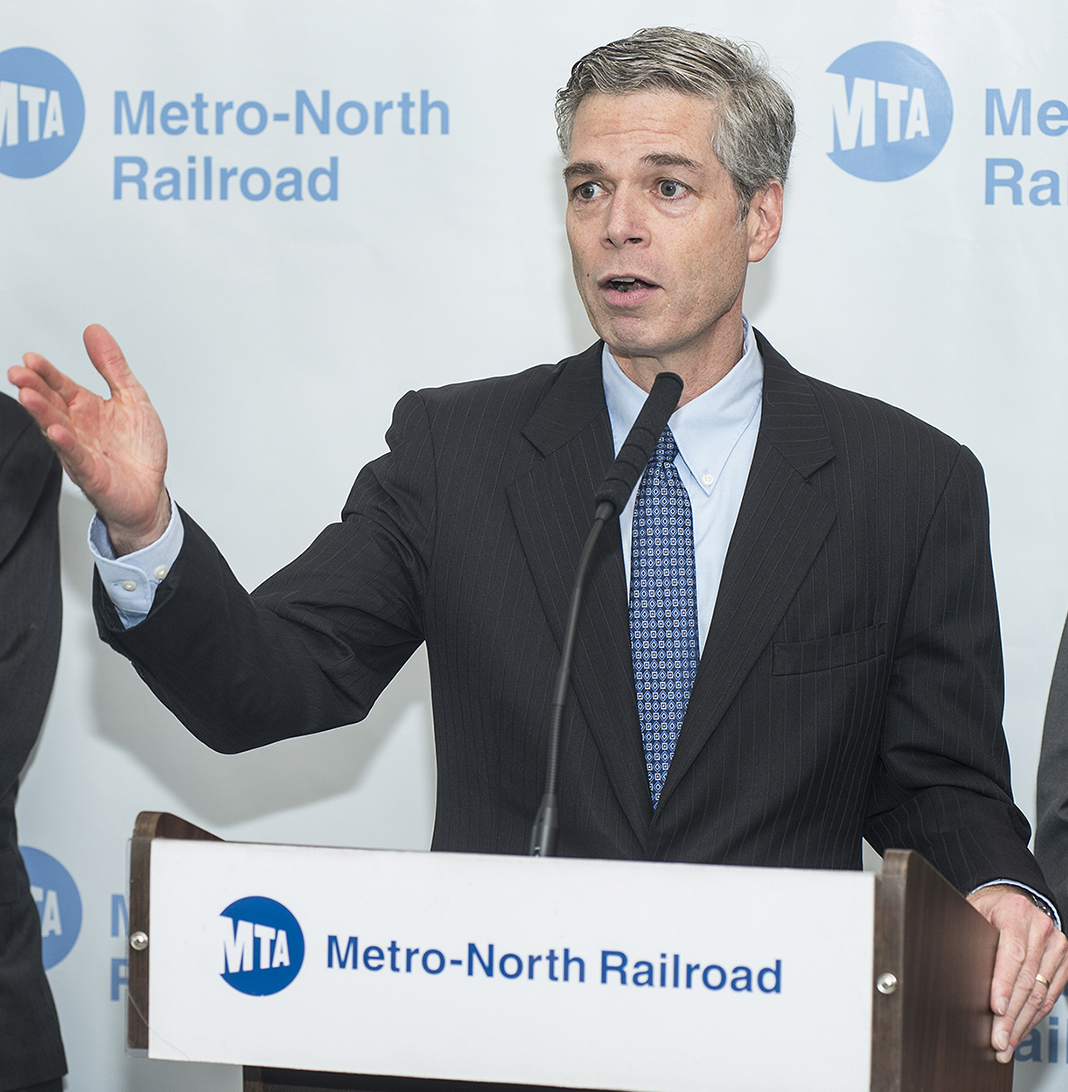

Mayor of White Plains
- In office February 19, 2011 – January 1, 2026
- Preceded by: Adam Bradley
- Succeeded by: Justin C. Brasch

Westchester County Clerk
- Incumbent
- Assumed office January 1, 2026
- Preceded by: Timothy_C._Idoni

Personal details
- Born: September 19, 1961 (age 65) White Plains, New York, U.S.
- Party: Democratic
- Education: SUNY Albany; SUNY Buffalo School of Law
- Profession: Attorney
- Website: Official website

Thomas M. Roach Jr. (born September 19, 1961) is an American politician and attorney serving as Westchester County Clerk since 2026. He was formerly the mayor of White Plains, New York. He took office as acting mayor in February 2011 following the resignation of former Mayor Adam Bradley. Roach won a March 2011 special election held to fill the remainder of Bradley's term.

== Early life and background ==
Roach was born in White Plains. He attended SUNY Albany where he received a degree in political science, and earned his Juris Doctor degree at the SUNY Buffalo School of Law. Upon graduating from law school in 1986, he represented indigent individuals in Bronx County with the Legal Aid Society.

In 1989 he entered the private practice of law in White Plains and has been primarily engaged in civil litigation since then. He was formerly employed with the firm of Mead, Hecht, Conklin, and Gallagher in Mamaroneck. Roach has two children, Henry and Lawson Roach. He is also a cancer survivor.

== Political career ==
In 2001, Roach ran for and was elected to the White Plains Common Council as a Democrat. He was reelected in 2005 and 2009.

In November 2010, Roach ran for the New York State Assembly and lost by 112 votes to incumbent Robert Castelli, who had taken office in February of that year following the resignation of former Assemblyman Adam Bradley, who had vacated the office after being elected Mayor of White Plains.

In February 2011, Bradley announced his resignation as mayor, following his December 2010 conviction for attempted assault and harassment of his wife, which was later overturned in 2013. Roach, who was as President of the Common Council at the time, succeeded him as Mayor of the City of White Plains. Roach subsequently won a March 31, 2011, special election to fill the remainder of Bradley's term.

In 2025 incumbent County Clerk Timothy C. Idoni announced his decision not to run for reelection. Roach decided to run for the position, muscling out a crowded field that includes Deputy Clerk and Port Chester trustee John Allen, Assemblymember Nader Sayegh, and county official Crystol Collins. He won the nomination unopposed and beat Sheila Marcotte, an Eastchester Town councilwoman, in the general election.

== Election results ==
- 2010 New York State Assembly election, District 89

Robert J. Castelli (REP - CON - TXP)	...	21,263 (50.1%)
Thomas M. Roach Jr. (DEM - IND - WOR)	...	21,151 (49.9%)

- March 2011 White Plains mayoral special election

Thomas M. Roach Jr. (DEM - IND - WOR)	...	4,450 (52%)
Bob Hyland (REP - CON)	...	3,020 (35%)
Glen Hockley (POP)	...	1,153 (13%)

- 2013 White Plains mayoral election

2013 White Plains Mayoral Election
Party	Candidate	Votes	%
Democratic	Thomas Roach	7,642	69.75
Working Families	Thomas Roach	338	3.09
Independence	Thomas Roach	374	3.41
Total	Thomas Roach (incumbent)	8,354	76.25
Republican	Cass Cibelli	2,206	20.14
Conservative	Cass Cibelli	396	3.61
Total	Cass Cibelli	2,602	23.75
Total votes		10,956	100

- 2017 White Plains mayoral election

2017 White Plains Mayoral Election
Party	Candidate	Votes	%	±%
Democratic	Thomas Roach	8,757	68.05	−1.70
Working Families	Thomas Roach	338	2.63	−0.46
Independence	Thomas Roach	219	1.70	−1.71
Total	Thomas Roach (incumbent)	9,314	72.38	−3.87
Republican	Milagros Lecuona	3040	23.63	3.49
Conservative	Milagros Lecuona	514	3.99	0.38
Total	Milagros Lecuona	3,554	27.62	3.87
Total votes		12,868	100	

- 2021 White Plains mayoral election
  2021 White Plains Mayoral Election
  Party	Candidate	Votes	%	±%
  Democratic	Thomas Roach	7,040	100	+27.7
  Total votes		7,040	100	

2025 Westchester County Clerk General election
Party	Candidate	Votes	%
Democratic	Thomas Roach	113,397	63.0
Working Families	Thomas Roach	8,185	4.6
Republican	Sheila Marcotte	58,281	32.4
Total votes		179,863	100.00
Democratic hold			

== See also ==
- List of mayors of White Plains, New York

Political offices
Preceded by Adam Bradley	Mayor of White Plains; 2011–2026	Succeeded by Justin C. Brasch
