= New Castle, New York =

- Town
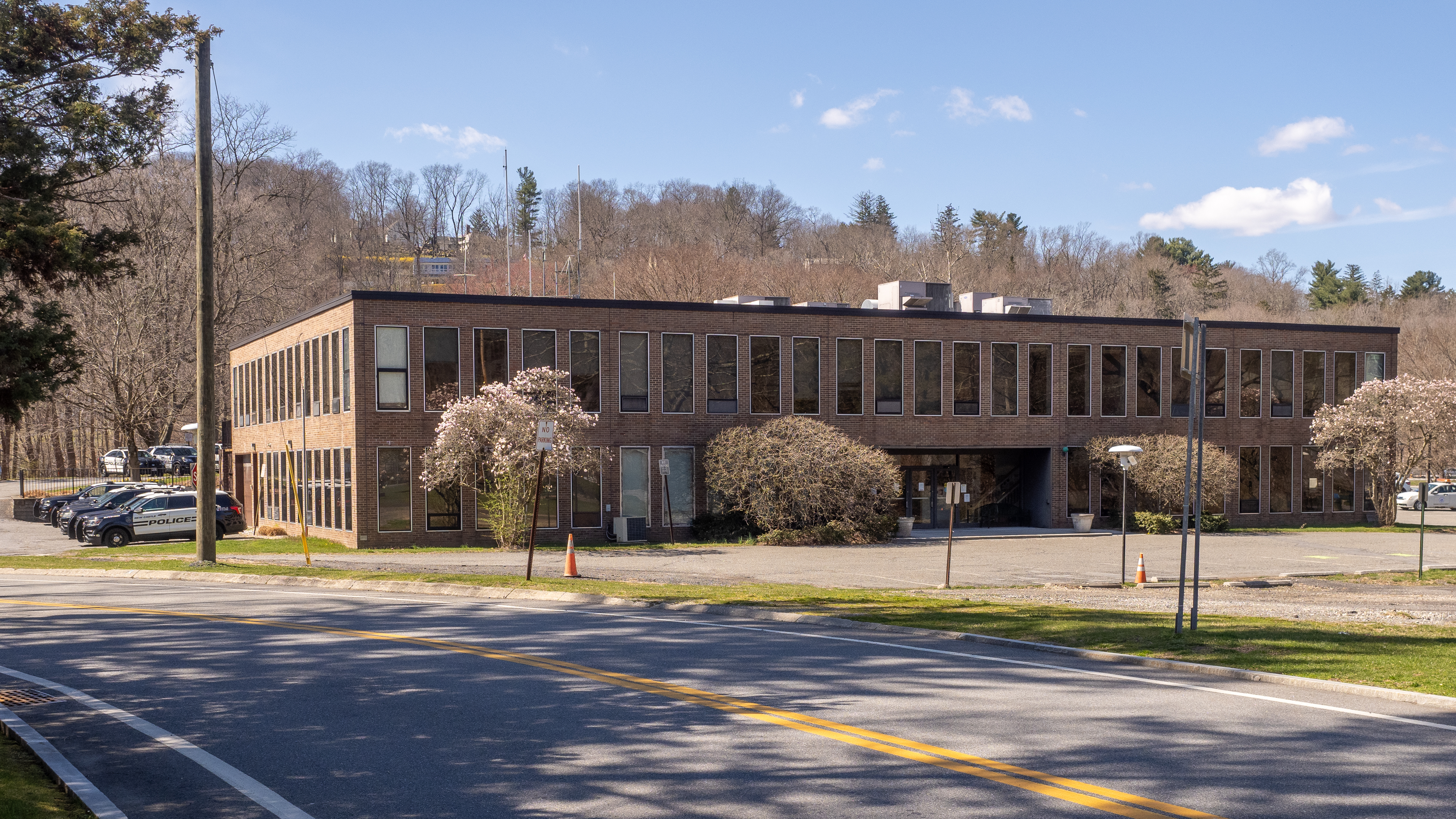
- New Castle Town Hall (2024)

- Seal

- Location of New Castle, New York
- Coordinates: 41°11′7″N 73°46′7″W
- Country: United States
- State: New York
- County: Westchester
- Founded: 1791

Government
  - Type: Town

Area
  - Total: 23.53 sq mi (60.93 km^{2})
  - Land: 23.16 sq mi (59.99 km^{2})
  - Water: 0.36 sq mi (0.94 km^{2})
- Elevation: 561 ft (171 m)

Population (2020)
  - Total: 18,311
  - Density: 790.6/sq mi (305.2/km^{2})
- Time zone: UTC-5 (Eastern (EST))
  - Summer (DST): UTC-4 (EDT)
- ZIP Codes: 10510,10514, 10546, 10549, 10562
- FIPS code: 36-50078
- GNIS feature ID: 0979260
- Website: https://www.mynewcastleny.gov/

New Castle is a town in Westchester County, New York, United States. The population was 18,311 in the 2020 United States census, an increase over 17,569 at the 2010 census. It includes the named hamlets of Chappaqua and Millwood, but residents and businesses in the Town of New Castle can also have a designated city address of Ossining, or Millwood (together commonly referred to as the "West End" of New Castle) as well as Chappaqua or even Mt. Kisco.

== History ==
New Castle was originally inhabited by Native Americans, including the Siwanoy band of the Wappinger people. Portions of New Castle were initially purchased in 1640 by Nathaniel Turner from Ponas Sagamore, chief of the Siwanoy. In 1661, John Richbell purchased land, including all of present-day New Castle, from the Siwanoy. In 1696, Caleb Heathcote purchased that tract of land from Richbell's widow. What is present-day New Castle was originally incorporated as part of the town of North Castle, which was jokingly referred to as "the two saddlebags," in 1736. The first European settlers in the area were Quakers, who settled in present-day Chappaqua in 1753 and constructed a meeting house, which still stands today on Quaker Street. The town of New Castle broke away from North Castle in 1791.

New Castle has several locations on the National Register of Historic Places, including The Williams-DuBois House, Old Chappaqua Historic District, and Isaac Young House. Two buildings from Horace Greeley's former farm are also on the National Historic Register, including the Greeley House, which houses the headquarters for the New Castle Historical Society, and Rehoboth, the first concrete barn in the country.

== Education ==
The majority of the town is served by the Chappaqua Central School District, which consists of three elementary schools, two middle schools, and one high school. The elementary schools are Grafflin Elementary School, Roaring Brook Elementary School, and Westorchard Elementary School. The middle schools are Seven Bridges Middle School and Robert E. Bell Middle School, and the high school is Horace Greeley High School, named for newspaper editor, presidential candidate and New Castle resident Horace Greeley. Other parts of New Castle fall within the Byram Hills Central School District, Bedford Central School District, Yorktown Central School District, and the Ossining Union Free School District.

== Geography ==
According to the United States Census Bureau, the town has a total area of 23.5 square miles (61 km^{2}), of which 23.2 square miles (60 km^{2}) is land and 0.3 square miles (0.78 km^{2}), or 1.15%, is water. New Castle is bordered by the towns of Mount Pleasant and Ossining to the southwest and North Castle to the southeast. It is bordered by the towns of Bedford, Mount Kisco, and Somers to the northeast and Yorktown and Cortlandt to the northwest.

== Demographics ==
Historical population
Census	Pop.	Note	%±
1820	1,368		—
1830	1,336		−2.3%
1840	1,529		14.4%
1850	1,800		17.7%
1860	1,817		0.9%
1870	2,152		18.4%
1880	2,297		6.7%
1890	2,110		−8.1%
1900	2,401		13.8%
1910	3,573		48.8%
1920	3,639		1.8%
1930	6,792		86.6%
1940	7,903		16.4%
1950	8,802		11.4%
1960	14,388		63.5%
1970	19,837		37.9%
1980	15,425		−22.2%
1990	16,648		7.9%
2000	17,491		5.1%
2010	17,569		0.4%
2020	18,311		4.2%
U.S. Decennial Census

As of the census of 2000, there were 17,491 people, 5,732 households, and 4,929 families residing in the town. The population density was 754.8 inhabitants per square mile (291.4/km^{2}). There were 5,843 housing units at an average density of 252.2 per square mile (97.4/km^{2}). The racial makeup of the town was 91.50% White, 1.37% African American, 0.05% Native American, 5.55% Asian, 0.02% Pacific Islander, 0.51% from other races, and 1.00% from two or more races. Hispanic or Latino of any race were 2.78% of the population.

There were 5,732 households, out of which 49.6% had children under the age of 18 living with them, 79.0% were married couples living together, 5.3% had a female householder with no husband present, and 14.0% were non-families. 11.4% of all households were made up of individuals, and 4.6% had someone living alone who was 65 years of age or older. The average household size was 3.04 and the average family size was 3.28.

In the town, the population was spread out, with 31.9% under the age of 18, 3.6% from 18 to 24, 25.4% from 25 to 44, 29.9% from 45 to 64, and 9.2% who were 65 years of age or older. The median age was 39 years. For every 100 females there were 97.8 males. For every 100 females age 18 and over, there were 92.2 males.

The median income for a household in the town was $159,691, and the median income for a family was $174,579. Males had a median income of $100,000 versus $67,275 for females. The per capita income for the town was $73,888. About 2.0% of families and 3.5% of the population were below the poverty line, including 4.6% of those under age 18 and 3.6% of those age 65 or over.

== Communities and locations in New Castle ==
- Chappaqua is the largest hamlet of New Castle. Its center is located in the southeastern part of the town, but most of the town falls under Chappaqua's ZIP code.
- Millwood is a hamlet located in the northwest part of the town.
- Portions of the Town of New Castle fall within the ZIP codes and school districts of Armonk, Briarcliff Manor, Mount Kisco, Ossining, and Pleasantville and Yorktown and are commonly associated with those places. Additionally, there is no one specific location within the town that is known as New Castle.

== Notable people ==
Notable people who live and have previously lived in New Castle include:

- Bill Ackman
- Dave Bickler
- Bill Clinton
- Hillary Clinton
- Andrew Cuomo
- Ace Frehley: Former lead guitarist of Kiss
- Horace Greeley
- Jonathan Klein: Former president of CNN
- Doug Scott
- Ben Stiller
- Vanessa Williams
- Kevin Regan
