= 2025 United States elections =

- ← 2023 2024 2025 2026 2027 → Off-year elections
- Election day: November 4

House elections
- Seats contested: 6 mid-term vacancies
- Net seat change: 0
- Democratic hold Republican hold No election

Gubernatorial elections
- Seats contested: 2
- Net seat change: Democratic +1
- Democratic hold Democratic gain No election

Elections were held in the United States on November 4, 2025. The off-year election included gubernatorial and state legislative elections in a few states, as well as numerous mayoral races and a variety of other local offices on the ballot. Special elections to the United States Congress for newly vacant seats also took place.

In what was widely described as a "blue wave" election, Democrats both flipped the governorship of Virginia and held onto the governorship of New Jersey by landslide margins, flipped 13 seats in the Virginia House of Delegates, flipped 5 seats in the New Jersey General Assembly (reaching a supermajority in the chamber), scored a decisive redistricting referendum victory in California, and won several other down-ballot statewide races in Virginia, Pennsylvania and Georgia. In New York City, Democrat and self-identified democratic socialist Zohran Mamdani won a three-way race in the mayoral election.

Democratic success in this election was driven by widespread concern over the economy. Voters felt that President Donald Trump was failing to deliver on his 2024 campaign promises of economic renewal from the 2021–2023 inflation surge. Many voters also felt that Trump's sweeping tariffs were worsening the state of the economy. Voters in Virginia were impacted heavily by Trump's policies, as Northern Virginia is home to many federal government workers who suffered either from the mass layoffs ordered by Trump and Elon Musk with the Department of Government Efficiency throughout the year or the concurrent federal government shutdown.

Hispanic voters swung hard to the Democratic Party after a string of rightward shifts towards the Republican Party starting in 2020, calling into question a perceived political realignment among the constituency. Some Hispanic voters expressed frustration during and after the election with Trump's handling of the economy and ICE's aggressive deportations under his administration.

Several elections also took place throughout the year, notably on April 1, 2025, which included an election for the Wisconsin Supreme Court and two special elections for the United States House of Representatives in Florida's 1st and 6th congressional districts.

== Federal elections ==
=== House of Representatives ===
Six special elections were held in 2025 to fill vacancies during the 119th U.S. Congress.

Special elections for the two Florida seats were held on April 1. The Virginia special election was held on September 9. The Arizona special election was held on September 23. The special election in Texas was held on November 4. (Note: Since no candidate received a majority of the vote in the nonpartisan primary, a runoff election was held on January 31, 2026.) The special election in Tennessee was held on December 2.

Congressional district	2025 PVI	Previous member	Previous party	Vacant since	Reason for vacancy	Replacement election	Elected member	Elected party status
Arizona's 7th	D+13	Raúl Grijalva	Democratic	March 13, 2025	Died	September 23, 2025	Adelita Grijalva	Democratic hold
Florida's 1st	R+18	Matt Gaetz	Republican	November 13, 2024	Resigned during the previous Congress, chose not to assume seat	April 1, 2025	Jimmy Patronis	Republican hold
Florida's 6th	R+14	Mike Waltz	Republican	January 20, 2025	Resigned to serve as National Security Advisor	April 1, 2025	Randy Fine	Republican hold
Tennessee's 7th	R+10	Mark Green	Republican	July 20, 2025	Resigned	December 2, 2025	Matt Van Epps	Republican hold
Texas's 18th	D+21	Sylvester Turner	Democratic	March 5, 2025	Died	November 4, 2025	Christian Menefee	Democratic hold
Virginia's 11th	D+18	Gerry Connolly	Democratic	May 21, 2025	Died	September 9, 2025	James Walkinshaw	Democratic hold

== State elections ==
=== Gubernatorial ===
Two states held gubernatorial elections in 2025:

- New Jersey: Two-term Democrat Phil Murphy was term-limited in 2025. Democratic U.S. Representative Mikie Sherrill won the open seat. Democratic hold.
- Virginia: One-term Republican Glenn Youngkin was term-limited in 2025. Democratic former U.S. Representative Abigail Spanberger won the open seat. Democratic gain.

=== Lieutenant gubernatorial ===
One state held a lieutenant governor election in 2025:

- Virginia: One-term Republican Winsome Earle-Sears retired to run for governor. Democratic state senator Ghazala Hashmi won the open seat. Democratic gain.

=== Attorney general ===
One state held an attorney general election in 2025:

- Virginia: One-term Republican Jason Miyares ran for re-election. He was defeated by Democratic former Washington, D.C. assistant attorney general Jay Jones. Democratic gain.

=== Supreme court ===
Two states held supreme court elections in 2025. One occurred on April 1, and the other on November 4.

- Wisconsin: Three-term incumbent Ann Walsh Bradley did not seek re-election in 2025. The election for the open seat on the court was held on April 1, 2025, where Judge Susan M. Crawford defeated Judge Brad Schimel.
- Pennsylvania: Three justices successfully ran for retention election in 2025: Christine Donohue, David N. Wecht, and Kevin M. Dougherty. Democratic hold.

=== Superintendent ===
One state held a superintendent election in 2025:

- Wisconsin: One-term incumbent Jill Underly ran for re-election in 2025. Underly defeated Brittany Kinser in the general election on April 1, 2025.

=== Public Service Commission ===
One state held special elections for Public Service Commission in 2025:

- Georgia: Two members of the Georgia Public Service Commission were elected in a special election after having been postponed in 2024. Democrats Alicia Johnson and Peter Hubbard successfully flipped Districts 2 and 3, held by Republicans Tim Echols and Fitz Johnson, respectively. Democratic gain.

=== Legislative ===
Legislative elections were held for the lower house of the New Jersey Legislature, and the lower house of the Virginia General Assembly.

- 2025 New Jersey General Assembly election
- 2025 Virginia House of Delegates election

There were also 97 state legislative special elections.

=== Ballot measures ===
30 ballot measures in 9 states were held in 2025, 24 of which were decided at the November general election.

== Local elections ==
=== Mayoral elections ===
Many U.S. cities held mayoral elections in 2025, including the following:

==== Runoff elections ====
- Albuquerque, New Mexico: Incumbent Democrat Tim Keller ran for re-election, but did not win a majority in the general. A runoff election between Tim Keller and Republican Darren White has taken place December 9. Keller was re-elected to a third term. Democratic hold.
- Hoboken, New Jersey: Incumbent Democrat Ravinder Bhalla retired to run for the State Assembly. Democrat Emily Jabbour was elected. Democratic hold.
- Jersey City, New Jersey: Incumbent Democrat Steven Fulop retired to run for Governor. Democrat James Solomon was elected. Democratic hold.
- Miami, Florida: Incumbent Republican Francis Suarez was ineligible to run for re-election due to term limits. Democrat Eileen Higgins defeated Republican Emilio T. Gonzalez in a runoff on December 9. Democratic gain.
- Roswell, Georgia: Incumbent Republican Kurt Wilson lost re-election to Democrat Mary Robichaux. Democratic gain.
- Sandy Springs, Georgia: Incumbent Republican Rusty Paul ran for re-election, but did not win a majority in the general. He was re-elected to a fourth term. Republican hold.
- South Fulton, Georgia: Incumbent Democrat Khalid Kamau lost re-election in the Democratic primary. Democrat Carmalitha Gumbs was elected. Democratic hold.

==== Open seats won ====
- Albany, New York: Incumbent Democrat Kathy Sheehan retired. Democrat Dorcey Applyrs was elected. Democratic hold.
- Annapolis, Maryland: Incumbent Democrat Gavin Buckley was ineligible to run for re-election due to term limits. Democrat Jared Littmann was elected. Democratic hold.
- Billings, Montana: Incumbent Bill Cole was ineligible to run for re-election due to term limits. Mike Nelson was elected.
- Dearborn Heights, Michigan: Incumbent Republican Bill Bazzi was not running for re-election. Democrat Mo Baydoun was elected. Democratic gain.
- Detroit, Michigan: Incumbent Independent Mike Duggan retired. Democrat Mary Sheffield was elected. Democratic gain.
- Fort Collins, Colorado: Incumbent Forward Democrat Jeni Arndt retired. Democrat Emily Francis was elected. Democratic hold.
- Garland, Texas: Incumbent Republican Scott LeMay was ineligible to run for re-election due to term limits. Dylan Hedrick was elected.
- Greensboro, North Carolina: Incumbent Democrat Nancy Vaughan retired. Democrat Marikay Abuzuaiter was elected. Democratic hold.
- Gulfport, Mississippi: Incumbent Republican Billy Hewes retired. Republican Hugh Keating was elected mayor, beating Former Democratic member of the Mississippi House of Representatives Sonya Williams-Barnes. Republican hold.
- Helena, Montana: Incumbent Wilmot Collins retired. Emily Dean was elected.
- Kansas City, Kansas: Incumbent Democrat Tyrone Garner retired. Democrat Christal Watson was elected. Democratic hold.
- Kalispell, Montana: Incumbent Mark Johnson retired. Ryan Hunter was elected.
- Mobile, Alabama: Incumbent Republican Sandy Stimpson retired. Republican Spiro Cheriogotis was elected. Republican hold.
- New Orleans, Louisiana: Incumbent Democrat LaToya Cantrell was ineligible to run for re-election due to term limits. Member of the New Orleans City Council Helena Moreno was elected. Democratic hold.
- New York City, New York: Incumbent Democrat Eric Adams retired. Democratic New York State Assembly member Zohran Mamdani was elected. Democratic hold.
- Oakland, California (special): Interim incumbent Democrat Kevin Jenkins did not run for a full term. Former Congresswoman Barbara Lee was elected. Democratic hold.
- San Antonio, Texas: Incumbent Independent Ron Nirenberg was ineligible to run for re-election due to term limits. Democrat Gina Ortiz Jones, former under secretary of the Air Force was elected, beating former Republican Secretary of State of Texas Rolando Pablos. Democratic gain.
- Santa Fe, New Mexico: Incumbent Democrat Alan Webber retired. Michael Garcia was elected. Democratic hold.
- Springfield, Missouri: Incumbent Republican Ken McClure retired. Jeff Schrag was elected. Republican hold.
- Syracuse, New York: Incumbent Independent Ben Walsh was ineligible to run for re-election due to term limits. Democrat Sharon Owens was elected. Democratic gain.
- Topeka, Kansas: Incumbent Democrat Mike Padilla retired. Democrat Spencer Duncan was elected. Democratic hold.
- White Plains, New York: Incumbent Tom Roach retired to run for Westchester County clerk. City councilmember Justin Brasch was elected. Democratic hold.

==== Incumbents defeated ====
- Aurora, Illinois: Incumbent Republican Richard Irvin lost re-election to Democratic Alderman John Laesch. Democratic gain.
- Bloomington, Illinois: Incumbent Independent Mboka Mwilambwe lost re-election to former Republican State Representative Dan Brady. Republican gain.
- Buffalo, New York: Acting incumbent Democrat Christopher Scanlon lost the Democratic primary to State Senator Sean Ryan, who went on to win the general election. Democratic hold.
- Dayton, Ohio: Incumbent Democrat Jeff Mims lost re-election to Democratic City Commissioner Shenise Turner-Sloss. Democratic hold.
- Erie, Pennsylvania: Incumbent Democrat Joe Schember lost renomination to Daria Devlin who won the general election. Democratic hold.
- Fairbanks, Alaska: Incumbent Republican David Pruhs lost re-election to Democrat Mindy O'Neall. Democratic gain.
- Hialeah, Florida: Interim incumbent Republican Jacqueline Garcia-Roves lost re-election to Republican Bryan Calvo. Republican hold.
- Jackson, Mississippi: Incumbent Democrat Chokwe Antar Lumumba lost renomination in the primary to State Senator John Horhn, who went on to win the general election. Democratic hold.
- Norman, Oklahoma: Incumbent Republican Larry Heikkila lost re-election to Democrat Stephen Tyler Holman. Democratic gain.
- Omaha, Nebraska: Incumbent Republican Jean Stothert lost re-election to Democrat John Ewing Jr.. Democratic gain.
- Pittsburgh, Pennsylvania: Incumbent Democrat Ed Gainey lost re-election in the primary to Democrat Corey O'Connor, who went on to win the general election. Democratic hold.
- Richardson, Texas: Incumbent Bob Dubey lost re-election to Democrat Amir Omar. Democratic gain.
- Roswell, Georgia: Incumbent mayor Republican Kurt Wilson lost re-election to Democrat Mary Robichaux after being forced to a runoff Democratic gain.
- Seattle, Washington: Incumbent Democrat Bruce Harrell lost re-election to Democrat Katie Wilson. Democratic hold.
- St. Louis, Missouri: Incumbent Democrat Tishaura Jones lost re-election to Democrat Cara Spencer in the general election. Democratic hold.
- St. Paul, Minnesota: Incumbent Democrat-Farmer-Labor Melvin Carter lost re-election to Democrat-Farmer-Labor Kaohly Her. Democratic hold.
- Stratford, Connecticut: Incumbent Republican Laura Hoydick lost re-election to Democrat David Chess. Democratic gain.

==== Incumbents re-elected ====
- Allentown, Pennsylvania: Incumbent Democrat Matthew Tuerk was re-elected to a second term.
- Atlanta, Georgia: Incumbent Democrat Andre Dickens was re-elected to a second term.
- Atlantic City, New Jersey: Incumbent Democrat Marty Small Sr. was re-elected to a second term.
- Biloxi, Mississippi: Incumbent Republican Andrew Gilich was re-elected to a third term.
- Birmingham, Alabama: Incumbent Democrat Randall Woodfin was re-elected to a third term.
- Boston, Massachusetts: Incumbent Democrat Michelle Wu was re-elected to a second term.
- Cedar Rapids, Iowa: Incumbent Republican Tiffany O'Donnell was re-elected to a second term.
- Charlotte, North Carolina: Incumbent Democrat Vi Lyles was re-elected to a fifth term.
- Chattanooga, Tennessee: Incumbent Independent Tim Kelly was re-elected to a second term.
- Cincinnati, Ohio: Incumbent Democrat Aftab Pureval was re-elected to a second term.
- Cleveland, Ohio: Incumbent Democrat Justin Bibb was re-elected to a second term.
- Columbia, Missouri: Incumbent Barbara Buffaloe was re-elected to a second term.
- Columbia, South Carolina: Incumbent Republican Daniel Rickenmann was re-elected to a second term.
- Concord, New Hampshire: Incumbent Democrat Byron Champlin was re-elected to a second term.
- Dearborn, Michigan: Incumbent Democrat Abdullah Hammoud was re-elected to a second term.
- Durham, North Carolina: Incumbent Democrat Leonardo Williams was re-elected to a second term.
- Fayetteville, North Carolina: Incumbent Democrat Mitch Colvin was re-elected to a second term.
- Fort Worth, Texas: Incumbent Republican Mattie Parker was re-elected to a third term.
- Harrisburg, Pennsylvania: Incumbent Democrat Wanda Williams was re-elected to a second term.
- Lansing, Michigan: Incumbent Democrat Andy Schor was re-elected to a third term.
- Manchester, New Hampshire: Incumbent Republican Jay Ruais was re-elected to a second term.
- Minneapolis, Minnesota: Incumbent Democratic–Farmer–Labor candidate Jacob Frey was re-elected to a third term.
- Missoula, Montana: Incumbent Andrea Davis was re-elected to a second term.
- New Haven, Connecticut: Incumbent Democrat Justin Elicker was re-elected to a second term.
- Plano, Texas: Incumbent John Muns was re-elected to a second term.
- Rochester, New York: Incumbent Democrat Malik Evans was re-elected to a second term.
- Saratoga Springs, New York: Incumbent Republican John Safford was re-elected to a second term.
- Scranton, Pennsylvania: Incumbent Democrat Paige Cognetti was re-elected to a second term.
- Stamford, Connecticut: Incumbent Democrat Caroline Simmons was re-elected to a second term.
- Sterling Heights, Michigan: Incumbent Independent Michael C. Taylor was re-elected to a fourth term.
- Toledo, Ohio: Incumbent Democrat Wade Kapszukiewicz was re-elected to a third term.
- Tupelo, Mississippi: Incumbent Republican Todd Jordan was re-elected to a second term.
- Tuscaloosa, Alabama: Incumbent Democrat Walt Maddox was re-elected to a sixth term.
- Rockford, Illinois: Incumbent Democrat Tom McNamara was re-elected to a third term.

=== Other municipal elections ===
- Boston, Massachusetts: City Council
- Bloomington, Minnesota: City Council, school board
- Charlotte, North Carolina: City Council
- Cleveland, Ohio: City Council
- Columbus, Ohio: City Council, Columbus City Schools Board of Education
- Knoxville, Tennessee: City Council
- Manchester, New Hampshire: Board of Mayor and Aldermen
- Minneapolis, Minnesota: City Council, other municipal offices
- New York, New York: Comptroller, Public Advocate, City Council, borough presidents
- Seattle, Washington: City Council, City Attorney

=== County elections ===
- Allegheny County, Pennsylvania: County council Democratic hold.
- Berks County, Pennsylvania: Eric J. Taylor (Democrat) was elected to Judge of Court of Common Pleas
- Bucks County, Pennsylvania
- Dane County, Wisconsin: County executive Democratic hold.
- Delaware County, Pennsylvania
- Erie County, Pennsylvania: 2025 Erie County, Pennsylvania Executive election. Incumbent Republican Brenton Davis lost re-election to Democrat Christina Vogel. Democratic gain.
- Hudson County, New Jersey: Sheriff Democratic gain.
- Jackson County, Missouri: Democrat Frank White was recalled. Former Kansas City Mayor Kay Barnes was appointed as interim County Executive for 30 days.
- King County, Washington: County Executive, County Council Democratic hold.
- Lehigh County, Pennsylvania: County Executive and County council. Democratic hold.
- Nassau County, New York: County Executive, District Attorney, and County legislature Republican hold.
- Northampton County, Pennsylvania: 2025 Northampton County Executive election County Controller Tara Zriniski (D) faces county councilman Tom Giovanni (R). Democratic hold.
- Orange County, New York: County Executive Republican hold.
- Prince George's County, Maryland: County executive (special) Aisha Braveboy was elected over Jonathan White in a landslide. Democratic hold.
- Rensselaer County, New York: County Executive Republican hold.
- Westchester County, New York: County Executive, preceded by February special election Democratic hold.
- Winnebago County, Wisconsin: County Executive Democratic gain.
