= Alexander Rose =

Alexander or Alex Rose may refer to:

- Alexander Rose (bishop) (1647–1720)
- Alexander Rose (geologist) (1781–1860), Scottish geologist
- Alexander Rose (author) (born 1971), author and historian
- Alex Rose (labor leader) (1898–1976), New York politician
- Alex Rose (discus thrower) (b. 1991), American/Samoan discus thrower
- Alex Rose (politician), Pennsylvania politician
- Alexander Rose, Executive Director of the Long Now Foundation
- Alex Rose, musician, member of Minus the Bear

== See also ==
- Axl Rose (born 1962), American musician
