= 2023 Springfield, Missouri, mayoral election =

- April 4, 2023

Nominee	Ken McClure	Melanie Bach
Party	Nonpartisan	Nonpartisan
Popular vote	10,484	9,232
Percentage	53.18%	46.82%

Springfield, Missouri held an election for mayor on April 4, 2023. Incumbent mayor Ken McClure faced off against fellow candidate Melanie Bach. McClure was re-elected mayor by a margin of roughly six percentage points, winning 53.18% to Bach’s 46.82%. Springfield mayoral elections are nonpartisan and candidates are not affiliated with a specific party on ballots.

== Background ==
McClure had been mayor of Springfield since 2017, taking over from former mayor Bob Stevens. Bach, originally from Memphis, Tennessee, and president of the Galloway Village Neighborhood Association, announced her candidacy for mayor in December 2022. McClure went on to win a final term as mayor, earning 53% of the total vote. Bach conceded the election to McClure and asked that the city work in building positive relationships with the city’s neighborhoods.

== Results ==
2023 Springfield Mayoral Race
Party	Candidate	Votes	%
Nonpartisan	Ken McClure (incumbent)	10,484	53.18
Nonpartisan	Melanie Bach	9,232	46.82
Total votes		19,716	100.00
