= 2025 Springfield, Missouri mayoral election =

- April 4, 2025
Nominee	Jeff Schrag	Mary Collette
Party	Nonpartisan	Nonpartisan
Popular vote	8,702	5,447
Percentage	61.50%	38.50%
Mayor before election
Ken McClure
Elected mayor
Jeff Schrag

The 2025 Springfield, Missouri mayoral election was held on April 8, 2025, to elect the next mayor of Springfield, Missouri. Incumbent mayor Ken McClure was term-limited after serving four terms, and could not seek re-election. Businessman Jeff Schrag won against former city councilmember Mary Collette, and will serve a four-year term after voters approved the change in 2024.

== Background ==
Ken McClure had been mayor of Springfield since 2017, taking over from former mayor Bob Stevens. Just over a year before the election, Springfield voters approved an amendment to the city charter to extend each mayoral term to four years, with a new limit of two terms.

== Candidates ==
=== Declared ===
- Jeff Schrag, businessman and CEO
- Mary Collette, former city councilmember (2001–2009)

== Results ==
2025 Springfield mayoral election
Party	Candidate	Votes	%
Nonpartisan	Jeff Schrag	8,702	61.50%
Nonpartisan	Mary Collette	5,447	38.50%
Total votes		14,149	100.00%
