= 2025 Erie County, Pennsylvania Executive election =

2025 Erie County Executive election
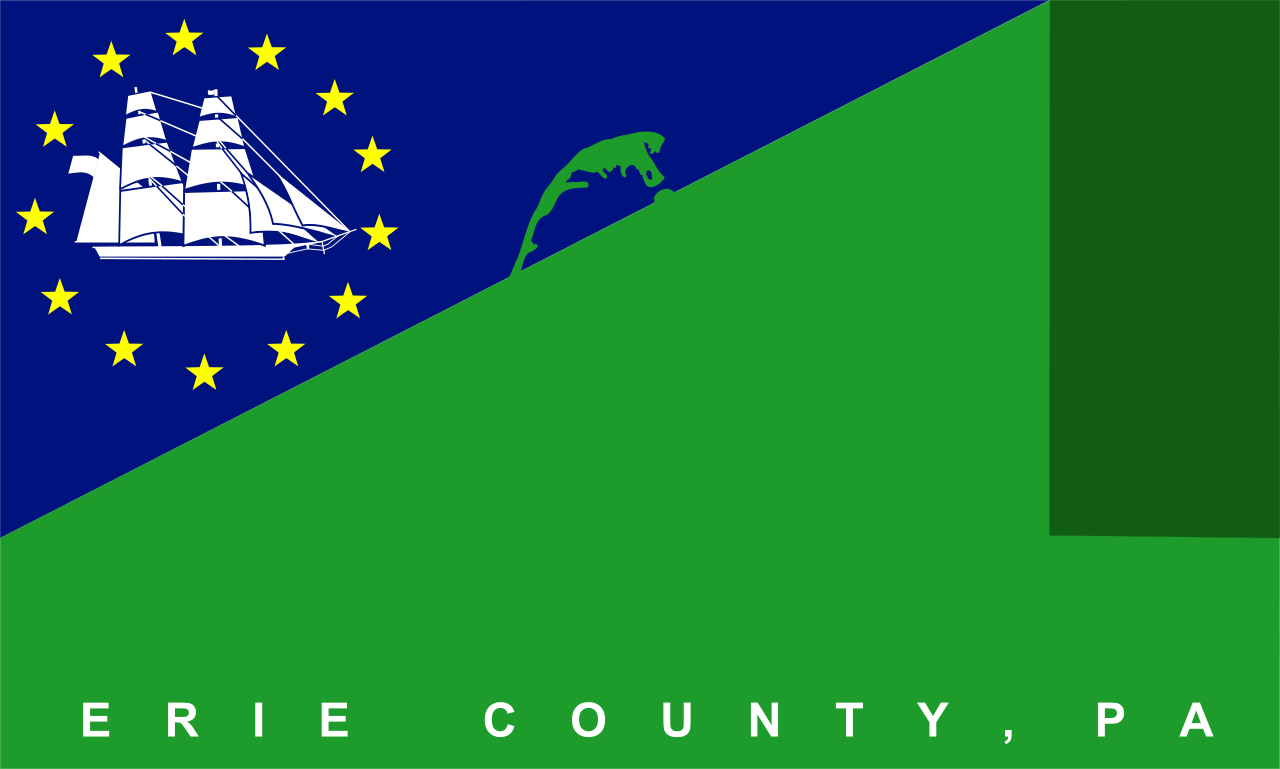
- November 4, 2025

Nominee	Christina Vogel	Brenton Davis
Party	Democratic	Republican
Popular vote	47,680	28,627
Percentage	62.36%	37.44%
- Precinct results Vogel: 50–60% 60–70% 70–80% 80–90% >90% Davis: 40–50% 50–60% 60–70% Tie: 50%
County Executive before election
Brenton Davis
Republican
Elected County Executive
Christina Vogel
Democratic

The 2025 Erie County Executive election was held on November 4, 2025. Incumbent County Executive Brenton Davis, first elected in 2021, sought reelection to a second term, but was defeated in the general election by businesswoman Christina Vogel, the Democratic nominee.

== Democratic primary ==
=== Candidates ===
- Christina Vogel, businesswoman, Erie County Community College trustee
- Perry Wood, executive director of the Erie County Gaming Revenue Authority

=== Results ===
Results by precinct Vogel: 40–50%; 50–60%; 60–70%; 70–80%; Wood: 50–60%; 60–70%; Tie: 50%

Democratic primary results
Party	Candidate	Votes	%
Democratic	Christina Vogel	13,440	52.33%
Democratic	Perry Wood	12,153	47.32%
Democratic	Write-ins	89	0.35%
Total votes		25,682	100.00%

== Republican primary ==
=== Candidates ===
- Brenton Davis, incumbent County Executive

=== Results ===
Republican primary results
Party	Candidate	Votes	%
Republican	Brenton Davis (incumbent)	12,730	94.18%
Republican	Write-ins	787	5.82%
Total votes		13,517	100.00%

== General election ==
=== Candidates ===
- Brenton Davis, incumbent County Executive (Republican)
- Christina Vogel, businesswoman, Erie County Community College trustee (Democratic)

=== Results ===
2025 Erie County Executive general election
Party	Candidate	Votes	%
Democratic	Christina Vogel	47,680	62.36%
Republican	Brenton Davis (incumbent)	28,627	37.44%
Write-in		148	0.19%
Total votes		76,455	100.00%
Democratic gain from Republican			
