= 2021 Erie County, Pennsylvania Executive election =

2021 Erie County Executive election
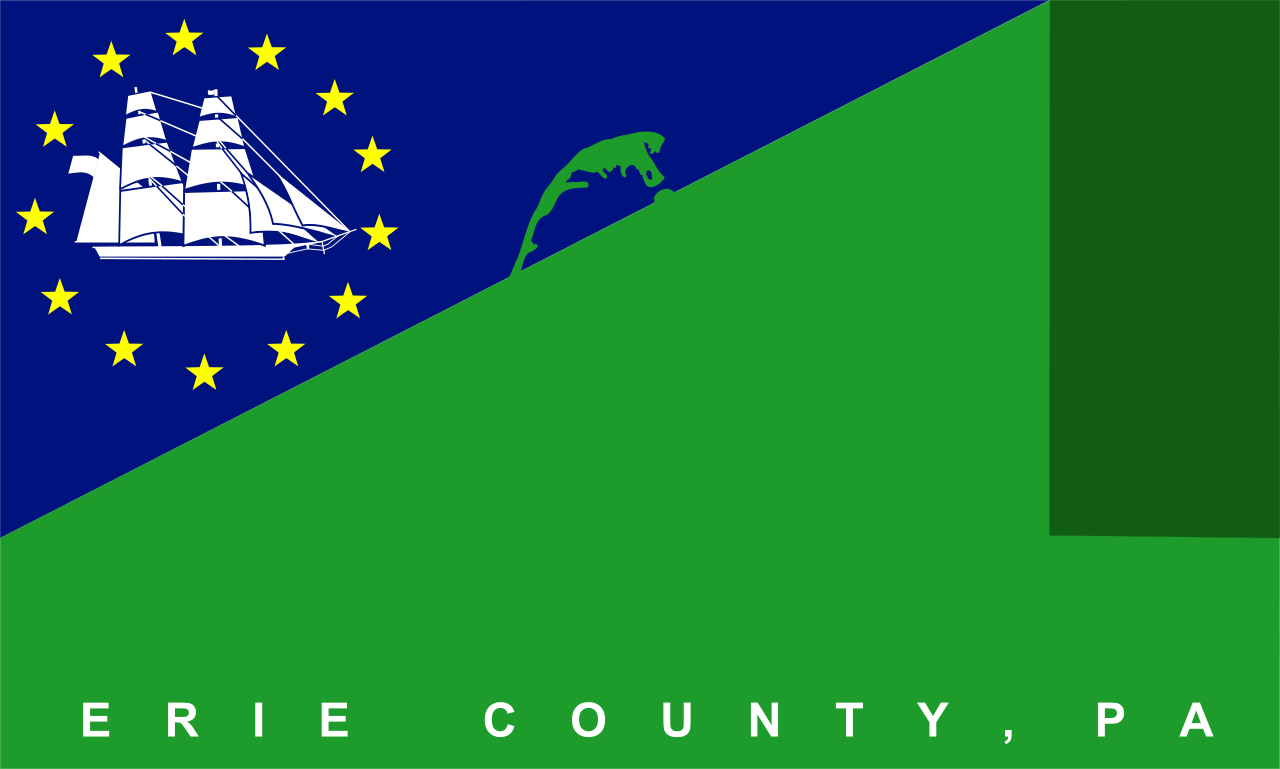
- November 2, 2021

Nominee	Brenton Davis	Tyler Titus
Party	Republican	Democratic
Popular vote	34,569	31,993
Percentage	51.94%	48.06%
- Precinct results Davis: 40–50% 50–60% 60–70% 70–80% Titus: 40–50% 50–60% 60–70% 70–80% 80–90% Tie: 40–50%
County Executive before election
Kathy Dahlkemper
Democratic
Elected County Executive
Brenton Davis
Republican

The 2021 Erie County Executive election was held on November 2, 2021. Incumbent Democratic County Executive Kathy Dahlkemper declined to run for re-election to a third term. Tyler Titus, the President of the Erie City School District, and the first openly transgender person elected to office in Pennsylvania, narrowly won the Democratic primary to succeed Dahlkemper. In the general election, Titus faced the Republican nominee, Brenton Davis, the owner of a construction company and an unsuccessful candidate for County Executive in 2017. Davis narrowly defeated Titus, winning 52–48 percent, becoming the first Republican elected County Executive since 2001.

== Democratic primary ==
=== Candidates ===
- Tyler Titus, President of the Erie City School District
- Carl Anderson, County Councilman
- Dylan Grasinger, director of the International Institute of Erie
- Rita Bishop, county IT employee

=== Results ===
Results by precinct Titus: 20–30%; 30–40%; 40–50%; 50–60%; Anderson: 20–30%; 30–40%; 40–50%; Grasinger: 30–40%; 40–50%; Bishop: 20–30%; 30–40%; 40–50%; 50–60%; Tie: 20–30%; 30–40%

Democratic primary results
Party	Candidate	Votes	%
Democratic	Tyler Titus	8,769	32.17%
Democratic	Carl Anderson	8,551	31.37%
Democratic	Dylanna Grasinger	5,669	20.80%
Democratic	Rita Bishop	4,272	15.67%
Total votes		27,261	100.00%

== Republican primary ==
=== Candidates ===
- Brenton Davis, construction company owner, 2017 Republican candidate for County Executive
- Shawn Wroblewski, paramedic

=== Results ===
Results by precinct Davis: 40–50%; 50–60%; 60–70%; 70–80%; 80–90%; Wroblewski: 40–50%; 50–60%; 60–70%; 70–80%; 80–90%; Tie: 40–50%; 50%

Republican primary results
Party	Candidate	Votes	%
Republican	Brenton Davis	10,171	54.87%
Republican	Shawn Wroblewski	8,367	45.13%
Total votes		18,538	100.00%

== General election ==
=== Results ===
2021 Erie County Executive election
Party	Candidate	Votes	%
Republican	Brenton Davis	34,569	51.94%
Democratic	Tyler Titus	31,993	48.06%
Total votes		66,562	100.00%
Republican gain from Democratic			
