= 2017 Erie County, Pennsylvania Executive election =

2017 Erie County Executive election
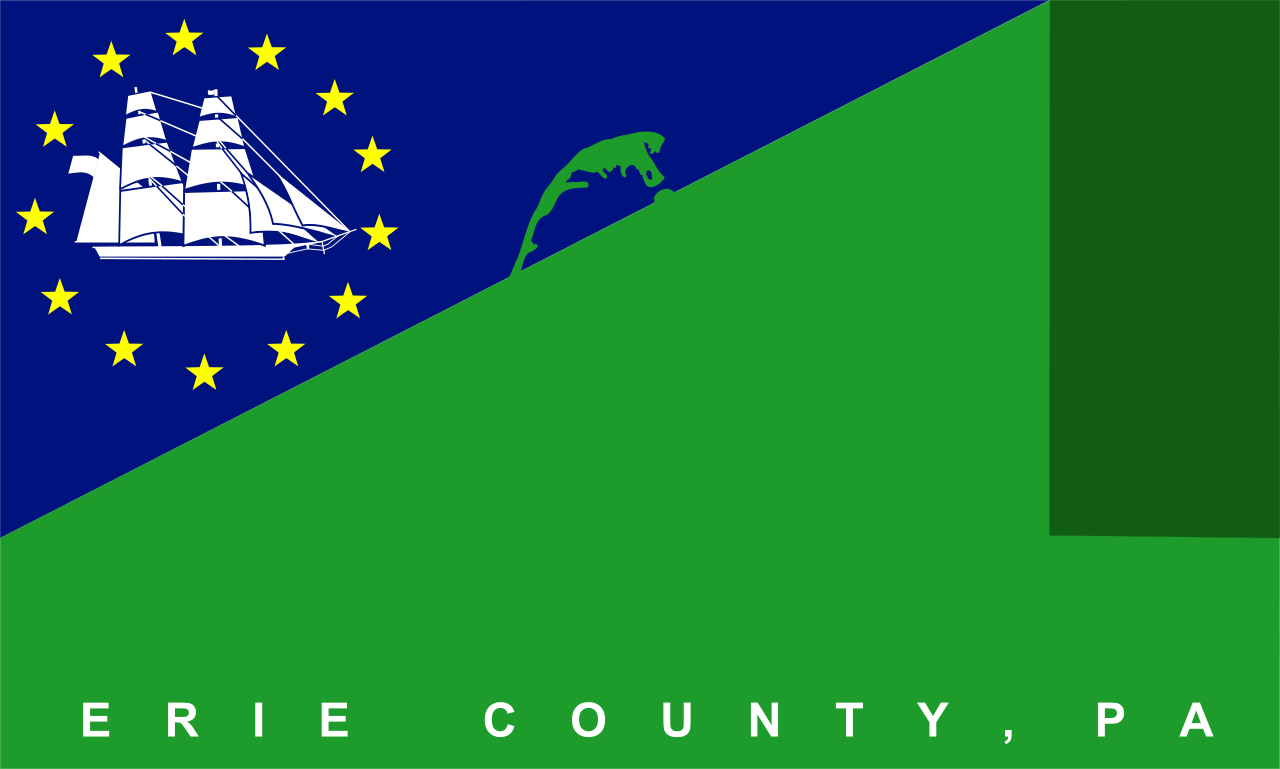
- November 7, 2017
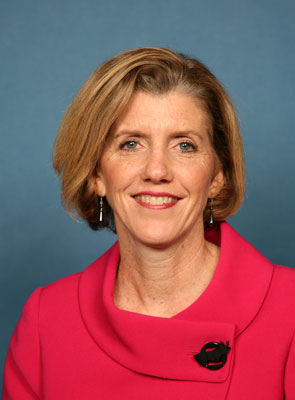

Nominee	Kathy Dahlkemper	Art Oligeri
Party	Democratic	Republican
Popular vote	30,454	30,150
Percentage	50.25%	49.75%
County Executive before election
Kathy Dahlkemper
Democratic
Elected County Executive
Kathy Dahlkemper
Democratic

The 2017 Erie County Executive election was held on November 7, 2017. Incumbent Democratic County Executive Kathy Dahlkemper ran for re-election to a second term. She won renomation and then faced businessman Art Oligeri, the Republican nominee, in the general election. Despite Donald Trump's victory in the county in the 2016 presidential election, Dahlkemper narrowly defeated Oligeri, winning re-election by a 304-vote margin.

== Democratic primary ==
=== Candidates ===
- Kathy Dahlkemper, incumbent County Executive
- Joseph K. Curlett, retired state employee

=== Results ===
Democratic primary results
Party	Candidate	Votes	%
Democratic	Kathy Dahlkemper (inc.)	16,314	67.66%
Democratic	Joseph K. Curlett	7,589	31.47%
Democratic	Write-ins	210	0.87%
Total votes		24,113	100.00%

== Republican primary ==
=== Candidates ===
- Art Oligeri, businessman
- Brenton Davis, construction company owner
- Edward DiMattio, County Councilman
- Tim Sonney, Erie city employee
- Tom Loftus, former Lawrence Park Township Commissioner, 2013 Republican candidate for County Executive

=== Results ===
Republican primary results
Party	Candidate	Votes	%
Republican	Art Oligeri	4,789	29.66%
Republican	Brenton Davis	4,575	28.33%
Republican	Edward DiMattio	2,878	17.82%
Republican	Tim Sonney	2,655	16.44%
Republican	Tom Loftus	1,180	7.31%
Republican	Write-ins	71	0.44%
Total votes		16,148	100.00%

== General election ==
=== Results ===
2017 Erie County Executive election
Party	Candidate	Votes	%
Democratic	Kathy Dahlkemper (inc.)	30,454	50.25%
Republican	Art Oligeri	30,150	49.75%
Total votes		60,604	100.00%
Democratic hold			
