= 2025 Tupelo mayoral election =

Mississippi election

- June 3, 2025
Candidate	Todd Jordan
Party	Republican
Popular vote	822
Percentage	97.62%
Mayor before election
Todd Jordan
Republican
Elected mayor
Todd Jordan
Republican

The 2025 mayoral election in Tupelo, Mississippi took place on June 3, 2025, alongside other Tupelo municipal races. Incumbent mayor Todd Jordan won re-election to a second four-year term. Primary elections took place on April 1. A run-off was also scheduled on April 22 if neither candidate wins.

== Republican primary ==
=== Candidates ===
==== Qualified ====
- Rob Chambers, executive director of the Conservative Coalition of Mississippi
- Todd Jordan, incumbent mayor (2021–present)

=== Results ===
Republican primary results
Party	Candidate	Votes	%
Republican	Todd Jordan (incumbent)	3,065	83.77
Republican	Rob Chambers	594	16.23
Total votes		3,659	100.00

== Democratic primary ==
=== Candidates ===
There were no candidates for the Democratic Party in this election.

== General election ==
=== Results ===
2025 Tupelo mayoral election
Party	Candidate	Votes	%
Republican	Todd Jordan (incumbent)	822	97.62
Write-in		20	2.38
Total votes		842	100.0%
Republican hold			
