= 2025 Allegheny County Council election =

2025 local election

- November 4, 2025

8 of 15 seats on the Allegheny County Council 8 seats needed for a majority
	First party	Second party	Third party
Party	Democratic	Republican	Independent
Seats before	13	2	0
Seats after	13	1	1
Seat change	Steady	▼1	▲1
- Results: Democratic hold Labor/Independent gain No election
Council president before election
Patrick J. Catena
Democratic
Elected Council president
Patrick J. Catena
Democratic

The 2025 Allegheny County Council election will be held on November 4, 2025, to elect eight members to the Allegheny County Council. Primary elections were held on May 20, 2025.

== At-large (special) ==
The special election for the at-large seat was scheduled following the appointment of Mike Embrescia to the council. As one party cannot hold both at-large seats, it was originally expected that Embrescia would be unopposed in the general election. Following the candidacy of Alex Rose, the Republican Party challenged the requirement to hold the special election.

An Allegheny County Common Pleas judge ruled on June 4 that the election would go on as planned. The decision was appealed to the Commonwealth Court of Pennsylvania, where the ruling was again upheld. Embrescia then appealed to ruling to the Supreme Court of Pennsylvania in August, where the Supreme Court again upheld the ruling.

After the election, Rose is essentially a Democratic voice on the council, as he has previously worked on campaigns for Democratic Party candidates.

=== Republican primary ===
==== Candidates ====
===== Nominee =====
- Mike Embrescia, incumbent councilor

==== Results ====
Republican primary
Party	Candidate	Votes	%
Republican	Mike Embrescia (incumbent)	39,206	98.49
Write-in		600	1.51
Total votes		39,806	100.00

=== Third party and independent candidates ===
==== Green Party ====
===== Withdrawn =====
- Theron Gilliland Jr., researcher and co-chair of the Green Party of Pennsylvania

==== Declared ====
- Alex Rose, Democratic campaign worker

=== General election ===
==== Endorsements ====
Mike Embrescia (R)

Labor unions

- Laborers' International Union of North America
- United Association Steamfitters Local 449
- Boilermakers Local 154
- Fraternal Order of Police Lodges 1 and 91
Alex Rose (I)

U.S. representatives

- Chris Deluzio, PA-17 (2023–present) (Democratic)

State legislators

- Nick Pisciottano, state senator from the 45th district (2025–present) (Democratic)
- Emily Kinkead, state representative from the 20th district (2021–present) (Democratic)
- John Inglis, state representative from the 38th district (2024–present) (Democratic)
- Joe McAndrew, state representative from the 32nd district (2023–present) (Democratic)

==== Results ====
Results by precinct Rose: 40–50%; 50–60%; 60–70%; 70–80%; 80–90%; >90%; Embrescia: 40–50%; 50–60%; 60–70%; 70–80%; Tie: 40–50%; 50%

2025 Allegheny County Council election, at-large special
Party	Candidate	Votes	%
Independent	Alex Rose	185,197	56.34
Republican	Mike Embrescia (incumbent)	140,872	42.86
Write-in		2,630	0.80
Total votes		328,699	100.00

== District 1 ==
=== Democratic primary ===
==== Candidates ====
===== Declared =====
- Kathleen Madonna-Emerling, senior development associate
- Carl Villella, business owner

==== Results ====
Democratic primary
Party	Candidate	Votes	%
Democratic	Kathleen Madonna-Emerling	7,464	76.18
Democratic	Carl Villella	2,293	23.40
Write-in		41	0.42
Total votes		9,798	100.00

=== Republican primary ===
==== Candidates ====
===== Nominee =====
- Mary Jo Wise

==== Results ====
Republican primary
Party	Candidate	Votes	%
Republican	Mary Jo Wise	4,304	97.73
Write-in		100	2.27
Total votes		4,404	100.00

=== General election ===
==== Results ====
2025 Allegheny County Council election, district 1
Party	Candidate	Votes	%
Democratic	Kathleen Madonna-Emmerling	19,515	60.79
Republican	Mary Jo Wise	12,557	39.11
Write-in		31	0.10
Total votes		32,103	100.00

== District 3 ==
=== Democratic primary ===
==== Candidates ====
===== Nominee =====
- Lissa Geiger Shulman, advocate

==== Results ====
Democratic primary
Party	Candidate	Votes	%
Democratic	Lissa Geiger Shulman	10,079	99.11
Write-in		90	0.89
Total votes		10,169	100.00

=== Republican primary ===
==== Candidates ====
===== Nominee =====
- W. Christopher Lochner, municipal manager

==== Results ====
Republican primary
Party	Candidate	Votes	%
Republican	W. Christopher Lochner	4,434	98.45
Write-in		70	1.55
Total votes		4,504	100.00

=== General election ===
==== Results ====
2025 Allegheny County Council election, district 3
Party	Candidate	Votes	%
Democratic	Lissa Geiger Shulman	21,942	60.30
Republican	W. Christopher Lochner	14,418	39.62
Write-in		27	0.07
Total votes		36,387	100.00

== District 4 ==
=== Democratic primary ===
==== Candidates ====
===== Nominee =====
- Patrick J. Catena Jr., incumbent councilor

==== Results ====
Democratic primary
Party	Candidate	Votes	%
Democratic	Patrick J. Catena Jr. (incumbent)	8,282	98.89
Write-in		93	1.11
Total votes		8,375	100.00

=== Republican primary ===
==== Candidates ====
===== Nominee =====
- Bob Doddato

==== Results ====
Republican primary
Party	Candidate	Votes	%
Republican	Bob Doddato	3,222	97.52
Write-in		82	2.48
Total votes		3,304	100.00

=== General election ===
==== Results ====
2025 Allegheny County Council election, district 4
Party	Candidate	Votes	%
Democratic	Patrick J. Catena Jr. (incumbent)	16,993	60.49
Republican	Bob Doddato	11,061	39.38
Write-in		37	0.13
Total votes		28,091	100.00

== District 8 ==
=== Democratic primary ===
==== Candidates ====
===== Nominee =====
- Michelle Naccarati-Chapkis, incumbent councilor

==== Results ====
Democratic primary
Party	Candidate	Votes	%
Democratic	Michelle Maccarati-Chapkis (incumbent)	8,916	99.20
Write-in		72	0.80
Total votes		8,988	100.00

=== Republican primary ===
==== Candidates ====
===== Nominee =====
- Michael Dell

==== Results ====
Republican primary
Party	Candidate	Votes	%
Republican	Michael Dell	3,021	98.82
Write-in		36	1.18
Total votes		3,057	100.00

=== General election ===
==== Results ====
2025 Allegheny County Council election, district 8
Party	Candidate	Votes	%
Democratic	Michelle Naccarati-Chapkis (incumbent)	18,338	67.35
Republican	Michael Dell	8,862	32.55
Write-in		27	0.10
Total votes		27,227	100.00

== District 9 ==
=== Democratic primary ===
==== Candidates ====
===== Nominee =====
- Aaron Adams, Duquesne city councilor

===== Eliminated in primary =====
- Dylan Altemara, student coach
- Kellianne Frketic, inventory control coordinator

==== Results ====
Democratic primary
Party	Candidate	Votes	%
Democratic	Aaron Adams	5,401	54.74
Democratic	Kellianne Frketic	2,845	28.84
Democratic	Dylan Altemara	1,472	14.92
Write-in		148	1.50
Total votes		9,866	100.00

=== Republican primary ===
==== Candidates ====
===== Nominee =====
- Patrick Provins (write-in)

==== Results ====
Republican primary
Party	Candidate	Votes	%
	Write-in	900	100.00
Total votes		900	100.00

=== General election ===
==== Results ====
2025 Allegheny County Council election, district 9
Party	Candidate	Votes	%
Democratic	Aaron Adams	15,186	61.92
Republican	Patrick Provins	9,285	37.86
Write-in		54	0.22
Total votes		24,525	100.00

== District 12 ==
=== Democratic primary ===
==== Candidates ====
===== Nominee =====
- Robert J. Palmosina, incumbent councilor

==== Results ====
Democratic primary
Party	Candidate	Votes	%
Democratic	Robert J. Palmosina (incumbent)	11,820	98.58
Write-in		170	1.42
Total votes		11,990	100.00

=== Republican primary ===
==== Candidates ====
===== Nominee =====
- Leonard Iorio (write-in)

==== Results ====
Republican primary
Party	Candidate	Votes	%
	Write-in	510	100.00
Total votes		510	100.00

=== General election ===
==== Results ====
2025 Allegheny County Council election, district 12
Party	Candidate	Votes	%
Democratic	Robert J. Palmosina (incumbent)	21,849	73.33
Republican	Leonard Iorio	7,888	26.48
Write-in		57	0.19
Total votes		29,794	100.00

== District 13 (special) ==
=== Democratic committee selection ===
==== Candidates ====
===== Nominee =====
- Jordan Botta, interim councilor

===== Not selected =====
- Daylon Davis, former NAACP Pittsburgh chair
- RIchard Valorie, Northside
- Jon Hanrahan, resident

=== Republican committee selection ===
==== Candidates ====
===== Nominee =====
- Todd McCollum, Pittsburgh Republican city committee chair

=== General election ===
==== Results ====
2025 Allegheny County Council special election, district 13
Party	Candidate	Votes	%
Democratic	Jordan Botta	24,674	84.37
Republican	Todd McCollum	4,511	15.42
Write-in		61	0.21
Total votes		29,246	100.00
