= 2013 Erie County, Pennsylvania Executive election =

2013 Erie County Executive election
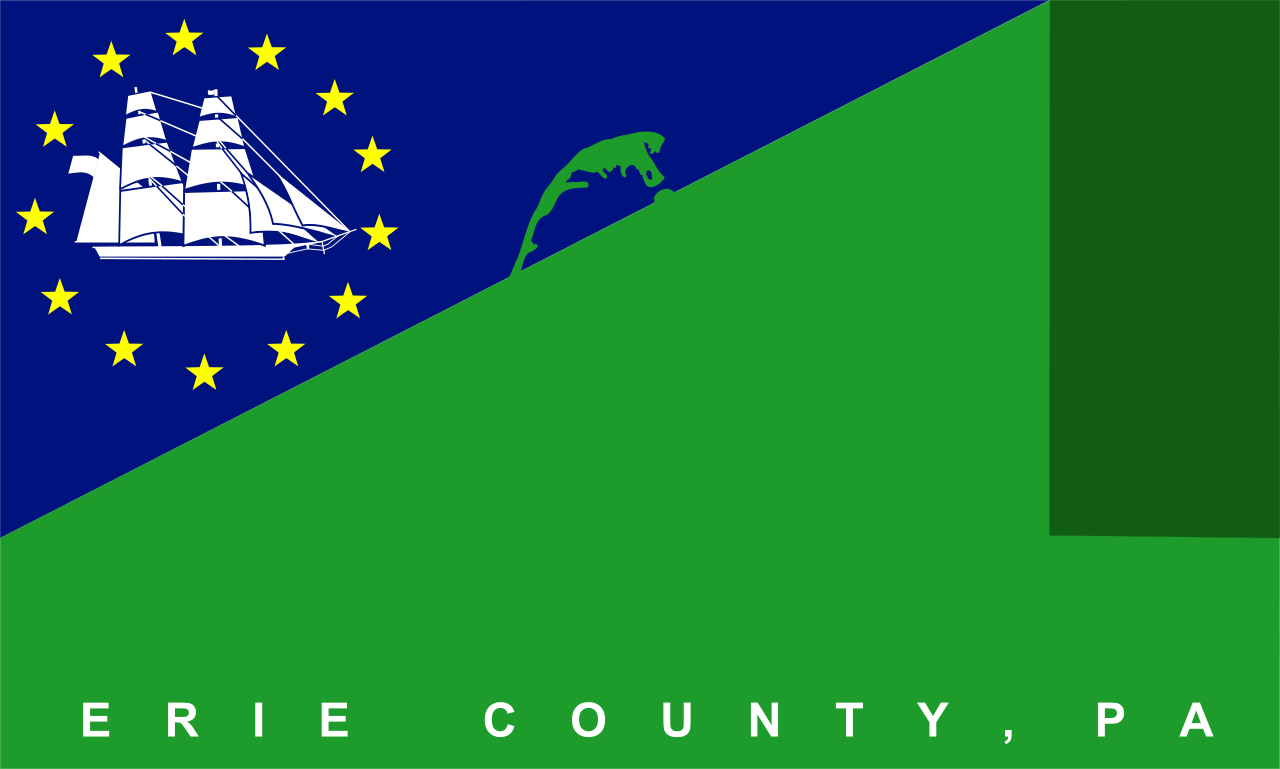
- November 5, 2013
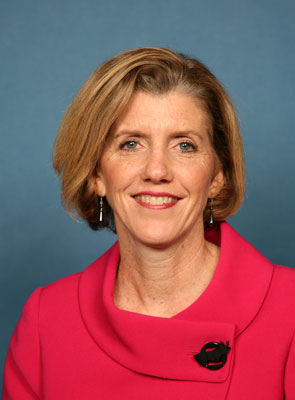

Nominee	Kathy Dahlkemper	Don Tucci
Party	Democratic	Republican
Popular vote	31,391	23,436
Percentage	57.25%	42.75%
County Executive before election
Barry Grossman
Democratic
Elected County Executive
Kathy Dahlkemper
Democratic

The 2013 Erie County Executive election was held on November 5, 2013. Incumbent Democratic County Executive Barry Grossman, who was first elected in 2009, ran for re-election to a second term. However, he was narrowly defeated in the Democratic primary by former Congresswoman Kathy Dahlkemper, losing renomination 52–48 percent. In the general election, she faced the Republican nominee, businessman and Tea Party activist Don Tucci. Dahlkemper defeated Tucci by a wide margin, winning her first term as County Executive, 57–43 percent.

== Democratic primary ==
=== Candidates ===
- Kathy Dahlkemper, former U.S. Representative
- Barry Grossman, incumbent County Executive

=== Results ===
Democratic primary results
Party	Candidate	Votes	%
Democratic	Kathy Dahlkemper	13,319	52.33%
Democratic	Barry Grossman (inc.)	12,133	47.67%
Total votes		25,452	100.00%

== Republican primary ==
=== Candidates ===
- Don Tucci, businessman and Tea Party activist
- Tom Loftus, Lawrence Park Township Commissioner
- Tom McGahen

=== Results ===
Republican primary results
Party	Candidate	Votes	%
Republican	Don Tucci	5,011	41.87%
Republican	Tom Loftus	4,494	37.55%
Republican	Tom McGahen	2,464	20.59%
Total votes		11,969	100.00%

== General election ==
=== Results ===
2013 Erie County Executive election
Party	Candidate	Votes	%
Democratic	Kathy Dahlkemper	31,391	57.25%
Republican	Don Tucci	23,436	42.75%
Total votes		54,827	100.00%
Democratic hold			
