= 2025 Lehigh County elections =

2025 Pennsylvania local election

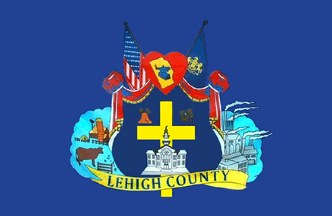
- November 4, 2025

A general election was held in Lehigh County, Pennsylvania on November 4, 2025, to elect various county-level positions. Primary elections were held on May 20, 2025.

== County Commission ==
=== District 1 ===
==== Republican primary ====
===== Candidates =====
====== Nominee ======
- Antonio Pineda, incumbent commissioner

===== Results =====
Republican primary
Party	Candidate	Votes	%
Republican	Antonio Pineda (incumbent)	3,525	99.05
Republican	Scattering	34	0.95
Total votes		3,559	100.00

==== Democratic primary ====
===== Results =====
Democratic primary
Party	Candidate	Votes	%
Democratic	Antonio Pineda (incumbent, write-in)	294	49.83
Democratic	Scattering	296	50.17
Total votes		590	100.00

==== General election ====
===== Results =====
2025 Lehigh County Council election, district 1
Party	Candidate	Votes	%
Democratic/Republican	Antonio Pineda (incumbent)	16,359	100.00
Write-in			
Total votes		16,359	100.00

=== District 2 ===
==== Republican primary ====
===== Results =====
Republican primary
Party	Candidate	Votes	%
Republican	Ron W Beitler (incumbent)	4,023	99.11
Republican	Scattering	36	0.89
Total votes		4,059	100.00

==== Democratic primary ====
===== Results =====
Democratic primary
Party	Candidate	Votes	%
Democratic	Ron Beitler (incumbent, write-in)	129	27.56
Democratic	Scattering	339	72.44
Total votes		468	100.00

==== General election ====
===== Results =====
2025 Lehigh County Council election, district 2
Party	Candidate	Votes	%
Democratic/Republican	Ron Beitler (incumbent)	21,408	100.00
Write-in			
Total votes		21,408	100.00

=== District 3 ===
==== Democratic primary ====
===== Results =====
Democratic primary
Party	Candidate	Votes	%
Democratic	Zachary Cole Borghi (incumbent)	4,054	99.48
Democratic	Scattering	21	0.52
Total votes		4,075	100.00

==== Republican primary ====
===== Results =====
Republican primary
Party	Candidate	Votes	%
Republican	Jacqueline Rivera	1,126	98.17
Republican	Scattering	21	1.83
Total votes		1,147	100.00

==== General election ====
===== Results =====
2025 Lehigh County Council election, district 3
Party	Candidate	Votes	%
Democratic	Zachary Cole Borghi (incumbent)	9,046	69.33
Republican	Jacqueline Rivera	4,002	30.67
Write-in			
Total votes		13,048	100.00

=== District 4 ===
==== Democratic primary ====
===== Results =====
Democratic primary
Party	Candidate	Votes	%
Democratic	Geoffrey Brace (incumbent)	4,397	99.59
Democratic	Scattering	18	0.41
Total votes		4,415	100.00

==== Republican primary ====
===== Results =====
Republican primary
Party	Candidate	Votes	%
Republican	Scattering	190	100.00
Total votes		190	100.00

==== General election ====
===== Results =====
2025 Lehigh County Council election, district 4
Party	Candidate	Votes	%
Democratic	Geoffrey Brace (incumbent)	11,144	100.00
Write-in			
Total votes		11,144	100.00

=== District 5 ===
==== Republican primary ====
===== Candidates =====
====== Nominee ======
- Patrick Leonard, former Upper Saucon Township supervisor

====== Declined ======
- Jeffrey Dutt, incumbent commissioner (resigned on March 30, 2025)

===== Results =====
Republican primary
Party	Candidate	Votes	%
Republican	Patrick M Leonard	2,714	98.48
Republican	Scattering	42	1.52
Total votes		2,756	100.00

==== Democratic primary ====
===== Candidates =====
====== Nominee ======
- Sarah Fevig, assistant vice provost in higher education

===== Results =====
Democratic primary
Party	Candidate	Votes	%
Democratic	Sarah Fevig	5,069	99.57
Democratic	Scattering	22	0.43
Total votes		5,091	100.00

==== General election ====
===== Results =====
2025 Lehigh County Council election, district 5
Party	Candidate	Votes	%
Democratic	Sarah Fevig	12,059	60.61
Republican	Patrick M Leonard	7,836	39.39
Write-in			
Total votes		19,895	100.00

== Court of Common Pleas partisan election ==
=== Democratic primary ===
==== Candidates ====
===== Nominee =====
- Mark Stanziola, attorney

===== Eliminated in primary =====
- Patricia Fuentes Mulqueen, prosecutor (cross-filing)
- Jenna Fliszar, attorney (cross-filing)

==== Results ====
Results by precinct Stanziola: 30–40%; 40–50%; 50–60%; 60–70%; 70–80%; 80–90%; Mulqueen: 30–40%; 40–50%; 50–60%; 60–70%; 70–80%; Tie: 30–40%; 40–50%

Democratic primary
Party	Candidate	Votes	%
Democratic	Mark B. Stanziola	11,584	51.81
Democratic	Patricia Fuentes Mulqueen	8,261	36.94
Democratic	Jenna M. Fliszar	3,888	17.39
Democratic	Scattering	32	0.14
Total votes		23,765	100.00

=== Republican primary ===
==== Candidates ====
===== Nominee =====
- Patricia Fuentes Mulqueen, prosecutor (cross-filing)

===== Eliminated in primary =====
- Jenna Fliszar, attorney (cross-filing)

==== Results ====
Results by precinct Mulqueen: 50–60%; 60–70%; 70–80%; 80–90%; >90%; Fliszar: 50–60%; 60–70%; Tie: 50%

Republican primary
Party	Candidate	Votes	%
Republican	Patricia Fuentes Mulqueen	9,106	61.44
Republican	Jenna M. Fliszar	5,630	37.98
Republican	Scattering	81	0.55
Total votes		14,817	100.00

==== General election ====
===== Results =====
Results by precinct Stanziola: 50–60%; 60–70%; 70–80%; 80–90%; Mulqueen: 50–60%; 60–70%

2025 Lehigh County Court of Common Pleas election
Party	Candidate	Votes	%
Democratic	Mark B. Stanziola	55,142	59.07
Republican	Patricia Fuentes Mulqueen	38,216	40.93
Total votes		93,358	100.00
