= Amir Omar =

American politician

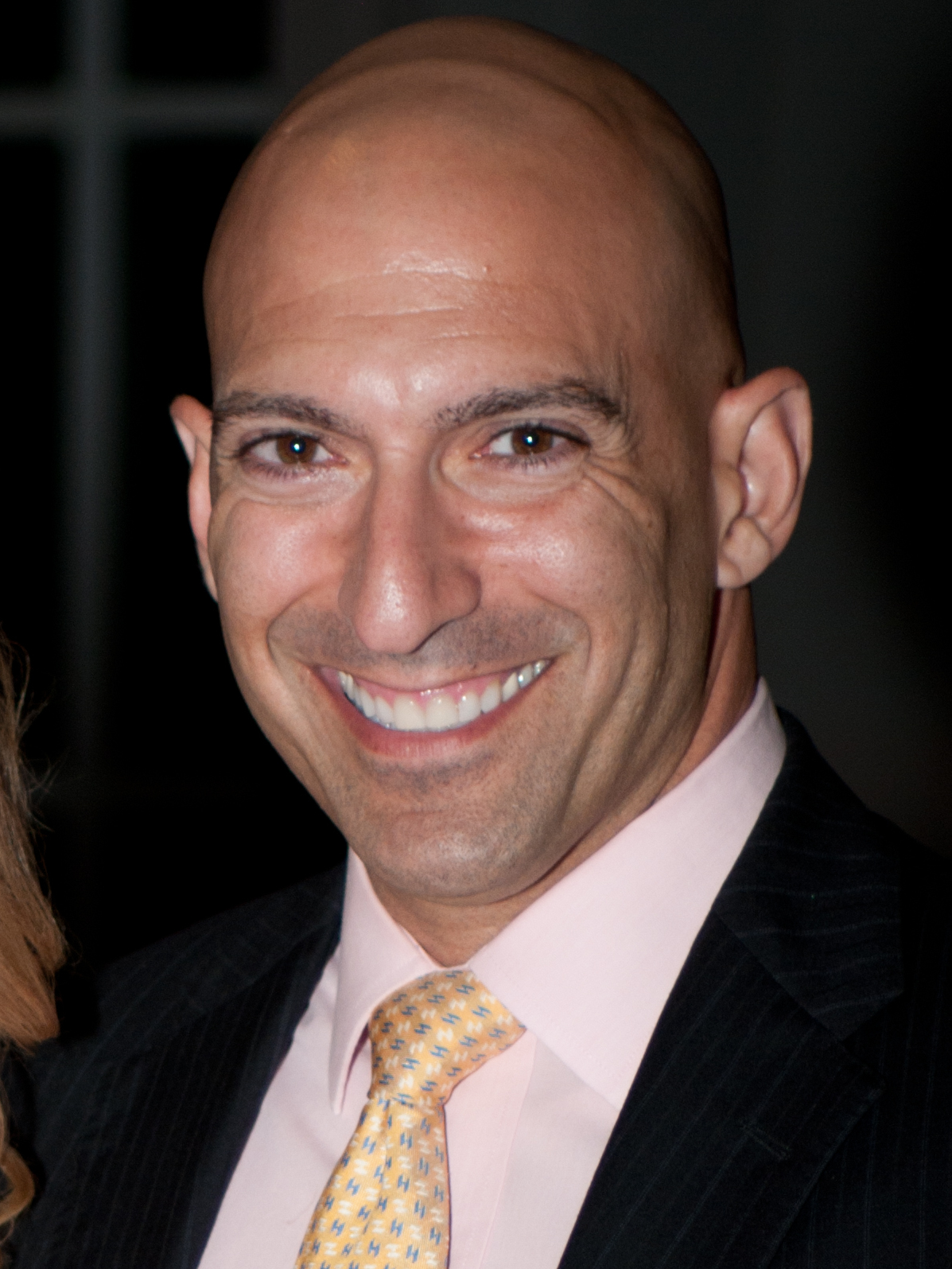
- Omar in 2012

Mayor of Richardson, Texas
- Incumbent
- Assumed office May 13, 2025
- Preceded by: Bob Dubey

Personal details
- Born: 1972 (age 52-53) Milwaukee, Wisconsin, U.S.
- Party: Democratic
- Education: Texas A&M University (BS)
- Website: Amir Omar

Amir Omar (born 1972) is an American politician serving as the mayor of Richardson, Texas. Omar is believed to be the first Muslim elected to political office in North Texas. Omar was elected to the Richardson City Council in May 2009, defeating incumbent Dennis Stewart by 51.54% to 48.46%. On May 3, 2025, Omar defeated incumbent Bob Dubey 54.4% to 41.6% in the mayoral race.

In addition, American-Iranian groups believe that Omar is the first Iranian-American to be elected to a municipal office in Texas.

== Early life and education ==
Born in Milwaukee, Wisconsin, Omar was raised in South Texas in the Harlingen area. He attended Texas A&M University and joined the university's Corps of Cadets. He operated a laundry business while in school and graduated with a Bachelor of Science degree in industrial distribution in 1996.

Omar is the son of a Palestinian father and Iranian mother. One of his parents is Sunni and the other Shi'ite. His mother was an upper-middle class Iranian, his father a Palestinian villager of modest means.

== Career ==
In 2006, Omar ran for the Texas's 30th congressional district as a Republican. During the campaign, he received the endorsement of the Dallas Morning News.

Having moved to Richardson so that his son could attend a school in the area, Omar began attending city council meetings and eventually decided to run for place seven on the Richardson City Council.

=== 2009 city council election ===
Place seven of the Richardson City Council is one of three "at-large" positions. All voters vote for all seven council places, but places one through four have residency requirements while officeholders in places five, six, and seven can live anywhere in the city.

In 2007, Dennis Stewart, a Richardson police officer who retired as a lieutenant in 2004, ran against incumbent John Sweeden in place seven and pulled off an upset, defeating Sweeden by 50.84% to 49.16%. Stewart was part of the group of "new" Council members who elected Steve Mitchell as mayor in 2007, ending 16 years of Gary Slagel serving as mayor.

A group of Richardson residents, upset that Slagel had not been re-elected as mayor, founded a political action group called the Richardson Coalition. This group raised money to promote its agenda, emphasizing what it believed was right with the City. The group made no direct contributions to candidates, but published and mailed a controversial color voter's guide in which they endorsed a slate of candidates. The coalition endorsed candidates opposing each of the Council members that ended Slagel's tenure as mayor in 2007.

The fact that Omar is Muslim was a strong background issue. However, incumbent Dennis Stewart did not make an issue of Omar's religion in public and in fact referred to the nights that he as a Richardson police officer spent outside the mosque in the southeast Richardson after September 11, 2001, to ensure that there was no backlash against Muslims in Richardson because of the terror attacks.

According to the Dallas Morning News, Omar outspent and outworked incumbent Stewart, winning by 220 votes, 51.54% to 48.46%.

=== 2011 city council election ===
Prior to the 2011 City Council election, a local citizen group called the "Richardson Citizens Alliance" arose to combat the Richardson Coalition and to "oust" incumbents. This group originally tried to run a serious candidate against Omar, but switched that candidate to another place and persuaded neighborhood leader Diana Clawson to run against Omar.

Known mostly in her local neighborhood on the east side of Richardson, Ms. Clawson received less than a third of the vote against Omar, who won with 63% of the vote in a field of three (a third candidate, Alan North, did no campaigning at all yet still received over 4% of the vote).

=== 2013 city council election ===
On November 14, 2012, just days after Richardson voters approved a change in the city charter to elect the mayor directly, Omar announced his intention to run for mayor. Unlike other council members, Omar was forced to make a decision, because Place 7, the place that he held since 2009, was being converted to the mayor's place by the charter change approved by Richardson voters on November 6, 2012. Rather than run for a different place, Omar decided to run for his current place, but this time as mayor.

On May 11, 2013, Omar lost the race for place seven (mayor) to fellow Councilmember Laura Maczka by a 10,167 to 4,172 vote (70.90% to 29.10%).

=== Council assignments ===
Omar is the council liaison to the Environmental Advisory Commission.

Omar is the council liaison to the Retail Committee.

Omar is on the Methodist Richardson Medical Center Foundation board.

=== Accomplishments ===
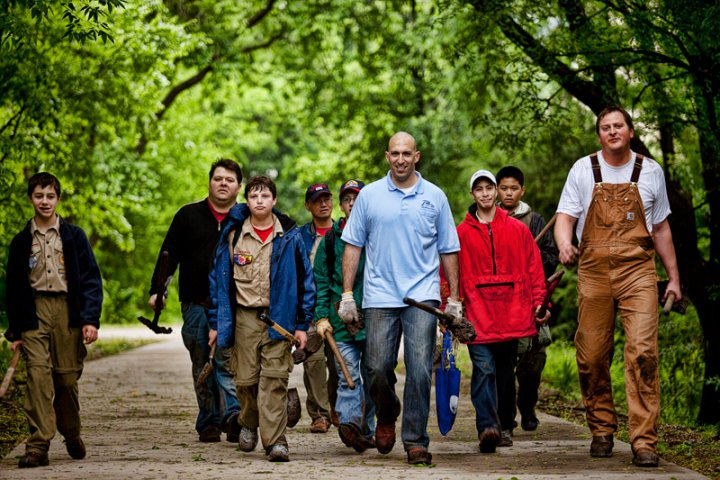
Richardson City Council member Amir Omar (in blue shirt) walking with Boy Scouts and other volunteers at a "Tree The Town" event.

As the council liaison to the Environmental Advisory Commission, in 2010, Omar championed the "Tree The Town" initiative, a program in which upwards of 50,000 trees would be planted in Richardson over the next ten years.
