= 2025 Allegheny County elections =

2025 Pennsylvania local election

- November 4, 2025

A general election was held in Allegheny County, Pennsylvania on November 4, 2025, to elect various county-level positions. The primary election was held on May 20, 2025.

== Sheriff ==
=== Democratic primary ===
==== Candidates ====
===== Nominee =====
- Kevin M. Kraus, incumbent sheriff

==== Results ====
Democratic primary
Party	Candidate	Votes	%
Democratic	Kevin M. Kraus (incumbent)	138,632	98.96
Write-in		1,452	1.04
Total votes		140,084	100.00

=== Republican primary ===
==== Candidates ====
===== Nominee =====
- Brian Weismantle, retired detective

==== Results ====
Republican primary
Party	Candidate	Votes	%
Republican	Brian Weismantle	40,224	96.92
Write-in		1,279	3.08
Total votes		41,503	100.00

=== General election ===
==== Results ====
Results by precinct Kraus: 50–60%; 60–70%; 70–80%; 80–90%; >90%; Weismantle: 40–50%; 50–60%; 60–70%; Tie: 50%

2025 Allegheny County Sheriff election
Party	Candidate	Votes	%
Democratic	Kevin M. Kraus (incumbent)	283,247	72.15
Republican	Brian Weismantle	108,756	27.70
Write-in		602	0.15
Total votes		392,605	100.00

== Court of Common Pleas partisan elections ==
Eight seats on the Allegheny County Court of Common Pleas are up for partisan election, to either fill vacant seats or elect previously appointed judges. If a candidate wins the nomination of both primaries, they are listed on the ballot under both labels, and the vote totals are combined in final reporting.

=== Democratic primary ===
==== Candidates ====
===== Nominees =====
- Quita Bridges, incumbent judge
- Julie Capone, trial attorney (cross-filing)
- Anthony DeLuca, Magisterial District Judge
- Amanda Green-Hawkins, lawyer
- Jaime Marie Hickton, attorney
- Dan Miller, state representative from the 42nd district (cross-filing)
- Matthew V. Rudzki, Magisterial District Judge
- Heather Schmidt Bresnahan, attorney

===== Eliminated in primary =====
- Alyssa Cowan, incumbent judge (cross-filing)
- Elizabeth Hughes, law practitioner
- Lauren Leiggi, public defender
- Amy Mathieu, lawyer
- Bryan Neft, law practitioner
- Jackie Obara, divorce hearing officer (cross-filing)
- Carmen L. Robinson
- Michele Santicola, Magisterial District Judge (cross-filing)
- Craig Stephens, Magisterial District Judge
- Mike Sullivan, attorney
- Sarra Terry, special counsel (cross-filing)
- Dennis Very, practicing attorney
- Hilary K. Wheatley, Magisterial District Judge
- Ilan Zur, attorney

==== Results ====
Democratic primary (vote for up to 8)
Party	Candidate	Votes	%
Democratic	Amanda Green-Hawkins	93,346	8.99
Democratic	Dan Miller	80,431	7.75
Democratic	Quita Bridges	80,283	7.73
Democratic	Julie Capone	77,742	7.49
Democratic	Anthony DeLuca	75,992	7.32
Democratic	Heather Schmidt Bresnahan	72,497	6.98
Democratic	Jaime Marie Hickton	63,866	6.15
Democratic	Matthew V. Rudzki	57,084	5.50
Democratic	Alyssa Cowan	54,993	5.30
Democratic	Lauren Leiggi	42,289	4.07
Democratic	Amy Mathieu	38,454	3.70
Democratic	Michele Santicola	33,281	3.21
Democratic	Carmen L. Robinson	31,237	3.01
Democratic	Sarra Terry	30,312	2.92
Democratic	Bryan Neft	28,502	2.75
Democratic	Ilan Zur	28,397	2.74
Democratic	Craig Stephens	27,562	2.65
Democratic	Hilary K. Wheatley	27,333	2.63
Democratic	Mike Sullivan	27,143	2.61
Democratic	Elizabeth Hughes	25,939	2.50
Democratic	Jackie Obara	25,070	2.41
Democratic	Dennis Very	15,017	1.45
Write-in		1,425	0.14
Total votes		1,038,195	100.00

=== Republican primary ===
==== Candidates ====
===== Nominees =====
- Julie Capone, (cross-filing)
- Alyssa Cowan, incumbent judge (cross-filing)
- Dan Miller, Democratic state representative from the 42nd district (cross-filing)
- Bryan Neft, (write-in, cross-filing)
- Jackie Obara, (cross-filing)
- Michele Santicola, (cross-filing)
- Sarra Terry, (cross-filing)

==== Results ====
Republican primary (vote for up to 8)
Party	Candidate	Votes	%
Republican	Julie Capone	32,524	16.65
Republican	Michele Santicola	31,282	16.02
Republican	Jackie Obara	29,788	15.25
Republican	Sarra Terry	27,481	14.07
Republican	Dan Miller	24,226	12.41
Republican	Alyssa Cowan	21,599	11.06
Write-in		28,390	14.54
Total votes		195,290	100.00

=== General election ===
==== Results ====
2025 Allegheny County Court of Common Pleas election (vote for up to 8)
Party	Candidate	Votes	%
Democratic	Amanda Green-Hawkins	253,184	10.52
Democratic	Heather Schmidt Bresnahan	243,460	10.12
Democratic	Quita Bridges	242,701	10.09
Democratic	Jaime Marie Hickton	240,057	9.98
Democratic	Matthew V. Rudzki	237,522	9.87
Democratic/Republican	Anthony DeLuca	221,835	9.22
Democratic/Republican	Julie Capone	218,825	9.10
Democratic/Republican	Dan Miller	217,391	9.04
Republican	Michele Santicola	120,552	5.01
Republican	Alyssa Cowan	107,535	4.47
Republican	Bryan Neft	101,996	4.24
Republican	Jackie Obara	101,091	4.20
Republican	Sarra Terry	95,993	3.99
Write-in		3,584	0.15
Total votes		2,405,726	100.00

== Court of Common Pleas retention elections ==
=== Results ===
Judge Edward J. Borkowski retention, 2025
Choice	Votes	%
For	256,505	71.97
Against	99,879	28.03
Total	356,384	100.00
Source: Allegheny County Board of Elections

Judge Alan Hertzberg retention, 2025
Choice	Votes	%
For	251,832	70.84
Against	103,658	29.16
Total	355,490	100.00
Source: Allegheny County Board of Elections

Judge Beth A. Lazzara retention, 2025
Choice	Votes	%
For	256,864	71.98
Against	99,990	28.02
Total	356,854	100.00
Source: Allegheny County Board of Elections

Judge Jennifer Staley McCrady retention, 2025
Choice	Votes	%
For	254,143	71.60
Against	100,797	28.40
Total	354,940	100.00
Source: Allegheny County Board of Elections

Judge Hugh Fitzpatrick McGough retention, 2025
Choice	Votes	%
For	250,991	70.77
Against	103,673	29.23
Total	354,664	100.00
Source: Allegheny County Board of Elections

Judge Dan Regan retention, 2025
Choice	Votes	%
For	253,294	71.63
Against	100,319	28.37
Total	353,613	100.00
Source: Allegheny County Board of Elections

Judge Dwayne D. Woodruff retention, 2025
Choice	Votes	%
For	272,083	74.81
Against	91,600	25.19
Total	363,683	100.00
Source: Allegheny County Board of Elections
