= 2025 Kansas City, Kansas mayoral election =

Local election in Kansas, US

- November 4, 2025
Nominee	Christal; Watson	Rose Mulvany Henry
Party	Nonpartisan	Nonpartisan
Popular vote	9,465	8,050
Percentage	54.04%	45.96%
Mayor before election
Tyrone Garner
Nonpartisan
Elected mayor
Christal Watson
Nonpartisan

The 2025 Kansas City, Kansas mayoral election was held on November 4, 2025 to elect the mayor of Kansas City, Kansas. A nonpartisan primary took place on August 5, 2025. Incumbent mayor Tyrone Garner did not seek re-election to a second term. Six candidates ran to succeed him. Rose Mulvany Henry and Christal Watson advanced to the general election after receiving the most votes in the primary election. Watson went on to defeat Henry in the general election, becoming the first woman to be elected mayor of Kansas City, Kansas.

== Primary election ==
=== Candidates ===
==== Advanced to general ====
- Rose Mulvany Henry, member of the Kansas City Board of Public Utilities
- Christal Watson, former Kansas City, Kansas School Board member

==== Eliminated in primary ====
- Tom Burroughs, county commissioner and former Democratic state representative
- Mark Gilstrap, Kansas City Kansas Community College trustee and former Republican state senator
- Gwendolyn S. Thomas, former county government employee
- Janice Witt, nonprofit executive and perennial candidate

==== Declined ====
- Tyrone Garner, incumbent mayor

=== Results ===
Primary election results
Party	Candidate	Votes	%
Nonpartisan	Rose Mulvany Henry	3,619	31.25%
Nonpartisan	Christal Watson	3,031	26.18%
Nonpartisan	Tom Burroughs	2,910	25.13%
Nonpartisan	Mark Gilstrap	833	7.19%
Nonpartisan	Gwendolyn S. Thomas	691	5.97%
Nonpartisan	Janice Witt	495	4.27%
Total votes		11,579	100.00%

== General election ==
=== Results ===
2025 Kansas City mayoral election
Party	Candidate	Votes	%
Nonpartisan	Christal Watson	9,465	54.04%
Nonpartisan	Rose Mulvany Henry	8,050	45.96%
Total votes		17,515	100.00%
