= 2025 Delaware County, Pennsylvania elections =

2025 Pennsylvania local election

- November 4, 2025

A general election was held in Delaware County, Pennsylvania on November 4, 2025, to elect various county-level positions. The primary election were held on May 20, 2025.

== Sheriff ==
=== Democratic primary ===
==== Candidates ====
===== Nominee =====
- Siddiq Kamara, Lansdowne former Agent for the PA Attorney General's Office

==== Results ====
Democratic primary
Party	Candidate	Votes	%
Democratic	Siddiq Kamara	38,210	99.56
Write-in		168	0.44
Total votes		38,378	100.00

=== Republican primary ===
==== Candidates ====
===== Nominee =====
- Robert Adams, captain of the Delaware County Sheriff's Office

==== Results ====
Republican primary
Party	Candidate	Votes	%
Republican	Robert Adams	22,169	99.04
Write-in		214	0.96
Total votes		22,383	100.00

=== General election ===
==== Endorsements ====
Siddiq Kamara (D)

Party chapters

- Delaware County Democratic Party
- Upper Darby Democratic Committee

Organizations

- International Union of Painters and Allied Trades DC 21

==== Results ====
Results by precinct Kamara: 50–60%; 60–70%; 70–80%; 80–90%; >90%; Adams: 50–60%; 60–70%

2025 Delaware County Sheriff election
Party	Candidate	Votes	%
Democratic	Siddiq Kamara	115,317	62.95
Republican	Robert Adams	67,733	36.97
Write-in		143	0.08
Total votes		183,193	100.00

== County Controller ==
=== Democratic primary ===
==== Candidates ====
===== Nominee =====
- Louis F. Rosenthal, banker

==== Results ====
Democratic primary
Party	Candidate	Votes	%
Democratic	Louis F. Rosenthal	37,636	99.64
Write-in		136	0.36
Total votes		37,772	100.00

=== Republican primary ===
==== Candidates ====
===== Nominee =====
- Tommy Feldman, tax accountant and real estate agent

==== Results ====
Republican primary
Party	Candidate	Votes	%
Republican	Tommy Feldman	21,714	98.96
Write-in		228	1.04
Total votes		21,942	100.00

=== General election ===
==== Endorsements ====
Louis F. Rosenthal (D)

Organizations

- International Union of Painters and Allied Trades DC 21
Tommy Feldman (R)

Party chapters

- Delaware County Republican Party
- Pennsylvania Forward Party

==== Results ====
Results by precinct Rosenthal: 50–60%; 60–70%; 70–80%; 80–90%; >90%; Feldman: 50–60%; 60–70%

2025 Delaware County Controller election
Party	Candidate	Votes	%
Democratic	Louis F. Rosenthal	117,990	64.88
Republican	Tommy Feldman	63,752	35.06
Write-in		104	0.06
Total votes		181,846	100.00

== Register of Wills ==
=== Democratic primary ===
==== Candidates ====
===== Nominee =====
- Vincent Rongione, incumbent register of wills

==== Results ====
Democratic primary
Party	Candidate	Votes	%
Democratic	Vincent Rongione (incumbent)	37,927	99.63
Write-in		140	0.37
Total votes		38,067	100.00

=== Republican primary ===
==== Candidates ====
===== Nominee =====
- Meaghan Wagner, Upper Darby Township councilor

==== Results ====
Republican primary
Party	Candidate	Votes	%
Republican	Meaghan Wagner	21,909	99.09
Write-in		201	0.91
Total votes		22,110	100.00

=== General election ===
==== Endorsements ====
Vincent Rongione (D)

Organizations

- International Union of Painters and Allied Trades DC 21

==== Results ====
Results by precinct Rongione: 50–60%; 60–70%; 70–80%; 80–90%; >90%; Wagner: 50–60%; 60–70%

2025 Delaware County Register of Wills election
Party	Candidate	Votes	%
Democratic	Vincent Rongione (incumbent)	117,479	64.47
Republican	Meaghan Wagner	64,547	35.42
Write-in		198	0.11
Total votes		182,224	100.00

== County Council ==
=== Democratic primary ===
==== Candidates ====
===== Nominees =====
- Joanne Phillips, incumbent councilor
- Richard Womack, incumbent councilor

==== Results ====
Democratic primary (vote for up to 2)
Party	Candidate	Votes	%
Democratic	Joanne Phillips (incumbent)	35,542	49.82
Democratic	Richard Womack (incumbent)	35,405	49.63
Write-in		390	0.55
Total votes		71,337	100.00

=== Republican primary ===
==== Candidates ====
===== Nominees =====
- Brian Burke, Upper Darby Township councilor
- Liz Piazza, former county employee

===== Did not qualify =====
- Charles Alexander

===== Withdrawn =====
- Tasilym Morales

==== Results ====
Republican primary (vote for up to 2)
Party	Candidate	Votes	%
Republican	Liz Piazza	19,282	48.25
Republican	Brian Burke	19,014	47.58
Write-in		1,664	4.17
Total votes		39,960	100.00

=== General election ===
==== Endorsements ====
Joanne Phillips (D)

Organizations

- International Union of Painters and Allied Trades DC 21
Richard Womack (D)

Organizations

- International Union of Painters and Allied Trades DC 21

==== Results ====
2025 Delaware County Council election
Party	Candidate	Votes	%
Democratic	Joanne Phillips (incumbent)	117,403	33.96
Democratic	Richard Womack (incumbent)	108,328	31.34
Republican	Liz Piazza	59,916	17.33
Republican	Brian Burke	59,510	17.22
Write-in		518	0.15
Total votes		345,675	100.00

== Court of Common Pleas partisan election ==
=== Democratic primary ===
==== Candidates ====
===== Nominees =====
- Mike Power
- Jack Stollsteimer, Delaware County district attorney

==== Results ====
Democratic primary (vote for up to 2)
Party	Candidate	Votes	%
Democratic	Jack Stollsteimer	36,767	52.76
Democratic	Mike Power	32,652	46.86
Write-in		262	0.38
Total votes		69,681	100.00

=== Republican primary ===
==== Candidates ====
===== Nominees =====
- Dominick Spigarelli
- Frank Zarrillli

==== Results ====
Republican primary (vote for up to 2)
Party	Candidate	Votes	%
Republican	Dominick Spigarelli	19,948	50.17
Republican	Frank Zarrilli	19,478	49.00
Write-in		329	0.83
Total votes		39,755	100.00

=== General election ===
==== Endorsements ====
Jack Stollsteimer (D)

Organizations

- International Union of Painters and Allied Trades DC 21
Mike Power (D)

Organizations

- International Union of Painters and Allied Trades DC 21

==== Results ====
2025 Delaware County Court of Common Pleas election (vote for up to 2)
Party	Candidate	Votes	%
Democratic	Jack Stollsteimer	119,488	35.06
Democratic	Mike Power	107,081	31.42
Republican	Dominick Spigarelli	57,865	16.98
Republican	Frank Zarrilli	56,150	16.48
Write-in		220	0.06
Total votes		340,804	100.00

== Court of Common Pleas retention elections ==
=== Results ===
Justice Margaret J. Amoroso retention, 2025
Choice	Votes	%
For	131,006	76.24
Against	40,830	23.76
Total	171,836	100.00
Source: Delaware County Board of Elections

Justice Dominic F. Pileggi retention, 2025
Choice	Votes	%
For	130,254	75.28
Against	42,762	24.72
Total	173,016	100.00
Source: Delaware County Board of Elections

Justice Anthony D. Scanlon retention, 2025
Choice	Votes	%
For	134,258	77.86
Against	38,183	22.14
Total	172,441	100.00
Source: Delaware County Board of Elections
