= 2025 Hudson County Sheriff election =

New Jersey local election

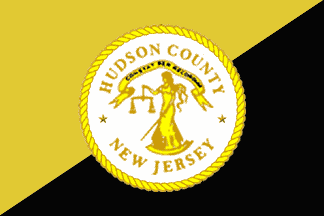
- November 4, 2025
Candidate	Jimmy Davis	Elvis Alvarez
Party	Democratic	Republican
Popular vote	108,009	35,860
Percentage	71.9%	23.9%
Sheriff before election
Frank Schillari
Republican
Elected Sheriff
Jimmy Davis
Democratic

The 2025 Hudson County Sheriff election was held on November 4, 2025, to elect the sheriff of Hudson County, New Jersey. The primary election was held on June 10, 2025. Incumbent sheriff Frank Schillari ran for re-election but lost the Democratic nomination to Jimmy Davis. After losing the nomination, Schillari joined the Republican Party. Davis won the general election with 72% of the vote.

== Democratic primary ==
=== Candidates ===
==== Nominee ====
- Jimmy Davis, mayor of Bayonne

==== Eliminated in primary ====
- Frank Schillari, incumbent sheriff

=== Endorsements ===
Jimmy Davis

Statewide officials

- Phil Murphy, Governor of New Jersey (2018–present)

Political parties

- Hudson County Democratic Organization

=== Campaign ===
The Democratic primary for sheriff was highlighted by the Hudson County Democratic Organization endorsing Jimmy Davis over four-term incumbent Schillari. Schillari's campaign had used a sexual harassment lawsuit against Davis from 2018 as a focus point of their campaign, though Schillari had been unaware of what his campaign was actually sending out.

=== Results ===
Democratic primary
Party	Candidate	Votes	%
Democratic	James M. Davis	35,080	53.02
Democratic	Frank X. Schillari (incumbent)	30,611	46.26
Write-in		474	0.72
Total votes		66,165	100.00

== Republican primary ==
=== Candidates ===
==== Nominee ====
- Elvis Alvarez, police officer

=== Results ===
Republican primary
Party	Candidate	Votes	%
Republican	Elvis Alvarez	7,684	95.54
Write-in		359	4.46
Total votes		8,043	100.00

== Independent and third-party candidates ==
=== Independents ===
==== Declared ====
- Justin Avishay, construction company manager

== General election ==
=== Results ===
2025 Hudson County Sheriff election
Party	Candidate	Votes	%
Democratic	Jimmy Davis	108,009	71.90
Republican	Elvis Alvarez	35,860	23.87
Independent	Justin Avishay	5,809	3.87
Write-in		539	0.36
Total votes		150,217	100.00
