= 2025 Winnebago County, Wisconsin Executive election =

- April 1, 2025
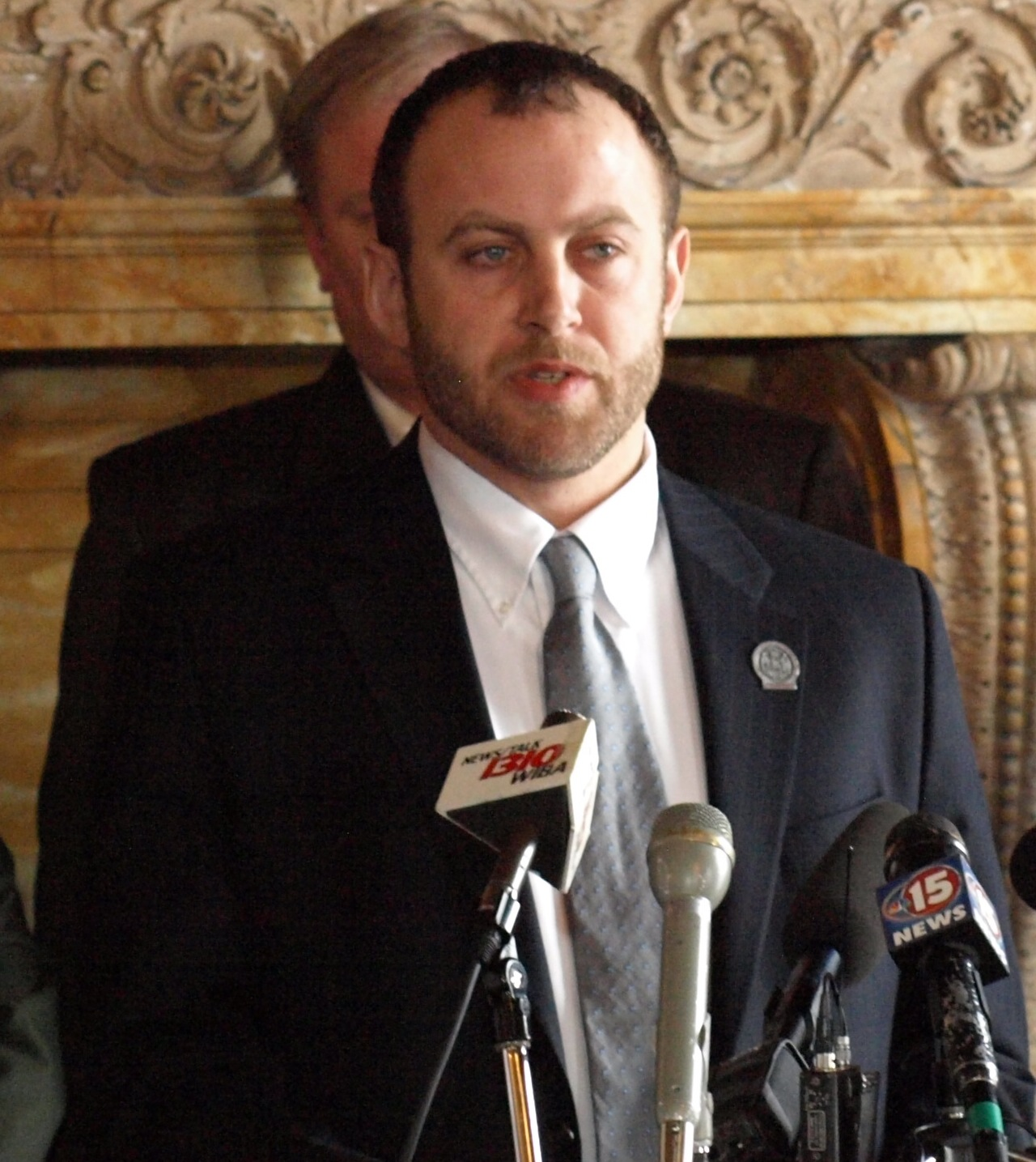

| Nominee | Gordon Hintz | Jon Doemel |
| Popular vote | 30,832 | 27,374 |
| Percentage | 52.78% | 46.86% |
- Hintz: 40–50% 50–60% 60–70% 90–100% Doemel: 40–50% 50–60% 60–70% 70–80% No votes
County Executive before election
Jon Doemel
Nonpartisan
Elected County Executive
Gordon Hintz
Nonpartisan

The 2025 Winnebago County, Wisconsin Executive election took place on April 1, 2025, following a primary election on February 18, 2025. Incumbent County Executive Jon Doemel ran for re-election to a second term. He was challenged by two opponents: former State Representative Gordon Hintz and County Sheriff John Matz. Hintz placed first in the primary election by a wide margin, winning 50 percent of the vote, while Doemel placed second with 27 percent and advanced to the general election.

In the general election, Hintz narrowly defeated Doemel, winning 53 percent of the vote to Dremel's 47 percent.

== Primary election ==
=== Candidates ===
- Gordon Hintz, former State Representative, former Minority Leader of the Wisconsin Assembly
- Jon Doemel, incumbent County Executive
- John Matz, County Sheriff

=== Results ===
Primary election
| Party | Candidate | Votes | % |
|---|---|---|---|
| Nonpartisan | Gordon Hintz | 7,127 | 49.67% |
| Nonpartisan | Jon Doemel (inc.) | 3,912 | 27.26% |
| Nonpartisan | John Matz | 3,281 | 22.87% |
| Write-in | | 29 | 0.29% |
| Total votes | | 24,267 | 100.00% |

== General election ==
=== Endorsements ===
Jon Doemel

Organizations

- Wisconsin Young Republicans
Gordon Hintz

Organizations

- Planned Parenthood Action Fund
- Wisconsin State AFL-CIO

=== Results ===
2025 Winnebago County Executive election
| Party | Candidate | Votes | % |
|---|---|---|---|
| Nonpartisan | Gordon Hintz | 30,832 | 52.78% |
| Nonpartisan | Jon Doemel (inc.) | 27,374 | 46.86% |
| Write-in | | 211 | 0.36% |
| Total votes | | 58,417 | 100.00% |
