= 2025 Northampton County Executive election =

- November 4, 2025

Nominee	Tara Zrinski	Tom Giovanni
Party	Democratic	Republican
Popular vote	53,129	36,129
Percentage	59.49%	40.45%
- Precinct results Zrinski: 50–60% 60–70% 70–80% 80–90% >90% Giovanni: 50–60% 60–70%
County Executive before election
Lamont McClure
Democratic
Elected County Executive
Tara Zrinski
Democratic

The 2025 Northampton County Executive election was held on November 4, 2025. Incumbent Democratic County Executive Lamont McClure originally announced that he would seek a third term, but ultimately declined to do so, instead opting to run for Congress. In the Democratic primary, County Controller Tara Zrinski defeated former County Registrar Amy Cozze with 57 percent of the vote, and advanced to the general election, where she faced County Councilman Tom Giovanni, the Republican nominee.

== Democratic primary ==
=== Candidates ===
- Tara Zrinski, County Controller
- Amy Cozze, County Registrar, former Director of State Outreach for U.S. Senator Bob Casey Jr.

=== Results ===
Results by precinct Zrinski: 50–60%; 60–70%; 70–80%; Cozze: 50–60%; 60–70%; 70–80%; Tie: 40–50%; 50%

Democratic primary results
Party	Candidate	Votes	%
Democratic	Tara Zrinski	13,584	56.84%
Democratic	Amy Cozze	10,298	43.09%
Democratic	Write-ins	17	0.07%
Total votes		23,899	100.00%

== Republican primary ==
=== Candidates ===
- Tom Giovanni, County Councilman

=== Results ===
Republican primary results
Party	Candidate	Votes	%
Republican	Tom Giovanni	12,224	99.50%
Republican	Write-ins	61	0.50%
Total votes		12,285	100.00%

== General election ==
=== Candidates ===
- Tara Zrinski, County Controller (Democratic)
- Tom Giovanni, County Councilman (Republican)

=== Results ===
2025 Northampton County Executive election
Party	Candidate	Votes	%
Democratic	Tara Zrinski	52,687	59.38%
Republican	Tom Giovanni	35,993	40.56%
Write-in		54	0.06%
Total votes		88,734	100.00%
Democratic hold			
