= 2025 Rensselaer County Executive election =

- November 4, 2025
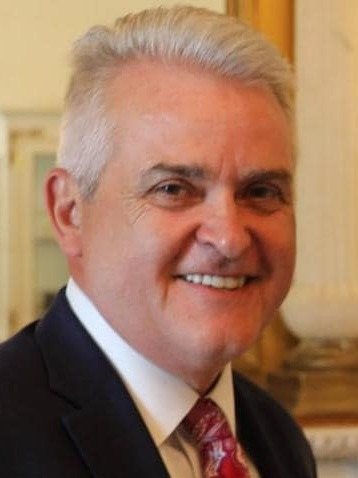

Candidate	Steve McLaughlin	Tiffani Silverman
Party	Republican	Democratic
Alliance	Conservative	Working Families
Popular vote	21,612	18,422
Percentage	53.93%	45.97%
County executive before election
Steve McLaughlin
Republican
Elected County executive
Steve McLaughlin
Republican

The 2025 Rensselaer County Executive election was held on November 4, 2025, to elect the county executive of Rensselaer County, New York. Incumbent Republican executive Steve McLaughlin won re-election to a third term.

== Political Background ==
Rensselaer County typically leans Democratic and voted for Kamala Harris in the 2024 presidential election by 1.4%.

== Republican primary ==
=== Candidates ===
==== Nominee ====
- Steve McLaughlin, incumbent county executive

== Democratic primary ==
=== Candidates ===
==== Nominee ====
- Tiffani Silverman, human resources advisor

=== Endorsements ===
Tiffani Silverman

Party chapters

- Rensselaer County Democratic Party
- City of Troy Democratic Committee

== General election ==
=== Results ===
2025 Rensselaer County Executive election
Party	Candidate	Votes	%
Republican	Steve McLaughlin (incumbent)		
Conservative	Steve McLaughlin (incumbent)		
Total	Steve McLaughlin (incumbent)		
Democratic	Tiffani Silverman		
Working Families	Tiffani Silverman		
Common Cents Party	Tiffani Silverman		
Total	Tiffani Silverman		
Write-in			
Total votes			100.00
