= 2025 Bloomington, Minnesota municipal election =

- November 4, 2025

The 2025 Bloomington, Minnesota municipal election was held on November 4, 2025. Three city council seats were up for election, in addition to four school board seats. In the city council race, which was conducted via ranked-choice voting, voters ranked up to three candidates per office by preference. In the school board election, voters were able to choose up to four candidates, with the four candidates with the most votes being elected. All offices elected were non-partisan. The candidate filing period lasted from July 29 to August 12, 2025. Early voting began on September 19, 2025.

Housing affordability, rising property taxes, and municipal spending were expected to be key topics influencing the election. Two city council incumbents retained their seats, while the open at-large position was filled, retaining a progressive majority on the council. Of the four school board seats up for election, three incumbents were re-elected and one newcomer filled the seat of a retiring incumbent.

== City Council ==
Three seats on the Bloomington City Council will be up for election for four year terms: one at-large seat, and the seats of Districts I and II.

=== At-large ===
This seat is one of two at-large positions on the Bloomington City Council and has been held by Chao Moua since his appointment February 2023 filling a vacancy. He was elected in the November election of that year, winning in the second round of ranked-choice tabulation, receiving 41.88% of first-choice votes and 54.56% of final votes. Moua is not seeking re-election.

==== Candidates ====
===== Filed =====
- Jonathan Minks, business owner and chair of the Bloomington Parks, Arts, and Recreation Commission
- Danielle Robertson, lawyer and stay-at-home parent
- Isaak Rooble, small business owner

===== Declined =====
- Chao Moua, incumbent councilmember (2023–present)

==== Endorsements ====
Danielle Robertson

Labor unions

- AFSCME Council 5
- Minneapolis Regional Labor Federation
- North Star Chapter Sierra Club
- Women Winning

Party chapters

- Senate District 50 DFL (Note: Letter of support; multiple can be issued for the same office.)
- Senate District 51 DFL

==== Results ====
Results by precinct: Robertson: 40%–50%; 50%–60%; 60%–70%; Minks: 40%–50%; 50%–60%; Tie

At-large results
Candidate	Round 1	
Candidate	Votes	%
Danielle Robertson	8,628	53.37
Jonathan Minks	6,180	38.23
Isaak Rooble	1,325	8.20
Write-ins	33	0.20
Total active votes	16,166	100.00
Source: Bloomington City Clerk's Office

=== District I ===
District I covers the southeast quadrant of Bloomington and has been represented by Dwayne Lowman since 2014. Lowman is seeking re-election. Lowman was re-elected in the first round of tabulation with 50.38% of the vote in 2023.

==== Candidates ====
===== Filed =====
- Dwayne Lowman, incumbent councilmember (District I)
- Jessica Keehan, teacher
- Aaron Smith, business owner and member of the Bloomington Sustainability Commission

==== Endorsements ====
Dwayne Lowman

Labor unions

- AFSCME Council 5
- Minneapolis Area Realtors
- Minneapolis Building and Construction Trades Council
- Minneapolis Regional Labor Federation
Aaron Smith

Party chapters

- Senate District 50 DFL
- Senate District 51 DFL

==== Results ====
Results by precinct: Lowman: 30%–40%; 40%–50%; Keehan: 30%–40%

District I results
Candidate	Round 1		Round 2		
Candidate	Votes	%	Transfer	Votes	%
Dwayne A. Lowman (incumbent)	1,571	37.01	+174	1,745	52.56
Aaron C Smith	1,363	32.11	+212	1,575	47.44
Jessica Keehan	1,300	30.62	-1300	Eliminated	
Write-ins	11	0.26	-11	Eliminated	
Total active votes	4,245	100.00	-1,311	3,320	100.00
Source: Bloomington City Clerk's Office

=== District II ===
District II covers the southwest quadrant of Bloomington and has been represented by Shawn Nelson since 2018. Nelson is seeking re-election. Nelson was last re-elected in 2023, winning with 51.87% of the vote in the first round of tabulation.

==== Candidates ====
===== Filed =====
- Andrew 'Andy' Luckraft, pilot
- Shawn Nelson, incumbent councilmember (District II)

==== Endorsements ====
Shawn Nelson

Labor unions

- AFSCME Council 5
- Minneapolis Area Realtors
- Minneapolis Regional Labor Federation

==== Results ====
Results by precinct: Nelson: 50%–60%; 60%–70%

District II results
Candidate	Round 1	
Candidate	Votes	%
Shawn Nelson (incumbent)	2,903	66.70
Andrew Luckraft	1,436	33.00
Write-ins	13	0.30
Total active votes	4,352	100.00
Source: Bloomington City Clerk's Office

== School board ==
Four of seven school board seats, currently occupied by Beth Beebe, Tom Bennett, Matt Dymoke, and Dawn Steigauf, are up for election in 2025 for four year terms. All Bloomington School Board seats are non-partisan at-large positions.

=== Candidates ===
==== Filed ====
- Tom Bennett, incumbent school board member and vice-chair
- Alex Blanco, Bloomington Public Schools alum
- Beverly Buchanan, Bloomington Public Schools parent
- Matt Dymoke, incumbent school board member and chair
- Ted Moore, Bloomington Public Schools parent
- Dawn Steigauf, incumbent school board member

==== Withdrawn ====
- Dani Indovino Cawley, disability and education advocate

==== Declined ====
- Beth Beebe, incumbent school board member and treasurer

=== Endorsements ===
Tom Bennett

Labor unions

- Education Minnesota
- Minneapolis Regional Labor Federation
- SEIU Minnesota State Council

Party chapters

- Senate District 50 DFL
- Senate District 51 DFL
Matt Dymoke

Labor unions

- Education Minnesota
- Minneapolis Regional Labor Federation
- SEIU Minnesota State Council

Party chapters

- Senate District 50 DFL
- Senate District 51 DFL
Ted Moore

Labor unions

- Education Minnesota
- Minneapolis Regional Labor Federation
- SEIU Minnesota State Council

Party chapters

- Senate District 50 DFL
- Senate District 51 DFL
Dawn Steigauf

Organizations

- Education Minnesota
- Minneapolis Regional Labor Federation
- SEIU Minnesota State Council

Party chapters

- Senate District 50 DFL
- Senate District 51 DFL
Dani Indovino Cawley (withdrawn)

Party chapters

- Senate District 50 DFL
- Senate District 51 DFL

=== Results ===
Results by precinct: Bennett: 20%–30%; Steigauf: 20%–30%; Dymoke: 20%–30%; Tie No votes

School Board results
Candidate	Votes	%
Tom Bennett (incumbent)	10,544	22.43
Dawn Steigauf (incumbent)	10,412	22.15
Matt Dymoke (incumbent)	10,186	21.67
Ted Moore	9,062	19.27
Beverly Buchanan	3,779	8.04
Alex Blanco	2,495	5.31
Write-ins	537	1.14
Total active votes	47,015	100.00
Source: Minnesota Secretary of State
