= 2025 Biloxi mayoral election =

Mississippi election

← 2021	June 3, 2025	2029 →
Candidate	Andrew "FoFo" Gilich	Andy Linville	Farren Santibanez
Party	Republican	Independent	Libertarian
Popular vote	2,630	461	187
Percentage	80.2%	14.1%	5.7%
Mayor before election
Andrew "FoFo" Gilich
Republican
Elected Mayor
Andrew "FoFo" Gilich
Republican

The 2025 Biloxi mayoral election in Biloxi, Mississippi, took place on June 3, 2025, concurrently with other Biloxi municipal races. Primary elections took place on April 1. Incumbent Republican mayor Andrew "FoFo" Gilich won re-election to a third full term in office.

== Republican primary ==
=== Candidates ===
==== Qualified ====
- Andrew "FoFo" Gilich, incumbent mayor
- Jordan N. Gollub, segregationist and former KKK member

=== Results ===
Republican primary results
Party	Candidate	Votes	%
Republican	Andrew "FoFo" Gilich (incumbent)	2,422	89.2
Republican	Jordan N. Gollub	294	10.8
Total votes		2,716	100.00

== Minor party and independent candidates ==
=== Candidates ===
==== Qualified ====
- Andy Linville (Independent)
- Farren Santibanez (Libertarian)

== General election ==
=== Results ===
2025 Biloxi mayoral election
Party	Candidate	Votes	%
Republican	Andrew "FoFo" Gilich	2,630	80.2%
Independent	Andy Linville	461	14.1%
Libertarian	Farren Santibanez	187	5.7%
Total votes		3,278	100.0%
