= 2025 Sterling Heights mayoral election =

November 4, 2025
Candidate	Michael C. Taylor	Matthew Ryan
Party	Nonpartisan	Nonpartisan
Popular vote	11,908	6,288
Percentage	65.17%	34.42%
Mayor before election
Michael C. Taylor
Independent
Elected mayor
Michael C. Taylor
Independent

The 2025 mayoral election in Sterling Heights, Michigan, took place on November 4, 2025. Incumbent mayor Michael C. Taylor was re-elected to a fourth term as mayor.

== Background ==
No mayoral primary was held, due to only two candidates filing to run.

== General Election ==
=== Candidates ===
- Matthew Ryan, business owner
- Michael C. Taylor, incumbent mayor

== Results ==
General election results
Candidate	Votes	%
Michael C. Taylor	11,908	65.17%
Matthew Ryan	6,288	34.42%
Write-in	75	0.41%
Total votes	18,271	100.00
