= 2025 Tuscaloosa mayoral election =

Municipal election in Alabama, United States

- March 4, 2025
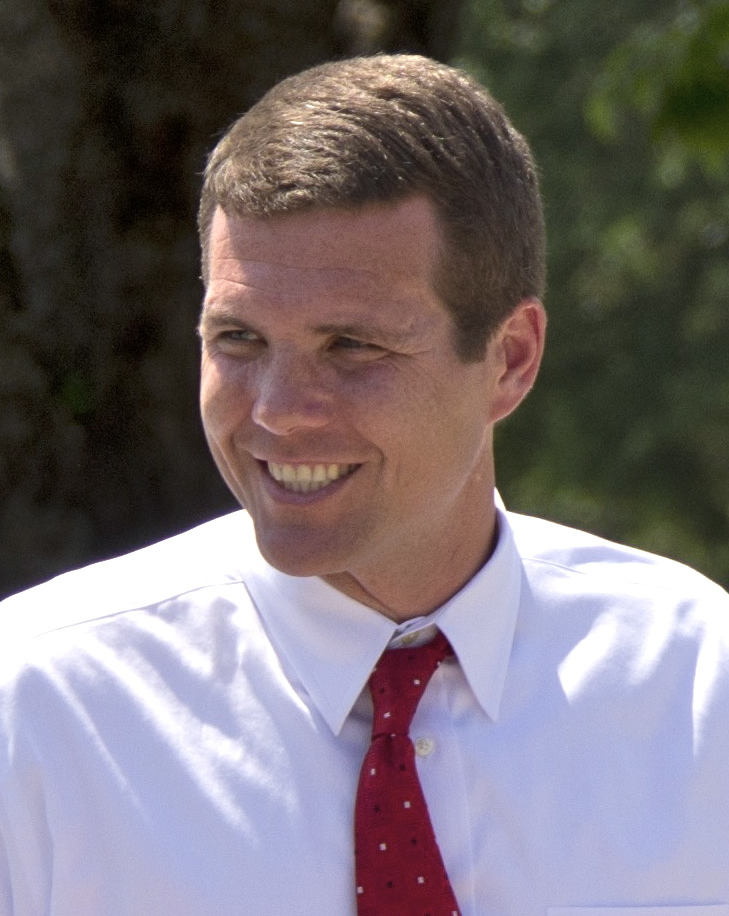

Nominee	Walt Maddox	Denson Ferrell II
Party	Nonpartisan	Nonpartisan
Alliance	Democratic
Popular vote	5,729	860
Percentage	85.44%	13.05%
Mayor before election
Walt Maddox
Democratic
Elected Mayor
Walt Maddox
Democratic

The 2025 Tuscaloosa mayoral election took place on March 4, 2025. Incumbent mayor Walt Maddox ran for, and won, a sixth term as Tuscaloosa mayor.

== Candidates ==
=== Declared ===
- Denson Ferrell II, police officer
- Walt Maddox, incumbent mayor

== General election ==
2025 Tuscaloosa mayoral election
Candidate	Votes	%
Walt Maddox	5,729	86.95%
Denson Ferrell II	860	13.05%

== See also ==
- List of mayors of Tuscaloosa, Alabama
