= 2009 Erie County, Pennsylvania Executive election =

2009 Erie County Executive election
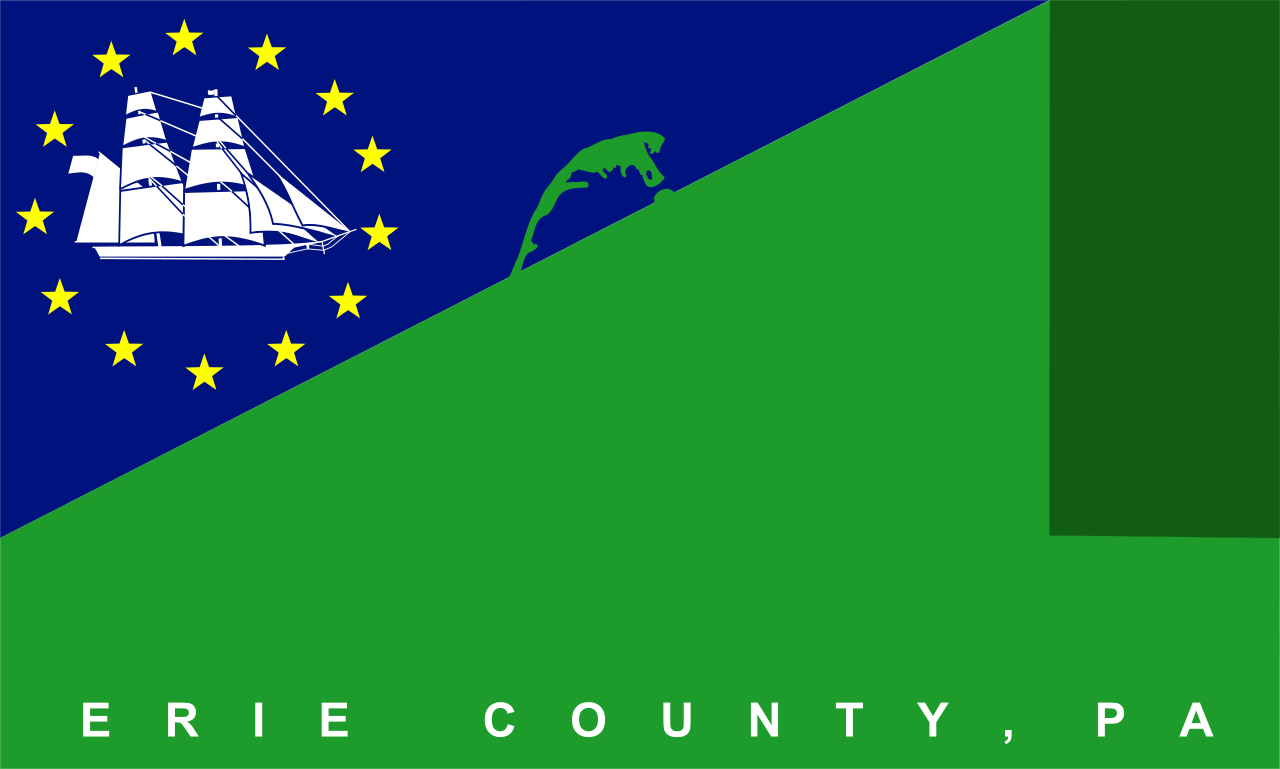
- November 3, 2009

Nominee	Barry Grossman	Mike Kerner
Party	Democratic	Republican
Popular vote	26,211	25,868
Percentage	50.33%	49.67%
County Executive before election
Mark A. DiVecchio
Democratic
Elected County Executive
Barry Grossman
Democratic

The 2009 Erie County Executive election was held on November 3, 2009. Incumbent Democratic County Executive Mark A. DiVecchio ran for re-election to a second term. However, he was defeated in the Democratic primary by restaurant owner Barry Grossman. In the general election, Grossman faced Mike Kerner, a manufacturing executive and the Republican nominee. Grossman narrowly defeated Kerner, winning by a 343-vote margin. The closeness of the race, coupled with the discovery of several uncounted voting machines two days after the election, meant that the race was not immediately called, and Kerner initially declined to concede.

== Democratic primary ==
=== Candidates ===
- Barry Grossman, restaurant owner, 2005 candidate for Mayor of Erie, Pennsylvania, former professor
- Mark A. DiVecchio, incumbent County Executive
- Anthony Andrezeski, former State Senator

=== Campaign ===
During the campaign, both Grossman and Andrezeski attacked DiVecchio for his conduct as County Executive. Grossman criticized him for moving too slowly in establishing a local community college. Andrezeski recorded several videos, posted to YouTube, in which he accused DiVecchio of being "corrupt," "incompetent," and "in over his head," and suggested that he had spread rumors about the personal life of County Controller Sue Weber after she accused him of misusing county resources. DiVecchio condemned the videos as "absolutely, positively disgusting," and saying that Andrezeski "should be ashamed of himself."

=== Results ===
Democratic primary results
Party	Candidate	Votes	%
Democratic	Barry Grossman	12,323	47.66%
Democratic	Mark A. DiVecchio (inc.)	10,087	39.01%
Democratic	Anthony Andrezeski	3,447	13.33%
Total votes		25,857	100.00%

== Republican primary ==
=== Candidates ===
- Mike Kerner, manufacturing executive
- Gil Rocco, accountant and computer consultant

=== Results ===
Republican primary results
Party	Candidate	Votes	%
Republican	Mike Kerner	8,280	59.22%
Republican	Gil Rocco	5,701	40.78%
Total votes		13,981	100.00%

== General election ==
=== Results ===
2009 Erie County Executive election
Party	Candidate	Votes	%
Democratic	Barry Grossman	26,211	50.33%
Republican	Mike Kerner	25,868	49.67%
Total votes		52,079	100.00%
Democratic hold			
