= Alex Rose (politician) =

American politician

At-large member of the Allegheny County Council
- Incumbent
- Assumed office November 28, 2025
- Preceded by: Mike Embrescia

Personal details
- Party: Independent (since 2025)
- Other political affiliations: Democratic (until 2025)
- Education: University of Pittsburgh

Alex Rose is an American politician who is one of two at-large members of the Allegheny County Council. He is an independent politician and was elected as a member of the Labor Party.

== Career ==
Rose graduated from the University of Pittsburgh. He worked for a number of Democratic campaigns, including the Hillary Clinton 2016 presidential campaign, and various court of common pleas campaigns.

=== Allegheny County Council ===
Rose first announced his bid for an at-large seat on the county council in April 2025. In order to run, Rose changed his party registration from Democratic to independent, as one at-large seat on the council must be held by a minority party. The special election was scheduled for November after Republican Mike Embrescia was appointed to fill a vacancy. Embrescia challenged the need to hold the election, but judges ruled that it must appear on the ballot. To qualify for the ballot, Rose gathered 7,000 signatures prior to August 1.

Rose appeared on the ballot under the Labor Party label, stating he chose it because "our citizen body understands that organized labor built this county." He defeated Embrescia on November 4, 2025, with 56% of the vote. He was sworn in on November 28, 2025.
