= Todd Jordan =

American football punter and quarterback (born 1970)

29th Mayor of Tupelo, Mississippi
- Incumbent
- Assumed office July 1, 2021
- Preceded by: Jason Shelton

Personal details
- Born: June 18, 1970 (age 56) Tupelo, Mississippi, U.S.
- Party: Republican

Todd Jordan
No. 8
- Positions: Punter, Quarterback

Personal information
- Listed height: 6 ft 2 in (1.88 m)
- Listed weight: 238 lb (108 kg)

Career information
- College: Mississippi State

Career history
- 1994: Las Vegas Posse*
- 1995: San Antonio Texans
- * Offseason or practice squad member only

Awards and highlights
- First-team All-SEC (1992)

Todd Jordan (born June 18, 1970) is an American politician and former football player who is currently the mayor of Tupelo, Mississippi. He was a punter for one season with the San Antonio Texans of the Canadian Football League. He played college football for the Mississippi State Bulldogs.

== Football career ==
=== College career ===
Jordan played for the Mississippi State Bulldogs as a quarterback and punter from 1989 to 1993. He recorded 2,741 yards and fourteen touchdowns while completing 205 of 440 passes during his college career. He also accumulated 4,793 punting yards on 112 punts.

=== College statistics ===
Year	Team	G	Passing							Rushing			Total offense		Punting		
Year	Team	G	CMP	ATT	CMP%	YDS	TD	INT	RAT	ATT	YDS	TD	TOFF	TDR	P	YDS	AVG
1989	Mississippi State	11	41	84	48.8	451	2	8	82.7	10	-40	0	411	2	0	0	0.0
1990	Mississippi State	Redshirt															
1991	Mississippi State	11	6	11	54.5	87	1	2	114.6	8	13	1	100	2	4	123	30.8
1992	Mississippi State	10	27	51	52.9	268	0	1	93.2	17	-26	0	242	0	52	2,267	43.6
1993	Mississippi State	11	131	294	44.6	1,935	11	9	106.1	42	-13	1	1,922	12	56	2,403	42.9
Totals		43	205	440	46.6	2,741	14	20	100.3	77	-66	2	2,675	16	112	4,793	42.8

=== Professional career ===
Jordan was on the Las Vegas Posse's practice roster in 1994 and became a free agent when the team folded. He played in eighteen games for the San Antonio Texans as the team's punter during the 1995 season. He recorded 4,459 punting yards on 107 punts.
