= List of mayors of Springfield, Missouri =

Mayor of The City of Springfield
- Incumbent; Jeff Schrag since: April 21, 2025; (1 years ago)
- Style: His/Her Honor
- Residence: Private residence
- Term length: 4 years
- Inaugural holder: A. Maurice
- Formation: 19th century

The mayor of Springfield is the highest ranking elected official in the city of Springfield, Missouri. Mayoral elections in Springfield are nonpartisan, and though the candidate may personally affiliate with a party, they do not appear on the ticket as a particular party's candidate. Since 1953 all mayoral elections have been voted on by the public, before then having been appointed by the city council. From 1861 to 1865, Springfield was ruled under martial law by Union and Confederate leaders during the American Civil War.

== List of Mayors ==
Name	Term Duration	Party
A. Maurice	1847-1849	no party
Joseph Burden	1849-1851	Democratic
Warren Graves	1852-1856	no party
H.S. Chenoweth	1856-1857	no party
J.S. Kimbrough	1857-1858	no party
Sempronius H. Boyd	1858-1860	Republican
J.W. Mack	1860-1861	no party
Benjamin Kite	1865-1866	Republican
James H. Creighton	1866-1867	Republican
R.B. Owen	1867-1868	no party
J.B. Dexter	1868-1869	no party
W.E. Gilmore	1869-1870	Republican
L.H. Murray	1871-1872	Democratic
Jonathan Faribanks	1872-1873	Republican
John McGregor	1873-1873	Democratic
John Lisenby	1874-1875	Republican
Joseph J. Weaver	1875-1876	no party
W.A. Hall	1876-1877	Democratic
Homer F. Fellows	1877-1879	Whig
Joseph McAdoo	1879-1880	Republican
Marzavan J Rountree	1880-1881	Democratic
James Abbott	1881-1882	Republican
George Sale Day	1882-1883	no party
John McGregor	1883-1884	Democratic
Ralph Walker	1884-1886	Democratic
J.S. Atkinson	1887-1888	Republican
Ralph Walker	1888-1890	Democratic
E.D. Parce	1890-1894	no party
Jeremiah Fenton	1894-1896	Republican
V.S. Barlett	1896-1898	no party
W.A. Hall	1898-1900	Democratic
Ralph Walker	1900-1902	Democratic
J.E.Mallette	1902-1904	Republican
Ben E. Meyer	1904-1906	Democratic
James Bain	1906-1908	Democratic
Louis P. Ernst	1908-1910	Republican
Robert E. Lee	1910-1912	Democratic
George Culler	1912-1914	Republican
T.K. Bowman	1914-1916	Democratic
J.J. Gideon	1916-1920	Republican
W.E. Freeman	1920-1928	Democratic
T.H. Gideon	1928-1932	Republican
Harry D. Durst	1932-1940	Democratic
Harry Ben Carr	1940-1948	Democratic
Otis L. Barbarick	1948-1951	Republican
J. Oliver Gideon	1952-1952	no party
Nathan Karchmer	1952-1952	no party
W.I. English	1952-1955	no party
Warren Turner	1955-1957	no party
Joe Ben Wann	1957-1959	no party
David C. Scott	1959-1962	no party
E.I. Anderson	1962-1967	no party
Carl Stillwell	1967-1972	no party
Jim Payne	1972-1978	no party
Paul Redfearn	1978-1981	no party
Harry C. Strawn	1981-1983	no party
George Scruggs	1983-1987	no party
Thomas J. Carlson	1988-1993	no party
N.L. McCartney	1993-1995	no party
Leland Gannaway	1995-1998	no party
Thomas Carlson	1999-1999	no party
Leland Gannaway	1999-2001	no party
Thomas Carlson	2001-2009	Independent
Jim O'Neal	2009-2012	Independent
Bob Stephens	2012-2017	Libertarian
Ken McClure	2017–2025	Independent
Jeff Schrag	2025–2029	Independent

== Mayors of Note ==
- Sempronius H. Boyd served as mayor of Springfield from 1858 to 1860, he became a member of the United States House of Representatives representing Missouri's 4th congressional district and was later Minister of the United States to Siam.
- Homer F. Fellows served as the city's only Whig mayor, later becoming an Abolitionist, then becoming a Republican.
- Bob Stephens served as the city's only Libertarian mayor, though elections are non-partisan.
- Elected as a Republican, W. E. Gilmore ran for congress as a Liberal Republican in 1870.
- Nathan Karchmer was the first and so far only Jewish mayor of Springfield.
- Thomas Carlson, having served seven terms, is the longest serving mayor in the city's history.
