= 206th New York State Legislature =

New York state legislative session

The 206th New York State Legislature consists of the New York State Senate and the New York State Assembly.

It has been in session since January 2025, during the administrations of Governor Kathy Hochul

== Senate members ==
District	Senator	Party	First elected	Counties represented	Residence
1	Anthony Palumbo	Republican	2020	Suffolk	New Suffolk
2	Mario Mattera	Republican	2020	Suffolk	St. James
3	Dean Murray	Republican	2022	Suffolk	East Patchogue
4	Monica Martinez	Democratic	2022	Suffolk	Brentwood
5	Steven Rhoads	Republican	2022	Nassau	Bellmore
6	Siela Bynoe	Democratic	2024	Nassau	Westbury
7	Jack Martins	Republican	2022	Nassau	Great Neck
8	Alexis Weik	Republican	2020	Nassau, Suffolk	Sayville
9	Patricia Canzoneri-Fitzpatrick	Republican	2022	Nassau	Malverne
10	James Sanders Jr.	Democratic	2012	Queens	Queens (Far Rockaway)
11	Toby Ann Stavisky	Democratic	1999*	Queens	Queens (Whitestone)
12	Michael Gianaris	Democratic	2010	Queens	Queens (Astoria)
13	Jessica Ramos	Democratic	2018	Queens	Queens (East Elmhurst)
14	Leroy Comrie	Democratic	2014	Queens	Queens (St. Albans)
15	Joseph Addabbo Jr.	Democratic	2008	Queens	Queens (Ozone Park)
16	John Liu	Democratic	2018	Queens	Queens (Flushing)
17	Stephen T. Chan	Republican	2024	Kings	Brooklyn (Bensonhurst)
18	Julia Salazar	Democratic	2018	Kings	Brooklyn (Bushwick)
19	Roxanne Persaud	Democratic	2015*	Kings	Brooklyn (Canarsie)
20	Zellnor Myrie	Democratic	2018	Kings	Brooklyn (Prospect Lefferts Gardens)
21	Kevin Parker	Democratic	2002	Kings	Brooklyn (Flatbush)
22	Simcha Felder	Democratic	2012	Kings	Brooklyn (Borough Park)
23	Jessica Scarcella-Spanton	Democratic	2022	Kings, Richmond	Staten Island (North Shore)
24	Andrew Lanza	Republican	2006	Richmond	Staten Island (Great Kills)
25	Jabari Brisport	Democratic	2020	Kings	Brooklyn (Clinton Hill)
26	Andrew Gounardes	Democratic	2018	Kings	Brooklyn (Bay Ridge)
27	Brian P. Kavanagh	Democratic	2017*	New York	Manhattan (East Side)
28	Liz Krueger	Democratic	2002*	New York	Manhattan (Upper East Side)
29	José M. Serrano	Democratic	2004	New York, Bronx	The Bronx (South Bronx)
30	Cordell Cleare	Democratic	2021*	New York	Manhattan (Harlem)
31	Robert Jackson	Democratic	2018	New York, Bronx	Manhattan (Fort George)
32	Luis R. Sepúlveda	Democratic	2018*	Bronx	The Bronx (West Farms)
33	Gustavo Rivera	Democratic	2010	Bronx	The Bronx (University Heights)
34	Nathalia Fernandez	Democratic	2022	Bronx, Westchester	The Bronx (Morris Park)
35	Andrea Stewart-Cousins	Democratic	2006	Westchester	Yonkers
36	Jamaal Bailey	Democratic	2016	Bronx, Westchester	The Bronx (Baychester)
37	Shelley Mayer	Democratic	2018*	Westchester	Yonkers
38	Bill Weber	Republican	2022	Rockland	Montebello
39	Robert Rolison	Republican	2022	Dutchess, Orange, Putnam	Poughkeepsie
40	Peter Harckham	Democratic	2018	Putnam, Rockland, Westchester	South Salem
41	Michelle Hinchey	Democratic	2020	Columbia, Dutchess, Greene, Ulster	Saugerties
42	James Skoufis	Democratic	2018	Orange	Cornwall
43	Jake Ashby	Republican	2022	Albany, Rensselaer, Washington	Castleton-on-Hudson
44	Jim Tedisco	Republican	2016	Saratoga, Schenectady	Glenville
45	Dan Stec	Republican	2020	Clinton, Essex, Franklin, Saint Lawrence, Warren, Washington	Queensbury
46	Patricia Fahy	Democratic	2024	Albany, Montgomery, Schenectady	Delmar
47	Brad Hoylman-Sigal	Democratic	2012	New York	Manhattan (Greenwich Village)
48	Rachel May	Democratic	2018	Cayuga, Onondaga	Syracuse
49	Mark Walczyk	Republican	2022	Fulton, Hamilton, Herkimer, Jefferson, Lewis, Oswego, St. Lawrence	Watertown
50	Chris Ryan	Democratic	2024	Onondaga, Oswego	Syracuse
51	Peter Oberacker	Republican	2020	Broome, Chenango, Delaware, Herkimer, Otsego, Schoharie, Sullivan, Ulster	Schenevus
52	Lea Webb	Democratic	2022	Broome, Cortland, Tompkins	Binghamton
53	Joseph Griffo	Republican	2006	Chenango, Madison, Oneida	Rome
54	Pam Helming	Republican	2016	Livingston, Monroe, Ontario, Wayne	Canandaigua
55	Samra Brouk	Democratic	2020	Monroe	Rochester
56	Jeremy Cooney	Democratic	2020	Monroe	Rochester
57	George Borrello	Republican	2019*	Allegany, Cattaraugus, Chautauqua, Genesee, Wyoming	Sunset Bay
58	Tom O'Mara	Republican	2010	Allegany, Chemung, Schuyler, Seneca, Steuben, Tioga, Yates	Big Flats
59	Kristen Gonzalez	Democratic	2022	Kings, New York, Queens	Queens (Long Island City)
60	Patrick M. Gallivan	Republican	2020	Erie	Elma
61	Sean Ryan	Democratic	2020	Erie	Buffalo
62	Rob Ortt	Republican	2014	Monroe, Niagara, Orleans	North Tonawanda
63	April Baskin	Democratic	2024	Erie	Buffalo

* First elected in a special election.

== Members of the New York State Assembly ==
District	Image	Party	Member	First elected	Counties	Residence
1		Democratic	Tommy John Schiavoni	2024	Suffolk	Sag Harbor
2		Republican	Jodi Giglio	2020	Suffolk	Riverhead
3		Republican	Joe DeStefano	2018	Suffolk	Brookhaven
4		Democratic	Rebecca Kassay	2024	Suffolk	Port Jefferson
5		Republican	Douglas M. Smith	2018+	Suffolk	Holbrook
6		Democratic	Philip Ramos	2002	Suffolk	Brentwood
7		Republican	Jarett Gandolfo	2020	Suffolk	Sayville
8		Republican	Michael J. Fitzpatrick	2002	Suffolk	St. James
9		Republican	Michael Durso	2020	Nassau, Suffolk	Massapequa Park
10		Democratic	Steve Stern	2018+	Nassau, Suffolk	Dix Hills
11		Democratic	Kwani O'Pharrow	2024	Nassau, Suffolk	West Babylon
12		Republican	Keith Brown	2020+	Suffolk	Northport
13		Democratic	Charles D. Lavine	2004	Nassau	Glen Cove
14		Republican	David McDonough	2002+	Nassau	Merrick
15		Republican	Jake Blumencranz	2022	Nassau	Oyster Bay
16		Republican	Daniel Norber	2024	Nassau	Great Neck
17		Republican	John Mikulin	2018+	Nassau	Bethpage
18		Democratic	Noah Burroughs	2024	Nassau	Hempstead
19		Republican	Ed Ra	2010	Nassau	Garden City South
20		Republican	Eric "Ari" Brown	2022+	Nassau	Cedarhurst
21		Democratic	Judy Griffin	2024	Nassau	Rockville Centre
22		Democratic	Michaelle C. Solages	2012	Nassau	Elmont
23		Democratic	Stacey Pheffer Amato	2016	Queens	Queens (Rockaway)
24		Democratic	David Weprin	2010+	Queens	Queens (Hollis)
25		Democratic	Nily Rozic	2012	Queens	Queens (Fresh Meadows)
26		Democratic	Edward Braunstein	2010	Queens	Queens (Bayside)
27		Democratic	Sam Berger	2023+	Queens	Queens (Kew Gardens Hills)
28		Democratic	Andrew Hevesi	2005+	Queens	Queens (Forest Hills)
29		Democratic	Alicia Hyndman	2015+	Queens	Queens (Rosedale)
30		Democratic	Steven Raga	2022	Queens	Queens (Woodside)
31		Democratic	Khaleel Anderson	2020	Queens	Queens (Far Rockaway)
32		Democratic	Vivian E. Cook	1990	Queens	Queens (Jamaica)
33		Democratic	Clyde Vanel	2016+	Queens	Queens (Cambria Heights)
34		Democratic	Jessica González-Rojas	2020	Queens	Queens (East Elmhurst)
35		Democratic	Larinda Hooks	2024	Queens	Queens (East Elmhurst)
36		Democratic	Zohran Mamdani	2020	Queens	Queens (Astoria)
37		Democratic	Claire Valdez	2024	Queens	Queens (Ridgewood)
38		Democratic	Jenifer Rajkumar	2020	Queens	Queens (Woodhaven)
39		Democratic	Catalina Cruz	2018	Queens	Queens (Jackson Heights)
40		Democratic	Ron Kim	2012	Queens	Queens (Flushing)
41		Democratic	Kalman Yeger	2024	Kings (Brooklyn)	Brooklyn (Borough Park)
42		Democratic	Rodneyse Bichotte Hermelyn	2014	Kings (Brooklyn)	Brooklyn (Flatbush)
43		Democratic	Brian A. Cunningham	2022+	Kings (Brooklyn)	Brooklyn (Flatbush)
44		Democratic	Robert Carroll	2016	Kings (Brooklyn)	Brooklyn (Windsor Terrace)
45		Republican	Michael Novakhov	2022	Kings (Brooklyn)	Brooklyn (Manhattan Beach)
46		Republican	Alec Brook-Krasny	2022	Kings (Brooklyn)	Brooklyn (Coney Island)
47		Democratic	William Colton	1996	Kings (Brooklyn)	Brooklyn (Bensonhurst)
48		Democratic	Simcha Eichenstein	2018	Kings (Brooklyn)	Brooklyn (Borough Park)
49		Republican	Lester Chang	2022	Kings (Brooklyn)	Brooklyn (Midwood)
50		Democratic	Emily Gallagher	2020	Kings (Brooklyn)	Brooklyn (Greenpoint)
51		Democratic	Marcela Mitaynes	2020	Kings (Brooklyn)	Brooklyn (Sunset Park)
52		Democratic	Jo Anne Simon	2014	Kings (Brooklyn)	Brooklyn (Boerum Hill)
53		Democratic	Maritza Davila	2013+	Kings (Brooklyn)	Brooklyn (Bushwick)
54		Democratic	Erik Martin Dilan	2014	Kings (Brooklyn)	Brooklyn (Cypress Hills)
55		Democratic	Latrice Walker	2014	Kings (Brooklyn)	Brooklyn (Brownsville)
56		Democratic	Stefani Zinerman	2020	Kings (Brooklyn)	Brooklyn (Bedford-Stuyvesant)
57		Democratic	Phara Souffrant Forrest	2020	Kings (Brooklyn)	Brooklyn (Fort Greene)
58		Democratic	Monique Chandler-Waterman	2022+	Kings (Brooklyn)	Brooklyn (East Flatbush)
59		Democratic	Jaime Williams	2016+	Kings (Brooklyn)	Brooklyn (Canarsie)
60		Democratic	Nikki Lucas	2022+	Kings (Brooklyn)	Brooklyn (Starret City)
61		Democratic	Charles Fall	2018	New York (Manhattan), Richmond (Staten Island)	Staten Island (Mariners Harbor)
62		Republican	Michael Reilly	2018	Richmond (Staten Island)	Staten Island (Eltingville)
63		Republican	Sam Pirozzolo	2022	Richmond (Staten Island)	Staten Island (Castleton Corners)
64		Republican	Michael Tannousis	2020	Kings (Brooklyn), Richmond (Staten Island)	Staten Island (Great Kills)
65		Democratic	Grace Lee	2022	New York (Manhattan)	Manhattan (Financial District)
66		Democratic	Deborah J. Glick	1990	New York (Manhattan)	Manhattan (Greenwich Village)
67		Democratic	Linda Rosenthal	2006+	New York (Manhattan)	Manhattan (Upper West Side)
68		Democratic	Eddie Gibbs	2022+	New York (Manhattan)	Manhattan (Harlem)
69		Democratic	Micah Lasher	2024	New York (Manhattan)	Manhattan (Upper West Side)
70		Democratic	Jordan Wright	2024	New York (Manhattan)	Manhattan (Harlem)
71		Democratic	Al Taylor	2017+	New York (Manhattan)	Manhattan (Harlem)
72		Democratic	Manny De Los Santos	2022+	New York (Manhattan)	Manhattan (Fort George)
73		Democratic	Alex Bores	2022	New York (Manhattan)	Manhattan (Upper East Side)
74		Democratic	Harvey Epstein	2018+	New York (Manhattan)	Manhattan (East Village)
75		Democratic	Tony Simone	2022	New York (Manhattan)	Manhattan (Hell's Kitchen)
76		Democratic	Rebecca Seawright	2014	New York (Manhattan)	Manhattan (Upper East Side)
77		Democratic	Landon Dais	2024+	Bronx	The Bronx (Highbridge)
78		Democratic	George Alvarez	2022	Bronx	The Bronx (Fordham)
79		Democratic	Chantel Jackson	2020	Bronx	The Bronx (Morrisania)
80		Democratic	John Zaccaro Jr.	2022	Bronx	The Bronx (Pelham Parkway)
81		Democratic	Jeffrey Dinowitz	1994+	Bronx	The Bronx (Riverdale)
82		Democratic	Michael Benedetto	2004	Bronx	The Bronx (Pelham Bay)
83		Democratic	Carl Heastie	2000	Bronx	The Bronx (Williamsbridge)
84		Democratic	Amanda Septimo	2020	Bronx	The Bronx (South Bronx)
85		Democratic	Emerita Torres	2024	Bronx	The Bronx (South Bronx)
86		Democratic	Yudelka Tapia	2021+	Bronx	The Bronx (Fordham)
87		Democratic	Karines Reyes	2018	Bronx	The Bronx (Parkchester)
88		Democratic	Amy Paulin	2000	Westchester	Scarsdale
89		Democratic	J. Gary Pretlow	1992	Westchester	Mount Vernon
90		Democratic	Nader Sayegh	2018	Westchester	Yonkers
91		Democratic	Steven Otis	2012	Westchester	Rye
92		Democratic	MaryJane Shimsky	2022	Westchester	Dobbs Ferry
93		Democratic	Chris Burdick	2020	Westchester	Bedford
94		Republican	Matt Slater	2022	Westchester, Putnam	Yorktown
95		Democratic	Dana Levenberg	2022	Westchester, Putnam	Ossining
96		Democratic	Patrick Carroll	2024	Rockland	Bardonia
97		Democratic	Aron Wieder	2024	Rockland	Spring Valley
98		Republican	Karl A. Brabenec	2014	Orange, Rockland	Deerpark
99		Democratic	Chris Eachus	2022	Orange, Rockland	New Windsor
100		Democratic	Paula Kay	2024	Orange, Sullivan	Rock Hill
101		Republican	Brian Maher	2022	Delaware, Oneida, Orange, Otsego, Sullivan, Ulster	Montgomery
102		Republican	Christopher Tague	2018+	Albany, Delaware, Greene, Otsego, Schoharie, Ulster	Schoharie
103		Democratic	Sarahana Shrestha	2022	Dutchess, Ulster	Esopus
104		Democratic	Jonathan Jacobson	2018+	Dutchess, Orange, Ulster	Newburgh
105		Republican	Anil Beephan Jr.	2022	Dutchess	East Fishkill
106		Democratic	Didi Barrett	2012+	Columbia, Dutchess	Hudson
107		Republican	Scott Bendett	2022	Albany, Columbia, Rensselaer, Washington	Averill Park
108		Democratic	John T. McDonald III	2012	Albany, Rensselaer, Saratoga	Cohoes
109		Democratic	Gabriella Romero	2024	Albany	Albany
110		Democratic	Phillip Steck	2012	Albany, Schenectady	Colonie
111		Democratic	Angelo Santabarbara	2012	Montgomery, Schenectady	Rotterdam
112		Republican	Mary Beth Walsh	2016	Fulton, Saratoga, Schenectady	Burnt Hills
113		Democratic	Carrie Woerner	2014	Saratoga, Warren, Washington	Round Lake
114		Republican	Matt Simpson	2020	Essex, Fulton, Saratoga, Warren, Washington	Horicon
115		Democratic	Billy Jones	2016	Clinton, Essex, Franklin	Chateaugay
116		Republican	Scott Gray	2022	Jefferson, St. Lawrence	Watertown
117		Republican	Ken Blankenbush	2010	Jefferson, Lewis, Oneida, St. Lawrence	Black River
118		Republican	Robert Smullen	2018	Fulton, Hamilton, Herkimer, Montgomery, Oneida	Johnstown
119		Democratic	Marianne Buttenschon	2018	Oneida	Marcy
120		Republican	William A. Barclay	2002	Jefferson, Oswego, Wayne	Pulaski
121		Republican	Joe Angelino	2020	Broome, Chenango, Delaware, Madison, Otsego, Sullivan	Norwich
122		Republican	Brian Miller	2016	Herkimer, Madison, Oneida, Otsego	New Hartford
123		Democratic	Donna Lupardo	2004	Broome	Endwell
124		Republican	Christopher S. Friend	2010	Broome, Chemung, Tioga	Big Flats
125		Democratic	Anna Kelles	2020	Cortland, Tompkins	Ithaca
126		Republican	John Lemondes Jr.	2020	Cayuga, Onondaga	Jamesville
127		Democratic	Albert A. Stirpe Jr.	2012	Madison, Onondaga	North Syracuse
128		Democratic	Pamela Hunter	2015+	Onondaga	Syracuse
129		Democratic	William Magnarelli	1998	Onondaga	Syracuse
130		Republican	Brian Manktelow	2018	Monroe, Wayne	Lyons
131		Republican	Jeff Gallahan	2020	Broome, Cayuga, Chenango, Cortland, Madison, Ontario, Seneca	Manchester
132		Republican	Phil Palmesano	2010	Chemung, Schuyler, Seneca, Steuben, Yates	Corning
133		Republican	Andrea Bailey	2024	Livingston, Monroe, Ontario, Steuben, Wyoming	Geneseo
134		Republican	Josh Jensen	2020	Monroe	Greece
135		Democratic	Jennifer Lunsford	2020	Monroe	Perinton
136		Democratic	Sarah Clark	2020	Monroe	Rochester
137		Democratic	Demond Meeks	2020	Monroe	Rochester
138		Democratic	Harry Bronson	2010	Monroe	Rochester
139		Republican	Stephen Hawley	2006+	Erie, Genesee, Monroe, Orleans	Batavia
140		Democratic	William Conrad III	2020	Erie, Niagara	Tonawanda
141		Democratic	Crystal Peoples-Stokes	2002	Erie	Buffalo
142		Democratic	Patrick B. Burke	2018	Erie	Buffalo
143		Republican	Patrick Chludzinski	2024	Erie	Cheektowaga
144		Republican	Paul Bologna	2024	Erie, Niagara	Clarence
145		Republican	Angelo Morinello	2016	Erie, Niagara	Niagara Falls
146		Democratic	Karen McMahon	2018	Erie	Williamsville
147		Republican	David DiPietro	2012	Erie, Wyoming	East Aurora
148		Republican	Joe Sempolinski	2024	Allegany, Cattaraugus, Steuben	Canisteo
149		Democratic	Jonathan Rivera	2020	Erie	Buffalo
150		Republican	Andrew Molitor	2024	Erie, Chautauqua	Westfield

- +Elected in a special election
