= 2026 New York State Assembly election =

2026 New York Assembly election
- November 3, 2026

All 150 seats in the New York State Assembly 76 seats needed for a majority
- Reporting: 95% as of Nov 10 at 5:45 PM EST
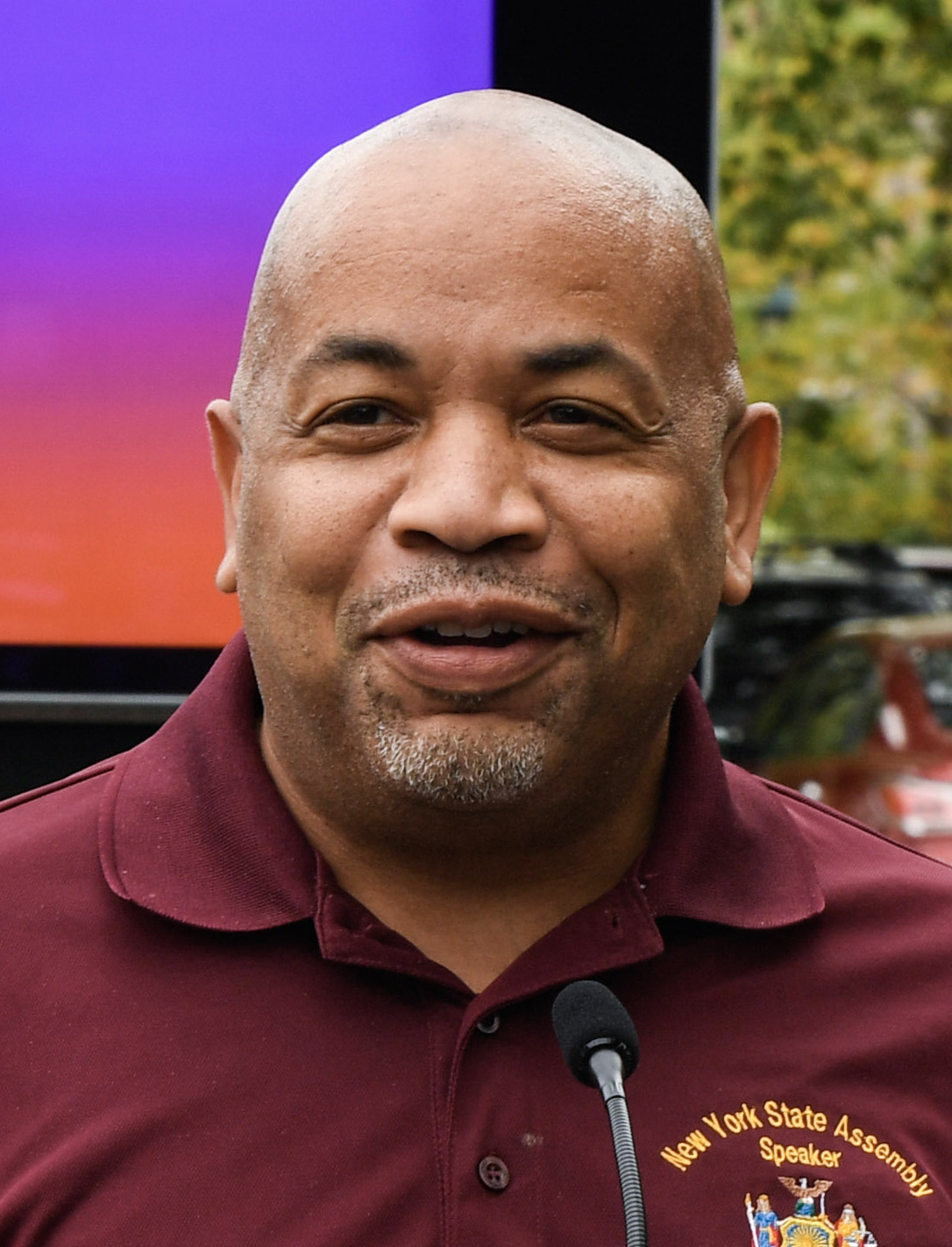

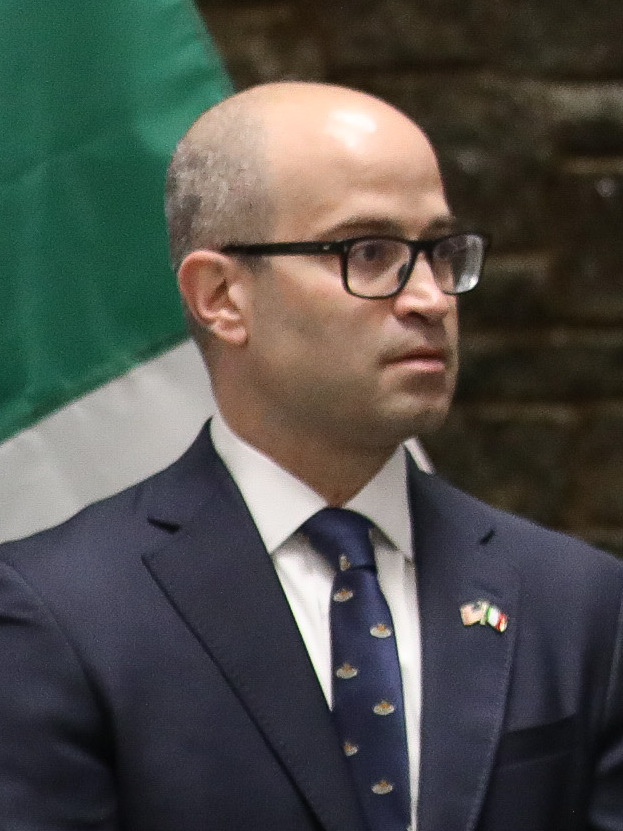
	Majority party	Minority party
Leader	Carl Heastie	Ed Ra
Party	Democratic	Republican
Leader since	February 3, 2015	February 9, 2026
Leader's seat	83rd district	19th district
Last election	103 seats, 54.6%	47 seats, 37.0%
Seats before	103	47 seats
Seats won	111	39
Seat change	▲8	▼8
- Democratic hold Democratic gain Republican hold Republican gain TBD Result
Speaker before election
Carl Heastie
Democratic
Elected Speaker
TBD

The 2026 New York State Assembly election was held on November 3, 2026. Primary elections were held on June 23, 2026. The Democratic Party has held a majority in the New York State Assembly since 1975. It was held alongside elections for governor, attorney general, comptroller, United States House of Representatives, and State Senate.

Candidates were required to file paperwork between March 30 and April 2, 2026, to run.

== Retirements ==
As of July 2026, 26 assemblymembers (14 Democrats and 12 Republicans) have announced their retirement, 11 of whom (7 Democrats and 4 Republicans) are retiring to run for other offices.

=== Democrats ===
1. 23rd district: Stacey Pheffer Amato is retiring.
2. 30th district: Steven Raga is retiring to run for the New York State Senate.
3. 32nd district: Vivian E. Cook is retiring.
4. 34th district: Jessica González-Rojas is retiring to run for the New York State Senate.
5. 37th district: Claire Valdez is retiring to run for the United States House of Representatives.
6. 65th district: Grace Lee is retiring to run for the New York State Senate.
7. 66th district: Deborah J. Glick is retiring.
8. 69th district: Micah Lasher is retiring to run for the United States House of Representatives.
9. 73rd district: Alex Bores is retiring to run for the United States House of Representatives.
10. 90th district: Nader Sayegh is retiring.
11. 119th district: Marianne Buttenschon is retiring.
12. 123rd district: Donna Lupardo is retiring.
13. 141st district: Crystal Peoples-Stokes is retiring.
14. 149th district: Jonathan Rivera is retiring to run for the New York State Senate.

=== Republicans ===
1. 7th district: Jarett Gandolfo is retiring to run for the New York State Senate.
2. 12th district: Keith Brown is retiring.
3. 14th district: David McDonough is retiring.
4. 15th district: Jake Blumencranz is retiring to run for the New York State Senate.
5. 16th district: Daniel Norber is retiring.
6. 102nd district: Christopher Tague is retiring to run for the New York State Senate.
7. 117th district: Ken Blankenbush is retiring.
8. 118th district: Robert Smullen is retiring to run for the United States House of Representatives.
9. 120th district: William A. Barclay is retiring.
10. 130th district: Brian Manktelow is retiring.
11. 131st district: Jeff Gallahan is retiring.
12. 145th district: Angelo Morinello is retiring.

== Incumbents defeated ==
=== In primary elections ===
==== Democrats ====
Five Democrats lost renomination.

1. 38th district: Jenifer Rajkumar lost renomination to David Orkin.
2. 54th district: Erik Martin Dilan lost renomination to Christian Celeste Tate.
3. 56th district: Stefani Zinerman lost renomination to Eon Tyrell Huntley.
4. 68th district: Eddie Gibbs lost renomination to Diana Ayala.
5. 129th district: Bill Magnarelli lost renomination to Maurice Brown.

== Crossover seats ==
This is a list of State Assembly seats that voted for one party in the 2024 presidential election and another in the 2024 State Assembly election.

=== Democratic ===
There are 11 districts which Donald Trump won in 2024 that are represented by Democrats.

District		Incumbent			
Location	Trump margin of victory in 2024	Member	Party	First elected	Incumbent margin of victory in 2024
23	R+13.3	Stacey Pheffer Amato (retiring)	Democratic	2016	D+3.3
27	R+8.2	Sam Berger	Democratic	2023 (special)	D+14.8
40	R+2.1	Ron Kim	Democratic	2012	D+10.9
41	R+3.7	Kalman Yeger	Democratic	2024	D+98.2 (Note: Yeger was unopposed in the general election. The margin of victory is between Yeger and write-in votes.)
47	R+23.5	William Colton	Democratic	1996	D+21.4
48	R+70.4	Simcha Eichenstein	Democratic	2018	D+97.8 (Note: Eichenstein was unopposed in the general election. The margin of victory is between Eichenstein and write-in votes.)
97	R+27.6	Aron Wieder	Democratic	2024	D+7.7
99	R+19.8	Chris Eachus	Democratic	2022	D+13.3
100	R+0.8	Paula Kay	Democratic	2024	D+5.2
115	R+1.3	Michael Cashman	Democratic	2025 (special)	D+98.8 (Note: Billy Jones was unopposed in the general election. The margin of victory is between Jones and write-in votes.)
119	R+14.5	Marianne Buttenschon (retiring)	Democratic	2018	D+1.5

=== Republican ===
There are four districts which Kamala Harris won in 2024 that are represented by Republicans.

District		Incumbent			
Location	Harris margin of victory in 2024	Member	Party	First elected	Incumbent margin of victory in 2024
107	D+3.4	Scott Bendett	Republican	2022	R+5.8
112	D+0.2	Mary Beth Walsh	Republican	2016	R+17.7
126	D+0.1	John Lemondes Jr.	Republican	2020	R+10.0
143	D+1.0	Patrick Chludzinski	Republican	2024	R+3.8

== Special elections ==
There are three special elections for the 206th New York State Legislature, listed here by date and district. Under New York state law, vacancies in the State Assembly and other offices are filled by special elections, scheduled separately from the regular election cycle. The winners of these special elections will serve the remainder of the unexpired terms and are expected to seek full terms in the 2026 general election.

District	Incumbent			This race	
District	Member	Party	First elected	Results	Candidates
115	Billy Jones	Democratic	2016	Incumbent resigned August 29, 2025, to lead Clinton Community College's Institute for Advanced Manufacturing. New member elected November 4, 2025. Democratic hold.	▌▌ ✓ Michael Cashman (Democratic) 52.28%; ▌▌Brent M. Davison (Republican) 47.65%
36	Zohran Mamdani	Democratic	2020	Incumbent resigned December 31, 2025, to become mayor of New York City. New member elected February 3, 2026. Democratic hold.	▌▌ ✓ Diana Moreno (Democratic) 74.10%; ▌Rana Abdelhamid (Queens For All) 17.07%; ▌Mary Jobaida (People First) 7.61%
74	Harvey Epstein	Democratic	2018 (special)	Incumbent resigned December 4, 2025, to become a New York City councilman. New member elected February 3, 2026. Democratic hold.	▌ ✓ Keith Powers (Democratic) 82.53%; ▌▌Joseph W. Foley (Republican) 16.47%

=== 2025 ===
One State Assembly seat became vacant during the 206th New York State Legislature in 2025 due to resignations following election to other offices.

A special election for district 115 was held on November 4, 2025. Party nominations were made by county party committees, rather than through primary elections.

==== District 115 ====
2025 New York's 115th State Assembly district special election
- November 4, 2025
Nominee	Michael Cashman	Brent M. Davison
Party	Democratic	Republican
Alliance	Working Families	Conservative
Popular vote	19,797	18,043
Percentage	52.28%	47.65%
Assemblymember before election
Billy Jones
Democratic
Elected Assemblymember
Michael Cashman
Democratic

In 2024, incumbent Democratic assemblyman Billy Jones ran unopposed to win a fifth term with 99.39% of the vote. On August 29, 2025, Jones resigned from the State Assembly to accept a position leading Clinton Community College's Institute for Advanced Manufacturing. On November 4, Democratic Plattsburgh town supervisor Michael Cashman won the special election with 52.28% of the vote against Republican Brent M. Davison to succeed Jones. Cashman was sworn in on November 13.

===== Candidates =====
====== Declared ======
- Michael Cashman (Democratic/Working Families), Plattsburgh town supervisor (2016–2025)
- Brent M. Davison (Republican/Conservative), retired Troop B commander of the New York State Police

==== Fundraising ====
Campaign finance reports as of December 31, 2025
Candidate	Contributions	Loans	Expenditures
Michael Cashman (D)	$405,608.20	$0.00	$365,843.91
Brent M. Davison (R)	$313,121.44	$0.00	$310,021.35
Source: Transparency USA

===== Results =====
2025 New York's 115th State Assembly district special election
Party	Candidate	Votes	%	±%
Democratic	Michael Cashman	18,164	47.97%	▼51.42%
Working Families	Michael Cashman	1,633	4.31%	New
Total	Michael Cashman	19,797	52.28%	▼47.11%
Republican	Brent M. Davison	16,230	42.86%	New
Conservative	Brent M. Davison	1,813	4.79%	New
Total	Brent M. Davison	18,043	47.65%	New
Write-in		25	0.07%	▼0.54%
Total votes		37,865	100.00%	N/A
Democratic hold		Swing	▼93.67%	

=== 2026 ===
Two State Assembly seats became vacant during the 206th New York State Legislature in 2026 due to resignations following election to other offices.

Special elections for districts 36 and 74 were held on February 3, 2026. Party nominations were made by county party committees, rather than through primary elections.

==== District 36 ====
2026 New York's 36th State Assembly district special election
- February 3, 2026

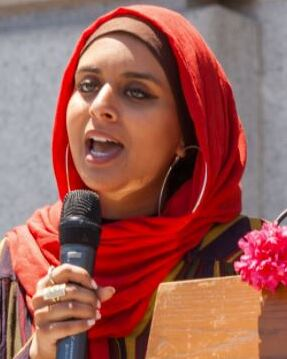

Nominee	Diana Moreno	Rana Abdelhamid	Mary Jobaida
Party	Democratic	Queens For All	People First
Alliance	Working Families
Popular vote	6,472	1,491	665
Percentage	74.10%	17.07%	7.61%
Assemblymember before election
Zohran Mamdani
Democratic
Elected Assemblymember
Diana Moreno
Democratic

In 2024, incumbent Democratic assemblyman Zohran Mamdani ran unopposed to win a third term with 98.45% of the vote. On December 31, 2025, Mamdani resigned from the State Assembly to become the mayor of New York City after winning the election on November 4. On February 3, 2026, Democrat Diana Moreno won the special election with 74.1% of the vote against Rana Abdelhamid and Mary Jobaida to succeed Mamdani. Moreno was sworn in on February 4.

===== Candidates =====
====== Declared ======
- Diana Moreno (Democratic/Working Families), former communications coordinator of New York City Democratic Socialists of America (2023–2024)
- Rana Abdelhamid (Queens For All), founder of Hijabis of New York and Malikah
- Meherunnisa "Mary" Jobaida (People First)

====== Declined ======
- Shivani Dhir (running for this seat in the primary election)

===== Endorsements =====
Diana Moreno

U.S. senators

- Bernie Sanders, Vermont (2007–present) (Independent)

U.S. representatives

- Gregory Meeks, NY-05 (1998–present)
- Alexandria Ocasio-Cortez, NY-14 (2019–present)

Local officials

- Zohran Mamdani, mayor of New York City (2026–present)

Labor unions

- United Auto Workers Region 9A
- United Federation of Teachers

Organizations

- Citizen Action of New York
- New York City Democratic Socialists of America
- Stonewall Democratic Club of New York City

Political parties

- Queens Democratic Party
- New York Working Families Party
Rana Abdelhamid

U.S. representatives

- Rashida Tlaib, MI-12 (2019–present)
- Nydia Velázquez, NY-07 (1993–present)

Local officials

- Julie Won, New York City councilmember from the 26th district (2022–present)

==== Fundraising ====
Campaign finance reports as of December 31, 2025
Candidate	Contributions	Loans	Expenditures
Diana Moreno (D)	$324,358.38	$0.00	$288,087.55
Rana Abdelhamid (I)	$185,638.37	$0.00	$184,217.91
Mary Jobaida (I)	$101,336.30	$0.00	$60,875.29
Source: Transparency USA

===== Results =====
2026 New York's 36th State Assembly district special election
Party	Candidate	Votes	%	±%
Democratic	Diana Moreno	3,389	38.80%	▼39.52%
Working Families	Diana Moreno	3,083	35.30%	▲15.17%
Total	Diana Moreno	6,472	74.10%	▼24.35%
Queens For All	Rana Abdelhamid	1,491	17.07%	New
People First	Mary Jobaida	665	7.61%	New
Write-in		106	1.21%	▼0.33%
Total votes		8,734	100.00%	N/A
Democratic hold		Swing	▼55.05%	

==== District 74 ====
2026 New York's 74th State Assembly district special election
- February 3, 2026
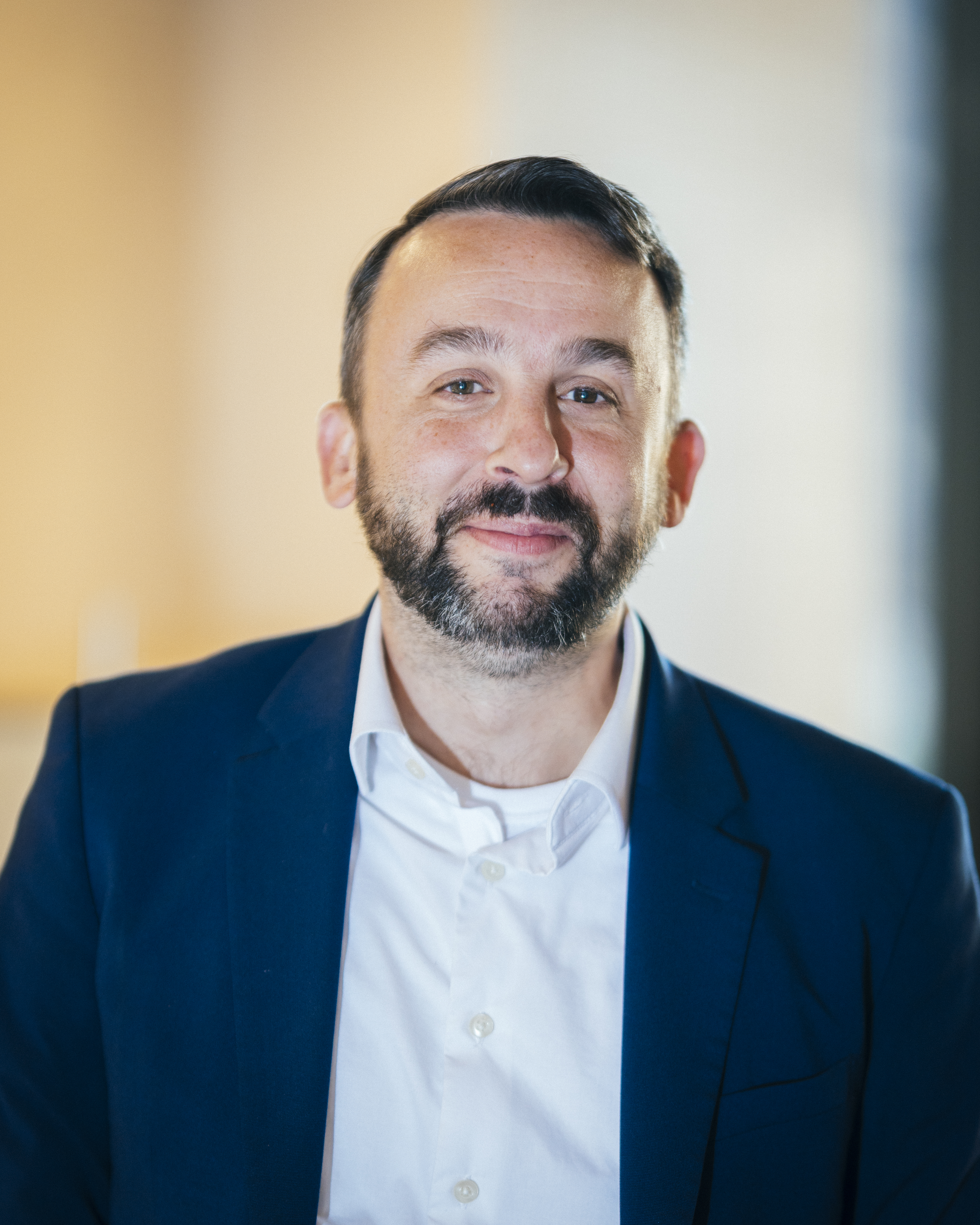

Nominee	Keith Powers	Joseph W. Foley
Party	Democratic	Republican
Alliance		Conservative
Popular vote	4,203	839
Percentage	82.53%	16.47%
Assemblymember before election
Harvey Epstein
Democratic
Elected Assemblymember
Keith Powers
Democratic

In 2024, incumbent Democratic assemblyman Harvey Epstein ran unopposed to win a fourth full term with 98.97% of the vote. On December 4, 2025, Epstein resigned from the State Assembly to become a member of the New York City Council from the 2nd district after winning the election on November 4. On February 3, 2026, Democrat Keith Powers won the special election with 82.53% of the vote against Republican Joseph W. Foley to succeed Epstein. Powers was sworn in on February 4.

===== Candidates =====
====== Declared ======
- Keith Powers (Democratic), former member of the New York City Council from the 2nd district (2018–2025)
- Joseph W. Foley (Republican/Conservative)

====== Withdrawn ======
- Jason C. Murillo (Republican/Conservative)

==== Fundraising ====
Italics indicate a withdrawn candidate.

Campaign finance reports as of December 31, 2025
Candidate	Contributions	Loans	Expenditures
Keith Powers (D)	$70,822.80	$0.00	$74,022.79
Joseph W. Foley (R)	$5,097.39	$0.00	$2,183.56
Jason C. Murillo	$424.31	$0.00	$338.10
Source: Transparency USA

===== Results =====
2026 New York's 74th State Assembly district special election
Party	Candidate	Votes	%	±%
Democratic	Keith Powers	4,203	82.53%	▼6.00%
Republican	Joseph W. Foley	719	14.12%	New
Conservative	Joseph W. Foley	120	2.36%	New
Total	Joseph W. Foley	839	16.47%	New
Write-in		51	1.00%	▼0.03%
Total votes		5,093	100.0%	N/A
Democratic hold		Swing	▼19.08%	

== Predictions ==
Source	Ranking	As of
Sabato's Crystal Ball	Safe D	January 22, 2026
State Navigate	Safe D	November 2, 2026

== Summary by district ==
=== Districts 1–50 ===
District		Incumbent				Candidates (Note: Candidates in the 1st–8th and 12th districts file with the Suffolk County Board of Elections, candidates in the 9th–11th districts file with the State Board of Elections, candidates in the 13th–22nd districts file with the Nassau County Board of Elections, and candidates in the 23rd–50th districts file with the New York City Board of Elections.)
Location	2024 Pres.	Member	Party	First elected	Status	Candidates
1	D+13.2	Tommy John Schiavoni	Democratic	2024	Incumbent re-elected.	▌▌ ✓ Tommy John Schiavoni (Democratic); ▌▌Stephen F. Kiely (Republican)
2	R+22.4	Jodi Giglio	Republican	2020	Incumbent re-elected.	▌▌ ✓ Jodi Giglio (Republican); ▌Michael J. Szika (Democratic); ▌Kimberly Wilder (Voter Options)
3	R+14.8	Joe DeStefano	Republican	2018	Incumbent lost re-election. Democratic gain.	▌▌ ✓ Josh Slaughter (Democratic); ▌▌Joe DeStefano (Republican)
4	D+0.2	Rebecca Kassay	Democratic	2024	Incumbent re-elected.	▌ ✓ Rebecca Kassay (Democratic); ▌▌William A. Sussman (Republican)
5	R+25.6	Douglas M. Smith	Republican	2018 (special)	Incumbent re-elected.	▌▌ ✓ Douglas M. Smith (Republican); ▌Victoria A. Russell (Democratic)
6	D+16.8	Philip Ramos	Democratic	2002	Incumbent re-elected.	▌▌ ✓ Philip Ramos (Democratic); ▌Dennis J. Barravecchio (Republican)
7	R+18.8	Jarett Gandolfo	Republican	2020	Incumbent retiring. Republican hold.	▌▌ ✓ DawnMarie Kuhn (Republican); ▌▌Patricia A. Kopp (Democratic)
8	R+26.0	Michael J. Fitzpatrick	Republican	2002	Incumbent re-elected.	▌▌ ✓ Michael J. Fitzpatrick (Republican); ▌Lynn M. Trupiano-O'Keefe (Democratic)
9	R+27.7	Michael Durso	Republican	2020	Incumbent re-elected.	▌▌ ✓ Michael Durso (Republican); ▌Christopher J. Walis (Democratic)
10	D+4.7	Steve Stern	Democratic	2018 (special)	Incumbent re-elected.	▌ ✓ Steve Stern (Democratic); ▌▌Tiffany L. LeGrow (Republican)
11	D+4.7	Kwani O'Pharrow	Democratic	2024	Incumbent re-elected.	▌ ✓ Kwani O'Pharrow (Democratic); ▌▌Joseph R. Cardinale (Republican)
12	R+6.9	Keith Brown	Republican	2020	Incumbent retiring. Democratic gain.	▌▌ ✓ Craig Herskowitz (Democratic); ▌▌David D. Weber Jr. (Republican)
13	D+5.4	Charles D. Lavine	Democratic	2004	Incumbent re-elected.	▌ ✓ Charles D. Lavine (Democratic); ▌▌Conner Phillip Dunleavy (Republican)
14	R+20.4	David McDonough	Republican	2002 (special)	Incumbent retiring. Republican hold.	▌▌ ✓ Shannon R. Fredericks (Republican); ▌John Brooks (Democratic)
15	R+11.2	Jake Blumencranz	Republican	2022	Incumbent retiring. Republican hold.	▌▌ ✓ Paolo Pironi (Republican); ▌Dean Tarulli (Democratic)
16	R+2.2	Daniel Norber	Republican	2024	Incumbent retiring. Democratic gain.	▌ ✓ Kim Keiserman (Democratic); ▌▌David Hassid (Republican)
17	R+23.8	John Mikulin	Republican	2018 (special)	Incumbent re-elected.	▌▌ ✓ John Mikulin (Republican); ▌Sunita J. Lofters (Democratic)
18	D+61.8	Noah Burroughs	Democratic	2024	Incumbent re-elected.	▌▌ ✓ Noah Burroughs (Democratic); ▌▌Charlene Jackson (Republican)
19	R+17.5	Ed Ra	Republican	2010	Incumbent re-elected.	▌▌ ✓ Ed Ra (Republican); ▌Colleen Connaughton (Democratic)
20	R+22.1	Ari Brown	Republican	2022 (special)	Incumbent re-elected.	▌▌ ✓ Ari Brown (Republican); ▌Meir Fischer (Democratic)
21	D+9.7	Judy Griffin	Democratic	2018; 2022 (lost); 2024	Incumbent re-elected.	▌ ✓ Judy Griffin (Democratic); ▌▌Irene V. Villacci (Republican)
22	D+19.2	Michaelle C. Solages	Democratic	2012	Incumbent re-elected.	▌▌ ✓ Michaelle C. Solages (Democratic); ▌▌Robert G. Inzerillo (Republican)
23	R+13.3	Stacey Pheffer Amato	Democratic	2016	Incumbent retiring. Democratic hold.	▌▌ ✓ Pesach Osina (Democratic); ▌▌▌Thomas P. Sullivan (Republican)
24	D+18.6	David Weprin	Democratic	2010 (special)	Incumbent re-elected.	▌ ✓ David Weprin (Democratic); ▌▌Welson Chang (Republican)
25	D+1.4	Nily Rozic	Democratic	2012	Incumbent re-elected.	▌ ✓ Nily Rozic (Democratic)
26	D+5.2	Edward Braunstein	Democratic	2010	Incumbent re-elected.	▌ ✓ Edward Braunstein (Democratic); ▌Robert J. Speranza (Republican)
27	R+8.2	Sam Berger	Democratic	2023 (special)	Incumbent re-elected.	▌▌ ✓ Sam Berger (Democratic)
28	D+11.7	Andrew Hevesi	Democratic	2005 (special)	Incumbent re-elected.	▌ ✓ Andrew Hevesi (Democratic); ▌Jonathan D. Rinaldi (No Kings); ▌David J. Kemp (4 Our Immigrants)
29	D+67.8	Alicia Hyndman	Democratic	2015 (special)	Incumbent re-elected.	▌▌ ✓ Alicia Hyndman (Democratic)
30	D+10.7	Steven Raga	Democratic	2022	Incumbent retiring. Democratic hold.	▌ ✓ Patrick Martinez (Democratic); ▌▌▌▌Brandon P. Castro (Republican)
31	D+57.0	Khaleel Anderson	Democratic	2020	Incumbent re-elected.	▌▌ ✓ Khaleel Anderson (Democratic)
32	D+65.2	Vivian E. Cook	Democratic	1990	Incumbent retiring. Democratic hold.	▌ ✓ Nathaniel Hezekiah III (Democratic); ▌Paul Nichols (The Answer)
33	D+54.3	Clyde Vanel	Democratic	2016	Incumbent re-elected.	▌ ✓ Clyde Vanel (Democratic); ▌Oster G. Bryan (Working Families)
34	D+21.9	Jessica González-Rojas	Democratic	2020	Incumbent retiring. Democratic hold.	▌▌ ✓ Brian Romero (Democratic)
35	D+14.2	Larinda Hooks	Democratic	2024	Incumbent re-elected.	▌▌ ✓ Larinda Hooks (Democratic)
36	D+49.4	Diana Moreno	Democratic	2026 (special)	Incumbent re-elected.	▌▌ ✓ Diana Moreno (Democratic); ▌Edward Lee (Republican)
37	D+33.4	Claire Valdez	Democratic	2024	Incumbent retiring. Democratic hold.	▌▌ ✓ Samantha Kattan (Democratic)
38	D+13.5	Jenifer Rajkumar	Democratic	2020	Incumbent lost renomination. Democratic hold.	▌▌ ✓ David Orkin (Democratic); ▌▌Ruben D. Cruz II (Republican)
39	D+13.2	Catalina Cruz	Democratic	2018	Incumbent re-elected.	▌▌ ✓ Catalina Cruz (Democratic); ▌▌Ramses S. Frias (Republican)
40	R+2.1	Ron Kim	Democratic	2012	Incumbent re-elected.	▌▌ ✓ Ron Kim (Democratic)
41	R+3.7	Kalman Yeger	Democratic	2024	Incumbent re-elected.	▌▌▌ ✓ Kalman Yeger (Democratic)
42	D+64.3	Rodneyse Bichotte Hermelyn	Democratic	2014	Incumbent re-elected.	▌ ✓ Rodneyse Bichotte Hermelyn (Democratic); ▌Herman G. Hall (Republican)
43	D+66.8	Brian A. Cunningham	Democratic	2022 (special)	Incumbent re-elected.	▌▌ ✓ Brian A. Cunningham (Democratic); ▌Anna Shpilkovskaya (Republican)
44	D+62.9	Robert Carroll	Democratic	2016	Incumbent re-elected.	▌▌ ✓ Robert Carroll (Democratic); ▌▌Glenn P. Nocera (Republican)
45	R+49.8	Michael Novakhov	Republican	2022	Incumbent lost re-election. Democratic gain.	▌▌ ✓ Joey Cohen-Saban (Democratic); ▌▌Michael Novakhov (Republican)
46	R+9.3	Alec Brook-Krasny	Republican	2006; 2015 (resigned); 2022	Incumbent lost re-election. Democratic gain.	▌▌▌ ✓ Chris McCreight (Democratic); ▌▌Alec Brook-Krasny (Republican)
47	R+23.5	William Colton	Democratic	1996	Incumbent re-elected.	▌ ✓ William Colton (Democratic); ▌▌▌John J. Ricottone (Republican)
48	R+70.4	Simcha Eichenstein	Democratic	2018	Incumbent re-elected.	▌▌ ✓ Simcha Eichenstein (Democratic)
49	R+20.0	Lester Chang	Republican	2022	Incumbent lost re-election. Democratic gain.	▌ ✓ Joyce Xiaoqiong Xie (Democratic); ▌▌Lester Chang (Republican)
50	D+49.0	Emily Gallagher	Democratic	2020	Incumbent re-elected.	▌ ✓ Emily Gallagher (Democratic)

=== Districts 51–100 ===
District		Incumbent				Candidates (Note: Candidates in the 94th–95th and 98th–100th districts file with the State Board of Elections, candidates in the 51st–87th districts file with the New York City Board of Elections, candidates in the 88th–93rd districts file with the Westchester County Board of Elections, and candidates in the 96th–97th districts file with the Rockland County Board of Elections.)
Location	2024 Pres.	Member	Party	First elected	Status	Candidates
51	D+45.3	Marcela Mitaynes	Democratic	2020	Incumbent re-elected.	▌▌ ✓ Marcela Mitaynes (Democratic); ▌▌Carla Danielson (Republican)
52	D+82.1	Jo Anne Simon	Democratic	2014	Incumbent re-elected.	▌▌ ✓ Jo Anne Simon (Democratic); ▌▌Brett E. Wynkoop (Republican)
53	D+60.4	Maritza Davila	Democratic	2013 (special)	Incumbent re-elected.	▌ ✓ Maritza Davila (Democratic)
54	D+52.4	Erik Martin Dilan	Democratic	2014	Incumbent lost renomination. Democratic hold.	▌▌ ✓ Christian Celeste Tate (Democratic)
55	D+80.5	Latrice Walker	Democratic	2014	Incumbent re-elected.	▌▌ ✓ Latrice Walker (Democratic)
56	D+80.2	Stefani Zinerman	Democratic	2020	Incumbent lost renomination. Democratic hold.	▌▌ ✓ Eon Tyrell Huntley (Democratic)
57	D+81.3	Phara Souffrant Forrest	Democratic	2020	Incumbent re-elected.	▌▌ ✓ Phara Souffrant Forrest (Democratic); ▌Yolanda Allison (Republican)
58	D+84.9	Monique Chandler-Waterman	Democratic	2022 (special)	Incumbent re-elected.	▌▌ ✓ Monique Chandler-Waterman (Democratic)
59	D+35.6	Jaime Williams	Democratic	2016 (special)	Incumbent re-elected.	▌▌ ✓ Jaime Williams (Democratic); ▌Jibreel Jalloh (Working Families)
60	D+75.1	Nikki Lucas	Democratic	2022 (special)	Incumbent re-elected.	▌ ✓ Nikki Lucas (Democratic); ▌▌Norman H. Ramsay (Republican)
61	D+27.8	Charles Fall	Democratic	2018	Incumbent re-elected.	▌ ✓ Charles Fall (Democratic); ▌Casey Marie O'Connor-Manasia (Republican)
62	R+57.3	Michael Reilly	Republican	2018	Incumbent re-elected.	▌▌ ✓ Michael Reilly (Republican)
63	R+17.4	Sam Pirozzolo	Republican	2022	Incumbent re-elected.	▌▌ ✓ Sam Pirozzolo (Republican); ▌Matthew K. Mobilia (Democratic)
64	R+32.3	Michael Tannousis	Republican	2020	Incumbent re-elected.	▌▌ ✓ Michael Tannousis (Republican); ▌Shpetim Qorraj (Democratic)
65	D+50.9	Grace Lee	Democratic	2022	Incumbent retiring. Democratic hold.	▌ ✓ Illapa Sairitupac (Democratic); ▌Helen Qiu (Republican)
66	D+70.2	Deborah J. Glick	Democratic	1990	Incumbent retiring. Democratic hold.	▌ ✓ David Alfasi Siffert (Democratic)
67	D+69.8	Linda Rosenthal	Democratic	2006 (special)	Incumbent re-elected.	▌▌ ✓ Linda Rosenthal (Democratic)
68	D+64.0	Eddie Gibbs	Democratic	2022 (special)	Incumbent lost renomination. Democratic hold.	▌▌ ✓ Diana Ayala (Democratic)
69	D+76.3	Micah Lasher	Democratic	2024	Incumbent retiring. Democratic hold.	▌▌ ✓ Eli Northrup (Democratic)
70	D+77.1	Jordan Wright	Democratic	2024	Incumbent re-elected.	▌ ✓ Jordan Wright (Democratic)
71	D+67.5	Al Taylor	Democratic	2017 (special)	Incumbent re-elected.	▌▌ ✓ Al Taylor (Democratic)
72	D+42.4	Manny De Los Santos	Democratic	2022 (special)	Incumbent re-elected.	▌▌ ✓ Manny De Los Santos (Democratic)
73	D+52.0	Alex Bores	Democratic	2022	Incumbent retiring. Democratic hold.	▌▌ ✓ Vanessa Tantillo Aronson (Democratic)
74	D+63.8	Keith Powers	Democratic	2026 (special)	Incumbent re-elected.	▌ ✓ Keith Powers (Democratic); ▌▌Veronica I. Gonzalez (Republican)
75	D+65.1	Tony Simone	Democratic	2022	Incumbent re-elected.	▌▌ ✓ Tony Simone (Democratic); ▌▌Cristina Fontanelli (Republican)
76	D+58.6	Rebecca Seawright	Democratic	2014	Incumbent re-elected.	▌▌ ✓ Rebecca Seawright (Democratic); ▌Louis Puliafito (Republican)
77	D+46.0	Landon Dais	Democratic	2024 (special)	Incumbent re-elected.	▌ ✓ Landon Dais (Democratic)
78	D+36.7	George Alvarez	Democratic	2022	Incumbent re-elected.	▌▌ ✓ George Alvarez (Democratic)
79	D+53.5	Chantel Jackson	Democratic	2020	Incumbent re-elected.	▌ ✓ Chantel Jackson (Democratic); ▌Emmanuel A. Findlay Jr. (Conservative)
80	D+31.8	John Zaccaro Jr.	Democratic	2022	Incumbent re-elected.	▌ ✓ John Zaccaro Jr. (Democratic); ▌Denise Smith (Conservative)
81	D+43.8	Jeffrey Dinowitz	Democratic	1994 (special)	Incumbent re-elected.	▌ ✓ Jeffrey Dinowitz (Democratic)
82	D+30.0	Michael Benedetto	Democratic	2004	Incumbent re-elected.	▌ ✓ Michael Benedetto (Democratic); ▌▌▌Irene Gail Guanill (Republican)
83	D+74.3	Carl Heastie	Democratic	2000	Incumbent re-elected.	▌ ✓ Carl Heastie (Democratic); ▌James Washington-Ward (Conservative)
84	D+47.4	Amanda Septimo	Democratic	2020	Incumbent re-elected.	▌▌ ✓ Amanda Septimo (Democratic); ▌Tyreek Goodman (Conservative)
85	D+50.9	Emerita Torres	Democratic	2024	Incumbent re-elected.	▌▌ ✓ Emerita Torres (Democratic)
86	D+34.6	Yudelka Tapia	Democratic	2021 (special)	Incumbent re-elected.	▌ ✓ Yudelka Tapia (Democratic); ▌Maria Diaz (Republican); ▌Shery A. Olivo (Conservative)
87	D+46.8	Karines Reyes	Democratic	2018	Incumbent re-elected.	▌▌ ✓ Karines Reyes (Democratic); ▌Zenobia Merced-Bonilla (Conservative); ▌Zakir Choudhury (People First)
88	D+26.8	Amy Paulin	Democratic	2000	Incumbent re-elected.	▌▌ ✓ Amy Paulin (Democratic)
89	D+50.0	J. Gary Pretlow	Democratic	1992	Incumbent re-elected.	▌ ✓ J. Gary Pretlow (Democratic)
90	D+5.3	Nader Sayegh	Democratic	2018	Incumbent retiring. Democratic hold.	▌ ✓ Frank Jereis (Democratic); ▌John Isaac Nichols (Republican)
91	D+31.6	Steven Otis	Democratic	2012	Incumbent re-elected.	▌▌ ✓ Steven Otis (Democratic)
92	D+33.2	MaryJane Shimsky	Democratic	2022	Incumbent re-elected.	▌▌ ✓ MaryJane Shimsky (Democratic); ▌▌Bob Welch (Republican)
93	D+27.7	Chris Burdick	Democratic	2020	Incumbent re-elected.	▌ ✓ Chris Burdick (Democratic); ▌▌Braille A. Diaz (Republican)
94	R+14.8	Matt Slater	Republican	2022	Incumbent re-elected.	▌▌ ✓ Matt Slater (Republican); ▌Daniel Guzman (Democratic)
95	D+26.2	Dana Levenberg	Democratic	2022	Incumbent re-elected.	▌▌ ✓ Dana Levenberg (Democratic); ▌▌Laurie Ryan (Republican)
96	D+8.8	Patrick Carroll	Democratic	2024	Incumbent re-elected.	▌▌ ✓ Patrick Carroll (Democratic); ▌▌Brett L. Yagel (Republican)
97	R+27.6	Aron Wieder	Democratic	2024	Incumbent re-elected.	▌ ✓ Aron Wieder (Democratic); ▌Robert Bonomolo Jr. (Republican); ▌Abraham Klein (Conservative)
98	R+22.7	Karl A. Brabenec	Republican	2014	Incumbent re-elected.	▌▌ ✓ Karl A. Brabenec (Republican)
99	R+19.8	Chris Eachus	Democratic	2022	Incumbent re-elected.	▌▌ ✓ Chris Eachus (Democratic); ▌▌Richard A. Vargus (Republican)
100	R+0.8	Paula Kay	Democratic	2024	Incumbent re-elected.	▌▌ ✓ Paula Kay (Democratic)

=== Districts 101–150 ===
District		Incumbent				Candidates (Note: Candidates in the 101st–104th, 106th–108th, 110th–118th, 120th–122nd, 124th–127th, 130th–133rd, 139th–140th, 144th–145th, 147th–148th and 150th districts file with the State Board of Elections, candidates in the 105th district file with the Dutchess County Board of Elections, candidates in the 109th district file with the Albany County Board of Elections, candidates in the 119th district file with the Oneida County Board of Elections, candidates in the 123rd district file with the Broome County Board of Elections, candidates in the 128th–129th districts file with the Onondaga County Board of Elections, candidates in the 134th–138th districts file with the Monroe County Board of Elections, and candidates in the 141st–143rd, 146th, and 149th district file with the Erie County Board of Elections.)
Location	2024 Pres.	Member	Party	First elected	Status	Candidates
101	R+12.4	Brian Maher	Republican	2022	Incumbent re-elected.	▌▌ ✓ Brian Maher (Republican)
102	R+19.0	Christopher Tague	Republican	2018 (special)	Incumbent retiring. Republican hold.	▌ ✓ Marc Molinaro (Republican); ▌▌Janet S. Tweed (Democratic)
103	D+31.8	Sarahana Shrestha	Democratic	2022	Incumbent re-elected.	▌▌ ✓ Sarahana Shrestha (Democratic); ▌▌Santos M. Lopez (Republican)
104	D+19.5	Jonathan Jacobson	Democratic	2018	Incumbent re-elected.	▌▌ ✓ Jonathan Jacobson (Democratic)
105	R+12.1	Anil Beephan Jr.	Republican	2022	Incumbent re-elected.	▌▌ ✓ Anil Beephan Jr. (Republican); ▌Brooklyn Talarico (Democratic)
106	D+11.5	Didi Barrett	Democratic	2012 (special)	Incumbent re-elected.	▌ ✓ Didi Barrett (Democratic); ▌▌Gregory A. Campus (Republican)
107	D+3.4	Scott Bendett	Republican	2022	Incumbent lost re-election. Democratic gain.	▌▌ ✓ Chloe Pierce (Democratic); ▌▌Scott Bendett (Republican)
108	D+14.0	John T. McDonald III	Democratic	2012	Incumbent re-elected.	▌ ✓ John T. McDonald III (Democratic); ▌Joseph J. Adamo III (Republican)
109	D+46.0	Gabriella Romero	Democratic	2024	Incumbent re-elected.	▌▌ ✓ Gabriella Romero (Democratic)
110	D+17.1	Phil Steck	Democratic	2012	Incumbent re-elected.	▌▌ ✓ Phil Steck (Democratic); ▌▌Frank A. Mauriello (Republican)
111	D+0.7	Angelo Santabarbara	Democratic	2012	Incumbent re-elected.	▌▌ ✓ Angelo Santabarbara (Democratic); ▌▌Nicholas J. Sokaris (Republican)
112	D+0.2	Mary Beth Walsh	Republican	2016	Incumbent re-elected.	▌▌ ✓ Mary Beth Walsh (Republican); ▌▌Mario L. Fantini (Democratic)
113	D+5.6	Carrie Woerner	Democratic	2014	Incumbent re-elected.	▌ ✓ Carrie Woerner (Democratic); ▌▌▌Allen Caruso (Republican); ▌▌Thomas J. Kenny (Working Families)
114	R+17.5	Matt Simpson	Republican	2020	Incumbent re-elected.	▌▌ ✓ Matt Simpson (Republican); ▌▌John Gunther (Democratic)
115	R+1.3	Michael Cashman	Democratic	2025 (special)	Incumbent re-elected.	▌▌ ✓ Michael Cashman (Democratic)
116	R+14.9	Scott Gray	Republican	2022	Incumbent re-elected.	▌▌ ✓ Scott Gray (Republican)
117	R+38.0	Ken Blankenbush	Republican	2010	Incumbent retiring. Republican hold.	▌▌ ✓ Tammie Nabywaniec (Republican); ▌▌Dennis Gordon (Democratic)
118	R+36.6	Robert Smullen	Republican	2018	Incumbent retiring. Republican hold.	▌▌ ✓ Heather Scribner (Republican); ▌Colleen Maxwell (Democratic)
119	R+14.5	Marianne Buttenschon	Democratic	2018	Incumbent retiring. Republican gain.	▌▌ ✓ Michael Gentile (Republican); ▌▌▌Jonathan E. Lipe (Democratic)
120	R+25.5	William A. Barclay	Republican	2002	Incumbent retiring. Republican hold.	▌▌ ✓ Jim Weatherup (Republican); ▌Timothy C. Allers (Democratic)
121	R+21.3	Joe Angelino	Republican	2020	Incumbent re-elected.	▌▌ ✓ Joe Angelino (Republican); ▌Vicki Davis (Democratic)
122	R+15.2	Brian Miller	Republican	2016	Incumbent re-elected.	▌▌ ✓ Brian Miller (Republican); ▌▌Ihor Semko (Democratic)
123	D+14.2	Donna Lupardo	Democratic	2004	Incumbent retiring. Democratic hold.	▌ ✓ Daniel Norton (Democratic); ▌▌Lynn E. Parker (Republican); ▌Heather L. Micha (Coalition)
124	R+18.9	Christopher S. Friend	Republican	2010	Incumbent re-elected.	▌▌ ✓ Christopher S. Friend (Republican); ▌▌Andrew G. Fagan (Democratic)
125	D+39.5	Anna Kelles	Democratic	2020	Incumbent re-elected.	▌▌ ✓ Anna Kelles (Democratic)
126	D+0.1	John Lemondes Jr.	Republican	2020	Incumbent lost re-election. Democratic gain.	▌▌ ✓ Ian Phillips (Democratic); ▌▌John Lemondes Jr. (Republican)
127	D+9.8	Albert A. Stirpe Jr.	Democratic	2006; 2010 (lost); 2012	Incumbent re-elected.	▌▌ ✓ Albert A. Stirpe Jr. (Democratic); ▌▌Timothy R. Kelly (Republican)
128	D+29.7	Pamela Hunter	Democratic	2015 (special)	Incumbent re-elected.	▌▌ ✓ Pamela Hunter (Democratic); ▌▌Patrick J. Becher (Republican)
129	D+30.3	Bill Magnarelli	Democratic	1998	Incumbent lost renomination. Democratic hold.	▌▌ ✓ Maurice Brown (Democratic); ▌▌Shawn M. Fiato (Republican)
130	R+12.8	Brian Manktelow	Republican	2018	Incumbent retiring. Republican hold.	▌▌ ✓ George Dobbins (Republican); ▌Carl Butch Francis Fitzsimmons (Democratic); ▌Joseph Lamanna (Common Sense)
131	R+10.0	Jeff Gallahan	Republican	2020	Incumbent retiring. Republican hold.	▌▌ ✓ Mark Benjamin (Republican); ▌Phillip Fleming (Democratic)
132	R+23.2	Phil Palmesano	Republican	2010	Incumbent re-elected.	▌▌ ✓ Phil Palmesano (Republican)
133	R+17.1	Andrea Bailey	Republican	2024	Incumbent re-elected.	▌▌ ✓ Andrea Bailey (Republican); ▌Gladys Flores Garcia (Democratic)
134	R+9.3	Josh Jensen	Republican	2020	Incumbent re-elected.	▌▌ ✓ Josh Jensen (Republican); ▌▌Kurtis VanWuyckhuyse (Democratic)
135	D+22.1	Jennifer Lunsford	Democratic	2020	Incumbent re-elected.	▌▌ ✓ Jennifer Lunsford (Democratic); ▌▌Kalinda Washington (Republican)
136	D+37.8	Sarah Clark	Democratic	2020	Incumbent re-elected.	▌▌ ✓ Sarah Clark (Democratic); ▌▌Clianda A. Florence (Republican)
137	D+44.6	Demond Meeks	Democratic	2020	Incumbent re-elected.	▌▌ ✓ Demond Meeks (Democratic); ▌▌David J. Ferris (Republican); ▌Mercedes Vazquez-Simmons (Mercedes Simmons Cares)
138	D+28.9	Harry Bronson	Democratic	2010	Incumbent re-elected.	▌▌ ✓ Harry Bronson (Democratic); ▌Tracy A. DiFlorio (Republican)
139	R+31.4	Stephen Hawley	Republican	2006 (special)	Incumbent re-elected.	▌▌ ✓ Stephen Hawley (Republican); ▌Sarah R. Wolcott (Democratic)
140	D+14.7	William Conrad III	Democratic	2020	Incumbent re-elected.	▌▌ ✓ William Conrad III (Democratic); ▌Mohammed H. Faisal (Republican)
141	D+71.3	Crystal Peoples-Stokes	Democratic	2002	Incumbent retiring. Democratic hold.	▌ ✓ Leah Halton-Pope (Democratic)
142	D+0.1	Patrick B. Burke	Democratic	2018	Incumbent re-elected.	▌▌ ✓ Patrick B. Burke (Democratic); ▌▌Gary A. Dickson (Republican)
143	D+1.0	Patrick Chludzinski	Republican	2024	Incumbent lost re-election. Democratic gain.	▌▌ ✓ Ryan Taughrin (Democratic); ▌▌Patrick Chludzinski (Republican)
144	R+19.9	Paul Bologna	Republican	2024	Incumbent re-elected.	▌▌ ✓ Paul Bologna (Republican); ▌▌Donna L. Dye Sholk (Democratic)
145	R+10.1	Angelo Morinello	Republican	2016	Incumbent retiring. Republican hold.	▌▌ ✓ Becky Wydysh (Republican); ▌Nathan D. McMurray (Democratic)
146	D+20.6	Karen McMahon	Democratic	2018	Incumbent re-elected.	▌ ✓ Karen McMahon (Democratic); ▌▌Terence G. McGuire (Republican)
147	R+28.4	David DiPietro	Republican	2012	Incumbent re-elected.	▌▌ ✓ David DiPietro (Republican)
148	R+37.6	Joe Sempolinski	Republican	2024	Incumbent re-elected.	▌▌ ✓ Joe Sempolinski (Republican)
149	D+19.4	Jonathan Rivera	Democratic	2020	Incumbent retiring. Democratic hold.	▌▌ ✓ Adam Bojak (Democratic); ▌▌Frank M. Bogulski (Republican)
150	R+21.3	Andrew Molitor	Republican	2024	Incumbent re-elected.	▌▌ ✓ Andrew Molitor (Republican); ▌▌Thomas A. Carle (Democratic)

== See also ==
- List of New York State legislatures
