= Leah Halton-Pope =

American politician

Member-elect of the New York State Assembly from the 141st district
- Assuming office January 2027
- Succeeding: Crystal Peoples-Stokes

Personal details
- Party: Democratic

Leah Halton-Pope is an American politician. She is the member-elect for New York's 141st State Assembly district in the 2026 election. Prior to this, she became director of government and community relations at Roswell Park Comprehensive Cancer Center in 2017 and was elected to Buffalo Common Council in 2023.

== Biography ==
Halton-Pope originally worked at the office of New York State Assembly member Crystal Peoples-Stokes as a deputy chief of staff and legislative director. In June 2017, she became director of government and community relations at Roswell Park Comprehensive Cancer Center.

In March 2023, Halton-Pope announced at True Bethel Baptist Church that she would be running in the Ellicott District of Buffalo Common Council to succeed retiring council president Darius Pridgen. She won the primary with 49% of the vote. She received endorsements from both Pridgen and mayor Byron Brown, as well as state senator Tim Kennedy. She won the seat in the general election, defeating a third-party challenger, local pastor Michael Chapman. She and Zeneta B. Everhart were the first women elected to the Common Council in a decade.

On April 8, 2026, Peoples-Stokes announced that she would not seek re-election in the 2026 election. With Peoples-Stokes the only candidate to receive enough signatures to quality for the general election ballot for New York's 141st State Assembly district after the filing deadline, the Democratic Party had the exclusive privilege to select her replacement with a committee, with City & State reporting from internal party sources that Halton-Pope was a possible replacement. On April 12, 2026, the Erie County Democratic Committee named her as the Democratic nominee for the district to replace Crystal Peoples-Stokes. She won the seat unopposed.

She is married to Marc Pope, who served as the chief of staff of her Common Council predecessor.
