= Janet Duprey =

American politician (born 1945)

Member of the New York State Assembly from the 115th district
- In office January 1, 2013 – December 31, 2016
- Preceded by: Claudia Tenney
- Succeeded by: Billy Jones

Member of the New York State Assembly from the 114th district
- In office January 1, 2007 – December 31, 2012
- Preceded by: Chris Ortloff
- Succeeded by: Dan Stec

Personal details
- Born: November 27, 1945 (age 80) Plattsburgh, New York, U.S.
- Party: Republican
- Spouse: Elmer
- Children: two
- Profession: politician
- Website: Official website

Janet L. Duprey (born November 27, 1945) is an American politician from the state of New York. A Republican, Duprey was a member of the New York State Assembly from 2007 to 2016.

== Political career ==
Duprey was first elected to the Assembly on November 7, 2006. She ran uncontested in the November 2008 general election.

She was the 2010 Republican nominee when a potential primary challenger’s petitions were thrown out in New York State Appellate Court based on case-law regarding sufficiency of verbiage describing office being sought. She then faced Rudy Johnson, a former energy analyst and small businessman, in the general election, which she won with 59 percent of the vote. Duprey did not seek re-election in 2016.

== Positions ==
Duprey "had a well-established record as her party’s most socially liberal representative in Albany".

Duprey supports gay and lesbian rights and voted in favor of same sex marriage legislation. In 2013, Duprey was a signatory to an amicus curiae brief submitted to the Supreme Court in support of same-sex marriage in the Hollingsworth v. Perry case.

Duprey was a vocal supporter of Dede Scozzafava during the 2009 special election in New York's 23rd congressional district.

Duprey is pro-choice.

Duprey is a longtime advocate for medical aid in dying.

== Family ==
Duprey and her husband Elmer have two grown children, John and Michelle.

New York State Assembly
Preceded by Chris Ortloff	Member of the New York Assembly from the 114th district 2007–2013	Succeeded by Dan Stec
Preceded by Claudia Tenney	Member of the New York Assembly from the 115th district 2013–2017	Succeeded by Billy Jones
