= New York's 115th State Assembly district =

American legislative district

Assemblymember
Michael Cashman; D–Plattsburgh

New York's 115th State Assembly district is one of the 150 districts in the New York State Assembly. The seat has been represented by Democrat Michael Cashman since 2025, succeeding Billy Jones, who resigned to serve a position at Clinton Community College.

== Geography ==
District 115 is the northernmost district in the state. It encompasses the entirety of Clinton County, Franklin County and the towns of St. Armand, Wilmington, North Elba and Keene in Essex County.

The district lies entirely within New York's 21st congressional district and entirely within New York's 45th State Senate district.

=== 2010s ===
District 115 encompassed the entirety of Clinton County, Franklin County and the towns of Brasher, Hopkinton, Lawrence and Piercefield in St. Lawrence County.

== Recent election results ==
=== 2026 ===
2026 New York State Assembly election, District 115
Party	Candidate	Votes	%
Democratic	Michael Cashman		
Working Families	Michael Cashman		
Total	Michael Cashman (incumbent)		
Write-in			
Total votes			

=== 2025 special ===
The special election will be held on November 4, 2025, the same day as other scheduled statewide elections in New York.

2025 New York State Assembly special election, District 115
Party	Candidate	Votes	%
Democratic	Michael Cashman	18,164	
Working Families	Michael Cashman	1,633	
Total	Michael Cashman	19,797	52.3
Republican	Brent Davison	16,230	
Conservative	Brent Davison	1,813	
Total	Brent Davison	18,043	47.6
Write-in		25	0.1
Total votes		37,865	100.0
Democratic hold			

=== 2024 ===
2024 New York State Assembly election, District 115
Party	Candidate	Votes	%
Democratic	Billy Jones (incumbent)	44,871	99.4
Write-in		275	0.6
Total votes		45,146	100.0
Democratic hold			

=== 2022 ===
2022 New York State Assembly election, District 115
Party	Candidate	Votes	%
Democratic	Billy Jones	21,132	
Broadband Now	Billy Jones	526	
Total	Billy Jones (incumbent)	21,658	61.1
Republican	Stephen Chilton III	10,645	
Conservative	Stephen Chilton III	955	
Total	Stephen Chilton III	11,600	34.9
Write-in		14	0.0
Total votes		33,272	100.0
Democratic hold			

=== 2020 ===
2020 New York State Assembly election, District 115
Party	Candidate	Votes	%
Democratic	Billy Jones	32,265	
Working Families	Billy Jones	6,930	
Independence	Billy Jones	3,895	
Total	Billy Jones (incumbent)	43,090	99.5
Write-in		236	0.5
Total votes		43,326	100.0
Democratic hold			

=== 2018 ===
2018 New York State Assembly election, District 115
Party	Candidate	Votes	%
Democratic	Billy Jones	26,688	
Independence	Billy Jones	2,650	
Working Families	Billy Jones	2,620	
Total	Billy Jones (incumbent)	31,958	99.6
Write-in		123	0.4
Total votes		32,081	100.0
Democratic hold			

=== 2016 ===
2016 New York State Assembly election, District 115
Party	Candidate	Votes	%
Democratic	Billy Jones	23,423	
Working Families	Billy Jones	2,046	
Women's Equality	Billy Jones	503	
Total	Billy Jones	25,972	52.5
Republican	Kevin Mulverhill	21,518	
Independence	Kevin Mulverhill	1,553	
Reform	Kevin Mulverhill	182	
Total	Kevin Mulverhill	23,523	47.5
Write-in		23	0.0
Total votes		49,518	100.0
Democratic gain from Republican			

=== 2014 ===
2014 New York State Assembly election, District 115
Primary election
Party	Candidate	Votes	%
Republican	Janet Duprey (incumbent)	1,896	53.1
Republican	Karen Bisso	1,676	46.9
Write-in		0	0.0
Total votes		3,572	100
General election
Republican	Janet Duprey	15,061	
Independence	Janet Duprey	3,752	
Total	Janet Duprey (incumbent)	18,813	65.3
Conservative	Karen Bisso	9,977	34.6
Write-in		39	0.1
Total votes		28,829	100.0
Republican hold			

=== 2012 ===
2012 New York State Assembly election, District 115
Primary election
Party	Candidate	Votes	%
Republican	Janet Duprey	1,584	49.5
Republican	Karen Bisso	972	30.4
Republican	David Kimmel	642	20.1
Write-in		0	0.0
Total votes		3,198	100
General election
Republican	Janet Duprey	21,246	
Independence	Janet Duprey	3,040	
Total	Janet Duprey	24,286	53.0
Democratic	Timothy Carpenter	11,971	26.1
Conservative	Karen Bisso	9,576	20.9
Write-in		15	0.0
Total votes		45,848	100.0
Republican hold			
