= Mark Benjamin (politician) =

American politician

Member-elect of the New York State Assembly from the 131st district
- Assuming office January 2027
- Succeeding: Jeff Gallahan

Personal details
- Party: Republican

Mark Benjamin is an American politician. A member of the Republican Party, he is the member-elect for the 131st district of the New York State Assembly.
