= New York's 83rd State Assembly district =

American legislative district

Assemblymember
Carl Heastie; D–Williamsbridge

New York's 83rd State Assembly district is one of the 150 districts in the New York State Assembly. It has been represented by Assembly Speaker Carl Heastie since 2001.

== Geography ==
District 83 is in The Bronx. It contains the neighborhoods of Williamsbridge, Wakefield, Edenwald, Eastchester, and Baychester.

== Recent election results ==
=== 2026 ===
2026 New York State Assembly election, District 83
Party	Candidate	Votes	%
Democratic	Carl Heastie (incumbent)		
Conservative	James Washington-Ward		
Write-in			
Total votes			100.0

=== 2024 ===
2024 New York State Assembly election, District 83
Party	Candidate	Votes	%
Democratic	Carl Heastie (incumbent)	30,322	88.4
Republican	Stephanie Liggio	3,300	
Conservative	Stephanie Liggio	634	
Total	Stephanie Liggio	3,934	11.5
Write-in		41	0.1
Total votes		34,297	100.0
Democratic hold			

=== 2022 ===
2022 New York State Assembly election, District 83
Party	Candidate	Votes	%
Democratic	Carl Heastie (incumbent)	18,496	92.6
Republican	Tristann Davis	1,466	7.3
Write-in		15	0.1
Total votes		19,977	100.0
Democratic hold			

=== 2020 ===
2020 New York State Assembly election, District 83
Party	Candidate	Votes	%
Democratic	Carl Heastie (incumbent)	38,151	92.8
Republican	Brenton Richie	1,711	4.2
Conservative	Regina Cartagena	1,219	3.0
Write-in		18	0.1
Total votes		41,099	100.0
Democratic hold			

=== 2018 ===
2018 New York State Assembly election, District 83
Party	Candidate	Votes	%
Democratic	Carl Heastie (incumbent)	28,792	96.7
Republican	Aston Lee	632	2.1
Conservative	Regina Cartagena	365	1.2
Write-in		18	0.1
Total votes		29,789	100.0
Democratic hold			

=== 2016 ===
2016 New York State Assembly election, District 83
Party	Candidate	Votes	%
Democratic	Carl Heastie (incumbent)	32,958	99.9
Write-in		39	0.1
Total votes		32,997	100.0
Democratic hold			

=== 2014 ===
2014 New York State Assembly election, District 83
Party	Candidate	Votes	%
Democratic	Carl Heastie (incumbent)	14,040	96.3
Republican	Benjamin Holloway	409	
Conservative	Benjamin Holloway	131	
Total	Benjamin Holloway	540	3.7
Write-in		6	0.0
Total votes		14,586	100.0
Democratic hold			

=== 2012 ===
2012 New York State Assembly election, District 83
Party	Candidate	Votes	%
Democratic	Carl Heastie	33,868	
Working Families	Carl Heastie	426	
Total	Carl Heastie (incumbent)	34,294	97.3
Republican	David Glover	767	2.2
Green	Trevor Archer	178	0.5
Write-in		4	0.0
Total votes		35,243	100.0
Democratic hold			

=== 2010 ===
2010 New York State Assembly election, District 83
Party	Candidate	Votes	%
Democratic	Carl Heastie	16,519	
Working Families	Carl Heastie	799	
Total	Carl Heastie (incumbent)	17,318	97.9
Conservative	Patrick McManus	277	1.6
Green	Trevor Archer	84	0.5
Write-in		0	0.0
Total votes		17,679	100.0
Democratic hold			
