= Michael Cashman (American politician) =

American politician

Member of the New York State Assembly from the 115th district
- Incumbent
- Assumed office November 13, 2025
- Preceded by: Billy Jones

Personal details
- Born: December 26, 1980 (age 45)
- Party: Democratic
- Education: State University of New York at Plattsburgh
- Website: Campaign website

Michael S. Cashman (born December 26, 1980) is an American politician. He is the winner of the 2025 special election to replace Billy Jones in New York’s 115th Assembly District.

Previously, he served as Plattsburgh town supervisor. He was the youngest supervisor in the town's history.
