= New York's 141st State Assembly district =

American legislative district

Assemblymember
Crystal Peoples-Stokes; D–Buffalo

New York's 141st State Assembly district is one of the 150 districts in the New York State Assembly. It has been represented by Assembly Majority Leader Crystal Peoples-Stokes since 2003. In 2026, she announced that she would not run for re-election.

== Geography ==
District 141 is entirely within Erie County. It contains central and northeastern Buffalo.

== Recent election results ==
=== 2026 ===
2026 New York State Assembly election, District 141
Party	Candidate	Votes	%
Democratic	Leah Halton-Pope		
Write-in			
Total votes			100.0

=== 2024 ===
2024 New York State Assembly election, District 141
Party	Candidate	Votes	%
Democratic	Crystal Peoples-Stokes (incumbent)	35,582	99.2
Write-in		287	0.8
Total votes		35,869	100.0
Democratic hold			

=== 2022 ===
2022 New York State Assembly election, District 141
Party	Candidate	Votes	%
Democratic	Crystal Peoples-Stokes (incumbent)	24,906	99.3
Write-in		172	0.7
Total votes		25,078	100.0
Democratic hold			

=== 2020 ===
2020 New York State Assembly election, District 141
Party	Candidate	Votes	%
Democratic	Crystal Peoples-Stokes (incumbent)	42,628	89.4
Republican	Sean Miles	4,981	10.5
Write-in		52	0.1
Total votes		47,661	100.0
Democratic hold			

=== 2018 ===
2018 New York State Assembly election, District 141
Party	Candidate	Votes	%
Democratic	Crystal Peoples-Stokes (incumbent)	31,310	90.4
Republican	Ross Kostecky	3,308	9.6
Write-in		0	0.0
Total votes		34,618	100.0
Democratic hold			

=== 2016 ===
2016 New York State Assembly election, District 141
Party	Candidate	Votes	%
Democratic	Crystal Peoples-Stokes	39,285	
Working Families	Crystal Peoples-Stokes	1,894	
Total	Crystal Peoples-Stokes (incumbent)	41,179	90.4
Republican	Ross Kostecky	4,376	9.6
Write-in		0	0.0
Total votes		45,555	100.0
Democratic hold			

=== 2014 ===
2014 New York State Assembly election, District 141
Primary election
Party	Candidate	Votes	%
Democratic	Crystal Peoples-Stokes (incumbent)	9,065	62.4
Democratic	Antoine Thompson	4,448	30.6
Democratic	Veronica Nichols	1,015	7.0
Write-in		0	0.0
Total votes		14,528	100
General election
Democratic	Crystal Peoples-Stokes	17,962	
Working Families	Crystal Peoples-Stokes	1,637	
Total	Crystal Peoples-Stokes (incumbent)	19,599	100.0
Write-in		0	0.0
Total votes		19,599	100.0
Democratic hold			

=== 2012 ===
2012 New York State Assembly election, District 141
Party	Candidate	Votes	%
Democratic	Crystal Peoples-Stokes	41,342	
Working Families	Crystal Peoples-Stokes	1,786	
Total	Crystal Peoples-Stokes (incumbent)	43,128	89.8
Republican	Ricky Donovan Sr.	4,173	
Independence	Ricky Donovan Sr.	709	
Total	Ricky Donovan Sr.	4,882	10.2
Write-in		0	0.0
Total votes		48,010	100.0
Democratic hold			
