= Billy Jones (politician) =

American politician

D. Billy Jones

Member of the New York State Assembly from the 115th district
- In office January 1, 2017 – August 29, 2025
- Preceded by: Janet Duprey
- Succeeded by: Michael Cashman

Personal details
- Party: Democratic
- Children: 1
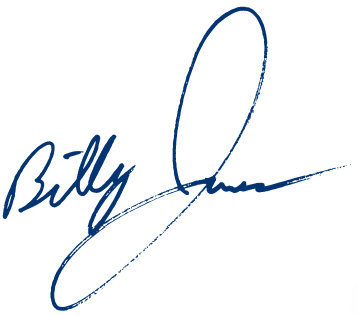
- Signature

D. Billy Jones is an American politician from the state of New York. A Democrat, Jones represented the 115th District in the New York State Assembly from 2016 to 2025. The district is located in the North Country; it includes Clinton County, Franklin County, and a portion of Essex County. Jones has also served as Mayor of Chateaugay, New York and as a member of the Franklin County Legislature.

== Early life and family ==
Jones is a lifelong resident of the North Country. He grew up on a dairy farm. Following high school, Jones began work as a corrections officer with the New York Department of Corrections, where he worked for nearly twenty years. Jones has one daughter.

== Early career ==
First elected to public office in 2009, Jones served as Mayor of Chateaugay, New York for four years and was elected to the Franklin County Legislature in 2010. He served as chairman of the legislature.

== New York State Assembly ==
In 2016, Republican Assemblymember Janet Duprey announced that she would not seek re-election, opening up a potentially competitive seat. Jones, a Democrat, opted to run for that seat. Facing Republican Kevin Mulverhill in the general election, Jones won by 2,179 votes. The 115th Assembly district had not been represented by a Democrat in more than 30 years. Jones was sworn in for his first term on January 1, 2017. In 2018 and 2020, Jones ran unopposed. Republican Stephen Chilton III challenged Jones in 2022, but Jones won the election handily. Jones ran for his fifth term unopposed in 2024.

As a member of the Assembly, Jones chaired the Committee on Local Governments as well as the Task Force on New York-Canada Relations.

In January 2019, Jones voted in favor of a transgender civil rights bill known as the Gender Expression Non-Discrimination Act that was signed into law by Governor Andrew Cuomo. In March 2022, Jones voted against a bill that legalized recreational marijuana use in New York. In June 2022, Jones voted against legislation that raised the minimum age to purchase a semiautomatic weapon from 18 to 21 years of age.

In the fall of 2024, Jones was listed as number 56 on City & State's Upstate Power 100 List, which referred to him as the "Assembly's Ambassador to Canada". In December 2024, a Jones-sponsored bill called the "Death Gamble" for corrections officers was vetoed by Governor Kathy Hochul. The bill would have allowed the beneficiaries of corrections officers "to receive the pension benefits of the deceased if they had retired on the date of their death".

In July 2025, Jones announced that he would resign from the Assembly, and that his resignation would take effect at the end of August. He left office in August 2025. Jones accepted a position as vice president of Clinton Community College.

In late 2025, a Jones-sponsored bill called the New York Land-Home Property Act was signed by Governor Hochul. The law created a process "to surrender a certificate of title to convert a manufactured home into real property, giving New Yorkers the option to finance land and manufactured homes with a mortgage".

Political offices
| Preceded by Janet Duprey | New York Assembly, 115th District; 2017–2025 | Succeeded by Michael Cashman |
