= New York's 82nd State Assembly district =

American legislative district

Assemblymember
Michael Benedetto; D–Pelham Bay

New York's 82nd State Assembly district is one of the 150 districts in the New York State Assembly. It has been represented by Democrat Michael Benedetto since 2005.

== Geography ==
District 82 is in The Bronx. It encompasses Co-op City, Throggs Neck, Westchester Square, City Island, Country Club, and Pelham Bay.

== Recent election results ==
=== 2026 ===
2026 New York State Assembly election, District 82
Primary election
Party	Candidate	Votes	%
Democratic	Michael Benedetto (incumbent)	4,636	62.3
Democratic	Jake Kuhl	1,864	25.0
Democratic	Felix Omozusi	911	12.2
Write-in		39	0.5
Total votes		7,450	100.0
General election
Democratic	Michael Benedetto (incumbent)		
Republican	Irene Guanill		
Conservative	Irene Guanill		
Vote Affordable	Irene Guanill		
Total	Irene Guanill		
Write-in			
Total votes			100.0

=== 2024 ===
2024 New York State Assembly election, District 82
Primary election
Party	Candidate	Votes	%
Democratic	Michael Benedetto (incumbent)	5,868	61.7
Democratic	Jonathan Soto	3,612	38.0
Write-in		27	0.3
Total votes		9,507	100.0
General election
Democratic	Michael Benedetto (incumbent)	29,668	68.8
Republican	Juan de la Cruz	11,957	
Conservative	Juan de la Cruz	1,405	
Total	Juan de la Cruz	13,362	31.0
Write-in		87	0.2
Total votes		43,117	100.0
Democratic hold			

=== 2022 ===
2022 New York State Assembly election, District 82
Primary election
Party	Candidate	Votes	%
Democratic	Michael Benedetto (incumbent)	4,933	56.2
Democratic	Jonathan Soto	3,167	36.1
Democratic	Algernon Quattlebaum	661	7.5
Write-in		21	0.2
Total votes		8,782	100.0
General election
Democratic	Michael Benedetto (incumbent)	19,197	66.2
Republican	John Greaney Jr.	9,080	
Conservative	John Greaney Jr.	695	
Total	John Greaney Jr.	9,775	33.7
Write-in		18	0.1
Total votes		28,990	100.0
Democratic hold			

=== 2020 ===
2020 New York State Assembly election, District 82
Primary election
Party	Candidate	Votes	%
Democratic	Michael Benedetto (incumbent)	13,304	86.8
Democratic	Egidio Sementilli	1,963	12.8
Write-in		63	0.4
Total votes		15,330	100.0
General election
Democratic	Michael Benedetto (incumbent)	38,120	74.3
Republican	John DeStefano	11,744	22.9
Conservative	William Britt Jr.	1,383	2.7
Write-in		84	0.1
Total votes		51,311	100.0
Democratic hold			

=== 2018 ===
2018 New York State Assembly election, District 82
Party	Candidate	Votes	%
Democratic	Michael Benedetto (incumbent)	28,227	81.7
Republican	Elizabeth English	5,509	16.0
Conservative	William Britt Jr.	787	2.2
Write-in		21	0.1
Total votes		34,544	100.0
Democratic hold			

=== 2016 ===
2016 New York State Assembly election, District 82
Party	Candidate	Votes	%
Democratic	Michael Benedetto (incumbent)	31,091	81.0
Republican	Noel Lopez	5,737	14.9
Conservative	William Britt Jr.	1,549	4.0
Write-in		30	0.1
Total votes		38,407	100.0
Democratic hold			

=== 2014 ===
2014 New York State Assembly election, District 82
Party	Candidate	Votes	%
Democratic	Michael Benedetto (incumbent)	15,214	82.2
Republican	Michael Eginton	2,417	13.0
Conservative	William Britt Jr.	868	4.7
Write-in		18	0.1
Total votes		18,517	100.0
Democratic hold			

=== 2012 ===
2012 New York State Assembly election, District 82
Primary election
Party	Candidate	Votes	%
Democratic	Michael Benedetto (incumbent)	3,125	88.2
Democratic	Egidio Sementilli	396	11.2
Write-in		20	0.6
Total votes		3,541	100.0
General election
Democratic	Michael Benedetto	30,687	
Working Families	Michael Benedetto	1,395	
Total	Michael Benedetto (incumbent)	32,082	84.7
Republican	William Britt Jr.	4,840	
Conservative	William Britt Jr.	964	
Total	William Britt Jr.	5,804	15.3
Write-in		15	0.0
Total votes		37,901	100.0
Democratic hold			

=== 2010 ===
2010 New York State Assembly election, District 82
Primary election
Party	Candidate	Votes	%
Democratic	Michael Benedetto (incumbent)	4,325	72.5
Democratic	Herbert Moreira-Brown	831	13.9
Democratic	Rafael Dominguez	799	13.4
Write-in		9	0.2
Total votes		5,964	100.0
General election
Democratic	Michael Benedetto	15,741	
Working Families	Michael Benedetto	1,294	
Total	Michael Benedetto (incumbent)	17,035	73.1
Republican	Michael Rendino	4,901	
Conservative	Michael Rendino	875	
Independence	Michael Rendino	481	
Total	Michael Rendino	6,257	26.9
Write-in		11	0.0
Total votes		23,303	100.0
Democratic hold			

=== 2008 ===
2008 New York State Assembly election, District 82
Party	Candidate	Votes	%
Democratic	Michael Benedetto	28,402	
Working Families	Michael Benedetto	1,217	
Total	Michael Benedetto (incumbent)	29,619	82.9
Republican	Raymond Capone	5,368	
Conservative	Raymond Capone	724	
Total	Raymond Capone	6,092	17.1
Write-in		1	0.0
Total votes		35,712	100.0
Democratic hold			
