= New York's 138th State Assembly district =

American legislative district

Assemblymember
Harry Bronson; D–Rochester

New York's 138th State Assembly district is one of the 150 districts in the New York State Assembly. It has been represented by Harry Bronson since 2011.

== Geography ==
District 138 is in Monroe County. It contains part of the city of Rochester and the towns of Henrietta and Chili.

== Recent election results ==
=== 2026 ===
2026 New York State Assembly election, District 138
Party	Candidate	Votes	%
Democratic	Harry Bronson		
Working Families	Harry Bronson		
Total	Harry Bronson (incumbent)		
Republican	Tracy DiFlorio		
Write-in			
Total votes			

=== 2024 ===
2024 New York State Assembly election, District 138
Party	Candidate	Votes	%
Democratic	Harry Bronson	32,923	
Working Families	Harry Bronson	4,087	
Total	Harry Bronson (incumbent)	37,010	61.3
Republican	Tracy DiFlorio	19,759	
Conservative	Tracy DiFlorio	3,595	
Total	Tracy DiFlorio	23,354	38.7
Write-in		28	0.0
Total votes		60,392	100.0
Democratic hold			

=== 2022 ===
2022 New York State Assembly election, District 137
Party	Candidate	Votes	%
Democratic	Harry Bronson	23,716	
Working Families	Harry Bronson	3,160	
Total	Harry Bronson (incumbent)	26,876	59.5
Republican	Tracy DiFlorio	14,806	
Conservative	Tracy DiFlorio	3,465	
Total	Tracy DiFlorio	18,271	40.5
Write-in		18	0.0
Total votes		45,165	100.0
Democratic hold			

=== 2020 ===
2020 New York State Assembly election, District 138
Primary election
Party	Candidate	Votes	%
Democratic	Harry Bronson (incumbent)	7,525	57.3
Democratic	Alex Yudelson	5,602	42.7
Write-in		7	0.0
Total votes		13,134	100
General election
Democratic	Harry Bronson	33,107	
Working Families	Harry Bronson	3,324	
Independence	Harry Bronson	920	
Total	Harry Bronson (incumbent)	37,351	65.2
Republican	Paul Vazquez	16,104	
Conservative	Paul Vazquez	3,020	
Libertarian	Paul Vazquez	793	
Total	Paul Vazquez	19,917	34.8
Write-in		33	0.0
Total votes		57,301	100.0
Democratic hold			

=== 2018 ===
2018 New York State Assembly election, District 138
Party	Candidate	Votes	%
Democratic	Harry Bronson	26,417	
Working Families	Harry Bronson	1,201	
Independence	Harry Bronson	886	
Women's Equality	Harry Bronson	508	
Total	Harry Bronson (incumbent)	29,012	66.5
Republican	Patsy Iacovangelo	11,740	
Conservative	Patsy Iacovangelo	2,587	
Reform	Patsy Iacovangelo	270	
Total	Patsy Iacovangelo	14,597	33.4
Write-in		31	0.1
Total votes		43,640	100.0
Democratic hold			

=== 2016 ===
2016 New York State Assembly election, District 138
Primary election
Party	Candidate	Votes	%
Democratic	Harry Bronson (incumbent)	2,905	55.1
Democratic	Rachel Barnhart	2,368	44.9
Write-in		0	0.0
Total votes		5,273	100
Republican	Bob Zinck	933	50.1
Republican	Peterson Vazquez	930	49.9
Write-in		0	0.0
Total votes		1,863	100
General election
Democratic	Harry Bronson	28,272	
Working Families	Harry Bronson	1,926	
Independence	Harry Bronson	1,262	
Women's Equality	Harry Bronson	706	
Total	Harry Bronson (incumbent)	32,166	64.1
Republican	Bob Zinck	17,307	
Reform	Bob Zinck	627	
Total	Bob Zinck	17,934	35.7
Write-in		96	0.2
Total votes		50,196	100.0
Democratic hold			

=== 2014 ===
2014 New York State Assembly election, District 138
Party	Candidate	Votes	%
Democratic	Harry Bronson	13,788	
Working Families	Harry Bronson	1,745	
Independence	Harry Bronson	1,060	
Total	Harry Bronson (incumbent)	16,593	56.4
Republican	Peterson Vazquez	9,899	
Conservative	Peterson Vazquez	2,891	
Total	Peterson Vazquez	12,790	43.5
Write-in		26	0.1
Total votes		29,409	100.0
Democratic hold			

=== 2012 ===
2012 New York State Assembly election, District 138
Party	Candidate	Votes	%
Democratic	Harry Bronson	26,395	
Working Families	Harry Bronson	2,162	
Independence	Harry Bronson	1,158	
Total	Harry Bronson (incumbent)	29,715	63.2
Republican	Peterson Vazquez	14,096	
Conservative	Peterson Vazquez	3,146	
Total	Peterson Vazquez	17,242	36.7
Write-in		25	0.1
Total votes		46,982	100.0
Democratic hold			
