= Carl Heastie =

American politician (born 1967)

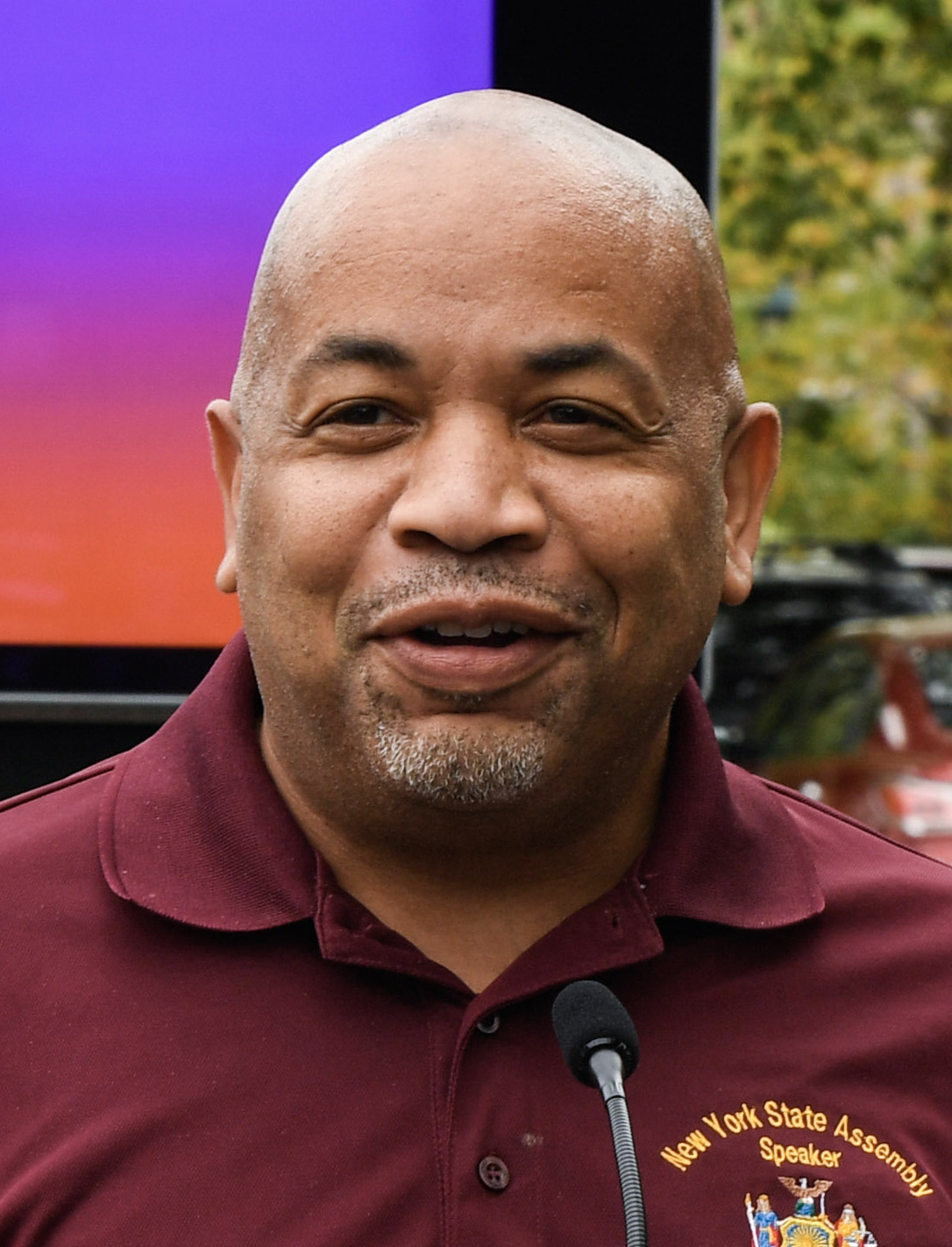
- Heastie in 2020

120th Speaker of the New York State Assembly
- Incumbent
- Assumed office February 3, 2015
- Preceded by: Sheldon Silver

Chair of the Bronx County Democratic Party
- In office November 25, 2008 – February 3, 2015
- Preceded by: Jose Rivera
- Succeeded by: Marcos Crespo

Member of the New York State Assembly from the 83rd district
- Incumbent
- Assumed office January 1, 2001
- Preceded by: Samuel Bea

Personal details
- Born: September 25, 1967 (age 59) New York City, New York, US
- Party: Democratic
- Children: 1
- Education: Stony Brook University (BS); Baruch College (MBA)
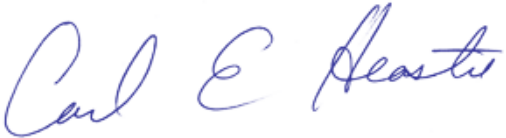
- Signature
- Website: State Assembly website

Carl Edward Heastie (/ˈheɪsti/; born September 25, 1967) is an American politician from New York, who has served as Speaker of the New York State Assembly since 2015. Heastie has served in the New York State Assembly since January 2001.

Heastie is the first African-American to serve as speaker of the Assembly. One of his first New York City appearances after becoming speaker was at Al Sharpton's rally in Harlem, where he told the crowd, "This is a tremendous opportunity for our community, for the first time, to have one of us sit at the table," and added "All of you are going to be sitting at that table with me for the first time".

== Early life and education ==
Born in New York City, Heastie earned a Bachelor of Science degree in applied mathematics and statistics from Stony Brook University in Suffolk County, New York, and a M.B.A. in finance from Baruch College in New York City.

== Career ==
Before his election to the Assembly, Heastie worked as a budget analyst for the New York City comptroller. Heastie has also worked as an adjunct professor at Monroe College.

=== New York State Assembly ===
Heastie was first elected to the New York State Assembly in 2000 and represents the 83rd Assembly District, which covers the Williamsbridge, Wakefield, Edenwald, Eastchester, and Baychester sections of the Northeast Bronx.

Since joining the Assembly, Heastie became one of the lead negotiators for the construction of a new K-8 school in his district. He has also sponsored legislation to require mandatory reporting of alleged child abuse of students in New York City. He became Chair of the Assembly Labor Committee in 2013.

Heastie became Chair of the Bronx Democratic Party in 2008, a post that he relinquished after becoming Assembly Speaker in 2015.

=== Speaker of New York State Assembly ===
In January 2015, Heastie's Assembly colleagues considered him a frontrunner to be elected Speaker, following the arrest of Sheldon Silver on federal corruption charges arising from an investigation led by U.S. attorney Preet Bharara. On February 2, Assembly Democrats voted unanimously for Heastie to become the new Speaker. The full Assembly elected him Speaker of the Assembly the next day.

Heastie is the first African-American to serve as speaker of the Assembly. One of his first New York City appearances after becoming speaker was at Al Sharpton's rally in Harlem, where he told the crowd, "This is a tremendous opportunity for our community, for the first time, to have one of us sit at the table," and added "All of you are going to be sitting at that table with me for the first time".

In April 2015, it was reported that--contrary to a judge's instructions--Heastie had neglected to sell a home that his mother, Helene Heastie, allegedly purchased with money embezzled from a nonprofit charity. After his mother's death, Heastie ceased attempts to sell the home, having been advised by his lawyer that he was no longer obligated to do so; he later sold it for a profit of $200,000. An independent forfeiture law expert consulted by the New York Times asserted that the judge's order was "probably legally unenforceable without a formal forfeiture agreement," which prosecutors had not obtained. In 2015, Heastie's office issued a statement about the incident, saying that "the lessons imparted to the speaker [Heastie]... included owning up to mistakes and taking responsibility."

In September 2025 before the 2025 New York City mayoral election, Heastie expressed reluctance in endorsing the Democratic nominee for mayor and colleague Zohran Mamdani for perceived insufficient efforts by Mamdani to placate Jewish Assembly colleagues concerned by his outspoken criticism of Israel. He has also sought assurances from Mamdani to avoid endorsing primary challengers pushed by the New York City chapter of the Democratic Socialists of America.

== Personal life ==
Heastie has a daughter from a previous marriage.

== See also ==
- List of members of the New York State Assembly

Party political offices
Preceded by José Rivera	Chair of the Bronx County Democratic Party; 2008–2015	Succeeded by Marcos Crespo
Political offices
Preceded by Sheldon Silver	Speaker of the New York State Assembly; 2015–present	Incumbent
