= Michael Benedetto =

American politician (born 1947)

Member of the New York State Assembly from the 82nd district
- Incumbent
- Assumed office January 1, 2005
- Preceded by: Stephen B. Kaufman

Personal details
- Born: June 2, 1947 (age 79) The Bronx, New York, U.S.
- Party: Democratic
- Education: Iona University (BA, MA)
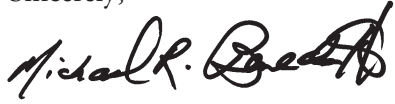
- Signature
- Website: State Assembly website

Michael Benedetto (born June 2, 1947) is a Member of the New York State Assembly representing the 82nd Assembly District, which covers the Co-op City, Throggs Neck, Westchester Square, City Island, Country Club, and Pelham Bay sections of the East Bronx. After a 35-year teaching career at the elementary and secondary school level, he was first elected to the State Assembly in 2004. He is a member of the Democratic Party.

== Early life and education ==
Benedetto was born in the Bronx in 1947. He holds a B.A. in History/Education from Iona College and a M.A. in Social Studies/Education. In 1981, Benedetto co-founded the Bronx Times-Reporter, a weekly newspaper, with John Collazzi.

== Political career ==
=== Running for Office ===
Benedetto first ran for office in 1976, losing to Republican Assemblyman Guy Velella. Two years later, Benedetto ran against Republican State Senator John D. Calandra and lost by 1,121 votes.

In 1980, Benedetto attempted to run again against Calandra. Bronx Democratic leaders, who maintained a non-aggression pact with Calandra, allowed him to run in the Democratic primary. Calandra defeated Benedetto to win the Democratic nomination, and in the general election as the candidate of both the Republican and Democratic parties, Calandra easily defeated Benedetto, who ran on the Liberal Party ticket.

=== New York State Assembly ===
Benedetto was elected to the State Assembly in 2004. Since 2019, he has served as chair of the Education Committee. City & State ranked him 8th on "The most powerful education leaders in New York" and 18th on "The 2021 Bronx Power 100" in 2021.

Many of his legislative priorities relate to children and education. With the support of teachers' unions, he has opposed the expansion of charter schools in New York State.

He has introduced laws aimed at protecting young children from concussion-related developmental problems. Since 2013, he has worked to prohibit tackle football for children. The proposed law is named the John Mackey Youth Football Protection Act after the former NFL star who developed dementia. He has also sponsored a bill that would require youth baseball players to wear helmets with chin straps.

Benedetto supports the repeal of the Hecht-Calandra Act, a state law which established the Specialized High Schools Admissions Test as the only admissions criteria for the city's specialized high schools. He believes that the state should have less control over the city's educational policies.

In 2022, Benedetto negotiated with fellow legislators to pass bills extending Mayoral control of schools and reducing class sizes in New York City. The class size reduction bill was opposed by Mayor Eric Adams as being too costly and by some parents who believed that it would disproportionately benefit schools in richer neighborhoods and reduce access to popular schools.

=== Primary Challenges ===
Since 2010, Benedetto has faced several primary challenges, including two challenges from former Alexandria Ocasio-Cortez staffer Jonathan Soto.

In the 2024 Democratic primary, Soto critiqued Benedetto's role in the Education Committee, saying that there is a lack of accountability, while Benedetto said: "We have allocated and sent more money to the schools of the state of New York more than any other time in the history of this state". New York Focus reported that Benedetto received support from Solidarity PAC, a Pro-Israel group that "resembles" AIPAC. Additionally, he received support from two pro-charter school groups, New Yorkers for a Balanced Albany and Moving New York Families Forward, that are supported by Michael Bloomberg. Benedetto won the 2024 Democratic primary with 62% of the vote.

== See also ==
- List of members of the New York State Assembly
