= Harry Bronson =

American politician

Harry B. Bronson
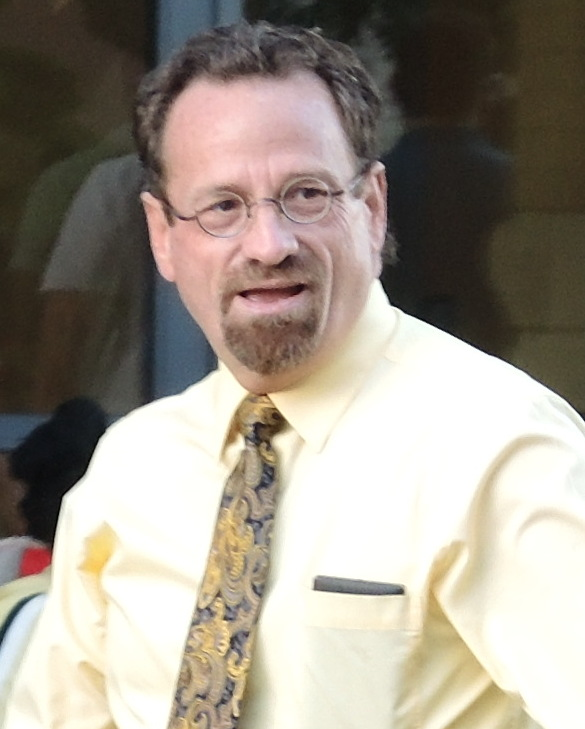
- Harry Bronson in Labor Day Parade 2014

Member of the New York State Assembly from the 138th district
- Incumbent
- Assumed office January 1, 2011
- Preceded by: Susan John

Personal details
- Born: May 22, 1959 (age 67)
- Party: Democratic
- Website: assembly.state.ny.us/mem/Harry-B-Bronson/

Harry B. Bronson (born May 22, 1959) is an attorney and politician from Rochester, New York who serves as a member of the New York State Assembly. A former member of the Monroe County legislature, he was elected to the Assembly in 2010. He is a Democrat. He was the third openly gay man to be elected to and serve in the State Assembly.

Bronson represents the 138th district, which encompasses parts of the city of Rochester as well as the towns and villages of Chili and Henrietta.

== Background ==
Bronson grew up on a 200-acre farm outside Binghamton and became a Rochester resident in 1991. He holds a B.A. from State University of New York at Oswego and a Juris Doctor from University at Buffalo, The State University of New York. He runs a private law practice in Rochester and served as counsel to the state Assembly Labor Committee from 2004 to 2010. From 2001 to 2004, he was a member of the Rochester City Planning Commission and served as Vice Chair in 2004. He also serves as an adjunct professor at Cornell University School of Industrial and Labor Relations in Ithaca.

== Monroe County Legislature ==
Bronson was first elected to the county legislature in 2005, running on the Democratic, Independence and Working Families ballot lines in the 24th district. He outpolled his Republican opponent (also running on the Conservative line) by 67 percent to 33 percent. Upon taking office, he was immediately elected assistant minority leader by the legislature's Democratic caucus, assuming the post of minority leader in October 2007. He sought re-election in 2009 and, running on the Democratic and Working Families lines, won with 65% of the vote.

== NYS Assembly ==
Within a week of Susan John announcing in January 2010 that she would not seek an eleventh term in the assembly, Bronson declared his candidacy for the newly open 131st district seat. He won the endorsement of the Monroe County Democratic party as well as organized labor. He faced two primary opponents, both members of the Rochester school board. In the primary election held on September 14, 2010, he gained 40 percent of the vote and won by a margin of 244 votes (6.0%).

In the general election held on November 2, Bronson (also running on the Working Families Party line) polled 16,318 votes, defeating his Republican opponent by 55% to 45%.

== Personal life ==
Bronson is openly gay. He is the first openly LGBT member of the New York legislature from upstate New York.

Bronson was the co-owner of Equal=Grounds, a coffeehouse in the South Wedge neighborhood of Rochester, with his husband John White-Bronson before selling the business in December 2023.

Political offices
Preceded by Kevin B. Murray	Monroe County Legislator, 24th district January 1, 2006 – December 31, 2010	Succeeded by Joshua P. Bauroth
Party political offices
Preceded by Carla M. Palumbo	Minority Leader, Monroe County Legislature; October 9, 2007 – November 19, 2010	Succeeded by Edward M. "Ted" O'Brien
New York State Assembly
Preceded by Susan V. John	New York State Assembly, 131st district January 1, 2011 – December 31, 2012	Succeeded by Brian M. Kolb
Preceded by John D. Ceretto	New York State Assembly, 138th district January 1, 2013 – present	Incumbent
