= Crystal Peoples-Stokes =

American politician (born 1951)

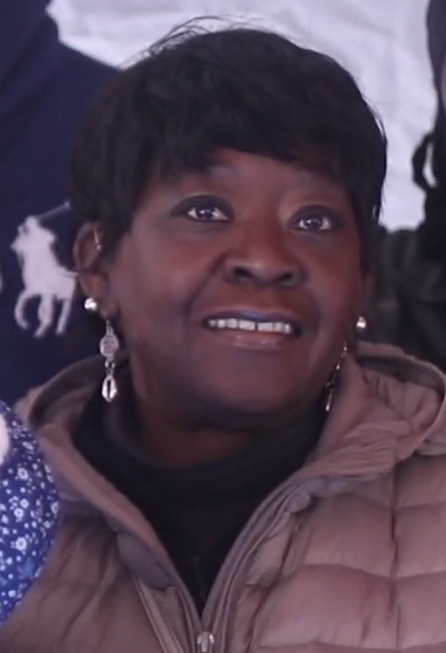

Majority Leader of the New York State Assembly
- Incumbent
- Assumed office December 17, 2018
- Preceded by: Joseph Morelle

Member of the New York State Assembly from the 141st district
- Incumbent
- Assumed office January 1, 2003
- Preceded by: Arthur Eve

Personal details
- Born: December 22, 1951 (age 74) Buffalo, New York, U.S.
- Party: Democratic
- Children: 1
- Education: Buffalo State College (BS, MS)
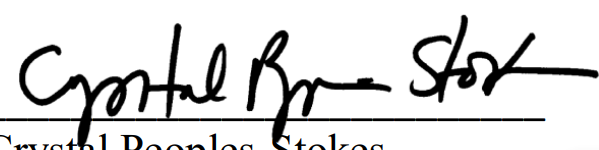
- Signature
- Website: Assembly website

Crystal Davis Peoples-Stokes (born December 22, 1951) is an American politician representing Assembly District 141, which includes the city of Buffalo within Erie County, New York. She is currently the majority leader of the New York State Assembly.

== Education ==
Peoples-Stokes attended Buffalo State College, where she earned her B.S. degree in elementary education and master's degree in student personnel administration.

== Career ==
She worked as a member of the Erie County Legislature representing the 7th District from 1993 to 2002.

In 2000, Peoples-Stokes, a member of Grassroots and the majority leader of the Erie County Legislature, ran against incumbent assemblyman Arthur O. Eve. The race was described by The New York Times as the toughest election contest of Eve's political career. Peoples-Stokes's Democratic primary election challenge was almost successful, and it was credited with energizing minority voters to elect Byron Brown as a New York State Senator.

Peoples-Stokes was elected to the State Assembly in November 2002, after Eve's retirement. She ran uncontested in the November 2008 and November 2010 general elections.

On December 17, 2018, Peoples-Stokes was appointed Majority Leader of the New York State Assembly, becoming the first woman and first African American to serve in the role.

In the 2020 presidential election, People-Stokes served as an alternate elector, replacing Lovely A. Warren.

== Personal life ==
Peoples-Stokes lives in Buffalo, New York, with her daughter Rashaun and grandson Kaleb Malik.

New York State Assembly
Preceded by Arthur Eve	Member of the New York Assembly from the 141st district 2003–present	Incumbent
Preceded by Joe Morelle	Majority Leader of the New York Assembly; 2018–present	Incumbent
