= Clinton Community College (New York) =

Public college in Plattsburgh, New York, US

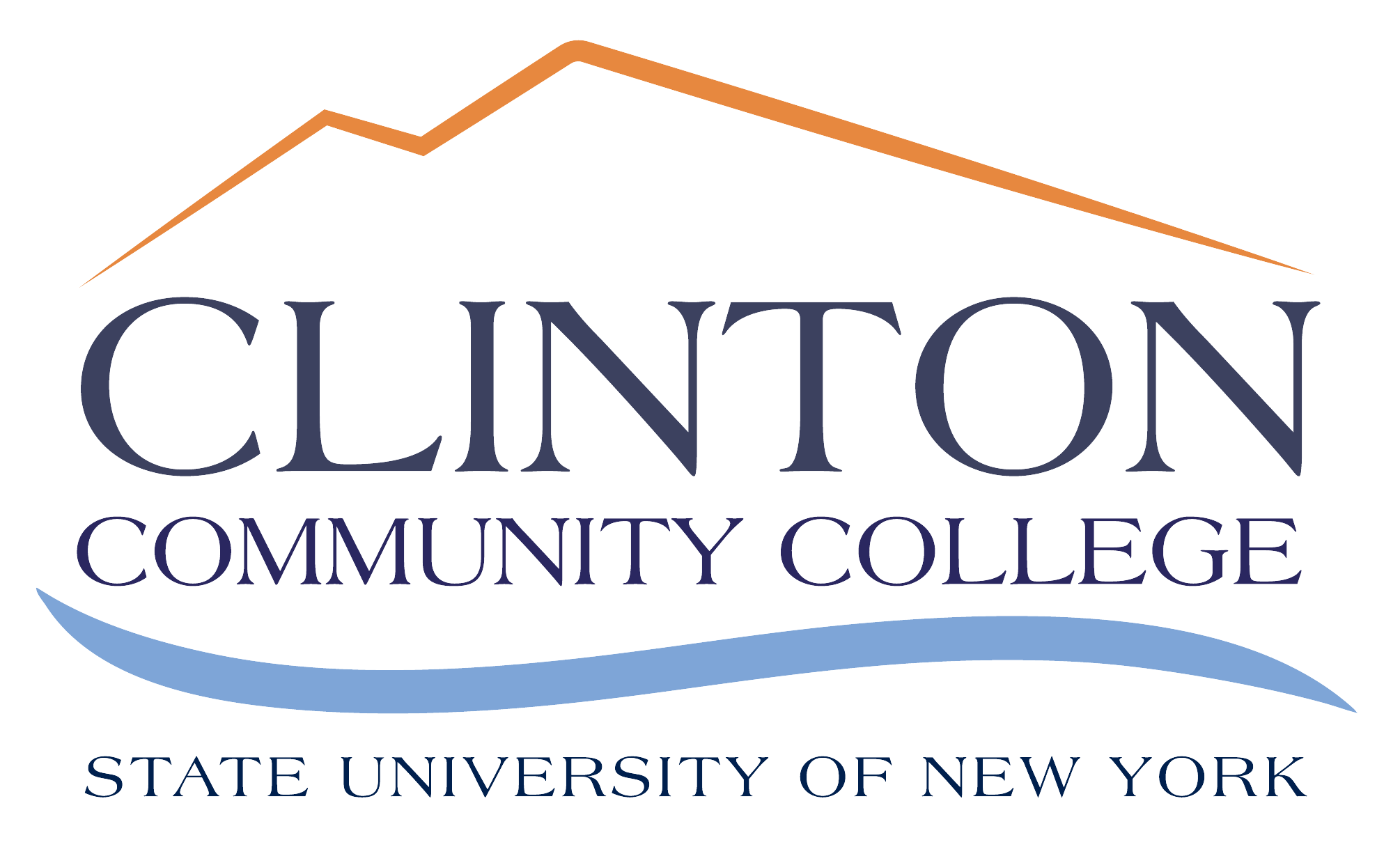
- Type: Public community college
- Established: 1966; 60 years ago
- Parent institution: State University of New York
- President: Ken Knelly
- Undergraduates: 1,171 (fall 2025)
- Location: 46 Beekman Street, Plattsburgh, New York, United States, United States; 44.69722087815774°N 73.46583089887912°W
- Colors: Blue, White, Orange
- Nickname: Cougars
- Sporting affiliations: National Junior College Athletic Association, Region III Division III
- Mascot: Cougar
- Website: clinton.edu

Clinton Community College (CCC) is a public community college in Plattsburgh, in Clinton County, New York. It is part of the State University of New York (SUNY). CCC is a residential campus that has 1,171 undergraduates with an average class size of 15. Clinton is located an hour drive south of Montreal, Quebec and across Lake Champlain from Burlington, Vermont. The college officially opened to 189 full-time students in 1969 and has grown since. Clinton is also home to the Institute for Advanced Manufacturing, a 30,000 square foot facility designed and equipped to serve as a regional hub for manufacturing education.

== History ==
From its inception, Clinton Community College was situated at Bluff Point, approximately four miles south of the City of Plattsburgh, on forested heights overlooking Lake Champlain.

In August of 2025, the college moved the core of its operations to two buildings on the SUNY Plattsburgh campus. It retained its Institute of Advanced Manufacturing and the William B. Forrence Health, Physical Education and Recreation Building.

== Buildings ==
Clinton Community College is situated across three main locations:

1. George Moore Building - 46 Beekman Street in Plattsburgh
  - Administrative Building - 133 Court Street in Plattsburgh
2. Institute for Advanced Manufacturing - 53 Clinton Point Drive in Plattsburgh
  - William B. Forrence Health, Physical Education and Recreation Building - 136 Clinton Point Drive in Plattsburgh
3. Champlain Valley Physicians Hospital at University of Vermont Health - 75 Beekman Street in Plattsburgh

== Athletics ==
The William B. Forrence Health, Physical Education, and Recreation Building is the home of Cougar Athletics.

The college belongs to the NJCAA. It has teams for men's soccer and basketball as well as men's and women's cross country.
