= New York State Assembly =

Lower house of the New York State Legislature

Coordinates: 42°39′10.3″N 73°45′25.8″W

- New York State Legislature
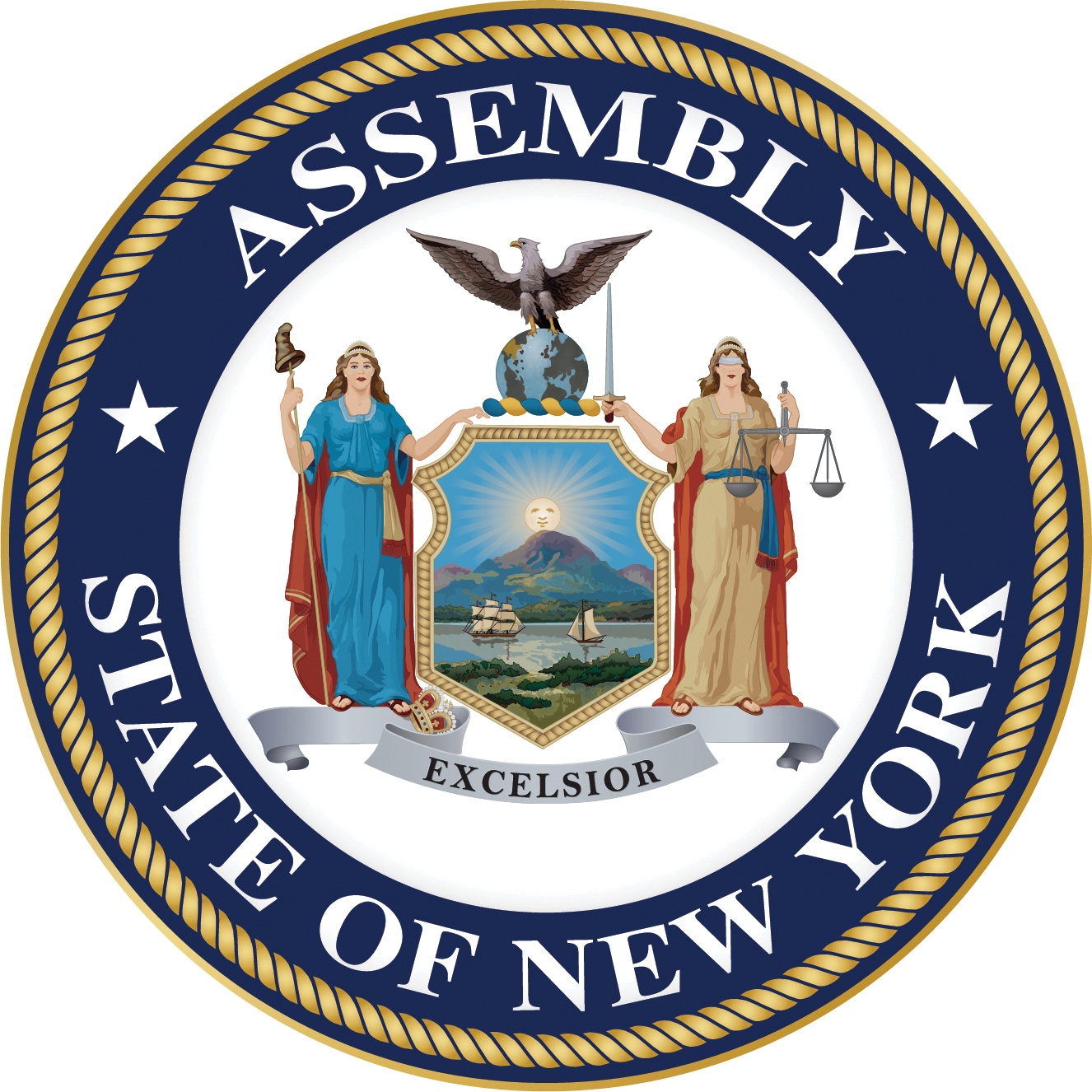

Type
- Type: Lower house
- Term limits: None

History
- New session started: January 8, 2025

Leadership
- Speaker: Carl Heastie (D) since February 3, 2015
- Speaker pro tempore: Pamela Hunter (D) since January 9, 2025
- Majority Leader: Crystal Peoples-Stokes (D) since December 17, 2018
- Minority Leader: Ed Ra (R) since February 9, 2026

Structure
- Seats: 150
- Political groups: Majority caucus (103): Democratic; Minority caucus (47): Republican
- Length of term: 2 years
- Authority: Article III, New York Constitution
- Salary: $142,000/year + per diem

Elections
- Last election: November 5, 2024
- Next election: November 3, 2026
- Redistricting: Legislative control

Meeting place
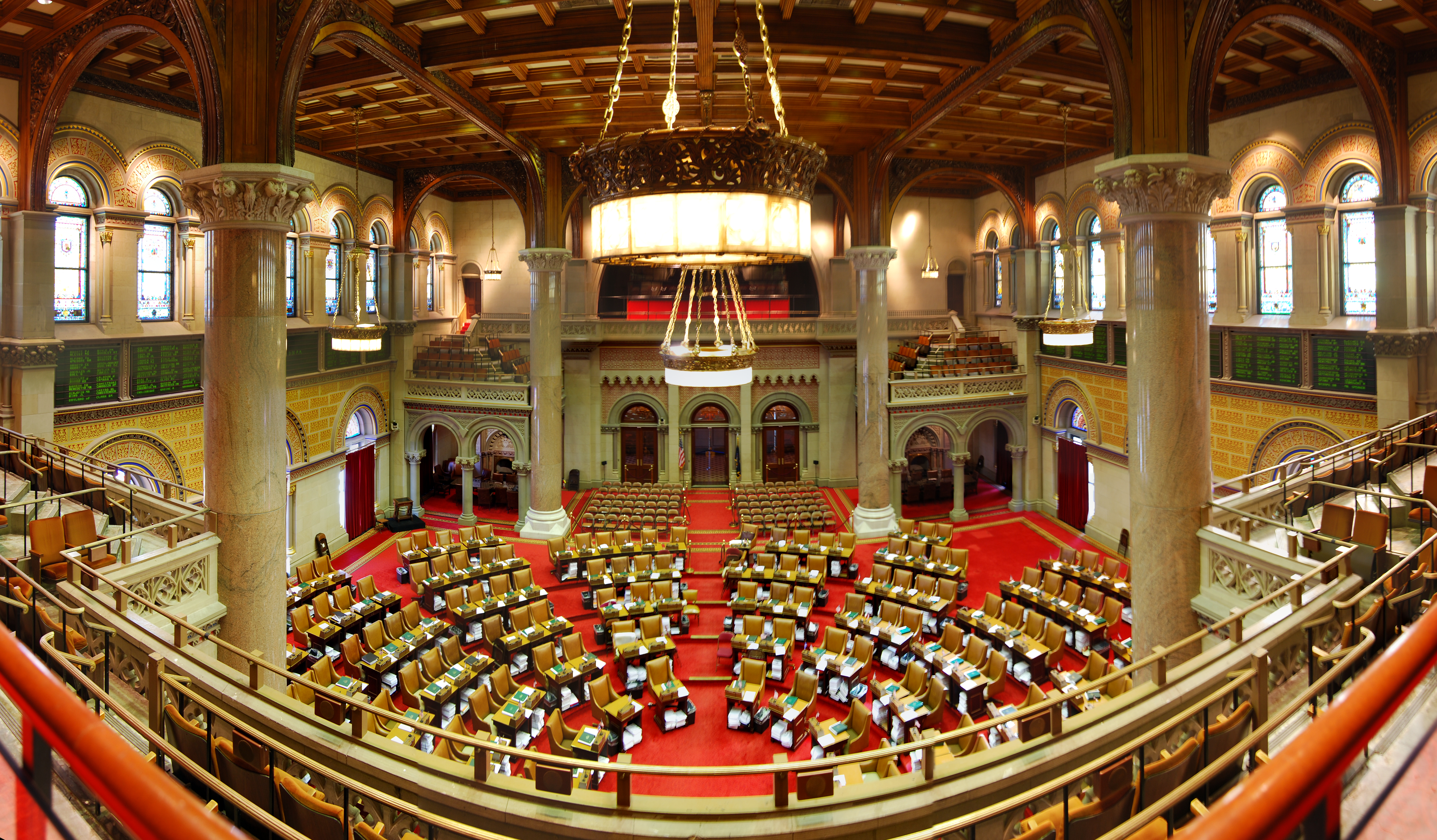
- State Assembly Chamber at New York State Capitol in Albany, New York

Website
- nyassembly.gov

The New York State Assembly is the lower house of the New York State Legislature, with the New York State Senate being the upper house. There are 150 seats in the Assembly. Assembly members serve two-year terms without term limits.

The Assembly convenes at the State Capitol in Albany.

== History ==
The 1777 and subsequent New York State Constitutions originally provided for assemblymen to be elected directly from their respective counties. This meant counties with more than one assembly seat, such as the Chautauqua County, functioned as multi-member districts. Plurality block voting was used. In 1846 transition was made to single-member districts.

== Leadership of the Assembly ==
The speaker of the Assembly presides over the Assembly. The speaker is elected by the majority conference, followed by confirmation of the full Assembly through the passage of an Assembly resolution. In addition to presiding over the body, the speaker also has the chief leadership position, and controls the flow of legislation and committee assignments. The minority leader is elected by party caucus. The majority leader of the Assembly is selected by, and serves, the speaker.

Democrat Carl Heastie of the 83rd Assembly district has served as speaker of the Assembly since February 2015. Crystal Peoples-Stokes of the 141st Assembly district has served as Assembly majority leader since December 2018. Republican Ed Ra of the 19th Assembly district has served as Assembly minority leader since February 9, 2026.

Position	Name	Dist.
Speaker	Carl Heastie	83
Majority leader	Crystal Peoples-Stokes	141
Majority Whip	Rodneyse Bichotte Hermelyn	42
Minority leader	Ed Ra	19
Minority Whip	David DiPietro	147

== Composition by party ==
The Assembly has been controlled by the Democratic Party since 1975.

Affiliation	Party (Shading indicates Majority Conference)					Total	Vacant
Affiliation	Democratic		Republican	Independence	Conservative	Total	Vacant
End 2015–2016 session	104		41	1	1	147	3
Start 2017–2018 session	106		43	1	0	150	0
End 2017–2018 session	102	1 (Note: Asm. Erik Bohen (a registered Democrat who won an April 24, 2018 special election on the Republican Party line) was not a member of any caucus during his Assembly tenure.)	42	1	0	146	4
Start 2019–2020 session	105		44	1	0	150	0
End 2019–2020 session	101		43	1	0	145	5
Start 2021–2022 session	106		43	1	0	150	0
End 2021–2022 session	107		43	0	0	149	1
Start 2023–2024 session	102		48	0	0	150	0
End 2023–2024 session	100		48	0	0	148	2
Start 2025–2026 session	103		47	0	0	150	0
August 29, 2025 (Note: Democrat Billy Jones (District 115) resigned.)	102		47	0	0	149	1
November 4, 2025 (Note: Democrat Michael Cashman was elected to succeed Jones.)	103		47	0	0	150	0
December 3, 2025 (Note: Democrat Harvey Epstein (District 74) resigned after being elected to the New York City Council.)	102		47	0	0	149	1
December 31, 2025 (Note: Democrat Zohran Mamdani (District 36) resigned after being sworn in as Mayor of New York City.)	101		47	0	0	148	2
February 4, 2026 (Note: Democrats Diana Moreno (District 36) and Keith Powers (District 74) were elected to succeed Zohran Mamdani and Harvey Epstein, respectively.)	103		47	0	0	150	0
Latest voting share	68.67%		31.33%				

== Members of the New York State Assembly ==
District	Party	Member	First elected	Counties	Residence
1	Democratic	Tommy John Schiavoni	2024	Suffolk	Sag Harbor
2	Republican	Jodi Giglio	2020	Suffolk	Riverhead
3	Republican	Joe DeStefano	2018	Suffolk	Brookhaven
4	Democratic	Rebecca Kassay	2024	Suffolk	Port Jefferson
5	Republican	Douglas M. Smith	2018 (Note: Elected in a special election)	Suffolk	Holbrook
6	Democratic	Philip Ramos	2002	Suffolk	Brentwood
7	Republican	Jarett Gandolfo	2020	Suffolk	Sayville
8	Republican	Michael J. Fitzpatrick	2002	Suffolk	St. James
9	Republican	Michael Durso	2020	Nassau, Suffolk	Massapequa Park
10	Democratic	Steve Stern	2018	Nassau, Suffolk	Dix Hills
11	Democratic	Kwani O'Pharrow	2024	Nassau, Suffolk	West Babylon
12	Republican	Keith Brown	2020	Suffolk	Northport
13	Democratic	Charles D. Lavine	2004	Nassau	Glen Cove
14	Republican	David McDonough	2002	Nassau	Merrick
15	Republican	Jake Blumencranz	2022	Nassau	Oyster Bay
16	Republican	Daniel Norber	2024	Nassau	Great Neck
17	Republican	John Mikulin	2018	Nassau	Bethpage
18	Democratic	Noah Burroughs	2024	Nassau	Hempstead
19	Republican	Ed Ra	2010	Nassau	Garden City South
20	Republican	Eric "Ari" Brown	2022	Nassau	Cedarhurst
21	Democratic	Judy Griffin	2024	Nassau	Rockville Centre
22	Democratic	Michaelle C. Solages	2012	Nassau	Elmont
23	Democratic	Stacey Pheffer Amato	2016	Queens	Queens (Rockaway)
24	Democratic	David Weprin	2010	Queens	Queens (Hollis)
25	Democratic	Nily Rozic	2012	Queens	Queens (Fresh Meadows)
26	Democratic	Edward Braunstein	2010	Queens	Queens (Bayside)
27	Democratic	Sam Berger	2023	Queens	Queens (Kew Gardens Hills)
28	Democratic	Andrew Hevesi	2005	Queens	Queens (Forest Hills)
29	Democratic	Alicia Hyndman	2015	Queens	Queens (Rosedale)
30	Democratic	Steven Raga	2022	Queens	Queens (Woodside)
31	Democratic	Khaleel Anderson	2020	Queens	Queens (Far Rockaway)
32	Democratic	Vivian E. Cook	1990	Queens	Queens (Jamaica)
33	Democratic	Clyde Vanel	2016	Queens	Queens (Cambria Heights)
34	Democratic	Jessica González-Rojas	2020	Queens	Queens (East Elmhurst)
35	Democratic	Larinda Hooks	2024	Queens	Queens (East Elmhurst)
36	Democratic	Diana Moreno	2026	Queens	Queens (Astoria)
37	Democratic	Claire Valdez	2024	Queens	Queens (Ridgewood)
38	Democratic	Jenifer Rajkumar	2020	Queens	Queens (Woodhaven)
39	Democratic	Catalina Cruz	2018	Queens	Queens (Jackson Heights)
40	Democratic	Ron Kim	2012	Queens	Queens (Flushing)
41	Democratic	Kalman Yeger	2024	Kings (Brooklyn)	Brooklyn (Borough Park)
42	Democratic	Rodneyse Bichotte Hermelyn	2014	Kings (Brooklyn)	Brooklyn (Flatbush)
43	Democratic	Brian A. Cunningham	2022	Kings (Brooklyn)	Brooklyn (Flatbush)
44	Democratic	Robert Carroll	2016	Kings (Brooklyn)	Brooklyn (Windsor Terrace)
45	Republican	Michael Novakhov	2022	Kings (Brooklyn)	Brooklyn (Manhattan Beach)
46	Republican	Alec Brook-Krasny	2022	Kings (Brooklyn)	Brooklyn (Coney Island)
47	Democratic	William Colton	1996	Kings (Brooklyn)	Brooklyn (Bensonhurst)
48	Democratic	Simcha Eichenstein	2018	Kings (Brooklyn)	Brooklyn (Borough Park)
49	Republican	Lester Chang	2022	Kings (Brooklyn)	Brooklyn (Dyker Heights)
50	Democratic	Emily Gallagher	2020	Kings (Brooklyn)	Brooklyn (Greenpoint)
51	Democratic	Marcela Mitaynes	2020	Kings (Brooklyn)	Brooklyn (Sunset Park)
52	Democratic	Jo Anne Simon	2014	Kings (Brooklyn)	Brooklyn (Boerum Hill)
53	Democratic	Maritza Davila	2013	Kings (Brooklyn)	Brooklyn (Bushwick)
54	Democratic	Erik Martin Dilan	2014	Kings (Brooklyn)	Brooklyn (Cypress Hills)
55	Democratic	Latrice Walker	2014	Kings (Brooklyn)	Brooklyn (Brownsville)
56	Democratic	Stefani Zinerman	2020	Kings (Brooklyn)	Brooklyn (Bedford-Stuyvesant)
57	Democratic	Phara Souffrant Forrest	2020	Kings (Brooklyn)	Brooklyn (Fort Greene)
58	Democratic	Monique Chandler-Waterman	2022	Kings (Brooklyn)	Brooklyn (East Flatbush)
59	Democratic	Jaime Williams	2016	Kings (Brooklyn)	Brooklyn (Canarsie)
60	Democratic	Nikki Lucas	2022	Kings (Brooklyn)	Brooklyn (Starret City)
61	Democratic	Charles Fall	2018	New York (Manhattan), Richmond (Staten Island)	Staten Island (Mariners Harbor)
62	Republican	Michael Reilly	2018	Richmond (Staten Island)	Staten Island (Eltingville)
63	Republican	Sam Pirozzolo	2022	Richmond (Staten Island)	Staten Island (Castleton Corners)
64	Republican	Michael Tannousis	2020	Kings (Brooklyn), Richmond (Staten Island)	Staten Island (Great Kills)
65	Democratic	Grace Lee	2022	New York (Manhattan)	Manhattan (Financial District)
66	Democratic	Deborah J. Glick	1990	New York (Manhattan)	Manhattan (Greenwich Village)
67	Democratic	Linda Rosenthal	2006	New York (Manhattan)	Manhattan (Upper West Side)
68	Democratic	Eddie Gibbs	2022	New York (Manhattan)	Manhattan (Harlem)
69	Democratic	Micah Lasher	2024	New York (Manhattan)	Manhattan (Upper West Side)
70	Democratic	Jordan Wright	2024	New York (Manhattan)	Manhattan (Harlem)
71	Democratic	Al Taylor	2017	New York (Manhattan)	Manhattan (Harlem)
72	Democratic	Manny De Los Santos	2022	New York (Manhattan)	Manhattan (Fort George)
73	Democratic	Alex Bores	2022	New York (Manhattan)	Manhattan (Upper East Side)
74	Democratic	Keith Powers	2026	New York (Manhattan)	Manhattan (Stuyvesant Town–Peter Cooper Village)
75	Democratic	Tony Simone	2022	New York (Manhattan)	Manhattan (Hell's Kitchen)
76	Democratic	Rebecca Seawright	2014	New York (Manhattan)	Manhattan (Upper East Side)
77	Democratic	Landon Dais	2024	Bronx	The Bronx (Highbridge)
78	Democratic	George Alvarez	2022	Bronx	The Bronx (Fordham)
79	Democratic	Chantel Jackson	2020	Bronx	The Bronx (Morrisania)
80	Democratic	John Zaccaro Jr.	2022	Bronx	The Bronx (Pelham Parkway)
81	Democratic	Jeffrey Dinowitz	1994	Bronx	The Bronx (Riverdale)
82	Democratic	Michael Benedetto	2004	Bronx	The Bronx (Pelham Bay)
83	Democratic	Carl Heastie	2000	Bronx	The Bronx (Williamsbridge)
84	Democratic	Amanda Septimo	2020	Bronx	The Bronx (South Bronx)
85	Democratic	Emerita Torres	2024	Bronx	The Bronx (South Bronx)
86	Democratic	Yudelka Tapia	2021	Bronx	The Bronx (Fordham)
87	Democratic	Karines Reyes	2018	Bronx	The Bronx (Parkchester)
88	Democratic	Amy Paulin	2000	Westchester	Scarsdale
89	Democratic	J. Gary Pretlow	1992	Westchester	Mount Vernon
90	Democratic	Nader Sayegh	2018	Westchester	Yonkers
91	Democratic	Steven Otis	2012	Westchester	Rye
92	Democratic	MaryJane Shimsky	2022	Westchester	Dobbs Ferry
93	Democratic	Chris Burdick	2020	Westchester	Bedford
94	Republican	Matt Slater	2022	Westchester, Putnam	Yorktown
95	Democratic	Dana Levenberg	2022	Westchester, Putnam	Ossining
96	Democratic	Patrick Carroll	2024	Rockland	Bardonia
97	Democratic	Aron Wieder	2024	Rockland	Spring Valley
98	Republican	Karl A. Brabenec	2014	Orange, Rockland	Deerpark
99	Democratic	Chris Eachus	2022	Orange, Rockland	New Windsor
100	Democratic	Paula Kay	2024	Orange, Sullivan	Rock Hill
101	Republican	Brian Maher	2022	Delaware, Oneida, Orange, Otsego, Sullivan, Ulster	Montgomery
102	Republican	Christopher Tague	2018	Albany, Delaware, Greene, Otsego, Schoharie, Ulster	Schoharie
103	Democratic	Sarahana Shrestha	2022	Dutchess, Ulster	Esopus
104	Democratic	Jonathan Jacobson	2018	Dutchess, Orange, Ulster	Newburgh
105	Republican	Anil Beephan Jr.	2022	Dutchess	East Fishkill
106	Democratic	Didi Barrett	2012	Columbia, Dutchess	Hudson
107	Republican	Scott Bendett	2022	Albany, Columbia, Rensselaer, Washington	Averill Park
108	Democratic	John T. McDonald III	2012	Albany, Rensselaer, Saratoga	Cohoes
109	Democratic	Gabriella Romero	2024	Albany	Albany
110	Democratic	Phillip Steck	2012	Albany, Schenectady	Colonie
111	Democratic	Angelo Santabarbara	2012	Montgomery, Schenectady	Rotterdam
112	Republican	Mary Beth Walsh	2016	Fulton, Saratoga, Schenectady	Burnt Hills
113	Democratic	Carrie Woerner	2014	Saratoga, Warren, Washington	Round Lake
114	Republican	Matt Simpson	2020	Essex, Fulton, Saratoga, Warren, Washington	Horicon
115	Democratic	Michael Cashman	2025	Clinton, Essex, Franklin	Plattsburgh
116	Republican	Scott Gray	2022	Jefferson, St. Lawrence	Watertown
117	Republican	Ken Blankenbush	2010	Jefferson, Lewis, Oneida, St. Lawrence	Black River
118	Republican	Robert Smullen	2018	Fulton, Hamilton, Herkimer, Montgomery, Oneida	Johnstown
119	Democratic	Marianne Buttenschon	2018	Oneida	Marcy
120	Republican	William A. Barclay	2002	Jefferson, Oswego, Cayuga	Pulaski
121	Republican	Joe Angelino	2020	Broome, Chenango, Delaware, Madison, Otsego	Norwich
122	Republican	Brian Miller	2016	Herkimer, Madison, Oneida, Otsego	New Hartford
123	Democratic	Donna Lupardo	2004	Broome	Endwell
124	Republican	Christopher S. Friend	2010	Broome, Chemung, Tioga	Big Flats
125	Democratic	Anna Kelles	2020	Cortland, Tompkins	Ithaca
126	Republican	John Lemondes Jr.	2020	Cayuga, Onondaga	Jamesville
127	Democratic	Albert A. Stirpe Jr.	2012	Madison, Onondaga	North Syracuse
128	Democratic	Pamela Hunter	2015	Onondaga	Syracuse
129	Democratic	William Magnarelli	1998	Onondaga	Syracuse
130	Republican	Brian Manktelow	2018	Monroe, Wayne	Lyons
131	Republican	Jeff Gallahan	2020	Broome, Cayuga, Chenango, Cortland, Madison, Ontario, Seneca	Manchester
132	Republican	Phil Palmesano	2010	Chemung, Schuyler, Seneca, Steuben, Yates	Corning
133	Republican	Andrea Bailey	2024	Livingston, Monroe, Ontario, Steuben, Wyoming	Geneseo
134	Republican	Josh Jensen	2020	Monroe	Greece
135	Democratic	Jennifer Lunsford	2020	Monroe	Perinton
136	Democratic	Sarah Clark	2020	Monroe	Rochester
137	Democratic	Demond Meeks	2020	Monroe	Rochester
138	Democratic	Harry Bronson	2010	Monroe	Rochester
139	Republican	Stephen Hawley	2006	Erie, Genesee, Monroe, Orleans	Batavia
140	Democratic	William Conrad III	2020	Erie, Niagara	Tonawanda
141	Democratic	Crystal Peoples-Stokes	2002	Erie	Buffalo
142	Democratic	Patrick B. Burke	2018	Erie	Buffalo
143	Republican	Patrick Chludzinski	2024	Erie	Cheektowaga
144	Republican	Paul Bologna	2024	Erie, Niagara	Clarence
145	Republican	Angelo Morinello	2016	Erie, Niagara	Niagara Falls
146	Democratic	Karen McMahon	2018	Erie	Williamsville
147	Republican	David DiPietro	2012	Erie, Wyoming	East Aurora
148	Republican	Joe Sempolinski	2024	Allegany, Cattaraugus, Steuben	Canisteo
149	Democratic	Jonathan Rivera	2020	Erie	Buffalo
150	Republican	Andrew Molitor	2024	Erie, Chautauqua	Westfield

== Committees ==
The New York State Assembly has the following committees:

- Aging
- Agriculture
- Alcoholism and Drug Abuse
- Banks
- Children and Families
- Cities
- Codes
- Consumer Affairs and Protection
- Corporations, Authorities and Commissions
- Correction
- Economic Development, Job Creation, Commerce and Industry
- Education
- Election Law
- Energy
- Environmental Conservation
- Ethics and Guidance
- Governmental Employees
- Governmental Operations
- Health
- Higher Education
- Housing
- Insurance
- Judiciary
- Labor
- Libraries and Education Technology
- Local Governments
- Mental Health
- Oversight, Analysis and Investigation
- People with Disabilities
- Racing and Wagering
- Real Property Taxation
- Rules
- Science & Technology
- Small Business
- Social Services
- Tourism, Parks, Arts and Sports Development
- Transportation
- Veterans' Affairs
- Ways and Means

== See also ==
- New York State Capitol
- New York State Legislature
- New York State Senate
- Political party strength in New York
- New York Provincial Congress
