= 202nd New York State Legislature =

New York state legislative session

←	201st	203rd	→
- New York State Capitol (2009)

Overview
- Legislative body: New York State Legislature
- Jurisdiction: New York, United States
- Term: January 1, 2017 – December 31, 2018

Senate
- President: Lt. Gov. Kathy Hochul (D)
- Temporary President: John J. Flanagan (R)
- Party control: Republican

Assembly
- Speaker: Carl Heastie (D)
- Party control: Democratic

Sessions
- 1: January 4 – ?, 2017
- 2: January 3 – ?, 2018

The 202nd New York State Legislature, consisting of the New York State Senate and the New York State Assembly, met from January 4, 2017, to December 31, 2018, during the seventh and eighth years of Andrew Cuomo's governorship, in Albany

== State Senate ==
At the beginning of this Legislature, the Senate had 31 Republicans and 32 Democrats. Dem. Simcha Felder caucused with Republicans. Unsatisfied with their own party's leadership, eight Democrats had formed previously the Independent Democratic Conference which cooperated with the Republicans. In April 2018, the IDC was dissolved and the dissenters returned to the Democratic conference. Subsequently, Rep. Thomas Croci abandoned his seat without resigning, which left the Senate de facto tied.

=== Senators ===
The asterisk (*) denotes members of the previous Legislature who continued in office as members of this Legislature. Jim Tedisco changed from the Assembly to the Senate at the beginning of this Legislature. Assembly members Brian P. Kavanagh, Luis R. Sepúlveda and Shelley Mayer were elected to fill vacancies in the Senate.

Note: For brevity, the chairmanships omit the words "...the Committee on (the)..."

District	Senator	Party	Notes
1st	Kenneth LaValle*	Republican	
2nd	John J. Flanagan*	Republican	re-elected Temporary President
3rd	Thomas Croci*	Republican	
4th	Phil Boyle*	Republican	
5th	Carl L. Marcellino*	Republican	
6th	Kemp Hannon*	Republican	
7th	Elaine Phillips	Republican	
8th	John E. Brooks	Democrat	
9th	Todd Kaminsky*	Democrat	
10th	James Sanders Jr.*	Democrat	
11th	Tony Avella*	Dem. (IDC)	
12th	Michael Gianaris*	Democrat	
13th	Jose Peralta*	Dem. (IDC)	died on November 21, 2018
14th	Leroy Comrie*	Democrat	
15th	Joseph Addabbo Jr.*	Democrat	
16th	Toby Ann Stavisky*	Democrat	
17th	Simcha Felder*	Ind. Dem.	
18th	Martin Malave Dilan*	Democrat	
19th	Roxanne Persaud*	Democrat	
20th	Jesse Hamilton*	Dem. (IDC)	
21st	Kevin Parker*	Democrat	
22nd	Martin Golden*	Republican	
23rd	Diane Savino*	Dem. (IDC)	
24th	Andrew Lanza*	Republican	
25th	Velmanette Montgomery*	Democrat	
26th	Daniel Squadron*	Democrat	resigned on August 11, 2017
26th	Brian P. Kavanagh*	Democrat	on November 7, 2017, elected to fill vacancy
27th	Brad Hoylman*	Democrat	
28th	Liz Krueger*	Democrat	
29th	José M. Serrano*	Democrat	
30th	Bill Perkins*	Democrat	on February 14, 2017, elected to the New York City Council
30th	Brian Benjamin	Democrat	on May 23, 2017, elected to fill vacancy
31st	Marisol Alcantara	Dem. (IDC)	
32nd	Rubén Díaz Sr.*	Democrat	on November 7, 2017, elected to the New York City Council
32nd	Luis R. Sepúlveda*	Democrat	on April 24, 2018, elected to fill vacancy
33rd	Gustavo Rivera*	Democrat	
34th	Jeffrey D. Klein*	Dem. (IDC)	IDC Leader
35th	Andrea Stewart-Cousins*	Democrat	Minority Leader
36th	Jamaal Bailey	Democrat	
37th	George Latimer*	Democrat	on November 7, 2017, elected Westchester County Executive
37th	Shelley Mayer*	Democrat	on April 24, 2018, elected to fill vacancy
38th	David Carlucci*	Dem. (IDC)	
39th	William J. Larkin Jr.*	Republican	
40th	Terrence Murphy*	Republican	
41st	Sue Serino*	Republican	
42nd	John Bonacic*	Republican	
43rd	Kathy Marchione*	Republican	
44th	Neil Breslin*	Democrat	
45th	Betty Little*	Republican	
46th	George A. Amedore Jr.*	Republican	
47th	Joseph Griffo*	Republican	
48th	Patty Ritchie*	Republican	
49th	Jim Tedisco*	Republican	
50th	John A. DeFrancisco*	Republican	
51st	James L. Seward*	Republican	
52nd	Fred Akshar*	Republican	
53rd	David J. Valesky*	Dem. (IDC)	
54th	Pam Helming	Republican	
55th	Rich Funke*	Republican	
56th	Joseph Robach*	Republican	
57th	Catharine Young*	Republican	
58th	Tom O'Mara*	Republican	
59th	Patrick M. Gallivan*	Republican	
60th	Chris Jacobs	Republican	
61st	Michael Ranzenhofer*	Republican	
62nd	Robert Ortt*	Republican	
63rd	Timothy M. Kennedy*	Democrat	

=== Employees ===
- Secretary: ?

== State Assembly ==
=== Assembly members ===
The asterisk (*) denotes members of the previous Legislature who continued in office as members of this Legislature.

Note: For brevity, the chairmanships omit the words "...the Committee on (the)..."

District	Assembly member	Party	Notes
1st	Fred W. Thiele Jr.*	Ind./Dem.	
2nd	Anthony Palumbo*	Republican	
3rd	L. Dean Murray*	Republican	
4th	Steve Englebright*	Democrat	
5th	Al Graf*	Republican	on November 7, 2017, elected to the Suffolk Co. District Court
5th	Douglas M. Smith	Republican	on April 24, 2018, elected to fill vacancy
6th	Philip Ramos*	Democrat	
7th	Andrew Garbarino*	Republican	
8th	Michael J. Fitzpatrick*	Republican	
9th	Joseph Saladino*	Republican	on January 31, 2017, took office as Town Supervisor of Oyster Bay
9th	Christine Pellegrino	Democrat	on May 23, 2017, elected to fill vacancy
10th	Chad Lupinacci*	Republican	on November 7, 2017, elected Town Supervisor of Huntington
10th	Steve Stern	Democrat	on April 24, 2018, elected to fill vacancy
11th	Kimberly Jean-Pierre*	Democrat	
12th	Andrew Raia*	Republican	
13th	Charles D. Lavine*	Democrat	
14th	David McDonough*	Republican	
15th	Michael Montesano*	Republican	
16th	Anthony D'Urso	Democrat	
17th	Thomas McKevitt*	Republican	on November 7, 2017, elected to the Nassau County Legislature
17th	John Mikulin	Republican	on April 24, 2018, elected to fill vacancy
18th	Earlene Hill Hooper*	Democrat	
19th	Ed Ra*	Republican	
20th	Melissa Miller	Republican	
21st	Brian F. Curran*	Republican	
22nd	Michaelle C. Solages*	Democrat	
23rd	Stacey Pheffer Amato	Democrat	
24th	David Weprin*	Democrat	
25th	Nily Rozic*	Democrat	
26th	Edward Braunstein*	Democrat	
27th	Michael Simanowitz*	Democrat	died on September 2, 2017
27th	Daniel Rosenthal	Democrat	on November 7, 2017, elected to fill vacancy
28th	Andrew Hevesi*	Democrat	
29th	Alicia Hyndman*	Democrat	
30th	Brian Barnwell	Democrat	
31st	Michele Titus*	Democrat	
32nd	Vivian E. Cook*	Democrat	
33rd	Clyde Vanel	Democrat	
34th	Michael DenDekker*	Democrat	
35th	Jeffrion L. Aubry*	Democrat	
36th	Aravella Simotas*	Democrat	
37th	Catherine Nolan*	Democrat	
38th	Michael G. Miller*	Democrat	
39th	Francisco Moya*	Democrat	on November 7, 2017, elected to the New York City Council
39th	Ari Espinal	Democrat	on April 24, 2018, elected to fill vacancy
40th	Ron Kim*	Democrat	
41st	Helene Weinstein*	Democrat	Chairwoman of Ways and Means from September 18, 2017
42nd	Rodneyse Bichotte*	Democrat	
43rd	Diana Richardson*	Democrat	
44th	Robert Carroll	Democrat	
45th	Steven Cymbrowitz*	Democrat	
46th	Pamela Harris*	Democrat	resigned on April 2, 2018
47th	William Colton*	Democrat	
48th	Dov Hikind*	Democrat	
49th	Peter J. Abbate Jr.*	Democrat	
50th	Joseph R. Lentol*	Democrat	
51st	Félix W. Ortiz*	Democrat	
52nd	Jo Anne Simon*	Democrat	
53rd	Maritza Davila*	Democrat	
54th	Erik Martin Dilan*	Democrat	
55th	Latrice Walker*	Democrat	
56th	Tremaine Wright	Democrat	
57th	Walter T. Mosley*	Democrat	
58th	N. Nick Perry*	Democrat	
59th	Jaime Williams*	Democrat	
60th	Charles Barron*	Democrat	
61st	Matthew Titone*	Democrat	
62nd	Ronald Castorina*	Republican	
63rd	Michael Cusick*	Democrat	
64th	Nicole Malliotakis*	Republican	
65th	Yuh-Line Niou	Democrat	
66th	Deborah J. Glick*	Democrat	
67th	Linda Rosenthal*	Democrat	
68th	Robert J. Rodriguez*	Democrat	
69th	Daniel J. O'Donnell*	Democrat	
70th	Inez Dickens	Democrat	
71st	Herman D. Farrell Jr.*	Democrat	Chairman of Ways and Means; resigned his seat effective September 5, 2017
71st	Al Taylor	Democrat	on November 7, 2017, elected to fill vacancy
72nd	Carmen De La Rosa	Democrat	
73rd	Dan Quart*	Democrat	
74th	Brian P. Kavanagh*	Democrat	on November 7, 2017, elected to the State Senate
74th	Harvey Epstein	Democrat	on April 24, 2018, elected to fill vacancy
75th	Richard N. Gottfried*	Democrat	
76th	Rebecca Seawright*	Democrat	
77th	Latoya Joyner*	Democrat	
78th	Jose Rivera*	Democrat	
79th	Michael Blake*	Democrat	
80th	Mark Gjonaj*	Democrat	on November 7, 2017, elected to the New York City Council
80th	Nathalia Fernandez	Democrat	on April 24, 2018, elected to fill vacancy
81st	Jeffrey Dinowitz*	Democrat	
82nd	Michael Benedetto*	Democrat	
83rd	Carl Heastie*	Democrat	re-elected Speaker
84th	Carmen E. Arroyo*	Democrat	
85th	Marcos Crespo*	Democrat	
86th	Victor M. Pichardo*	Democrat	
87th	Luis R. Sepúlveda*	Democrat	on April 24, 2018, elected to the State Senate
88th	Amy Paulin*	Democrat	
89th	J. Gary Pretlow*	Democrat	
90th	Shelley Mayer*	Democrat	on April 24, 2018, elected to the State Senate
91st	Steven Otis*	Democrat	
92nd	Thomas J. Abinanti*	Democrat	
93rd	David Buchwald*	Democrat	
94th	Kevin Byrne	Republican	
95th	Sandy Galef*	Democrat	
96th	Kenneth Zebrowski Jr.*	Democrat	
97th	Ellen Jaffee*	Democrat	
98th	Karl A. Brabenec*	Republican	
99th	James Skoufis*	Democrat	
100th	Aileen Gunther*	Democrat	
101st	Brian Miller	Republican	
102nd	Pete Lopez*	Republican	on October 1, 2017, appointed as Regional Administrator of EPA
102nd	Christopher Tague	Republican	on April 24, 2018, elected to fill vacancy
103rd	Kevin A. Cahill*	Democrat	
104th	Frank Skartados*	Democrat	died on April 15, 2018
105th	Kieran Lalor*	Republican	
106th	Didi Barrett*	Democrat	
107th	Steven McLaughlin*	Republican	on November 7, 2017, elected Rensselaer County Executive
107th	Jacob Ashby	Republican	on April 24, 2018, elected to fill vacancy
108th	John T. McDonald III*	Democrat	
109th	Patricia Fahy*	Democrat	
110th	Phillip Steck*	Democrat	
111th	Angelo Santabarbara*	Democrat	
112th	Mary Beth Walsh	Republican	
113th	Carrie Woerner*	Democrat	
114th	Dan Stec*	Republican	
115th	Billy Jones	Democrat	
116th	Addie Jenne*	Democrat	
117th	Ken Blankenbush*	Republican	
118th	Marc W. Butler*	Republican	
119th	Anthony Brindisi*	Democrat	on November 6, 2018, elected to the 116th U.S. Congress
120th	William Barclay*	Republican	
121st	Bill Magee*	Democrat	
122nd	Clifford Crouch*	Republican	
123rd	Donna Lupardo*	Democrat	
124th	Christopher S. Friend*	Republican	
125th	Barbara Lifton*	Democrat	
126th	Gary Finch*	Republican	
127th	Albert A. Stirpe Jr.*	Democrat	
128th	Pamela Hunter*	Democrat	
129th	William Magnarelli*	Democrat	
130th	Bob Oaks*	Republican	
131st	Brian Kolb*	Republican	Minority Leader
132nd	Phil Palmesano*	Republican	
133rd	Joseph Errigo	Republican	
134th	Peter Lawrence*	Republican	
135th	Mark C. Johns*	Republican	
136th	Joseph D. Morelle*	Democrat	Majority Leader until November 13, 2018; on November 6, 2018, elected to the 115th and the 116th U.S. Congress
137th	David F. Gantt*	Democrat	
138th	Harry Bronson*	Democrat	
139th	Stephen Hawley*	Republican	
140th	Robin Schimminger*	Democrat	
141st	Crystal Peoples*	Democrat	Majority Leader from December 17, 2018
142nd	Michael P. Kearns*	Democrat	on November 7, 2017, elected Erie County Clerk
142nd	Erik Bohen	Independent	on April 24, 2018, elected to fill vacancy
143rd	Monica P. Wallace	Democrat	
144th	Michael Norris	Republican	
145th	Angelo Morinello	Republican	
146th	Raymond Walter*	Republican	
147th	David DiPietro*	Republican	
148th	Joseph Giglio*	Republican	
149th	Sean Ryan*	Democrat	
150th	Andy Goodell*	Republican	

=== Employees ===
- Secretary: ?

== Sources ==
- Senate election results at NYS Board of Elections
- Assembly election results at NYS Board of Elections
- 26th Senate D. special election result at NYS Board of Elections
- 30th Senate D. special election result at NYS Board of Elections
- 9th Assembly D. special election at NYS Board of Elections
- 27th and 71st Assembly D. special election at NYS Board of Elections
- 5th, 10th, 17th, 39th, 74th, 80th, 102nd, 107th and 142nd Assembly D.; and 32nd and 37th Senate D. special election results at NYS Board of Elections
