= Douglas M. Smith =

American legislator

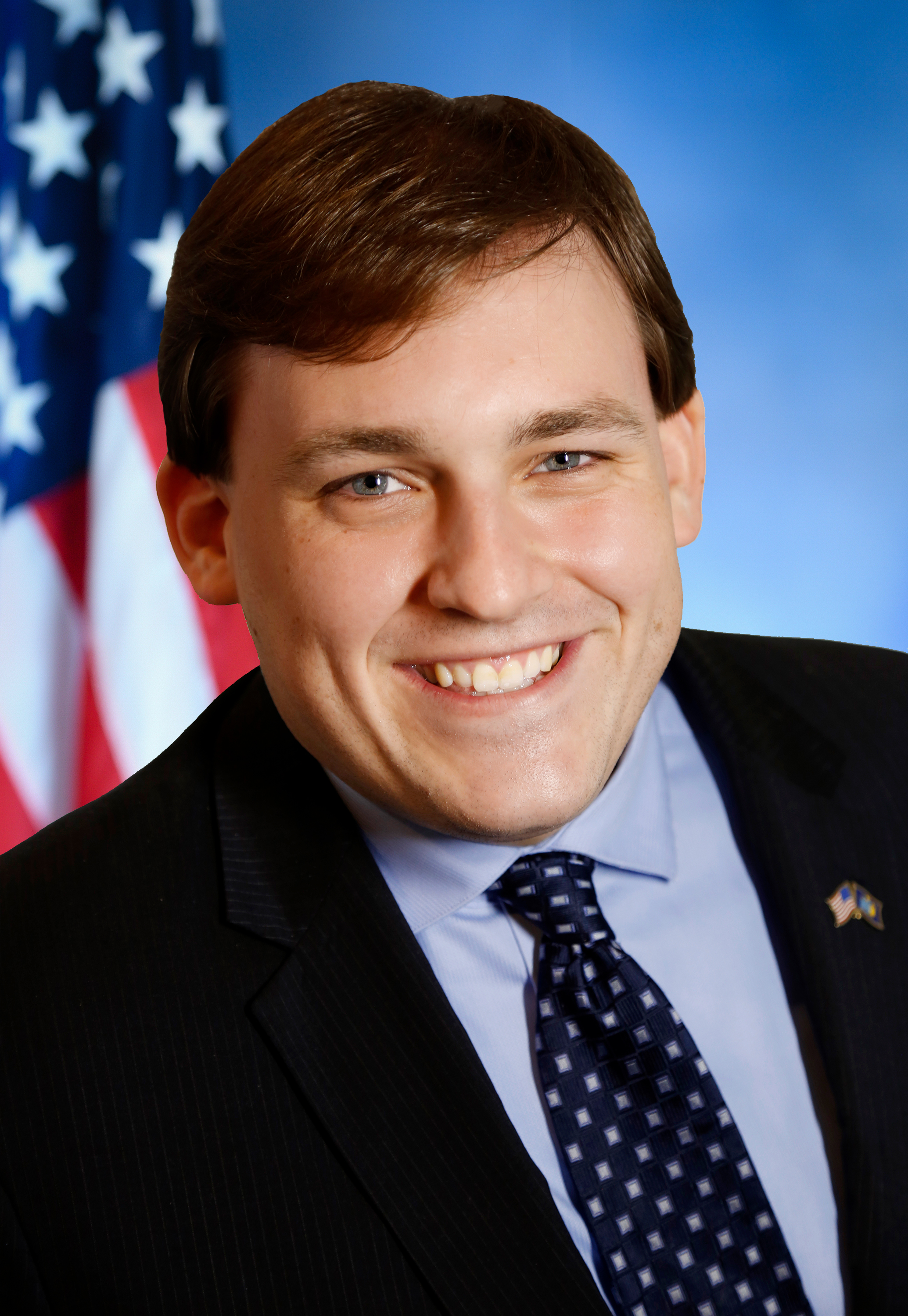
- Smith in 2018

Member of the New York State Assembly from the 5th district
- Incumbent
- Assumed office April 30, 2018
- Preceded by: Alfred C. Graf

Personal details
- Born: August 5, 1990 (age 36)
- Party: Republican
- Spouse: Elizabeth
- Children: Sophie
- Education: St. Joseph's University
- Committees: Rules, Education, Judiciary, Higher Education, Aging
- Website: Campaign website Official website

Douglas M. Smith (born August 5, 1990) is an American legislator serving as the New York State Assemblyman for the 5th district since 2018.

== Life and career ==
Smith was born and raised on Long Island and graduated Sachem High School in Lake Ronkonkoma and went on to earn degrees in Mathematics and Adolescent Education from St. Joseph's University in Patchogue. Smith is a former high school mathematics teacher. Immediately prior to his election to the New York State Assembly, Smith served as Chief of Staff to his predecessor Assemblyman Alfred C. Graf.

He is currently serving in his fifth term in the New York State Assembly representing the 5th Assembly District and is the top republican on the Assembly Education Committee.

On July 1, 2025, Smith was elected Chairman of the Town of Islip Republican Committee, after previously serving as Vice Chairman.

Smith resides in Holbrook, New York, with his wife Elizabeth and their daughter Sophie.

== New York State Assembly ==
Smith represents the 5th Assembly District which includes portions of the towns of Brookhaven and Islip, including Holbrook, Lake Ronkonkoma, Ronkonkoma, Holtsville, Centereach, Selden, Farmingville, Islandia, North Patchogue, Bayport and Stony Brook in Suffolk County on Long Island.

In the New York State Assembly, Smith serves as Ranking Minority Member of the Education Committee, which is responsible for overseeing educational policies and programs affecting prekindergarten, elementary, and secondary education for approximately 3 million children attending both public and nonpublic schools. The Education Committee also participates in the process for selecting persons to serve on the New York State Board of Regents.

He also serves as a member of the New York State Assembly Committees on Rules, Judiciary, Higher Education, Aging, and as a commissioner on the Commission for the Future of the Long Island Power Authority.

He previously served as the Ranking Minority Member on the Committee on Higher Education and has served as a member of the Energy Committee, Banks Committee, Housing Committee, and the Committee on Alcoholism and Drug Abuse.

== Election history ==
On April 24, 2018, Smith was elected to the New York State Assembly in a special election to fill the unexpired term of Assemblyman Alfred C. Graf who resigned from the Assembly on January 1, 2018, upon election as Suffolk County District Court Judge on November 7, 2017. Smith was seated as a Member of the New York State Assembly for the 202nd New York State Legislature on April 30, 2018.

Smith was re-elected during the general election on November 6, 2018, to serve a full term during the 203rd New York State Legislature. He was re-elected again on November 3, 2020, to serve a second full term during the 204th New York State Legislature. On November 8, 2022, Smith was again re-elected to serve a third full term for the 205th New York State Legislature with a two-thirds majority vote. On November 5, 2024, Smith with again re-elected to serve a fourth term for the 206th New York State Legislature, with record number of votes, the highest ever received for a candidate running for Member of Assembly in the 5th District.

Election History
Office	Year	Election	Results
New York State Assembly, District 5	2018	Special	√ Douglas M. Smith (R) 63.17% (3,031 votes) Deborah L. Slinkosky (D) 36.83% (1,767 votes)
New York State Assembly, District 5	2018	General	√ Douglas M. Smith (R) 58.66% (25,075 votes) Timothy L. Hall (D) 41.34% (17,668 votes)
New York State Assembly, District 5	2020	General	√ Douglas M. Smith (R) 61.28% (37,210 votes) Fred Ianacci (D) 38.72% (23,516 votes)
New York State Assembly, District 5	2022	General	√ Douglas M. Smith (R) 67.31% (32,743 votes) James M. Anthony (D) 32.57% (15,842 votes)
New York State Assembly, District 5	2024	General	√ Douglas M. Smith (R) 64.87% (40,503 votes) Michael A. Reynolds (D) 35.06% (21,893 votes)

== Legislative activities ==
In December 2018, Smith introduced "Todd's Law" legislation that would increase the penalties on property stolen that is necessary for the performance of activities of daily living by an incompetent or physically disabled person or a vulnerable elderly person.

Smith has been an outspoken opponent of Common Core in New York. In 2018, he introduced a bill to eliminate common core state standards. Smith has also introduced a bill to establish a scholarship for students who meet certain academic criteria and attend a New York state community college.

In November 2019, it was reported that New York faced a $6 billion budget deficit for the coming year, and that the deficit was expected to jump to $8.5 billion by 2023. In December 2019, Smith introduced a bill to have the New York State Comptroller create a plan to cut government spending by 1% each year.

Following the resignation of former Governor Andrew M. Cuomo, Smith introduced the "Predator Portrait Prevention Act" to require passage of a joint resolution of the state legislature to accept any portrait of a former governor that did not complete any term for which they were elected before being included in the Hall of Governors on the second floor of the New York State Capitol.

In response to the Russian invasion of Ukraine, in May 2022, Smith introduced the "Russia Divestment Act" to require the divestment of public funds in the Russian energy sector, prohibit entities that invest in the Russian energy sector from receiving state contracts, and withdraw investment of public funds in companies doing business with Russia.

== Succession ==
Representing the 5th Assembly District, Douglas M. Smith, Republican (2018–Present) succeeds: Alfred C. Graf, Republican (2011 - 2017); Virginia "Ginny" Fields, Democrat (2004 - 2010); Steve Levy, Democrat (2001 - 2003); Paul E. Harenberg, Democrat (1975 - 2000); Dennis O'Doherty, Republican (1973 - 1974); William L. Burns, Republican (1967 - 1972); Richard DiNapoli, Republican (1966). Prior to 1966, New York State Assembly districts were apportioned differently.

New York State Assembly
Preceded by Alfred C. Graf	Member of the New York Assembly from the 5th District; 2018–present	Incumbent
