= 204th New York State Legislature =

New York state legislative session

←	203rd	205th	→
- New York State Capitol (2009)

Overview
- Legislative body: New York State Legislature
- Jurisdiction: New York, United States
- Term: January 1, 2021 – December 31, 2022

Senate
- Members: Democratic (43); Republican (20)
- President: Lt. Gov. Kathy Hochul (D), until August 24, 2021; Lt. Gov-designate Brian Benjamin (D)
- Temporary President: Andrea Stewart-Cousins (D)
- Party control: Democratic

Assembly
- Members: Democratic (107); Republican (43)
- Speaker: Carl Heastie (D)
- Party control: Democratic

Sessions
- 1: January __, 2021 –

The 204th New York State Legislature consists of the New York State Senate and the New York State Assembly.

It was in session January 1, 2021 until December 31, 2022, during the administrations of Governor Andrew Cuomo and Governor Kathy Hochul.

== State Senate ==
=== Senators ===
District	Senator	Party	First elected	Counties represented
1	Anthony Palumbo	Republican	2020	Suffolk
2	Mario Mattera	Republican	2020	Suffolk
3	Alexis Weik	Republican	2020	Suffolk
4	Phil Boyle	Republican	2012	Suffolk
5	Jim Gaughran	Democratic	2018	Nassau, Suffolk
6	Kevin Thomas	Democratic	2018	Nassau
7	Anna Kaplan	Democratic	2018	Nassau
8	John Brooks	Democratic	2016	Nassau, Suffolk
9	Todd Kaminsky	Democratic	2016*	Nassau
10	James Sanders Jr.	Democratic	2012	Queens
11	John Liu	Democratic	2018	Queens
12	Michael Gianaris	Democratic	2010	Queens
13	Jessica Ramos	Democratic	2018	Queens
14	Leroy Comrie	Democratic	2014	Queens
15	Joseph Addabbo Jr.	Democratic	2008	Queens
16	Toby Ann Stavisky	Democratic	1999*	Queens
17	Simcha Felder	Democratic	2012	Kings (Brooklyn)
18	Julia Salazar	Democratic	2018	Kings
19	Roxanne Persaud	Democratic	2015*	Kings
20	Zellnor Myrie	Democratic	2018	Kings
21	Kevin Parker	Democratic	2002	Kings
22	Andrew Gounardes	Democratic	2018	Kings
23	Diane Savino	Democratic	2004	Kings, Richmond (Staten Island)
24	Andrew Lanza	Republican	2006	Richmond
25	Jabari Brisport	Democratic	2020	Kings
26	Brian P. Kavanagh	Democratic	2017*	Kings, New York (Manhattan)
27	Brad Hoylman	Democratic	2012	New York
28	Liz Krueger	Democratic	2002*	New York
29	Jose M. Serrano	Democratic	2004	New York, Bronx
30	Brian Benjamin	Democratic	2017*	New York
31	Robert Jackson	Democratic	2018	New York
32	Luis R. Sepúlveda	Democratic	2018*	Bronx
33	Gustavo Rivera	Democratic	2010	Bronx
34	Alessandra Biaggi	Democratic	2018	Bronx, Westchester
35	Andrea Stewart-Cousins	Democratic	2006	Westchester
36	Jamaal Bailey	Democratic	2016	Bronx, Westchester
37	Shelley Mayer	Democratic	2018*	Westchester
38	Elijah Reichlin-Melnick	Democratic	2020	Rockland, Westchester
39	James Skoufis	Democratic	2018	Orange, Rockland, Ulster
40	Peter Harckham	Democratic	2018	Dutchess, Putnam, Westchester
41	Sue Serino	Republican	2014	Dutchess, Putnam
42	Mike Martucci	Republican	2020	Delaware, Orange, Sullivan, Ulster
43	Daphne Jordan	Republican	2018	Columbia, Rensselaer, Saratoga, Washington
44	Neil Breslin	Democratic	1996	Albany, Rensselaer
45	Dan Stec	Republican	2020	Clinton, Essex, Franklin, Saint Lawrence, Warren, Washington
46	Michelle Hinchey	Democratic	2020	Albany, Greene, Montgomery, Schenectady, Ulster
47	Joseph Griffo	Republican	2006	Lewis, Oneida, St. Lawrence
48	Patty Ritchie	Republican	2010	Jefferson, Oswego, St. Lawrence
49	Jim Tedisco	Republican	2016	Fulton, Hamilton, Herkimer, Saratoga, Schenectady
50	John Mannion	Democratic	2020	Cayuga, Onondaga
51	Peter Oberacker	Republican	2020	Cayuga, Chenango, Cortland, Delaware, Herkimer, Otsego, Schoharie, Tompkins, Ulster
52	Fred Akshar	Republican	2015*	Broome, Chenango, Delaware, Tioga
53	Rachel May	Democratic	2018	Madison, Oneida, Onondaga
54	Pam Helming	Republican	2016	Cayuga, Monroe, Ontario, Seneca, Tompkins, Wayne
55	Samra Brouk	Democratic	2020	Monroe, Ontario
56	Jeremy Cooney	Democratic	2020	Monroe
57	George Borrello	Republican	2019*	Allegany, Cattaraugus, Chautauqua, Livingston
58	Tom O'Mara	Republican	2010	Chemung, Schuyler, Steuben, Tompkins, Yates
59	Patrick M. Gallivan	Republican	2010	Erie, Livingston, Monroe, Wyoming
60	Sean Ryan	Democratic	2020	Erie
61	Edward Rath III	Republican	2020	Erie, Genesee, Monroe
62	Rob Ortt	Republican	2014	Monroe, Niagara, Orleans
63	Timothy M. Kennedy	Democratic	2010	Erie

* Elected in a special election

== State Assembly ==
=== Assembly members ===
Note: For brevity, the chairmanships omit the words "...the Committee on (the)..."

District	Member	Party	First elected	Counties
1	Fred Thiele	Dem	1995+	Suffolk
2	Jodi Giglio	Rep	2013+	Suffolk
3	Joe DeStefano	Rep	2018	Suffolk
4	Steve Englebright	Dem	1992+	Suffolk
5	Douglas M. Smith	Rep	2018+	Suffolk
6	Philip Ramos	Dem	2002	Suffolk
7	Jarett Gandolfo	Rep	2020	Suffolk
8	Michael J. Fitzpatrick	Rep	2002	Suffolk
9	Michael Durso	Rep	2020	Nassau, Suffolk
10	Steve Stern	Dem	2018+	Suffolk
11	Kimberly Jean-Pierre	Dem	2014	Suffolk
12	Keith P. Brown	Rep	2020	Suffolk
13	Charles D. Lavine	Dem	2004	Nassau
14	David McDonough	Rep	2002+	Nassau
15	Michael Montesano	Rep	2010+	Nassau
16	Gina Sillitti	Dem	2020	Nassau
17	John Mikulin	Rep	2018+	Nassau
18	Taylor Raynor	Dem	2018	Nassau
19	Ed Ra	Rep	2010	Nassau
20	Melissa Miller	Rep	2016	Nassau
21	Judy Griffin	Dem	2018	Nassau
22	Michaelle C. Solages	Dem	2012	Nassau
23	Stacey Pheffer Amato	Dem	2016	Queens
24	David Weprin	Dem	2010+	Queens
25	Nily Rozic	Dem	2012	Queens
26	Edward Braunstein	Dem	2010	Queens
27	Daniel Rosenthal	Dem	2017+	Queens
28	Andrew Hevesi	Dem	2005+	Queens
29	Alicia Hyndman	Dem	2015+	Queens
30	Brian Barnwell	Dem	2016	Queens
31	Khaleel Anderson	Dem	2020	Queens
32	Vivian E. Cook	Dem	1990	Queens
33	Clyde Vanel	Dem	2016+	Queens
34	Jessica González-Rojas	Dem	2020	Queens
35	Jeffrion L. Aubry	Dem	1992+	Queens
36	Zohran Mamdani	Dem	2010	Queens
37	Catherine Nolan	Dem	1984	Queens
38	Jenifer Rajkumar	Dem	2020	Queens
39	Catalina Cruz	Dem	2018	Queens
40	Ron Kim	Dem	2012	Queens
41	Helene Weinstein	Dem	1980	Kings
42	Rodneyse Bichotte	Dem	2014	Kings
43	Diana Richardson	Dem	2015+	Kings
44	Robert Carroll	Dem	2016	Kings
45	Steven Cymbrowitz	Dem	2000	Kings
46	Mathylde Frontus	Dem	2018	Kings
47	William Colton	Dem	1996	Kings
48	Simcha Eichenstein	Dem	2018	Kings
49	Peter J. Abbate Jr.	Dem	1986	Kings
50	Emily Gallagher	Dem	2020	Kings
51	Marcela Mitaynes	Dem	2020	Kings
52	Jo Anne Simon	Dem	2014	Kings
53	Maritza Davila	Dem	2013+	Kings
54	Erik Martin Dilan	Dem	2014	Kings
55	Latrice Walker	Dem	2014	Kings
56	Stefani Zinerman	Dem	2020	Kings
57	Phara Souffrant Forrest	Dem	2020	Kings
58	N. Nick Perry	Dem	1992	Kings
59	Jaime Williams	Dem	2016+	Kings
60	Charles Barron	Dem	2014	Kings
61	Charles Fall	Dem	2018	Richmond
62	Michael Reilly	Rep	2018	Richmond
63	Michael Cusick	Dem	2002	Richmond
64	Michael Tannousis	Rep	2020	Kings, Richmond
65	Yuh-Line Niou	Dem	2016	New York
66	Deborah Glick	Dem	1990	New York
67	Linda Rosenthal	Dem	2006+	New York
68	Robert J. Rodriguez	Dem	2010	New York
69	Daniel J. O'Donnell	Dem	2002	New York
70	Inez Dickens	Dem	2016	New York
71	Al Taylor	Dem	2017+	New York
72	Carmen De La Rosa	Dem	2016	New York
73	Dan Quart	Dem	2011+	New York
74	Harvey Epstein	Dem	2018+	New York
75	Richard N. Gottfried	Dem	1970	New York
76	Rebecca Seawright	Dem	2014	New York
77	Latoya Joyner	Dem	2014	Bronx
78	Jose Rivera	Dem	2000	Bronx
79	Chantel Jackson	Dem	2020	Bronx
80	Nathalia Fernandez	Dem	2018+	Bronx
81	Jeffrey Dinowitz	Dem	1994+	Bronx
82	Michael Benedetto	Dem	2004	Bronx
83	Carl Heastie	Dem	2000	Bronx
84	Amanda Septimo	Dem	2020	Bronx
85	Kenny Burgos	Dem	2020	Bronx
86	Victor M. Pichardo	Dem	2013+	Bronx
87	Karines Reyes	Dem	2018	Bronx
88	Amy Paulin	Dem	2000	Westchester
89	J. Gary Pretlow	Dem	1992	Westchester
90	Nader Sayegh	Dem	2018	Westchester
91	Steven Otis	Dem	2012	Westchester
92	Thomas J. Abinanti	Dem	2010	Westchester
93	Chris Burdick	Dem	2012	Westchester
94	Kevin Byrne	Rep	2016	Westchester, Putnam
95	Sandy Galef	Dem	1992	Westchester, Putnam
96	Kenneth Zebrowski Jr.	Dem	2007+	Rockland
97	Mike Lawler	Rep	2020	Rockland
98	Karl A. Brabenec	Rep	2014	Orange, Rockland
99	Colin Schmitt	Rep	2018	Orange
100	Aileen Gunther	Dem	2003+	Orange, Sullivan
101	Brian Miller	Rep	2016	Delaware, Herkimer, Oneida, Orange, Otsego, Sullivan, Ulster
102	Christopher Tague	Rep	2018+	Albany, Columbia, Delaware, Greene, Otsego, Schoharie, Ulster
103	Kevin A. Cahill	Dem	1998	Dutchess, Ulster
104	Jonathan Jacobson	Dem	2018	Dutchess, Orange, Ulster
105	Kieran Lalor	Rep	2012	Dutchess
106	Didi Barrett	Dem	2012+	Columbia, Dutchess
107	Jacob Ashby	Rep	2018+	Columbia, Rensselaer, Washington
108	John T. McDonald III	Dem	2012	Albany, Rensselaer, Saratoga
109	Patricia Fahy	Dem	2012	Albany
110	Phillip Steck	Dem	2012	Albany, Schenectady
111	Angelo Santabarbara	Dem	2012	Albany, Montgomery, Schenectady
112	Mary Beth Walsh	Rep	2016	Saratoga, Schenectady
113	Carrie Woerner	Dem	2014	Saratoga, Washington
114	Matthew Simpson	Rep	2020	Essex, Saratoga, Warren, Washington
115	Billy Jones	Dem	2016	Clinton, Franklin, St. Lawrence
116	Mark Walczyk	Rep	2018	Jefferson, St. Lawrence
117	Ken Blankenbush	Rep	2010	Jefferson, Lewis, Oneida, St. Lawrence
118	Robert Smullen	Rep	2018	Fulton, Hamilton, Herkimer, Oneida, St. Lawrence
119	Marianne Buttenschon	Dem	2018	Herkimer, Oneida
120	William Barclay	Rep	2002	Jefferson, Onondaga, Oswego
121	John Salka	Rep	2018	Madison, Oneida, Otsego
122	Joe Angelino	Rep	2020	Broome, Chenango, Delaware, Otsego
123	Donna Lupardo	Dem	2004	Broome
124	Christopher Friend	Rep	2010	Broome, Chemung, Tioga
125	Anna Kelles	Dem	2020	Cortland, Tompkins
126	John Lemondes	Rep	1999+	Cayuga, Chenango, Cortland, Onondaga
127	Albert A. Stirpe Jr.	Dem	2012	Onondaga
128	Pamela Hunter	Dem	2015+	Onondaga
129	William Magnarelli	Dem	1998	Onondaga
130	Brian Manktelow	Rep	2018	Cayuga, Oswego, Wayne
131	Jeff Gallahan	Rep	2020	Ontario, Seneca
132	Phil Palmesano	Rep	2010	Chemung, Schuyler, Seneca, Steuben, Yates
133	Marjorie Byrnes	Rep	2018	Livingston, Monroe, Steuben
134	Josh Jensen	Rep	2020	Monroe
135	Jennifer Lunsford	Dem	2020	Monroe
136	Sarah Clark	Dem	2020	Monroe
137	Demond Meeks	Dem	2020	Monroe
138	Harry Bronson	Dem	2010	Monroe
139	Stephen Hawley	Rep	2006+	Genesee, Monroe, Orleans
140	William C. Conrad	Dem	2020	Erie, Niagara
141	Crystal Peoples-Stokes	Dem	2002	Erie
142	Patrick B. Burke	Dem	2018	Erie
143	Monica P. Wallace	Dem	2016	Erie
144	Michael Norris	Rep	2016	Erie, Niagara, Orleans
145	Angelo Morinello	Rep	2016	Erie, Niagara
146	Karen McMahon	Dem	2018	Erie, Niagara
147	David DiPietro	Rep	2012	Erie, Wyoming
148	Joseph Giglio	Rep	2005+	Allegany, Cattaraugus, Steuben
149	Jonathan Rivera	Dem	2020	Erie
150	Andy Goodell	Rep	2010	Chautauqua

- +Elected in a special election
