= 203rd New York State Legislature =

New York state legislative session

←	202nd	204th	→
- New York State Capitol (2009)

Overview
- Legislative body: New York State Legislature
- Jurisdiction: New York, United States
- Term: January 1, 2019 – December 31, 2020

Senate
- President: Lt. Gov. Kathy Hochul (D)
- Temporary President: Andrea Stewart-Cousins (D)
- Party control: Democratic

Assembly
- Speaker: Carl Heastie (D)
- Party control: Democratic

Sessions
- 1: January 9, 2019 – June 21, 2019
- 2: January 8, – 2020

The 203rd New York State Legislature, consisting of the New York State Senate and the New York State Assembly, met from January 9, 2019, to December 31, 2020, during the ninth and tenth years of Andrew Cuomo's governorship, in Albany.

== Key legislation ==
- Gender Expression Non-Discrimination Act
- Reproductive Health Act (S2796)
- Comprehensive Contraception Coverage Act
- Cannabis and Taxation Act
- Jose Peralta New York state DREAM Act
- Climate Leadership and Community Protection Act
- Child Victims Act
- Greenlight Act
- Farm Laborers Fair Labor Practices Act

== State Senate ==
=== Senators ===
The asterisk (*) denotes members of the previous Legislature who continued in office as members of this Legislature. James Skoufis changed from the Assembly to the Senate.

Note: For brevity, the chairmanships omit the words "...the Committee on (the)..."

District	Senator	Party	Notes
1st	Kenneth LaValle*	Republican	
2nd	John J. Flanagan*	Republican	Minority Leader; resigned his seat effective June 28, 2020
3rd	Monica Martinez	Democrat	
4th	Phil Boyle*	Republican	
5th	Jim Gaughran	Democrat	
6th	Kevin Thomas	Democrat	
7th	Anna Kaplan	Democrat	
8th	John E. Brooks*	Democrat	
9th	Todd Kaminsky*	Democrat	
10th	James Sanders Jr.*	Democrat	
11th	John Liu	Democrat	
12th	Michael Gianaris*	Democrat	
13th	Jessica Ramos	Democrat	
14th	Leroy Comrie*	Democrat	
15th	Joseph Addabbo Jr.*	Democrat	
16th	Toby Ann Stavisky*	Democrat	
17th	Simcha Felder*	Ind. Dem.	
18th	Julia Salazar	Democrat	
19th	Roxanne Persaud*	Democrat	
20th	Zellnor Myrie	Democrat	
21st	Kevin Parker*	Democrat	
22nd	Andrew Gounardes	Democrat	
23rd	Diane Savino*	Democrat	
24th	Andrew Lanza*	Republican	
25th	Velmanette Montgomery*	Democrat	
26th	Brian P. Kavanagh*	Democrat	
27th	Brad Hoylman*	Democrat	
28th	Liz Krueger*	Democrat	
29th	José M. Serrano*	Democrat	
30th	Brian Benjamin*	Democrat	
31st	Robert Jackson	Democrat	
32nd	Luis R. Sepúlveda*	Democrat	
33rd	Gustavo Rivera*	Democrat	
34th	Alessandra Biaggi	Democrat	
35th	Andrea Stewart-Cousins*	Democrat	elected Temporary President
36th	Jamaal Bailey*	Democrat	
37th	Shelley Mayer*	Democrat	
38th	David Carlucci*	Democrat	
39th	James Skoufis*	Democrat	
40th	Peter Harckham	Democrat	
41st	Sue Serino*	Republican	
42nd	Jen Metzger	Democrat	
43rd	Daphne Jordan	Republican	
44th	Neil Breslin*	Democrat	
45th	Betty Little*	Republican	
46th	George A. Amedore Jr.*	Republican	
47th	Joseph Griffo*	Republican	
48th	Patty Ritchie*	Republican	
49th	Jim Tedisco*	Republican	
50th	Bob Antonacci	Republican	on November 5, 2019, elected to the NY Supreme Court
50th	vacant		The seat remained vacant throughout 2020
51st	James L. Seward*	Republican	
52nd	Fred Akshar*	Republican	
53rd	Rachel May	Democrat	
54th	Pam Helming*	Republican	
55th	Rich Funke*	Republican	
56th	Joseph Robach*	Republican	
57th	Catharine Young*	Republican	resigned effective March 10, 2019
57th	George Borrello	Republican	on November 5, 2019, elected to fill vacancy
58th	Tom O'Mara*	Republican	
59th	Patrick M. Gallivan*	Republican	
60th	Chris Jacobs*	Republican	on June 23, 2020, elected to the 116th U.S. Congress
61st	Michael Ranzenhofer*	Republican	
62nd	Rob Ortt*	Republican	Minority Leader from June 28, 2020
63rd	Timothy M. Kennedy*	Democrat	

== State Assembly ==
=== Assembly members ===
Note: For brevity, the chairmanships omit the words "...the Committee on (the)..."

District	Member	Party	First elected	Counties
1	Fred Thiele	Ind	1995+	Suffolk
2	Anthony Palumbo	Rep	2013+	Suffolk
3	Joseph DeStefano	Rep	2018	Suffolk
4	Steven Englebright	Dem	1992+	Suffolk
5	Douglas M. Smith	Rep	2018+	Suffolk
6	Philip Ramos	Dem	2002	Suffolk
7	Andrew Garbarino	Rep	2012	Suffolk
8	Michael J. Fitzpatrick	Rep	2002	Suffolk
9	Michael LiPetri	Rep	2018	Nassau, Suffolk
10	Steve Stern	Dem	2018+	Suffolk
11	Kimberly Jean-Pierre	Dem	2014	Suffolk
12	Andrew Raia	Rep	2002	Suffolk
13	Charles Lavine	Dem	2004	Nassau
14	David McDonough	Rep	2002+	Nassau
15	Michael Montesano	Rep	2010+	Nassau
16	Anthony D'Urso	Dem	2016	Nassau
17	John Mikulin	Rep	2018+	Nassau
18	Taylor Raynor	Dem	2018	Nassau
19	Ed Ra	Rep	2010	Nassau
20	Melissa Miller	Rep	2016	Nassau
21	Judy Griffin	Dem	2018	Nassau
22	Michaelle C. Solages	Dem	2012	Nassau
23	Stacey Pheffer Amato	Dem	2016	Queens
24	David Weprin	Dem	2010+	Queens
25	Nily Rozic	Dem	2012	Queens
26	Edward Braunstein	Dem	2010	Queens
27	Daniel Rosenthal	Dem	2017+	Queens
28	Andrew Hevesi	Dem	2005+	Queens
29	Alicia Hyndman	Dem	2015+	Queens
30	Brian Barnwell	Dem	2016	Queens
31	Michele Titus	Dem	2002+	Queens
32	Vivian E. Cook	Dem	1990	Queens
33	Clyde Vanel	Dem	2016+	Queens
34	Michael DenDekker	Dem	2008	Queens
35	Jeffrion Aubry	Dem	1992+	Queens
36	Aravella Simotas	Dem	2010	Queens
37	Catherine Nolan	Dem	1984	Queens
38	Michael G. Miller	Dem	2009+	Queens
39	Catalina Cruz	Dem	2018	Queens
40	Ron Kim	Dem	2012	Queens
41	Helene Weinstein	Dem	1980	Kings
42	Rodneyse Bichotte	Dem	2014	Kings
43	Diana Richardson	Dem	2015+	Kings
44	Robert Carroll	Dem	2016	Kings
45	Steven Cymbrowitz	Dem	2000	Kings
46	Mathylde Frontus	Dem	2018	Kings
47	William Colton	Dem	1996	Kings
48	Simcha Eichenstein	Dem	2018	Kings
49	Peter Abbate	Dem	1986	Kings
50	Joseph Lentol	Dem	1972	Kings
51	Félix Ortiz	Dem	1994	Kings
52	Jo Anne Simon	Dem	2014	Kings
53	Maritza Davila	Dem	2013+	Kings
54	Erik Dilan	Dem	2014	Kings
55	Latrice Walker	Dem	2014	Kings
56	Tremaine Wright	Dem	2016	Kings
57	Walter T. Mosley	Dem	2012	Kings
58	N. Nick Perry	Dem	1992	Kings
59	Jaime Williams	Dem	2016+	Kings
60	Charles Barron	Dem	2014	Kings
61	Charles Fall	Dem	2018	Richmond
62	Michael Reilly	Rep	2018	Richmond
63	Michael Cusick	Dem	2002	Richmond
64	Nicole Malliotakis	Rep	2010	Kings, Richmond
65	Yuh-Line Niou	Dem	2016	New York
66	Deborah Glick	Dem	1990	New York
67	Linda Rosenthal	Dem	2006+	New York
68	Robert J. Rodriguez	Dem	2010	New York
69	Daniel O'Donnell	Dem	2002	New York
70	Inez Dickens	Dem	2016	New York
71	Al Taylor	Dem	2017+	New York
72	Carmen De La Rosa	Dem	2016	New York
73	Dan Quart	Dem	2011+	New York
74	Harvey Epstein	Dem	2018+	New York
75	Richard Gottfried	Dem	1970	New York
76	Rebecca Seawright	Dem	2014	New York
77	Latoya Joyner	Dem	2014	Bronx
78	Jose Rivera	Dem	2000	Bronx
79	Michael Blake	Dem	2014	Bronx
80	Nathalia Fernandez	Dem	2018+	Bronx
81	Jeffrey Dinowitz	Dem	1994+	Bronx
82	Michael Benedetto	Dem	2004	Bronx
83	Carl Heastie	Dem	2000	Bronx
84	Carmen E. Arroyo	Dem	1994+	Bronx
85	Marcos Crespo	Dem	2009+	Bronx
86	Victor M. Pichardo	Dem	2013+	Bronx
87	Karines Reyes	Dem	2018	Bronx
88	Amy Paulin	Dem	2000	Westchester
89	J. Gary Pretlow	Dem	1992	Westchester
90	Nader Sayegh	Dem	2018	Westchester
91	Steven Otis	Dem	2012	Westchester
92	Tom Abinanti	Dem	2010	Westchester
93	David Buchwald	Dem	2012	Westchester
94	Kevin Byrne	Rep	2016	Westchester, Putnam
95	Sandy Galef	Dem	1992	Westchester, Putnam
96	Kenneth Zebrowski Jr.	Dem	2007+	Rockland
97	Ellen Jaffee	Dem	2006	Rockland
98	Karl A. Brabenec	Rep	2014	Orange, Rockland
99	Colin Schmitt	Rep	2018	Orange
100	Aileen Gunther	Dem	2003+	Orange, Sullivan
101	Brian Miller	Rep	2016	Delaware, Herkimer, Oneida, Orange, Otsego, Sullivan, Ulster
102	Christopher Tague	Rep	2018+	Albany, Columbia, Delaware, Greene, Otsego, Schoharie, Ulster
103	Kevin Cahill	Dem	1998	Dutchess, Ulster
104	Jonathan Jacobson	Dem	2018	Dutchess, Orange, Ulster
105	Kieran Lalor	Rep	2012	Dutchess
106	Didi Barrett	Dem	2012+	Columbia, Dutchess
107	Jacob Ashby	Rep	2018+	Columbia, Rensselaer, Washington
108	John T. McDonald III	Dem	2012	Albany, Rensselaer, Saratoga
109	Patricia Fahy	Dem	2012	Albany
110	Phil Steck	Dem	2012	Albany, Schenectady
111	Angelo Santabarbara	Dem	2012	Albany, Montgomery, Schenectady
112	Mary Beth Walsh	Rep	2016	Saratoga, Schenectady
113	Carrie Woerner	Dem	2014	Saratoga, Washington
114	Dan Stec	Rep	2012	Essex, Saratoga, Warren, Washington
115	Billy Jones	Dem	2016	Clinton, Franklin, St. Lawrence
116	Mark Walczyk	Rep	2018	Jefferson, St. Lawrence
117	Ken Blankenbush	Rep	2010	Jefferson, Lewis, Oneida, St. Lawrence
118	Robert Smullen	Rep	2018	Fulton, Hamilton, Herkimer, Oneida, St. Lawrence
119	Marianne Buttenschon	Dem	2018	Herkimer, Oneida
120	William A. Barclay	Rep	2002	Jefferson, Onondaga, Oswego
121	John Salka	Rep	2018	Madison, Oneida, Otsego
122	Clifford Crouch	Rep	1995+	Broome, Chenango, Delaware, Otsego
123	Donna Lupardo	Dem	2004	Broome
124	Christopher Friend	Rep	2010	Broome, Chemung, Tioga
125	Barbara Lifton	Dem	2002	Cortland, Tompkins
126	Gary Finch	Rep	1999+	Cayuga, Chenango, Cortland, Onondaga
127	Al Stirpe	Dem	2012	Onondaga
128	Pamela Hunter	Dem	2015+	Onondaga
129	William Magnarelli	Dem	1998	Onondaga
130	Brian Manktelow	Rep	2018	Cayuga, Oswego, Wayne
131	Brian Kolb	Rep	2000+	Ontario, Seneca
132	Philip Palmesano	Rep	2010	Chemung, Schuyler, Seneca, Steuben, Yates
133	Marjorie Byrnes	Rep	2018	Livingston, Monroe, Steuben
134	Peter Lawrence	Rep	2014	Monroe
135	Mark C. Johns	Rep	2010	Monroe
136	Jamie Romeo	Dem	2018	Monroe
137	David Gantt	Dem	1982	Monroe
138	Harry Bronson	Dem	2010	Monroe
139	Stephen Hawley	Rep	2006+	Genesee, Monroe, Orleans
140	Robin Schimminger	Dem	1976	Erie, Niagara
141	Crystal Peoples	Dem	2002	Erie
142	Patrick B. Burke	Dem	2018	Erie
143	Monica P. Wallace	Dem	2016	Erie
144	Michael Norris	Rep	2016	Erie, Niagara, Orleans
145	Angelo Morinello	Rep	2016	Erie, Niagara
146	Karen McMahon	Dem	2018	Erie, Niagara
147	David DiPietro	Rep	2012	Erie, Wyoming
148	Joseph Giglio	Rep	2005+	Allegany, Cattaraugus, Steuben
149	Sean Ryan	Dem	2011+	Erie
150	Andy Goodell	Rep	2010	Chautauqua

- +Elected in a special election

== Sources ==
- Senate election results at NYS Board of Elections
