= Martin A. Luster =

American politician (1942–2025)

Martin A. Luster (April 4, 1942 - November 28, 2025) was an American politician who served in the New York State Assembly from 1989 to 2002 in New York's 125th State Assembly district.

Born in Brooklyn on April 4, 1942, Luster graduated with a business management degree from Long Island University in 1963 before obtaining a law degree from New York University School of Law in 1966.

After moving to Tompkins County in 1976, Luster was elected town supervisor of Ulysses in 1983, becoming the first Democrat to hold the position since 1922.

In 1986, Luster unsuccessfully challenged Republican Sam MacNeil in the race for 121st State Assembly district. Two years later, he defeated MacNeil's former aide Roxanne Buck to win a spot in the Assembly, forcing his resignation as Ulysses town supervisor.

Luster served eight terms in the State Assembly, retiring in 2002. He served as chair of the Committee on Mental Health and the Committee on Libraries and Education Technology. After leaving the Assembly, he served as Ithaca's city attorney.

Luster died on November 28, 2025 in Gloucester, Massachusetts.

New York State Assembly
Preceded by Sam MacNeil	New York State Assembly; 125th District; 1989-2002	Succeeded by Barbara Lifton
