= Michael F. Nozzolio =

American politician (born 1951)

Member of the New York State Senate
- In office January 1, 1993 – December 31, 2016
- Preceded by: L. Paul Kehoe
- Succeeded by: Pam Helming
- Constituency: 53rd district (1993-2002); 54th district (2003-2016)

Member of the New York Assembly from the 128th District
- In office January 1, 1983 – December 31, 1992
- Preceded by: Hugh S. MacNeil
- Succeeded by: Bob Oaks

Personal details
- Born: April 10, 1951 (age 75) Seneca Falls, New York, U.S.
- Party: Republican
- Spouse: Rosemary Nozzolio
- Education: Cornell University (B.A.), (M.P.A.); Syracuse University (J.D.)
- Website: Official site

Michael F. Nozzolio (born April 10, 1951) is the former New York State Senator for the 54th district. He is a Republican. He was first elected in 1992. The 54th district included parts of the city of Auburn, New York, Geneva, New York, and part or all of the following counties, Wayne County, Ontario County, Cayuga County, Tompkins County, Seneca County, and Monroe County. Nozzolio did not seek re-election in 2016, and was succeeded by Pam Helming.

He previously served as a member of the state Assembly from 1983-92.

== Biography ==
Nozzolio was born on April 10, 1951, in Seneca Falls, New York, the son of Anna and Albert F. Nozzolio. He and his wife, Rosemary, live in Fayette, in Seneca County, New York. He studied Industrial and Labor Relations as an undergraduate at Cornell University, where he also earned a master's degree in Public Administration and Agricultural Economics. He holds a Juris Doctor from Syracuse University College of Law. Nozzolio also served as a JAG officer in the U.S. Naval Reserves and is currently a Commander in the New York Naval Militia.

Nozzolio has also been awarded the Father Joseph P. Beatini Memorial Award and was the recipient of the prestigious Jerome Alpern Distinguished Alumni Award from the Cornell School of Industrial and Labor Relations, one of the highest honors that can be bestowed on a Cornell University alumnus. Nozzolio currently serves as a member of the Cornell University Council and on the Board of the Cornell Agriculture and Food Technology Park. Nozzolio is also a member of the First Niagara Bank Advisory Board.

In 2016, Nozzolio announced that he would not seek reelection, citing the prohibitive recovery period for an upcoming open-heart surgery. He is currently a Member of Harris Beach. law firm in Rochester, New York.

== See also ==
- List of New York state senators

New York State Assembly
| Preceded by Hugh MacNeil | New York State Assembly; 128th District; 1983–1992 | Succeeded by Bob Oaks |
New York State Senate
| Preceded by L. Paul Kehoe | New York State Senate; 53rd District; 1993–2002 | Succeeded by Randy Kuhl |
| Preceded by Richard A. Dollinger | New York State Senate; 54th District; 2003–2016 | Succeeded by Pam Helming |
| Preceded by Ruth Hassell-Thompson | New York State Senate; Chairman of the Committee on Crime Victims, Crime and Corrections; 2011–2012 | Succeeded by Patrick M. Gallivan |
| Preceded by Stephen M. Saland | New York State Senate; Chairman of the Committee on Codes; 2012–2016 | Succeeded by TBD |
