= New York's 17th State Assembly district =

American legislative district

Assemblymember
John Mikulin; R–Bethpage

New York's 17th State Assembly district is one of the 150 districts in the New York State Assembly. It has been represented by Republican John Mikulin since a special election in 2018.

== Geography ==
=== 2020s ===
District 17 is in Nassau County. It contains portions of the towns of Hempstead and Oyster Bay, including most of Levittown, East Meadow and North Massapequa and portions of Massapequa, Plainedge, Seaford and Salisbury.

The district overlaps New York's 2nd, 3rd and 4th congressional districts, and overlaps the 5th and 8th districts of the New York State Senate.

=== 2010s ===
District 17 is in Nassau County. It contains portions of the towns of Hempstead and Oyster Bay, including Levittown, Bethpage, Plainedge, North Massepequa and Massapequa.

== Recent election results ==
=== 2026 ===
2026 New York State Assembly election, District 17
Party	Candidate	Votes	%
Republican	John Mikulin		
Conservative	John Mikulin		
Total	John Mikulin (incumbent)		
Democratic	Sunita Lofters		
Write-in			
Total votes			

=== 2024 ===
2024 New York State Assembly election, District 17
Party	Candidate	Votes	%
Republican	John Mikulin	41,294	
Conservative	John Mikulin	3,733	
Total	John Mikulin (incumbent)	45,027	65.3
Democratic	Harpreet Toor	23,887	34.6
Write-in		79	0.1
Total votes		68,993	100.0
Republican hold			

=== 2022 ===
2022 New York State Assembly election, District 17
Party	Candidate	Votes	%
Republican	John Mikulin	31,558	
Conservative	John Mikulin	3,034	
Total	John Mikulin (incumbent)	34,592	66.1
Democratic	Paul Kaminsky	17,703	33.9
Write-in		12	0.0
Total votes		52,307	100.0
Republican hold			

=== 2020 ===
2020 New York State Assembly election, District 17
Party	Candidate	Votes	%
Republican	John Mikulin	35,745	
Conservative	John Mikulin	3,226	
Independence	John Mikulin	710	
Total	John Mikulin (incumbent)	39,681	59.7
Democratic	Mark Engelman	26,768	40.3
Write-in		19	0.0
Total votes		66,468	100.0
Republican hold			

=== 2018 ===
2018 New York State Assembly election, District 17
Primary election
Party	Candidate	Votes	%
Republican	John Mikulin (incumbent)	2,604	70.5
Republican	James Coll	1,090	29.5
Write-in		0	0.0
Total votes		3,694	100
Reform	John Mikulin (incumbent)	205	97.1
Reform	James Coll	4	1.9
Reform	Kimberly Snow	1	0.5
Reform	Blake Morris	1	0.5
Write-in		0	0.0
Total votes		211	100
General election
Republican	John Mikulin	23,670	
Conservative	John Mikulin	2,504	
Independence	John Mikulin	396	
Tax Revolt Party	John Mikulin	99	
Reform	John Mikulin	75	
Total	John Mikulin (incumbent)	26,744	55.9
Democratic	Kimberly Snow	20,602	
Women's Equality	Kimberly Snow	445	
Total	Kimberly Snow	21,047	44.1
Write-in		18	0.0
Total votes		47,809	100.0
Republican hold			

=== 2018 special ===
2018 New York State Assembly special election, District 17
Party	Candidate	Votes	%
Republican	John Mikulin	1,743	
Conservative	John Mikulin	340	
Independence	John Mikulin	51	
Reform	John Mikulin	9	
Total	John Mikulin	2,143	63.3
Democratic	Matthew Malin	1,118	
Working Families	Matthew Malin	60	
Women's Equality	Matthew Malin	37	
Total	Matthew Malin	1,215	35.9
Write-in		26	0.8
Total votes		3,384	100.0
Republican hold			

=== 2016 ===
2016 New York State Assembly election, District 17
Party	Candidate	Votes	%
Republican	Thomas McKevitt	31,742	
Conservative	Thomas McKevitt	3,528	
Independence	Thomas McKevitt	767	
Tax Revolt Party	Thomas McKevitt	235	
Reform	Thomas McKevitt	145	
Total	Thomas McKevitt (incumbent)	36,147	62.6
Democratic	Matthew Malin	20,094	
Working Families	Matthew Malin	1,084	
Women's Equality	Matthew Malin	403	
Total	Matthew Malin	21,581	37.4
Write-in		18	0.0
Total votes		57,762	100.0
Republican hold			

=== 2014 ===
2014 New York State Assembly election, District 9
Party	Candidate	Votes	%
Republican	Thomas McKevitt	16,229	
Conservative	Thomas McKevitt	2,727	
Independence	Thomas McKevitt	811	
Tax Revolt Party	Thomas McKevitt	145	
Total	Thomas McKevitt (incumbent)	19,912	69.1
Democratic	Jonathan Clarke	8,887	30.8
Write-in		16	0.1
Total votes		28,815	100.0
Republican hold			

=== 2012 ===
2012 New York State Assembly election, District 17
Party	Candidate	Votes	%
Republican	Thomas McKevitt	22,858	
Conservative	Thomas McKevitt	3,237	
Independence	Thomas McKevitt	850	
Tax Revolt Party	Thomas McKevitt	169	
Total	Thomas McKevitt (incumbent)	27,114	57.4
Democratic	Kevin Brady	18,533	
Working Families	Kevin Brady	1,605	
Total	Kevin Brady	20,138	42.6
Write-in		15	0.0
Total votes		47,267	100.0
Republican hold			

=== 2010 ===
2010 New York State Assembly election, District 16
Party	Candidate	Votes	%
Republican	Thomas McKevitt	20,683	
Conservative	Thomas McKevitt	3,055	
Independence	Thomas McKevitt	1,028	
Total	Thomas McKevitt (incumbent)	24,766	62.2
Democratic	Thomas Devaney	14,068	
Working Families	Thomas Devaney	992	
Total	Thomas Devaney	15,060	37.8
Write-in		12	0.0
Total votes		39,838	100.0
Republican hold			
