= New York's 10th State Assembly district =

American legislative district

Assemblymember
Steve Stern; D–Dix Hills

New York's 10th State Assembly district is one of the 150 districts in the New York State Assembly. It has been represented by Democrat Steve Stern since 2018, succeeding Chad Lupinacci.

== Geography ==
=== 2020s ===
District 10 includes portions of Suffolk and Nassau counties. The district includes portions of the town of Huntington and Oyster Bay. Villages and hamlets within the district includes Cold Spring Harbor, Huntington Station, South Huntington, West Hills, Melville, Dix Hills, Woodbury and portions of Old Bethpage, Plainview, Greenlawn, and Elwood.

The district overlaps New York's 1st and 3rd congressional districts, and overlaps the 2nd, 5th and 7th districts of the New York State Senate.

=== 2010s ===
District 10 is in Suffolk County. The district includes portions of the towns of Huntington and Babylon. Lloyd Harbor, Huntington Bay, Cold Spring Harbor, Greenlawn, Huntington Station, Elwood, South Huntington, West Hills, Melville and Dix Hills are some villages and hamlets within the district.

== Recent election results ==
=== 2026 ===
2026 New York State Assembly election, District 10
Party	Candidate	Votes	%
Democratic	Steve Stern (incumbent)		
Republican	Tiffany LeGrow		
Conservative	Tiffany LeGrow		
Total	Tiffany LeGrow		
Write-in			
Total votes			

=== 2024 ===
2024 New York State Assembly election, District 10
Party	Candidate	Votes	%
Democratic	Steve Stern (incumbent)	35,938	55.9
Republican	Aamir Sultan	25,287	
Conservative	Aamir Sultan	3,000	
Total	Aamir Sultan	28,287	44.0
Write-in		45	0.1
Total votes		64.270	100.0
Democratic hold			

=== 2022 ===
2022 New York State Assembly election, District 10
Party	Candidate	Votes	%
Democratic	Steve Stern (incumbent)	26,646	54.4
Republican	Aamir Sultan	19,274	
Conservative	Aamir Sultan	2,628	
Total	Aamir Sultan	22,352	45.6
Write-in		14	0.0
Total votes		49,006	100.0
Democratic hold			

=== 2020 ===
2020 New York State Assembly election, District 10
Party	Candidate	Votes	%
Democratic	Steve Stern	34,555	
Working Families	Steve Stern	1,674	
Independence	Steve Stern	832	
Total	Steve Stern (incumbent)	37,061	56.4
Republican	Jamie Silvestri	25,516	
Conservative	Jamie Silvestri	3,104	
Total	Jamie Silvestri	28,620	43.6
Write-in		11	0.0
Total votes		65,694	100.0
Democratic hold			

=== 2018 ===
2018 New York State Assembly election, District 10
Party	Candidate	Votes	%
Democratic	Steve Stern	26,935	
Independence	Steve Stern	699	
Working Families	Steve Stern	613	
Women's Equality	Steve Stern	312	
Total	Steve Stern (incumbent)	28,559	59.9
Republican	Jeremy Williams	17,129	
Conservative	Jeremy Williams	2,006	
Total	Jeremy Williams	19,135	40.1
Write-in		6	0.0
Total votes		47,700	100.0
Democratic hold			

=== 2018 special ===
2018 New York State Assembly special election, District 10
Party	Candidate	Votes	%
Democratic	Steve Stern	5,477	
Working Families	Steve Stern	223	
Independence	Steve Stern	205	
Women's Equality	Steve Stern	120	
Reform	Steve Stern	33	
Total	Steve Stern	6,058	59.0
Republican	Janet Smitelli	3,356	
Conservative	Janet Smitelli	843	
Total	Janet Smitelli	4,199	41.0
Write-in		3	0.0
Total votes		10,260	100.0
Democratic gain from Republican			

=== 2016 ===
2016 New York State Assembly election, District 10
Primary election
Party	Candidate	Votes	%
Working Families	Chad Lupinacci (incumbent, write-in)	95	91.3
Working Families	Edwin Perez	9	8.7
Write-in		0	0.0
Total votes		104	100
General election
Republican	Chad Lupinacci	27,231	
Conservative	Chad Lupinacci	3,703	
Independence	Chad Lupinacci	1,456	
Reform	Chad Lupinacci	281	
Total	Chad Lupinacci (incumbent)	32,671	57.7
Democratic	Edwin Perez	23,923	42.2
Write-in		40	0.1
Total votes		56,634	100.0
Republican hold			

=== 2014 ===
2014 New York State Assembly election, District 10
Party	Candidate	Votes	%
Republican	Chad Lupinacci	13,887	
Conservative	Chad Lupinacci	2,273	
Independence	Chad Lupinacci	1,297	
Total	Chad Lupinacci (incumbent)	17,457	62.7
Democratic	Dominick Feeley Jr.	10,367	37.2
Write-in		14	0.1
Total votes		27,838	100.0
Republican hold			

=== 2012 ===
2012 New York State Assembly election, District 10
Party	Candidate	Votes	%
Republican	Chad Lupinacci	21,183	
Conservative	Chad Lupinacci	3,135	
Independence	Chad Lupinacci	1,191	
Working Families	Chad Lupinacci	901	
Total	Chad Lupinacci	26,410	55.3
Democratic	Joseph Dujmic Jr.	21,331	44.7
Write-in		15	0.0
Total votes		47,756	100.0
Republican hold			
