= William J. Lindsay =

American politician

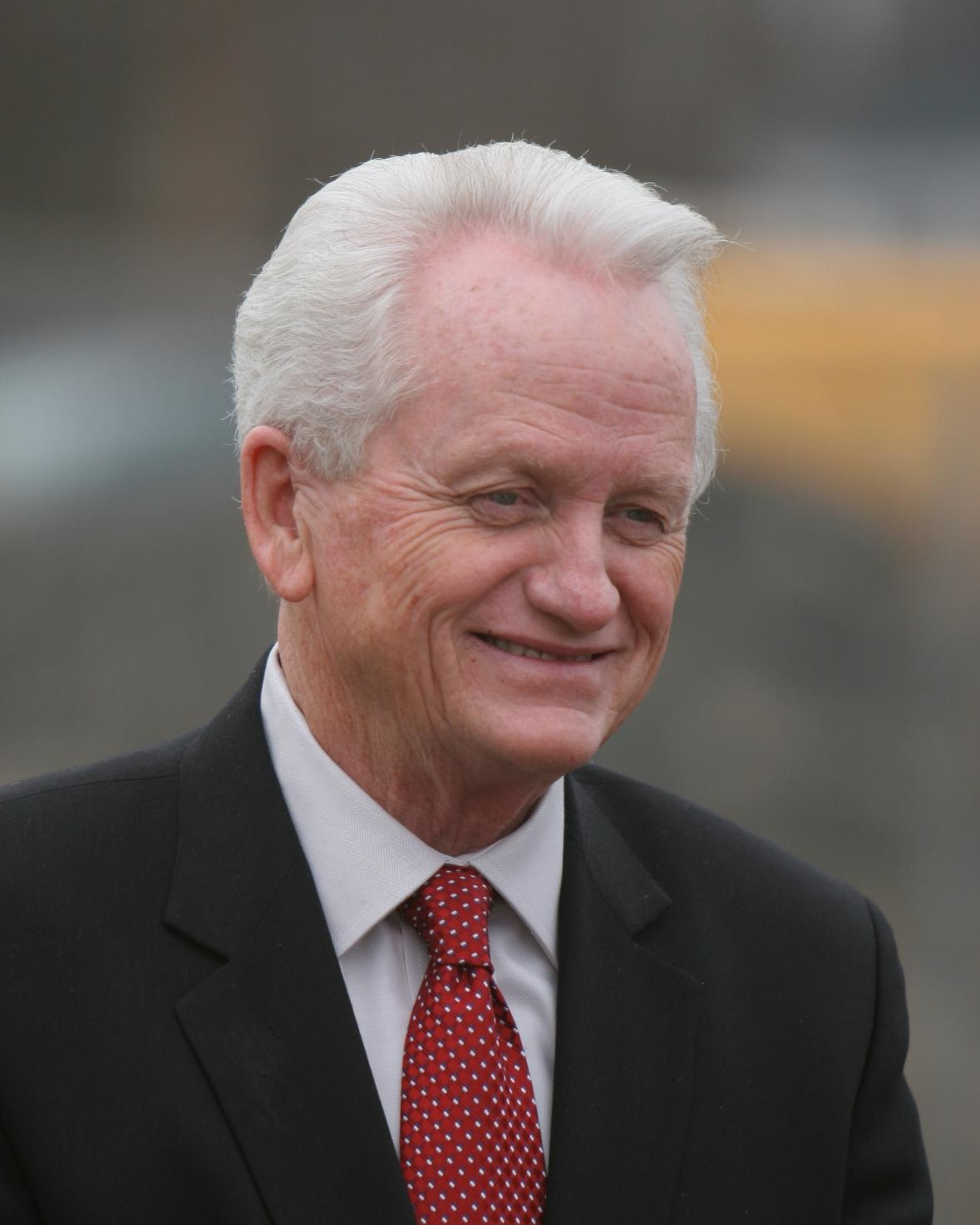

Member of the Suffolk County Legislature from the 8th District
- In office 2001 – 2013 (died while in office)
- Preceded by: Steve Levy
- Succeeded by: William J. Lindsay III

Personal details
- Born: November 24, 1945 Glen Cove Hospital
- Died: September 2013 (aged 67)
- Party: Democratic
- Spouse: Patricia
- Children: three
- Education: Glen Cove High School, New York Institute of Technology
- Occupation: County Legislator, Union Official, Presiding Officer
- Website: Official website

William J. Lindsay (November 24, 1945 – September 2013) was an American politician. He served as Suffolk County, New York Legislator from the 8th district until his death. He also served as the presiding officer of the Suffolk County legislature and was the longest serving PO in the history of Suffolk County.

Lindsay was a native of Long Island, having lived in Glen Cove as a child.

He spent the majority of his life as an electrician. This career began through an apprenticeship with the International Brotherhood of Electrical Workers (IBEW), Local 25. He spent many years as a construction electrician and eventually became involved in the operation and management of the union. Lindsay served as Business Manager of IBEW Local 25 starting in 1992. During that time he served on numerous boards, including the Long Island Housing Partnership and the Long Island Federation of Labor.

Lindsay ran for the 8th Legislative district in March 2001. The special election came about as a result of the then-current legislator, Steve Levy, winning election to the New York State Assembly. Running on the Democratic line, he won election by a narrow margin. With his responsibility to the 8th Legislative district, Lindsay retired from his position within IBEW Local 25.

Lindsay and his wife Patricia resided in Holbrook, New York, and have three children; Kathleen, Denise, and William. His legacy lived on in Suffolk County for six years with his son William J. Lindsay III representing the people of the 8th district at the legislature until losing his third re-election bid in 2019. Suffolk County Community College has also kept his memory alive by erecting a building on the Ammerman Campus in Selden and naming it The William J. Lindsay Life Sciences Building.

Preceded by Steve Levy	Suffolk County Legislature, 8th District; 2001–present	Incumbent
