= New York's 125th State Assembly district =

American legislative district

Assemblymember
| Anna Kelles; D–Ithaca |

New York's 125th State Assembly district is one of the 150 districts in the New York State Assembly. It has been represented by Anna Kelles since 2021, succeeding Barbara Lifton.

== Geography ==
District 125 contains all of Tompkins County and the southwest portion of Cortland County. This includes the cities of Ithaca and Cortland. Cornell University's campus is also within this district.

== Recent election results ==
=== 2026 ===
2026 New York State Assembly election, District 125
| Party | Candidate | Votes | % |
|---|---|---|---|
| Democratic | Anna Kelles | | |
| Working Families | Anna Kelles | | |
| Total | Anna Kelles (incumbent) | | |
| Write-in | | | |
| Total votes | | | |

=== 2024 ===
2024 New York State Assembly election, District 125
| Party | Candidate | Votes | % |
|---|---|---|---|
| Democratic | Anna Kelles | 35,673 | |
| Working Families | Anna Kelles | 8,631 | |
| Total | Anna Kelles (incumbent) | 44,304 | 97.5 |
| Write-in | | 1,131 | 1.5 |
| Total votes | | 45,435 | 100.0 |
| Democratic hold | | | |

=== 2022 ===
2022 New York State Assembly election, District 125
| Party | Candidate | Votes | % |
|---|---|---|---|
| Democratic | Anna Kelles | 25,640 | |
| Working Families | Anna Kelles | 6,681 | |
| Total | Anna Kelles (incumbent) | 32,321 | 99.4 |
| Write-in | | 192 | 0.6 |
| Total votes | | 32,513 | 100.0 |
| Democratic hold | | | |

=== 2020 ===
2020 New York State Assembly election, District 125
Primary election
| Party | Candidate | Votes | % |
|---|---|---|---|
| Democratic | Anna Kelles | 5,509 | 36.0 |
| Democratic | Seph Murtagh | 3,340 | 21.8 |
| Democratic | Jordan Lesser | 2,245 | 14.7 |
| Democratic | Sujata Gibson | 1,756 | 11.5 |
| Democratic | Jason Leifer | 948 | 6.2 |
| Democratic | Beau Harbin | 767 | 5.0 |
| Democratic | Lisa Hoeschele | 734 | 4.8 |
| Write-in | | 12 | 0.0 |
| Total votes | | 15,311 | 100 |
General election
| Democratic | Anna Kelles | 31,979 | |
| Working Families | Anna Kelles | 5,694 | |
| Total | Anna Kelles | 37,673 | 68.8 |
| Republican | Matthew McIntyre | 15,997 | |
| Libertarian | Matthew McIntyre | 1,031 | |
| Total | Matthew McIntyre | 17,028 | 31.1 |
| Write-in | | 45 | 0.1 |
| Total votes | | 54,746 | 100.0 |
| Democratic hold | | | |

=== 2018 ===
2018 New York State Assembly election, District 125
| Party | Candidate | Votes | % |
|---|---|---|---|
| Democratic | Barbara Lifton (incumbent) | 35,459 | 98.9 |
| Write-in | | 395 | 1.1 |
| Total votes | | 35,854 | 100.0 |
| Democratic hold | | | |

=== 2016 ===
2016 New York State Assembly election, District 125
| Party | Candidate | Votes | % |
|---|---|---|---|
| Democratic | Barbara Lifton | 30,974 | |
| Working Families | Barbara Lifton | 4,442 | |
| Total | Barbara Lifton (incumbent) | 35,416 | 69.8 |
| Republican | Herbert Masser Jr. | 13,101 | |
| Conservative | Herbert Masser Jr. | 1,737 | |
| Reform | Herbert Masser Jr. | 426 | |
| Total | Herbert Masser Jr. | 15,264 | 30.1 |
| Write-in | | 39 | 0.1 |
| Total votes | | 50,719 | 100.0 |
| Democratic hold | | | |

=== 2014 ===
2014 New York State Assembly election, District 125
| Party | Candidate | Votes | % |
|---|---|---|---|
| Democratic | Barbara Lifton | 17,321 | |
| Working Families | Barbara Lifton | 4,014 | |
| Total | Barbara Lifton (incumbent) | 21,335 | 66.8 |
| Republican | Herbert Masser Jr. | 10,581 | 33.1 |
| Write-in | | 18 | 0.1 |
| Total votes | | 31,934 | 100.0 |
| Democratic hold | | | |

=== 2012 ===
2012 New York State Assembly election, District 125
| Party | Candidate | Votes | % |
|---|---|---|---|
| Democratic | Barbara Lifton | 30,796 | |
| Working Families | Barbara Lifton | 6,100 | |
| Total | Barbara Lifton (incumbent) | 36,896 | 99.9 |
| Write-in | | 36 | 0.1 |
| Total votes | | 36,932 | 100.0 |
| Democratic hold | | | |
