= Steve Bellone =

American politician

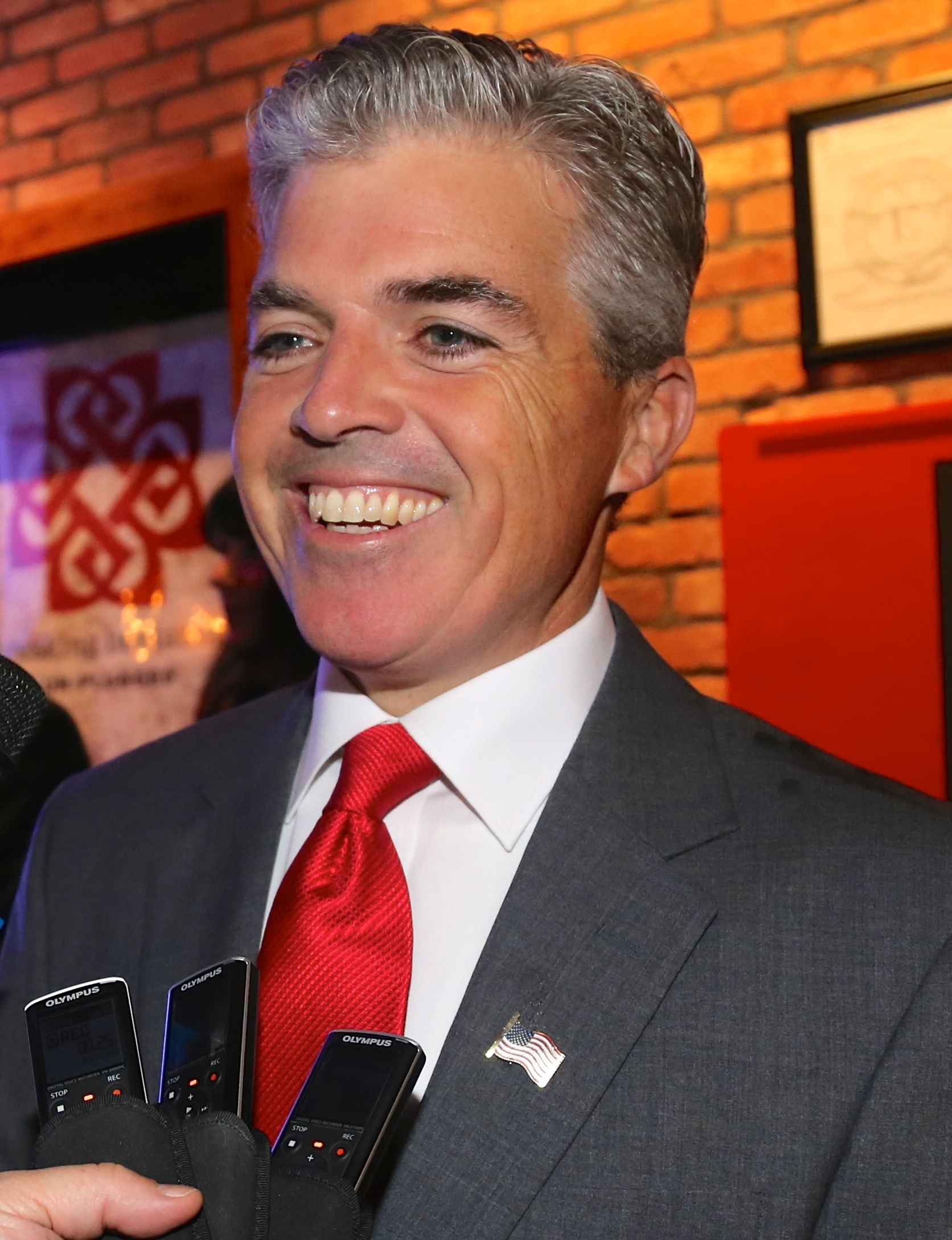

8th Executive of Suffolk County
- In office January 1, 2012 – December 31, 2023
- Preceded by: Steve Levy
- Succeeded by: Ed Romaine

Supervisor of Babylon
- In office January 1, 2002 – December 31, 2011
- Preceded by: Rich Schaffer
- Succeeded by: Rich Schaffer

Personal details
- Born: September 11, 1969 (age 56) North Babylon, New York, U.S.
- Party: Democratic
- Education: Queens College (BA); Fordham University (JD)

Steven Bellone (born September 11, 1969) is an American politician who served as the 8th County Executive of Suffolk County, New York, on Long Island.

== Early life and education ==
Steven Bellone was raised in Babylon, New York. He graduated from North Babylon High School and earned a Bachelor of Arts degree in political science and communications at Queens College in 1991. Bellone enlisted in the United States Army in 1992 and served as a Communications Specialist stationed at Fort Leonard Wood, Missouri. Bellone earned his Juris Doctor from Fordham University School of Law and was admitted to the New York State Bar Association in 1999.

== Babylon Town Supervisor ==
At age 32, after serving four years on the Babylon Town Board, Bellone was elected Supervisor of Babylon Township in 2001 to represent over 210,000 residents. As Supervisor, Bellone focused on government reform, reducing the size of government and delivering a $4.3 million tax cut to residents.

=== Long Island Green Homes ===
Bellone received national attention after spearheading an innovative environmental program called Long Island Green Homes. The program incentivized homeowners to make energy improvement upgrades to their homes to achieve considerable savings on energy bills. Bellone was named Environmentalist of the Year by the Sierra Club's Long Island Group in 2009 in recognition of this initiative.

=== Wyandanch Rising ===
Bellone launched Wyandanch Rising, a comprehensive community revitalization plan in Wyandanch, New York, that attracted over $70 million from government and private partners. This transit-oriented development included plans for a walkable, mixed-use community with bicycle lanes, on-street parking, better-lit sidewalks, safer crosswalks, mixed-use buildings, and public art blended with considerable residential, commercial, restaurant and gallery space.

As a result of these revitalization efforts, Wyandanch Rising was selected to be the first permanent home of the Long Island Music Hall of Fame museum on October 23, 2014.

== Suffolk County Executive ==
With over 240,000 votes cast, Bellone was elected with 57% of the vote in 2011 in his bid for Suffolk County Executive. As County Executive, Bellone has focused on restoring structural financial balance, implementing government reforms, improving water quality, and ensuring a high quality of life for Suffolk County residents.

In 2015, with 99,115 votes, Bellone won reelection as Suffolk County Executive, defeating Jim O'Connor by nearly 25,000 votes.

=== Fiscal policy ===
Bellone's first term began with an inherited deficit of over US$500 million which coincided with the Great Recession of 2008 and 2009. Using the same economic policies instituted in the Town of Babylon to restore fiscal balance, the Bellone administration reduced Suffolk's deficit by hundreds of millions of dollars. The 2015 budget proposal recommends actions to eliminate the budget deficit completely. The Suffolk County deficit currently stands at $89.9 million, a reduction of $411 million in two years.

=== Government reform ===
After Bellone took office, his administration enacted a series of government reforms and offered a variety of proposals to improve government efficiencies while maintaining reduced staffing levels. Beginning in 2010, county staffing was reduced by more than 1,100 employees and achieved annual reoccurring savings of over $100 million as a result. The reduction of "one-shot" revenues has allowed Suffolk County to focus on long-term budget mitigation efforts. In addition, Bellone championed the merger of the Suffolk County Comptroller's Office and Suffolk County Treasurer's Office, a move estimated to save $800,000 a year and streamline the county's financial operations. The merger was approved by over 61% of Suffolk County voters in the November 4, 2014 election. The consolidation of the two offices took place on January 1, 2018.

=== Water quality ===
In 2014, Bellone announced that improving the region's water quality would be his administration's top priority, and launched the "Reclaim Our Water " initiative, a comprehensive plan to improve Suffolk County's water quality and eradicate nitrogen pollution. Failing and unmaintained septic systems and cesspools had created an excess amount of nitrogen pollution in the region's water supply, becoming a serious threat to Long Island's water quality, wildlife, and quality of life; and had decimated the shellfish industry. Nitrogen poisoning also destroyed the region's coastal vegetation, which acts as a natural habitat for marine and aviary life as well as a natural buffer against devastating storm surges as seen during Superstorm Sandy. The county identified 360,000 unsewered homes that contributed to nearly 70% of the nitrogen pollution load, and developed an actionable, long-term plan to sewer targeted areas, fortify existing waste water infrastructure, and bring advanced on-site waste water treatment systems to residential properties that were contributing most to the nitrification of waters. Bellone worked extensively with state and federal officials to secure an investment of more than $380 million to help reduce excess nitrogen pollution, invest in wastewater infrastructure and help protect coastal vegetation and marshlands.

=== Economic development ===
Bellone initiated a series of economic development plans to build innovation economies throughout Suffolk County to attract highly skilled and knowledge workers, and to keep young professionals on Long Island. Bellone tasked the Suffolk County Department of Economic Development and Planning with developing Suffolk County's first comprehensive master plan in decades to address issues involving land use, the overall economy, traffic and transportation, and natural and built resources. He introduced his Connect Long Island vision, a comprehensive transportation and development plan to connect Suffolk County downtowns, universities and research centers via mass transit. The plan strengthened local businesses by expanding natural customer bases and developed the necessary infrastructure to provide residents with north-to-south transportation options.

=== Performance management ===
In order to maintain core government services while operating with reduced staff, the Bellone administration expanded its Performance Management department, which is responsible for ensuring the county workforce is as productive as possible. The office implemented quality improvements to improve operations in all government departments.

=== End of administration ===
Bellone was prevented from running for reelection in 2023 by a Suffolk County law on term limits that he had signed and was overwhelmingly passed in a referendum the previous year.
