= New York's 5th State Assembly district =

American legislative district

Assemblymember
Douglas Smith; R–Holbrook
- Demographics: 79.1% White; 2.6% Black; 12.2% Hispanic; 4.2% Asian; 0% Native American; 0% Hawaiian/Pacific Islander; 0.5% Other; 1.3% Multiracial
- Population (2020): 127,191

New York's 5th State Assembly district is one of the 150 districts in the New York State Assembly. It has been represented by Republican Assemblyman Douglas M. Smith since 2018.

== Members ==
- Richard DiNapoli
- William L. Burns
- Dennis O'Doherty
- Paul E. Harenberg
- Steve Levy
- Ginny Fields
- Al Graf
- Douglas M. Smith

== Geography ==
=== 2020s ===
District 5 is in Suffolk County, and includes portions of the towns of Brookhaven and Islip. Most of the hamlets of Centereach, Ronkonkoma and Holbrook lie within the district, as well as portions of Islandia, North Patchogue and Selden.

The district overlaps New York's 1st and 2nd congressional districts, and the 3rd and 8th districts of the New York State Senate.

=== 2010s ===
District 5 is in Suffolk County, and includes portions of the towns of Brookhaven and Islip.

== Recent election results ==
=== 2026 ===
2026 New York State Assembly election, District 5
Party	Candidate	Votes	%
Republican	Douglas Smith		
Conservative	Douglas Smith		
Total	Douglas Smith (incumbent)		
Democratic	Victoria Russell		
Write-in			
Total votes			

=== 2024 ===
2024 New York State Assembly election, District 5
Party	Candidate	Votes	%
Republican	Douglas Smith	36,953	
Conservative	Douglas Smith	4,521	
Total	Douglas Smith (incumbent)	41,474	64.5
Democratic	Michael Reynolds	22,783	35.4
Write-in		47	0.1
Total votes		64,304	100.0
Republican hold			

=== 2022 ===
2022 New York State Assembly election, District 5
Party	Candidate	Votes	%
Republican	Douglas Smith	28,974	
Conservative	Douglas Smith	4,269	
Total	Douglas Smith (incumbent)	33,243	67.1
Democratic	James Anthony	16,278	32.9
Write-in		5	0.0
Total votes		49,526	100.0
Republican hold			

=== 2020 ===
2020 New York State Assembly election, District 5
Party	Candidate	Votes	%
Republican	Douglas Smith	32,737	
Conservative	Douglas Smith	3,728	
Independence	Douglas Smith	745	
Total	Douglas Smith (incumbent)	37,210	61.3
Democratic	Alfred Ianacci	23,516	38.7
Write-in		7	0.0
Total votes		60,733	100.0
Republican hold			

=== 2018 ===
2018 New York State Assembly election, District 5
Party	Candidate	Votes	%
Republican	Douglas Smith	21,745	
Conservative	Douglas Smith	2,551	
Independence	Douglas Smith	653	
Reform	Douglas Smith	126	
Total	Douglas Smith (incumbent)	25,075	58.7
Democratic	Timothy Hall	17,668	41.3
Write-in		13	0.0
Total votes		42,756	100.0
Republican hold			

=== 2018 special ===
2018 New York State Assembly special election, District 5
Party	Candidate	Votes	%
Republican	Douglas Smith	2,212	
Conservative	Douglas Smith	621	
Independence	Douglas Smith	177	
Reform	Douglas Smith	21	
Total	Douglas Smith	3,031	63.1
Democratic	Deborah Slinkosky	1,767	36.8
Write-in		5	0.1
Total votes		4,803	100.0
Republican hold			

=== 2016 ===
2016 New York State Assembly election, District 5
Party	Candidate	Votes	%
Republican	Al Graf	27,949	
Conservative	Al Graf	4,097	
Independence	Al Graf	1,190	
Reform	Al Graf	148	
Total	Al Graf (incumbent)	33,384	63.5
Democratic	Deborah Slinkosky	18,313	34.9
Libertarian	James Smith	824	1.6
Write-in		26	0.0
Total votes		52,547	100.0
Republican hold			

=== 2014 ===
2014 New York State Assembly election, District 5
Party	Candidate	Votes	%
Republican	Al Graf	12,883	
Conservative	Al Graf	2,892	
Independence	Al Graf	829	
Stop Common Core	Al Graf	364	
Total	Al Graf (incumbent)	16,968	67.0
Democratic	Deborah Slinkosky	8,365	33.0
Write-in		3	0.0
Total votes		25,336	100.0
Republican hold			

=== 2012 ===
2012 New York State Assembly election, District 17
Party	Candidate	Votes	%
Republican	Al Graf	19,265	
Conservative	Al Graf	4,007	
Independence	Al Graf	1,221	
Total	Al Graf (incumbent)	24,493	58.7
Democratic	Victor Salamone	17,183	41.2
Write-in		29	0.1
Total votes		41,705	100.0
Republican hold			

=== 2010 ===
2010 New York State Assembly election, District 5
Primary election
Party	Candidate	Votes	%
Democratic	Kenneth Mangan	1,575	50.9
Democratic	Ginny Fields (incumbent)	1,519	49.1
Write-in		0	0.0
Total votes		3,094	100
General election
Republican	Al Graf	14,268	
Conservative	Al Graf	3,542	
Total	Al Graf	17,810	49.5
Democratic	Kenneth Mangan	10,588	29.4
Independence	Ginny Fields	6,041	
Working Families	Ginny Fields	1,538	
Total	Ginny Fields (incumbent)	7,579	21.1
Write-in		4	0.0
Total votes		35,981	100.0
Republican gain from Democratic			

== Members ==
- John Cashmore (1923)
