= Elderly Pharmaceutical Insurance Coverage =

American prescription drug insurance

Elderly Pharmaceutical Insurance Coverage (EPIC) ("New York State's Senior Prescription Plan") was designed so that personal/out-of-pocket costs for medicines are reduced or largely paid for program participants by the state. Members are also given assistance with Medicare Part D.

== History ==
Initial public response to the program, when introduced by New York State, had fewer participants than expected. EPIC was established in 1986 to help income-eligible seniors with the high costs of prescription drugs; Paul E. Harenberg, Chairman of the New York State Assembly Committee on Aging, held hearings. It soon became obvious that recent retirees faced a double problem: "sticker shock not only because you are at that age when you start to need more medications, but also because your insurance is picking up less of the cost."

As introduced, eligible seniors pay 40% of a medicine's cost, up to a specified level; beyond that, the state pays 100%. Unlike managed care plans, "it helps people with their prescription drug costs without making them leave their current doctors and join H.M.O.'s." A 2001 Department of Consumer Affairs estimate found that 27% of seniors in New York lack insurance. By 2003, 33 other states had introduced "state pharmacy assistance programs," partly to avoid what The New York Times called the "murky" choice of buying "from Canada and Mexico online or in person."

Medicare-based pharmaceutical coverage is "delivered by private plans that can establish lists of preferred drugs and can steer patients to selected pharmacies" in contrast to how EPIC and some other states "pay for almost any prescription drug and allow beneficiaries to use virtually any pharmacy."

In 1987 Mario Cuomo budgeted $70 million, to begin coverage in October for an estimated 1.2 million elderly. In 2021 the program was still running, with his son as governor.
