= New York's 54th State Senate district =

American legislative district

Senator
Pamela Helming; R–Canandaigua
- Registration: 36.8% Republican; 29.8% Democratic; 24.8% No party preference
- Demographics: 89% White; 3% Black; 4% Hispanic; 2% Asian
- Population (2017): 294,459
- Registered voters: 192,352 (as of 2,019)

New York's 54th State Senate district is one of 63 districts in the New York State Senate. It has been represented by Republican Pamela Helming since 2017, succeeding fellow Republican Michael Nozzolio.

== Geography ==
District 54 covers several counties in the Finger Lakes region, including all of Seneca and Wayne Counties as well as parts of Cayuga, Monroe, Ontario, and Tompkins Counties.

The district overlaps with New York's 24th congressional district and with the 125th, 126th, 130th, 131st, 132nd, and 135th districts of the New York State Assembly.

== Recent election results ==
=== 2026 ===
2026 New York State Senate election, District 54
Primary election
Party	Candidate	Votes	%
Democratic	Michael Mills	5,351	51.4
Democratic	Scott Comegys	5,051	48.5
Write-in		14	0.1
Total votes		10,416	100.0
General election
Republican	Pamela Helming		
Conservative	Pamela Helming		
Total	Pamela Helming (incumbent)		
Democratic	Michael Mills		
Write-in			
Total votes			100.0

=== 2024 ===
2024 New York State Senate election, District 54
Party	Candidate	Votes	%
Republican	Pamela Helming	88,996	
Conservative	Pamela Helming	14,441	
Total	Pamela Helming (incumbent)	103,437	64.5
Democratic	Scott Comegys	56,888	35.5
Write-in		51	0.0
Total votes		160,376	100.0
Republican hold			

=== 2022 ===
2022 New York State Senate election, District 54
Party	Candidate	Votes	%
Republican	Pamela Helming	70,097	
Conservative	Pamela Helming	13,553	
Total	Pamela Helming (incumbent)	83,650	66.5
Democratic	Kenan Baldridge	42,216	33.5
Write-in		27	0.0
Total votes		125,893	100.0
Republican hold			

=== 2020 ===
2020 New York State Senate election, District 54
Party	Candidate	Votes	%
Republican	Pamela Helming	76,760	
Conservative	Pamela Helming	11,483	
Independence	Pamela Helming	2,590	
SAM	Pamela Helming	154	
Total	Pamela Helming (incumbent)	90,987	63.8
Democratic	Shauna O'Toole	51,609	36.2
Write-in		42	0.0
Total votes		142,638	100.0
Republican hold			

=== 2018 ===
2018 New York State Senate election, District 54
Party	Candidate	Votes	%
Republican	Pamela Helming	55,858	
Conservative	Pamela Helming	8,249	
Independence	Pamela Helming	2,566	
Reform	Pamela Helming	550	
Total	Pamela Helming (incumbent)	67,223	62.0
Democratic	Kenan Baldridge	38,808	
Working Families	Kenan Baldridge	1,618	
Women's Equality	Kenan Baldridge	843	
Total	Kenan Baldridge	41,269	38.0
Write-in		20	0.0
Total votes		108,512	100.0
Republican hold			

=== 2016 ===
2016 New York State Senate election, District 54
Primary election
Party	Candidate	Votes	%
Republican	Pamela Helming	3,945	32.5
Republican	Floyd Rayburn	3,735	30.8
Republican	Brian Manktelow	2,123	17.5
Republican	Sean Hanna	1,370	11.3
Republican	Jon Ritter	952	7.9
Write-in		0	0.0
Total votes		12,125	100.0
Reform	Floyd Rayburn (write-in)	4	66.6
Reform	Pamela Helming	2	33.3
Write-in		0	0.0
Total votes		6	100.0
General election
Republican	Pamela Helming	60,405	
Conservative	Pamela Helming	9,311	
Independence	Pamela Helming	4,459	
Total	Pamela Helming	74,175	60.2
Democratic	Kenan Baldridge	40,739	33.0
Reform	Floyd Rayburn	8,350	6.8
Write-in		49	0.0
Total votes		123,313	100.0
Republican hold			

=== 2014 ===
2014 New York State Senate election, District 54
Party	Candidate	Votes	%
Republican	Michael Nozzolio	50,967	
Conservative	Michael Nozzolio	9,817	
Independence	Michael Nozzolio	7,089	
Total	Michael Nozzolio (incumbent)	67,873	99.5
Write-in		352	0.5
Total votes		68,225	100.0
Republican hold			

=== 2012 ===
2012 New York State Senate election, District 54
Party	Candidate	Votes	%
Republican	Michael Nozzolio	73,204	
Conservative	Michael Nozzolio	12,024	
Independence	Michael Nozzolio	11,074	
Total	Michael Nozzolio (incumbent)	96,302	96.6
Write-in		379	0.4
Total votes		96,681	100.0
Republican hold			

=== Federal results in District 54 ===
Year	Office	Results
2020	President	Trump 51.3 – 46.1%
2016	President	Trump 52.3 – 41.6%
2012	President	Obama 49.7 – 48.4%
2012	Senate	Gillibrand 58.0 – 40.0%
