= Dennis O'Doherty =

American veteran and politician (born 1924)

Dennis O'Doherty Sr. (born March 24, 1924) is an American veteran, businessman and former politician. He is known for his distinguished military service during World War II, his contributions to journalism, and his public service in New York State.

== Political career ==
O'Doherty represented New York's 5th State Assembly district in the New York State Assembly.

== Military service ==
O'Doherty received five Bronze Stars for his bravery and contributions to fighting in World War Two.

== Legacy and recognition ==
On May 15, 2018, O'Doherty was inducted into the New York State Senate Veterans Hall of Fame.

Throughout his life, O'Doherty has been an active member of the community, contributing to various charitable and civic causes. His efforts in preserving local history through journalism and his advocacy for veterans' rights and community development have left a lasting impact in Suffolk County and beyond.

New York State Assembly
Preceded by William L. Burns	New York State Assembly; 5th District; 1973–1974	Succeeded by Paul E. Harenberg
