= Al Graf =

American politician and judge

Alfred C. Graf

Suffolk County District Court Judge
- Incumbent
- Assumed office January 1, 2018

Member of the New York State Assembly from the 5th district
- In office January 1, 2011 – December 31, 2017
- Preceded by: Ginny Fields
- Succeeded by: Douglas M. Smith

Personal details
- Born: February 13, 1958 (age 68) Long Island, New York, U.S.
- Party: Republican
- Spouse: Mary Graf
- Children: 3
- Education: SUNY Plattsburgh (B.A.); Touro College (J.D.)

Alfred C. Graf (born February 13, 1958) is an American politician and attorney who served as the New York State Assemblyman for the 5th district from 2011 to 2017. A member of the Republican Party, he represented portions of the towns of Brookhaven and Islip, including Holbrook, Lake Ronkonkoma, Ronkonkoma, Holtsville, Centereach, Selden, parts of Farmingville, Islandia, North Patchogue and Stony Brook in Suffolk County on Long Island. Graf has been a Suffolk County District Court Judge since 2018.

== Life and career ==
Graf was born and raised on Long Island and graduated from Farmingdale High School in 1976. He enlisted in the United States Navy in June 1976 and eventually rose to the rank of Operations Specialist Third Class Petty Officer. Graf received an honorable discharge in June 1980.

After returning to civilian life, Graf joined the New York City Police Department. He worked his way up from patrol to a plainclothes unit and was awarded numerous citations for exceptional police duty before being forced to retire due to an injury. He then worked for Wells Fargo Guard Services as an Accounts Manager.

After moving upstate to Saranac Lake, New York, Graf was elected as Supervisor for the Town of Brighton. After two terms as a town supervisor and at the age of 39, Graf went back to school. He received a bachelor's degree in elementary education from SUNY Plattsburgh and taught in an alternative education program for children. Graf later received a Juris Doctor from Touro Law School.

Graf lives in Holbrook, New York. He and his wife Mary have three children: Charles, Jean Marie, and Caitlin.

== Election history ==
In November 2010, he was elected to the State Assembly after defeating incumbent Assemblywoman Ginny Fields. He was re-elected in 2012, 2014, and 2016.

In November 2017, he was elected to the Suffolk County 5th District Court.

Election History
Office	Year	Election	Results
Suffolk County Legislature, District 8	2003	General	√ Bill Lindsay (D) 61.45% Al Graf (R) 38.55%
Suffolk County Legislature, District 8	2005	General	√ Bill Lindsay (D) 59.06% Al Graf (R) 40.94%
New York State Assembly, District 5	2010	General	√ Al Graf (R) 49.50% Kenneth J. Mangan (D) 29.43% Ginny Fields (I) 21.06%
New York State Assembly, District 5	2012	General	√ Al Graf (R) 58.73% Victor E. Salamone (D) 41.27%
New York State Assembly, District 5	2014	General	√ Al Graf (R) 66.97% Deborah L. Slinkosky (D) 33.03%
New York State Assembly, District 5	2016	General	√ Al Graf (R) 63.84% Deborah L. Slinkosky (D) 34.54% James Smith (L) 1.57%
Suffolk County District Court Judge	2017	General	√ James Malone (C) 47.72% √ Alfred . Graf (R) 29.79% Elizabeth Bloom (D) 22.49%

== New York State Assembly ==
Assemblyman Alfred C. Graf served as the ranking minority member of the New York State Assembly Committee on Codes, and was also a member of the Committees on Education, Judiciary, and Housing.

During the 2013-2014 Legislative Session, Graf was appointed to the New York State Assembly Minority Task Force on Common Core and traveled the state holding hearings on New York State's implementation of the Common Core curriculum. During the 2015-16 Legislative Session, Graf was appointed to the New York State Assembly Minority Task Force on Heroin Addiction and Community Response and travelled the state holding hearings on the heroin epidemic.

Upon his election as District Court Judge, Graf resigned his seat in the New York State Assembly effective January 1, 2018. He was succeeded by his longtime Chief of Staff, Douglas M. Smith, who was overwhelmingly elected in a Special Election held on April 24, 2018.

New York State Assembly
Preceded by Ginny Fields	New York State Assembly, 5th District; January 1, 2011 – December 31, 2017	Succeeded by Douglas M. Smith
