= Paul E. Harenberg =

American politician

Paul E. Harenberg (July 17, 1931 – October 7, 2010) was an American politician from New York. He was a member of the New York State Assembly, representing the 5th Assembly district, from 1975 to 2000.

== Life ==
Harenberg attended Columbia College, where he received a Bachelor of Arts; then Columbia Graduate Faculties, receiving a Masters of Arts in Public Law and Government; followed by post-graduate studies at New York University and Hofstra University. He was awarded a fellowship in Russian at the University of Texas and later at the University of San Francisco. In 1984, Harenberg was awarded a Ph.D. at NYU.

He taught history and government at James Wilson Young High School in Bayport, New York, from 1955 through 1974, and he spent a year in Great Britain as a Fulbright-Hays Exchange Teacher. Then he entered politics as a Democrat, and was elected to the New York State Assembly in 1974. He remained in the Assembly until 2000, sitting in the 181st, 182nd, 183rd, 184th, 185th, 186th, 187th, 188th, 189th, 190th, 191st, 192nd and 193rd New York State Legislatures.

As Chairman of the Subcommittee on Community Aftercare for the Mentally Disabled (Mental Health), Harenberg held public hearings and produced two important reports on the delivery of mental health services in New York State. "Wards of the State" (1977), detailed the deficiencies of the Department of Hygiene in preventing and investigating incidents of patient abuse. One of Harenberg's proposals that was signed into law established the State Commission on the Quality of Care for the Mentally Disabled.

In 1978, Harenberg's report on the dumping of mental patients, "From the Back Wards to the Back Alleys", brought national attention to the problems of deinstitutionalization without aftercare. As a result, an appropriation of over $26 million and other remedial legislation was enacted by the NYS Legislature to deal with this problem and the Community Support Services was established. Harenberg received the Mental Health Advocate Award from the Long Island Council of the Federation of Parents Organizations.

Appointed Chairman of the NYS Assembly Committee on Aging in 1981, Paul Harenberg brought to the job a strong personal commitment to promote the independence and health of older New Yorkers. A longtime advocate of home care and other alternatives to institutional care, Harenberg immediately set out to create a full continuum of services for elderly persons - from income maintenance and tax relief to expanded community and home-based services such as respite care, adult day care, training for informal care givers, and home health care.

Harenberg traveled extensively throughout the state, viewing senior programs and speaking with individual organizations. As Chair of the Committee on Aging, Harenberg held numerous public hearings, beginning in 1981 on such diverse topics as energy needs, elder abuse, long-term care, the status of older women, mandatory Medicare assignment, adult homes, Medigap insurance, and age discrimination in employment. Harenberg also expanded the membership of the Committee's Advisory Council, composed of older persons and their advocates, in an effort to elicit a wider range of ideas for legislation and broader-based support for the Committee's legislative efforts. Through these visits and hearings, and with the advice of its Advisory Council under Harenberg's leadership, the Committee on Aging developed and enacted significant legislation to improve the lives of older persons.

Recognizing the very important role that families play in providing care to older persons, Harenberg, in his first year as Chairman, sponsored experimental legislation that created some of the first respite programs in the nation, assisting family caregivers and improving the quality of life for the dependent elderly persons.

Harenberg led efforts to eliminate age-based discrimination in employment and housing. Additionally, he succeeded in securing passage of a sliding scale of real property tax exemptions for elderly homeowners. Other gains the Committee won for the older New Yorkers in 1984 included the statutory establishment of Enriched Housing programs and further funding increases for Community Services for the Elderly. Creation of the Elderly Pharmaceutical Insurance Coverage Program (EPIC), established to help income-eligible seniors with the high costs of prescription drugs, was achieved in 1986 through Harenberg's persistent leadership and the support of many statewide senior advocacy organizations. A 1996 cost analysis of the EPIC program showed savings of $40 million as a consequence of delayed need for institutionalizing many of New York's elderly.

In addition to his efforts here in New York State, Harenberg has been a strong advocate for New York's elderly at the federal level of government. Strongly critical of federal efforts to cut funding for health care, housing and other senior services, Harenberg was an active delegate at the 1981 White House Conference on Aging and has worked for improved Medicare benefits, as well as for increased funding of the Older Americans Act.

Harenberg was successful in securing enactment of spousal impoverishment legislation, allowing the community spouse of a nursing home resident to retain a considerable portion of the couple's joint income and assets.

In 1987, Harenberg filed state legislation prohibiting physicians from charging more than Medicare's reasonable fee. In 1990, a slightly compromised version of his original bill passed (A.3500-a), which places a limit of 5% on the amount a physician can charge an elderly patient above the Medicare-approved payment amount. Harenberg also pressed for passage in 1990 of the Health Care Proxy Act, protecting the rights of individuals to control decisions about their health care.

Under Harenberg's direction, significant EPIC reform measures (1990) extended this critical program to other moderate-income seniors while enhancing benefits to lower-income seniors was also enacted.

Harenberg was appointed Chair of the Assembly Majority Steering Committee in 1997.

Paul Harenberg married Sylvia McArthur in 1953. They have four children: Paul, Peter, David and Jennifer, as well as five grandchildren: Ashley, Nicholas, Alexandra, Peter and Evan Paul.

Paul E Harenberg died on the morning of Oct 7, 2010 at the age of 79. He had suffered from Alzheimers for several years and in the end was a model example for all the senior advocacy he devoted his life to. Paul lived at home until the end, with primary care administered by his wife of 57 years, Sylvia.

New York State Assembly
Preceded by Dennis O'Doherty	New York State Assembly; 5th District; 1975–2000	Succeeded by Steve Levy
