= Steve Levy (politician) =

American politician (born 1959)

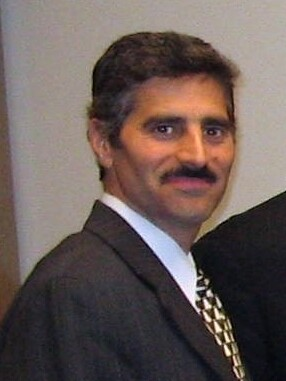
- Levy in 2005

7th County Executive of Suffolk County, New York
- In office January 1, 2004 – December 31, 2011
- Preceded by: Robert J. Gaffney
- Succeeded by: Steve Bellone

Member of the New York State Assembly from the 5th district
- In office 2001–2003
- Preceded by: Paul Harenberg
- Succeeded by: Ginny Fields

Member of the Suffolk County Legislature from the 8th district
- In office 1985–2000
- Succeeded by: William J. Lindsay

Personal details
- Born: Steven A. Levy; August 25, 1959 (age 67) Glendale, Queens New York City
- Party: Republican (was Democratic until 2010)
- Spouse: Colleen West
- Education: State University of New York at Stony Brook; St. John's University School of Law
- Website: Official website

Steven A. Levy (pronounced LEE-vee; born August 25, 1959) is an American politician and lawyer who served as the seventh County Executive of Suffolk County, New York, elected on November 4, 2003. Originally a fiscally conservative Democrat, Levy joined the Republican Party in an unsuccessful bid for the Republican nomination for governor.

== Personal life ==
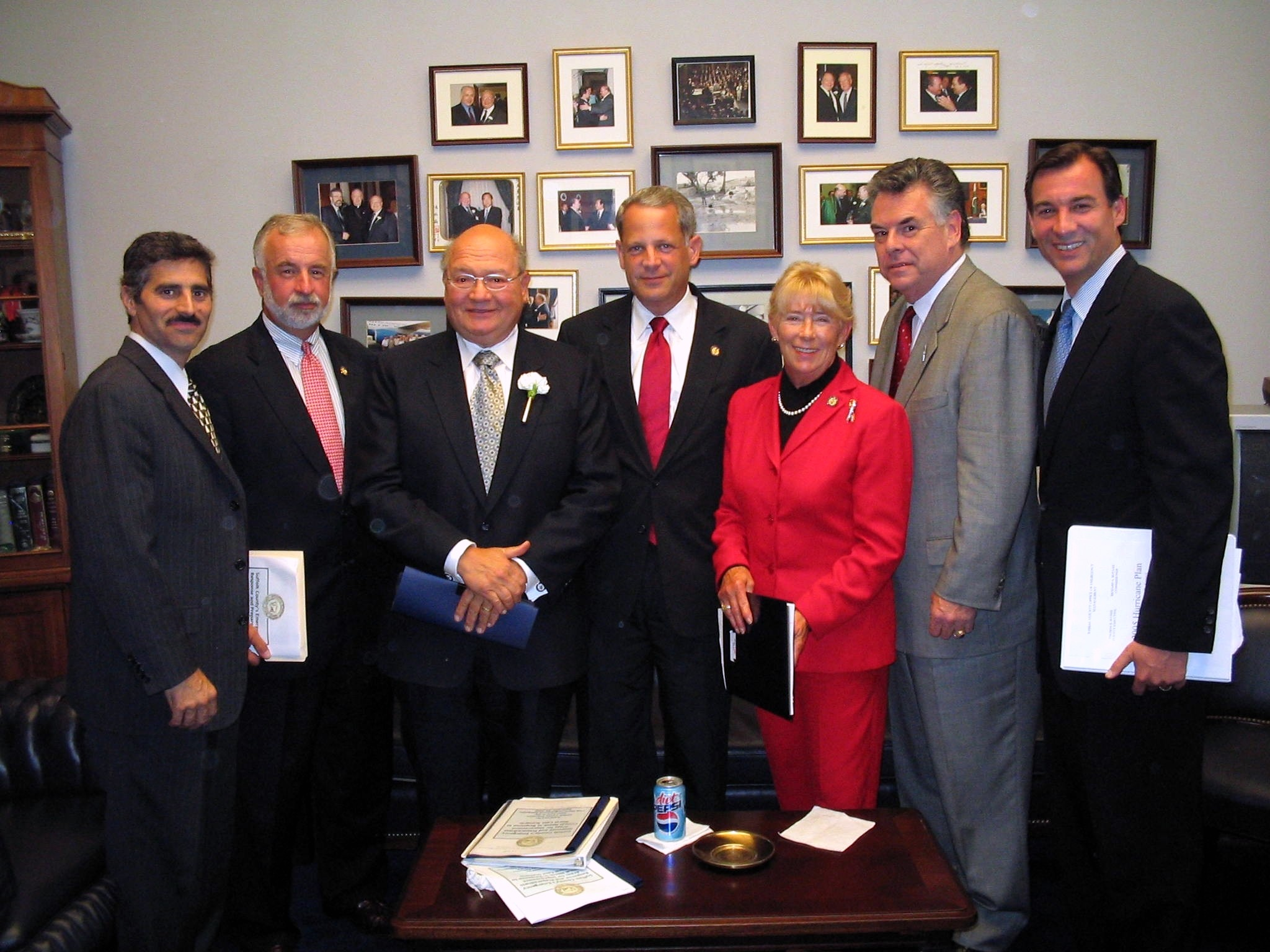
Steve Levy with New York politicians in 2005

Steve Levy was born in Glendale, Queens. Along with his brother and sister, he was raised in Holbrook, New York by his father Andrew Levy, who owned a Brooklyn appliance store, and his mother, Marie Cavalcante Levy. His father was Jewish, descended from immigrants from Alsace-Lorraine, and his mother was Italian-American and Catholic (Levy was reared as a Catholic). He is a graduate of Sachem High School in Holbrook (1977), the State University of New York at Stony Brook (1981, magna cum laude) and St. John's University School of Law (1984). Levy married Colleen West on December 2, 1994, at St. Ann's Episcopal Church in Sayville, New York. They live in Bayport, New York with her children from a previous marriage.

== Politics ==
In 1984, Levy was elected to the Suffolk County Legislature where he served for 15 years (1985–2000). In 2000, he was elected to the New York State Assembly, where he represented the 5th Assembly District from 2001 to 2003.

Levy, then a Democrat who identified as fiscally conservative, ran for the office of Suffolk County Executive in 2003, winning the election against Republican opponent Edward Romaine. Levy entered office in 2004. On November 6, 2007, he was overwhelmingly re-elected to a second term with cross-endorsement and receiving 96% of the vote.

As County Executive, Levy invested $15 million in affordable housing and infrastructure aid. Levy directed increased funding for solar energy projects, clean-fuel cars, and sewer construction. The county spent $42 million to double the sewer capacity for the Hauppauge industrial area, and $8 million in aid for sewer improvements and affordable housing for more than 500 new apartments. These investments sparked downtown revitalization in Patchogue.

Levy transformed Suffolk's long-dormant Gabreski Airport in Westhampton into a business park that is projected to create as many as 1,000 jobs. In addition, he helped resolve a land dispute that cleared the way for Canon's US headquarters to relocate its North American headquarters to Melville, creating over 2,000 new jobs for the county.

Under Levy’s tenure, Suffolk County experienced a double-digit decrease in murders, burglaries and other violent crimes, which Levy attributed to an increased police presence on the street.

The Levy Administration kept general fund taxes flat and lowered the county's share of the overall property tax bill from 13 percent to 10 percent. Throughout his tenure, Suffolk County’s bond rating rose seven times, to record levels.

Levy advocated for preserving open space to secure Suffolk’s clean drinking water. In support of Suffolk County’s tourism industry, he invested in conserving the county’s rustic nature and preserved over 70 of its farms.

Reflecting concerns of many residents in the county about rising numbers of undocumented immigrants, Levy has promoted policies to enforce immigration laws, including employer verification of worker status and restrictions on drivers’ licenses for undocumented immigrants.

== Run for Governor ==
On March 19, 2010, Levy announced that he would switch political parties, seeking the Republican Party's nomination for New York Governor, competing with former New York Congressman Rick Lazio and Buffalo developer Carl Paladino for the party nomination. Though he changed his voter registration to the Republican Party, this change came after the deadline for making such a change. For legal purposes, Levy remained a Democrat until November 2010, with the registration change taking effect after Election Day.

Levy's platform focused on getting the state's financial house in order and reining in spending, while decreasing property taxes. He also called for the creation of an independent control board, much like the ones formed by the state for counties who are in financial crisis, to help address the state of New York's fiscal woes.

Despite the support of state Republican chairman Edward F. Cox, Levy failed to gain the necessary support at the New York State Republican Convention for a "Wilson Pakula," the document necessary for non-party members to seek a party's nomination. Authorizing such a document requires a majority weighted vote of the attending members of the party; Levy received 42 percent, which barred him from entering the Republican primary, either by nomination or by petition. As a result, Levy was eliminated from the race.

== See also ==
- 2010 New York gubernatorial election

New York State Assembly
Preceded by Paul Harenberg	New York State Assembly for 5th District; 2001–2003	Succeeded by Ginny Fields
Political offices
Preceded by Robert J. Gaffney	County Executive of Suffolk County, New York; 2004–2011	Succeeded by Steve Bellone
