= Anna Kelles =

American politician from New York

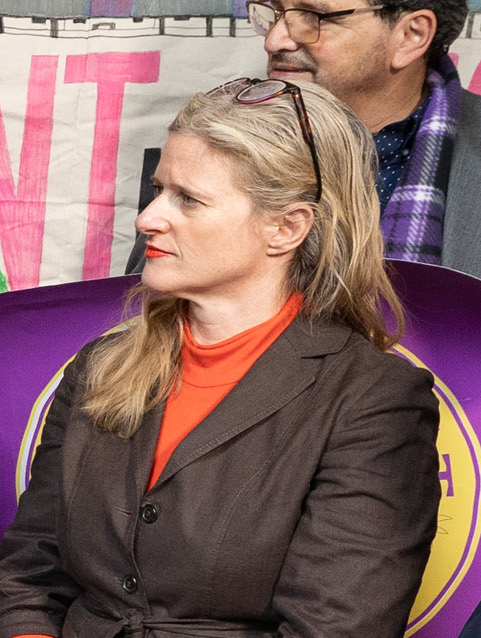
- Kelles in 2025

Member of the New York State Assembly from the 125th district
- Incumbent
- Assumed office January 6, 2021
- Preceded by: Barbara Lifton

Personal details
- Born: April 11, 1974 (age 52) Trumansburg, New York, U.S.
- Party: Democratic
- Education: Binghamton University (BA); University of North Carolina at Chapel Hill (PhD)
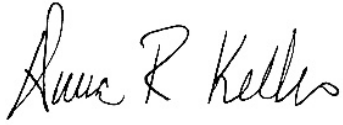
- Signature
- Website: |Official website

Anna Kelles (born April 11, 1974) is an American Democratic politician who currently represents New York State Assembly district 125, which includes Tompkins County and parts of Cortland County, including the higher education institutions of Cornell University, Ithaca College, Tompkins-Cortland Community College, and the State University of New York at Cortland.

== Early life ==
Kelles spent her childhood in Trumansburg, New York. She earned a bachelor's degree in biology and environmental studies from Binghamton University in 1997 and a doctorate in nutritional epidemiology from the University of North Carolina at Chapel Hill in 2008.

Kelles worked in Ecuador between her degrees as a high school biology teacher and Amazon basin ecological guide. After earning her Ph.D., she taught nutritional science at Ithaca College and Cornell University before starting a private practice in nutrition and wellness.

== Career ==
Kelles served in the Tompkins County Legislature 2015–2020, where she drafted legislation on subjects including public health and environmentalism.

Kelles was elected November 12, 2020, defeating Libertarian Matthew McIntyre in the general election race to represent New York Assembly District 125. Kelles considers herself a progressive democrat. Her platform includes universal health care, racial justice, economic recovery, universal child care, universal housing, criminal justice reform, and food security. She also supports mandatory vaccination, having campaigned in the midst of the COVID-19 pandemic.

Kelles visited the Auburn Correctional Facility in February 2021 in order to "bear witness" to conditions at the prison, one of the oldest in the United States. She criticized the small cells and the mental health implications of extended solitary confinement. She and other legislators advocated for the Justice Roadmap, which includes measures to reform solitary confinement and ensure fair and timely parole. She joined several advocacy groups in this position, including New York Communities for Change.

Kelles was among a number of New York State politicians to criticize Governor Andrew Cuomo after allegations were published that he had sexually harassed several women, first calling for him to resign if found guilty by an investigation led by State Attorney General Letitia James, then calling for him to resign immediately, signing on to a letter along with 58 other Democrats in statewide elected offices. She and others also criticized Cuomo for the New York COVID-19 nursing home scandal, as it had been found that data on COVID-19 deaths in nursing homes had been altered.

Kelles is proposing an Earned Time act to shorten sentences for good behavior of prisoners and a Save Journalism Act to combat monopoly practices and to promote local media and newspapers across New York.

In May 2023, after testifying in front of the Pennsylvania House of Representatives on cryptocurrency, of which she is critical of due to environmental concerns, her twitter account was hacked to promote cryptocurrency.

Following a September 2026 lawsuit filing on accusations of rape in a fraternity house at Cornell University, Kelles was named to a working group examining New York's sexual assault laws.

=== Committee assignments ===
As of 2026, Kelles serves on the following committees within the New York State Assembly:

- Committee on Agriculture
- Committee on Correction
- Committee on Environmental Conservation
- Committee on Health
- Committee on Higher Education

New York State Assembly
Preceded by Barbara Lifton	New York State Assembly, 125th District; January 6, 2021 – present	Incumbent
