= Ginny Fields =

American politician

Member of the New York State Assembly from the 5th district
- In office 2004–2010
- Preceded by: Steve Levy
- Succeeded by: Al Graf

Member of the Suffolk County Legislature
- In office 2000–2003

Personal details
- Born: Nov. 30, 1945 (age 80) Newport News, Virginia
- Party: Republican (Democrat until 2015)
- Spouse: Walter
- Children: two sons
- Occupation: health care administrator
- Education: high school

Virginia Fields (born November 30, 1945) is an American former politician who represented the 5th District in the New York State Assembly, which includes parts of the Long Island towns of Brookhaven and Islip, including Centereach, Farmingville, Fire Island, Holbrook, Holtsville, Lake Ronkonkoma, Selden, Bayport, Bohemia, Oakdale, Ronkonkoma, Sayville, and West Sayville.

== Career ==
Fields was chosen to represent District 5 in a special election held on March 9, 2004, due to incumbent Steve Levy's resignation to become Suffolk County Executive. She was re-elected in 2006 and again in 2008, when she defeated Republican opponent John Bugler. In September 2010, she lost the Democratic primary race to Ken Mangan. Fields ran in the 2010 general election on the Independence and Working Families party lines, but was defeated by Republican Al Graf.

Fields previously served as a lawmaker in the Suffolk County Legislature (2000–2003), where she chaired the Health Committee. Prior to her election to the legislature she served as a health care administrator for 37 years.

In 2015, Fields left the Democratic Party and registered as a Republican.

== Personal life ==
Fields resides in Oakdale, New York. She and her husband Walter have two grown sons.

New York State Assembly
Preceded by Steve Levy	New York State Assembly for 5th District; 2004–2010	Succeeded by Alfred C. Graf
