= Sam MacNeil =

American basketball coach and politician (1925–2008)

Biographical details
- Born: April 5, 1925; Le Roy, New York, U.S.
- Died: October 30, 2008 (aged 83); Franklin, Tennessee, U.S.

Playing career

Basketball
- 1949–1951: Cornell

Coaching career (HC unless noted)
- 1954–1959: Cornell (Freshmen)
- 1959–1968: Cornell

Head coaching record
- Overall: 139–79

Member of the New York State Assembly
- In office January 1, 1979 – December 31, 1988
- Preceded by: Gary A. Lee
- Succeeded by: Martin A. Luster
- Constituency: 128th district (1979–1982); 125th district (1983–1988)

Personal details
- Party: Republican

Hugh Samuel MacNeil (April 5, 1925 – October 30, 2008) was an American basketball player and coach for the Cornell Big Red men's basketball team, as well as a politician who was a member of the New York State Assembly.

== Playing career ==
MacNeil was born in Le Roy, New York and grew up in Williamsville, New York, where he was a three sport athlete in high school. During World War II, he was a United States Merchant Marine radio communications officer in the Pacific Theatre. After the war, he spent one semester at Buffalo State College before transferring to Cornell University. He was a guard for the Big Red basketball team from 1949 to 1951 and played a major role on the 1950-51 squad that won a school record 20 games. He was also a member of the Cornell Big Red baseball team during the 1950 and 1951 seasons.

== Coaching ==
After graduation, he taught high school in Geneseo, New York. In 1954, he returned to Cornell as the freshmen men's basketball coach. He was promoted to head coach in 1959. During his tenure, Cornell did not have a losing record and scored upsets over Illinois, Kentucky, and Ohio State. His 1964–65 team won a school-record 15 consecutive games. In his nine seasons as head coach, MacNeil compiled a record of 139 wins and 79 losses.

== Politics ==
After leaving coaching, MacNeil owned a small business and pursued a career in politics. He was a member of the Tompkins County Board of Representatives from 1970 to 1978 and was chairman of the board from 1976 to 1978. From 1979 to 1988, MacNeil was a member of the New York State Assembly.

== Later life ==
In 1989, MacNeil retired to Ocean Springs, Mississippi. In 2004, he moved to Franklin, Tennessee to be closer to his children. He died on October 30, 2008 at the age of 83. He was survived by his wife of 60 years and four children.
