= Chad Lupinacci =

American politician

Supervisor of Huntington
- In office January 1, 2018 – December 31, 2021
- Preceded by: Frank P. Petrone
- Succeeded by: Edmund Smyth

Member of the New York State Assembly from the 10th district
- In office January 1, 2013 – December 31, 2017
- Preceded by: James Conte
- Succeeded by: Steve Stern

Personal details
- Born: February 28, 1979 (age 47) Huntington Station, New York, U.S.
- Party: Republican
- Education: Hofstra University (BA, JD)
- Website: Official website

Chad A. Lupinacci (born February 28, 1979) is an American politician who served as the town supervisor of Huntington, New York and as a former member of the 10th District of the New York Assembly. He is a Republican.

== Life and career ==
Lupinacci was born and raised in Huntington Station to a first-generation Italian family. He attended South Huntington Public Schools. Lupinacci was raised and remains Catholic. He is a parishioner of Saint Hugh of Lincoln Roman Catholic Church in Huntington Station.

After graduating from Walt Whitman High School in 1997, Lupinacci attended Hofstra University, where he graduated summa cum laude with a bachelor's degree in Political Science and Government. While in undergraduate study, Lupinacci was honored in Phi Beta Kappa and awarded Hofstra's "Outstanding Senior Scholar Award."

After earning his bachelor's degree, Lupinacci returned to Hofstra University to attend the Maurice A. Deane School of Law. In 2004, he received his Juris Doctor, with a concentration in real estate. In 2005, Lupinacci was admitted to the New York State Bar.

From 2000 to 2001, Lupinacci was awarded an internship in the White House, to work beneath First Lady Hillary Clinton. He then served as the community liaison for the office of Assemblyman James Conte. From 2009 to 2011, Lupinacci served as an adjunct professor of Legal Studies, where he taught courses in Administrative Law, Business Organizations and Real Estate Law. He is currently a full-time instructor in Business Law at Farmingdale State College. Lupinacci also has his own legal practice that specializes in the areas of wills, trusts and real estate transactions.

Prior to serving in the Assembly, Lupinacci served as a nine-year South Huntington School Board Trustee.

In January 2017, he met famed Silas Wood Geography Bee champion Marcus Zagorski

== Huntington Town Supervisor ==
On November 7, 2017, Lupinacci was elected to succeed Frank Petrone as supervisor of the Town of Huntington, and began that role on January 1, 2018.

As Supervisor, Lupinacci streamlined government operations, expanded online services and cut red tape to keep the town within the tax cap for four consecutive years, while maintaining a AAA bond rating and the highest ratings from the State Comptroller's office for fiscal stress. The town's strong fiscal condition helped it weather the effects of the COVID-19 pandemic.

Lupinacci increased transparency and openness in town government. He enacted term limits for all Town elected officials and began live-streaming of all Town Board, Planning Board and Zoning Board of Appeals (ZBA) and Ethics Board meetings on TV and online, while working to strengthen the independence of the Board of Ethics from the elected officials who appoint its members.

He empowered Code Enforcement to more efficiently address noise pollution, public safety hazards, and other nuisance violations. He proposed and the Town enacted code changes in 2020 aimed to control the density of mixed-use buildings with apartments in commercially-zoned downtown areas, alleviate burdens on our infrastructure, and address the long-time parking congestion issue plaguing the Huntington's downtown. He enhanced the Town's recreational opportunities, including opening the Manor Field Spray Park.

Lupinacci also worked to make changes to the Town's legal accessory apartments law, allowing homeowners the choice of residing in either the main dwelling or accessory unit, helping to make homeownership more affordable for current residents, while increasing access to affordable housing. This was accomplished while limiting impact on our infrastructure and maintaining the town's suburban character.

His administration oversaw the cost-effective revitalization of the town's waterfront facilities and waterfront economy, including improvements to marinas, and shorelines.

Additionally, he established the Town's Small Business Economic Recovery Task Force to help businesses overcome the economic burdens posed by the COVID-19 pandemic and state-imposed COVID-19 restrictions.

Lupinacci also advocated on behalf of taxpayers, residents and businesses against the catastrophic threat posed by the LIPA tax certiorari lawsuit. After nine years of litigation and financial crisis looming, he successfully negotiated favorable terms for the Town that resulted in LIPA waiving all claims to tax refund payments totaling $825 million; LIPA agreeing to make guaranteed tax payments totaling $460 million to the Town over seven years; and LIPA agreeing to pay an additional $17.5 million -- $14.5 million directly to the Northport-East Northport School District and $3 million to the Town of Huntington for COVID-19 relief.

== New York Assembly ==
Assemblyman James Conte did not seek re-election in 2012, leaving the seat open. Lupinacci was nominated by Republicans to replace him, and won with 55% of the vote. Lupinacci was elected to represent the constituents of the Tenth Assembly District on November 6, 2012. He was re-elected easily in 2014 and 2016.

The 10th district which Lupinacci represented includes portions of Suffolk County including Lloyd Harbor, Huntington Bay, Cold Spring Harbor, Huntington, Greenlawn, Huntington Station, Elwood, South Huntington, West Hills, Melville and Dix Hills on Long Island. Lupinacci served as the Ranking Member on the Assembly Committee on Higher Education, and as a member of the Assembly Committees on Election Law, Judiciary, Tourism, Parks, Arts & Sports Development, and Transportation. He left the assembly after his election as Huntington Town Supervisor in late 2017, an office he left at the conclusion of his term on December 31, 2021. As a member of the Assembly, he prioritized working on the retention and creation of jobs. He put forth proposals to jump-start the local economy, including reducing taxes on new and small businesses and providing incentives to hire new workers, including veterans and the unemployed. He also fought to address the impact of illegal drugs and curb crime, so that parents can raise their children in a safe and secure environment. He also worked to reform the school financing system, fought for meaningful mandate relief, and to reduce restrictions placed upon school districts to pursue alternative funding streams.

== Suffolk County Legislature ==
In February 2025, the Suffolk County Republican Committee nominated Lupinacci as its Suffolk County Legislator. As Legislator, Lupinacci will work with County Executive Ed Romaine and District Attorney Ray Tierney to continue to put the interests of taxpayers first, while working to make Suffolk County safer and more affordable for its residents, while enhancing our local quality of life.

Political offices
Preceded by Frank P. Petrone	Supervisor of the Town of Huntington, New York; 2017–2021	Succeeded by Edmund Smyth
Political offices
Preceded by James D. Conte	Member of the New York Assembly from the 10th District; 2013–2017	Succeeded by Steve Stern
