= Thomas McKevitt =

American politician

Tom McKevitt

Member of the New York State Assembly from the 17th district
- In office February 28, 2006 – December 31, 2017
- Preceded by: Maureen O'Connell
- Succeeded by: John Mikulin

Personal details
- Born: April 28, 1971 (age 55) Oceanside, New York
- Party: Republican
- Spouse: Samantha McGill
- Children: Connor and Meagan Mckevitt
- Education: Hofstra University; Hofstra Law School
- Profession: lawyer, politician
- Website: Official website

Thomas McKevitt (born April 28, 1971) is an American politician who represented District 17 in the New York Assembly from 2006 to 2017, which includes large portions of Nassau County, New York.

McKevitt was born in East Meadow, New York and is a lifetime resident of Nassau County. He received a B.A. from Hofstra University, where he graduated summa cum laude in 1993. McKevitt earned his Juris Doctor from the Hofstra Law School in 1996. He is a member of the New York State Bar Association and the American Bar Association.

Formerly the Deputy Attorney for Hempstead, New York, as well as a staffer for former Senator Alfonse D'Amato and State Senator Kemp Hannon, McKevitt was chosen in a special election held on February 28, 2006 to replace outgoing Assemblywoman Maureen O'Connell, who is now the Nassau County Clerk.

McKevitt and Samantha McGill were married in July 2001. He and his wife reside in East Meadow, New York with their two children.

== Election results ==
- February 2006 special election, NYS Assembly, 17th AD

Thomas McKevitt (REP - IND - CON)	...	3,561
Zahid Ali Syed (DEM - WOR)	...	1,691

- November 2006 general election, NYS Assembly, 17th AD

Thomas McKevitt (REP - IND - CON)	...	19,048
Dolores D. Sedacca (DEM - WOR)	...	16,622

- November 2008 general election, NYS Assembly, 17th AD

Thomas McKevitt (REP - IND - CON)	...	31,803
John L. Pinto (DEM)	...	23,321

- November 2010 general election, NYS Assembly, 17th AD

Thomas McKevitt (REP - IND - CON)	...	24,766
Thomas J. Devaney (DEM - WOR)	...	15,060

New York State Assembly
Preceded by Maureen O'Connell	New York State Assembly, 17th District; 2006–2017	Succeeded by John Mikulin
