= Barbara Lifton =

American politician

Member of the New York State Assembly from the 125th district
- In office January 1, 2003 – December 31, 2020
- Preceded by: Martin A. Luster
- Succeeded by: Anna Kelles

Personal details
- Born: November 26, 1950 (age 75) Geneseo, New York, U.S.
- Party: Democratic
- Children: two
- Education: SUNY Geneseo
- Profession: teacher, politician
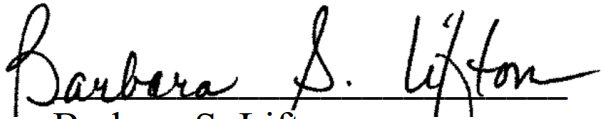
- Signature
- Website: Official website

Barbara S. Lifton (born November 26, 1950) is a former Democratic member of the New York State Assembly representing Assembly District 125, which includes Tompkins County in its entirety, as well as the City of Cortland and towns of Cortlandville and Virgil in Cortland County.

She attended SUNY College at Geneseo, receiving a B.A. in English a teacher certification in 1973, and an M.A. in English in 1985. Lifton was an English teacher in the Geneseo Central School from 1976 to 1982, then in the Ithaca public school system from 1985 to 1988. For fourteen years before entering the Assembly she served as the chief of staff to former Assemblyman Martin A. Luster. She also served for two years on the Cornell/Community Waste Management Committee.

Lifton was first elected to the State Assembly in November 2002. She ran uncontested in the November 2008 general election and won the November 2010 general election with 62 percent of the vote.

Fellow assemblyman Joseph Morelle, the chairman of the Monroe County Democratic Party, attempted to recruit Lifton, among other candidates, in an effort to run against Republican Tom Reed for the vacant congressional seat formerly held by Eric Massa, who resigned in disgrace from the United States Congress, although Lifton lived outside the boundaries of that district. She had stated that she considered the overture, as she had long wanted to have a say in global issues, but ultimately chose not to run. She continued in the state Assembly until announcing she would not seek re-election in 2020.

Lifton resides in Ithaca, New York. She has two children and five grandchildren.

New York State Assembly
Preceded by Martin A. Luster	New York State Assembly, 125th District; 2003–2020	Succeeded by Anna Kelles
