= John Mikulin =

American politician

Member of the New York State Assembly from the 17th district
- Incumbent
- Assumed office April 30, 2018
- Preceded by: Thomas McKevitt

Personal details
- Born: April 7, 1988 (age 38) Bethpage, New York, U.S.
- Party: Republican
- Education: St. John's University (New York City) (B.A./M.A.) Touro Law School (J.D.)

John Mikulin (born April 7, 1988) is a member of the New York State Assembly representing the 17th district, which includes portions of the towns of Hempstead and Oyster Bay in Nassau County on Long Island. A Republican, Mikulin was first elected in a 2018 special election.

Mikulin was born and raised in Bethpage, New York. An attorney, he attended St. John's University (New York City) where he attained a B.A., a M.A. and his J.D at Touro Law School. Prior to serving in the legislature, Mikulin was President of the Island Trees Library Board and served as the Deputy Town Attorney in the Town of Hempstead.

In 2017, Assemblyman Thomas McKevitt opted to run for the Nassau County Legislature, and won. Required to vacate his seat, a special election was called for April 24, 2018. Mikulin soon after was nominated by local Republicans to run for the seat. A safely Republican seat, Mikulin went on to defeat Democrat Matthew W. Malin with 63% of the vote. He was easily reelected to a full term in 2018.

Mikulin and his wife, Corinne, reside in Bethpage with their two children.
