= Pam Helming =

American politician (born 1962)

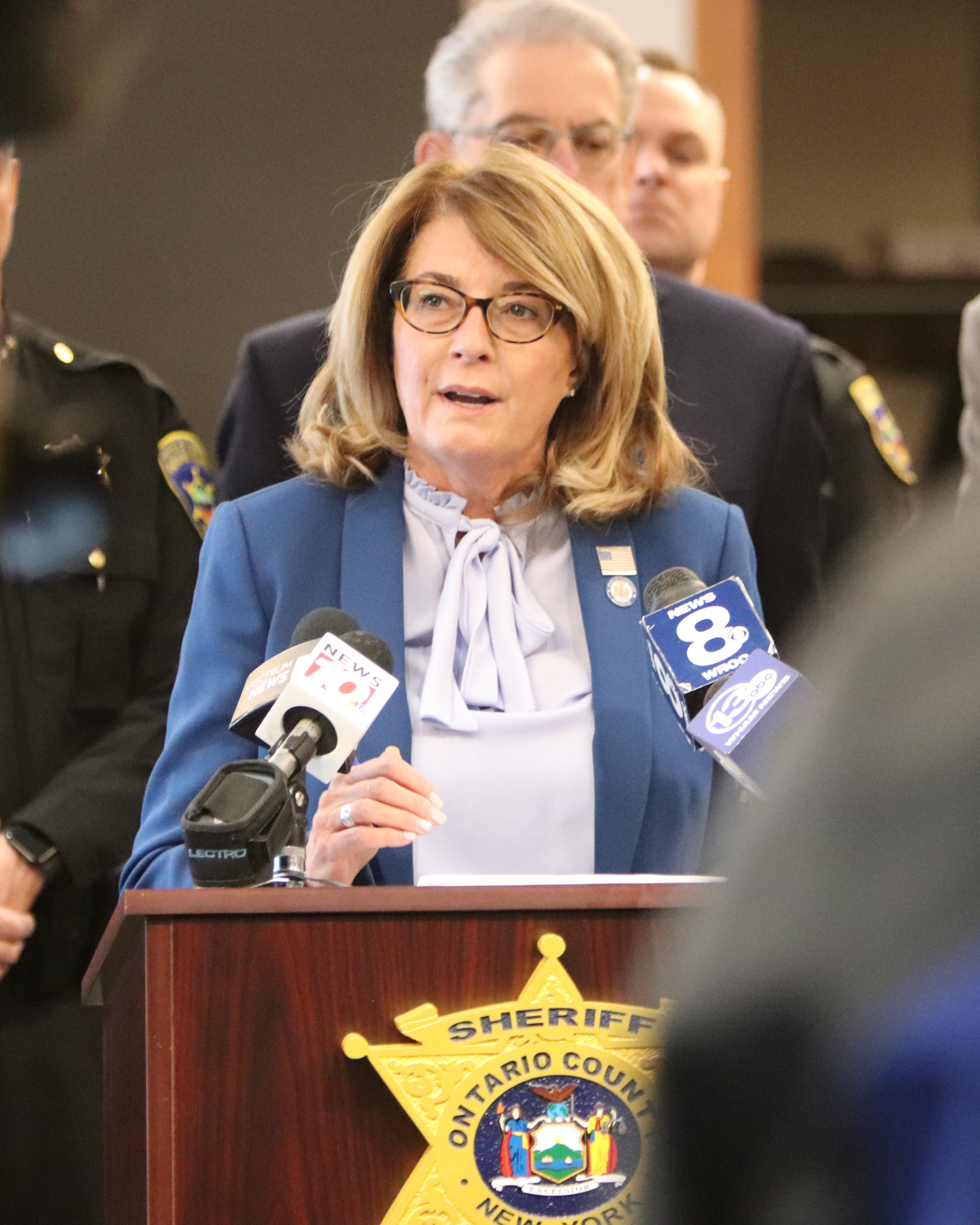
- Helming in February 2025

Member of the New York State Senate from the 54th district
- Incumbent
- Assumed office January 1, 2017
- Preceded by: Michael Nozzolio

Personal details
- Born: Pamela A. Turnbull; February 18, 1962 (age 64)
- Party: Republican
- Spouse: Gary Helming
- Children: 2
- Education: Hiram College (BA)
- Website: Official website

Pamela A. Helming (born February 18, 1962) is an American politician from the state of New York. A Republican, Helming has represented Senate District 54 in the New York State Senate since 2017. Prior to her election to the State Senate, Helming served as the town supervisor for Canandaigua, New York. She was elected to that post in 2014.

== Life and career ==
A graduate of Hiram College, Helming's career has been focused on individuals with developmental disabilities, including those who reside in group homes. She and her husband, Gary Helming, have resided in the Canandaigua, New York area for over thirty years and have raised their two children there.

Helming was first elected to local office in 2010 as a town councilperson. In 2014, she was elected Canandaigua Town Supervisor, which elevated her to the county level of government.

== New York State Senate ==
In 2016, twenty-four year incumbent Sen. Michael Nozzolio announced his impending retirement from the State Senate due to health concerns. Sen. Nozzolio represented Senate District 54. Although competitive on paper, Senate District 54 was seen as friendly to Republicans. Five candidates sought the GOP nomination for State Senate in Senate District 54 in 2016. In a tight race with very low turnout, Helming received a plurality of 33% of the vote and won the primary by 210 votes.

In the 2016 general election, Helming faced Democrat Kenan S. Baldridge as well as Floyd G. Rayburn, who had come in second to Helming in the Republican primary but continued his candidacy on the Reform Party line. Helming prevailed with over 60% of the vote.

Helming was subsequently re-elected in 2018, 2020, 2022, and 2024, each time with over 60% of the vote.

== See also ==
- List of New York state senators

Political offices
Preceded by Michael Nozzolio	New York State Senate, 54th District; 2017–present	Incumbent
