= Steve Stern (politician) =

American politician (born 1968)

Member of the New York State Assembly from the 10th district
- Incumbent
- Assumed office April 25, 2018
- Preceded by: Chad Lupinacci

Personal details
- Born: October 30, 1968 (age 57)
- Party: Democratic
- Education: Tulane University (B.A.); Cooley Law School (J.D.)
- Website: Official website

Steven H. Stern (born October 30, 1968) is an American politician currently serving as a New York State Assembly member representing the 10th district, which includes portions of the towns of Babylon and Huntington in Suffolk County. A Democrat, Stern was first elected in 2018 through a special election.

== Early life and education ==
Stern is from Holbrook, New York. He graduated from Tulane University and received his Juris Doctor degree from Cooley Law School, later becoming a partner at Davidow and Davidow in Islandia, New York where he focused on elder law.

== Political career ==
In 2005, Stern ran for the Suffolk County Legislature, and was reelected five times, serving until 2018.

When Congressman Steve Israel retired in 2016, Stern ran in the open Democratic primary to represent New York's 3rd congressional district in the United States House of Representatives, but lost the primary election to Tom Suozzi.

In 2018, Stern was recruited to run and won a special election to succeed Chad Lupinacci in the New York State Assembly, becoming the first Democrat to win the district in 40 years. He was re-elected in the 2018 general election with 59.9% of the vote. He ran for re-election again in the 2020 general election. He was re-elected to his second full term with 56.4% of the vote. He was again re-elected in 2022.

Stern sits on the Aging, Banks, Economic Development, Job Creation, Commerce and Industry, Energy, Insurance, and Veterans' Affairs committees. He currently lives in Dix Hills, New York.

New York State Assembly
Preceded by Chad Lupinacci	Member of the New York Assembly from the 10th District; 2018–present	Incumbent
