= Jim Gaughran =

American politician (born 1957)

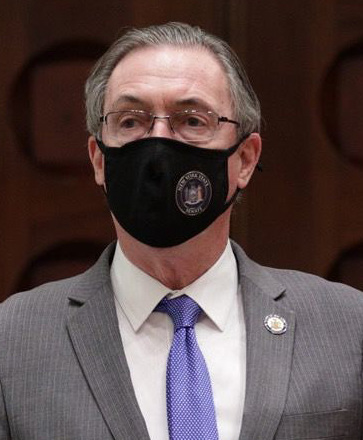

Member of the New York State Senate from the 5th district
- In office January 1, 2019 – December 31, 2022
- Preceded by: Carl Marcellino
- Succeeded by: Mario Mattera (Redistricting)

Personal details
- Born: James F. Gaughran; January 5, 1957 (age 69) Dix Hills, New York, U.S.
- Party: Democratic
- Spouse: Carol
- Children: 2
- Education: Stony Brook University (BA); Hofstra University (JD)
- Website: State Senate website Campaign website

James F. Gaughran (born January 5, 1957) is an American attorney and politician from Suffolk County, New York, who served as a member of the New York State Senate from the 5th district. The district is located around the border of Nassau County and Suffolk County, encompassing the town of Huntington and the northern part of the town of Oyster Bay. Gaughran is a member of the Democratic Party.

Gaughran served as the chair of the Suffolk County Water Authority from 2010 to 2018. He previously served as a member of the Suffolk County Legislature from 1988 to 1993, and as a member of the Huntington Town Board from 1984 to 1987.

In 2018, Gaughran was elected to the New York State Senate from the 5th district, defeating the long-time Republican incumbent, Carl Marcellino. He took office on January 1, 2019.

== Early life and education ==
Gaughran was raised in Dix Hills, New York, and attended Half Hollow Hills High School. He earned a Bachelor of Arts degree from Stony Brook University, where he majored in political science. Subsequently, he earned a Juris Doctor degree from Hofstra University School of Law.

== Early political career ==
=== Huntington Town Board (1984–1987) ===
Gaughran was elected to the Huntington Town Board in 1983, at the age of 26. He became the youngest member of the Town Board in the history of the town.

During his tenure, Gaughran was the lone Democrat on the Town Board. He authored bills creating municipal solid waste districts and enacting environmental protections.

=== Suffolk County Legislature (1988–1993) ===
In 1987, Gaughran was elected to the Suffolk County Legislature from the 17th legislative district.

Gaughran authored a charter amendment which reduced the Legislature's authority to increase spending by adding "pet projects" to the budget; the amendment was approved by voters in a referendum. He also cosponsored a water protection bill preserving numerous critical areas in the county, a "crack house" law targeting drug dealers, as well as reforms to the Suffolk County Police Department.

=== Suffolk County Water Authority (2008–2018) ===
Gaughran was confirmed by the Suffolk County Legislature to the Suffolk County Water Authority (SCWA) for a five-year term in March 2008. He was reappointed by the Legislature in March 2013 and March 2018.

Following the retirement of SCWA chair (and former interim Suffolk County Executive) Michael A. LoGrande in May 2010, Gaughran was appointed as the new SCWA chair. As chair, he implemented reforms emphasizing accountability and transparency. He also reduced the payroll of the SCWA by 6% over four years.

After his election to the New York State Senate in 2018, Gaughran resigned as SCWA chair. He was succeeded by fellow SCWA board member (and former Suffolk County Executive) Patrick G. Halpin.

=== Suffolk County Comptroller election (2014) ===
Gaughran ran for comptroller of Suffolk County in 2014, losing the general election to county legislator John M. Kennedy, Jr. by 6 percentage points.

== New York State Senate (2019–present) ==
=== Elections ===
==== 1992 election ====
Gaughran first ran for the New York State Senate from the 5th district in 1992; his opponent in the general election was the long-time Republican incumbent, Ralph J. Marino.

The 5th district "straddles the Nassau-Suffolk border", and includes the town of Huntington and the northern part of the town of Oyster Bay. Thus, the district includes all or parts of the hamlets of Glen Cove, Syosset, Jericho, Northport, Commack, Dix Hills, Melville, and Plainview.

In December 1991, Marino, who was the senate majority leader at the time, became known for his "budget-wrangling" which led to the infamous "Hamlet on the Hudson" incident, in which Gov. Mario Cuomo kept a plane bound for New Hampshire idling on a tarmac on the last day to file for the 1992 first-in-the-nation presidential primary in that state, while he tried to negotiate a state budget with the Republican-controlled senate. Although he had been perceived as a frontrunner for the 1992 Democratic presidential nomination, Cuomo declined to run for president, saying that he was "willing" but not "able" to campaign due to the unresolved state budget crisis.

The 1992 campaign was extremely bitter, with Marino accusing Gaughran of improperly conspiring with a fiscally conservative group called Pack-Up (an acronym for "Political Action Committee to Kick out Unproductive Politicians"), and Gaughran accusing Marino of using state funds to finance the distribution of his campaign mailings. The campaign was the most expensive state senate campaign up to that point, eclipsing the previous record of $910,000 set in 1990, and took place concurrently with a similarly rancorous 1992 U.S. Senate campaign between the Republican incumbent, Sen. Al D'Amato, and the Democratic challenger, state attorney general Robert Abrams.

In the campaign, Gaughran drew a surprising contrast between himself and Marino: he charged that Marino symbolized "clubhouse politics" and big government in Albany, and that Marino "voted for every state tax increase and every mandate on localities passed by the Legislature", while Gaughran himself signed a pledge to vote against any tax increase. Gaughran also chose environmental protection as a signature issue of his campaign, highlighting Marino's opposition to a state environmental trust fund and saying that Marino was "selling Long Island out on the environment".

Ultimately, Marino defeated Gaughran with a larger-than-expected margin of over 20 percentage points.

==== 2016 election ====
Gaughran ran against Marino's successor, Carl L. Marcellino, in 2016.

Marino had resigned from the state senate in February 1995 following his defeat in a senate caucus vote for another term as senate majority leader by Joseph Bruno, an ally of Marino's intraparty rival Gov. George Pataki. Marcellino had won the special election on March 14, 1995, to replace Marino, and had been reelected to ten full two-year terms, remaining in office since then.

Gaughran was unopposed in the Democratic primary. The general election was closer than expected, but Marcellino defeated Gaughran by 1,761 votes out of almost 160,000 votes, or about one percentage point.

==== 2018 election ====
Gaughran announced in February 2018 that he would seek a re-match with Marcellino, who was seeking his 12th full two-year term. Gaughran was again unopposed in the Democratic primary.

An analysis conducted by Politico found that, before 2018, the last Democratic candidate to win a state senate election on Long Island in a midterm year was Carol Berman in 1982; Berman defeated Dean Skelos to win a third term before losing to Skelos in a rematch in 1984.

Gaughran was endorsed by The New York Times, Newsday, and numerous local labor unions and activist groups. Campaign spending on behalf of both Gaughran and Marcellino was unusually prolific, reaching at least $2.8 million. Outside spending on behalf of Gaughran included $494,000 from the New York State United Teachers, $136,000 from the Communications Workers of America, and $15,000 from the New York State Nurses Association. An advisory from the political blog Daily Kos to left-leaning small donors included Gaughran among eight state legislature candidates in key races across the country; according to Gaughran's campaign, this "shout-out" attracted more than $47,000 in individual contributions from about 4,000 donors.

Gaughran won the 2018 election, defeating Marcellino by almost 10,000 votes out of about 118,000 votes, or about 8.5 percentage points. Gaughran's victory formed part of the successful campaign by the Democratic Party to retake the majority in the New York State Senate for the first time in a decade, and just the fourth time in 80 years.

==== 2020 election ====
Gaughran ran for a second term in 2020. The Republican nominee was Huntington town board member Edmund Smyth.

A bail reform law passed in 2019 became a major campaign issue for Gaughran and other Long Island Democrats facing a difficult reelection. Smyth was endorsed by 23 police unions angered by the bail reform law, as well as by police reforms enacted in response to the police murder of George Floyd in May 2020; the reforms included the repeal of a state statute that had allowed departments to conceal records of police misconduct. The police unions, alongside separate independent expenditure groups including Safe Together New York (which received $1.7 million from businessman Ronald Lauder) and the Long Island Law Enforcement Foundation, spent millions of dollars in advertisements targeting Democratic state senators including Gaughran.

By October, attack ads against Gaughran claimed that he "voted to release violent criminals" and that "New York's crime wave is no accident — state senator Jim Gaughran voted for it". Even as some observers noted that the claim that the bail reform law caused the increase in crime in 2020 contradicted official crime data, an internal Democratic poll showed that the ads were successful in damaging Gaughran's standing among voters. Gaughran responded with ads featuring him speaking directly to the camera: "If the attacks they are throwing at me seem crazy, well, that's because they are". According to Gaughran, the massive spending against him ultimately backfired: "To be honest with you, it was very effective in generating volunteers [for Gaughran]".

After endorsing Gaughran in both his 2016 and 2018 campaigns, Newsday endorsed Smyth in 2020. Assessing Gaughran's performance in his first term, the editorial board praised his successful efforts on the property tax cap and the bail reform law, but criticized his proposed bill to resolve local tax negotiations with the Long Island Power Authority (LIPA), calling it "unworkable".

Voting in the 2020 election was impacted by the COVID-19 pandemic; many more voters cast postal votes in 2020 than in previous elections, which delayed the reporting of results. In New York, in-person votes were tabulated before postal votes, so a phenomenon known as a "red mirage" occurred. On November 4, the results showed Gaughran trailing Smyth, 55,132 votes to 69,015, a margin of over 11 percentage points. Election analysts estimated that Gaughran would have to win about 70% of the absentee ballots in order to make up the difference, but acknowledged that this was possible because the Democratic Party had encouraged postal voting while the Republican Party generally discouraged it. Indeed, on November 18, Gaughran overtook Smyth in the vote count, and Smyth conceded the election.

The final results showed Gaughran defeating Smyth by 3,135 votes out of about 167,000, or about 2 percentage points. Gaughran's victory in a competitive district helped the Democratic Party win a two-thirds supermajority in the state senate in 2020.

=== Committee assignments ===
- Committee on Alcoholism and Substance Abuse (2019–2020)
- Committee on Commerce, Economic Development, and Small Business (2019–2020)
- Committee on Corporations, Authorities, and Commissions (2021–2022)
- 'Committee on Energy and Telecommunications (2021–2022)
- Committee on Higher Education (2019–2022)
- Committee on Investigations and Government Operations (2021–2022)
- Committee on Local Government (Chair, 2019–2022)
- Committee on Racing, Gaming, and Wagering (2019–2022)
- Committee on Women's Issues (2019–2020)

=== Tenure ===
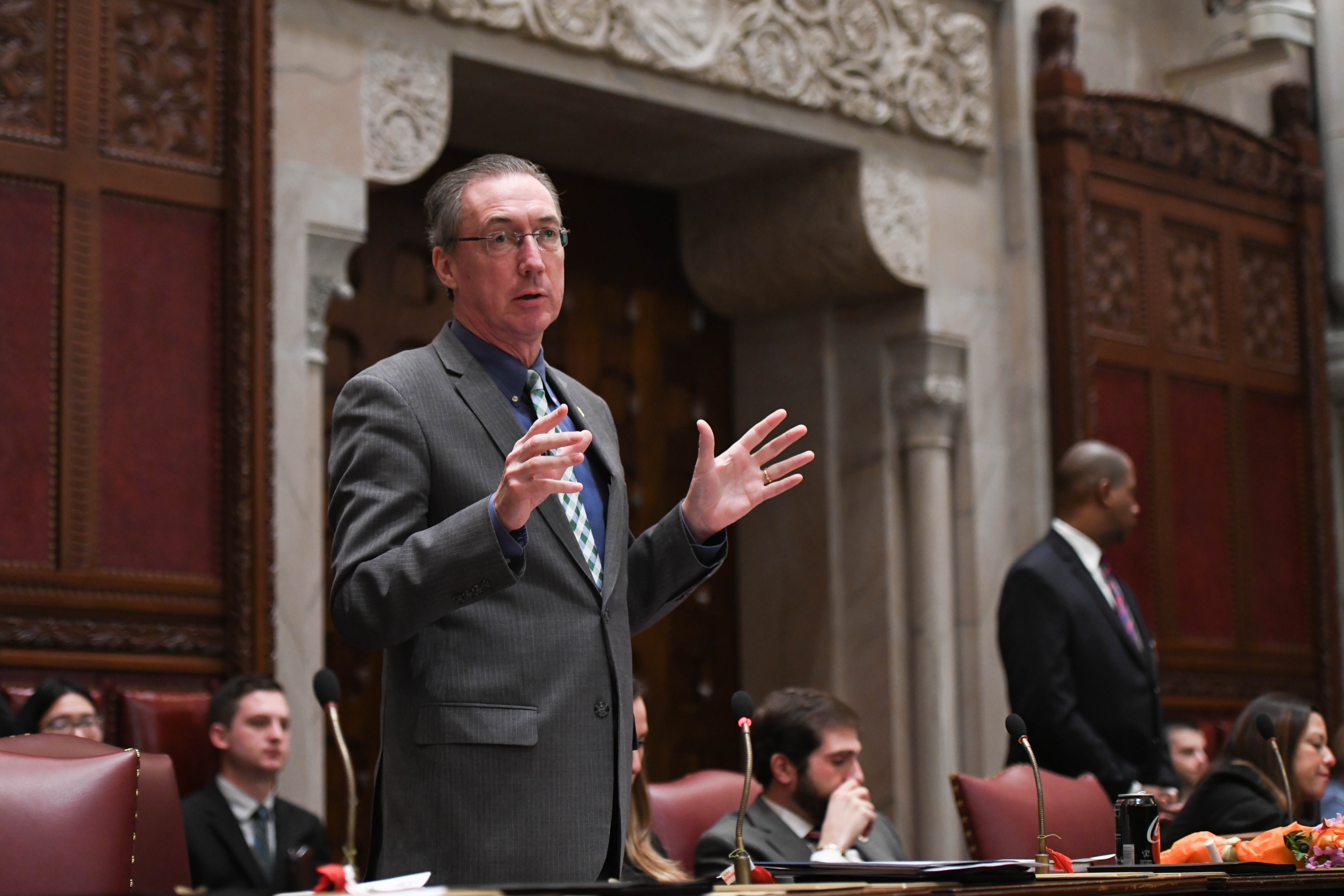
Gaughran speaking in the Senate at the NY State Capitol in 2019

Gaughran took office on January 1, 2019. On January 6, 2019, Gaughran held an in-district inauguration ceremony.

On January 17, 2019, Gaughran introduced a bill to make permanent the property tax cap of 2% enacted in 2011. Gaughran said the following about his rationale for introducing the bill:

Today I took the first step and introduced vital legislation to make the property tax cap permanent. No more temporary extensions....
We're beginning to feel the devastating effects of the federal limit on state and local tax deductions.... It is critical that New York State takes steps to providing real tax relief to Long Islanders, while the federal government continues its attack on New York taxpayers. The Democratic senate majority is going to provide local municipalities and school districts with mandate reform and increase state aid to our region to help lower local tax levies....

Gaughran's bill was passed by the senate almost unanimously on January 23, 2019; Gustavo Rivera and Julia Salazar, both Democrats, were the only two votes against Gaughran's bill.

In March 2021, Gaughran joined the other four Democratic state senators from Long Island in calling for |Gov. Andrew Cuomo to resign amid numerous allegations of sexual harassment. After an investigation by state attorney general Letitia James, Cuomo resigned in August 2021 facing a likely impeachment and removal by the state legislature.

In May 2021, Gaughran introduced a bill to establish a public water authority in Nassau County to replace New York American Water, the private supplier which charges residents the highest prices in the region. The bill was passed by the legislature in June 2021, and was signed by Gov. Kathy Hochul on November 3, 2021.

== Political positions ==
In his 2018 endorsement by Newsday, which is the largest newspaper on Long Island by circulation and the largest suburban newspaper in the United States, Gaughran is described as a "moderate and suburbanite ... who would protect Long Island against a New York City-centric agenda".

=== Corruption ===
Gaughran supports "simple remedies" which would reduce corruption in Albany, such as:

- prohibiting outside income for legislators,
- closing a loophole that allows large political donors to hide their identities and to legally exceed campaign finance limits via shell corporations,
- requiring legislators to reveal conflicts of interest,
- banning the personal use of campaign funds,
- allowing for the recall of elected officials via public petition.

=== Environmental policy ===
Gaughran touts his experience with environmental policy as the chair of the Suffolk County Water Authority. He supports a ban on offshore drilling, and a reduction in fossil fuel usage by 40% by the year 2030. He also favors measures targeting food waste, for its effects both on food-insecure households and on the environment.

=== Gun policy ===
Gaughran believes that the New York Secure Ammunition and Firearms Enforcement Act of 2013 should be expanded; he favors banning bump stocks and extending the background check waiting period from three to ten days.

=== Healthcare ===
In 2018, Gaughran expressed his intention to vote for the New York Health Act, which will establish a single-payer universal healthcare program in New York. However, after he was elected, he reneged on his promise to support the bill. In 2019, the New York Health Act was cosponsored by 31 senators, which was one short of a majority, and Gaughran and James Skoufis were identified as two senators who had previously expressed support for the bill but declined to cosponsor it. In 2020, Gaughran's campaign website did not mention the New York Health Act.

=== LGBT and reproductive rights ===
Gaughran supports classifying gender identity and expression as "protected classes", meaning that existing state laws prohibiting discrimination would then apply (viz. forbid discrimination on the basis of gender identity and expression). Gaughran also supports a state-wide ban on conversion therapy.

In January 2019, each of the 39 members of the Democratic caucus in the state senate, including Gaughran, cosponsored the Gender Expression Non-Discrimination Act (GENDA), alongside a conversion therapy ban. The bills were passed by the state legislature on January 15, 2019, and were signed by Gov. Andrew Cuomo on January 25, 2019.

Gaughran is pro-choice and supports codifying a woman's right to an abortion into state law, citing the conservative majority on the U.S. Supreme Court as a threat to reproductive rights established in the landmark Roe v. Wade case in 1973. In response to his vote in favor of the Reproductive Health Act in 2019, which expanded late term abortion and codified abortion rights statewide, the Huntington chapter of Ancient Order of Hibernians asked Gaughran to resign as a member and barred him from participating in the Saint Patrick's Day parade.

=== Schools ===
Gaughran favors overhauling the Common Core State Standards Initiative, which New York has formally adopted, saying "this time we need to listen to our teachers, our parents, and our children about what works". He opposes funding private for-profit charter schools with the public education budget. He cosponsored a bill to repeal the 2015 law establishing "Annual Professional Performance Reviews" (APPRs), which measured the effectiveness of teachers via the performance of their students on standardized tests; the bill was passed by the legislature on January 23, 2019, and was signed by Gov. Andrew Cuomo on April 12, 2019.

Gaughran advocates for legalizing, regulating, and taxing sports betting, and using the tax revenue to help fund school districts in order to alleviate the trend of rising property taxes.

=== Tax policy ===
Gaughran opposes the Tax Cuts and Jobs Act passed by the U.S. Congress and signed by President Donald Trump in late 2017, due to its cap on the state and local tax deduction, known as the SALT deduction. This cap raises the effective tax rate on many Long Island residents (300,000 households by Gaughran's estimation) since state and local taxes are higher on Long Island than they are on average nationwide.

=== Voting reform ===
Gaughran supports expanding early voting and facilitating voter registration. He opposes requiring a reason to request an absentee ballot. He supports appointing an independent re-districting commission to prevent gerrymandering,

== Personal life ==
In 1987, Gaughran married his wife, Carol, who works as a library media specialist. They reside in Northport, New York, and have two children, Kaitlin and Michael.

== Electoral history ==
Jim Gaughran electoral history

New York State Senate, 5th district, 1992
Party	Candidate	Votes	%
Republican	Ralph J. Marino (incumbent)	75,876	60.23%
Democratic	Jim Gaughran	50,104	39.77%
Total votes		125,980	100.00%
Republican hold			

Suffolk County Comptroller, 2014
Party	Candidate	Votes	%
Republican	John M. Kennedy, Jr.	158,165	52.94%
Total	John M. Kennedy, Jr.	158,165	52.94%
Democratic	Jim Gaughran	119,684	40.06%
Independence	Jim Gaughran	11,047	3.70%
Working Families	Jim Gaughran	9,868	3.30%
Total	Jim Gaughran	140,599	47.06%
Total votes		298,764	100.00%
Republican hold			

New York State Senate, 5th district, 2016
Party	Candidate	Votes	%
Republican	Carl L. Marcellino	64,256	40.26%
Conservative	Carl L. Marcellino	7,736	4.85%
Independence	Carl L. Marcellino	1,666	1.04%
Reform	Carl L. Marcellino	368	0.23%
Total	Carl Marcellino (incumbent)	74,026	46.39%
Democratic	Jim Gaughran	68,888	43.17%
Working Families	Jim Gaughran	2,394	1.50%
Women's Equality	Jim Gaughran	983	0.62%
Total	Jim Gaughran	72,265	45.28%
Total	Blank votes	13,132	8.23%
Total	Write-in votes	101	0.06%
Total	Void votes	65	0.04%
Total votes		159,589	100.00%
Republican hold			

New York State Senate, 5th district, 2018
Party	Candidate	Votes	%
Democratic	Jim Gaughran	65,673	51.93%
Working Families	Jim Gaughran	1,465	1.16%
Women's Equality	Jim Gaughran	889	0.70%
Total	Jim Gaughran	68,027	53.79%
Republican	Carl L. Marcellino	49,411	39.07%
Conservative	Carl L. Marcellino	5,223	4.13%
Independence	Carl L. Marcellino	952	0.75%
Reform	Carl L. Marcellino	239	0.19%
Total	Carl L. Marcellino (incumbent)	55,825	44.15%
Total	Blank votes	2,538	2.01%
Total	Void votes	38	0.03%
Total	Write-in votes	29	0.02%
Total votes		126,457	100.00%
Democratic gain from Republican			

New York State Senate, 5th district, 2020
Party	Candidate	Votes	%
Democratic	Jim Gaughran	84,137	46.66%
SAM	Jim Gaughran	343	0.19%
Total	Jim Gaughran (incumbent)	84,480	46.85%
Republican	Edmund Smyth	71,832	39.84%
Conservative	Edmund Smyth	7,364	4.08%
Independence	Edmund Smyth	1,325	0.73%
Libertarian	Edmund Smyth	741	0.41%
Total	Edmund Smyth	81,263	45.07%
Green	Barbara Wagner	1,831	1.02%
Total	Blank votes	12,600	6.99%
Total	Void votes	98	0.05%
Total	Write-in votes	37	0.02%
Total votes		180,309	100.00%
Democratic hold			

== See also ==
- List of New York state senators
- 2018 New York State Senate election
- 2020 New York State Senate election

New York State Senate
Preceded by Carl Marcellino	Member of the New York State Senate from the 5th district 2019–2022	Succeeded by Steven Rhoads
