= New York's 11th State Assembly district =

American legislative district

Assemblymember
Kwani O'Pharrow; D–West Babylon

New York's 11th State Assembly district is one of the 150 districts in the New York State Assembly. It has been represented by Democrat Kwani O'Pharrow since 2025, succeeding Kimberly Jean-Pierre.

== Geography ==
=== 2020s ===
District 11 contains portions of Suffolk and Nassau counties. It includes portions of the town of Babylon, including Lindenhurst, Amityville, Wheatley Heights and parts of Wyandanch. It also includes a portion of East Massapequa.

The 11th district is entirely within New York's 2nd congressional district, and overlaps the 4th and 8th districts of the New York State Senate.

=== 2010s ===
District 11 is in Suffolk County. It includes portions of the town of Babylon, including Lindenhurst, Amityville, Wheatley Heights and parts of Wyandanch.

== Recent election results ==
=== 2026 ===
2026 New York State Assembly election, District 11
Party	Candidate	Votes	%
Democratic	Kwani O'Pharrow (incumbent)		
Republican	Joseph Cardinale		
Conservative	Joseph Cardinale		
Total	Joseph Cardinale		
Write-in			
Total votes			

=== 2024 ===
2024 New York State Assembly election, District 11
Party	Candidate	Votes	%
Democratic	Kwani O'Pharrow	26,878	50.8
Republican	Joseph Cardinale	23,274	
Conservative	Joseph Cardinale	2,707	
Total	Joseph Cardinale	25,981	49.1
Write-in		27	0.1
Total votes		52,886	100.0
Democratic hold			

=== 2022 ===
2022 New York State Assembly election, District 11
Party	Candidate	Votes	%
Democratic	Kimberly Jean-Pierre (incumbent)	18,362	50.4
Republican	Christopher Sperber	16,114	
Conservative	Christopher Sperber	1,963	
Total	Christopher Sperber	18,077	49.6
Write-in		14	0.0
Total votes		36,445	100.0
Democratic hold			

=== 2020 ===
2020 New York State Assembly election, District 11
Party	Candidate	Votes	%
Democratic	Kimberly Jean-Pierre	29,515	
Independence	Kimberly Jean-Pierre	877	
Total	Kimberly Jean-Pierre (incumbent)	30,392	59.6
Republican	Eugene Murray	18,402	
Conservative	Eugene Murray	2,171	
Total	Eugene Murray	20,573	40.4
Write-in		16	0.0
Total votes		50,981	100.0
Democratic hold			

=== 2018 ===
2018 New York State Assembly election, District 11
Party	Candidate	Votes	%
Democratic	Kimberly Jean-Pierre	22,274	
Working Families	Kimberly Jean-Pierre	528	
Independence	Kimberly Jean-Pierre	455	
Women's Equality	Kimberly Jean-Pierre	228	
Total	Kimberly Jean-Pierre (incumbent)	23,485	64.4
Republican	Kevin Sabella	11,631	
Conservative	Kevin Sabella	1,375	
Total	Kevin Sabella	13,006	35.6
Write-in		3	0.0
Total votes		36,494	100.0
Democratic hold			

=== 2016 ===
2016 New York State Assembly election, District 11
Primary election
Party	Candidate	Votes	%
Democratic	Kimberly Jean-Pierre (incumbent)	1,411	78.2
Democratic	Jordan Wilson Jr.	394	21.8
Write-in		0	0.0
Total votes		1,805	100
Republican	Shawn Culinane	624	96.0
Republican	Kimberly Jean-Pierre (incumbent)	26	4.0
Write-in		0	0.0
Total votes		650	100
Reform	Kimberly Jean-Pierre (incumbent)	6	100
Write-in		0	0.0
Total votes		6	100
General election
Democratic	Kimberly Jean-Pierre	24,411	
Working Families	Kimberly Jean-Pierre	934	
Independence	Kimberly Jean-Pierre	690	
Reform	Kimberly Jean-Pierre	94	
Total	Kimberly Jean-Pierre (incumbent)	26,129	60.1
Republican	Shawn Culinane	17,369	39.9
Write-in		13	0.0
Total votes		43,511	100.0
Democratic hold			

=== 2014 ===
2014 New York State Assembly election, District 11
Party	Candidate	Votes	%
Democratic	Kimberly Jean-Pierre	10,328	
Working Families	Kimberly Jean-Pierre	696	
Independence	Kimberly Jean-Pierre	572	
Total	Kimberly Jean-Pierre	11,596	57.9
Republican	Mark Gallo	6,670	33.3
Conservative	James Butler	1,738	8.8
Write-in		8	0.0
Total votes		20,012	100.0
Democratic hold			

=== 2012 ===
2012 New York State Assembly election, District 11
Party	Candidate	Votes	%
Democratic	Robert Sweeney	25,189	
Working Families	Robert Sweeney	1,171	
Independence	Robert Sweeney	1,104	
Total	Robert Sweeney (incumbent)	28,064	79.3
Republican	Rashad Cureton	7,326	20.7
Write-in		4	0.0
Total votes		35,394	100.0
Democratic hold			

=== 2010 ===
2010 New York State Assembly election, District 11
Party	Candidate	Votes	%
Democratic	Robert Sweeney	14,533	
Independence	Robert Sweeney	1,486	
Working Families	Robert Sweeney	779	
Total	Robert Sweeney (incumbent)	16,798	67.3
Republican	Brett Robinson	6,643	
Conservative	Brett Robinson	1,500	
Total	Brett Robinson	8,143	32.7
Write-in		1	0.0
Total votes		24,942	100.0
Democratic hold			
