= Teepa Snow =

American dementia care specialist

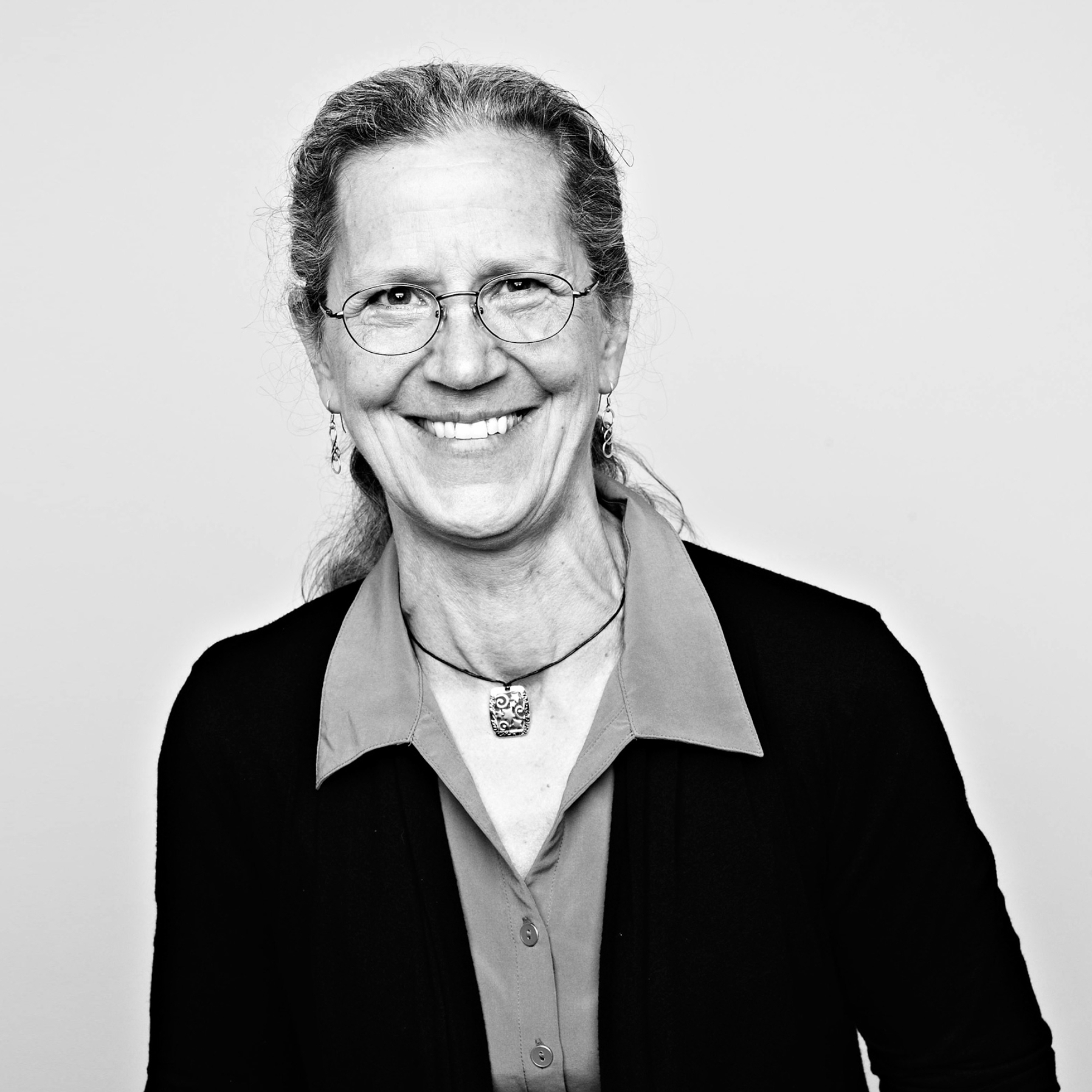
- Occupations: Dementia care specialist, Occupational Therapist
- Website: https://teepasnow.com/

Teepa Snow is an American dementia care specialist and occupational therapist. She is a fellow of the American Occupational Therapy Association.

== Career ==
Snow graduated in Zoology from Duke University and completed her Master of Science degree from the University of North Carolina in Chapel Hill. Soon after, she worked as a part of Duke University Medical Center's Neuro-Rehabilitation Team. Snow has held a clinical appointment with Duke University and UNC-Chapel Hill's School of Medicine for over 20 years.

She also worked at UNC-CH's Geriatric Clinic, as an OT director in a head injury facility, as a clinical specialist in geriatrics for a Veteran's Administration Medical Center, and as a therapist and restorative care coordinator for long term care facilities.

Snow is the Education Director of Eastern North Carolina's Alzheimer's Association, where she created a DVD, entitled Accepting the Challenge: Providing the Best Care for People with Dementia. She has also served as the Program Director of Durham Technical Community College's OTA program. She is also a part of the Alzheimer's Foundation of America.

In 2007, Snow founded Positive Approach to Care (PAC), a dementia care company. It is collaborating to improve dementia care in over thirty countries. She first developed PAC technique early in her practice career and introduced it to others in continuing education workshops for nursing in the late 1980s. By the mid-1990s, she was providing training about working with people with neurological impairments and brain failure across the South through the regional continuing education network known as AHEC. She collaborated with her fellow clinicians at UNC-CH to produce her first book, entitled Geriatric First Aid Kit. It was designed as a quick reference guide to help interns, residents, nurses, and other healthcare providers with a tool to provide better care for elders.

Snow has delivered over 8,000 in-person training sessions across the US, Canada, Australia, Poland, and the U.K. She has also delivered over 500 dementia care webinars, authored over 35 dementia care DVDs and has published several books around dementia care and caregiver self-care. She also gained recognition on the social media platform, TikTok. Snow helped retired actor Bruce Willis with his dementia.

== Publications ==
- Creative Solutions to Challenging Situations Workbook (2016)
- Dementia Caregiver Guide (2018)
- Seeing the GEMS® Workbook (2020)
- Relationships: Guidebook for Teepa Snow's Positive Approach to All Relationships
- Understanding the Changing Brain: A Positive Approach to Dementia Care (2022)
- When is Enough, Enough? A Positive Approach to Finding Balance in a Caring Life (2022)
- A Heart Full of GEMS (2015)
- Grandma's Living With Dementia (2023)
- Bad Words and Dementia (2023)
