= Andrew Garbarino =

American politician (born 1984)

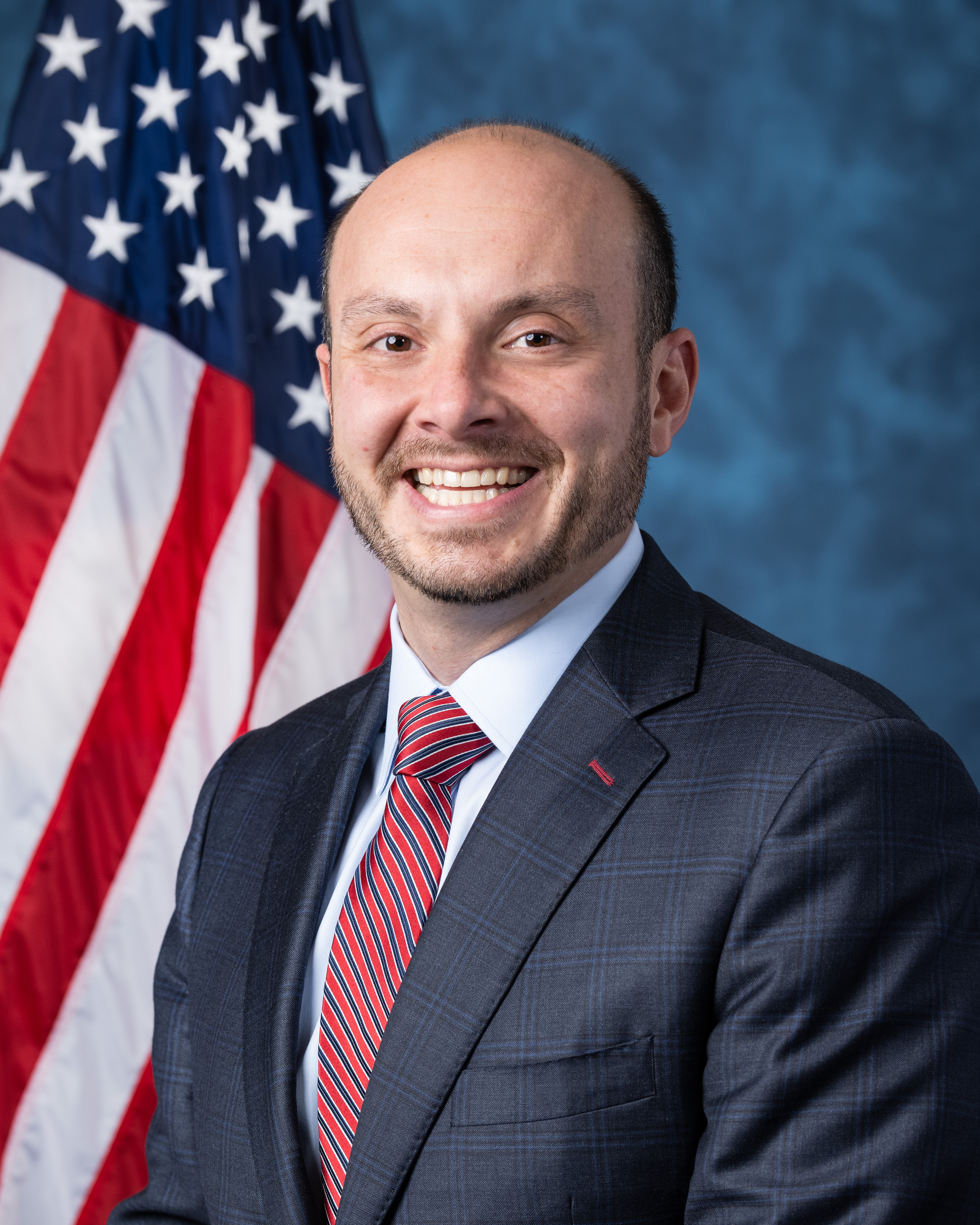
- Official portrait, 2021

Chair of the House Homeland Security Committee
- Incumbent
- Assumed office July 22, 2025
- Preceded by: Mark Green

Member of the U.S. House of Representatives from New York's 2nd district
- Incumbent
- Assumed office January 3, 2021
- Preceded by: Peter King

Member of the New York State Assembly from the 7th district
- In office January 1, 2013 – December 31, 2020
- Preceded by: Michael Fitzpatrick
- Succeeded by: Jarett Gandolfo

Personal details
- Born: Andrew Reed Garbarino; September 27, 1984 (age 42) Sayville, New York, U.S.
- Party: Republican
- Education: George Washington University (BA); Hofstra University (JD)
- Website: House website Campaign website
- Garbarino's voice Garbarino questioning witnesses on China's acceptance of loans from the Asian Development Bank. Recorded February 7, 2023

Andrew Reed Garbarino (/ˌɡɑːrbərˈiːnoʊ/ GAR-bə-REE-noh; born September 27, 1984) is an American attorney and politician serving as the U.S. representative for New York's 2nd congressional district since 2021. A member of the Republican Party, he served as the New York State Assemblyman for the 7th district from 2013 to 2020.

A moderate Republican, Garbarino is a member of the moderate Republican Governance Group and is known for frequently breaking with his party on high-profile issues. In 2021, he voted with Democrats to help pass the Bipartisan Background Checks Act, the Infrastructure Investment and Jobs Act, and supported the creation of a commission to investigate the January 6 Capitol attack. In 2022, he voted in favor of the Respect for Marriage Act. In 2023, he was one of 18 Republicans who voted against Jim Jordan's nomination for speaker of the House all three times.

In July 2025, he became the Chair of the House Homeland Security Committee following the resignation of Mark Green. Within this role, Garbarino stated his main priorities would include strengthening cybersecurity, counterrorism, and improving preparedness for natural disasters.

== Early life and education ==
Garbarino was born and raised in Sayville, New York. He graduated from Sayville High School and earned a Bachelor of Arts degree in history and classical humanities from George Washington University. He then earned a Juris Doctor from Hofstra University School of Law.

== Career ==
After graduating from law school, Garbarino worked at his family law firm in Sayville. His family also owns numerous small businesses in communities from Bay Shore to Patchogue.

=== New York State Assembly ===
In 2012, Phil Boyle vacated his New York Assembly seat to run for the New York Senate. The New York Republican Party nominated Garbarino to replace him, and he was elected with 56% of the vote. He was reelected three times, in 2014, 2016, and 2018. Garbarino was a member of the New York Conference of Italian-American State Legislators as an assemblyman.

== U.S. House of Representatives ==
=== Elections ===
==== 2020 ====
2020 GOP primary results by county: Garbarino: 50–60%; 60–70%

Following the announcement that 14-term incumbent Representative Peter T. King would not run for reelection in 2020, Garbarino announced his candidacy for Congress in New York's 2nd congressional district. He ran in the June 23 Republican Party primary, and was endorsed by King, as well as the Nassau County and Suffolk County Republican Parties. He defeated Assemblyman Mike LiPetri, 65% to 35%.

In the general election, Garbarino was the candidate of the Republican, Conservative, and Libertarian parties, and the Serve America Movement. He defeated Suffolk County legislator Jackie Gordon, the nominee of the Democratic, Working Families, and Independence parties, 53% to 46%.

==== 2022 ====
2022 GOP primary results by county: Garbarino: 50–60%; Cornicelli: 50–60%

Garbarino won the Republican primary with 52.6% of the vote against primary challengers Robert Cornicelli and Mike Rakebrandt.

In a rematch against 2020 Democratic nominee Jackie Gordon, Garbarino again defeated Gordon, 60.7% to 39.3%.

==== 2024 ====
Garbarino won the Republican primary unopposed, and was re-elected with 59.8% of the vote against Democratic nominee Rob Lubin, who won 40.2% of the vote.

=== Tenure ===
Garbarino was sworn in on January 3, 2021. He is regarded as a moderate Republican, and he has often broken with his party on high-profile issues.

On January 6, 2021, Garbarino did not object to the Electoral College results, saying:

The role of Congress is not to overturn the election or to take actions that silence voters. The Constitution is clear, the votes must be counted and certified by the states and Congress has the constitutional obligation to accept those electors and certify each states’ elections. All 50 states have certified their elections and the majority of electors have cast their votes for President-Elect Joe Biden. While I join many Long Islanders in wishing the results were different, Congress does not have the constitutional authority to overturn the election.

Garbarino voted against the American Rescue Plan Act of 2021, as did every congressional Republican.

On May 19, 2021, Garbarino was one of 35 Republicans who joined all Democrats in voting to approve legislation to establish the January 6, 2021 commission meant to investigate the storming of the U.S. Capitol.

On November 5, 2021, Garbarino was one of 13 Republicans who voted with a majority of Democrats in favor of the Infrastructure Investment and Jobs Act. Trump excoriated House Republicans who voted for the bill.

In October 2023, Garbarino was one of 18 Republicans who voted against the nomination of Jim Jordan for Speaker of the House all three times.

During passage of President Trump's budget called the "One Big Beautiful Bill Act" on May 22, 2025, Garbarino "fell asleep" and missed the vote.

==== Agriculture ====
In October 2023, Garbarino led a letter to the House Agriculture Committee by 16 House Republicans opposing the inclusion of the Ending Agricultural Trade Suppression (EATS) Act in the 2023 farm bill, which would have overturned California's Proposition 12 and other state and local animal welfare laws restricting the sale of agricultural goods from animals raised in battery cages, gestation crates, and veal crates. Garbarino led an additional letter in 2025 by 14 House Republicans opposing an updated version of the law, the Save Our Bacon Act. He has received an award from the agricultural advocacy groups Organization for Competitive Markets and Competitive Markets Action for opposing federal preemption of state and local agricultural laws.

In September 2024, Garbarino led a letter by 11 House Republicans to Director of National Intelligence Avril Haines requesting an analysis of Chinese biotechnology and cultivated meat developments and soliciting recommendations for the United States to outcompete China in alternative proteins research and development.

==== Gun control ====
In March 2021, Garbarino was one of 8 Republicans to vote for the Bipartisan Background Checks Act of 2021.

==== Immigration ====
In 2021, Garbarino was one of 30 Republicans who voted for the Farm Workforce Modernization Act, which would grant legal status to illegal immigrants working in agriculture and establish a pathway to permanent residency contingent on continued farm work.

==== Surveillance ====
In January 2026, Garbarino was one of 57 Republicans who voted against blocking funding for federally driven “kill switch” vehicle technology, allowing regulators to move forward with systems that could monitor drivers and intervene in vehicle operation.

==== LGBT rights ====
In 2021, Garbarino co-sponsored the Fairness for All Act, a Republican alternative to the Equality Act. The bill would prohibit discrimination on the basis of sex, sexual orientation, and gender identity, and protect the free exercise of religion.

On July 19, 2022, Garbarino was one of 46 Republicans who voted for the Respect for Marriage Act, codifying the right to same-sex marriage in federal law.

=== Committee assignments ===
For the 119th Congress:

- Committee on Ethics
- Committee on Financial Services
  - Subcommittee on Capital Markets (Vice Chairman)
  - Subcommittee on Housing and Insurance
  - Subcommittee on Oversight and Investigations
- Committee on Homeland Security (Chair)

=== Caucus memberships ===
- Climate Solutions Caucus
- Problem Solvers Caucus
- Republican Main Street Partnership
- Republican Governance Group

== Personal life ==
Garbarino is Catholic. He resides in Bayport.

== Electoral history ==
=== 2026 ===
2026 United States House of Representatives election in New York, District 2
Party	Candidate	Votes	%
Republican	Andrew Garbarino		
Conservative	Andrew Garbarino		
Total	Andrew Garbarino (incumbent)		
Democratic	Patrick G. Halpin		
Working Families	Patrick G. Halpin		
Total	Patrick G. Halpin		
Write-in			
Total votes			

=== 2024 ===
2024 United States House of Representatives election in New York, District 2
Party	Candidate	Votes	%
Republican	Andrew Garbarino	180,374	53.2
Conservative	Andrew Garbarino	22,223	6.6
Total	Andrew Garbarino (incumbent)	202,597	59.7
Democratic	Rob Lubin	129,937	38.3
Working Families	Rob Lubin	6,434	1.9
Total	Rob Lubin	136,371	40.2
Write-in		189	0.1
Total votes		339,157	100.0
Republican hold			

=== 2022 ===
2022 United States House of Representatives Republican primary in New York, District 2
Party	Candidate	Votes	%
Republican	Andrew Garbarino (incumbent)	9,902	52.6
Republican	Robert Cornicelli	7,250	38.5
Republican	Mike Rakebrandt	1,622	8.6
Write-in		70	0.4
Total votes		18,844	100.0

2022 United States House of Representatives election in New York, District 2
Party	Candidate	Votes	%
Republican	Andrew Garbarino	130,798	52.5
Conservative	Andrew Garbarino	20,380	8.2
Total	Andrew Garbarino (incumbent)	151,178	60.7
Democratic	Jackie Gordon	93,299	37.5
Working Families	Jackie Gordon	4,475	1.8
Total	Jackie Gordon	97,774	39.3
Write-in		80	0.0
Total votes		249,032	100.0
Republican hold			

=== 2020 ===
2020 United States House of Representatives Republican primary in New York, District 2
Party	Candidate	Votes	%
Republican	Andrew Garbarino	17,462	63.2
Republican	Mike LiPetri	9,867	35.7
Write-in		288	1.0
Total votes		27,617	100.0

2020 United States House of Representatives election in New York, District 2
Party	Candidate	Votes	%
Republican	Andrew Garbarino	158,151	47.2
Conservative	Andrew Garbarino	17,434	5.2
Libertarian	Andrew Garbarino	1,491	0.4
SAM	Andrew Garbarino	303	0.1
Total	Andrew Garbarino	177,379	52.9
Democratic	Jackie Gordon	144,849	43.2
Working Families	Jackie Gordon	6,380	1.9
Independence	Jackie Gordon	3,017	0.9
Total	Jackie Gordon	154,246	46.0
Green	Harry R. Burger	3,448	1.0
Write-in		90	0.0
Total votes		335,163	100.0
Republican hold			

=== 2018 ===
2018 New York State Assembly Women's Equality primary, District 7
Party	Candidate	Votes	%
Women's Equality	Andrew Garbarino (incumbent)	2	100.0
Women's Equality	Thomas E. Murray III	0	0.0
Total votes		2	100.0

2018 New York State Assembly election, District 7
Party	Candidate	Votes	%
Republican	Andrew Garbarino	24,552	49.6
Conservative	Andrew Garbarino	3,257	6.6
Independence	Andrew Garbarino	813	1.6
Women's Equality	Andrew Garbarino	348	0.7
Reform	Andrew Garbarino	105	0.2
Total	Andrew Garbarino (incumbent)	29,075	58.7
Democratic	Thomas E. Murray III	20,452	41.3
Write-in		13	0.0
Total votes		49,540	100.0
Republican hold			

=== 2016 ===
2016 New York State Assembly election, District 7
Party	Candidate	Votes	%
Republican	Andrew Garbarino	31,330	55.0
Conservative	Andrew Garbarino	5,018	8.8
Independence	Andrew Garbarino	1,612	2.8
Reform	Andrew Garbarino	275	0.5
Total	Andrew Garbarino (incumbent)	38,235	67.2
Democratic	Nickolas R. Gambini	18,653	32.8
Write-in		26	0.0
Total votes		56,914	100.0
Republican hold			

=== 2014 ===
2014 New York State Assembly election, District 7
Party	Candidate	Votes	%
Republican	Andrew Garbarino	15,839	52.8
Conservative	Andrew Garbarino	3,647	12.2
Independence	Andrew Garbarino	1,351	4.5
Total	Andrew Garbarino (incumbent)	20,837	69.4
Democratic	Deborah Pfeiffer	9,162	30.5
Write-in		8	0.0
Total votes		30,007	100.0
Republican hold			

=== 2012 ===
2012 New York State Assembly election, District 7
Party	Candidate	Votes	%
Republican	Andrew Garbarino	22,174	44.2
Conservative	Andrew Garbarino	4,672	9.3
Independence	Andrew Garbarino	1,414	2.8
Main Street	Andrew Garbarino	241	0.5
Total	Andrew Garbarino	28,501	56.8
Democratic	Christopher D. Bodkin	21,701	43.2
Write-in		9	0.0
Total votes		50,211	100.0
Republican hold			

U.S. House of Representatives
Preceded by Peter King	Member of the U.S. House of Representatives from New York's 2nd congressional district 2021–present	Incumbent
Preceded by Mark Green	Chair of the House Homeland Security Committee; 2025–present	Incumbent
U.S. order of precedence (ceremonial)
Preceded by Scott Franklin	United States representatives by seniority 252nd	Succeeded by Carlos A. Giménez
