= Robert J. Gaffney =

American politician

6th County Executive of Suffolk County, New York
- In office January 1, 1992 – December 31, 2003
- Preceded by: Patrick G. Halpin
- Succeeded by: Steve Levy

Member of the New York State Assembly from the 4th district
- In office 1985–1991
- Preceded by: George J. Hochbrueckner
- Succeeded by: Steve Englebright

Personal details
- Born: February 26, 1944 (age 82) New York, New York, U.S.
- Party: Republican
- Education: Fordham University; Fordham University School of Law
- Occupation: President of Dowling College (2006-2010)

Robert J. Gaffney (born February 26, 1944) was the sixth County Executive of Suffolk County, New York. First elected in 1991, he served through 2003. He was president of Dowling College from 2006 to 2010.

Born and educated in New York City, he received a Bachelor of Science degree in Business from Fordham University School of Business in 1965 and a J.D. from Fordham University School of Law in 1969. After working as a Special Agent with the Federal Bureau of Investigation, Gaffney moved to Suffolk County in 1973. There he practiced law, concentrating in the areas of real property, litigation, corporate and commercial law.

Gaffney was a member of the New York State Assembly (4th D.) from 1985 to 1991, sitting in the 186th, 187th, 188th and 189th New York State Legislatures. He served as the ranking Republican member of the Real Property Tax Committee and the Committee on Corrections, as well as the Assembly Standing Committees on Codes, Higher Education, Environmental Conservation and the Judiciary. He also co-chaired the Assembly Republican Task Force on Crime Victims' Rights.

During his three terms as Suffolk County Executive, Gaffney was President of the New York State Association of Counties from 1994 to 1995 and President of the New York State County Executives Association from 1995 to 1996. He served on the New York Metropolitan Transportation Coordinating Committee from 1992 to 2003. As an adjunct professor at the State University of New York at Stony Brook, he taught Public Policy and Administration in the Graduate School of Political Science from 2000 to 2003. From 2004 until his appointment at Dowling in 2006, he was a partner at the Long Island law firm of Meyer, Suozzi, English & Klein, P.C.

In 2004, he was elected a Trustee of Dowling College. He became President of Dowling College on October 1, 2006. He has also served on the boards or committees of Central Suffolk Hospital and the Long Island Housing Partnership. In 2005, Gaffney was appointed by Governor George Pataki to the New York State Commission on Healthcare Facilities in the 21st Century.

New York State Assembly
Preceded by George J. Hochbrueckner	New York State Assembly; 4th District; 1985–1991	Succeeded by Steve Englebright
Political offices
Preceded by Patrick G. Halpin	County Executive of Suffolk County; 1992–2003	Succeeded by Steve Levy
