= Peter J. Schmitt =

American politician

County Legislator of Nassau County, New York's 12th District
- In office 1996–2012
- Preceded by: N/A
- Succeeded by: Michael Venditto

Commissioner of the Department of Community and Youth Services for the Town of Oyster Bay
- In office 1984–1995

Personal details
- Born: June 27, 1950
- Died: October 3, 2012 (aged 62) Mineola, New York, U.S.
- Party: Republican
- Spouse: Lois Schmitt
- Education: Hofstra University

Peter J. Schmitt (June 27, 1950 – October 3, 2012), R-Massapequa, was the leader of Nassau County, New York's Legislature. Schmitt represented the 12th legislative district in Nassau County, which includes Massapequa, Massapequa Park, most of North Massapequa, and part of Seaford. A graduate of Hofstra University, he had lived in the area since 1974.

He was elected to the Legislature in 1995 when it was first created and has represented the 12th district ever since Schmitt served as the Legislature's Deputy Presiding Officer from 1996 to 1999 when it was under Republican control. From 2000 to 2009, he served as Minority Leader, and he served as Presiding Officer from 2010 to his death in 2012, after Republicans regained control of the Legislature.

== Death ==
Schmitt died suddenly on October 3, 2012, aged 62, of a heart attack during a conference with County Executive Ed Mangano. He was 62 years old.
