= Suffolk County Water Authority =

Public benefit corporation in New York, United States

Public benefit corporation overview
- Formed: 1937 (formed); 1951 (activated)
- Jurisdiction: Suffolk County, New York
- Status: Active
- Headquarters: 4060 Sunrise Highway Oakdale, NY 11769
- Website: www.scwa.com

The Suffolk County Water Authority ("SCWA") is a public benefit corporation in Suffolk County, New York, United States. It is responsible for delivering and maintaining the majority of Suffolk County's public water supply and infrastructure, and is one of the largest suppliers of groundwater in the United States.

== Description ==
The Suffolk County Water Authority provides most of the drinking water in Suffolk County and owns, operates and maintains the majority of the county's water supply infrastructure – including distribution lines, wells, plants, storage facilities, and regional pipelines linking various parts of the county. It operates under the New York Public Authorities Law on a non-profit basis, without taxing powers.

As of 2022, the SCWA served approximately 1.2 million customers in Suffolk County, with over 1 billion gallons pumped from its wells in 2025, with the largest user being the Northport Power Station.

The Suffolk County Water Authority is headquartered at 4060 Sunrise Highway (NY 27), within the Suffolk County hamlet of Oakdale.

== History ==
Prior to the Suffolk County Water Authority's establishment, the majority of the county was served by smaller water districts, village water supply systems, private utility companies, or otherwise lacked large-scale public water supply infrastructure.

The Suffolk County Water Authority was first created on March 29, 1937, after the Suffolk County Board of Supervisors voted in favor of the proposal, aiming to conserve the county's groundwater supply and to prevent New York City – and, to an extent, Nassau County – to Suffolk's west from tapping into and diverting it for their own supply systems. Upon establishment, the SCWA was New York's first water authority established under Chapter 847 of the state's 1934 laws. It would not, however, become an active utility until 1951.

It was also in 1951, that the SCWA acquired all property and operations of the South Bay Consolidated Water Company, including its plants, wells, and other infrastructure, covering an area of approximately 300 square miles (780 km^{2}) in the county.

In 1954, Governor Thomas E. Dewey signed into law legislation enabling the Suffolk County Water Authority to purchase water districts after residents of a given district authorize the takeover by vote; the districts would then cease to operate, with the SCWA assuming those functions. The SCWA subsequently expanded, consolidating over 40 smaller water districts across Suffolk County in the years and decades that followed.

By the late 1980s, the Suffolk County Water Authority expanded its public water supply network to cover Wyandanch, West Babylon, and North Babylon in southwestern Suffolk County, in turn connecting thousands of Suffolk County houses in these areas to a public water supply system for the first time; these areas had primarily been dependent on private wells until then.

=== 21st century ===
In the early 2020s, the SCWA was in negotiations with communities in the northwestern portion of the Town of Oyster Bay in Nassau County, in helping them to create a public water utility after decades of private ownership and supply.

By 2022, the Suffolk County Water Authority served roughly 1.2 million customers across Suffolk County.

In the mid-2020s, it was announced that plans for a new, 12-mile (19 km) SCWA water transmission pipeline on the North Fork would move forward. The new main being constructed as part of this project – known as the North Fork Water Main Project – will enable more water to be provided to places on the North Fork, where supply has struggled to keep up with demand.

== Governance ==
The Suffolk County Water Authority is governed by a five-member board of directors. Each member of the Suffolk County Water Authority Board of Directors is appointed to the board by the Suffolk County Legislature.

As of October 2026, the Chairman of the Suffolk County Water Authority is Charles A. Lefkowitz.

=== Chairs ===
Chairs of the SCWA
Chair	Years
W. Kingsland Macy	1937–1952
Franklin S. Koons	1952–1959
T. Bayles Minuse	1959–1964
Richard D. Zeidler	1964–1970
vacant	1970–1972
Walter C. Hazlitt	1973–1977
Robert J. Flynn	1977–1987
Leon J. Campo	1987–1990
Michael A. LoGrande	October 23, 1990 – May 29, 2010
James F. Gaughran	May 30, 2010 – December 14, 2018
Patrick G. Halpin	December 18, 2018 – March 24, 2023
Charles A. Lefkowitz	May 2, 2023 – present

=== Board of directors ===
Members of the Board of Directors of the SCWA
	Seat 1	Seat 2	Seat 3	Seat 4	Seat 5
1937–1952	W. Kingsland Macy (1937 – 1952)	Frank J. Smith (1937 – 1952)	Carll S. Burr, Jr. (1937 – 1964)	vacant	vacant
1952–1957	Franklin S. Koons (1952 – 1959)	Harry Paul Fishel (1952 – November 15, 1962)	Carll S. Burr, Jr. (1937 – 1964)	T. Bayles Minuse (1952 – June 15, 1964)	Charles W. Frieman (1952 – 1961)
1958–1959	Franklin S. Koons (1952 – 1959)	Harry Paul Fishel (1952 – November 15, 1962)	Carll S. Burr, Jr. (1937 – 1964)	T. Bayles Minuse (1952 – June 15, 1964)	Charles W. Frieman (1952 – 1961)
1960	Hermon F. Bishop (1959 – August 1, 1960)	Harry Paul Fishel (1952 – November 15, 1962)	Carll S. Burr, Jr. (1937 – 1964)	T. Bayles Minuse (1952 – June 15, 1964)	Charles W. Frieman (1952 – 1961)
1961	Adrian F. Mason (August 22, 1960 – August 1964)	Harry Paul Fishel (1952 – November 15, 1962)	Carll S. Burr, Jr. (1937 – 1964)	T. Bayles Minuse (1952 – June 15, 1964)	Charles W. Frieman (1952 – 1961)
1962	Adrian F. Mason (August 22, 1960 – August 1964)	Harry Paul Fishel (1952 – November 15, 1962)	Carll S. Burr, Jr. (1937 – 1964)	T. Bayles Minuse (1952 – June 15, 1964)	Hermon L. Bishop (July 24, 1961 – March 30, 1976)
1963	Adrian F. Mason (August 22, 1960 – August 1964)	Edward McGowan (November 26, 1962 – June 10, 1968)	Carll S. Burr, Jr. (1937 – 1964)	T. Bayles Minuse (1952 – June 15, 1964)	Hermon L. Bishop (July 24, 1961 – March 30, 1976)
1964	Adrian F. Mason (August 22, 1960 – August 1964)	Edward McGowan (November 26, 1962 – June 10, 1968)	Richard E. Allen (1964 – 1966)	Richard D. Zeidler (June 15, 1964 – 1970)	Hermon L. Bishop (July 24, 1961 – March 30, 1976)
1965–1966	Matthew B. Kondenar (March 22, 1965 – January 29, 1997)	Edward McGowan (November 26, 1962 – June 10, 1968)	Richard E. Allen (1964 – 1966)	Richard D. Zeidler (June 15, 1964 – 1970)	Hermon L. Bishop (July 24, 1961 – March 30, 1976)
1967	Matthew B. Kondenar (March 22, 1965 – January 29, 1997)	Edward McGowan (November 26, 1962 – June 10, 1968)	J. Harvey McCoy (March 13, 1967 – March 29, 1974)	Richard D. Zeidler (June 15, 1964 – 1970)	Hermon L. Bishop (July 24, 1961 – March 30, 1976)
1968–1969	Matthew B. Kondenar (March 22, 1965 – January 29, 1997)	H. Ward Ackerson (June 10, 1968 – April 11, 1978)	J. Harvey McCoy (March 13, 1967 – March 29, 1974)	Richard D. Zeidler (June 15, 1964 – 1970)	Hermon L. Bishop (July 24, 1961 – March 30, 1976)
1970–1972	Matthew B. Kondenar (March 22, 1965 – January 29, 1997)	H. Ward Ackerson (June 10, 1968 – April 11, 1978)	J. Harvey McCoy (March 13, 1967 – March 29, 1974)	vacant	Hermon L. Bishop (July 24, 1961 – March 30, 1976)
1973	Matthew B. Kondenar (March 22, 1965 – January 29, 1997)	H. Ward Ackerson (June 10, 1968 – April 11, 1978)	J. Harvey McCoy (March 13, 1967 – March 29, 1974)	Walter C. Hazlitt (February 27, 1973 – May 23, 1977)	Hermon L. Bishop (July 24, 1961 – March 30, 1976)
1974–1975	Matthew B. Kondenar (March 22, 1965 – January 29, 1997)	H. Ward Ackerson (June 10, 1968 – April 11, 1978)	William A. Frankenbach (March 29, 1974 – 1987)	Walter C. Hazlitt (February 27, 1973 – May 23, 1977)	Hermon L. Bishop (July 24, 1961 – March 30, 1976)
1976	Matthew B. Kondenar (March 22, 1965 – January 29, 1997)	H. Ward Ackerson (June 10, 1968 – April 11, 1978)	William A. Frankenbach (March 29, 1974 – 1987)	Walter C. Hazlitt (February 27, 1973 – May 23, 1977)	vacant
1977	Matthew B. Kondenar (March 22, 1965 – January 29, 1997)	H. Ward Ackerson (June 10, 1968 – April 11, 1978)	William A. Frankenbach (March 29, 1974 – 1987)	Robert J. Flynn (May 24, 1977 – 1987)	Bert R. Friedman (September 28, 1976 – 1987)
1978–1986	Matthew B. Kondenar (March 22, 1965 – January 29, 1997)	Miriam T. Anzel (April 11, 1978 – 1987)	William A. Frankenbach (March 29, 1974 – 1987)	Robert J. Flynn (May 24, 1977 – 1987)	Bert R. Friedman (September 28, 1976 – 1987)
1987–1989	Matthew B. Kondenar (March 22, 1965 – January 29, 1997)	Leon J. Campo (1987 – 1990)	Melvin M. Fritz (1987 – January 4, 2007)	James T. B. Tripp (1987 – May 28, 2002)	Michael E. White (1987 – 1990)
1990	Matthew B. Kondenar (March 22, 1965 – January 29, 1997)	Leon J. Campo (1987 – 1990)	Melvin M. Fritz (1987 – January 4, 2007)	James T. B. Tripp (1987 – May 28, 2002)	Michael A. LoGrande (June 26, 1990 – May 29, 2010)
1991–1996	Matthew B. Kondenar (March 22, 1965 – January 29, 1997)	Eric J. Russo (1991 – March 29, 2006)	Melvin M. Fritz (1987 – January 4, 2007)	James T. B. Tripp (1987 – May 28, 2002)	Michael A. LoGrande (June 26, 1990 – May 29, 2010)
1997–2001	John E. Gee, Jr. (April 15, 1997 – March 29, 2004)	Eric J. Russo (1991 – March 29, 2006)	Melvin M. Fritz (1987 – January 4, 2007)	James T. B. Tripp (1987 – May 28, 2002)	Michael A. LoGrande (June 26, 1990 – May 29, 2010)
2002–2003	John E. Gee, Jr. (April 15, 1997 – March 29, 2004)	Eric J. Russo (1991 – March 29, 2006)	Melvin M. Fritz (1987 – January 4, 2007)	George Proios (May 29, 2002 – May 28, 2007)	Michael A. LoGrande (June 26, 1990 – May 29, 2010)
2004–2005	Bernard Brady (May 11, 2004 – March 29, 2009)	Eric J. Russo (1991 – March 29, 2006)	Melvin M. Fritz (1987 – January 4, 2007)	George Proios (May 29, 2002 – May 28, 2007)	Michael A. LoGrande (June 26, 1990 – May 29, 2010)
2006	Bernard Brady (May 11, 2004 – March 29, 2009)	Patrick G. Halpin (March 30, 2006 – December 18, 2018)	Melvin M. Fritz (1987 – January 4, 2007)	George Proios (May 29, 2002 – May 28, 2007)	Michael A. LoGrande (June 26, 1990 – May 29, 2010)
2007	Bernard Brady (May 11, 2004 – March 29, 2009)	Patrick G. Halpin (March 30, 2006 – December 18, 2018)	Michael J. Deering (March 6, 2007 – December 17, 2007)	George Proios (May 29, 2002 – May 28, 2007)	Michael A. LoGrande (June 26, 1990 – May 29, 2010)
2008	Bernard Brady (May 11, 2004 – March 29, 2009)	Patrick G. Halpin (March 30, 2006 – December 18, 2018)	James F. Gaughran (February 5, 2008 – December 14, 2018)	Jane R. Devine (June 26, 2007 – May 28, 2022)	Michael A. LoGrande (June 26, 1990 – May 29, 2010)
2009	Frank J. Pellegrino (March 30, 2009 – March 29, 2014)	Patrick G. Halpin (March 30, 2006 – December 18, 2018)	James F. Gaughran (February 5, 2008 – December 14, 2018)	Jane R. Devine (June 26, 2007 – May 28, 2022)	Michael A. LoGrande (June 26, 1990 – May 29, 2010)
2010–2013	Frank J. Pellegrino (March 30, 2009 – March 29, 2014)	Patrick G. Halpin (March 30, 2006 – December 18, 2018)	James F. Gaughran (February 5, 2008 – December 14, 2018)	Jane R. Devine (June 26, 2007 – May 28, 2022)	Errol D. Toulon Jr. (May 30, 2010 – December 31, 2017)
2014–2017	Mario R. Mattera (March 30, 2014 – January 1, 2021)	Patrick G. Halpin (March 30, 2006 – December 18, 2018)	James F. Gaughran (February 5, 2008 – December 14, 2018)	Jane R. Devine (June 26, 2007 – May 28, 2022)	Errol D. Toulon Jr. (May 30, 2010 – December 31, 2017)
2018	Mario R. Mattera (March 30, 2014 – January 1, 2021)	Patrick G. Halpin (March 30, 2006 – December 18, 2018)	James F. Gaughran (February 5, 2008 – December 14, 2018)	Jane R. Devine (June 26, 2007 – May 28, 2022)	Timothy H. Bishop (March 20, 2018 – May 29, 2025)
2019–2020	Mario R. Mattera (March 30, 2014 – January 1, 2021)	Elizabeth Mercado (March 5, 2019 – present)^{[note]}	Patrick G. Halpin (December 18, 2018 – March 24, 2023)	Jane R. Devine (June 26, 2007 – May 28, 2022)	Timothy H. Bishop (March 20, 2018 – May 29, 2025)
2021	Jacqueline A. Gordon (February 2, 2021 – March 29, 2024)	Elizabeth Mercado (March 5, 2019 – present)^{[note]}	Patrick G. Halpin (December 18, 2018 – March 24, 2023)	Jane R. Devine (June 26, 2007 – May 28, 2022)	Timothy H. Bishop (March 20, 2018 – May 29, 2025)
2022	Jacqueline A. Gordon (February 2, 2021 – March 29, 2024)	Elizabeth Mercado (March 5, 2019 – present)^{[note]}	Patrick G. Halpin (December 18, 2018 – March 24, 2023)	Charles A. Lefkowitz (June 7, 2022 – May 2, 2023)	Timothy H. Bishop (March 20, 2018 – May 29, 2025)
2023	Jacqueline A. Gordon (February 2, 2021 – March 29, 2024)	Elizabeth Mercado (March 5, 2019 – present)^{[note]}	Charles A. Lefkowitz (May 2, 2023 – present)^{[note]}	John M. Porchia III (June 6, 2023 – present)^{[note]}	Timothy H. Bishop (March 20, 2018 – May 29, 2025)
2024	John Rose (June 4, 2024 – present)^{[note]}	Elizabeth Mercado (March 5, 2019 – present)^{[note]}	Charles A. Lefkowitz (May 2, 2023 – present)^{[note]}	John M. Porchia III (June 6, 2023 – present)^{[note]}	Timothy H. Bishop (March 20, 2018 – May 29, 2025)
2025	John Rose (June 4, 2024 – present)^{[note]}	Elizabeth Mercado (March 5, 2019 – present)^{[note]}	Charles A. Lefkowitz (May 2, 2023 – present)^{[note]}	John M. Porchia III (June 6, 2023 – present)^{[note]}	William Davidson (November 25, 2025 – present)^{[note]}
2026	John Rose (June 4, 2024 – present)^{[note]}	Elizabeth Mercado (March 5, 2019 – present)^{[note]}	Charles A. Lefkowitz (May 2, 2023 – present)^{[note]}	John M. Porchia III (June 6, 2023 – present)^{[note]}	William Davidson (November 25, 2025 – present)^{[note]}

Notes

- John Rose's current term expires on March 29, 2029.
- Elizabeth Mercado's current term expires on March 29, 2026.
- Charles A. Lefkowitz's current term expires on March 24, 2028.
- John M. Porchia III's current term expires on May 28, 2027.
- William Davidson's current term expires on May 29, 2030.

== See also ==
- Long Island Power Authority
- New York City Water Supply System
