= Carl Marcellino =

American politician (1942–2026)

Member of the New York State Senate from the 5th district
- In office March 15, 1995 – December 31, 2018
- Preceded by: Ralph J. Marino
- Succeeded by: Jim Gaughran

Personal details
- Born: December 23, 1942 New York City, U.S.
- Died: February 18, 2026 (aged 83)
- Party: Republican
- Spouse: Patricia Marcellino
- Children: 2
- Education: New York University (BA, MA)

Carl L. Marcellino (December 23, 1942 – February 18, 2026) was an American politician who served as a member of the New York State Senate from 1995 to 2018. He was first elected in a March 1995 special election following the resignation of former state senate majority leader Ralph J. Marino, before being defeated by Jim Gaughran in 2018. Marcellino represented the 5th district, which comprises parts of Nassau and Suffolk counties on Long Island, as a member of the Republican Party.

== Life and career ==
=== Early life and education ===
Marcellino was born in New York City on December 23, 1942. He attended public schools in Queens, New York. Marcellino received a Bachelor of Arts and Master of Science degree from New York University. He worked as a science teacher and administrator in the New York City school system for 20 years. Prior to serving in the State Senate, he was Town Clerk of Oyster Bay.

=== New York State Senate ===
In November 1994, Ralph J. Marino, who had represented the area around the Nassau-Suffolk line since 1969, was deposed from his post as Senate Majority Leader. After Marino resigned from office, a special election was called for on March 13, 1995. Marcellino was nominated by Republicans to face Mary A. McCaffery, a Democrat who worked as a fund-raiser for nonprofit agencies. He would go on to easily win that race with 60% of the vote. Marcellino would go on to win re-election eleven times, only facing serious opposition in 2016; that year, Marcellino defeated challenger Jim Gaughran by only 1,761 votes. In 2018, Gaughran challenged Marcellino again. This time, Gaughran prevailed.

In 2011, Marcellino voted against allowing same-sex marriage in New York during a senate roll-call vote on the Marriage Equality Act, which the Senate narrowly passed 33–29. He also voted in favor of the 2013 gun control law known as the NY SAFE Act.

=== Personal life and death ===
Marcellino and his wife Patricia resided in Syosset, New York, and had two children, Jean and Carl. Marcellino died on February 18, 2026, at the age of 83.

== See also ==
- 2009 New York State Senate leadership crisis

New York State Senate
Preceded by Ralph J. Marino	Member of the New York State Senate from the 5th district March 15, 1995 – December 31, 2018	Succeeded by Jim Gaughran
Political offices
Preceded by Craig M. Johnson	Chairman of the Senate Committee on Investigations and Government Operations; 2011–2015	Succeeded by Andrew Lanza
Preceded by John J. Flanagan	Chairman of the Senate Committee on Education; 2015–2018	Succeeded by Shelley Mayer
