= Charles J. Fuschillo Jr. =

American politician

Member of the New York State Senate from the 8th district
- In office March 25, 1998 – December 31, 2013
- Preceded by: Norman J. Levy
- Succeeded by: Michael Venditto

Personal details
- Born: July 1, 1960 (age 66) Westbury, New York, U.S.
- Party: Republican

Charles J. Fuschillo, Jr. (born July 1, 1960) is a former Republican member of the New York State Senate from Long Island. From 1998 to 2013, he represented the 8th State Senate district, which spans several South Shore communities in both Nassau and Suffolk Counties, which included the communities of Wantagh, Merrick, Bellmore, Massapequa Park, Freeport, Roosevelt, Seaford, Amityville, and Copiague, as well as parts of Massapequa, Farmingdale, Baldwin, Lindenhurst, West Babylon, Wheatley Heights, and Wyandanch. Senator Fuschillo resigned from the New York State Senate on December 31, 2013 to serve as the president and CEO of the Alzheimer's Foundation of America.

== Biography ==
Fuschillo was born in Westbury, New York, and graduated from Carle Place High School. He then attended Nassau Community College and later earned a Bachelor of Business Administration degree from Adelphi University, majoring in Finance.

Prior to being elected to the New York State Senate, Fuschillo served as the Chief Operating Officer of a private, not-for-profit family service agency where he managed over four hundred employees and forty human service programs throughout Long Island and the five boroughs of New York City.

Fuschillo currently serves as the president and CEO of the Alzheimer's Foundation of America (AFA).

== Political activities ==
Fuschillo has been a campaigner against drunk driving in New York State. He sponsored "Leandra's Law," which makes it a felony to drive drunk with a child in the car and requires all convicted drunk drivers to use ignition interlocks to prevent them from drinking and driving again. He sponsored laws which lowered New York State's legal blood alcohol content (BAC) level from .10 to .08; enacted tougher penalties for repeat offenders and those who drive with an elevated BAC; and expanded the use of ignition interlock devices to keep convicted DWI offenders from drinking and driving again.

Fuschillo helped create the Broad Hollow Bioscience Park at Farmingdale State College, which serves as a home to established and startup biotechnology companies and provides high-tech jobs for Long Islanders. In April 2011, he authored a law to expand Broad Hollow Bioscience Park to create new jobs and promote economic development.

Fuschillo sponsored complete streets legislation which would require all state, county, and local transportation agencies in New York State to consider complete streets design principles on all projects which receive both federal and state funding. Complete streets design principles are roadway design features that accommodate and facilitate safe travel by pedestrians, bicyclists, and motorists of all ages and abilities. The legislation was approved by the New York State Legislature in June 2011 and signed into law two months later. The New York League of Conservation Voters named him a 2011 Eco-Star for his efforts in getting the law passed.

Fuschillo also sponsored a statewide ban on over-the-counter products containing the dangerous dietary supplement ephedra. Fuschillo has authored child safety laws, and helped secure new educational technology for local school districts. Additionally, he sponsored a statewide ban on dangerous drop-side cribs, which have been linked to numerous child deaths and injuries.

Fuschillo authored a law, signed on November 1, 2011, to prevent insurance companies from denying treatments and therapies for autism. Autism Speaks, a national autism advocacy organization, named Fuschillo a "legislative champion" in 2012 for authoring the law.

== Personal background ==
Fuschillo and his wife, Ellen, reside in Merrick with their 3 children, Daniel, Chad, and Catie.

== Community involvement ==
Fuschillo is involved with local organizations, including Kiwanis, the Chamber of Commerce, the Community Wellness Council, Italian Americans in Government, and Order Sons of Italy in America. He served as a coach for the Police Athletic League.

== See also ==
- 2009 New York State Senate leadership crisis

New York State Senate
| Preceded by Norman J. Levy | New York State Senate, 8th District; 1998–2013 | Succeeded by Michael Venditto |
Political offices
| Preceded by Martin Malave Dilan | Chairman of the Senate Committee on Transportation; 2011–2013 | Succeeded by Joseph Robach |
