= Kimberly Jean-Pierre =

New York politician

Member of the New York State Assembly from the 11th district
- In office January 1, 2015 – December 31, 2024
- Preceded by: Robert Sweeney
- Succeeded by: Kwani O'Pharrow

Personal details
- Born: March 17, 1984 (age 42)
- Party: Democratic
- Education: Brooklyn College (BA); Stony Brook University (MA)
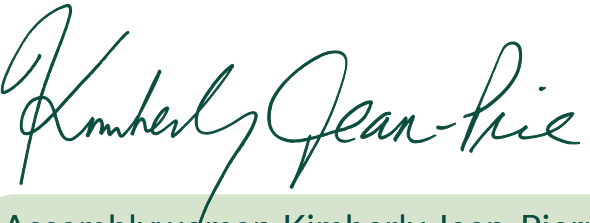
- Signature
- Website: Official website

Kimberly Jean-Pierre is an American politician who served as a member of the New York Assembly for the 11th district, which includes portions of the town of Babylon in Suffolk County. A Democrat, she was first elected in 2014 and announced she would not seek reelection in 2024.

== Early life and education ==
Jean-Pierre is of Haitian-American descent, and graduated from Brooklyn College and later received a master's degree in public policy from Stony Brook University. Prior to elected office Jean-Pierre worked for the Suffolk County Legislature as a legislative aide to DuWayne Gregory. She later worked for Congressman Steve Israel as a Community Outreach Coordinator, and later for the Town of Babylon's Industrial Development Agency.

== New York State Assembly ==
In 2014, Assemblyman Robert Sweeney decided to retire, leaving the district open for the first time in twenty six years. Jean-Pierre announced her run, and easily attained the nomination before going to win the election with 58% of the vote. She easily won reelection in 2016 and 2018. In the Assembly, Jean-Pierre serves as Chair of the Subcommittee on Banking in Underserved Communities.

In 2022, Jean-Pierre was narrowly reelected by under 1% against Republican. She announced that she would not run for reelection in 2024 days after the candidate filing deadline, allowing the Suffolk County Democratic Party to replace her on the ballot without a primary.

Political offices
Preceded by Robert Sweeney	New York Assembly, 11th District; 2015–present	Incumbent
