= Ralph J. Marino =

American politician (1928–2002)

Temporary President and Majority Leader of the New York State Senate
- In office January 1, 1989 – November 25, 1994
- Preceded by: Warren M. Anderson
- Succeeded by: Joseph Bruno

Member of the New York State Senate
- In office January 1, 1969 – February 8, 1995
- Preceded by: Henry M. Curran
- Succeeded by: Carl Marcellino
- Constituency: 3rd district (1969-1972); 5th district (1973-1995)

Personal details
- Born: Ralph John Marino; January 2, 1928 Rochester, New York, U.S.
- Died: April 6, 2002 (aged 74) Rockville Centre, New York, U.S.
- Party: Republican
- Spouse: Ethel Bernstein
- Children: 3
- Education: Syracuse University; Fordham University School of Law

Ralph John Marino (January 2, 1928 – April 6, 2002) was an American lawyer and politician from New York. He was Temporary President of the New York State Senate from 1989 to 1994.

== Life ==
Marino was born on January 2, 1928, in Rochester, New York. He served in the U.S. Army from 1946 to 1947. He graduated from Syracuse University in 1951; and from Fordham University School of Law in 1954. He met his wife Ethel Bernstein while studying at Syracuse. They married in 1954, and settled in her hometown of Oyster Bay on Long Island, and had three children. Marino practiced law in Oyster Bay, and entered politics as a Republican.

Generally considered a Rockefeller Republican, he was first elected to the Senate in 1968 and became known for protecting Long Island's interests in Albany. He succeeded Warren M. Anderson as Temporary President and Majority Leader in 1989.

He was one of the very few downstate politicians to hold the Senate Majority Leader position and the first Long Islander to hold the position. Marino frequently sparred with Governor Mario Cuomo on the budget. The budget grew under his tenure as majority leader by some 50%.

He opposed George Pataki's nomination for governor in 1994. Pataki won the election, and as de facto party leader engineered a caucus room coup against Marino with the aid of much more conservative Republicans from Upstate and Western New York. Despite the fact that Marino's deputy and closest ally, Jess J. Present, was in fact from Western New York, Pataki's opposition and the growth of the budget resulted in his ouster in November 1994. He was succeeded by Joseph Bruno, a conservative from the Capital District.

After sitting in the 178th, 179th, 180th, 181st, 182nd, 183rd, 184th, 185th, 186th, 187th, 188th, 189th, 190th and 191st New York State Legislatures, Marino resigned his Senate seat on February 8, 1995.

He died on April 6, 2002, in Mercy Medical Center in Rockville Centre, New York, of tongue cancer. His wife Ethel died May 10, 2004.

== Sources ==
New York State Senate
Preceded by Henry M. Curran	New York State Senate; 3rd District; 1969–1972	Succeeded by Caesar Trunzo
Preceded by John D. Caemmerer	New York State Senate; 5th District; 1973–1995	Succeeded by Carl Marcellino
Political offices
Preceded by Warren M. Anderson	Temporary President of the State Senate; 1989–1994	Succeeded by Joseph Bruno
