= Steven Rhoads =

American politician

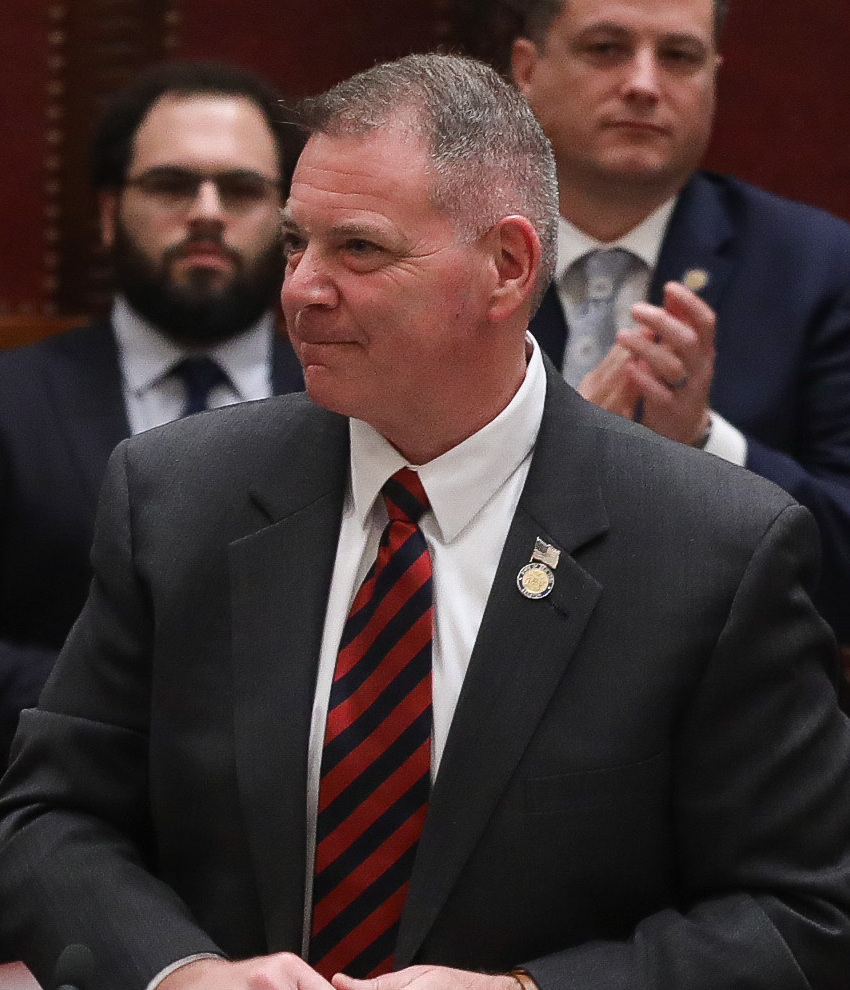
- Rhoads in 2023

Member of the New York Senate from the 5th district
- Incumbent
- Assumed office January 1, 2023
- Preceded by: John Brooks (redistricting)

Personal details
- Party: Republican

Steven Rhoads is an American politician who currently represents New York's 5th State Senate district in the New York State Senate. He was elected in the 2022 New York State Senate election, defeating incumbent Democrat John Brooks, who was redistricted from the 8th district. He is a member of the Republican Party.

== Political positions ==
Rhoads has described the Metropolitan Transportation Authority (MTA), which oversees public transit in New York, as "Money Thrown Away." In 2023, he opposed a plan to implement congestion pricing in lower Manhattan, New York City.

== Electoral history ==
2022 New York's 5th State Senate district election
Party	Candidate	Votes	%
Republican	Steven Rhoads	79,486	60.91%
Democratic	John Brooks (incumbent)	50,985	39.07%
Write-in		22	0.01%
Total votes		130,493	100%
Republican gain from Democratic			
