= Michael Venditto =

American politician

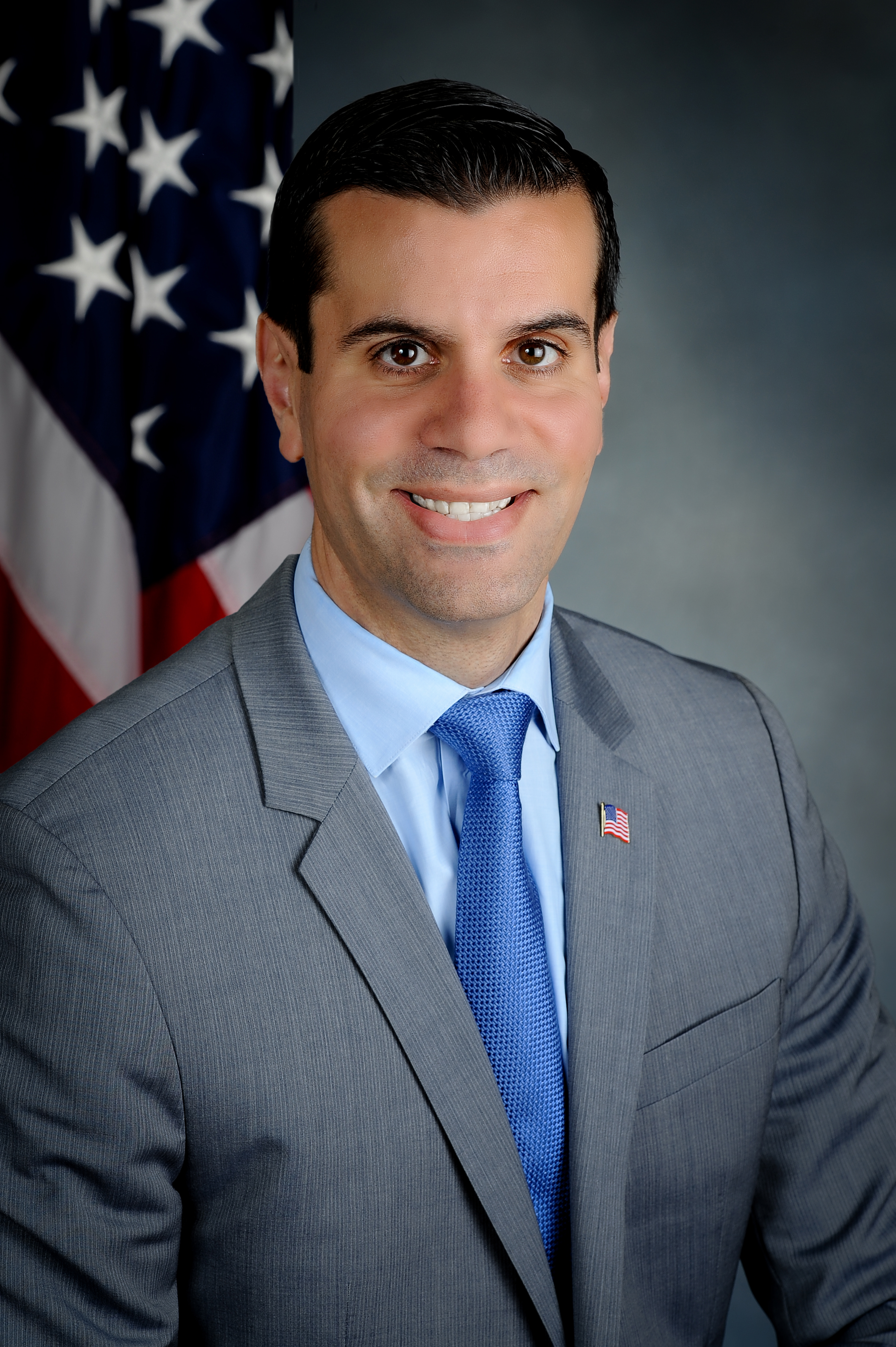

Member of the New York State Senate from the 8th district
- In office January 1, 2015 – December 31, 2016
- Preceded by: Charles Fuschillo
- Succeeded by: John Brooks

Member of the Nassau County Board of Legislators from the 12th District
- In office November 19, 2012 – December 31, 2014
- Preceded by: Peter J. Schmitt
- Succeeded by: James Kennedy

Personal details
- Born: June 30, 1981 (age 45) Massapequa, New York, U.S.
- Party: Republican
- Spouse: Antonella Venditto
- Children: 2
- Education: St. John's University (BA); Hofstra University (JD)
- Website: NY Senate Website

Michael Venditto (born June 30, 1981, in Massapequa, New York) is a former New York State Senator, previously representing District 8, which comprises the South Shore of Long Island beginning with Baldwin in the West and ending with West Babylon in the East. A Republican, he was first elected in 2014, he served as Chairman of the Consumer Protection Committee, and on the Codes, Higher Education, Insurance, Judiciary, Labor, Libraries, and Crime Victims, Crime and Correction committees and on the Heroin Task Force.

Before his election to the state senate, Venditto served as a Nassau County Legislator from the 12th District, replacing the deceased Presiding Officer Peter J. Schmitt. Venditto began his career working as an attorney for the Town of Hempstead, New York.

== Early life and education ==
Venditto has spent his entire life in the South Shore communities that make up the 8th Senate District. He attended public schools and graduated from Farmingdale High School. He earned his B.A. from Hofstra University and his J.D. from St. John's University School of Law. He resides in the hamlet of Massapequa, New York with his wife Antonella and their children. His father, John Venditto, served as Town of Oyster Bay Town Supervisor from 1998 to 2017.

== New York State Senate ==
Venditto ran for the New York State Senate in 2014 to succeed former Senator Charles Fuschillo, who resigned to become the head of the Alzheimer's Foundation. Michael, on the Republican, Conservative, and Independence lines, won with 56.7% of the vote.

Political offices
Preceded by Charles Fuschillo	New York Senate, 8th District; 2015–2016	Succeeded by John E. Brooks
