= New York's 7th State Assembly district =

American legislative district

Assemblymember
Jarett Gandolfo; R–Sayville
- Registration: 36.0% Republican; 29.0% Democratic; 27.4% No party preference
- Demographics: 78% White; 3% Black; 15% Hispanic; 2% Asian; 0% Native American; 0% Hawaiian/Pacific Islander; 0% Other
- Population (2020): 122,792
- Registered voters: 100,162

New York's 7th State Assembly district is one of the 150 districts in the New York State Assembly. It has been represented by Republican Jarett Gandolfo since 2021, replacing Andrew Garbarino. In 2026, he announced he would run for the New York State Senate and would not seek re-election to the Assembly.

== Geography ==
=== 2020s ===
District 7 is in Suffolk County. It includes portions of the towns of Islip and Brookhaven, including the villages of Brightwaters, and Patchogue, as well as the hamlets of Bay Shore, Great River, North Great River, Oakdale, Bohemia, West Sayville, Sayville, Bayport, Blue Point, and East Patchogue. Fire Island proper is within this district.

The district is entirely within New York's 2nd congressional district, and mostly overlaps New York's 4th State Senate district, with a small portion of the 8th district.

=== 2010s ===
District 7 is in Suffolk County. It includes portions of the towns of Islip and Brookhaven, including the villages of Brightwaters, and Patchogue, as well as the hamlets of Bay Shore, Great River, Oakdale, Bohemia, West Sayville, Sayville, Bayport, Blue Point, and East Patchogue.

== Recent election results ==
=== 2026 ===
2026 New York State Assembly election, District 3
Party	Candidate	Votes	%
Republican	DawnMarie Kuhn		
Conservative	DawnMarie Kuhn		
Total	DawnMarie Kuhn		
Democratic	Patricia Kopp		
Working Families	Patricia Kopp		
Total	Patricia Kopp		
Write-in			
Total votes			

=== 2024 ===
2024 New York State Assembly election, District 7
Party	Candidate	Votes	%
Republican	Jarett Gandolfo	36,819	
Conservative	Jarett Gandolfo	5,837	
Total	Jarett Gandolfo (incumbent)	42,656	63.0
Democratic	Garrett Petersen	25,003	37.0
Write-in		18	0.0
Total votes		67,677	100.0
Republican hold			

=== 2022 ===
2022 New York State Assembly election, District 7
Party	Candidate	Votes	%
Republican	Jarett Gandolfo	28,768	
Conservative	Jarett Gandolfo	6,170	
Total	Jarett Gandolfo (incumbent)	34,938	65.0
Democratic	Douglas Pearsall	18,842	35.0
Write-in		7	0.0
Total votes		53,787	100.0
Republican hold			

=== 2020 ===
2020 New York State Assembly election, District 7
Party	Candidate	Votes	%
Republican	Jarett Gandolfo	33,528	
Conservative	Jarett Gandolfo	5,238	
Independence	Jarett Gandolfo	874	
Total	Jarett Gandolfo	39,640	60.4
Democratic	Francis Genco	26,035	39.6
Write-in		9	0.0
Total votes		65,684	100.0
Republican hold			

=== 2018 ===
2018 New York State Assembly election, District 7
Primary election
Party	Candidate	Votes	%
Women's Equality	Andrew Garbarino (incumbent)	2	100.0
Women's Equality	Thomas Murray III	0	0.0
Write-in		0	0.0
Total votes		2	100
General election
Republican	Andrew Garbarino	24,552	
Conservative	Andrew Garbarino	3,257	
Independence	Andrew Garbarino	813	
Women's Equality	Andrew Garbarino	348	
Reform	Andrew Garbarino	105	
Total	Andrew Garbarino (incumbent)	29,075	58.7
Democratic	Thomas Murray III	20,452	41.3
Write-in		13	0.0
Total votes		49,540	100.0
Republican hold			

=== 2016 ===
2016 New York State Assembly election, District 7
Party	Candidate	Votes	%
Republican	Andrew Garbarino	29,674	
Conservative	Andrew Garbarino	3,273	
Independence	Andrew Garbarino	1,067	
Reform	Andrew Garbarino	191	
Total	Andrew Garbarino (incumbent)	38,235	67.2
Democratic	Nickolas Gambini	18,653	32.8
Write-in		26	0.0
Total votes		56,914	100.0
Republican hold			

=== 2014 ===
2014 New York State Assembly election, District 7
Party	Candidate	Votes	%
Republican	Andrew Garbarino	15,839	
Conservative	Andrew Garbarino	3,647	
Independence	Andrew Garbarino	1,351	
Total	Andrew Garbarino (incumbent)	20,837	69.5
Democratic	Deborah Pfeiffer	9,162	30.5
Write-in		10	0.0
Total votes		30,007	100.0
Republican hold			

=== 2012 ===
2012 New York State Assembly election, District 7
Party	Candidate	Votes	%
Republican	Andrew Garbarino	22,174	
Conservative	Andrew Garbarino	4,672	
Independence	Andrew Garbarino	1,414	
Main Street	Andrew Garbarino	241	
Total	Andrew Garbarino	28,501	56.8
Democratic	Christopher Bodkin	21,701	43.2
Write-in		9	0.0
Total votes		50,211	100.0
Republican hold			
