= New York's 5th State Senate district =

American legislative district

Senator
Steven Rhoads; R–Bellmore
- Registration: 35.3% Democratic; 31.8% Republican; 26.7% No party preference
- Demographics: 74% White; 3% Black; 12% Hispanic; 9% Asian
- Population (2017): 316,196
- Registered voters: 240,199

New York's 5th State Senate district is one of 63 districts in the New York State Senate. It has been represented by Republican Steven Rhoads since 2023.

== Geography ==
District 5 covers parts of Nassau and Suffolk counties in Long Island, including Glen Cove, Oyster Bay, and Northport.

The district is located entirely within New York's 3rd congressional district, and overlaps with the 10th, 12th, 13th, 15th, and 19th districts of the New York State Assembly.

== Recent election results ==
=== 2026 ===
2026 New York State Senate election, District 5
Party	Candidate	Votes	%
Republican	Steven Rhoads		
Conservative	Steven Rhoads		
Total	Steven Rhoads (incumbent)		
Democratic	Andrew Piddoubny		
Write-in			
Total votes			

=== 2024 ===
2024 New York State Senate election, District 5
Party	Candidate	Votes	%
Republican	Steven Rhoads	98,005	
Conservative	Steven Rhoads	8,240	
Total	Steven Rhoads (incumbent)	106,245	61.3
Democratic	Lisa Lin	66,977	38.6
Write-in		222	0.1
Total votes		173,444	100.0
Republican hold			

=== 2022 (redistricting) ===
2022 New York State Senate election, District 3
Party	Candidate	Votes	%
Republican	Steven Rhoads	73,844	
Conservative	Steven Rhoads	6,849	
Total	Steven Rhoads	80,693	60.8
Democratic	John Brooks	50,191	
Working Families	John Brooks	1,919	
Total	John Brooks (incumbent)	52,110	39.2
Write-in		23	0.0
Total votes		132,826	100.0
Republican win (new boundaries)			

=== 2020 ===
2020 New York State Senate election, District 5
Party	Candidate	Votes	%
Democratic	Jim Gaughran	84,137	
SAM	Jim Gaughran	343	
Total	Jim Gaughran (incumbent)	84,480	50.4
Republican	Edmund Smyth	71,832	
Conservative	Edmund Smyth	7,364	
Independence	Edmund Smyth	1,326	
Libertarian	Edmund Smyth	741	
Total	Edmund Smyth	81,263	48.5
Green	Barbara Wagner	1,831	1.1
Write-in		37	0.0
Total votes		167,611	100.0
Democratic hold			

=== 2018 ===
2018 New York State Senate election, District 5
Party	Candidate	Votes	%
Democratic	Jim Gaughran	65,673	
Working Families	Jim Gaughran	1,465	
Women's Equality	Jim Gaughran	889	
Total	Jim Gaughran	68,027	54.9
Republican	Carl Marcellino	49,411	
Conservative	Carl Marcellino	5,223	
Independence	Carl Marcellino	952	
Reform	Carl Marcellino	239	
Total	Carl Marcellino (incumbent)	55,825	45.1
Write-in		29	0.0
Total votes		123,881	100.0
Democratic gain from Republican			

=== 2016 ===
2016 New York State Senate election, District 5
Party	Candidate	Votes	%
Republican	Carl Marcellino	64,256	
Conservative	Carl Marcellino	7,736	
Independence	Carl Marcellino	1,666	
Reform	Carl Marcellino	368	
Total	Carl Marcellino (incumbent)	74,026	50.6
Democratic	Jim Gaughran	68,888	
Working Families	Jim Gaughran	2,394	
Women's Equality	Jim Gaughran	983	
Total	Jim Gaughran	72,265	49.4
Write-in		101	0.0
Total votes		146,392	100.0
Republican hold			

=== 2014 ===
2014 New York State Senate election, District 5
Party	Candidate	Votes	%
Republican	Carl Marcellino	38,555	
Conservative	Carl Marcellino	5,565	
Independence	Carl Marcellino	2,356	
Total	Carl Marcellino (incumbent)	46,476	60.4
Democratic	Bruce Kennedy Jr.	27,219	
Working Families	Bruce Kennedy Jr.	2,513	
Total	Bruce Kennedy Jr.	29,732	38.6
Libertarian	Georgina Bowman	738	1.0
Write-in		20	0.0
Total votes		76,966	100.0
Republican hold			

=== 2012 ===
2012 New York State Senate election, District 5
Party	Candidate	Votes	%
Republican	Carl Marcellino	62,124	
Conservative	Carl Marcellino	7,951	
Independence	Carl Marcellino	3,345	
Tax Revolt Party	Carl Marcellino	527	
Total	Carl Marcellino (incumbent)	73,947	59.8
Democratic	David Wright	49,647	40.2
Write-in		42	0.0
Total votes		123,636	100.0
Republican hold			

=== Federal results in District 5 ===
Year	Office	Results
2020	President	Biden 54.2 – 44.3%
2016	President	Clinton 50.0 – 47.0%
2012	President	Romney 50.3 – 48.7%
2012	Senate	Gillibrand 60.3 – 38.5%
