= Kwani O'Pharrow =

American politician from New York City

Kwani B. O'Pharrow
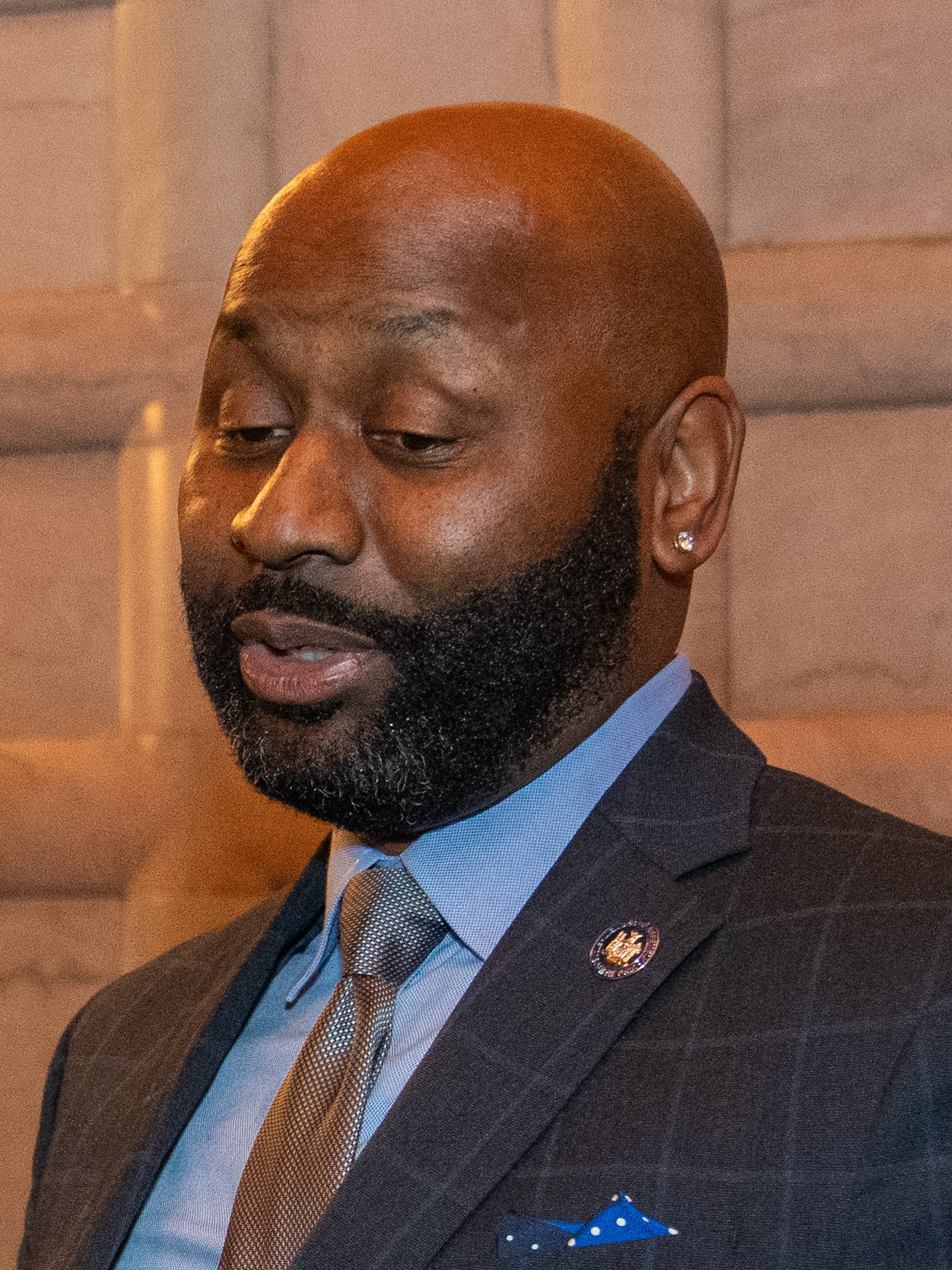
- O'Pharrow in 2025

Member of the New York State Assembly from the 11th district
- Incumbent
- Assumed office January 1, 2025
- Preceded by: Kimberly Jean-Pierre

Personal details
- Born: September 28, 1971 (age 55) Brooklyn, New York, U.S.
- Party: Democratic
- Spouse: Cindy
- Children: 4
- Website: https://newyorkersforkwani.com/

Kwani O'Pharrow is an American politician. He has served in the New York State Assembly representing the 11th district since 2025. A Democrat, he represents parts of Suffolk and Nassau counties.

In the 2024 New York State Assembly election, he held the seat for the Democrats following then-incumbent Kimberly Jean-Pierre's decision not to stand for re-election.

== Career ==
O'Pharrow's previous career included positions within the United States Navy and New York City Police Department. His most recent NYPD position was with the New York City Police Department Intelligence Bureau. He is also a certified USA Boxing boxing coach, DCJS Instructor Co-founded Cops N’ Kids Long Island, Co-founded Student And Community Relations Officers (SACRO) and served as President of Starrett City Boxing, a Brooklyn-based sports organization founded by his grandfather, James "Jimmy O" Pharrow. Prior to seeking political office, he was a school safety supervisor within the Brentwood Union Free School District.
