= Patrick G. Halpin =

American politician (born 1953)

Patrick Halpin
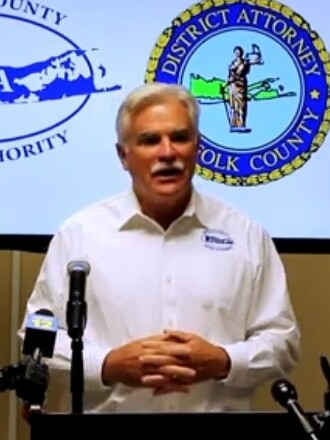
- Halpin at a Suffolk County Water Authority press conference, 2021

5th Executive of Suffolk County
- In office January 1, 1988 – December 31, 1991
- Preceded by: Michael LoGrande
- Succeeded by: Robert J. Gaffney

Member of the New York State Assembly from the 11th district
- In office January 1, 1983 – December 31, 1987
- Preceded by: Philip B. Healey
- Succeeded by: Robert K. Sweeney

Member of the New York State Assembly from the 9th district
- In office April 20, 1982 – December 31, 1982
- Preceded by: Louis Howard
- Succeeded by: John Flanagan

Personal details
- Born: Patrick Goodchild Halpin; January 18, 1953 (age 73)
- Party: Democratic
- Spouse(s): Debra Randazzo (m. 1985; div. 2009) Ana Rua (m. 2013)
- Children: 2
- Education: Old Dominion University (BA)

Patrick Goodchild Halpin (born January 18, 1953) is an American politician who served as the fifth county executive of Suffolk County, New York, from 1988 to 1991. Halpin succeeded Jim Gaughran as Chair of the Suffolk County Water Authority on December 18, 2018.

== Education and career ==
Halpin grew up on Long Island and attended St. Joseph's School in Babylon. He attended Old Dominion University in Norfolk, Virginia, where he earned a B.A. degree in political science and economics. After college he was a political campaign volunteer and became a campaign staffer for Tom Downey, who was first elected to the United States House of Representatives in 1974. He later became a congressional aide for Downey.

Halpin's own political career began at age 26 in 1979, when he was elected to represent the 13th District of the Suffolk County Legislature. On April 20, 1982, he was elected to the New York State Assembly, to fill the vacancy caused by the election of Louis T. Howard to the Suffolk County Legislature. Halpin was the first Democrat in 116 years to be elected to the Assembly from that area. He was re-elected three times and remained in the Assembly until 1987, sitting in the 184th, 185th, 186th and 187th New York State Legislatures. He chaired the Committee on Ethics, and the Subcommittee on the Long Island Marine Resources.

In 1987, Halpin was elected Suffolk County Executive, at age 34 the youngest in the county's history. His achievements include instituting the drug education program DARE; an anti-domestic violence program; a homeless housing initiative; and a nationally-recognized open space and environmental program. He served one term from 1988 to 1992, when he was defeated by Robert J. Gaffney.

In 1994, Halpin became Executive Vice President at the Institute for Student Achievement, located in Lake Success on Long Island. The Institute works in partnership with schools to help low-performing students stay in school, graduate and go on to college, work, other post-secondary education or job training.

Halpin was a managing director of Mercury Public Affairs LLC.

In March 2006, Halpin was confirmed by the Suffolk County Legislature to a five-year term on the Suffolk County Water Authority (SCWA). Halpin was re-appointed in March 2011 and March 2016. On December 18, 2018, Halpin was appointed as the Chair of the SCWA to replace Jim Gaughran, who resigned upon his election to the New York State Senate.

He is a candidate for the 2nd Congressional District in 2026.
