= John Brooks (New York politician) =

American politician

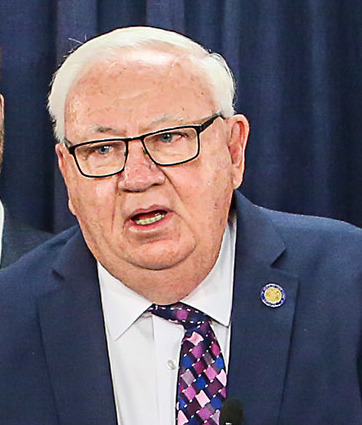

Member of the New York State Senate from the 8th district
- In office January 1, 2017 – December 31, 2022
- Preceded by: Michael Venditto
- Succeeded by: Steven Rhoads (Redistricting)

Personal details
- Born: December 8, 1949 (age 76) Seaford, New York, U.S.
- Party: Democratic (2017–present)
- Other political affiliations: Republican (before 2017)
- Education: New York Institute of Technology (Bachelor's degree)
- Website: Official website

John Brooks (born December 8, 1949) is an American politician who served as a Democratic member of the New York State Senate from the 8th district from 2017 to 2023.

== Early life and education ==
Born and raised on Long Island, Brooks earned an associate's degree from Farmingdale State College and a bachelor's degree from the New York Institute of Technology.

== Career ==
Brooks served for more than forty-five years with the Seaford, New York Fire Department. Brooks subsequently served as a member of the Seaford Board of Education. An insurance broker, Brooks also worked for Geico and United States Capital Insurance, and later served as Nassau County's Director of Risk Management. Brooks also served in the armed services as with the Rainbow Division of the New York Army National Guard as a medic.

=== New York State Senate ===
In 2016, Brooks chose to run for the 8th Senate District seat held by Michael Venditto. Despite being a registered Republican, Brooks chose to accept the Democratic line. Brooks was unopposed in the primary. In October after the arrest of Venditto's father, Supervisor John Venditto, on corruption charges, along with Ed Mangano, Brooks finally decided to campaign for the seat. The Democratic Senate Campaign Committee and Brooks viewed Venditto as a free target despite having nothing to do with the scandal.

On election night, Venditto was thought to have won by more than 2,000 votes, but when additional ballots were counted, Brooks pulled into the lead by less than 100 votes. Ballots were subsequently recounted. In the end, Brooks won by only 314 votes out of over 150,000 cast to take the seat.

In the 2018 election, Brooks defeated Republican challenger Jeff Pravato by more than 10,000 votes. Effective January 2019, Brooks has been named Chair of the Veterans, Homeland Security and Military Affairs Committee.

His district includes portions of Amityville, Freeport, Lindenhurst and Massapequa Park as well as the unincorporated villages of Baldwin, Baldwin Harbor, Bellmore, Copiague, East Farmingdale, East Massapequa, Massapequa, Merrick, North Amityville, North Bellmore, North Lindenhurst, North Merrick, Roosevelt, Seaford, South Farmingdale, Wantagh, West Babylon, Wheatley Heights and Wyandanch on Long Island. Brooks, despite being a member of the Democratic caucus, was a registered Republican until after the 2017 local elections.

In 2022, Brooks voted with all Senate Democrats against getting rid of school mask mandates.

== See also ==
- List of New York state senators

New York State Senate
Preceded by Michael Venditto	Member of the New York State Senate from the 8th district 2017–2022	Succeeded by Alexis Weik
