= Robert K. Sweeney =

American politician

Member of the New York State Assembly from the 11th district
- In office 1988–2014
- Preceded by: Patrick G. Halpin
- Succeeded by: Kimberly Jean-Pierre

Personal details
- Born: May 29, 1949 (age 77) Babylon, New York
- Party: Democratic
- Education: Adelphi University; C.W. Post Campus-LIU
- Occupation: former Lindenhurst Village Clerk
- Website: Official website

Robert K. "Bob" Sweeney (born May 29, 1949) is a retired New York Assemblyman first elected in 1988 to represent the 11th district, which includes Lindenhurst, Copiague, Amityville, Wyandanch, and West Babylon. He is a Democrat.

Sweeney is a lifetime resident of the district he represents and attended public schools in Lindenhurst. He earned a bachelor's degree from Adelphi University and a Master of Public Administration from the C.W. Post Campus of Long Island University. He served as the Lindenhurst Village Clerk from 1973 to 1988.

Sweeney was elected to the New York State Assembly in a March 1988 special election. He replaced Patrick G. Halpin, who was elected Suffolk County Executive in November 1987. He retired in 2014 and was succeeded by Kimberly Jean Pierre.

New York State Assembly
Preceded by Patrick G. Halpin	New York State Assembly; 11th District; 1988–2014	Succeeded by Kimberly Jean-Pierre
