= Alzheimer's Foundation of America =

US non-profit organisation

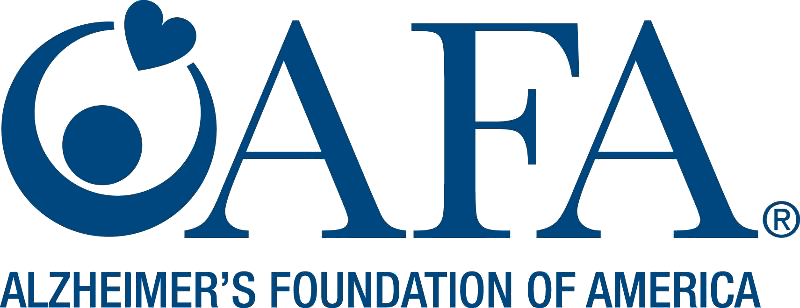
- Founded: 2002
- Coordinates: 40.753685°N 73.999164°W
- Region served: United States
- Key people: Bert E. Brodsky (Founder and Chair); Charles J. Fuschillo Jr. (President and CEO)
- Website: alzfdn.org

The Alzheimer's Foundation of America (AFA) is an American nonprofit organization based in New York City whose mission is to provide support, services and education to individuals, families and caregivers affected by Alzheimer's disease and related dementias nationwide, and fund research for better treatment and a cure. AFA unites more than 2,000 member organizations from coast-to-coast that are dedicated to meeting the educational, social, emotional and practical needs of individuals with Alzheimer's disease and related illnesses, and their caregivers and families. Member organizations include grassroots Alzheimer's agencies, senior centers, adult daycare center, home healthcare agencies, long-term care residences, research facilities, and other dementia-related groups. AFA holds Charity Navigator's highest rating of 4 stars.

== Disease background ==
Experts believe that an estimated 5.5 million Americans have Alzheimer's disease. The number of people with Alzheimer's disease doubles for every 5-year interval beyond age 65. The Centers for Disease Control issued a report in 2017 showing that Alzheimer's-related deaths increased by 54.5% between 1999 and 2014.

Unless the disease can be effectively treated or prevented, the number of Americans with Alzheimer's disease will increase significantly; projections are that as many as 13.8 million Americans ages 65 and over will be affected by the year 2050. On January 4, 2011, President Barack Obama signed into law the National Alzheimer's Project Act (NAPA), requiring the Secretary of the U.S. Department of Health and Human Services (HHS) to establish the National Alzheimer's Project to, in part, create and maintain an integrated national plan to overcome Alzheimer's disease; and accelerate the development of treatments that would prevent, halt or reverse the course of Alzheimer's disease. In May 2012, HHS released its "National Plan to Address Alzheimer's Disease".

== Leadership ==
The Alzheimer's Foundation of America was founded by Bert E. Brodsky after his experiences serving as a caregiver for his mother, Anne, who lived with Alzheimer's disease from 1980 to 1992. Eric J. Hall was the founding CEO of the organization and put together the infrastructure which still exists to this day. He felt at that time there was little information available and nowhere to turn to for help and founded AFA with the goal of ensuring no other family living with Alzheimer's disease would have to go through the journey alone.

The Alzheimer's Foundation of America's current President & Chief Executive Officer is Charles J. Fuschillo Jr.

== Programs and services ==
The Alzheimer's Foundation of America's core programs/services include:

- Counseling, information and referrals by licensed clinical social workers via a National Toll-Free Helpline which is open seven days a week
- National Memory Screening Program, which offers free, confidential memory screenings and educational materials at community sites
- Free, daily virtual activity and therapeutic programs
- Care Connection, monthly educational webinars with guest experts for family and professional caregivers
- Support groups for families affected by Alzheimer's disease
- Professional training programs for dementia-care professionals (AFA provides continuing education hours to licensed social workers in all 50 states)
- AFA Teens and AFA on Campus, divisions to educate and engage students—providing opportunities to establish local chapters; and participate in annual college scholarship and video competitions
- The national Educating America Tour which brings information about Alzheimer's-related programs and services to communities across the country.
- An Education and Resource Center which provides a variety of programs and services to individuals living with Alzheimer's disease, family and professional caregivers and the general public
- The Apartment, a full-scale model residence which teaches caregivers how to make a home safer and more dementia-friendly.

== Research and grants ==
AFA provides grant funding to support research toward a cure and/or better treatment for Alzheimer's disease.

AFA also awards grants to its member organizations to support services in local communities.

== Publications ==
The Alzheimer's Foundation of America publishes:

- Alzheimer's TODAY, a free quarterly magazine for caregivers of people with Alzheimer's disease or related illnesses
- An electronic newsletter highlighting relevant news and events related to dementia
- Booklets, brochures and DVDs on care-related topics, such as dementia warning signs, brain health and wellness, communication tips, healthy aging, and wandering prevention.

The Alzheimer's Foundation of America also published a children's book, Dancing With Granddad: An Alzheimer's Story for Children and Their Families as an educational resource that adults can use to talk to a young child about Alzheimer's disease.

== Collaborations ==
The Alzheimer's Foundation of America is a member of Leaders Engaged on Alzheimer's Disease (LEAD), and an Executive Committee Organization of Friends of the National Institute on Aging.
