= Jarett Gandolfo =

American politician (born 1990)

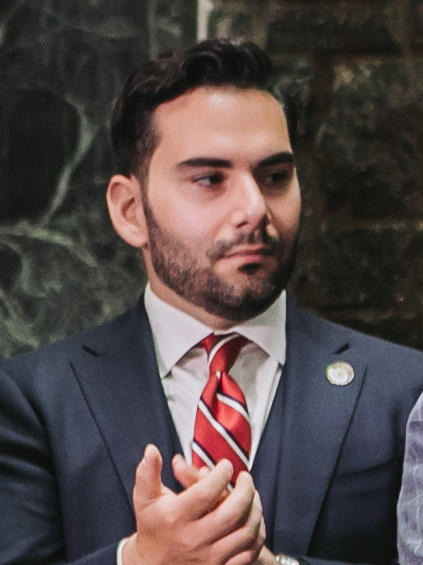
- Gandolfo in 2023

Assistant Minority Leader Pro Tempore of the New York State Assembly

Member of the New York State Assembly from the 7th district
- Incumbent
- Assumed office January 1, 2021
- Preceded by: Andrew Garbarino
- Succeeded by: DawnMarie Kuhn (elect)

Personal details
- Born: June 22, 1990 (age 36)
- Party: Republican
- Education: West Islip High School
- Alma mater: SUNY Albany (BA); Villanova University (MPA)
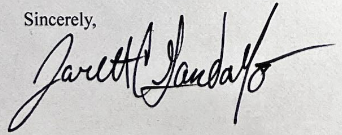
- Signature

Jarett Gandolfo (born June 22, 1990) is an American politician. A Republican, he represents District 7 in the New York State Assembly. Elected in 2020, he assumed office on January 1, 2021.

== Early life and education ==
Gandolfo is of Italian descent. Gandolfo was raised in West Islip, New York and graduated from West Islip High School. He earned a Bachelor of Arts (BA) degree in criminology and sociology from State University of New York at Albany and a Master of Public Administration (MPA) from Villanova University.

== Career ==
Prior to his election to the New York State Assembly, Gandolfo served as Andrew Garbarino's chief of staff. When Garbarino was elected to the United States House of Representatives, Gandolfo announced his candidacy to succeed him. Gandolfo defeated Democratic nominee Francis T. Genco in the November election and assumed office on January 1, 2021.

Once in office, Gandolfo became a vocal critic of Governor Andrew Cuomo's use of COVID-19 pandemic emergency powers, especially the 10pm curfew imposed on restaurants and bars. Gandolfo argued that the curfew was arbitrary, ineffective, and greatly harming the food service industry.

Gandolfo currently sits on the Health, Higher Education, Insurance, Mental Health, and Racing and Wagering committees.

New York State Assembly
Preceded by Andrew Garbarino	Member of the New York Assembly from the 7th District; 2021–present	Incumbent
