= New York Health Act =

Healthcare bill under consideration

New York State Senate
- Long title: An act to amend the public health law and the state finance law, in relation to enacting the "New York health act" and establishing New York Health

Legislative history
- Bill title: S3425
- Introduced by: Richard N. Gottfried
- First reading: 1991

The New York Health Act (NYHA) is a single-payer healthcare bill under consideration by the New York State Senate. While championed by progressives, the legislation has been obstructed by Republican politicians not wanting it to eliminate private insurance, and Democratic politicians not wanting to upset public-sector union leaders who rely on private insurance for recruiting.

== History ==
First introduced by Assemblyman Richard N. Gottfried in 1991, the New York Health Act would establish a single-payer healthcare system within New York State, independent of the federal government's system that relies on private insurance. It first passed the New York State Assembly in 1992. The bill was later passed by the New York State Assembly in 2015, 2016, 2017 and 2018. However, the Republican-controlled New York State Senate refused to give it a hearing.

The Democrats regained control of the State Senate in 2019, but even with control of both New York State Legislature houses could not progress the bill. A large amount of Democratic politicians publicly supported the bill, but were privately against it due to objections from public-sector trade union leaders. Union leaders from the public-sector recognize that single-payer healthcare would eliminate the need for private insurance, which is the primary incentive they offer when recruiting workers. Private-sector unions, including those representing health care workers, are largely in support of single-payer healthcare.

Assemblywoman Amy Paulin took over as sponsor of the bill after the retirement of Richard N. Gottfried in 2022. She introduced changes to the bill in 2023 to assuage concerns from public-sector union leaders of Civil Service Employees Association and District Council 37, assuring them that workers transitioning to a single-payer program would not lose the healthcare benefits they currently have. As of March 2025, the bill is with the New York State Senate's Health Committee, where it is sponsored by state senator Gustavo Rivera.
