= New York's 8th State Senate district =

American legislative district

Senator
Alexis Weik; R–Sayville
- Registration: 38.6% Democratic; 32.7% Republican; 23.6% No party preference
- Demographics: 60% White; 15% Black; 20% Hispanic; 2% Asian
- Population (2017): 313,696
- Registered voters: 238,467

New York's 8th State Senate district is one of 63 districts in the New York State Senate. It has been represented by Republican Alexis Weik since 2023. In 2026, she announced that she would not run for reelection.

== Geography ==
District 8 covers part of the South Shore of Long Island in Nassau County and Suffolk County.

The district overlaps with U.S. congressional districts 2 and 4 and with New York State Assembly districts 9, 10, 11, 14, 17, 18, and 21.

== Recent election results ==
=== 2026 ===
2026 New York State Senate election, District 8
Party	Candidate	Votes	%
Republican	Jarett Gandolfo		
Conservative	Jarett Gandolfo		
Total	Jarett Gandolfo		
Democratic	Joshua Taveras		
Write-in			
Total votes			

=== 2024 ===
2024 New York State Senate election, District 8
Party	Candidate	Votes	%
Republican	Alexis Weik	105,939	
Conservative	Alexis Weik	12,664	
Total	Alexis Weik (incumbent)	118,603	67.2
Democratic	Francis Dolan	57,826	32.8
Write-in		58	0.0
Total votes		176,487	100.0
Republican hold			

=== 2022 ===
2022 New York State Senate election, District 8
Party	Candidate	Votes	%
Republican	Alexis Weik	83,781	
Conservative	Alexis Weik	12,481	
Total	Alexis Weik	96,262	69.3
Democratic	John Alberts	42,707	30.7
Write-in		23	0.0
Total votes		138,992	100.0
Republican win (new boundaries)			

=== 2020 ===
2020 New York State Senate election, District 8
Party	Candidate	Votes	%
Democratic	John Brooks	80,497	
Working Families	John Brooks	7,578	
Independence	John Brooks	4,885	
Total	John Brooks (incumbent)	92,960	99.3
Write-in		621	0.7
Total votes		93,581	100.0
Democratic hold			

=== 2018 ===
2018 New York State Senate election, District 8
Party	Candidate	Votes	%
Democratic	John Brooks	61,784	
Working Families	John Brooks	1,240	
Women's Equality	John Brooks	655	
Total	John Brooks (incumbent)	63,679	54.8
Republican	Jeffrey Pravato	46,719	
Conservative	Jeffrey Pravato	4,831	
Independence	Jeffrey Pravato	764	
Reform	Jeffrey Pravato	174	
Total	Jeffrey Pravato	52,488	45.2
Write-in		38	0.0
Total votes		116,205	100.0
Democratic hold			

=== 2016 ===
2016 New York State Senate election, District 8
Party	Candidate	Votes	%
Democratic	John Brooks	65,277	
Working Families	John Brooks	2,332	
Women's Equality	John Brooks	990	
Total	John Brooks	68,599	50.1
Republican	Michael Venditto	59,500	
Conservative	Michael Venditto	6,617	
Independence	Michael Venditto	1,437	
Tax Revolt Party	Michael Venditto	443	
Reform	Michael Venditto	288	
Total	Michael Venditto (incumbent)	68,285	49.8
Write-in		84	0.1
Total votes		136,968	100.0
Democratic gain from Republican			

=== 2014 ===
2014 New York State Senate election, District 8
Party	Candidate	Votes	%
Republican	Michael Venditto	34,732	
Conservative	Michael Venditto	5,154	
Independence	Michael Venditto	1,719	
Tax Revolt Party	Michael Venditto	276	
Total	Michael Venditto	41,881	59.8
Democratic	David Denenberg	25,679	
Working Families	David Denenberg	1,770	
Women's Equality	David Denenberg	655	
Total	David Denenberg	28,104	40.1
Write-in		77	0.1
Total votes		70,062	100.0
Republican hold			

=== 2012 ===
2012 New York State Senate election, District 8
Party	Candidate	Votes	%
Republican	Charles Fuschillo	57,648	
Conservative	Charles Fuschillo	7,443	
Independence	Charles Fuschillo	3,147	
Tax Revolt Party	Charles Fuschillo	470	
Total	Charles Fuschillo (incumbent)	68,708	59.2
Democratic	Carol Gordon	47,393	40.8
Write-in		20	0.1
Total votes		116,121	100.0
Republican hold			

=== Federal results in District 8 ===
Year	Office	Results
2020	President	Biden 52.1 – 46.5%
2016	President	Clinton 50.0 – 47.2%
2012	President	Obama 55.7 – 43.3%
2012	Senate	Gillibrand 66.1 – 32.9%
