= Joe Crowley =

American politician (born 1962)

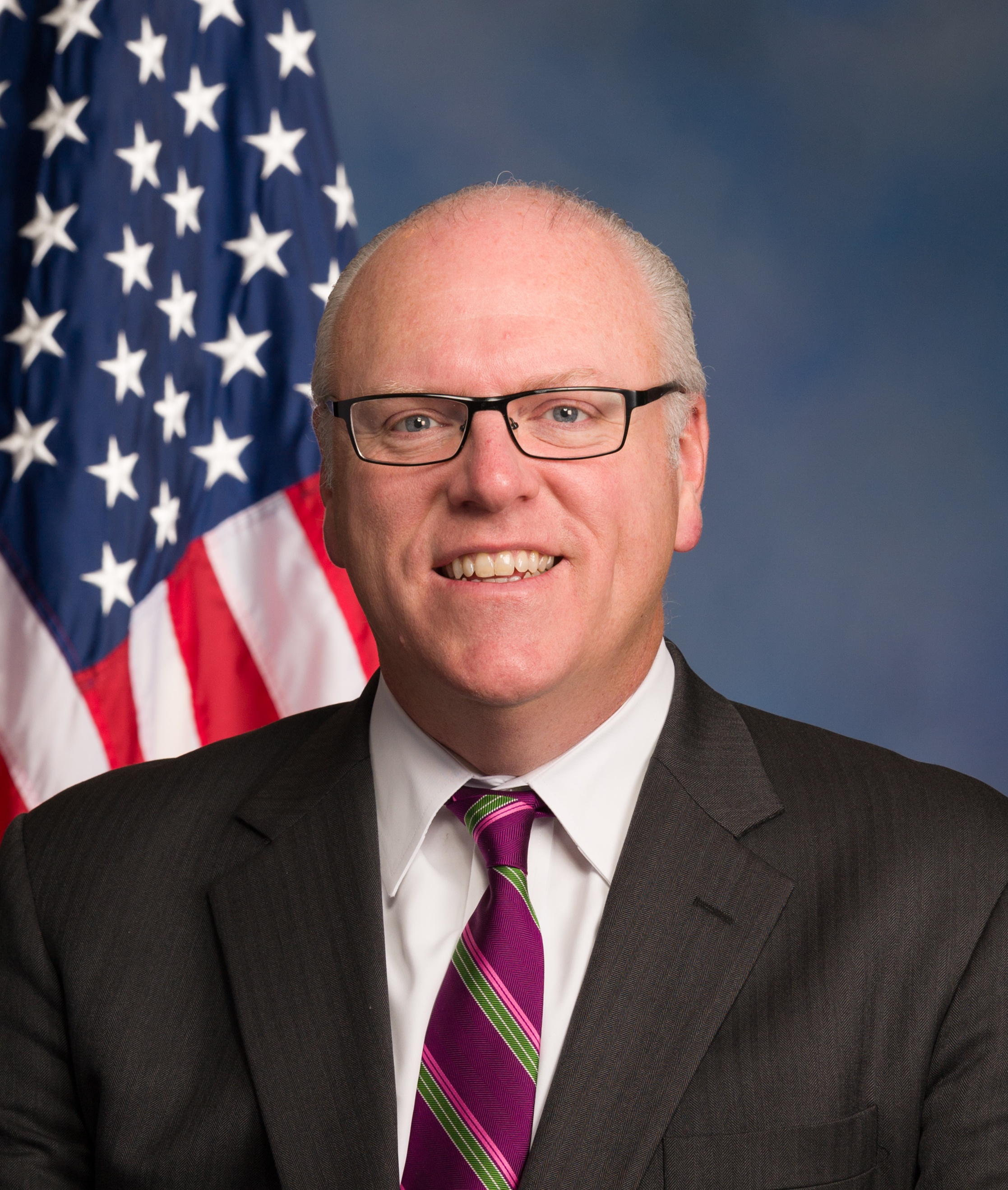
- Official portrait, 2013

Chair of the House Democratic Caucus
- In office January 3, 2017 – January 3, 2019
- Deputy: Linda Sánchez
- Leader: Nancy Pelosi
- Preceded by: Xavier Becerra
- Succeeded by: Hakeem Jeffries

Vice Chair of the House Democratic Caucus
- In office January 3, 2013 – January 3, 2017
- Leader: Nancy Pelosi
- Preceded by: Xavier Becerra
- Succeeded by: Linda Sánchez

Member of the U.S. House of Representatives from New York
- In office January 3, 1999 – January 3, 2019
- Preceded by: Thomas Manton
- Succeeded by: Alexandria Ocasio-Cortez
- Constituency: 7th district (1999–2013); 14th district (2013–2019)

Member of the New York State Assembly from the 30th district
- In office January 1, 1987 – December 31, 1998
- Preceded by: Ralph Goldstein
- Succeeded by: Margaret Markey

Personal details
- Born: March 16, 1962 (age 64) New York City, New York, U.S.
- Party: Democratic
- Spouse: Kasey Nilson (m. 1998)
- Children: 3
- Relatives: Elizabeth Crowley (cousin); Patrick Martinez (nephew)
- Education: Queens College (BA)
- Crowley's voice Crowley on legislation naming Robert Emmet Park. Recorded June 27, 2017

Joseph Crowley (born March 16, 1962) is an American former politician who served as U.S. representative from New York from 1999 to 2019, changing districts once in 2013. He was defeated by Democratic primary challenger Alexandria Ocasio-Cortez in what was viewed as one of the biggest upsets of the 2018 midterm elections.

During his tenure, Crowley served as chair of the House Democratic Caucus from 2017 to 2019, as well as the local chairman of the Queens County Democratic Party from 2006 to 2019. He previously served in the New York State Assembly from 1987 to 1998 and as the U.S. representative for the 7th district from 1999 to 2013, when it was redistricted. After leaving Congress, he joined the Washington, D.C. lobbying and law firm Squire Patton Boggs. He left that firm in 2022 and joined the rival law firm Dentons.

== Early life and education ==
Crowley was born in Woodside, Queens, New York City, to Joseph F. Crowley Sr., an Irish American, and Eileen Crowley, who emigrated from County Armagh, Northern Ireland. Crowley Sr. served in the United States Army during the Korean War, later becoming a lawyer and a New York City Police Department detective. Crowley Jr. is the second of four siblings. Crowley Jr.'s paternal uncle Walter H. Crowley was a New York City councilman, and is the namesake of Crowley Playground in Elmhurst, Queens.

Crowley attended private Roman Catholic schools in the city, graduating from Power Memorial Academy in Manhattan in 1981. He graduated from Queens College in 1985 with a degree in political science and communications. Crowley was inducted into the Power Memorial Academy Hall of Fame in 2011.

== New York State Assembly ==
Crowley was a member of the New York State Assembly from 1987 to 1998, sitting in the 187th, 188th, 189th, 190th, 191st and 192nd New York State Legislatures. Because of his Irish roots, he quickly became involved in Irish-American politics throughout New York.

== U.S. House of Representatives ==
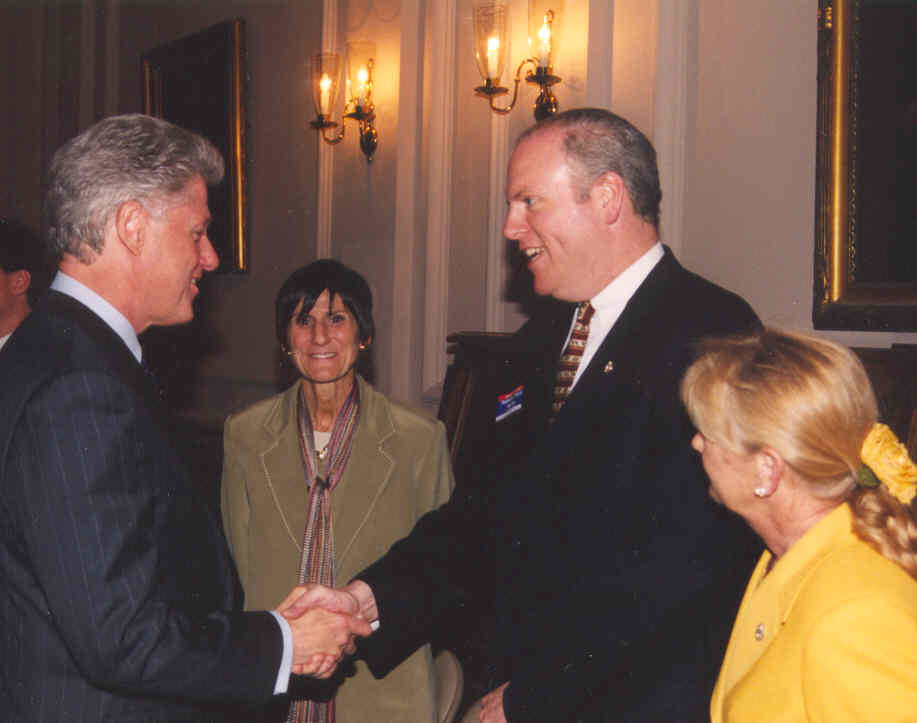
Crowley greeting President Bill Clinton in 1999

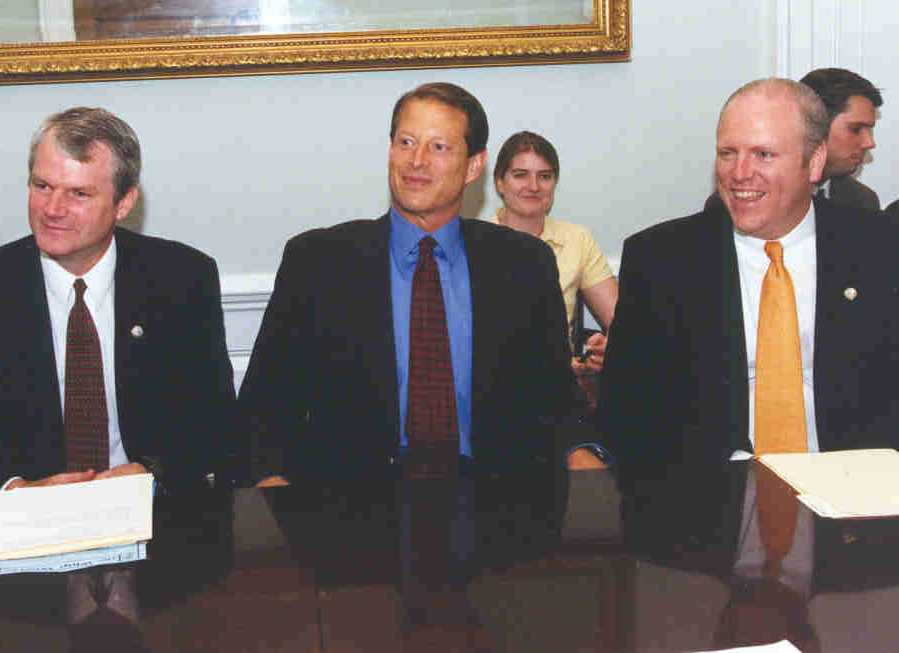
Crowley with Vice President Al Gore in 1999

=== Elections ===
Democratic Congressman Thomas J. Manton announced his retirement from Congress in 1998, having already filed for and circulated petitions for reelection. He withdrew on the last day it was legally possible to do so and arranged for Crowley, his chosen successor, to replace him on the ballot. Crowley was not aware of this until Manton phoned him to tell him his name would be on the general election ballot.

==== 2018 primary election ====
Crowley, who had been named as a potential successor to Nancy Pelosi as House Leader or Speaker, sought re-election in 2018.

Backed by the organization Brand New Congress, Alexandria Ocasio-Cortez challenged Crowley in the Democratic primary. Ocasio-Cortez, who had been an organizer in Bernie Sanders' 2016 presidential campaign, was the first primary challenger Crowley had faced since 2004. Most observers concluded that Crowley would win the primary, citing his strong support from elected officials and his large fundraising advantage.

In her campaign, Ocasio-Cortez said that Crowley was not progressive enough for the district, and also accused him of corruption, stating that he was using his position as chair of the Queens Democratic Party improperly. Crowley significantly outspent Ocasio-Cortez prior to the primary election.

On June 26, 2018, Crowley was defeated in the Democratic primary by Ocasio-Cortez. Ocasio-Cortez received 57% of the vote in what was seen as a massive upset. Crowley remained on the general election ballot under the Working Families Party line. Ocasio-Cortez defeated Crowley and Republican Anthony Pappas in the November 6 general election, with Crowley receiving just under 7% of the vote.

=== Committee assignments ===
- Committee on Ways and Means
  - Subcommittee on Social Security
  - Subcommittee on Select Revenue Measures

=== Caucus memberships ===
- Ad Hoc Committee on Irish Affairs, Co-Chair
- Congressional Musicians Caucus, Founder and Chair
- Bangladesh Caucus, Founder and Chair
- Congressional Caucus on India and Indian-Americans, former co-chair
- Animal Protection Caucus
- Congressional Arts Caucus
- Congressional Historic Preservation Caucus
- Congressional LGBT Equality Caucus
- Congressional Pro-Choice Caucus
- National Service Caucus
- Congressional Asian Pacific American Caucus

=== Tenure ===
Prior to redistricting for the 2012 election, Crowley represented the 7th District, which encompassed portions of Queens and the Bronx. It included neighborhoods such as Woodside, Jackson Heights, East Elmhurst, and College Point, in Queens as well as the neighborhoods of Castle Hill, Co-op City, Parkchester, Throgs Neck, Morris Park, Pelham Parkway, Pelham Bay, Country Club, and City Island in the eastern Bronx.

After 2013, Crowley represented New York's 14th congressional district, which includes the eastern Bronx and part of north-central Queens. The Queens portion includes the neighborhoods of Sunnyside, Astoria, College Point, East Elmhurst, Jackson Heights, Corona and Woodside. The Bronx portion of the district includes the neighborhoods of Morris Park, Parkchester, Pelham Bay, and Throgs Neck as well as City Island.

Crowley served as Democratic Caucus Chairman of the United States House of Representatives, the fourth highest leadership position in the House Democratic Caucus.

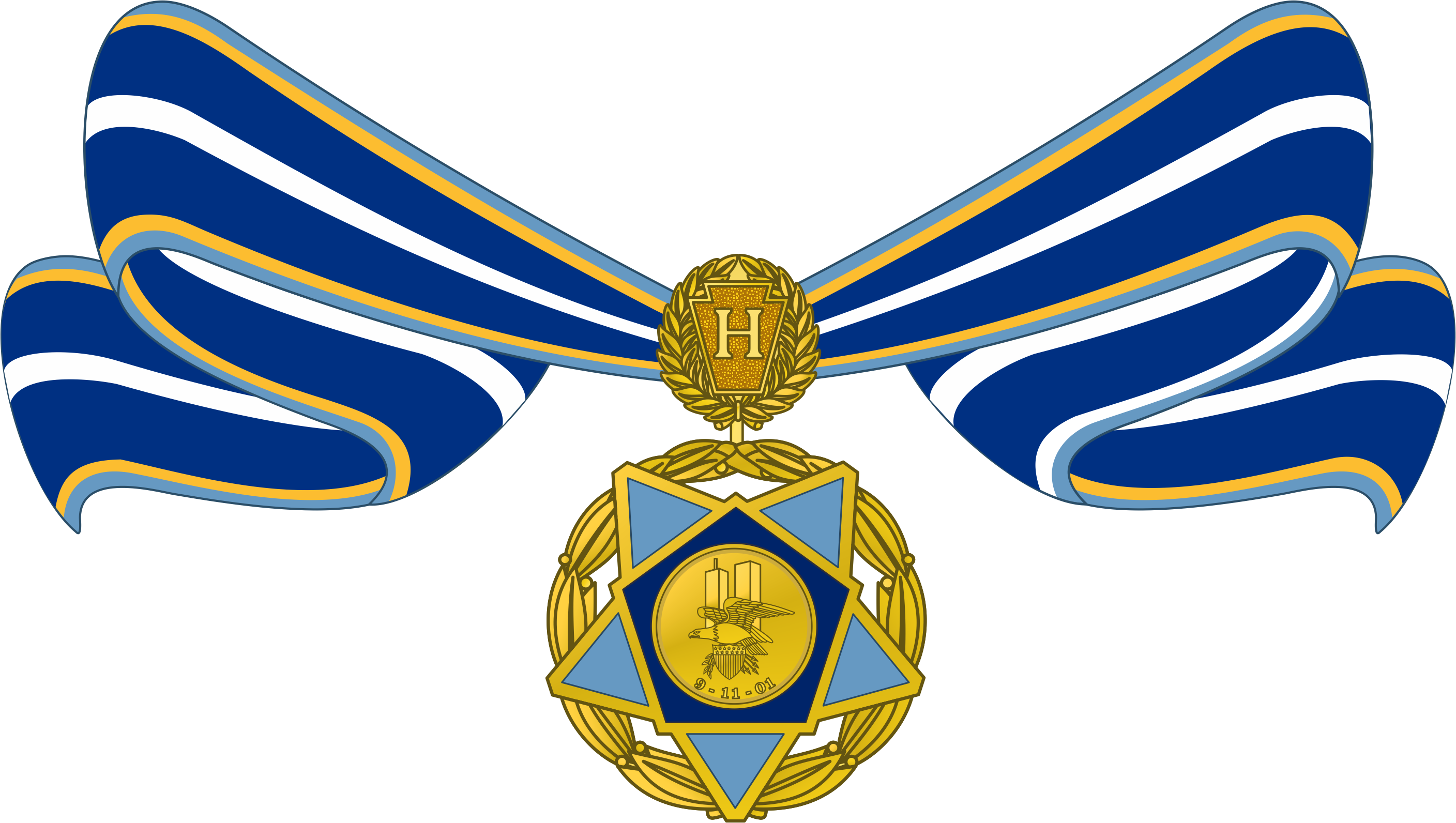
9/11 Heroes Medal of Valor

Crowley's cousin, New York City firefighter John Michael Moran, was killed as a result of the terrorist attacks of September 11, 2001. Crowley authored a bill that provided the 9/11 Heroes Medal of Valor to all emergency workers who died as a result of the terrorist acts. He also created the Urban Area Security Initiative, which directs money to prevent terrorism toward regions that are seen as the most threatened.

Crowley, who has spent much time in India, created a Bangladesh caucus and was formerly the chair of the India Caucus.

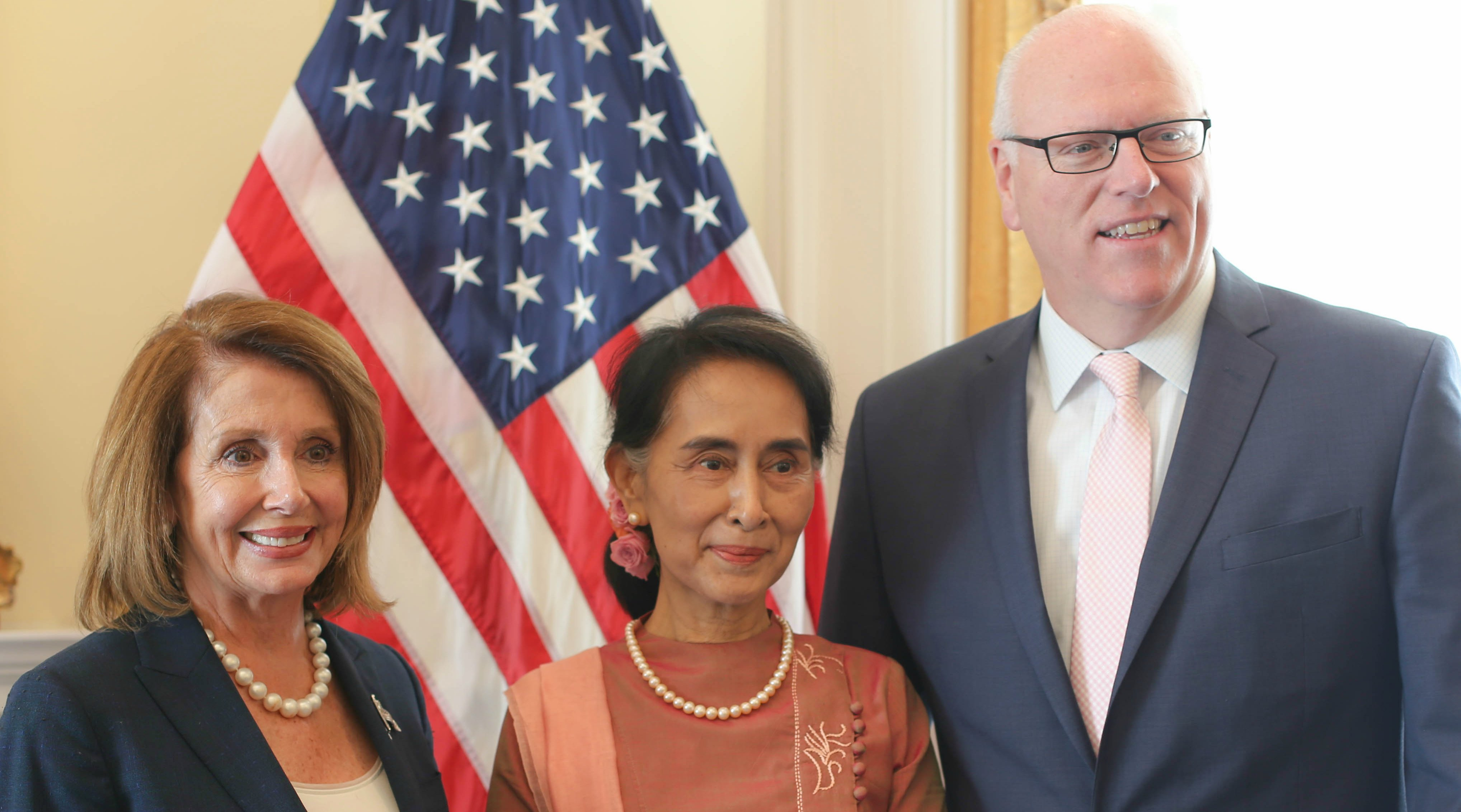
Crowley with Nancy Pelosi and Myanmar's leader Aung San Suu Kyi in September 2016

On October 10, 2002, Crowley was among the 81 House Democrats who voted in favor of authorizing the invasion of Iraq.

Crowley joined Bronx Representative José E. Serrano in 2008 in proposing legislation to help clean up PCB-contaminated schools.

In April 2011, Crowley received media attention for an angry "speech" he gave without actually speaking. Crowley ripped pieces of paper with words to deliver his message.

Crowley was first elected to the U.S. House of Representatives in 1998. The seat was considered open after incumbent Thomas J. Manton retired.

In 2017, Crowley was the commencement speaker at and received an honorary degree from Touro Law Center.

== Political positions ==
=== Health care ===
Crowley fought against the practice of female genital mutilation (FGM), both abroad and in the United States. In 2010, he introduced the Girls Protection Act of 2010, which would criminalize the transport of a girl under the age of 18 years old to undergo FGM.

In 2015, he proposed a bill with Representative Sheila Jackson Lee encouraging the collection of data on the prevalence of FGM, and to create a plan to better prevent the practice, which is illegal in the United States.

Crowley was a consistent supporter of the 2010 Patient Protection and Affordable Care Act (known as "Obamacare", or "ACA"). On March 22, 2010, he said: "I... support the Patient Protection and Affordable Care Act, a historic measure that will put families first when it comes to accessing health care coverage." He opposed repealing the act, and voted against a repeal on January 19, 2011. Also in 2011, he held an event to celebrate the one-year anniversary of the bill's passage.

In 2017, Crowley signed on to H.R. 676, the Expanded and Improved Medicare for All Act. This bill was introduced by former Michigan Congressman John Conyers in January 2017.

=== Immigration ===
Crowley has been a heavy critic of President Trump's plan to build a wall on the U.S.–Mexico border and his decision to end DACA and Temporary Protected Status protection for qualifying immigrants in 2017. In 2017, Crowley introduced a bill that would grant green cards to undocumented workers who helped to recover and clean up New York City after the terrorist attacks on September 11.

=== Economy and budget ===
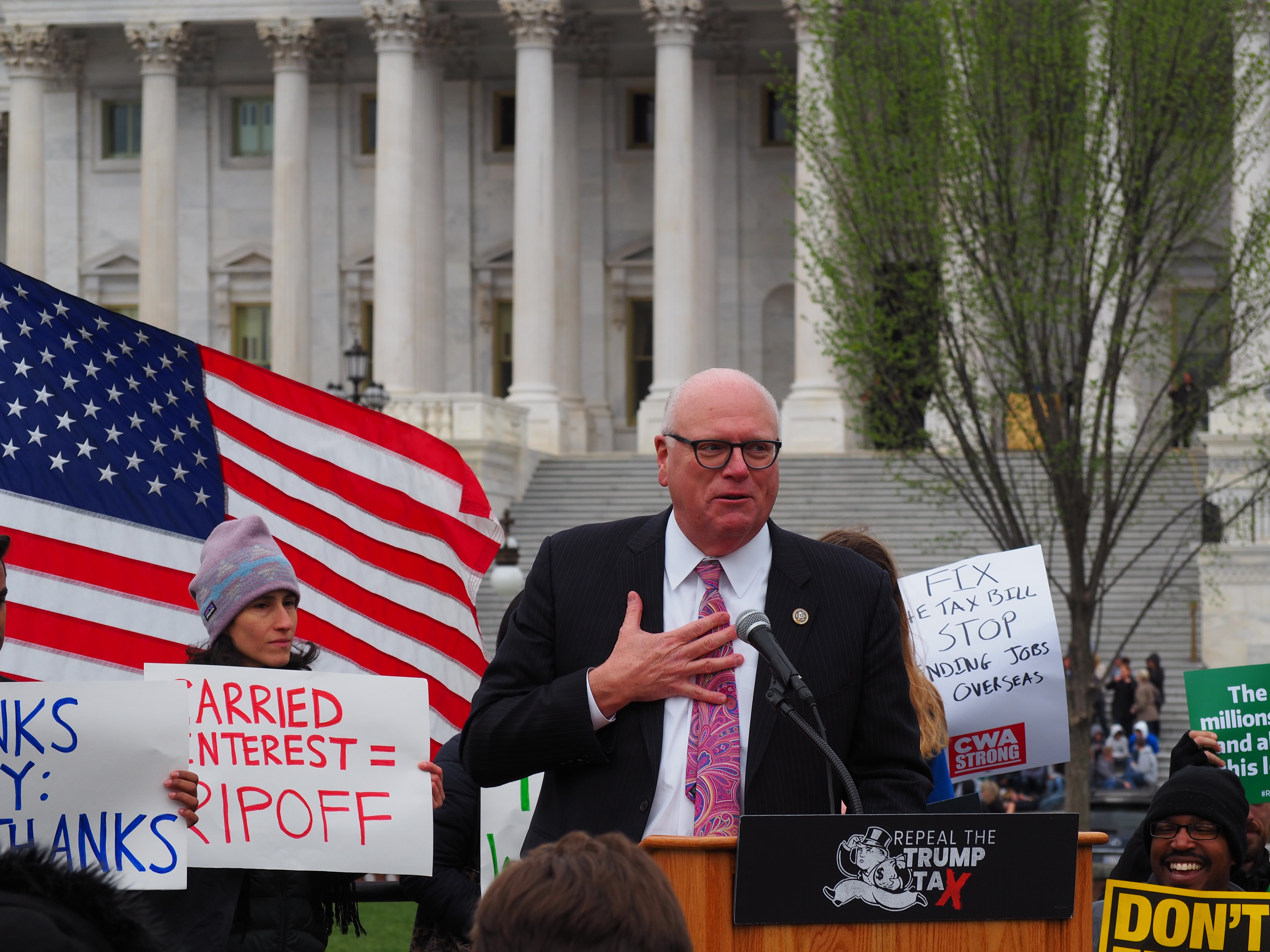
Crowley speaking at the 2018 Tax March

Crowley holds the view "that reducing barriers to investment, creating opportunities for small businesses, and providing equitable working conditions for all Americans can and should be part of our national economic policy". He supported federal spending as a way to increase economic growth. In 2008, he endorsed the Financial Asset Purchase Authority and Tax Law Amendments, which established the Troubled Assets Relief Program (TARP) and allowed the Secretary of the Treasury to buy assets from troubled financial institutions.

Crowley advocated tax increases on the highest tax brackets, tax cuts for the middle class, and reduced defense spending. When serving on the Ways and Means Committee, he stated: "I really don't see how it's justifiable or sensible to give a tax cut to the wealthiest among us, but at the same time increase taxes on U.S. soldiers." He also applauded the 2009 Budget for ending the Alternative Minimum Tax, and ensuring tax cuts for 23 million middle-class Americans. In 2011, he opposed a bill that appropriated funds to the defense budget.

In 2017, Crowley opposed the Tax Cuts and Jobs Act of 2017, saying its only goal was to give more tax cuts to America's top 1% than the working class. In December 2017, Crowley said in a floor speech: "It's a scam, and the American people know it. Is this a bill that helps people who are living paycheck to paycheck? Hell, no."

=== Other positions ===
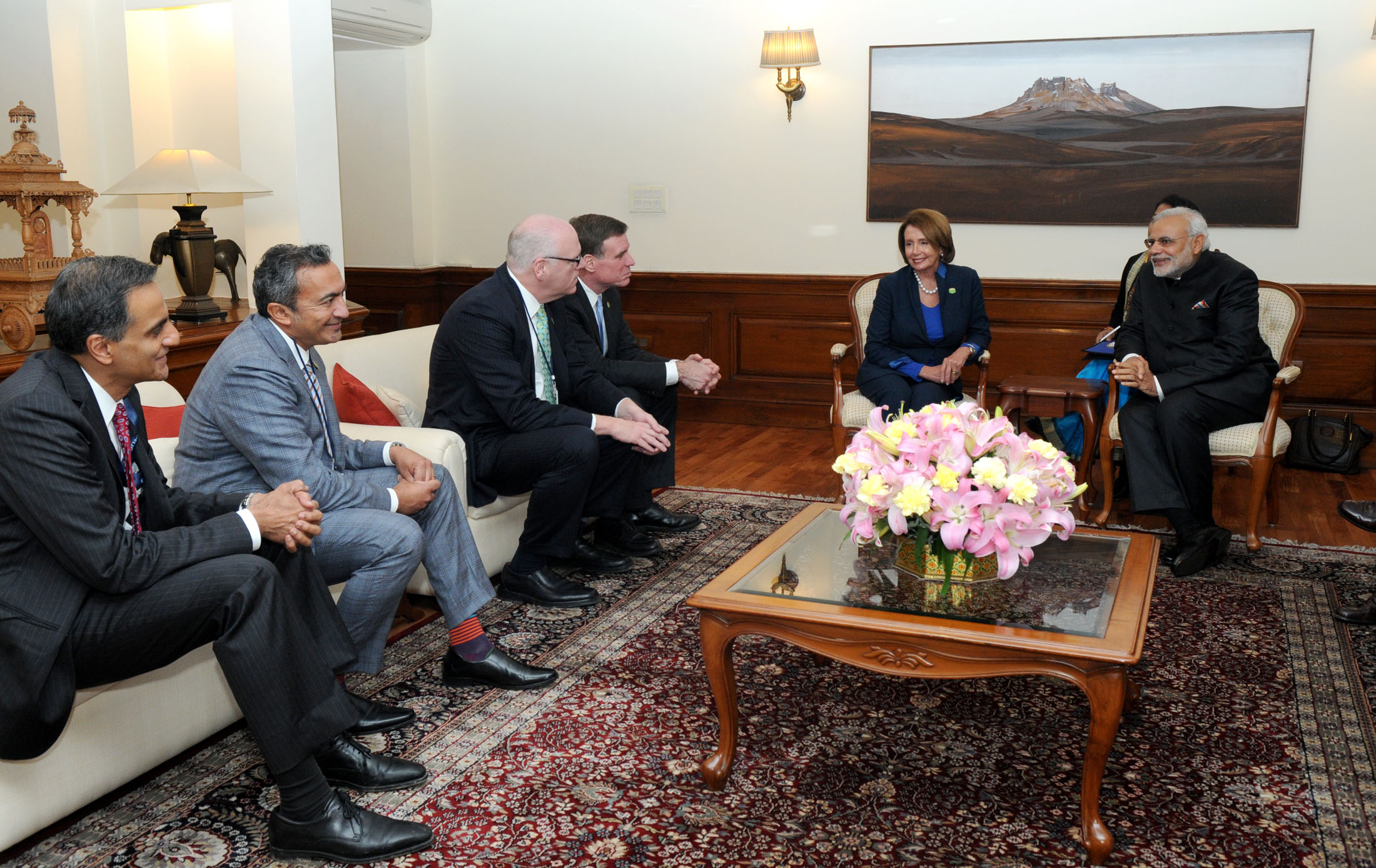
Crowley, Nancy Pelosi, and Mark Warner meeting with Indian Prime Minister Narendra Modi, New Delhi, January 26, 2015

Crowley proposed legislation to improve conditions for renters in his district. In September 2017, he introduced the Rent Relief Act, which would give refundable tax credits to renters.

Crowley's Irish roots influenced his policy decisions in Congress as a member of the Friends of Ireland Caucus. He worked on peace efforts for the conflict in Northern Ireland and securing refuge for those affected by it. Crowley spoke out against President Trump's effort to eliminate the position of United States Special Envoy for Northern Ireland. Trump eventually reversed this decision. Crowley was named "Irish-American of the year" by the Irish Echo in 2018.

Crowley voted in favor of the Authorization for Use of Military Force Against Iraq Resolution of 2002.

In January 2017, Crowley voted for a House resolution condemning the UN Security Council Resolution 2334, which called Israeli settlement building in the occupied Palestinian territories a flagrant violation of international law and a major obstacle to peace.

== Career after Congress ==
After leaving Congress in 2019, Crowley joined the Washington, D. C. lobbying and law firm Squire Patton Boggs.

In February 2019, Crowley resigned as chair of the Queens Democratic Party.

In May 2019, Crowley joined the board of Northern Swan Holdings Inc., an investment firm focused on hemp and marijuana cultivation in Colombia, along with former Senate Majority Leader Tom Daschle.

Crowley was named a fellow at the Georgetown University Institute of Politics and Public Service. Crowley is a member of the U.S. Semiquincentennial Commission, which is charged with planning and executing the 250th anniversary of the signing of the Declaration of Independence. Crowley is an honorary co-chair of the Pass USMCA Coalition, an umbrella organization working to pass USMCA, the Trump administration's replacement for the North American Free Trade Agreement.

In 2022, Crowley left Squire Patton Boggs to move to the Dentons Law Firm, also based in Washington, D.C.

== Personal life ==
Crowley is married to Kasey Crowley, a registered nurse. They have three children: Cullen, Kenzie, and Liam. He is the cousin of former New York City Councilwoman Elizabeth Crowley.

Joe Crowley has a brother-in-law named Ramon Martinez, who was a chief of staff at the New York City Council. Joe Crowley also has a nephew named Patrick Martinez.

Crowley sat on the board of directors of All Hallows High School in the Bronx, New York.

== Electoral history ==
US House election, 2012: New York District 14
| Party | Candidate | Votes | % |
|---|---|---|---|
| Democratic | Joe Crowley | 116,117 | |
| Working Families | Joe Crowley | 4,644 | |
| Total | Joe Crowley (incumbent) | 120,761 | 83.2 |
| Republican | William Gibbons | 19,191 | |
| Conservative | William Gibbons | 2,564 | |
| Total | William Gibbons | 21,755 | 15.0 |
| Green | Anthony Gronowicz | 2,570 | 1.8 |
| None | Blank/Void/Scattered | 25,915 | |
| Total votes | | 145,086 | 100.00 |
| Democratic hold | | | |

US House election, 2014: New York District 14
| Party | Candidate | Votes | % |
|---|---|---|---|
| Democratic | Joe Crowley | 45,370 | 67.34 |
| Working Families | Joe Crowley | 4,982 | 7.39 |
| Total | Joe Crowley (incumbent) | 50,352 | 74.74 |
| Conservative | Elizabeth Perri | 6,735 | 10.00 |
| None | Blank/Void/Write-In | 10,285 | 15.27 |
| Total votes | | 67,372 | 100 |
| Democratic hold | | | |

U.S. House election, 2016: New York District 14
| Party | Candidate | Votes | % |
|---|---|---|---|
| Democratic | Joe Crowley | 138,367 | 70.13% |
| Working Families | Joe Crowley | 7,317 | 3.71% |
| Women's Equality | Joe Crowley | 1,903 | 0.96% |
| Total | Joe Crowley (incumbent) | 147,587 | 74.80% |
| Republican | Frank J. Spotorno | 26,891 | 13.63% |
| Conservative | Frank J. Spotorno | 3,654 | 1.85% |
| Total | Frank J. Spotorno | 30,545 | 15.48% |
| None | Blank/Void/Scattering | 19,169 | 9.72% |
| Total votes | | 197,301 | 100.00% |
| Democratic hold | | | |

Democratic primary results
| Party | Candidate | Votes | % |
|---|---|---|---|
| Democratic | Alexandria Ocasio-Cortez | 16,898 | 56.7 |
| Democratic | Joseph Crowley (incumbent) | 12,880 | 43.3 |
| Total votes | | 29,778 | 100.0 |

New York's 14th congressional district, 2018
| Party | Candidate | Votes | % |
|---|---|---|---|
| Democratic | Alexandria Ocasio-Cortez | 110,318 | 78.2 |
| Republican | Anthony Pappas | 19,202 | 13.6 |
| Working Families | Joseph Crowley | 8,075 | 5.7 |
| Women's Equality | Joseph Crowley | 1,273 | 0.9 |
| Total | Joseph Crowley (incumbent) | 9,348 | 6.6 |
| Conservative | Elizabeth Perri | 2,254 | 1.6 |
| Total votes | | 141,122 | 100.0 |
| Democratic hold | | | |

== See also ==
- 1998 New York's 7th congressional district election
- 2000 New York's 7th congressional district election
- 2002 New York's 7th congressional district election
- 2004 New York's 7th congressional district election
- 2006 New York's 7th congressional district election
- 2008 New York's 7th congressional district election
- 2010 New York's 7th congressional district election
- 2012 New York's 14th congressional district election
- 2014 New York's 14th congressional district election
- 2016 New York's 14th congressional district election
- 2018 New York's 14th congressional district election
- List of Queens College people

U.S. House of Representatives
| Preceded by Thomas J. Manton | Member of the U.S. House of Representatives from New York's 7th congressional district 1999–2013 | Succeeded by Nydia Velázquez |
| Preceded by Carolyn Maloney | Member of the U.S. House of Representatives from New York's 14th congressional district 2013–2019 | Succeeded by Alexandria Ocasio-Cortez |
Party political offices
| Preceded by Ellen Tauscher | Chair of the New Democrat Coalition; 2009–2013 | Succeeded by Ron Kind |
| Preceded by Xavier Becerra | Vice Chair of the House Democratic Conference; 2013–2017 | Succeeded by Linda Sánchez |
| Preceded by Xavier Becerra | Chair of the House Democratic Conference; 2017–2019 | Succeeded by Hakeem Jeffries |
U.S. order of precedence (ceremonial)
| Preceded by James T. Walsh as Former U.S. Representative | Order of precedence of the United States as Former U.S. Representative | Succeeded by Stephen L. Neal as Former U.S. Representative |
