= Patrick Martinez (politician) =

American politician

Member-elect of the New York State Assembly from the 30th district
- Assuming office January 1, 2027
- Succeeding: Steven Raga

Personal details
- Born: Queens, New York, U.S.
- Party: Democratic
- Relatives: Joseph Crowley (uncle); Elizabeth Crowley (cousin)
- Education: Middlebury College (BS); Baruch College (MBA)

Patrick Martinez is an American politician. A member of the Democratic Party, he is a member-elect of the New York State Assembly for the 30th district.

Martinez is the son of longtime New York City Council staffer Ramón Martinez, as well as the nephew of former U.S. representative Joseph Crowley and cousin of New York City Councilmember Elizabeth Crowley.

== Early life and career ==
Martinez was born and raised in Elmhurst, Queens. He is the son of longtime New York City Council staffer Ramón Martinez, a native of Cuba who grew up in Queens and served as chief of staff to council speakers Christine Quinn and Melissa Mark-Viverito. He is also the nephew of former U.S. representative and Queens Democratic Party boss Joseph Crowley, who was defeated for re-election by Alexandria Ocasio-Cortez in the 2018 Democratic primary election, and the cousin of former New York City Councilmember Elizabeth Crowley. Martinez's brother, Connor, was an intergovernmental affairs aide to former mayor Eric Adams.

Martinez graduated from Stuyvesant High School then earned a Bachelor of Science in international studies from Middlebury College in 2009 and an MBA from the Zicklin School of Business at Baruch College in 2020. He has worked in digital marketing at tech startups and nonprofits including Coalition for Queens.

== Political career ==
In April 2022, Martinez was appointed to Queens Community Board 2 by borough president Donovan Richards. He was voted the board's parliamentarian in December 2024 and re-appointed to the board by Richards in April 2026. He is a co-founder of the Queens Forward Democratic Club.

=== New York State Assembly campaign ===
Martinez announced his campaign for the New York State Assembly in the 2026 election in February 2026, entering the race with the Queens Democratic Party's endorsement. By March, Martinez was reported to have raised $27,000 in campaign funds and have about the same amount in cash on hand, lagging behind former NYPD detective Shamsul Haque's $117,000 in donations and ahead of Nepalese American organizer Somnath Ghimire's $26,000 in donations and $17,000 cash on hand. He cited housing affordability, sustainable urban development and community inclusion as top campaign issues and advocated for expanding high-density housing and increased funding for Mitchell-Lama housing.

Primary election night results on June 23, 2026, showed a tight race with Martinez leading Haque by 13 votes, which then came down to 2 votes by July 2. After a manual recount, Martinez was declared the winner by 7 votes over Haque on July 15.
