= Margaret Markey =

American politician (1941–2025)

Member of the New York State Assembly from the 30th district
- In office January 3, 1999 – December 31, 2016
- Preceded by: Joe Crowley
- Succeeded by: Brian Barnwell

Personal details
- Born: Margaret Mary Nickel; November 4, 1941 New York City, U.S.
- Died: September 24, 2025 (aged 83) New York City, U.S.
- Party: Democratic
- Spouse: Charles Markey (m. 1964)
- Children: 3
- Profession: Politician
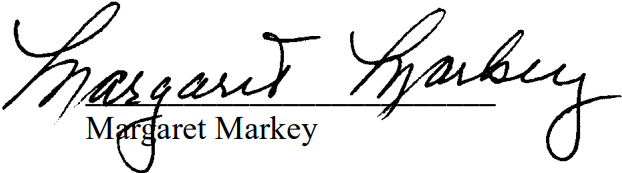
- Signature
- Website: Official website at the Wayback Machine (archived March 4, 2016)

Margaret Mary Markey (née Nickel; November 4, 1941 – September 24, 2025) was an American politician who represented District 30 in the New York State Assembly, which is made up of Maspeth and Woodside, as well as portions of Middle Village, Astoria, Sunnyside and Long Island City. She was a Democrat.

== Early life and career ==
Markey was born in Queens, New York on November 4, 1941. A graduate of Berkeley Business School, Markey began in public service as the assistant director of economic development for former Queens Borough President Claire Shulman, later becoming the borough's director of marketing and tourism. She was first elected to the New York State Assembly in 1998. In 2016 she was chairwoman of the Assembly's Committee on Tourism, Parks, Arts and Sports Development. She was a president of the American-Irish Legislators Society of New York.

In 2009, a controversial bill presented by Markey sought to extend the statute of limitations in civil sex abuse cases. Critics, including the Catholic Church, argued that the legislation was unfair because it targeted only private institutions and their employees. The final version of the legislation, which was passed, included public employees and their employers.

In March 2010, Markey co-sponsored, along with assembly members N. Nick Perry and Félix Ortiz, a bill that would prohibit the use of all forms of salt in the preparation and cooking of all restaurant food, with customers having the option to add salt once served.

Markey lost re-election to the Assembly in 2016, defeated in the Democratic primary for District 30 to Woodside attorney Brian Barnwell, aged 30. Markey saw her political fortunes change for the worse when she failed to show up at community events and protests in relation to a proposed homeless shelter in the neighborhood of Maspeth.

== Personal life and death ==
Markey resided in Maspeth with her husband, State Supreme Court Judge Charles Markey, whom she married in 1964. They had three children: Charles, John, and Margaret. She died from complications of Alzheimer's disease in Queens, on September 24, 2025, at the age of 83.

New York State Assembly
Preceded by Joseph Crowley	New York State Assembly, 30th District; 1999–2016	Succeeded by Brian Barnwell
