= Steven Raga =

American politician

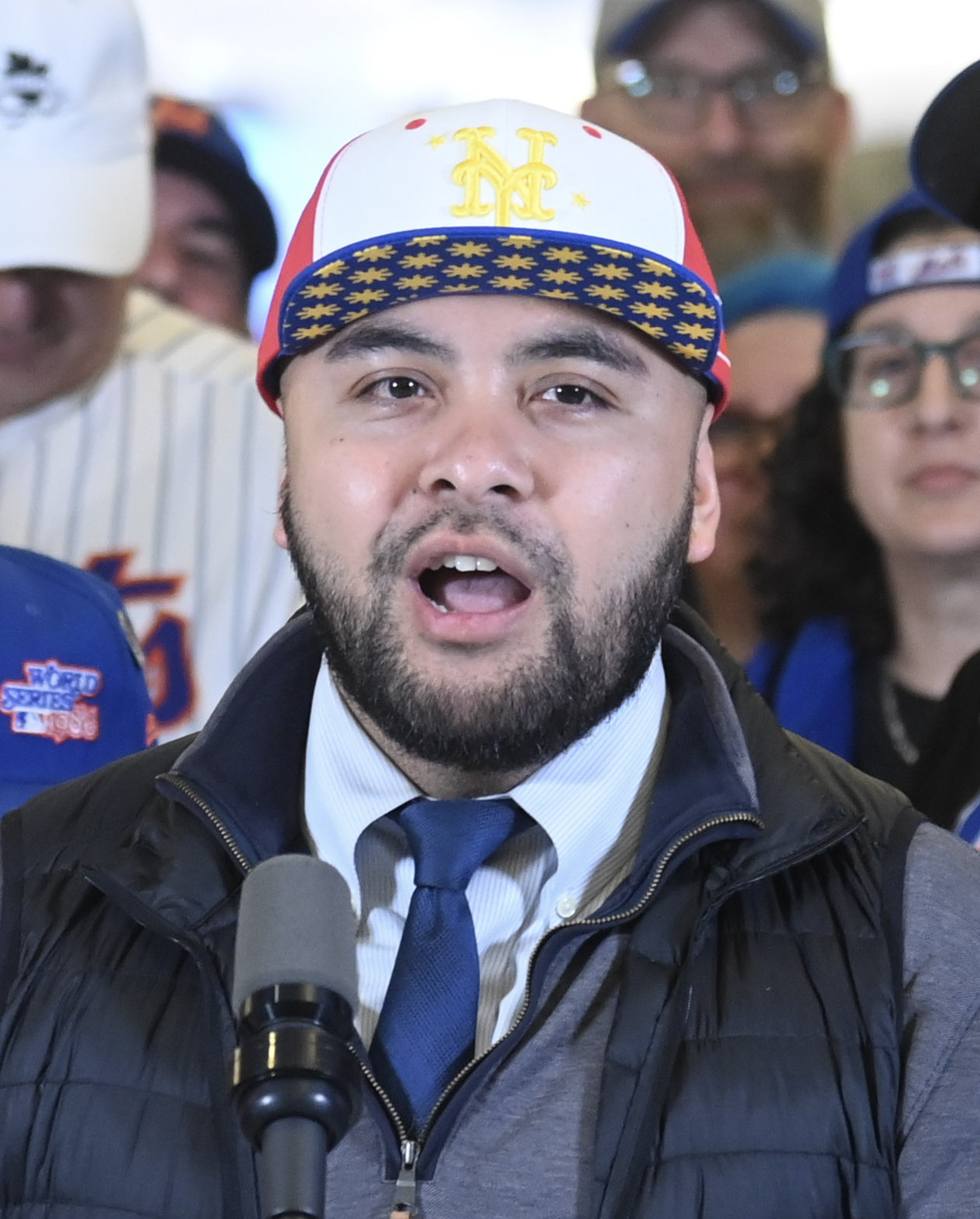

Member of the New York State Assembly from the 30th district
- Incumbent
- Assumed office January 1, 2023
- Preceded by: Brian Barnwell

Personal details
- Born: Queens, New York, U.S.
- Party: Democratic
- Education: Stony Brook University (BA, MPP); Cornell University (MS, MBA); Baruch College (MPA)
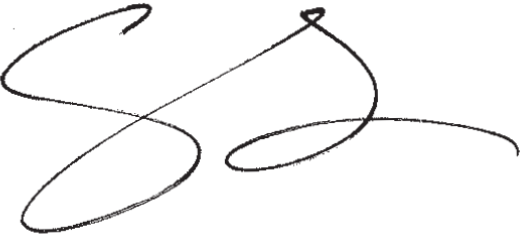
- Signature
- Website: Campaign website State Assembly website

Steven Raga is an American politician serving as a member of the New York State Assembly for the 30th district. A Democrat, Raga was first elected to the Assembly in November 2022. Assembly District 30 encompasses parts of Woodside, Jackson Heights, Elmhurst and Maspeth in the New York City borough of Queens. Raga is the first Filipino American to be elected to the New York State Legislature.

== Early life and education ==
Raga was born and in the borough of Queens in New York City, and raised there and in Laguna province, south of Manila. He grew up in Woodside and was raised by a single immigrant mother, who was evicted multiple times, after his father died of an illness the family could not afford to treat. He earned a Bachelor of Arts in political science and Master of Public Policy from Stony Brook University, a Master of Business Administration from the Samuel Curtis Johnson Graduate School of Management at Cornell University, a Master of Science in healthcare management from the Weill Cornell Graduate School of Medical Sciences, and a Master of Public Administration from Baruch College.

== Early career ==
In 2009, Raga founded Filipino American Unity for Progress. He worked as a senior strategist for AARP, served as chief of staff for Assemblymember Brian Barnwell for four years and was the northeast regional manager of Susan G. Komen for the Cure. Raga has also served as executive director of Woodside on the Move.

In 2021, Raga ran for the New York City Council in the 26th district. He was defeated in the Democratic primary election with 3.2% of the vote.

== New York State Assembly ==
Raga is a Democrat. In 2022, he ran for New York State Assembly in District 30. He was first elected to the Assembly on November 8, 2022, defeating Republican Sean Lally. Raga is the first Filipino American to be elected to the New York State Legislature. He was re-elected in 2024.

Assembly District 30 includes portions of Woodside, Jackson Heights, Elmhurst and Maspeth in the New York City borough of Queens.

Raga proposed New York State legislation for the State of New York to install 150 speed cameras to catch drivers who double park their vehicles in New York City only. Drivers who double park their cars will automatically be fined with the new technology when installed.

Raga introduced a bill that would add caste to the list of types of discrimination prohibited in public accommodations in New York state.

== New York State Senate ==
On Saturday, February 21, 2026, Raga announced he is running for the New York State Senate to replace retiring Senator Michael Gianaris in District 12. The announcement was made on the corner of 46^{th} Street and Queens Boulevard underneath the 7 train subway line.

Raga lost the Democratic primary election in June 2026 to Aber Kawas.
