= New York's 30th State Assembly district =

American legislative district

Assemblymember
| Steven Raga; D–Woodside |
- Registration: 58.3% Democratic; 12.2% Republican; 26.5% No party preference
- Demographics: 42% White; 2% Black; 29% Hispanic; 25% Asian; 0% Native American; 0% Hawaiian/Pacific Islander; 0% Other; 2% Multiracial
- Population (2020): 122,882
- Registered voters: 66,857

New York's 30th State Assembly district is one of the 150 districts in the New York State Assembly in the United States. It has been represented by Democrat Steven Raga since 2023, replacing Brian Barnwell. In 2026, he announced that he would not run for re-election.

== Geography ==
=== 2020s ===
Due to the growing Asian population on Elmhurst, Jackson Heights, and Woodside, the new 30th district was drawn to be an Asian majority district, comprising the neighborhoods of Woodside, Elmhurst, and portions of Maspeth, Astoria, Jackson Heights, and Middle Village.

The district overlaps with New York's 6th, 7th and 14th congressional districts, the 12th, 13th and 15th districts of the New York State Senate, and the 22nd, 25th, 26th and 30th districts of the New York City Council.

=== 2010s ===
District 30 is located in Queens, comprising parts of the neighborhoods of Woodside, Maspeth, Astoria, Dutch Kills, Middle Village, Elmhurst, and Sunnyside.

== Recent election results ==
=== 2026 ===
2026 New York State Assembly election, District 30
Primary election
| Party | Candidate | Votes | % |
|---|---|---|---|
| Democratic | Patrick Martinez | 2,784 | 44.2 |
| Democratic | Shamsul Haque | 2,777 | 44.0 |
| Democratic | Somnath Ghimire | 718 | 11.4 |
| Write-in | | 26 | 0.4 |
| Total votes | | 6,305 | 100.0 |
General election
| Democratic | Patrick Martinez | | |
| Republican | Brandon Castro | | |
| Conservative | Brandon Castro | | |
| Reform | Brandon Castro | | |
| Arts & Culture | Brandon Castro | | |
| Total | Brandon Castro | | |
| Write-in | | | |
| Total votes | | | 100.0 |

=== 2024 ===
2024 New York State Assembly election, District 30
| Party | Candidate | Votes | % |
|---|---|---|---|
| Democratic | Steven Raga | 16,396 | |
| Working Families | Steven Raga | 2,057 | |
| Total | Steven Raga (incumbent) | 18,453 | 60.4 |
| Republican | Brandon Castro | 11,720 | |
| Common Sense | Brandon Castro | 305 | |
| Total | Brandon Castro | 12,025 | 39.3 |
| Write-in | | 94 | 0.4 |
| Total votes | | 30,572 | 100.0 |
| Democratic hold | | | |

=== 2022 ===
2022 New York State Assembly election, District 30
Primary election
| Party | Candidate | Votes | % |
|---|---|---|---|
| Democratic | Steven Raga | 2,717 | 70.7 |
| Democratic | Ramon Cando | 1,100 | 28.7 |
| Write-in | | 24 | 0.6 |
| Total votes | | 3,841 | 100.0 |
General election
| Democratic | Steven Raga | 11,473 | 58.3 |
| Republican | Sean Lally | 7,990 | |
| Medical Freedom | Sean Lally | 179 | |
| Total | Sean Lally | 8,169 | 41.5 |
| Write-in | | 28 | 0.2 |
| Total votes | | 19,670 | 100.0 |
| Democratic hold | | | |

=== 2020 ===
2020 New York State Assembly election, District 30
| Party | Candidate | Votes | % |
|---|---|---|---|
| Democratic | Brian Barnwell (incumbent) | 32,866 | 99.0 |
| Write-in | | 333 | 1.0 |
| Total votes | | 33,199 | 100.0 |
| Democratic hold | | | |

=== 2018 ===
2018 New York State Assembly election, District 30
Primary election
| Party | Candidate | Votes | % |
|---|---|---|---|
| Democratic | Brian Barnwell (incumbent) | 5,675 | 64.1 |
| Democratic | Melissa Sklarz | 3,149 | 35.5 |
| Write-in | | 35 | 0.4 |
| Total votes | | 8,859 | 100.0 |
General election
| Democratic | Brian Barnwell (incumbent) | 21,082 | 75.9 |
| Republican | Eric Butkiewicz | 5,828 | |
| Conservative | Eric Butkiewicz | 661 | |
| Reform | Eric Butkiewicz | 155 | |
| Total | Eric Butkiewicz | 6,644 | 23.9 |
| Write-in | | 53 | 0.2 |
| Total votes | | 27,779 | 100.0 |
| Democratic hold | | | |

=== 2016 ===
2016 New York State Assembly election, District 30
Primary election
| Party | Candidate | Votes | % |
|---|---|---|---|
| Democratic | Brian Barnwell | 1,710 | 61.0 |
| Democratic | Margaret Markey (incumbent) | 1,082 | 38.6 |
| Write-in | | 11 | 0.4 |
| Total votes | | 2,803 | 100.0 |
General election
| Democratic | Brian Barnwell | 24,452 | 67.8 |
| Republican | Anthony Nunziato | 9,757 | |
| Conservative | Anthony Nunziato | 1,198 | |
| Reform | Anthony Nunziato | 587 | |
| Total | Anthony Nunziato | 11,542 | 32.0 |
| Write-in | | 68 | 0.2 |
| Total votes | | 36,062 | 100.0 |
| Democratic hold | | | |

=== 2014 ===
2014 New York State Assembly election, District 30
Primary election
| Party | Candidate | Votes | % |
|---|---|---|---|
| Democratic | Margaret Markey (incumbent) | 2,098 | 75.7 |
| Democratic | Dmytro Fedkowskyj | 665 | 24.0 |
| Write-in | | 8 | 0.3 |
| Total votes | | 2,771 | 100.0 |
General election
| Democratic | Margaret Markey (incumbent) | 9,115 | 98.5 |
| Write-in | | 139 | 1.5 |
| Total votes | | 9,254 | 100.0 |
| Democratic hold | | | |

=== 2012 ===
2012 New York State Assembly election, District 30
| Party | Candidate | Votes | % |
|---|---|---|---|
| Democratic | Margaret Markey (incumbent) | 19,619 | 68.3 |
| Republican | Anthony Nunziato | 7,959 | |
| Conservative | Anthony Nunziato | 1,118 | |
| Total | Anthony Nunziato | 9,077 | 31.6 |
| Write-in | | 8 | 0.0 |
| Total votes | | 28,704 | 100.0 |
| Democratic win (new boundaries) | | | |

=== 2010 ===
2010 New York State Assembly election, District 30
| Party | Candidate | Votes | % |
|---|---|---|---|
| Democratic | Margaret Markey (incumbent) | 9,745 | 60.9 |
| Republican | Anthony Nunziato | 5,029 | |
| Conservative | Anthony Nunziato | 768 | |
| Independence | Anthony Nunziato | 439 | |
| Total | Anthony Nunziato | 6,236 | 39.0 |
| Write-in | | 19 | 0.1 |
| Total votes | | 16,000 | 100.0 |
| Democratic hold | | | |

=== 2008 ===
2008 New York State Assembly election, District 30
| Party | Candidate | Votes | % |
|---|---|---|---|
| Democratic | Margaret Markey (incumbent) | 18,118 | 67.8 |
| Republican | Anthony Nunziato | 7,305 | |
| Conservative | Anthony Nunziato | 673 | |
| Independence | Anthony Nunziato | 643 | |
| Total | Anthony Nunziato | 8,621 | 32.2 |
| Total votes | | 26,739 | 100.0 |
| Democratic hold | | | |

=== 2006 ===
2006 New York State Assembly election, District 30
| Party | Candidate | Votes | % |
|---|---|---|---|
| Democratic | Margaret Markey (incumbent) | 10,504 | 100.0 |
| Write-in | | 5 | 0.0 |
| Total votes | | 10,509 | 100.0 |
| Democratic hold | | | |

=== 2004 ===
2004 New York State Assembly election, District 30
| Party | Candidate | Votes | % |
|---|---|---|---|
| Democratic | Margaret Markey (incumbent) | 18,211 | 100.0 |
| Write-in | | 1 | 0.0 |
| Total votes | | 18,212 | 100.0 |
| Democratic hold | | | |

=== 2002 ===
2002 New York State Assembly election, District 30
| Party | Candidate | Votes | % |
|---|---|---|---|
| Democratic | Margaret Markey (incumbent) | 8,218 | 99.9 |
| Write-in | | 5 | 0.1 |
| Total votes | | 8,223 | 100.0 |
| Democratic hold | | | |

=== 2000 ===
2000 New York State Assembly election, District 30
| Party | Candidate | Votes | % |
|---|---|---|---|
| Democratic | Margaret Markey | 17,295 | 100.0 |
| Write-in | | 5 | 0.0 |
| Total votes | | 17,300 | 100.0 |
| Democratic hold | | | |

=== Federal results in Assembly District 30 ===
| Year | Office | Results |
|---|---|---|
| 2024 | President | Harris 54.0 - 43.3% |
| 2024 | Senate | Gillibrand 60.2 - 38.5% |
| 2022 | Senate | Schumer 60.2 - 38.8% |
| 2020 | President | Biden 63.8 - 35.0% |
| 2018 | Senate | Gillibrand 74.0 - 25.9% |
| 2016 | President | Clinton 65.9 - 30.6% |
| 2016 | Senate | Schumer 76.5 - 20.6% |
| 2012 | President | Obama 69.1 - 29.3% |
| 2012 | Senate | Gillibrand 77.2 - 21.0% |
