= Brian Barnwell =

American lawyer and politician

Member of the New York State Assembly from the 30th district
- In office January 1, 2017 – December 31, 2022
- Preceded by: Margaret Markey
- Succeeded by: Steven Raga

Personal details
- Born: April 24, 1986 (age 40) New York, New York, U.S.
- Party: Democratic
- Education: Arizona State University (BA); Albany Law School (JD)
- Profession: Attorney, politician
- Website: Assembly website

Brian Barnwell during the National Anthem at his Decleration of Independence celebration

Brian Barnwell is an American lawyer and politician, who served as a Democratic member of the New York State Assembly. From January 2017 until December 2022, he represented Assembly District 30 in Queens; the district included Maspeth, Woodside, Middle Village, and portions of Astoria, Sunnyside, Elmhurst, Rego Park and Long Island City.

== Early life, education, and family ==
Born in New York City on April 24, 1986, Brian Barnwell has been a longtime Woodside resident. He comes from a middle-class family of law enforcement officers, nurses and teachers. Barnwell graduated cum laude from Arizona State University with a Bachelor of Arts degree in political science. He went on to earn his J.D. degree from Albany Law School.

During his time in law school, Barnwell worked for the Albany County District Attorney's Office and for the Albany Law School Civil Rights and Disabilities Law Clinic.

== Career ==
After graduating from law school, Barnwell went into private practice and practiced general law. Barnwell then worked as an aide in Queens City Council Member Costa Constantinides’s office. Barnwell first announced in July 2015 that he would seek the District 30 seat in the Assembly; at the time, he was a political newcomer. Incumbent Democratic Assemblymember Margaret Markey had been elected to the seat nine times.

In the September 2016 Democratic primary, Barnwell defeated Markey 1,710 votes to 1,082. One report on the election result stated that "[this] might be one of the biggest political upsets Queens has ever seen." After defeating Republican candidate Tony Nunziato by a large margin in the November 2016 general election, Barnwell took office in January 2017.

In the summer of 2018, Barnwell was named to City & State's "Albany 40 Under 40" He joined other "figures crafting groundbreaking legislation, shaping public opinion and driving the news cycle."

=== New York State Assembly ===
During his time in office, Barnwell introduced legislation that provides tax relief for seniors and the middle class. Barnwell drafted legislation to attempt to reform the affordable housing formula, and proposed bills that would allow for tougher sentencing on violent felons. Barnwell also pushed a bill that would outlaw the sale of puppies by "puppy mills." Barnwell was the primary sponsor on many other pieces of legislation. He worked to create bills that hold the government accountable and promote citizen well-being.

Barnwell was the chair of the Subcommittee on Emerging Workforce within the New York State Assembly. Barnwell also served as a member of the Committee on Aging, the Committee on Banks, the Committee on Children and Families, the Committee on Labor, the Committee on Libraries and Education Technology, the Committee on Real Property Taxation, the Asian Pacific American Task Force, and the Puerto Rican/Hispanic Task Force.

== Electoral history ==
New York State Assembly, District 30 Democratic Primary Election, 2018
Party	Candidate	Votes	%
Democratic	Brian Barnwell	5,675	64.3
Democratic	Melissa Sklarz	3,149	35.7
Total votes		8,824	100.0

New York State Assembly, District 30 General Election, 2018
Party	Candidate	Votes	%
Democratic	Brian Barnwell	21,082	75.9
Republican	Eric Butkiewicz	6,644	23.9
Total votes		27,779	100.0

New York State Assembly, District 30 Democratic Primary Election, 2016
Party	Candidate	Votes	%
Democratic	Brian Barnwell	1,710	61.25
Democratic	Margaret Markey (incumbent)	1,082	38.75
Total votes		2,792	100.0

New York State Assembly, District 30 General Election, 2016
Party	Candidate	Votes	%
Democratic	Brian Barnwell	24,452	67.93
Republican	Anthony P. Nunziato	11,542	32.07
Total votes		35,994	100.0

Political offices
Preceded by Margaret Markey	New York Assembly, 30th District; 2016–2022	Succeeded by Steven Raga
