= Aber Kawas =

American politician (born 1992)

- عبير قواس
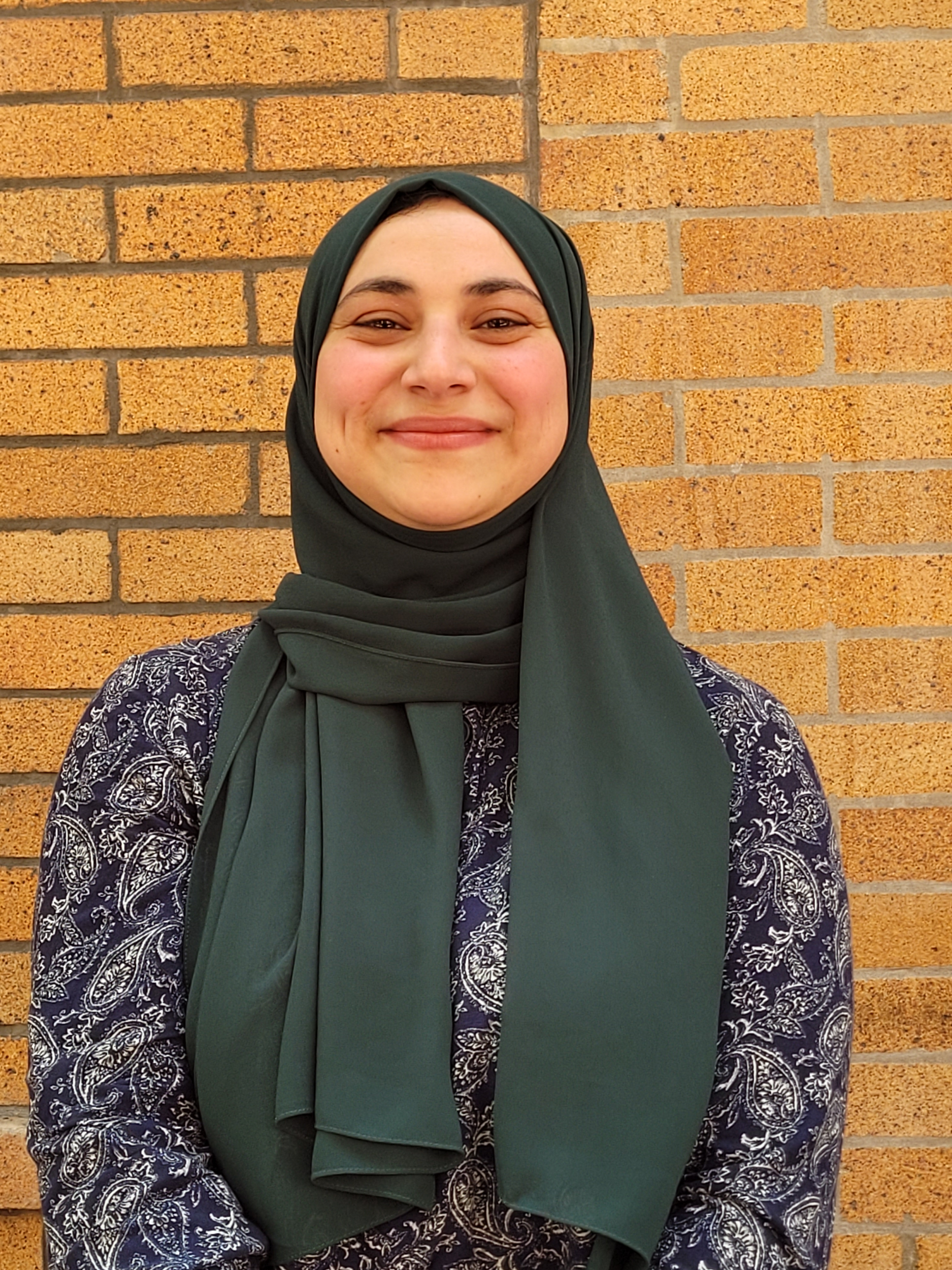
- Kawas in 2026

Member of the New York State Senate from the 12th district
- Incumbent
- Assumed office November 16, 2026
- Preceded by: Michael Gianaris

Personal details
- Born: March 8, 1992 (age 34) Brooklyn, New York, United States
- Party: Democratic
- Other political affiliations: Democratic Socialists of America
- Education: City College of New York; University of Johannesburg
- Website: Campaign website

Aber Kawas (Note: /ˈɑː.bɪɹ kəˈwɑːz/ Arabic: عبير قواس) (born March 8, 1992) is a Palestinian-American democratic socialist politician and community organizer. She is the New York State Senator for the 12th district in Queens. She won the November 3, 2026, general election, becoming the first Palestinian-American elected to the New York State Legislature.

== Biography ==
=== Background ===
Kawas was born and raised in Brooklyn, New York City, to undocumented parents from Palestine. When Kawas was in the 7th grade, Kawas' father, Jordanian national Abdelkareem Kawas, was taken by the U.S. Immigration and Customs Enforcement. The New York Post reported in June 2026 that he had entered the US in 1998 and overstayed his visitor visa before being deported due to two felony convictions. Kawas as a teenager "was spending every weekend taking three-hour rides to a detention center" to visit her father, which moved her to start organizing to support the DREAM Act for comprehensive immigration reform.

=== Education ===
Kawas graduated from the City College of New York with a degree in international studies concentrating on Latin American studies in 2014. In 2011, she learned that her college crush had been an informant for the NYPD, spying on Muslim students. This revelation sparked Kawas's interest in advocacy work for civil rights.

Kawas earned a master’s degree in Islamic Liberation Theology from the University of Johannesburg in South Africa and returned to New York City in 2024.

=== Personal life ===
Kawas moved to Queens in 2024. She is Muslim.

== Career ==
=== Activism ===
Kawas was an advocacy director at the Arab American Association of New York, and has worked with the Council on American–Islamic Relations and Urban Justice Center on issues concerning immigration, racial profiling and police surveillance. In 2016, while at AAANY, she began volunteering for Khader El-Yateem's campaign for New York City Council, which was her first step toward electoral politics.

She was one of the original authors of the "Not On Our Dime" nonprofit regulation bill in the New York State legislature, collaborating with Zohran Mamdani, who had also canvassed for El-Yateem's campaign. As an Assembly member, Mamdani introduced the bill.

=== Politics ===
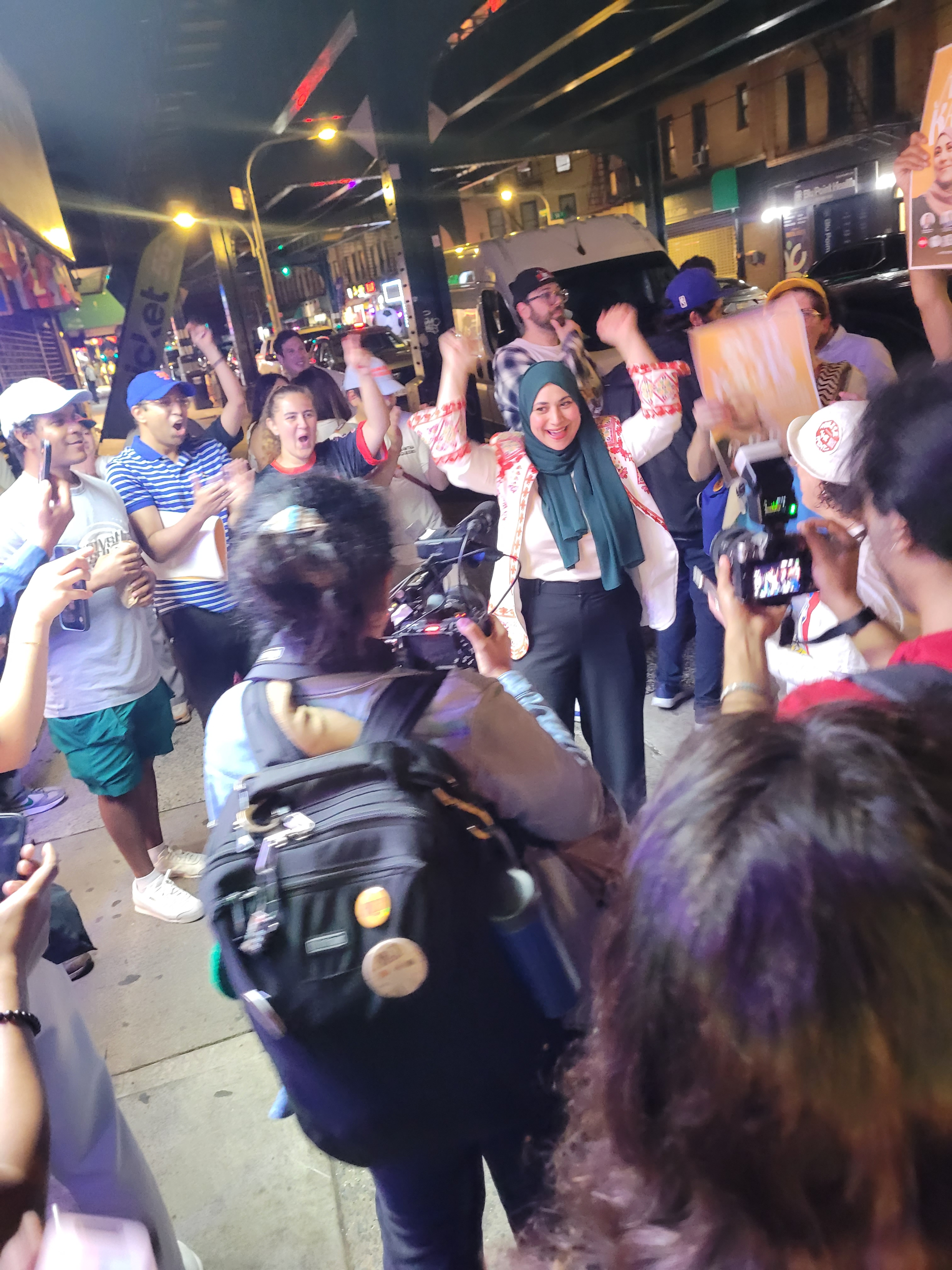
Aber Kawas greets her cheering supporters on June 23rd, 2026 in Woodside, Queens, just after news organizations announced she had won her primary election.

In January 2026, Kawas announced she would run for the New York State Assembly's 34th District to succeed Jessica González-Rojas, who was running for the New York State Senate against incumbent Jessica Ramos. Kawas said she started to think about becoming a candidate after being approached by the NYC-DSA recruitment team. She prioritized three policy areas: "protecting immigrant communities" from ICE, affordability, and "fast and free transit" such as buses.

Kawas received endorsements from Zohran Mamdani, the NYC-DSA, and DRUM Beats, notably besting her primary opponent Brian Romero for NYC-DSA's and DRUM Beats's endorsements. However, when Michael Gianaris announced he would retire from the State Senate, Kawas pivoted her campaign to succeed Gianaris, without changing her policy platform.

In her Senate primary campaign, Kawas ran against another progressive candidate, Assemblymember Steven Raga. She again was endorsed by DRUM Beats, NYC-DSA, and Mamdani, and received endorsements from Councilmembers Chi Ossé and Tiffany Cabán, Jewish Voice for Peace, and Bernie Sanders.

Kawas drew criticism for her 2017 remarks concerning 9/11, in which she had claimed that the tragedy came after "a long trajectory" of "capitalism and racism and White supremacy… and Islamophobia" and "we're just seeing the manifestations of that continuation with 9/11". She said in 2026 that "the right wing" had "cherry-picked" and "twisted" her comments on "9/11 and the consequences to Arab and Muslim communities".

She defeated Raga in the Democratic primary election for State Senate District 12 on June 23, 2026. She will be the Democratic nominee for the district in the general election in November. Her win was characterized as one of several "major victories" for "Muslim progressives" since Mamdani's 2025 election as mayor of New York City.

Kawas travelled to Michigan in the summer of 2026 to campaign for Abdul El-Sayed's candidacy for the US Senate, and Donavan McKinney's campaign for the US House of Representatives, in Michigan's Democratic primary elections.

==== Policy stances ====
Kawas supports renewable energy, advocating for the New York Power Authority to sell "green bonds" to fund the construction of renewable energy projects.

She opposes sending US government funds to the Israeli government, supports abolishing fares for public buses in New York City, supports trans rights and other LGBTQ+ rights, opposes the death penalty, and supports universal healthcare.
