= Michael Gianaris =

American politician (born 1970)

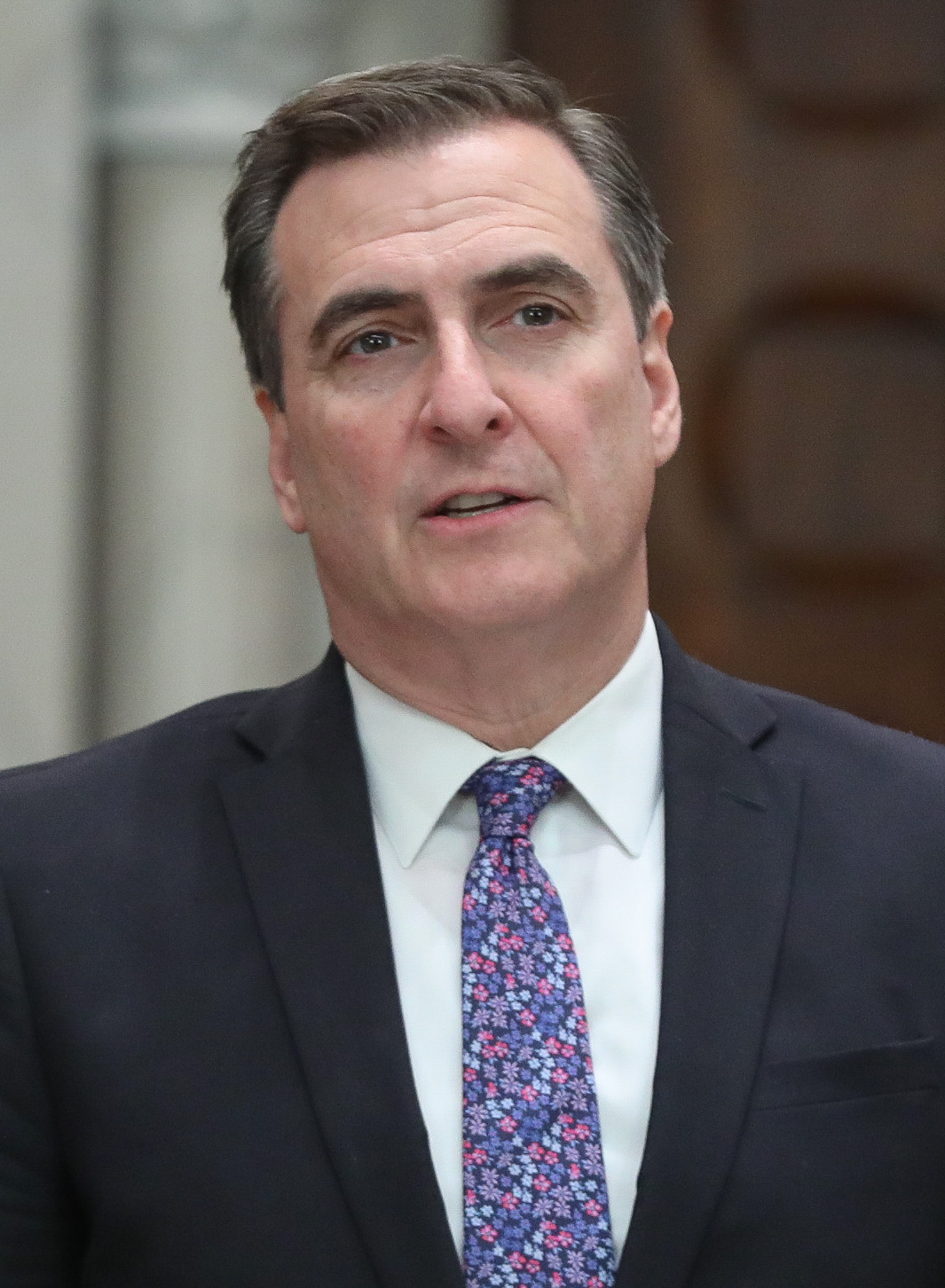
- Gianaris in 2024

Member of the New York State Senate from the 12th district
- In office January 1, 2011 – August 7, 2026
- Preceded by: George Onorato
- Succeeded by: Aber Kawas

Member of the New York State Assembly from the 36th district
- In office January 1, 2001 – December 31, 2010
- Preceded by: Denis J. Butler
- Succeeded by: Aravella Simotas

Personal details
- Born: April 23, 1970 (age 56) Queens, New York, U.S.
- Party: Democratic
- Education: Fordham University (BA); Harvard University (JD)
- Website: Campaign website State Senate website

Michael Gianaris (born April 23, 1970) is an American politician and attorney from Queens, New York. He represented District 36 in the New York State Assembly from 2001 to 2010, and he represented District 12 in the New York State Senate from 2011 to 2026. A member of the Democratic Party, Gianaris was Deputy Majority Leader of the New York State Senate from 2019 to 2026. He currently works as senior vice president of external relations for Metropolitan Park, a casino project led by billionaire Steve Cohen.

== Early life and education ==
Gianaris was born in Astoria and is the son of Greek immigrants Nicholas and Magdalene Gianaris. He graduated from New York City (NYC) public schools P.S. 84, Junior High School 141 and Long Island City High School. He received a B.A. summa cum laude in economics and political science from Fordham University and earned a J.D. degree from Harvard Law School.

== Career ==
Gianaris has served as Associate Counsel to the Committee on Consumer Affairs and Protection, Governmental Operations, Veterans Affairs, and Agriculture and Markets of the Assembly, and also served as an aide to former Queens Congressman Thomas J. Manton, an aide to former governor Mario Cuomo's Queens County Regional Representative, and as a member of Queens Community Planning Board 1 and Legal Counsel to the United Community Civic Association.

=== New York State Assembly ===
In 2000, Gianaris was elected to the New York State Assembly in District 36. He is a Democrat.

In September 2007, he was named one of City Hall's "40 under 40".

=== New York State Senate ===
In 2010, Senator George Onorato decided not to seek re-election, and Gianaris was nominated to replace him. Gianaris won the general election with 81% of the vote.

In 2019, following Senate Democrats' ascent to the majority, Gianaris was named Deputy Majority Leader of the Senate.

Gianaris was principally responsible for scuttling a proposal to locate Amazon's HQ2 in New York City. Gianaris has been noted for his support for antitrust enforcement, having introduced the "21st Century Antitrust Act" in the New York State Legislature and written in support of the federal American Innovation and Choice Online Act proposal.

In February 2026, Gianaris announced he would not run for reelection. Instead, Gianaris resigned early on August 7, 2026, his last date in office being August 10th (after having first said that he would serve till the end of December 2026 to finish his term). There will be a new representative representing the senate district in January 2027.

=== Other campaigns ===
Gianaris ran for Attorney General of New York in 2018, but ended his campaign in May 2018 and endorsed fellow Democrat Letitia James.

== Political positions ==
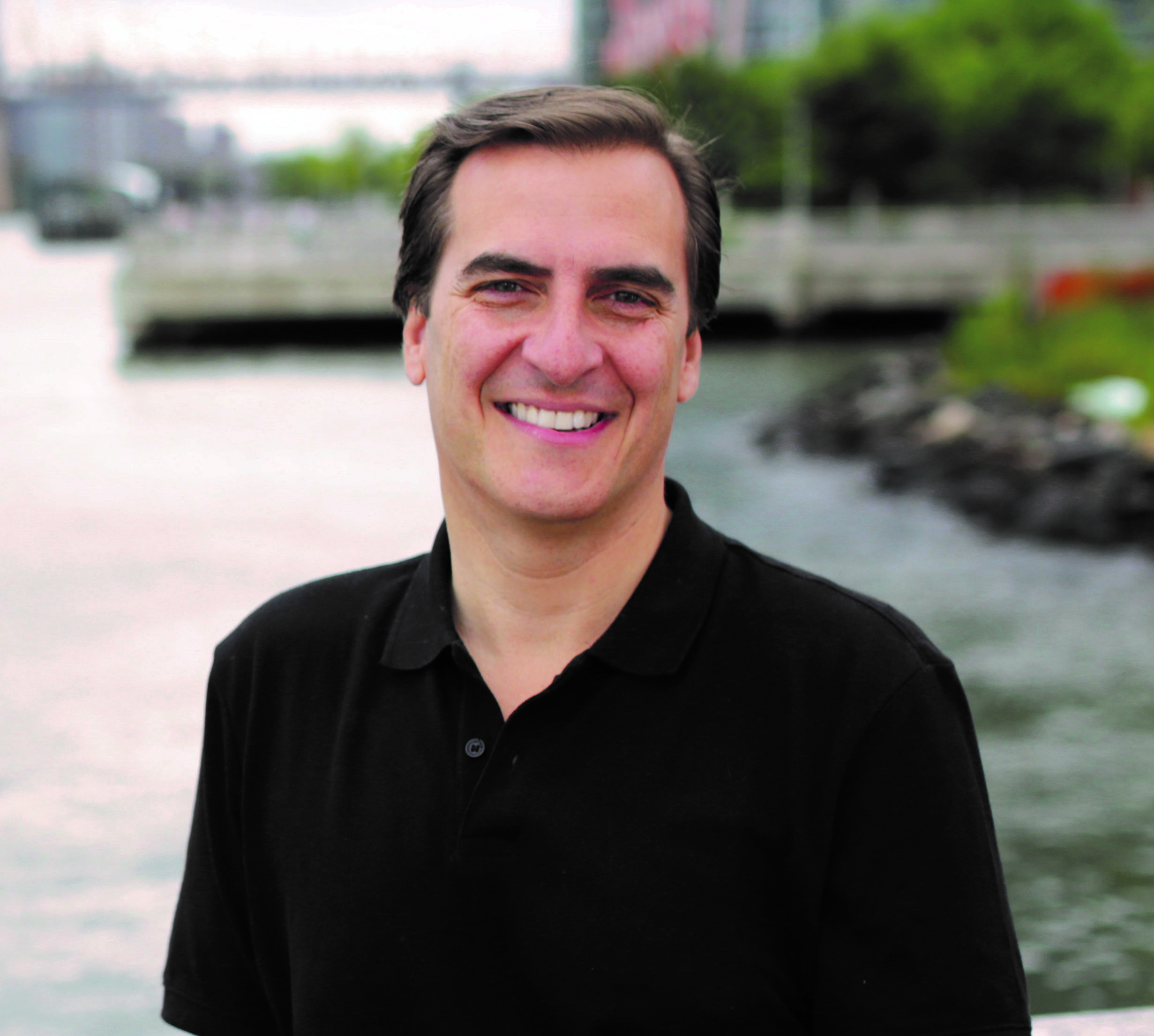
Gianaris in 2018

=== Education ===
In May 2024, Gianaris and Andrew Hevesi lobbied for $70 million for school safety equipment in religious and independent schools in the 2024-2025 state budget. they initially lobbied for $90 million but negotiated to $70 million.

=== Voting rights ===
In 2018, he introduced legislation to automatically register eligible voters otherwise interacting with state government.

In September 2023, governor Kathy Hochul signed his senate bill to expand early mail-in voting for all New Yorkers. Republican groups, including republican congresswoman Elise Stefanik, attempted to challenge this expansion but a state appellate rejected it and affirmed the law.

=== Gun control ===
In the 2023-2024 legislative session, Gianaris sponsored a bill to prohibit openly carrying a rifle or shotgun. Gianaris co-sponsored other bills such as S4818 which establishes a 10-day waiting period to buy a firearm.

=== Congestion pricing ===
Gianaris alongside Zohran Mamdani lobbied for $90 million in additional bus funding before congestion pricing took place to split half of it to fund more fare-free bus lines and the other half for increasing bus reliability. In response to Governor Kathy Hochul reversal on her support and implementation of congestion pricing, Gianaris opposed a payroll tax that was floated to replace the funding not generated by congestion pricing. He stated their reaction of her reversal "This whole thing was just dropped on us just yesterday and to expect us to have serious, substantive, deliberative discussion on such an important issue in 24 hours is unrealistic" and that "We put the burden on New York City to bail out the MTA just last year with this exact tax and I don’t think many of us who represent the city support doing it again".

=== Policing reform ===
Gianaris has supported bail reform and the elimination of cash bail.

== Personal life ==
Gianaris is married and resides in Astoria.
