= New York's 12th State Senate district =

American legislative district

Senator
Aber Kawas; D–Astoria
- Registration: 65.3% Democratic; 9.0% Republican; 22.1% No party preference
- Demographics: 36% White; 4% Black; 36% Hispanic; 21% Asian
- Population (2017): 331,564
- Registered voters: 191,906

New York's 12th State Senate district is one of 63 districts in the New York State Senate. It has been represented by Aber Kawas since November 2026, succeeding Michael Gianaris. In 2026, he announced that he would not seek re-election, then resigned early.

== Geography ==
District 12 is located primarily in Northwest Queens, covering the neighborhoods of Astoria, Long Island City, and Sunnyside, as well as parts of Woodside, Maspeth, Ridgewood and Woodhaven.

The district overlaps with New York's 6th, 7th, 8th, 12th, and 14th congressional districts, and with the 23rd, 30th, 34th, 36th, 37th, 38th, and 39th districts of the New York State Assembly.

== Recent election results ==
=== 2026 ===
2026 New York State Senate election, District 12
Primary election
Party	Candidate	Votes	%
Democratic	Aber Kawas	13,023	60.3
Democratic	Steven Raga	8,486	39.3
Write-in		82	0.4
Total votes		21,591	100.0
General election
Democratic	Aber Kawas		
Republican	Han-Khon To		
Write-in			
Total votes			100.0

=== 2024 ===
2024 New York State Senate election, District 12
Party	Candidate	Votes	%
Democratic	Michael Gianaris	48,820	
Working Families	Michael Gianaris	10,049	
Total	Michael Gianaris (incumbent)	58,869	67.4
Republican	Han-Khon To	28,192	32.3
Write-in		290	0.3
Total votes		87,351	100.0
Democratic hold			

=== 2022 ===
2022 New York State Senate election, District 12
Party	Candidate	Votes	%
Democratic	Michael Gianaris	31,752	
Working Families	Michael Gianaris	9,769	
Total	Michael Gianaris (incumbent)	41,521	98.4
Write-in		660	1.6
Total votes		42,181	100.0
Democratic hold			

=== 2020 ===
2020 New York State Senate election, District 12
Primary election
Party	Candidate	Votes	%
Democratic	Michael Gianaris (incumbent)	27,759	78.8
Democratic	Ignazio Terranova	7,361	20.9
Write-in		88	0.3
Total votes		35,208	100.0
General election
Democratic	Michael Gianaris	81,795	
Working Families	Michael Gianaris	18,876	
Total	Michael Gianaris (incumbent)	100,671	99.0
Write-in		1,029	1.0
Total votes		101,700	100.0
Democratic hold			

=== 2018 ===
2018 New York State Senate election, District 12
Party	Candidate	Votes	%
Democratic	Michael Gianaris	65,892	
Working Families	Michael Gianaris	6,076	
Total	Michael Gianaris (incumbent)	71,968	99.4
Write-in		414	0.6
Total votes		72,382	100.0
Democratic hold			

=== 2016 ===
2016 New York State Senate election, District 12
Party	Candidate	Votes	%
Democratic	Michael Gianaris	76,080	
Working Families	Michael Gianaris	6,248	
Total	Michael Gianaris (incumbent)	82,328	85.9
Republican	Marvin Jeffcoat	11,928	
Conservative	Marvin Jeffcoat	1,481	
Total	Marvin Jeffcoat	13,409	14.0
Write-in		114	0.1
Total votes		95,851	100.0
Democratic hold			

=== 2014 ===
2014 New York State Senate election, District 12
Party	Candidate	Votes	%
Democratic	Michael Gianaris	22,229	
Working Families	Michael Gianaris	3,752	
Total	Michael Gianaris (incumbent)	25,981	95.4
Stop Common Core	Anthony Aldorasi	1,158	4.2
Write-in		120	0.4
Total votes		27,259	100.0
Democratic hold			

=== 2012 ===
2012 New York State Senate election, District 12
Party	Candidate	Votes	%
Democratic	Michael Gianaris	58,576	
Working Families	Michael Gianaris	3,267	
Toal	Michael Gianaris (incumbent)	61,843	86.3
Republican	Tony Arcabascio	8,772	
Conservative	Tony Arcabascio	1,003	
Total	Tony Arcabascio	9,775	13.6
Write-in		43	0.1
Total votes		71,661	100.0
Democratic hold			

=== Federal results in District 12 ===
Year	Office	Results
2020	President	Biden 78.3 – 20.2%
2016	President	Clinton 81.0 – 15.8%
2012	President	Obama 82.6 – 15.8%
2012	Senate	Gillibrand 85.9 – 12.1%
