= Electoral history of Richard N. Gottfried =

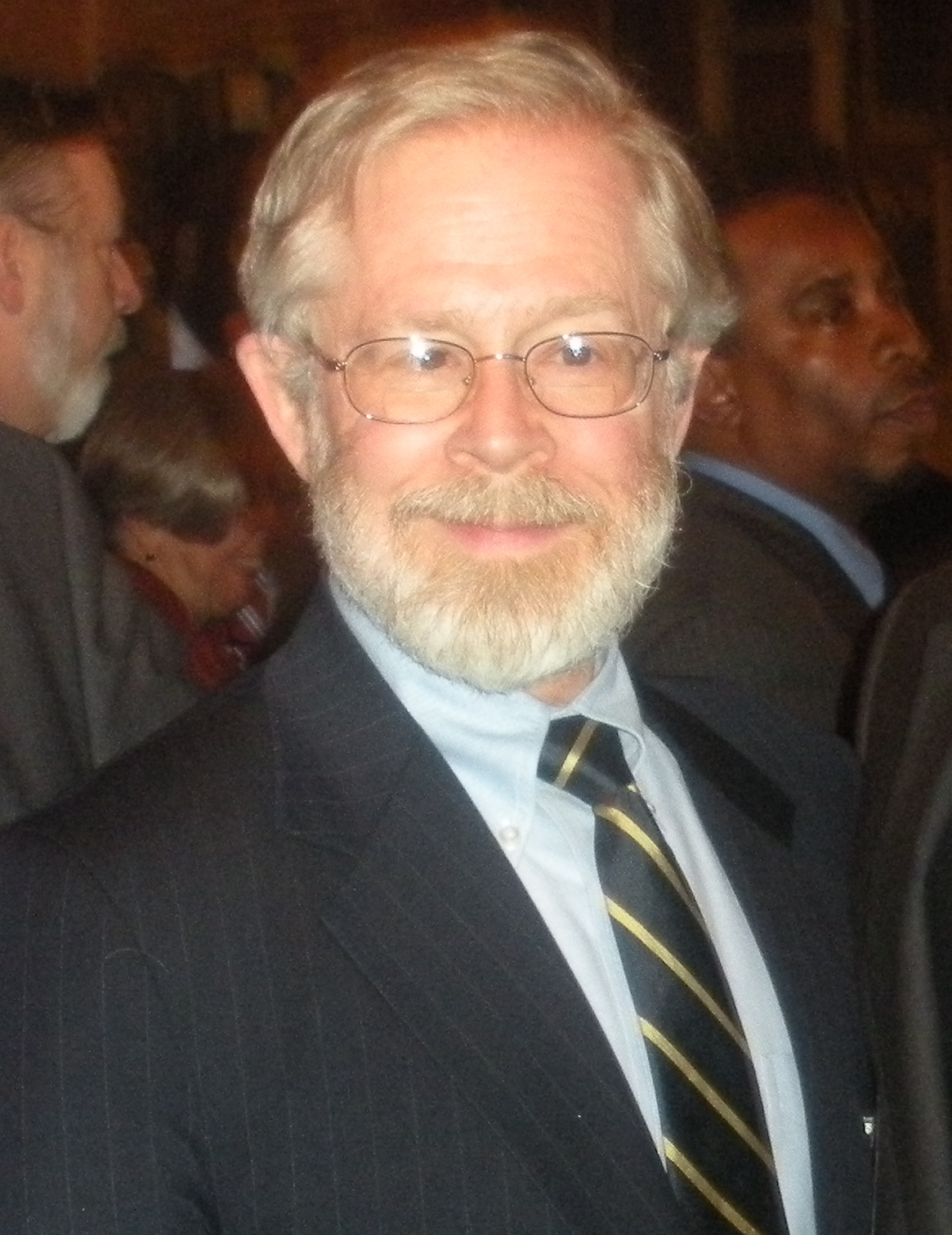
Assemblyman Richard N. Gottfried

Richard N. Gottfried is an American politician who served in the New York State Assembly, primarily representing the New York City borough of Manhattan in the Assembly. Gottfried served for 52 years, making him the longest-serving legislator in the history of the New York State Legislature. Before his tenure in the State Assembly, Gottfried earned his law degree from Columbia University.

== U.S. House of Representatives ==
1992 New York's 8th congressional district Democratic primary election
| Party | Candidate | Votes | % |
|---|---|---|---|
| Democratic | Jerry Nadler | 29,359 | 61.61% |
| Democratic | Ronnie Eldridge | 9,929 | 20.84% |
| Democratic | Franz S. Leichter | 4,876 | 10.23% |
| Democratic | Richard N. Gottfried | 2,678 | 5.62% |
| Democratic | Sonya Weiss | 712 | 1.49% |
| Democratic | Bella Abzug | 97 | 0.20% |
| Total votes | | 47,651 | 100.00% |

== New York State Assembly ==
=== 1970 ===
1970 New York State Assembly 65th district election
Primary election
| Party | Candidate | Votes | % |
|---|---|---|---|
| Democratic | Richard N. Gottfried | 5,112 | 58.31% |
| Democratic | Dorothy Walasek | 3,655 | 41.69% |
| Total votes | | 8,767 | 100.00% |
General election
| Democratic | Richard N. Gottfried | 13,996 | 61.03% |
| Republican | John J. McCann | 5,304 | 23.13% |
| Liberal | Harold Malin | 2,525 | 11.01% |
| Conservative | Ernest Van Denhaag | 1,107 | 4.83% |
| Total votes | | 22,932 | 100.00% |

=== 1972 ===
1972 New York State Assembly 67th district election
| Party | Candidate | Votes | % |
|---|---|---|---|
| Democratic | Richard N. Gottfried (incumbent) | 25,465 | 66.38% |
| Liberal | Richard N. Gottfried (incumbent) | 3,075 | 8.02% |
| Total | Richard N. Gottfried (incumbent) | 28,540 | 74.40% |
| Republican | Martin E. Nixon | 8,412 | 21.93% |
| Conservative | Martin E. Nixon | 1,410 | 3.68% |
| Total | Martin E. Nixon | 9,822 | 25.60% |
| Total votes | | 38,362 | 100.00% |

=== 1974 ===
1974 New York State Assembly 67th district election
| Party | Candidate | Votes | % |
|---|---|---|---|
| Democratic | Richard N. Gottfried (incumbent) | 18,008 | 68.50% |
| Liberal | Richard N. Gottfried (incumbent) | 3,345 | 12.72% |
| Total | Richard N. Gottfried (incumbent) | 21,353 | 81.22% |
| Republican | John J. McCann | 4,091 | 15.56% |
| Conservative | Herbert Bauer | 845 | 3.21% |
| Total votes | | 26,289 | 100.00% |

=== 1976 ===
1976 New York State Assembly 67th district election
| Party | Candidate | Votes | % |
|---|---|---|---|
| Democratic | Richard N. Gottfried (incumbent) | 24,206 | 69.09% |
| Liberal | Richard N. Gottfried (incumbent) | 3,536 | 10.09% |
| Total | Richard N. Gottfried (incumbent) | 27,742 | 79.19% |
| Republican | Roslyn S. "Roz" Epstein | 6,269 | 17.90% |
| Conservative | John Persakis | 1,022 | 2.92% |
| Total votes | | 35,033 | 100.00% |

=== 1978 ===
1978 New York State Assembly 67th district election
| Party | Candidate | Votes | % |
|---|---|---|---|
| Democratic | Richard N. Gottfried (incumbent) | 16,897 | 68.86% |
| Liberal | Richard N. Gottfried (incumbent) | 2,320 | 9.45% |
| Total | Richard N. Gottfried (incumbent) | 19,217 | 78.32% |
| Republican | Roslyn S. "Roz" Epstein | 4,878 | 19.88% |
| Independent Action | Roslyn S. "Roz" Epstein | 443 | 1.81% |
| Total | Roslyn S. "Roz" Epstein | 5,321 | 21.68% |
| Total votes | | 24,538 | 100.00% |

=== 1980 ===
1980 New York State Assembly 67th district election
| Party | Candidate | Votes | % |
|---|---|---|---|
| Democratic | Richard N. Gottfried (incumbent) | 29,114 | 78.19% |
| Republican | Margaret D. Clemons | 8,120 | 21.81% |
| Total votes | | 37,234 | 100.00% |

=== 1982 ===
1982 New York State Assembly 64th district election
| Party | Candidate | Votes | % |
|---|---|---|---|
| Democratic | Richard N. Gottfried (incumbent) | 20,773 | 81.57% |
| Republican | Peter R. Hauspurg | 4,227 | 16.60% |
| Conservative | Byron Paul Bales | 467 | 1.83% |
| Total votes | | 25,467 | 100.00% |

=== 1984 ===
1984 New York State Assembly 64th district election
| Party | Candidate | Votes | % |
|---|---|---|---|
| Democratic | Richard N. Gottfried (incumbent) | 16,319 | 69.17% |
| Liberal | Richard N. Gottfried (incumbent) | 1,198 | 5.08% |
| Total | Richard N. Gottfried (incumbent) | 17,517 | 74.25% |
| Republican | Claire A. Peterson | 5,658 | 23.98% |
| Conservative | Byron Paul Bales | 418 | 1.77% |
| Total votes | | 23,593 | 100.00% |

=== 1986 ===
1986 New York State Assembly 64th district election
| Party | Candidate | Votes | % |
|---|---|---|---|
| Democratic | Richard N. Gottfried (incumbent) | 18,041 | 82.15% |
| Republican | Joseph Corroppoli | 3,549 | 16.16% |
| Conservative | Lucien V. Orasel | 370 | 1.69% |
| Total votes | | 21,960 | 100.00% |

=== 1988 ===
1988 New York State Assembly 64th district election
| Party | Candidate | Votes | % |
|---|---|---|---|
| Democratic | Richard N. Gottfried (incumbent) | 32,289 | 79.58% |
| Republican | John J. McCann | 7,524 | 18.54% |
| Conservative | Margaret V. Byrnes | 761 | 1.88% |
| Total votes | | 40,574 | 100.00% |

=== 1990 ===
1990 New York State Assembly 64th district election
| Party | Candidate | Votes | % |
|---|---|---|---|
| Democratic | Richard N. Gottfried (incumbent) | 15,413 | 91.65% |
| Conservative | Margaret V. Byrnes | 1,405 | 8.35% |
| Total votes | | 16,818 | 100.00% |

=== 1992 ===
1992 New York State Assembly 64th district election
Primary election
| Party | Candidate | Votes | % |
|---|---|---|---|
| Democratic | Richard N. Gottfried (incumbent) | 8,804 | 71.66% |
| Democratic | Daniel Friedman | 3,482 | 28.34% |
| Total votes | | 12,286 | 100.00% |
General election
| Democratic | Richard N. Gottfried (incumbent) | 31,163 | 78.26% |
| Republican | Barbara L. David | 8,335 | 20.93% |
| New Alliance | Daniel Friedman | 322 | 0.81% |
| Total votes | | 39,820 | 100.00% |

=== 1994 ===
1994 New York State Assembly 64th district election
| Party | Candidate | Votes | % |
|---|---|---|---|
| Democratic | Richard N. Gottfried (incumbent) | 22,912 | 88.14% |
| Liberal | Richard N. Gottfried (incumbent) | 1,909 | 7.34% |
| Other | Richard N. Gottfried (incumbent) | 548 | 2.11% |
| Total | Richard N. Gottfried (incumbent) | 25,369 | 97.59% |
| Independence | Delco L. Cornett | 627 | 2.41% |
| Total votes | | 25,996 | 100.00% |

=== 1996 ===
1996 New York State Assembly 64th district election
| Party | Candidate | Votes | % |
|---|---|---|---|
| Democratic | Richard N. Gottfried (incumbent) | 29,223 | 93.07% |
| Liberal | Richard N. Gottfried (incumbent) | 2,176 | 6.93% |
| Total | Richard N. Gottfried (incumbent) | 31,399 | 100.00% |
| Total votes | | 31,399 | 100.00% |
| | Blank/Void/Scattering | 15,023 | |

=== 1998 ===
1998 New York State Assembly 64th district election
| Party | Candidate | Votes | % |
|---|---|---|---|
| Democratic | Richard N. Gottfried (incumbent) | 23,599 | 79.07% |
| Liberal | Richard N. Gottfried (incumbent) | 1,077 | 3.61% |
| Total | Richard N. Gottfried (incumbent) | 24,676 | 82.67% |
| Republican | Dale Mc E. Cormick | 4,501 | 15.08% |
| Independence | Dale Mc E. Cormick | 276 | 0.92% |
| Total | Dale Mc E. Cormick | 4,777 | 16.00% |
| Conservative | Margaret V. Byrnes | 394 | 1.32% |
| Total votes | | 29,847 | 100.00% |
| | Blank/Void/Miscellaneous | 6,030 | |

=== 2000 ===
2000 New York State Assembly 64th district election
| Party | Candidate | Votes | % |
|---|---|---|---|
| Democratic | Richard N. Gottfried (incumbent) | 33,830 | 92.31% |
| Working Families | Richard N. Gottfried (incumbent) | 1,660 | 4.53% |
| Liberal | Richard N. Gottfried (incumbent) | 1,157 | 3.16% |
| Total | Richard N. Gottfried (incumbent) | 36,647 | 100.00% |
| Total votes | | 36,647 | 100.00% |
| | Blank/Void/Scattering | 18,144 | |

=== 2002 ===
2002 New York State Assembly 75th district election
| Party | Candidate | Votes | % |
|---|---|---|---|
| Democratic | Richard N. Gottfried (incumbent) | 18,176 | 68.31% |
| Working Families | Richard N. Gottfried (incumbent) | 1,712 | 6.43% |
| Liberal | Richard N. Gottfried (incumbent) | 646 | 2.43% |
| Total | Richard N. Gottfried (incumbent) | 20,534 | 77.17% |
| Republican | Dan Latner | 4,939 | 18.56% |
| Independence | Dan Latner | 323 | 1.21% |
| Conservative | Dan Latner | 185 | 0.70% |
| Total | Dan Latner | 5,447 | 20.47% |
| Green | George Tatevosyan | 627 | 2.36% |
| Total votes | | 26,608 | 100.00% |
| | Blank/Void/Scattering | 6,772 | |

=== 2004 ===
2004 New York State Assembly 75th district election
| Party | Candidate | Votes | % |
|---|---|---|---|
| Democratic | Richard N. Gottfried (incumbent) | 41,362 | 95.15% |
| Working Families | Richard N. Gottfried (incumbent) | 2,109 | 4.85% |
| Total | Richard N. Gottfried (incumbent) | 43,471 | 100.00% |
| Total votes | | 43,471 | 100.00% |
| | Blank/Void/Scattering | 20,293 | |

=== 2006 ===
2006 New York State Assembly 75th district election
| Party | Candidate | Votes | % |
|---|---|---|---|
| Democratic | Richard N. Gottfried (incumbent) | 25,725 | 88.13% |
| Working Families | Richard N. Gottfried (incumbent) | 3,465 | 11.87% |
| Total | Richard N. Gottfried (incumbent) | 29,190 | 100.00% |
| Total votes | | 29,190 | 100.00% |
| | Blank/Void/Scattering | 7,770 | |

=== 2008 ===
2008 New York State Assembly 75th district election
| Party | Candidate | Votes | % |
|---|---|---|---|
| Democratic | Richard N. Gottfried (incumbent) | 41,364 | 78.28% |
| Working Families | Richard N. Gottfried (incumbent) | 2,095 | 3.96% |
| Total | Richard N. Gottfried (incumbent) | 43,459 | 82.25% |
| Republican | Saul J. Farber | 8,478 | 16.05% |
| Independence | Saul J. Farber | 896 | 1.70% |
| Total | Saul J. Farber | 9,374 | 17.74% |
| Write-in | | 5 | 0.01% |
| Total votes | | 52,838 | 100.00% |
| | Blank | 12,636 | |

=== 2010 ===
2010 New York State Assembly 75th district election
| Party | Candidate | Votes | % |
|---|---|---|---|
| Democratic | Richard N. Gottfried (incumbent) | 23,069 | 72.08% |
| Working Families | Richard N. Gottfried (incumbent) | 3,016 | 9.42% |
| Total | Richard N. Gottfried (incumbent) | 26,085 | 81.51% |
| Republican | Michael W. Chan | 5,893 | 18.41% |
| Write-in | | 26 | 0.08% |
| Total votes | | 32,004 | 100.00% |
| | Blank | 3,586 | |

=== 2012 ===
2012 New York State Assembly 75th district election
| Party | Candidate | Votes | % |
|---|---|---|---|
| Democratic | Richard N. Gottfried (incumbent) | 36,400 | 93.68% |
| Working Families | Richard N. Gottfried (incumbent) | 2,362 | 6.08% |
| Total | Richard N. Gottfried (incumbent) | 38,762 | 99.76% |
| Write-in | | 94 | 0.24% |
| Total votes | | 38,856 | 100.00% |
| | Blank | 13,224 | |

=== 2014 ===
2014 New York State Assembly 75th district election
| Party | Candidate | Votes | % |
|---|---|---|---|
| Democratic | Richard N. Gottfried (incumbent) | 14,902 | 69.75% |
| Working Families | Richard N. Gottfried (incumbent) | 3,469 | 16.24% |
| Total | Richard N. Gottfried (incumbent) | 18,371 | 85.99% |
| Republican | Harry DeMell | 2,964 | 13.87% |
| Write-in | | 30 | 0.14% |
| Total votes | | 21,365 | 100.00% |
| | Blank | 1,207 | |

=== 2016 ===
2016 New York State Assembly 75th district election
| Party | Candidate | Votes | % |
|---|---|---|---|
| Democratic | Richard N. Gottfried (incumbent) | 43,648 | 79.77% |
| Working Families | Richard N. Gottfried (incumbent) | 2,538 | 4.64% |
| Total | Richard N. Gottfried (incumbent) | 46,186 | 84.41% |
| Republican | Joseph A. Maffia | 8,249 | 15.08% |
| Reform | Joseph A. Maffia | 213 | 0.39% |
| Total | Joseph A. Maffia | 8,462 | 15.47% |
| Write-in | | 66 | 0.12% |
| Total votes | | 54,714 | 100.00% |
| | Blank | 4,642 | |

=== 2018 ===
2018 New York State Assembly 75th district election
| Party | Candidate | Votes | % |
|---|---|---|---|
| Democratic | Richard N. Gottfried (incumbent) | 40,462 | 91.68% |
| Working Families | Richard N. Gottfried (incumbent) | 2,730 | 6.19% |
| We the People | Richard N. Gottfried (incumbent) | 612 | 0.14% |
| Total | Richard N. Gottfried (incumbent) | 43,804 | 99.26% |
| Write-in | | 328 | 0.74% |
| Total votes | | 44,132 | 100.00% |
| | Blank | 4,775 | |

=== 2020 ===
2020 New York State Assembly 75th district election
| Party | Candidate | Votes | % |
|---|---|---|---|
| Democratic | Richard N. Gottfried (incumbent) | 46,791 | 86.58% |
| Working Families | Richard N. Gottfried (incumbent) | 6,782 | 12.55% |
| Total | Richard N. Gottfried (incumbent) | 53,573 | 99.13% |
| Write-in | | 469 | 0.87% |
| Total votes | | 54,042 | 100.00% |
| | Blank/Void | 8,270 | |
