= Electoral history of Jerry Nadler =

American political record

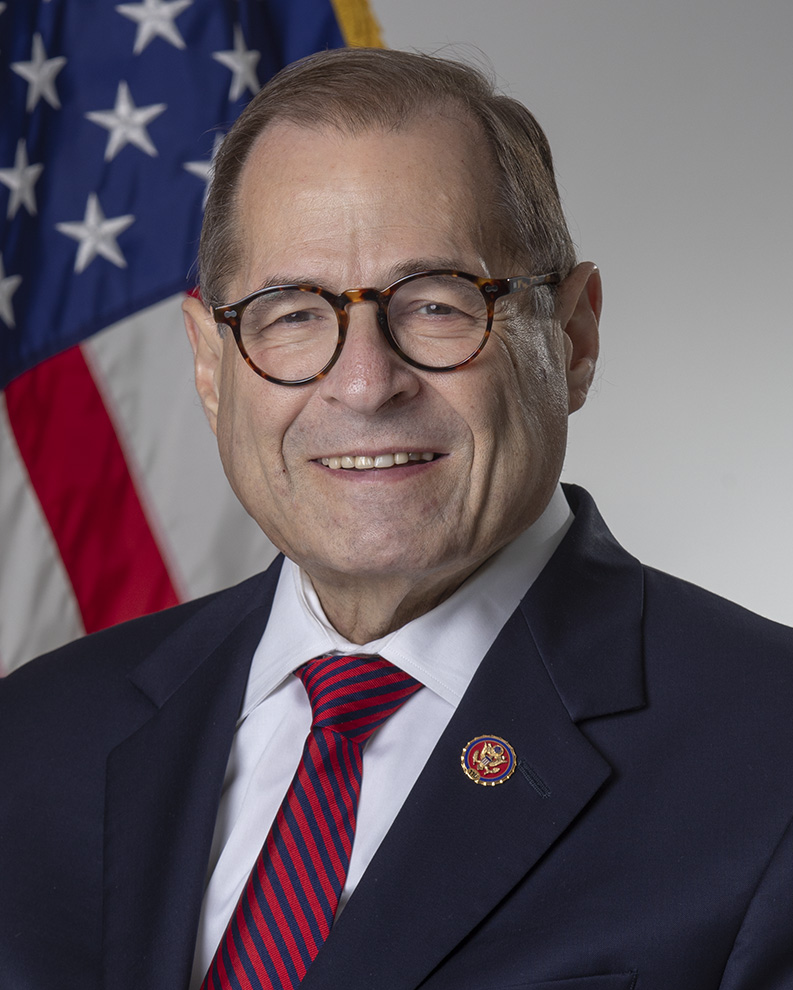
Official portrait, 2019

Jerry Nadler is a lawyer and politician currently representing New York's 12th congressional district since 2023. Nadler has been a member of the U.S. House of Representatives since 1992. Before his term in Congress, Nadler was a member of the New York State Assembly from 1977 to 1992. In the 1980's, Nadler unsuccessfully ran for Manhattan Borough President and New York City Comptroller—to date, the only times he has ever lost an election. In both the New York State Assembly and the U.S. House, Nadler has primarily represented New York City as he has lived most of his life in the city. Nadler is currently the dean of the U.S. House delegation from New York.

== New York State Assembly ==
1976 New York State Assembly 69th district election
Primary election
Party	Candidate	Votes	%
Democratic	Jerry Nadler	3,879	25.48%
Democratic	Ruth Messinger	3,856	25.33%
Democratic	Ludwig Gelobter	2,481	16.29%
Democratic	David Kornbluh	1,617	10.62%
Democratic	Ruth M. Gonchar	1,283	8.43%
Democratic	Michael M. Ehrmann	1,198	7.87%
Democratic	Sharen E. Lauer	912	5.99%
Total votes		15,226	100.00%
General election
Democratic	Jerry Nadler	26,364	73.69%
Liberal	Ronald A. Zweibel	3,412	9.54%
Republican	Robert V. Jackson	3,294	9.21%
Working People's	Joyce Dattner	1,742	4.87%
Conservative	Constance B. Christopher	965	2.70%
Total votes		35,777	100.00%

1978 New York State Assembly 69th district election
Party	Candidate	Votes	%
Democratic	Jerry Nadler (incumbent)	16,095	74.25%
Liberal	Jerry Nadler (incumbent)	2,809	12.96%
Total	Jerry Nadler (incumbent)	18,904	87.20%
Republican	Nick Tiappalou	2,774	12.80%
Total votes		21,678	100.00%

1980 New York State Assembly 69th district election
Party	Candidate	Votes	%
Democratic	Jerry Nadler (incumbent)	29,427	87.14%
Republican	Robert S. Marcus	4,344	12.86%
Total votes		21,678	100.00%

1982 New York State Assembly 67th district election
Primary election
Party	Candidate	Votes	%
Democratic	Jerry Nadler (incumbent)	8,673	79.79%
Democratic	Gary Sinawski	2,197	20.21%
Total votes		10,960	100.00%
General election
Democratic	Jerry Nadler (incumbent)	25,971	82.07%
Republican	Eleanor Friedman	4,592	14.51%
New Alliance	Gary Sinawski	707	2.23%
Conservative	Benton Cole	375	1.19%
Total votes		31,645	100.00%

1984 New York State Assembly 67th district election
Party	Candidate	Votes	%
Democratic	Jerry Nadler (incumbent)	36,363	74.73%
Liberal	Jerry Nadler (incumbent)	2,574	5.29%
Total	Jerry Nadler (incumbent)	38,937	80.02%
Republican	Eleanor Friedman	8,994	18.48%
Conservative	Benton Cole	726	1.49%
Total votes		48,657	100.00%

1986 New York State Assembly 67th district election
Party	Candidate	Votes	%
Democratic	Jerry Nadler (incumbent)	23,184	86.06%
Republican	Jeffrey C. Carter	3,413	12.67%
Conservative	Benton Cole	342	1.27%
Total votes		26,939	100.00%

1988 New York State Assembly 67th district election
Party	Candidate	Votes	%
Democratic	Jerry Nadler (incumbent)	37,965	82.02%
Republican	Vincent McGowan	7,521	16.25%
Conservative	Wallace Kramer	533	1.15%
New Alliance	Freda Rosen	269	0.58%
Total votes		46,288	100.00%

1990 New York State Assembly 67th district election
Party	Candidate	Votes	%
Democratic	Jerry Nadler (incumbent)	20,169	83.48%
Republican	Vincent McGowan	3,764	15.58%
New Alliance	Warren Liebesman	228	0.94%
Total votes		24,161	100.00%

1992 New York State Assembly 67th district Democratic primary (Note: In 1992, Nadler was nominated by convention to replace Ted Weiss for the 8th district congressional election, who was posthumously nominated in the 8th district congressional Democratic primary the day after his death. Nadler was concurrently on the ballot for the 17th district congressional special election to fill the remainder of Weiss's term and the full term in the 8th district. Nadler also won the Democratic nomination for the 67th State Assembly district in the 1992 primary, but was replaced for the Democratic nomination when he ran to fill Weiss's seat.)
Party	Candidate	Votes	%
Democratic	Jerry Nadler (incumbent)	15,413	89.17%
Democratic	Harry M. Kresky	1,873	10.84%
Total votes		17,286	100.00%

== New York City Offices ==
1985 Manhattan Borough President election
Primary election
Party	Candidate	Votes	%
Democratic	David Dinkins	94,651	64.75%
Democratic	Jerry Nadler	51,518	35.25%
Total votes		146,169	100.00%
General election
Democratic	David Dinkins	158,757	77.47%
Liberal	Jerry Nadler	24,142	11.78%
Republican	Henry E. Del Rosso	21,169	10.33%
Spartacist League	Edward A. Kartsen	864	0.42%
Total votes		204,932	100.00%

1989 New York City Comptroller Democratic primary
Party	Candidate	Votes	%
Democratic	Elizabeth Holtzman	439,945	47.43%
Democratic	Alan Hevesi	226,004	24.36%
Democratic	Frank Macchiarola	196,201	21.15%
Democratic	Jerry Nadler	35,749	3.85%
Democratic	Stephen J. Rose	29,751	3.21%
Total votes		927,650	100.00%

== U.S. House of Representatives ==
1992 New York's 17th congressional district special election
Party	Candidate	Votes	%
Democratic	Jerry Nadler	143,727	95.11%
Liberal	Jerry Nadler	7,395	4.89%
Total	Jerry Nadler	151,122	100.00%
Total votes		151,122	100.00%

1992 New York's 8th congressional district election
Primary election
Party	Candidate	Votes	%
Democratic	Jerry Nadler	29,359	61.61%
Democratic	Ronnie Eldridge	9,929	20.84%
Democratic	Franz S. Leichter	4,876	10.23%
Democratic	Richard N. Gottfried	2,678	5.62%
Democratic	Sonya Weiss	712	1.49%
Democratic	Bella Abzug	97	0.20%
Total votes		47,651	100.00%
General election
Democratic	Jerry Nadler	132,172	77.63%
Liberal	Jerry Nadler	6,124	3.60%
Total	Jerry Nadler	138,296	81.23%
Republican	David L. Askren	25,548	15.01%
Conservative	Margaret V. Byrnes	5,180	3.04%
New Alliance	Arthur R. Block	1,224	0.72%
Total votes		170,248	100.00%

1994 New York's 8th congressional district election
Primary election
Party	Candidate	Votes	%
Democratic	Jerry Nadler (incumbent)	33,658	62.01%
Democratic	Thomas Duane	15,820	29.15%
Democratic	Deborah Green	4,803	8.85%
Total votes		54,281	100.00%
General election
Democratic	Jerry Nadler (incumbent)	103,268	77.02%
Liberal	Jerry Nadler (incumbent)	6,678	4.98%
Total	Jerry Nadler (incumbent)	109,946	82.00%
Republican	David L. Askren	21,132	15.76%
Conservative	Margaret V. Byrnes	3,008	2.24%
Total votes		134,086	100.00%

1996 New York's 8th congressional district election
Primary election
Party	Candidate	Votes	%
Democratic	Jerry Nadler (incumbent)	28,466	83.63%
Democratic	Brian W. Steel	3,903	11.47%
Democratic	Matthew W. Sperling	1,668	4.90%
Total votes		34,037	100.00%
General election
Democratic	Jerry Nadler (incumbent)	123,809	77.21%
Liberal	Jerry Nadler (incumbent)	8,134	5.07%
Total	Jerry Nadler (incumbent)	131,943	82.28%
Republican	Michael Benjamin	25,005	15.59%
Freedom Party	Michael Benjamin	1,023	0.64%
Total	Michael Benjamin	26,028	16.23%
Conservative	George A. Galip, Jr.	2,381	1.48%
Total votes		160,352	100.00%
	Blank/Void/Scattering	37,508	

1998 New York's 8th congressional district election
Party	Candidate	Votes	%
Democratic	Jerry Nadler (incumbent)	108,408	82.55%
Liberal	Jerry Nadler (incumbent)	4,540	3.46%
Total	Jerry Nadler (incumbent)	112,948	86.00%
Republican	Theodore Howard	18,383	14.00%
Total votes		131,331	100.00%
	Blank/Void/Scattering	26,846	

2000 New York's 8th congressional district election
Party	Candidate	Votes	%
Democratic	Jerry Nadler (incumbent)	139,936	75.65%
Working Families	Jerry Nadler (incumbent)	6,724	3.64%
Liberal	Jerry Nadler (incumbent)	3,613	1.95%
Total	Jerry Nadler (incumbent)	150,273	81.24%
Republican	Marian S. Henry	27,057	14.63%
Green	Dan Wentzel	4,765	2.58%
Conservative	Anthony A. LaBella	1,849	1.00%
Independence	Harry Kresky	1,025	0.55%
Total votes		184,969	100.00%
	Blank/Void/Scattering	42,615	

2002 New York's 8th congressional district election
Party	Candidate	Votes	%
Democratic	Jerry Nadler (incumbent)	71,996	67.61%
Working Families	Jerry Nadler (incumbent)	6,390	6.00%
Liberal	Jerry Nadler (incumbent)	2,616	2.46%
Total	Jerry Nadler (incumbent)	81,002	76.07%
Republican	Jim Farrin	18,623	17.49%
Independence	Jim Farrin	1,051	0.99%
Total	Jim Farrin	19,674	18.48%
Conservative	Alan Jay Gerber	3,361	3.16%
Green	Dan Wentzel	1,918	1.80%
Libertarian	Joseph Dobrian	526	0.49%
Total votes		106,481	100.00%
	Blank/Void/Scattering	35,095	

2004 New York's 8th congressional district election
Party	Candidate	Votes	%
Democratic	Jerry Nadler (incumbent)	154,098	76.54%
Working Families	Jerry Nadler (incumbent)	7,984	3.97%
Total	Jerry Nadler (incumbent)	162,082	80.51%
Republican	Peter Hort	35,177	17.47%
Independence	Peter Hort	2,421	1.20%
Conservative	Peter Hort	1,642	0.82%
Total	Peter Hort	39,240	19.49%
Total votes		201,322	100.00%
	Blank/Void/Scattering	50,328	

2006 New York's 8th congressional district election
Party	Candidate	Votes	%
Democratic	Jerry Nadler (incumbent)	96,115	75.31%
Working Families	Jerry Nadler (incumbent)	12,421	9.73%
Total	Jerry Nadler (incumbent)	108,536	85.04%
Republican	Eleanor Friedman	17,413	13.64%
Conservative	Dennis E. Adornato	1,673	1.31%
Total votes		127,622	100.00%
	Blank/Void/Scattering	14,906	

2008 New York's 8th congressional district election
Party	Candidate	Votes	%
Democratic	Jerry Nadler (incumbent)	152,153	76.13%
Working Families	Jerry Nadler (incumbent)	8,622	4.31%
Total	Jerry Nadler (incumbent)	160,775	80.44%
Republican	Grace Lin	36,897	18.46%
Conservative	Grace Lin	2,165	1.08%
Total	Grace Lin	39,062	19.54%
Write-in		24	0.01%
Total votes		199,861	100.00%
	Blank	53,374	

2010 New York's 8th congressional district election
Party	Candidate	Votes	%
Democratic	Jerry Nadler (incumbent)	88,758	67.79%
Working Families	Jerry Nadler (incumbent)	10,081	7.70%
Total	Jerry Nadler (incumbent)	98,839	75.49%
Republican	Susan L. Kone	29,514	22.54%
Conservative	Susan L. Kone	2,482	1.90%
Total	Susan L. Kone	31,996	24.44%
Write-in		93	0.07%
Total votes		130,928	100.00%
	Blank	12,198	

2012 New York's 10th congressional district election
Party	Candidate	Votes	%
Democratic	Jerry Nadler (incumbent)	156,619	76.27%
Working Families	Jerry Nadler (incumbent)	9,124	4.44%
Total	Jerry Nadler (incumbent)	165,743	80.71%
Republican	Michael W. Chan	35,538	17.31%
Conservative	Michael W. Chan	3,875	1.89%
Total	Michael W. Chan	39,413	19.19%
Write-in		193	0.09%
Total votes		205,349	100.00%
	Blank	32,126	

2014 New York's 10th congressional district election
Party	Candidate	Votes	%
Democratic	Jerry Nadler (incumbent)	73,945	72.58%
Working Families	Jerry Nadler (incumbent)	15,135	14.86%
Total	Jerry Nadler (incumbent)	89,080	87.44%
Conservative	Ross Brady	12,042	11.82%
FEP	Michael J. Dilger	554	0.54%
Write-in		205	0.20%
Total votes		101,881	100.00%
	Blank	11,345	

2016 New York's 10th congressional district election
Primary election
Party	Candidate	Votes	%
Democratic	Jerry Nadler (incumbent)	27,270	89.48%
Democratic	Mikhail Oliver Rosenberg	3,206	10.52%
Total votes		30,476	100.00%
General election
Democratic	Jerry Nadler (incumbent)	180,117	73.06%
Working Families	Jerry Nadler (incumbent)	10,471	4.25%
We the People	Jerry Nadler (incumbent)	1,783	0.72%
Total	Jerry Nadler (incumbent)	192,371	78.03%
Republican	Philip Rosenthal	46,275	18.77%
Conservative	Philip Rosenthal	4,646	1.88%
Independence	Philip Rosenthal	2,093	0.85%
SID	Philip Rosenthal	843	0.34%
Total	Philip Rosenthal	53,857	21.85%
Write-in		297	0.12%
Total votes		246,525	100.00%
	Blank	19,991	

2018 New York's 10th congressional district election
Party	Candidate	Votes	%
Democratic	Jerry Nadler (incumbent)	162,131	76.85%
Working Families	Jerry Nadler (incumbent)	10,964	5.20%
Total	Jerry Nadler (incumbent)	173,095	82.05%
Republican	Naomi Levin	33,692	15.97%
Conservative	Naomi Levin	3,259	1.54%
Reform	Naomi Levin	668	0.32%
Total	Naomi Levin	37,619	17.83%
Write-in		244	0.12%
Total votes		210,958	100.00%
	Blank	5,314	

2020 New York's 10th congressional district election
Primary election
Party	Candidate	Votes	%
Democratic	Jerry Nadler (incumbent)	51,037	67.34%
Democratic	Lindsey Boylan	16,495	21.76%
Democratic	Jonathan Herzog	7,818	10.31%
Write-in		445	0.59%
Total votes		75,795	100.00%
	Blank	3,630	
General election
Democratic	Jerry Nadler (incumbent)	181,215	65.43%
Working Families	Jerry Nadler (incumbent)	25,095	9.06%
Total	Jerry Nadler (incumbent)	206,310	74.49%
Republican	Cathy A. Bernstein	61,045	22.04%
Conservative	Cathy A. Bernstein	5,844	2.11%
Total	Cathy A. Bernstein	66,889	24.15%
Libertarian	Michael Madrid	3,370	1.22%
Write-in		407	0.15%
Total votes		276,976	100.00%
	Blank/Void	12,154	

2022 New York's 12th congressional district election
Primary election
Party	Candidate	Votes	%
Democratic	Jerry Nadler (incumbent)	49,744	55.43%
Democratic	Carolyn Maloney (incumbent)	21,916	24.42%
Democratic	Suraj Patel	17,011	18.96%
Democratic	Ashmi Sheth	937	1.04%
Write-in		128	0.14%
Total votes		89,736	100.00%
General election
Democratic	Jerry Nadler (incumbent)	184,872	75.12%
Working Families	Jerry Nadler (incumbent)	16,018	6.51%
Total	Jerry Nadler (incumbent)	200,890	81.63%
Republican	Michael K. Zumbluskas	40,994	16.66%
Conservative	Michael K. Zumbluskas	2,715	1.10%
Parent	Michael K. Zumbluskas	464	0.19%
Total	Michael K. Zumbluskas	44,173	17.95%
Itkis	Mikhail Itkis	631	0.26%
Write-in		411	0.17%
Total votes		246,105	100.00%
	Blank	4,973	

2024 New York's 12th congressional district election
Party	Candidate	Votes	%
Democratic	Jerry Nadler (incumbent)	243,111	75.03%
Working Families	Jerry Nadler (incumbent)	17,054	5.26%
Total	Jerry Nadler (incumbent)	260,165	80.29%
Republican	Michael K. Zumbluskas	62,989	19.44%
Write-in		866	0.27%
Total votes		324,020	100.00%
	Blank	17,949	
