= Linda Rosenthal =

American politician (born 1957)

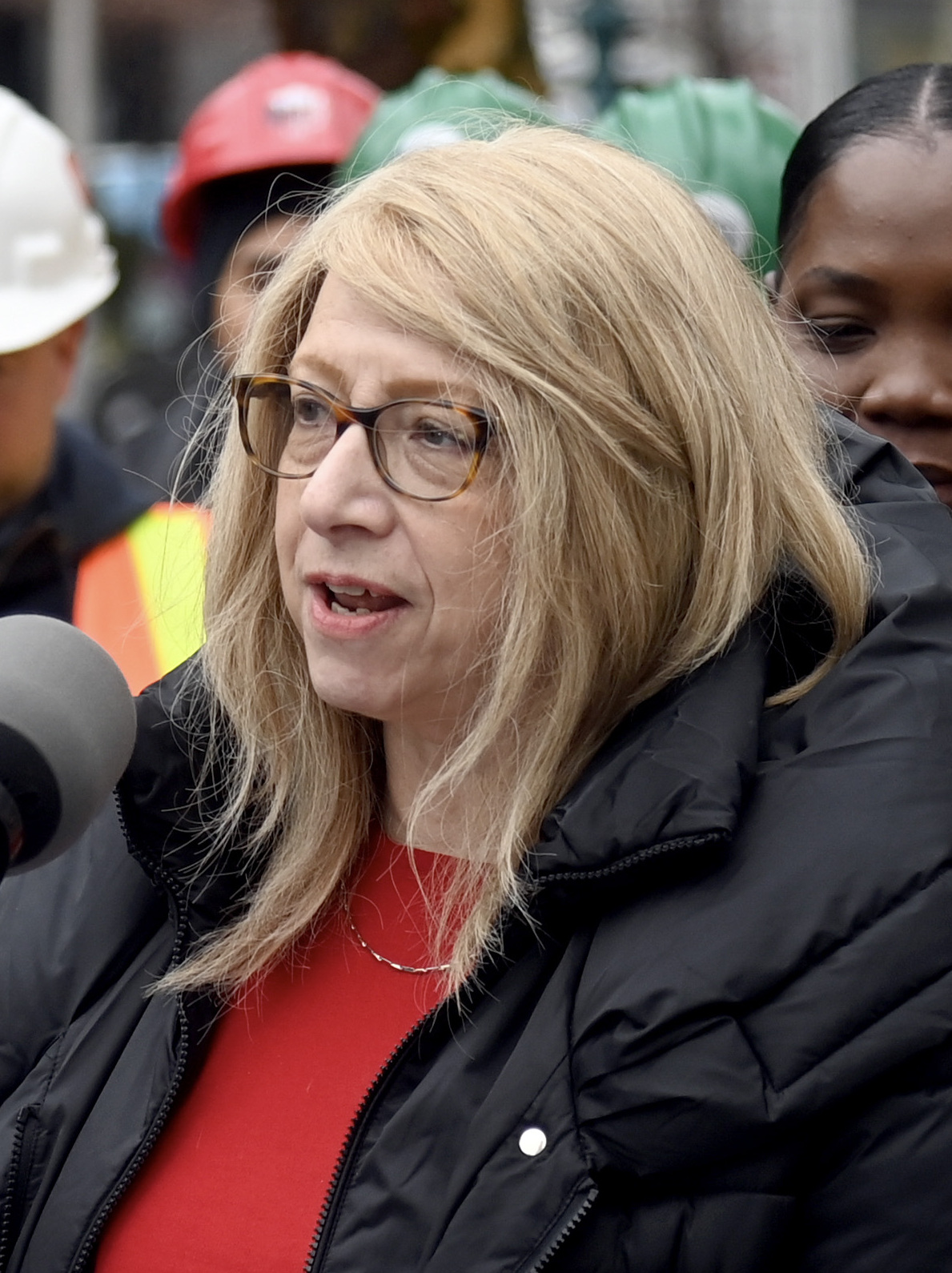
- Rosenthal in 2024

Member of the New York State Assembly from the 67th district
- Incumbent
- Assumed office February 28, 2006
- Preceded by: Scott Stringer

Personal details
- Born: November 12, 1957 (age 68) New York City, New York, U.S.
- Party: Democratic
- Education: University of Rochester (BA)
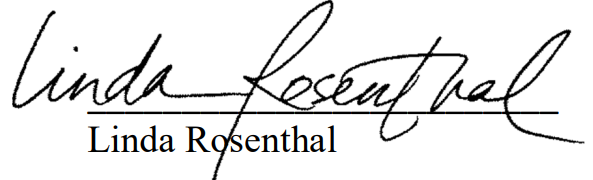
- Signature
- Website: State Assembly website

Linda B. Rosenthal (born November 12, 1957) represents District 67 as a Democrat in the New York State Assembly, which includes parts of Manhattan's Upper West Side and Clinton/Hell's Kitchen neighborhoods.

== Early life ==
Linda Rosenthal was born in 1957 to parents who fled the Nazis in the 1930s. Rosenthal earned a B.A. degree in history from the University of Rochester in 1980.

== Political career ==
In 1993, Rosenthal began working for US Congressman (for New York's 10th congressional district) Jerry Nadler and served as Manhattan District Director and Director of Special Projects. Prior to this, she worked in publishing.

=== New York State Assembly ===
Rosenthal was elected to the New York State Assembly in a February 2006 special election for District 67 between four candidates to replace Scott Stringer, who left the Assembly to become Manhattan Borough President. Rosenthal won the November 2008 general election with 84.7 percent of the vote, and ran uncontested in the November 2010 general election.

In May 2015, fellow Manhattan Democrat Richard N. Gottfried tried to curb a bill introduced by Rosenthal that would allow customers to bring their dogs to outdoor restaurants, because Gottfried was afraid larger breeds would be able to grab food from tabletops. Gottfried said: "Some dogs are tall enough that all they would have to do is turn their heads and they would be eating off people's plates." A similar bill that passed in California has not resulted in any problems, and the practice is also legal in Israel and some European countries, and common in Europe and in Los Angeles. The bill passed the Senate in May 2015 by a 60-0 vote. In March 2016, follows the State Legislature's passage of her bill, the New York City Department of Health and Mental Hygiene issued an advisory allowing dogs to accompany human diners at restaurants that have outdoor seating, joining service dogs which were already allowed in virtually all situations.

In March 2019, she introduced a bill, A5040, that will ban a sale of fur in New York, by 2021. New York would follow California, which is in the process of legislating the ban.

Also in 2019, New York passed Rosenthal's bill A1303B, the first statewide law to ban cat declawing in the United States. She worked closely with the nonprofit animal advocacy organization, The Paw Project, to pass the bill.

In 2022, Rosenthal was the Assembly sponsor of the Adult Survivors Act (the Senate sponsor was Brad Hoylman). The bill established a one-year "lookback period" that allowed adult victims of sex abuse to bring civil suits that were previously barred due to the statute of limitations. It unanimously passed the Senate in April 2022, passed the Assembly on a 140–3 vote in May 2022, and was signed into law by Governor Kathy Hochul.

In the Assembly, Rosenthal is the chair of the Housing Committee, and sits on the Codes, Health, and Agriculture committees. In 2023, she said of New York City housing shortage, "I’m really not worried about the supply of market-rate housing."

Rosenthal is a member of the Vote Blue Coalition, a progressive group and federal PAC created to support Democrats in New York, New Jersey, and Pennsylvania through voter outreach and mobilization efforts.

In 2024, Linda Rosenthal introduced a bill to ban e-cigarettes with video games installed in them.

In 2024, City & State NY named Rosenthal as number 14 on its “Power of Diversity” list of the 100 most influential women leaders in the state.

== Personal life ==
Rosenthal resides in a rent-controlled apartment on the Upper West Side of Manhattan. Although she shares a last name with former City Council member Helen Rosenthal who represented an overlapping district, they are not related.

== Election results ==
- February 2006 special election, NYS Assembly, 67th AD

| Linda B. Rosenthal (DEM – WOR) | ... | 5,694 |
| Charles A. Simon (WSP) | ... | 2,254 |
| Emily A. Csendes (REP) | ... | 875 |
| Michael Lupinacci (IND – NLP) | ... | 603 |

- November 2006 general election, NYS Assembly, 67th AD

| Linda B. Rosenthal (DEM – WOR) | ... | 33,909 |
| Theodore Howard (REP) | ... | 4,469 |

- November 2008 general election, NYS Assembly, 67th AD

| Linda B. Rosenthal (DEM – WOR) | ... | 46,780 |
| Eleanor Friedman (REP) | ... | 8,825 |

- November 2010 general election, NYS Assembly, 67th AD

| Linda B. Rosenthal (DEM – WOR) | ... | 32,283 |

- November 2012 general election, NYS Assembly, 67th AD

| Linda B. Rosenthal (DEM – WOR) | ... | 43,196 |
| Julia Willebrand (GRE) | ... | 2,298 |

- November 2014 general election, NYS Assembly, 67th AD

| Linda B. Rosenthal (DEM – WOR) | ... | 23,576 |

- September 2016 primary election, NYS Assembly, 67th AD

| Linda B. Rosenthal (DEM) | ... | 8,055 |
| Eugene G.P. Byrne (DEM) | ... | 295 |

- November 2016 general election, NYS Assembly, 67th AD

| Linda B. Rosenthal (DEM – WOR) | ... | 52,482 |
| Hyman Drusin (REP) | ... | 8,510 |

- November 2018 general election, NYS Assembly, 67th AD

| Linda B. Rosenthal (DEM – WOR) | ... | 49,768 |

- November 2020 general election, NYS Assembly, 67th AD

| Linda B. Rosenthal (DEM – WOR) | ... | 57,883 |

- November 2022 general election, NYS Assembly, 67th AD

| Linda B. Rosenthal (DEM – WOR) | ... | 40,824 |
