= New York's 75th State Assembly district =

American legislative district

Assemblymember
Tony Simone; D–Hell's Kitchen

New York's 75th State Assembly district is one of the 150 districts in the New York State Assembly. It has been represented by Tony Simone since 2023, succeeding 52-year former Assemblyman Richard Gottfried.

== Geography ==
District 75 is in Manhattan. The district includes Chelsea, Hell's Kitchen, Billionaires' Row, Midtown Manhattan and the Upper West Side. The Empire State Building, Madison Square Garden, Times Square, Rockefeller Center, Bryant Park, and the southern portion of Central Park are included in this district.

Prior to redistricting in 2022, the district included Murray Hill.

== Recent election results ==
=== 2026 ===
2026 New York State Assembly election, District 75
Primary election
Party	Candidate	Votes	%
Democratic	Tony Simone (incumbent)	10,230	76.8
Democratic	Emily Yuexin Miller	2,968	22.3
Write-in		126	0.9
Total votes		13,324	100.0
General election
Democratic	Tony Simone		
Working Families	Tony Simone		
Total	Tony Simone (incumbent)		
Republican	Cristina Fontanelli		
Save NYC	Cristina Fontanelli		
Total	Cristina Fontanelli		
Write-in			
Total votes			100.0

=== 2024 ===
2024 New York State Assembly election, District 75
Party	Candidate	Votes	%
Democratic	Tony Simone	39,750	
Working Families	Tony Simone	3,781	
Total	Tony Simone (incumbent)	43,531	99.1
Write-in		404	0.9
Total votes		43,935	100.0
Democratic hold			

=== 2022 ===
2022 New York State Assembly election, District 75
Primary election
Party	Candidate	Votes	%
Democratic	Tony Simone	4,072	38.8
Democratic	Layla Law-Gisiko	2,832	27.0
Democratic	Harrison Douglas Marks	1,946	18.6
Democratic	Christopher Lebron	1,390	13.3
Democratic	Lowell Kern	223	2.1
Write-in		26	0.2
Total votes		10,489	100.0
General election
Democratic	Tony Simone	30,036	82.1
Republican	Joseph Maffia	6,003	
Arts & Culture	Joseph Maffia	450	
Total	Joseph Maffia	6,453	17.7
Write-in		75	0.2
Total votes		36,564	100.0
Democratic hold			

=== 2020 ===
2020 New York State Assembly election, District 75
Party	Candidate	Votes	%
Democratic	Richard Gottfried	46,791	
Working Families	Richard Gottfried	6,782	
Total	Richard Gottfried (incumbent)	53,573	99.1
Write-in		470	0.9
Total votes		54,043	100.0
Democratic hold			

=== 2018 ===
2018 New York State Assembly election, District 75
Party	Candidate	Votes	%
Democratic	Richard Gottfried	40,462	
Working Families	Richard Gottfried	2,730	
Women's Equality	Richard Gottfried	612	
Total	Richard Gottfried (incumbent)	43,954	99.6
Write-in		178	0.4
Total votes		44,132	100.0
Democratic hold			

=== 2016 ===
2016 New York State Assembly election, District 75
Party	Candidate	Votes	%
Democratic	Richard Gottfried	43,648	
Working Families	Richard Gottfried	2,538	
Total	Richard Gottfried (incumbent)	46,186	84.4
Republican	Joseph Maffia	8,249	
Reform	Joseph Maffia	213	
Total	Joseph Maffia	8,462	15.5
Write-in		66	0.1
Total votes		54,714	100.0
Democratic hold			

=== 2014 ===
2014 New York State Assembly election, District 75
Party	Candidate	Votes	%
Democratic	Richard Gottfried	14,902	
Working Families	Richard Gottfried	3,469	
Total	Richard Gottfried (incumbent)	18,371	86.0
Republican	Harry Demell	2,964	13.9
Write-in		37	0.1
Total votes		21,372	100.0
Democratic hold			

=== 2012 ===
2012 New York State Assembly election, District 75
Party	Candidate	Votes	%
Democratic	Richard Gottfried	36,400	
Working Families	Richard Gottfried	2,362	
Total	Richard Gottfried (incumbent)	38,762	99.8
Write-in		94	0.2
Total votes		38,856	100.0
Democratic hold			

=== 2010 ===
2010 New York State Assembly election, District 75
Party	Candidate	Votes	%
Democratic	Richard Gottfried	23,069	
Working Families	Richard Gottfried	3,016	
Total	Richard Gottfried (incumbent)	26,085	81.5
Republican	Michael Chan	5,893	18.4
Write-in		26	0.1
Total votes		32,004	100.0
Democratic hold			

=== 2008 ===
2008 New York State Assembly election, District 75
Party	Candidate	Votes	%
Democratic	Richard Gottfried	41,357	
Working Families	Richard Gottfried	2,095	
Total	Richard Gottfried (incumbent)	43,452	82.3
Republican	Saul Farber	8,476	
Independence	Saul Farber	895	
Total	Saul Farber	9,371	17.7
Write-in		5	0.0
Total votes		52,828	100.0
Democratic hold			
