= Tony Simone =

American politician (born February 1970)

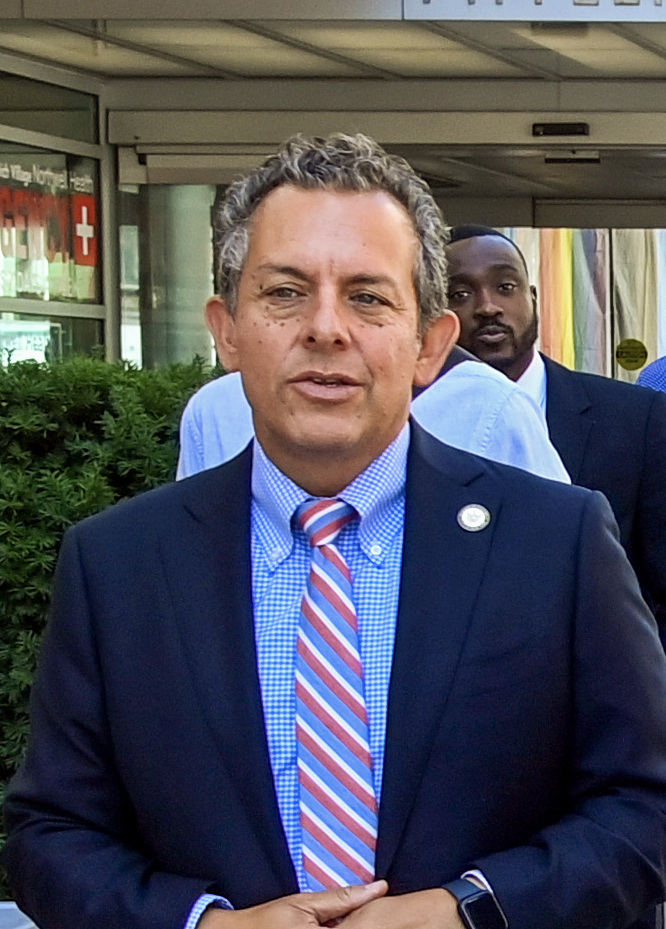
- Simone in 2024

Member of the New York State Assembly from the 75th district
- Incumbent
- Assumed office January 1, 2023
- Preceded by: Richard Gottfried

Personal details
- Born: 1970 (age 55–56) New York City, New York, U.S.
- Party: Democratic
- Education: Hofstra University (BA); Columbia University (MPA)
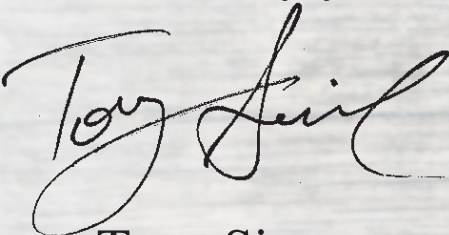
- Signature
- Website: Campaign website

Tony Simone (born Jan 1970) is an American politician serving as a member of the New York State Assembly for the 75th district which encompasses Chelsea, Midtown Manhattan, and parts of Hell's Kitchen. Elected in November 2022, he assumed office on January 1, 2023.

== Career ==
Simone has worked for former New York State Senator Catherine Abate, former New York State Comptroller Carl McCall, and former New York City Council Speaker Christine Quinn. He also served on Hillary Clinton’s 2000 U.S. Senate campaign and has worked at non-profits such as People for the American Way and Hudson River Park Friends. Simone was the Director of Community Outreach for the NYC Council where his work included coordinating relief efforts after Hurricane Sandy.

Simone won the Democratic nomination for the New York's 75th State Assembly District in June 2022 with 37.9% of the vote and defeated Republican challenger Joseph Maffia by nearly 70% in November 2022. He is the first openly-gay assembly member to represent New York's 75th State Assembly district.

Simone is a member of the Vote Blue Coalition, a progressive group and federal PAC created to support Democrats in New York, New Jersey, and Pennsylvania through voter outreach and mobilization efforts.

Simone cosponsored state legislation in late 2023 which requires all restaurants, beverage companies, and fast food companies in the State of New York to be open on Sundays and everyday of the week if they are located along transportation routes like The New York State Thruway funded by the government, located at rest stops, and receive a service contract. Chick-fil-A receives a service contract from the State that requires it to be open 7 days a week. But the company refuses to open all of its stores in New York State to the public on Sundays. Applegreen is Chick-fil-A's landlord.

== Elections ==
=== 2022 ===
New York State Assembly's 75th District 2022 General Election
Party	Candidate	Votes	%
Democratic	Tony Simone	27,576	82.3%
Republican	Joseph Maffia	5,947	17.7%
Total votes		33,523	91.87
Democratic hold			
