= Cristina Fontanelli =

American opera singer

Cristina Fontanelli (born in Brooklyn, New York) is an American actress, opera singer and television presenter.

== Early life ==
The Italian-American Fontanelli was born in Brooklyn, New York. She graduated from The American Academy of Dramatic Arts, and also attended The Juilliard School. In addition she has performed at many different venues and at public events, including at Feinstein's at the Regency, and the National Arts Club.

== Career ==
Fontanelli has appeared on stage with Joan Rivers, Joe Piscopo, Pat Cooper, and her friend the television host, Joe Franklin. She has sung with Boston Pops Orchestra with Richard Hayman conducting, Saint Louis Symphony Orchestra and performed at one of the 2005 presidential inaugural balls.

Called a "vocal genius" by The New York Sun, Fontanelli was awarded the OSIA Lifetime Achievement Award in the Arts (whose previous recipients include Luciano Pavarotti), and has been named "Woman of the Year" by Italian organizations throughout the United States.

Fontanelli has hosted a series of specials for PBS including "Andrea Bocelli Live from Central Park" and Il volo takes flight. in November 2010 Fontanelli appeared on the "CBS Weekend NY" show on which she sang O Sole Mio.

== Personal life ==
Fontanelli resides in New York City, New York.
