= New York's 67th State Assembly district =

American legislative district

Assemblymember
Linda Rosenthal; D–Upper West Side

New York's 67th State Assembly district is one of the 150 districts in the New York State Assembly. It has been represented by Democrat Linda Rosenthal since 2006, replacing Scott Stringer. Among the seat's prior occupants include Stringer and current U.S. Representative Jerry Nadler.

== Geography ==
=== 2000s-present ===
District 67 is located in Manhattan, comprising portions of the Upper West Side and Hell's Kitchen. Lincoln Center and a portion of Central Park is within this district.

The district is entirely within New York's 12th congressional district, and overlaps the 28th and 47th districts of the New York State Senate, and the 3rd, 6th, and 7th districts of the New York City Council.

=== 1990s-2000s ===
District 67 was located in Manhattan, and comprised most of the Upper West Side, with portions of Hell's Kitchen. The district's boundaries hugged most of the west coast of Manhattan to include portions of Chelsea and the Meatpacking District.

== Recent election results ==
=== 2026 ===
2026 New York State Assembly election, District 67
Party	Candidate	Votes	%
Democratic	Linda Rosenthal		
Working Families	Linda Rosenthal		
Total	Linda Rosenthal (incumbent)		
Write-in			
Total votes			100.0

=== 2024 ===
2024 New York State Assembly election, District 67
Party	Candidate	Votes	%
Democratic	Linda Rosenthal	48,227	
Working Families	Linda Rosenthal	4,012	
Total	Linda Rosenthal (incumbent)	52,239	98.8
Write-in		629	1.2
Total votes		52,868	100.0
Democratic hold			

=== 2022 ===
2022 New York State Assembly election, District 67
Party	Candidate	Votes	%
Democratic	Linda Rosenthal	36,947	
Working Families	Linda Rosenthal	3,877	
Total	Linda Rosenthal (incumbent)	40,824	98.8
Write-in		514	1.2
Total votes		41,338	100.0
Democratic hold			

=== 2020 ===
2020 New York State Assembly election, District 67
Party	Candidate	Votes	%
Democratic	Linda Rosenthal	50,887	
Working Families	Linda Rosenthal	6,996	
Total	Linda Rosenthal (incumbent)	57,883	96.2
Write-in	Adam Herbst	1,356	2.3
Write-in		915	1.5
Total votes		60,154	100.0
Democratic hold			

=== 2018 ===
2018 New York State Assembly election, District 67
Party	Candidate	Votes	%
Democratic	Linda Rosenthal	46,981	
Working Families	Linda Rosenthal	2,787	
Total	Linda Rosenthal (incumbent)	49,768	99.2
Write-in		390	0.8
Total votes		50,158	100.0
Democratic hold			

=== 2016 ===
2016 New York State Assembly election, District 67
Primary election
Party	Candidate	Votes	%
Democratic	Linda Rosenthal (incumbent)	8,055	96.0
Democratic	Eugene Byrne	295	3.5
Write-in		37	0.5
Total votes		8,387	100.0
General election
Democratic	Linda Rosenthal	50,070	
Working Families	Linda Rosenthal	2,412	
Total	Linda Rosenthal (incumbent)	52,482	86.0
Republican	Hyman Drusin	8,321	
Reform	Hyman Drusin	189	
Total	Hyman Drusin	8,510	13.9
Write-in		76	0.1
Total votes		61,068	100.0
Democratic hold			

=== 2014 ===
2014 New York State Assembly election, District 67
Party	Candidate	Votes	%
Democratic	Linda Rosenthal	19,768	
Working Families	Linda Rosenthal	3,808	
Total	Linda Rosenthal (incumbent)	23,576	99.5
Write-in		125	0.5
Total votes		23,697	100.0
Democratic hold			

=== 2012 ===
2012 New York State Assembly election, District 67
Party	Candidate	Votes	%
Democratic	Linda Rosenthal	41,199	
Working Families	Linda Rosenthal	1,993	
Total	Linda Rosenthal (incumbent)	43,192	94.8
Green	Julia Willebrand	2,298	5.0
Write-in		64	0.2
Total votes		45,554	100.0
Democratic hold			

=== 2010 ===
2010 New York State Assembly election, District 67
Party	Candidate	Votes	%
Democratic	Linda Rosenthal	28,712	
Working Families	Linda Rosenthal	3,571	
Total	Linda Rosenthal (incumbent)	32,283	99.8
Write-in		71	0.2
Total votes		32,354	100.0
Democratic hold			

=== 2008 ===
2008 New York State Assembly election, District 67
Party	Candidate	Votes	%
Democratic	Linda Rosenthal	44,522	
Working Families	Linda Rosenthal	2,241	
Total	Linda Rosenthal (incumbent)	46,763	84.1
Republican	Eleanor Friedman	8,820	15.9
Write-in		4	0.0
Total votes		55,587	100.0
Democratic hold			

=== 2006 general ===
2006 New York State Assembly election, District 67
Party	Candidate	Votes	%
Democratic	Linda Rosenthal	29,982	
Working Families	Linda Rosenthal	3,927	
Total	Linda Rosenthal (incumbent)	33,909	88.4
Republican	Theodore Howard	4,469	11.6
Write-in		0	0.0
Total votes		38,378	100.0
Democratic hold			

=== 2006 special ===
Incumbent Scott Stringer resigned on January 1, 2006 to serve as borough president of Manhattan, triggering a special election. In special elections for state legislative offices, primaries are usually not held – county committee members for each party select nominees.

2006 New York State Assembly special election, District 67
Party	Candidate	Votes	%
Democratic	Linda Rosenthal	5,027	
Working Families	Linda Rosenthal	667	
Total	Linda Rosenthal	5,694	60.0
West Side Progressive	Charles Simon	2,254	23.8
Republican	Emily Csendes	875	9.2
Independence	Michael Lupinacci	499	
New Leadership	Michael Lupinacci	104	
Total	Michael Lupinacci	603	6.4
Write-in	Tom Weiss	57	0.6
Write-in		3	0.0
Total votes		38,378	100.0
Democratic hold			

=== 2004 ===
2004 New York State Assembly election, District 67
Party	Candidate	Votes	%
Democratic	Scott Stringer	46,523	
Working Families	Scott Stringer	2,040	
Total	Scott Stringer (incumbent)	48,563	86.4
Republican	Adam Shun	8,212	
Independence	Adam Shun	606	
Total	Adam Shun	8,818	15.4
Write-in		0	0.0
Total votes		38,378	100.0
Democratic hold			

=== 2002 ===
2002 New York State Assembly election, District 67
Party	Candidate	Votes	%
Democratic	Scott Stringer	25,452	
Working Families	Scott Stringer	2,223	
Liberal	Scott Stringer	738	
Total	Scott Stringer (incumbent)	28,413	83.4
Republican	Frederick Cuttitta	4,852	
Conservative	Frederick Cuttitta	221	
Total	Frederick Cuttitta	5,073	14.9
Green	Thomas Siracuse	582	1.7
Write-in		0	0.0
Total votes		34,068	100.0
Democratic win (new boundaries)			

=== 2000 ===
2000 New York State Assembly election, District 67
Party	Candidate	Votes	%
Democratic	Scott Stringer	41,573	
Working Families	Scott Stringer	1,854	
Liberal	Scott Stringer	1,040	
Total	Scott Stringer (incumbent)	44,467	84.3
Republican	David Herz	7,939	
Independence	David Herz	358	
Total	David Herz	8,297	15.7
Write-in		1	0.0
Total votes		52,765	100.0
Democratic hold			
