= Richard N. Gottfried =

American attorney and politician

Richard Gottfried
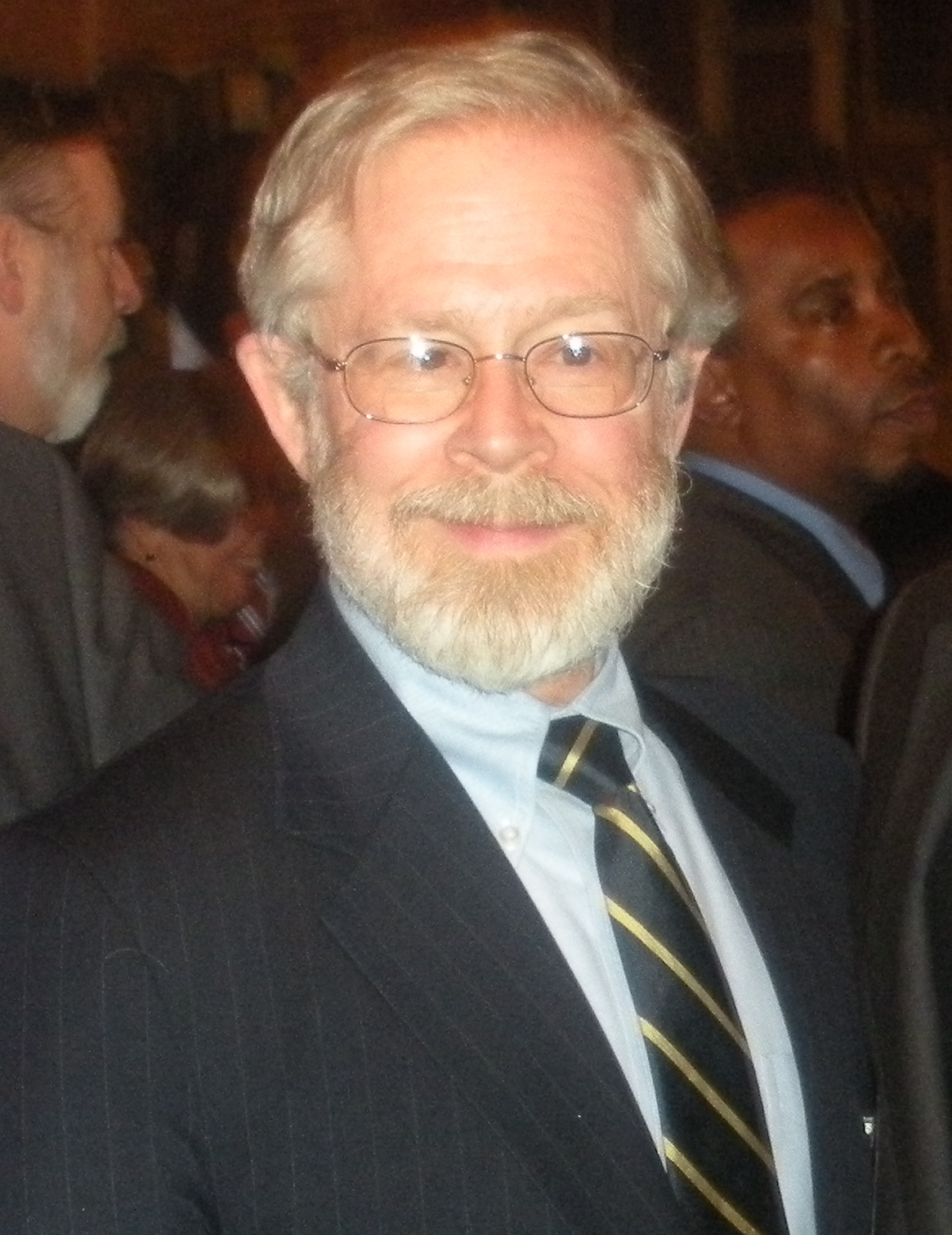

Member of the New York State Assembly
- In office January 1, 1971 – December 31, 2022
- Preceded by: Jerome Kretchmer
- Succeeded by: Tony Simone
- Constituency: 65th district (1971–1972); 67th district (1973–1982); 64th district (1983–2002); 75th district (2003–2022)

Personal details
- Born: May 16, 1947 (age 79) New York City, U.S.
- Party: Democratic
- Spouse: Louise Gottfried
- Education: Cornell University (BA); Columbia University (JD)
- Website: assembly.state.ny.us/mem/Richard-N-Gottfried

Richard N. Gottfried (born May 16, 1947) is an American attorney and politician who served as a member of the New York State Assembly representing portions of Manhattan. Gottfried had been a member of the Assembly for more than 50 years, making him the longest-serving member of the body and one of the longest-serving state legislators in the United States.

== Early life and education ==
Gottfried was born in New York City. He is a graduate of Stuyvesant High School, where he was a classmate of Jerrold Nadler and Dick Morris. Gottfried earned a Bachelor of Arts degree from Cornell University in 1968 and a Juris Doctor from Columbia Law School in 1973.

== Career ==
Richard Gottfried represents District 75 in the New York State Assembly, which includes Murray Hill, Chelsea, Clinton, portions of Midtown Manhattan and the Upper West Side. Gottfried is a progressive Democrat who has been endorsed by the Democratic and Working Families parties.

Elected to the Assembly in 1970, while a matriculating student at Columbia Law School, Gottfried served as chairman of the Assembly Committee on Health and was also a member of the Committees on Higher Education and Rules. He was also a member of the Assembly Steering Committee and the head of the Manhattan Assembly Delegation.

Some of his pieces of legislation-bills enacted into law that he has primary or secondary responsibility for include the creation of the Prenatal Care Assistance Program as well as the Child Health Plus and Family Health Plus programs. He is also the author of the Physician Profiling Law, which allows patients to access information about their primary care physician; the Family Health Care Decisions Act, which prioritizes who would make health care decisions for a person who does not have a health care proxy and is incapacitated; and the Health Care Proxy Law-which allows individuals to designate a secondary party to make critical health care decisions for them if they become incapacitated-as well as the HIV Testing and Confidentiality Law.

Gottfried was the sponsor of the 1998 Hudson River Park Law, which established that park, as well as the legislation to expand the Jacob Javits Convention Center. He was also instrumental in the enaction of the Omnibus Crime Act of 1978 and drafting of the 1976 Juvenile Justice Reform Act.

As chair of the Health Committee, and as a supporter of reproductive freedom, he seeks to keep New York pro-choice, and sponsored Gov. Spitzer's Reproductive Health and Privacy Protection Act.

Gottfried introduced the first same-sex marriage bill in the Assembly in 2003. When then-Governor Eliot Spitzer submitted it as a governor's program bill in 2007, Assembly Member Daniel O'Donnell, one of the Assembly's openly-gay members, became the lead sponsor. Marriage equality became law in New York State in June 2011.

Other bills he sponsors are: GENDA, the Gender Non-Discrimination Act which would make discrimination based on gender identity illegal; and a bill to legalize the use of medical marijuana, NY State Assembly Bill A6357E, which is now commonly referred to as the Compassionate Care Act.

As a leading advocate for patient autonomy, he has a major responsibility for New York's managed care reforms, and continues to sponsor legislation for stronger protections for consumers and health care providers, work toward public support for universal access to quality, affordable health care, and establish end-of-life and pain management protocols. Gottfried's New York Health Act, to establish universal, publicly funded health coverage, was the first of its kind to pass a legislative body (NYS Assembly, 1992).

During his time as a member of the Assembly Gottfried has served in various leadership capacities, including as Deputy Majority Leader, Assistant Majority Leader, Chairman of the Assembly Committee on Codes, and Children and Families, as well as Chairman of the Assembly Task Force on the Homeless, Campaign Finance Reform and Crime Victims. In his 2010 re-election bid he received 82% of the vote.

=== Retirement from NY State Assembly ===
On December 13, 2021, Gottfried, then the longest serving member of the New York State Assembly, announced he would not seek re-election in 2022 thus ending his tenure in the Assembly after a record 18,993 days in office.

=== Electoral history ===
New York State Assembly
Preceded by Jerome Kretchmer	New York State Assembly; 65th District; 1971–1972	Succeeded by Andrew Stein
Preceded by Albert H. Blumenthal	New York State Assembly; 67th District; 1973–1982	Succeeded by Jerrold Nadler
Preceded by William F. Passannante	New York State Assembly; 64th District; 1983–2002	Succeeded by Sheldon Silver
Preceded by Rubén Díaz, Jr.	New York State Assembly; 75th District; 2003–2022	Succeeded by Tony Simone
