= 2026 New York State Assembly election (districts 51–100) =

2026 New York Assembly election
- November 3, 2026

All 150 seats in the New York State Assembly 76 seats needed for a majority
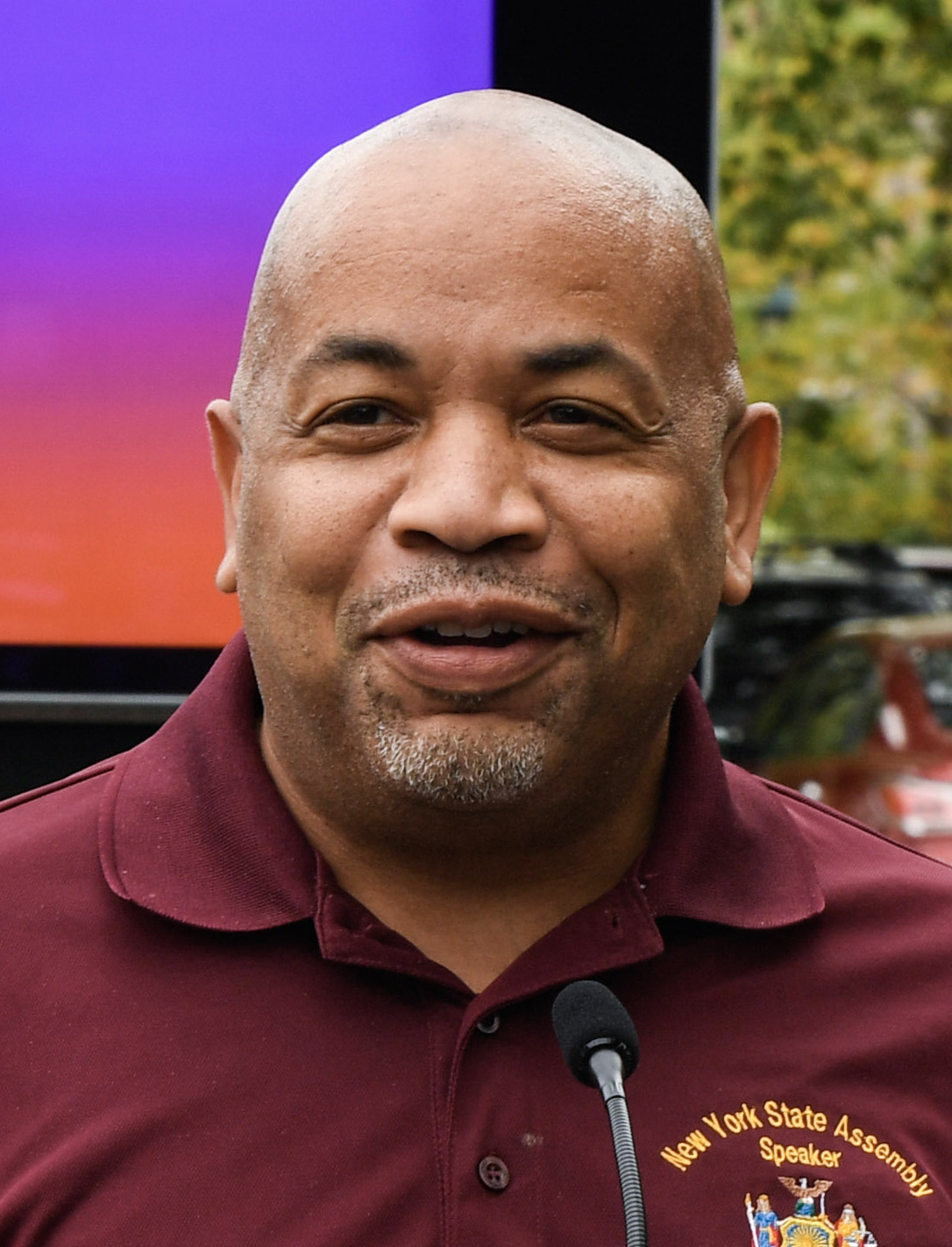

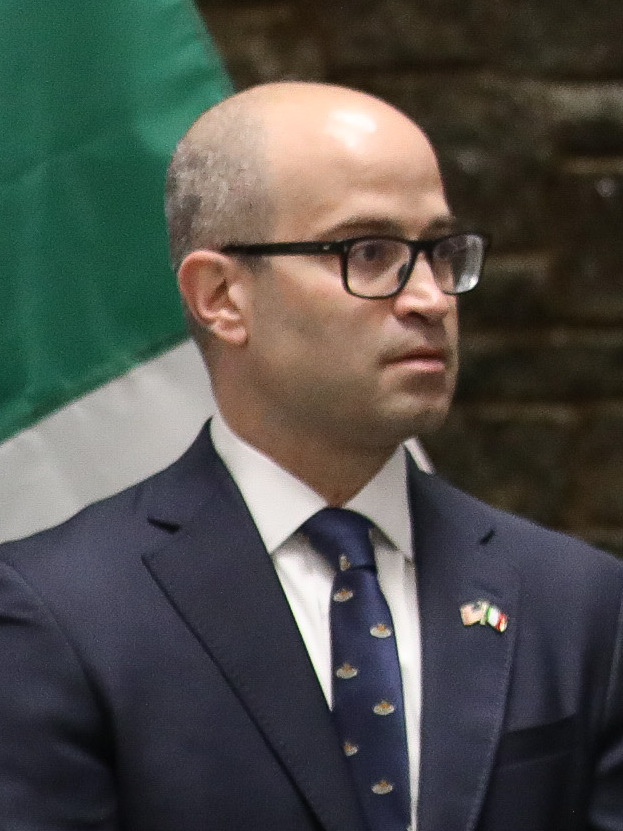
Leader	Carl Heastie	Ed Ra
Party	Democratic	Republican
Leader since	February 3, 2015	February 9, 2026
Leader's seat	83rd district	19th district
Last election	103 seats, 54.6%	47 seats, 37.0%
Current seats	103 seats	47 seats
Seats needed	Steady	▲29
- Democratic incumbent Democratic incumbent retiring or lost renomination Republican incumbent Republican incumbent retiring
Incumbent Speaker
Carl Heastie
Democratic

The 2026 New York State Assembly election was held on November 3, 2026. Primary elections were held on June 23, 2026. The Democratic Party has held a majority in the New York State Assembly since 1975. It was held alongside elections for governor, attorney general, comptroller, United States House of Representatives, and State Senate.

Candidates were required to file paperwork between March 30 and April 2, 2026, to run.

== District 51 ==
2026 New York's 51st State Assembly district election
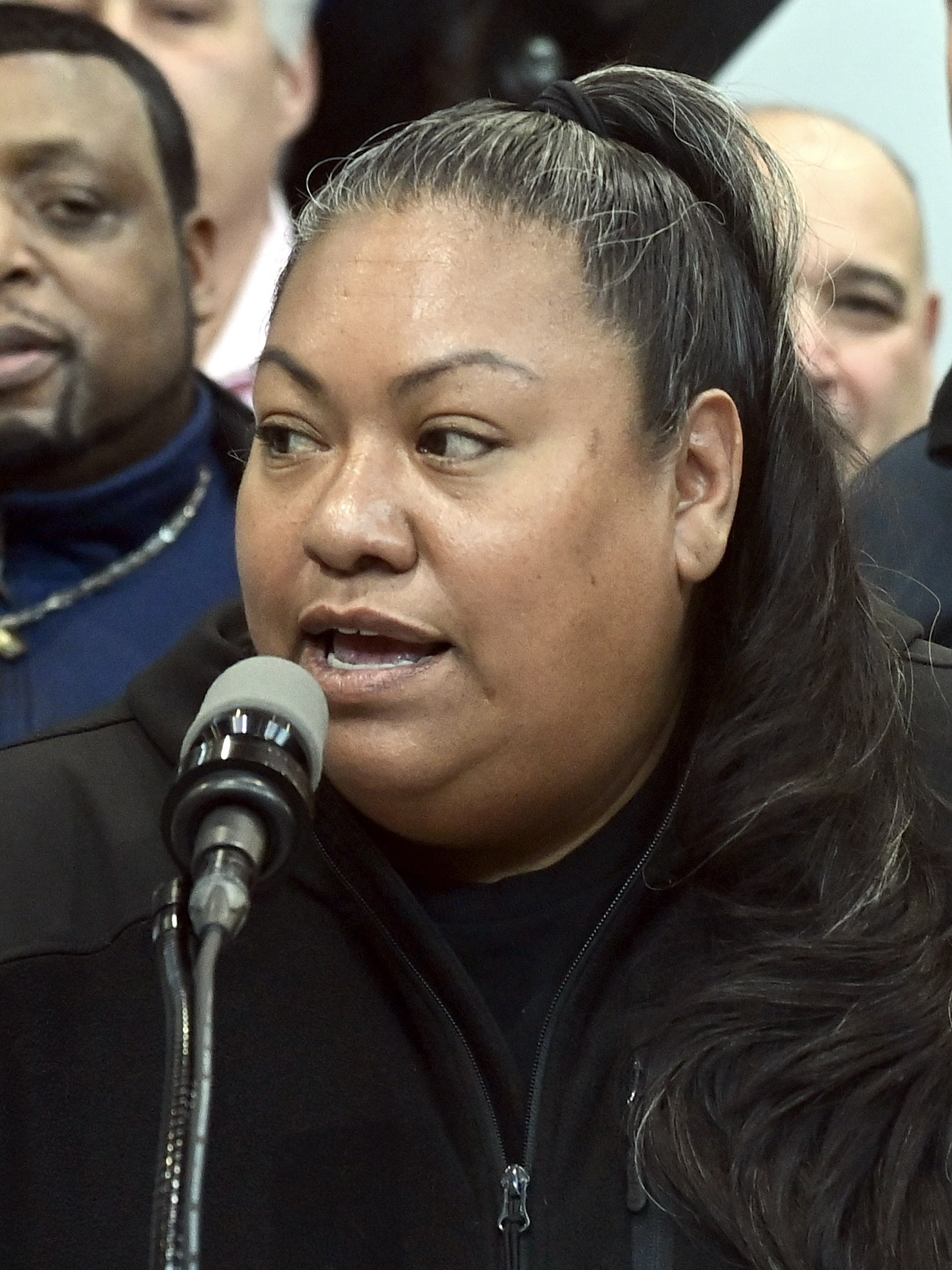

Nominee	Marcela Mitaynes	Carla Danielson
Party	Democratic	Republican
Alliance	Working Families	Conservative
Incumbent Assemblymember
Marcela Mitaynes
Democratic

The 51st district is located entirely within Brooklyn in New York City, including parts of the community board districts of Community Board 6, Community Board 7, Community Board 10, and Community Board 12. The incumbent is Democrat Marcela Mitaynes, who defeated Republican Erik S. Frankel to win a third term with 76.81% of the vote in 2024.

=== Democratic primary ===
==== Nominee ====
- Marcela Mitaynes, incumbent assemblymember

==== Endorsements ====
Marcela Mitaynes

Organizations

- Sunrise Movement

Political parties

- New York Working Families Party

=== Republican primary ===
==== Nominee ====
- Carla Danielson

=== Third parties and independents ===
==== Declared ====
- Carla Danielson (Conservative)
- Marcela Mitaynes (Working Families), incumbent assemblymember

=== General election ===
==== Predictions ====
Source	Ranking	As of
State Navigate	Solid D	November 2, 2026

==== Fundraising ====
Campaign finance reports as of October 19, 2026
Candidate	Contributions	Loans	Expenditures
Marcela Mitaynes (D)	$18,960.00	$0.00	$11,850.12
Carla Danielson (R)	$0.00	$0.00	$0.00
Source: Transparency USA

==== Results ====
2026 New York's 51st State Assembly district election
Party	Candidate	Votes	%	±%
Democratic	Marcela Mitaynes			
Working Families	Marcela Mitaynes			
Total	Marcela Mitaynes (incumbent)			
Republican	Carla Danielson			
Conservative	Carla Danielson			
Total	Carla Danielson			
Write-in				
Total votes				

== District 52 ==
2026 New York's 52nd State Assembly district election
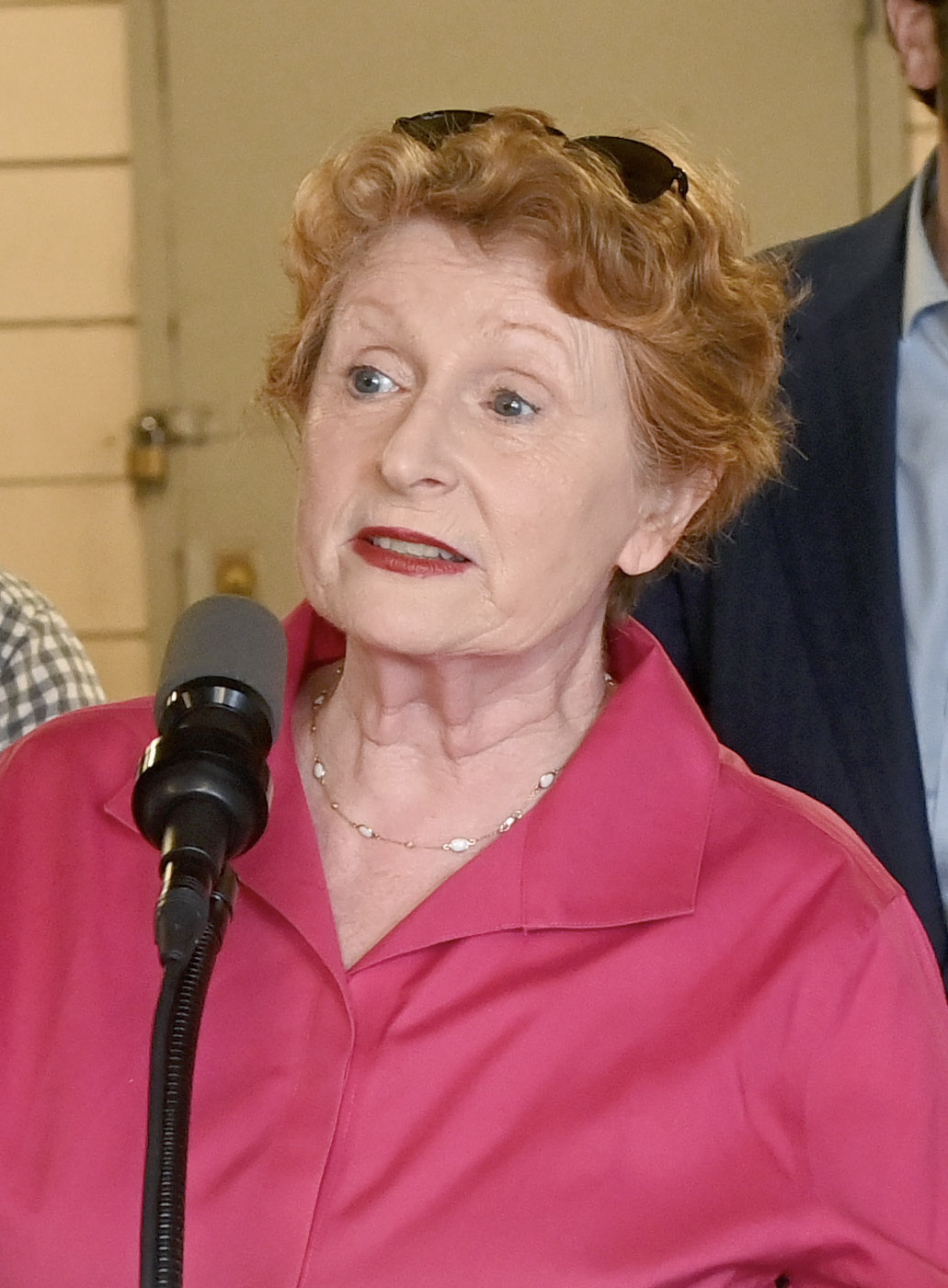

Nominee	Jo Anne Simon	Brett E. Wynkoop
Party	Democratic	Republican
Alliance	Working Families	Conservative
Incumbent Assemblymember
Jo Anne Simon
Democratic

The 52nd district is located entirely within Brooklyn in New York City, including parts of the community board districts of Community Board 1, Community Board 2, Community Board 6, and Community Board 8. The incumbent is Democrat Jo Anne Simon, who defeated Conservative Brett E. Wynkoop to win a sixth term with 93.88% of the vote in 2024.

=== Democratic primary ===
==== Nominee ====
- Jo Anne Simon, incumbent assemblymember

==== Eliminated in primary ====
- Lydia Bella Green, district leader

==== Endorsements ====
Jo Anne Simon

Labor unions

- New York State United Teachers
- United Auto Workers Region 9A

Organizations

- Stonewall Democratic Club of New York City

Political parties

- New York Working Families Party
Lydia Bella Green

Organizations

- Run for Something

==== Fundraising ====
Campaign finance reports as of October 19, 2026
Candidate	Contributions	Loans	Expenditures
Jo Anne Simon (D)	$395,599.07	$0.00	$351,692.62
Lydia Bella Green (D)	$160,650.51	$0.00	$132,612.55
Source: Transparency USA

==== Results ====
2026 New York's 52nd State Assembly district Democratic primary election
Party	Candidate	Votes	%
Democratic	Jo Anne Simon (incumbent)	18,259	71.00%
Democratic	Lydia Bella Green	7,333	28.52%
Write-in		124	0.48%
Total votes		25,716	100.00%

=== Republican primary ===
==== Nominee ====
- Brett E. Wynkoop, Oath Keeper and perennial candidate

=== Third parties and independents ===
==== Declared ====
- Brett E. Wynkoop (Conservative), Oath Keeper and perennial candidate
- Jo Anne Simon (Working Families), incumbent assemblymember

=== General election ===
==== Predictions ====
Source	Ranking	As of
State Navigate	Solid D	November 2, 2026

==== Fundraising ====
Campaign finance reports as of October 19, 2026
Candidate	Contributions	Loans	Expenditures
Jo Anne Simon (D)	$395,599.07	$0.00	$351,692.62
Brett E. Wynkoop (R)	$0.00	$0.00	$0.00
Source: Transparency USA

==== Results ====
2026 New York's 52nd State Assembly district election
Party	Candidate	Votes	%	±%
Democratic	Jo Anne Simon			
Working Families	Jo Anne Simon			
Total	Jo Anne Simon (incumbent)			
Republican	Brett E. Wynkoop			
Conservative	Brett E. Wynkoop			
Total	Brett E. Wynkoop			
Write-in				
Total votes				

== District 53 ==
2026 New York's 53rd State Assembly district election
Nominee	Maritza Davila
Party	Democratic
Incumbent Assemblymember
Maritza Davila
Democratic

The 53rd district is located entirely within Brooklyn in New York City, including parts of the community board districts of Community Board 1 and Community Board 4. The incumbent is Democrat Maritza Davila, who ran unopposed to win a sixth full term with 99.27% of the vote in 2024.

=== Democratic primary ===
==== Nominee ====
- Maritza Davila, incumbent assemblymember

=== General election ===
==== Predictions ====
Source	Ranking	As of
State Navigate	Solid D	November 2, 2026

==== Fundraising ====
Campaign finance reports as of October 19, 2026
Candidate	Contributions	Loans	Expenditures
Maritza Davila (D)	$13,400.00	$0.00	$7,127.79
Source: Transparency USA

==== Results ====
2026 New York's 53rd State Assembly district election
Party	Candidate	Votes	%	±%
Democratic	Maritza Davila (incumbent)			
Write-in				
Total votes				

== District 54 ==
2026 New York's 54th State Assembly district election
Nominee	Christian Celeste Tate
Party	Democratic
Alliance	Working Families
Incumbent Assemblymember
Erik Martin Dilan
Democratic

The 54th district is located entirely within Brooklyn in New York City, including parts of the community board districts of Community Board 4 and Community Board 5. The incumbent is Democrat Erik Martin Dilan, who ran unopposed to win a sixth term with 98.75% of the vote in 2024.

=== Democratic primary ===
==== Nominee ====
- Christian Celeste Tate, field lead for Zohran Mamdani

==== Eliminated in primary ====
- Erik Martin Dilan, incumbent assemblymember

==== Disqualified ====
- Paperboy Prince, artist and perennial candidate

==== Endorsements ====
Christian Celeste Tate

U.S. senators

- Bernie Sanders, Vermont (2007–present) (Independent)

U.S. representatives

- Alexandria Ocasio-Cortez, NY-14 (2019–present)

Organizations

- Citizen Action of New York
- DRUM Beats
- New York City Democratic Socialists of America
- Our Revolution
- Run for Something
- Stonewall Democratic Club of New York City

Political parties

- New York Working Families Party
Erik Martin Dilan

Labor unions

- 1199SEIU
- District Council 37
- Hotel and Gaming Trades Council
- New York State United Teachers

==== Fundraising ====
Italics indicate a disqualified candidate.

Campaign finance reports as of October 19, 2026
Candidate	Contributions	Loans	Expenditures
Christian Celeste Tate (D)	$283,562.39	$0.00	$264,444.91
Erik Martin Dilan (D)	$405,368.46	$0.00	$387,937.91
Paperboy Prince	$30.00	$0.00	$0.00
Source: Transparency USA

==== Results ====
2026 New York's 54th State Assembly district Democratic primary election
Party	Candidate	Votes	%
Democratic	Christian Celeste Tate	4,192	62.03%
Democratic	Erik Martin Dilan (incumbent)	2,550	37.73%
Write-in		16	0.24%
Total votes		6,758	100.00%

=== Third parties and independents ===
==== Declared ====
- Christian Celeste Tate (Working Families), field lead for Zohran Mamdani

=== General election ===
==== Predictions ====
Source	Ranking	As of
State Navigate	Uncontested D	November 2, 2026

==== Fundraising ====
Campaign finance reports as of October 19, 2026
Candidate	Contributions	Loans	Expenditures
Christian Celeste Tate (D)	$283,562.39	$0.00	$264,444.91
Source: Transparency USA

==== Results ====
2026 New York's 54th State Assembly district election
Party	Candidate	Votes	%	±%
Democratic	Christian Celeste Tate			
Working Families	Christian Celeste Tate			
Total	Christian Celeste Tate			
Write-in				
Total votes				

== District 55 ==
2026 New York's 55th State Assembly district election
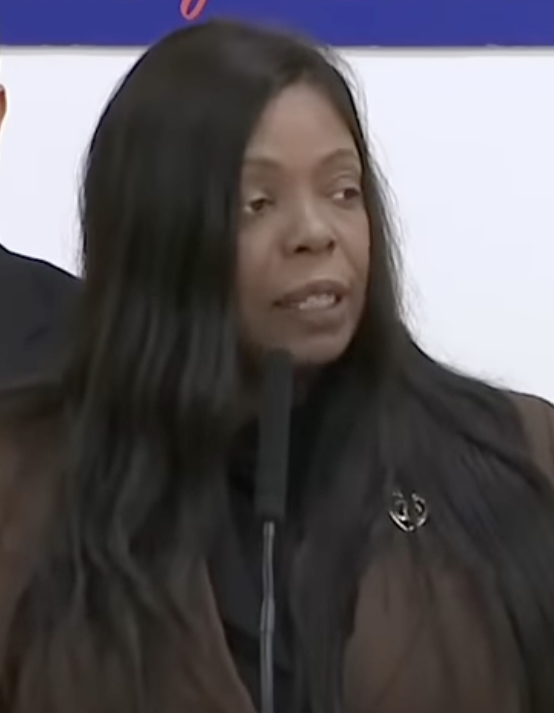
Nominee	Latrice Walker
Party	Democratic
Alliance	Working Families
Incumbent Assemblymember
Latrice Walker
Democratic

The 55th district is located entirely within Brooklyn in New York City, including parts of the community board districts of Community Board 3, Community Board 5, Community Board 8, and Community Board 9. The incumbent is Democrat Latrice Walker, who defeated Republican Berneda W. Jackson to win a sixth term with 91.54% of the vote in 2024.

=== Democratic primary ===
==== Nominee ====
- Latrice Walker, incumbent assemblymember

==== Endorsements ====
Latrice Walker

Organizations

- Stonewall Democrats

Political parties

- New York Working Families Party

=== Republican primary ===
==== Disqualified ====
- Yahemia Harris

=== Third parties and independents ===
==== Declared ====
- Latrice Walker (Working Families), incumbent assemblymember

==== Disqualified ====
- Yahemia Harris (No Kings)

=== General election ===
==== Predictions ====
Source	Ranking	As of
State Navigate	Solid D	November 2, 2026

==== Fundraising ====
Italics indicate a disqualified candidate.

Campaign finance reports as of October 19, 2026
Candidate	Contributions	Loans	Expenditures
Latrice Walker (D)	$3,260.00	$0.00	$15,698.20
Yahemia Harris	$0.00	$0.00	$0.00
Source: Transparency USA

==== Results ====
2026 New York's 55th State Assembly district election
Party	Candidate	Votes	%	±%
Democratic	Latrice Walker			
Working Families	Latrice Walker			
Total	Latrice Walker (incumbent)			
Write-in				
Total votes				

== District 56 ==
2026 New York's 56th State Assembly district election
Nominee	Eon Tyrell Huntley
Party	Democratic
Alliance	Working Families
Incumbent Assemblymember
Stefani Zinerman
Democratic

The 56th district is located entirely within Brooklyn in New York City, including parts of the community board districts of Community Board 3 and Community Board 8. The incumbent is Democrat Stefani Zinerman, who ran unopposed to win a third term with 99.03% of the vote in 2024.

=== Democratic primary ===
==== Nominee ====
- Eon Tyrell Huntley, candidate for this district in 2024

==== Eliminated in primary ====
- Michael Bailey
- Stefani Zinerman, incumbent assemblymember

==== Endorsements ====
Eon Tyrell Huntley

U.S. senators

- Bernie Sanders, Vermont (2007–present) (Independent)

U.S. representatives

- Alexandria Ocasio-Cortez, NY-14 (2019–present)
- Jamaal Bowman, NY-16 (2021–2025)

State legislators

- Jabari Brisport, state senator from the 25th district (2021–present)

Local officials

- Chi Ossé, New York City councilmember from the 36th district (2022–present)

Labor unions

- United Auto Workers Region 9A

Organizations

- New York City Democratic Socialists of America
- Stonewall Democrats
- Sunrise Movement

Political parties

- New York Working Families Party
Stefani Zinerman

Labor unions

- New York State United Teachers

==== Fundraising ====
Campaign finance reports as of October 19, 2026
Candidate	Contributions	Loans	Expenditures
Eon Tyrell Huntley (D)	$332,677.56	$0.00	$332,259.28
Stefani Zinerman (D)	$304,707.42	$0.00	$316,879.73
Michael Bailey (D)	$7,228.22	$0.00	$6,950.72
Source: Transparency USA

==== Results ====
2026 New York's 56th State Assembly district Democratic primary election
Party	Candidate	Votes	%
Democratic	Eon Tyrell Huntley	9,004	58.40%
Democratic	Stefani Zinerman (incumbent)	5,627	36.50%
Democratic	Michael Bailey	764	4.96%
Write-in		23	0.15%
Total votes		15,418	100.00%

=== Third parties and independents ===
==== Declared ====
- Eon Tyrell Huntley (Working Families), Democratic candidate for this district in 2024

=== General election ===
==== Predictions ====
Source	Ranking	As of
State Navigate	Uncontested D	November 2, 2026

==== Fundraising ====
Campaign finance reports as of October 19, 2026
Candidate	Contributions	Loans	Expenditures
Eon Tyrell Huntley (D)	$332,677.56	$0.00	$332,259.28
Source: Transparency USA

==== Results ====
2026 New York's 56th State Assembly district election
Party	Candidate	Votes	%	±%
Democratic	Eon Tyrell Huntley			
Working Families	Eon Tyrell Huntley			
Total	Eon Tyrell Huntley			
Write-in				
Total votes				

== District 57 ==
2026 New York's 57th State Assembly district election
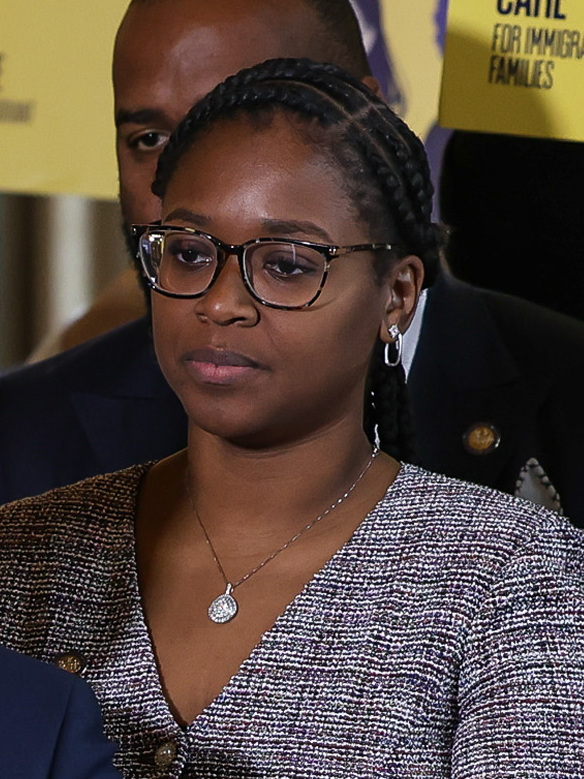

Nominee	Phara Souffrant Forrest	Yolanda Allison
Party	Democratic	Republican
Alliance	Working Families
Incumbent Assemblymember
Phara Souffrant Forrest
Democratic

The 57th district is located entirely within Brooklyn in New York City, including parts of the community board districts of Community Board 2, Community Board 3, Community Board 8, and Community Board 9. The incumbent is Democrat Phara Souffrant Forrest, who ran unopposed to win a third term with 99.34% of the vote in 2024.

=== Democratic primary ===
==== Nominee ====
- Phara Souffrant Forrest, incumbent assemblymember

==== Eliminated in primary ====
- Samantha N. Johnson, community liaison for Nydia Velázquez

==== Endorsements ====
Phara Souffrant Forrest

Labor unions

- New York State United Teachers
- United Auto Workers Region 9A

Organizations

- Stonewall Democrats
- Sunrise Movement

Political parties

- New York Working Families Party

==== Fundraising ====
Campaign finance reports as of October 19, 2026
Candidate	Contributions	Loans	Expenditures
Phara Souffrant Forrest (D)	$178,027.40	$0.00	$127,895.02
Samantha N. Johnson (D)	$11,856.61	$0.00	$11,298.45
Source: Transparency USA

==== Results ====
2026 New York's 57th State Assembly district Democratic primary election
Party	Candidate	Votes	%
Democratic	Phara Souffrant Forrest (incumbent)	12,866	78.51%
Democratic	Samantha N. Johnson	3,386	20.66%
Write-in		135	0.82%
Total votes		16,387	100.00%

=== Republican primary ===
==== Nominee ====
- Yolanda Allison

==== Disqualified ====
- Victor V. Best

==== Fundraising ====
Italics indicate a disqualified candidate.

Campaign finance reports as of October 19, 2026
Candidate	Contributions	Loans	Expenditures
Yolanda Allison (R)	$0.00	$0.00	$0.00
Victor V. Best	$0.00	$0.00	$0.00
Source: Transparency USA

=== Third parties and independents ===
==== Declared ====
- Phara Souffrant Forrest (Working Families), incumbent assemblymember

=== General election ===
==== Predictions ====
Source	Ranking	As of
State Navigate	Solid D	November 2, 2026

==== Fundraising ====
Campaign finance reports as of October 19, 2026
Candidate	Contributions	Loans	Expenditures
Phara Souffrant Forrest (D)	$178,027.40	$0.00	$127,895.02
Yolanda Allison (R)	$0.00	$0.00	$0.00
Source: Transparency USA

==== Results ====
2026 New York's 57th State Assembly district election
Party	Candidate	Votes	%	±%
Democratic	Phara Souffrant Forrest			
Working Families	Phara Souffrant Forrest			
Total	Phara Souffrant Forrest (incumbent)			
Republican	Yolanda Allison			
Write-in				
Total votes				

== District 58 ==
2026 New York's 58th State Assembly district election
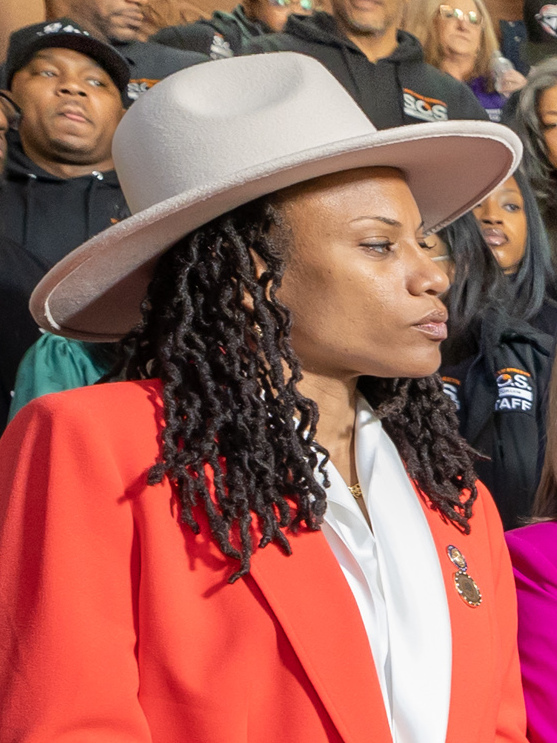
Nominee	Monique Chandler-Waterman
Party	Democratic
Alliance	Working Families
Incumbent Assemblymember
Monique Chandler-Waterman
Democratic

The 58th district is located entirely within Brooklyn in New York City, including parts of the community board districts of Community Board 9, Community Board 16, Community Board 17, and Community Board 18. The incumbent is Democrat Monique Chandler-Waterman, who ran unopposed to win a second full term with 99.8% of the vote in 2024.

=== Democratic primary ===
==== Nominee ====
- Monique Chandler-Waterman, incumbent assemblymember

==== Endorsements ====
Monique Chandler-Waterman

Political parties

- New York Working Families Party

=== Third parties and independents ===
==== Declared ====
- Monique Chandler-Waterman (Working Families), incumbent assemblymember

=== General election ===
==== Predictions ====
Source	Ranking	As of
State Navigate	Uncontested D	November 2, 2026

==== Fundraising ====
Campaign finance reports as of October 19, 2026
Candidate	Contributions	Loans	Expenditures
Monique Chandler-Waterman (D)	$91,078.37	$0.00	$55,761.97
Source: Transparency USA

==== Results ====
2026 New York's 58th State Assembly district election
Party	Candidate	Votes	%	±%
Democratic	Monique Chandler-Waterman			
Working Families	Monique Chandler-Waterman			
Total	Monique Chandler-Waterman (incumbent)			
Write-in				
Total votes				

== District 59 ==
2026 New York's 59th State Assembly district election
Nominee	Jaime Williams	Jibreel Jalloh
Party	Democratic	Working Families
Alliance	Conservative
Incumbent Assemblymember
Jaime Williams
Democratic

The 59th district is located entirely within Brooklyn in New York City, including parts of the community board districts of Community Board 15 and Community Board 18. The incumbent is Democrat Jaime Williams, who ran unopposed to win a fifth full term with 99.54% of the vote in 2024.

=== Democratic primary ===
==== Nominee ====
- Jaime Williams, incumbent assemblymember

==== Eliminated in primary ====
- Jibreel Jalloh, community organizer

==== Endorsements ====
Jibreel Jalloh

Labor unions

- District Council 37

Political parties

- New York Working Families Party

==== Fundraising ====
Campaign finance reports as of October 19, 2026
Candidate	Contributions	Loans	Expenditures
Jaime Williams (D)	$357,282.14	$0.00	$430,303.49
Jibreel Jalloh (D)	$260,339.60	$0.00	$257,597.98
Source: Transparency USA

==== Results ====
2026 New York's 59th State Assembly district Democratic primary election
Party	Candidate	Votes	%
Democratic	Jaime Williams (incumbent)	4,277	65.99%
Democratic	Jibreel Jalloh	2,189	33.78%
Write-in		15	0.23%
Total votes		6,481	100.00%

=== Republican primary ===
==== Disqualified ====
- Sandra Gilmour

=== Third parties and independents ===
==== Declared ====
- Jaime Williams (Conservative), incumbent assemblymember
- Jibreel Jalloh (Working Families), community organizer

=== General election ===
==== Predictions ====
Source	Ranking	As of
State Navigate	Solid D	November 2, 2026

==== Fundraising ====
Campaign finance reports as of October 19, 2026
Candidate	Contributions	Loans	Expenditures
Jaime Williams (D)	$357,282.14	$0.00	$430,303.49
Jibreel Jalloh (WF)	$260,339.60	$0.00	$257,597.98
Sandra Gilmour	$0.00	$0.00	$0.00
Source: Transparency USA

==== Results ====
2026 New York's 59th State Assembly district election
Party	Candidate	Votes	%	±%
Democratic	Jaime Williams			
Conservative	Jaime Williams			
Total	Jaime Williams (incumbent)			
Working Families	Jibreel Jalloh			
Write-in				
Total votes				

== District 60 ==
2026 New York's 60th State Assembly district election
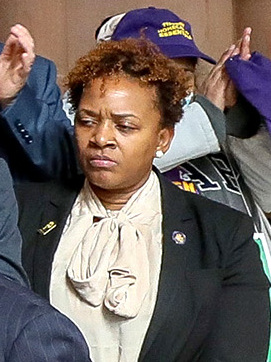

Nominee	Nikki Lucas	Norman H. Ramsay
Party	Democratic	Republican
Alliance		Conservative
Incumbent Assemblymember
Nikki Lucas
Democratic

The 60th district is located entirely within Brooklyn in New York City, including parts of the community board districts of Community Board 5, Community Board 16, and Community Board 18. The incumbent is Democrat Nikki Lucas, who ran unopposed to win a second full term with 99.65% of the vote in 2024.

=== Democratic primary ===
==== Nominee ====
- Nikki Lucas, incumbent assemblymember

=== Republican primary ===
==== Nominee ====
- Norman H. Ramsay

=== Third parties and independents ===
==== Declared ====
- Norman H. Ramsay (Conservative)

=== General election ===
==== Predictions ====
Source	Ranking	As of
State Navigate	Solid D	November 2, 2026

==== Fundraising ====
Campaign finance reports as of October 19, 2026
Candidate	Contributions	Loans	Expenditures
Nikki Lucas (D)	$57,468.23	$0.00	$54,960.48
Norman H. Ramsay (R)	$50,830.00	$0.00	$13,084.01
Source: Transparency USA

==== Results ====
2026 New York's 60th State Assembly district election
Party	Candidate	Votes	%	±%
Democratic	Nikki Lucas (incumbent)			
Republican	Norman H. Ramsay			
Conservative	Norman H. Ramsay			
Total	Norman H. Ramsay			
Write-in				
Total votes				

== District 61 ==
2026 New York's 61st State Assembly district election
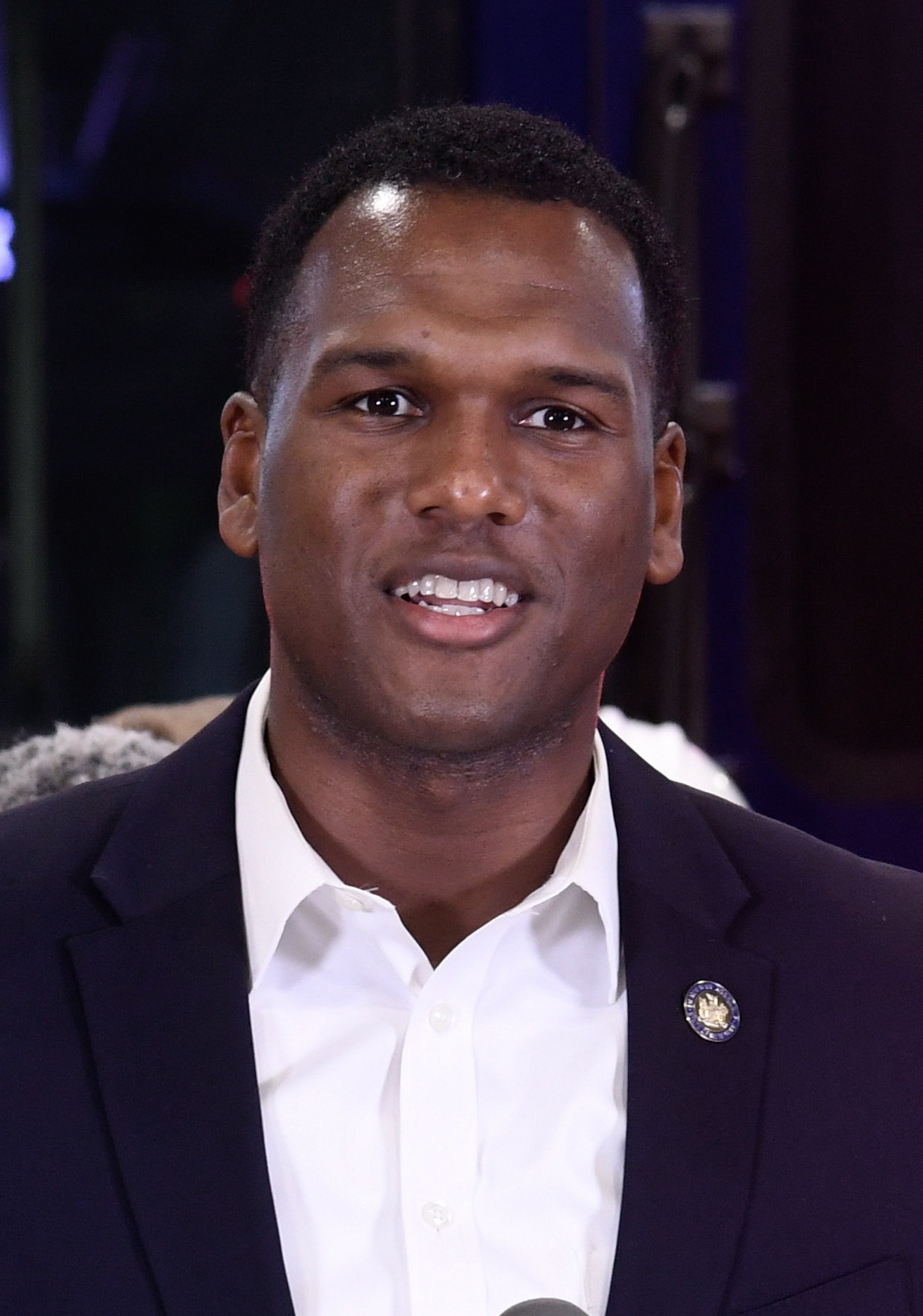

Nominee	Charles Fall	Casey Marie O'Connor-Manasia
Party	Democratic	Republican
Incumbent Assemblymember
Charles Fall
Democratic

The 61st district is located within New York City, including parts of the community board districts of Community Board 2, Community Board 6, Community Board 7, and Community Board 10 in Brooklyn, parts of the community board district of Community Board 1 in Manhattan, and parts of the community board district of Community Board 1 in Staten Island. The incumbent is Democrat Charles Fall, who ran unopposed to win a fourth term with 97.85% of the vote in 2024.

=== Democratic primary ===
==== Nominee ====
- Charles Fall, incumbent assemblymember

=== Republican primary ===
==== Nominee ====
- Casey Marie O'Connor-Manasia, business owner

=== Third parties and independents ===
==== Disqualified ====
- Casey Marie O'Connor-Manasia (Conservative), business owner

=== General election ===
==== Predictions ====
Source	Ranking	As of
State Navigate	Solid D	November 2, 2026

==== Fundraising ====
Campaign finance reports as of October 19, 2026
Candidate	Contributions	Loans	Expenditures
Charles Fall (D)	$285,139.21	$0.00	$336,140.29
Casey Marie O'Connor-Manasia (R)	$12,713.32	$0.00	$7,696.41
Source: Transparency USA

==== Results ====
2026 New York's 61st State Assembly district election
Party	Candidate	Votes	%	±%
Democratic	Charles Fall (incumbent)			
Republican	Casey Marie O'Connor-Manasia			
Write-in				
Total votes				

== District 62 ==
2026 New York's 62nd State Assembly district election
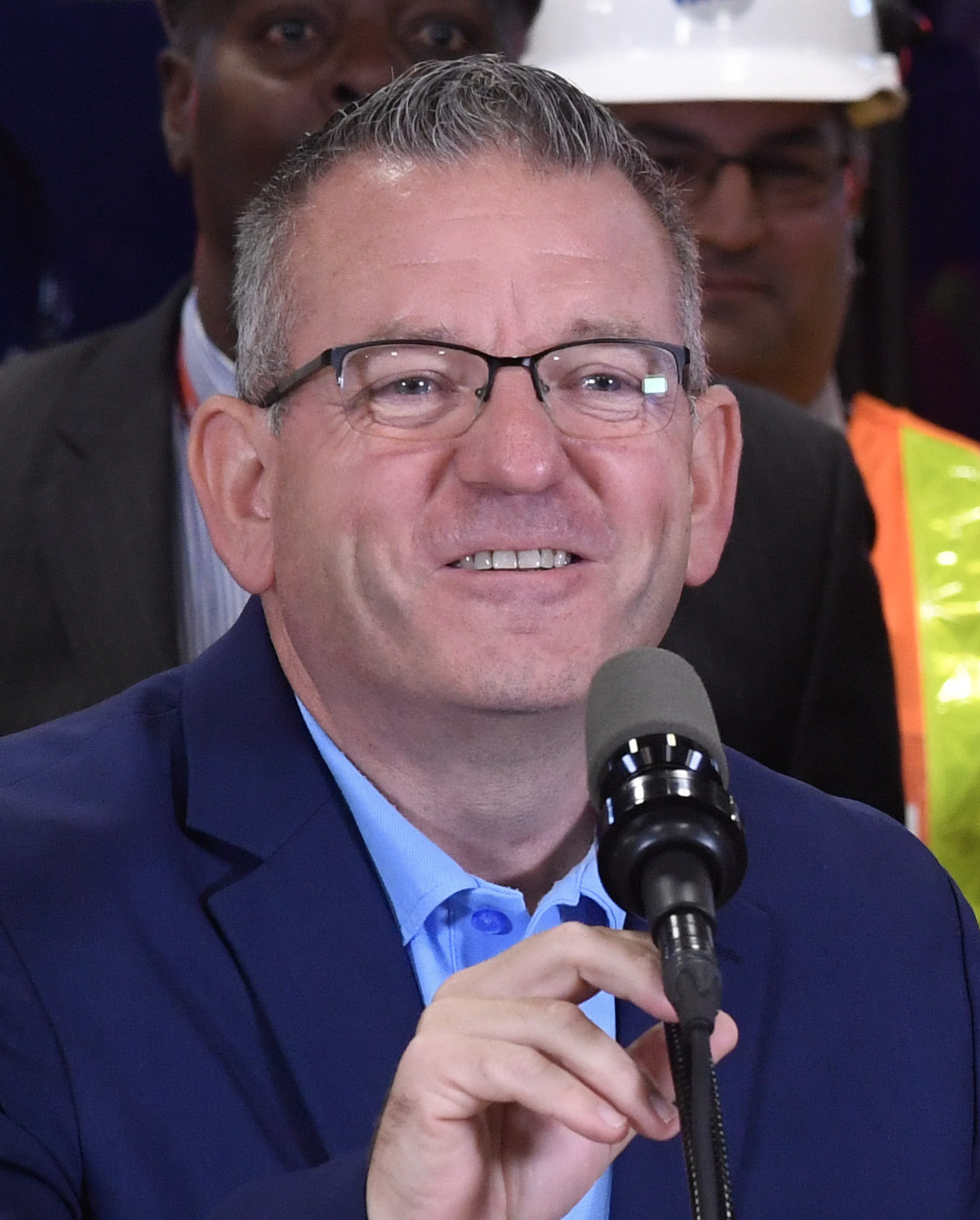
Nominee	Michael Reilly
Party	Republican
Alliance	Conservative
Incumbent Assemblymember
Michael Reilly
Republican

The 62nd district is located entirely within Staten Island in New York City, including parts of the community board districts of Community Board 2 and Community Board 3. The incumbent is Republican Michael Reilly, who ran unopposed to win a fourth term with 98.82% of the vote in 2024.

=== Republican primary ===
==== Nominee ====
- Michael Reilly, incumbent assemblymember

==== Disqualified ====
- John Anthony Tabacco, Newsmax TV host, candidate for New York City's 49th City Council district in the 2009 special election, and Libertarian nominee for New York City Comptroller in 2021

==== Fundraising ====
Italics indicate a disqualified candidate.

Campaign finance reports as of October 19, 2026
Candidate	Contributions	Loans	Expenditures
Michael Reilly (R)	$107,575.56	$0.00	$103,929.74
John Anthony Tabacco	$100.00	$0.00	$100.00
Source: Transparency USA

=== Third parties and independents ===
==== Declared ====
- Michael Reilly (Conservative), incumbent assemblymember

=== General election ===
==== Predictions ====
Source	Ranking	As of
State Navigate	Uncontested R	November 2, 2026

==== Fundraising ====
Campaign finance reports as of October 19, 2026
Candidate	Contributions	Loans	Expenditures
Michael Reilly (R)	$107,575.56	$0.00	$103,929.74
Source: Transparency USA

==== Results ====
2026 New York's 62nd State Assembly district election
Party	Candidate	Votes	%	±%
Republican	Michael Reilly			
Conservative	Michael Reilly			
Total	Michael Reilly (incumbent)			
Write-in				
Total votes				

== District 63 ==
2026 New York's 63rd State Assembly district election
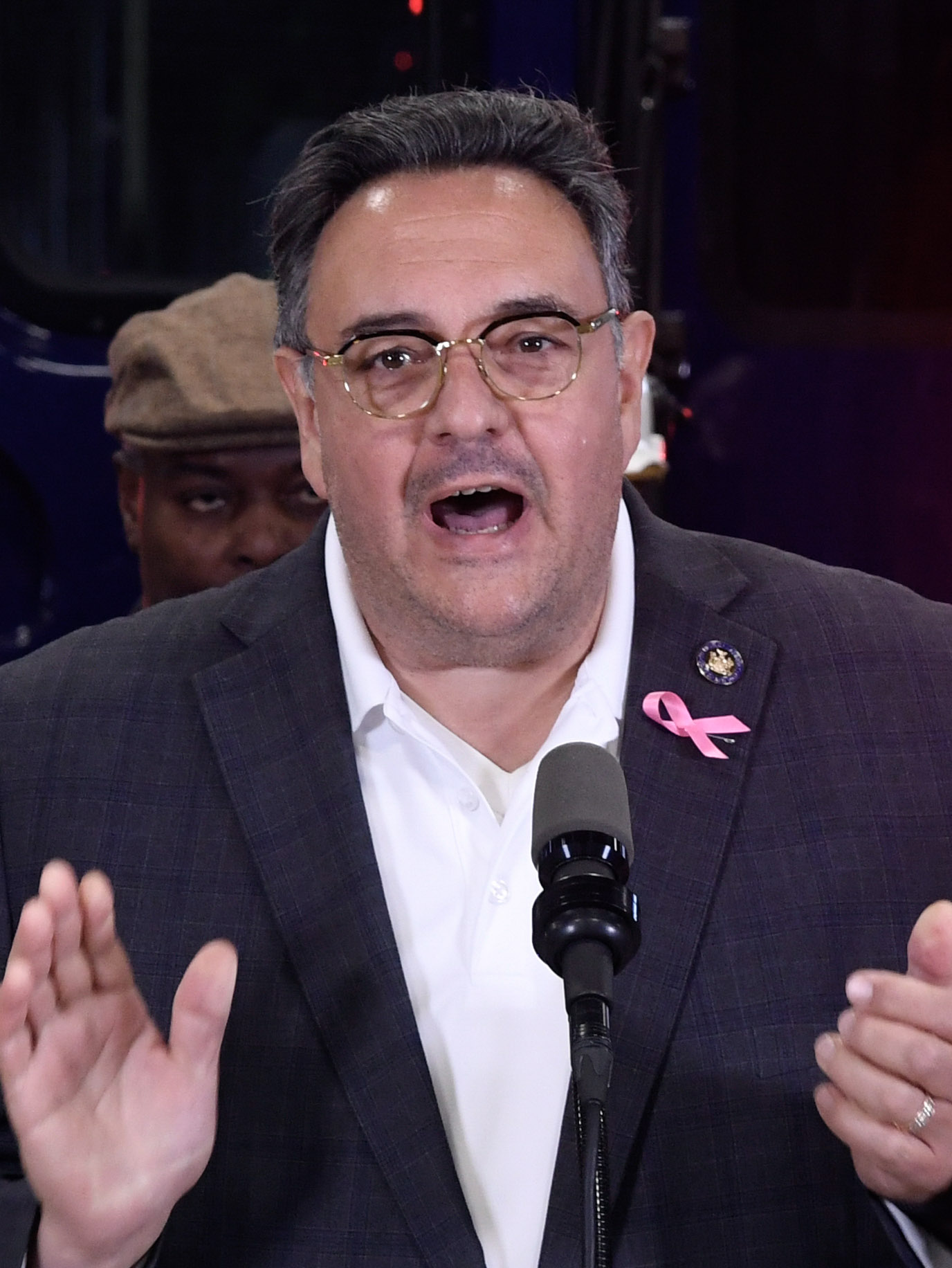

Nominee	Sam Pirozzolo	Matthew K. Mobilia
Party	Republican	Democratic
Alliance	Conservative
Incumbent Assemblymember
Sam Pirozzolo
Republican

The 63rd district is located entirely within Staten Island in New York City, including parts of the community board districts of Community Board 1, Community Board 2, and Community Board 3. The incumbent is Republican Sam Pirozzolo, who defeated Democrat Matthew K. Mobilia to win a second term with 57.3% of the vote in 2024.

=== Republican primary ===
==== Nominee ====
- Sam Pirozzolo, incumbent assemblymember

=== Democratic primary ===
==== Nominee ====
- Matthew K. Mobilia, attorney and nominee for this district in 2024

=== Third parties and independents ===
==== Declared ====
- Sam Pirozzolo (Conservative), incumbent assemblymember

==== Disqualified ====
- Matthew K. Mobilia (Affordable & Safe), attorney and Democratic nominee for this district in 2024

=== General election ===
==== Predictions ====
Source	Ranking	As of
State Navigate	Very Likely R	November 2, 2026

==== Fundraising ====
Campaign finance reports as of October 19, 2026
Candidate	Contributions	Loans	Expenditures
Sam Pirozzolo (R)	$276,564.85	$0.00	$220,355.56
Matthew K. Mobilia (D)	$116,177.23	$0.00	$131,899.06
Source: Transparency USA

==== Results ====
2026 New York's 63rd State Assembly district election
Party	Candidate	Votes	%	±%
Republican	Sam Pirozzolo			
Conservative	Sam Pirozzolo			
Total	Sam Pirozzolo (incumbent)			
Democratic	Matthew K. Mobilia			
Write-in				
Total votes				

== District 64 ==
2026 New York's 64th State Assembly district election
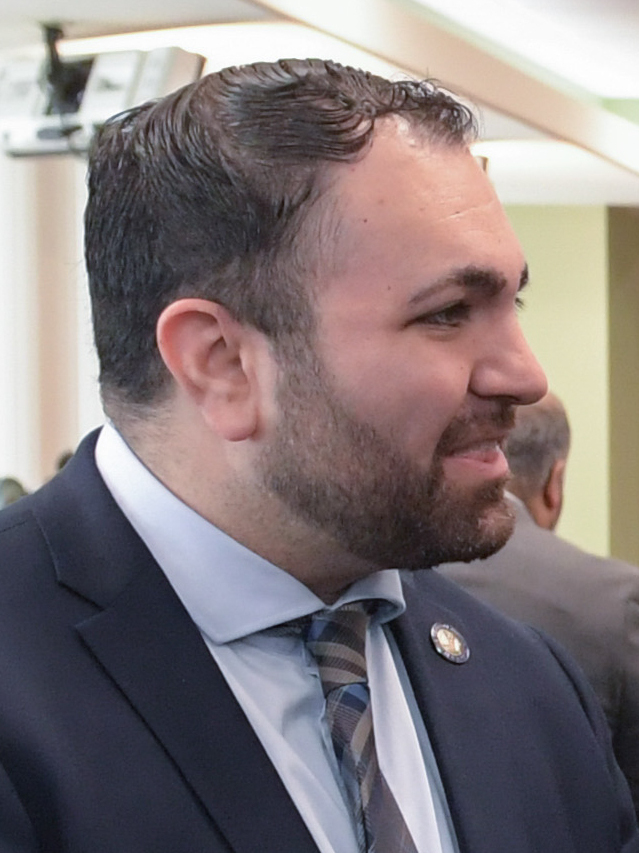

Nominee	Michael Tannousis	Shpetim Qorraj
Party	Republican	Democratic
Alliance	Conservative
Incumbent Assemblymember
Michael Tannousis
Republican

The 64th district is located within New York City, including parts of the community board district of Community Board 10 in Brooklyn and parts of the community board districts of Community Board 1, Community Board 2, and Community Board 3 in Staten Island. The incumbent is Republican Michael Tannousis, who ran unopposed to win a third term with 97.28% of the vote in 2024.

=== Republican primary ===
==== Nominee ====
- Michael Tannousis, incumbent assemblymember

=== Democratic primary ===
==== Nominee ====
- Shpetim "Tim" Qorraj, real estate agent and founder of Skyler Services Group LLC

=== Third parties and independents ===
==== Declared ====
- Michael Tannousis (Conservative), incumbent assemblymember

==== Disqualified ====
- Shpetim "Tim" Qorraj (Affordable & Safe), real estate agent and founder of Skyler Services Group LLC

=== General election ===
==== Predictions ====
Source	Ranking	As of
State Navigate	Solid R	November 2, 2026

==== Fundraising ====
Campaign finance reports as of October 19, 2026
Candidate	Contributions	Loans	Expenditures
Michael Tannousis (R)	$214,422.07	$0.00	$103,031.31
Shpetim Qorraj (D)	$253,564.93	$10,000.00	$239,595.83
Source: Transparency USA

==== Results ====
2026 New York's 64th State Assembly district election
Party	Candidate	Votes	%	±%
Republican	Michael Tannousis			
Conservative	Michael Tannousis			
Total	Michael Tannousis (incumbent)			
Democratic	Shpetim Qorraj			
Write-in				
Total votes				

== District 65 ==
2026 New York's 65th State Assembly district election
Nominee	Illapa Sairitupac	Helen Qiu
Party	Democratic	Republican
Incumbent Assemblymember
Grace Lee
Democratic

The 65th district is located entirely within Manhattan in New York City, including parts of the community board districts of Brooklyn Community Board 2, Manhattan Community Board 1, Manhattan Community Board 2, and Manhattan Community Board 3. The incumbent is Democrat Grace Lee, who ran unopposed to win a second term with 99.11% of the vote in 2024.

On February 3, 2026, Lee announced that she would run for the New York State Senate in the 27th district to succeed retiring four-full-term Democratic incumbent Brian P. Kavanagh.

=== Democratic primary ===
==== Nominee ====
- Illapa Sairitupac, social worker, tenant organizer, and candidate for this seat in 2022

==== Eliminated in primary ====
- Mariama N. James, Manhattan Community Board 1 treasurer (2009–present)
- Lilah Mejia, New York Disaster Interfaith Services outreach manager
- Jasmin Sanchez, district leader
- Wei-Li Tjong, attorney
- Jay Jacky Wong, district leader

==== Declined ====
- Grace Lee, incumbent assemblymember (running for New York State Senate)

==== Endorsements ====
Illapa Sairitupac

U.S. senators

- Bernie Sanders, Vermont (2007–present) (Independent)

Local officials

- Zohran Mamdani, mayor of New York City (2026–present)

Labor unions

- Hotel and Gaming Trades Council
- SEIU 32BJ
- United Auto Workers Region 9A

Organizations

- New York City Democratic Socialists of America
- Sunrise Movement
Jasmin Sanchez

U.S. representatives

- Nydia Velázquez, NY-07 (1993–present)

Organizations

- Citizen Action of New York
Wei-Li Tjong

State legislators

- John Liu, state senator from the 16th district (2019–present)
Mariama N. James

Organizations

- Stonewall Democrats
Lilah Mejia

Local officials

- Harvey Epstein, New York City councilmember from the 2nd district (2025–present)

==== Fundraising ====
Campaign finance reports as of October 19, 2026
Candidate	Contributions	Loans	Expenditures
Illapa Sairitupac (D)	$349,354.42	$0.00	$342,921.19
Jasmin Sanchez (D)	$0.00	$0.00	$0.00
Wei-Li Tjong (D)	$308,070.13	$0.00	$303,978.78
Jay Jacky Wong (D)	$234,235.90	$14,000.00	$213,468.09
Mariama N. James (D)	$131,014.21	$8,507.03	$160,442.60
Lilah Mejia (D)	$22,979.00	$0.00	$33,790.35
Source: Transparency USA

==== Results ====
2026 New York's 65th State Assembly district Democratic primary election
Party	Candidate	Votes	%
Democratic	Illapa Sairitupac	4,417	36.86%
Democratic	Jasmin Sanchez	2,095	17.48%
Democratic	Wei-Li Tjong	1,822	15.20%
Democratic	Jay Jacky Wong	1,819	15.18%
Democratic	Mariama N. James	1,258	10.50%
Democratic	Lilah Mejia	533	4.45%
Write-in		39	0.33%
Total votes		11,983	100.00%

=== Republican primary ===
==== Nominee ====
- Helen Qiu, perennial candidate

=== General election ===
==== Predictions ====
Source	Ranking	As of
State Navigate	Solid D	November 2, 2026

==== Fundraising ====
Campaign finance reports as of October 19, 2026
Candidate	Contributions	Loans	Expenditures
Illapa Sairitupac (D)	$349,354.42	$0.00	$342,921.19
Helen Qiu (R)	$146,984.39	$0.00	$117,077.05
Source: Transparency USA

==== Results ====
2026 New York's 65th State Assembly district election
Party	Candidate	Votes	%	±%
Democratic	Illapa Sairitupac			
Republican	Helen Qiu			
Write-in				
Total votes				

== District 66 ==
2026 New York's 66th State Assembly district election
Nominee	David Alfasi Siffert
Party	Democratic
Incumbent Assemblymember
Deborah J. Glick
Democratic

The 66th district is located entirely within Manhattan in New York City, including parts of the community board districts of Community Board 1, Community Board 2, Community Board 3, Community Board 4, and Community Board 5. The incumbent is Democrat Deborah J. Glick, who ran unopposed to win an eighteenth term with 98.92% of the vote in 2024.

On October 22, 2025, Glick announced she would not run for re-election to a nineteenth term.

=== Democratic primary ===
==== Nominee ====
- David Alfasi Siffert, executive director of the State Government Initiative at New York University School of Law

==== Eliminated in primary ====
- Furhan Ahmad, firefighter
- Corinne Arnold, co-op election business owner
- Ryder B. Kessler, nonprofit executive and community organizer
- Jeannine Kiely, district leader
- Benjamin Yee, district leader

==== Declined ====
- Deborah J. Glick, incumbent assemblymember

==== Endorsements ====
David Alfasi Siffert

Organizations

- Jim Owles Liberal Democratic Club
- Our Revolution
- Sunrise Movement
Ryder B. Kessler

Labor unions

- Communications Workers of America
- Hotel and Gaming Trades Council

Organizations

- Advocates for Trans Equality
- Citizen Action of New York
- Run for Something
- Stonewall Democratic Club of New York City

Political parties

- New York Working Families Party
Jeannine Kiely

State legislators

- Deborah J. Glick, state assemblymember from the 66th district (1991–present)

Labor unions

- New York State United Teachers

==== Fundraising ====
Campaign finance reports as of October 19, 2026
Candidate	Contributions	Loans	Expenditures
David Alfasi Siffert (D)	$408,332.30	$0.00	$385,555.45
Jeannine Kiely (D)	$396,312.76	$0.00	$339,981.56
Ryder B. Kessler (D)	$470,261.79	$0.00	$470,829.65
Benjamin Yee (D)	$277,673.09	$0.00	$276,007.30
Corinne Arnold (D)	$196,053.00	$0.00	$189,537.09
Furhan Ahmad (D)	$208,551.75	$0.00	$205,469.27
Source: Transparency USA

==== Results ====
2026 New York's 66th State Assembly district Democratic primary election
Party	Candidate	Votes	%
Democratic	David Alfasi Siffert	4,388	27.38%
Democratic	Jeannine Kiely	4,373	27.29%
Democratic	Ryder B. Kessler	3,641	22.72%
Democratic	Benjamin Yee	2,238	13.96%
Democratic	Corinne Arnold	727	4.54%
Democratic	Furhan Ahmad	610	3.81%
Write-in		50	0.31%
Total votes		16,027	100.00%

=== Third parties and independents ===
==== Withdrawn ====
- Ryder B. Kessler (Working Families), nonprofit executive and community organizer

=== General election ===
==== Predictions ====
Source	Ranking	As of
State Navigate	Solid D	November 2, 2026

==== Post-primary endorsements ====
David Alfasi Siffert

Political parties

- New York Working Families Party

==== Fundraising ====
Italics indicate a withdrawn candidate.

Campaign finance reports as of October 19, 2026
Candidate	Contributions	Loans	Expenditures
David Alfasi Siffert (D)	$408,332.30	$0.00	$385,555.45
Ryder B. Kessler	$470,261.79	$0.00	$470,829.65
Source: Transparency USA

==== Results ====
2026 New York's 66th State Assembly district election
Party	Candidate	Votes	%	±%
Democratic	David Alfasi Siffert			
Write-in				
Total votes				

== District 67 ==
2026 New York's 67th State Assembly district election
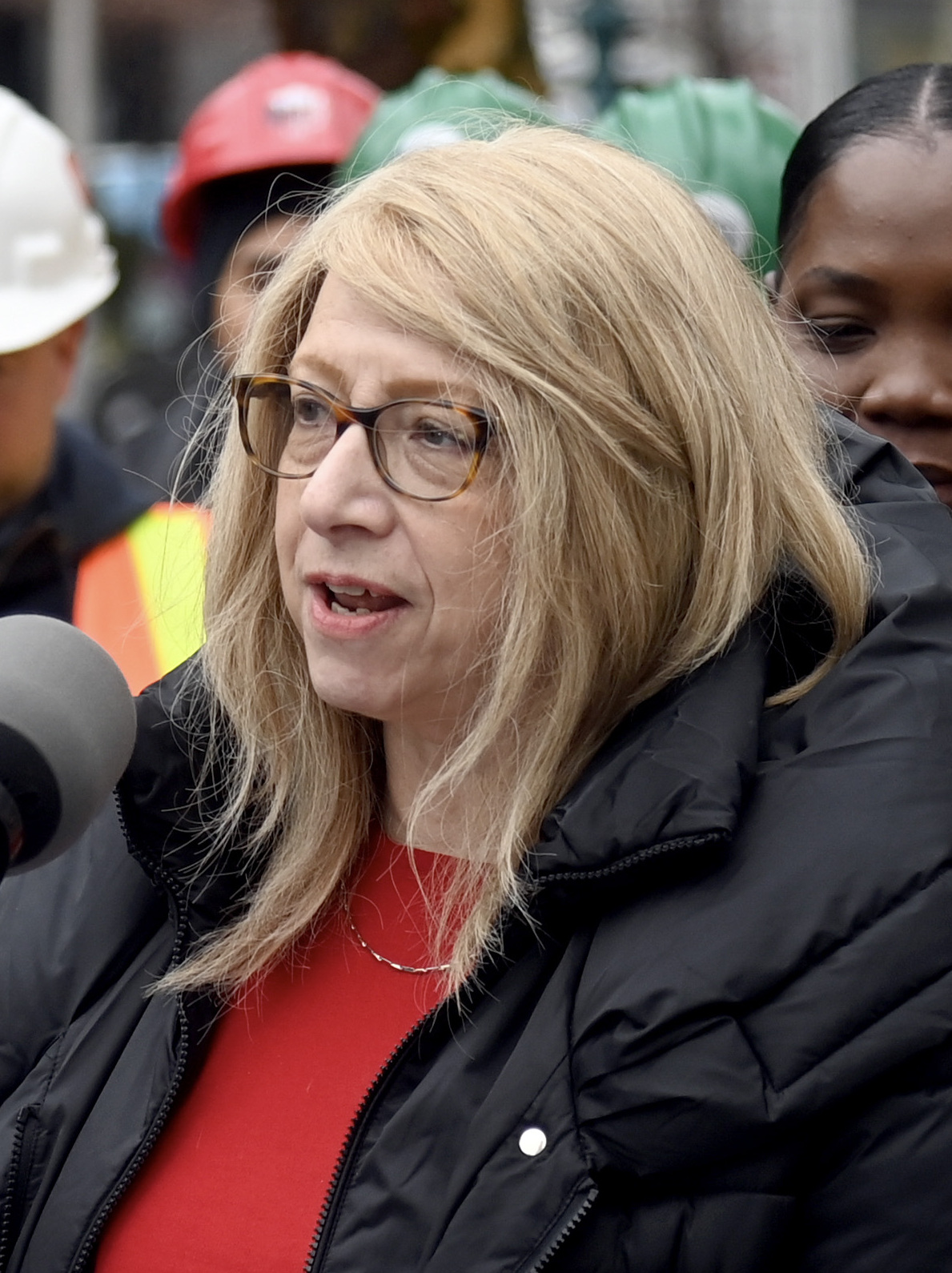
Nominee	Linda Rosenthal
Party	Democratic
Alliance	Working Families
Incumbent Assemblymember
Linda Rosenthal
Democratic

The 67th district is located entirely within Manhattan in New York City, including parts of the community board districts of Community Board 4 and Community Board 7. The incumbent is Democrat Linda Rosenthal, who ran unopposed to win a tenth full term with 98.8% of the vote in 2024.

=== Democratic primary ===
==== Nominee ====
- Linda Rosenthal, incumbent assemblymember

==== Endorsements ====
Linda Rosenthal

Organizations

- Stonewall Democratic Club of New York City

Political parties

- New York Working Families Party

=== Republican primary ===
==== Disqualified ====
- Mike Muñoz, former army sergeant

==== Endorsements ====
Mike Muñoz

Organizations

- New York Young Republican Club

=== Third parties and independents ===
==== Declared ====
- Linda Rosenthal (Working Families), incumbent assemblymember

==== Disqualified ====
- Mike Muñoz (Conservative), former army sergeant

=== General election ===
==== Predictions ====
Source	Ranking	As of
State Navigate	Uncontested D	November 2, 2026

==== Fundraising ====
Italics indicate a disqualified candidate.

Campaign finance reports as of October 19, 2026
Candidate	Contributions	Loans	Expenditures
Linda Rosenthal (D)	$27,525.50	$0.00	$42,331.27
Mike Muñoz	$0.00	$0.00	$0.00
Source: Transparency USA

==== Results ====
2026 New York's 67th State Assembly district election
Party	Candidate	Votes	%	±%
Democratic	Linda Rosenthal			
Working Families	Linda Rosenthal			
Total	Linda Rosenthal (incumbent)			
Write-in				
Total votes				

== District 68 ==
2026 New York's 68th State Assembly district election
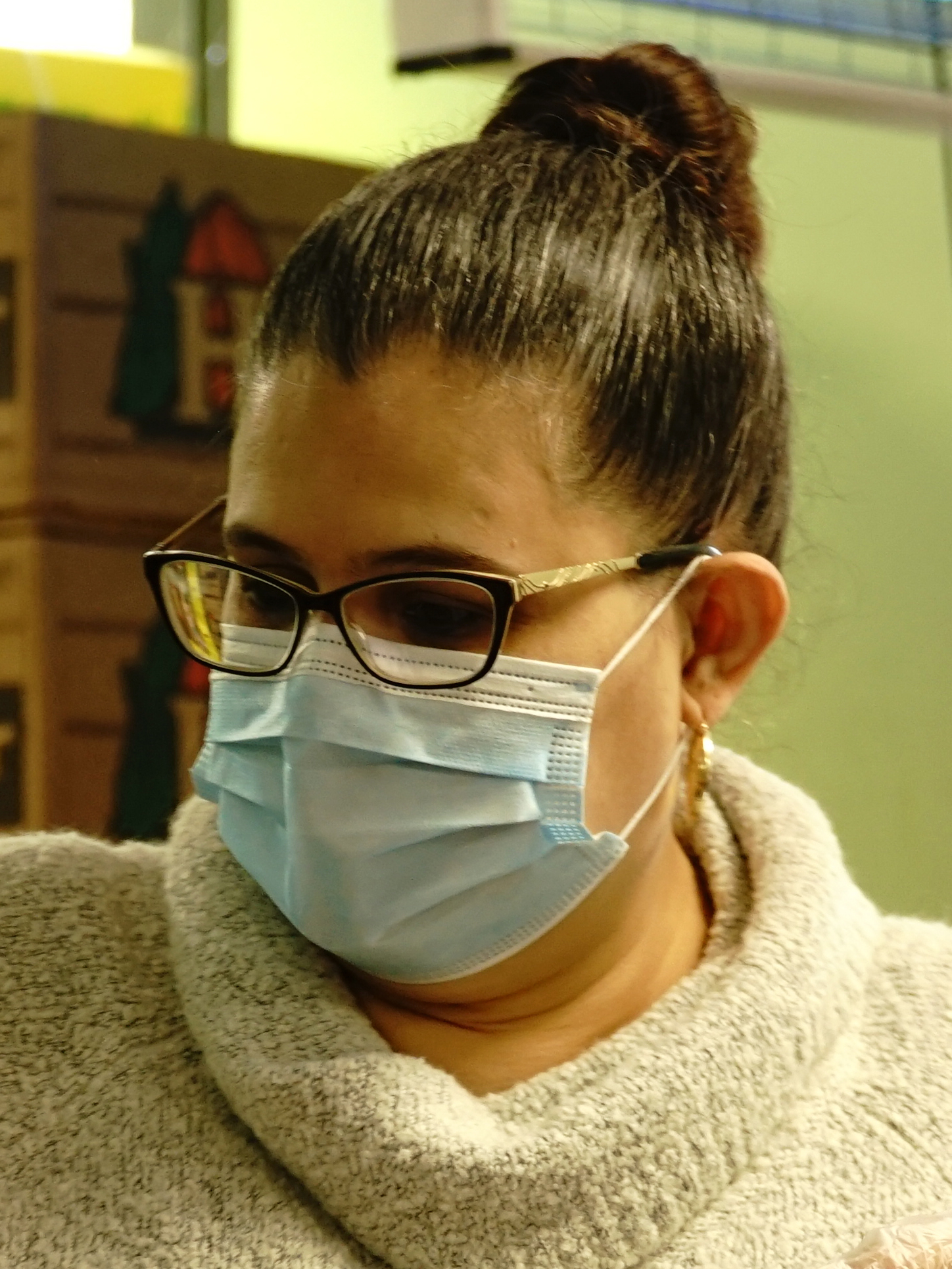
Nominee	Diana Ayala
Party	Democratic
Alliance	Working Families
Incumbent Assemblymember
Eddie Gibbs
Democratic

The 68th district is located entirely within Manhattan in New York City, including parts of the community board districts of Community Board 8, Community Board 10, and Community Board 11. The incumbent is Democrat Eddie Gibbs, who ran unopposed to win a second full term with 98.8% of the vote in 2024.

=== Democratic primary ===
==== Nominee ====
- Diana Ayala, former deputy speaker of the New York City Council (2022–2025) from the 8th district (2018–2025)

==== Eliminated in primary ====
- Eddie Gibbs, incumbent assemblymember
- Tamika Mapp, candidate for this district in 2020, 2022, and 2024, candidate for New York City's 8th City Council district in 2017 and 2021
- William Smith, district leader

==== Disqualified ====
- Tameeka Garcia-Taylor, United States Army and National Guard veteran

==== Endorsements ====
Diana Ayala

Organizations

- Stonewall Democratic Club of New York City

Political parties

- New York Working Families Party
Eddie Gibbs

Labor unions

- New York State United Teachers

==== Fundraising ====
Italics indicate a disqualified candidate.

Campaign finance reports as of October 19, 2026
Candidate	Contributions	Loans	Expenditures
Diana Ayala (D)	$195,796.65	$0.00	$190,911.55
Eddie Gibbs (D)	$230,586.92	$0.00	$193,555.82
Tamika Mapp (D)	$49,397.10	$1,500.00	$42,023.05
William Smith (D)	$6,980.39	$0.00	$429.48
Tameeka Garcia-Taylor	$12,245.00	$0.00	$0.00
Source: Transparency USA

==== Results ====
2026 New York's 68th State Assembly district Democratic primary election
Party	Candidate	Votes	%
Democratic	Diana Ayala	5,759	51.93%
Democratic	Eddie Gibbs (incumbent)	3,453	31.14%
Democratic	Tamika Mapp	1,273	11.48%
Democratic	William Smith	564	5.09%
Write-in		40	0.36%
Total votes		11,089	100.00%

=== Republican primary ===
==== Disqualified ====
- Darwin Shaw

=== Third parties and independents ===
==== Declared ====
- Diana Ayala (Working Families), former deputy speaker of the New York City Council (2022–2025) from the 8th district (2018–2025)

==== Disqualified ====
- Tamika Mapp (Homes First), Democratic candidate for this district in 2020, 2022, and 2024, candidate for New York City's 8th City Council district in 2017 and 2021

=== General election ===
==== Predictions ====
Source	Ranking	As of
State Navigate	Uncontested D	November 2, 2026

==== Fundraising ====
Italics indicate a disqualified candidate.

Campaign finance reports as of October 19, 2026
Candidate	Contributions	Loans	Expenditures
Diana Ayala (D)	$195,796.65	$0.00	$190,911.55
Darwin Shaw	$0.00	$0.00	$0.00
Tamika Mapp	$49,397.10	$1,500.00	$42,023.05
Source: Transparency USA

==== Results ====
2026 New York's 68th State Assembly district election
Party	Candidate	Votes	%	±%
Democratic	Diana Ayala			
Working Families	Diana Ayala			
Total	Diana Ayala			
Write-in				
Total votes				

== District 69 ==
2026 New York's 69th State Assembly district election
Nominee	Eli Northrup
Party	Democratic
Alliance	Working Families
Incumbent Assemblymember
Micah Lasher
Democratic

The 69th district is located entirely within Manhattan in New York City, including parts of the community board districts of Community Board 7 and Community Board 9. The incumbent is Democrat Micah Lasher, who ran unopposed to succeed retiring eleven-term Democratic incumbent Daniel J. O'Donnell with 99.11% of the vote in 2024.

On September 15, 2025, Lasher announced that he would run for the United States House of Representatives in New York's 12th congressional district to succeed retiring seventeen-full-term Democratic incumbent Jerry Nadler.

=== Democratic primary ===
==== Nominee ====
- Eli Northrup, lawyer

==== Eliminated in primary ====
- Stephanie R. Ruskay, rabbi and multifaith organizer

==== Declined ====
- Micah Lasher, incumbent assemblymember (running for the United States House of Representatives)

==== Endorsements ====
Eli Northrup

U.S. senators

- Bernie Sanders, Vermont (2007–present) (Independent)

U.S. representatives

- Alexandria Ocasio-Cortez, NY-14 (2019–present)

Local officials

- Zohran Mamdani, mayor of New York City (2026–present)
- Helen Rosenthal, New York City councilmember from the 6th district (2014–2022)

Labor unions

- United Auto Workers Region 9A

Organizations

- The Jewish Vote
- Our Revolution
- Run for Something
- Stonewall Democratic Club of New York City
- Sunrise Movement

Political parties

- New York Working Families Party
Stephanie R. Ruskay

Local officials

- Mark Levine, New York City comptroller, (2026–present)
- Brad Hoylman-Sigal, Manhattan borough president (2026–present)
- Shaun Abreu, majority leader of the New York City Council (2026–present) from the 7th district (2022–present)
- Gale Brewer, New York City councilmember from the 6th district (2002–2013, 2022–present)
- Daniel Garodnick, chair of the New York City Planning Commission (2022–2026) and former New York City councilmember from the 4th district (2006–2017)
- Ruth Messinger, Manhattan borough president (1990–1997)

Labor unions

- New York State United Teachers
- SEIU 32BJ

==== Fundraising ====
Campaign finance reports as of October 19, 2026
Candidate	Contributions	Loans	Expenditures
Eli Northrup (D)	$501,901.17	$0.00	$493,346.94
Stephanie R. Ruskay (D)	$481,300.50	$0.00	$478,532.36
Source: Transparency USA

==== Results ====
2026 New York's 69th State Assembly district Democratic primary election
Party	Candidate	Votes	%
Democratic	Eli Northrup	15,713	60.42%
Democratic	Stephanie R. Ruskay	10,211	39.26%
Write-in		83	0.32%
Total votes		26,007	100.00%

=== Third parties and independents ===
==== Declared ====
- Eli Northrup (Working Families), lawyer

=== General election ===
==== Predictions ====
Source	Ranking	As of
State Navigate	Uncontested D	November 2, 2026

==== Fundraising ====
Campaign finance reports as of October 19, 2026
Candidate	Contributions	Loans	Expenditures
Eli Northrup (D)	$501,901.17	$0.00	$493,346.94
Source: Transparency USA

==== Results ====
2026 New York's 69th State Assembly district election
Party	Candidate	Votes	%	±%
Democratic	Eli Northrup			
Working Families	Eli Northrup			
Total	Eli Northrup			
Write-in				
Total votes				

== District 70 ==
2026 New York's 70th State Assembly district election
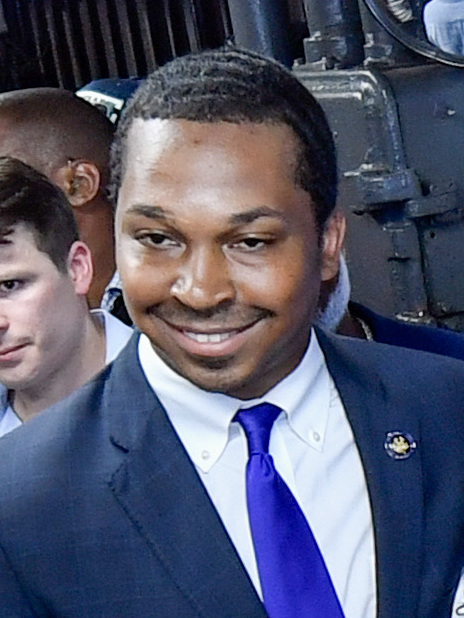
Nominee	Jordan Wright
Party	Democratic
Incumbent Assemblymember
Jordan Wright
Democratic

The 70th district is located entirely within Manhattan in New York City, including parts of the community board districts of Community Board 9, Community Board 10, and Community Board 11. The incumbent is Democrat Jordan Wright, who defeated Republican Seson Adams to succeed retiring four-term Democratic incumbent Inez Dickens with 90.95% of the vote in 2024.

=== Democratic primary ===
==== Nominee ====
- Jordan Wright, incumbent assemblymember

==== Eliminated in primary ====
- Conrad Blackburn, public defender and union organizer

==== Endorsements ====
Jordan Wright

Organizations

- Stonewall Democratic Club of New York City
Conrad Blackburn

U.S. senators

- Bernie Sanders, Vermont (2007–present) (Independent)

State legislators

- Julia Salazar, state senator from the 18th district (2019–present)

Labor unions

- United Auto Workers Region 9A

Organizations

- New York City Democratic Socialists of America
- Run for Something

Political parties

- New York Working Families Party

==== Fundraising ====
Campaign finance reports as of October 19, 2026
Candidate	Contributions	Loans	Expenditures
Jordan Wright (D)	$453,925.10	$0.00	$432,416.28
Conrad Blackburn (D)	$333,165.96	$0.00	$345,324.07
Source: Transparency USA

==== Results ====
2026 New York's 70th State Assembly district Democratic primary election
Party	Candidate	Votes	%
Democratic	Jordan Wright (incumbent)	9,152	54.86%
Democratic	Conrad Blackburn	7,456	44.69%
Write-in		75	0.45%
Total votes		16,683	100.00%

=== Third parties and independents ===
==== Withdrawn ====
- Conrad Blackburn (Working Families), public defender and union organizer

=== General election ===
==== Predictions ====
Source	Ranking	As of
State Navigate	Solid D	November 2, 2026

==== Fundraising ====
Italics indicate a withdrawn candidate.

Campaign finance reports as of October 19, 2026
Candidate	Contributions	Loans	Expenditures
Jordan Wright (D)	$453,925.10	$0.00	$432,416.28
Conrad Blackburn	$333,165.96	$0.00	$345,324.07
Source: Transparency USA

==== Results ====
2026 New York's 70th State Assembly district election
Party	Candidate	Votes	%	±%
Democratic	Jordan Wright (incumbent)			
Write-in				
Total votes				

== District 71 ==
2026 New York's 71st State Assembly district election
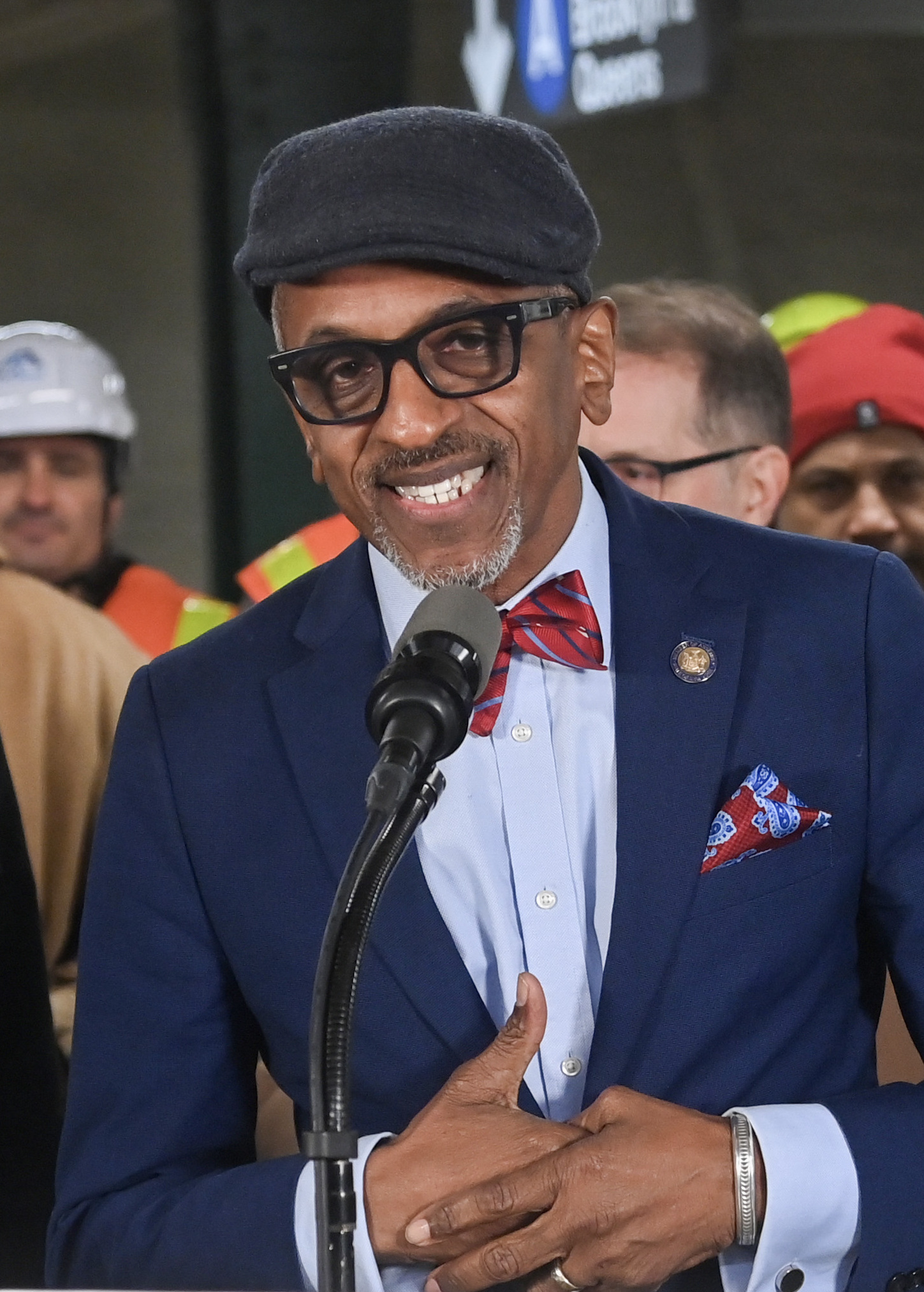
Nominee	Al Taylor
Party	Democratic
Alliance	Working Families
Incumbent Assemblymember
Al Taylor
Democratic

The 71st district is located entirely within Manhattan in New York City, including parts of the community board districts of Bronx Community Board 8, Manhattan Community Board 9, Manhattan Community Board 10, and Manhattan Community Board 12. The incumbent is Democrat Al Taylor, who defeated Republican Joziel Andujar to win a fourth full term with 86.56% of the vote in 2024.

=== Democratic primary ===
==== Nominee ====
- Al Taylor, incumbent assemblymember

==== Eliminated in primary ====
- Rolando Gomez
- Julien Segura, candidate for this district in 2024

==== Endorsements ====
Al Taylor

Organizations

- Stonewall Democratic Club of New York City

Political parties

- New York Working Families Party

==== Fundraising ====
Campaign finance reports as of October 19, 2026
Candidate	Contributions	Loans	Expenditures
Al Taylor (D)	$53,654.90	$0.00	$51,094.28
Julien Segura (D)	$79,732.86	$0.00	$82,471.97
Rolando Gomez (D)	$0.00	$0.00	$0.00
Source: Transparency USA

==== Results ====
2026 New York's 71st State Assembly district Democratic primary election
Party	Candidate	Votes	%
Democratic	Al Taylor (incumbent)	9,174	55.55%
Democratic	Julien Segura	5,603	33.93%
Democratic	Rolando Gomez	1,634	9.89%
Write-in		104	0.63%
Total votes		16,515	100.00%

=== Third parties and independents ===
==== Declared ====
- Al Taylor (Working Families), incumbent assemblymember

=== General election ===
==== Predictions ====
Source	Ranking	As of
State Navigate	Uncontested D	November 2, 2026

==== Fundraising ====
Campaign finance reports as of October 19, 2026
Candidate	Contributions	Loans	Expenditures
Al Taylor (D)	$53,654.90	$0.00	$51,094.28
Source: Transparency USA

==== Results ====
2026 New York's 71st State Assembly district election
Party	Candidate	Votes	%	±%
Democratic	Al Taylor			
Working Families	Al Taylor			
Total	Al Taylor (incumbent)			
Write-in				
Total votes				

== District 72 ==
2026 New York's 72nd State Assembly district election
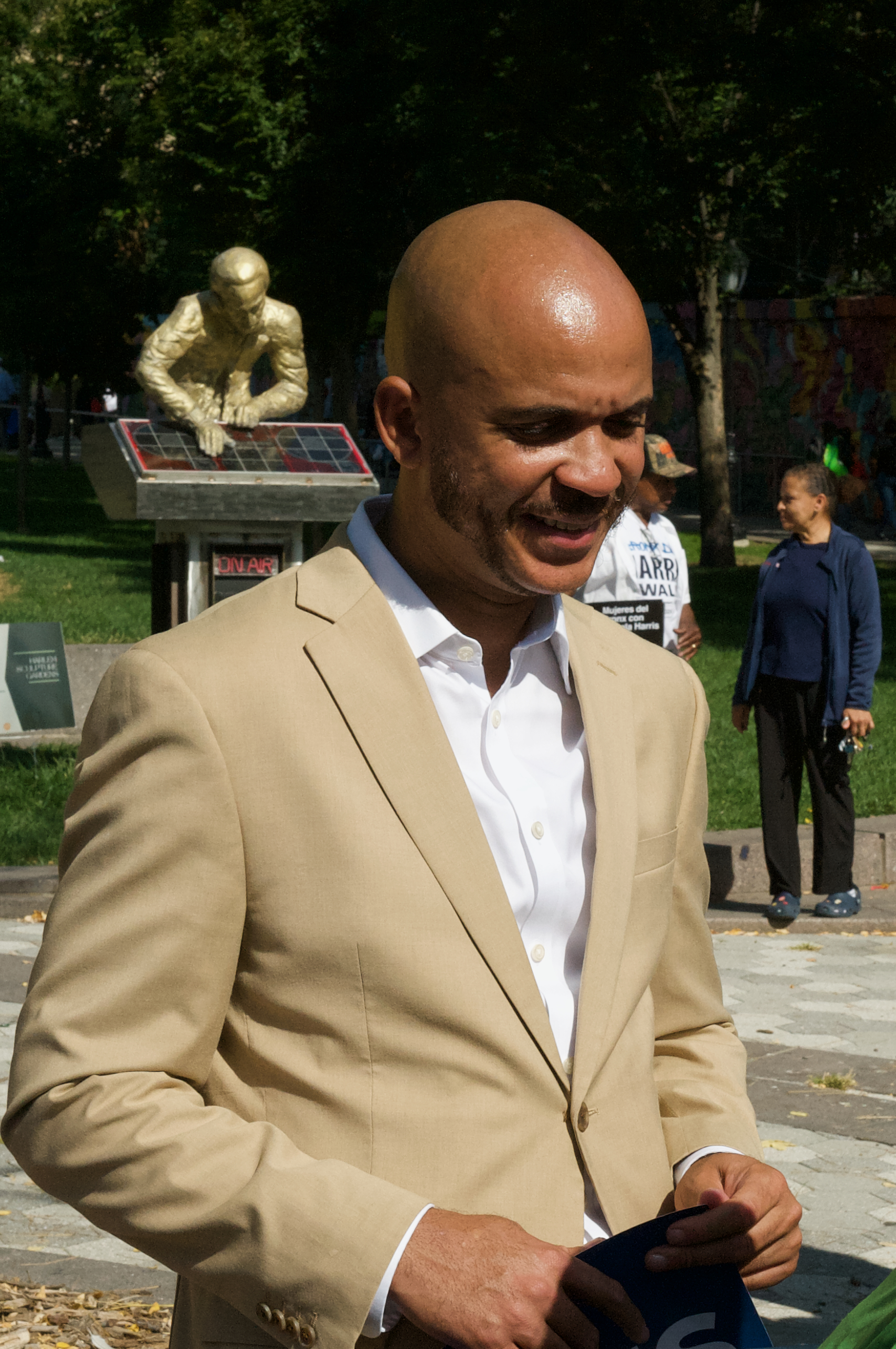
Nominee	Manny De Los Santos
Party	Democratic
Alliance	Working Families
Incumbent Assemblymember
Manny De Los Santos
Democratic

The 72nd district is located entirely within Manhattan in New York City, including parts of the community board districts of Bronx Community Board 7, Bronx Community Board 8, and Manhattan Community Board 12. The incumbent is Democrat Manny De Los Santos, who ran unopposed to win a second full term with 99.17% of the vote in 2024.

=== Democratic primary ===
==== Nominee ====
- Manny De Los Santos, incumbent assemblymember

==== Eliminated in primary ====
- Francesca M. Castellanos, candidate for New York City's 10th City Council district in 2025 and for this district in 2006

==== Endorsements ====
Manny De Los Santos

Organizations

- Stonewall Democratic Club of New York City

Political parties

- New York Working Families Party

==== Fundraising ====
Campaign finance reports as of October 19, 2026
Candidate	Contributions	Loans	Expenditures
Manny De Los Santos (D)	$59,797.16	$0.00	$101,935.83
Francesca M. Castellanos (D)	$0.00	$0.00	$0.00
Source: Transparency USA

==== Results ====
2026 New York's 72nd State Assembly district Democratic primary election
Party	Candidate	Votes	%
Democratic	Manny De Los Santos (incumbent)	9,176	75.58%
Democratic	Francesca M. Castellanos	2,882	23.74%
Write-in		83	0.68%
Total votes		12,141	100.00%

=== Third parties and independents ===
==== Declared ====
- Manny De Los Santos (Working Families), incumbent assemblymember

=== General election ===
==== Predictions ====
Source	Ranking	As of
State Navigate	Uncontested D	November 2, 2026

==== Fundraising ====
Campaign finance reports as of October 19, 2026
Candidate	Contributions	Loans	Expenditures
Manny De Los Santos (D)	$59,797.16	$0.00	$101,935.83
Source: Transparency USA

==== Results ====
2026 New York's 72nd State Assembly district election
Party	Candidate	Votes	%	±%
Democratic	Manny De Los Santos			
Working Families	Manny De Los Santos			
Total	Manny De Los Santos (incumbent)			
Write-in				
Total votes				

== District 73 ==
2026 New York's 73rd State Assembly district election
Nominee	Vanessa Tantillo Aronson
Party	Democratic
Alliance	Working Families
Incumbent Assemblymember
Alex Bores
Democratic

The 73rd district is located entirely within Manhattan in New York City, including parts of the community board districts of Community Board 5, Community Board 6, and Community Board 8. The incumbent is Democrat Alex Bores, who defeated Republican Awadhesh Gupta to win a second term with 73.29% of the vote in 2024.

On October 20, 2025, Bores announced that he would run for the United States House of Representatives in New York's 12th congressional district to succeed retiring seventeen-full-term Democratic incumbent Jerry Nadler.

=== Democratic primary ===
==== Nominee ====
- Vanessa Tantillo Aronson, president of the Lexington Democratic Club and candidate for New York City's 4th City Council district in 2025

==== Declined ====
- Alex Bores, incumbent assemblymember

==== Endorsements ====
Vanessa Tantillo Aronson

Organizations

- Run for Something
- Stonewall Democratic Club of New York City

Political parties

- New York Working Families Party

=== Republican primary ===
==== Withdrawn ====
- David B. Casavis, perennial candidate

=== Third parties and independents ===
==== Declared ====
- Vanessa Tantillo Aronson (Working Families), president of the Lexington Democratic Club and Democratic candidate for New York City's 4th City Council district in 2025

==== Disqualified ====
- Nathaniel Gavronsky (Block Mamdani)

=== General election ===
==== Predictions ====
Source	Ranking	As of
State Navigate	Uncontested D	November 2, 2026

==== Fundraising ====
Italics indicate a withdrawn or disqualified candidate.

Campaign finance reports as of October 19, 2026
Candidate	Contributions	Loans	Expenditures
Vanessa Tantillo Aronson (D)	$153,965.19	$15,000.00	$155,126.53
David B. Casavis	$0.00	$0.00	$0.00
Nathaniel Gavronsky	$0.00	$0.00	$0.00
Source: Transparency USA

==== Results ====
2026 New York's 73rd State Assembly district election
Party	Candidate	Votes	%	±%
Democratic	Vanessa Tantillo Aronson			
Working Families	Vanessa Tantillo Aronson			
Total	Vanessa Tantillo Aronson			
Write-in				
Total votes				

== District 74 ==
2026 New York's 74th State Assembly district election
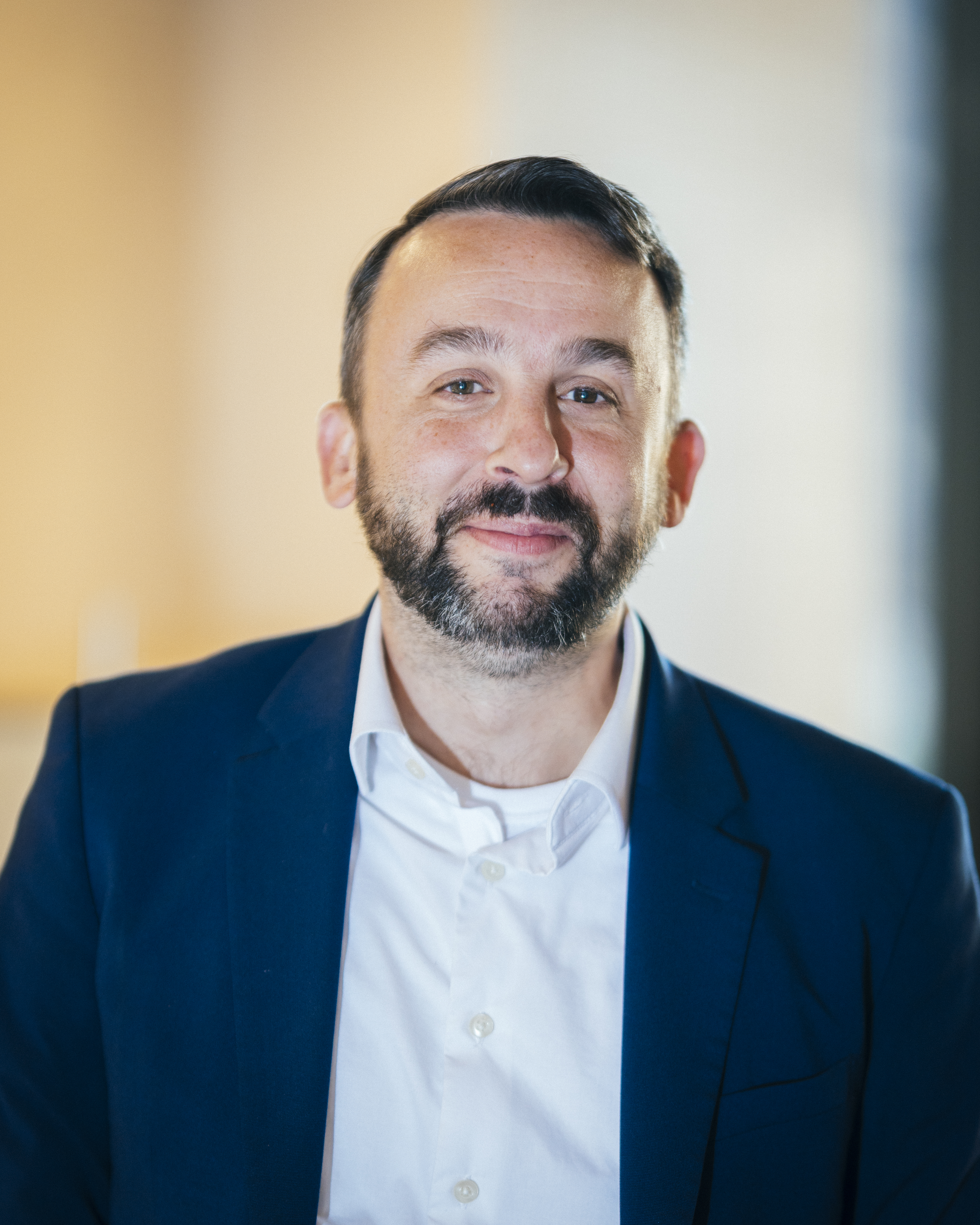

Nominee	Keith Powers	Veronica I. Gonzalez
Party	Democratic	Republican
Alliance		Conservative
Incumbent Assemblymember
Keith Powers
Democratic

The 74th district is located entirely within Manhattan in New York City, including parts of the community board districts of Brooklyn Community Board 1, Manhattan Community Board 3 Manhattan Community Board 5, and Manhattan Community Board 6. The incumbent is Democrat Keith Powers, who defeated Joseph W. Foley to fill the vacancy of four-full-term Democrat Harvey Epstein with 82.53% of the vote in February 2026.

In 2024, incumbent Democratic assemblyman Harvey Epstein ran unopposed to win a fourth full term with 98.97% of the vote. On December 4, 2025, Epstein resigned from the State Assembly to become a member of the New York City Council from the 2nd district after winning the election on November 4. On February 3, 2026, Democrat Keith Powers won the special election with 82.53% of the vote against Republican Joseph W. Foley to succeed Epstein. Powers was sworn in on February 4.

=== Democratic primary ===
==== Nominee ====
- Keith Powers, incumbent assembly member

==== Withdrawn ====
- Josh Arnon
- Kevin O'Keefe

==== Endorsements ====
Keith Powers

Organizations

- Stonewall Democratic Club of New York City
Josh Arnon (withdrawn)

Organizations

- Run for Something

=== Republican primary ===
==== Nominee ====
- Veronica I. Gonzalez, community leader

=== Third parties and independents ===
==== Declared ====
- Veronica I. Gonzalez (Conservative), community leader

==== Disqualified ====
- Veronica I. Gonzalez (Block Mamdani), community leader

=== General election ===
==== Predictions ====
Source	Ranking	As of
State Navigate	Solid D	November 2, 2026

==== Fundraising ====
Campaign finance reports as of October 19, 2026
Candidate	Contributions	Loans	Expenditures
Keith Powers (D)	$89,303.80	$0.00	$78,197.14
Veronica I. Gonzalez (R)	$381.24	$0.00	$250.26
Source: Transparency USA

==== Results ====
2026 New York's 74th State Assembly district election
Party	Candidate	Votes	%	±%
Democratic	Keith Powers (incumbent)			
Republican	Veronica I. Gonzalez			
Conservative	Veronica I. Gonzalez			
Total	Veronica I. Gonzalez			
Write-in				
Total votes				

== District 75 ==
2026 New York's 75th State Assembly district election
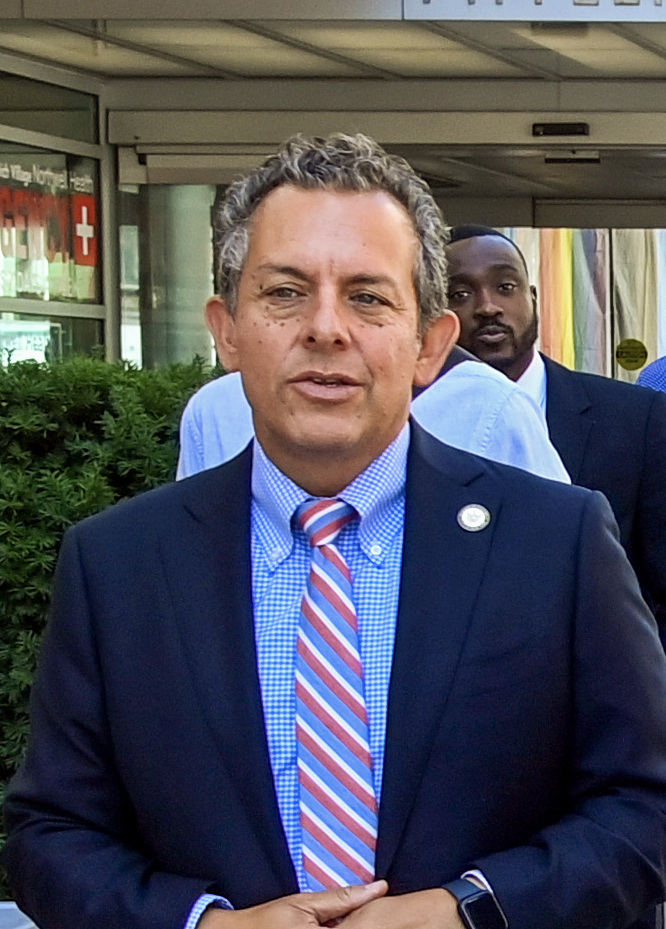

Nominee	Tony Simone	Cristina Fontanelli
Party	Democratic	Republican
Alliance	Working Families	Save NYC
Incumbent Assemblymember
Tony Simone
Democratic

The 75th district is located entirely within Manhattan in New York City, including parts of the community board districts of Community Board 4, Community Board 5, and Community Board 7. The incumbent is Democrat Tony Simone, who ran unopposed to win a second term with 99.08% of the vote in 2024.

=== Democratic primary ===
==== Nominee ====
- Tony Simone, incumbent assemblymember

==== Eliminated in primary ====
- aEmily YueXin Miller, community leader and perennial candidate

==== Withdrawn ====
- Layla Law-Gisiko, Democratic district leader and perennial candidate (running for New York City Council)
- Danny Valdes, organizer and activist

==== Endorsements ====
Tony Simone

Organizations

- Stonewall Democratic Club of New York City

Political parties

- New York Working Families Party

==== Fundraising ====
Campaign finance reports as of October 19, 2026
Candidate	Contributions	Loans	Expenditures
Tony Simone (D)	$308,023.16	$0.00	$274,776.99
aEmily YueXin Miller (D)	$0.00	$0.00	$0.00
Source: Transparency USA

==== Results ====
2026 New York's 75th State Assembly district Democratic primary election
Party	Candidate	Votes	%
Democratic	Tony Simone (incumbent)	10,230	76.78%
Democratic	aEmily YueXin Miller	2,968	22.28%
Write-in		126	0.95%
Total votes		13,324	100.00%

=== Republican primary ===
==== Nominee ====
- Cristina Fontanelli, actress

=== Third parties and independents ===
==== Declared ====
- Tony Simone (Working Families), incumbent assemblymember
- Cristina Fontanelli (Save NYC), actress

==== Disqualified ====
- aEmily YueXin Miller (Conservative), community leader and perennial candidate

=== General election ===
==== Predictions ====
Source	Ranking	As of
State Navigate	Solid D	November 2, 2026

==== Fundraising ====
Italics indicate a disqualified candidate.

Campaign finance reports as of October 19, 2026
Candidate	Contributions	Loans	Expenditures
Tony Simone (D)	$308,023.16	$0.00	$274,776.99
Cristina Fontanelli (R)	$99,704.81	$0.00	$94,392.14
aEmily YueXin Miller	$0.00	$0.00	$0.00
Source: Transparency USA

==== Results ====
2026 New York's 75th State Assembly district election
Party	Candidate	Votes	%	±%
Democratic	Tony Simone			
Working Families	Tony Simone			
Total	Tony Simone (incumbent)			
Republican	Cristina Fontanelli			
Save NYC	Cristina Fontanelli			
Total	Cristina Fontanelli			
Write-in				
Total votes				

== District 76 ==
2026 New York's 76th State Assembly district election
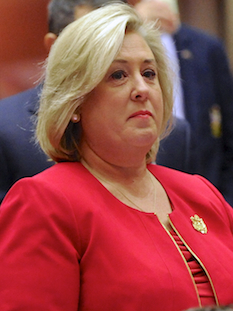

Nominee	Rebecca Seawright	Louis Puliafito
Party	Democratic	Republican
Alliance	Working Families
Incumbent Assemblymember
Rebecca Seawright
Democratic

The 76th district is located entirely within Manhattan in New York City, including parts of the community board districts of Manhattan Community Board 6, Manhattan Community Board 8, Queens Community Board 1, and Queens Community Board 2. The incumbent is Democrat Rebecca Seawright, who ran unopposed to win a sixth term with 98.86% of the vote in 2024.

=== Democratic primary ===
==== Nominee ====
- Rebecca Seawright, incumbent assemblymember

==== Endorsements ====
Rebecca Seawright

Organizations

- Stonewall Democratic Club of New York City

Political parties

- New York Working Families Party

=== Republican primary ===
==== Nominee ====
- Louis Puliafito, producer and host of Decent Life

==== Withdrawn ====
- Michael K. Zumbluskas, perennial candidate

==== Fundraising ====
Italics indicate a withdrawn candidate.

Campaign finance reports as of October 19, 2026
Candidate	Contributions	Loans	Expenditures
Louis Puliafito (R)	$5,577.00	$756.47	$4,999.34
Michael K. Zumbluskas	$0.00	$0.00	$0.00
Source: Transparency USA

=== Third parties and independents ===
==== Declared ====
- Rebecca Seawright (Working Families), incumbent assemblymember

=== General election ===
==== Predictions ====
Source	Ranking	As of
State Navigate	Solid D	November 2, 2026

==== Fundraising ====
Campaign finance reports as of October 19, 2026
Candidate	Contributions	Loans	Expenditures
Rebecca Seawright (D)	$176,161.00	$0.00	$135,181.79
Louis Puliafito (R)	$5,577.00	$756.47	$4,999.34
Source: Transparency USA

==== Results ====
2026 New York's 76th State Assembly district election
Party	Candidate	Votes	%	±%
Democratic	Rebecca Seawright			
Working Families	Rebecca Seawright			
Total	Rebecca Seawright (incumbent)			
Republican	Louis Puliafito			
Write-in				
Total votes				

== District 77 ==
2026 New York's 77th State Assembly district election
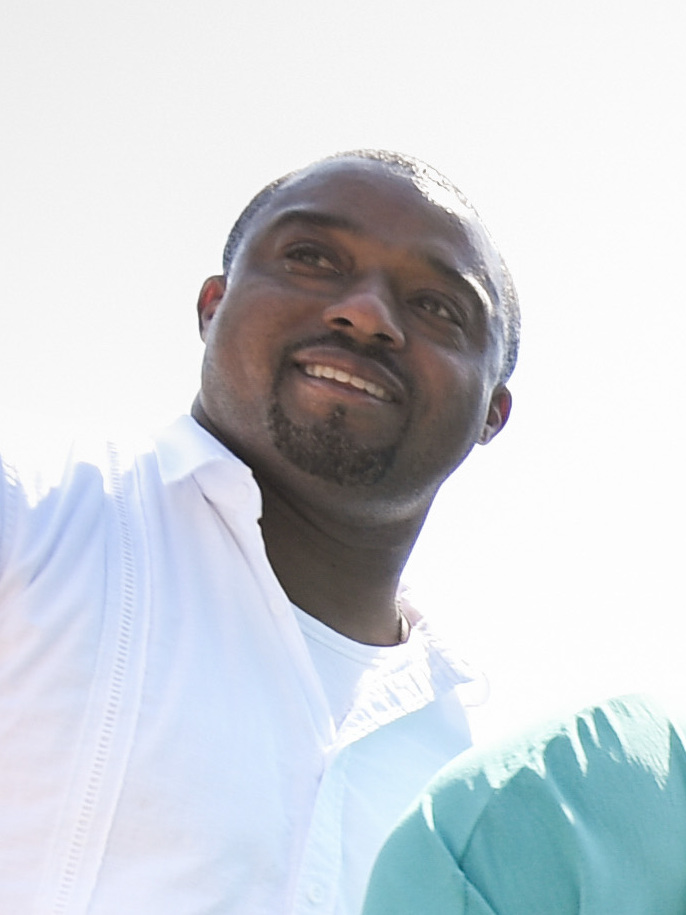
Nominee	Landon Dais
Party	Democratic
Incumbent Assemblymember
Landon Dais
Democratic

The 77th district is located entirely within the Bronx in New York City, including parts of the community board districts of Community Board 4 and Community Board 5. The incumbent is Democrat Landon Dais, who defeated Republican Norman Sobe McGill to win a first full term with 74.25% of the vote in 2024.

=== Democratic primary ===
==== Nominee ====
- Landon Dais, incumbent assemblymember

==== Disqualified ====
- Shakur Joseph, activist

==== Endorsements ====
Landon Dais

Organizations

- Stonewall Democratic Club of New York City

==== Fundraising ====
Italics indicate a disqualified candidate.

Campaign finance reports as of October 19, 2026
Candidate	Contributions	Loans	Expenditures
Landon Dais (D)	$111,140.91	$0.00	$53,076.69
Shakur Joseph	$767.29	$0.00	$1,381.63
Source: Transparency USA

=== General election ===
==== Predictions ====
Source	Ranking	As of
State Navigate	Uncontested D	November 2, 2026

==== Fundraising ====
Campaign finance reports as of October 19, 2026
Candidate	Contributions	Loans	Expenditures
Landon Dais (D)	$111,140.91	$0.00	$53,076.69
Source: Transparency USA

==== Results ====
2026 New York's 77th State Assembly district election
Party	Candidate	Votes	%	±%
Democratic	Landon Dais (incumbent)			
Write-in				
Total votes				

== District 78 ==
2026 New York's 78th State Assembly district election
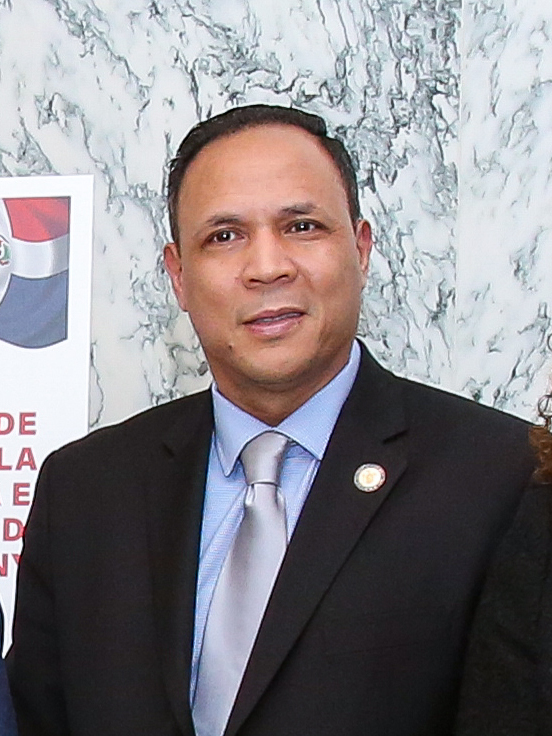
Nominee	George Alvarez
Party	Democratic
Alliance	Working Families
Incumbent Assemblymember
George Alvarez
Democratic

The 78th district is located entirely within the Bronx in New York City, including parts of the community board districts of Community Board 5, Community Board 6, Community Board 7, Community Board 8, and Community Board 11. The incumbent is Democrat George Alvarez, who defeated Republican John Santiago to win a second term with 73.33% of the vote in 2024.

=== Democratic primary ===
==== Nominee ====
- George Alvarez, incumbent assemblymember

==== Endorsements ====
George Alvarez

Organizations

- Stonewall Democratic Club of New York City

Political parties

- New York Working Families Party

=== Third parties and independents ===
==== Declared ====
- George Alvarez (Working Families), incumbent assemblymember

=== General election ===
==== Predictions ====
Source	Ranking	As of
State Navigate	Uncontested D	November 2, 2026

==== Fundraising ====
Campaign finance reports as of October 19, 2026
Candidate	Contributions	Loans	Expenditures
George Alvarez (D)	$167,305.68	$0.00	$131,148.02
Source: Transparency USA

==== Results ====
2026 New York's 78th State Assembly district election
Party	Candidate	Votes	%	±%
Democratic	George Alvarez			
Working Families	George Alvarez			
Total	George Alvarez (incumbent)			
Write-in				
Total votes				

== District 79 ==
2026 New York's 79th State Assembly district election
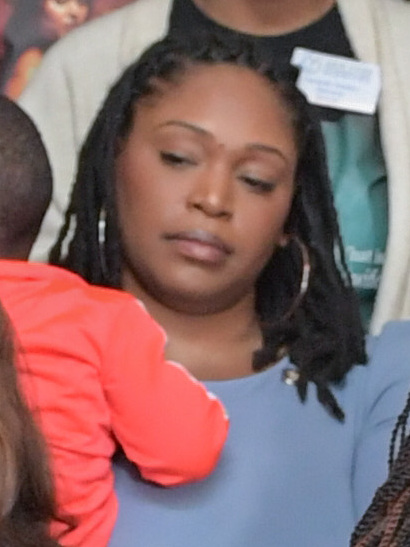

Nominee	Chantel Jackson	Emmanuel A. Findlay Jr.
Party	Democratic	Conservative
Incumbent Assemblymember
Chantel Jackson
Democratic

The 79th district is located entirely within the Bronx in New York City, including parts of the community board districts of Community Board 1, Community Board 2, Community Board 3, Community Board 4, and Community Board 6. The incumbent is Democrat Chantel Jackson, who defeated Republican Sharon Darby to win a third term with 80.09% of the vote in 2024.

=== Democratic primary ===
==== Nominee ====
- Chantel Jackson, incumbent assemblymember

=== Republican primary ===
==== Disqualified ====
- Emmanuel A. Findlay Jr., activist

=== Third parties and independents ===
==== Declared ====
- Emmanuel A. Findlay Jr. (Conservative), activist

=== General election ===
==== Predictions ====
Source	Ranking	As of
State Navigate	Solid D	November 2, 2026

==== Fundraising ====
Campaign finance reports as of October 19, 2026
Candidate	Contributions	Loans	Expenditures
Chantel Jackson (D)	$65,859.04	$0.00	$46,876.84
Emmanuel A. Findlay Jr. (C)	$0.00	$0.00	$0.00
Source: Transparency USA

==== Results ====
2026 New York's 79th State Assembly district election
Party	Candidate	Votes	%	±%
Democratic	Chantel Jackson (incumbent)			
Conservative	Emmanuel A. Findlay Jr.			
Write-in				
Total votes				

== District 80 ==
2026 New York's 80th State Assembly district election
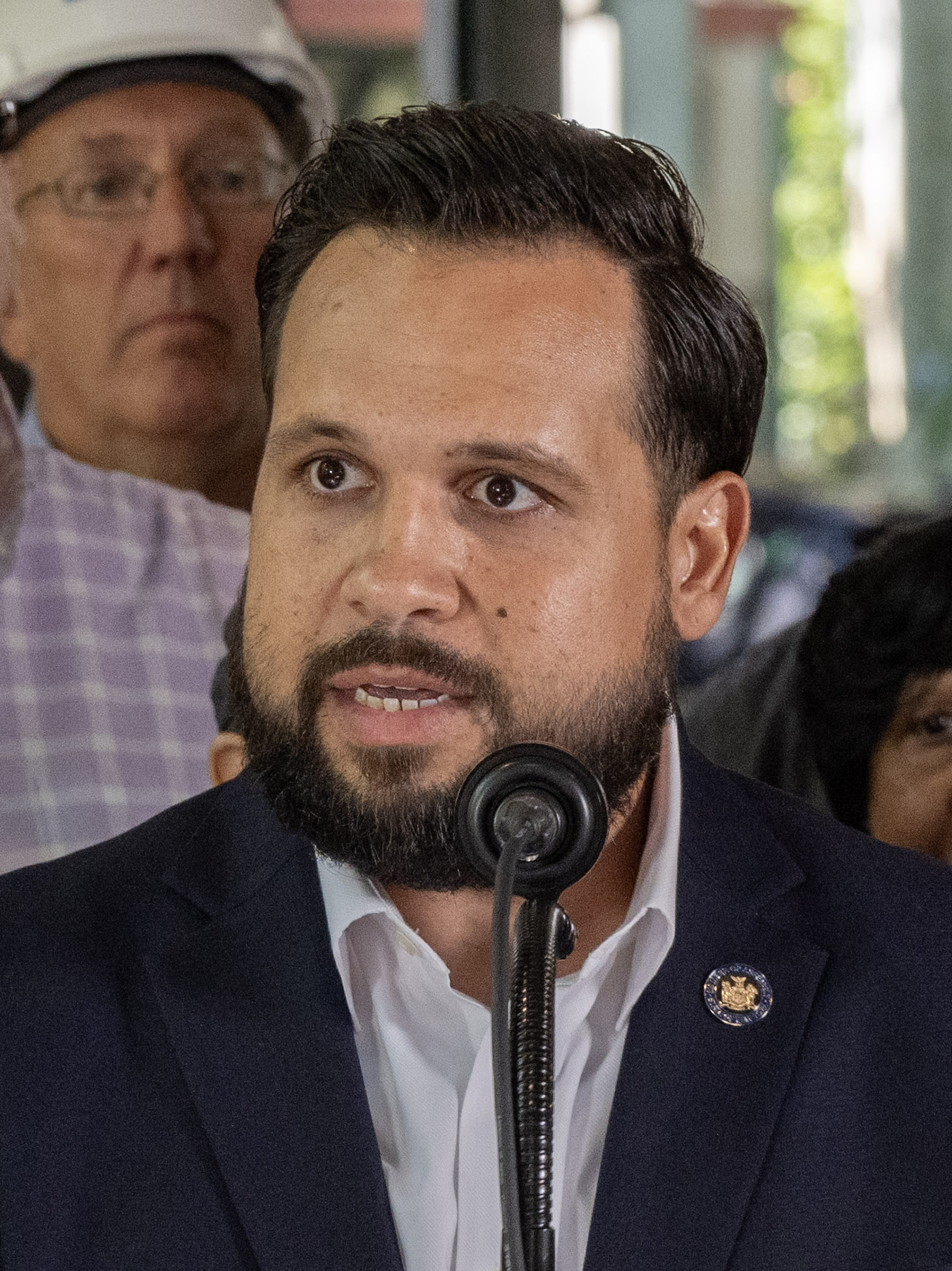

Nominee	John Zaccaro Jr.	Denise Smith
Party	Democratic	Conservative
Incumbent Assemblymember
John Zaccaro Jr.
Democratic

The 80th district is located entirely within the Bronx in New York City, including parts of the community board districts of Community Board 6, Community Board 7, Community Board 11, and Community Board 12. The incumbent is Democrat John Zaccaro Jr., who defeated Republican Nicholas Marricco to win a second term with 67.56% of the vote in 2024.

=== Democratic primary ===
==== Nominee ====
- John Zaccaro Jr., incumbent assemblymember

=== Republican primary ===
==== Disqualified ====
- Denise Smith

=== Third parties and independents ===
==== Declared ====
- Denise Smith (Conservative)

=== General election ===
==== Predictions ====
Source	Ranking	As of
State Navigate	Solid D	November 2, 2026

==== Fundraising ====
Campaign finance reports as of October 19, 2026
Candidate	Contributions	Loans	Expenditures
John Zaccaro Jr. (D)	$80,021.74	$0.00	$72,843.85
Denise Smith (C)	$0.00	$0.00	$0.00
Source: Transparency USA

==== Results ====
2026 New York's 80th State Assembly district election
Party	Candidate	Votes	%	±%
Democratic	John Zaccaro Jr. (incumbent)			
Conservative	Denise Smith			
Write-in				
Total votes				

== District 81 ==
2026 New York's 81st State Assembly district election
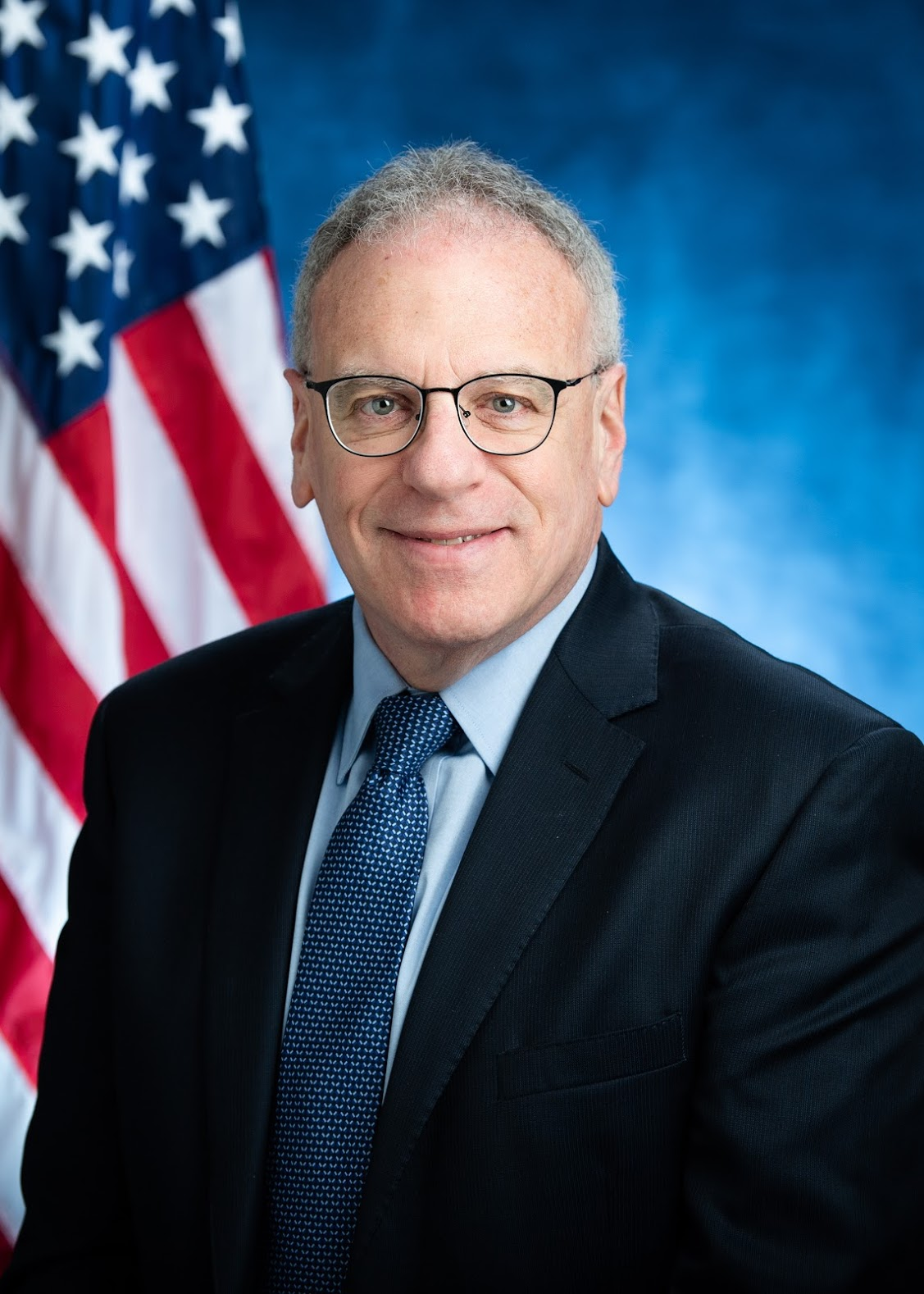
Nominee	Jeffrey Dinowitz
Party	Democratic
Incumbent Assemblymember
Jeffrey Dinowitz
Democratic

The 81st district is located entirely within the Bronx in New York City, including parts of the community board districts of Community Board 7, Community Board 8, and Community Board 12. The incumbent is Democrat Jeffrey Dinowitz, who defeated Republican Kevin Pazmino to win a sixteenth full term with 76.39% of the vote in 2024.

=== Democratic primary ===
==== Nominee ====
- Jeffrey Dinowitz, incumbent assemblymember

==== Eliminated in primary ====
- Morgan Evers, teacher

==== Endorsements ====
Jeffrey Dinowitz

Organizations

- Stonewall Democratic Club of New York City
Morgan Evers

Organizations

- Run for Something

Political parties

- New York Working Families Party

==== Fundraising ====
Campaign finance reports as of October 19, 2026
Candidate	Contributions	Loans	Expenditures
Jeffrey Dinowitz (D)	$628,981.95	$0.00	$641,127.41
Morgan Evers (D)	$234,650.43	$65,000.00	$300,303.78
Source: Transparency USA

==== Results ====
2026 New York's 81st State Assembly district Democratic primary election
Party	Candidate	Votes	%
Democratic	Jeffrey Dinowitz (incumbent)	7,791	64.68%
Democratic	Morgan Evers	4,225	35.08%
Write-in		29	0.24%
Total votes		12,045	100.00%

=== Third parties and independents ===
==== Withdrawn ====
- Morgan Evers (Working Families), teacher

=== General election ===
==== Predictions ====
Source	Ranking	As of
State Navigate	Solid D	November 2, 2026

==== Fundraising ====
Italics indicate a withdrawn candidate.

Campaign finance reports as of October 19, 2026
Candidate	Contributions	Loans	Expenditures
Jeffrey Dinowitz (D)	$628,981.95	$0.00	$641,127.41
Morgan Evers	$234,650.43	$65,000.00	$300,303.78
Source: Transparency USA

==== Results ====
2026 New York's 81st State Assembly district election
Party	Candidate	Votes	%	±%
Democratic	Jeffrey Dinowitz (incumbent)			
Write-in				
Total votes				

== District 82 ==
2026 New York's 82nd State Assembly district election

Nominee	Michael Benedetto	Irene Gail Guanill
Party	Democratic	Republican
Alliance		Conservative; Vote Affordable
Incumbent Assemblymember
Michael Benedetto
Democratic

The 82nd district is located entirely within the Bronx in New York City, including parts of the community board districts of Community Board 9, Community Board 10, Community Board 11, and Community Board 12. The incumbent is Democrat Michael Benedetto, who defeated Republican Juan De La Cruz to win an eleventh term with 68.81% of the vote in 2024.

=== Democratic primary ===
==== Nominee ====
- Michael Benedetto, incumbent assemblymember

==== Eliminated in primary ====
- Jake Martin Kuhl, assistant director of the Falk Recreation Center
- Felix Omozusi, artist

==== Endorsements ====
Michael Benedetto

Organizations

- Stonewall Democratic Club of New York City

==== Fundraising ====
Campaign finance reports as of October 19, 2026
Candidate	Contributions	Loans	Expenditures
Michael Benedetto (D)	$242,216.00	$31,000.00	$250,273.16
Jake Martin Kuhl (D)	$132,719.00	$0.00	$131,895.74
Felix Omozusi (D)	$8,720.00	$0.00	$8,298.48
Source: Transparency USA

==== Results ====
2026 New York's 82nd State Assembly district Democratic primary election
Party	Candidate	Votes	%
Democratic	Michael Benedetto (incumbent)	4,636	62.23%
Democratic	Jake Martin Kuhl	1,864	25.02%
Democratic	Felix Omozusi	911	12.23%
Write-in		39	0.52%
Total votes		7,450	100.00%

=== Republican primary ===
==== Nominee ====
- Irene Gail Guanill, real estate agent

=== Third parties and independents ===
==== Declared ====
- Irene Gail Guanill (Conservative/Vote Affordable), real estate agent

=== General election ===
==== Predictions ====
Source	Ranking	As of
State Navigate	Solid D	November 2, 2026

==== Fundraising ====
Campaign finance reports as of October 19, 2026
Candidate	Contributions	Loans	Expenditures
Michael Benedetto (D)	$242,216.00	$31,000.00	$250,273.16
Irene Gail Guanill (R)	$97,132.56	$0.00	$65,828.46
Source: Transparency USA

==== Results ====
2026 New York's 82nd State Assembly district election
Party	Candidate	Votes	%	±%
Democratic	Michael Benedetto (incumbent)			
Republican	Irene Gail Guanill			
Conservative	Irene Gail Guanill			
Vote Affordable	Irene Gail Guanill			
Total	Irene Gail Guanill			
Write-in				
Total votes				

== District 83 ==
2026 New York's 83rd State Assembly district election
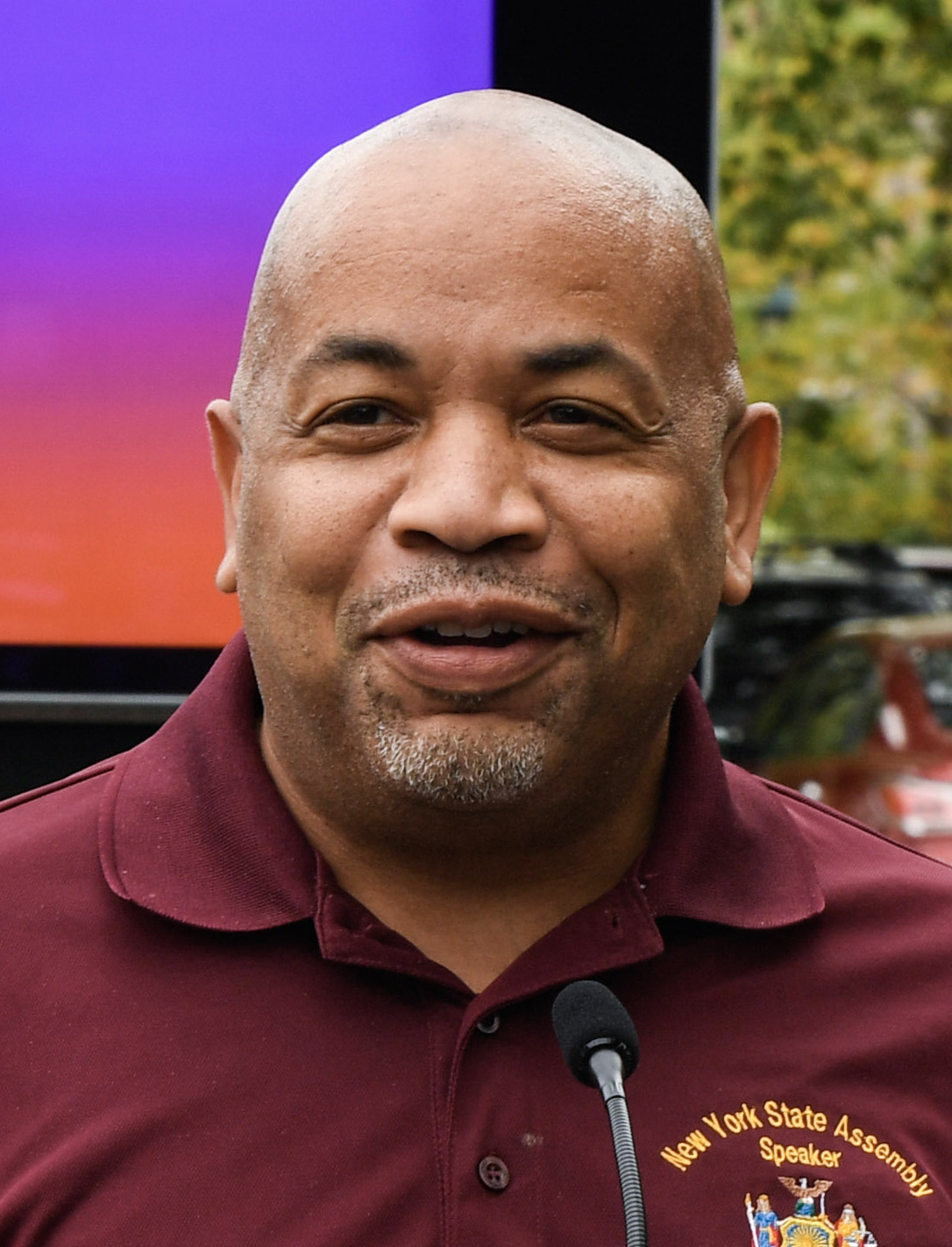

Nominee	Carl Heastie	James Washington-Ward
Party	Democratic	Conservative
Incumbent Assemblymember
Carl Heastie
Democratic

The 83rd district is located entirely within the Bronx in New York City, including parts of the community board districts of Community Board 11 and Community Board 12. The incumbent is Democrat Carl Heastie, who defeated Republican Stephanie Liggio to win a thirteenth term with 88.41% of the vote in 2024.

=== Democratic primary ===
==== Nominee ====
- Carl Heastie, incumbent assemblymember

==== Endorsements ====
Carl Heastie

Organizations

- Stonewall Democratic Club of New York City

=== Republican primary ===
==== Disqualified ====
- James Washington-Ward, Conservative nominee for New York City's 12th City Council district in 2025

=== Third parties and independents ===
==== Declared ====
- James Washington-Ward (Conservative), nominee for New York City's 12th City Council district in 2025

=== General election ===
==== Predictions ====
Source	Ranking	As of
State Navigate	Solid D	November 2, 2026

==== Fundraising ====
Campaign finance reports as of October 19, 2026
Candidate	Contributions	Loans	Expenditures
Carl Heastie (D)	$449,663.94	$0.00	$585,429.65
James Washington-Ward (C)	$0.00	$0.00	$0.00
Source: Transparency USA

==== Results ====
2026 New York's 83rd State Assembly district election
Party	Candidate	Votes	%	±%
Democratic	Carl Heastie (incumbent)			
Conservative	James Washington-Ward			
Write-in				
Total votes				

== District 84 ==
2026 New York's 84th State Assembly district election
Nominee	Amanda Septimo	Tyreek Goodman
Party	Democratic	Conservative
Alliance	Working Families
Incumbent Assemblymember
Amanda Septimo
Democratic

The 84th district is located entirely within the Bronx in New York City, including parts of the community board districts of Community Board 1, Community Board 2, and Community Board 4. The incumbent is Democrat Amanda Septimo, who defeated Republican Rosaline Nieves to win a third term with 76.76% of the vote in 2024.

On December 11, 2025, Septimo announced that she would run for the United States House of Representatives in New York's 15th district to challenge three-term Democratic incumbent Ritchie Torres. Septimo suspended her congressional campaign and announced that she would run for a fourth term in the Assembly on January 16, 2026, after she was diagnosed with Lupus.

=== Democratic primary ===
==== Nominee ====
- Amanda Septimo, incumbent assemblymember (previously ran for United States House of Representatives)

==== Eliminated in primary ====
- Hector Feliciano, director of the Boricua College college preparatory program
- Courtland W. Hankins, community coordinator for Bronx Community Board 3

==== Endorsements ====
Courtland W. Hankins

Organizations

- Stonewall Democratic Club of New York City
Amanda Septimo

Political parties

- New York Working Families Party

==== Fundraising ====
Campaign finance reports as of October 19, 2026
Candidate	Contributions	Loans	Expenditures
Amanda Septimo (D)	$29,300.00	$0.00	$6,153.06
Hector Feliciano (D)	$0.00	$0.00	$0.00
Courtland W. Hankins (D)	$10,753.20	$9,500.00	$17,319.49
Source: Transparency USA

==== Results ====
2026 New York's 84th State Assembly district Democratic primary election
Party	Candidate	Votes	%
Democratic	Amanda Septimo (incumbent)	2,494	59.67%
Democratic	Hector Feliciano	888	21.24%
Democratic	Courtland W. Hankins	777	18.59%
Write-in		21	0.50%
Total votes		4,180	100.00%

=== Republican primary ===
==== Disqualified ====
- Tyreek Goodman, activist

=== Third parties and independents ===
==== Declared ====
- Tyreek Goodman (Conservative), activist
- Amanda Septimo (Working Families), incumbent assemblymember (previously ran for United States House of Representatives)

=== General election ===
==== Predictions ====
Source	Ranking	As of
State Navigate	Solid D	November 2, 2026

==== Fundraising ====
Campaign finance reports as of October 19, 2026
Candidate	Contributions	Loans	Expenditures
Amanda Septimo (D)	$29,300.00	$0.00	$6,153.06
Tyreek Goodman (C)	$0.00	$0.00	$0.00
Source: Transparency USA

==== Results ====
2026 New York's 84th State Assembly district election
Party	Candidate	Votes	%	±%
Democratic	Amanda Septimo			
Working Families	Amanda Septimo			
Total	Amanda Septimo (incumbent)			
Conservative	Tyreek Goodman			
Write-in				
Total votes				

== District 85 ==
2026 New York's 85th State Assembly district election
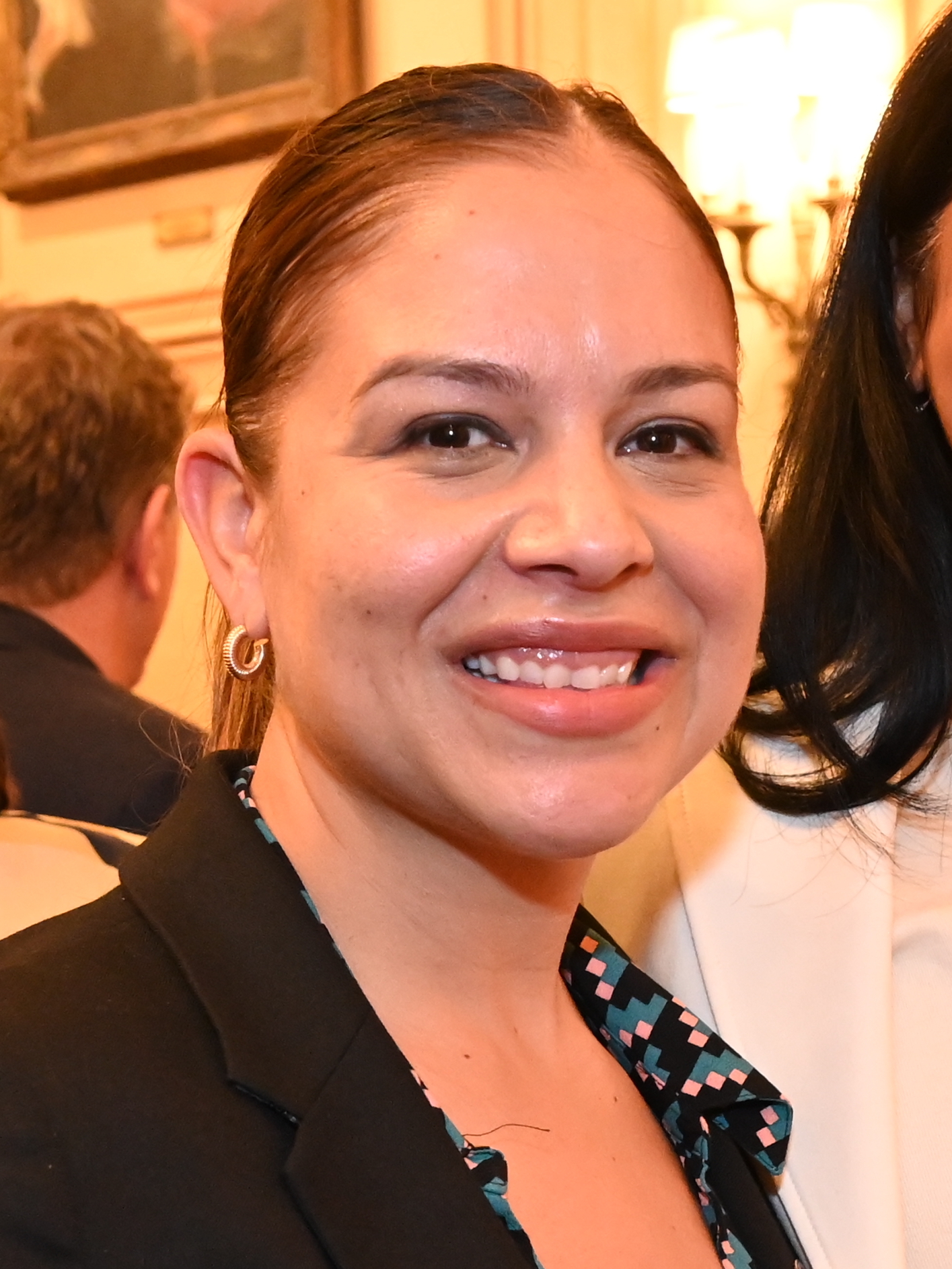
Nominee	Emerita Torres
Party	Democratic
Alliance	Working Families
Incumbent Assemblymember
Emerita Torres
Democratic

The 85th district is located entirely within the Bronx in New York City, including parts of the community board districts of Bronx Community Board 1, Bronx Community Board 2, Bronx Community Board 3, Bronx Community Board 9, and Queens Community Board 1. The incumbent is Democrat Emerita Torres, who defeated Republican Kelly Atkinson to fill the vacancy of one-full-term Democratic incumbent Kenny Burgos, who resigned on July 19, 2024, for personal reasons, with 78.87% of the vote in 2024.

=== Democratic primary ===
==== Nominee ====
- Emerita Torres, incumbent assemblymember

==== Endorsements ====
Emerita Torres

Organizations

- Stonewall Democratic Club of New York City

Political parties

- New York Working Families Party

=== Third parties and independents ===
==== Declared ====
- Emerita Torres (Working Families), incumbent assemblymember

=== General election ===
==== Predictions ====
Source	Ranking	As of
State Navigate	Uncontested D	November 2, 2026

==== Fundraising ====
Campaign finance reports as of October 19, 2026
Candidate	Contributions	Loans	Expenditures
Emerita Torres (D)	$98,979.41	$0.00	$94,235.86
Source: Transparency USA

==== Results ====
2026 New York's 85th State Assembly district election
Party	Candidate	Votes	%	±%
Democratic	Emerita Torres			
Working Families	Emerita Torres			
Total	Emerita Torres (incumbent)			
Write-in				
Total votes				

== District 86 ==
2026 New York's 86th State Assembly district election
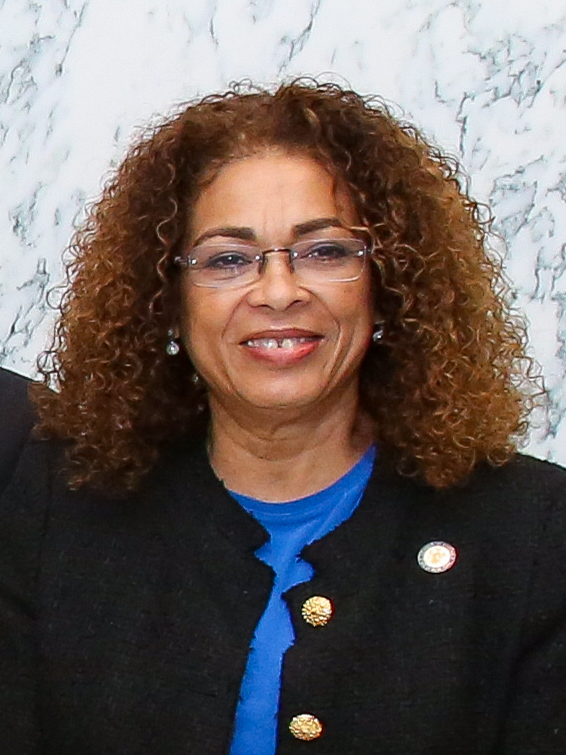

Nominee	Yudelka Tapia	Maria Diaz	Shery A. Olivo
Party	Democratic	Republican	Conservative
Incumbent Assemblymember
Yudelka Tapia
Democratic

The 86th district is located entirely within the Bronx in New York City, including parts of the community board districts of Community Board 4, Community Board 5, Community Board 6, and Community Board 7. The incumbent is Democrat Yudelka Tapia, who defeated Republican Woodrow Hines Jr. to win a second full term with 74.41% of the vote in 2024.

=== Democratic primary ===
==== Nominee ====
- Yudelka Tapia, incumbent assemblymember

=== Republican primary ===
==== Nominee ====
- Maria Diaz

==== Eliminated in primary ====
- Shery A. Olivo, activist

==== Fundraising ====
Campaign finance reports as of October 19, 2026
Candidate	Contributions	Loans	Expenditures
Maria Diaz (R)	$0.00	$0.00	$0.00
Shery A. Olivo (R)	$13,920.59	$10,000.00	$51,926.02
Source: Transparency USA

==== Results ====
2026 New York's 86th State Assembly district Republican primary election
Party	Candidate	Votes	%
Republican	Maria Diaz	122	59.22%
Republican	Shery A. Olivo	76	36.89%
Write-in		8	3.88%
Total votes		206	100.00%

=== Third parties and independents ===
==== Declared ====
- Shery A. Olivo (Conservative), activist

=== General election ===
==== Predictions ====
Source	Ranking	As of
State Navigate	Solid D	November 2, 2026

==== Fundraising ====
Campaign finance reports as of October 19, 2026
Candidate	Contributions	Loans	Expenditures
Yudelka Tapia (D)	$131,466.69	$0.00	$64,224.60
Maria Diaz (R)	$0.00	$0.00	$0.00
Shery A. Olivo (C)	$13,920.59	$10,000.00	$51,926.02
Source: Transparency USA

==== Results ====
2026 New York's 86th State Assembly district election
Party	Candidate	Votes	%	±%
Democratic	Yudelka Tapia (incumbent)			
Republican	Maria Diaz			
Conservative	Shery A. Olivo			
Write-in				
Total votes				

== District 87 ==
2026 New York's 87th State Assembly district election
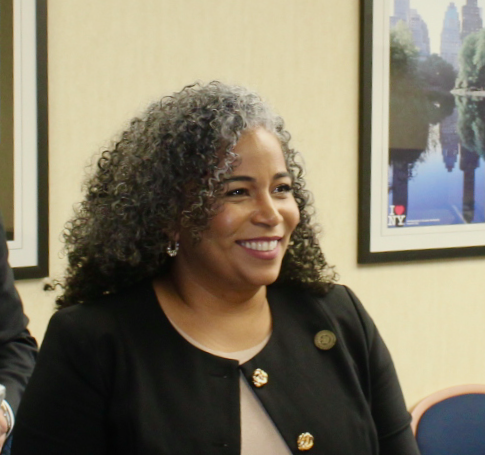

Nominee	Karines Reyes	Zenobia Merced-Bonilla	Zakir Choudhury
Party	Democratic	Conservative	People First
Alliance	Working Families
Incumbent Assemblymember
Karines Reyes
Democratic

The 87th district is located entirely within the Bronx in New York City, including parts of the community board districts of Community Board 6, Community Board 9, Community Board 10, and Community Board 11. The incumbent is Democrat Karines Reyes, who ran unopposed to win a fourth term with 99.2% of the vote in 2024.

=== Democratic primary ===
==== Nominee ====
- Karines Reyes, incumbent assemblymember

==== Eliminated in primary ====
- Zakir Choudhury

==== Endorsements ====
Karines Reyes

Organizations

- DRUM Beats
- Stonewall Democratic Club of New York City

Political parties

- New York Working Families Party

==== Fundraising ====
Campaign finance reports as of October 19, 2026
Candidate	Contributions	Loans	Expenditures
Karines Reyes (D)	$324,368.12	$0.00	$350,919.90
Zakir Choudhury (D)	$49,408.50	$8,000.00	$184,288.67
Source: Transparency USA

==== Results ====
2026 New York's 87th State Assembly district Democratic primary election
Party	Candidate	Votes	%
Democratic	Karines Reyes (incumbent)	4,221	71.63%
Democratic	Zakir Choudhury	1,654	28.07%
Write-in		18	0.31%
Total votes		5,893	100.00%

=== Third parties and independents ===
==== Declared ====
- Zenobia Merced-Bonilla (Conservative)
- Karines Reyes (Working Families), incumbent assemblymember
- Zakir Choudhury (People First)

=== General election ===
==== Predictions ====
Source	Ranking	As of
State Navigate	Solid D	November 2, 2026

==== Fundraising ====
Campaign finance reports as of October 19, 2026
Candidate	Contributions	Loans	Expenditures
Karines Reyes (D)	$324,368.12	$0.00	$350,919.90
Zenobia Merced-Bonilla (C)	$0.00	$0.00	$0.00
Zakir Choudhury (I)	$49,408.50	$8,000.00	$184,288.67
Source: Transparency USA

==== Results ====
2026 New York's 87th State Assembly district election
Party	Candidate	Votes	%	±%
Democratic	Karines Reyes			
Working Families	Karines Reyes			
Total	Karines Reyes (incumbent)			
Conservative	Zenobia Merced-Bonilla			
People First	Zakir Choudhury			
Write-in				
Total votes				

== District 88 ==
2026 New York's 88th State Assembly district election
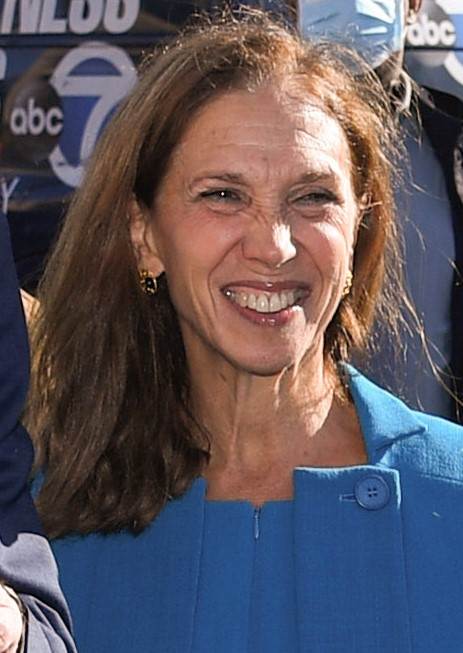
Nominee	Amy Paulin
Party	Democratic
Alliance	Working Families
Incumbent Assemblymember
Amy Paulin
Democratic

The 88th district is located entirely within Westchester County, including the towns of Eastchester, Pelham, Scarsdale, parts of the cities of New Rochelle and White Plains, and parts of the town of Greenburgh. The incumbent is Democrat Amy Paulin, who defeated Republican Thomas H. Fix Jr. to win a thirteenth term with 65.1% of the vote in 2024.

=== Democratic primary ===
==== Nominee ====
- Amy Paulin, incumbent assemblymember

==== Endorsements ====
Amy Paulin

Political parties

- New York Working Families Party

=== Republican primary ===
==== Disqualified ====
- Lenny Lolis, nominee for mayor of White Plains in 2025

=== Third parties and independents ===
==== Declared ====
- Amy Paulin (Working Families), incumbent assemblymember

=== General election ===
==== Predictions ====
Source	Ranking	As of
State Navigate	Uncontested D	November 2, 2026

==== Fundraising ====
Italics indicate a disqualified candidate.

Campaign finance reports as of October 19, 2026
Candidate	Contributions	Loans	Expenditures
Amy Paulin (D)	$330,030.59	$0.00	$345,423.44
Lenny Lolis	$25,547.25	$0.00	$18,508.58
Source: Transparency USA

==== Results ====
2026 New York's 88th State Assembly district election
Party	Candidate	Votes	%	±%
Democratic	Amy Paulin			
Working Families	Amy Paulin			
Total	Amy Paulin (incumbent)			
Write-in				
Total votes				

== District 89 ==
2026 New York's 89th State Assembly district election
Nominee	J. Gary Pretlow
Party	Democratic
Incumbent Assemblymember
J. Gary Pretlow
Democratic

The 89th district is located entirely within Westchester County, including the city of Mount Vernon and parts of the city of Yonkers. The incumbent is Democrat J. Gary Pretlow, who ran unopposed to win a seventeenth term with 99.78% of the vote in 2024.

=== Democratic primary ===
==== Nominee ====
- J. Gary Pretlow, incumbent assemblymember

=== Republican primary ===
==== Disqualified ====
- Brandon J. Neider, community and union leader

=== General election ===
==== Predictions ====
Source	Ranking	As of
State Navigate	Uncontested D	November 2, 2026

==== Fundraising ====
Italics indicate a disqualified candidate.

Campaign finance reports as of October 19, 2026
Candidate	Contributions	Loans	Expenditures
J. Gary Pretlow (D)	$146,850.14	$0.00	$157,171.44
Brandon J. Neider	$8,267.00	$0.00	$5,422.05
Source: Transparency USA

==== Results ====
2026 New York's 89th State Assembly district election
Party	Candidate	Votes	%	±%
Democratic	J. Gary Pretlow (incumbent)			
Write-in				
Total votes				

== District 90 ==
2026 New York's 90th State Assembly district election
Nominee	Frank Jereis	John Isaac Nichols
Party	Democratic	Republican
Incumbent Assemblymember
Nader Sayegh
Democratic

The 90th district is located entirely within Westchester County, including parts of the city of Yonkers. The incumbent is Democrat Nader Sayegh, who defeated Republican John Isaac Nichols to win a fourth term with 56.43% of the vote in 2024.

On January 10, 2026, Sayegh announced he would not run for re-election to a fifth term.

=== Democratic primary ===
==== Nominee ====
- Frank Jereis, chief of staff for state assemblymember Nader Sayegh

==== Eliminated in primary ====
- Jeannette M. Garcia, attorney

==== Declined ====
- Nader Sayegh, incumbent assemblymember

==== Endorsements ====
Jeannette M. Garcia

Organizations

- Run for Something

Political parties

- New York Working Families Party

==== Fundraising ====
Campaign finance reports as of October 19, 2026
Candidate	Contributions	Loans	Expenditures
Frank Jereis (D)	$521,656.00	$0.00	$424,492.61
Jeannette M. Garcia (D)	$126,057.75	$9,000.00	$134,406.98
Source: Transparency USA

==== Results ====
2026 New York's 90th State Assembly district Democratic primary election
Party	Candidate	Votes	%
Democratic	Frank Jereis	2,826	57.09%
Democratic	Jeannette M. Garcia	2,122	42.87%
Write-in		2	0.04%
Total votes		4,950	100.00%

=== Republican primary ===
==== Nominee ====
- John Isaac Nichols, nominee for this district in 2024

=== Third parties and independents ===
==== Withdrawn ====
- Jeannette M. Garcia (Working Families), attorney

=== General election ===
==== Predictions ====
Source	Ranking	As of
State Navigate	Very Likely D	November 2, 2026

==== Fundraising ====
Italics indicate a withdrawn candidate.

Campaign finance reports as of October 19, 2026
Candidate	Contributions	Loans	Expenditures
Frank Jereis (D)	$521,656.00	$0.00	$424,492.61
John Isaac Nichols (R)	$190,744.86	$10,000.00	$184,074.32
Jeannette M. Garcia	$126,057.75	$9,000.00	$134,406.98
Source: Transparency USA

==== Results ====
2026 New York's 90th State Assembly district election
Party	Candidate	Votes	%	±%
Democratic	Frank Jereis			
Republican	John Isaac Nichols			
Write-in				
Total votes				

== District 91 ==
2026 New York's 91st State Assembly district election
Nominee	Steven Otis
Party	Democratic
Alliance	Working Families
Incumbent Assemblymember
Steven Otis
Democratic

The 91st district is located entirely within Westchester County, including the city of Rye, the towns of Mamaroneck and Rye, and parts of the city of New Rochelle. The incumbent is Democrat Steven Otis, who defeated Republican Katie Manger to win a seventh term with 66.93% of the vote in 2024.

=== Democratic primary ===
==== Nominee ====
- Steven Otis, incumbent assemblymember

==== Endorsements ====
Steven Otis

Political parties

- New York Working Families Party

=== Third parties and independents ===
==== Declared ====
- Steven Otis (Working Families), incumbent assemblymember

=== General election ===
==== Predictions ====
Source	Ranking	As of
State Navigate	Uncontested D	November 2, 2026

==== Fundraising ====
Campaign finance reports as of October 19, 2026
Candidate	Contributions	Loans	Expenditures
Steven Otis (D)	$45,285.00	$0.00	$40,605.22
Source: Transparency USA

==== Results ====
2026 New York's 91st State Assembly district election
Party	Candidate	Votes	%	±%
Democratic	Steven Otis			
Working Families	Steven Otis			
Total	Steven Otis (incumbent)			
Write-in				
Total votes				

== District 92 ==
2026 New York's 92nd State Assembly district election
Nominee	MaryJane Shimsky	Bob Welch
Party	Democratic	Republican
Alliance	Working Families	Conservative
Incumbent Assemblymember
MaryJane Shimsky
Democratic

The 92nd district is located entirely within Westchester County, including the town of Mount Pleasant, parts of the city of Yonkers, and parts of the town of Greenburgh. The incumbent is Democrat MaryJane Shimsky, who defeated Republican Alessandro Crocco to win a second term with 65.73% of the vote in 2024.

=== Democratic primary ===
==== Nominee ====
- MaryJane Shimsky, incumbent assemblymember

==== Endorsements ====
MaryJane Shimsky

Political parties

- New York Working Families Party

=== Republican primary ===
==== Nominee ====
- Bob Welch

=== Third parties and independents ===
==== Declared ====
- Bob Welch (Conservative)
- MaryJane Shimsky (Working Families), incumbent assemblymember

=== General election ===
==== Predictions ====
Source	Ranking	As of
State Navigate	Solid D	November 2, 2026

==== Fundraising ====
Campaign finance reports as of October 19, 2026
Candidate	Contributions	Loans	Expenditures
MaryJane Shimsky (D)	$229,700.70	$2,000.00	$56,912.68
Bob Welch (R)	$105,286.93	$0.00	$3,689.61
Source: Transparency USA

==== Results ====
2026 New York's 92nd State Assembly district election
Party	Candidate	Votes	%	±%
Democratic	MaryJane Shimsky			
Working Families	MaryJane Shimsky			
Total	MaryJane Shimsky (incumbent)			
Republican	Bob Welch			
Conservative	Bob Welch			
Total	Bob Welch			
Write-in				
Total votes				

== District 93 ==
2026 New York's 93rd State Assembly district election
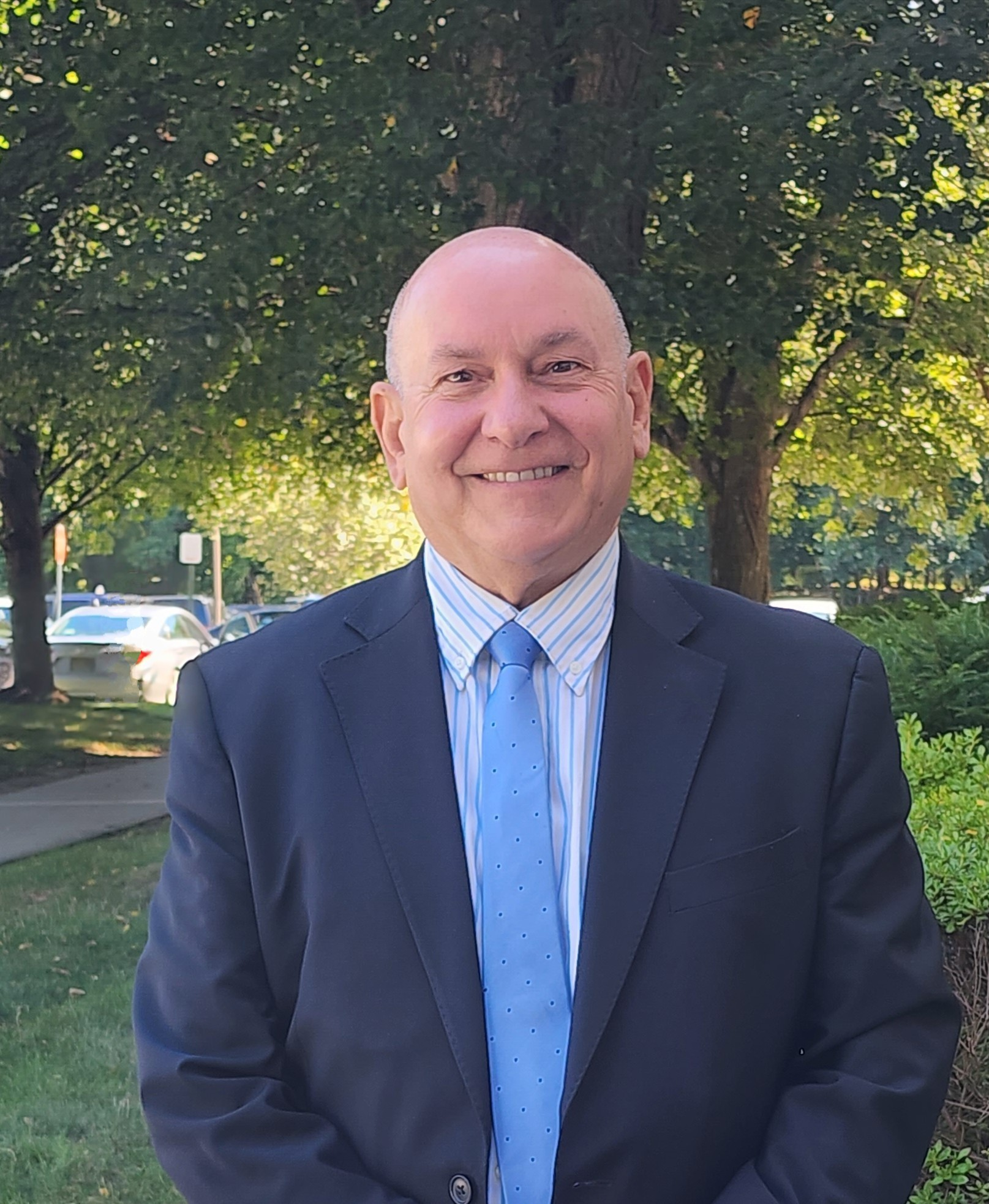

Nominee	Chris Burdick	Braille A. Diaz
Party	Democratic	Republican
Alliance		Conservative
Incumbent Assemblymember
Chris Burdick
Democratic

The 93rd district is located entirely within Westchester County, including the towns of Bedford, Harrison, Lewisboro, Mount Kisco, New Castle, North Castle, North Salem, Pound Ridge, and parts of the city of White Plains. The incumbent is Democrat Chris Burdick, who ran unopposed to win a third term with 99.67% of the vote in 2024.

=== Democratic primary ===
==== Nominee ====
- Chris Burdick, incumbent assemblymember

=== Republican primary ===
==== Nominee ====
- Braille A. Diaz

=== Third parties and independents ===
==== Declared ====
- Braille A. Diaz (Conservative)

=== General election ===
==== Predictions ====
Source	Ranking	As of
State Navigate	Solid D	November 2, 2026

==== Fundraising ====
Campaign finance reports as of October 19, 2026
Candidate	Contributions	Loans	Expenditures
Chris Burdick (D)	$291,405.72	$0.00	$226,916.04
Braille A. Diaz (R)	$0.00	$0.00	$0.00
Source: Transparency USA

==== Results ====
2026 New York's 93rd State Assembly district election
Party	Candidate	Votes	%	±%
Democratic	Chris Burdick (incumbent)			
Republican	Braille A. Diaz			
Conservative	Braille A. Diaz			
Total	Braille A. Diaz			
Write-in				
Total votes				

== District 94 ==
2026 New York's 94th State Assembly district election
Nominee	Matt Slater	Daniel Guzman
Party	Republican	Democratic
Alliance	Conservative
Incumbent Assemblymember
Matt Slater
Republican

The 94th district is located within Putnam and Westchester counties, including the towns of Carmel, Kent, Patterson, Putnam Valley, and Southeast in Putnam County, and the towns of Somers and parts of Yorktown in Westchester County. The incumbent is Republican Matt Slater, who defeated Democrat Zachary C. Couzens to win a second term with 62.55% of the vote in 2024.

=== Republican primary ===
==== Nominee ====
- Matt Slater, incumbent assemblymember

=== Democratic primary ===
==== Nominee ====
- Daniel Guzman

=== Third parties and independents ===
==== Declared ====
- Matt Slater (Conservative), incumbent assemblymember

==== Disqualified ====
- Daniel Guzman (Unidos For All)

=== General election ===
==== Predictions ====
Source	Ranking	As of
State Navigate	Solid R	November 2, 2026

==== Fundraising ====
Campaign finance reports as of October 19, 2026
Candidate	Contributions	Loans	Expenditures
Matt Slater (R)	$466,841.09	$0.00	$382,267.19
Daniel Guzman (D)	$11,365.30	$0.00	$5,633.56
Source: Transparency USA

==== Results ====
2026 New York's 94th State Assembly district election
Party	Candidate	Votes	%	±%
Republican	Matt Slater			
Conservative	Matt Slater			
Total	Matt Slater (incumbent)			
Democratic	Daniel Guzman			
Write-in				
Total votes				

== District 95 ==
2026 New York's 95th State Assembly district election
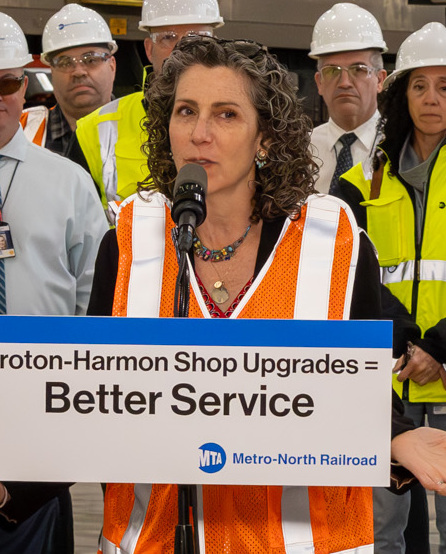

Nominee	Dana Levenberg	Laurie Ryan
Party	Democratic	Republican
Alliance	Working Families	Conservative
Incumbent Assemblymember
Dana Levenberg
Democratic

The 95th district is located within Putnam and Westchester counties, including the town of Philipstown in Putnam County, and the city of Peekskill, the towns of Cortlandt and Ossining, and parts of the town of Yorktown in Westchester County. The incumbent is Democrat Dana Levenberg, who defeated Republican Michael L. Capalbo to win a second term with 63.79% of the vote in 2024.

=== Democratic primary ===
==== Nominee ====
- Dana Levenberg, incumbent assemblymember

==== Endorsements ====
Dana Levenberg

Political parties

- New York Working Families Party

=== Republican primary ===
==== Nominee ====
- Laurie Ryan

=== Third parties and independents ===
==== Declared ====
- Laurie Ryan (Conservative)
- Dana Levenberg (Working Families), incumbent assemblymember

==== Disqualified ====
- Laurie Ryan (Vote Affordable)

=== General election ===
==== Predictions ====
Source	Ranking	As of
State Navigate	Solid D	November 2, 2026

==== Fundraising ====
Campaign finance reports as of October 19, 2026
Candidate	Contributions	Loans	Expenditures
Dana Levenberg (D)	$401,995.19	$0.00	$297,677.14
Laurie Ryan (R)	$23,059.33	$0.00	$9,688.32
Source: Transparency USA

==== Results ====
2026 New York's 95th State Assembly district election
Party	Candidate	Votes	%	±%
Democratic	Dana Levenberg			
Working Families	Dana Levenberg			
Total	Dana Levenberg (incumbent)			
Republican	Laurie Ryan			
Conservative	Laurie Ryan			
Total	Laurie Ryan			
Write-in				
Total votes				

== District 96 ==
2026 New York's 96th State Assembly district election
Nominee	Patrick Carroll	Brett L. Yagel
Party	Democratic	Republican
Alliance	Working Families	Conservative
Incumbent Assemblymember
Patrick Carroll
Democratic

The 96th district is located entirely within Rockland County, including the towns of Clarkstown, Haverstraw, and parts of Orangetown. The incumbent is Democrat Patrick Carroll, who defeated Republican Ronald D. Diz to fill the vacancy of seven-full-term Democratic incumbent Kenneth Zebrowski Jr., who resigned on July 10, 2024, with 58.82% of the vote in 2024.

=== Democratic primary ===
==== Nominee ====
- Patrick Carroll, incumbent assemblymember

==== Eliminated in primary ====
- P. T. Thomas

==== Endorsements ====
Patrick Carroll

Political parties

- New York Working Families Party

==== Fundraising ====
Campaign finance reports as of October 19, 2026
Candidate	Contributions	Loans	Expenditures
Patrick Carroll (D)	$337,114.56	$0.00	$214,944.85
P. T. Thomas (D)	$128,605.00	$18,000.00	$142,080.97
Source: Transparency USA

==== Results ====
2026 New York's 96th State Assembly district Democratic primary election
Party	Candidate	Votes	%
Democratic	Patrick Carroll (incumbent)	6,745	80.50%
Democratic	P. T. Thomas	1,618	19.31%
Write-in		16	0.19%
Total votes		8,379	100.00%

=== Republican primary ===
==== Nominee ====
- Brett L. Yagel, former mayor of Pomona

=== Third parties and independents ===
==== Declared ====
- Brett L. Yagel (Conservative), former mayor of Pomona
- Patrick Carroll (Working Families), incumbent assemblymember

=== General election ===
==== Predictions ====
Source	Ranking	As of
State Navigate	Solid D	November 2, 2026

==== Fundraising ====
Campaign finance reports as of October 19, 2026
Candidate	Contributions	Loans	Expenditures
Patrick Carroll (D)	$337,114.56	$0.00	$214,944.85
Brett L. Yagel (R)	$70,597.00	$0.00	$66,157.37
Source: Transparency USA

==== Results ====
2026 New York's 96th State Assembly district election
Party	Candidate	Votes	%	±%
Democratic	Patrick Carroll			
Working Families	Patrick Carroll			
Total	Patrick Carroll (incumbent)			
Republican	Brett L. Yagel			
Conservative	Brett L. Yagel			
Total	Brett L. Yagel			
Write-in				
Total votes				

== District 97 ==
2026 New York's 97th State Assembly district election
Nominee	Aron Wieder	Robert Bonomolo Jr.	Abraham Klein
Party	Democratic	Republican	Conservative
Incumbent Assemblymember
Aron Wieder
Democratic

The 97th district is located entirely within Rockland County, including parts of the towns of Orangetown and Ramapo. The incumbent is Democrat Aron Wieder, who defeated one-term Republican incumbent John W. McGowan with 51.91% of the vote in 2024.

=== Democratic primary ===
==== Nominee ====
- Aron Wieder, incumbent assemblymember

=== Republican primary ===
==== Nominee ====
- Robert Bonomolo Jr., member of the Orangetown zoning board of appeals

=== Third parties and independents ===
==== Declared ====
- Abraham Klein (Conservative), rabbi

==== Eliminated in primary ====
- Robert Bonomolo Jr. (Conservative), member of the Orangetown zoning board of appeals

==== Disqualified ====
- Lawrence G. McGee (Working Families)
- Sloma Teitelbaum (Working Families)

==== Fundraising ====
Italics indicate a disqualified candidate.

Campaign finance reports as of October 19, 2026
Candidate	Contributions	Loans	Expenditures
Abraham Klein (C)	$0.00	$0.00	$0.00
Robert Bonomolo Jr. (C)	$234,907.07	$0.00	$196,289.60
Source: Transparency USA

Campaign finance reports as of October 19, 2026
Candidate	Contributions	Loans	Expenditures
Lawrence G. McGee	$0.00	$0.00	$0.00
Sloma Teitelbaum	$0.00	$0.00	$0.00
Source: Transparency USA

==== Results ====
2026 New York's 97th State Assembly district Conservative primary election
Party	Candidate	Votes	%
Conservative	Abraham Klein	399	57.91%
Conservative	Robert Bonomolo Jr.	290	42.09%
Total votes		689	100.00%

=== General election ===
==== Predictions ====
Source	Ranking	As of
State Navigate	Lean D	November 2, 2026

==== Fundraising ====
Campaign finance reports as of October 19, 2026
Candidate	Contributions	Loans	Expenditures
Aron Wieder (D)	$143,870.23	$0.00	$37,581.01
Robert Bonomolo Jr. (R)	$234,907.07	$0.00	$196,289.60
Abraham Klein (C)	$0.00	$0.00	$0.00
Source: Transparency USA

==== Results ====
2026 New York's 97th State Assembly district election
Party	Candidate	Votes	%	±%
Democratic	Aron Wieder (incumbent)			
Republican	Robert Bonomolo Jr.			
Conservative	Abraham Klein			
Write-in				
Total votes				

== District 98 ==
2026 New York's 98th State Assembly district election
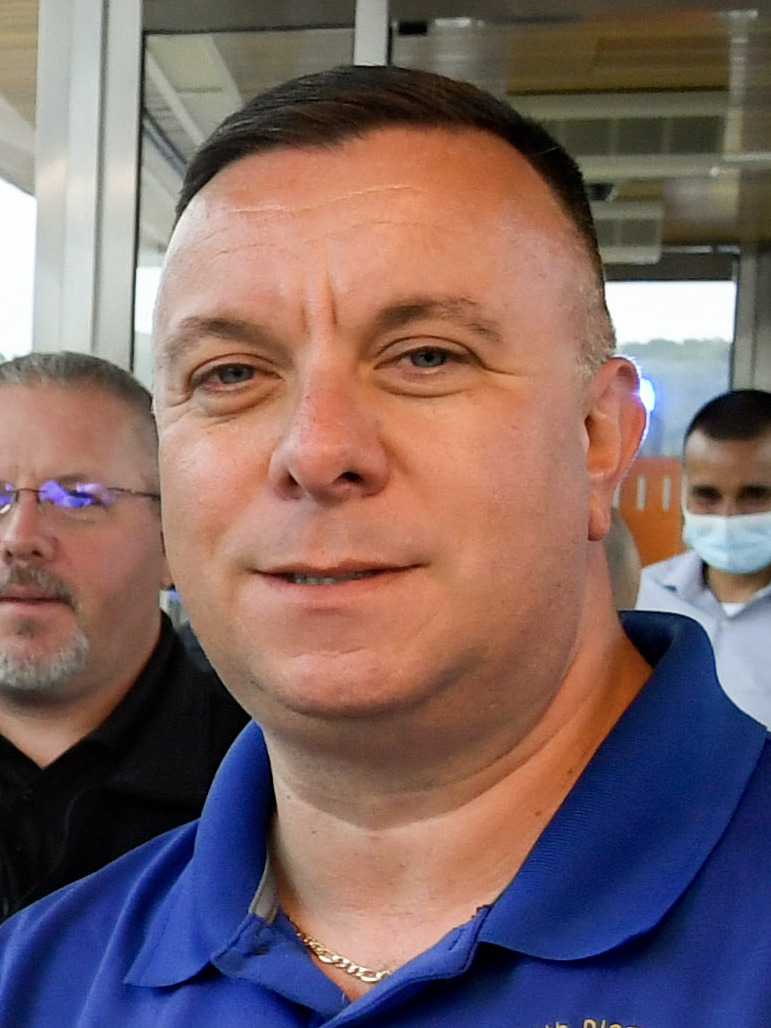
Nominee	Karl A. Brabenec
Party	Republican
Alliance	Conservative
Incumbent Assemblymember
Karl A. Brabenec
Republican

The 98th district is located within Orange and Rockland counties, including the city of Port Jervis and the towns of Deerpark, Greenville, Minisink, Mount Hope, Tuxedo, Warwick, Wawayanda, and parts of the town of Monroe in Orange County, and parts of the town of Ramapo in Rockland County. The incumbent is Republican Karl A. Brabenec, who ran unopposed to win a sixth term with 99% of the vote in 2024.

=== Republican primary ===
==== Nominee ====
- Karl A. Brabenec, incumbent assemblymember

=== Third parties and independents ===
==== Declared ====
- Karl A. Brabenec (Conservative), incumbent assemblymember

=== General election ===
==== Predictions ====
Source	Ranking	As of
State Navigate	Uncontested R	November 2, 2026

==== Fundraising ====
Campaign finance reports as of October 19, 2026
Candidate	Contributions	Loans	Expenditures
Karl A. Brabenec (R)	$53,129.50	$0.00	$43,596.13
Source: Transparency USA

==== Results ====
2026 New York's 98th State Assembly district election
Party	Candidate	Votes	%	±%
Republican	Karl A. Brabenec			
Conservative	Karl A. Brabenec			
Total	Karl A. Brabenec (incumbent)			
Write-in				
Total votes				

== District 99 ==
2026 New York's 99th State Assembly district election
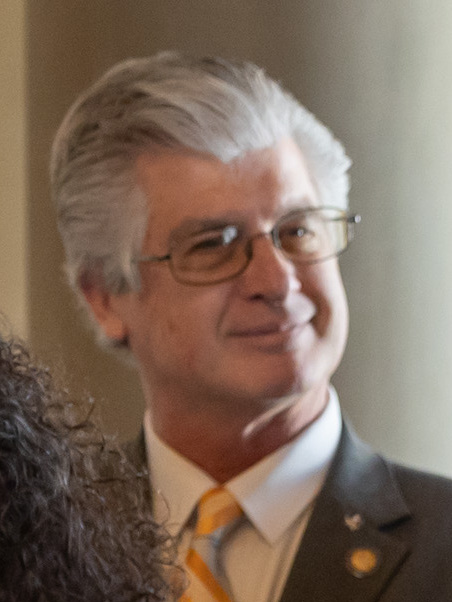

Nominee	Chris Eachus	Richard A. Vargus
Party	Democratic	Republican
Alliance	Working Families	Conservative
Incumbent Assemblymember
Chris Eachus
Democratic

The 99th district is located within Orange and Rockland counties, including the towns of Cornwall, Highlands, New Windsor, Palm Tree, Woodbury, and parts of the town of Monroe in Orange County, and the town of Stony Point in Rockland County. The incumbent is Democrat Chris Eachus, who defeated Republican Tom Lapolla to win a second term with 56.63% of the vote in 2024.

=== Democratic primary ===
==== Nominee ====
- Chris Eachus, incumbent assemblymember

==== Endorsements ====
Chris Eachus

Political parties

- New York Working Families Party

=== Republican primary ===
==== Nominee ====
- Richard A. Vargus

=== Third parties and independents ===
==== Declared ====
- Richard A. Vargus (Conservative)
- Chris Eachus (Working Families), incumbent assemblymember

=== General election ===
==== Predictions ====
Source	Ranking	As of
State Navigate	Solid D	November 2, 2026

==== Fundraising ====
Campaign finance reports as of October 19, 2026
Candidate	Contributions	Loans	Expenditures
Chris Eachus (D)	$167,835.83	$0.00	$56,646.55
Richard A. Vargus (R)	$8,520.02	$0.00	$6,771.85
Source: Transparency USA

==== Results ====
2026 New York's 99th State Assembly district election
Party	Candidate	Votes	%	±%
Democratic	Chris Eachus			
Working Families	Chris Eachus			
Total	Chris Eachus (incumbent)			
Republican	Richard A. Vargus			
Conservative	Richard A. Vargus			
Total	Richard A. Vargus			
Write-in				
Total votes				

== District 100 ==
2026 New York's 100th State Assembly district election
Nominee	Paula Kay
Party	Democratic
Alliance	People Over Politics
Incumbent Assemblymember
Paula Kay
Democratic

The 100th district is located within Orange and Sullivan counties, including the city of Middletown, the town of Wallkill, and parts of the town of Wawayanda in Orange County, and the towns of Bethel, Callicoon, Cochecton, Delaware, Fallsburg, Forestburgh, Highland, Liberty, Lumberland, Mamakating, Thompson, and Tusten in Sullivan County. The incumbent is Democrat Paula Kay, who defeated Republican Louis J. Ingrassia Jr. to succeed retiring ten-full-term Democratic incumbent Aileen Gunther with 52.58% of the vote in 2024.

=== Democratic primary ===
==== Nominee ====
- Paula Kay, incumbent assemblymember

=== Third parties and independents ===
==== Declared ====
- Paula Kay (People Over Politics), incumbent assemblymember

=== General election ===
==== Predictions ====
Source	Ranking	As of
State Navigate	Uncontested D	November 2, 2026

==== Fundraising ====
Campaign finance reports as of October 19, 2026
Candidate	Contributions	Loans	Expenditures
Paula Kay (D)	$1,320.00	$0.00	$3,178.79
Source: Transparency USA

==== Results ====
2026 New York's 100th State Assembly district election
Party	Candidate	Votes	%	±%
Democratic	Paula Kay			
People Over Politics	Paula Kay			
Total	Paula Kay (incumbent)			
Write-in				
Total votes				

== See also ==
- List of New York State legislatures
