= 2020 New York State Assembly election =

2020 New York Assembly election
- November 3, 2020

All 150 seats in the New York State Assembly 75 seats needed for a majority
- Turnout: ▲56.51%
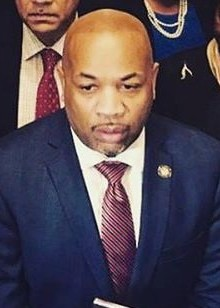

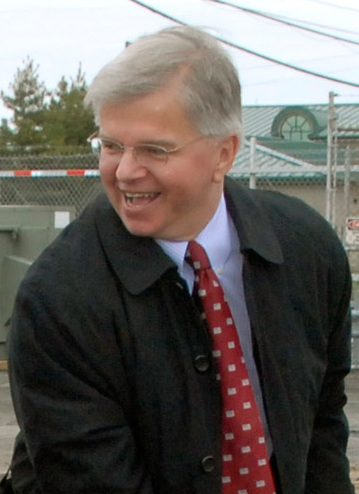
	Majority party	Minority party	Third party
Leader	Carl Heastie	William Barclay	Fred Thiele (Note: Thiele, a member of the Independence Party, caucuses with the Democrats.)
Party	Democratic	Republican	Independence
Leader since	February 3, 2015	January 7, 2020	October 1, 2009
Leader's seat	83rd	120th	1st
Last election	106 seats, 62.0%	43 seats, 28.3%	1 seat, 1.7%
Seats won	105 (Note: This total does not include Rebecca Seawright. Seawright was disqualified from seeking re-election as a Democrat in Assembly District 76 due to paperwork errors. Instead, she campaigned as the candidate of the Rise and Unite Party and was re-elected. It also does not include Fred Thiele of Assembly District One, a member of the Independence Party who caucuses with the Democrats.)	43	1
Seat change	▼1	Steady	Steady
Popular vote	4,482,999	2,430,174	109,184
Percentage	58.52%	31.72%	1.43%
Swing	▼3.49%	▲3.43%	▼0.23%
- Results: Democratic hold Democratic gain Republican hold Republican gain Independence hold Independent gain
Speaker before election
Carl Heastie
Democratic
Speaker
Carl Heastie
Democratic

Elections to the New York State Assembly were held on November 3, 2020 in the U.S. state of New York. The elections were part of the biennial elections in the United States, with elections for the State Senate, the U.S. House, and U.S. president being held on the same day. Primary elections were held on June 23.

Assembly Democrats won 105 of the chamber's 150 seats on election day, while Republicans won 43 seats and two other seats were won by members of third parties.

== Predictions ==
Source	Ranking	As of
The Cook Political Report	Safe D	October 21, 2020

== Summary ==
Longtime Asm. Carmen Arroyo (D-Bronx) was disqualified from the Democratic primary ballot due to election fraud.

Incumbent Asms. Michael DenDekker, Joseph Lentol, Michael Miller, Walter Mosley, Felix Ortiz, and Aravella Simotas were defeated in Democratic primaries.

Incumbents Ellen Jaffee (D-Suffern) and Mark Johns (R-Webster) were defeated in the general election.

Assemblymember Rebecca Seawright was disqualified from seeking re-election as a Democrat due to paperwork errors, but instead campaigned as the candidate of the Rise and Unite Party and was re-elected.

Assemblymember Fred Thiele, a member of the Independence Party who caucuses with the Democrats, was re-elected in Assembly District One.

2020 New York State Assembly Election Results
Party	Votes	%	Swing	Seats	Change
Democratic	4,482,999	58.52%	▼3.49	105	Steady
Republican	2,430,174	31.72%	▲3.43	43	▼1
Conservative	301,261	3.93%	▼0.24	0	Steady
Working Families	254,463	3.32%	▲0.56	0	Steady
Independence	109,184	1.43%	▼0.23	1 (Note: Fred Thiele of Assembly District One is a member of the Independence Party who caucuses with the Democrats.)	Steady
Libertarian	19,879	0.26%	▲0.19	0	Steady
Liberal	5,941	0.08%		0	Steady
Green	5,923	0.08%	▼0.03	0	Steady
Serve America	4,689	0.06%		0	Steady
Others	45,978	0.60%		1 (Note: Rebecca Seawright was disqualified from seeking re-election as a Democrat in Assembly District 76 due to paperwork errors. Instead, she campaigned as the candidate of the Rise and Unite Party and was re-elected.)	▲1
Total votes	7,660,491	100.00%		150	Steady
Registered/turnout	13,555,547	56.51%			

Popular vote
Democratic	58.52%
Republican	31.72%
Conservative	3.93%
Working Families	3.32%
Independence	1.43%
Others	1.08%

State Assembly seats
Democratic	70.67%
Republican	28.67%
Independence	0.67%

== Assembly districts ==
District	Member	Party	First elected	Status	Results
1	Fred Thiele	Dem	1995+	Incumbent re-elected.	Fred Thiele (D) 58% Heather Collins (R) 42%
2	Anthony Palumbo	Rep	2013+	Incumbent retired to run for State Senate. Republican hold.	Jodi Giglio (R) 56% Laura Jens-Smith (D) 42% William Van Helmond (L) 1%
3	Joe DeStefano	Rep	2018	Incumbent re-elected.	Joe DeStefano (R) 56% Steven Polgar (D) 43% Adam Martin (L) 1%
4	Steve Englebright	Dem	1992+	Incumbent re-elected.	Steve Englebright (D) 55% Michael Ross (R) 44% Adam Fischer-Gledhill (L) 1%
5	Douglas M. Smith	Rep	2018+	Incumbent re-elected.	Douglas M. Smith (R) 61% Alfred Ianacci (D) 39%
6	Philip Ramos	Dem	2002	Incumbent re-elected.	Philip Ramos (D) 76% Ryan Skelly (R) 24%
7	Andrew Garbarino	Rep	2012	Incumbent retired to run for Congress. Republican hold.	Jarrett Gandolfo (R) 60% Francis Genco (D) 40%
8	Michael J. Fitzpatrick	Rep	2002	Incumbent re-elected.	Michael Fitzpatrick (R) 64% Dylan Rice (D) 36%
9	Mike LiPietri	Rep	2018	Incumbent retired to run for Congress. Republican hold.	Michael Durso (R) 62% Ann Brancato (D) 38%
10	Steve Stern	Dem	2018+	Incumbent re-elected.	Steve Stern (D) 56% Jamie Silvestri (R) 44%
11	Kimberly Jean-Pierre	Dem	2014	Incumbent re-elected.	Kimberly Jean-Pierre (D) 60% Eugene Murray (R) 40%
12	Keith Brown	Rep	2020+	Incumbent re-elected.	Keith Brown (R) 52% Michael Marcantonio (D) 48%
13	Charles D. Lavine	Dem	2004	Incumbent re-elected.	Charles Lavine (D) 63% Andrew Monteleone (R) 37%
14	David McDonough	Rep	2002+	Incumbent re-elected.	David McDonough (R) 59% Kevin Gorman (D) 40% Jake Gutowitz (L) 1%
15	Michael Montesano	Rep	2010+	Incumbent re-elected.	Michael Montesano (R) 56% Joseph Sackman (D) 44%
16	Anthony D'Urso	Dem	2016	Incumbent retired. Democratic hold.	Gina Sillitti (D) 53.7% Ragini Srivastava (R) 45.8% Blay Tarnoff (L) 0.5%
17	John Mikulin	Rep	2018+	Incumbent re-elected.	John Mikulin (R) 60% Mark Engelman (D) 40%
18	Taylor Darling	Dem	2018	Incumbent re-elected.	Taylor Darling (D) 85% Cherice Vanderhall (R) 15%
19	Ed Ra	Rep	2010	Incumbent re-elected.	Ed Ra (R) 59% Gary Port (D) 41%
20	Melissa Miller	Rep	2016	Incumbent re-elected.	Melissa Miller (R) 59% Gregory Marks (D) 41%
21	Judy Griffin	Dem	2018	Incumbent re-elected.	Judy Griffin (D) 53% Patricia Canzoneri-Fitzpatrick (R) 46% Barry Leon (L) 1%
22	Michaelle C. Solages	Dem	2012	Incumbent re-elected.	Michaelle Solages (D) 68% Nicholas Zacchea (R) 32%
23	Stacey Pheffer Amato	Dem	2016	Incumbent re-elected.	Stacey Pheffer Amato (D) 62% Peter Hatzipetros (R) 38%
24	David Weprin	Dem	2010+	Incumbent re-elected.	David Weprin (D) 100%
25	Nily Rozic	Dem	2012	Incumbent re-elected.	Nily Rozic (D) 100%
26	Edward Braunstein	Dem	2010	Incumbent re-elected.	Edward Braunstein (D) 55% John-Alexander Sakelos (R) 45%
27	Daniel Rosenthal	Dem	2017+	Incumbent re-elected.	Daniel Rosenthal (D) 100%
28	Andrew Hevesi	Dem	2005+	Incumbent re-elected.	Andrew Hevesi (D) 87% Danniel Malo (COVID19 Stories) 13%
29	Alicia Hyndman	Dem	2015+	Incumbent re-elected.	Alicia Hyndman (D) 100%
30	Brian Barnwell	Dem	2016	Incumbent re-elected.	Brian Barnwell (D) 100%
31	Vacant	Dem		Incumbent resigned January 1, 2020, after being elected New York City Civil Court Judge. Democratic hold.	Khaleel Anderson (D) 89% Joseph Cullina (R) 11%
32	Vivian E. Cook	Dem	1990	Incumbent re-elected.	Vivian E. Cook (D) 100%
33	Clyde Vanel	Dem	2016+	Incumbent re-elected.	Clyde Vanel (D) 100%
34	Michael DenDekker	Dem	2008	Incumbent defeated for renomination. Democratic hold.	Jessica Gonzalez-Rojas (D) 78% William Marquez (R) 22%
35	Jeffrion L. Aubry	Dem	1992+	Incumbent re-elected.	Jeffrion Aubry (D) 78% Han-Kohn To (R) 22%
36	Aravella Simotas	Dem	2010	Incumbent defeated for renomination. Democratic hold.	Zohran Mamdani (D) 100%
37	Catherine Nolan	Dem	1984	Incumbent re-elected.	Catherine Nolan (D) 100%
38	Michael G. Miller	Dem	2009+	Incumbent defeated for renomination. Democratic hold.	Jenifer Rajkumar (D) 73% Giovanni Perna (R) 27%
39	Catalina Cruz	Dem	2018	Incumbent re-elected.	Catalina Cruz (D) 100%
40	Ron Kim	Dem	2012	Incumbent re-elected.	Ron Kim (D) 84% Steven Lee (Justice & Peace) 16%
41	Helene Weinstein	Dem	1980	Incumbent re-elected.	Helene Weinstein (D) 65% Ramona Johnson (R) 35%
42	Rodneyse Bichotte	Dem	2014	Incumbent re-elected.	Rodneyse Bichotte (D) 100%
43	Diana Richardson	Dem	2015+	Incumbent re-elected.	Diana Richardson (D) 89% Menachem Raitport (R) 11%
44	Robert Carroll	Dem	2016	Incumbent re-elected.	Robert Carroll (D) 79% Salvatore Barrera (R) 21%
45	Steven Cymbrowitz	Dem	2000	Incumbent re-elected.	Steven Cymbrowitz (D) 100%
46	Mathylde Frontus	Dem	2018	Incumbent re-elected.	Mathylde Frontus (D) 51% Mark Szuszkiewicz (R) 49%
47	William Colton	Dem	1996	Incumbent re-elected.	William Colton (D) 62% Barbara Marino (R) 38%
48	Simcha Eichenstein	Dem	2018	Incumbent re-elected.	Simcha Eichenstein (D) 100%
49	Peter J. Abbate Jr.	Dem	1986	Incumbent re-elected.	Peter J. Abbate Jr. (D) 100%
50	Joe Lentol	Dem	1972	Incumbent defeated for renomination. Democratic hold.	Emily Gallagher (D) 100%
51	Felix Ortiz	Dem	1994	Incumbent defeated for renomination. Democratic hold.	Marcela Mitaynes (D) 100%
52	Jo Anne Simon	Dem	2014	Incumbent re-elected.	Jo Anne Simon (D) 100%
53	Maritza Davila	Dem	2013+	Incumbent re-elected.	Maritza Davila (D) 100%
54	Erik Martin Dilan	Dem	2014	Incumbent re-elected.	Erik Martin Dilan (D) 86% Khorshed Chowdhury (R) 9% Scott Hutchins (G) 5%
55	Latrice Walker	Dem	2014	Incumbent re-elected.	Latrice Walker (D) Berneda Jackson (R)
56	Tremaine Wright	Dem	2016	Incumbent retired to run for State Senate. Democratic hold.	Stefani Zinerman (D)
57	Walter Mosley	Dem	2012	Incumbent defeated for renomination. Democratic hold.	Phara Souffrant Forrest (D) 76% Walter Mosley (WF) 24%
58	N. Nick Perry	Dem	1992	Incumbent re-elected.	N. Nick Perry (D) 100%
59	Jaime Williams	Dem	2016+	Incumbent re-elected.	Jaime Williams (D) 100%
60	Charles Barron	Dem	2014	Incumbent re-elected.	Charles Barron (D) 100%
61	Charles Fall	Dem	2018	Incumbent re-elected.	Charles Fall (D) 69% Paul Ciurcina (R) 31%
62	Michael Reilly	Rep	2018	Incumbent re-elected.	Michael Reilly (R) 100%
63	Michael Cusick	Dem	2002	Incumbent re-elected.	Michael Cusick (D) 53% Anthony DeGuerre (R) 47%
64	Nicole Malliotakis	Rep	2010	Incumbent retired to run for Congress. Republican hold.	Michael Tannousis (R) 59% Brandon Patterson (D) 41%
65	Yuh-Line Niou	Dem	2016	Incumbent re-elected.	Yuh-Line Niou (D) 100%
66	Deborah J. Glick	Dem	1990	Incumbent re-elected.	Deborah Glick (D) 85% Tamara Lashchyk (R) 15%
67	Linda Rosenthal	Dem	2006+	Incumbent re-elected.	Linda Rosenthal (D) 100%
68	Robert J. Rodriguez	Dem	2010	Incumbent re-elected.	Robert J. Rodriguez (D) 90% Daby Benjamine Carreras (R) 10%
69	Daniel J. O'Donnell	Dem	2002	Incumbent re-elected.	Daniel J. O'Donnell (D) 100%
70	Inez Dickens	Dem	2016	Incumbent re-elected.	Inez Dickens (D) 90% Craig Schley (Schley for 70) 10%
71	Al Taylor	Dem	2017+	Incumbent re-elected.	Al Taylor (D) 100%
72	Carmen De La Rosa	Dem	2016	Incumbent re-elected.	Carmen De La Rosa (D) 100%
73	Dan Quart	Dem	2011+	Incumbent re-elected.	Dan Quart (D) 74% Judith Graham (R) 26%
74	Harvey Epstein	Dem	2018+	Incumbent re-elected.	Harvey Epstein (D) 100%
75	Richard N. Gottfried	Dem	1970	Incumbent re-elected.	Richard N. Gottfried (D) 100%
76	Rebecca Seawright	Dem	2014	Incumbent re-elected.	Rebecca Seawright (Rise and Unite) 58% Louis Puliafito (R) 42%
77	Latoya Joyner	Dem	2014	Incumbent re-elected.	Latoya Joyner (D) 89% Tanya Carmichael (R) 10% Benjamin Eggleston (C) 1%
78	Jose Rivera	Dem	2000	Incumbent re-elected.	Jose Rivera (D) 88% Michael Dister (R) 12%
79	Michael Blake	Dem	2014	Incumbent retired to run for Congress. Democratic hold.	Chantel Jackson (D) 90% Donald Skinner (R) 8% Dion Powell (C) 2%
80	Nathalia Fernandez	Dem	2018+	Incumbent re-elected.	Nathalia Fernandez (D) 79% Gene DeFrancis (R) 18% Elizabeth Perri (C) 3%
81	Jeffrey Dinowitz	Dem	1994+	Incumbent re-elected.	Jeffrey Dinowitz (D) 81% Nicole Torres (R) 16% Alan Reed (C) 3%
82	Michael Benedetto	Dem	2004	Incumbent re-elected.	Michael Benedetto (D) 74% John DeStefano (R) 23% William Britt (C) 3%
83	Carl Heastie	Dem	2000	Incumbent re-elected.	Carl Heastie (D) 93% Brenton Ritchie (R) 4% Regina Cartagena (C) 3%
84	Carmen Arroyo	Dem	1994+	Incumbent removed from primary ballot due to petitioning fraud. Democratic hold.	Amanda Septimo (D) 84% Rosaline Nieves (R) 10% Carmen Arroyo (Proven Leader) 4% Linda Ortiz (C) 2%
85	Vacant	Dem		Incumbent resigned in February 2020. Democratic hold.	Kenny Burgos (D) 88% Janelle King (R) 10% Gabriel Eronosele (C) 2%
86	Victor Pichardo	Dem	2013+	Incumbent re-elected.	Victor Pichardo (D) 88% Lorraine Zeigler (R) 12%
87	Karines Reyes	Dem	2018	Incumbent re-elected.	Karines Reyes (D) 87.7% Michelle Castillo (R) 10.1% Juan DeJesus (C) 1.7% Carl Lundgren (G) 0.6%
88	Amy Paulin	Dem	2000	Incumbent re-elected.	Amy Paulin (D) 100%
89	J. Gary Pretlow	Dem	1992	Incumbent re-elected.	J. Gary Pretlow (D) 100%
90	Nader Sayegh	Dem	2018	Incumbent re-elected.	Nader Sayegh (D) 100%
91	Steven Otis	Dem	2012	Incumbent re-elected.	Steven Otis (D) 100%
92	Thomas J. Abinanti	Dem	2010	Incumbent re-elected.	Thomas J. Abinanti (D) 100%
93	David Buchwald	Dem	2012	Incumbent retired to run for Congress. Democratic hold.	Chris Burdick (D) 66% John Nuculovic (R) 34%
94	Kevin Byrne	Rep	2016	Incumbent re-elected.	Kevin Byrne (R) 58% Stephanie Keegan (D) 42%
95	Sandy Galef	Dem	1992	Incumbent re-elected.	Sandy Galef (D) 66% Lawrence Chiulli (R) 34%
96	Kenneth Zebrowski Jr.	Dem	2007+	Incumbent re-elected.	Kenneth Zebrowski Jr. (D) 100%
97	Ellen Jaffee	Dem	2006	Incumbent lost re-election. Republican gain.	Mike Lawler (R) 52% Ellen Jaffee (D) 48%
98	Karl A. Brabenec	Rep	2014	Incumbent re-elected.	Karl A. Brabenec (R) 100%
99	Colin Schmitt	Rep	2018	Incumbent re-elected.	Colin Schmitt (R) 57% Sarita Bhandarkar (D) 43%
100	Aileen Gunther	Dem	2003+	Incumbent re-elected.	Aileen Gunther (D) 100%
101	Brian Miller	Rep	2016	Incumbent re-elected.	Brian Miller (R) 60% Chad McEvoy (D) 38% Barbara Kidney (G) 2%
102	Christopher Tague	Rep	2018+	Incumbent re-elected.	Christopher Tague (R) 64% Betsy Kraat (D) 36%
103	Kevin A. Cahill	Dem	1998	Incumbent re-elected.	Kevin Cahill (D) 70% Rex Bridges (R) 30%
104	Jonathan Jacobson	Dem	2018+	Incumbent re-elected.	Jonathan Jacobson (D) 64% Andrew Gauzza (R) 36%
105	Kieran Lalor	Rep	2012	Incumbent re-elected.	Kieran Lalor (R) 57% Laurette Giardino (D) 43%
106	Didi Barrett	Dem	2012+	Incumbent re-elected.	Didi Barrett (D) 58% Dean Michael (R) 42%
107	Jake Ashby	Rep	2018+	Incumbent re-elected.	Jake Ashby (R) 45% Brittany Vogel (D) 54% Charles Senrick (L) 1%
108	John T. McDonald III	Dem	2012	Incumbent re-elected.	John McDonald (D) 66% Petros Papanicolaou (R) 26% Sam Fein (WF) 9%
109	Patricia Fahy	Dem	2012	Incumbent re-elected.	Patricia Fahy (D) 70% Robert Porter (R) 30%
110	Phillip Steck	Dem	2012	Incumbent re-elected.	Phillip Steck (D) 63% Dave Feiden (R) 37%
111	Angelo Santabarbara	Dem	2012	Incumbent re-elected.	Angelo Santabarbara (D) 60% Paul DeLorenzo (R) 40%
112	Mary Beth Walsh	Rep	2016	Incumbent re-elected.	Mary Beth Walsh (R) 58% Joseph Seeman (D) 42%
113	Carrie Woerner	Dem	2014	Incumbent re-elected.	Carrie Woerner (D) 55% David Catalfamo (R) 45%
114	Dan Stec	Rep	2012	Incumbent retired to run for State Senate. Republican hold.	Matt Simpson (R) 57% Claudia Braymer (D) 42% Evelyn Wood (SAM) 1%
115	Billy Jones	Dem	2016	Incumbent re-elected.	Billy Jones (D) 100%
116	Mark Walczyk	Rep	2018	Incumbent re-elected.	Mark Walczyk (R) 63% Alex Hammond (D) 37%
117	Ken Blankenbush	Rep	2010	Incumbent re-elected	Ken Blankenbush (R) 100%
118	Robert Smullen	Rep	2018	Incumbent re-elected	Robert Smullen (R) 100%
119	Marianne Buttenschon	Dem	2018	Incumbent re-elected	Marianne Buttenschon (D) 57% John Zielinski (R) 42% Michael Gentile (SAM) 1%
120	William A. Barclay	Rep	2002	Incumbent re-elected	William Barclay (R) 70% Gail Tosh (D) 30%
121	John Salka	Rep	2018	Incumbent re-elected	John Salka (R) 59% Dan Butterman (D) 37% Corey Mosher (WF) 3% Jake Cornell (L) 1%
122	Clifford Crouch	Rep	2020	Incumbent retired. Republican hold.	Joe Angelino (R) 69% Richard Shaw (D) 31%
123	Donna Lupardo	Dem	2004	Incumbent re-elected	Donna Lupardo (D) 100%
124	Christopher S. Friend	Rep	2010	Incumbent re-elected	Christopher Friend (R) 64% Randy Reid (D) 36%
125	Barbara Lifton	Dem	2002	Incumbent retired. Democratic hold.	Anna Kelles (D) 69% Matthew McIntyre (R) 31%
126	Gary Finch	Rep	1999+	Incumbent retired. Republican hold.	John Lemondes Jr. (R) 57% Dia Carbajal (D) 43%
127	Albert A. Stirpe Jr.	Dem	2012	Incumbent re-elected	Al Stirpe (D) 55% Mark Venesky (R) 45%
128	Pamela Hunter	Dem	2015+	Incumbent re-elected	Pamela Hunter (D) 65% Stephanie Jackson (R) 35%
129	William Magnarelli	Dem	1998	Incumbent re-elected	Bill Magnarelli (D) 72% Edward Weber (R) 28%
130	Brian Manktelow	Rep	2018	Incumbent re-elected	Brian Manktelow (R) 69% Scott Comegys (D) 31%
131	Brian Kolb	Rep	2000+	Incumbent retired. Republican hold.	Jeff Gallahan (R) 56% Matthew Miller (D) 42% Cynthia Wade (SAM) 2%
132	Phil Palmesano	Rep	2010	Incumbent re-elected	Phil Palmesano (R) 100%
133	Marjorie Byrnes	Rep	2018	Incumbent re-elected	Marjorie Byrnes (R) 62% ChaRon Sattler-Leblanc (D) 38%
134	Peter Lawrence	Rep	2014	Incumbent retired. Republican hold.	Josh Jensen (R) 58% Carolyn Carroll (D) 38% Dylan Dailor (WF) 2% Ericka Jones (G) 2%
135	Mark Johns	Rep	2010	Incumbent lost reelection. Democratic gain.	Jennifer Lunsford (D) 50.4% Mark Johns (R) 49.6%
136	Vacant	Dem		Incumbent resigned February 6, 2020 after being appointed Monroe County Clerk. Democratic hold.	Sarah Clark (D) 87% Steven Becker (L) 6% Justin Wilcox (Ind) 8%
137	Vacant	Dem		Incumbent retired, and died July 1, 2020. Democratic hold	Demond Meeks (D) 100%
138	Harry Bronson	Dem	2010	Incumbent re-elected	Harry Bronson (D) 65% Peter Vazquez (R) 35%
139	Stephen Hawley	Rep	2006+	Incumbent re-elected	Stephen Hawley (R) 91% Mark Glogowski (L) 9%
140	Robin Schimminger	Dem	1976	Incumbent retired. Democratic hold.	William Conrad (D) 58% Robert Pecoraro (R) 40% Anthony Baney (G) 2%
141	Crystal Peoples-Stokes	Dem	2002	Incumbent re-elected	Crystal Peoples-Stokes (D) 90% Sean Miles (R) 10%
142	Patrick B. Burke	Dem	2018	Incumbent re-elected	Patrick Burke (D) 56% Matthew Szalkowski (R) 44%
143	Monica P. Wallace	Dem	2016	Incumbent re-elected	Monica Wallace (D) 52% Frank Smierciak (R) 48%
144	Michael Norris	Rep	2016	Incumbent re-elected	Michael Norris (R) 100%
145	Angelo Morinello	Rep	2016	Incumbent re-elected	Angelo Morinello (R) 100%
146	Karen McMahon	Dem	2018	Incumbent re-elected	Karen McMahon (D) 55% Robin Wolfgang (R) 44% Ruben Cartagena (G) 1%
147	David DiPietro	Rep	2012	Incumbent re-elected	David DiPietro (R) 100%
148	Joseph Giglio	Rep	2005+	Incumbent re-elected	Joseph Giglio (R) 74% W. Ross Scott (D) 25%
149	Sean Ryan	Dem	2011+	Incumbent retired to run for state senate. Democratic hold.	Jonathan Rivera (D) 66% Joseph Totaro (R) 34%
150	Andy Goodell	Rep	2010	Incumbent re-elected	Andy Goodell (R) 69% Christina Cardinale (D) 31%

- +Elected in a special election.

== District 1 ==
2020 New York's 1st Assembly District election
- November 3, 2020
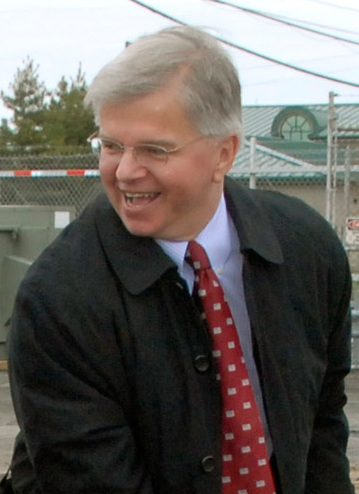
Nominee	Fred Thiele	Heather Collins
Party	Independence	Republican
Alliance	Democratic	Conservative
Popular vote	40,689	29,133
Percentage	58.26%	41.71%
Assemblymember before election
Fred Thiele
Independence
Elected Assemblymember
Fred Thiele
Independence

The incumbent was Fred Thiele, who ran for re-election.

=== General election ===
==== Results ====
New York's 1st Assembly district election, 2020
Party	Candidate	Votes	%
Democratic	Fred Thiele	39,195	56.12%
Independence	Fred Thiele	1,494	2.14%
Total	Fred Thiele (incumbent)	40,689	58.26%
Republican	Heather Collins	25,850	37.02%
Conservative	Heather Collins	3,283	4.70%
Total	Heather Collins	29,133	41.71%
Write-in		19	0.03%
Total votes		69,841	100%

== District 2 ==
2020 New York's 2nd Assembly District election
- November 3, 2020
Nominee	Jodi Giglio	Laura Jens-Smith
Party	Republican	Democratic
Alliance	Conservative; Independence	Working Families
Popular vote	39,903	30,141
Percentage	56.22%	42.47%
Assemblymember before election
Anthony Palumbo
Republican
Elected Assemblymember
Jodi Giglio
Republican

The incumbent was Anthony Palumbo, who retired to successfully run for state senate. Republican Jodi Giglio, a former member of the Riverhead, New York town board, was elected.

=== Democratic primary ===
==== Candidates ====
- Laura Jens-Smith, Riverhead town supervisor
- William Schleisner

==== Results ====
Democratic primary results
Party	Candidate	Votes	%
Democratic	Laura Jens-Smith	6,743	75.97
Democratic	William Schleisner	2,124	23.93
Write-in		9	0.10%
Total votes		8,876	100.0

=== General election ===
==== Results ====
New York's 2nd Assembly district election, 2020
Party	Candidate	Votes	%
Republican	Jodi Giglio	34,874	49.13%
Conservative	Jodi Giglio	4,378	6.17%
Independence	Jodi Giglio	651	0.92%
Total	Jodi Giglio	39,903	56.22%
Democratic	Laura Jens-Smith	28,501	40.16%
Working Families	Laura Jens-Smith	3,283	2.31%
Total	Laura Jens-Smith	30,141	42.47%
Libertarian	William Van Helmond	926	1.31%
Write-in		6	0.01%
Total votes		70,976	100%

== District 61 ==
2020 New York's 61st Assembly District election
- November 3, 2020
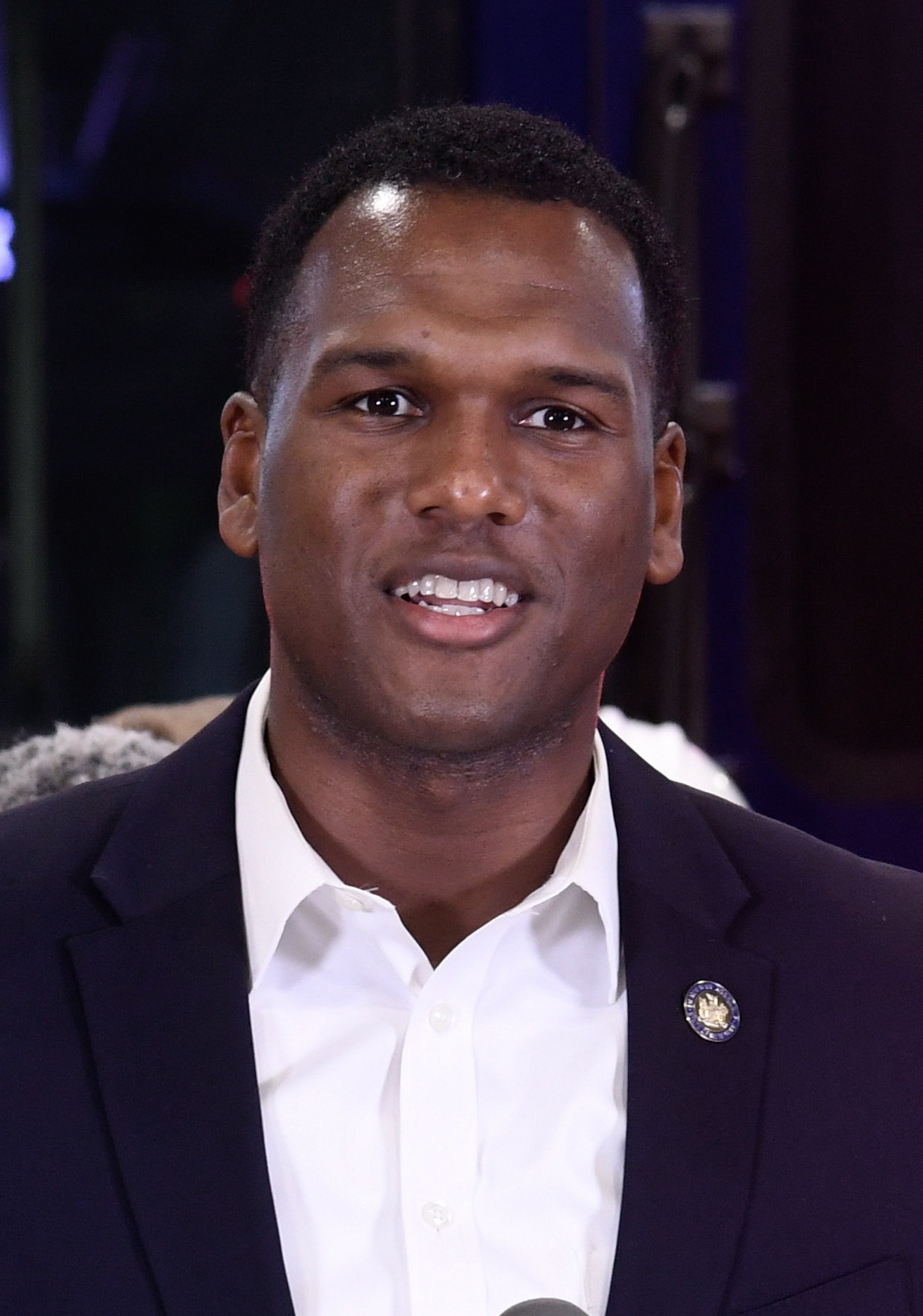
Nominee	Charles Fall	Paul Ciurcina, Jr.
Party	Democratic	Republican
Alliance	Independence	Conservative
Popular vote	32,905	14,870
Percentage	68.80%	31.09%
- Results by precinct Fall: 50–60% 60–70% 70–80% 80–90% 90–100% Ciurcina, Jr.ː 50–60% 60–70% 70–80% No resultsː
Assemblymember before election
Charles Fall
Democratic
Elected Assemblymember
Charles Fall
Democratic

The incumbent was Charles Fall, who ran for re-election.

=== General election ===
==== Results ====
New York's 61st Assembly district election, 2020
Party	Candidate	Votes	%
Democratic	Charles Fall	32,185	67.30%
Independence	Charles Fall	720	1.50%
Total	Charles Fall (incumbent)	32,905	68.80%
Republican	Paul Ciurcina, Jr.	13,015	27.21%
Conservative	Paul Ciurcina, Jr.	1,855	3.88%
Total	Paul Ciurcina, Jr.	14,870	31.09%
Write-in		50	0.11%
Total votes		47,825	100%

== District 63 ==
2020 New York's 63rd Assembly District election
- November 3, 2020
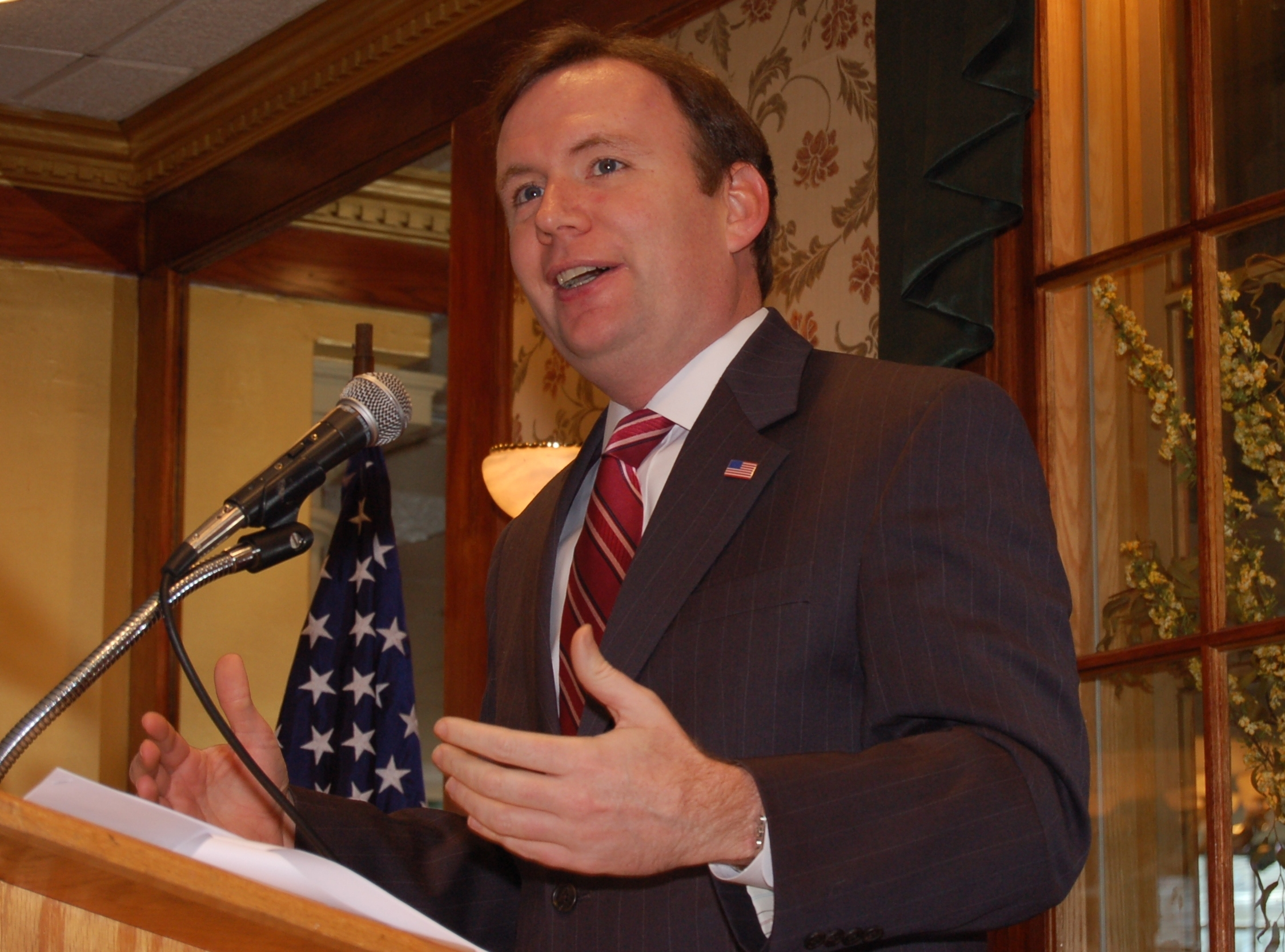
Nominee	Michael Cusick	Anthony DeGuerre
Party	Democratic	Republican
Alliance	Independence	Conservative; SAM
Popular vote	28,776	25,740
Percentage	52.73%	47.17%
- Results by precinct Cusick: 50–60% 60–70% 70–80% 80–90% 90–100% DeGuerreː 50–60% 60–70% 70–80% No resultsː
Assemblymember before election
Michael Cusick
Democratic
Elected Assemblymember
Michael Cusick
Democratic

The incumbent was Michael Cusick, who ran for re-election.

=== General election ===
==== Results ====
New York's 63rd Assembly district election, 2020
Party	Candidate	Votes	%
Democratic	Michael Cusick	32,185	51.37%
Independence	Michael Cusick	741	1.36%
Total	Michael Cusick (incumbent)	28,776	52.73%
Republican	Anthony DeGuerre	23,636	43.31%
Conservative	Anthony DeGuerre	1,984	3.64%
SAM	Anthony DeGuerre	120	0.22%
Total	Anthony DeGuerre	25,740	47.17%
Write-in		58	0.11%
Total votes		54,574	100%

== District 64 ==
2020 New York's 64th Assembly District election
- November 3, 2020
Nominee	Michael Tannousis	Brandon Peterson
Party	Republican	Democratic
Alliance	Conservative	Independence
Popular vote	28,776	25,740
Percentage	52.73%	47.17%
- Results by precinct Peterson: 50–60% 60–70% 70–80% Tannousis: 50–60% 60–70% 70–80% No resultsː
Assemblymember before election
Nicole Malliotakis
Republican
Elected Assemblymember
Michael Tannousis
Republican

The incumbent was Nicole Malliotakis, who retired to successfully run for congress.

=== General election ===
==== Results ====
New York's 64th Assembly district election, 2020
Party	Candidate	Votes	%
Republican	Michael Tannousis	27,888	53.24%
Conservative	Michael Tannousis	274	1.36%
Total	Michael Tannousis	30,630	58.47%
Democratic	Brandon Peterson	21,076	40.23%
Independence	Brandon Peterson	621	1.19%
Total	Brandon Peterson	21,697	41.42%
Write-in		57	0.11%
Total votes		52,384	100%

== See also ==
- 2020 New York state elections
