= Lester Chang =

American politician

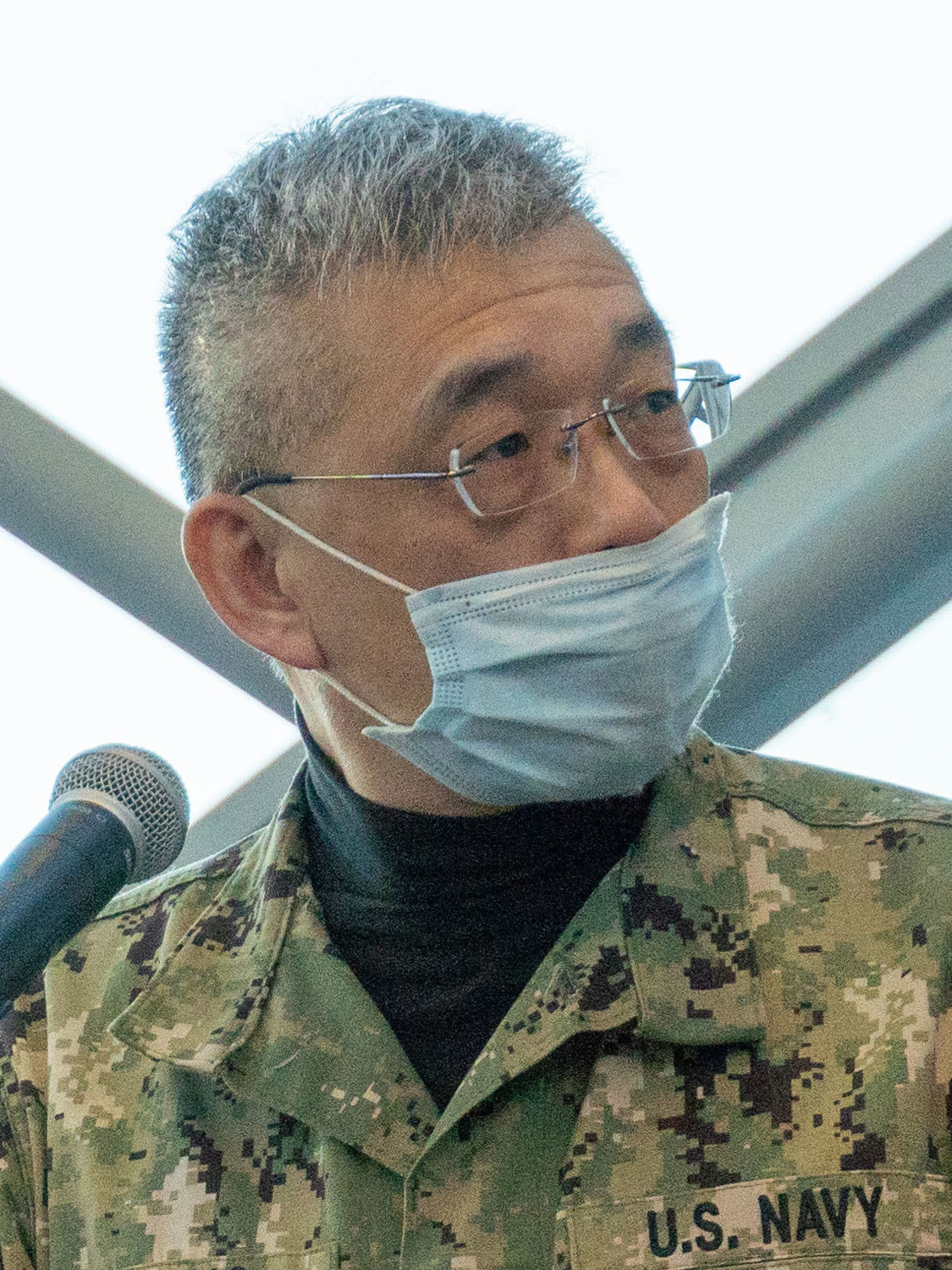
- Chang in 2021 discussing COVID-19 vaccinations at the Javits Convention Center

Member of the New York State Assembly from the 49th district
- Incumbent
- Assumed office January 3, 2023
- Preceded by: Peter J. Abbate Jr.

Personal details
- Born: New York City, New York, U.S.
- Party: Republican
- Education: Brooklyn College (BS); State University of New York Maritime College (MS)

Military service
- Allegiance: United States
- Branch/service: United States Navy
- Rank: Chief Warrant Officer
- Unit: United States Navy Reserve
- Battles/wars: War in Afghanistan

Lester Chang (Chinese: 鄭永佳) is an American politician who represents the 49th district of the New York State Assembly, which comprises part of South Brooklyn. A Republican, he defeated longtime Democratic incumbent Peter J. Abbate Jr. in 2022.

== Early life and education ==
Lester Chang was born on the Lower East Side of Manhattan to parents from China. When he was 8 years old, his father died of cancer and the family moved to Hong Kong before moving to Midwood, Brooklyn. Chang graduated from Midwood High School, then Brooklyn College with a Bachelor of Science in accounting and the State University of New York Maritime College with a Master of Science in international transportation.

=== Naval Reserve ===
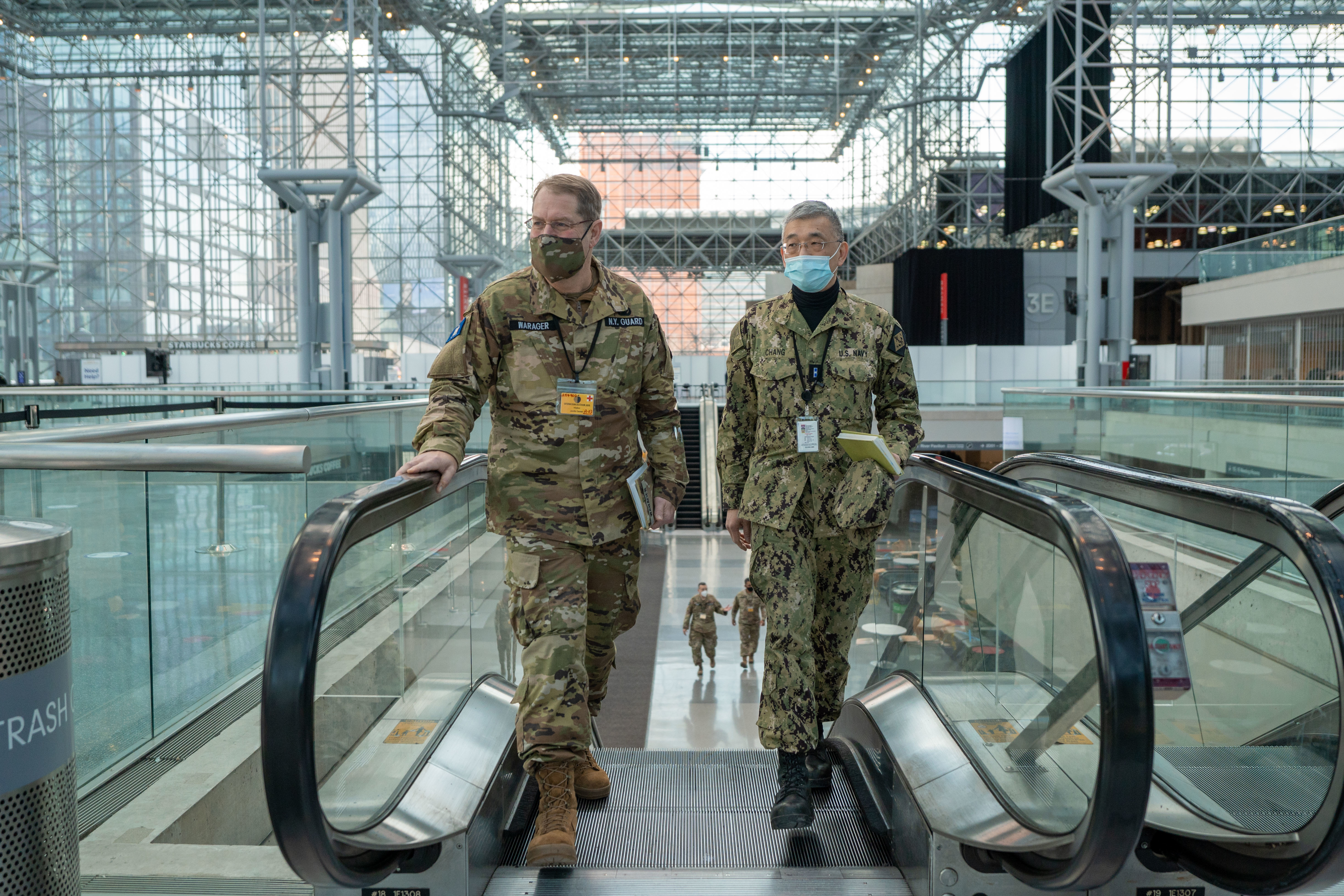
Chang guides Brig. Gen. Warager through the NY Guard's COVID-19 response at Javits Center.

Chang is a retired member of the United States Navy Reserve and current member of the New York Naval Militia. In the aftermath of 9/11, he was assigned to Washington, D.C. and was deployed to Bagram, Afghanistan as a military analyst.

== Political career ==
Chang first ran for office in the 2016 special election for the 65th Assembly district to succeed Sheldon Silver following his resignation due to a corruption scandal. He was on the ballot for the Republican, Reform, Independence, and 'Clean Up This Mess' party lines. He placed third behind Democrat Alice Cancel and Working Families Party-endorsed Yuh-Line Niou respectively.

In 2020, he ran for State Senate in the 26th district, losing to incumbent Democrat Brian Kavanagh.

In 2022, Chang announced he would run against longtime Democratic incumbent Peter J. Abbate Jr. in the 49th Assembly district. The redrawn district is majority Asian-American and includes parts of the Southern Brooklyn communities of Dyker Heights, Sunset Park, Borough Park and Bensonhurst. In an upset attributed to Republican organizing in the traditionally Democratic-leaning Chinese community and the support of several hometown associations, Chang defeated Abbate. He was sworn in as a member of the Assembly on January 3, 2023.

Chang was re-elected to the Assembly in 2024, but lost in the subsequent election in 2026 to Joyce Xiaoqiong Xie, the former budget director for New York City Council Member Susan Zhuang.

=== Residency questions ===
Following his election to the State Assembly, the Brooklyn Democratic Party attempted to block Chang from being seated. Proponents claimed that Chang had been living in Manhattan and was therefore ineligible to have been elected under New York's one-year residency requirement for candidates. Chang claimed to have lived in Manhattan until 2019, when his late wife died, before moving back to Brooklyn; however, records showed he had voted in Manhattan in 2021 and previously ran for office there in 2016 and 2020. Critics of the move pointed out that his ballot petitions could have been challenged in court before the election, but Democrats waited to make an issue of Chang's residency until after he had already won.

Following an investigation organized by Speaker Carl Heastie, Assembly Democrats announced in January 2023 that despite concerns as to the truthfulness of Chang's claims about his district residency, they would not attempt to expel Chang from the Assembly based on those concerns. Assembly Speaker Carl Heastie emphasized that Assembly Democrats were at liberty to revisit the issue at a later time.

The Daily News editorial board published an article in support of Chang taking his Assembly seat, noting hypocrisy from Brooklyn Democratic Party Chair Rodneyse Bichotte Hermelyn and Heastie.

== Personal life ==
Chang lives in his childhood home in Bensonhurst, Brooklyn. He has spoken about receiving mental health treatment for PTSD, the death of his wife from cancer in 2019, and aiding his 95-year-old mother who suffers from Alzheimer's disease.

== Electoral history ==
=== 2024 ===
2024 New York State Assembly election, District 49
Party	Candidate	Votes	%
Republican	Lester Chang	12,951	
Conservative	Lester Chang	2,142	
Total	Lester Chang (incumbent)	15,093	97.3
Write-in		425	2.7
Total votes		15,518	100.0
Republican hold			

=== 2022 ===
2022 New York State Assembly election, District 49
Party	Candidate	Votes	%
Republican	Lester Chang	6,888	
Conservative	Lester Chang	536	
Total	Lester Chang	7,424	52.0
Democratic	Peter Abbate Jr. (incumbent)	6,842	47.9
Write-in		21	0.1
Total votes		14,287	100.0
Republican gain from Democratic			

=== 2020 ===
2020 New York State Senate election, District 26
Party	Candidate	Votes	%
Democratic	Brian Kavanagh (incumbent)	95,552	78.9
Republican	Lester Chang	22,549	
Conservative	Lester Chang	2,752	
Total	Lester Chang	25,301	20.9
Write-in		222	0.2
Total votes		121,075	100.0
Democratic hold			

=== 2016 ===
2016 New York State Assembly special election, District 65
Party	Candidate	Votes	%
Democratic	Alice Cancel	7,873	41.3
Working Families	Yuh-Line Niou	6,654	34.9
Republican	Lester Chang	2,972	
Independence	Lester Chang	503	
Clean Up The Mess	Lester Chang	155	
Reform	Lester Chang	122	
Total	Lester Chang	3,752	19.7
Green	Dennis Levy	714	3.7
Write-in		53	0.4
Total votes		19,046	100.0
Democratic hold			
