= New York's 126th State Assembly district =

American legislative district

Assemblymember
John Lemondes Jr. R–Lafayette

New York's 126th State Assembly district is one of the 150 districts in the New York State Assembly. It has been represented by Republican John Lemondes Jr. since 2021, succeeding Gary Finch.

== Geography ==
District 126 contains portions of Cayuga and Onondaga counties.

== Recent election results ==
=== 2026 ===
2026 New York State Assembly election, District 126
Party	Candidate	Votes	%
Republican	John Lemondes Jr.		
Conservative	John Lemondes Jr.		
Total	John Lemondes Jr. (incumbent)		
Democratic	Ian Phillips		
Working Families	Ian Phillips		
Total	Ian Phillips		
Write-in			
Total votes			

=== 2024 ===
2024 New York State Assembly election, District 126
Party	Candidate	Votes	%
Republican	John Lemondes Jr.	35,169	
Conservative	John Lemondes Jr.	4,995	
Total	John Lemondes Jr. (incumbent)	40,164	55.0
Democratic	Ian Phillips	30,301	
Working Families	Ian Phillips	2,541	
Total	Ian Phillips	32,842	45.0
Write-in		31	0.0
Total votes		73,037	100.0
Republican hold			

=== 2022 ===
2022 New York State Assembly election, District 126
Party	Candidate	Votes	%
Republican	John Lemondes Jr.	27,813	
Conservative	John Lemondes Jr.	4,901	
Total	John Lemondes Jr. (incumbent)	32,714	58.0
Democratic	Bruce McBain	23,674	42.0
Write-in		23	0.0
Total votes		56,411	100.0
Republican hold			

=== 2020 ===
2020 New York State Assembly election, District 126
Primary election
Party	Candidate	Votes	%
Republican	John Lemondes Jr.	3,494	56.9
Republican	Daniel Fitzpatrick	2,622	42.7
Write-in		27	0.4
Total votes		6,143	100
General election
Republican	John Lemondes Jr.	33,136	
Conservative	John Lemondes Jr.	4,192	
Independence	John Lemondes Jr.	1,164	
Total	John Lemondes Jr.	38,492	57.2
Democratic	Dia Carabajal	26,779	
Working Families	Dia Carabajal	1,998	
Total	Dia Carabajal	28,777	42.8
Write-in		14	0.0
Total votes		67,297	100.0
Republican hold			

=== 2018 ===
2018 New York State Assembly election, District 126
Party	Candidate	Votes	%
Republican	Gary Finch	25,730	
Conservative	Gary Finch	3,443	
Independence	Gary Finch	1,154	
Reform	Gary Finch	178	
Total	Gary Finch (incumbent)	30,505	56.7
Democratic	Keith Batman	21,698	
Working Families	Keith Batman	1,087	
Women's Equality	Keith Batman	532	
Total	Keith Batman	23,317	43.3
Write-in		14	0.0
Total votes		53,836	100.0
Republican hold			

=== 2016 ===
2016 New York State Assembly election, District 126
Party	Candidate	Votes	%
Republican	Gary Finch	30,634	
Conservative	Gary Finch	4,189	
Independence	Gary Finch	1,968	
Reform	Gary Finch	287	
Total	Gary Finch (incumbent)	37,078	61.6
Democratic	Diane Dwire	20,857	
Working Families	Diane Dwire	1,576	
Women's Equality	Diane Dwire	614	
Total	Diane Dwire	23,047	38.3
Write-in		33	0.1
Total votes		60,158	100.0
Republican hold			

=== 2014 ===
2014 New York State Assembly election, District 126
Party	Candidate	Votes	%
Republican	Gary Finch	18,688	
Conservative	Gary Finch	3,396	
Independence	Gary Finch	1,239	
Total	Gary Finch (incumbent)	23,323	55.0
Democratic	Diane Dwire	16,714	
Working Families	Diane Dwire	2,305	
Total	Diane Dwire	19,019	44.9
Write-in		30	0.1
Total votes		42,371	100.0
Republican hold			

=== 2012 ===
2012 New York State Assembly election, District 126
Party	Candidate	Votes	%
Republican	Gary Finch	32,823	
Independence	Gary Finch	6,522	
Conservative	Gary Finch	4,867	
Total	Gary Finch (incumbent)	44,212	99.0
Write-in		431	1.0
Total votes		44,643	100.0
Republican hold			
