= New York's 65th State Assembly district =

American legislative district

Assemblymember
Grace Lee; D–Financial District

New York's 65th State Assembly district is one of the 150 districts in the New York State Assembly. It has been represented by Democrat Grace Lee since 2023, succeeding Yuh-Line Niou. In 2026, she announced that she would not seek re-election.

== Geography ==
=== 2020s ===
District 65 is located in Manhattan, comprising Chinatown and the Lower East Side.

The district is entirely within New York's 10th congressional district and New York's 27th State Senate district, and partially overlaps the 1st and 2nd districts of the New York City Council.

=== 2012-2022 ===
District 65 is located in Manhattan, comprising Chinatown, the Financial District, and the Lower East Side.

== Recent election results ==
=== 2026 ===
2026 New York State Assembly election, District 65
Primary election
Party	Candidate	Votes	%
Democratic	Illapa Sairitupac	4,417	36.9
Democratic	Jasmin Sanchez	2,095	17.5
Democratic	Wei-Li Tjong	1,822	15.2
Democratic	Jay Jacky Wong	1,819	15.2
Democratic	Mariama James	1,258	10.5
Democratic	Lilah Mejia	533	4.4
Write-in		39	0.3
Total votes		11,983	100.0
General election
Democratic	Illapa Sairitupac		
Republican	Helen Qiu		
Write-in			
Total votes			100.0

=== 2024 ===
2024 New York State Assembly election, District 65
Party	Candidate	Votes	%
Democratic	Grace Lee	29,492	
Working Families	Grace Lee	4,138	
Total	Grace Lee (incumbent)	33,630	99.1
Write-in		302	0.9
Total votes		33,932	100.0
Democratic hold			

=== 2022 ===
2022 New York State Assembly election, District 65
Primary election
Party	Candidate	Votes	%
Democratic	Grace Lee	4,653	48.6
Democratic	Illapa Sairitupac	3,305	34.5
Democratic	Denny Salas	1,312	13.7
Democratic	Alana Sivin	285	3.0
Write-in		18	0.2
Total votes		9,573	100.0
General election
Democratic	Grace Lee	20,495	76.0
Republican	Helen Qiu	6,381	23.7
Write-in		81	0.3
Total votes		26,957	100.0
Democratic hold			

=== 2020 ===
2020 New York State Assembly election, District 65
Primary election
Party	Candidate	Votes	%
Democratic	Yuh-Line Niou (incumbent)	8,749	64.0
Democratic	Grace Lee	4,877	35.6
Write-in		50	0.4
Total votes		13,676	100.0
General election
Democratic	Yuh-Line Niou	34,480	
Working Families	Yuh-Line Niou	6,074	
Total	Yuh-Line Niou (incumbent)	40,554	99.1
Write-in		374	0.9
Total votes		40,928	100.0
Democratic hold			

=== 2018 ===
2018 New York State Assembly election, District 65
Party	Candidate	Votes	%
Democratic	Yuh-Line Niou	28,755	
Working Families	Yuh-Line Niou	2,206	
Total	Yuh-Line Niou (incumbent)	30,461	97.6
Write-in		264	2.4
Total votes		31,225	100.0
Democratic hold			

=== 2016 ===
2016 New York State Assembly election, District 65
Primary election
Party	Candidate	Votes	%
Democratic	Yuh-Line Niou	2,790	31.4
Democratic	Jenifer Rajkumar	1,701	19.2
Democratic	Paul Newell	1,425	16.0
Democratic	Alice Cancel (incumbent)	1,108	12.5
Democratic	Don Lee	995	11.2
Democratic	Gigi Li	844	9.5
Write-in		17	0.2
Total votes		8,880	100.0
General election
Democratic	Yuh-Line Niou	27,987	
Working Families	Yuh-Line Niou	1,729	
Total	Yuh-Line Niou	29,716	76.1
Republican	Bryan Jung	5,624	
Reform	Bryan Jung	137	
Total	Bryan Jung	5,761	14.7
Women's Equality	Alice Cancel (incumbent)	2,171	5.5
Green	Manny Cavaco	1,348	3.5
Write-in		64	0.2
Total votes		39,060	100.0
Democratic hold			

=== 2016 special ===
Incumbent Sheldon Silver was expelled from the New York State Assembly after he was found guilty in a federal corruption investigation, triggering a special election. In special elections for state legislative offices, primaries are usually not held – county committee members for each party select nominees.

2016 New York State Assembly special election, District 65
Party	Candidate	Votes	%
Democratic	Alice Cancel	7,873	41.3
Working Families	Yuh-Line Niou	6,654	34.9
Republican	Lester Chang	2,972	
Independence	Lester Chang	503	
Clean Up The Mess	Lester Chang	155	
Reform	Lester Chang	122	
Total	Lester Chang	3,752	19.7
Green	Dennis Levy	714	3.7
Write-in		53	0.4
Total votes		19,046	100.0
Democratic hold			

=== 2014 ===
2014 New York State Assembly election, District 65
Party	Candidate	Votes	%
Democratic	Sheldon Silver	9,978	
Working Families	Sheldon Silver	1,477	
Total	Sheldon Silver (incumbent)	11,455	82.0
Republican	Maureen Koetz	2,442	17.5
Write-in		69	0.5
Total votes		13,966	100.0
Democratic hold			

=== 2012 ===
2012 New York State Assembly election, District 65
Party	Candidate	Votes	%
Democratic	Sheldon Silver	23,886	
Working Families	Sheldon Silver	1,258	
Total	Sheldon Silver (incumbent)	25,144	83.5
Republican	Wave Chan	4,907	16.3
Write-in		40	0.1
Total votes		30,099	100.0
Democratic win (new boundaries)			

=== 2010 ===
2010 New York State Assembly election, District 65
Party	Candidate	Votes	%
Democratic	Micah Kellner	21,143	
Working Families	Micah Kellner	1,598	
Total	Micah Kellner (incumbent)	22,741	73.9
Republican	Michael Zumbluskas	7,998	26.0
Write-in		23	0.1
Total votes		30,762	100.0
Democratic hold			

=== 2008 ===
2008 New York State Assembly election, District 65
Party	Candidate	Votes	%
Democratic	Micah Kellner	35,546	
Working Families	Micah Kellner	1,126	
Total	Micah Kellner (incumbent)	36,672	75.9
Republican	Georgiana Viest	11,629	24.1
Write-in		1	0.0
Total votes		48,302	100.0
Democratic hold			

=== 2007 special ===
Incumbent Pete Grannis resigned on April 10, 2007 after being appointed commissioner of the New York State Department of Environmental Conservation by then-Governor Eliot Spitzer, triggering a special election. In special elections for state legislative offices, primaries are usually not held – county committee members for each party select nominees.

2007 New York State Assembly special election, District 65
Party	Candidate	Votes	%
Democratic	Micah Kellner	3,947	
Working Families	Micah Kellner	307	
Total	Micah Kellner	4,254	65.2
Republican	Gregory Camp	1,803	
Independence	Gregory Camp	470	
Total	Gregory Camp	2,273	34.8
Write-in		3	0.0
Total votes		6,530	100.0
Democratic hold			

=== 2006 ===
2006 New York State Assembly election, District 65
Party	Candidate	Votes	%
Democratic	Pete Grannis	24,046	
Working Families	Pete Grannis	1,288	
Total	Pete Grannis (incumbent)	25,334	82.2
Republican	Michael Fandal	5,499	17.8
Write-in		3	0.0
Total votes		30,836	100.0
Democratic hold			

=== 2004 ===
2004 New York State Assembly election, District 65
Party	Candidate	Votes	%
Democratic	Pete Grannis	36,900	
Working Families	Pete Grannis	1,017	
Total	Pete Grannis (incumbent)	37,917	76.4
Republican	Patricia Leslie	11,710	23.6
Write-in		0	0.0
Total votes		30,836	100.0
Democratic hold			

=== 2002 ===
2002 New York State Assembly election, District 65
Party	Candidate	Votes	%
Democratic	Pete Grannis	17,925	
Working Families	Pete Grannis	675	
Total	Pete Grannis (incumbent)	18,600	66.4
Republican	David Friedman	8,241	
Independence	David Friedman	484	
Liberal	David Friedman	296	
Total	David Friedman	9,021	32.2
Green	Ivana Edwards	377	1.4
Write-in		0	0.0
Total votes		27,998	100.0
Democratic win (new boundaries)			

=== 2000 ===
2000 New York State Assembly election, District 65
Party	Candidate	Votes	%
Democratic	Pete Grannis	33,759	
Working Families	Pete Grannis	809	
Total	Pete Grannis (incumbent)	34,568	74.0
Republican	Peter McCoy	11,537	24.7
Independence	Edward Price	597	1.3
Write-in		0	0.0
Total votes		46,702	100.0
Democratic hold			
