= 2016 New York State Assembly 65th district special election =

- April 19, 2016

New York State Assembly 65th district

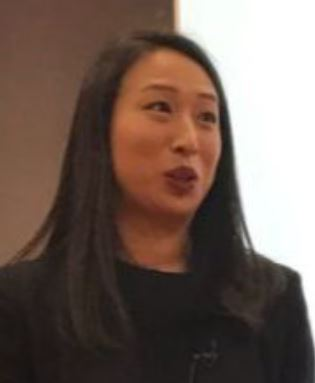

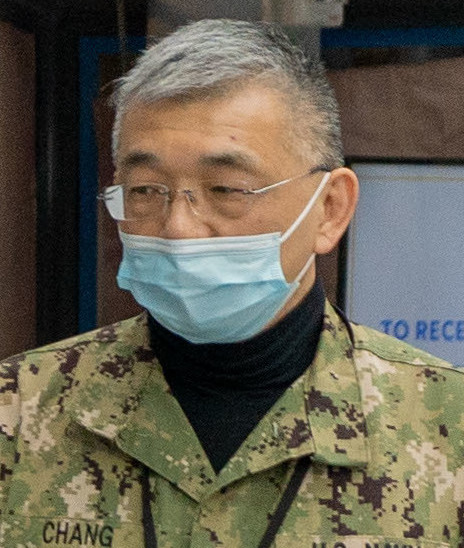
Nominee	Alice Cancel	Yuh-Line Niou	Lester Chang
Party	Democratic	Working Families	Republican
Alliance			Independence; Reform
Popular vote	7,873	6,654	3,752
Percentage	41.34%	34.94%	19.70%
- Precinct results Cancel: 30–40% 40–50% 50–60% 60–70% 70–80% 80–90% Niou: 30–40% 40–50% 50–60% Chang: 30–40% >90% Tie: 30–40%
Member of the New York State Assembly before election
Sheldon Silver
Democratic
Elected Member of the New York State Assembly
Alice Cancel
Democratic

The 2016 New York State Assembly 65th district special election was held on April 19, 2016. Democratic nominee Alice Cancel defeated Working Families nominee Yuh-Line Niou, Republican nominee Lester Chang, and Green nominee Dennis Levy to succeed Representative Sheldon Silver in the New York State Assembly from the 65th district.

Silver had served in the state assembly since 1976, and as Speaker since 1994, but he resigned and was convicted for a corruption scandal. Cancel won the Democratic nomination although Niou and Jenifer Rajkumar accused the process of being undemocratic. Chang received the nominations of the Republican, Independence, Reform, and Clean Up The Mess parties while Levy received the Green nomination.

Niou ran in the special election with the Working Families nomination, but Cancel won in the election. Niou later defeated Cancel in the 2016 primary and Rajkumar was elected to the state assembly after the 2020 election.

== Background ==
Representative Sheldon Silver was first elected to the New York State Assembly in the 1976 election and was selected to serve as Speaker in 1994. Silver resigned from the speakership and state assembly and was later convicted in a $5 million corruption case. Governor Andrew Cuomo called a special election for the seat alongside special elections for the 59th and 62nd assembly districts and the 9th Senate district.

== Campaign ==
=== Candidates ===
==== Democratic ====
The candidate was selected by 185 County Committee members using weighed votes. Yuh-Line Niou announced at the end of her five-minute speech at the selection meeting that she was dropping out stating that the nomination process was flawed. Alice Cancel defeated Paul Newell, Jenifer Rajkumar, Niou, and Gigi Li for the Democratic nomination. Rajkumar also stated that the selection process was undemocratic.

2016 New York State Assembly 65th district special Democratic selection
Party	Candidate	Votes	%
Democratic	Alice Cancel	5,772	70.04%
Democratic	Paul Newell	1,770.5	21.49%
Democratic	Jenifer Rajkumar	605	7.34%
Democratic	Yuh-Line Niou	93	1.13%
Democratic	Gigi Li	0	0.00%
Total votes		8,240.5	100.00%

==== Other ====
Newell declined the nomination of the Independence Party of New York. Dennis Levy, the president of the New York State Committee to Legalize Marijuana, ran with the nomination of the Green Party. Lester Chang appeared on the ballot with the nominations of the Republican, Independence, Reform, and Clean Up The Mess parties.

=== Results and aftermath ===
The Lo-Down moderated two candidate forums during the campaign which included Cancel, Niou, Chang, and Levy. Cancel defeated Niou, Chang, and Levy in the election. During the 2016 election Niou defeated Cancel for the Democratic nomination and Niou won in the general election after defeating Republican nominee Bryan Jung, Green nominee Manny Cavaco, and Cancel who appeared on the ballot with the Women's Equality Party's nomination. Rajkumar was later elected to the state assembly from the 38th district during the 2020 election. Chang was later elected to the state assembly from the 49th district during the 2022 election.

== Results ==
2016 New York State Assembly 65th district special election
Party	Candidate	Votes	%
Democratic	Alice Cancel	7,873	41.34%
Working Families	Yuh-Line Niou	6,654	34.94%
Republican	Lester Chang	2,972	15.60%
Independence	Lester Chang	503	2.64%
Clean Up This Mess	Lester Chang	155	0.81%
Reform	Lester Chang	122	0.64%
Total	Lester Chang	3,712	19.49%
Green	Dennis Levy	714	3.75%
Independent	Write-ins	93	0.49%
Total votes		19,046	100.00%
Total	Invalid	892	

== Endorsements ==
Cancel endorsements

Local officials

- Margaret Chin, member of the New York City Council from the 1st district
- Margarita López, former member of the New York City Council from the 2nd district
Chang endorsements

Local officials

- Rudy Giuliani, 107th Mayor of New York City

Newspapers

- New York Post
Niou endorsements

State officials

- Marcos Crespo, member of the New York State Assembly from the 85th district
- Maritza Davila, member of the New York State Assembly from the 53rd district
- Brad Hoylman, member of the New York State Senate from the 27th district
- Brian P. Kavanagh, member of the New York State Assembly from the 74th district
- Francisco Moya, member of the New York State Assembly from the 39th district
- N. Nick Perry, member of the New York State Assembly from the 58th district
- Robert J. Rodriguez, member of the New York State Assembly from the 68th district
- Linda Rosenthal, member of the New York State Assembly from the 67th district
- Luis R. Sepúlveda, member of the New York State Assembly from the 87th district
- Daniel Squadron, member of the New York State Senate from the 26th district

Local officials

- Rubén Díaz Jr., 13th Borough president of The Bronx
- Letitia James, 4th New York City Public Advocate
- John Liu, 43rd New York City Comptroller
- Carlos Menchaca, member of the New York City Council from the 38th district
- Scott Stringer, 44th New York City Comptroller
- Antonio Reynoso, member of the New York City Council from the 34th district
- Ritchie Torres, member of the New York City Council from the 15th district

Organizations

- New York State United Teachers
- United Federation of Teachers

Newspapers

- The New York Times
