= Dennis Levy =

- Born: Dennis Wayne Levy; December 26, 1948 (age 77); Wyoming, Ohio
- Occupations: Founder, Chief Executive Officer
- Years active: 15
- Spouse: 1
- Children: 2

Dennis Levy (born December 26, 1948) is an American community organizer and public health activist who used to live with HIV/AIDS. He is now U=U i.e. Undetectable and untransmittable. Levy is the CEO and founder of the Black and Latino AIDS Coalition, Inc a community-based AIDS advocacy organization. It advocates on behalf of Black and Latino people with AIDS and their families and works for the prevention of HIV and AIDS. In 1998, Levy helped pass HIV Reporting and Partner Notification. It was the most controversial HIV legislation in New York State history. The legislation changed the way New York State tracked new HIV and AIDS cases via partner notification. Before the legislation, the federal government's Ryan White Program allocated money based on the proportion of patients with AIDS in each region. The highest number of AIDS cases was in New York City among white gay men. Consequently, the white gay population received the most money. The new legislation changed this allocation to give more funding to people who were newly diagnosed with HIV infection. A majority of people with HIV diagnoses were black and Latino heterosexuals. Assemblywoman Nettie Mayersohn sponsored a bill that required people infected with HIV to notify their sexual partners. Blac NY was the only AIDS organization in New York State to support the bill. Levy engaged in heated debates in the HIV community concerning the need for establishing a system of tracking HIV infection.

== Blac NY ==
Dennis Levy, Rick Levy, and his brother Harry Levy founded the Black and Latino AIDS Coalition, Inc (Blac NY). It was one of the nation's first AIDS organizations for heterosexual black and Latino people living with AIDS. Blac NY was modeled after the national direct action advocacy group ACT UP and received financial assistance and technical help from Gay Men's Health Crisis (GMHC). Under Levy's leadership, Blac NY educated thousands of black and Latino heterosexuals about AIDS. He helped turn public attention to the crisis by writing about "AIDS in the hood". Levy challenged the mainstream AIDS establishment on the issues of mandatory reporting and partner notification.

Dennis Levy was part of the changing face of AIDS as a heterosexual African American man. Heterosexual African Americans represented one of the largest and fastest growing populations for new AIDS cases. Levy addressed the homophobic fears of African American heterosexual men. Blac NY worked to get the help of black and Latino churches in the fight against HIV/AIDS. The effort resulted in over 30 national HIV/AIDS organizations and leaders calling for the development and implementation of a comprehensive national AIDS strategy. On July 13, 2010, the White House released the National HIV/AIDS Strategy (NHAS), the nation's first comprehensive, coordinated HIV/AIDS roadmap with clear and measurable targets.

== Marijuana legalization ==
For his AIDS, Levy began a regimen that included an antiviral therapy, but the therapy's side effects included disorientation and nausea and caused pain throughout his body. Nothing he tried reduced the side effects. A friend suggested Levy try smoking marijuana. Levy began smoking marijuana regularly and it helped him with his side effects from AIDS medicines and eliminated the incredible headaches he used to get. He discovered many people used marijuana for similar reasons. There is evidence that medical marijuana works. Levy decided to become an advocate for legal medical marijuana, so he founded the New York State Committee to Legalize Marijuana with Rick Levy. Dennis Levy became President and Rick Levy was Vice President of Social Media. Levy has worked with International social and political activist Dana Beal in advocating for the legalization of marijuana.

== Politics ==
Levy is a member of the Green Party of New York. He was the Green party candidate for the New York State Assembly Seat of the convicted speaker Sheldon Silver in an April 19, 2016, special election. Levy faced Democratic candidate Alice Cancel, Republican Lester Chang, and Working Families Party candidate Yuh-Line Niou. Yuh-Line Niou won the election. Dennis Levy changed back to a Democrat in 2018. He was heavily involved in supporting Eric Adams to become New York City Mayor.
