= New York's 135th State Assembly district =

American legislative district

Assemblymember
Jennifer Lunsford; D–Perinton

New York's 135th State Assembly district is one of the 150 districts in the New York State Assembly. It has been represented by Jennifer Lunsford since 2021.

== Geography ==
District 135 is located entirely within Monroe County, comprising the eastern portion of the county. It contains the towns of Penfield, East Rochester, Pittsford, Perinton, and Mendon.

== Recent election results ==
=== 2026 ===
2026 New York State Assembly election, District 135
Party	Candidate	Votes	%
Democratic	Jennifer Lunsford		
Working Families	Jennifer Lunsford		
Total	Jennifer Lunsford (incumbent)		
Republican	Kalinda Washington		
Conservative	Kalinda Washington		
Total	Kalinda Washington		
Write-in			
Total votes			

=== 2024 ===
2024 New York State Assembly election, District 135
Party	Candidate	Votes	%
Democratic	Jennifer Lunsford	42,653	
Working Families	Jennifer Lunsford	2,831	
Total	Jennifer Lunsford (incumbent)	45,484	58.0
Republican	Kimberly DeRosa	28,393	
Conservative	Kimberly DeRosa	4,515	
Total	Kimberly DeRosa	32,908	42.0
Write-in		27	0.0
Total votes		78,419	100.0
Democratic hold			

=== 2022 ===
2022 New York State Assembly election, District 135
Party	Candidate	Votes	%
Democratic	Jennifer Lunsford	33,242	
Working Families	Jennifer Lunsford	2,327	
Total	Jennifer Lunsford (incumbent)	35,569	55.4
Republican	Joseph Chenelly	23,927	
Conservative	Joseph Chenelly	4,747	
Total	Joseph Chenelly	28,674	44.6
Write-in		12	0.0
Total votes		64,255	100.0
Democratic hold			

=== 2020 ===
2020 New York State Assembly election, District 135
Party	Candidate	Votes	%
Democratic	Jennifer Lunsford	38,570	
Working Families	Jennifer Lunsford	2,994	
Total	Jennifer Lunsford	41,564	50.4
Republican	Mark Johns	34,213	
Conservative	Mark Johns	5,387	
Independence	Mark Johns	1,233	
Total	Mark Johns (incumbent)	40,833	49.6
Write-in		16	0.0
Total votes		82,413	100.0
Democratic gain from Republican			

=== 2018 ===
2018 New York State Assembly election, District 135
Party	Candidate	Votes	%
Republican	Mark Johns	27,293	
Conservative	Mark Johns	4,811	
Independence	Mark Johns	1,182	
Reform	Mark Johns	256	
Total	Mark Johns (incumbent)	33,542	52.3
Democratic	Andrew Gilchrist	29,198	
Working Families	Andrew Gilchrist	869	
Women's Equality	Andrew Gilchrist	572	
Total	Andrew Gilchrist	30,639	47.7
Write-in		17	0.0
Total votes		64,198	100.0
Republican hold			

=== 2016 ===
2016 New York State Assembly election, District 20
Primary election
Party	Candidate	Votes	%
Working Families	Mark Johns (incumbent)	13	50.0
Working Families	Dorothy Styk	13	50.0
Write-in		0	0.0
Total votes		26	100
General election
Republican	Mark Johns	34,386	
Conservative	Mark Johns	5,610	
Independence	Mark Johns	2,309	
Reform	Mark Johns	311	
Total	Mark Johns (incumbent)	42,616	59.9
Democratic	Dorothy Styk	27,157	
Women's Equality	Dorothy Styk	1,401	
Total	Dorothy Styk	28,558	40.1
Write-in		22	0.0
Total votes		71,196	100.0
Republican hold			

=== 2014 ===
2014 New York State Assembly election, District 135
Primary election
Party	Candidate	Votes	%
Republican	Mark Johns (incumbent)	1,829	85.9
Republican	Calvin Frelier	299	14.1
Write-in		0	0.0
Total votes		2,128	100
General election
Republican	Mark Johns	26,468	
Conservative	Mark Johns	5,197	
Independence	Mark Johns	3,824	
Working Families	Mark Johns	2,331	
Total	Mark Johns (incumbent)	37,820	99.4
Write-in		202	0.6
Total votes		38,022	100.0
Republican hold			

=== 2012 ===
2012 New York State Assembly election, District 135
Party	Candidate	Votes	%
Republican	Mark Johns	28,535	
Conservative	Mark Johns	4,706	
Independence	Mark Johns	1,627	
Total	Mark Johns (incumbent)	34,868	51.1
Democratic	David Koon	33,399	48.9
Write-in		31	0.0
Total votes		68,298	100.0
Republican hold			

=== 2010 ===
2010 New York State Assembly election, District 135
Party	Candidate	Votes	%
Republican	Mark Johns	22,029	
Conservative	Mark Johns	4,855	
Total	Mark Johns	26,884	51.3
Democratic	David Koon	21,755	
Independence	David Koon	2,633	
Working Families	David Koon	1,097	
Total	David Koon	25,485	48.7
Write-in		22	0.0
Total votes		52,391	100.0
Republican hold			
