= John Lemondes Jr. =

American politician and businessman

John Lemondes

Member of the New York State Assembly from the 126th district
- Incumbent
- Assumed office January 6, 2021
- Preceded by: Gary Finch
- Succeeded by: Ian Phillips (elect)

Personal details
- Born: March 5, 1965 (age 61) Liverpool, New York, U.S.
- Party: Republican
- Education: Pennsylvania State University (BS); Syracuse University (MBA, MPA)

John Lemondes Jr. is an American politician and businessman serving as a member of the New York State Assembly from the 126th district. Elected in November 2020, he assumed office on January 6, 2021.

== Early life and education ==
Lemondes is Greek-American. He earned a Bachelor of Science degree in agriculture from Pennsylvania State University, a Master of Business Administration from Syracuse University, and a Master of Arts in public administration from Maxwell School of Citizenship and Public Affairs.

== Career ==
Lemondes served in the United States Army for 27 years, retiring with the rank of Colonel. During his tenure, Lemondes worked as a project manager for the United States Army Chemical Materials Activity and as a speechwriter. After retiring from the Army, Lemondes worked as a military and defense consultant for ASI Government and Saab AB. In 2014, Lemondes was a candidate for New York's 24th congressional district, placing second in the Republican primary after John Katko. Lemondes and his wife operate a family farm. He was elected to the New York State Assembly in November 2020 and assumed office on January 6, 2021.

In August 2025, Lemondes announced that he would run for the U.S. House of Representatives in New York's 22nd congressional district, challenging incumbent John Mannion. He dropped out of the race in January 2026.

At the 2026 New York State Assembly election, he was unseated by Democrat Ian Phillips.

== Political positions ==
Lemondes supports Donald Trump and his policies, including the One Big Beautiful Bill Act. He has endorsed Trump's false claims that the 2020 United States presidential election was stolen and supports Trump's decision to pardon rioters who participated in the January 6 United States Capitol attack. Lemondes opposes abortion rights and declined to say how he would vote on a bill to restrict abortion if elected to Congress, but supports exceptions for rape, incest, or to save the life of the mother.

During his tenure in the New York State Assembly, Lemondes marked a conservative voting record, having rarely broken with the Assembly's Republican minority, and was a frequent critic of Governor Kathy Hochul and the Assembly's Democratic majority, particularly toward the issues of immigration and crime. He criticized mask mandates for New York school children during the COVID-19 pandemic in New York as "draconian" and later called for their repeal.

In June 2025, following the No Kings protests, Lemondes wrote an op-ed in which he called the rallies "billionaire-funded propaganda". When asked to elaborate, Lemondes asserted that some of the 5,000 protesters who participated in a No Kings rally in Syracuse were paid to participate by George Soros, but had no evidence to support his claims.
