= Grace Lee (politician) =

American politician

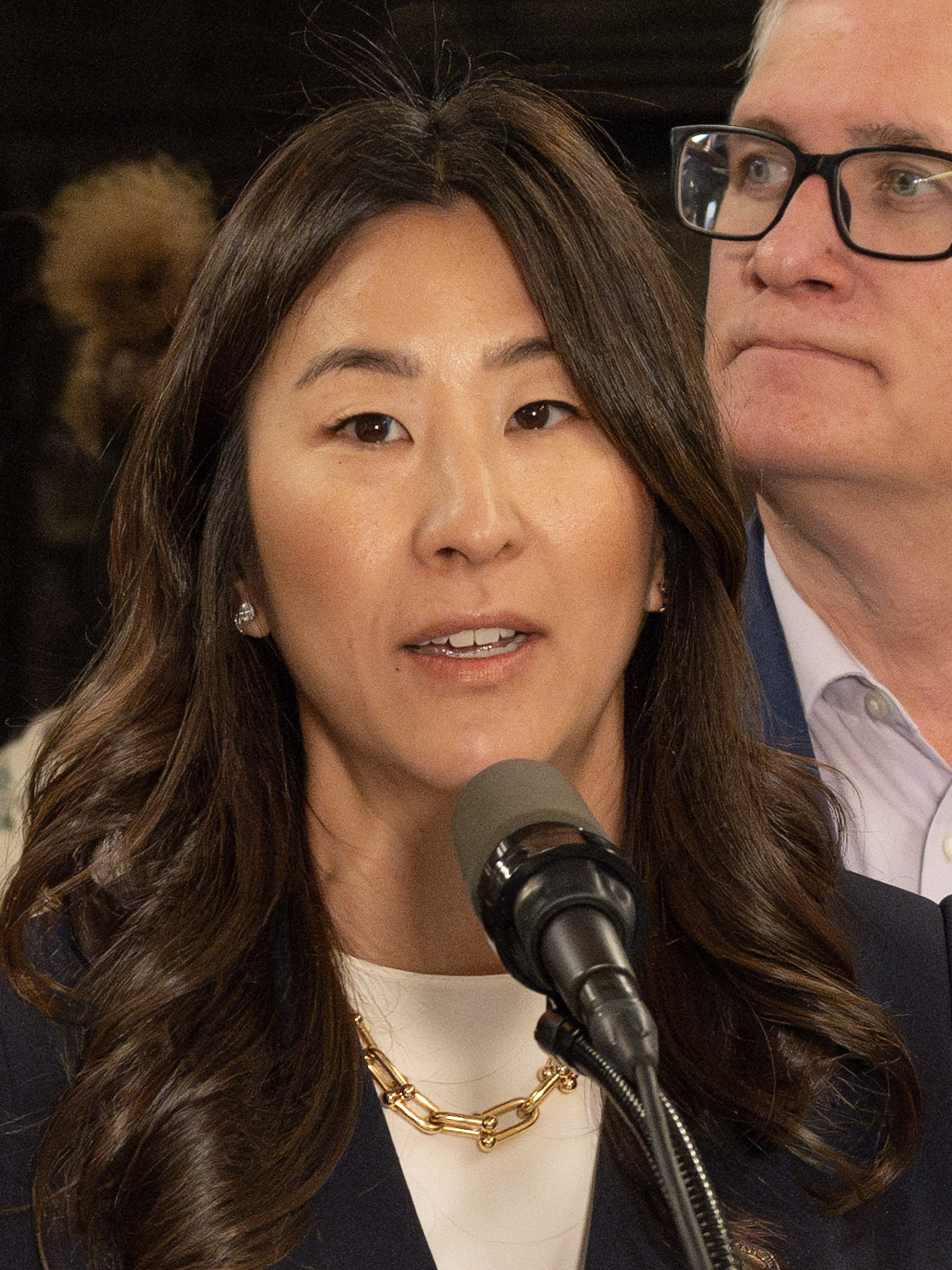

Member of the New York State Assembly from the 65th district
- Incumbent
- Assumed office January 1, 2023
- Preceded by: Yuh-Line Niou

Personal details
- Born: 1982 or 1983 (age 43–44)
- Party: Democratic
- Education: Columbia University (BA); University of Chicago (MBA)
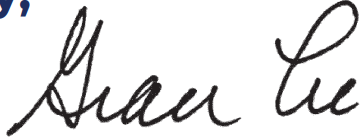
- Signature
- Website: Campaign website State Assembly website

Grace Lee (born 1982 or 1983) is an American politician who is a member of the New York State Assembly for the 65th district. First elected in 2022, she assumed office on January 1, 2023. She is the first Korean American woman elected to the New York State Legislature.

Lee is running in the 2026 Democratic primary election for New York's 27th State Senate district, to fill the seat vacated by retiring state senator Brian P. Kavanagh.

== Education ==
Lee earned a Bachelor of Arts degree in economics and philosophy from Columbia University in 2002 and a Master of Business Administration in finance and entrepreneurship from the University of Chicago Booth School of Business.

== Career ==
From 2002 to 2006, Lee worked as an equities research associate at JPMorgan Chase. She briefly worked as an equity research associate at UBS before joining FSI Group, LLC in 2007. She founded Nine Naturals, a skincare company in 2008. Lee was an unsuccessful candidate for the 65th district of the New York State Assembly in 2020, losing to the incumbent Yuh-Line Niou. Lee was elected to the New York State Assembly in November 2022 and took office January 1, 2023.

Lee is a member of the Vote Blue Coalition, a progressive group federal PAC created to support Democrats in New York, New Jersey, and Pennsylvania through voter outreach and mobilization efforts.

== New York State Assembly ==
Lee is the co-chair of the Asian Pacific American Task Force in the New York State Assembly.

She launched a pilot program with Henry Street Settlement to distribute Ring video doorbells to seniors living in public housing on the Lower East Side.

In 2023, she worked with the New York City Sheriff's Joint Compliance Task Force to raid illegal cannabis shops that had opened after cannabis was legalized in New York City.

=== New York State Senate campaign ===
In January 2026, Lee announced she was going to run for the 27th district of the New York State Senate after Brian P. Kavanagh announced his retirement. Lee's campaign was endorsed by Kavanagh. The 27th district comprises the neighborhoods of Soho, Little Italy, Tribeca, Greenwich Village, The Financial District, Chinatown, and The East Village. Lee was endorsed by various Democrats. Lee won the primary on June 23 by defeating former New York State Assemblywoman Yuh-line Niou.

== Personal life ==
Lee lives in Lower Manhattan with her husband and three daughters.

== See also ==
- Korean Americans in New York City
