= Arnaldo Ferraro =

American politician

Arnaldo A. Ferraro (born September 3, 1936, in Mascalucia, Sicily), is an American politician from New York.

== Biography ==
He was born on September 3, 1936, in Italy, in Mascalucia, a small town in Sicily near Catania. He emigrated to the United States in 1961 and later founded the Fiorello LaGuardia Republican Organization and the National Federation of Italian-American Societies. He graduated B.S. from Fordham University, and is also a Ph.D.

He was a member of the New York State Assembly (49th D.) in 1985 and 1986. In November 1986, he ran for re-election but was defeated by Democrat Peter J. Abbate Jr. He was the first italian deputy in Albany.

More recently, Ferraro ran for Chairman of the Kings County Republican Committee in 2009. He resides in the Dyker Heights section of Brooklyn with his wife Gina.

New York State Assembly
| Preceded by Louis Freda | New York State Assembly; 49th District; 1985–1986 | Succeeded by Peter J. Abbate Jr. |
