= Joyce Xiaoqiong Xie =

American politician

Member-elect of the New York State Assembly from the 49th district
- Assuming office January 2027
- Succeeding: Lester Chang

Personal details
- Party: Democratic

Joyce Xiaoqiong Xie (born 1993/1994; Chinese: 谢晓琼; pinyin: Xiè Xiǎoqióng) is an American politician. She is the Democratic member-elect of the New York State Assembly from the 49th district.

Xie was born in 1993 or 1994 in China and emigrated to the United States. She studied in college and became a financial services professional.

Xie started working for New York City Council member Susan Zhuang as her budget director and community liaison. In 2026, she supported Nikki Lucas' controversial bid to become chair of the Brooklyn Democratic Party. Her experience in the Democratic Party includes district leader and state committee member. She also previously served in the New York City Department of Education Geographic District 20's Community Education Council.

Xie ran in the New York's 49th State Assembly district in the 2026 election, contesting Republican incumbent Lester Chang. The day after the general election, she was leading Cheng 53% to 47%, though New York Focus and The New York Times had not called the race by then. Her victory was part of a blue wave in the southern Brooklyn area amidst the 2026 midterm elections.
