= New York's 49th State Assembly district =

American legislative district

Assemblymember
Lester Chang; R–Midwood

New York's 49th State Assembly district is one of the 150 districts in the New York State Assembly. It has been represented by Lester Chang since 2023.

== Geography ==
District 49 is in Brooklyn. It contains portions of Dyker Heights, Sunset Park, Borough Park and Bensonhurst.

The district overlaps (partially) with New York's 9th, 10th and 11th congressional districts, the 17th, 22nd and 26th districts of the New York State Senate, and the 38th, 43rd and 47th districts of the New York City Council.

=== 2010s ===
District 49 is in Brooklyn. It contains portions of Dyker Heights, Sunset Park, and Bensonhurst.

== Recent election results ==
=== 2026 ===
2026 New York State Assembly election, District 49
Party	Candidate	Votes	%
Republican	Lester Chang		
Conservative	Lester Chang		
Total	Lester Chang (incumbent)		
Democratic	Joyce Xie		
Write-in			
Total votes			100.0

=== 2024 ===
2024 New York State Assembly election, District 49
Party	Candidate	Votes	%
Republican	Lester Chang	12,951	
Conservative	Lester Chang	2,142	
Total	Lester Chang (incumbent)	15,093	97.3
Write-in		425	2.7
Total votes		15,518	100.0
Republican hold			

=== 2022 ===
2022 New York State Assembly election, District 49
Party	Candidate	Votes	%
Republican	Lester Chang	6,888	
Conservative	Lester Chang	536	
Total	Lester Chang	7,424	52.0
Democratic	Peter Abbate Jr. (incumbent)	6,842	47.9
Write-in		21	0.1
Total votes		14,287	100.0
Republican gain from Democratic			

=== 2020 ===
2020 New York State Assembly election, District 49
Party	Candidate	Votes	%
Democratic	Peter Abbate Jr.	16,606	
Independence	Peter Abbate Jr.	1,498	
Total	Peter Abbate Jr. (incumbent)	18,104	99.1
Write-in		162	0.9
Total votes		18,266	100.0
Democratic hold			

=== 2018 ===
2018 New York State Assembly election, District 49
Party	Candidate	Votes	%
Democratic	Peter Abbate Jr.	9,910	
Working Families	Peter Abbate Jr.	539	
Independence	Peter Abbate Jr.	350	
Total	Peter Abbate Jr. (incumbent)	10,799	84.2
Conservative	Rosemary Mangino	2,017	15.7
Write-in		9	0.1
Total votes		12,825	100.0
Democratic hold			

=== 2016 ===
2016 New York State Assembly election, District 49
Party	Candidate	Votes	%
Democratic	Peter Abbate Jr.	12,486	
Working Families	Peter Abbate Jr.	891	
Independence	Peter Abbate Jr.	447	
Total	Peter Abbate Jr. (incumbent)	13,824	75.5
Republican	Rosemary Mangino	3,903	
Conservative	Rosemary Mangino	571	
Total	Rosemary Mangino	4,474	24.4
Write-in		21	0.1
Total votes		18,319	100.0
Democratic hold			

=== 2014 ===
2014 New York State Assembly election, District 49
Party	Candidate	Votes	%
Democratic	Peter Abbate Jr.	4,305	
Working Families	Peter Abbate Jr.	347	
Independence	Peter Abbate Jr.	220	
Total	Peter Abbate Jr. (incumbent)	4,872	76.0
Republican	Henry Lallave	1,190	
Conservative	Henry Lallave	346	
Total	Henry Lallave	1,536	23.9
Write-in		9	0.1
Total votes		6,417	100.0
Democratic hold			

=== 2012 ===
2012 New York State Assembly election, District 49
Party	Candidate	Votes	%
Democratic	Peter Abbate Jr.	10,980	
Working Families	Peter Abbate Jr.	759	
Independence	Peter Abbate Jr.	369	
Total	Peter Abbate Jr. (incumbent)	12,108	89.3
Conservative	Vincent Katinas	1,429	10.5
Write-in		15	0.2
Total votes		13,552	100.0
Democratic hold			

=== 2010 ===
2010 New York State Assembly election, District 49
Primary election
Party	Candidate	Votes	%
Republican	Peter Cipriano	644	66.4
Republican	Lucretia Regina-Potter	326	33.6
Write-in		0	0.1
Total votes		970	100.0
Conservative	Peter Cipriano	49	86.0
Write-in		8	14.0
Total votes		57	100.0
General election
Democratic	Peter Abbate Jr.	6,690	
Independence	Peter Abbate Jr.	416	
Working Families	Peter Abbate Jr.	310	
Total	Peter Abbate Jr. (incumbent)	7,416	60.8
Republican	Peter Cipriano	3,987	
Conservative	Peter Cipriano	672	
Total	Peter Cipriano	4,659	38.2
Write-in		116	1.0
Total votes		12,191	100.0
Democratic hold			

=== 2008 ===
2008 New York State Assembly election, District 49
Party	Candidate	Votes	%
Democratic	Peter Abbate Jr.	13,106	
Working Families	Peter Abbate Jr.	928	
Total	Peter Abbate Jr. (incumbent)	14,034	71.9
Republican	Lucretia Regina-Potter	4,787	
Conservative	Lucretia Regina-Potter	470	
Independence	Lucretia Regina-Potter	230	
Total	Lucretia Regina-Potter	5,487	28.1
Write-in		0	0.0
Total votes		19,521	100.0
Democratic hold			

=== 2006 ===
2006 New York State Assembly election, District 49
Party	Candidate	Votes	%
Democratic	Peter Abbate Jr.	7,413	
Working Families	Peter Abbate Jr.	471	
Total	Peter Abbate Jr. (incumbent)	7,884	74.2
Republican	Lucretia Regina-Potter	2,373	
Conservative	Lucretia Regina-Potter	364	
Total	Lucretia Regina-Potter	2,737	25.8
Write-in		1	0.0
Total votes		10,622	100.0
Democratic hold			

=== 2004 ===
2004 New York State Assembly election, District 49
Party	Candidate	Votes	%
Democratic	Peter Abbate Jr.	13,487	
Independence	Peter Abbate Jr.	545	
Working Families	Peter Abbate Jr.	521	
Total	Peter Abbate Jr. (incumbent)	14,553	72.9
Republican	Fred Martorell	4,998	
Conservative	Fred Martorell	419	
Total	Fred Martorell	5,417	27.1
Write-in		1	0.0
Total votes		19,971	100.0
Democratic hold			

=== 2002 ===
2002 New York State Assembly election, District 49
Party	Candidate	Votes	%
Democratic	Peter Abbate Jr.	6,954	
Independence	Peter Abbate Jr.	649	
Total	Peter Abbate Jr. (incumbent)	7,603	93.4
Conservative	Cynthia Gallo	541	6.6
Write-in		0	0.0
Total votes		8,144	100.0
Democratic hold			

=== 2000 ===
2000 New York State Assembly election, District 49
Party	Candidate	Votes	%
Democratic	Peter Abbate Jr.	14,922	
Independence	Peter Abbate Jr.	783	
Total	Peter Abbate Jr. (incumbent)	15,705	75.1
Republican	Josephine Frediani	4,482	
Conservative	Josephine Frediani	444	
Right to Life	Josephine Frediani	143	
Working Families	Josephine Frediani	143	
Total	Josephine Frediani	5,212	24.9
Write-in		0	0.0
Total votes		20,917	100.0

=== Federal results in Assembly District 49 ===
Year	Office	Results
2024	President	Trump 59.0 – 39.1%
2024	Senate	Sapraicone 52.8 - 45.9%
2022	Senate	Pinion 54.3 – 45.6%
2020	President	Biden 56.6 – 42.0%
2018	Senate	Gillibrand 66.0 – 34.0%
2016	President	Clinton 58.6 – 38.9%
2016	Senate	Schumer 66.3 – 33.7%
2012	President	Obama 64.0 – 35.0%
2012	Senate	Gillibrand 73.4 – 24.8%
