= Ian Phillips (American politician) =

American politician

Member-elect of the New York State Assembly from the 126th district
- Assuming office January 2027
- Succeeding: John Lemondes Jr.

Personal details
- Party: Democratic
- Website: www.ianforcny.com

Ian Phillips is an American politician. He is the Democratic member-elect of the New York State Assembly from the 126th district. He unseated incumbent Republican John Lemondes Jr. He unsuccessfully contested for the seat in 2024. He is a former teacher and a union leader.
