= Jennifer Lunsford =

American politician (born 1982)

Member of the New York State Assembly from the 135th district
- Incumbent
- Assumed office January 6, 2021
- Preceded by: Mark Johns

Personal details
- Born: February 6, 1982 (age 44)
- Party: Democratic
- Education: Hartwick College (BA); Boston University School of Law (JD)
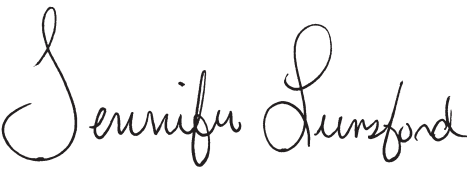
- Signature
- Website: Official website; Campaign Twitter

Jennifer Lunsford is an American Democratic Party politician, lawyer, and community volunteer who currently represents New York State Assembly district 135, which includes parts of Monroe County.

== Personal life ==
Lunsford was born on Long Island. Her mother was a secretary and sales manager, while her father was a stay-at-home dad. After graduating from Patchogue-Medford High School, she earned an undergraduate degree in political science and philosophy at Hartwick College. She worked as a paralegal before attending the Boston University School of Law, where she focused on health care law. She then moved to Rochester, New York, where she works as a litigator, primarily representing plaintiffs in personal injury, workers' compensation, and Social Security Disability Insurance.

Lunsford has worked as a community volunteer and activist, campaigning for reproductive justice, criminal justice, and universal health care with groups including If/When/How: Lawyering for Reproductive Justice.

== Politics ==
In 2018, Lunsford unsuccessfully ran for the 55th district seat in the New York State Senate, losing narrowly to Republican state senator Rich Funke. She campaigned again in 2020, but dropped out to run for the assembly.

Lunsford narrowly defeated incumbent Republican Mark Johns during the elections of 2020. In the close race, Johns held the lead before absentee and affidavit ballots were counted.

Lunsford co-sponsored legislation to outlaw use of tear gas and pepper spray on minors in February 2021, after an incident the previous month in which a suicidal 9-year-old girl was sprayed in the face.

Along with other Rochester area lawmakers, Lunsford supported an independent investigation of the Andrew Cuomo sexual harassment allegations that developed in February 2021.

In early March 2021, Lunsford was among a bipartisan group of legislators from the Rochester area to support revoking the emergency powers that Governor Andrew Cuomo had been granted in order to fight the COVID-19 pandemic, citing the progress that had been made up until that time and allegations that his administration had mishandled death numbers in the New York COVID-19 nursing home scandal.

On March 23, 2021, the assembly passed legislation expanding unemployment insurance eligibility to cover those who had to leave work due to child care obligations. Lunsford noted that the COVID-19 pandemic had worsened the child care situation in New York. Lunsford sponsored the bill, which clarified that child care constitutes good cause, a matter which had been decided inconsistently by courts and the unemployment insurance appeal board at the New York State Department of Labor.

New York State Assembly
Preceded by Mark C. Johns	New York State Assembly, 135th District; January 6, 2021 – present	Incumbent
