= Yuh-Line Niou =

American politician (born 1983)

- 牛毓琳
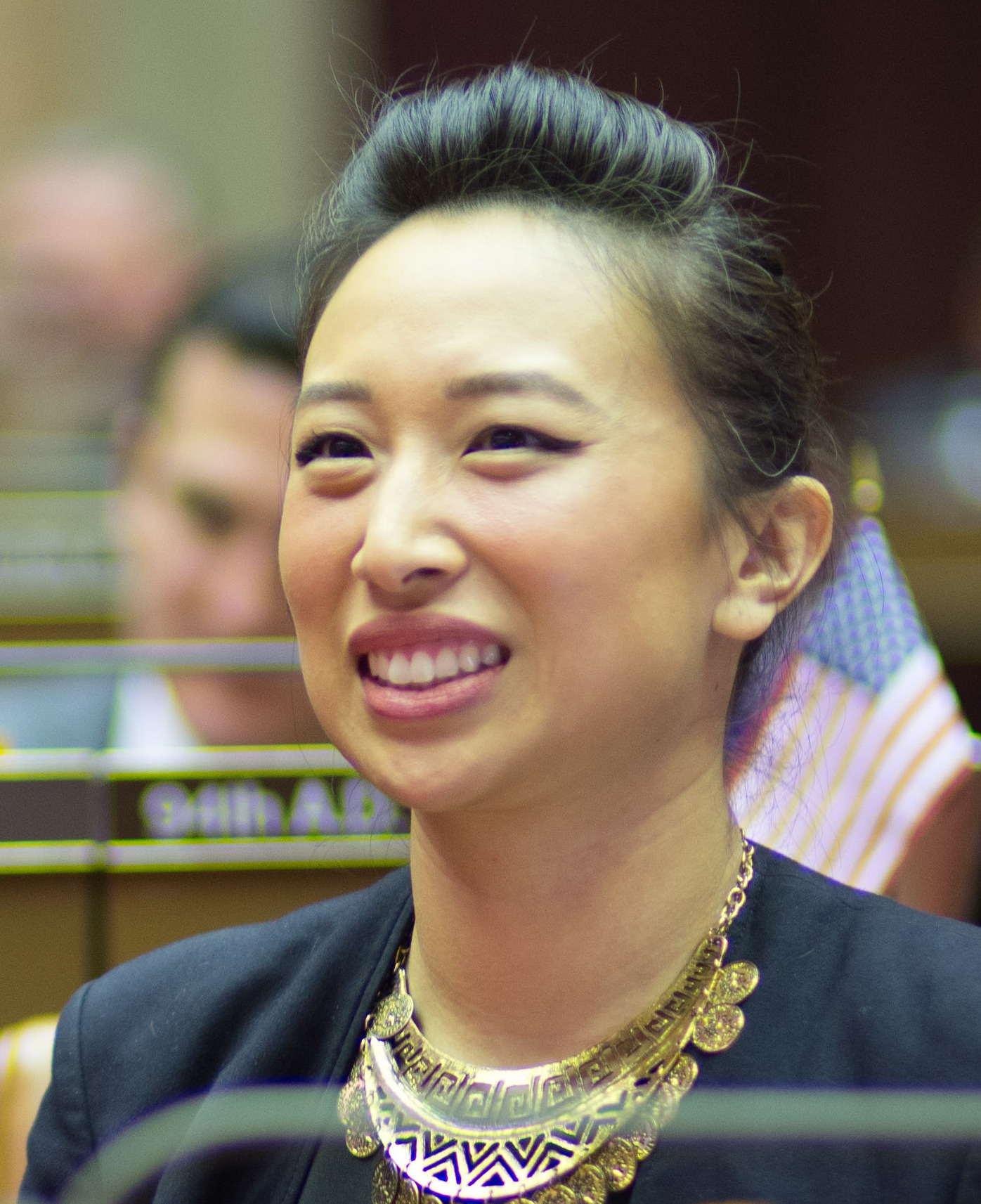
- Niou in 2017

Member of the New York State Assembly from the 65th district
- In office January 1, 2017 – December 31, 2022
- Preceded by: Alice Cancel
- Succeeded by: Grace Lee

Personal details
- Born: July 15, 1983 (age 43) Taipei, Taiwan
- Party: Democratic
- Education: Evergreen State College (BA); Baruch College (MPA)
- Website: New York State Assembly webpage (archived)

Yuh-Line Niou (/juliːn nioʊ/; Chinese: 牛毓琳; pinyin: Niú Yùlín; born July 15, 1983) is an American politician who served as a member of the New York State Assembly for the 65th district from 2017 to 2022. The Lower Manhattan district, which was heavily Democratic and over 40% Asian American, included Chinatown, the Financial District, Battery Park City, and the Lower East Side. Niou was the first Asian American elected to the State Assembly for the district. She was a candidate for Congress in New York's newly redrawn 10th congressional district in 2022. In February 2026, Niou announced she was running to succeed retiring New York State Senator Brian P. Kavanagh, whose term representing New York's 27th State Senate district in Lower Manhattan was due to expire at the end of the year. She was defeated in the June 2026 Democratic primary by Assemblymember Grace Lee 62 percent to 37 percent.

== Early life and education ==
Niou was born in Taipei, Taiwan, the eldest of three children, and emigrated to the U.S. with her parents when she was six months old. She went to school in El Paso, Texas.

Her mother worked as a registered nurse and hospital administrator while her father worked as a materials science engineer. They were both from Taoyuan, Taiwan. Her father received a Ph.D. in materials science and engineering from the Oregon Graduate Institute of Science & Technology and worked as a senior research scientist at the University of Texas at El Paso and senior engineer at WaferTech in Camas, Washington for over a decade. From 2001 to 2010, her father worked as a senior director at Semiconductor Manufacturing International Corporation (SMIC), a Chinese-state owned company, in Shanghai, China. Her mother also worked as an assistant director of environment, safety, and health at the company during this time.

She lived in Moscow, Idaho, and El Paso, Texas, before her parents settled in Vancouver, Washington. She attended and graduated from Columbia River High School.

Niou earned her Bachelor of Arts in social policy from Evergreen State College and worked as a legislative assistant to State Representative Eileen Cody and Senator Debbie Regala of the Washington State Legislature. She was diagnosed with autism at 22. She moved to New York City in 2010 to obtain a Master of Public Administration (MPA) from Baruch College, and served as chief of staff to Ron Kim, a member of the New York State Assembly. In a 2016 interview, Niou said that she first publicly discussed her autism diagnosis with a group of parents representing Autism Speaks, who visited Kim's office. Niou also worked as a lobbyist in Washington state.

== New York State Assembly ==
=== Elections ===
After a corruption scandal involving Sheldon Silver forced his resignation, a special election was held to fill the vacancy in April 2016. Alice Cancel, an ally of Silver and a local Democratic District leader, ran as the nominee of the Democratic Party, while Niou, with the encouragement of former State Senator Daniel Squadron, ran as the Working Families Party candidate. Cancel won the special election.

Niou ran for the seat again in the 2016 Democratic primary and won the Democratic nomination in September 2016. She then won the general election in November 2016 with 76% of the vote.

In 2018 Niou was uncontested in the primary and general elections. In 2020, Grace Lee ran against Niou in the Democratic primary, receiving 35.7% of the vote to Niou's 64%. Niou was uncontested in the 2020 general election.

=== Tenure ===
While serving in the New York State Assembly, Niou prioritized legislation related to consumer protection and tenants rights and advocated for increased funding for the New York City Housing Authority (NYCHA). She also worked to prevent a new housing and office building from being developed on community supported green space, the Elizabeth Street Garden. Eventually, the garden's nonprofit lost the battle to save the space, which had begun in 2012, prior to Niou's election.

In January 2019, during an assembly hearing regarding the Child Victims Act, Niou recounted her own sexual assault. The act passed in the state Assembly that day with a vote of 130–3. In the same year, she voted to ban the possession of firearms on school campuses with the exception of school's police officers and security guards, prohibit the manufacturing, sale, or ownership of untraceable 3D printed firearms, and establish a firearm buyback program in New York. All bills passed the State Assembly and State Senate and were signed into law by New York's governor Andrew Cuomo.

In 2022, she voted to expand legal protections for abortion providers in New York, prohibit arrests for lawful abortions, and prohibit extradition of abortion providers to other states. Both bills passed the State Assembly and State Senate and were signed into law by Governor Kathy Hochul in June 2022.

As a member of the State Assembly, Niou served as the Chair of the Subcommittee on Catastrophic Natural Disasters that focuses on combating climate change and building a safer New York when disaster strikes, and co-chair of the Asian Pacific American Task Force that focuses on fighting anti-Asian bigotry and hate crimes in the wake of the coronavirus pandemic.

== 2022 congressional candidacy ==
In December 2021, Niou stated her intention to issue a primary challenge against state Senator Brian P. Kavanagh of New York's 26th State Senate district. In May 2022, Niou announced she was instead running for Congress in New York's 10th congressional district. She was endorsed by the Working Families Party, Sunrise Movement NYC, New York Communities for Change, New York City Public Advocate Jumaane Williams, State Sen. Julia Salazar, State Assemblymember Ron Kim, Mayor of Boston Michelle Wu, former gubernatorial candidate Cynthia Nixon, former candidate for Manhattan District Attorney Tahanie Aboushi, and dozens of other elected officials, activists, and organizations.

Niou garnered about 1,300 fewer votes than Dan Goldman in the crowded Democratic primary from in-person ballots according to the Associated Press. She conceded the primary on September 6 after most of the remaining absentee ballots had been counted. She decided against a third-party challenge to Goldman using the Working Families Party ballot line in the general election, citing her priority of defending democracy in other competitive races and lack of resources needed to mount a serious challenge against the Democratic nominee. Goldman won the general election with 84% of the vote.

=== Post Assembly Activities ===
Niou worked with The Chinatown Defense Network Coalition. She also worked with Hands Off New York between the month when she left The New York State Assembly and announcing her run for the New York State Senate.

=== 2026 New York State Senate Primary ===
In January 2026, Niou decided to run for New York State Senate's 27th District; the district consists of the neighborhoods of Greenwich Village, the East Villiage, Tribeca, The Financial District, and neighborhoods in between. The seat is being vacated by New York State Senator Brian Kavanaugh in January 2027; Kavanaugh decided not to run for reelection in November 2026. New York State Assemblywoman Grace Lee was her only challenger in the Democratic Party Primary on June 23. This primary is the first election in New York county (or the borough of Manhattan) history where only 2 female candidates of East Asian ancestry ran for an open seat in the New York State Senate. Unlike the results of their last primary for the Assembly seat, Lee defeated Niou in this contest.

== Political positions ==
=== Abortion ===
Niou has a 100% rating from Planned Parenthood for her support of abortion rights. She has voted to expand legal protections for abortion providers in New York and prohibit extradition of abortion providers to other states. She said codifying abortion rights is one of her first priorities if she were to be elected to Congress in an interview with New York Magazine.

=== Criminal justice ===
In 2019, Niou voted in favor of a criminal justice reform bill that prohibits the use of cash bail for misdemeanors and non-violent felonies, requires both defendants and prosecutors to share all evidence in their possession in advance of trials, and mandates all misdemeanor and felony cases in the state of New York to be resolved within 90 and 180 days, respectively. It passed both the State Assembly and Senate and was signed into law by New York's governor Andrew Cuomo in April 2019. Under the reform, judges retain the ability to set bail in, for example, cases that involve a violent felony, a defendant who is charged while on probation, or are considered high-risk.

During a series of civil unrest triggered by the murder of George Floyd in 2020, Niou criticized the police for "escalating tensions or resorting to violence" and called for creating a culture of accountability and fairness within law enforcement. She supported efforts to defund the police in 2020, in order to redirect the funds toward social services, education, and housing.

=== Guns ===
Niou has a "F" rating from the NRA Political Victory Fund (NRA-PVF). She has voted to expand red flag laws, require license for possession of a semi-automatic firearm, prohibit the sale of privately made firearms, and authorize the State of New York to sue gun manufactures for damage caused by their guns. She is in favor of banning assault rifles and assault weapons.

=== Healthcare ===
Niou supports Medicare for All i.e a nationwide single-payer healthcare system and has been a supporter of the New York Health Act introduced by fellow assemblymember Richard N. Gottfried, which would establish a statewide single-payer health plan if passed.

In 2021, Niou co-introduced and cosponsored legislation to expand the practice of applied behavior analysis in New York State. It was signed into law on December 30, 2021 and took effect June 30, 2023.

=== Housing ===
In 2019, Niou supported a controversial lawsuit to stop a Habitat for Humanity affordable housing development for seniors in Elizabeth Street Garden in Little Italy. Niou has expressed doubts about proposals to allow for more dense housing, including affordable housing, in NoHo and SoHo.

Niou supports allocating 100% of residential units in the proposed 5 World Trade Center in Lower Manhattan as affordable housing.

=== Judiciary ===
Niou supports expanding the Supreme Court of the United States and implementing term limits on Justices. In the wake of the Dobbs decision that overturned Roe v. Wade, she again advocated for expanding the court, citing concern over further erosion of constitutional rights to privacy with respect to intimate practices as established by Griswold v. Connecticut.

=== Environment ===
Niou supports the Green New Deal. She has been endorsed by Sunrise Movement NYC for her campaign for New York's 10th congressional district in 2022.

=== Israel and Palestine ===
Niou has advocated for a negotiated solution to the Israeli–Palestinian conflict, stating that both Israelis and Palestinians deserve the right to live in safety and security. She supports providing Israel with defensive military assistance, as long as it is not used for human rights violations and is accompanied by appropriate oversight. She has also indicated that any American tax dollars sent overseas should be subject to "transparency" and must never facilitate harm to civilians.

In July 2022, Niou said, "I do support BDS," referring to the Boycott, Divestment and Sanctions movement against Israel. She clarified that she views BDS as a constitutionally protected form of protest rather than antisemitic, and opposes anti-BDS legislation on free speech grounds. She also said that she hasn't personally participated in any boycott of Israel, adding that she does not embrace all of BDS's tactics or demands. Her stance on BDS prompted state legislator Brian Cunningham to withdraw his endorsement of her campaign.

In April 2024, Niou expressed support for pro-Palestinian protestors at Columbia University, decrying the involvement of the NYPD by university administration and the removal of protestors from Columbia University grounds.

== Personal life ==
Niou is a cousin of Howard Wang, an American voice actor known for his roles in animated series and films. She is Christian and attends Redeemer Presbyterian Church. She is queer.

== See also ==
- List of Taiwanese Americans
- New York State Legislature
- Taiwanese Americans in New York City
