= ASI Government =

ASI Government, Inc.
- Type: Private
- Industry: Products and Government Consulting
- Founded: 1996
- Headquarters: Arlington, Virginia
- Key people: Timothy W. Cooke, President and CEO
- Products: VAO, ALO, TAP
- Website: www.asigovernment.com

ASI Government (ASI), formerly Acquisition Solutions, Inc., started out in 1996 as an acquisition consultant to the federal government, and was one of the recognized contributors to the US Government's Performance Based Acquisition (PBA) Seven Steps guide. ASI focuses on educating/guiding government acquisition personnel in contracting, regulatory compliance, and project performance measurement. The company currently claims expertise in government acquisition, program management, strategy and organizational performance, and mission support solutions to federal agencies including civilian, defense, homeland security, and the intelligence community."

ASI employs design thinking to evoke empathy, identify root causes and prototype solutions, and engage in government acquisition through its Virtual Acquisition Office, Applied Learning Online, and Tailored Acquisition Portal.

== History ==
- Founded in 1996 as Acquisition Solutions Inc. by former Federal acquisition professionals
- Developed Seven Steps to Performance Based Acquisition methodology in 2000, which is later adopted as government-wide guidance
- Acquired ICOR partners in 2010 for program management and IT capabilities
- Rebranded to ASI Government to reflect exclusive commitment to government clientele in September 2010
- Acquired Frontline Solutions Corporation, a provider of solutions to the Intelligence Community, in December 2011
