= Alice Cancel =

American politician

Member of the New York State Assembly from the 65th district
- In office May 10, 2016 – December 31, 2016
- Preceded by: Sheldon Silver
- Succeeded by: Yuh-Line Niou

Personal details
- Born: January 6, 1955 (age 71) Mayagüez, Puerto Rico
- Party: Democratic
- Spouse: John Quinn
- Children: 3
- Website: Official website

Alice Cancel is an American former politician from New York City who represented the 65th District of the New York State Assembly for several months in 2016. She is a Democrat. The district included the neighborhoods of the Lower East Side, East Village, Little Italy, Chinatown, SoHo, TriBeCa, the Financial District, Battery Park and Governor's Island in Manhattan. After winning an April 2016 special election to fill the vacancy created by the felony conviction of former Assembly Speaker Sheldon Silver, Cancel was defeated in a Democratic primary by Yuh-Line Niou later that year.

== Life and career ==
Born in Puerto Rico, Cancel was raised in the South Bronx and on the Lower East Side of Manhattan. She has long been active in Democratic politics, serving as a District Leader in her community for over twenty-five years. Prior to election to the Assembly, Cancel worked in the New York Senate as well as for New York City Comptroller Scott Stringer.

Cancel is married to John Quinn, who is a longtime labor leader in New York City.

== New York Assembly ==
Former Speaker Sheldon Silver was found guilty of corruption in 2015 and was forced to relinquish the seat he held in the New York Assembly for nearly forty years, opening up the seat for a special election. The Manhattan Democratic Party and local district leaders selected Cancel as the Democratic candidate in the April 19, 2016 special election to fill the seat formerly held by Silver.

In the election, Cancel faced Republican Lester Chang, Green Party candidate Dennis Levy and Working Families Party candidate Yuh-Line Niou, who had outraised Cancel overwhelmingly and was seen as a candidate who could make the race close. Cancel was out-spent 100 to one and her opponents received more political endorsements than Cancel did. In a closely watched race, Cancel ultimately won the election with 41% of the vote, besting Niou by 1,034 votes, with Chang and Levy together taking 23%.

Cancel was sworn into office on May 10, 2016. She ran again in the 2016 primary election to retain her seat for a full, two-year term but was defeated by Niou. Cancel remained a candidate in the general election on the Women's Equality Party Line, but lost again to Niou in the November 8 general election.

Political offices
| Preceded by Sheldon Silver | New York Assembly, 65th District; 2016 | Succeeded by Yuh-Line Niou |
