= Peter J. Abbate Jr. =

American politician (born 1949)

Peter Abbate Jr.
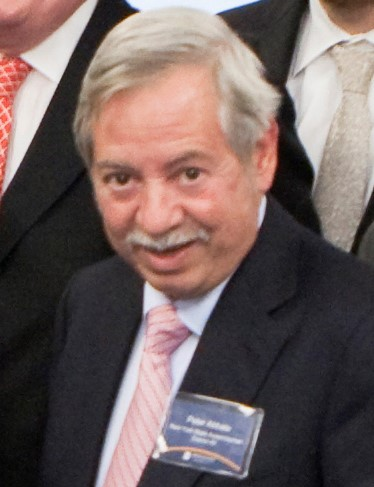
- Abbate in 2011

Member of the New York State Assembly from the 49th district
- In office January 1, 1987 – December 31, 2022
- Preceded by: Arnaldo Ferraro
- Succeeded by: Lester Chang

Personal details
- Born: March 22, 1949 (age 77) Brooklyn, New York, U.S.
- Party: Democratic
- Education: St. John's University (BS)
- Website: Official website

Peter J. Abbate Jr. (born March 22, 1949) is a former American politician who represented District 49 in the New York State Assembly.

Abbate graduated from St. John's University and Bishop Ford Central Catholic High School.

First elected to the assembly in 1986, Abbate is the chair of the Committee on Governmental Employees, a position he has held since 2002, previously served as the chairman of the Committee on Real Property Taxation and the Committee on Cities.

Prior to his election to the assembly, Abbate served as the district representative for former Congressman Stephen J. Solarz, from 1974 to 1985, and previously as his legislative assistant while Solarz was a member of the assembly, 1973.

In 2022, Abbate was confronted by a local resident for removing lawn signs supporting Lee Zeldin from the ground in Midwood. Abbate said that the signs were breaking the law. Abbate was defeated in 2022 by Lester Chang.

New York State Assembly
Preceded by Arnaldo Ferraro	New York State Assembly; 49th District; 1987–2022	Succeeded by Lester Chang
