= Gary Finch =

American politician (1944–2023)

Gary D. Finch

Member of the New York State Assembly from the 126th district
- In office November 3, 1999 – January 6, 2021
- Preceded by: Daniel Fessenden
- Succeeded by: John Lemondes Jr.

Personal details
- Born: March 13, 1944 Auburn, New York, U.S.
- Died: May 5, 2023 (aged 79)
- Party: Republican
- Children: 2
- Education: Empire State College (BS)
- Website: Official website

Gary D. Finch (March 13, 1944 – May 5, 2023) was an American politician who served as a member of the New York State Assembly from 1999 to 2021.

== Early life and education ==
Finch was born in Auburn, New York on March 13, 1944. He attended Cayuga Community College. Finch received a degree from the Simmons School of Mortuary Science in 1966. He also earned a Bachelor of Science degree in public administration and political theory from Empire State College (State University of New York) in 1989.

== Career ==
From 1970, Finch had owned and operated Brew-Finch Funeral Homes, Inc. a company which operates funeral homes in central New York State. Finch's first elected position was as a trustee for the Village of Aurora in 1979. He then was elected mayor of the village in 1982, a position he held for eight years.

Finch was first elected to the State Assembly on November 2, 1999. He won the November 2008 general election with 65 percent of the vote and ran uncontested in the November 2010 general election.

Finch served as assistant minority leader of the minority conference, and was assigned to the Assembly committees on Agriculture, Banks, Corrections, Insurance and Rules.

== Personal life and death ==
Finch lived in the town of Springport with his wife, Marcia Herrling Finch and their two children, Amy and Gregory.

Finch died on May 5, 2023, at the age of 79.

New York State Assembly
Preceded by Daniel J. Fessenden	New York State Assembly, 126th District; 1999–2002	Succeeded by Robert J. Warner
Preceded by Jay J. Dinga	New York State Assembly, 123rd District; 2003–2021	Incumbent
