= Mark C. Johns =

American politician

Mark Johns
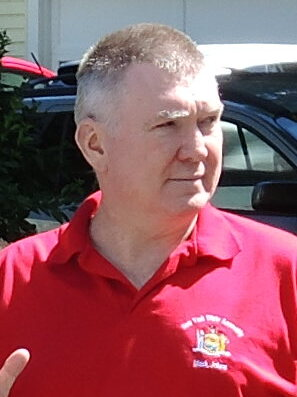
- Johns in 2014

Monroe County Legislator District 8
- Incumbent
- Assumed office April 13, 2022
- Preceded by: Matthew Terp

New York State Assembly District 135
- In office January 1, 2011 – December 31, 2020
- Preceded by: David R. Koon
- Succeeded by: Jennifer Lunsford

Personal details
- Born: October 29, 1952 (age 73) Rochester, New York, U.S.
- Party: Republican
- Education: St. John Fisher College
- Profession: Environmental health specialist, Politician

Mark C. Johns (born October 29, 1952) is an American politician who represents District 8 in the Monroe County Legislature. He formerly represented District 135 in the New York State Assembly, which includes the towns and villages of East Rochester, Penfield and Webster, and Fairport, in the eastern suburbs of Rochester. He is a member of the Republican Party.

Johns is a lifetime resident of Webster, where he attended Catholic and public schools. He became an Eagle Scout at the age of 14. He graduated from St. John Fisher College in 1975, with a B.S. degree in biology. He joined the Monroe County Health Department in 1979, where worked as an environmental health specialist until he retired in 2012.

His first foray into politics was a run against congresswoman Louise Slaughter for New York's 28th congressional district in 2000. He was elected to the Webster Town Board in 2007, where he served a four-year term before being elected to the state Assembly. Johns also served on the Webster Conservation Board.

Johns also ran unsuccessfully against state assemblyman David Koon in 2004 and 2006 before winning the assembly seat in 2010 by a slim margin.

Johns was narrowly defeated by Democrat Jen Lunsford in the 2020 elections.

On April 13, 2022, he was appointed to fill a vacancy in the 8th District of the Monroe County Legislature after the resignation of Matthew Terp.

New York State Assembly
Preceded by David R. Koon	New York State Assembly, 135th District; January 1, 2011 – December 31, 2020	Succeeded by Jennifer Lunsford
