= Sheldon Silver =

American politician (1944–2022)

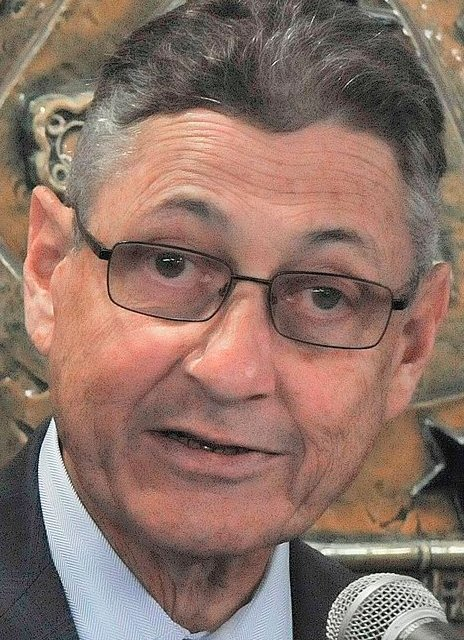
- Silver in 2011

119th Speaker of the New York State Assembly
- In office February 11, 1994 – February 2, 2015
- Governor: Mario Cuomo; George Pataki; Eliot Spitzer; David Paterson; Andrew Cuomo
- Preceded by: Saul Weprin
- Succeeded by: Carl Heastie

Member of the New York State Assembly
- In office January 1, 1977 – November 30, 2015
- Preceded by: Anthony G. DiFalco
- Succeeded by: Alice Cancel
- Constituency: 63rd district (1977–1982); 62nd district (1983–2002); 64th district (2003–2012); 65th district (2012–2015)

Personal details
- Born: February 13, 1944 Manhattan, New York, U.S.
- Died: January 24, 2022 (aged 77) Ayer, Massachusetts, U.S.
- Party: Democratic
- Spouse: Rosa Mandelkern
- Education: Yeshiva University (BA); Brooklyn Law School (JD)
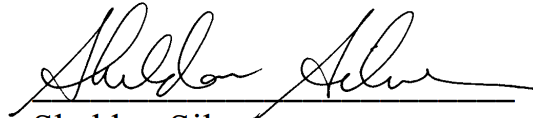
- Signature
- Website: Archived Assembly website

Sheldon Silver (February 13, 1944 – January 24, 2022) was an American Democratic Party politician, attorney, and convicted felon from New York City who served as Speaker of the New York State Assembly from 1994 to 2015. A native of Manhattan's Lower East Side, Silver served in the New York State Assembly from 1977 to 2015. In 1994, he was elected as Speaker; he held that position for two decades. During this period, Silver was known as one of the most powerful politicians in the state.

Silver was arrested on federal corruption charges in early 2015, and resigned as Speaker of the Assembly shortly afterward. At his trial that November, he was convicted of all charges; the felony convictions triggered his automatic expulsion from the Assembly. Silver's conviction was overturned on appeal, but in May 2018, following a retrial, he was found guilty on the same charges. After another appeal, the Second Circuit Court of Appeals dismissed the guilty verdicts for three of the charges but upheld them for four others. Silver was resentenced in July 2020 to 6 1/2 years in prison and a $1 million fine. He was released on May 4, 2021 under a provision of the CARES Act, which allows prison bureaus to release those deemed vulnerable to COVID-19, but was recalled to a medical-care specialized federal prison two days later. He died at a hospital in Ayer, Massachusetts on January 24, 2022, while still serving his sentence.

== Early life ==
An Orthodox Jew whose parents were Russian immigrants, Silver was a native of Manhattan's Lower East Side. He graduated from the Rabbi Jacob Joseph High School on Henry Street, where he was captain of the basketball team. Silver graduated from Yeshiva University with a Bachelor of Arts degree in 1965, and earned his Juris Doctor from Brooklyn Law School in 1968.

== Law career ==
Silver practiced law with the firm of Schecter and Schwartz from 1968 until 1971, and then served as law secretary for New York City Civil Court Judge Francis N. Pecora from 1971 to 1976. In addition to Silver's duties in the New York State Assembly from 1977 to 2015, he was "of counsel" at Weitz & Luxenberg, one of New York State's largest personal injury litigation firms.

For years, Weitz & Luxenberg insisted that Silver's ties with the firm were negligible. In 2007, the New York Post charged that Silver's refusal to disclose the terms of his employment or the income he received raised suspicions of a conflict of interest. The income Silver received from Weitz & Luxenberg and the manner in which Silver obtained it ultimately led to his 2015 arrest on federal corruption charges.

== Political career ==
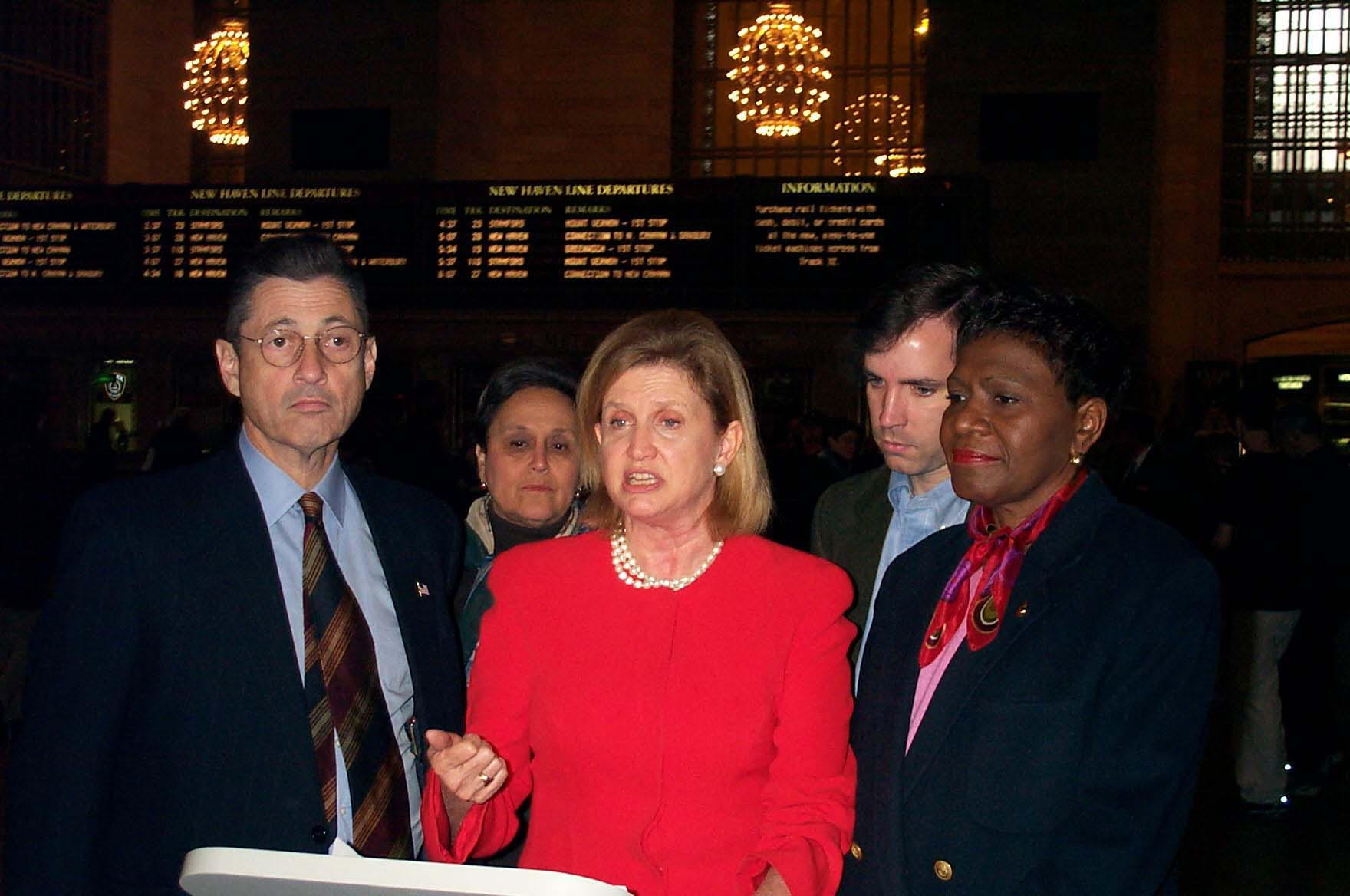
Silver, Carolyn Maloney, and C. Virginia Fields announce federal funds for construction of the Second Avenue subway, December 2001

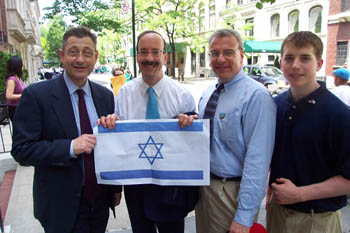
Silver, Eliot Engel, and Jeffrey Dinowitz at the Israel Day Parade in New York, May 2004

=== Elections ===
Silver was first elected to the Assembly in 1976. Silver advanced to the chairmanship of the Assembly Ways and Means Committee in 1991 and became speaker of the Assembly in 1994.

During the election years of his speakership, 1994–2014, Silver's district typically re-elected him with 80 to 90 percent of the vote. In 2008, he had his first Democratic primary challenge in over two decades, winning 69 percent, or 7,037 votes, to defeat his challengers, Paul Newell, who earned 22 percent (2,401 votes), and Luke Henry with 9 percent (891). Silver was re-elected on November 4 with 27,632 votes. His Republican challenger, Danniel Maio, received 7,387 votes.

=== Speaker of New York State Assembly ===
On February 11, 1994, after Saul Weprin died from a stroke, Silver became the speaker of the New York State Assembly. Silver served as Assembly Speaker until November 30, 2015.

==== Death penalty ====
As Speaker, Silver was instrumental in the reinstatement of the death penalty in New York State in 1995. New York's death penalty law was eventually ruled unconstitutional by the New York Court of Appeals in People v. LaValle (2004). The law provided that juries in capital cases would be instructed that if they deadlocked between sentencing a defendant to life imprisonment without parole and sentencing a defendant to death, the judge would sentence the defendant to life imprisonment with parole eligibility after 20 to 25 years. The Court found this provision unconstitutional, reasoning that this instruction would make execution seem preferable to juries because they would wish to avoid a defendant's potential future release on parole. Although no executions were carried out under the 1995 law, New York's crime rate dropped significantly in the decade since the law was passed. Silver let the law expire without much debate.

In December 2005, after two New York City police officers were killed in as many months, Governor George Pataki called for reinstatement of the death penalty. The New York Times quoted Silver's spokesman Charles Carrier as saying, "He no longer supports it because Assembly hearings have shown it is not the most effective way to improve public safety."

==== Affordable housing ====
In 1997 and throughout his Assembly career, Silver was a key advocate of state-administered rent regulation of New York apartments. This complex and highly politicized system made the Speaker a central figure, continually courted by major participants in the real-estate industry.

In 1967, New York City leveled the 20-acre (80,000 m^{2}) Seward Park Urban Renewal Area in Silver's neighborhood, and removed more than 1,800 low-income largely Hispanic families, with a promise that they could return to new low-income apartments when they were built. However, the site was kept undeveloped for decades afterward, as Silver and key allies, for example, the Metropolitan Council on Jewish Poverty strove to maintain the area's Jewish identity and opposed affordable housing, which would have brought more Hispanic and Chinese American residents. Finally in 2012, the site was approved for the Essex Crossing mixed-use development project. Construction is scheduled to be completed in 2024, some 57 years after the site was cleared.

==== Commuter tax ====
In 1999, Silver was instrumental in the repeal of New York City's commuter tax on non-resident earners. The repeal was a benefit to those commuting to work in the city from surrounding areas, but came at a substantial cost to New York City residents. Silver was criticized by city leaders for removing the tax, and although he suggested he would support reinstating it after the terrorist attacks of September 11, 2001, he took no steps to do so.

==== Attempted "coup" and criticism ====
In 2000, Silver faced an attempted "coup" in the Assembly as members, primarily from Upstate New York and dissatisfied with his leadership style, tried to overthrow him as Speaker. Michael Bragman, the leader of the backlash, lost his position as majority leader. An editorial in The Buffalo News, written in response, criticized Silver for having too much power:

The problem—which also exists in the State Senate—can be boiled down to a single overarching issue: The Assembly speaker has too much power. He controls everything, from the legislation that can be voted on to how his normally docile members vote on it. He decides what the Assembly will accept in a state budget. He negotiates secretly with the other two leaders to hammer out important, expensive and far-reaching laws. And he ignores the wishes of less-exalted lawmakers.

==== New York congestion tolls ====
In July 2007, Silver was skeptical about New York City Mayor Michael Bloomberg's New York congestion pricing program. When a meeting of the Democratic Assembly Conference indicated the proposal lacked sufficient support, Silver declined to schedule a vote on the measure, and it died. Although he stated that he "probably would have voted for the bill," a majority of his conference opposed the proposed plan.

==== Mixed martial arts ====
Silver, in his role as Speaker, was widely blamed for the delay in passing legislation allowing professional mixed martial arts in New York State. New York became the last of the 50 states to allow the sport in early 2016, after Silver had been expelled from the Assembly.

==== Failure to investigate sexual harassment ====
A former top aide to Silver, chief counsel J. Michael Boxley, was accused of raping two legislative aides while he was working for the Speaker, and Boxley eventually pleaded guilty to sexual misconduct. Silver was sued for failing to investigate the accusations properly and for tolerating a culture of sexual harassment in the Assembly. In 2006, Silver and the Assembly leadership agreed to pay $500,000 to settle the lawsuit. Similar settlements in 2012 and 2015 resulted from multiple harassment charges against former Assemblyman Vito Lopez, and Silver was accused of not acting forcefully to prevent Lopez's behavior. Silver apologized for not reporting cases to the Assembly's Ethics Committee as required, and said that since then he "put in place new policies to ensure these incidents are dealt with swiftly and transparently."

== Criminal proceedings ==
On January 7, 2015, Silver was re-elected Speaker of the New York State Assembly for the 11th time, with almost unanimous support from the Democratic majority despite an ongoing federal probe into his outside income.

Two weeks later, on January 22, Silver was arrested on federal corruption charges resulting from that probe. He was charged with extortion, wire fraud, and mail fraud. The federal inquiry, which followed the state's abrupt disbandment of its Moreland Commission to Investigate Public Corruption, focused on large payments that Silver received for years from Goldberg & Iryami, a law firm that specialized in seeking reductions of New York City real estate taxes for real estate developers. Silver was alleged to have persuaded developers who had business with the state to use the firm, which in turn generated $700,000 in referral fees to Silver. Investigators led by U.S. Attorney for the Southern District of New York Preet Bharara charged that Silver did not properly disclose the payments from the firm on his annual financial disclosure filings with the state. Goldberg & Iryami's major client was the state's single-largest political donor. One of the firm's founding partners, Jay Goldberg, was Silver's former Assembly counsel. Goldberg's partner at the firm, Dara Iryami, agreed to testify under immunity.

Similar charges were also filed involving millions of dollars in referral fees that Silver received from the law firm Weitz & Luxenberg. In this scheme, Silver was alleged to have directed about $500,000 in state grants to Dr. Robert Taub, a researcher in diseases caused by asbestos and the director of the Columbia University Mesothelioma Center. Taub then referred asbestos claimants to Weitz & Luxenberg, which paid Silver $1.4 million in salary and another $3.9 million in referral fees, although he did no work for them. After the charges were announced, Weitz & Luxenberg promptly placed Silver on leave. Both Taub and another of Silver's longtime associates, Brian Meara, provided key information to investigators in exchange for non-prosecution agreements.

On January 30, after a week of intense political pressure and dwindling support, Silver submitted his resignation as Speaker, effective February 2, while retaining his seat as a member of the Assembly and vowing to fight the charges against him. On February 3, the Assembly elected Carl Heastie as their new Speaker.

On April 25, 2015, Silver was indicted on additional charges of making illegal investments through private vehicles, netting a profit of $750,000. He pleaded not guilty to those charges three days later, on April 28.

=== Trial ===
Silver's trial on seven corruption charges lasted for much of November 2015. On November 30, 2015, a unanimous jury found Silver guilty on all seven counts, triggering his automatic expulsion from the Assembly. The New York Supreme Court, Appellate Division, which handles judicial and attorney misconduct, affirmed his automatic disbarment for the felony convictions.

On May 3, 2016, federal judge Valerie E. Caproni of the United States District Court for the Southern District of New York, who presided over the trial, sentenced Silver to 12 years in prison, and ordered him to pay $5.3 million in ill-gotten gains and $1.75 million in additional fines. Silver received two prison terms: 12 years for six criminal counts against him and 10 years on the seventh, to run concurrently.

=== Appeal ===
After the conviction, Silver remained free on bail as a panel of judges considered his appeal based on the U.S. Supreme Court's decision in McDonnell v. United States that reversed the corruption conviction of former Virginia Governor Bob McDonnell.

The Supreme Court decision in the McDonnell case narrowed the kinds of activities that could constitute corruption, and Silver's conviction was overturned by the United States Court of Appeals for the Second Circuit in Manhattan on July 13, 2017.

=== Second trial, conviction, appeal, and resentencing ===
After his conviction was overturned, Silver was retried on the same charges. On May 11, 2018, he was again found guilty on all counts. On July 27, 2018, Judge Caproni sentenced him to seven years in prison, five years less than the sentence she gave him for his first conviction, citing his advancing age.

Silver was due to report to prison on October 5, 2018, but this was stayed as he again appealed his conviction to the United States Court of Appeals for the Second Circuit. While his case was under continued appeal, he remained free on $200,000 bail.

On January 21, 2020, the panel unanimously dismissed the three charges stemming from Silver's involvement in the asbestos exposure cases but upheld the four charges related to the kickbacks from Goldberg & Iryami and money laundering, sending the case back to Judge Caproni for resentencing. Silver was resentenced by Judge Caproni on July 20, this time to 6 1/2 years in prison and a fine of $1 million. He reported to federal prison at Otisville, New York, on August 26, 2020. After being furloughed briefly, Silver was transferred to Federal Medical Center, Devens in May 2021.

=== Assessments ===
A number of commentators reflected on Silver's political career in the aftermath of his criminal convictions. Sara Foss, writing for the Daily Gazette, said that during his speakership, "he wielded an enormous amount of power, while also using his office for personal gain." She attributed to Silver an "opaque and autocratic style of governance". Joseph Spector and Jon Campbell in the Observer Dispatch said that, "for more than two decades" Silver "was one of the most powerful and feared politicians in New York". In 2018, Daniel Leddy of the Staten Island Advance wrote "As speaker of the New York State Assembly, Sheldon Silver was corruption personified, an iron-fisted dictator who turned that legislative body into his own personal, profit-making enterprise. The full extent of Silver's sleaziness will never be known, nor will the identity of those irreparably harmed by it".

== Personal life and death ==
Silver and his wife Rosa, a former special needs schoolteacher, had four children. According to court papers unsealed during the sentencing phase of his first trial, Silver was alleged to have had two extramarital affairs, both of which were connected to his Albany position. Both Silver and the two women who were the subject of the allegations have denied the affairs.

By the time he became Speaker of the Assembly, he was known to play basketball with other high-ranking officials, including former Governor Mario Cuomo and former New York State Comptroller Alan G. Hevesi.

Two weeks after Silver's first criminal conviction, his son-in-law Marcello Trebitsch was sentenced to prison for a separate multimillion-dollar crime, also prosecuted by Bharara's office.

At the time of his death, Silver was imprisoned at the Devens Federal Medical Center in Devens, Massachusetts. He died at Nashoba Valley Medical Center in nearby Ayer, Massachusetts, on January 24, 2022, less than a month before his 78th birthday.

== See also ==
- List of members of the New York State Assembly

New York State Assembly
Preceded by Anthony G. DiFalco	Member of the New York State Assembly from the 63rd district 1977–1982	Succeeded by Steven Sanders
Preceded by Paul M. Viggiano	Member of the New York State Assembly from the 62nd district 1983–2002	Succeeded by Robert Straniere
Preceded by Richard N. Gottfried	Member of the New York State Assembly from the 64th district 2003–2012	Succeeded by Nicole Malliotakis
Preceded by Micah Kellner	Member of the New York State Assembly from the 65th district 2013–2015	Succeeded by Alice Cancel
Preceded by Saul Weprin	New York State Assembly; Chairman of the Committee on Ways and Means; 1991–1994	Succeeded by Herman D. Farrell Jr.
Political offices
Preceded by Saul Weprin	Speaker of the New York State Assembly; 1994–2015	Succeeded by Carl Heastie
