= 2022 New York State Assembly election =

2022 New York Assembly election
- November 8, 2022

All 150 seats in the New York State Assembly 76 seats needed for a majority
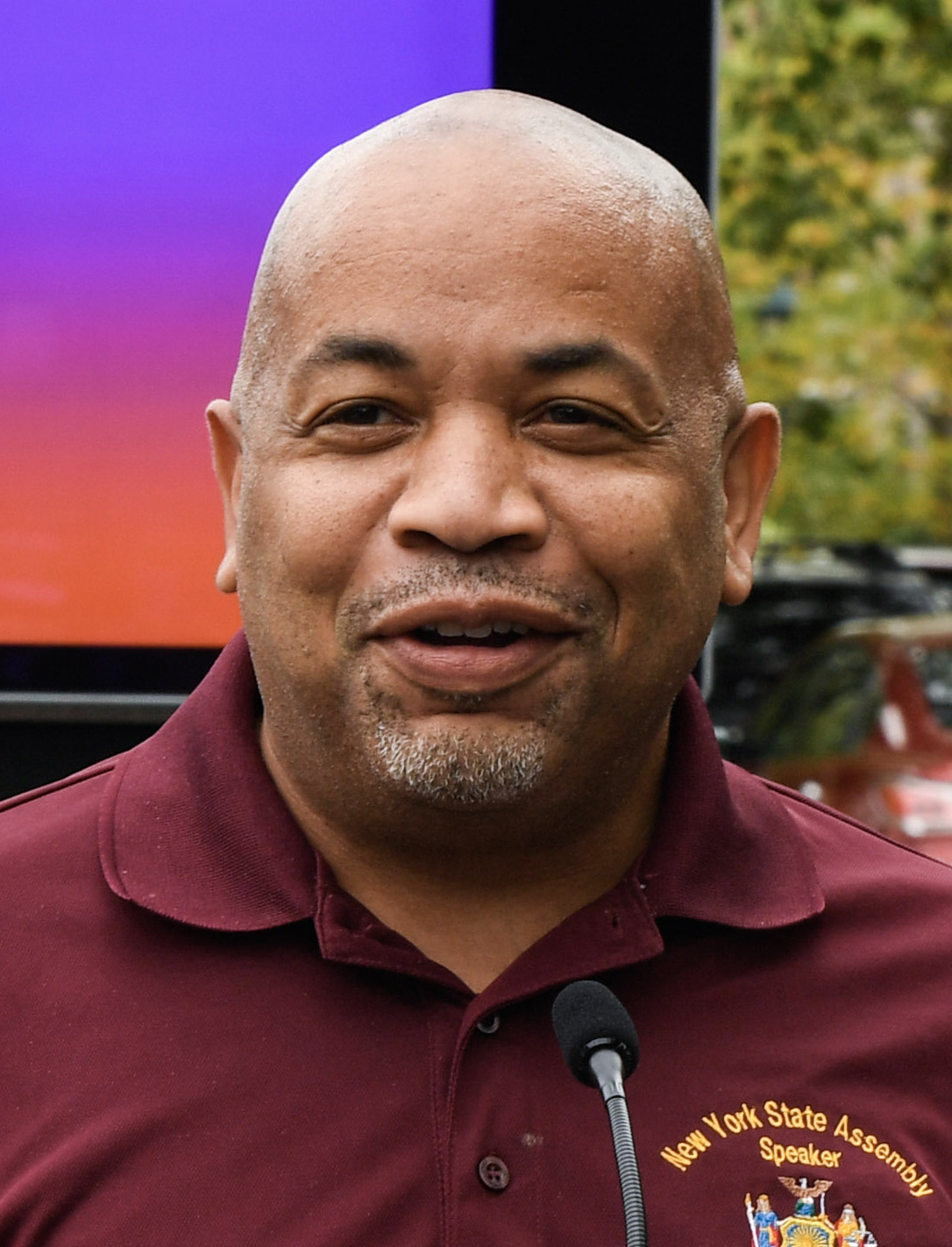

	Majority party	Minority party
Leader	Carl Heastie	William Barclay
Party	Democratic	Republican
Leader since	February 3, 2015	January 7, 2020
Leader's seat	83rd	120th
Last election	105 seats, 58.5%	43 seats, 31.7%
Seats before	107	43
Seats after	102	48
Seat change	▼3	▲5
Popular vote	2,729,459	2,136,277
Percentage	50.76%	39.73%
Swing	▼7.76%	▲8.01%
- Democratic gain Republican gain Democratic hold Republican hold 40–50% 50–60% 60–70% 70–80% 80–90% >90% 50–60% 60–70% 70–80% >90%
Speaker before election
Carl Heastie
Democratic
Speaker
Carl Heastie
Democratic

The 2022 New York State Assembly election was held on November 8, 2022. Elections were held to elect representatives from all 150 districts across the State of New York. This election coincided with New York elections for the governorship, U.S. Senate, and state senate, among others. Districts for this election were redrawn following the 2020 United States census. Democrats had held a majority in the New York State Assembly since 1975.

== Predictions ==
Source	Ranking	As of
Sabato's Crystal Ball	Safe D	May 19, 2022

== Overview ==
=== Incumbents not seeking re-election ===
- Michael Montesano (R) retired.
- Brian Barnwell (D) retired.
- Catherine Nolan (D) retired.
- Michael Cusick (D) retired.
- Yuh-Line Niou (D) ran for the U.S. House of Representatives in newly redrawn 10th congressional district.
- Dan Quart (D) ran for Manhattan's 9th Municipal Court District.
- Richard Gottfried (D) retired.
- Kevin Byrne (R) ran for Putnam County Executive.
- Sandra Galef (D) retired.
- Mike Lawler (R) ran for the United States House of Representatives.
- Colin Schmitt (R) ran for the United States House of Representatives.
- Kieran Michael Lalor (R) retired.
- Jake Ashby (R) ran for State Senate.
- Mark Walczyk (R) ran for State Senate.
- John Salka (R) retired.

=== Incumbents defeated in primary elections ===
- Jose Rivera (D) lost renomination to George Alvarez in District 78.
- Tom Abinanti (D) lost renomination to MaryJane Shimsky in District 92.
- Kevin Cahill (D) lost renomination to Sarahana Shrestha in District 103.

=== Election ===
2022 New York State Assembly election General election — November 8, 2022
New York State Assembly 2022
Party	Votes	Percentage	Seats	+/–
Democratic	2,729,459	50.76	102	▼5
Republican	2,136,277	39.73	48	▲5
Conservative	320,163	5.95	0	Steady
Working Families	170,246	3.17	0	Steady
Others (Note: Combined votes totals of minor parties that have one or two candidates: Independence Party (1,604 Votes); We the People Party (775 Votes); Integrity Party (776 Votes); Broadband Now Party (680 Votes); Art and Culture Party (450 Votes); Medical Freedom Party (448 Votes); Rent Is Too Damn High Party (430 Votes); Fair Deal Party (294 Votes))	4,647	0.09	0	▼1 (Note: Fred Thiele of the 1st Assembly District switch to the Democratic Party after the Independence Party lost ballot access.)
Independents	830	0.02	0	Steady
Scattering	15,233	0.28	0	Steady
Valid votes	5,376,855	90.24	150	—
Blank votes	572,399	9.61	—	—
Void votes	9,376	0.16	—	—
Totals	5,958.630	100	150	—

=== Summary by Assembly Districts ===
District	2016/2020 pres. result	Member	Party	First elected	Status	Candidates
1	D+4	Fred Thiele	Dem	1995	Incumbent re-elected.	Peter Ganley (Republican) Fred Thiele (Democrat)
2	R+8	Jodi Giglio	Rep	2020	Incumbent re-elected.	Jodi Giglio (Republican) Wendy Hamberger (Democratic)
3	R+4	Joe DeStefano	Rep	2018	Incumbent re-elected.	Joe DeStefano (Republican) Trina Miles (Democratic)
4	D+1	Steve Englebright	Dem	1992+	Incumbent lost re-election. New member elected. Republican gain.	Steve Englebright (Democratic) Edward Flood (Republican)
5	R+8	Douglas M. Smith	Rep	2018+	Incumbent re-elected.	James Anthony (Democratic) Douglas Smith (Republican)
6	D+20	Philip Ramos	Dem	2002	Incumbent re-elected.	Philip Ramos (Democratic) Kevin Surdi (Republican)
7	R+6	Jarett Gandolfo	Rep	2020	Incumbent re-elected.	Jarett Gandolfo (Republican) Douglas Pearsall (Democratic)
8	R+19	Michael J. Fitzpatrick	Rep	2002	Incumbent re-elected.	Michael Fitzpatrick (Republican) Jeanine Aponte (Democratic)
9	R+19	Michael Durso	Rep	2020	Incumbent re-elected.	Michael Durso (Republican) Steven J. Dellavecchia (Democratic)
10	D+5	Steve Stern	Dem	2018+	Incumbent re-elected.	Steve Stern (Democrat) Aamir Sultan (Republican)
11	D+6	Kimberly Jean-Pierre	Dem	2014	Incumbent re-elected.	Kimberly Jean-Pierre (Democrat) Christopher Sperber (Republican)
12	R+2	Keith Brown	Rep	2020+	Incumbent re-elected.	Keith Brown (Republican) Cooper Macco (Democratic)
13	D+9	Charles D. Lavine	Dem	2004	Incumbent re-elected.	Charles D. Lavine (Democrat) Ruka Anzai (Republican)
14	R+8	David McDonough	Rep	2002+	Incumbent re-elected.	David McDonough (Republican) Dustin Ginsberg (Democratic)
15	R+2	Michael Montesano	Rep	2010+	Incumbent retired. New member elected. Republican hold.	Jacob Ryan Blumencranz (Republican) Amanda R. Field (Democratic)
16	D+7	Gina Sillitti	Dem	2020	Incumbent re-elected.	Gina Sillitti (Democratic) Vibhuti Jha (Republican)
17	R+10	John Mikulin	Rep	2018+	Incumbent re-elected.	John Mikulin (Republican) Paul R. Kaminsky (Democratic)
18	D+39	Taylor Darling	Dem	2018	Incumbent re-elected.	Taylor Darling (Democrat) LaMont Johnson (Republican)
19	R+6	Ed Ra	Rep	2010	Incumbent re-elected.	Ed Ra (Republican) Sanjeev Kumar Jindal (Democrat)
20	R+4	Eric Brown	Rep	2022+	Incumbent re-elected.	Eric Brown (Republican) Michael A. Delury (Democrat)
21	D+6	Judy Griffin	Dem	2018	Incumbent lost re-election. New member elected. Republican gain.	Judy Griffin (Democrat) Brian F. Curran (Republican)
22	D+15	Michaelle C. Solages	Dem	2012	Incumbent re-elected.	Michaelle C. Solages (Democrat) Cara Castronuova (Republican)
23	D+2	Stacey Pheffer Amato	Dem	2016	Incumbent re-elected.	Stacey Pheffer Amato (Democrat) Thomas Sullivan (Republican)
24	D+25	David Weprin	Dem	2010+	Incumbent re-elected.	David Weprin (Democrat)
25	D+14	Nily Rozic	Dem	2012	Incumbent re-elected.	Nily Rozic (Democrat) Seth Breland (Republican)
26	D+10	Edward Braunstein	Dem	2010	Incumbent re-elected.	Edward Braunstein (Democrat) Robert Speranza (Republican)
27	D+8	Daniel Rosenthal	Dem	2017+	Incumbent re-elected.	Daniel Rosenthal (Democrat) Angelo King (Republican)
28	D+12	Andrew Hevesi	Dem	2005+	Incumbent re-elected.	Andrew Hevesi (Democrat) Michael Conigliaro (Republican)
29	D+42	Alicia Hyndman	Dem	2015+	Incumbent re-elected.	Alicia Hyndman (Democrat)
30	D+19	Brian Barnwell	Dem	2016	Incumbent retired. New member elected. Democratic hold.	Steven Raga (Democrat) Sean Lally (Republican)
31	D+39	Khaleel Anderson	Dem	2020	Incumbent re-elected.	Khaleel Anderson (Democrat)
32	D+43	Vivian E. Cook	Dem	1990	Incumbent re-elected.	Vivian E. Cook (Democrat) Marilyn Miller (Republican)
33	D+37	Clyde Vanel	Dem	2016+	Incumbent re-elected.	Clyde Vanel (Democrat)
34	D+26	Jessica González-Rojas	Dem	2020	Incumbent re-elected.	Jessica González-Rojas (Democrat)
35	D+26	Jeffrion L. Aubry	Dem	1992+	Incumbent re-elected.	Jeffrion L. Aubry (Democrat) Hiram Monserrate (Democrat)
36	D+32	Zohran Mamdani	Dem	2020	Incumbent re-elected.	Zohran Mamdani (Democrat)
37	D+26	Catherine Nolan	Dem	1984	Incumbent retired. New member elected. Democratic hold.	Juan Ardila (Democrat)
38	D+23	Jenifer Rajkumar	Dem	2020	Incumbent re-elected.	Jenifer Rajkumar (Democrat)
39	D+24	Catalina Cruz	Dem	2018	Incumbent re-elected.	Catalina Cruz (Democrat)
40	D+14	Ron Kim	Dem	2012	Incumbent re-elected.	Ron Kim (Democrat) Sharon Liao (Republican)
41	D+6	Helene Weinstein	Dem	1980	Incumbent re-elected.	Helene Weinstein (Democrat) Ramona Johnson (Conservative)
42	D+37	Rodneyse Bichotte	Dem	2014	Incumbent re-elected.	Rodneyse Bichotte (Democrat)
43	D+39	Brian Cunningham	Dem	2022+	Incumbent re-elected.	Brian Cunningham (Democrat) Jelanie Deshong (Working Families)
44	D+35	Robert Carroll	Dem	2016	Incumbent re-elected.	Robert Carroll (Democrat) Brenda Horton (Republican)
45	R+16	Steven Cymbrowitz	Dem	2000	Incumbent lost re-election. New member elected. Republican gain.	Steven Cymbrowitz (Democrat) Michael Novakhov (Republican)
46	D+2	Mathylde Frontus	Dem	2018	Incumbent lost re-election. New member elected. Republican gain.	Alec Brook-Krasny (Republican) Mathylde Frontus (Democrat)
47	D+2	William Colton	Dem	1996	Incumbent re-elected.	William Colton (Democrat) Dmitriy Kugel (Republican)
48	R+26	Simcha Eichenstein	Dem	2018	Incumbent re-elected.	Simcha Eichenstein (Democrat) Linda Holmes (Working Families)
49	D+5	Peter J. Abbate Jr.	Dem	1986	Incumbent lost re-election. New member elected. Republican gain.	Peter J. Abbate Jr. (Democrat) Lester Chang (Republican)
50	D+29	Emily Gallagher	Dem	2020	Incumbent re-elected.	Emily Gallagher (Democrat)
51	D+33	Marcela Mitaynes	Dem	2020	Incumbent re-elected.	Marcela Mitaynes (Democrat) Timothy Peterson (Republican)
52	D+42	Jo Anne Simon	Dem	2014	Incumbent re-elected.	Jo Anne Simon (Democrat) Brett Wynkoop (Republican)
53	D+40	Maritza Davila	Dem	2013+	Incumbent re-elected.	Maritza Davila (Democrat)
54	D+40	Erik Martin Dilan	Dem	2014	Incumbent re-elected.	Erik Martin Dilan (Democrat) Khorshed Chowdhury (Republican)
55	D+45	Latrice Walker	Dem	2014	Incumbent re-elected.	Latrice Walker (Democrat) Berneda Jackson (Republican)
56	D+45	Stefani Zinerman	Dem	2020	Incumbent re-elected.	Stefani Zinerman (Democrat)
57	D+44	Phara Souffrant Forrest	Dem	2020	Incumbent re-elected.	Phara Souffrant Forrest (Democrat)
58	D+45	Monique Chandler-Waterman	Dem	2022+	Incumbent re-elected.	Monique Chandler-Waterman (Democrat) Monique Allen-Davy (Republican)
59	D+23	Jaime Williams	Dem	2016+	Incumbent re-elected.	Jaime Williams (Democrat)
60	D+43	Nikki Lucas	Dem	2022+	Incumbent re-elected.	Nikki Lucas (Democrat) Keron Alleyne (Working Families)
61	D+21	Charles Fall	Dem	2018	Incumbent re-elected.	Charles Fall (Democrat)
62	R+26	Michael Reilly	Rep	2018	Incumbent re-elected.	Michael Reilly (Republican)
63	R+2	Michael Cusick	Dem	2002	Incumbent retired. New member elected. Republican gain.	Sam T. Pirozzolo (Republican) Vincent Argenziano (Democrat)
64	R+12	Michael Tannousis	Rep	2020	Incumbent re-elected.	Michael Tannousis (Republican)
65	D+33	Yuh-Line Niou	Dem	2016	Incumbent retired. New member elected. Democratic hold.	Grace Lee (Democrat) Helen Qiu (Republican)
66	D+40	Deborah J. Glick	Dem	1990	Incumbent re-elected.	Deborah J. Glick (Democrat) Ryder Kessler (Working Families)
67	D+37	Linda Rosenthal	Dem	2006+	Incumbent re-elected.	Linda Rosenthal (Democrat)
68	D+39	Eddie Gibbs	Dem	2022+	Incumbent re-elected.	Eddie Gibbs (Democrat) Wilfredo Lopez (Working Families); Daby Carreras (Republican)
69	D+41	Daniel J. O'Donnell	Dem	2002	Incumbent re-elected.	Daniel J. O'Donnell (Democrat) Ian McKenzie (Republican)
70	D+44	Inez Dickens	Dem	2016	Incumbent re-elected.	Inez E. Dickens (Democrat) Delsenia Glover (Working Families); Cynthia Nelson-Acevedo (Republican)
71	D+41	Al Taylor	Dem	2017+	Incumbent re-elected.	Al Taylor (Democrat)
72	D+37	Manny De Los Santos	Dem	2016	Incumbent re-elected.	Manny De Los Santos (Democrat)
73	D+30	Dan Quart	Dem	2011+	Incumbent retired. New member elected. Democratic hold.	Alex Bores (Democrat) Kellie Leeson (Working Families); David Casavis (Republican)
74	D+36	Harvey Epstein	Dem	2018+	Incumbent re-elected.	Harvey Epstein (Democrat) Bryan Cooper (Republican)
75	D+37	Richard N. Gottfried	Dem	1970	Incumbent retired. New member elected. Democratic hold.	Joseph A. Maffia (Republican) Tony Simone (Democrat)
76	D+32	Rebecca Seawright	Dem	2014	Incumbent re-elected.	Rebecca Seawright (Democrat)
77	D+40	Latoya Joyner	Dem	2014	Incumbent re-elected.	Latoya Joyner (Democrat) Tanya Carmichael (Republican)
78	D+37	Jose Rivera	Dem	2000	Incumbent lost renomination. Democratic hold.	George A. Alvarez (Democrat) Michael Dister (Republican)
79	D+41	Chantel Jackson	Dem	2020	Incumbent re-elected.	Chantel Jackson (Democrat) Richard Bryan (Republican)
80	D+29	Nathalia Fernandez	Dem	2018+	Incumbent retired to run for State Senate. Democratic hold.	John Zaccaro Jr. (Democrat) Phyllis Nastasio (Republican)
81	D+30	Jeffrey Dinowitz	Dem	1994+	Incumbent re-elected.	Jeffrey Dinowitz (Democrat) Jessica Woolford (Working Families); Kevin Pazmino (Conservative)
82	D+21	Michael Benedetto	Dem	2004	Incumbent re-elected.	Michael Benedetto (Democrat) John Greaney (Republican)
83	D+43	Carl Heastie	Dem	2000	Incumbent re-elected.	Carl Heastie (Democrat) Tristann Davis (Republican)
84	D+39	Amanda Septimo	Dem	2020	Incumbent re-elected.	Amanda Septimo (Democrat) Rosaline Nieves (Republican)
85	D+40	Kenny Burgos	Dem	2020	Incumbent re-elected.	Kenny Burgos (Democrat) Laurine Berry (Republican)
86	D+38	Yudelka Tapia	Dem	2022+	Incumbent re-elected.	Yudelka Tapia (Democrat) Betty Obregon (Republican)
87	D+38	Karines Reyes	Dem	2018	Incumbent re-elected.	Karines Reyes (Democrat) Ariel Rivera-Diaz (Republican)
88	D+17	Amy Paulin	Dem	2000	Incumbent re-elected.	Amy Paulin (Democrat) Thomas Fix Jr. (Republican)
89	D+32	J. Gary Pretlow	Dem	1992	Incumbent re-elected.	J. Gary Pretlow (Democrat) Andrae Mitchell (Working Families)
90	D+10	Nader Sayegh	Dem	2018	Incumbent re-elected.	Nader Sayegh (Democrat) Michael Breen (Republican)
91	D+19	Steven Otis	Dem	2012	Incumbent re-elected.	Steven Otis (Democrat) John Vitagliano (Republican)
92	D+18	Thomas J. Abinanti	Dem	2010	Incumbent lost renomination. Democratic hold.	Carlo Valente (Republican) MaryJane Shimsky (Democrat)
93	D+15	Chris Burdick	Dem	2020	Incumbent re-elected.	Chris Burdick (Democrat) Gary Lipson (Republican)
94	R+7	Kevin Byrne	Rep	2016	Incumbent retired to run for Putnam County Executive. New member elected. Republican hold.	Matt Slater (Republican) Kathleen M. Valletta-McMorrow (Democrat)
95	D+14	Sandy Galef	Dem	1992	Incumbent retired. New member elected. Democratic hold.	Dana Levenberg (Democrat) Vanessa Agudelo (Working Families) Stacy Halper (Republican)
96	D+8	Kenneth Zebrowski Jr.	Dem	2007+	Incumbent re-elected.	Kenneth Zebrowski Jr. (Democrat) Brett Yagel (Republican)
97	R+3	Mike Lawler	Rep	2020	Incumbent retired to run for Congress. New member elected. Republican hold.	Eudson Francois (Democrat) John McGowan (Republican)
98	R+10	Karl A. Brabenec	Rep	2014	Incumbent re-elected.	Karl Brabenec (Republican) Bruce M. Levine (Democrat)
99	R+6	Colin Schmitt	Rep	2018	Incumbent retired to run for Congress. New member elected. Democratic gain.	Christopher W. Eachus (Democrat) Kathryn D Luciani (Republican)
100	D+1	Aileen Gunther	Dem	2003+	Incumbent re-elected.	Aileen Gunther (Democrat) Lisa LaBue (Republican)
101	R+8	John Salka _{Redistricted from 121st district.}	Rep	2018	Incumbent retired to run for State Senate.	Brian Maher (Republican) Matthew Mackey (Democrat)
102	R+11	Christopher Tague	Rep	2018+	Incumbent re-elected.	Christopher Tague (Republican) Nicholas Chase (Democrat)
103	D+13	Kevin A. Cahill	Dem	1998	Incumbent lost renomination. New member elected. Democratic hold.	Sarahana Shrestha (Democrat) Patrick Sheehan (Republican)
104	D+9	Jonathan Jacobson	Dem	2018+	Incumbent re-elected.	Jonathan Jacobson (Democrat)
105	R+7	Kieran Lalor	Rep	2012	Incumbent retired. New member elected. Republican hold	Anil Beephan Jr. (Republican) Jill Fieldstein (Democratic)
106	D+3	Didi Barrett	Dem	2012+	Incumbent re-elected.	Didi Barrett (Democrat) Brandon Craig Gaylord (Republican)
107	EVEN	Jake Ashby	Rep	2018+	Incumbent retired to run for State Senate. New member elected. Republican hold.	Scott Bendett (Republican)
108	D+6	John T. McDonald III	Dem	2012	Incumbent re-elected.	John T. McDonald III (Democrat)
109	D+24	Patricia Fahy	Dem	2012	Incumbent re-elected.	Patricia Fahy (Democrat) Alicia Purdy (Republican)
110	D+8	Phillip Steck	Dem	2012	Incumbent re-elected.	Phillip Steck (Democrat) Alexandra M. Velella (Republican)
111	EVEN	Angelo Santabarbara	Dem	2012	Incumbent re-elected.	Angelo Santabarbara (Democrat) Joseph C. Mastroianni (Republican) Robert J. Menzies (Working Families)
112	R+2	Mary Beth Walsh	Rep	2016	Incumbent re-elected.	Mary Beth Walsh (Republican) Andrew McAdoo (Democrat)
113	D+2	Carrie Woerner	Dem	2014	Incumbent re-elected.	Carrie Woerner (Democrat) David Catalfamo (Republican)
114	R+10	Matt Simpson	Rep	2020	Incumbent re-elected.	Matt Simpson (Republican)
115	EVEN	Billy Jones	Dem	2016	Incumbent re-elected.	Billy Jones (Democrat) Stephen H. Chilton III (Republican)
116	R+7	Mark Walczyk	Rep	2018	Incumbent retiring to run for New York State Senate	Susan Duffy (Conservative) Scott Gray (Republican)
117	R+18	Ken Blankenbush	Rep	2010	Incumbent re-elected	Ken Blankenbush (Republican)
118	R+19	Robert Smullen	Rep	2018	Incumbent re-elected	Robert Smullen (Republican)
119	R+7	Marianne Buttenschon	Dem	2018	Incumbent re-elected	Marianne Buttenschon (Democrat) John S. Zielinski (Republican)
120	R+13	William A. Barclay	Rep	2002	Incumbent re-elected	William A. Barclay (Republican)
121	R+12	Joe Angelino _{Redistricted from 122nd district.}	Rep	2020	Incumbent re-elected	Joe Angelino (Republican)
122	R+9	Brian Miller _{Redistricted from 101st district.}	Rep	2016	Incumbent re-elected	Dan Buttermann (Democrat) Brian Miller (Republican) Colton Mennig (Working Families)
123	D+6	Donna Lupardo	Dem	2004	Incumbent re-elected	Donna Lupardo (Democrat) Sophia Resciniti (Republican)
124	R+11	Christopher S. Friend	Rep	2010	Incumbent re-elected	Christopher S. Friend (Republican)
125	D+18	Anna Kelles	Dem	2020	Incumbent re-elected	Anna Kelles (Democrat)
126	R+2	John Lemondes Jr.	Rep	2020	Incumbent re-elected	John Lemondes Jr. (Republican) Bruce MacBain (Democrat)
127	D+2	Albert A. Stirpe Jr.	Dem	2012	Incumbent re-elected	Albert A. Stirpe Jr. (Democrat) Karen Ayoub (Republican)
128	D+15	Pamela Hunter	Dem	2015+	Incumbent re-elected	Pamela Hunter (Democrat) Dominick J. Ciciarelli (Republican)
129	D+15	William Magnarelli	Dem	1998	Incumbent re-elected	William Magnarelli (Democrat)
130	R+9	Brian Manktelow	Rep	2018	Incumbent re-elected	Brian Manktelow (Republican) Scott Comegys (Democrat)
131	R+6	Jeff Gallahan	Rep	2020	Incumbent re-elected	Jeff Gallahan (Republican)
132	R+15	Phil Palmesano	Rep	2010	Incumbent re-elected	Phil Palmesano (Republican)
133	R+10	Marjorie Byrnes	Rep	2018	Incumbent re-elected	Marjorie Byrnes (Republican) Sara M. Spezzano (Democrat)
134	R+7	Josh Jensen	Rep	2020	Incumbent re-elected	Josh Jensen (Republican)
135	D+7	Jennifer Lunsford	Dem	2020	Incumbent re-elected	Jennifer Lunsford (Democrat) Joseph R Chenelly (Republican)
136	D+17	Sarah Clark	Dem	2020	Incumbent re-elected	Sarah Clark (Democrat) Orlando J Rivera (Republican)
137	D+25	Demond Meeks	Dem	2020	Incumbent re-elected	Demond Meeks (Democrat) Marcus C Williams (Republican)
138	D+13	Harry Bronson	Dem	2010	Incumbent re-elected	Harry Bronson (Democrat) Tracy A DiFlorio (Republican)
139	R+18	Stephen Hawley	Rep	2006+	Incumbent re-elected	Stephen Hawley (Republican) Jennifer A.O. Keys (Democrat)
140	D+5	William Conrad III	Dem	2020	Incumbent re-elected	William Conrad III (Democrat) Scott A. Marciszewski (Republican)
141	D+39	Crystal Peoples-Stokes	Dem	2002	Incumbent re-elected	Crystal Peoples-Stokes (Democrat) Mary Jo Carroll (Republican)
142	D+1	Patrick B. Burke	Dem	2018	Incumbent re-elected	Patrick B. Burke (Democrat) Sandra J Magnano (Republican)
143	D+1	Monica P. Wallace	Dem	2016	Incumbent re-elected	Monica P. Wallace (Democrat) Frank C II Smierciak (Republican)
144	R+13	Michael Norris	Rep	2016	Incumbent re-elected	Michael Norris (Republican)
145	R+6	Angelo Morinello	Rep	2016	Incumbent re-elected	Angelo Morinello (Republican) Douglas E. Mooradian (Democrat)
146	D+7	Karen McMahon	Dem	2018	Incumbent re-elected	Karen McMahon (Democrat) Katrina A Zeplowitz (Republican); Faye Pietrak (Conservative)
147	R+16	David DiPietro	Rep	2012	Incumbent re-elected	David DiPietro (Republican)
148	R+20	Joseph Giglio	Rep	2005+	Incumbent re-elected	Joseph Giglio (Republican)
149	D+10	Jonathan Rivera	Dem	2020	Incumbent re-elected	Jonathan Rivera (Democrat) Ralph R Hernandez (Republican)
150	R+13	Andy Goodell	Rep	2010	Incumbent re-elected	Andy Goodell (Republican) Sandra A. Lewis (Democrat)

- +Elected in a special election.

== District 1 ==
2022 New York's 1st Assembly District election
- November 8, 2022
Nominee	Fred Thiele	Peter Ganley
Party	Democratic	Republican
Alliance		Conservative
Popular vote	29,862	24,242
Percentage	55.19%	44.80%
Assemblymember before election
Fred Thiele
Democratic
Elected Assemblymember
Fred Thiele
Democratic

The incumbent was Fred Thiele, who ran for re-election.

=== General election ===
==== Results ====
New York's 1st Assembly district election, 2022
Party	Candidate	Votes	%
Democratic	Fred Thiele	29,862	55.19%
Total	Fred Thiele (incumbent)	29,862	55.19%
Republican	Peter Ganley	20,891	38.61%
Conservative	Peter Ganley	3,351	6.19%
Total	Peter Ganley	24,242	44.80%
Write-in		7	0.01%
Total votes		69,841	100%

== District 2 ==
2022 New York's 2nd Assembly District election
- November 8, 2022
Nominee	Jodi Giglio	Wendy Hamberger
Party	Republican	Democratic
Alliance	Conservative
Popular vote	36,604	18,948
Percentage	65.89%	34.11%
Assemblymember before election
Jodi Giglio
Republican
Elected Assemblymember
Jodi Giglio
Republican

The incumbent was Jodi Giglio, who ran for re-election.

=== General election ===
==== Results ====
New York's 2nd Assembly district election, 2022
Party	Candidate	Votes	%
Republican	Jodi Giglio	31,491	56.69%
Conservative	Jodi Giglio	5,113	9.20%
Total	Jodi Giglio (incumbent)	36,604	65.89%
Democratic	Wendy Hamberger	18,948	34.11%
Total	Wendy Hamberger	18,948	34.11%
Write-in		4	0.01%
Total votes		69,841	100%

== District 61 ==
2022 New York's 61st Assembly District election
- November 8, 2022
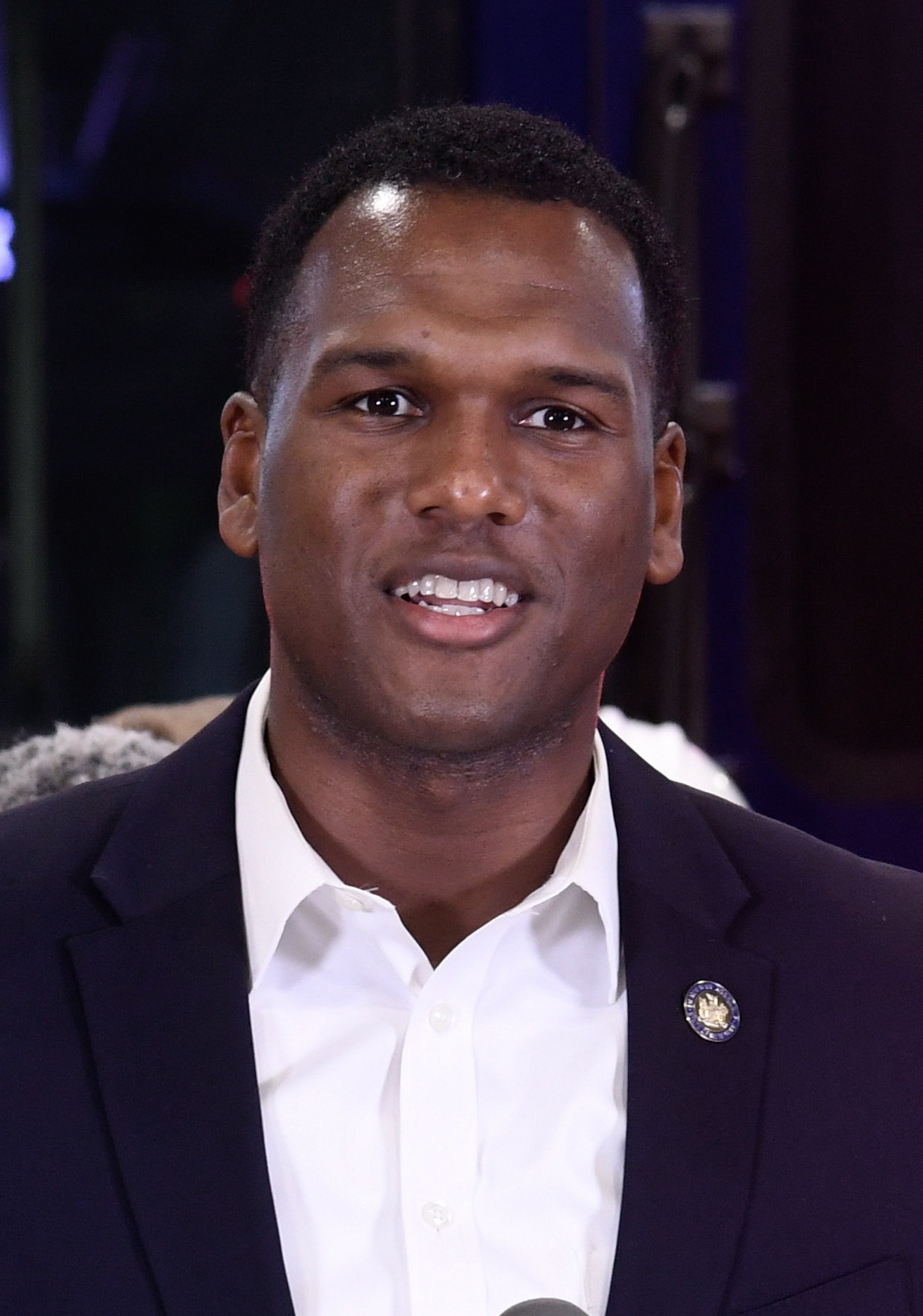
Nominee	Charles Fall
Party	Democratic
Popular vote	21,192
Percentage	97.88%
- Results by precinct Fall: 90–100% No results
Assemblymember before election
Charles Fall
Democratic
Elected Assemblymember
Charles Fall
Democratic

The incumbent was Charles Fall, who ran for re-election.

=== Democratic primary ===
==== Candidates ====
- Justine Cuccia
- Charles Fall, incumbent since 2019

==== Results ====
Democratic primary results
Party	Candidate	Votes	%
Democratic	Charles Fall	4,515	70.16
Democratic	Justine Cuccia	1,894	29.43
Write-in		26	0.40%
Total votes		6,435	100.0

=== General election ===
==== Results ====
New York's 61st Assembly district election, 2022
Party	Candidate	Votes	%
Democratic	Charles Fall	21,192	97.88%
Total	Charles Fall (incumbent)	21,192	97.88%
Write-in		459	2.12%
Total votes		21,651	100%

== District 62 ==
2022 New York's 62nd Assembly District election
- November 8, 2022
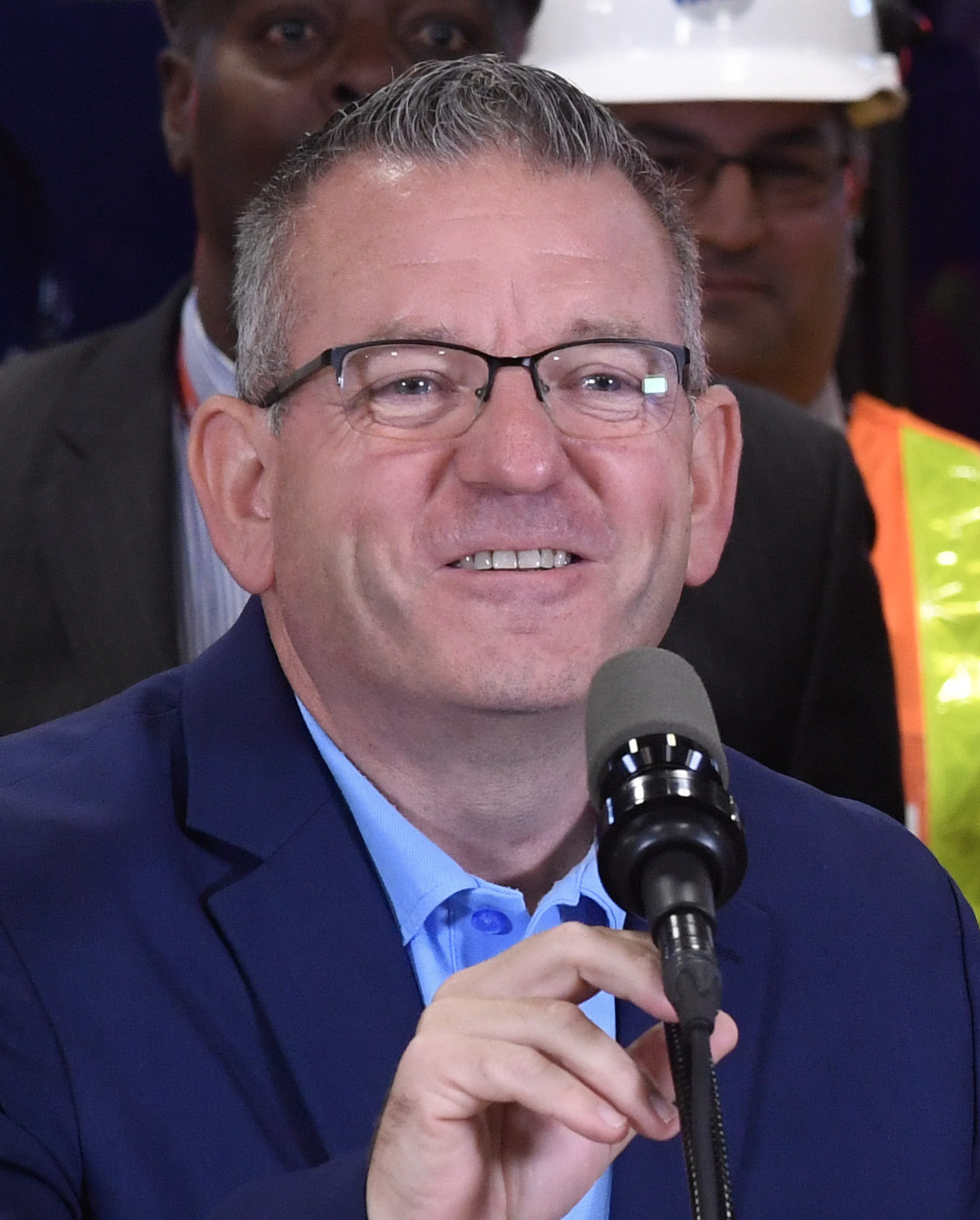
Nominee	Michael Reilly, Jr.
Party	Republican
Alliance	Conservative
Popular vote	42,270
Percentage	99.06%
- Results by precinct Reilly, Jr.: 90–100% No results
Assemblymember before election
Michael Reilly, Jr.
Republican
Elected Assemblymember
Michael Reilly, Jr.
Republican

The incumbent was Michael Reilly Jr., who ran for re-election.

=== General election ===
==== Results ====
New York's 62nd Assembly district election, 2022
Party	Candidate	Votes	%
Republican	Michael Reilly, Jr.	39,172	91.80%
Conservative	Michael Reilly, Jr.	3,098	7.26%
Total	Michael Reilly, Jr. (incumbent)	42,270	99.06%
Write-in		403	0.94%
Total votes		42,673	100%

== District 63 ==
2022 New York's 63rd Assembly District election
- November 8, 2022
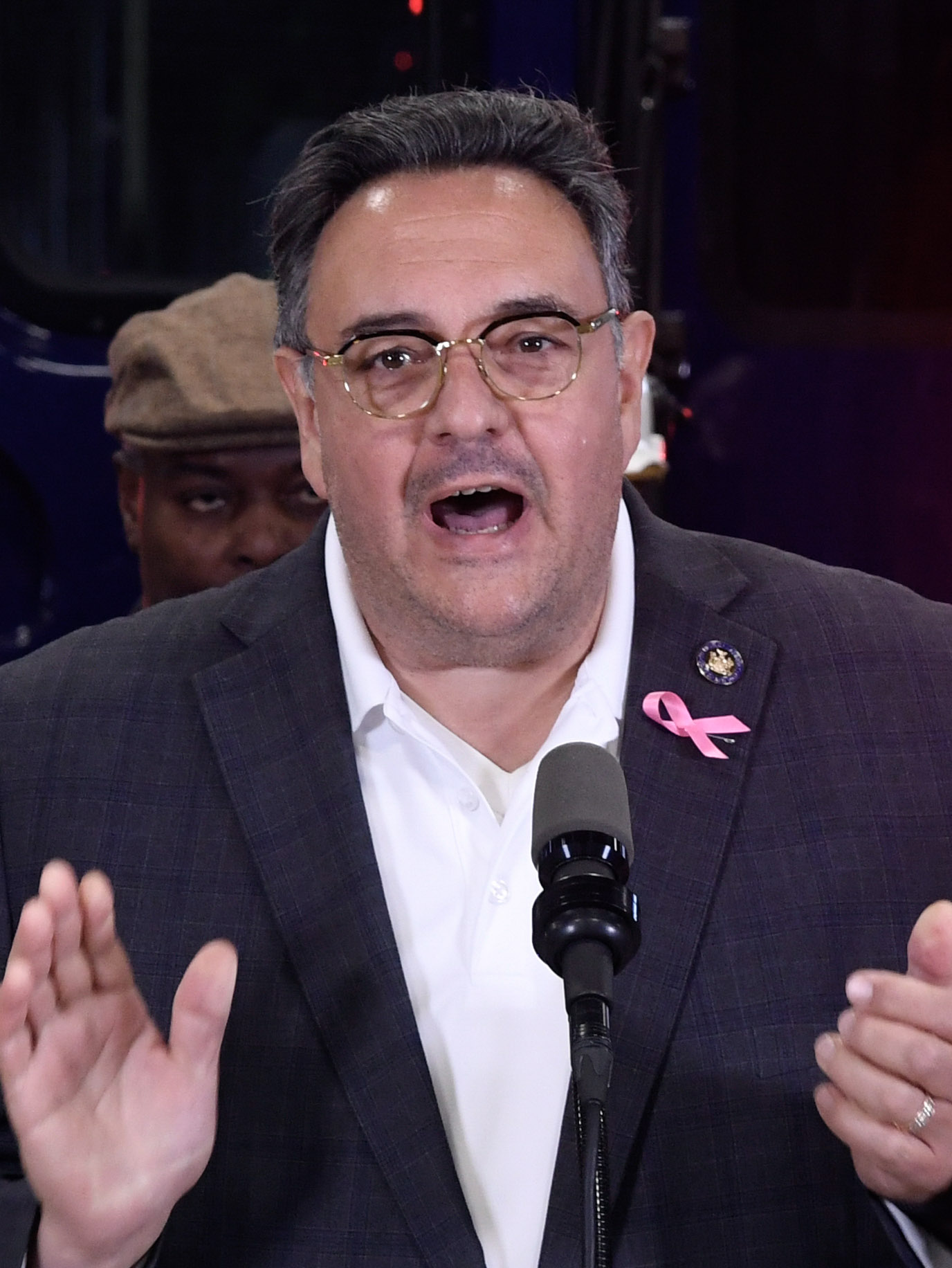

Nominee	Samuel Pirozzolo	Vincent Argenziano
Party	Republican	Democratic
Alliance	Conservative
Popular vote	19,589	18,948
Percentage	54.59%	34.11%
- Results by precinct Argenziano: 40–50% 50–60% 60–70% 70–80% Pirozzolo 50–60% 60–70% 70–80% Tie: 50–60% No resultsː
Assemblymember before election
Michael Cusick
Democratic
Elected Assemblymember
Samuel Pirozzolo
Republican

The incumbent was Democrat Michael Cusick, who chose to retire after 20 years in the Assembly to become the head of the Staten Island Economic Development Corporation.

=== Republican primary ===
==== Candidates ====
- Paul Ciurcina Jr., 2020 Republican nominee for District 63
- Samuel Pirozzolo, 2012 Republican nominee for District 63

==== Results ====
Republican primary results
Party	Candidate	Votes	%
Republican	Samuel Pirozzolo	2,098	60.81
Republican	Paul Ciurcina, Jr.	1,333	38.64
Write-in		19	0.55%
Total votes		3,450	100.0

=== General election ===
==== Results ====
New York's 63rd Assembly district election, 2022
Party	Candidate	Votes	%
Republican	Samuel Pirozzolo	18,065	50.34%
Conservative	Samuel Pirozzolo	1,524	4.25%
Total	Samuel Pirozzolo	19,589	54.59%
Democratic	Vincent Argenziano	15,424	42.99%
Independent	Vincent Argenziano	830	2.31%
Total	Vincent Argenziano	16,254	45.30%
Write-in		38	0.11%
Total votes		35,881	100%

== District 64 ==
2022 New York's 64th Assembly District election
- November 8, 2022
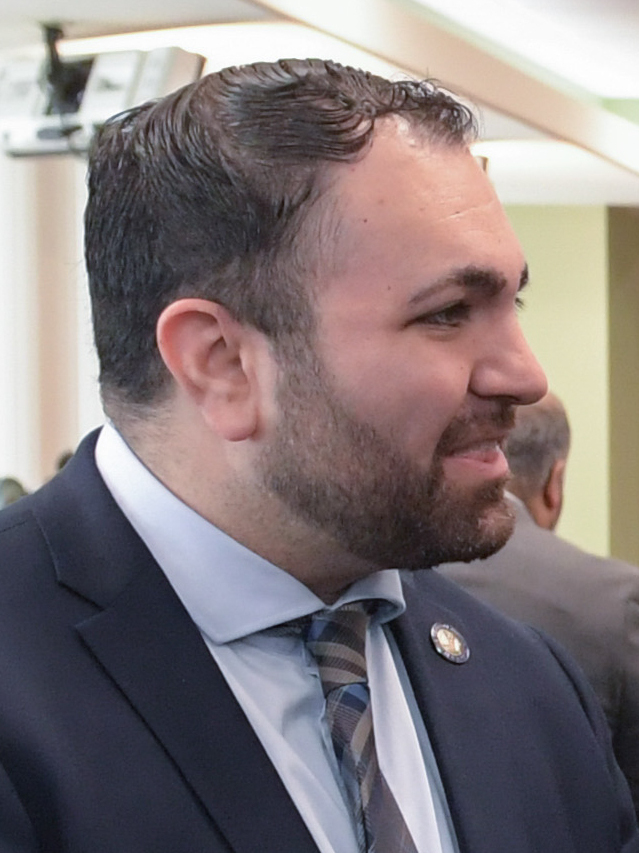
Nominee	Michael Tannousis
Party	Republican
Alliance	Conservative
Popular vote	29,567
Percentage	97.90%
- Results by precinct Tannousis: 80–90% 90–100% No results
Assemblymember before election
Michael Tannousis
Republican
Elected Assemblymember
Michael Tannousis
Republican

The incumbent was Michael Tannousis, who ran for re-election.

=== General election ===
==== Results ====
New York's 64th Assembly district election, 2022
Party	Candidate	Votes	%
Republican	Michael Tannousis	26,690	88.37%
Conservative	Michael Tannousis	2,877	9.53%
Total	Michael Tannousis (incumbent)	29,567	97.90%
Write-in		635	2.10%
Total votes		30,202	100%

== District 65 ==
2022 New York's 65th Assembly District election
- November 8, 2022
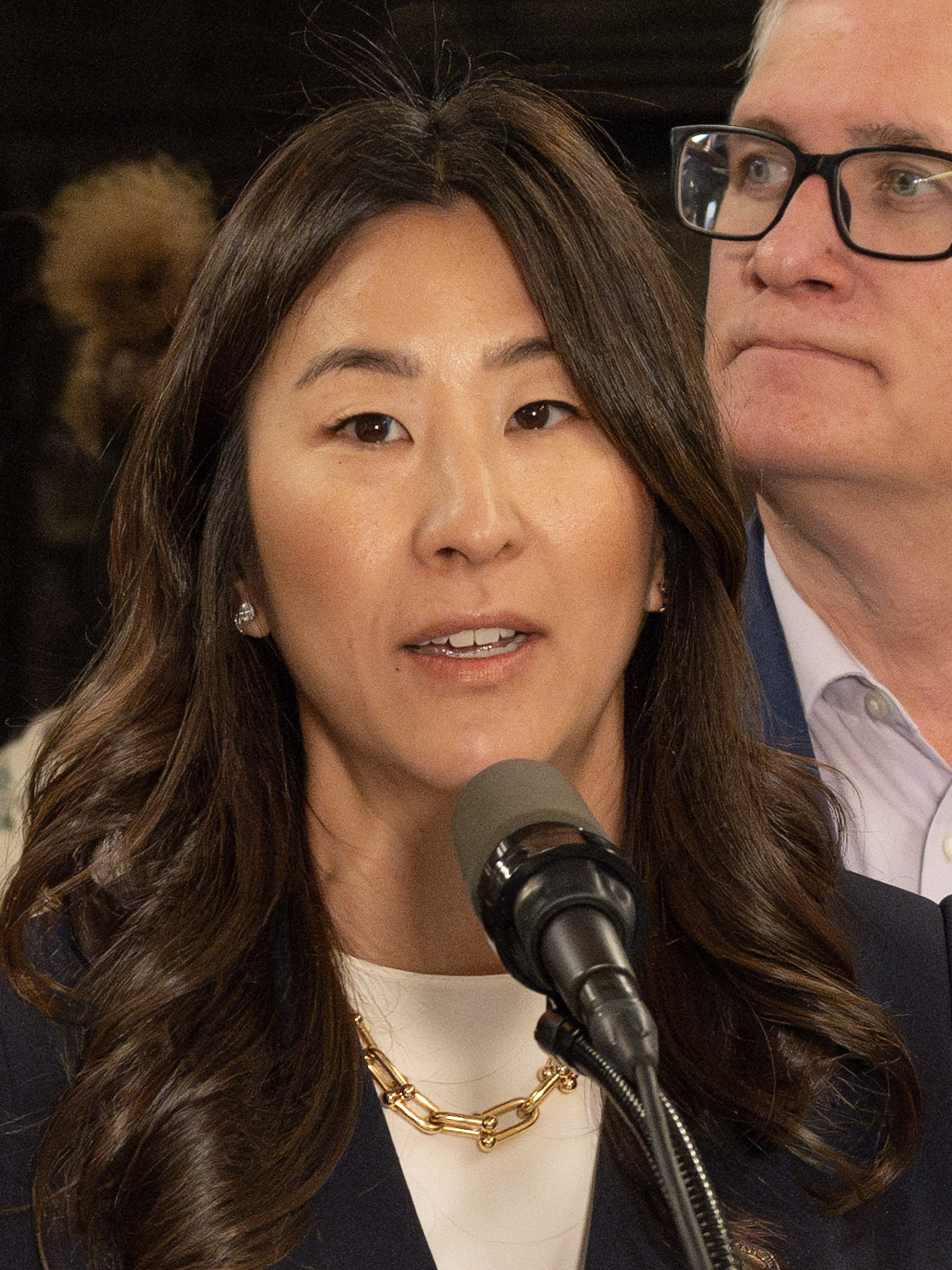

Nominee	Grace Lee	Helen Qiu
Party	Democratic	Republican
Popular vote	20,495	6,381
Percentage	76.02%	23.67%
- Results by precinct Lee: 50–60% 60–70% 70–80% 80–90% 90–100% Qiuː 50–60% No resultsː
Assemblymember before election
Yuh-Line Niou
Democratic
Elected Assemblymember
Grace Lee
Democratic

The incumbent was Yuh-Line Niou, who retired to run for congress.

=== Democratic primary ===
==== Candidates ====
- Grace Lee, 2020 candidate for District 65
- Illapa Sairitupac
- Denny Salas
- Alana Sivin

==== Results ====
Democratic primary results
Party	Candidate	Votes	%
Democratic	Grace Lee	4,653	48.70
Democratic	Illapa Sairitupac	3,305	34.59
Democratic	Denny Salas	1,312	13.73
Democratic	Alana Sivin	285	2.98
Total votes		9,655	100.0

=== General election ===
==== Results ====
New York's 65th Assembly district election, 2022
Party	Candidate	Votes	%
Democratic	Grace Lee	20,495	76.02%
Total	Grace Lee	20,495	76.02%
Republican	Helen Qiu	20,891	38.61%
Total	Helen Qiu	6,381	23.67%
Write-in		83	0.31%
Total votes		26,907	100%

== See also ==
- List of New York State legislatures
