= New York's 94th State Assembly district =

American legislative district

Assemblymember
Matt Slater; R–Yorktown

New York's 94th State Assembly district is one of the 150 districts in the New York State Assembly. It has been represented by Matt Slater since 2023, succeeding Kevin Byrne.

== Geography ==
=== 2020s ===
District 94 is in the Hudson Valley, containing portions of Putnam and Westchester counties. It includes the towns of Mahopac, Brewster, Kent, Lake Carmel, and Patterson and the hamlet of Carmel. It also includes most of Yorktown Heights and Somers.

The district is entirely within New York's 17th congressional district, and overlaps the 39th and 40th districts of the New York State Senate.

=== 2010s ===
District 94 is in the Hudson Valley, containing portions of Putnam and Westchester counties. It includes the towns of Mahopac, Yorktown Heights, Brewster, Brewster Hill, Lincolndale, and Patterson and the hamlet of Carmel.

== Recent election results ==
=== 2026 ===
2026 New York State Assembly election, District 94
Party	Candidate	Votes	%
Republican	Matt Slater		
Conservative	Matt Slater		
Total	Matt Slater (incumbent)		
Democratic	Daniel Guzman		
Write-in			
Total votes			

=== 2024 ===
2024 New York State Assembly election, District 94
Party	Candidate	Votes	%
Republican	Matt Slater	42,072	
Conservative	Matt Slater	4,378	
Total	Matt Slater (incumbent)	46,450	62.6
Democratic	Zachary Couzens	27,798	37.4
Write-in		16	0.0
Total votes		74,264	100.0
Republican hold			

=== 2022 ===
2022 New York State Assembly election, District 94
Party	Candidate	Votes	%
Republican	Matt Slater	32,090	
Conservative	Matt Slater	3,528	
Total	Matt Slater	35,618	62.7
Democratic	Kathleen Valletta	21,230	37.3
Write-in		13	0.0
Total votes		56,861	100.0
Republican hold			

=== 2020 ===
2020 New York State Assembly election, District 94
Party	Candidate	Votes	%
Republican	Kevin Byrne	36,706	
Conservative	Kevin Byrne	4,140	
Independence	Kevin Byrne	671	
Rebuild Our State	Kevin Byrne	118	
SAM	Kevin Byrne	46	
Total	Kevin Byrne (incumbent)	41,681	58.1
Democratic	Stephanie Keegan	30,006	41.9
Write-in		12	0.0
Total votes		71,669	100.0
Republican hold			

=== 2018 ===
2018 New York State Assembly election, District 94
Party	Candidate	Votes	%
Republican	Kevin Byrne	25,615	
Conservative	Kevin Byrne	3,642	
Reform	Kevin Byrne	234	
Total	Kevin Byrne (incumbent)	29,491	56.0
Democratic	Vedat Gashi	21,604	
Working Families	Vedat Gashi	643	
Independence	Vedat Gashi	617	
Women's Equality	Vedat Gashi	298	
Total	Vedat Gashi	23,162	44.0
Write-in		10	0.0
Total votes		52,633	100.0
Republican hold			

=== 2016 ===
2016 New York State Assembly election, District 94
Primary election
Party	Candidate	Votes	%
Republican	Kevin Byrne	2,663	60.1
Republican	Suzanne McDonough	1,766	39.9
Write-in		0	0.0
Total votes		4,429	100
General election
Republican	Kevin Byrne	31,048	
Conservative	Kevin Byrne	4,251	
Independence	Kevin Byrne	1,310	
Reform	Kevin Byrne	151	
Total	Kevin Byrne	36,760	61.4
Democratic	Brian Higbie	23,097	
Working Families	Brian Higbie	1,380	
Total	Brian Higbie	23,097	38.6
Write-in		23	0.0
Total votes		59,880	100.0
Republican hold			

=== 2014 ===
2014 New York State Assembly election, District 94
Party	Candidate	Votes	%
Republican	Steve Katz	16,002	
Conservative	Steve Katz	3,618	
Total	Steve Katz (incumbent)	19,620	52.9
Democratic	Andrew Falk	15,169	
Working Families	Andrew Falk	2,263	
Total	Andrew Falk	17,432	47.0
Write-in		17	0.1
Total votes		37,069	100.0
Republican hold			

=== 2012 ===
2012 New York State Assembly election, District 94
Primary election
Party	Candidate	Votes	%
Republican	Steve Katz (incumbent)	1,623	64.3
Republican	Dario Gristina	900	35.7
Write-in		0	0.0
Total votes		2,523	100
Conservative	Steve Katz (incumbent)	126	80.8
Conservative	Dario Gristina	29	18.6
Conservative	Greg Ball	1	0.6
Write-in		0	0.0
Total votes		156	100
General election
Republican	Steve Katz	24,531	
Conservative	Steve Katz	3,941	
Independence	Steve Katz	1,106	
Total	Steve Katz (incumbent)	29,578	54.3
Democratic	Andrew Falk	22,884	
Working Families	Andrew Falk	2,019	
Total	Andrew Falk	24,903	45.7
Write-in		14	0.1
Total votes		54,495	100.0
Republican hold			
