= New York's 140th State Assembly district =

American legislative district

Assemblymember
William Conrad III; D–Tonawanda

New York's 140th State Assembly district is one of the 150 districts in the New York State Assembly. It has been represented by Democrat William Conrad III since 2021, replacing 44-year Assemblyman Robin Schimminger.

== Geography ==
District 140 consists of parts of Erie County and Niagara County. It contains North Buffalo, the town of Tonawanda, the city of Tonawanda, and part of North Tonawanda.

== Recent election results ==
=== 2026 ===
2026 New York State Assembly election, District 140
Party	Candidate	Votes	%
Democratic	William Conrad III		
Working Families	William Conrad III		
Total	William Conrad III (incumbent)		
Republican	Mohammed Faisal		
Write-in			
Total votes			

=== 2024 ===
2024 New York State Assembly election, District 140
Party	Candidate	Votes	%
Democratic	William Conrad III	35,703	
Working Families	William Conrad III	8,285	
Total	William Conrad III (incumbent)	43,988	99.2
Write-in		354	0.8
Total votes		44,342	100.0
Democratic hold			

=== 2022 ===
2022 New York State Assembly election, District 140
Party	Candidate	Votes	%
Democratic	William Conrad III	24,637	
Working Families	William Conrad III	3,010	
Total	William Conrad III (incumbent)	27,647	58.9
Republican	Scott Marciszewski	15,353	
Conservative	Scott Marciszewski	3,914	
Total	Scott Marciszewski	19,267	41.0
Write-in		31	0.1
Total votes		46,945	100.0
Democratic hold			

=== 2020 ===
2020 New York State Assembly election, District 140
Primary election
Party	Candidate	Votes	%
Democratic	William Conrad III	6,159	54.1
Democratic	Kevin Stocker	5,171	45.4
Write-in		51	0.5
Total votes		11,381	100
Independence	William Conrad III	383	53.3
Independence	Ronald Pilozzi	320	44.5
Write-in		16	2.2
Total votes		719	100
General election
Democratic	William Conrad III	31,378	
Working Families	William Conrad III	3,200	
Independence	William Conrad III	1,038	
Total	William Conrad III	35,616	58.1
Republican	Robert Pecoraro	21,005	
Conservative	Robert Pecoraro	3,588	
Total	Robert Pecoraro	24,593	40.1
Green	Anthony Baney	1,053	1.7
Write-in		55	0.1
Total votes		61,317	100.0
Democratic hold			

=== 2018 ===
2018 New York State Assembly election, District 140
Party	Candidate	Votes	%
Democratic	Robin Schimminger	26,297	
Conservative	Robin Schimminger	3,749	
Independence	Robin Schimminger	1,527	
Total	Robin Schimminger (incumbent)	31,573	70.6
Republican	Adam Ohar	11,615	26.0
Women's Equality	Brian Phillips	823	1.8
Green	Anthony Baney	704	1.6
Write-in		7	0.0
Total votes		44,722	100.0
Democratic hold			

=== 2016 ===
2016 New York State Assembly election, District 140
Primary election
Party	Candidate	Votes	%
Green	Anthony Baney	29	76.3
Green	Danielle Rotolo	9	23.7
Write-in		0	0.0
Total votes		38	100
General election
Democratic	Robin Schimminger	30,802	
Conservative	Robin Schimminger	5,191	
Independence	Robin Schimminger	2,342	
Total	Robin Schimminger (incumbent)	38,335	71.2
Republican	Danielle Rotolo	13,555	
Reform	Danielle Rotolo	398	
Total	Danielle Rotolo	13,953	25.9
Green	Anthony Baney	1,529	2.9
Write-in		9	0.0
Total votes		53,826	100.0
Democratic hold			

=== 2014 ===
2014 New York State Assembly election, District 140
Party	Candidate	Votes	%
Democratic	Robin Schimminger	17,896	
Conservative	Robin Schimminger	3,836	
Independence	Robin Schimminger	2,426	
Total	Robin Schimminger (incumbent)	24,158	73.4
Republican	William Reece	8,736	26.6
Write-in		6	0.0
Total votes		32,900	100.0
Democratic hold			

=== 2012 ===
2012 New York State Assembly election, District 140
Primary election
Party	Candidate	Votes	%
Working Families	Charles Gilbert	9	100.0
Write-in		0	0.0
Total votes		9	100.0
General election
Democratic	Robin Schimminger	30,877	
Conservative	Robin Schimminger	4,259	
Independence	Robin Schimminger	2,017	
Total	Robin Schimminger (incumbent)	37,153	69.7
Republican	Charles Gilbert	14,224	
Working Families	Charles Gilbert	1,917	
Total	Charles Gilbert	16,141	30.3
Write-in		5	0.0
Total votes		53,299	100.0
Democratic hold			

=== 2010 ===
2010 New York State Assembly election, District 140
Primary election
Party	Candidate	Votes	%
Independence	Robin Schimminger (incumbent)	241	53.0
Independence	Kevin Stocker	214	47.0
Write-in		0	0.0
Total votes		455	100
General election
Democratic	Robin Schimminger	17,829	
Independence	Robin Schimminger	2,043	
Conservative	Robin Schimminger	1,912	
Total	Robin Schimminger (incumbent)	21,784	55.0
Republican	Kevin Stocker	17,817	45.0
Write-in		3	0.0
Total votes		39,604	100.0
Democratic hold			
