= Staten Island Economic Development Corporation =

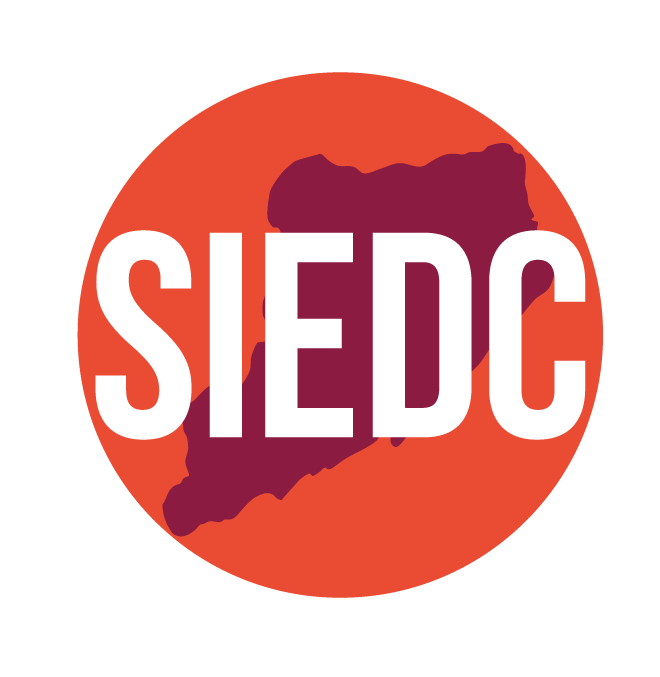
- Logo
- Abbreviation: SIEDC
- Formation: 1993; 33 years ago
- Type: Non-profit organization
- Legal status: 501(c)(3)
- Purpose: Advocate for economic development of Staten Island
- Members: Over 200
- President: Michael Cusick
- Website: www.siedc.org

Staten Island Economic Development Corporation (SIEDC) is a 501(c)(3) non-profit organization that advocates for the economic development of Staten Island's economy. The SIEDC has organized the SIEDC Business Conference and the SIEDC Health and Wellness Expo.

== History ==
The SIEDC was established in 1993 at the behest of Republican Borough President Guy Molinari who named a member of his staff, Cesar Claro, as the first president and CEO, offices he would hold for 29 years. When the SIEDC started it only had a $50,000 budget and 5 employees, but, by the end of Claro's term, had a multi-million dollar budget and over 200 employees. On April 14, 2022, Claro announced that he would be stepping down as president and CEO to reenter the private sector and would be succeeded by his Senior Vice President and a Staten Island Advance journalist, Gina Gutman until a more suitable replacement could be found. On February 21, 2023, recently retired New York State Assemblyman, Michael Cusick (D-63), was named the president and CEO of SIEDC, replacing Gutman.

=== Leadership ===
No.	Name	Tenure	Party	Ref.
1.	Cesar Claro	1993 - April 14, 2022	Republican	
-	Gina Gutman	April 14, 2022 - February 21, 2023	Independent	
2.	Michael Cusick	February 21, 2023 - present	Democratic	

== Projects ==
=== Rossville offshore wind farm ===
On December 8, 2022, New York City Economic Development Corporation (NYCEDC) in conjunction with SIEDC designated NorthPoint the developers of an offshore wind farm at the Rossville Municipal Site. The 33 acre offshore property is owned directly by the city with the goal of turning it into an offshore wind port facility. Additionally, the College of Staten Island was awarded a $566,000 grant to help train offshore wind technicians. In June of 2023, NYCEDC announced the "Summer of Offshore Wind" in conjunction with the SIEDC as an educational program to teach Staten Islanders the economic benefits of the offshore wind farm in the form of new jobs and energy production, stating that the Rossville site will provide 13,000 local jobs.

On April 19, 2023, the first Global Wind Organization certified training facility in the state of New York was opened for potential Rossville site employees, with a formal ribbon cutting on April 21, the facility is an offshore barge and joint venture between Indigo River and Menotti Enterprise named the TMI Waterfront. SIEDC applauded the opening of the facility, with then President Michael Cusick celebrating the cooperation between the two companies.

=== NJ Transit connection ===
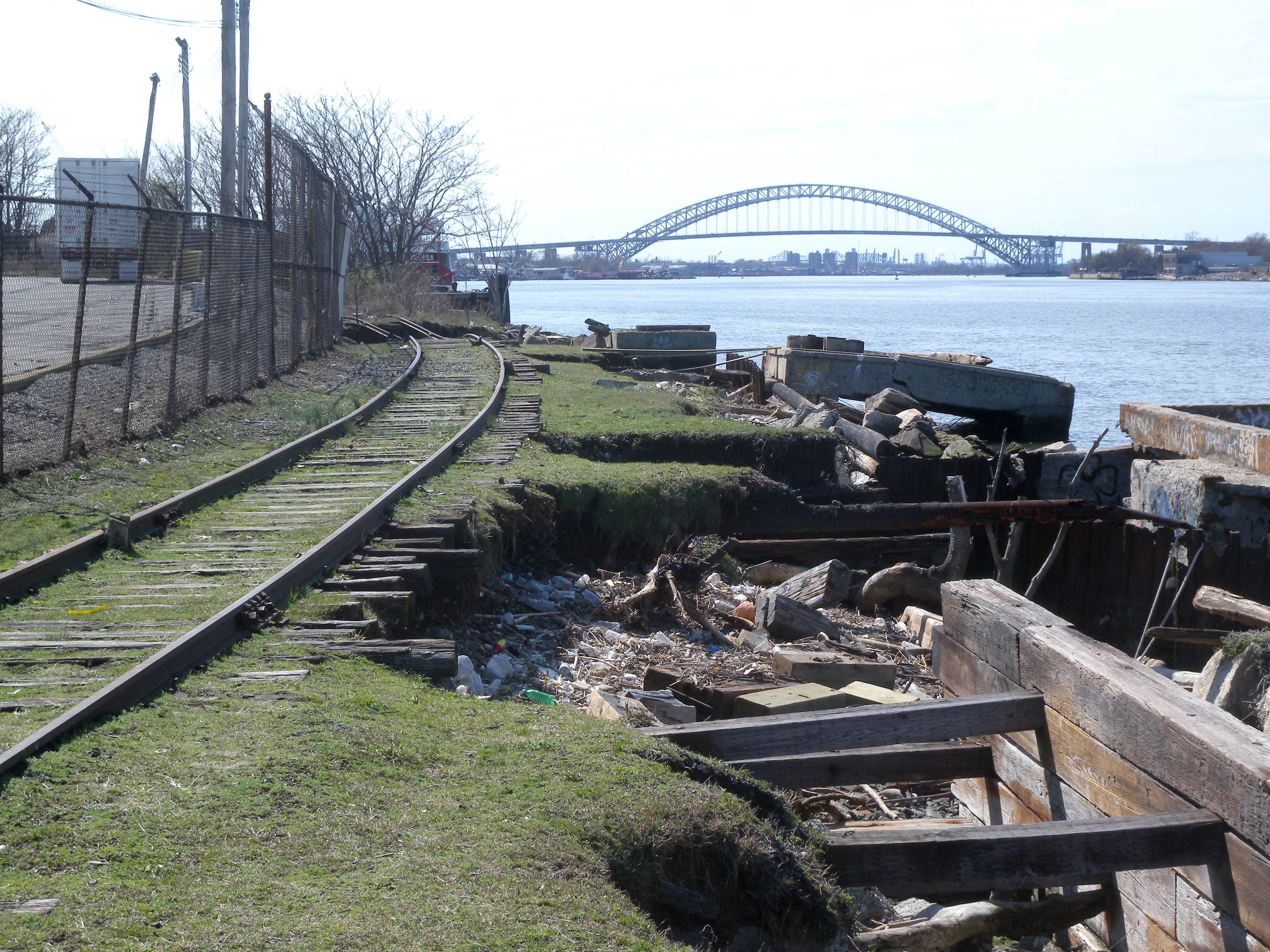
Abandoned Staten Island Railway lines proposed to be refurbished as Light Rail

In May of 2017, New York's Metropolitan Transportation Authority (MTA) allotted $4,000,000 to study a rail connection between Staten Island and New Jersey Transit, namely connecting Staten Island to a Hudson–Bergen Light Rail station in Bayonne via a light rail addition to the Bayonne Bridge. The project, named the West Shore Light Rail has been heavily pushed by the SIEDC, which has collected over 25,000 signatures for candidates promoting it in the New York State Assembly and the New York City Council. Additionally, SIDEC promotes the proposed Staten Island Gondola initiative, a 2.5-mile gondola which would run between Richmond Avenue and Forest Avenue in Port Richmond to the Eighth Street Hudson-Bergen Light Rail Station. The two projects are expected to drastically reduce commute times for both residents of Staten Island and New Jersey.
