= Harold H. Izard =

American politician (1939–2020)

Member of the New York State Assembly from the 140th district
- In office January 1, 1975 – January 1, 1977
- Preceded by: John LaFalce
- Succeeded by: Robin Schimminger

Personal details
- Born: Harold Hale Izard; July 4, 1939 Buffalo, New York
- Died: February 2, 2020 (aged 80) Buffalo, New York
- Party: Democratic

Harold Hale Izard (July 4, 1939 – February 2, 2020) was an American politician who served in the New York State Assembly from the 140th district from 1975 to 1976.

He died on February 2, 2020, in Buffalo, New York at age 80.
