= Sam Pirozzolo =

New York Politician

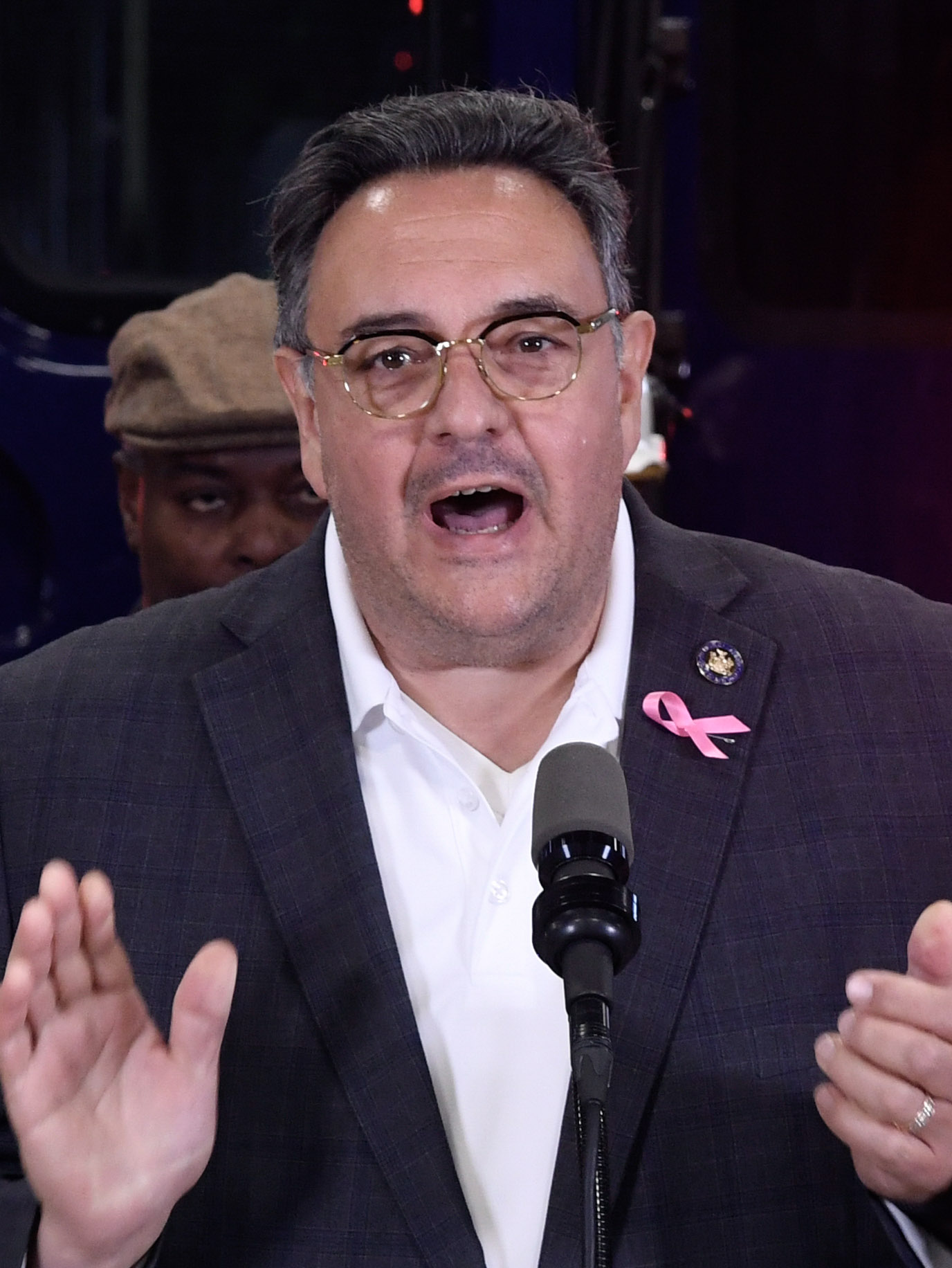
- Pirozzolo in 2023

Member of the New York State Assembly from the 63rd district
- Incumbent
- Assumed office January 22, 2023
- Preceded by: Michael Cusick

Personal details
- Party: Republican
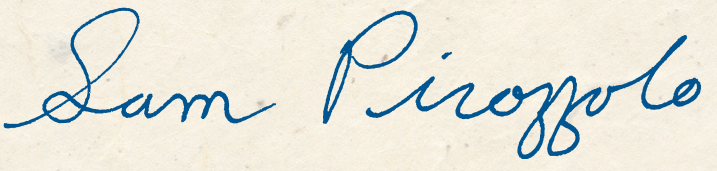
- Signature
- Website: State Assembly website

Samuel T. Pirozzolo is an American politician from Staten Island who currently serves as a member of the New York State Assembly for the 63rd District, replacing the retiring Michael Cusick. Prior to this he had run for several offices in the Borough, and has been involved in the local Staten Island Republican Party.

== Early life ==
Along with his political career, Pirozzolo continues to work as an optician running a private practice for 35 years. He also served as the chairman of the Steinway Street Business Improvement District and was president of the Staten Island Community Education Council for seven years.

In 2014 Pirozzolo, as vice president of the New York City Parents Union, was part of a class-action lawsuit against the State of New York demanding that the New York State Education Department strike down provisions that "prevent the removal of ineffective teachers from the classroom" and "require layoffs of more effective teachers" in economic downturns, during which, the department lays off non-unionized teachers first, regardless of their performance, in an effort to keep as many members of the American Federation of Teachers tenured as possible.

== Political career ==
=== 2012 State Assembly bid ===
During the 2012 New York state elections Pirozzolo was the Republican nominee against Michael Cusick for the 63rd District. Touting his experience with the school board, he was endorsed by former mayor Rudy Giuliani because of "his honesty, business experience and proven record of leadership." Pirozzolo ran on a campaign of reducing road tolls and supporting small businesses to drive economic growth. He also stated, that if elected, he would've opposed mayor Michael Bloomberg's plan to build a trash incinerator on Staten Island, shortly after the Borough closed the numerous dumps on the island. He would be endorsed by the Amalgamated Transit Union's local 1181, namely due Pirozzolo's efforts to restore school bus services while on the school board. Cusick would go on to win the Conservative and Independence nominations and defeat Pirozzolo 66% to 33.9%.

=== 2021 City Council bid ===
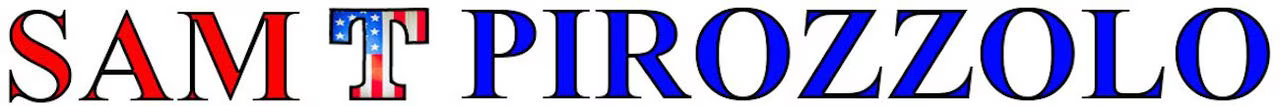
Pirozzolo's logo for his 2021 City Council Bid, featuring his "T"

Pirozzolo was a candidate in the 2021 New York City Council election seeking to represent the 50th District after longtime incumbent Steven Matteo retired. Pirozzolo gained notoriety for the campaign when he erected a 16 ft "T" made of an American flag on his front lawn. the T, which stands for Trump, was the subject to an arson attack and a $2,400 fine from the city government. Pirozzolo argued that the COVID-19 vaccine introduced by former President Donald Trump at the end of his tenure, was effective and that schools, businesses and public places should re-open and life should return to how it was before the COVID-19 lockdowns. He also stated that his top goals would be the economy and public safety, opposing the tax reforms then pending in the city council, as well as supporting Staten Island's Police. Pirozzolo would get third place in the Republican Primary, with 26.5% of the vote, in an election that was mostly centered around the top two candidates, David Carr and Marko Kepi.

=== New York State Assembly ===
Pirozzolo would once again become the Republican candidate for the 63rd District, as incumbent Cusick announced his intention to retire on January 1, 2023. Pirozzolo would face off against Democratic candidate Vincent Argenziano, winning the general election with 54.25% of the vote to Argenziano's 45.64%. Pirozzolo was sworn into the New York State Assembly on January 22, 2023, by State Supreme Court justice Ronald Castorina, at a ceremony at the Joan & Alan Bernikow Jewish Community Center.

The first issues he has focused on while in the Assembly is an effort to alleviate traffic, support education and rethinking the state's proposed bail reforms. Pirozzolo proposed adding turning lanes to Rockland Avenue to alleviate Staten Island's traffic woes. He has also supported expanding homeschooling at a state level, since, despite serving on a school board, Pirozzolo home-schooled his kids. Lastly, Pirozzolo has argued that the last thing the state needs now is a way for criminals to more easily get back onto the streets, and that any effort to lower or eliminate cash bail would result in high re-offending rates, and that instead, there should be a support network for the convicted and new minimum security prison facilities.

== Electoral history ==
=== 2026 ===
2026 New York State Assembly election, District 63
Party	Candidate	Votes	%
Republican	Sam Pirozzolo		
Conservative	Sam Pirozzolo		
Total	Sam Pirozzolo (incumbent)		
Democratic	Matthew Mobilia		
Write-in			
Total votes			

=== 2024 ===
2024 New York State Assembly election, District 63
Party	Candidate	Votes	%
Republican	Sam Pirozzolo	26,858	52.8
Conservative	Sam Pirozzolo	2,298	4.5
Total	Sam Pirozzolo (incumbent)	29,156	57.3
Democratic	Matthew Mobilia	21,481	42.2
Write-in		247	0.5
Total votes		50,884	100.0
Republican hold			

=== 2022 ===
2022 New York State Assembly Republican primary, District 63
Party	Candidate	Votes	%
Republican	Sam Pirozzolo	2,098	60.8
Republican	Paul Ciurcina Jr.	1,333	38.6
Write-in		19	0.6
Total votes		3,450	100.0

2022 New York State Assembly election, District 63
Party	Candidate	Votes	%
Republican	Sam Pirozzolo	18,065	91.8
Conservative	Sam Pirozzolo	1,524	7.3
Total	Sam Pirozzolo	19,589	99.1
Democratic	Vincent C. Argenziano	15,424	99.1
Independent	Vincent C. Argenziano	830	99.1
Total	Vincent C. Argenziano	16,254	99.1
Write-in		38	0.9
Total votes		35,881	100.0
Republican gain from Democratic			

=== 2021 ===
2021 New York City Council Republican primary, District 50
Party	Candidate	Maximum round	Maximum votes	Share in maximum round	Maximum votes First round votes Transfer votes
Republican	David Carr	5	3,625	50.3%	
Republican	Marko Kepi	5	3,583	49.7%	
Republican	Sam Pirozzolo	4	2,172	26.5%	
Republican	Kathleen Sforza	3	618	7.3%	
Republican	Jordan Hafizi	2	414	4.8%	
Write-In		1	43	0.5%	

=== 2012 ===
2012 New York State Assembly election, District 63
Party	Candidate	Votes	%
Democratic	Michael Cusick	21,983	57.4
Conservative	Michael Cusick	2,382	6.2
Independence	Michael Cusick	929	2.4
Total	Michael Cusick (incumbent)	25,294	66.0
Republican	Sam Pirozzolo	12,977	33.9
Write-in		36	0.1
Total votes		38,307	100.0
Democratic hold			
