= Mona Davids =

American activist

Mona Davids is an American activist who is the founder and president of the New York Charter Parents Association and the New York City Parents Union.

== Early life and education ==
Davids was born in South Africa and raised in Brooklyn, New York.

== Business career ==
=== Dutch companies ===
Early in her career, Davids worked for the Dutch companies Schiphol USA Inc. and MeesPierson Investment Bank.

=== Azania ===
Davids co-founded, along with Eric Steinhilber, Azania Holdings International Inc., a firm that promoted trade and investment between the United States and African countries. Taking its name from the historical geographic region Azania, the firm identifies itself as a "Black Economic Empowerment Company" registered both in the U.S. and South Africa. Azania also describes itself as "a business development and communications consulting firm based in New York" providing business consulting services that include: business development, strategic investment counseling, communications & marketing services, project management, branding and web development.

As an officer of Azania, Davids reportedly organized investment conferences in partnership with JPMorgan Chase, Citigroup, and other banks, and sponsored trade and networking events in New York City. In 2007 Brooklyn Goes Global Director Steve Kaplansky praised Azania for facilitating the creation of a memorandum of understanding between the Brooklyn Chamber of Commerce and the Tanzania Chamber of Commerce, Industry and Agriculture that would create "mutually beneficial" relationships between business leaders and decision makers of the two groups. She also "conducted country briefings and trainings for U.S. executives leading Fortune 500 companies stationed in South Africa."

During the early period of her education advocacy, Davids was sometimes described as being on leave from Azania. In September 2010, she spoke at a conference as head of Azania. In September 2014, as CEO of Azania, Davids gave a talk opening the International South Africa ICT & Telecom Tactical Investment Forum in New York City. At the event, Elizabeth Daly, Director of the Division for International Business of the Office of the Mayor of the City of New York, "offered words of support from the Bloomberg administration to the attendees and applauded Azania Holdings International Inc. for bridging the gap and facilitating partnerships between New York City based and South African companies."

== Education advocacy ==
Davids "became involved in education advocacy while on maternity leave in 2008," serving as co-president of the PTA at her daughter's school, according to the website of the New York City Parents Union.

A November 3, 2009, article described Davids as a "Bronx parent who went from charter school foe to cheerleader in under a year." In 2008, it was reported, Davids had been co-president of the parent association of P.S. 160 in the Bronx, where she led the opposition against a new charter school, Equality Charter School, which was set to be located in the same building. After leading protests against the school, however, Davids "sent in her daughter's application to the charter school and began helping the charter recruit other students." She later explained she had been misinformed about how big the charter school would be, and that "A lot of parents are just opposed to charter schools in general, and that's because most parents don't know exactly what a charter school is."

=== New York Charter Parents Association ===
After her daughter was accepted into the charter school, Davids founded the New York Charter Parents Association in April 2009. Davids later stated that she founded the group after her daughter began attending a charter school and Davids "learned that charters are not required to have PTA's."

A May 5, 2009, article in the New York Post reported that Davids, who two months earlier had been fighting against charter schools, was now "leading the charge in the opposite direction — as the founder of the first citywide parent association for charter schools."

A November 3, 2009, article noted that Davids was popping up "everywhere from charter school board meetings and charter renewal hearings to district Community Education Council gatherings," and that she had been "featured in a television advertisement for Mayor Michael Bloomberg's reelection campaign, in which she blasted rival William Thompson's education record."

Although describing herself as "a supporter of charter schools," she claimed that there were "serious issues" with the schools, for example that "the charter system doesn't have district family advocates." According to Davids, she was "on leave from her job as head of the consulting firm Azania Holdings" at the time and was funding her Parent Association efforts herself and with help from an anonymous philanthropist, whose donation to the group would be used to provide a stipend for six parents active in the group. Several P.S. 160 parents who opposed Equality Charter Schools "said they still feel betrayed by her for switching sides in that debate." It was also noted that "Davids' involvement in other charter school siting battles, notably at P.S. 15 and PAVE Academy in Red Hook, has garnered much attention, some of it extremely critical."

With the founding of the New York Charter Parents Association, Davids became the leader of an effort to make certain changes in New York State Education Law and the Charter Schools Act. For example, she "fought to require public schools receive matching funds to renovate their space when co-located with a charter school." Changes passed in 2010 as a result of Davids' activism include: requiring charter schools to accept a certain number of students with special needs and who speak English as a second language, requiring charter schools to form PTAs or Parents Associations, requiring New York City's Department of Education "to provide matching renovation funds to district schools that are co-located with a charter school," and requiring that "every district and charter school co-located in a public school building have a shared-space committee consisting of a parent and teacher from the charter school and other schools in the building." Another change Davids advocated for was the denial to the New York City Department of Education of the authority to authorize new charter schools.

Davids has been a plaintiff in many lawsuits involving schools. In December 2010, for example, she and several co-plaintiffs sued the New York State Education Commissioner and the City of New York for granting a waiver that enabled Cathie Black to become Chancellor of the New York City Public School System.

=== New York City Parents Union ===
In May 2011, Davids formed the New York City Parents Union. At the time of its formation, she sued the New York City Department of Education, charging it with having "botched" Community Education Council elections. The next month, the New York City Parents Union joined with the group Class Size Matters in a lawsuit against New York City Mayor Michael Bloomberg, asserting that his failure to charge charter schools a certain level of rent represented a violation of the Charter Schools Act and Education Law. In February 2013, Davids and other members of the New York City Parents Union sued Governor Andrew Cuomo in connection with the failure of the United Federation of Teachers and Mayor Bloomberg to come to an agreement about teacher evaluation.

In November 2013, the New York City Parents Union joined with Public Advocate Tish James and Class Size Matters in a lawsuit against Mayor Michael Bloomberg in response to his co-location of various district and charter schools. The next month, Davids was the lead plaintiff in a lawsuit against the New York State Department of Education involving the disclosure of student and parent data. In February 2014, Davids and the New York City Parents Union sued Governor Cuomo and the State of New York in a fiscal matter.

The New York Post noted on November 10, 2011, that despite its self-identification as an independent group, the New York City Parents Union had "already received $10,000" from the United Federation of Teachers, and that it would host "its first annual awards benefit" that evening at UFT headquarters, at which honorees would include UFT President Michael Mulgrew, NAACP head Hazel Dukes, and Arthur Z. Schwartz, identified by the Post as "a longtime labor lawyer who represented the transit union during its unlawful 2005 strike, which crippled the city." Schwartz's offices, like those of the New York City Parents Union, are at 225 Broadway, Suite 1902, in New York City.

As of August 2015 the group was not listed on GuideStar, CharitiesNYC.org, or the New York State Attorney General's website of state nonprofits, so further membership and funding totals are not available according to City Limits, though Davids said the group claimed 9,000 members, and countered "We are not listed on any charity, we are grassroots. We are not affiliated with anybody or the charter lobby or education reformers, or teachers, or the teacher unions that they support".

=== Protea Group ===
Davids has been president of The Protea Group Inc. since May 2012. The Protea Group describes itself as "a communications and public affairs consultancy based in New York City...that provides a full suite of services including community relations, strategic advice, issue advocacy, grassroots organizing, public affairs, website development, political management, social media marketing, investment forums and trade missions." The group's website focuses on such services as issue advocacy and the building of political campaign websites.

== Media ==
Davids has appeared on CNN, NBC Nightly News, Fox News, NY1, ABC7, Fox 5 NY, WCBS Channel 2 News, WABC Channel 4 News, and Al Jazeera News.

In a February 25, 2014, op-ed for the New York Daily News, Davids charged that New York City Mayor de Blasio's plan for an expanded pre-kindergarten program "provided no details as to how he is going to address teacher quality, retention and salaries." Noting that the majority of pre-K programs "are operated by nonprofits and community-based organizations," she insisted that it was "time for the mayor to provide more substance and reduce the rhetoric. While it is good to have bold goals, it is wiser to have a good plan."

In an April 8, 2014, op-ed for the New York Post, Davids stated that New York City Mayor de Blasio, who was approaching his 100th day in office, had not yet "presented his education plan for our children." She also charged that de Blasio was "creating a separate and unequal pre-K system — one where students enrolled in community-based organization pre-K programs will receive an education inferior to those taught by certified teachers."

=== Davids v. New York ===
In July 2014, Davids filed a lawsuit to invalidate New York State teacher-tenure laws, and said she expected the suit to be consolidated with a similar suit known as Wright v. New York that fellow school reformer Campbell Brown, head of Partnership for Educational Justice, had already announced she would file. In September 2014, Capital New York reported that the planned alliance with Brown was no more, because Davids held a press conference where she accused Brown "of trying to steal the spotlight and divert resources away from her case" and stated that "Campbell Brown is trying to reform her image and make herself relevant on the backs of black and Hispanic children, our children. This is our lawsuit." At the press conference, members of the New York City Parents Union "held up fake $100 bills with Brown's screaming face in the middle and signs that read 'Campbell Brown does not speak for NYC parents.'" Keoni Wright, a plaintiff in Brown's case, said Davids's allegations against Brown were "disgusting and ludicrous."

Davids has expressed solidarity with a fellow "mom," and advocacy director at the Alliance for Quality Education Zakiyah Ansari, creator of the "Real Campbell Brown" website, which is critical of Brown's charter-school activism.

Davids v. New York draws largely upon Vergara v. California, a similar lawsuit filed in two years earlier in May 2012. The future of the Davids case, in the New York State Appellate Division as of April 2016, was called into question after an April 14, 2016 ruling by the California Court of Appeals which reversed and remanded the trial court's ruling on Vergara, on the grounds that "plaintiffs failed to establish that the state's tenure laws violate students' constitutional rights to equal protection". In August 2016 the Supreme Court of California made the decision to refuse to reconsider the appellate court's decision in the Vergara case, and the NYCPU released a statement which said that the ruling "has no bearing on cases in other states," which it says are focused on legal issues distinct from those questioned in Vergara. The city teachers union's general counsel Adam Ross disagreed with this assessment, however, saying of the Davids case's usage of the initial Vergara decision as a precedent, "When they cite those cases for their benefit, they suffer when those cases are overturned".

Central to the case was the claim that the "'super' due process rights" afforded to teachers in New York and elsewhere in the country through various teacher tenure regulations create an unreasonable barrier for administrators who wish to fire ineffective teachers, ultimately affecting the outcome of students' educations. Richard Kahlenberg, education writer and senior fellow at The Century Foundation responded to this notion that teachers' jobs are unreasonably secure citing major shakeups in cities like Chicago, in which 50 percent of teachers - both tenured and untenured - were replaced in "turnaround schools" programs. Furthermore, he notes journalist Dana Goldstein's research based on figures from National Center for Education Statistics and Bureau of Labor Statistics reports which show that despite the concerns of opponents of teacher tenure laws, tenured and untenured teachers are fired annually with cause across the United States at a rate higher than private sector employees were either fired or laid off - 2.1%, and less than 2%, respectively, during the years for which the data was collected.

=== Criticism of Eva Moskowitz ===
Davids has said that she is "disgusted that [CEO of Success Academy Charter Schools] Eva Moskowitz and other charter leaders are using parents and students as political pawns while continuing to violate the law by not serving their fair share of students with disabilities and English Language Learners, by not establishing Parent Associations and by refusing to be audited by the State Comptroller." She described a March 2014 pro-charter school demonstration in Albany as "an abuse of power by Eva Moskowitz and other charter leaders because no public school would be allowed to shut down for an entire morning to have their students engage in political activities."

The case was dismissed in June 2024.

== Personal life ==
Davids is the mother of two children, a daughter and a son.
