= New York City Parents Union =

- Logo
- Abbreviation: NYCPU
- Formation: 2011
- Type: Education advocacy group
- Legal status: Unofficial/unlisted
- Headquarters: New York City
- Location: 225 Broadway, Suite 1902
- Region served: New York City
- Methods: Empowering parents, supporting school choice, advocacy, legislation and lawsuits
- Members: 9,000 (unverified)
- President: Mona Davids
- Vice-President: Sam Pirozzolo
- Website: www.nycparentsunion.org

The New York City Parents Union is an American student rights advocacy organization, formed in 2011 by President Mona Davids. According to its mission statement, the group seeks to make high-quality public education available to the children of New York, through "empowering parents, supporting school choice, advocacy, legislation and lawsuits." It has been at the center of a number of high-profile lawsuits, most notably the case now known as Davids v. New York, which was closely patterned after a similar case, Vergara v. California. Davids v. New York was eventually consolidated with a similar suit known as Wright v. New York that fellow school reformer Campbell Brown, head of Partnership for Educational Justice, had announced she would file on behalf of seven New York parents. The Davids v. New York lawsuit aims to invalidate New York State teacher-tenure laws, but has since stalled after a California Court of Appeal ruled in April 2016 that "plaintiffs failed to establish that the state's tenure laws violate students' constitutional rights to equal protection".

President Mona Davids and Vice President Sam Pirozzolo are frequent commentators on current events in New York education, and are vocal critics of the mayor, the New York City Department of Education's leadership, and the public school system. In addition to their opposition to certain tenure protections, their commentaries have been published widely regarding a number of other contentious issues, including opposition to the use of bathrooms by transgender students, criticism of credit recovery programs intended to boost graduation rates, and expressing concern for the situation of minority students and teachers, including the controversial firing of two untenured African-American teachers and alleged discrimination against a third black teacher by a principal at a Queens high school.
