= Matt Slater (politician) =

American politician

Member of the New York State Assembly from the 94th district
- Incumbent
- Assumed office January 1, 2023
- Preceded by: Kevin Byrne

Supervisor of Yorktown, New York
- In office January 1, 2020 – December 31, 2022
- Preceded by: Ilan Gilbert
- Succeeded by: Tom Diana

Personal details
- Born: Yorktown, New York, U.S.
- Party: Republican
- Education: Saint Anselm College; Marist College
- Profession: Politician
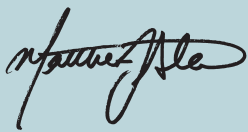
- Signature
- Website: Campaign website Official website

Matthew Slater is an American politician currently serving as a member of the New York State Assembly, representing the 94th district. Before joining the New York State Assembly, Slater served as town supervisor for the Town of Yorktown.

== Early life and education ==
Slater was born in Yorktown, New York, and graduated from Yorktown High School in 2004. He attended Saint Anselm College, where he received his bachelor's degree in political science. He then attended Marist College where he received his master's in public administration.

== Political career ==
Slater was first elected to office in 2020 when he was elected town supervisor for Yorktown, New York, after beating incumbent Supervisor Ilan Gilbert. During his tenure Slater cut town taxes. Slater then ran for the New York State Assembly in the 94th district against Democratic candidate Kathleen Valletta-McMorrow. He won receiving 64.5% of the votes. He was sworn in on January 1, 2023.
