= New York's 63rd State Assembly district =

American legislative district

Assemblymember
Sam Pirozzolo; R–Castleton Corners

New York's 63rd State Assembly district is one of the 150 districts in the New York State Assembly. It has been represented by a Republican Sam Pirozzolo since 2023, succeeding Michael Cusick, who retired in 2022.

== Geography ==
The district consists of neighborhoods within western and central Staten Island, such as Arlington, Bloomfield, Travis, Todt Hill, Silver Hill, Chelsea, Port Ivory, Rosebank, Heartland Village and New Springville.

The district is entirely within New York's 11th congressional district, and overlaps the 23rd and 24th districts of the New York State Senate, and the 49th, 50th and 51st districts of the New York City Council.

== Recent election results ==
=== 2026 ===
2026 New York State Assembly election, District 63
Party	Candidate	Votes	%
Republican	Sam Pirozzolo		
Conservative	Sam Pirozzolo		
Total	Sam Pirozzolo (incumbent)		
Democratic	Matthew Mobilia		
Write-in			
Total votes			100.0

=== 2024 ===
2024 New York State Assembly election, District 63
Party	Candidate	Votes	%
Republican	Sam Pirozzolo	26,858	
Conservative	Sam Pirozzolo	2,298	
Total	Sam Pirozzolo (incumbent)	29,156	57.3
Democratic	Matthew Mobilia	21,481	42.2
Write-in		247	0.5
Total votes		50,884	100.0
Republican hold			

=== 2022 ===
2022 New York State Assembly election, District 63
Primary election
Party	Candidate	Votes	%
Republican	Sam Pirozzolo	2,098	60.8
Republican	Paul Ciurcina Jr.	1,333	38.6
Write-in		19	0.6
Total votes		3,450	100.0
General election
Republican	Sam Pirozzolo	18,065	
Conservative	Sam Pirozzolo	1,524	
Total	Sam Pirozzolo	19,589	54.6
Democratic	Vincent Argenziano	15,424	
Independent	Vincent Argenziano	830	
Total	Vincent Argenziano	16,254	45.3
Write-in		34	0.1
Total votes		35,877	100.0
Republican gain from Democratic			

=== 2020 ===
2020 New York State Assembly election, District 63
Primary election
Party	Candidate	Votes	%
Conservative	Anthony DeGuerre	131	65.5
Conservative	Abraham Monheit	66	33.0
Write-in		3	1.5
Total votes		200	100.0
General election
Democratic	Michael Cusick	28,035	
Independence	Michael Cusick	741	
Total	Michael Cusick (incumbent)	28,776	52.7
Republican	Anthony DeGuerre	23,636	
Conservative	Anthony DeGuerre	1,984	
SAM	Anthony DeGuerre	120	
Total	Anthony DeGuerre	25,740	47.2
Write-in		64	0.1
Total votes		54,580	100.0
Democratic hold			

=== 2018 ===
2018 New York State Assembly election, District 63
Primary election
Party	Candidate	Votes	%
Reform	Michael Cusick (incumbent)	268	91.5
Write-in		25	8.5
Total votes		293	100.0
General election
Democratic	Michael Cusick	20,204	
Conservative	Michael Cusick	5,712	
Independence	Michael Cusick	1,113	
Reform	Michael Cusick	308	
Total	Michael Cusick (incumbent)	27,337	95.2
Green	John Dennie	1,244	4.3
Write-in		123	0.5
Total votes		28,704	100.0
Democratic hold			

=== 2016 ===
2016 New York State Assembly election, District 63
Party	Candidate	Votes	%
Democratic	Michael Cusick	24,104	
Conservative	Michael Cusick	8,221	
Independence	Michael Cusick	2,234	
Total	Michael Cusick (incumbent)	34,559	99.6
Write-in		142	0.4
Total votes		34,701	100.0
Democratic hold			

=== 2014 ===
2014 New York State Assembly election, District 63
Primary election
Party	Candidate	Votes	%
Conservative	Joseph Tirone Jr.	96	58.2
Conservative	Michael Cusick (incumbent)	65	39.4
Write-in		4	2.4
Total votes		165	100.0
General election
Democratic	Michael Cusick	10,963	
Independence	Michael Cusick	1,076	
Total	Michael Cusick (incumbent)	12,039	58.5
Republican	Joseph Tirone Jr.	7,919	
Conservative	Joseph Tirone Jr.	1,287	
Total	Joseph Tirone Jr.	9,206	44.8
Write-in		64	0.1
Total votes		20,570	100.0
Democratic hold			

=== 2012 ===
2012 New York State Assembly election, District 63
Party	Candidate	Votes	%
Democratic	Michael Cusick	21,983	
Conservative	Michael Cusick	2,382	
Independence	Michael Cusick	929	
Total	Michael Cusick (incumbent)	25,294	66.0
Republican	Sam Pirozzolo	12,977	33.9
Write-in		36	0.1
Total votes		38,307	100.0
Democratic hold			

=== 2010 ===
2010 New York State Assembly election, District 63
Party	Candidate	Votes	%
Democratic	Michael Cusick	12,871	
Conservative	Michael Cusick	2,639	
Independence	Michael Cusick	2,196	
Working Families	Michael Cusick	718	
Total	Michael Cusick (incumbent)	18,424	91.2
Libertarian	Danny Panzella	1,732	8.6
Write-in		43	0.2
Total votes		20,199	100.0
Democratic hold			

=== Federal results in Assembly District 63 ===
Year	Office	Results
2024	President	Trump 57.8 - 40.4%
2024	Senate	Sapraicone 54.6 - 44.4%
2022	Senate	Pinion 55.6 - 43.8%
2020	President	Trump 53.9 - 44.9%
2018	Senate	Gillibrand 55.1 - 44.7%
2016	President	Trump 52.6 - 44.4%
2016	Senate	Schumer 65.0 - 33.5%
2012	President	Obama 52.7 - 46.2%
2012	Senate	Gillibrand 65.8 - 33.1%
