= William Conrad III =

American politician

Bill Conrad

Member of the New York State Assembly from the 140th district
- Incumbent
- Assumed office January 6, 2021
- Preceded by: Robin Schimminger

Personal details
- Born: William Charles Conrad III
- Party: Democratic
- Spouse: Mary Kate
- Children: 4
- Education: State University of New York at Fredonia (BA); Buffalo State (MEd)

William C Conrad III is an American politician and educator serving as a member of the New York State Assembly from the 140th district. Elected in November 2020, he assumed office on January 6, 2021.

== Early life and education ==
Conrad is a native of Tonawanda, New York. After graduating from Sweet Home High School, he earned a Bachelor of Arts degree in history and social studies with Honors from the State University of New York at Fredonia and a Master of Education in social studies education from Buffalo State College.

== Career ==
For 21 years, Conrad worked as a social studies teacher and coach in the Kenmore-Town of Tonawanda Union Free School District. He also served for five years as a member of the Tonawanda Town Board, where he was the chair of Water Resources and the Youth Parks and Recreation Committees. As Town Council member he led the Clean Energy Community Designation team, that included the award-winning Solarize Tonawanda campaign, LED street light conversion and was active in the Tonawanda Tomorrow efforts after the close of the NRG Huntley Plant.

He was elected to the New York State Assembly in November 2020 and assumed office on January 6, 2021.
