= Michael Cusick =

American politician (born 1969)

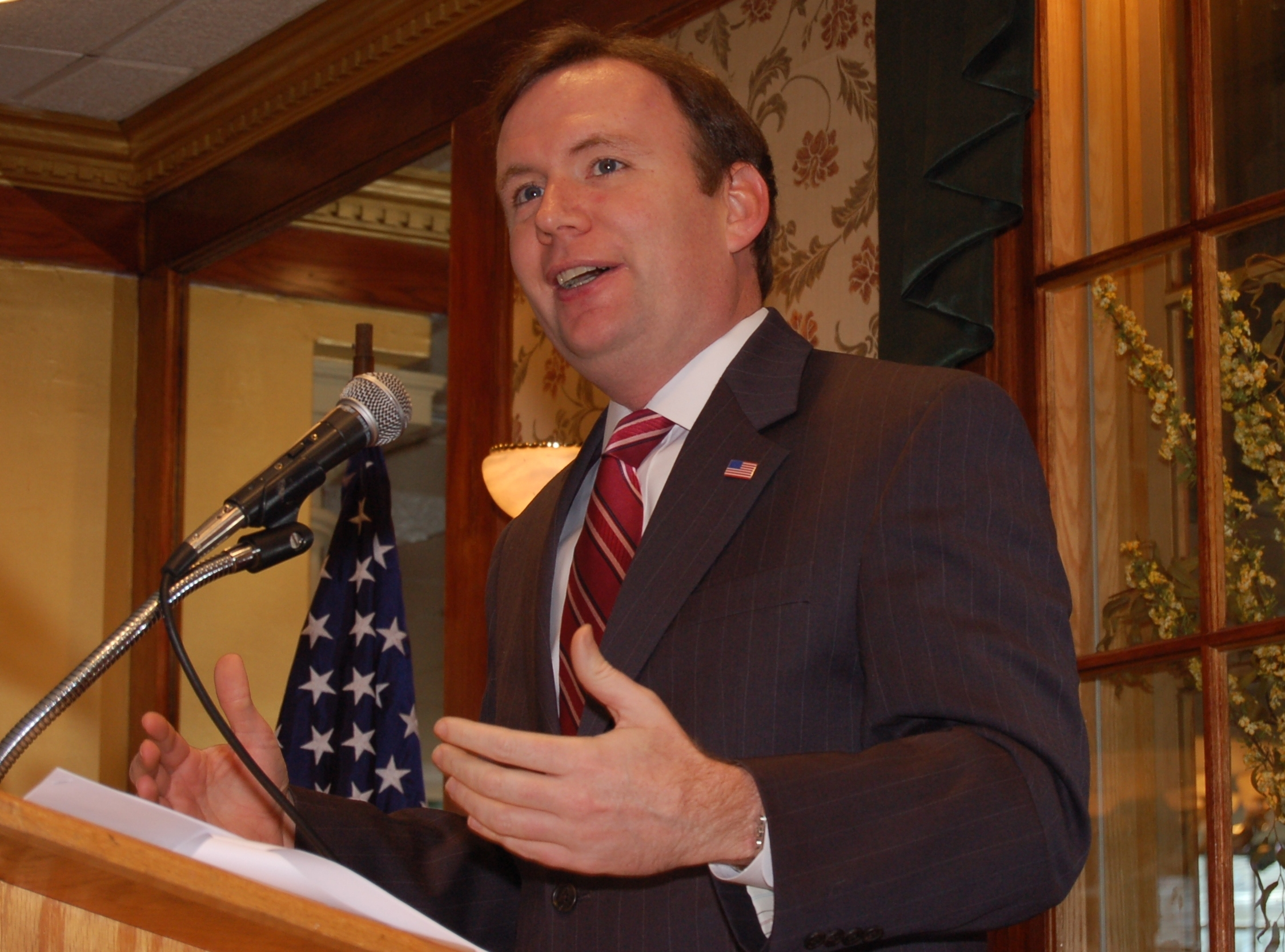

Chair of the Richmond County Democratic Committee
- In office September 18, 2019 – January 9, 2023
- Preceded by: John Gulino
- Succeeded by: Laura Sword

Member of the New York State Assembly from the 63rd district
- In office January 1, 2003 – January 1, 2023
- Preceded by: Steven Sanders
- Succeeded by: Sam Pirozzolo

Personal details
- Born: February 21, 1969 (age 57) Staten Island, New York, U.S.
- Party: Democratic
- Education: Villanova University
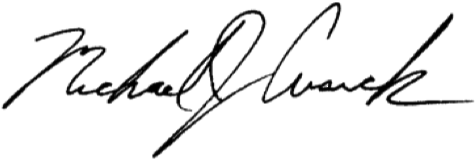
- Signature
- Website: Assembly website

Michael J. Cusick (born February 21, 1969) is a former New York State legislator who represented the New York State Assembly's District 63, in Staten Island, New York. He is a Democrat, and served in the Assembly from 2003 to 2023.

== Early life and education ==
Cusick is the son of the late New York State Supreme Court Justice Peter P. Cusick and Miriam "Mimi" Cusick. In 1987, he graduated from Monsignor Farrell High School, where he was on the cross-country and long-distance track teams.

He graduated from Villanova University in 1991.

== Political career ==
Cusick began his career as a Special Assistant to former President of the City Council Andrew J. Stein. He was the office representative for the Borough of Staten Island and worked on issues regarding incineration and waste management alternatives.

Prior to his 2002 election, Cusick served as the Chief of Staff to former Staten Island Assemblyman Eric Nicholas Vitaliano, managing staff and overseeing the assemblyman's Albany and Staten Island offices. He researched and developed state legislation, including the law to close the Fresh Kills Landfill. Cusick was also Vitaliano's representative to local and statewide civic, professional, and union organizations, on legislative and community issues.

Cusick later became Director of Constituent Services for U.S. Senator Charles E. Schumer, as Schumer's liaison to New York State elected officials and to various federal agencies. He managed the day-to-day operation of the Senator's New York City office. He was elected to the New York State Assembly in the 2002 state elections.

After Rep. Vito Fossella's resignation, the Democratic Congressional Campaign Committee expressed interest in Cusick as the Democratic Party nominee, but he declined.

As Assemblyman, Cusick wrote and sponsored several bills. In 2003, he wrote a law creating a moratorium on building in the area of the Mid-Island Blue Belt (Chapter 84 of 2003). He wrote legislation requiring notice to neighboring landowners of an application to build on wetland areas. In 2006, he helped pass a budget that increased school aid by $500 million over the previous year. The budget also included a down payment of $1.8 billion to renovate and expand city schools. In 2005, he sponsored legislation that allowed New York City to eliminate its share of the sales tax on clothing and footwear (Chapter 285 of 2005). In 2006, he supported a budget that abolished the state tax. In 2008 Cusick introduced legislation that would make it a crime to protest or disturb in any way a funeral or memorial service.

On February 24, 2022, Cusick announced that he would not seek reelection to Assembly District 63. However, he announced his intention to continue to serve as Chairman of the Staten Island Democratic Party. Cusick later resigned as he took up his new role as the head of a local not-for-profit, the Staten Island Economic Development Corporation and was succeeded by one of his vice-chairs, Laura Sword.

During Senate Session 2023, Governor Kathy Hochul appointed Cusick to the New York Power Authority Board of Trustees.

New York State Assembly
Preceded by Steven Sanders	New York State Assembly, 63rd District; 2003–2023	Succeeded by Sam Pirozzolo
