= Steve Katz (politician) =

American politician

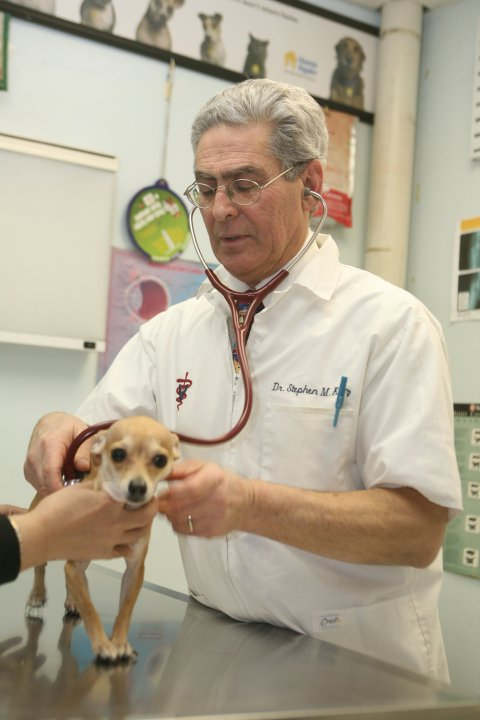

Member of the New York State Assembly from the 94th district
- In office January 3, 2011 – December 31, 2016
- Preceded by: Greg Ball
- Succeeded by: Kevin Byrne

Personal details
- Born: August 11, 1953 (age 73) Jericho, New York
- Party: Republican
- Spouse: Nicole
- Children: 4
- Education: Cornell University; University of Pennsylvania
- Occupation: Veterinarian, Politician
- Website: www.katz4ny.com

Stephen M. Katz (born August 11, 1953) is an American veterinarian, business owner and politician from Mohegan Lake, New York. He formerly served as a member of the New York State Assembly, representing the 94th Assembly District, including parts of Westchester and Putnam counties. Described by the Putnam Examiner as "bombastic" and known "for his fiery rhetoric," he announced his retirement from the state legislature in January 2016.

== Early life ==
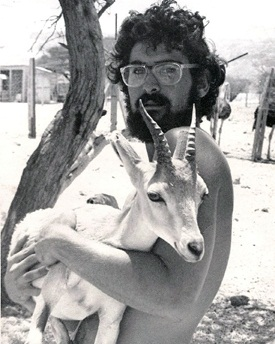
Katz as shown here during his early days as a field scientist and researcher with the World Wildlife fund.

Katz was born and grew up in Jericho, a hamlet in Nassau County, New York on the North Shore of Long Island. In 1972, Katz was involved in an incident at the National Zoo in Washington, D.C., which received wide media coverage after he rescued a man who was nearly strangled to death by a 23 foot long reticulated python which had escaped from its cage.

Katz earned a Doctor of Veterinary Medicine in 1984 from the University of Pennsylvania and a Bachelor of Science Degree in Animal Science from Cornell University in 1976. During his studies, he served as a field researcher for the World Wildlife Fund in French Guiana and Galapagos. Katz then was the assistant director of the Yotvata Hai-Bar Nature Reserve in Israel, and also lived in Italy for two years where he learned to speak fluent Italian.

Since 1989, Katz has been a veterinarian in private practice, while maintaining a residence in the Mohegan Lake hamlet of Yorktown, New York, with his wife and three of their four daughters. A business owner, Katz is the owner and founder of the Bronx Veterinary Center, a million dollar veterinary hospital in the Bronx in New York City. In 1995, he and his wife opened the Concourse Animal Hospital on the Grand Concourse, also in the Bronx. He is also an occasional triathlon participant.

Around 2009, Katz and his family became active members of a local Tea Party, which sparked his political enthusiasm and made him decide to run for office.

== Political career ==
A political newcomer, Katz was elected assemblyman for the 99th Assembly District on November 2, 2010, as a candidate of the Republican, and Independence parties, in an open race to replace Assemblyman Greg Ball who was elected to the New York State Senate. The businessman and veterinarian self-funded his campaign at a cost of almost $200,000. He ran with strong backing from the Tea Party movement. He defeated a Democratic challenger, as well as a challenger on the Conservative Party of New York line whom he had previously bested in the Republican primary in September 2010.

Katz staked out conservative positions on cutting taxes and spending, a balanced budget, and anti-illegal immigration issues, including calling for English to be made the official language of the state of New York. Yet he also attempted to establish pro-conservation bona fides by backing a moratorium on the controversial proposed hydraulic fracturing in the Marcellus Shale region of New York, a process also known as "hydro-fracking."

As one of his first official acts as an assemblyman, Katz offered to provide free veterinary care for the police dogs of the K-9 unit in his home town of Yorktown, as the town was facing a budget crisis. In addition to Yorktown, the 99th Assembly District Katz represents in the New York State Assembly includes the towns of Somers and North Salem in Westchester, the towns of Carmel, Patterson, Southeast and the village of Brewster in Putnam County, and the town of Pawling and village of Pawling in Dutchess County.

== Marijuana ==
As a member of both the Assembly's Alcoholism and Drug Abuse Committee and Higher Education Committee, in 2012 Katz voted against a bill that would have legalized medical marijuana. A year later, and 11 weeks after being ticketed for the illegal possession of marijuana (see below), he reversed positions and voted in favor of another bill to legalize medical marijuana in New York state. Katz explained his earlier vote as the result of a "divergence between the will of his district and his core beliefs."

In March 2013, Katz was stopped by a state trooper on the New York State Thruway for speeding and was charged with possession of marijuana. The following month, as part of a plea deal, the marijuana charge was dismissed in exchange for Katz's payment of $75 fine and performance of 20 hours of community service.

In 2015, Katz developed the company Therabis, using his political connections to secure funding for his private business venture. Therabis aims to heal animals using marijuana-based products. No animals have been reported to be harmed by use of Therabis.

New York State Assembly
Preceded by Greg Ball	New York State Assembly, 99th District; 2011–2016	Succeeded by Kevin M. Byrne
