= Kevin Byrne (New York politician) =

Putnam County Executive (NY)

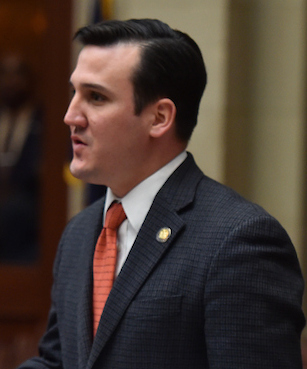

County Executive of Putnam County
- Incumbent
- Assumed office January 1, 2023
- Preceded by: Maryellen Odell

Member of the New York State Assembly from the 94th district
- In office January 3, 2017 – December 31, 2022
- Preceded by: Steve Katz
- Succeeded by: Matt Slater

Personal details
- Born: December 20, 1984 (age 41) Carmel, New York, U.S.
- Party: Republican
- Spouse: Briana Messina
- Children: 1
- Education: University of Scranton (B.A.); Marist College (M.P.A.)
- Website: putnamcountyny.gov Campaign website

Kevin Byrne is the 6th County Executive of Putnam County, NY and is a former state legislator of the New York State Assembly. He is a registered Republican.

As Putnam County Executive, Byrne is both the chief executive officer and Chief Budget Officer of Putnam County government. He serves as chair of the American City County Exchange (ACCE), co-chair and board member of the New York Metropolitan Transportation Council (NYMTC), board member of the East of Hudson Watershed Corporation, and is a member of the County Executives of America, New York State Association of Counties, and New York State County Executives Association. In 2024, Byrne was also named to Run Gen Z's Rising Stars Club where he serves as a mentor for younger Generation Z officials and candidates, supporting a new generation of leaders across America.

During his tenure in the Assembly, Byrne served as the ranking member on the Assembly Health Committee, chairperson of the Assembly Minority Conference Program Committee, co-chair of the Assembly Minority Conference Task Force on Critical Infrastructure and Transportation, ranking member of the Assembly Aging Committee, and vice chair of minority steering. Byrne also served on the Assembly Ways & Means, Governmental Operations, Insurance, Labor, and Transportation Committees.

From 2018 to 2022, Byrne served as the New York State chair of the American Legislative Exchange Council (ALEC).

== Life and career ==
Byrne was born and raised in the Hudson Valley and attended Carmel High School before enrolling at the University of Scranton. As a high school student, he earned the rank of Eagle Scout. At Scranton, Byrne completed the academic portion of the Army ROTC program supported by an internship with then Congresswoman Sue Kelly. However, was ultimately unable to qualify and serve in the Army due to two previous spinal surgeries.

Following his graduation from the University of Scranton in 2007, Byrne returned to the Hudson Valley where he worked for several years in emergency services at Westchester EMS. Simultaneously, he served as a member of the Putnam Valley Planning Board and as a Firefighter/EMT with the Kent Volunteer Fire Department where he served three terms as the department's president. He later served as Deputy District Director to Congresswoman Nan Hayworth and then as a Regional Director for the American Heart Association while finishing his M.P.A. concentrating in Healthcare Administration at Marist College. Prior to running for public office, he also worked as a special assistant in healthcare administration supporting the Senior Director of Clinical Operations at CareMount Medical, which at the time was the largest private multi-specialty medical group in New York state.

Byrne won his first bid seeking elected office in 2016 when he was elected as the Assemblyman for New York's 94th Assembly District.

Byrne lives in Mahopac with his wife Briana and their son.

== Awards and honors ==
Byrne has been the recipient of the 2025 Putnam Young Republicans Teddy Roosevelt Award, 2024 City & State's Hudson Valley Power 100 “Top Ten” list, 2023 Senator Terrence Murphy “Spirit of Yorktown” Award, 2022 Putnam County Land Trust Honoree, 2021 Irish Echo 40 Under 40, 2020 NFIB Guardian of Small Business, 2020 GOPAC Emerging Leader, 2019 Westchester-Putnam Defender of Life Award, 2017 New York State GOP Rising Star, 2017 Highest Rated State Legislator by New York State Conservative Party, 2017 New York State Young Republicans' Wheeler Milmoe Assembly Member of the Year, and achieved the rank of Eagle Scout.

== Putnam County, NY ==
Byrne has served as Putnam County Executive since January 1, 2023. As County Executive, Byrne introduced a variety of new initiatives to enhance transparency and accessibility, centralize services, prioritize spending, and implement new guardrails to control government spending and taxation.

In his first year as County Executive, Byrne reduced the overall tax burden in the budget for the first time in 25 years. Later, he enacted the largest property tax cut in county history, slashing the levy by over $1 million and lowering the tax rate to pre-recession levels and the lowest rate in nearly 20 years. That's in addition to implementing a new tax exemption that eliminated sales tax on clothing and footwear under $110. The tax cuts in Byrne's first term as county executive total to more than $10 million in tax relief for residents — and all with no new borrowing.

That's in addition to other initiatives such as:

- Enacted a true 10% property tax exemption for volunteer firefighters and ambulance workers (Byrne had helped pass enabling state legislation for local governments as a cosponsor in his previous role as an Assemblyman in 2022).
- Committed an additional $2 million into a facility improvement fund to make desperately needed improvements to public facilities including, but not limited to, updated senior center renovations, new handicap ramps and curb cuts, newly renovated Board of Elections with security upgrades that include camera technology, renovated DPW garages, ADA handicap bathrooms, and more.
- Reorganized the county's Highway & Facilities Department into a professional Department of Public Works.
- Merged and centralized Purchasing, Central Services and IT/GIS into a new Department of General Services that streamlined service and enhanced efficiencies to realize greater taxpayer savings.
- Reimagined special education pre-k services with a new Early Learning Center (ELC), supported through a braided model of funding agreement with school district(s) and the county. The ELC cut down costly transportation times, improved the educational experience for children, and is projected to save over $1 million over the life of the contract.
- Funded and completed a new $1.5 million state-of-the-art fire & EMS training center named after the late Lieutenant Michael Neuner of the Brewster Fire Department.
- Authorized the utilization of cameras to crack down on motorists illegally passing school buses. (Byrne had helped pass enabling state legislation for local governments in his previous role as an Assemblyman in 2018).
- Created a new full time position to serve individuals with disabilities as part of the county's recommitment to ThinkDIFFERENTLY.
- Revived the Board of Ethics with active terms and appointments.

In his first State of the county, Byrne proposed local legislation to codify a Taxpayer Transparency Act and a Taxpayer Bill of Rights. To date, neither have been acted on by the Legislature.

In 2023 as the migrant crisis continued to overwhelm municipalities across America, amplified by the expiration of Title 42, Byrne responded directly to the City of New York's migrant placement program which sought to offload its homeless population into neighboring counties with little to no planning or communication. Byrne prevented the city from abandoning its transient homeless population in the county without first obtaining a shared services agreement with Putnam County. New York City sued both Putnam County and Byrne, but the suit was dismissed in its entirety by a New York City judge in New York State Supreme Court.

== New York State Assembly ==
Byrne served in the Assembly for three terms, from 2017 till the end of 2022. During his first term in the Assembly, Byrne voted against every tax increase proposed in the Assembly. This is a primary reason why Byrne was recognized in 2017 as one of five state legislators with the highest rating by the Conservative Party of New York State.

In 2019 Byrne was honored by the Westchester-Putnam Right to Life Committee. In 2020 he received the "Guardian of Small Business" Award from the NFIB, in addition to being named as one of GOPAC's 2020 emerging leaders.

During his first term, Byrne introduced and passed ten bills in the Assembly, eight of which passed the Senate and were signed into law by the governor, more than most other freshmen members during that time. During his three terms in the Legislature, Byrne introduced and passed over twenty bills that have been signed into law by either Governor Andrew Cuomo or Governor Kathy Hochul.

Some brief examples of Byrne's legislation in the Assembly included:

- Honoring the actions of a local Yorktown military hero by designating a portion of state roadway the Major Clayton Carpenter Memorial Highway.
- Designating various local lakes as inland waterways to improve eligibility for state grants
- Loosening a residency requirement for the town of Somers to help recruitment and retention efforts for specific public employee positions that serve the town.
- Making New York more welcoming to a new business by allowing a potential distillery project to both develop and sell alcohol.
- Granting forgiveness for ministerial errors made by a local school district saving the district millions of dollars owed from penalties and previous school aid (initially vetoed by Gov. Cuomo but identical bill language was later included and passed in 2020-2021 FY budget which Byrne opposed for unrelated reasons)
- Increasing awareness about Atomic Veterans, an essential but sadly under-recognized group, through naming a large multi-million dollar pedestrian bridge over the Taconic State Parkway in Westchester County after the state's Atomic Veterans. The general lack of awareness regarding America's Atomic Veterans is largely due to the fact that these veterans were prohibited from sharing stories about their work, due to its top secret nature, until it was declassified in 1996 by the U.S. Congress.

Some other examples of legislation co-sponsored by Byrne that became law include:

- Strengthened the Clean Indoor Air Act (Byrne was the only GOP Assembly member to co-sponsor this legislation)
- Prohibited the practice of conversion "therapy" on minors (Byrne was the only Republican legislator to co-sponsor this legislation)
- Increased access to Automated External Defibrillators
- Better benefits for combat veterans
- Increased access to Epinephrine Auto-injectors
- Expanded cancer coverage for volunteer firefighters
- Created new revenue streams for local fire departments from reimbursement for EMS services

== COVID-19 pandemic ==
In January 2020, as a member of the state Assembly, Byrne was appointed Ranking Minority Member of the Assembly Health Committee by Assembly Minority Leader Will Barclay. Less than three months later, New York State had its first confirmed positive case of COVID-19, and New York's health system was tested in an unprecedented manner.

As numerous scandals unraveled around Andrew Cuomo's administration, Byrne was a loud vocal critic. He called for hearings into the state's pandemic response in elder care facilities, demanded transparency in COVID-19 nursing home data, and ultimately called for an impeachment investigation into Governor Cuomo for his response and subsequent coverup of the state's handling of the virus in nursing homes.

== Electoral history ==
Year	Votes	Percentage of Votes
2016 Primary	2,663	60.13%
2016 General	36,760	61.41%
2018	29,491	58.66%
2020	41,681	62.46%
2022	28,618	98.96%
Total	91,324	68.32% (avg)

== 2016 New York Assembly campaign ==
In 2016, Assemblyman Steve Katz announced that he would not seek another term. Byrne was one of five Republicans that announced they would seek the nomination to replace Katz. At the local Republican Convention, Byrne received 14,562 weighted votes (76%) over Somers Town Councilman Bill Faulkner's 3,681 (19%) and Carmel Councilwoman Suzanne McDonough's 974 (5%). Councilwoman McDonough immediately pledged she would continue a primary campaign.

A day after winning his party's endorsement, Byrne was injured in a Brewster auto accident, breaking his right knee and suffering other injuries when another car, traveling at high speed, crossed into his lane, he said, and collided with him head-on. Byrne continued his campaign throughout his recovery and would later be victorious during the Republican primary, defeating McDonough 60% to 40%. He won the 2016 general election over Democrat Brian Higbie in the 2016 general election with 61% of the vote.

== 2018 New York Assembly campaign ==
In 2018, Byrne was challenged by Vedat Gashi, a Yorktown resident and real estate attorney.

During the campaign, a debate at the Putnam League of Women Voters Forum became contentious due to a dispute between the candidates about whether Byrne had supported legislation that would prevent violent domestic abusers from obtaining firearms, commonly referred to as the "Domestic Violence Escalation Protection Act" (Assembly bill A5025). Byrne voted in favor of the bill in question (A5025) twice.

Throughout the campaign, Byrne argued that his effectiveness was shown by his record of passing more legislation than nearly any other freshmen lawmaker in the state (of the 20+ freshmen legislators only 3 freshmen Democrats passed more). Gashi argued that he could deliver more for the district by being a member of the majority Democratic conference.

Gashi's campaign outspent Byrne's campaign by more than four times, spending more than $250,000 compared to Byrne's approximately $65,000.

The same election year, the state Senate flipped to Democratic control. This was in part due to the loss of a Republican held Senate seat that largely overlapped with the 94th Assembly District. In a year that proved challenging for many Republicans across the state, Byrne won his bid for re-election by a double digit margin.

== 2020 New York Assembly campaign ==
In 2020, Byrne was challenged by first time candidate Stephanie Keegan (D), a Somers resident who had recently worked in insurance billing for CareMount Medical.

Keegan ran solely on the Democratic Party Line. Byrne ran on the Republican, Conservative, Independence, Reform, and Rebuild Our State Lines.

The 2020 election produced a record breaking turnout across the country with an unprecedented amount of absentee ballots turned in.

Byrne won with 41,681 votes (62% of the vote), receiving more votes for that Assembly District than any other candidate recorded in history according to the state board of elections website.

== 2022 Putnam County Executive campaign ==
In November 2021, Byrne announced his candidacy for the position of County Executive for Putnam County, running under the Republican Party. The incumbent executive at the time, Maryellen Odell, was unable to run for re-election after three consecutive terms due to term limits.

Byrne initially faced fierce opposition from the incumbent establishment within his own political party as Maryellen Odell and the Putnam County Republican Party Chairman Anthony Scannapieco publicly endorsed outgoing county legislator Carl Albano for the post. Other senior party officials from the county appeared to follow suit as the sheriff and numerous other county legislators seemingly backed Albano at his announcement.

Prior to the Putnam County GOP Committee's convention the Conservative Party endorsed Byrne. As it became clear that Byrne was more competitive than initially thought, Scannapieco wrote a series of scathing letters attacking Byrne for his decision to run. The effort by Scannapieco and Odell backfired and Byrne won the convention 148 - 76.

Following the results of the convention, Scannapieco immediately publicly pledged his support for Byrne as the Republican candidate. While there was initial talk of a Republican Primary, it stopped as Albano too pledged he would support Byrne. Surprisingly, no Democratic candidate surfaced to run for the open position.

Byrne won the November election to become the 6th County Executive of Putnam County, NY with 28,621 votes (99% of the total votes cast), more than any candidate for county executive in Putnam County history.

== 2026 Putnam County Executive Campaign ==
Byrne is running for re-election in 2026 against Democrat Brett Yarris and Conservative Tatiana Brahimi.

Political offices
Preceded by Steve Katz	New York Assembly, 94th District; 2017–2022	Succeeded by Matt Slater
