= Robin Schimminger =

American politician (born 1947)

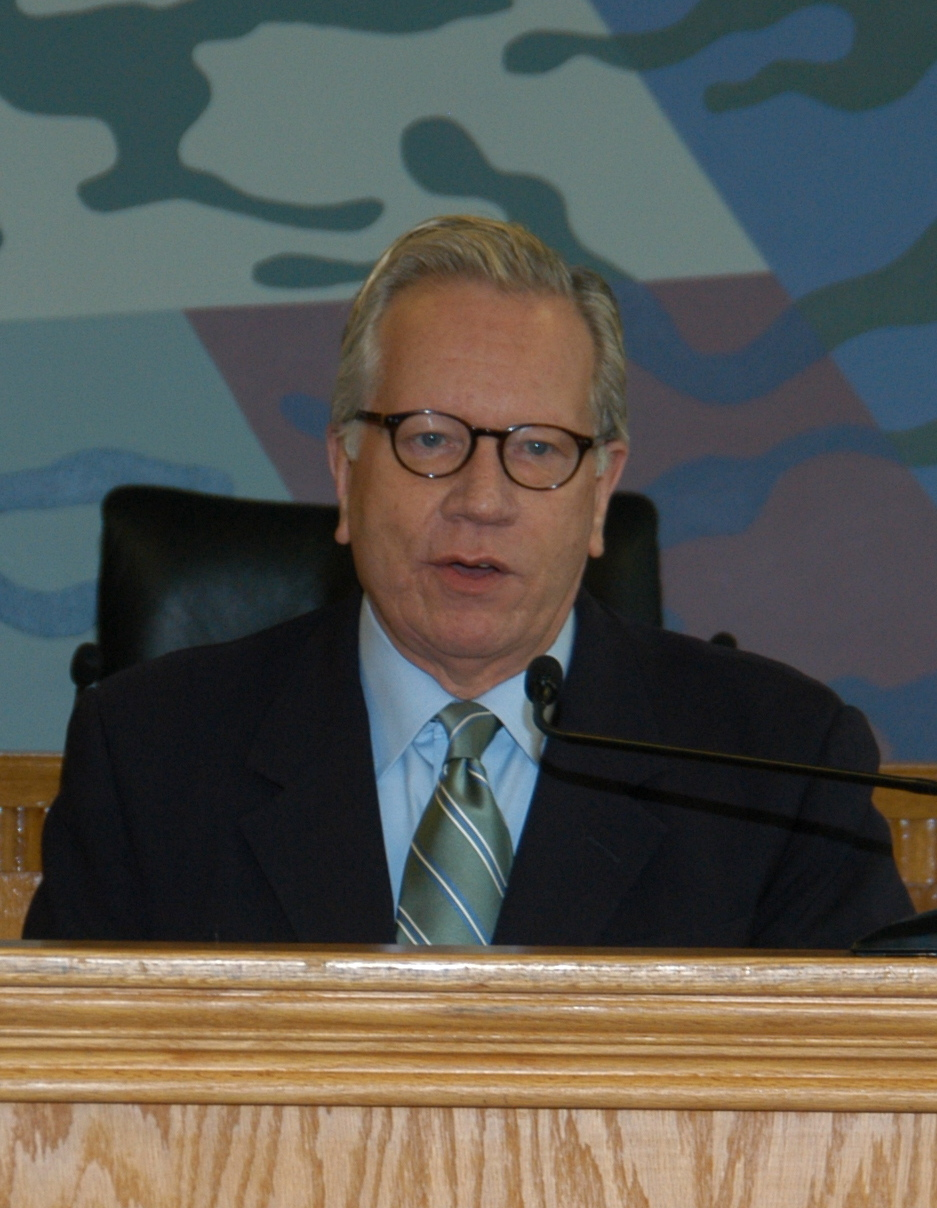

Member of the New York State Assembly from the 140th district
- In office January 1, 1977 – December 31, 2020
- Preceded by: Harold H. Izard
- Succeeded by: William Conrad III

Member of the Erie County Legislature from the 13th district
- In office 1973–1975
- Preceded by: Ronald P. Bennett
- Succeeded by: Leonard Lenihan

Personal details
- Born: September 17, 1947 (age 78) North Tonawanda, New York
- Party: Democratic
- Spouse: Melinda Downey
- Education: Canisius College (BA); New York University (JD)

Robin Schimminger (born September 17, 1947) is an American politician from the state of New York. A Democrat, Schimminger represented District 140 in the New York State Assembly from 1977 to 2020.

== Early life and education ==
Schimminger was born in North Tonawanda, New York and resides in Kenmore, New York. He is a graduate of Canisius College and the New York University School of Law.

== Career ==
First elected to the Assembly in 1976, Schimminger previously served as a member of the Erie County Legislature for two terms. During his tenure in the Erie County Legislature, he chaired the Public Health Committee.

Schimminger was elected to the Assembly 22 times. As of 2019, Schimminger's district (Assembly District 140) included parts of North Buffalo, the Town of Tonawanda, the City of Tonawanda, and part of North Tonawanda.

In 1985, after having served for four years as chairman of the Assembly Subcommittee on Small Business, he was named as chairman of the newly created Assembly Standing Committee on Small Business. He has also served on the Ways and Means, Codes and Health Committees.

Schimminger was a longtime chair of the Assembly Economic Development Committee, and was a frequent critic of the economic development policies of New York Governor Andrew Cuomo.

Some signature pieces of legislation authored or sponsored by Schimminger include the Equal Access to Justice Act, Omnibus Procurement Act and the Linked Deposit Program.

A Democrat, Schimminger is known for working across party lines. In 2019, the Buffalo News reported that "for about a quarter century, Schimminger ran with Conservative Party backing along a 'moderate Democrat' path. The last Western New York Democratic legislator to run on the Conservative line, he remains one of the few Assembly Democrats who opposes abortion and same-sex marriage".

Schimminger announced on November 19, 2019 that he would not seek re-election in 2020. At the time of his announcement, he was the dean of the Western New York delegation in the Assembly.

New York State Assembly
| Preceded by Harold H. Izard | New York State Assembly; 140th District; 1977–2020 | Succeeded by William Conrad III |
