= Helen Foster (politician) =

American politician

Helen Diane Foster

Member of the New York City Council from the 16th district
- In office January 1, 2002 – December 31, 2013
- Preceded by: Wendell Foster
- Succeeded by: Vanessa Gibson
- Constituency: West Bronx, Morrisania, South Bronx, Highbridge & Melrose

Personal details
- Born: New York City, U.S.
- Party: Democratic
- Spouse: Eric McKay
- Children: 2
- Education: Howard University; City University of New York School of Law
- Committees: Aging; Community Development; Education; Finance; General Welfare; Health; Public Safety; State & Federal Legislation (Chair)

Helen Diane Foster represented District 16 in the New York City Council, which comprises the neighborhoods of Morrisania, Highbridge, and Morris Heights for 11 years. She was the first Black woman to be elected within Bronx County. She served as the commissioner for the New York State Division of Human Rights from September 2013 until April 2019 and was appointed to the post by Governor Andrew Cuomo.

== Education ==
Foster holds degrees from Howard University and CUNY School of Law.

== Career ==
Elected in 2001, she replaced her father, Rev. Wendell Foster, who was forced to retire from the city council due to term limits. With her election she became the first African-American woman to be elected within Bronx County. During her tenure on the city council, Foster served as chairwoman of the Parks & Recreation Committee, and served as a member of the Aging, Education, Health, Lower Manhattan Redevelopment, and Public Safety Committees.

Prior to her election to the council, Foster was an assistant district attorney in the Manhattan District Attorney's office, subsequent to which she became an assistant vice-president for legal affairs at St. Barnabas Hospital.

She serves on the board of trustees for Christ Church.

== Personal life ==
Foster resides in Bronx County with her husband, Eric McKay, and their two children.

Preceded by Wendell Foster	New York City Council, 16th district 2002–2013	Succeeded by Vanessa Gibson
