= Latoya Joyner =

American politician

Member of the New York State Assembly from the 77th district
- In office January 1, 2015 – January 8, 2024
- Preceded by: Vanessa Gibson
- Succeeded by: Landon Dais

Personal details
- Born: September 13, 1986 (age 40) The Bronx, New York, U.S.
- Party: Democratic
- Education: SUNY Stony Brook (B.S.); University at Buffalo (J.D.)
- Website: Official website

Latoya Joyner (born September 13, 1986) is an American lawyer and former politician who served in the New York State Assembly for the 77th District from 2015 to 2024. A Democrat, she represented portions of The Bronx including Claremont, Concourse, Highbridge, Mount Eden and Morris Heights. Joyner resigned in January 2024 to become a senior labor advisor at Montefiore Einstein Medical Center.

== Life and career ==
Joyner was born and raised in the Bronx and graduated from the Richard R. Green High School for Teaching. At a young age, Joyner's birth parents lost their parental rights and she was adopted by a foster family. She later attended SUNY Stony Brook for her undergraduate degree and later the University at Buffalo for law school. At Stony Brook, Joyner was a member of Chi Alpha Epsilon Honor Society and Phi Beta Kappa.

Previously, she served as a member of the New York State Bar and with the New York City Criminal Court. She was a community liaison in the district office of former Assemblywoman Aurelia Greene, and later was a member of Bronx Community Board 4.

== New York Assembly ==
Assemblywoman Vanessa Gibson resigned from her seat after being elected to the New York City Council in 2013, and following her resignation, the seat remained vacant for a year. Joyner entered the race to succeed her, and in a four-way primary, easily won the election. She would win the general election with nearly 95% of the vote.

Joyner was sworn in for her first term on January 1, 2015. She served on the Subcommittee on Diversity in Law as its Chairwoman. In 2019, Joyner introduced the "Preserving Family Bonds Act" which would allow judges to order that an adopted child stay in contact with a biological parent who had lost parental rights if it helps the child based on her own experience of reconnecting with her birth mother as an adult after being adopted. The act passed the New York State Legislature but was subsequently vetoed three different times by governors Andrew Cuomo and Kathy Hochul.

Joyner announced her resignation effective January 8, 2024, to pursue a private sector opportunity. She was succeeded by attorney and fellow Democrat Landon Dais. In May 2024, Politico's New York Playbook newsletter reported that Joyner had joined the Montefiore Einstein Medical Center as a senior labor advisor. She was noted as being one of several other Bronx politicians who had joined Montefiore, specifically former assemblymember Marcos Crespo had joined as senior vice president of community affairs in 2020 and former Bronx Borough President Rubén Díaz Jr. joined as senior vice president of strategic initiatives in 2022.

New York State Assembly
Preceded by Vanessa Gibson	New York State Assembly; 77th District; 2015–2024	Succeeded by Landon Dais
