= New York's 77th State Assembly district =

American legislative district

Assemblymember
Landon Dais; D–Highbridge

New York's 77th State Assembly district is one of the 150 districts in the New York State Assembly. The district has been represented by Landon Dais following a special election in 2024, succeeding Latoya Joyner.

== Geography ==
District 77 is located in The Bronx, comprising portions of Claremont, Concourse, Highbridge, Mount Eden and Morris Heights.

The district overlaps (partially) with New York's 13th and 15th congressional districts, the 29th, 31st, 32nd and 33rd districts of the New York State Senate, and the 8th, 14th, and 16th districts of the New York City Council.

== Recent election results ==
=== 2026 ===
2026 New York State Assembly election, District 77
Party	Candidate	Votes	%
Democratic	Landon Dais (incumbent)		
Write-in			
Total votes			100.0

=== 2024 ===
2024 New York State Assembly election, District 77
Primary election
Party	Candidate	Votes	%
Democratic	Landon Dais (incumbent)	1,918	58.6
Democratic	Leonardo Coello	1,338	40.9
Write-in		15	0.5
Total votes		3,271	100
General election
Democratic	Landon Dais (incumbent)	18,104	74.3
Republican	Norman McGill	5,020	20.6
Conservative	Elianni Fabian	1,204	4.9
Write-in		53	0.2
Total votes		24,381	100.0
Democratic hold			

=== 2024 special ===
Due to a provision in state law regarding special elections, the date of this election was set to coincide with the special election in New York's 3rd congressional district.

2024 New York State Assembly special election, District 77
Party	Candidate	Votes	%
Democratic	Landon Dais	1,143	75.0
Republican	Norman McGill	244	
Conservative	Norman McGill	64	
Total	Norman McGill	308	20.2
Write-in	Mohammed Mardah	67	4.4
Write-in		7	0.5
Total votes		1,525	100
Democratic hold			

=== 2022 ===
2022 New York State Assembly election, District 77
Party	Candidate	Votes	%
Democratic	Latoya Joyner (incumbent)	11,284	86.3
Republican	Tanya Carmichael	1,777	13.7
Write-in		7	0.0
Total votes		13,068	100.0
Democratic hold			

=== 2020 ===
2020 New York State Assembly election, District 77
Party	Candidate	Votes	%
Democratic	Latoya Joyner (incumbent)	29,759	89.2
Republican	Tanya Carmichael	3,227	9.7
Conservative	Benjamin Eggleston	368	1.1
Write-in		22	0.0
Total votes		33,376	100.0
Democratic hold			

=== 2018 ===
2018 New York State Assembly election, District 77
Party	Candidate	Votes	%
Democratic	Latoya Joyner (incumbent)	21,859	96.4
Republican	Tanya Carmichael	714	3.2
Conservative	Benjamin Eggleston	95	0.4
Write-in		8	0.0
Total votes		22,676	100.0
Democratic hold			

=== 2016 ===
2016 New York State Assembly election, District 77
Party	Candidate	Votes	%
Democratic	Latoya Joyner	27,327	
Working Families	Latoya Joyner	659	
Total	Latoya Joyner (incumbent)	27,986	98.6
Conservative	Benjamin Eggleston	371	1.3
Write-in		17	0.1
Total votes		28,374	100.0
Democratic hold			

=== 2014 ===
2014 New York State Assembly election, District 77
Primary election
Party	Candidate	Votes	%
Democratic	Latoya Joyner	2,600	69.7
Democratic	Sherrise Palomino	578	15.5
Democratic	Carlton Curry	299	8.0
Democratic	Verdell Mack	227	6.1
Write-in		25	0.7
Total votes		3,729	100.0
General election
Democratic	Latoya Joyner	9,719	
Working Families	Latoya Joyner	309	
Total	Latoya Joyner	10,028	94.7
Republican	Esperanza Reyes Acosta	421	4.0
Conservative	Benjamin Eggleston	81	0.8
Write-in		56	0.5
Total votes		10,585	100.0
Democratic hold			

=== 2012 ===
2012 New York State Assembly election, District 77
Primary election
Party	Candidate	Votes	%
Democratic	Vanessa Gibson (incumbent)	3,066	89.9
Democratic	Anthony Curry	334	9.8
Write-in		9	0.3
Total votes		3,409	100.0
General election
Democratic	Vanessa Gibson	26,208	
Working Families	Vanessa Gibson	343	
Total	Vanessa Gibson (incumbent)	26,551	97.7
Republican	Tanya Carmichael	470	1.8
Conservative	Devon Morrison	142	0.5
Write-in		3	0.0
Total votes		27,166	100.0
Democratic hold			

=== 2010 ===
2010 New York State Assembly election, District 77
Party	Candidate	Votes	%
Democratic	Vanessa Gibson	11,755	
Working Families	Vanessa Gibson	506	
Total	Vanessa Gibson (incumbent)	12,261	95.8
Republican	Tanya Carmichael	362	2.8
Conservative	Robert Marrero	148	1.2
Write-in		24	0.2
Total votes		12,795	100.0
Democratic hold			

=== 2009 special ===
2009 New York State Assembly special election, District 77
Party	Candidate	Votes	%
Democratic	Vanessa Gibson	1,685	
Working Families	Vanessa Gibson	71	
Total	Vanessa Gibson	1,756	74.9
Conservative	Joel Ray Rivera	495	21.1
Republican	Barbara Bowland	93	4.0
Write-in		0	0.0
Total votes		2,344	100.0
Democratic hold			
