= Sheldon S. Leffler =

American politician

Member of the New York City Council from the 23rd district
- In office January 1, 1992 – December 31, 2001
- Preceded by: Herbert Berman
- Succeeded by: David Weprin

Member of the New York City Council from the 16th district
- In office January 1, 1978 – December 31, 1991
- Preceded by: Matthew Troy
- Succeeded by: Wendell Foster

Personal details
- Born: September 6, 1942 (age 83) Brooklyn, New York, U.S.
- Party: Democratic

Sheldon S. Leffler (born September 6, 1942) is an American politician who served in the New York City Council from 1978 to 2001.
