= Harlem Heights =

Harlem Heights may refer to:

- Harlem Heights, Florida
- Morningside Heights, Manhattan
- Harlem Heights (TV series), reality docu-drama series on BET

== See also ==
- Battle of Harlem Heights, American Revolutionary War battle
