= Landon Dais =

American politician

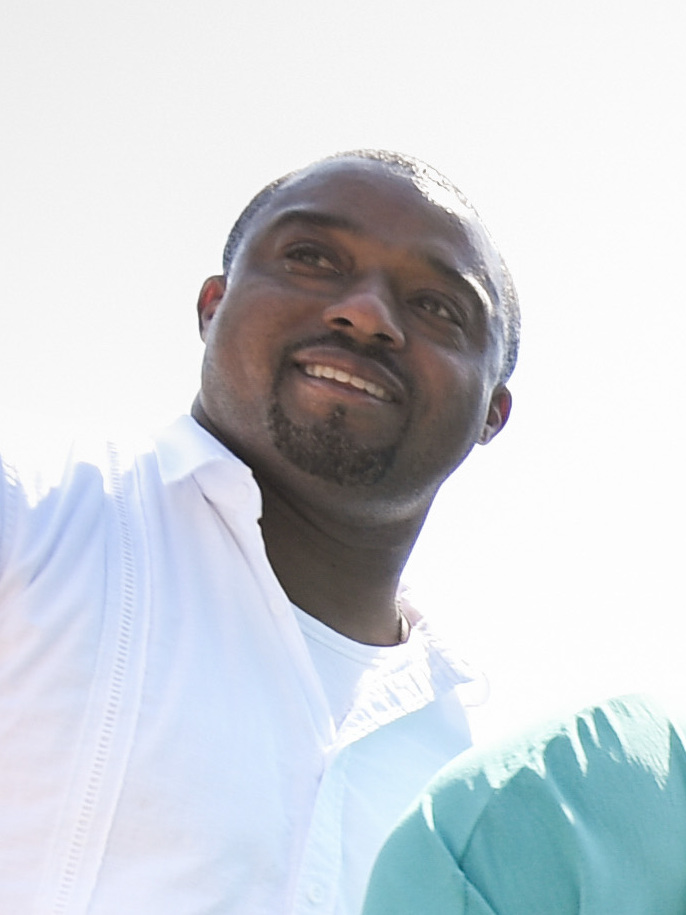
- Dais in 2025

Member of the New York State Assembly from the 77th district
- Incumbent
- Assumed office February 14, 2024
- Preceded by: Latoya Joyner

Personal details
- Born: April 5, 1981 (age 45) New York City, New York, U.S.
- Party: Democratic
- Education: Morehouse College (BA); Columbia University (MS); Hofstra University (JD)
- Website: State Assembly website

Landon C. Dais (born April 5, 1981) is an American attorney and politician who is a member of the New York State Assembly for the 77th district. The district includes parts of Claremont, Concourse, Highbridge, Mount Eden, and Morris Heights in The Bronx.

== Early life and education ==
Landon Dais was born in Harlem to father Larry Dais, a longtime community leader, and the family moved to Mount Vernon where he graduated from Fordham Preparatory School.

Dais is a graduate of Morehouse College where he was a member of the Phi Beta Sigma fraternity, the Columbia University Graduate School of Architecture, and Hofstra Law School.

== Career ==
He served as the president of the Uptown Democratic Club in the late 2000s, where he also started the club's youth division, and worked to register voters for the Obama 2008 campaign. He then worked on political campaigns and in the field of cannabis law. Since 2021, he has served as a vice chair of the Bronx Democratic Party.

=== New York City Council campaign ===
Dais ran for the New York City Council in 2009, challenging incumbent Councilwoman Inez Dickens in the 9th district. He lost in the Democratic primary with 20.86% of the vote. In The New York Times, Dais was noted as being a popular Twitter user and one of the first candidates to use the platform for voter engagement.

During the campaign, Dais was featured on the BET reality television series Harlem Heights alongside seven others.

== New York State Assembly ==
Following incumbent Latoya Joyner's resignation, Dais was selected by the Bronx Democratic Party as their nominee for the special general election to fill the seat. He won the special election on February 13, 2024.

== Electoral history ==
=== 2024 ===
2024 New York State Assembly special election, District 77
Party	Candidate	Votes	%
Democratic	Landon Dais	1,143	75.0
Republican	Norman McGill	244	
Conservative	Norman McGill	64	
Total	Norman McGill	308	20.2
Write-in	Mohammed Mardah	67	4.4
Write-in		7	0.5
Total votes		1,525	100
Democratic hold			

=== 2009 ===
2009 New York City Council election, District 9
Primary election
Party	Candidate	Votes	%
Democratic	Inez Dickens (incumbent)	8,430	66.4
Democratic	Landon Dais	2,648	20.9
Democratic	Carlton Berkley	1,615	12.7
Write-in		2	0.0
Total votes		12,695	100
General election
Democratic	Inez Dickens	21,471	
Working Families	Inez Dickens	1,347	
Total	Inez Dickens (incumbent)	22,818	92.3
Republican	Abbi Rogers-Haff	1,892	7.7
Write-in		4	0.0
Total votes		24,714	100
Democratic hold			
