= Matthew Troy =

American politician (1929–2004)

Member of the New York City Council from the 5th district
- In office January 8, 1964 – December 31, 1977
- Preceded by: Seymour Boyers
- Succeeded by: Sheldon Leffler

Personal details
- Born: Matthew Joseph Troy, Jr. September 23, 1929 Bay Ridge, Brooklyn, New York, U.S.
- Died: December 4, 2004 (aged 75) Queens Village, Queens, New York, U.S.
- Party: Democratic
- Spouse: Dolores Saville (m. 1954)
- Education: Georgetown University; Fordham University School of Law

Matthew Joseph Troy, Jr. (September 23, 1929 – December 4, 2004) was an American lawyer and politician. He was a member of the New York City Council from the New York City borough of Queens from 1964 to 1977 and the leader of the Queens Democratic Party from 1971 to 1974. He pleaded guilty to federal tax charges in 1976 and was convicted of grand larceny in 1979.

== Early life ==
Troy was born September 23, 1929, in Brooklyn, New York, to Matthew Troy, a lawyer and political figure who served as a municipal judge. He graduated from Georgetown University and received his law degree from Fordham University School of Law.

== Political career ==
In January 1964, the New York City Council elected Troy as an interim 5th district councilman to replace Seymour Boyers, who had been elected as the at-large council member for Queens. As this was an interim appointment, he would have to run in the 1964 general election to secure the seat for the remainder of Boyers’ term. Troy actively opposed forced busing, a hot-button issue in eastern Queens, where an anti-integration organization, Parents and Taxpayers, had a strong following. In the general election, he defeated Republican Robert McMillan.

In 1970, Troy briefly ran for the Democratic nomination for Attorney General of New York. He withdrew from the race in favor of Adam Walinsky. He later became the Democratic Party leader in Queens in 1971, succeeding Frank Smith.

As a councilman and party leader, Troy clashed with Mayors John Lindsay and Abraham Beame throughout his career. He was a critic of Lindsay’s policies, especially with regard to a planned low-income housing development in Forest Hills. Troy also was an early backer of Senator George McGovern in the race for the 1972 Democratic nomination over Mayor Lindsay.

In the 1973 election for Mayor, Troy supported the conservative Democratic Representative Mario Biaggi in the Democratic primary. His support for Biaggi came after making an initial promise of an endorsement to Beame. After Beame's victory, Troy began to clash with the new mayor over his austere budgets. In 1974, Beame worked with Donald Manes, the Borough President Of Queens, and a friend of Troy, to arrange Troy’s ouster as Democratic leader. Troy had angered Manes when he switched support to Howard J. Samuels in the 1974 race for Governor of New York.

== Convictions ==
In 1976, Troy faced federal income tax charges for failing to report income on funds that he had stolen from his clients’ estates. Troy pleaded guilty to one charge of filing a false tax return and served 55 days in prison. Although he pleaded guilty to a felony, under state law, the crime was a misdemeanor which allowed him to hold on to his council seat. He was disbarred after the plea.

He ran for re-election in 1977 but lost the Democratic nomination to Sheldon Leffler in the wake of his conviction. Leffler, coincidentally, was eventually convicted of campaign fraud in 2013.

The State of New York indicted him on larceny and perjury charges as a result of the federal investigation in 1977. A judge dismissed the perjury charge but let the remaining larceny charges go to trial. At his trial, Troy stated that he took the money because he overdrew his checking account. A judge turned aside his argument that the charges constituted double jeopardy and that his agreement with federal prosecutors to face no further charges did not permit the conviction. In 1979, Troy consented to a guilty verdict and was sentenced to 26 weekends in prison.

== Later life and death ==
Troy was the executive director of the Long Island Gasoline Retailers Association but did not enter politics again. He practiced law after the restoration of his law license for the remainder of his life. He died on December 4, 2004, from Parkinson's disease.
