= Althea Stevens =

American politician (born 1983)

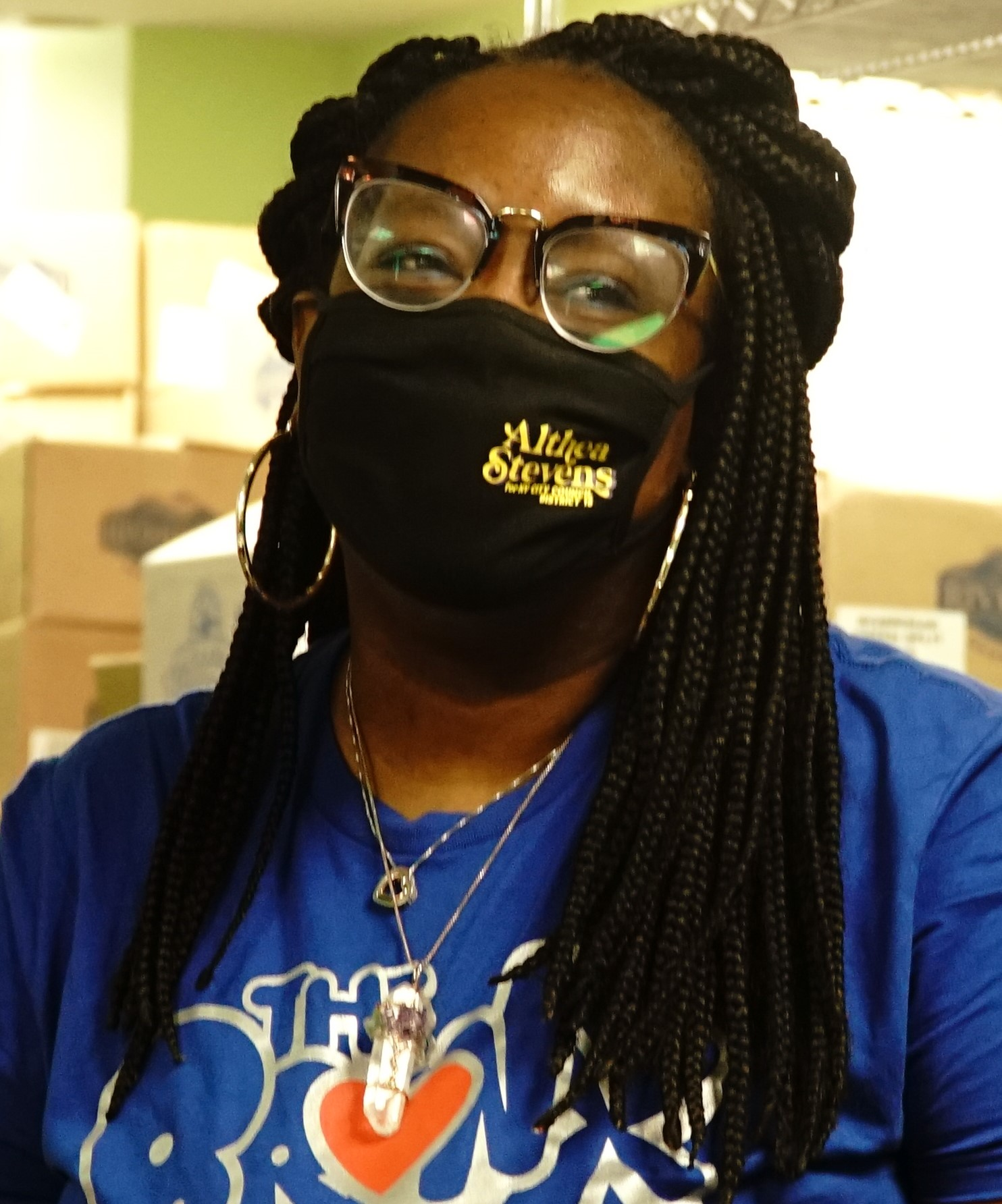

Member of the New York City Council from the 16th district
- Incumbent
- Assumed office January 1, 2022
- Preceded by: Vanessa Gibson

Personal details
- Born: January 2, 1983 (age 43)
- Party: Democratic
- Education: Long Island University (BA); Hunter College (MA)
- Website: Official website

Althea V. Stevens (January 2, 1983) is an American politician who has represented the 16th district on the New York City Council since 2022. Her district encompasses the South Bronx communities of Morrisania, Concourse, Highbridge, and Morris Heights.

== Early life and education ==
A native of New York City, Stevens graduated from Hunter College. Before her election to the City Council, Stevens was a member of the New York City Housing Authority (NYCHA) Tenants Association.

== Career ==
Before her election to the City Council, Stevens was a member of the New York City Housing Authority (NYCHA) Tenants Association.

=== New York City Council ===
Stevens was a successful candidate for the New York City Council in the 2021 election. During her candidacy for office, Stevens endorsed reducing the New York City Police Department's (NYPD) budget by a minimum of $1 million. Stevens' campaign was endorsed by the Working Families Party (WFP).

On the council, she chairs the Committee on Youth Services, which has jurisdiction over the Department of Youth and Community Development.

On December 5, 2024, Stevens was one of the 30 council members voted for The City of Yes legislation. The legislation allows the conversion and construction of 80,000 legal and new housing units across the 5 boroughs of New York. It awaits Mayor Adam's signature.

== Personal life ==
Stevens owns two turtles, named Purple and Squirt.

== Electoral history ==
=== 2025 ===
2025 New York City Council Democratic primary, District 16
Party	Candidate	Votes	%
Democratic	Althea Stevens (incumbent)	7,243	70.9
Democratic	Shakur T. Joseph	2,867	28.1
Write-in		105	1.0
Total votes		10,215	100.0

2025 New York City Council election, District 16
Party	Candidate	Votes	%
Democratic	Althea Stevens	16,562	80.0
Working Families	Althea Stevens	1,740	8.4
Total	Althea Stevens (incumbent)	18,302	88.4
Republican	Emmanuel Findlay	1,947	9.4
Conservative	Emmanuel Findlay	410	2.0
Total	Emmanuel Findlay	2,357	11.4
Write-in		38	0.2
Total votes		20,697	100.0
Democratic hold			

=== 2023 ===
2023 New York City Council election, District 16
Party	Candidate	Votes	%
Democratic	Althea Stevens (incumbent)	4,384	85.4
Republican	Tanya Carmichael	702	13.7
Write-in		50	1.0
Total votes		5,136	100.0
Democratic hold			

=== 2021 ===
2021 New York City Council Democratic primary, District 16
Party	Candidate	Votes	%
Democratic	Althea Stevens	5,125	50.7
Democratic	Ahmadou T. Diallo	2,075	20.5
Democratic	Abdourahamane Diallo	2,046	20.2
Democratic	Yves T. Filius	795	7.9
Write-in		71	0.7
Total votes		10,112	100.0

2021 New York City Council election, District 16
Party	Candidate	Votes	%
Democratic	Althea Stevens	10,002	90.7
Republican	Kajara R. Boyd	1,011	9.2
Write-in		17	0.2
Total votes		11,030	100.0
Democratic hold			
