= Wendell Foster =

American politician (1924–2019)

Reverend T. Wendell Foster

Member of the New York City Council from the 16th district
- In office January 1, 1992 – December 31, 2001
- Preceded by: Sheldon S. Leffler
- Succeeded by: Helen Foster

Member of the New York City Council from the 9th district
- In office January 1, 1978 – December 31, 1991
- Preceded by: Barry Salman
- Succeeded by: C. Virginia Fields

Personal details
- Born: February 14, 1924
- Died: September 3, 2019 (aged 95) New York, New York, U.S.
- Political party: Democratic

Reverend T. Wendell Foster (February 14, 1924 - September 3, 2019) was an American politician who served on the New York City Council from 1978 to 2001. He was the first Black elected city official in the Bronx. The Rev. T. Wendell Foster Park and Recreation Center, formerly Mullaly Park, is named after him. His daughter, Helen Diane Foster, served as the Commissioner of the New York State Division of Human Rights.
