= Vanessa Gibson =

American politician (born 1979)

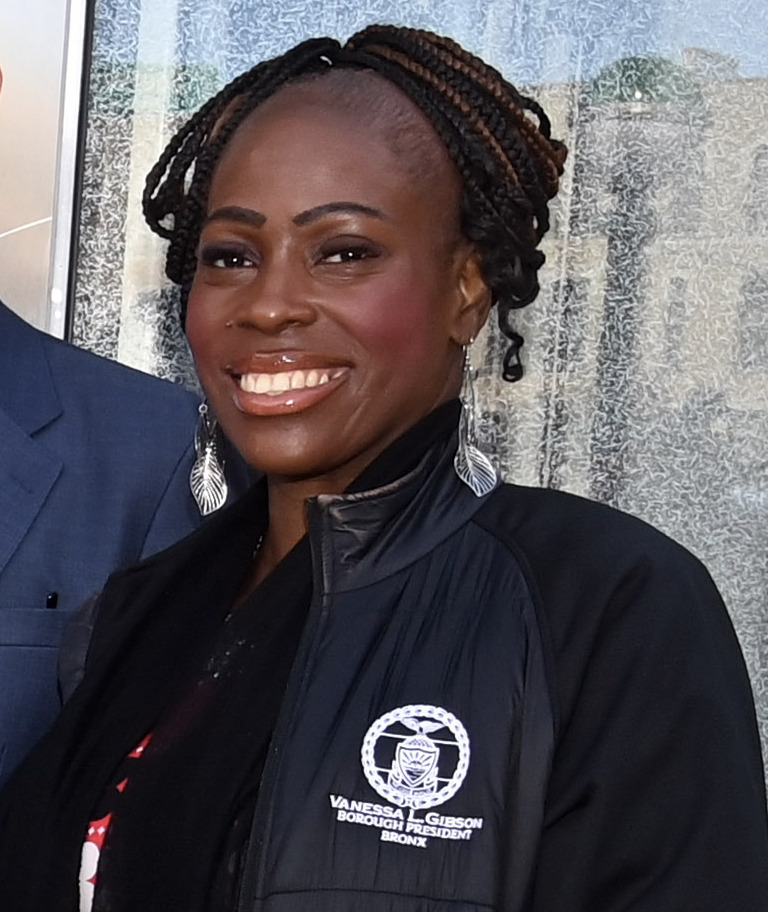
- Gibson in 2023

14th Borough President of The Bronx
- Incumbent
- Assumed office January 1, 2022
- Deputy: Janet A. Peguero (2022–2025); Vacant (2025–present)
- Preceded by: Rubén Díaz Jr.

Member of the New York City Council from the 16th district
- In office January 1, 2014 – December 31, 2021
- Preceded by: Helen Foster
- Succeeded by: Althea Stevens

Member of the New York State Assembly from the 77th district
- In office June 16, 2009 – August 31, 2013
- Preceded by: Aurelia Greene
- Succeeded by: Latoya Joyner

Personal details
- Born: March 19, 1979 (age 47) New York City, U.S.
- Party: Democratic
- Education: University at Albany (BA); Baruch College (MPA)
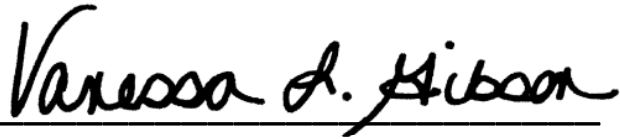
- Signature

Vanessa L. Gibson (born March 19, 1979) is an American politician who has served as the Borough President of The Bronx since 2022. She served as a member of the New York City Council, representing the 16th district from 2014 to 2021. A Democrat, she was elected Bronx Borough President in November 2021 to a four-year term beginning January 2022, running on a platform focused on recovery from COVID-19 impact, food insecurity and housing instability. She is the first female and first African American Bronx Borough President.

== Life and career ==
Gibson is a lifelong resident of New York City and was raised in Bedford–Stuyvesant. She graduated from Murry Bergtraum High School in 1997 and went on to earn a bachelor's degree in sociology from the State University of New York at Albany in May 2001. Gibson received a M.P.A. from Baruch College (City University of New York) in May 2009.

In her senior year of undergraduate studies, Gibson interned for Assemblywoman Aurelia Greene. Two years later, in November 2003, Gibson was promoted to the District Manager for Greene's 77th District. She was subsequently elected to the New York State Assembly in a June 2009 special election. Her assumption was in succession of her mentor Greene, who had joined the cabinet of Bronx Borough President Rubén Díaz Jr. earlier that year.

== New York City Council ==
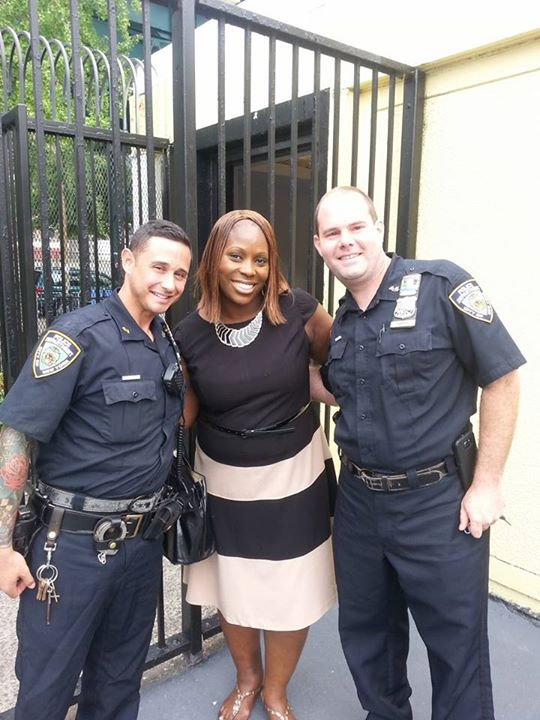
Gibson with NYPD at Mullaly Pool in the Bronx, NY, July 2015

On November 5, 2013, Gibson successfully ran for New York City Council after winning a fairly contentious primary election. Within her district, Gibson is particularly adamant about eliminating homelessness and hunger. Gibson held Annual Housing Conferences to solidify the relationship between landlords and tenants in District 16. She held free meal events to feed the children of the South Bronx, and designated much of her district's budget allocation towards the schools and senior homes within her district.

While working at the city council, Gibson used her influence to escape penalties from a traffic ticket she received from a police officer for using her cellphone while driving in 2014. The officer who wrote her the ticket later sued the NYPD for $75 million after her supervisor insisted she void the ticket after talking to Gibson. Gibson later paid a $5,000 fine in connection with the incident and admitted to violating a section of the City Charter that forbids elected officials from using their positions for personal advantage.

Gibson worked as chairperson to the council's public safety committee, which is among bodies charged with oversight of the New York Police Department (NYPD). In the wake of public outrage over the deaths of civilians such as Eric Garner, she assured the public through various media outlets that she would rectify the NYPD transparency system and better equip officers for public service. She worked with Mayor Bill de Blasio, Council Speaker Melissa Mark-Viverito, and the Civilian Complaint Review Board (CCRB) to implement the use of body worn cameras, GPS tracking devices for officers, and technological advancement funding for the NYPD.

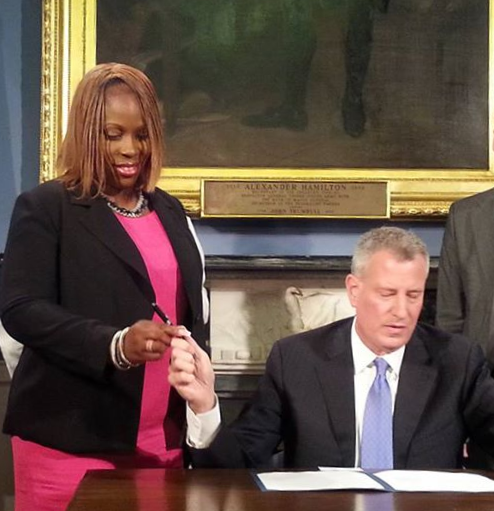
Gibson with Mayor Bill de Blasio during the Legionnaires Bill Signing on August 18, 2015

Gibson also addressed the school-to-prison pipeline. On March 31, 2015, Gibson introduced an amendment to the 2011 Student Safety Act. The bill, Intro 0730-2015, co-sponsored by Council Member Corey Johnson, was designed to mandate the release of school disciplinary activity on the Department of Education's website. The amendment also called for statistical data of student arrests to be reported to the NYC Council. Intro 730 was signed into law on October 13, 2015. It was the first New York City law to be introduced to the NYC Council by Council Member Gibson.

Gibson responded to the 2015 Bronx Legionnaires' disease outbreaks that primarily plagued her constituents. She worked with Mayor Bill de Blasio, Speaker Melissa Mark-Viverito, Bronx Borough President Rubén Díaz Jr., the Department of Health and Mental Hygiene (DOHMH), among many other New York City authorities to investigate the cause of the outbreak and implement prophylactic legislation accordingly. On August 18, 2015, Gibson stood alongside the Mayor as he signed Local Law 866 (Int 0866-2015), a historical legislation that mandates cooling tower registration and regulates the maintenance of citywide towers.

Gibson secured $25M for Grant Park, $4.6M for Bridge Playground, $4M for Corporal Fischer Park, and supported a $100M renovation of the Bronx's only state park, Roberto Clemente State Park.

== Election history ==
Election history
Location	Year	Election	Results
NY Assembly District 77	2009	Special	√ Vanessa Gibson (D) 74.92% Joel Rivera (Conservative) 21.12% Barbara Bowland (R) 3.97%
NY Assembly District 77	2010	General	√ Vanessa Gibson (D) 95.83% Tanya Carmichael (R) 2.83% Robert Marrero (Conservative) 1.16%
NY Assembly District 77	2012	Democratic Primary	√ Vanessa Gibson 89.94% Anthony Curry 9.80%
NY Assembly District 77	2012	General	√ Vanessa Gibson (D) 97.74% Tanya Carmichael (R) 1.73% Devon Morrison (Conservative) .52%
NYC Council District 16	2013	Democratic Primary	√ Vanessa Gibson 44.15% Pedro Alvarez 16.77% Carlos Sierra 14.36% Daryl L. Johnson 7.70% Naaimat Muhammed 6.55% Carlton Berkley 5.87% Bola Omotosho 4.62%
NYC Council District 16	2013	General	√ Vanessa Gibson (D) 91.06% Carlos Sierra (Independence) 4.33% Walter L. Newsome Jr. (Jobs & Education) 2.83% Benjamin Eggleston (R) 1.77%
NYC Council District 16	2017	General	√ Vanessa Gibson (D) 96.17% Benjamin Eggleston (R) 3.61%
Bronx Borough President	2021	General	√ Vanessa Gibson (D) 79.93% Janelle King (R) 13.41% Sammy Ravelo (Conservative) 6.52%
Bronx Borough President	2025	General	√ Vanessa Gibson (D) 83% Grace Marrero (R) 17%

New York State Assembly
Preceded by Aurelia Greene	Member of the New York Assembly from the 77th district 2009–2013	Succeeded by Latoya Joyner
Political offices
Preceded by Helen Foster	Member of the New York City Council from the 16th district 2014–2021	Succeeded by Althea Stevens
Preceded by Rubén Díaz Jr.	Borough President of The Bronx; 2022–present	Incumbent
