= Seymour Boyers =

American politician (1926–2019)

Member of the New York State Assembly from the 24th district
- In office January 1, 1967 – December 31, 1968
- Preceded by: Moses M. Weinstein
- Succeeded by: Arthur J. Cooperman

Member of the New York City Council from the Queens at-large district
- In office January 1, 1964 – December 31, 1965
- Preceded by: District created
- Succeeded by: Michael J. Lazar

Member of the New York City Council from the 5th district
- In office January 1, 1962 – December 31, 1963
- Preceded by: Maurice T. O'Brien
- Succeeded by: Matthew Troy

Personal details
- Born: October 9, 1926 Queens, New York City, New York, U.S.
- Died: January 7, 2019 (aged 92) Queens, New York City, New York, U.S.
- Party: Democratic

Seymour Boyers (October 9, 1926 – January 7, 2019) was an American politician and lawyer who served in the New York City Council from 1962 to 1965 and in the New York State Assembly from the 24th district from 1967 to 1968.

He co-sponsored the 1965 Landmarks Preservation Bill, which significantly increased the power of the New York City Landmarks Preservation Commission.

== Personal life and death ==
Boyers attended Samuel J. Tilden High School, from which he graduated in 1945. He served in the US Army from 1945 to 1947. He obtained a bachelor's degree from Syracuse University and attended Columbia University Teacher's College from 1952 to 1953. He also earned a law degree from the New York University School of Law.

He died on January 7, 2019, in Queens, New York City, New York at 92. He was Jewish.
