= Barry Salman =

American politician

Member of the New York City Council from the 9th district
- In office January 1, 1974 – December 31, 1977
- Preceded by: Michael DeMarco
- Succeeded by: Wendell Foster

Member of the New York City Council from the 11th district
- In office March 13, 1970 – December 31, 1973
- Preceded by: Lawrence H. Bernstein
- Succeeded by: Ramon S. Velez

Personal details
- Born: May 20, 1940 (age 84); The Bronx, New York City, New York
- Political party: Democratic

Barry Salman (born May 20, 1940) is an American politician who served in the New York City Council 1970 to 1977.
