= Taqwa Community Farm =

Community garden in the Bronx, New York

Coordinates: 40.832659°N 73.929094°W

- Interactive map of Taqwa Community Farm
- Type: Community garden
- Location: The Bronx, New York City
- Created: 1992; 34 years ago
- Founder: Abu Talib

Taqwa Community Farm is a 1/2-acre (0.20 ha) park operated as a community garden in the Highbridge neighborhood of the Bronx, New York City.

== History ==
Raised in South Carolina to a family of sharecroppers, Abu Talib sought to transform a vacant site in one of the city’s most impoverished neighborhoods into a vibrant center of activity through his experience in farming. Surrounded by private homes, this property was formerly occupied by an apartment building which became a victim of urban decay in the 1970s. Later the building was demolished, leaving an abandoned city-owned lot. In 1992, a group of neighborhood residents, led by Talib, received permission from the city to garden the vacant lot at 164th Street and Ogden Avenue, and founded the Taqwa Community Farm. Its name Taqwa, Arabic for “the peace,” is derived from the Muslim term for a conscious recognition of God. The garden was assigned to the Parks Department in 1998, ensuring that it will remain secure as a public green space. Also in 1998, the work of the garden’s volunteers earned Taqwa the Deere Kids Seeds of Hope Award.

Tended by volunteers from nearly 100 families, the garden grows potatoes, spinach, string beans, collards, carrots, squash, peas, cabbage and corn, among other vegetables. Today, Taqwa yields about 10,000 pounds of food annually. It has a colony of bees and a dozen chickens. The garden sell products at local farmers markets and through their "Grow to Give" program donate any leftover produce.

== See also ==
- Community Gardens in New York City
- Community gardening in the United States
