= Harlem Heights (TV series) =

- Starring: Ashlie Gray; Briana Bigham; Bridget Bland; Brooke Crittendon; Christian Grant-Fields; Jason Allen; Landon Dais; Pierre Downing
- Country of origin: United States
- Original language: English
- No. of episodes: 10

Production
- Running time: 20-21 minutes (excluding commercials)

Original release
- Network: BET
- Release: March 2 – April 20, 2009

Harlem Heights is a BET reality television series. It documents the lives of eight trendy African-American 20-somethings as they navigated through relationships and their professional lives. The series aired Mondays on BET. Along with fellow reality series College Hill and Baldwin Hills, Harlem Heights was discontinued as BET shifted to scripted programs.

== Cast ==
=== Main ===
- Ashlie Gray, an actress
- Briana Bigham, Bridget's cousin. She has been a designer in the New York fashion industry for 8 years and has a line of handbags called "B. Marie".
- Bridget Bland, Briana's cousin, entertainment Writer and law Student, graduate of Spelman College. Member of Alpha Kappa Alpha sorority.
- Brooke Crittendon, MTV Producer and Kanye West's ex-girlfriend. Member of Delta Sigma Theta sorority.
- Christian Grant-Fields, lifestyle editor for Dime magazine
- Jason Allen, founder of a non-profit organization for kids
- Landon Dais, Morehouse College graduate and a member of Phi Beta Sigma fraternity. Landon is running for New York City Council (9th District Central Harlem / Morningside Heights).
- Pierre Downing, a college basketball player with a tough background

=== Recurring ===
- Ally, a common friend

== Episodes ==
No.	Title	Original release date	Prod. code
1	"Harlem Heights"	March 2, 2009	101
The gang votes in the 2008 presidential election.
2	"Carrying the Torch"	March 2, 2009	102
The gang goes out to celebrate the election results. Meanwhile, Ashlie and Brooke catch up with friends while Christian and Pierre get into a bit of trouble.
3	"Handling Their Business"	March 9, 2009	103
Christian and Ashlie go out on a date and Jason attempts to start his nonprofit organization. Briana tries to further her career and elsewhere, Pierre and Brooke have dinner together.
4	"Mind Games"	March 16, 2009	104
Bridget goes to an African American theater fund raiser and afterwards asks a friend about her behavior. Pierre is still adjusting to life in the Heights and things are awkward between Ashlie and Christian when they go on a double date.
5	"Partied Out"	March 23, 2009	105
Pierre pays his family a visit in his old neighborhood, and Briana is nervous about her upcoming preview showcase. Meanwhile, Ashlie tries to evaluate her feelings for Christian although he's out partying with Brooke.
6	"Choose a Side!"	March 30, 2009	106
Controversy arises from a kiss between Brooke and Christian. Jason continues his work on starting his non-profit organization. Brooke finds herself having a pair of heated confrontations at an open-mike event.
7	"Complicating Matters"	April 7, 2009	107
Brooke and Ashlie address their conflict; Christian deals with his feelings for Brooke; Pierre has a confrontation at a dinner party; and Ashlie prepares to set the record straight with Landon.
8	"Big Plans"	April 14, 2009	108
Brooke is offended by a comment from Landon; Pierre and Bridget grow closer; Landon plans for the future; and Kelli C. interrupts a big moment between Christian and Brooke.
9	"Good Deeds"	April 20, 2009	109
While awaiting a commitment from Brooke, Christian plays the field. Elsewhere, the girls come together for a PSA; Bridget's birthday party finds Christian getting in trouble; and Brianna finds herself stressed out by an upcoming fashion show.
10	"Politicking"	April 20, 2009	110
The season 1 finale finds the launch of Briana's bag. Elsewhere, Jason continues promoting his non-profit organization; Ashlie heads to LA to meet up with an established acting coach; Landon seeks his father's approval; and Brooke makes a decision regarding Christian.
