= Rubén Díaz Jr. =

American politician (born 1973)

Rubén Díaz
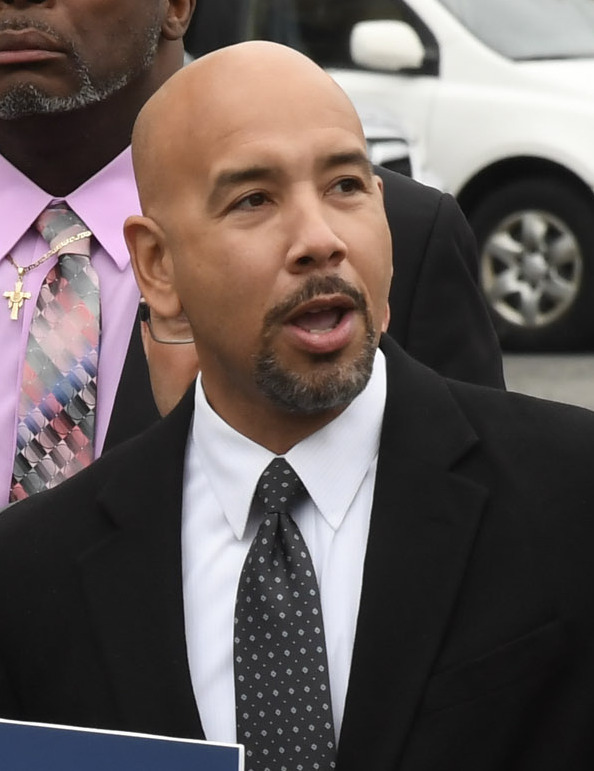
- Díaz in 2019

13th Borough President of The Bronx
- In office April 22, 2009 – December 31, 2021
- Preceded by: Adolfo Carrión Jr.
- Succeeded by: Vanessa Gibson

Member of the New York State Assembly
- In office January 1, 1997 – April 22, 2009
- Preceded by: Pedro Espada
- Succeeded by: Marcos Crespo
- Constituency: 75th district (1997–2002); 85th district (2003–2009)

Personal details
- Born: April 26, 1973 (age 53) New York City, U.S.
- Party: Democratic
- Relatives: Rubén Díaz (father)
- Education: LaGuardia Community College; City University of New York, Lehman (BA)

Rubén Díaz Jr. (born April 26, 1973) is an American politician who served as the 13th borough president of The Bronx in New York City from 2009 to 2021. He was elected in April 2009 and reelected in 2013 and 2017. He previously served in the New York State Assembly.

== Early life and education ==
Díaz's parents are Nuyoricans, New Yorkers who moved from Puerto Rico. Díaz was born in the Bronx, where he received his primary and secondary education. He graduated first from LaGuardia Community College, then Lehman College with a bachelor's degree in political theory. Díaz's father, Rubén Díaz, is a former New York City Councilman and a former member of the New York State Senate.

== Career ==
=== New York State Assembly ===
Díaz was elected to the New York State Assembly at the age of twenty-three, which made him the youngest person elected to the legislative body since Theodore Roosevelt.

While in the Assembly, Díaz sponsored, co-sponsored and passed legislation addressing health care, public records access, minimum wage and overtime pay, environmental protection, equitable labor standards, insurance fraud, tenants rights, transparency and disclosure in all environmental impact statements, pedestrian safety, school bus safety, protection from tax preparers, Senior Citizens rights, wider access to the Senior Citizens Rent Increase Exemption (SCRIE) Program, and the regulation and accountability of gas and electric companies.

A member of the Assembly Education Committee, Díaz has been outspoken on educational issues. He has addressed the International Democratic Education Conference (IDEC) and praised the Campaign for Fiscal Equity's (CFE) efforts to protect the constitutional right to a basic education. In 2003, when Governor George Pataki sought to cut the State's higher education budget, Díaz was a vocal critic of this plan and, together with other state legislators, was able to restore funding for some of the Governor's proposed cuts.

Díaz has legislated on behalf of Brownfield Cleanup and Green Roof Tax Abatement, worked to restore the Bronx River which runs through the 85th Assembly District, and opposed environmental racism.

In September 2007, he was named one of City Hall's "40 under 40" for being a young influential member of New York City politics.

==== Amadou Diallo ====
On February 4, 1999, Amadou Diallo, a young African immigrant, was killed by four New York City police officers who fired 41 unanswered rounds at him. Since the shooting occurred in his South Bronx district, Díaz became an advocate and organizer for the Diallo family. Through a series of public appearances, hearings, press conferences and massive public demonstrations, Díaz led a citywide protest which drew national media attention. Díaz marched together with Rev. Al Sharpton, the Rev. Jesse Jackson, actress Susan Sarandon, dozens of rabbis and other clergy, and was arrested for his peaceful protest. As a result, Díaz became known for his support of civil and human rights.

==== The Rainbow Rebels ====
In summer 2008, Díaz became a founding member of a progressive civic and political group known as the "Rainbow Rebels", who achieved sudden and widespread popularity throughout the Bronx County of New York.

On August 22, 2008, the Rainbow Rebels made their first official announcement: Díaz joined with two of his Assembly colleagues Carl Heastie and Michael Benjamin, both Democratic African Americans, and with Assemblyman Jeffrey Dinowitz of Riverdale and his powerful Benjamin Franklin Reform Democratic Club, to promote the candidacy of Elizabeth Taylor for a Civil Court judgeship. On September 9, 2008, Taylor won the Democratic primary for the judgeship, despite opposition from the Bronx County Leader, Jose Rivera, and the Bronx political machine known as "County".

On September 28, 2008, at the Bronx County Committee meeting, the Rainbow Rebels won another significant victory by replacing the Bronx County Leader José Rivera with Assemblyman Carl Heastie.

=== Bronx Borough President ===
On February 18, 2009, U.S. President Barack Obama appointed Bronx borough president Adolfo Carrión Jr. to the position of Director of the White House Office on Urban Affairs. When Mayor Michael Bloomberg declared a special election to choose his successor, Díaz was considered the leading candidate for the position.

The special election was held on April 21, 2009. Díaz defeated the Republican Party candidate Anthony Ribustello with an overwhelming 87% of the vote, to become the 13th borough president of the Bronx.

On July 1, 2009, Díaz appointed Delores Fernandez to the reconstituted New York City Board of Education. Fernandez is anticipated to be the sole member of the Board who will have a perspective independent of the mayor, Michael Bloomberg. Díaz ended his first summer as borough president by recommending that the New York City Council reject Related Companies' proposal to turn the Kingsbridge Armory into a shopping mall. In an editorial in the New York Daily News, Díaz wrote that he is "fighting to make sure that this development includes 'living wage' jobs that offer health insurance".

In 2017, Díaz won the Democratic primary for borough president with 86% of the vote. On the same day, his father won the Democratic primary to return to the City Council from the Senate.

In January 2020, Díaz announced that he would not seek re-election in 2021.

=== New York City mayoral campaign ===
In 2018, Diaz was the first candidate to file to run in the 2021 New York City mayoral election. Diaz dropped out in January 2020, saying he wanted to spend more time with his family.

== Personal life ==
Díaz lives in the southeast Bronx. He and his wife Hilda have two adult sons.

== See also ==
- Timeline of the Bronx, 21st c.
- Paterson, David "Black, Blind, & In Charge: A Story of Visionary Leadership and Overcoming Adversity."Skyhorse Publishing. New York, New York, 2020

New York State Assembly
Preceded by Pedro Espada	Member of the New York State Assembly from the 75th district 1997–2002	Succeeded by Richard Gottfried
Preceded by Ronald Tocci	Member of the New York State Assembly from the 85th district 2003–2009	Succeeded by Marcos Crespo
Political offices
Preceded by Adolfo Carrión Jr.	Borough President of The Bronx; 2009–2021	Succeeded by Vanessa Gibson
