= Bronx Community Board 4 =

Bronx Community District 4 Bronx Community Board 4
- Community District
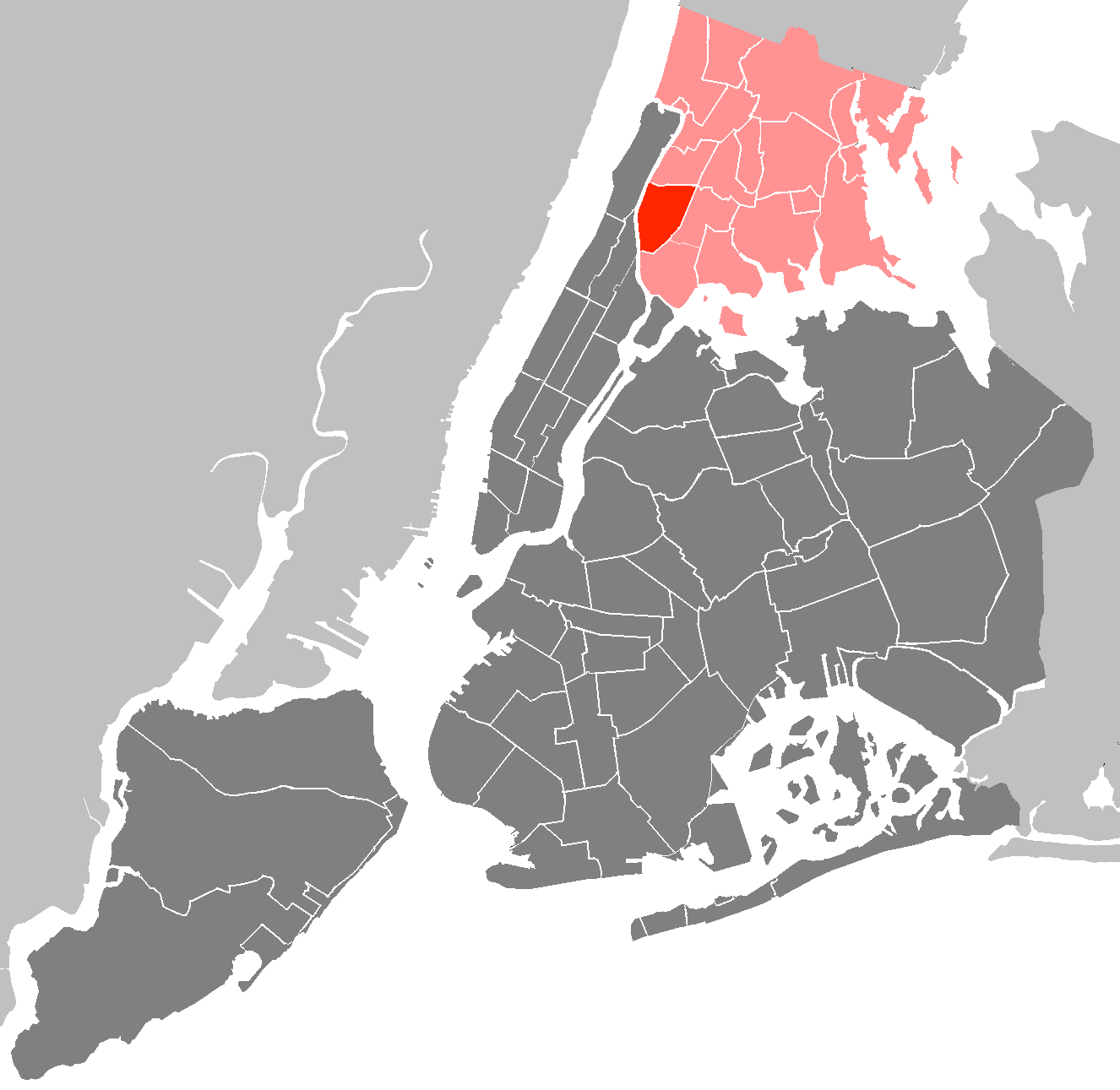
- Location in The Bronx
- Country: United States
- State: New York
- City: New York City
- Borough: The Bronx
- Neighborhoods: list: Concourse; Highbridge; Mount Eden, Bronx

Government
  - Type: Community board
  - Body: Bronx Community Board 4
  - Chairperson: Kathleen Saunders
  - District Manager: Paul A. Philips

Area
  - Total: 2.0 sq mi (5.2 km^{2})

Population (2010)
  - Total: 146,441
  - Density: 73,000/sq mi (28,000/km^{2})

Ethnicity
  - Hispanic and Latino Americans: 58.4%
  - African-American: 36.1%
  - White: 1.4%
  - Asian: 1.4%
  - Others: 0.6%
  - American Indian or Alaska Native: 0.4%
- Time zone: UTC−5 (Eastern)
  - Summer (DST): UTC−4 (EDT)
- ZIP codes: 10451, 10452, and 10456
- Area codes: 718, 347, and 929, and 917
- Police Precincts: 44th (website)
- Website: www1.nyc.gov/site/bronxcb4/index.page

Bronx Community Board 4 is a local government unit of the City of New York, encompassing the neighborhoods of Mount Eden, Highbridge and Concourse. It is delimited by Webster Avenue and Park Avenue to the east, Washington Bridge and the Cross Bronx Expressway to the north, the Harlem River to the west, and East 149th Street to the south.

== Community board staff and membership ==
The current chairperson of the Bronx Community board 4 is Martha Reyes.

The City Council members representing the community district are non-voting, ex officio board members. The council members and their council districts are:

- 8th NYC Council District - Diana Ayala
- 16th NYC Council District - Althea Stevens
- 17th NYC Council District - Rafael Salamanca

== Demographics ==
As of the United States 2010 Census, the Community Board has a population of 146,441, up from 119,962 in 1990 and 114,309 in 1980. Of them, 81,505 (58.4%) are of Hispanic origin, 50,416 (36.1%) are Black, non-Hispanic, 2,020 (1.4%) are White, non-Hispanic, 1,984 (1.4%) are Asian or Pacific Islander, 489 (0.4%) American Indian or Alaska Native, 777 (0.6%) are some other race (non-Hispanic), and 2,372 (1.7%) of two or more races (non-Hispanic).
