= New York City's 16th City Council district =

- Boundaries following the 2020 census

Government
  - Councilmember: Althea Stevens (D—Concourse)

Population (2010)
  - Total: 176,956

Demographics
  - Hispanic: 58%
  - Black: 39%
  - White: 1%
  - Asian: 1%
  - Other: 2%

Registration
  - Democratic: 78.3%
  - Republican: 3.8%
  - No party preference: 15.3%
- Registered voters (2021) 100,060

New York City's 16th City Council district is one of 51 districts in the New York City Council. It is currently represented by Democrat Althea Stevens, who took office in 2022.

== Geography ==
District 16 covers a series of neighborhoods in the South Bronx, including parts of Concourse, Morrisania, Highbridge, Morris Heights, and Tremont. Yankee Stadium is located within the district.

The district overlaps with Bronx Community Boards 3, 4, and 5, and is contained almost entirely within New York's 15th congressional district, with a small extension into the 13th district. It also overlaps with the 29th, 32nd, and 33rd districts of the New York State Senate, and with the 77th, 79th, 84th, and 86th districts of the New York State Assembly.

== Recent election results ==
=== 2025 ===
2025 New York City Council election, District 16
Primary election
Party	Candidate	Votes	%
Democratic	Althea Stevens (incumbent)	7,243	70.9
Democratic	Shakur Joseph	2,867	28.1
Write-in		105	1.0
Total votes		10,215	100.0
General election
Democratic	Althea Stevens	16,562	
Working Families	Althea Stevens	1,740	
Total	Althea Stevens (incumbent)	18,302	88.4
Republican	Emmanuel Findlay Jr.	1,947	
Conservative	Emmanuel Findlay Jr.	410	
Total	Emmanuel Findlay Jr.	2,357	11.4
Write-in		38	0.2
Total votes		20,697	100.0
Democratic hold			

=== 2023 (redistricting) ===
Due to redistricting and the 2020 changes to the New York City Charter, councilmembers elected during the 2021 and 2023 City Council elections will serve two-year terms, with full four-year terms resuming after the 2025 New York City Council elections.

2023 New York City Council election, District 16
Party	Candidate	Votes	%
Democratic	Althea Stevens (incumbent)	4,384	85.4
Republican	Tanya Carmichael	702	13.7
Write-in		50	0.9
Total votes		5,136	100.0
Democratic hold			

=== 2021 ===
In 2019, voters in New York City approved Ballot Question 1, which implemented ranked-choice voting in all local elections. Under the new system, voters have the option to rank up to five candidates for every local office. Voters whose first-choice candidates fare poorly will have their votes redistributed to other candidates in their ranking until one candidate surpasses the 50 percent threshold. If one candidate surpasses 50 percent in first-choice votes, then ranked-choice tabulations will not occur.

An interactive map of District 16

2021 New York City Council election, District 16
Primary election
Party	Candidate	Votes	%
Democratic	Althea Stevens	5,125	50.7
Democratic	Ahmadou Diallo	2,075	20.5
Democratic	Abdourahamane Diallo	2,046	20.2
Democratic	Yves Filius	795	7.9
Write-in		71	0.7
Total votes		10,112	100
General election
Democratic	Althea Stevens	10,002	90.7
Republican	Kajara Boyd	1,011	9.2
Write-in		17	0.1
Total votes		11,030	100
Democratic hold			

=== 2017 ===
2017 New York City Council election, District 16
Party	Candidate	Votes	%
Democratic	Vanessa Gibson	12,898	
Working Families	Vanessa Gibson	494	
Total	Vanessa Gibson (incumbent)	13,392	96.2
Republican	Benjamin Eggleston	413	
Conservative	Benjamin Eggleston	91	
Total	Benjamin Eggleston	504	3.6
Write-in		31	0.2
Total votes		13,927	100
Democratic hold			

=== 2013 ===
2013 New York City Council election, District 16
Primary election
Party	Candidate	Votes	%
Democratic	Vanessa Gibson	4,561	44.1
Democratic	Pedro Alvarez	1,732	16.8
Democratic	Carlos Sierra	1,483	14.4
Democratic	Daryl Johnson	795	7.7
Democratic	Naaimat Muhammed	677	6.6
Democratic	Carlton Berkley	606	5.9
Democratic	Bola Omotosho	477	4.6
Write-in		1	0.0
Total votes		10,332	100
General election
Democratic	Vanessa Gibson	12,514	91.1
Independence	Carlos Sierra	595	4.3
Jobs & Education	Walter Newsome	389	2.8
Republican	Benjamin Eggleston	188	
Conservative	Benjamin Eggleston	55	
Total	Benjamin Eggleston	243	1.8
Write-in		2	0.0
Total votes		13,743	100
Democratic hold			
