= Highbridge, Bronx =

Neighborhood in New York City

Highbridge
- Neighborhood of the Bronx
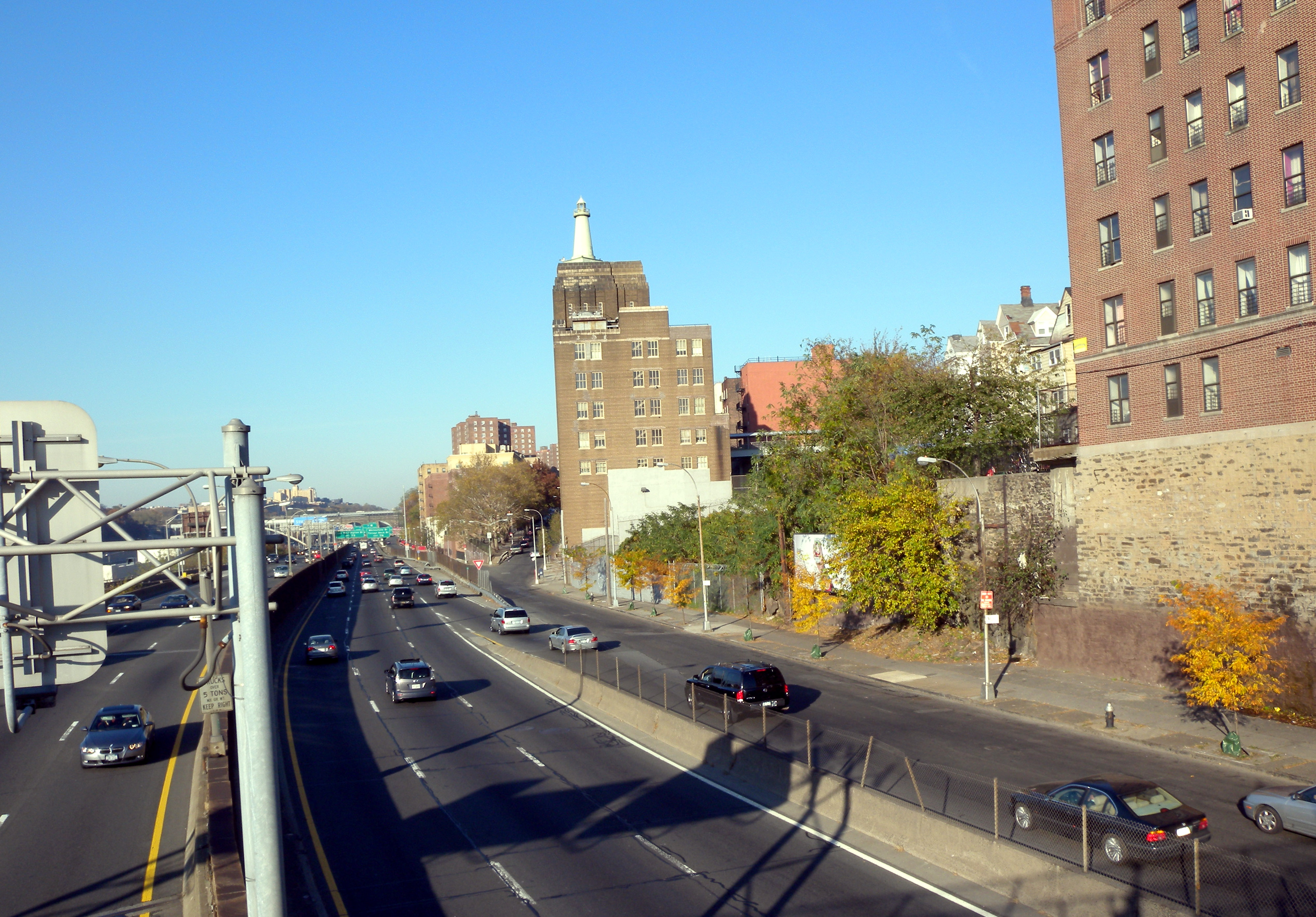
- Looking north from 161st Street pedestrian overpass at Major Deegan Expressway
- Interactive map of Highbridge
- Coordinates: 40.837°N 73.929°W
- Country: United States
- State: New York
- City: New York City
- Borough: The Bronx
- Community District: The Bronx 4

Area
  - Total: 0.605 sq mi (1.57 km^{2})

Population (2010)
  - Total: 37,727
  - Density: 62,400/sq mi (24,100/km^{2})

Economics
  - Median income: $27,041
- ZIP Codes: 10452
- Area code: 718, 347, 929, and 917
- Website: www.highbridge.nyc

Highbridge is a residential neighborhood geographically located in the central-west section of the Bronx, New York City. Its boundaries, starting from the north and moving clockwise, are the Cross-Bronx Expressway to the north, Jerome Avenue to the east, Macombs Dam Bridge to the south, and the Harlem River to the west. Ogden Avenue runs north–south through Highbridge.

The neighborhood is part of Bronx Community Board 4, and its ZIP Code is 10452. The local subway is the IND Concourse Line (B and D trains), operating along the Grand Concourse, and the IRT Jerome Avenue Line (4 train), operating along Jerome Avenue. The area is patrolled by the New York City Police Department's 44th Precinct. NYCHA property in the area is patrolled by P.S.A. 7 at 737 Melrose Avenue in the Melrose section of the Bronx.

== History ==
At the time of European settlement, the southern Bronx was inhabited by the Siwanoy, a tribe of the Wappinger confederacy. They called the hill that is now Highbridge "Nuasin", or "the land between", for its location between the Harlem River and an estuary that formerly flowed in the area of modern-day Jerome Avenue.

The neighborhood takes its name from the High Bridge, built in 1848 by Irish immigrants. The structure originally carried Croton Aqueduct water across the Harlem River. In 1864, a walkway was built across the High Bridge. Use of the structure to deliver water to Manhattan ceased in 1949. The bridge was closed to pedestrian traffic in the early 1960s and allowed to fall into disrepair; in 2015, a reconstruction project was undertaken and completed, with the bridge opening in 2019.

In the mid-late 19th century, the area was developed as a suburban retreat for the elite, who built large homes overlooking the Harlem River. The names of these families and their estates are reflected in the names of Highbridge's north–south avenues: Ogden Avenue and Boscobel Place for William B. Ogden, Merriam Avenue for Francis W. Merriam, Anderson Avenue and Woodycrest Avenue for the Anderson family, and Shakespeare Avenue for the Shakespeare Garden on the Marcher family estate. Around the turn of the 20th century, many of these estates were subdivided for urban development, however a few older houses remain.

In the early 20th century, the neighborhood was served by the Anderson–Jerome Avenues station, which connected the New York City Subway's Ninth Avenue elevated Line with the IRT Jerome Avenue Line (4 train).

In the late 1960s, the residents of Highbridge were predominantly of Irish, Italian and Eastern European Jewish descent. Large numbers of Hispanic and African American residents have since replaced them. As of 2017, the neighborhood is undergoing gentrification.

== Demographics ==
Before the 1960s, Highbridge was a predominantly Irish American neighborhood. Today the vast majority of residents in the area are of Dominican, Puerto Rican and African American descent. Almost 40% of families live below the federal poverty line.

Based on data from the 2010 United States census, the population of Highbridge was 37,727, an increase of 3,883 (11.5%) from the 33,844 counted in 2000. Covering an area of 373.14 acres (151.00 ha), the neighborhood had a population density of 101.1 inhabitants per acre (64,700/sq mi; 25,000/km^{2}).

In 2010, the racial makeup of the neighborhood was 32.9% (12,397) African American, 1.2% (462) White, 0.2% (69) Native American, 0.5% (176) Asian, 0.0% (2) Pacific Islander, 0.3% (103) from other races, and 0.7% (253) from two or more races. Hispanic or Latino of any race were 64.3% (24,265) of the population.

The entirety of Community District 4, which comprises Highbridge and Concourse, had 155,835 inhabitants as of NYC Health's 2018 Community Health Profile, with an average life expectancy of 78.6 years. This is lower than the median life expectancy of 81.2 for all New York City neighborhoods. Most inhabitants are youth and middle-aged adults: 27% are between the ages of between 0–17, 29% between 25 and 44, and 23% between 45 and 64. The ratio of college-aged and elderly residents was lower, at 11% and 10%, respectively.

As of 2017, the median household income in Community District 4 was $30,900. In 2018, an estimated 32% of Highbridge and Concourse residents lived in poverty, compared to 25% in all of the Bronx and 20% in all of New York City. One in eight residents (13%) was unemployed, compared to 13% in the Bronx and 9% in New York City. Rent burden, or the percentage of residents who have difficulty paying their rent, is 61% in Highbridge and Concourse, compared to the boroughwide and citywide rates of 58% and 51%, respectively. Based on this calculation, as of 2018, Highbridge and Concourse are considered low-income relative to the rest of the city and not gentrifying. However, as of 2017, rents in Highbridge have risen more than any other neighborhood in New York City, at a rate of 22%.

== Land use and terrain ==
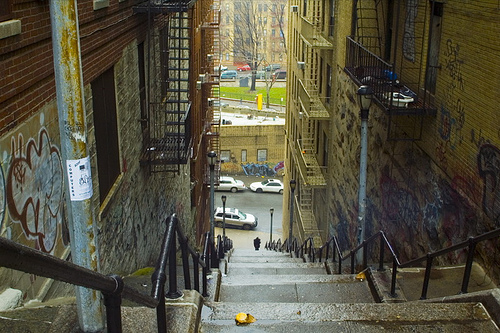
A street with steps in Highbridge

Highbridge is dominated by townhouses and 5 and 6-story apartment buildings, including numerous Art Deco landmarks built by the developer Bernard J. Noonan and the architects Horace Ginsberg and Marvin Fine. Many older detached mansions remain on Woodycrest Avenue and Ogden Avenue. The total land area is roughly one square mile. The terrain is elevated and very hilly.

Stair streets connect parts of the neighborhood at different elevations. One particular stair street between Shakespeare and Anderson Avenues became known as the "Joker Stairs", drawing tourists after the 2019 film Joker was filmed there.

=== Landmarks ===
- The Woodycrest Children's Home on Woodycrest Avenue was built as an orphanage by the American Female Guardian Society and Home for the Friendless to rescue from degradation, physical and moral, the children of want, homelessness and sorrow. This grand Beaux Arts building was designed by William Tuthill, the architect of Carnegie Hall. Opening in 1902, it housed 120 children in five dormitories, and contained a chapel, a kindergarten, a hospital, a dining room and a quarantine ward for new arrivals. The building is now managed by the Bronx-Lebanon Hospital Center as the Highbridge-Woodycrest center, providing long-term geriatric and AIDS care.
- The Art Deco style Park Plaza Apartments on Jerome Avenue, listed on the National Register of Historic Places.
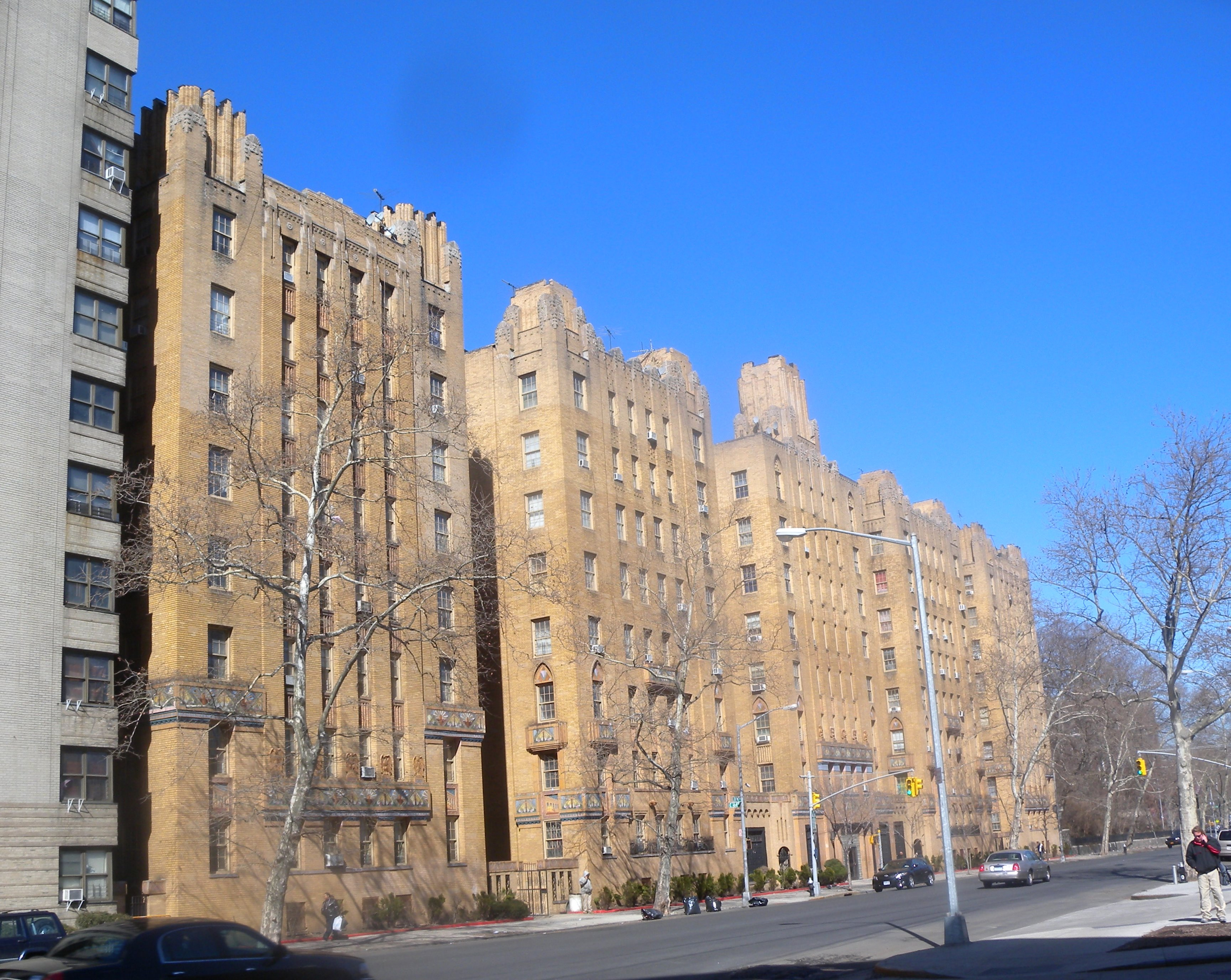
  Park Plaza Apartments, listed on the National Register of Historic Places
- The Art Deco style Noonan Plaza Apartments on West 168th Street.
- The Richardsonian Romanesque style Union Reformed Church of Highbridge on Ogden Avenue, with stained glass by Tiffany and Company.
- The Polychrome Gothic style Public School 91, now PS11, on Ogden Avenue.
- The "Lighthouse" building at Sedgewick Avenue and University Avenue has housed the H.W. Wilson Company, an educational publisher and index services provider, since 1917. The building's distinctive lighthouse was added in 1929. The company merged with EBSCO Publishing in June 2011.
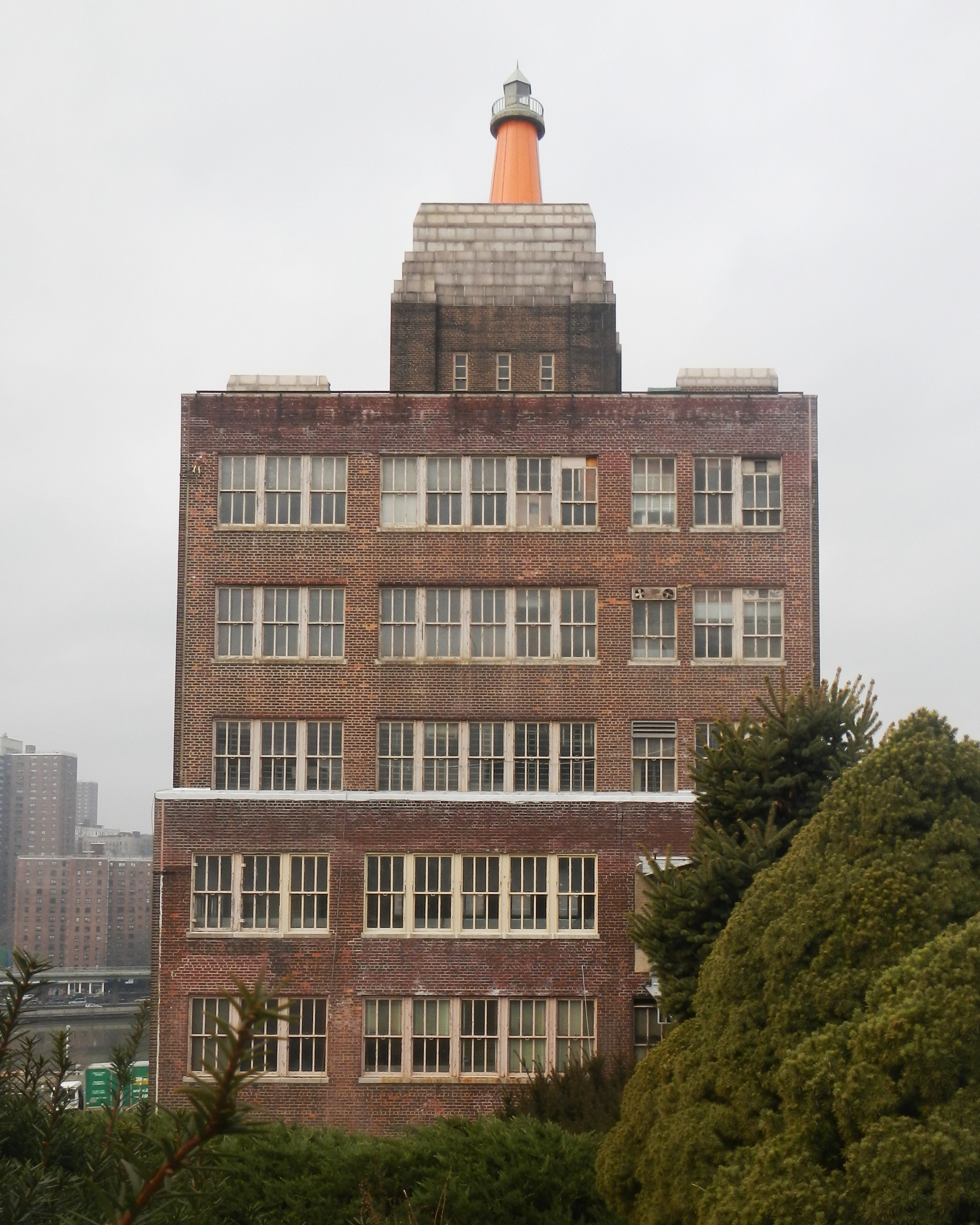
  H.W. Wilson Company "Lighthouse" Building, Highbridge

=== Parks ===
- The eponymous High Bridge, part of the former Croton Aqueduct and now a pedestrian bridge. terminates in a park in the northwest corner of the neighborhood. The High Bridge connects it to Highbridge Park in Manhattan.
- Merriam Playground
- Macombs Dam Park to the south is built in the footprint of the original Yankee Stadium.
- Mullaly Park bounds the eastern edge of the High Bridge neighborhood.
- Nelson Playground
- Corporal Irwin Fischer Park

=== Community gardens ===
The neighborhood has dozens of community gardens occupying lots that were left vacant between the 1970s and 1990s, including:

- Las Casitas Community Garden
- La Isla Garden
- Mosaic Success Garden
- Taqwa Community Farm
- Target Bronx Community Garden, renovated by the New York Restoration Project
- Woodycrest Community Garden

=== Public housing ===
There are three NYCHA developments located in Highbridge:

- Highbridge Gardens: six, 13-story buildings.
- Highbridge Rehabs (Nelson Avenue); three, 5 and 6-story rehabilitated tenement buildings.

== Politics ==
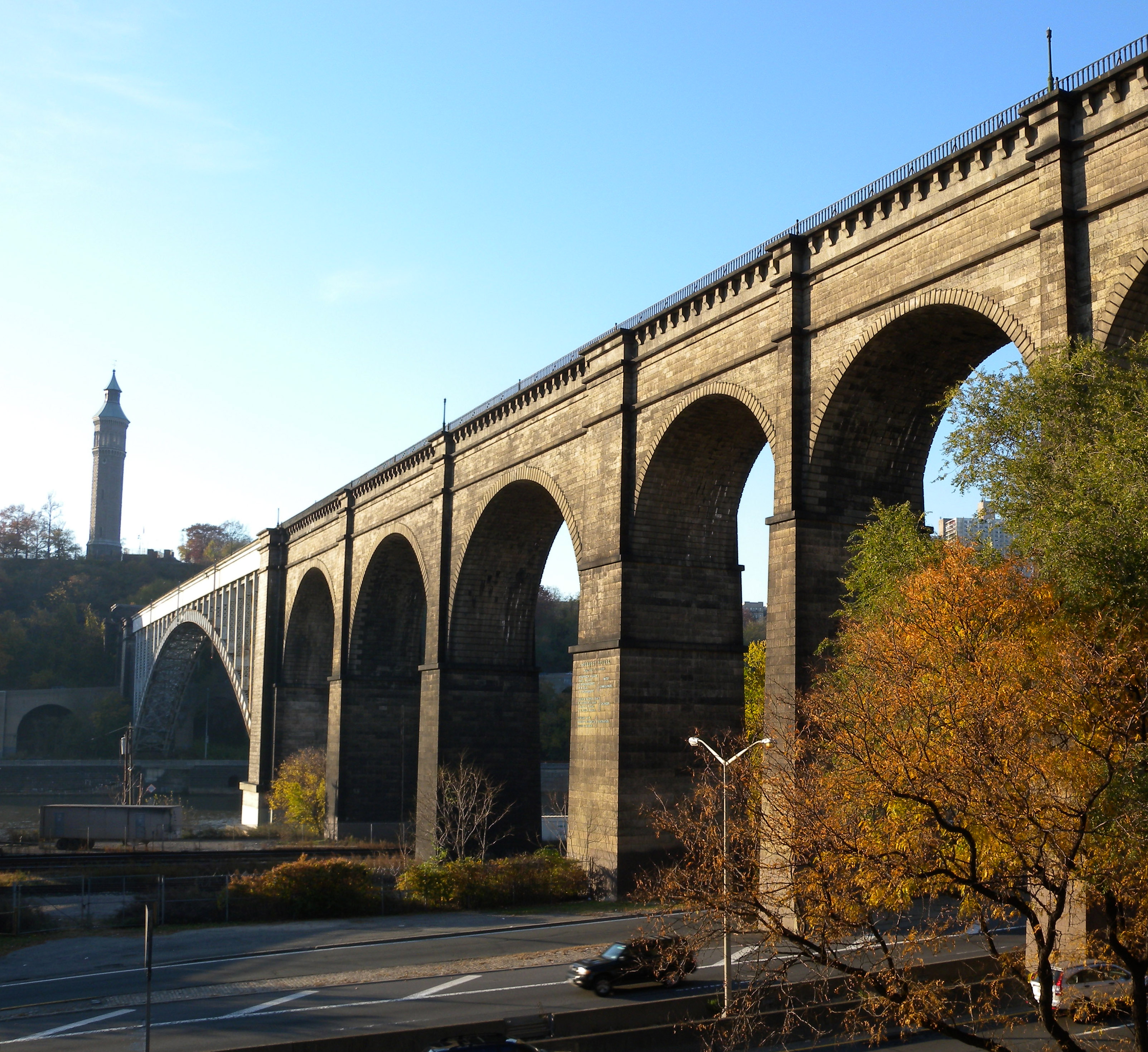
The High Bridge, part of the old Croton Aqueduct

Highbridge is part of New York's 15th congressional district, the United States' smallest congressional district by area. The district is represented by Democrat Ritchie Torres.

Highbridge is part of New York State Senate District 29, represented by José M. Serrano. Highbridge is divided between two districts of the New York State Assembly. The 77th District is represented by Latoya Joyner, while the 84th District is represented by Carmen E. Arroyo.

Highbridge is part of the New York City Council District 8. As of 2017, it is represented by Diana Ayala.

== Police and crime ==
Highbridge and Concourse are patrolled by the 44th Precinct of the NYPD, located at 2 East 169th Street. The 44th Precinct ranked 39th safest out of 69 patrol areas for per-capita crime in 2010. As of 2018, with a non-fatal assault rate of 123 per 100,000 people, Highbridge and Concourse's rate of violent crimes per capita is greater than that of the city as a whole. The incarceration rate of 813 per 100,000 people is higher than that of the city as a whole.

The 44th Precinct has a lower crime rate than in the 1990s, with crimes across all categories having decreased by 84.7% between 1990 and 2025. The precinct reported 11 murders, 51 rapes, 552 robberies, 902 felony assaults, 386 burglaries, 850 grand larcenies, and 234 grand larcenies auto in 2025.

== Fire safety ==
High Bridge is located near two New York City Fire Department (FDNY) fire stations. Engine Co. 50/Ladder Co. 19/Battalion 26 is located at 1155 Washington Avenue, while Engine Co. 68/Ladder Co. 49 is located at 1160 Ogden Avenue.

In addition, FDNY EMS Station 17 is located at 1080 Ogden Avenue.

== Health ==
As of 2018, preterm births and births to teenage mothers are more common in Highbridge and Concourse than in other places citywide. In Highbridge and Concourse, there were 93 preterm births per 1,000 live births (compared to 87 per 1,000 citywide), and 34 births to teenage mothers per 1,000 live births (compared to 19.3 per 1,000 citywide). Highbridge and Concourse has a relatively average population of residents who are uninsured. In 2018, the uninsured rate among residents was estimated at 13%, slightly higher than the citywide rate of 12%.

The concentration of fine particulate matter, the deadliest type of air pollutant, in Highbridge and Concourse is 0.0083 milligrams per cubic metre (8.3×10^{−9} oz/ft^{3}), more than the city average. Fifteen percent of Highbridge and Concourse residents are smokers, which is higher than the city average of 14% of residents being smokers. In Highbridge and Concourse, 34% of residents are obese, 17% are diabetic, and 42% have high blood pressure—compared to the citywide averages of 24%, 11%, and 28% respectively. In addition, 23% of children are obese, compared to the citywide average of 20%.

83% of residents eat some fruits and vegetables every day, which is below the city's average of 87%. In 2018, 72% of residents described their health as "good", "very good", or "excellent", lower than the city's average of 78%. For every supermarket in Highbridge and Concourse, there are 18 bodegas.

The nearest hospital is Bronx-Lebanon Hospital Center in Claremont.

== Post office and ZIP Code ==
Highbridge is covered by ZIP Code 10452. The United States Postal Service operates the Highbridge Station post office at 1315 Inwood Avenue.

== Education ==
Highbridge and Concourse generally have a lower rate of college-educated residents than the rest of the city as of 2018. While 36% of residents age 25 and older have a college education or higher, 43% have less than a high school education, and 21% are high school graduates or have some college education. By contrast, 26% of Bronx residents and 43% of city residents have a college education or higher. The percentage of Highbridge and Concourse students excelling in math rose from 17% in 2000 to 40% in 2011, and reading achievement increased from 21% to 25% during the same time period.

Highbridge and Concourse's rate of elementary school student absenteeism is higher than that of the rest of New York City. In Highbridge and Concourse, 28% of elementary school students missed twenty or more days per school year, higher than the citywide average of 20%. Additionally, 67% of high school students in Highbridge and Concourse graduate on time, lower than the citywide average of 75%.

=== Schools ===
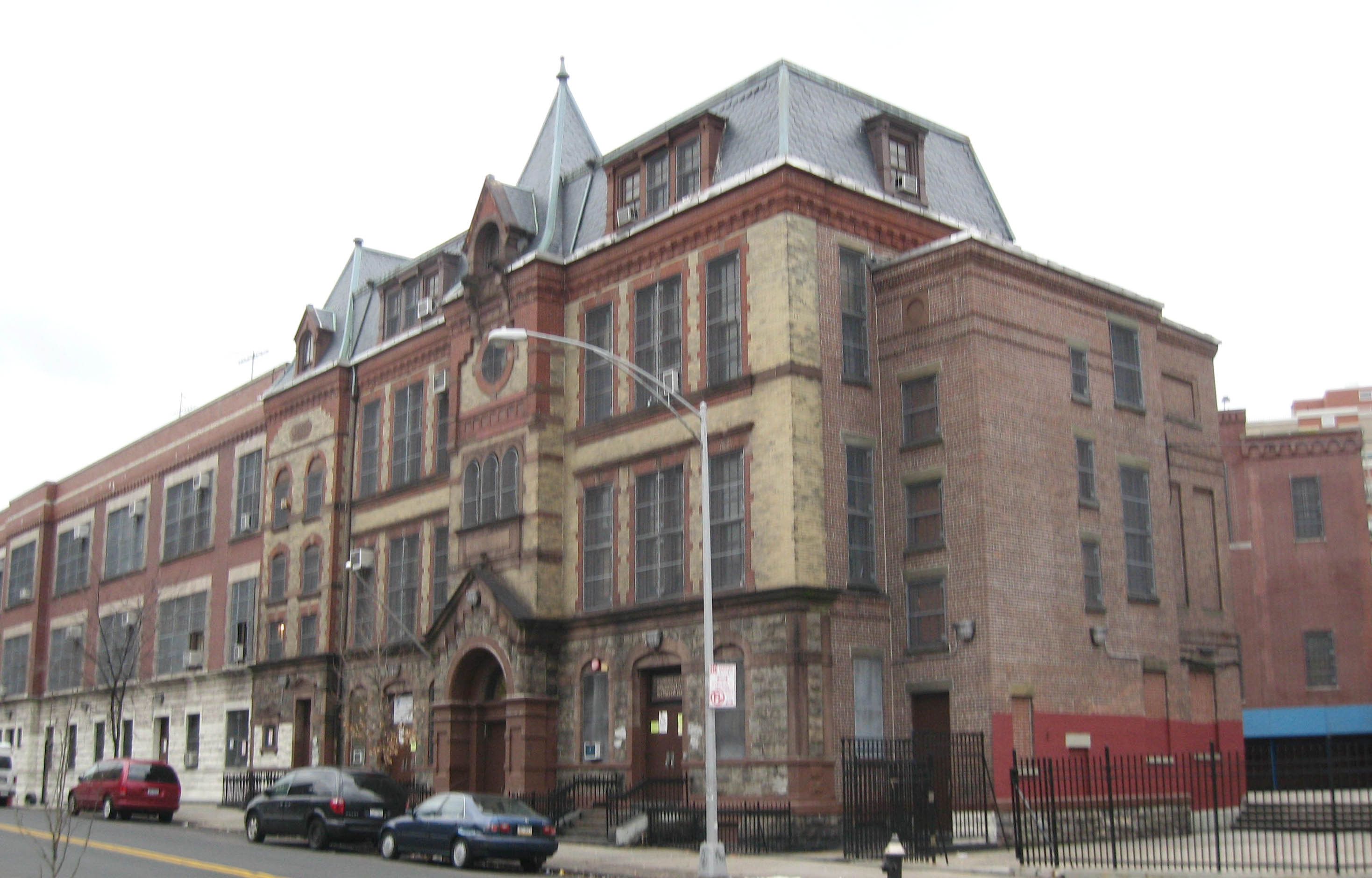
PS 11, 1257 Ogden Avenue

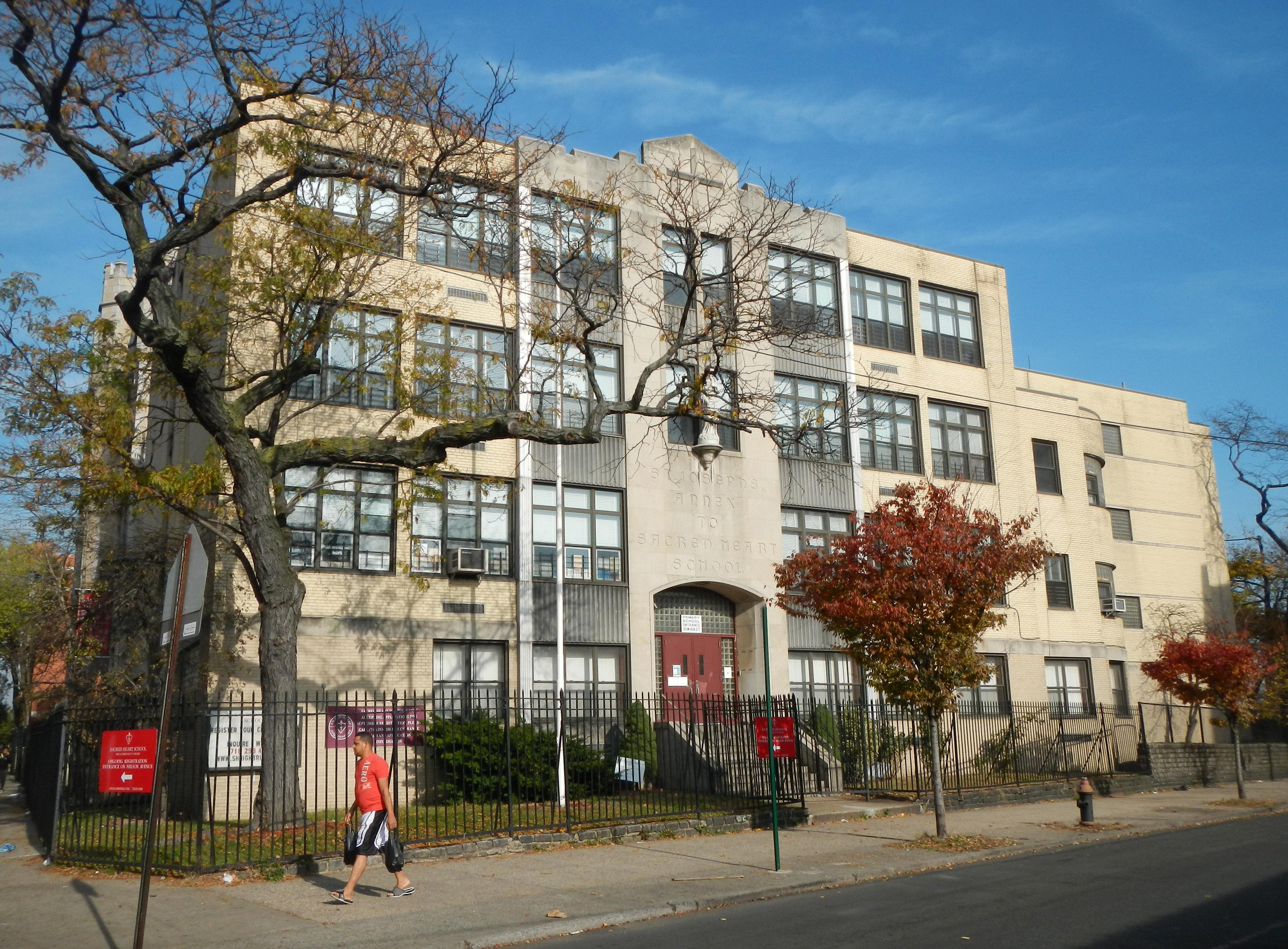
Sacred Heart School, 1248 Nelson Avenue

Public schools include:

- PS 11: High Bridge (Merriam and Ogden Avenues)
- PS 73: Joseph Dellacava (West 165th Street and Anderson Avenue)
- PS 114x: Luis Llorens Torres Schools (East 166th Street and Cromwell Avenue)
- PS 126: Dr. Marjorie Dunbar (West 166th Street and University Avenue)
- PS 199: William Shakespeare (West 172nd Street and Shakespeare Avenue)
- PS/IS 218: Rafael Hernandez Dual Language Magnet School (East 167th Street and Gerard Avenue)
- St. Joseph's of New York
- IS 361: The Highbridge Green School (200 W. 167th Street), a 2014-2015 Chancellor's Showcase School
- Bronx School for Law, Government, and Justice

Parochial schools include:

- Sacred Heart School (168th and Nelson Avenue)

=== Libraries ===
The New York Public Library (NYPL) operates two branches near Highbridge. The Grand Concourse branch is located at 155 East 173rd Street. The branch is a two-story structure that opened in 1959. The High Bridge branch is located at 78 West 168th Street. The branch was opened in the early 20th century and was renovated in 2010.

== Transportation ==
The following New York City Subway stations serve Highbridge:

- 161st Street–Yankee Stadium (4, B, and D trains)
- 167th Street (4 train)

The following MTA Regional Bus Operations bus routes serve Highbridge:

- Bx11: to Parkchester station (6 and <6> trains) or George Washington Bridge Bus Terminal (via 170th Street, Claremont Parkway, 174th Street)
- Bx13: to Bronx Terminal Market, Boricua College, or George Washington Bridge Bus Terminal (via Ogden Avenue)
- Bx18: to 170th Street station (B and D trains) (loop, via 168th Street)
- Bx35: to Crotona Park East or George Washington Bridge Bus Terminal (via 167th Street)

The Metro-North Railroad's Hudson Line also serves Highbridge at the Yankees–East 153rd Street station.

== Notable residents ==
- A Boogie wit da Hoodie (born 1995 as Artist J. Dubose), rapper and music producer
- Joy Bryant (born 1974), actress and model
- Cardi B (born 1992 as Belcalis Almanzar), rapper
- DJ Kool Herc (born 1955 as Clive Campbell), breakbeat and early hip hop disc jockey
- Don Q (rapper) (born 1990 as Le'Quincy Anderson Styles)
- Carol Lynley (1942–2019), actress and model
- Tracy Morgan (born 1968), actor and comedian
- William B. Ogden (1805–1877), railroad magnate and first mayor of Chicago
- Powerful Pex New York City Breakers (born 1967), breakdancing pioneer
- Carl Hancock Rux (writer, recording artist)
