= 2025 New York City Council election =

- November 4, 2025

All 51 seats on the New York City Council 26 seats needed for a majority
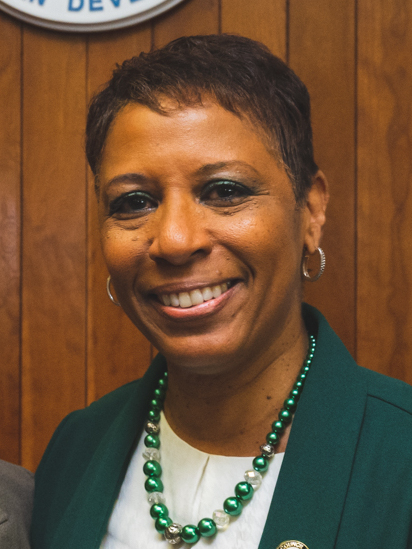

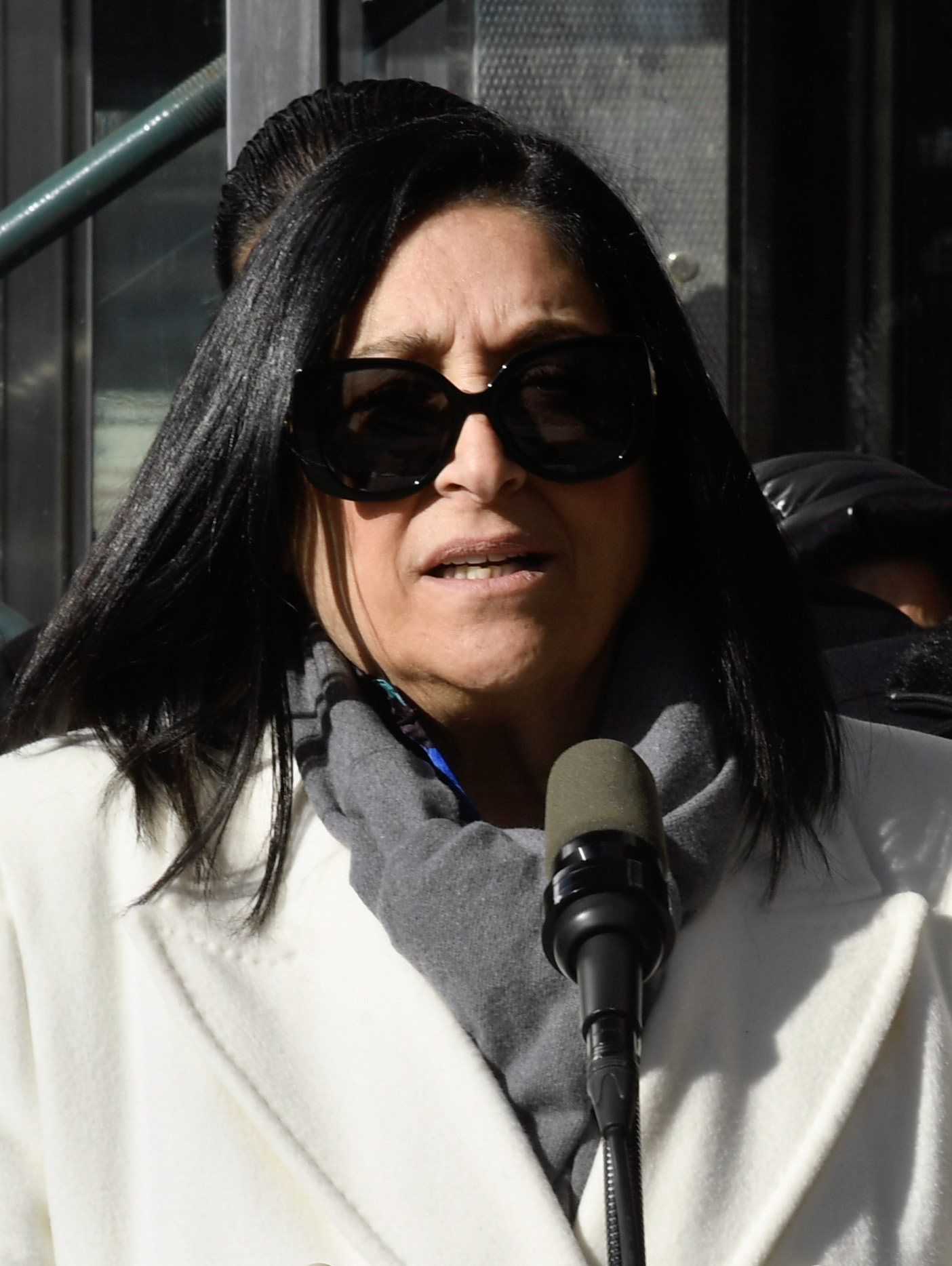
| | Majority party | Minority party |
|---|---|---|
| Leader | Adrienne Adams (term-limited) | Joann Ariola |
| Party | Democratic | Republican |
| Leader since | January 5, 2022 | February 7, 2025 |
| Leader's seat | 28th–Queens | 32nd–Queens |
| Last election | 45 seats, 75.4% | 6 seats, 24.5% |
| Seats won | 46 | 5 |
| Seat change | ▲1 | ▼1 |
| Popular vote | 1,349,186 | 354,859 |
| Percentage | 79.1% | 20.8% |
- Democratic hold Democratic gain Republican hold
Speaker before election
Adrienne Adams
Democratic
Elected Speaker
Julie Menin
Democratic

The 2025 New York City Council elections were held on November 4, 2025, with primary elections occurring on June 24, 2025. Party nominees were chosen using ranked-choice voting.

== Outgoing incumbents ==
=== Term-limited ===
Eight council members (all Democrats) were prevented from seeking a third consecutive term due to term limits that were renewed by voters in a ballot referendum in 2010.

==== Democrats ====
- 4th: Keith Powers was term-limited and ran for Manhattan borough president.
- 8th: Diana Ayala was term-limited.
- 17th: Rafael Salamanca was term-limited and ran for Bronx borough president.
- 21st: Francisco Moya was term-limited.
- 28th: Adrienne Adams was term-limited and ran for mayor.
- 30th: Robert Holden was term-limited.
- 47th: Justin Brannan was term-limited and ran for comptroller.

=== Resigned before election ===
During the 2023–2025 council session, three incumbents (two Democrats, one Republican) resigned before the election.

==== Democrats ====
- 2nd: Carlina Rivera was term-limited and resigned on August 20, 2025, to lead the New York State Association for Affordable Housing. Democrat Harvey Epstein was elected to succeed her in the regularly scheduled general election.
- 44th: Kalman Yeger resigned on December 31, 2024, after being elected to the New York State Assembly in 2024. Democrat Simcha Felder won a special election to fill his unexpired term on April 29, 2025.

==== Republican ====
- 51st: Joe Borelli resigned on January 31, 2025, to work in the private sector. Republican Frank Morano won a special election to fill his unexpired term on April 29, 2025.

=== Defeated in general election ===
One Republican incumbent was defeated in the general election.

==== Republican ====
- 13th: Kristy Marmorato lost re-election to Democrat Shirley Aldebol.

== Special elections ==
Two special elections were held during the 2025 election cycle; special elections to the council are officially non-partisan and use ranked-choice voting.

=== District 44 (special) ===
A special election to the 44th district was held on March 25 to fill the vacancy caused by Democrat Kalman Yeger's resignation to join the New York State Assembly.

==== Declared ====
- Simcha Felder, state senator from the 22nd district (2013–present) (Democratic)
- Heshy Tischler, activist and perennial candidate (Republican)

==== Withdrawn ====
- Moshe Friedman

==== Endorsements ====
Simcha Felder

State legislators

- William Colton, state assemblymember from the 47th district (1997–present)
- Simcha Eichenstein, state assemblymember from the 48th district (2019–present)
- Kalman Yeger, state assemblymember from the 41st district (2025–present)

Labor unions

- Police Benevolent Association of the City of New York

Party chapters

- Brooklyn Democratic Party

==== Results ====
2025 New York City Council special election, District 44
| Party | Candidate | Votes | % |
|---|---|---|---|
| Simcha | Simcha Felder | 4,624 | 81.7 |
| Team Trump | Heshy Tischler | 977 | 17.3 |
| Write-in | | 55 | 1.0 |
| Total votes | | 5,656 | 100.0 |

=== District 51 (special) ===
A special election to the 51st district was held on April 29 to fill the vacancy caused by Republican Joe Borelli's resignation to join the private sector.

==== Declared ====
- Griffin Fossella, son of Staten Island Borough President Vito Fossella (Republican)
- Clifford Hagen, special education teacher and environmentalist (Democratic)
- Frank Morano, radio talk show host at WABC (Republican)

==== Endorsements ====
Griffin Fossella

U.S. representatives

- Peter King, former U.S. Representative from New York's 2nd congressional district (1993–2021)

State legislators

- Louis Tobacco, former State Assemblymember from the 62nd district (2007–2012)

Local officials

- Vito Fossella, Staten Island Borough President (2022–present) (candidate's father)

Individuals

- John Catsimatidis, businessman
Clifford Hagen

Labor unions

- International Union of Elevator Constructors Local 1
- United Federation of Teachers
Frank Morano

U.S. representatives

- Nicole Malliotakis, U.S. Representative from New York's 11th congressional district (2021–present)

Local officials

- Joe Borelli, former Minority Leader of the New York City Council (2021–2025) from the 51st district (2015–2025)
- David Carr, former Minority Leader of the New York City Council (2025) from the 50th district (2021–present)
- Rudy Giuliani, former Mayor of New York City (1994–2001)
- Robert Holden, New York City Councilmember from the 30th district (2018–present) (Democratic)
- Vickie Paladino, Minority Whip of the New York City Council (2025–present) from the 19th district (2022–present)
- Inna Vernikov, former Minority Whip of the New York City Council (2022–2025) from the 48th district (2021–present)

Individuals

- John Avlon, journalist and board chair of Citizens Union (Democratic)
- Steve Bannon, former White House chief strategist (2017) and former executive chair of Breitbart News
- Roger Stone, political consultant and lobbyist

Labor unions

- Seafarers International Union of North America

Organizations

- Citizens Union
- New York Young Republican Club
- Staten Island Conservative Party
- Staten Island Republican Party
Declined to endorse

Local officials

- Joann Ariola, Minority Leader of the New York City Council (2025–present) from the 32nd district (2022–present)

==== Results ====
2025 New York City Council 51st district special election
| Party | Candidate | Votes | % |
|---|---|---|---|
| SI Patriotism | Frank Morano | 5,580 | 59.2 |
| Common Ground | Clifford Hagen | 1,961 | 20.8 |
| We The People | Griffin Fossella | 1,866 | 19.8 |
| Write-in | | 27 | 0.3 |
| Total votes | | 9,434 | 100.0 |

== District 1 ==
2025 New York City Council 1st district election
- November 4, 2025
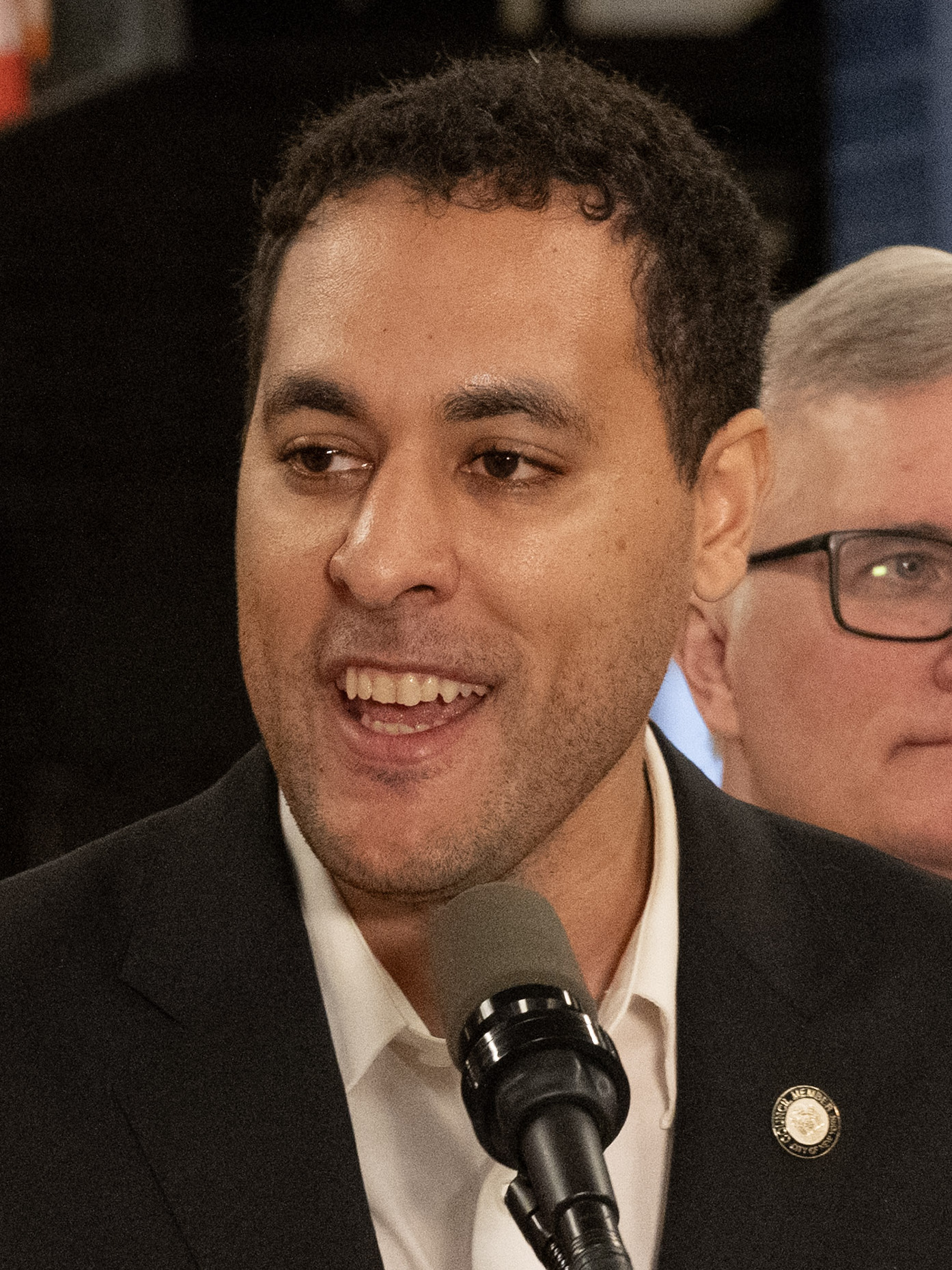

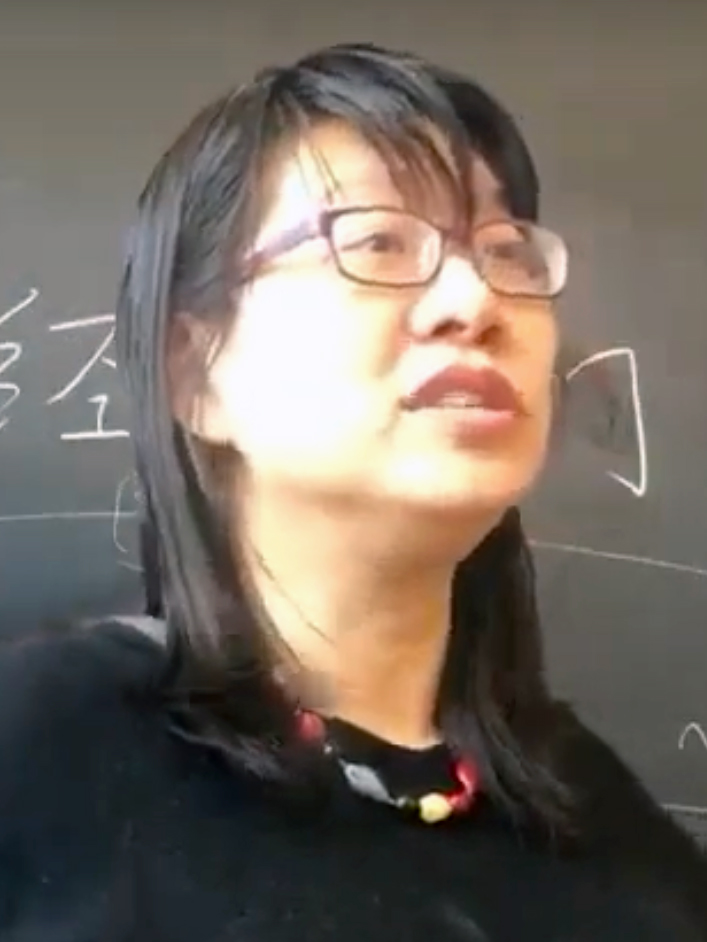
| | Majority party | Minority party |
|---|---|---|
| Candidate | Christopher Marte | Helen Qiu |
| Party | Democratic | Republican |
| Alliance | Working Families | Conservative |
| Popular vote | 32,162 | 12,504 |
| Percentage | 71.7% | 27.9% |
Councilmember before election
Christopher Marte
Democratic
Elected Councilmember
Christopher Marte
Democratic

=== Democratic primary ===
Incumbent Christopher Marte faced a collection of spirited primary challengers in the 2025 cycle, with YIMBY groups eager to unseat the councilman after he had been the only Manhattan councilor to oppose the 2024 City of Yes rezoning proposal. Marte was challenged by three members of Manhattan Community Board 1; lawyer Jess Coleman, NYPD counterterrorism official Elizabeth Lewinsohn, and Metropolitan Transport Authority official Eric Yu.

Marte ran for re-election with the support of numerous progressive groups that he had not previously won the endorsement of; the Working Families Party gave him their support in a move that surprised many, as the incumbent's opposition to housing development and congestion pricing had been criticised by progressives. Marte defended his anti-development record on the campaign trail, campaigning on his support for preserving the Elizabeth Street Garden and broader green space, and claiming that his opponents were backed by elitist real estate interests. Coleman was supported by several pro-development groups such as Open New York, and ran on the argument that Marte's opposition to new housing projects was driving up rents and damaging local business. Lewinsohn was supported by Marte's predecessor, Margaret Chin, and campaigned mostly on crime, arguing for increased NYPD funding. Unlike the other three candidates Lewinsohn did not participate in New York City's public election financing system, self-funding her campaign and substantially outraising all of her competitors.

==== Declared ====
- Jess Coleman, lawyer & member of Manhattan Community Board 1 (2021–present)
- Elizabeth Lewinsohn, former community head of the NYPD Counterterrorism Bureau & member of Manhattan Community Board 1 (2012–present)
- Christopher Marte, incumbent Councilmember
- Eric Yu, Director of Expense Analysis for Service Delivery for the Metropolitan Transportation Authority & member of Manhattan Community Board 1 (2021–present)

==== Endorsements ====
Jess Coleman

Organizations

- Abundant New York
- NYC New Liberals
- OpenPlans
- Jim Owles Liberal Democratic Club
- Stonewall Democratic Club of New York (first choice)

Newspapers

- Washington Square News
Elizabeth Lewinsohn

Local officials

- Margaret Chin, former NYC Councilor for the 1st district

Labor unions

- United Federation of Teachers
Christopher Marte

Individuals

- Ana Maria Archila, activist and co-director of the New York Working Families Party

Labor unions

- LiUNA! New York
- New York City Central Labor Council
- Professional Staff Congress
- United Auto Workers Region 9A

Organizations

- New York City Council Progressive Caucus Alliance
- New York League of Conservation Voters
- Planned Parenthood of Greater New York Action Fund
- Stonewall Democratic Club of New York (second choice)
- Working Families Party

==== Results ====

Marte

30–40%
40–50%
50–60%
60–70%
70–80%

Lewinsohn

30–40%
40–50%

Coleman

30–40%

Other

20–30% tie

Marte

30–40%
40–50%
50–60%
60–70%
70–80%

Lewinsohn

30–40%
40–50%

Coleman

30–40%

Other

20–30% tie

Marte

30–40%
40–50%
50–60%
60–70%
70–80%

Lewinsohn

30–40%
40–50%
50–60%

Coleman

30–40%
40–50%

Marte

50–60%
60–70%
70–80%
80–90%

Lewinsohn

50–60%
60–70%

Democratic primary results
| Party | Candidate | Maximum round | Maximum votes | Share in maximum round | Maximum votes First round votes Transfer votes |
|---|---|---|---|---|---|
| Democratic | Christopher Marte (incumbent) | 4 | 12,862 | 61.9% | |
| Democratic | Elizabeth Lewinsohn | 4 | 7,905 | 38.1% | |
| Democratic | Jess Coleman | 3 | 4,123 | 18.6% | |
| Democratic | Eric Yu | 2 | 2,327 | 10.1% | |
| Write-in | | 1 | 109 | 0.5% | |

=== Republican primary ===
==== Declared ====
- Helen Qiu, pastor and nominee for this district in 2023

=== General election ===
==== Results ====
2025 New York City's 1st City Council district election
| Party | Candidate | Votes | % | ±% |
|---|---|---|---|---|
| Democratic | Christopher Marte | 27,556 | 61.46% | −6.68% |
| Working Families | Christopher Marte | 4,606 | 10.27% | N/A |
| Total | Christopher Marte (incumbent) | 32,162 | 71.73% | +3.59% |
| Republican | Helen Qiu | 11,447 | 25.53% | −2.07% |
| Conservative | Helen Qiu | 1,057 | 2.36% | −1.12% |
| Total | Helen Qiu | 12,504 | 27.89% | −3.19% |
| Write-in | | 171 | 0.38% | -0.40% |
| Total votes | | 44,837 | 100.0% | |
| Democratic hold | | | | |

== District 2 ==
2025 New York City Council 2nd district election
- November 4, 2025
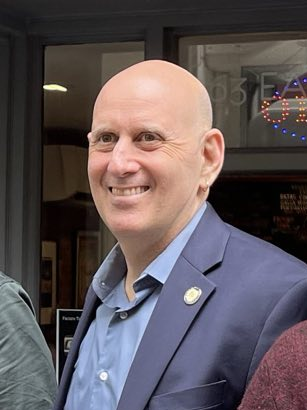

| | Majority party | Minority party |
|---|---|---|
| Candidate | Harvey Epstein | Jason Murillo |
| Party | Democratic | Republican |
| Alliance | Working Families | Conservative |
| Popular vote | 40,627 | 8,419 |
| Percentage | 78.2% | 16.3% |
Councilmember before election
Carlina Rivera
Democratic
Elected Councilmember
Harvey Epstein
Democratic

=== Democratic primary ===
==== Declared ====
- Sarah Batchu, member of Manhattan Community Board 3 (2022–present)
- Harvey Epstein, State Assemblymember for the 74th district (2018–present)
- Andrea Gordillo, chair of Manhattan Community Board 3 (2023–present)
- Allison Ryan, candidate for this district in 2023 and Neighborhood Party nominee in 2021
- Anthony Weiner, former U.S. representative from New York's 9th congressional district (1999–2011), former New York City Councilmember from the 48th district (1992–1998), and candidate for Mayor of New York City in 2005 and 2013

==== Campaign ====
Incumbent councilwoman Carlina Rivera was term-limited in the 2025, leaving an open race to replace her. The race was highly competitive, with a number of high-profile candidates running.

The candidate widely considered the frontrunner was state assemblyman Harvey Epstein, who was jointly favoured by most of the Democratic establishment and by progressive groups. Epstein had previously served on the New York City Rent Guidelines Board, and had close ties to many tenant's rights organisations that backed his campaign. Epstein's campaign received widespread attention in late 2024 when it was the subject of a sketch on the popular comedy show Saturday Night Live, with comedian John Mulaney playing the assemblyman while commenting on his misfortune in sharing a first and last name with the prominent sex offenders Harvey Weinstein and Jeffrey Epstein.

Also running were Sarah Batchu, a member of Manhattan Community Board 3 and a former staffer for Bill de Blasio, who based her campaign around a need for generational change, and Andrea Gordillo, the chair of Community Board 3 who campaigned on the need to support artists. Allie Ryan, who had unsuccessfully attempted to primary Rivera in 2023, ran again, and campaigned largely against e-bikes.

The candidate that received the most national media attention was however Anthony Weiner, a formerly high-profile congressman who had been forced to resign over numerous sexting scandals, and who had spent 18 months in prison after being convicted of sexting a 15-year old girl in 2016. Weiner campaigned as a staunch centrist, advocating against e-bikes and fare evasion, and in favor of more police hires. Josh Tyrangiel, writing in The Atlantic, deemed Weiner's centrism to be highly out-of-step with the progressive 2nd district, and noted that Weiner showed little interest in tailoring his messaging to skeptical audiences. Combined with his past scandals, Tyrangiel thus considered Weiner highly unlikely to win the election.

==== Endorsements ====
Sarah Batchu

U.S. representatives

- Carolyn Maloney, former U.S. Representative from New York's 12th congressional district (1993–2023)

Individuals

- Ana Maria Archila, activist and co-director of the New York Working Families Party (second choice co-endorsement with Gordillo)
- John Avlon, journalist and board chair of Citizens Union (second choice)
- Suraj Patel, attorney

Labor unions

- Council of School Supervisors & Administrators (co-endorsement with Epstein)
- International Union of Painters and Allied Trades District Council 9 (second choice)

Organizations

- Citizens Union (second choice)
- Jews for Racial and Economic Justice (second or third choice co-endorsement with Gordillo)
- Run for Something (co-endorsement with Gordillo)
- Stonewall Democratic Club of New York (second choice)
- Working Families Party (second choice co-endorsement with Gordillo)
Harvey Epstein

U.S. representatives

- Dan Goldman, U.S. Representative from New York's 10th congressional district (2023–present)
- Jerry Nadler, U.S. Representative from New York's 12th congressional district (1993–present)

Statewide officials

- Letitia James, Attorney General of New York (2019–present)

Local officials

- Rafael Espinal, former New York City Councilmember from the 37th district (2014–2020) (first choice)
- Margarita López, former New York City Councilmember from the 2nd district (1998–2005)
- Rosie Méndez, former New York City Councilmember from the 2nd district (2006–2017)

Individuals

- Ana Maria Archila, activist and co-director of the New York Working Families Party (first choice)
- John Avlon, journalist and board chair of Citizens Union (first choice)

Labor unions

- 1199SEIU United Healthcare Workers East
- Communications Workers of America District 1
- Council of School Supervisors & Administrators (co-endorsement with Batchu)
- District Council 37
- Hotel Trades Council
- New York State Nurses Association
- New York City Central Labor Council
- NYC District Council of Carpenters
- Professional Staff Congress (first choice)
- SEIU 32BJ
- United Auto Workers Region 9A (first choice)
- United Federation of Teachers

Organizations

- Citizen Action of New York
- Citizens Union (first choice)
- Freelancers Union (first choice)
- Jews for Racial and Economic Justice (first choice)
- Stonewall Democratic Club of New York (first choice)
- Working Families Party (first choice)

Newspapers

- Washington Square News
Andrea Gordillo

Local officials

- Rafael Espinal, former New York City Councilmember from the 37th district (2014–2020) (second choice)

Individuals

- Ana Maria Archila, activist and co-director of the New York Working Families Party (second choice co-endorsement with Batchu)
- John Avlon, journalist and board chair of Citizens Union (third choice)

Labor unions

- International Union of Painters and Allied Trades District Council 9 (first choice)
- United Auto Workers Region 9A (second choice)

Organizations

- Citizens Union (third choice)
- Freelancers Union (second choice)
- Jews for Racial and Economic Justice (second or third choice co-endorsement with Batchu)
- Jim Owles Liberal Democratic Club
- Latino Victory Fund
- Run for Something (co-endorsement with Batchu)
- Working Families Party (second choice co-endorsement with Batchu)
Anthony Weiner

Local officials

- Frank Seddio, former State Assemblymember from the 59th district (2003–2006)

==== Results ====

Epstein

20–30%
30–40%
40–50%
50–60%
60–70%

Batchu

20–30%

Gordillo

20–30%
30–40%

Other

30–40% tie
No votes

Epstein

20–30%
30–40%
40–50%
50–60%
60–70%

Batchu

20–30%

Gordillo

20–30%
30–40%

Other

30–40% tie
No votes

Epstein

30–40%
40–50%
50–60%
60–70%

Batchu

40–50%

Gordillo

30–40%
40–50%

Other

No votes

Epstein

50–60%
60–70%
70–80%

Batchu

50–60%

Other

50% tie
No votes

Democratic primary results (unofficial until certified)
| Party | Candidate | Maximum round | Maximum votes | Share in maximum round | Maximum votes First round votes Transfer votes |
|---|---|---|---|---|---|
| Democratic | Harvey Epstein | 4 | 13,851 | 56.7% | |
| Democratic | Sarah Batchu | 4 | 10,580 | 43.3% | |
| Democratic | Andrea Gordillo | 3 | 6,532 | 24.9% | |
| Democratic | Anthony Weiner | 2 | 2,948 | 10.3% | |
| Democratic | Allie Ryan | 2 | 2,268 | 7.9% | |
| Write-in | | 1 | 124 | 0.4% | |

=== Republican primary ===
==== Declared ====
- Jason Murillo, radio show host & music producer

=== Events ===
Debates & Forums
| Venue | Date | Format | Andrea Gordillo | Allison Ryan | Anthony Weiner | Harvey Epstein | Jason Murillo | Sarah Batchu |
|---|---|---|---|---|---|---|---|---|
| East Village Subreddit | May 28, 2025 | AMA | ✓ | ✓ | ✗ | ✓ | ✗ | ✓ |

- ✓ – Participated
- — – Did not attend
- ✗ – Was not invited

=== General election ===
==== Results ====
2025 New York City's 2nd City Council district election
| Party | Candidate | Votes | % | ±% |
|---|---|---|---|---|
| Democratic | Harvey Epstein | 34,191 | 66.37% | −12.65% |
| Working Families | Harvey Epstein | 7,750 | 11.79% | −2.05% |
| Total | Harvey Epstein | 40,267 | 78.16% | -14.70% |
| Republican | Jason Murillo | 7,750 | 15.04% | N/A |
| Conservative | Jason Murillo | 669 | 1.30% | N/A |
| Total | Jason Murillo | 8,419 | 16.34% | N/A |
| The Unity | Allie Ryan | 1,630 | 3.16% | N/A |
| CleanSafeStreet | Gail Schargel | 1,104 | 2.14% | N/A |
| Write-in | | 96 | 0.19% | -6.95% |
| Total votes | | 51,516 | 100.0% | |
| Democratic hold | | | | |

== District 3 ==
2025 New York City Council 3rd district election
- November 4, 2025
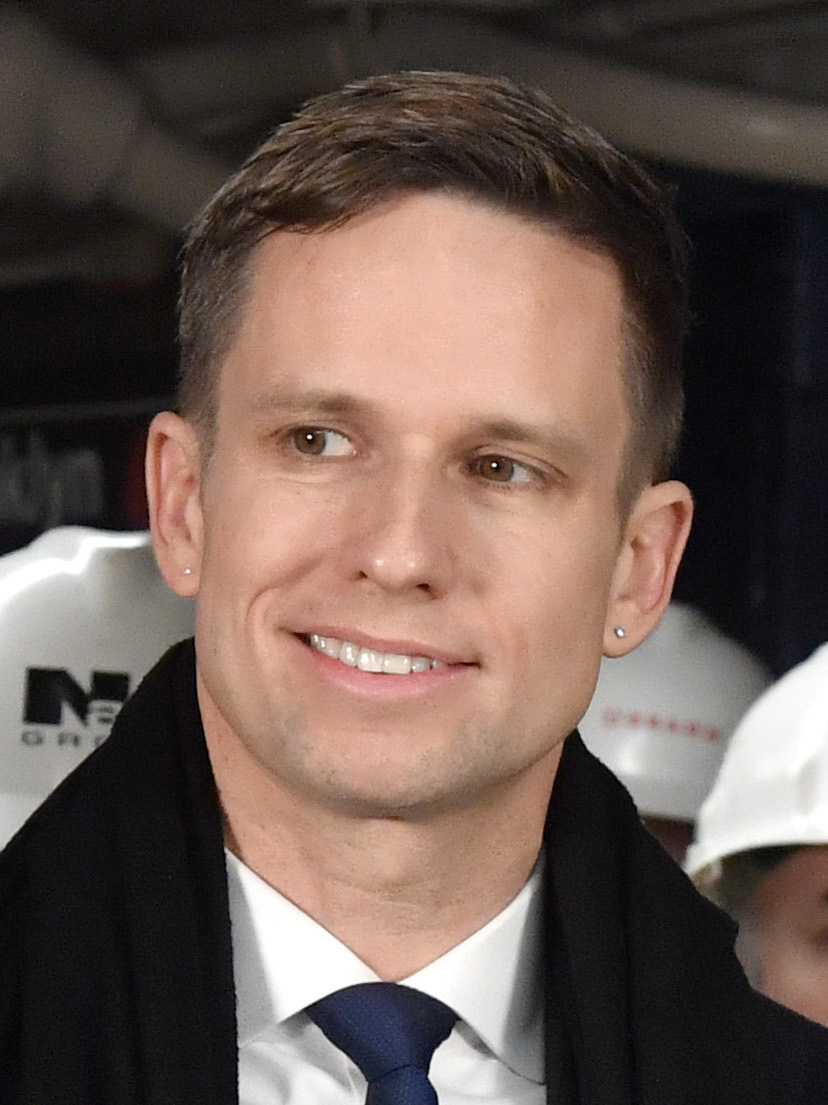

| | Majority party | Minority party |
|---|---|---|
| Candidate | Erik Bottcher | Dominick Romeo |
| Party | Democratic | A Blue Collar |
| Popular vote | 44,739 | 4,655 |
| Percentage | 89.9% | 9.3% |
Councilmember before election
Erik Bottcher
Democratic
Elected Councilmember
Erik Bottcher
Democratic

=== Democratic primary ===
Erik Bottcher, the incumbent councilman, ran for re-election. He faced primary opposition from Jacqueline Lara, a tenant activist who campaigned against Bottcher's support for the redevelopment of New York City Housing Authority public housing estates in Chelsea, arguing that this would effectively evict many public housing tenants. Bottcher campaigned on building bike lanes and affordable housing, and expanding New York City's mental health support services.

==== Declared ====
- Erik Bottcher, incumbent Councilmember
- Jacqueline Lara, housing advocate

==== Endorsements ====
Erik Bottcher

Local officials

- Rafael Espinal, former New York City Councilmember from the 37th district (2014–2020)
- Brad Lander, New York City Comptroller (2022–present)

Labor unions

- Council of School Supervisors & Administrators
- LiUNA! New York
- New York City Central Labor Council
- NYC District Council of Carpenters
- Professional Staff Congress
- United Federation of Teachers

Organizations

- Abundant New York
- Freelancers Union
- Jim Owles Liberal Democratic Club
- LGBTQ+ Victory Fund
- New York League of Conservation Voters
- Stonewall Democratic Club of New York

Newspapers

- Washington Square News

==== Results ====

Bottcher

50–60%
60–70%
70–80%
80–90%

Lara

50–60%

Democratic primary results
| Party | Candidate | Votes | % |
|---|---|---|---|
| Democratic | Erik Bottcher (incumbent) | 20,399 | 74.1 |
| Democratic | Jacqueline Lara | 6,967 | 25.3 |
| Write-in | | 179 | 0.6 |
| Total votes | | 27,545 | 100.0 |

=== Independents ===
==== Declared ====
- Dominick Romeo

=== General election ===
==== Results ====
2025 New York City's 3rd City Council district election
| Party | Candidate | Votes | % |
|---|---|---|---|
| Democratic | Erik Bottcher (incumbent) | 44,739 | 89.87% |
| A Blue Collar | Dominick Romeo (Note: Shared with "Fight and Deliver" ballot line.) | 4,655 | 9.35% |
| Write-in | | 386 | 0.78% |
| Total votes | | 49,780 | 100.0% |
| Democratic hold | | | |

== District 4 ==
2025 New York City Council 4th district election
- November 4, 2025
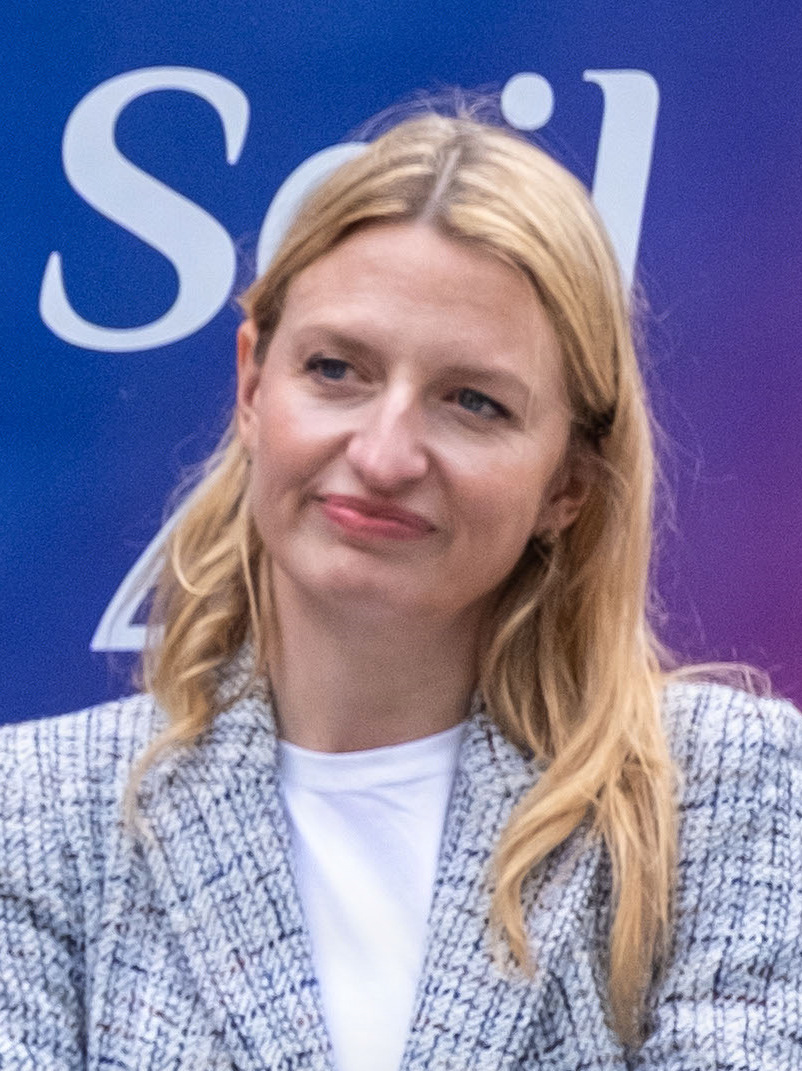

| | Majority party | Minority party |
|---|---|---|
| Candidate | Virginia Maloney | Debra Schwartzben |
| Party | Democratic | Republican |
| Popular vote | 40,508 | 15,608 |
| Percentage | 69.1% | 26.6% |
Councilmember before election
Keith Powers
Democratic
Elected Councilmember
Virginia Maloney
Democratic

=== Democratic primary ===
==== Declared ====
- Vanessa Aronson, teacher and candidate for this district in 2017
- Faith Bondy, attorney
- Luke Florczak, U.S. Marine Corps veteran
- Virginia Maloney, project manager and daughter of former U.S. Representative Carolyn Maloney
- Rachel Storch, COO of the Fifth Avenue Synagogue and former Missouri state representative from the 64th district (2005–2011)
- Ben Wetzler, former Democratic district leader from the 76th assembly district and great-nephew of former state assemblymember George M. Michaels

==== Withdrawn ====
- Kyle Athayde, member of Manhattan Community Board 6

==== Endorsements ====
Vanessa Aronson

Individuals

- Ana Maria Archila, activist and co-director of the New York Working Families Party
- John Avlon, journalist and board chair of Citizens Union (first choice)
- Ben Wetzler, former Democratic district leader from the 76th assembly district and council candidate (cross-endorsement)

Organizations

- Citizens Union (first choice)
- Jim Owles Liberal Democratic Club
- Run for Something (co-endorsement with Maloney)
- Working Families Party
Faith Bondy

State legislators

- Rachel Storch, former Missouri State Representative from the 64th district (2005–2011) and council candidate (cross-endorsement)

Local officials

- Ben Kallos, former New York City Councilmember from the 5th district (2014–2022) (co-endorsement with Maloney)

Individuals

- John Avlon, journalist and board chair of Citizens Union (fourth choice)

Labor unions

- ~~Communications Workers of America District 1 (co-endorsement with Maloney)~~
- 1199SEIU United Healthcare Workers East
- Council of School Supervisors & Administrators
- District Council 37
- NYC District Council of Carpenters (co-endorsement with Maloney)

Organizations

- Citizens Union (fourth choice)

Newspapers

- The Jewish Voice (second choice co-endorsement with Maloney)
Virginia Maloney

U.S. representatives

- Carolyn Maloney, former U.S. Representative from New York's 12th congressional district (1993–2023) (candidate's mother)

Local officials

- Ben Kallos, former New York City Councilmember from the 5th district (2014–2022) (co-endorsement with Bondy)
- Gifford Miller, former Speaker of the New York City Council (2002–2005) from the 4th district (1996–2005)

Individuals

- John Avlon, journalist and board chair of Citizens Union (third choice)

Labor unions

- Communications Workers of America District 1
- NYC District Council of Carpenters (co-endorsement with Bondy)
- United Federation of Teachers

Organizations

- Citizens Union (third choice)
- Run for Something (co-endorsement with Aronson)
- Stonewall Democratic Club of New York

Newspapers

- The Jewish Voice (second choice co-endorsement with Bondy)
Rachel Storch

State legislators

- Kenny Burgos, former State Assemblymember from the 85th district (2020–2024)

Individuals

- John Avlon, journalist and board chair of Citizens Union (fifth choice)
- Faith Bondy, attorney and council candidate (cross-endorsement)

Organizations

- Citizens Union (fifth choice)

Newspapers

- The Jewish Voice (first choice)
Ben Wetzler

Individuals

- Vanessa Aronson, teacher and council candidate (cross-endorsement)
- John Avlon, journalist and board chair of Citizens Union (second choice)

Organizations

- Abundant New York
- Citizens Union (second choice)

Newspapers

- Washington Square News
Declined to endorse

State legislators

- Alex Bores, State Assemblymember from the 73rd district (2023–present)
- Liz Krueger, State Senator from the 28th district (2002–present)

Local officials

- Keith Powers, former Majority Leader of the New York City Council (2022–2024) from the 4th district (2018–present)

Labor unions

- New York City Central Labor Council

==== Results ====

Maloney

20–30%
30–40%
40–50%
90–100%

Aronson

20–30%
30–40%
40–50%

Storch

20–30%
30–40%
40–50%

Wetzler

20–30%

Bondy

30–40%

Other

20–30% tie
No votes

Maloney

20–30%
30–40%
40–50%
90–100%

Aronson

20–30%
30–40%
40–50%

Storch

20–30%
30–40%
40–50%

Wetzler

20–30%

Bondy

30–40%

Other

20–30% tie
No votes

Maloney

20–30%
30–40%
40–50%
90–100%

Aronson

20–30%
30–40%
40–50%

Storch

20–30%
30–40%
40–50%

Wetzler

30–40%

Other

No votes

Maloney

30–40%
40–50%
90–100%

Aronson

30–40%
40–50%
50–60%

Storch

30–40%
40–50%

Other

30–40% tie
No votes

Maloney

50–60%
60–70%
70–80%
90–100%

Aronson

50–60%
60–70%

Other

No votes

Democratic primary results (unofficial until certified)
| Party | Candidate | Maximum round | Maximum votes | Share in maximum round | Maximum votes First round votes Transfer votes |
|---|---|---|---|---|---|
| Democratic | Virginia Maloney | 5 | 12,258 | 53.2% | |
| Democratic | Vanessa Aronson | 5 | 10,772 | 46.8% | |
| Democratic | Rachel Storch | 4 | 7,704 | 29.9% | |
| Democratic | Benjamin Wetzler | 3 | 4,476 | 16.6% | |
| Democratic | Faith Bondy | 2 | 2,182 | 7.9% | |
| Democratic | Lukas Florczak | 2 | 468 | 1.7% | |
| Write-in | | 1 | 156 | 0.6% | |

=== General election ===
==== Results ====
2025 New York City's 4th City Council district election
| Party | Candidate | Votes | % |
|---|---|---|---|
| Democratic | Virginia Maloney | 40,508 | 69.09% |
| Republican | Debra Schwartzben | 15,608 | 26.62% |
| Revive East Side | Kyle Athayde | 2,406 | 4.10% |
| Write-in | | 108 | 0.18% |
| Total votes | | 58,630 | 100.0% |
| Democratic hold | | | |

== District 5 ==
2025 New York City Council 5th district election
- November 4, 2025
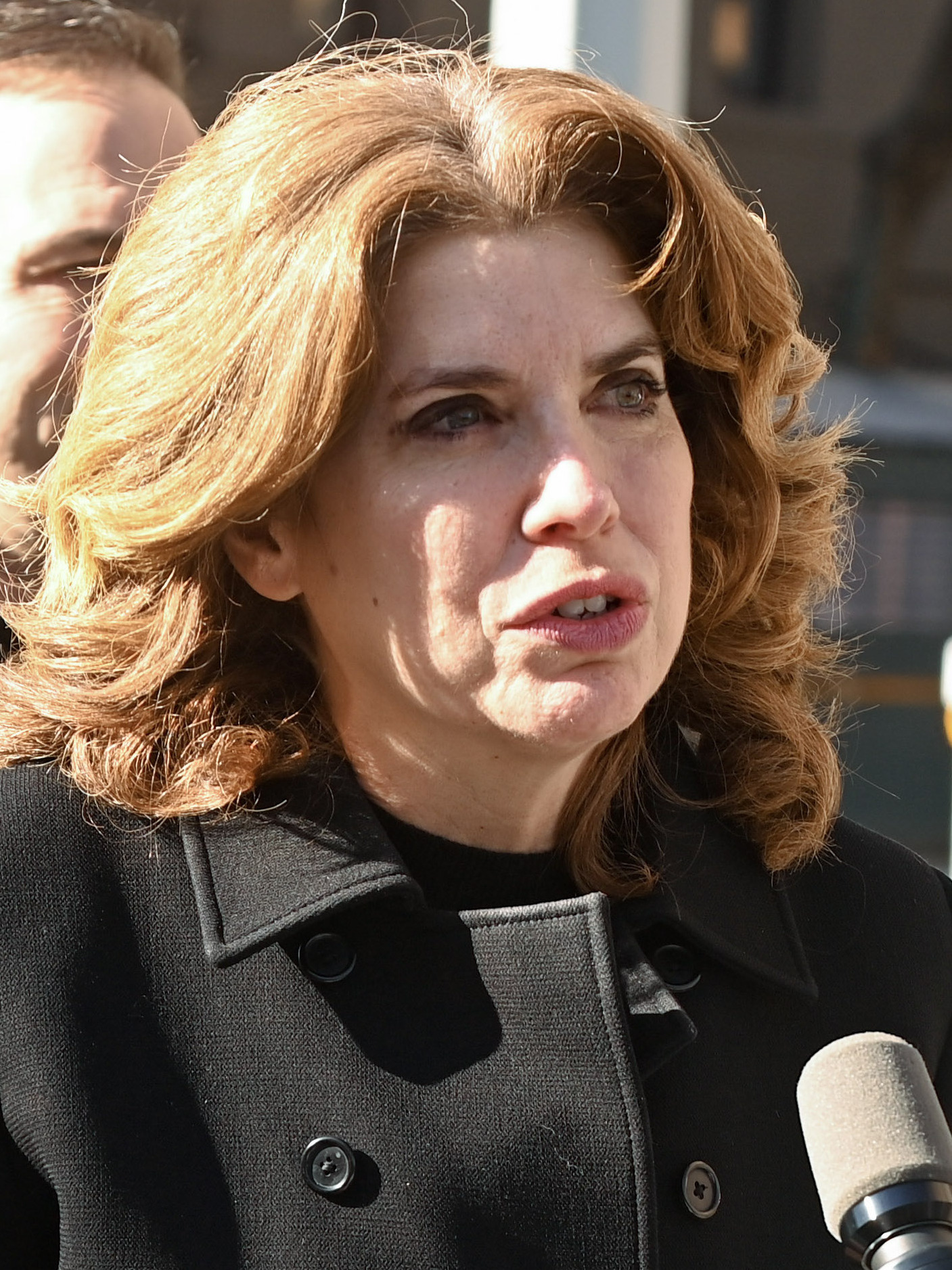

| | Majority party | Minority party |
|---|---|---|
| Candidate | Julie Menin | Alina Bonsell |
| Party | Democratic | Republican |
| Popular vote | 49,426 | 17,423 |
| Percentage | 73.9% | 26.1% |
Councilmember before election
Julie Menin
Democratic
Elected Councilmember
Julie Menin
Democratic

=== Democratic primary ===
Incumbent councilwoman Julie Menin entered the 2025 cycle as one of the highest-profile members of the council and its second most prolific fundraiser, and was widely touted as the next council Speaker following the term-limiting of Adrienne Adams. Menin campaigned on increased school funding and improved sanitation, having worked to decrease New York City's rat population. She faced a primary challenge from teacher Collin Thompson, who campaigned on liberalizing permitting requirements and shifting responsibility for making mental health checks from the New York City Police Department to a dedicated mental health unit.

==== Declared ====
- Julie Menin, incumbent Councilmember
- Collin Thompson, educator

==== Endorsements ====
Julie Menin

State legislators

- Kenny Burgos, former State Assemblymember from the 85th district (2020–2024)

Local officials

- Rafael Espinal, former New York City Councilmember from the 37th district (2014–2020)

Individuals

- John Avlon, journalist and board chair of Citizens Union

Labor unions

- 1199SEIU United Healthcare Workers East
- Communications Workers of America District 1
- Council of School Supervisors & Administrators
- District Council 37
- Hotel Trades Council
- International Union of Painters and Allied Trades District Council 9
- LiUNA! New York
- New York City Central Labor Council
- New York State Nurses Association
- NYC District Council of Carpenters
- SEIU 32BJ
- United Federation of Teachers

Organizations

- Citizens Union
- Freelancers Union
- New York League of Conservation Voters
- Planned Parenthood of Greater New York Action Fund
- Stonewall Democratic Club of New York

Newspapers

- The Jewish Voice

==== Results ====

Menin

60–70%
70–80%
80–90%
90–100%

Democratic primary results
| Party | Candidate | Votes | % |
|---|---|---|---|
| Democratic | Julie Menin (incumbent) | 22,802 | 73.4 |
| Democratic | Collin Thompson | 8,053 | 25.9 |
| Write-in | | 229 | 0.7 |
| Total votes | | 31,084 | 100.0 |

=== Republican primary ===
==== Declared ====
- Alina Bonsell

=== General election ===
==== Results ====
2025 New York City's 5th City Council district election
| Party | Candidate | Votes | % |
|---|---|---|---|
| Democratic | Julie Menin (incumbent) | 49,426 | 73.7% |
| Republican | Alina Bonsell | 17,423 | 26.0% |
| Write-in | | 203 | 0.30% |
| Total votes | | 67,052 | 100.0% |
| Democratic hold | | | |

== District 6 ==
2025 New York City Council 6th district election
- November 4, 2025
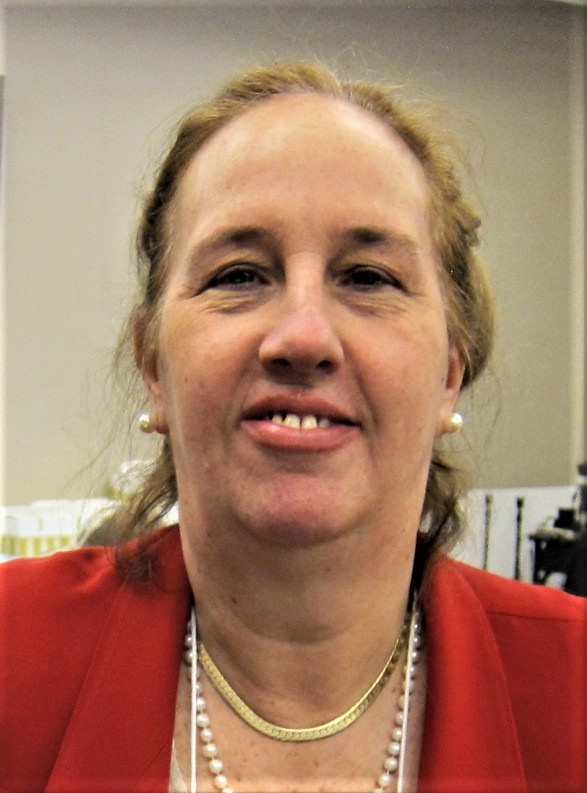
| | Majority party |
|---|---|
| Candidate | Gale Brewer |
| Party | Democratic |
| Alliance | Working Families |
| Popular vote | 54,740 |
| Percentage | 98.1% |
Councilmember before election
Gale Brewer
Democratic
Elected Councilmember
Gale Brewer
Democratic

=== Democratic primary ===
==== Declared ====
- Gale Brewer, incumbent Councilmember

==== Endorsements ====
Gale Brewer

Labor unions

- 1199SEIU United Healthcare Workers East
- Council of School Supervisors & Administrators
- International Union of Painters and Allied Trades District Council 9
- LiUNA! New York
- New York City Central Labor Council
- New York State Nurses Association
- NYC District Council of Carpenters
- Professional Staff Congress
- United Federation of Teachers

Organizations

- Jim Owles Liberal Democratic Club
- New York League of Conservation Voters
- Stonewall Democratic Club of New York

=== General election ===
==== Results ====
2025 New York City's 6th City Council district election
| Party | Candidate | Votes | % |
|---|---|---|---|
| Democratic | Gale Brewer | 48,189 | 86.35% |
| Working Families | Gale Brewer | 6,551 | 11.74% |
| Total | Gale Brewer (incumbent) | 54,740 | 98.09% |
| Write-in | | 1,066 | 1.91% |
| Total votes | | 55,806 | 100.0% |
| Democratic hold | | | |

== District 7 ==
2025 New York City Council 7th district election
- November 4, 2025
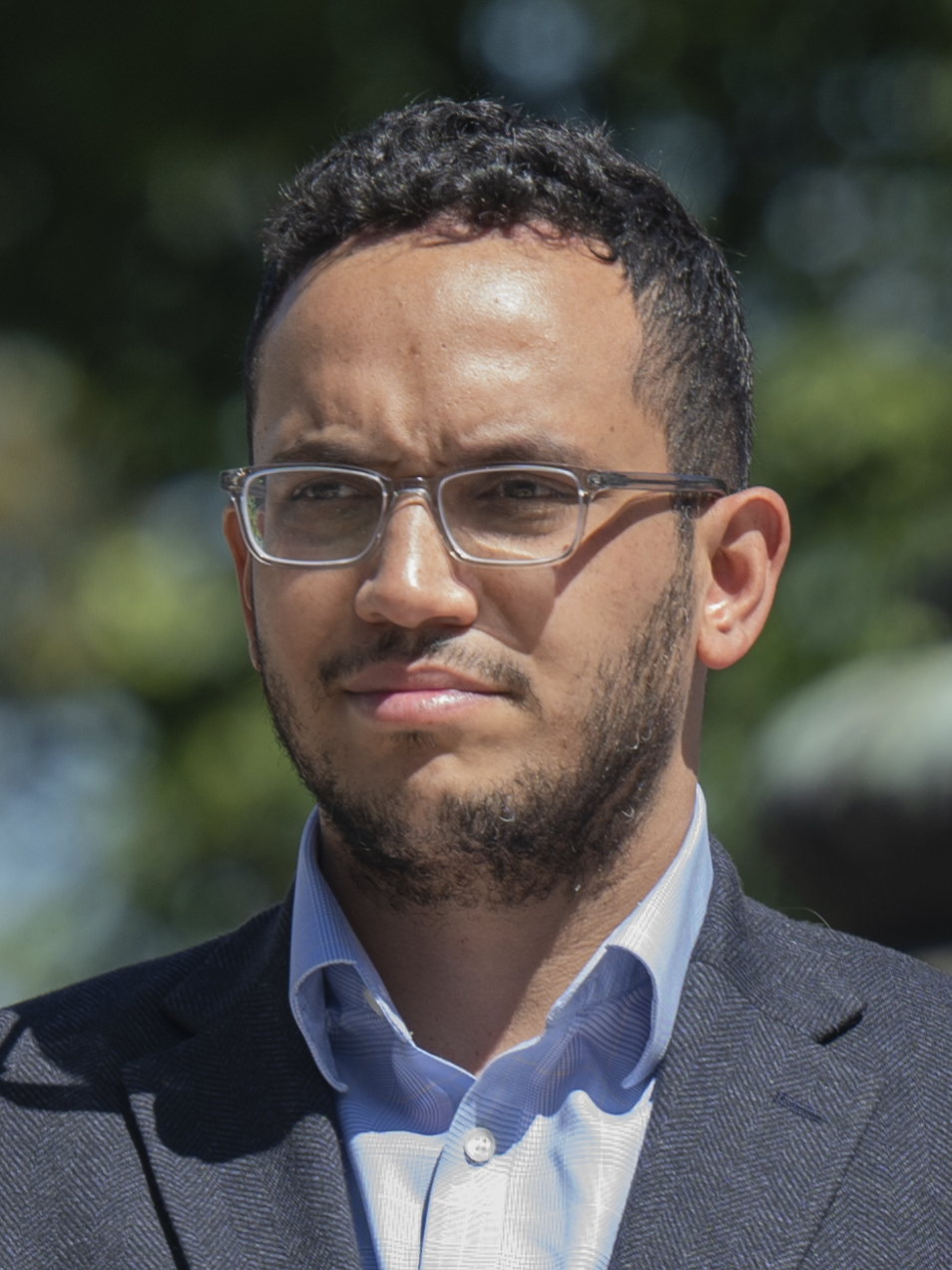

| | Majority party | Minority party |
|---|---|---|
| Candidate | Shaun Abreu | Manual Williams |
| Party | Democratic | Republican |
| Alliance | Working Families |
| Popular vote | 42,614 | 4,371 |
| Percentage | 86.3% | 8.8% |
Councilmember before election
Shaun Abreu
Democratic
Elected Councilmember
Shaun Abreu
Democratic

=== Democratic primary ===
==== Declared ====
- Shaun Abreu, incumbent Councilmember
- Tiffany Khan, businesswoman
- Edafe Okporo, migrant advocate

==== Withdrawn ====
- Gordon Springs

==== Endorsements ====
Shaun Abreu

U.S. representatives

- Jerry Nadler, U.S. Representative from New York's 12th congressional district (1993–present)

Statewide officials

- Letitia James, Attorney General of New York (2019–present)

State legislators

- Brad Hoylman-Sigal, state senator from the 47th district (2013–present)
- Micah Lasher, state assemblymember from the 69th district (2025–present)
- Linda Rosenthal, state assemblymember from the 67th district (2006–present)

Local officials

- Rafael Espinal, former New York City Councilmember from the 37th district (2014–2020)
- Brad Lander, New York City Comptroller (2022–present)
- Mark Levine, Manhattan Borough President (2022–present)

Individuals

- Ana Maria Archila, activist and co-director of the New York Working Families Party

Labor unions

- 1199SEIU United Healthcare Workers East
- Communications Workers of America District 1
- Council of School Supervisors & Administrators
- District Council 37
- Hotel Trades Council
- International Union of Painters and Allied Trades District Council 9
- LiUNA! New York
- New York City Central Labor Council
- New York State Nurses Association
- NYC District Council of Carpenters
- Professional Staff Congress
- SEIU 32BJ
- United Auto Workers Region 9A
- United Federation of Teachers

Organizations

- Abundant New York
- Freelancers Union
- Jim Owles Liberal Democratic Club
- New York League of Conservation Voters
- Stonewall Democratic Club of New York
- Working Families Party
Edafe Okporo

Organizations

- Jews for Racial and Economic Justice
- Our Revolution
- Run for Something
- Sunrise Movement NYC

==== Results ====

Abreu

40–50%
50–60%
60–70%
70–80%

Other

No votes

Democratic primary results
| Party | Candidate | Votes | % |
|---|---|---|---|
| Democratic | Shaun Abreu (incumbent) | 18,783 | 62.7 |
| Democratic | Edafe Okporo | 7,484 | 25.0 |
| Democratic | Tiffany Khan | 3,533 | 11.8 |
| Write-in | | 145 | 0.5 |
| Total votes | | 29,945 | 100.0 |

=== Republican primary ===
==== Declared ====
- Manual Williams, businessman

=== General election ===
==== Results ====
2025 New York City's 7th City Council district election
| Party | Candidate | Votes | % |
|---|---|---|---|
| Democratic | Shaun Abreu | 35,528 | 71.93% |
| Working Families | Shaun Abreu | 7,086 | 14.35% |
| Total | Shaun Abreu (incumbent) | 42,614 | 86.28% |
| Republican | Manual Williams | 4,371 | 8.85% |
| West Side United | Edafe Okporo | 2,323 | 4.70% |
| Write-in | | 83 | 0.17% |
| Total votes | | 49,391 | 100.0% |
| Democratic hold | | | |

== District 8 ==
2025 New York City Council 8th district election
- November 4, 2025
| | Majority party | Minority party |
|---|---|---|
| Candidate | Elsie Encarnacion | Tyreek Goodman |
| Party | Democratic | Republican |
| Alliance | Working Families | Conservative |
| Popular vote | 23,371 | 3,307 |
| Percentage | 84.7% | 12.0% |
Councilmember before election
Diana Ayala
Democratic
Elected Councilmember
Elsie Encarnacion
Democratic

=== Democratic primary ===
==== Declared ====
- Clarisa Alayeto, chair of Bronx Community Board 1 (2023–present)
- Federico Colon, former chief of staff to Councilmember Adam Clayton Powell IV
- Rosa Diaz, secretary of Manhattan Community Board 11
- Elsie Encarnacion, chief of staff to Councilmember Diana Ayala
- Wilfredo López, former legislative director and counsel for councilmember Ben Kallos and candidate for New York's 68th State Assembly district in 2022
- Nicholas Reyes, community engagement manager, State Democrats Committee Member AD 68, former member of Manhattan Community Board 11
- Raymond Santana, criminal justice advocate and member of the Exonerated Five

==== Withdrawn ====
- Daniel Aulbach-Sidibe, learning specialist
- Evette Zayas, founder of CakeBurgers

==== Declined ====
- Eddie Gibbs, State Assemblymember from the 68th district (2022–present)

==== Endorsements ====
Clarisa Alayeto

Individuals

- John Avlon, journalist and board chair of Citizens Union (third choice)

Organizations

- Citizens Union (third choice)
- Jews for Racial and Economic Justice (second or third choice co-endorsement with Santana)
- LGBTQ+ Victory Fund
- LPAC
- Stonewall Democratic Club of New York (second choice)
Elsie Encarnacion

Local officials

- Diana Ayala, New York City Councilmember from the 8th district (2018–present)
- Crystal Hudson, New York City Councilmember from the 35th district (2022–present)
- Rafael Salamanca, New York City Councilmember from the 17th district (2016–present)

Individuals

- Ana Maria Archila, activist and co-director of the New York Working Families Party
- John Avlon, journalist and board chair of Citizens Union (first choice)

Labor unions

- 1199SEIU United Healthcare Workers East
- Council of School Supervisors & Administrators
- District Council 37
- New York City Central Labor Council
- United Federation of Teachers

Organizations

- Abundant New York
- Bronx Democratic Party
- Citizens Union (first choice)
- Jews for Racial and Economic Justice (first choice)
- Jim Owles Liberal Democratic Club
- Stonewall Democratic Club of New York (first choice)
- Working Families Party
Wilfredo López

Individuals

- John Avlon, journalist and board chair of Citizens Union (second choice)

Labor unions

- Communications Workers of America District 1

Organizations

- Citizen Action of New York
- Citizens Union (second choice)
Raymond Santana

Organizations

- Jews for Racial and Economic Justice (second or third choice co-endorsement with Alayeto)

==== Results ====

Encarnacion

20–30%
30–40%
40–50%
50–60%

Lopez

10–20%
20–30%
30–40%

Alayeto

10–20%
20–30%
30–40%
40–50%

Diaz

70–80%

Other

20–30% tie
No votes

Encarnacion

20–30%
30–40%
40–50%
50–60%

Lopez

10–20%
20–30%
30–40%

Alayeto

20–30%
30–40%
40–50%

Diaz

70–80%

Other

20–30% tie
No votes

Encarnacion

20–30%
30–40%
40–50%
50–60%

Lopez

20–30%
30–40%

Alayeto

20–30%
30–40%
40–50%

Diaz

80–90%

Other

No votes

Encarnacion

20–30%
30–40%
40–50%
50–60%

Lopez

20–30%
30–40%
40–50%

Alayeto

20–30%
30–40%
40–50%
50–60%

Diaz

80–90%

Other

20–30% tie
No votes

Encarnacion

30–40%
40–50%
50–60%

Lopez

20–30%
30–40%
40–50%
60–70%

Alayeto

20–30%
30–40%
40–50%
50–60%

Santana

20–30%
30–40%

Other

No votes

Encarnacion

30–40%
40–50%
50–60%
60–70%

Lopez

30–40%
40–50%
50–60%
60–70%

Alayeto

30–40%
40–50%
50–60%

Other

30–40% tie
No votes

Encarnacion

50–60%
60–70%
70–80%

Lopez

50–60%
60–70%
70–80%

Other

50% tie
No votes

Democratic primary results (unofficial until certified)
| Party | Candidate | Maximum round | Maximum votes | Share in maximum round | Maximum votes First round votes Transfer votes |
|---|---|---|---|---|---|
| Democratic | Elsie Encarnacion | 7 | 6,334 | 58.3% | |
| Democratic | Wilfredo Lopez | 7 | 4,528 | 41.7% | |
| Democratic | Clarisa Alayeto | 6 | 2,956 | 24.2% | |
| Democratic | Raymond Santana | 5 | 2,418 | 18.4% | |
| Democratic | Rosa Diaz | 4 | 1,735 | 12.6% | |
| Democratic | Frederico Colon | 3 | 1,330 | 9.2% | |
| Democratic | Nicholas Reyes | 2 | 1,053 | 7.1% | |
| Write-in | | 1 | 86 | 0.6% | |

=== General election ===
==== Results ====
2025 New York City's 8th City Council district election
| Party | Candidate | Votes | % |
|---|---|---|---|
| Democratic | Elsie Encarnacion | 19,914 | 72.14% |
| Working Families | Elsie Encarnacion | 3,457 | 12.52% |
| Total | Elsie Encarnacion | 23,371 | 84.67% |
| Republican | Tyreek Goodman | 2,867 | 10.39% |
| Conservative | Tyreek Goodman | 440 | 1.59% |
| Total | Tyreek Goodman | 3,307 | 11.98% |
| The Unity | Federico Colon | 861 | 3.12% |
| Write-in | | 64 | 0.23% |
| Total votes | | 27,603 | 100.0% |
| Democratic hold | | | |

== District 9 ==
2025 New York City Council 9th district election
- November 4, 2025
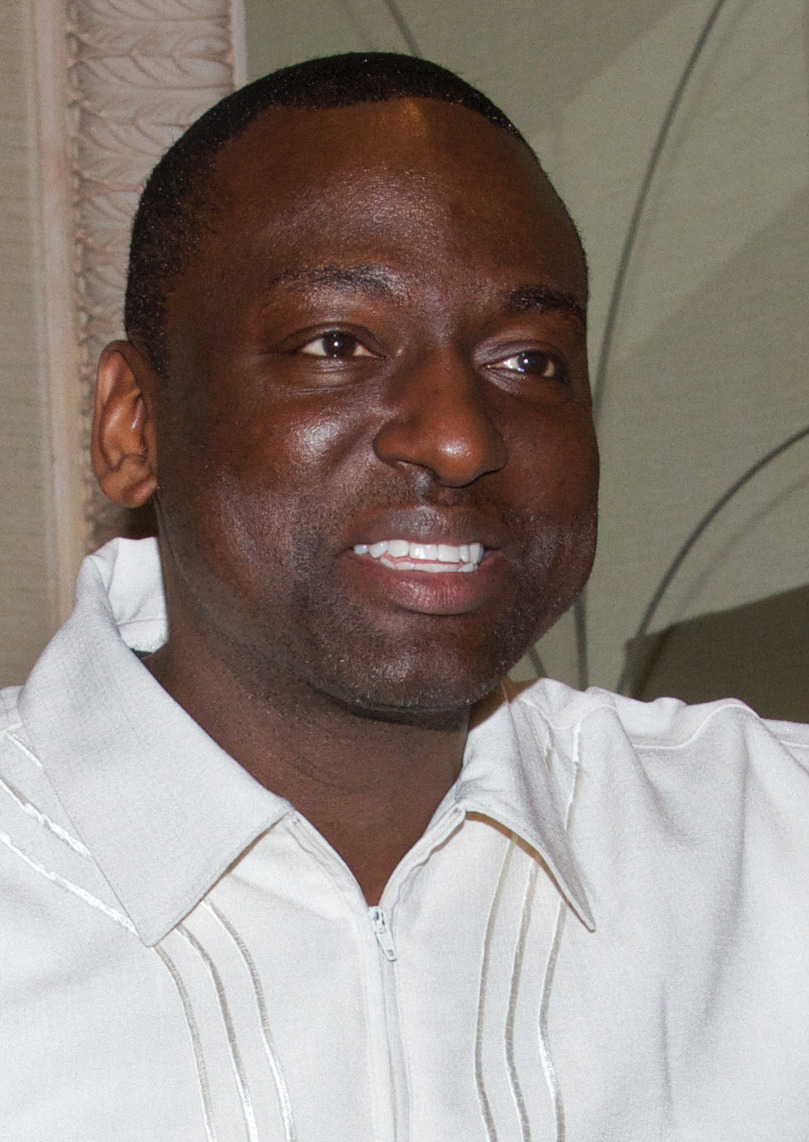
| | Majority party |
|---|---|
| Candidate | Yusef Salaam |
| Party | Democratic |
| Popular vote | 36,510 |
| Percentage | 98.8% |
Councilmember before election
Yusef Salaam
Democratic
Elected Councilmember
Yusef Salaam
Democratic

=== Democratic primary ===
==== Declared ====
- Yusef Salaam, incumbent Councilmember

==== Endorsements ====
Yusef Salaam

U.S. representatives

- Charles Rangel, former U.S. Representative from New York's 13th congressional district (1971–2017)

State legislators

- Cordell Cleare, State Senator from the 30th district (2021–present)
- Inez Dickens, former State Assemblymember from the 70th district (2017–2025)
- Eddie Gibbs, State Assemblymember from the 68th district (2022–present)
- Robert Jackson, State Senator from the 31st district (2019–present)
- Al Taylor, Assistant Speaker Pro Tempore of the New York State Assembly (2023–present) from the 71st district (2017–present)
- Jordan Wright, State Assemblymember from the 70th district (2025–present)

Party officials

- Keith Wright, Chair of the Manhattan Democratic Party (2009–present)

Labor unions

- 1199SEIU United Healthcare Workers East
- Communications Workers of America District 1
- Council of School Supervisors & Administrators
- District Council 37
- Hotel Trades Council
- International Union of Painters and Allied Trades District Council 9
- LiUNA! New York
- New York State Nurses Association
- NYC District Council of Carpenters
- SEIU 32BJ
- United Federation of Teachers

Organizations

- New York League of Conservation Voters

=== General election ===
==== Results ====
2025 New York City's 9th City Council district election
| Party | Candidate | Votes | % |
|---|---|---|---|
| Democratic | Yusef Salaam (incumbent) | 36,510 | 98.85% |
| Write-in | | 425 | 1.15% |
| Total votes | | 36,935 | 100.0% |
| Democratic hold | | | |

== District 10 ==
2025 New York City Council 10th district election
- November 4, 2025
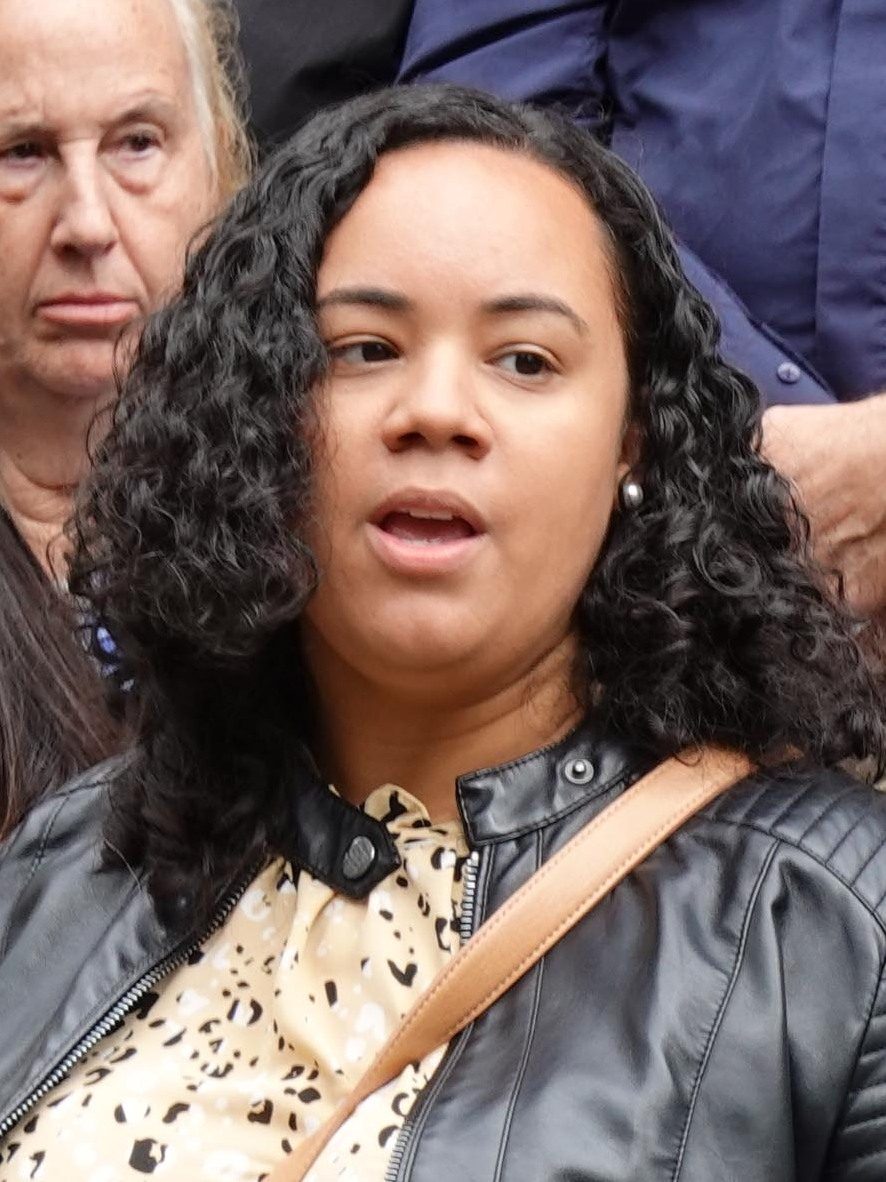

| | Majority party | Minority party |
|---|---|---|
| Candidate | Carmen De La Rosa | Louisa Flores |
| Party | Democratic | Republican |
| Alliance | Working Families |
| Popular vote | 33,895 | 4,014 |
| Percentage | 86.8% | 10.3% |
Councilmember before election
Carmen De La Rosa
Democratic
Elected Councilmember
Carmen De La Rosa
Democratic

=== Democratic primary ===
Incumbent Carmen De La Rosa, who had first been elected to the council in 2021, ran for re-election. A progressive, De La Rosa faced a challenge from moderate Francesca Castellanos, who was affiliated with the 'Unity Party' of Public Advocate candidate Marty Dolan.

==== Declared ====
- Francesca Castellanos, candidate for New York's 72nd State Assembly district in 2024
- Carmen De La Rosa, incumbent Councilmember

==== Endorsements ====
Carmen De La Rosa

Local officials

- Rafael Espinal, former New York City Councilmember from the 37th district (2014–2020)
- Brad Lander, New York City Comptroller (2022–present)

Individuals

- Ana Maria Archila, activist and co-director of the New York Working Families Party

Labor unions

- 1199SEIU United Healthcare Workers East
- Communications Workers of America District 1
- Council of School Supervisors & Administrators
- District Council 37
- Hotel Trades Council
- International Union of Painters and Allied Trades District Council 9
- LiUNA! New York
- New York City Central Labor Council
- New York State Nurses Association
- NYC District Council of Carpenters
- Professional Staff Congress
- SEIU 32BJ
- United Federation of Teachers

Organizations

- Freelancers Union
- Make the Road Action
- New York League of Conservation Voters
- Stonewall Democratic Club of New York
- Working Families Party

==== Results ====

De La Rosa

80–90%
90–100%

Democratic primary results
| Party | Candidate | Votes | % |
|---|---|---|---|
| Democratic | Carmen De La Rosa (incumbent) | 18,860 | 87.2 |
| Democratic | Francesca Castellanos | 2,659 | 12.3 |
| Write-in | | 112 | 0.5 |
| Total votes | | 21,631 | 100.0 |

=== General election ===
==== Results ====
2025 New York City's 10th City Council district election
| Party | Candidate | Votes | % |
|---|---|---|---|
| Democratic | Carmen De La Rosa | 26,900 | 68.92% |
| Working Families | Carmen De La Rosa | 6,995 | 17.92% |
| Total | Carmen De La Rosa (incumbent) | 33,895 | 86.85% |
| Republican | Louisa Flores | 4,014 | 10.28% |
| Unity | Francesca Castellanos | 1,003 | 2.57% |
| Write-in | | | |
| Total votes | | 39,029 | 100.0% |
| Democratic hold | | | |

== District 11 ==
2025 New York City Council 11th district election
- November 4, 2025
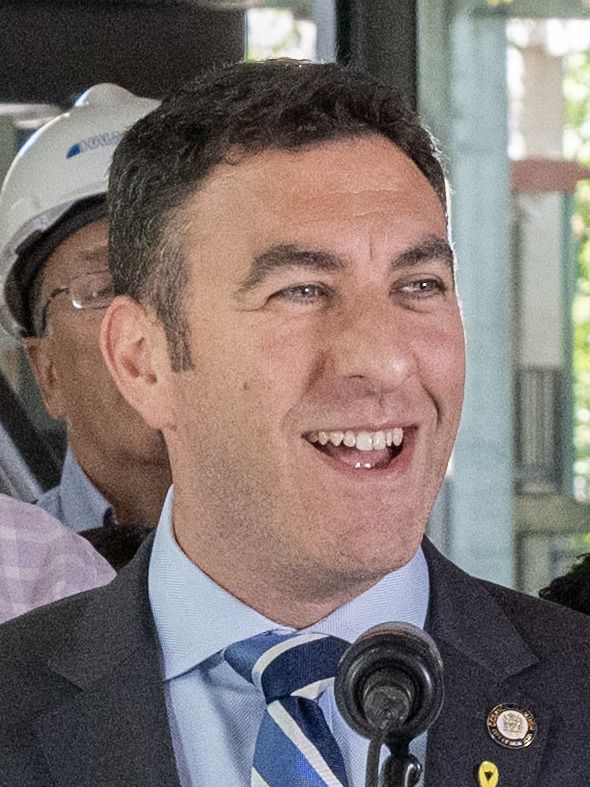

| | Majority party | Minority party |
|---|---|---|
| Candidate | Eric Dinowitz | Stylo Sapaskis |
| Party | Democratic | Republican |
| Popular vote | 28,679 | 4,588 |
| Percentage | 82.1% | 13.1% |
Councilmember before election
Eric Dinowitz
Democratic
Elected Councilmember
Eric Dinowitz
Democratic

=== Democratic primary ===
==== Declared ====
- Eric Dinowitz, incumbent Councilmember
- Danielle Herbert-Guggenheim, teacher

==== Endorsements ====
Eric Dinowitz

Local officials

- Rafael Espinal, former New York City Councilmember from the 37th district (2014–2020)

Labor unions

- 1199SEIU United Healthcare Workers East
- Communications Workers of America District 1
- Council of School Supervisors & Administrators
- District Council 37
- Hotel Trades Council
- International Union of Painters and Allied Trades District Council 9
- New York State Nurses Association
- NYC District Council of Carpenters
- SEIU 32BJ
- United Federation of Teachers

Organizations

- Freelancers Union
- New York League of Conservation Voters
- Stonewall Democratic Club of New York
Danielle Herbert-Guggenheim

Organizations

- Jews for Racial and Economic Justice
- Jim Owles Liberal Democratic Club

==== Results ====
Democratic primary results
| Party | Candidate | Votes | % |
|---|---|---|---|
| Democratic | Eric Dinowitz (incumbent) | 12,356 | 71.5 |
| Democratic | Danielle Herbert-Guggenheim | 4,830 | 27.9 |
| Write-in | | 101 | 0.6 |
| Total votes | | 17,287 | 100.0 |

=== General election ===
==== Results ====
2025 New York City's 11th City Council district election
| Party | Candidate | Votes | % |
|---|---|---|---|
| Democratic | Eric Dinowitz (incumbent) | 28,679 | 82.07% |
| Republican | Stylo Sapaskis | 4,588 | 13.13% |
| Conservative | Denise Smith | 1,402 | 4.01% |
| Write-in | | 277 | 0.79% |
| Total votes | | 34,946 | 100.0% |
| Democratic hold | | | |

== District 12 ==
2025 New York City Council 12th district election
- November 4, 2025
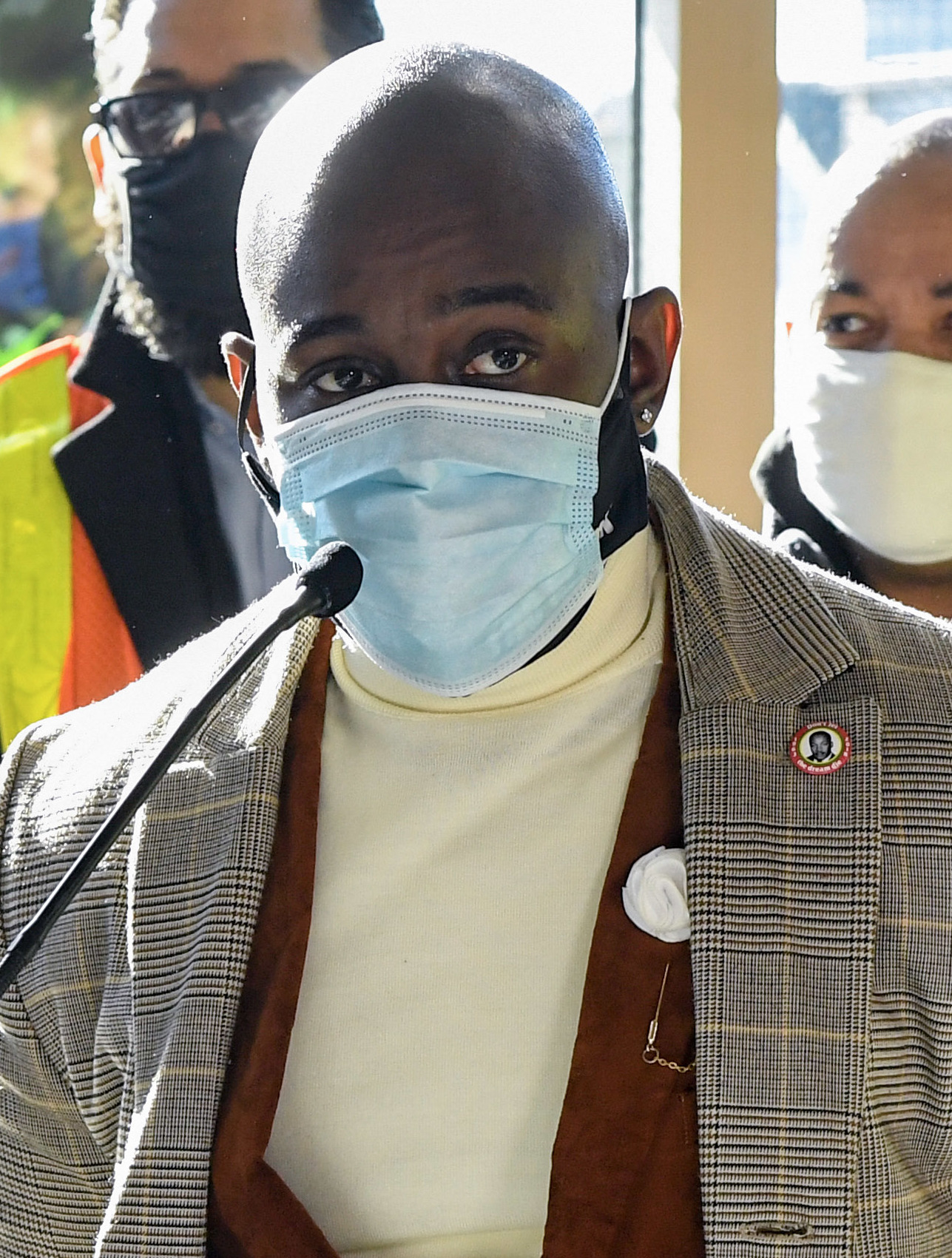

| | Majority party | Minority party |
|---|---|---|
| Candidate | Kevin Riley | Franchie Muniz Sr. |
| Party | Democratic | Republican |
| Popular vote | 24,710 | 1,793 |
| Percentage | 90.4% | 6.6% |
Councilmember before election
Kevin Riley
Democratic
Elected Councilmember
Kevin Riley
Democratic

=== Democratic primary ===
Incumbent councilman Kevin Riley, first elected in a 2020 special election, faced a primary challenge from his predecessor Andy King. King had been expelled from the council in 2020 after he was found by a council ethics committee to have harassed a staffer and taken bribes. Riley was considered an overwhelming favourite to defeat King, and the incumbent campaigned on winning funding for local infrastructure improvements and expanding access to student extracurricular programs. King campaigned by promoting his role in establishing local non-profit youth groups.

==== Declared ====
- Andy King, former Councilmember (2012-2020) and candidate for this district in 2023
- Kevin Riley, incumbent Councilmember

==== Endorsements ====
Kevin Riley

State legislators

- Kenny Burgos, former State Assemblymember from the 85th district (2020–2024)

Local officials

- Brad Lander, New York City Comptroller (2022–present)

Labor unions

- 1199SEIU United Healthcare Workers East
- Council of School Supervisors & Administrators
- District Council 37
- International Union of Painters and Allied Trades District Council 9
- LiUNA! New York
- New York City Central Labor Council
- New York State Nurses Association
- NYC District Council of Carpenters
- Professional Staff Congress
- United Federation of Teachers

Organizations

- New York League of Conservation Voters

==== Results ====
Democratic primary results
| Party | Candidate | Votes | % |
|---|---|---|---|
| Democratic | Kevin Riley (incumbent) | 12,717 | 75.5 |
| Democratic | Andy King | 4,017 | 23.9 |
| Write-in | | 107 | 0.6 |
| Total votes | | 16,841 | 100.0 |

=== General election ===
==== Results ====
2025 New York City's 12th City Council district election
| Party | Candidate | Votes | % |
|---|---|---|---|
| Democratic | Kevin Riley (incumbent) | 24,710 | 90.45% |
| Republican | Franchie Muniz Sr. | 1,793 | 6.56% |
| Conservative | James Washington-Ward | 568 | 2.08% |
| United Alliance | James Washington-Ward | 192 | 0.70% |
| Total | James Washington-Ward | 760 | 2.78% |
| Write-in | | 55 | 0.20% |
| Total votes | | 27,318 | 100.0% |
| Democratic hold | | | |

== District 13 ==
2025 New York City Council 13th district election
- November 4, 2025

| | Majority party | Minority party |
|---|---|---|
| Candidate | Shirley Aldebol | Kristy Marmorato |
| Party | Democratic | Republican |
| Alliance | Working Families | Conservative |
| Popular vote | 17,345 | 15,532 |
| Percentage | 51.6% | 46.2% |
Councilmember before election
Kristy Marmorato
Republican
Elected Councilmember
Shirley Aldebol
Democratic

=== Republican primary ===
==== Declared ====
- Kristy Marmorato, incumbent councilmember

==== Endorsements ====
Kristy Marmorato

Labor unions

- United Federation of Teachers

=== Democratic primary ===
==== Declared ====
- Shirley Aldebol, former executive vice president of SEIU 32BJ
- David Diaz, investor
- John Perez, retired Army officer
- Theona Reets-DuPont, former Chief of Staff to Councilmember Oswald Feliz
- Jacqueline Torres, HR professional

==== Withdrawn ====
- Eddie Marrero, Director of Operations of the New York State Department of Health

==== Declined ====
- Marjorie Velázquez, former New York City Councilmember from the 13th district (2022–2023)

==== Endorsements ====
Shirley Aldebol

U.S. representatives

- Alexandria Ocasio-Cortez, U.S. Representative from New York's 14th congressional district (2019–present) (second choice)

Individuals

- Ana Maria Archila, activist and co-director of the New York Working Families Party (first choice)

Labor unions

- 1199SEIU United Healthcare Workers East
- Communications Workers of America District 1
- District Council 37
- Hotel Trades Council
- LiUNA! New York
- New York City Central Labor Council
- New York State Laborers’ Political Action Committee
- New York State Nurses Association
- NYC District Council of Carpenters (Democratic primary only)
- SEIU 32BJ

Organizations

- Abundant New York
- Bronx Democratic Party
- Jews for Racial and Economic Justice (first choice)
- Stonewall Democratic Club of New York (first choice)
- Working Families Party (first choice)
David Diaz

U.S. representatives

- Alexandria Ocasio-Cortez, U.S. Representative from New York's 14th congressional district (2019–present) (first choice)

Individuals

- Ana Maria Archila, activist and co-director of the New York Working Families Party (second choice)

Organizations

- Jews for Racial and Economic Justice (second choice)
- Working Families Party (second choice)
Eddie Marrero (withdrawn)

Organizations

- Stonewall Democratic Club of New York (second choice)

==== Results ====
Democratic primary results (unofficial until certified)
| Party | Candidate | Maximum round | Maximum votes | Share in maximum round | Maximum votes First round votes Transfer votes |
|---|---|---|---|---|---|
| Democratic | Shirley Aldebol | 6 | 4,383 | 55.6% | |
| Democratic | Jacqueline Torres | 6 | 3,505 | 44.4% | |
| Democratic | David Diaz | 5 | 2,515 | 27.5% | |
| Democratic | John Perez | 4 | 1,631 | 16.5% | |
| Democratic | Joel Rivera | 3 | 1,190 | 11.4% | |
| Democratic | Theona Reets-Dupont | 2 | 655 | 6.1% | |
| Write-in | | 1 | 87 | 0.8% | |

=== General election ===
==== Results ====
2025 New York City's 13th City Council district election
| Party | Candidate | Votes | % |
|---|---|---|---|
| Democratic | Shirley Aldebol | 15,416 | 45.85% |
| Working Families | Shirley Aldebol | 1,929 | 5.74% |
| Total | Shirley Aldebol | 17,345 | 51.59% |
| Republican | Kristy Marmorato | 13,873 | 41.26% |
| Conservative | Kristy Marmorato | 1,659 | 4.93% |
| Total | Kristy Marmorato (incumbent) | 15,532 | 46.20% |
| The Unity | Joel Rivera | 700 | 2.08% |
| Write-in | | 44 | 0.13% |
| Total votes | | 33,621 | 100.0% |
| Democratic gain from Republican | | | |

== District 14 ==
2025 New York City Council 14th district election
- November 4, 2025
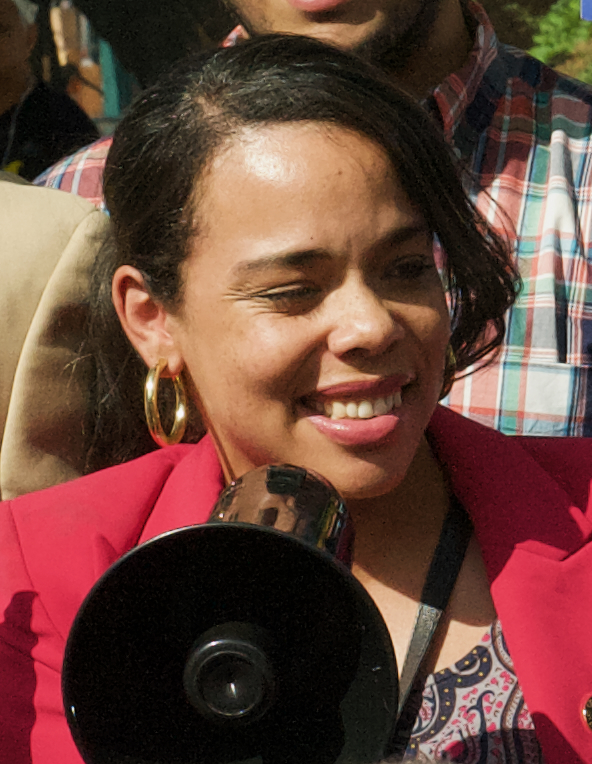
| | Majority party |
|---|---|
| Candidate | Pierina Sanchez |
| Party | Democratic |
| Alliance | Working Families |
| Popular vote | 15,917 |
| Percentage | 99.2% |
Councilmember before election
Pierina Sanchez
Democratic
Elected Councilmember
Pierina Sanchez
Democratic

=== Democratic primary ===
==== Declared ====
- Fernando Cabrera, former Councilmember for this district (2010–2021)
- Pierina Sanchez, incumbent Councilmember
- Bryan Hodge Vasquez, attorney

==== Endorsements ====
Fernando Cabrera

State legislators

- Al Taylor, State Assemblymember from the 71st district (2017–present)

Local officials

- Darlene Mealy, New York City Councilmember from the 41st district (2006–2017, 2021–present)
Pierina Sanchez

U.S. representatives

- Alexandria Ocasio-Cortez, U.S. Representative from New York's 14th congressional district (2019–present)

Local officials

- Rafael Espinal, former New York City Councilmember from the 37th district (2014–2020)
- Brad Lander, New York City Comptroller (2022–present)

Individuals

- Ana Maria Archila, activist and co-director of the New York Working Families Party
- John Avlon, journalist and board chair of Citizens Union (first choice)

Labor unions

- 1199SEIU United Healthcare Workers East
- Communications Workers of America District 1
- Council of School Supervisors & Administrators
- District Council 37
- Hotel Trades Council
- International Union of Painters and Allied Trades District Council 9
- LiUNA! New York
- New York City Central Labor Council
- New York State Nurses Association
- NYC District Council of Carpenters
- Professional Staff Congress
- SEIU 32BJ
- United Federation of Teachers

Organizations

- Abundant New York
- Citizen Action of New York
- Citizens Union (first choice)
- Freelancers Union
- Jews for Racial and Economic Justice
- Jim Owles Liberal Democratic Club
- Make the Road Action
- New York City Council Progressive Caucus Alliance
- New York League of Conservation Voters
- Stonewall Democratic Club of New York
- Working Families Party
Bryan Hodge Vasquez

Individuals

- John Avlon, journalist and board chair of Citizens Union (second choice)

Organizations

- Citizens Union (second choice)

==== Results ====
Democratic primary results
| Party | Candidate | Votes | % |
|---|---|---|---|
| Democratic | Pierina Sanchez (incumbent) | 4,397 | 66.5 |
| Democratic | Fernando Cabrera | 1,462 | 22.1 |
| Democratic | Bryan Vasquez | 724 | 10.9 |
| Write-in | | 31 | 0.5 |
| Total votes | | 6,614 | 100.0 |

=== General election ===
==== Results ====
2025 New York City's 14th City Council district election
| Party | Candidate | Votes | % |
|---|---|---|---|
| Democratic | Pierina Sanchez | 13,733 | 85.60% |
| Working Families | Pierina Sanchez | 2,184 | 13.61% |
| Total | Pierina Sanchez (incumbent) | 15,917 | 99.21% |
| Write-in | | 126 | 0.79% |
| Total votes | | 16,043 | 100.0% |
| Democratic hold | | | |

== District 15 ==
2025 New York City Council 15th district election
- November 4, 2025
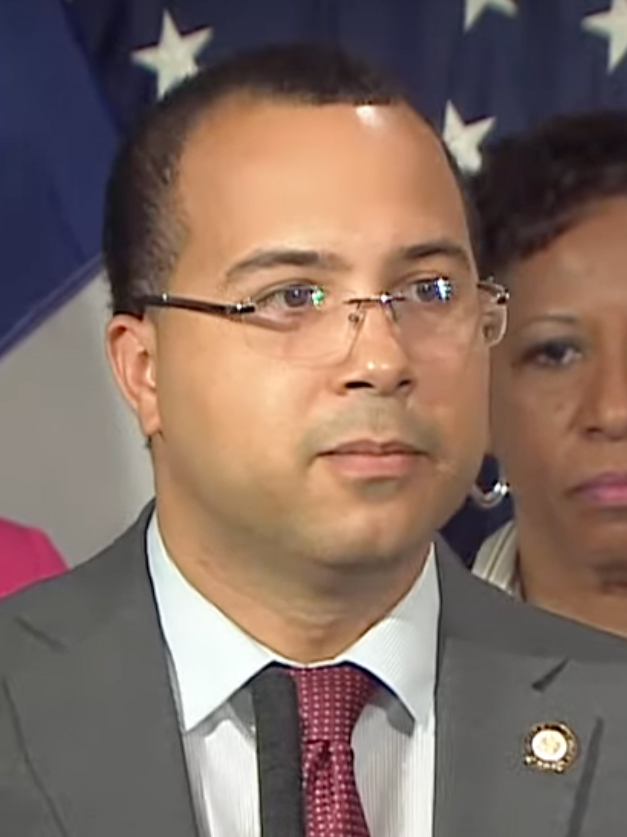

| | Majority party | Minority party |
|---|---|---|
| Candidate | Oswald Feliz | Aramis Ocasio |
| Party | Democratic | Republican |
| Popular vote | 13,939 | 1,887 |
| Percentage | 85.6% | 11.6% |
Councilmember before election
Oswald Feliz
Democratic
Elected Councilmember
Oswald Feliz
Democratic

=== Democratic primary ===
==== Declared ====
- Oswald Feliz, incumbent Councilmember

==== Endorsements ====
Oswald Feliz

Labor unions

- 1199SEIU United Healthcare Workers East
- Communications Workers of America District 1
- Council of School Supervisors & Administrators
- District Council 37
- LiUNA! New York
- New York State Nurses Association
- NYC District Council of Carpenters
- Professional Staff Congress
- United Federation of Teachers

Organizations

- New York League of Conservation Voters

=== General election ===
==== Results ====
2025 New York City's 15th City Council district election
| Party | Candidate | Votes | % |
|---|---|---|---|
| Democratic | Oswald Feliz (incumbent) | 13,939 | 85.63% |
| Republican | Aramis Ocasio | 1,887 | 11.59% |
| Conservative | Gary Lutz | 414 | 2.54% |
| Write-in | | 39 | 0.24% |
| Total votes | | 16,279 | 100.0% |
| Democratic hold | | | |

== District 16 ==
2025 New York City Council 16th district election
- November 4, 2025
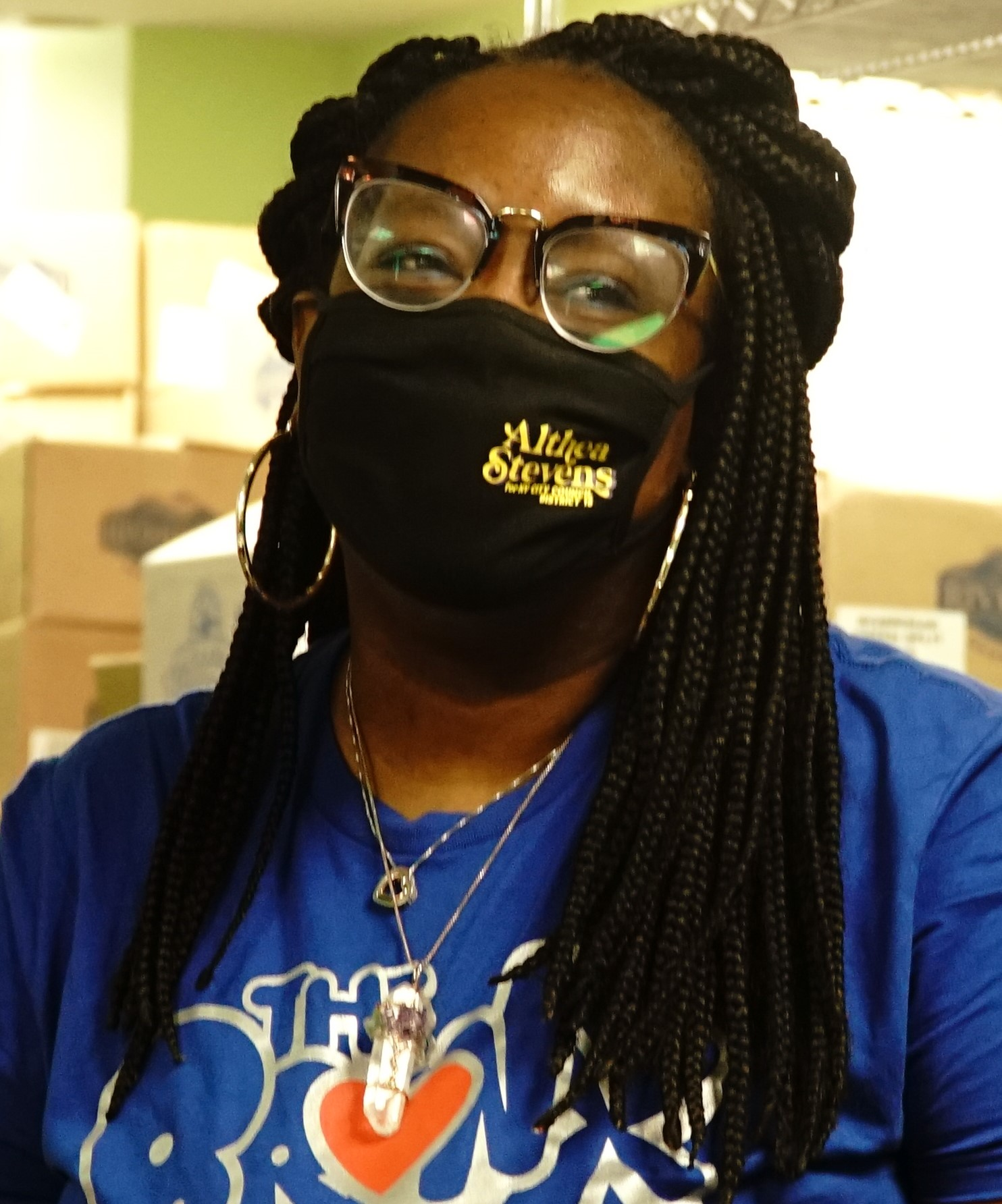

| | Majority party | Minority party |
|---|---|---|
| Candidate | Althea Stevens | Emmanuel Findlay Jr. |
| Party | Democratic | Republican |
| Alliance | Working Families | Conservative |
| Popular vote | 17,314 | 2,236 |
| Percentage | 88.4% | 11.4% |
Councilmember before election
Althea Stevens
Democratic
Elected Councilmember
Althea Stevens
Democratic

=== Democratic primary ===
==== Declared ====
- Shakur Joseph, managing director
- Althea Stevens, incumbent Councilmember

==== Endorsements ====
Althea Stevens

Local officials

- Brad Lander, New York City Comptroller (2022–present)

Individuals

- Ana Maria Archila, activist and co-director of the New York Working Families Party

Labor unions

- 1199SEIU United Healthcare Workers East
- Communications Workers of America District 1
- Council of School Supervisors & Administrators
- District Council 37
- International Union of Painters and Allied Trades District Council 9
- LiUNA! New York
- New York State Nurses Association
- United Federation of Teachers

Organizations

- Working Families Party

==== Results ====
Democratic primary results
| Party | Candidate | Votes | % |
|---|---|---|---|
| Democratic | Althea Stevens (incumbent) | 6,444 | 71.1 |
| Democratic | Shakur Joseph | 2,528 | 27.9 |
| Write-in | | 88 | 1.0 |
| Total votes | | 9,060 | 100.0 |

=== General election ===
==== Results ====
2025 New York City's 16th City Council district election
| Party | Candidate | Votes | % |
|---|---|---|---|
| Democratic | Althea Stevens | 15,673 | 80.03% |
| Working Families | Althea Stevens | 1,641 | 8.38% |
| Total | Althea Stevens (incumbent) | 17,314 | 88.41% |
| Republican | Emmanuel Findlay Jr. | 1,845 | 9.42% |
| Conservative | Emmanuel Findlay Jr. | 391 | 2.00% |
| Total | Emmanuel Findlay Jr. | 2,236 | 11.42% |
| Write-in | | 34 | 0.17% |
| Total votes | | 19,584 | 100.0% |
| Democratic hold | | | |

== District 17 ==
2025 New York City Council 17th district election
- November 4, 2025
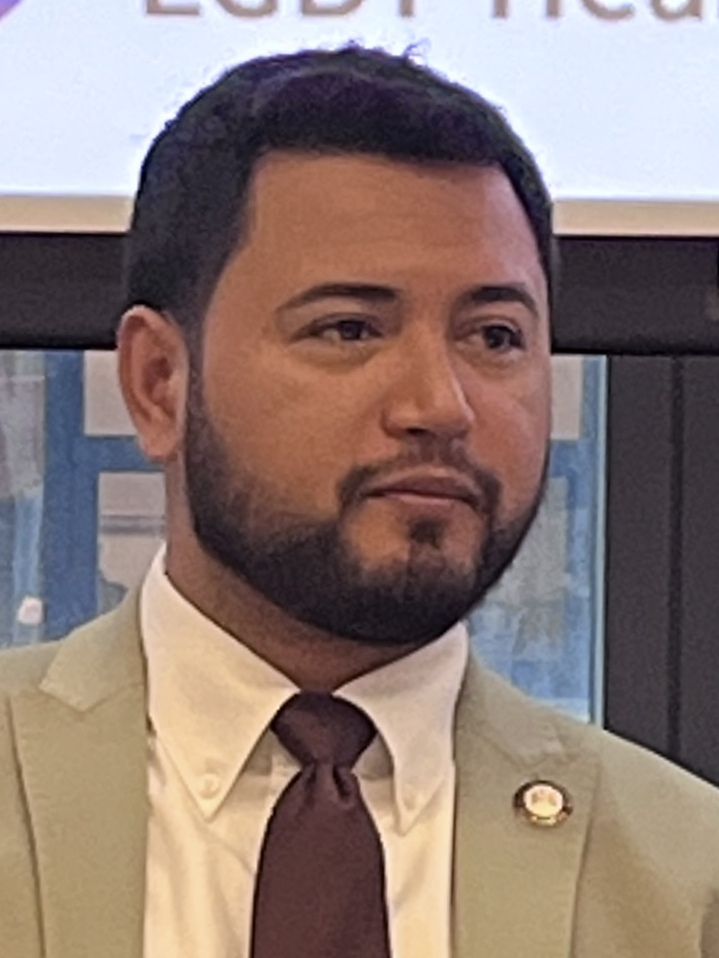

| | Majority party | Minority party |
|---|---|---|
| Candidate | Justin Sanchez | Rosaline Nieves |
| Party | Democratic | Republican |
| Alliance | Working Families |
| Popular vote | 15,657 | 1,910 |
| Percentage | 86.0% | 10.5% |
Councilmember before election
Rafael Salamanca
Democratic
Elected Councilmember
Justin Sanchez
Democratic

=== Democratic primary ===
==== Declared ====
- Antirson Ortiz, New York City Comptroller Director of Constituent Services
- Freddy Perez, first vice chair of Bronx Community Board 1 (2023–present)
- Justin Sanchez, chief of staff to State Senator Nathalia Fernandez
- Elvis Santana, activist and candidate for New York's 79th State Assembly district in 2020

==== Withdrawn ====
- Jasmine Uribe, entrepreneur

==== Endorsements ====
Antirson Ortiz

Individuals

- Ana Maria Archila, activist and co-director of the New York Working Families Party (first choice)
- John Avlon, journalist and board chair of Citizens Union (second choice)

Organizations

- Citizens Union (second choice)
- Jews for Racial and Economic Justice (first choice)
- Jim Owles Liberal Democratic Club
- Working Families Party (first choice)
Freddy Perez

Local officials

- Rubén Díaz Jr., former Bronx Borough President (2009–2021) (co-endorsement with Sanchez)
- Rafael Salamanca, New York City Councilmember from the 17th district (2016–present)
Justin Sanchez

U.S. representatives

- Alexandria Ocasio-Cortez, U.S. Representative from New York's 14th congressional district (2019–present)

Local officials

- Rubén Díaz Jr., former Bronx Borough President (2009–2021) (co-endorsement with Perez)

Individuals

- Ana Maria Archila, activist and co-director of the New York Working Families Party (second choice co-endorsement with Santana)
- John Avlon, journalist and board chair of Citizens Union (first choice)

Labor unions

- 1199SEIU United Healthcare Workers East (second choice)
- Communications Workers of America District 1
- Council of School Supervisors & Administrators
- District Council 37
- Hotel Trades Council
- LiUNA! New York
- New York City Central Labor Council
- New York State Nurses Association
- NYC District Council of Carpenters
- SEIU 32BJ
- United Auto Workers Region 9A
- United Federation of Teachers

Organizations

- Bronx Democratic Party
- Citizen Action of New York
- Citizens Union (first choice)
- Jews for Racial and Economic Justice (second or third choice co-endorsement with Santana)
- LGBTQ+ Victory Fund
- Stonewall Democratic Club of New York
- Working Families Party (second choice co-endorsement with Santana)
Elvis Santana

State legislators

- Michael Blake, former State Assemblymember from the 79th district (2015–2021)

Individuals

- Ana Maria Archila, activist and co-director of the New York Working Families Party (second choice co-endorsement with Sanchez)
- John Avlon, journalist and board chair of Citizens Union (third choice)

Labor unions

- 1199SEIU United Healthcare Workers East (first choice)

Organizations

- Citizens Union (third choice)
- Jews for Racial and Economic Justice (second or third choice co-endorsement with Sanchez)
- Working Families Party (second choice co-endorsement with Sanchez)

==== Results ====
Democratic primary results (unofficial until certified)
| Party | Candidate | Maximum round | Maximum votes | Share in maximum round | Maximum votes First round votes Transfer votes |
|---|---|---|---|---|---|
| Democratic | Justin Sanchez | 4 | 4,335 | 62.2% | |
| Democratic | Antirson Ortiz | 4 | 2,639 | 37.8% | |
| Democratic | Freddy Perez | 3 | 1,762 | 22.0% | |
| Democratic | Elvis Santana | 2 | 1,444 | 16.4% | |
| Write-in | | 1 | 85 | 1.0% | |

=== General election ===
==== Results ====
2025 New York City's 17th City Council district election
| Party | Candidate | Votes | % |
|---|---|---|---|
| Democratic | Justin Sanchez | 14,106 | 77.50% |
| Working Families | Justin Sanchez | 1,551 | 8.52% |
| Total | Justin Sanchez | 15,657 | 86.02% |
| Republican | Rosaline Nieves | 1,910 | 10.49% |
| Conservative | Marisol Duran | 586 | 3.22% |
| Write-in | | 49 | 0.27% |
| Total votes | | 18,202 | 100.0% |
| Democratic hold | | | |

== District 18 ==
2025 New York City Council 18th district election
- November 4, 2025
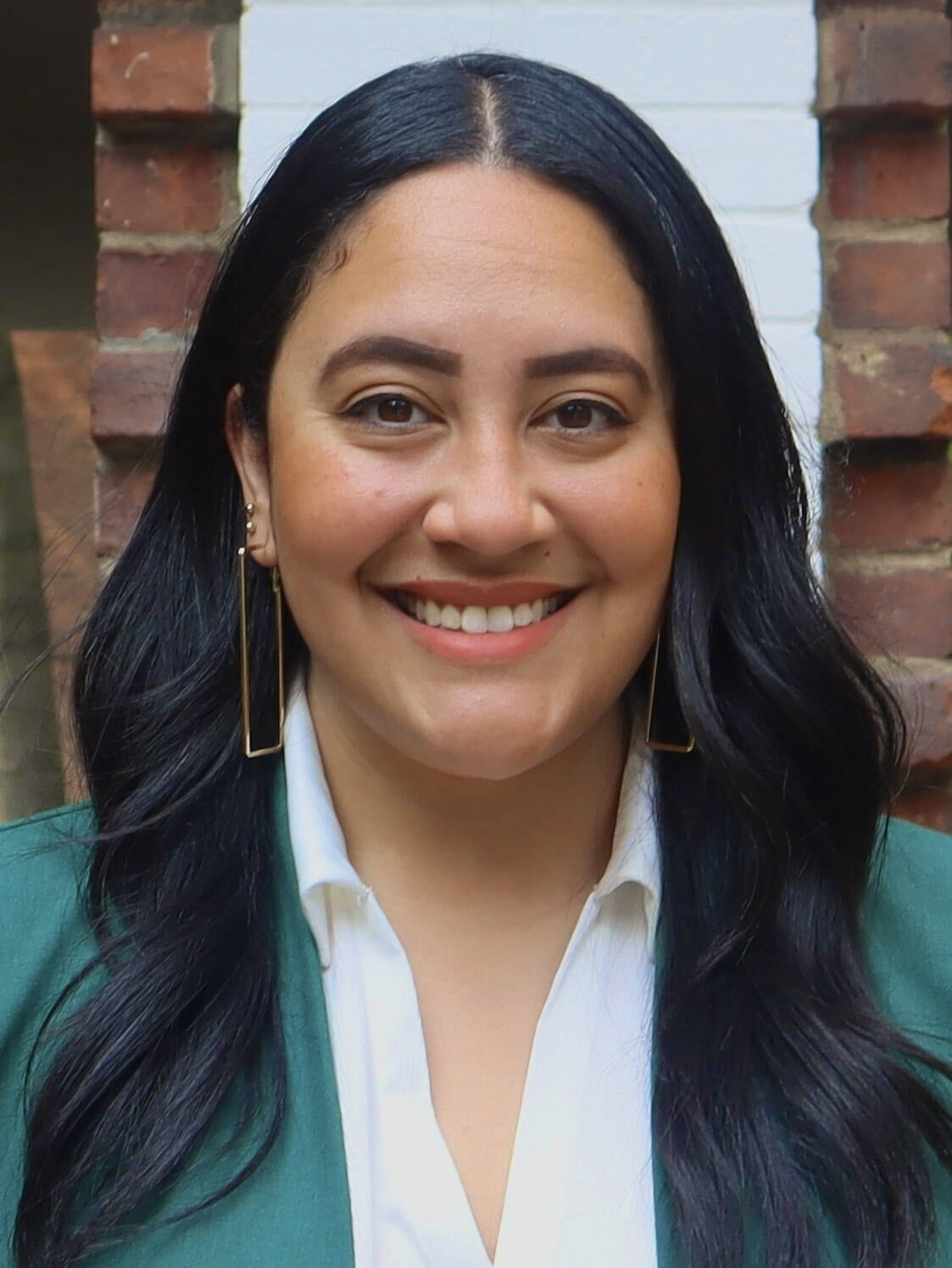

| | Majority party | Minority party |
|---|---|---|
| Candidate | Amanda Farías | Shuvonkar Saha |
| Party | Democratic | Republican |
| Alliance | Working Families |
| Popular vote | 23,268 | 2,247 |
| Percentage | 88.1% | 8.5% |
Councilmember before election
Amanda Farías
Democratic
Elected Councilmember
Amanda Farías
Democratic

=== Democratic primary ===
==== Declared ====
- Amanda Farías, incumbent Councilmember

==== Endorsements ====
Amanda Farías

Individuals

- Ana Maria Archila, activist and co-director of the New York Working Families Party

Labor unions

- 1199SEIU United Healthcare Workers East
- Communications Workers of America District 1
- Council of School Supervisors & Administrators
- International Union of Painters and Allied Trades District Council 9
- LiUNA! New York
- New York City Central Labor Council
- New York State Nurses Association
- Professional Staff Congress
- United Federation of Teachers

Organizations

- Abundant New York
- Emgage Action
- Make the Road Action
- Planned Parenthood of Greater New York Action Fund
- Stonewall Democratic Club of New York
- Working Families Party

=== General election ===
==== Results ====
2025 New York City's 18th City Council district election
| Party | Candidate | Votes | % |
|---|---|---|---|
| Democratic | Amanda Farías | 20,936 | 79.28% |
| Working Families | Amanda Farías | 2,332 | 8.83% |
| Total | Amanda Farías (incumbent) | 23,268 | 88.11% |
| Republican | Shuvonkar Saha | 2,247 | 8.51% |
| Conservative | Zenobia Merced-Bonilla | 559 | 2.12% |
| United Alliance | Wilfredo Hierrezuelo | 269 | 1.02% |
| Write-in | | 65 | 0.25% |
| Total votes | | 26,408 | 100.0% |
| Democratic hold | | | |

== District 19 ==
2025 New York City Council 19th district election
- November 4, 2025
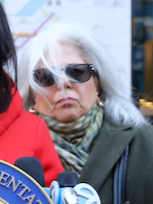

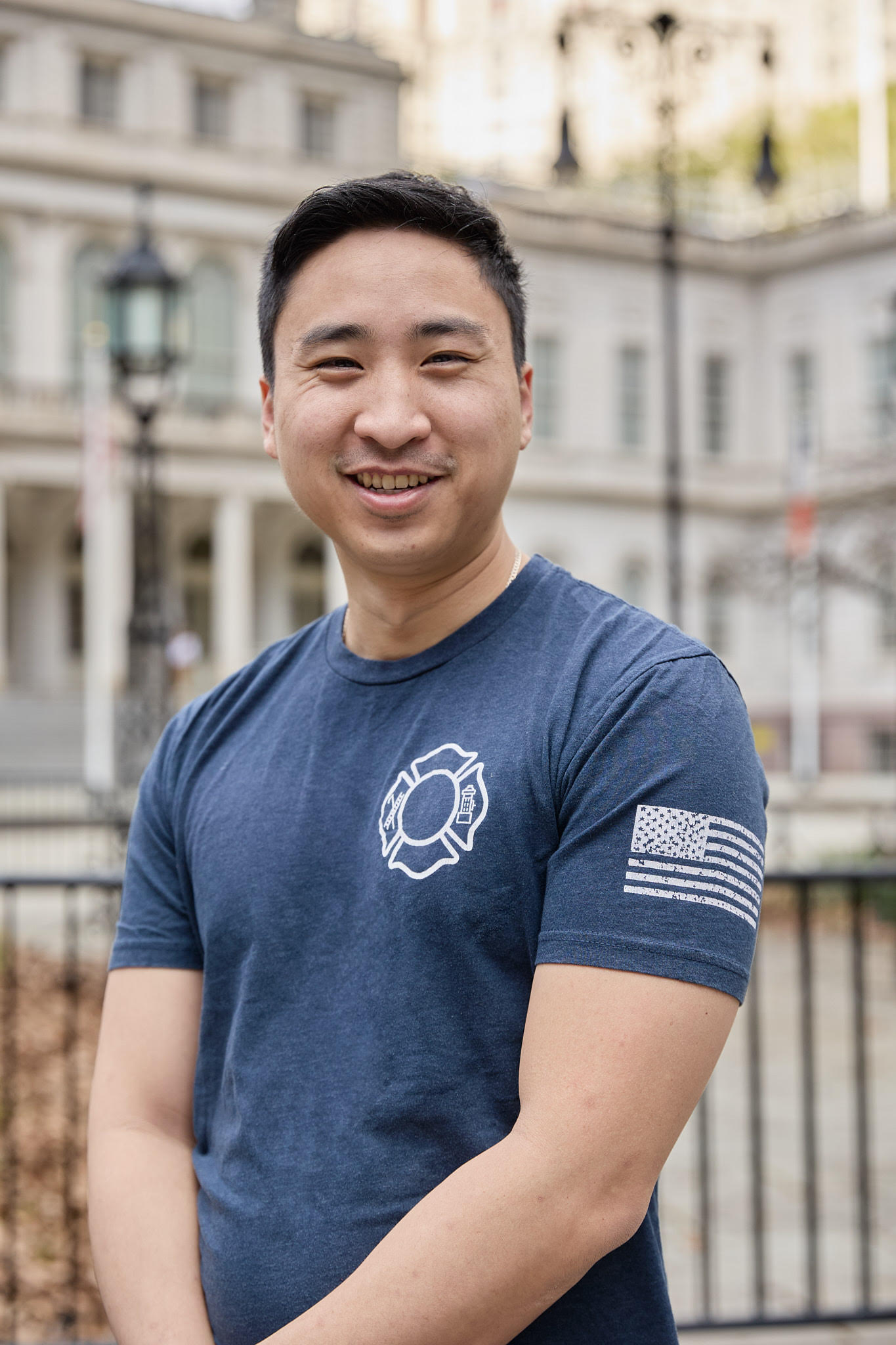
| | Majority party | Minority party |
|---|---|---|
| Candidate | Vickie Paladino | Benjamin Chou |
| Party | Republican | Democratic |
| Alliance | Conservative |
| Popular vote | 24,285 | 17,654 |
| Percentage | 57.9% | 42.1% |
Councilmember before election
Vickie Paladino
Republican
Elected Councilmember
Vickie Paladino
Republican

=== Republican primary ===
==== Declared ====
- Vickie Paladino, incumbent councilmember

==== Endorsements ====
Vickie Paladino

Labor unions

- Council of School Supervisors & Administrators

=== Democratic primary ===
==== Declared ====
- Alexander Caruso, substitute teacher and political organizer
- Benjamin Chou, firefighter

==== Endorsements ====
Alexander Caruso

Individuals

- Ana Maria Archila, activist and co-director of the New York Working Families Party

Organizations

- Working Families Party

==== Results ====
Democratic primary results
| Party | Candidate | Votes | % |
|---|---|---|---|
| Democratic | Benjamin Chou | 7,731 | 67.1 |
| Democratic | Alexander Caruso | 3,775 | 32.3 |
| Write-in | | 69 | 0.6 |
| Total votes | | 11,575 | 100.0 |

=== General election ===
==== Results ====
2025 New York City's 19th City Council district election
| Party | Candidate | Votes | % |
|---|---|---|---|
| Republican | Vickie Paladino | 21,897 | 52.17% |
| Conservative | Vickie Paladino | 2,388 | 5.69% |
| Total | Vickie Paladino (incumbent) | 24,285 | 57.86% |
| Democratic | Benjamin Chou | 17,654 | 42.06% |
| Write-in | | 30 | 0.07% |
| Total votes | | 41,969 | 100.0% |
| Republican hold | | | |

== District 20 ==
2025 New York City Council 20th district election
- November 4, 2025
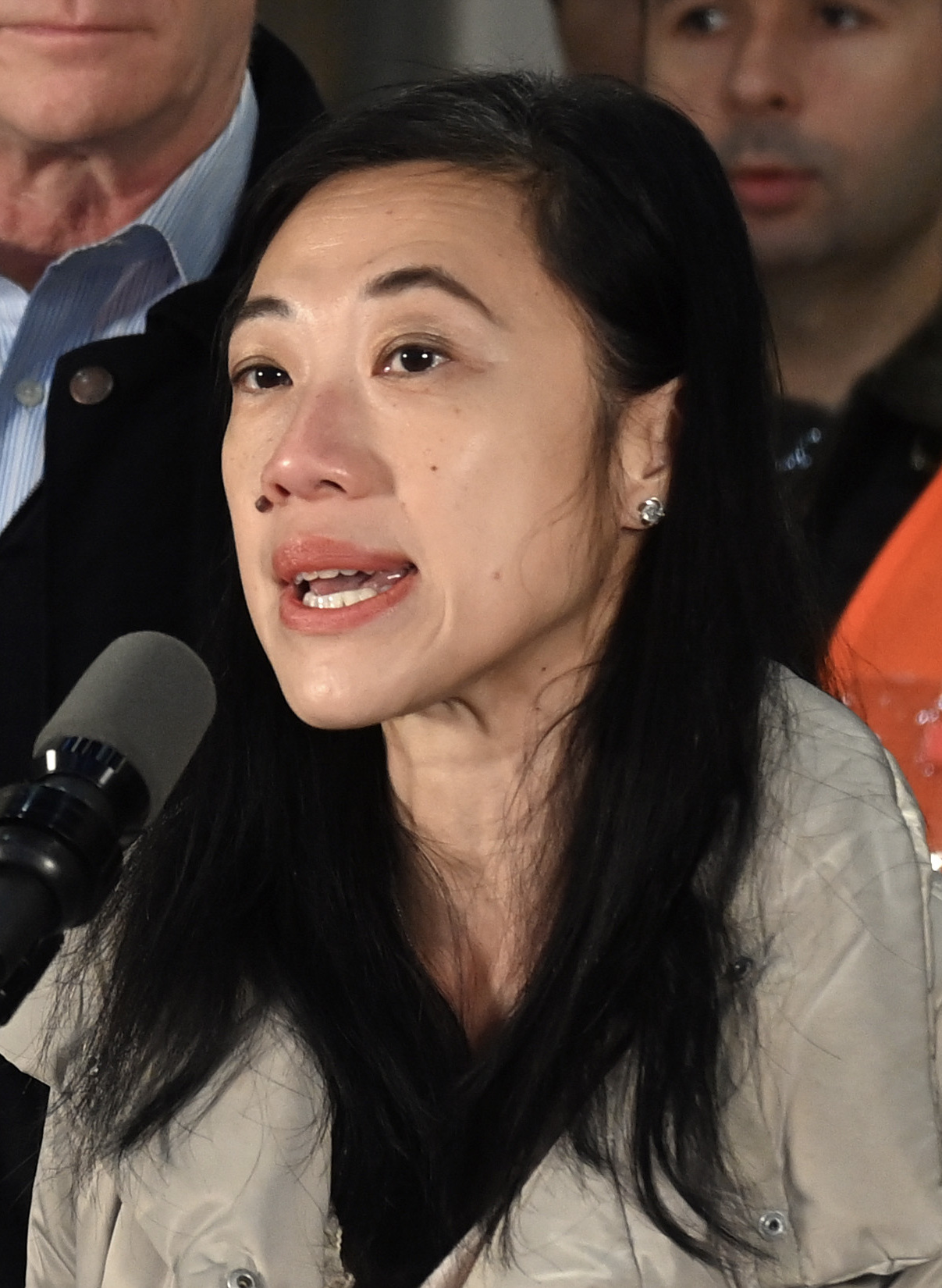

| | Majority party | Minority party |
|---|---|---|
| Candidate | Sandra Ung | Allen Wang |
| Party | Democratic | Conservative |
| Popular vote | 14,566 | 3,278 |
| Percentage | 75.2% | 16.9% |
Councilmember before election
Sandra Ung
Democratic
Elected Councilmember
Sandra Ung
Democratic

=== Democratic primary ===
==== Declared ====
- Sandra Ung, incumbent Councilmember

==== Endorsements ====
Sandra Ung

Labor unions

- 1199SEIU United Healthcare Workers East
- Communications Workers of America District 1
- Council of School Supervisors & Administrators
- District Council 37
- Hotel Trades Council
- International Union of Painters and Allied Trades District Council 9
- LiUNA! New York
- New York City Central Labor Council
- New York State Nurses Association
- NYC District Council of Carpenters
- SEIU 32BJ
- United Federation of Teachers

Organizations

- New York League of Conservation Voters
- Planned Parenthood of Greater New York Action Fund

=== Republican primary ===
==== Disqualified ====
- Joseph Chou, independent candidate for New York's 6th congressional district in 2024
- Allen Wang, security manager, military veteran and former NYPD Officer

==== Endorsements ====
Allen Wang (disqualified)

Organizations

- Conservative Party of New York

=== General election ===
==== Results ====
2025 New York City's 20th City Council district election
| Party | Candidate | Votes | % |
|---|---|---|---|
| Democratic | Sandra Ung (incumbent) | 14,566 | 75.15% |
| Conservative | Allen Wang | 3,278 | 16.91% |
| Asians United/F.A.F.O. | Joseph Chou | 865 | 4.46% |
| Patriot Party | Steven Wang | 601 | 3.10% |
| Write-in | | 72 | 0.37% |
| Total votes | | 19,382 | 100.0% |
| Democratic hold | | | |

== District 21 ==
2025 New York City Council 21st district election
- November 4, 2025
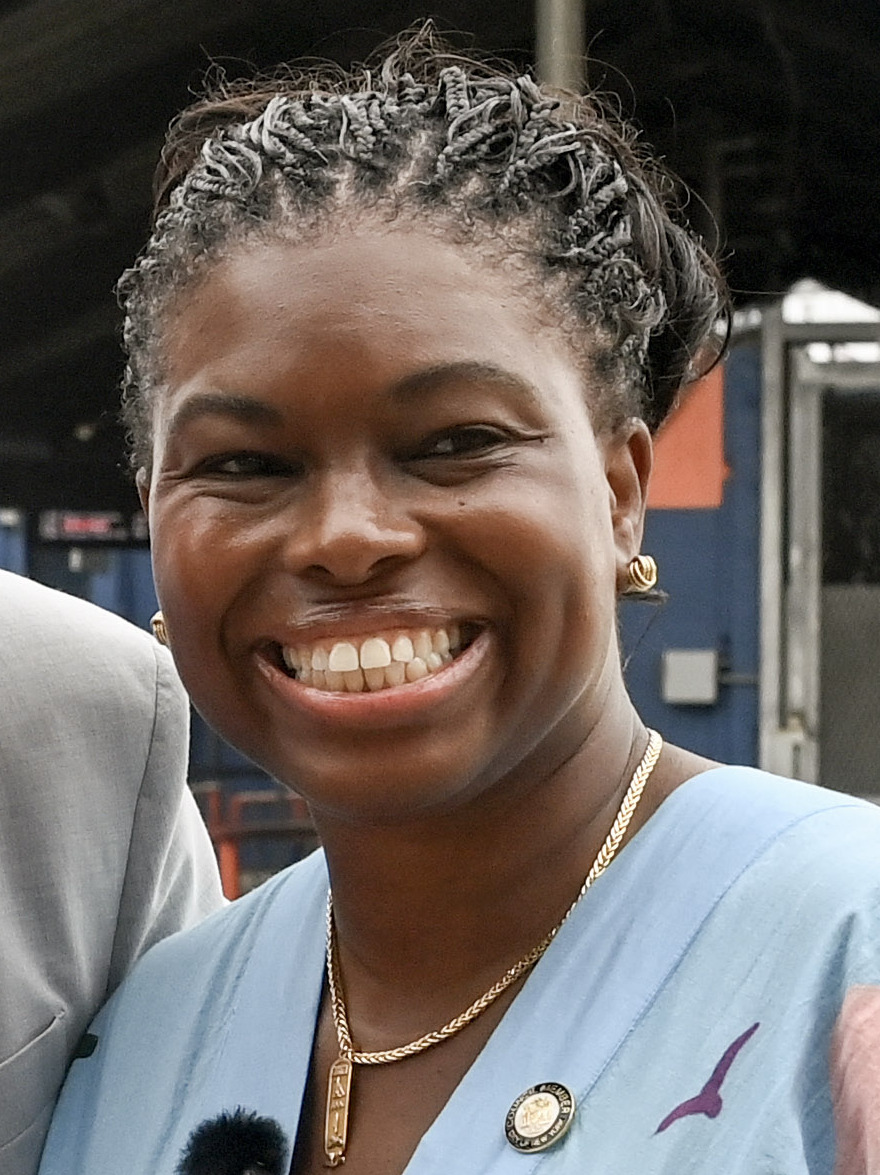

| | Majority party | Minority party |
|---|---|---|
| Candidate | Shanel Thomas-Henry | Giovanni Franco |
| Party | Democratic | Republican |
| Alliance | Working Families | Conservative |
| Popular vote | 11,940 | 3,714 |
| Percentage | 76.1% | 23.7% |
Councilmember before election
Francisco Moya
Democratic
Elected Councilmember
Shanel Thomas-Henry
Democratic

=== Democratic primary ===
==== Declared ====
- David Aiken, State Democrats Committee Member AD 35 (2018–present) and candidate for this seat in 2021
- Yanna Henriquez, nonprofit worker
- Erycka Montoya, intergovernmental affairs employee for the New York City Council
- Shanel Thomas-Henry, member of Queens Community Board 3

==== Disqualified ====
- Hiram Monserrate, former Councilmember for this district (2002–2008), former state senator for the 13th district (2009–2010), and disqualified candidate for this district in 2023
- Sandro Navarro, district director for state senator Jessica Ramos

==== Endorsements ====
David Aiken

State legislators

- Hiram Monserrate, former state senator from the 13th district (2009-2010) and disqualified candidate for this seat
Yanna Henriquez

Labor unions

- United Federation of Teachers

Organizations

- Queens Democratic Party (first choice)
Erycka Montoya

U.S. representatives

- Alexandria Ocasio-Cortez, U.S. Representative from New York's 14th congressional district (2019–present)

State legislators

- Catalina Cruz, State Assemblymember from the 39th district (2019–present)
- Jessica González-Rojas, State Assemblymember from the 34th district (2021–present)

Individuals

- Ana Maria Archila, activist and co-director of the New York Working Families Party (first choice)
- John Avlon, journalist and board chair of Citizens Union

Labor unions

- 1199SEIU United Healthcare Workers East (first choice)

Organizations

- Citizen Action of New York
- Citizens Union
- Jews for Racial and Economic Justice (first choice)
- Make the Road Action (first choice)
- Stonewall Democratic Club of New York
- Working Families Party (first choice)
Sandro Navarro (disqualified)

State legislators

- Jessica Ramos, State Senator from the 13th district (2019–present)

Individuals

- Ana Maria Archila, activist and co-director of the New York Working Families Party (second choice co-endorsement with Thomas-Henry)

Labor unions

- 1199SEIU United Healthcare Workers East (second choice)

Organizations

- Make the Road Action (second choice co-endorsement with Thomas-Henry)
- Jim Owles Liberal Democratic Club
- Working Families Party (second choice co-endorsement with Thomas-Henry)
Shanel Thomas-Henry

State legislators

- Jeffrion Aubry, former State Assemblymember from the 35th district (1992–2024)
- Jessica Ramos, State Senator from the 13th district (2019–present) (previously endorsed Navarro)

Individuals

- Ana Maria Archila, activist and co-director of the New York Working Families Party (second choice co-endorsement with Navarro)

Labor unions

- District Council 37

Organizations

- Jews for Racial and Economic Justice (second choice)
- Jobs for New York
- Make the Road Action (second choice co-endorsement with Navarro)
- Queens Democratic Party (second choice)
- Working Families Party (second choice co-endorsement with Navarro)
Declined to endorse

Labor unions

- New York City Central Labor Council

==== Results ====
Democratic primary results (unofficial until certified)
| Party | Candidate | Maximum round | Maximum votes | Share in maximum round | Maximum votes First round votes Transfer votes |
|---|---|---|---|---|---|
| Democratic | Shanel Thomas-Henry | 4 | 3,090 | 53.2% | |
| Democratic | Erycka Montoya | 4 | 2,717 | 46.8% | |
| Democratic | Yanna Henriquez | 3 | 1,928 | 27.9% | |
| Democratic | David Aiken | 2 | 1,552 | 20.1% | |
| Write-in | | 1 | 64 | 0.8% | |

=== Republican primary ===
==== Declared ====
- Giovanni Enrique Franco

=== General election ===
==== Results ====
2025 New York City's 21st City Council district election
| Party | Candidate | Votes | % |
|---|---|---|---|
| Democratic | Shanel Thomas-Henry | 10,647 | 67.82% |
| Working Families | Shanel Thomas-Henry | 1,293 | 8.24% |
| Total | Shanel Thomas-Henry | 11,940 | 76.06% |
| Republican | Giovanni Franco | 3,308 | 21.07% |
| United Alliance | Giovanni Franco | 406 | 2.59% |
| Total | Giovanni Franco | 3,714 | 23.66% |
| Write-in | | 44 | 0.28% |
| Total votes | | 15,698 | 100.0% |
| Democratic hold | | | |

== District 22 ==
2025 New York City Council 22nd district election
- November 4, 2025
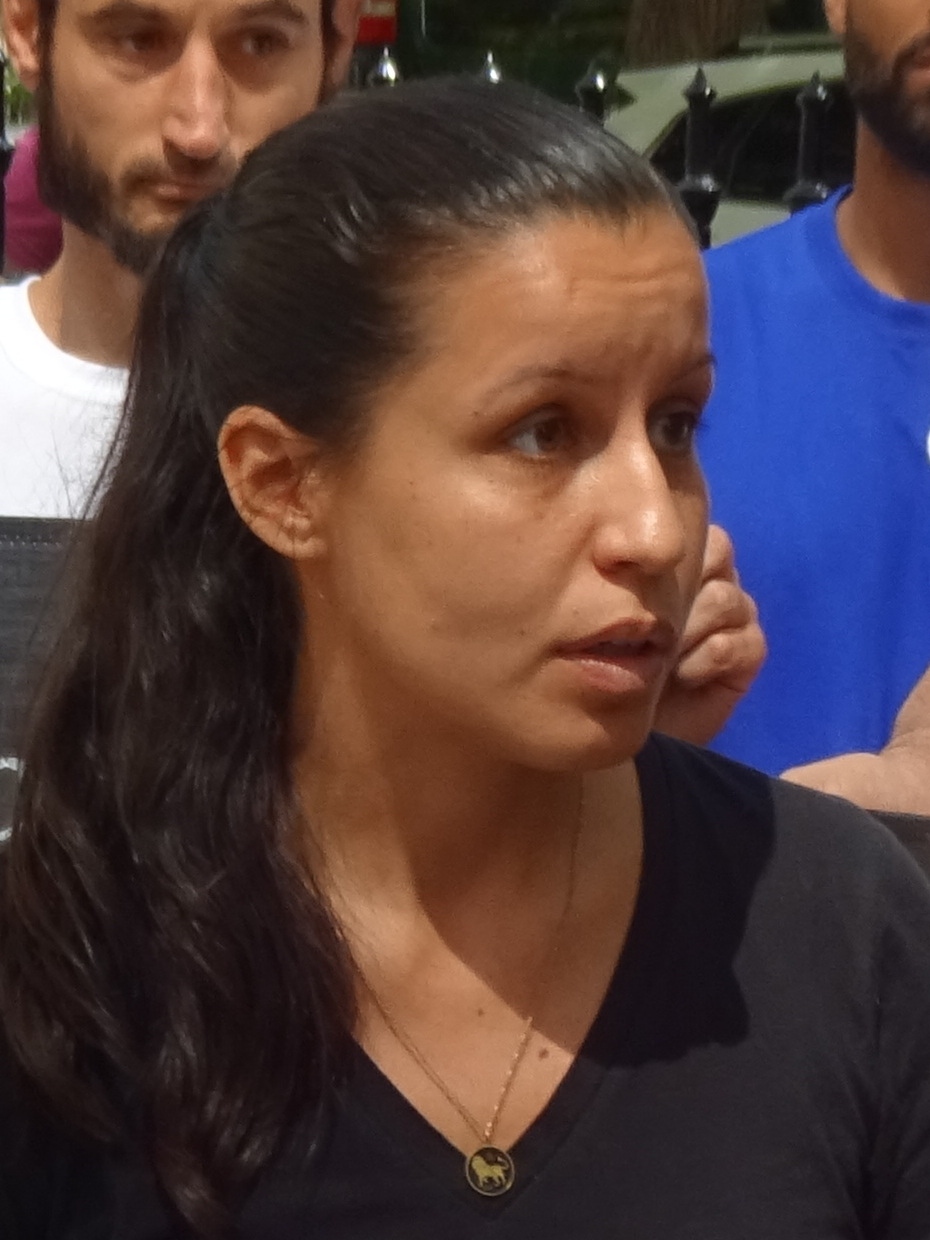
| | Majority party |
|---|---|
| Candidate | Tiffany Cabán |
| Party | Democratic |
| Alliance | Working Families |
| Popular vote | 35,420 |
| Percentage | 97.3% |
Councilmember before election
Tiffany Cabán
Democratic
Elected Councilmember
Tiffany Cabán
Democratic

=== Democratic primary ===
==== Declared ====
- Tiffany Cabán, incumbent Councilmenber

==== Endorsements ====
Tiffany Cabán

Individuals

- Ana Maria Archila, activist and co-director of the New York Working Families Party

Labor unions

- 1199SEIU United Healthcare Workers East
- Communications Workers of America District 1
- Council of School Supervisors & Administrators
- District Council 37
- Hotel Trades Council
- International Union of Painters and Allied Trades District Council 9
- LiUNA! New York
- New York City Central Labor Council
- New York State Nurses Association
- NYC District Council of Carpenters
- Professional Staff Congress
- SEIU 32BJ
- United Federation of Teachers

Organizations

- Jim Owles Liberal Democratic Club
- LGBTQ+ Victory Fund
- Make the Road Action
- New York City Democratic Socialists of America
- Planned Parenthood of Greater New York Action Fund
- Sunrise Movement NYC
- Working Families Party

=== General election ===
==== Results ====
2025 New York City's 22nd City Council district election
| Party | Candidate | Votes | % |
|---|---|---|---|
| Democratic | Tiffany Cabán | 26,684 | 73.28% |
| Working Families | Tiffany Cabán | 8,736 | 23.99% |
| Total | Tiffany Cabán (incumbent) | 35,420 | 97.28% |
| Write-in | | 992 | 2.72% |
| Total votes | | 36,412 | 100.0% |
| Democratic hold | | | |

== District 23 ==
2025 New York City Council 23rd district election
- November 4, 2025
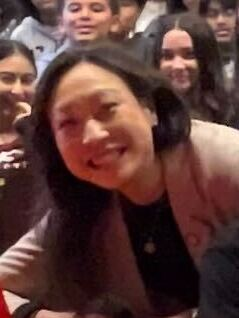

| | Majority party | Minority party |
|---|---|---|
| Candidate | Linda Lee | Bernard Chow |
| Party | Democratic | Conservative |
| Popular vote | 29,154 | 7,332 |
| Percentage | 79.7% | 20.0% |
Councilmember before election
Linda Lee
Democratic
Elected Councilmember
Linda Lee
Democratic

=== Democratic primary ===
==== Declared ====
- Linda Lee, incumbent Councilmember

==== Endorsements ====
Linda Lee

Labor unions

- 1199SEIU United Healthcare Workers East
- Council of School Supervisors & Administrators
- International Union of Painters and Allied Trades District Council 9
- LiUNA! New York
- New York City Central Labor Council
- New York State Nurses Association
- NYC District Council of Carpenters
- United Federation of Teachers

Organizations

- New York League of Conservation Voters
- Planned Parenthood of Greater New York Action Fund
- Stonewall Democratic Club of New York

=== Republican primary ===
==== Disqualified ====
- Bernard Chow, landlord

=== General election ===
==== Results ====
2025 New York City's 23rd City Council district election
| Party | Candidate | Votes | % |
|---|---|---|---|
| Democratic | Linda Lee (incumbent) | 29,154 | 79.70% |
| Conservative | Bernard Chow | 7,332 | 20.04% |
| Write-in | | 95 | 0.26% |
| Total votes | | 36,581 | 100.0% |
| Democratic hold | | | |

== District 24 ==
2025 New York City Council 24th district election
- November 4, 2025
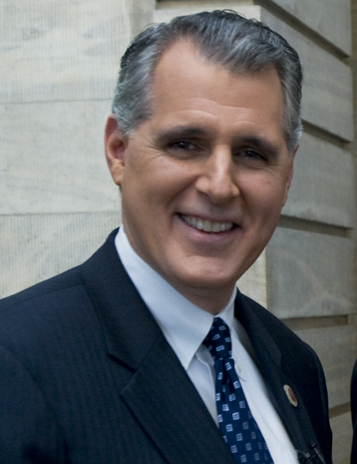
| | Majority party |
|---|---|
| Candidate | James Gennaro |
| Party | Democratic |
| Popular vote | 27,762 |
| Percentage | 98.3% |
Councilmember before election
James F. Gennaro
Democratic
Elected Councilmember
James F. Gennaro
Democratic

=== Democratic primary ===
==== Declared ====
- James F. Gennaro, incumbent Councilmember

==== Endorsements ====
James F. Gennaro

Labor unions

- Communications Workers of America District 1
- District Council 37
- Hotel Trades Council
- International Union of Painters and Allied Trades District Council 9
- LiUNA! New York
- New York State Nurses Association
- SEIU 32BJ
- United Federation of Teachers

Organizations

- New York League of Conservation Voters

=== General election ===
==== Results ====
2025 New York City's 24th City Council district election
| Party | Candidate | Votes | % |
|---|---|---|---|
| Democratic | James F. Gennaro (incumbent) | 27,762 | 98.30% |
| Write-in | | 481 | 1.70% |
| Total votes | | 28,243 | 100.0% |
| Democratic hold | | | |

== District 25 ==
2025 New York City Council 25th district election
- November 4, 2025
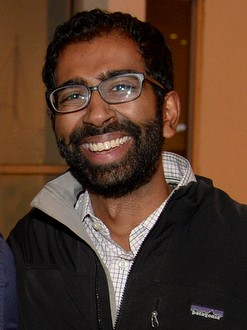

| | Majority party | Minority party |
|---|---|---|
| Candidate | Shekar Krishnan | Ramses Frias |
| Party | Democratic | Republican |
| Alliance | Working Families | Conservative |
| Popular vote | 21,082 | 6,094 |
| Percentage | 69.7% | 20.1% |
Councilmember before election
Shekar Krishnan
Democratic
Elected Councilmember
Shekar Krishnan
Democratic

=== Democratic primary ===
==== Declared ====
- Shekar Krishnan, incumbent Councilmember
- Ricardo Pacheco, retired NYPD officer

==== Withdrawn ====
- Mac Merchan, member of Queens Community Board 4 (2022–present)

==== Endorsements ====
Shekar Krishnan

U.S. representatives

- Alexandria Ocasio-Cortez, U.S. Representative from New York's 14th congressional district (2019–present)

Local officials

- Brad Lander, New York City Comptroller (2022–present)

Individuals

- Ana Maria Archila, activist and co-director of the New York Working Families Party

Labor unions

- 1199SEIU United Healthcare Workers East
- Council of School Supervisors & Administrators
- LiUNA! New York
- New York City Central Labor Council
- New York State Nurses Association
- NYC District Council of Carpenters
- Professional Staff Congress
- United Federation of Teachers

Organizations

- Make the Road Action
- New York City Council Progressive Caucus Alliance
- New York League of Conservation Voters
- Planned Parenthood of Greater New York Action Fund
- Stonewall Democratic Club of New York
- Working Families Party

==== Results ====
Democratic primary results
| Party | Candidate | Votes | % |
|---|---|---|---|
| Democratic | Shekar Krishnan (incumbent) | 9,282 | 67.3 |
| Democratic | Ricardo Pacheco | 4,420 | 32.0 |
| Write-in | | 99 | 0.7 |
| Total votes | | 13,801 | 100.0 |

=== Republican primary ===
==== Declared ====
- Ramses Frias, community activist

==== Disqualified ====
- Shah Haque, nominee for this district in 2021

==== Withdrawn ====
- Abubakar Ashiq, paralegal

==== Endorsements ====
Ramses Frias

Organizations

- New York Young Republican Club

=== General election ===
==== Results ====
2025 New York City's 25th City Council district election
| Party | Candidate | Votes | % |
|---|---|---|---|
| Democratic | Shekar Krishnan | 17,885 | 59.12% |
| Working Families | Shekar Krishnan | 3,197 | 10.57% |
| Total | Shekar Krishnan (incumbent) | 21,082 | 69.69% |
| Republican | Ramses Frias | 5,570 | 18.41% |
| Conservative | Ramses Frias | 524 | 1.73% |
| Total | Ramses Frias | 6,094 | 20.14% |
| Safe&Affordable | Ricardo Pacheco (Note: Shared with "Stop the Casino" ballot line.) | 1,849 | 6.11% |
| Asians United | Shah Haque | 1,127 | 3.73% |
| Write-in | | 100 | 0.33% |
| Total votes | | 30,252 | 100.0% |
| Democratic hold | | | |

== District 26 ==
2025 New York City Council 26th district election
- November 4, 2025
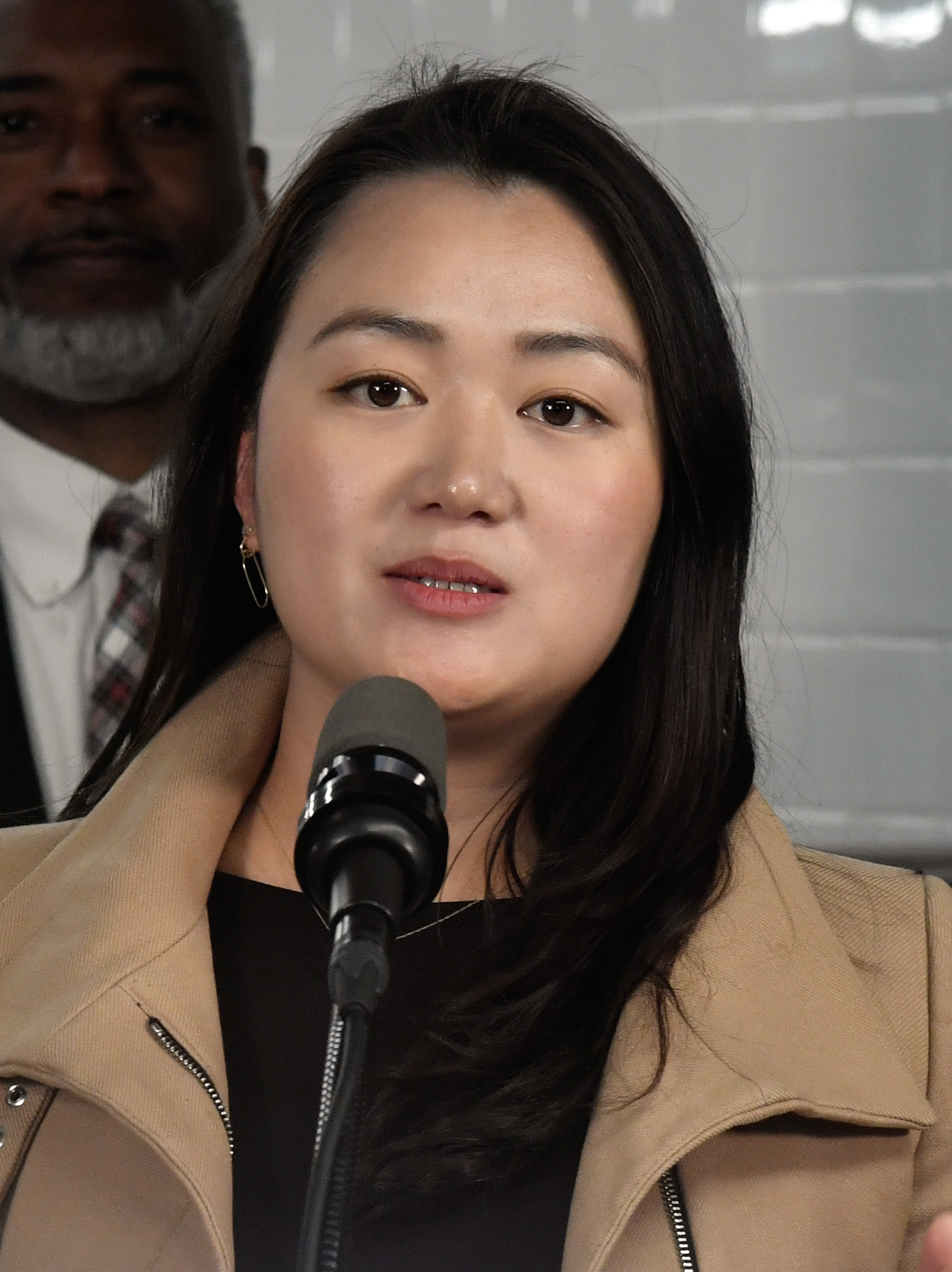

| | Majority party | Minority party |
|---|---|---|
| Candidate | Julie Won | John Healy |
| Party | Democratic | Republican |
| Alliance | | Conservative |
| Popular vote | 31,091 | 7,094 |
| Percentage | 81.1% | 18.5% |
Councilmember before election
Julie Won
Democratic
Elected Councilmember
Julie Won
Democratic

=== Democratic primary ===
==== Declared ====
- Julie Won, incumbent Councilmember

==== Endorsements ====
Julie Won

Individuals

- Ana Maria Archila, activist and co-director of the New York Working Families Party

Labor unions

- 1199SEIU United Healthcare Workers East
- Communications Workers of America District 1
- Council of School Supervisors & Administrators
- District Council 37
- LiUNA! New York
- New York City Central Labor Council
- New York State Nurses Association
- NYC District Council of Carpenters
- United Federation of Teachers

Organizations

- Jim Owles Liberal Democratic Club
- New York City Council Progressive Caucus Alliance
- Planned Parenthood of Greater New York Action Fund
- Stonewall Democratic Club of New York
- Working Families Party

=== Republican primary ===
==== Declared ====
- John Healy

==== Endorsements ====
John Healy

Organizations

- New York Young Republican Club

=== General election ===
==== Results ====
2025 New York City's 26th City Council district election
| Party | Candidate | Votes | % |
|---|---|---|---|
| Democratic | Julie Won (incumbent) | 31,091 | 81.12% |
| Republican | John Healy | 6,244 | 16.29% |
| Conservative | John Healy | 850 | 2.22% |
| Total | John Healy | 7,094 | 18.51% |
| Write-in | | 144 | 0.38% |
| Total votes | | 38,329 | 100.0% |
| Democratic hold | | | |

== District 27 ==
2025 New York City Council 27th district election
- November 4, 2025
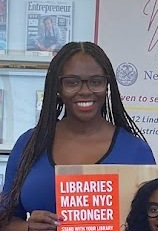
| | Majority party |
|---|---|
| Candidate | Nantasha Williams |
| Party | Democratic |
| Popular vote | 29,248 |
| Percentage | 99.4% |
Councilmember before election
Nantasha Williams
Democratic
Elected Councilmember
Nantasha Williams
Democratic

=== Democratic primary ===
==== Declared ====
- Nantasha Williams, incumbent Councilmember

==== Disqualified ====
- Vera Daniels, wellness coach

==== Endorsements ====
Nantasha Williamns

Labor unions

- 1199SEIU United Healthcare Workers East
- Communications Workers of America District 1
- Council of School Supervisors & Administrators
- District Council 37
- Hotel Trades Council
- International Union of Painters and Allied Trades District Council 9
- LiUNA! New York
- New York State Nurses Association
- NYC District Council of Carpenters
- Professional Staff Congress
- SEIU 32BJ
- United Federation of Teachers

Organizations

- New York City Council Progressive Caucus Alliance
- New York League of Conservation Voters

=== General election ===
==== Results ====
2025 New York City's 27th City Council district election
| Party | Candidate | Votes | % |
|---|---|---|---|
| Democratic | Nantasha Williams (incumbent) | 29,248 | 99.45% |
| Write-in | | 163 | 0.55% |
| Total votes | | 29,411 | 100.0% |
| Democratic hold | | | |

== District 28 ==
2025 New York City Council 28th district election
- November 4, 2025
| | Majority party |
|---|---|
| Candidate | Ty Hankerson |
| Party | Democratic |
| Alliance | Working Families |
| Popular vote | 23,356 |
| Percentage | 99.4% |
Councilmember before election
Adrienne Adams
Democratic
Elected Councilmember
Ty Hankerson
Democratic

=== Democratic primary ===
==== Declared ====
- Ty Hankerson, district chief of staff to councilmember Adrienne Adams
- Romeo Hitlall, real estate broker and member of Queens Community Board 10 (2008–present)
- Latoya LeGrand, aide to State Assemblymember Vivian E. Cook and member of Queens Community Board 12 (2021–present)
- Japneet Singh, assurance associate, candidate for New York's 15th State Senate district in 2022, and candidate for this district in 2021
- Ruben Wills, former Councilmember (2011–2017)

==== Endorsements ====
Ty Hankerson

U.S. representatives

- Gregory Meeks, U.S. representative from New York's 5th congressional district (1998–present)

State legislators

- Kenny Burgos, former State Assemblymember from the 85th district (2020–2024)

Local officials

- Adrienne Adams, Speaker of the New York City Council (2022–present) from the 28th district (2018–present)
- Chris Banks, City Councilmember from the 42nd district (2024–present)
- Selvena Brooks-Powers, Majority Whip of the New York City Council (2021–present) from the 31st district (2022–present)
- Amanda Farías, Majority Leader of the New York City Council (2024–present) from the 18th district (2022–present)
- Kamillah Hanks, City Councilmember from the 49th district (2022–present)
- Crystal Hudson, City Councilmember from the 35th district (2022–present)
- Rita Joseph, City Councilmember from the 40th district (2022–present)
- Mercedes Narcisse, City Councilmember from the 46th district (2022–present)
- Donovan Richards, Queens Borough President (2020–present)
- Kevin Riley, City Councilmember from the 12th district (2021–present)
- Yusef Salaam, City Councilmember from the 9th district (2024–present)
- Jumaane Williams, New York City Public Advocate (2019–present)

Individuals

- Ana Maria Archila, activist and co-director of the New York Working Families Party (co-endorsement with LeGrand)
- John Avlon, journalist and board chair of Citizens Union (first choice)

Labor unions

- 1199SEIU United Healthcare Workers East
- Communications Workers of America District 1
- Communications Workers of America Local 1180
- Council of School Supervisors & Administrators
- District Council 37
- Hotel Trades Council
- New York City Central Labor Council
- New York State Nurses Association
- Professional Staff Congress (first choice)
- SEIU 32BJ
- United Federation of Teachers

Organizations

- Citizens Union (first choice)
- Jews for Racial and Economic Justice (first or second choice co-endorsement with LeGrand)
- Queens Democratic Party
- Working Families Party (co-endorsement with LeGrand)
Romeo Hitlall

State legislators

- Joseph Addabbo Jr., state senator from the 15th district (2009-present)
- Jenifer Rajkumar, state assemblymember from the 38th district (2021-present)

Individuals

- John Avlon, journalist and board chair of Citizens Union (third choice)
- Terry Gajraj, singer

Organizations

- Citizens Union (third choice)
Latoya LeGrand

State legislators

- Khaleel Anderson, state assemblymember from the 31st district (2020-present)
- Vivian Cook, state assemblymember from the 32nd district (1991-present)
- James Sanders Jr., state senator from the 15th district (2009-present)

Individuals

- Ana Maria Archila, activist and co-director of the New York Working Families Party (co-endorsement with Hankerson)

Labor unions

- Professional Staff Congress (second choice)

Organizations

- Citizen Action of New York
- Jews for Racial and Economic Justice (first or second choice co-endorsement with Hankerson)
- Working Families Party (co-endorsement with Hankerson)
Japneet Singh

State legislators

- John Liu, state senator from the 16th district (2019-present)

Individuals

- John Avlon, journalist and board chair of Citizens Union (second choice)

Organizations

- Citizens Union (second choice)

==== Results ====
Democratic primary results (unofficial until certified)
| Party | Candidate | Maximum round | Maximum votes | Share in maximum round | Maximum votes First round votes Transfer votes |
|---|---|---|---|---|---|
| Democratic | Ty Hankerson | 5 | 6,471 | 58.8% | |
| Democratic | Japneet Singh | 5 | 4,529 | 41.2% | |
| Democratic | Latoya LeGrand | 4 | 2,769 | 22.6% | |
| Democratic | Ruben Wills | 3 | 2,076 | 15.6% | |
| Democratic | Romeo Hitlall | 2 | 1,232 | 8.8% | |
| Write-in | | 1 | 66 | 0.5% | |

=== General election ===
==== Results ====
2025 New York City's 28th City Council district election
| Party | Candidate | Votes | % |
|---|---|---|---|
| Democratic | Ty Hankerson | 21,271 | 90.50% |
| Working Families | Ty Hankerson | 2,085 | 8.87% |
| Total | Ty Hankerson | 23,356 | 99.37% |
| Write-in | | 148 | 0.63% |
| Total votes | | 23,504 | 100.0% |
| Democratic hold | | | |

== District 29 ==
2025 New York City Council 29th district election
- November 4, 2025
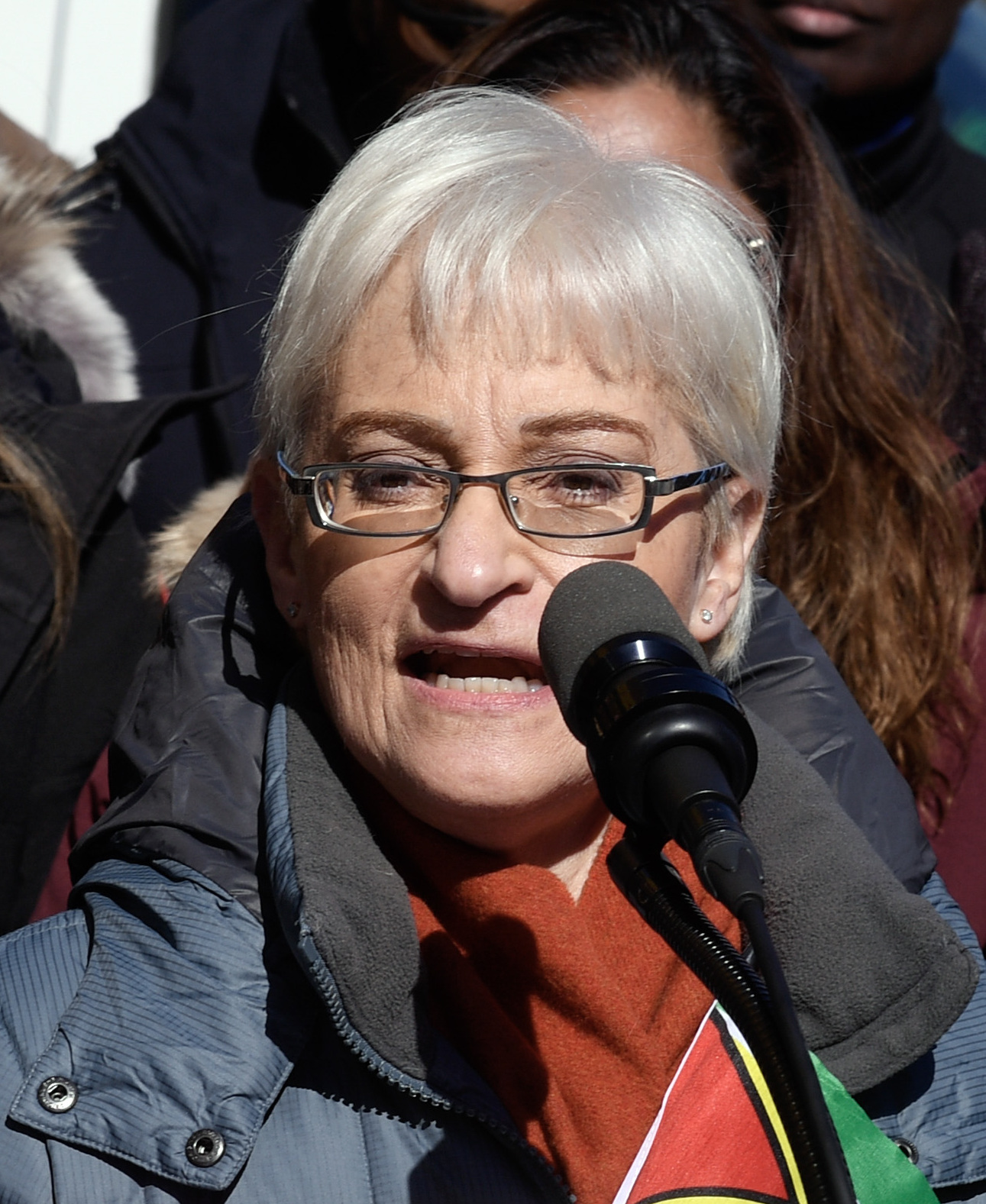

| | Majority party | Minority party |
|---|---|---|
| Candidate | Lynn Schulman | Jonathan Rinaldi |
| Party | Democratic | Republican |
| Popular vote | 26,447 | 10,063 |
| Percentage | 72.2% | 27.5% |
Councilmember before election
Lynn Schulman
Democratic
Elected Councilmember
Lynn Schulman
Democratic

=== Democratic primary ===
==== Declared ====
- Lynn Schulman, incumbent Councilmember

==== Endorsements ====
Lynn Schulman

Labor unions

- 1199SEIU United Healthcare Workers East
- Communications Workers of America District 1
- Council of School Supervisors & Administrators
- District Council 37
- Hotel Trades Council
- International Union of Painters and Allied Trades District Council 9
- LiUNA! New York
- New York City Central Labor Council
- New York State Nurses Association
- NYC District Council of Carpenters
- Professional Staff Congress
- SEIU 32BJ
- United Federation of Teachers

Organizations

- Jim Owles Liberal Democratic Club
- LGBTQ+ Victory Fund
- LPAC
- New York League of Conservation Voters
- Planned Parenthood of Greater New York Action Fund
- Stonewall Democratic Club of New York

=== Republican primary ===
==== Declared ====
- John Rinaldi, perennial candidate

==== Disqualified ====
- Supreet McGrath, product manager

=== General election ===
==== Results ====
2025 New York City's 29th City Council district election
| Party | Candidate | Votes | % |
|---|---|---|---|
| Democratic | Lynn Schulman (incumbent) | 26,447 | 72.16% |
| Republican | Jonathan Rinaldi | 10,063 | 27.46% |
| Write-in | | 141 | 0.38% |
| Total votes | | 36,651 | 100.0% |
| Democratic hold | | | |

== District 30 ==
2025 New York City Council 30th district election
- November 4, 2025
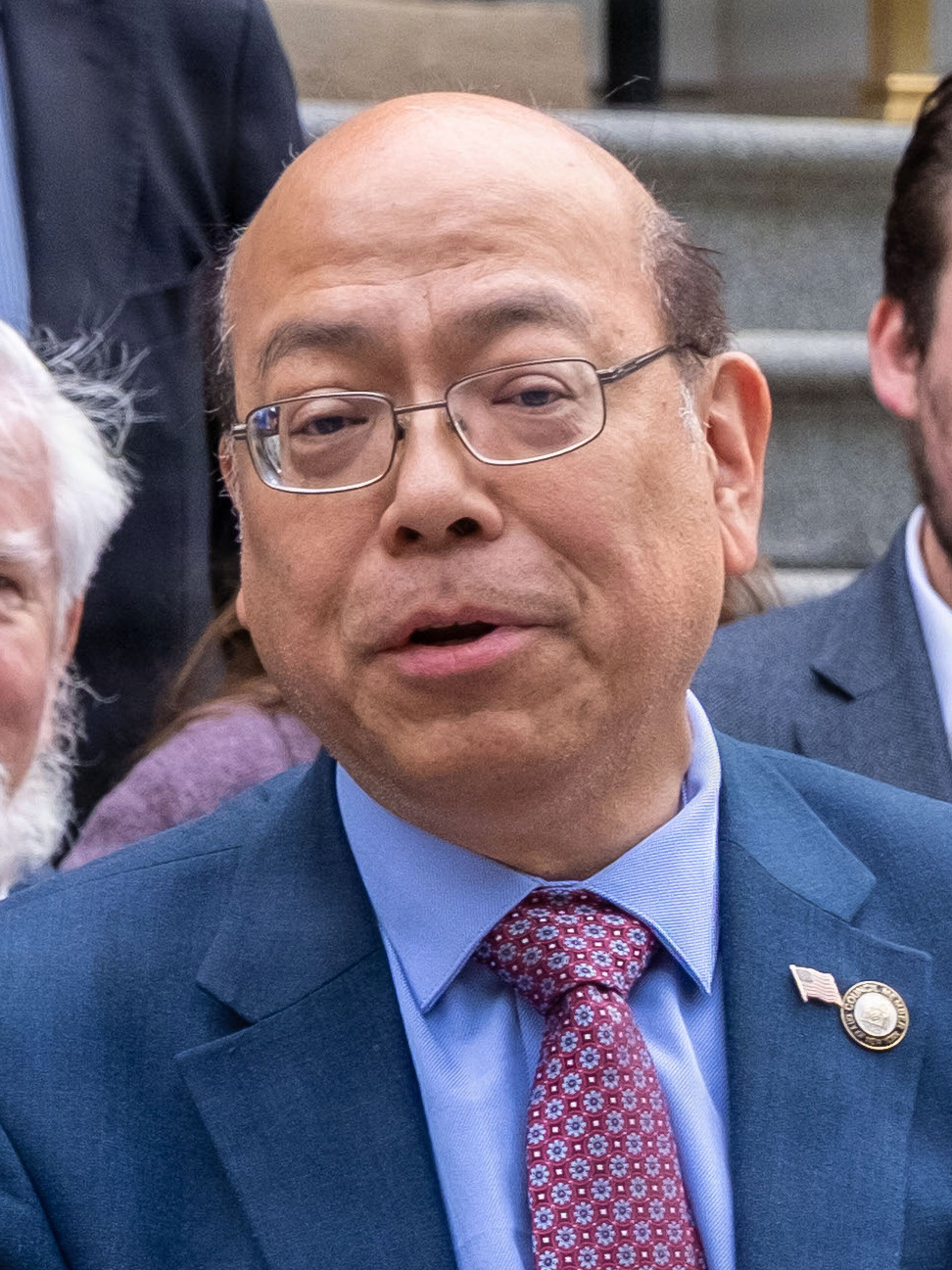

| | Majority party | Minority party |
|---|---|---|
| Candidate | Phil Wong | Alicia Vaichunas |
| Party | Democratic | Republican |
| Alliance | | Conservative |
| Popular vote | 19,320 | 15,668 |
| Percentage | 54.0% | 43.7% |
Councilmember before election
Robert Holden
Democratic
Elected Councilmember
Phil Wong
Democratic

=== Democratic primary ===
==== Declared ====
- Paul Pogozelski, businessman
- Dermot Smyth, teachers' union strategist
- Phil Wong, budget director for Councilmember Robert Holden

==== Endorsements ====
Paul Pogozelski

Individuals

- John Avlon, journalist and board chair of Citizens Union (second choice)

Organizations

- Citizens Union (second choice)
Dermot Smyth

U.S. representatives

- Tom Suozzi, U.S. Representative from New York's 3rd congressional district (2017–2023, 2024–present)

State legislators

- Andrew Hevesi, State Assemblymember from the 28th district (2005–present)
- Alicia Hyndman, State Assemblymember from the 29th district (2016–present)
- Micah Lasher, State Assemblymember from the 69th district (2025–present)

Local officials

- Donovan Richards, Queens Borough President (2020–present)

Individuals

- John Avlon, journalist and board chair of Citizens Union (first choice)
- James Dolan, businessman

Labor unions

- 1199SEIU United Healthcare Workers East
- Communications Workers of America District 1
- Council of School Supervisors & Administrators
- District Council 37
- Hotel Trades Council
- International Union of Painters and Allied Trades District Council 9
- LiUNA! New York
- New York State Nurses Association
- New York City Central Labor Council
- NYC District Council of Carpenters
- SEIU 32BJ
- United Federation of Teachers

Organizations

- Citizens Union (first choice)
- Queens Democratic Party
Phil Wong

Local officials

- Robert Holden, New York City Councilmember from the 30th district (2016–present) (co-endorsement with Vaichunas; Democratic primary only)

Individuals

- Curtis Sliwa, founder of the Guardian Angels and radio talk show host (Republican)

==== Results ====
Democratic primary results
| Party | Candidate | Maximum round | Maximum votes | Share in maximum round | Maximum votes First round votes Transfer votes |
|---|---|---|---|---|---|
| Democratic | Phil Wong | 3 | 5,549 | 51.5% | |
| Democratic | Paul Pogozelski | 3 | 5,233 | 48.5% | |
| Democratic | Dermot Smyth | 2 | 3,963 | 31.2% | |
| Write-in | | 1 | 168 | 1.3% | |

=== Republican primary ===
==== Declared ====
- Alicia Vaichunas, deputy chief of staff for Councilmember Robert Holden

==== Endorsements ====
Alicia Vaichunas

Local officials

- Joann Ariola, Minority Leader of the New York City Council (2025–present) from the 32nd district (2022–present)
- Robert Holden, New York City Councilmember from the 30th district (2016–present) (Democratic) (co-endorsement with Wong; Republican primary only)

Organizations

- Queens Republican Party

=== General election ===
==== Endorsements ====
Declined to endorse

Local officials

- Robert Holden, incumbent New York City Councilmember from the 30th district (2016–present) (co-endorsed Wong in the Democratic primary and Vaichunas in the Republican primary)

==== Results ====
2025 New York City's 30th City Council district election
| Party | Candidate | Votes | % |
|---|---|---|---|
| Democratic | Phil Wong | 19,320 | 53.95% |
| Republican | Alicia Vaichunas | 14,287 | 39.89% |
| Conservative | Alicia Vaichunas | 1,381 | 3.86% |
| Total | Alicia Vaichunas | 15,668 | 43.75% |
| Write-in | | 825 | 2.30% |
| Total votes | | 35,813 | 100.0% |
| Democratic hold | | | |

== District 31 ==
2025 New York City Council 31st district election
- November 4, 2025
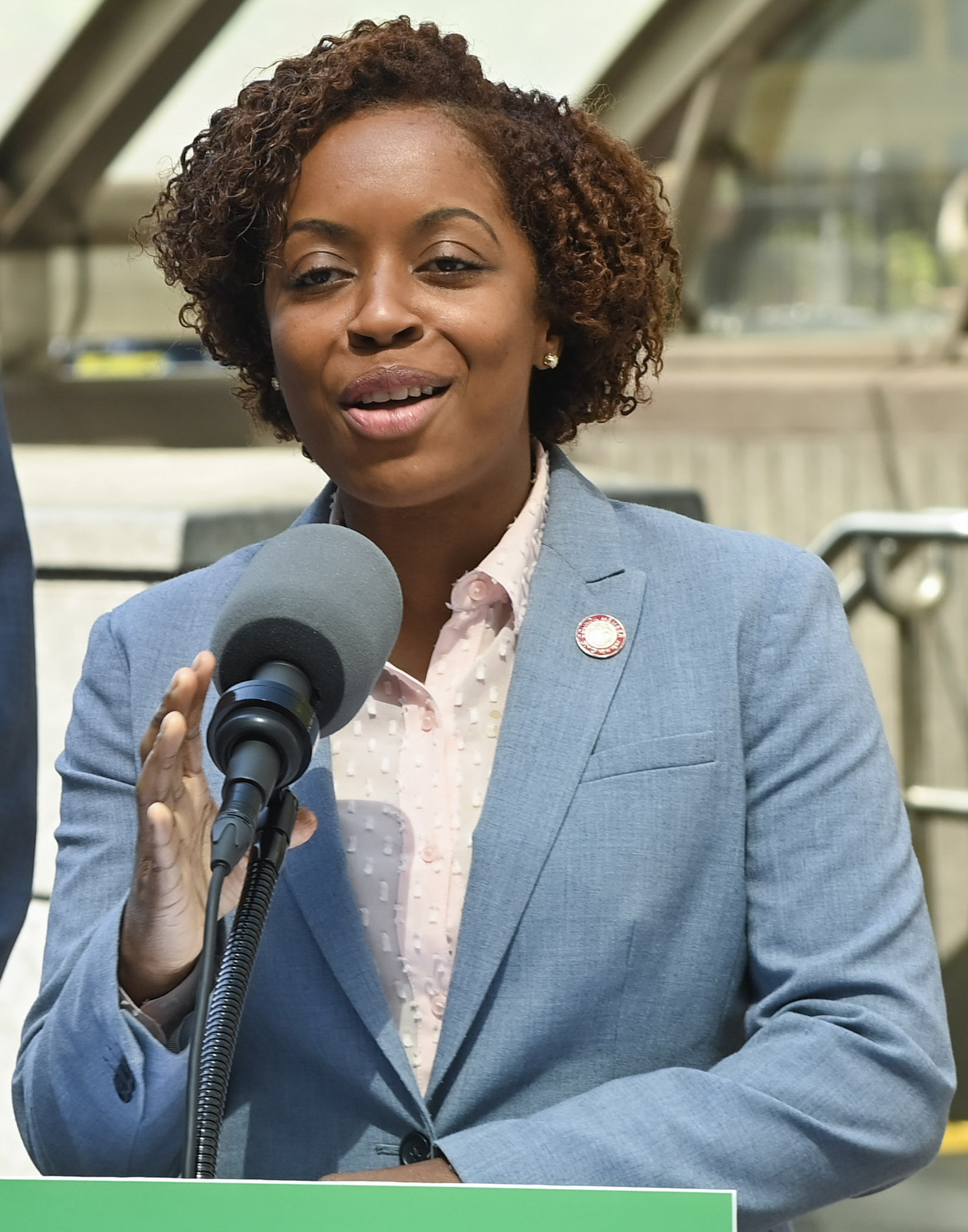
| | Majority party |
|---|---|
| Candidate | Selvena Brooks-Powers |
| Party | Democratic |
| Popular vote | 24,440 |
| Percentage | 99.0% |
Councilmember before election
Selvena Brooks-Powers
Democratic
Elected Councilmember
Selvena Brooks-Powers
Democratic

=== Democratic primary ===
==== Declared ====
- Selvena Brooks-Powers, incumbent Councilmember

==== Endorsements ====
Selvena Brooks-Powers

Labor unions

- 1199SEIU United Healthcare Workers East
- Communications Workers of America District 1
- Council of School Supervisors & Administrators
- District Council 37
- International Union of Painters and Allied Trades District Council 9
- LiUNA! New York
- New York City Central Labor Council
- New York State Nurses Association
- NYC District Council of Carpenters
- United Federation of Teachers

Organizations

- New York League of Conservation Voters
- Planned Parenthood of Greater New York Action Fund

=== General election ===
==== Results ====
2025 New York City's 31st City Council district election
| Party | Candidate | Votes | % |
|---|---|---|---|
| Democratic | Selvena Brooks-Powers (incumbent) | 24,440 | 99.02% |
| Write-in | | 243 | 0.98% |
| Total votes | | 24,683 | 100.0% |
| Democratic hold | | | |

== District 32 ==
2025 New York City Council 32nd district election
- November 4, 2025
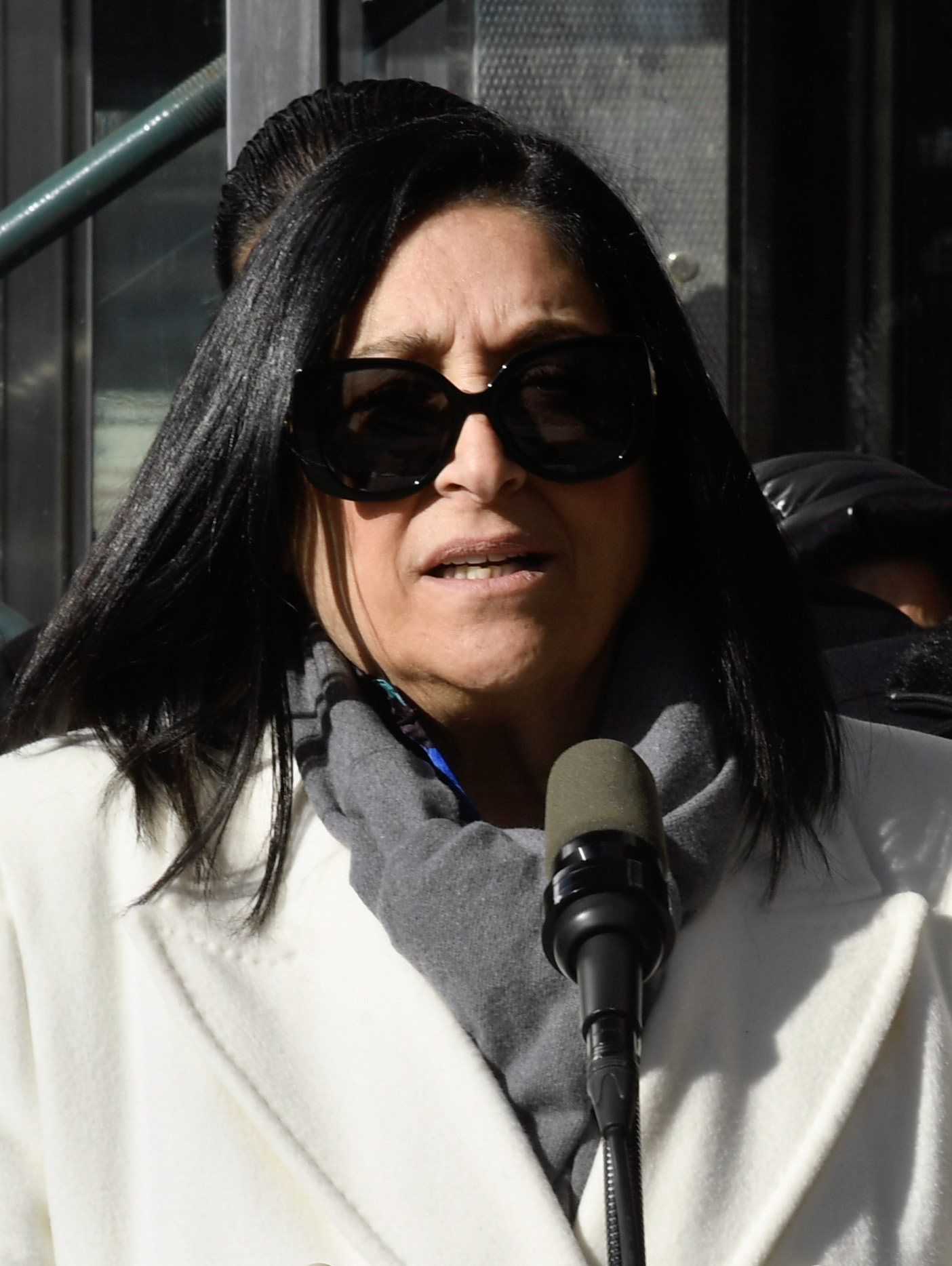
| | Majority party |
|---|---|
| Candidate | Joann Ariola |
| Party | Republican |
| Alliance | Conservative |
| Popular vote | 28,104 |
| Percentage | 97.5% |
Councilmember before election
Joann Ariola
Republican
Elected Councilmember
Joann Ariola
Republican

=== Republican primary ===
==== Potential ====
- Joann Ariola, incumbent Councilmember

==== Endorsements ====
Joann Ariola

Labor unions

- Council of School Supervisors & Administrators
- International Union of Painters and Allied Trades District Council 9
- NYC District Council of Carpenters
- United Federation of Teachers

=== General election ===
==== Results ====
2025 New York City's 32nd City Council district election
| Party | Candidate | Votes | % |
|---|---|---|---|
| Republican | Joann Ariola | 23,616 | 81.90% |
| Conservative | Joann Ariola | 4,488 | 15.56% |
| Total | Joann Ariola (incumbent) | 28,104 | 97.46% |
| Write-in | | 731 | 2.54% |
| Total votes | | 28,835 | 100.0% |
| Republican hold | | | |

== District 33 ==
2025 New York City Council 33rd district election
- November 4, 2025
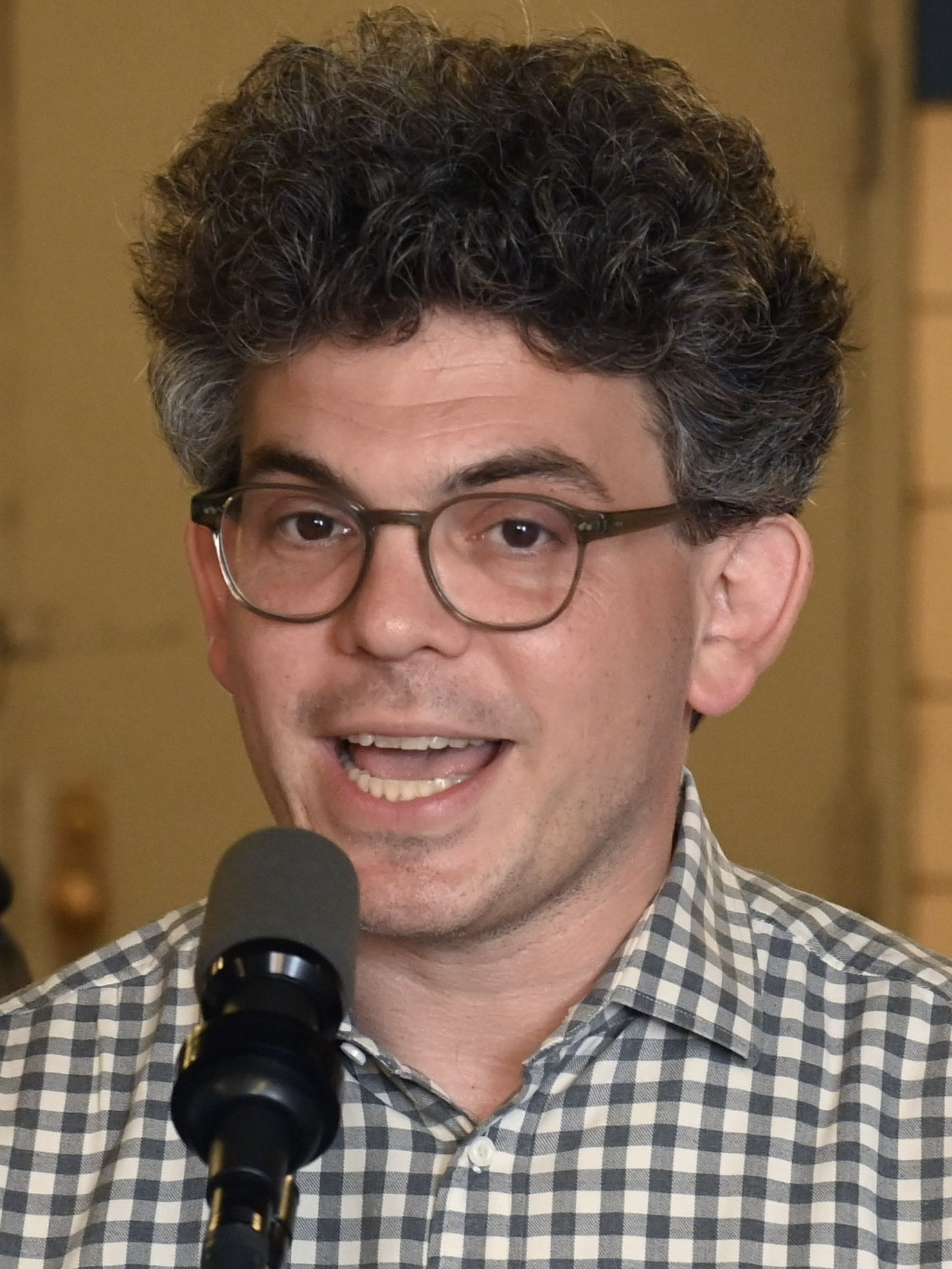
| | Majority party |
|---|---|
| Candidate | Lincoln Restler |
| Party | Democratic |
| Alliance | Working Families |
| Popular vote | 45,912 |
| Percentage | 98.4% |
Councilmember before election
Lincoln Restler
Democratic
Elected Councilmember
Lincoln Restler
Democratic

=== Democratic primary ===
==== Declared ====
- Sabrina Gates, activist and candidate for this district in 2021
- Lincoln Restler, incumbent Councilmember

==== Endorsements ====
Sabrina Gates

State legislators

- Rodneyse Bichotte Hermelyn, State Assemblymember from the 42nd district (2015–present) and Chair of the Brooklyn Democratic Party (2020–present)

Organizations

- Brooklyn Democratic Party
Lincoln Restler

U.S. representatives

- Nydia Velázquez, U.S. representative from New York's 7th congressional district (1993–present)

Local officials

- Brad Lander, New York City Comptroller (2022–present)
- Antonio Reynoso, Brooklyn Borough President (2022–present)

Individuals

- Ana Maria Archila, activist and co-director of the New York Working Families Party

Labor unions

- 1199SEIU United Healthcare Workers East
- Communications Workers of America District 1
- Council of School Supervisors & Administrators
- District Council 37
- Hotel Trades Council
- LiUNA! New York
- New York City Central Labor Council
- New York State Nurses Association
- NYC District Council of Carpenters
- Professional Staff Congress
- SEIU 32BJ
- United Federation of Teachers

Organizations

- Abundant New York
- Indivisible Brooklyn
- Make the Road Action
- New York League of Conservation Voters
- Planned Parenthood of Greater New York Action Fund
- Sunrise Movement NYC
- Working Families Party

==== Results ====
Democratic primary results
| Party | Candidate | Votes | % |
|---|---|---|---|
| Democratic | Lincoln Restler (incumbent) | 23,938 | 75.3 |
| Democratic | Sabrina Gates | 7,685 | 24.2 |
| Write-in | | 161 | 0.5 |
| Total votes | | 31,784 | 100.0 |

=== General election ===
==== Results ====
2025 New York City's 33rd City Council district election
| Party | Candidate | Votes | % |
|---|---|---|---|
| Democratic | Lincoln Restler | 35,329 | 75.75% |
| Working Families | Lincoln Restler | 10,583 | 22.69% |
| Total | Lincoln Restler (incumbent) | 45,912 | 98.45% |
| Write-in | | 724 | 1.55% |
| Total votes | | 46,636 | 100.0% |
| Democratic hold | | | |

== District 34 ==
2025 New York City Council 34th district election
- November 4, 2025
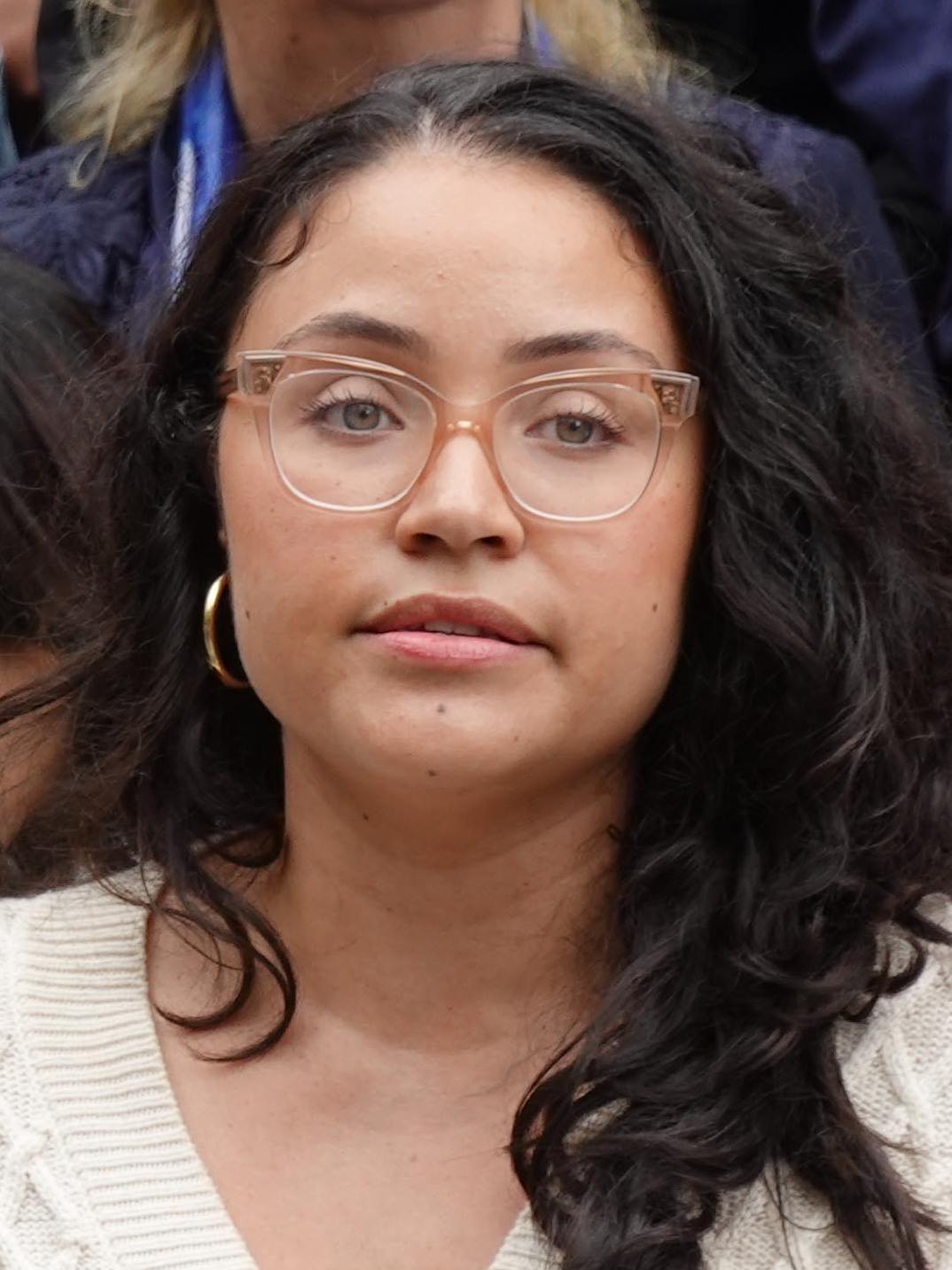
| | Majority party |
|---|---|
| Candidate | Jennifer Gutiérrez |
| Party | Democratic |
| Alliance | Working Families |
| Popular vote | 41,958 |
| Percentage | 99.5% |
Councilmember before election
Jennifer Gutiérrez
Democratic
Elected Councilmember
Jennifer Gutiérrez
Democratic

=== Democratic primary ===
==== Declared ====
- Jennifer Gutiérrez, incumbent Councilmember

==== Endorsements ====
Jennifer Gutiérrez

Individuals

- Ana Maria Archila, activist and co-director of the New York Working Families Party

Labor unions

- 1199SEIU United Healthcare Workers East
- Communications Workers of America District 1
- Council of School Supervisors & Administrators
- District Council 37
- Hotel Trades Council
- International Union of Painters and Allied Trades District Council 9
- LiUNA! New York
- New York State Nurses Association
- NYC District Council of Carpenters
- Professional Staff Congress
- SEIU 32BJ
- United Federation of Teachers

Organizations

- Make the Road Action
- Planned Parenthood of Greater New York Action Fund
- Sunrise Movement NYC
- Working Families Party

=== Republican primary ===
==== Disqualified ====
- Andrew Okuneff, landlord

=== General election ===
==== Results ====
2025 New York City's 34th City Council district election
| Party | Candidate | Votes | % |
|---|---|---|---|
| Democratic | Jennifer Gutiérrez | 30,345 | 71.93% |
| Working Families | Jennifer Gutiérrez | 11,613 | 27.53% |
| Total | Jennifer Gutiérrez (incumbent) | 41,958 | 99.46% |
| Write-in | | 228 | 0.54% |
| Total votes | | 42,186 | 100.0% |
| Democratic hold | | | |

== District 35 ==
2025 New York City Council 35th district election
- November 4, 2025
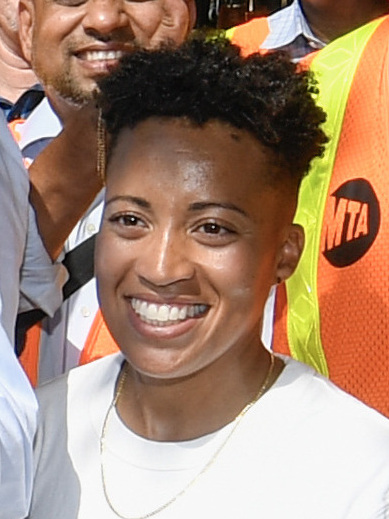

| | Majority party | Minority party |
|---|---|---|
| Candidate | Crystal Hudson | Benny Rosenberger |
| Party | Democratic | Conservative |
| Alliance | Working Families |
| Popular vote | 53,011 | 3,056 |
| Percentage | 92.8% | 5.3% |
Councilmember before election
Crystal Hudson
Democratic
Elected Councilmember
Crystal Hudson
Democratic

=== Democratic primary ===
==== Declared ====
- Dion Ashman, businessman and DJ
- Crystal Hudson, incumbent Councilmember
- Kenny Lever
- Hector Robertson, housing advocate and candidate for this district in 2021

==== Withdrawn ====
- Sharon Wedderburn, member of Brooklyn Community Board 8

==== Endorsements ====
Crystal Hudson

Statewide officials

- Letitia James, Attorney General of New York (2019–present)

State legislators

- Kenny Burgos, former State Assemblymember from the 85th district (2020–2024)

Local officials

- Rafael Espinal, former New York City Councilmember from the 37th district (2014–2020)
- Brad Lander, New York City Comptroller (2022–present)
- Jumaane Williams, New York City Public Advocate (2019–present)

Individuals

- Ana Maria Archila, activist and co-director of the New York Working Families Party

Labor unions

- 1199SEIU United Healthcare Workers East
- Communications Workers of America District 1
- Council of School Supervisors & Administrators
- District Council 37
- Hotel Trades Council
- LiUNA! New York
- New York City Central Labor Council
- New York State Nurses Association
- NYC District Council of Carpenters
- Professional Staff Congress
- SEIU 32BJ
- United Auto Workers Region 9A
- United Federation of Teachers

Organizations

- Abundant New York
- Brooklyn Young Democrats
- Citizen Action of New York
- Freelancers Union
- Indivisible Brooklyn
- Jim Owles Liberal Democratic Club
- Lambda Independent Democrats of Brooklyn
- LGBTQ+ Victory Fund
- LPAC
- Make the Road Action
- New York City Council Progressive Caucus Alliance
- New York League of Conservation Voters
- Planned Parenthood of Greater New York Action Fund
- Stonewall Democratic Club of New York
- Working Families Party

==== Results ====
Democratic primary results
| Party | Candidate | Votes | % |
|---|---|---|---|
| Democratic | Crystal Hudson (incumbent) | 32,386 | 84.7 |
| Democratic | Dion Ashman | 3,052 | 8.0 |
| Democratic | Hector Robertson | 1,750 | 4.6 |
| Democratic | Kenny Lever | 847 | 2.2 |
| Write-in | | 213 | 0.6 |
| Total votes | | 38,248 | 100.0 |

=== General election ===
==== Results ====
2025 New York City's 35th City Council district election
| Party | Candidate | Votes | % |
|---|---|---|---|
| Democratic | Crystal Hudson | 38,324 | 67.06% |
| Working Families | Crystal Hudson | 14,687 | 25.70% |
| Total | Crystal Hudson (incumbent) | 53,011 | 92.75% |
| Conservative | Benny Rosenberger | 3,056 | 5.35% |
| United Alliance | Hector Robertson | 933 | 1.63% |
| Write-in | | 152 | 0.27% |
| Total votes | | 57,152 | 100.0% |
| Democratic hold | | | |

== District 36 ==
2025 New York City Council 36th district election
- November 4, 2025
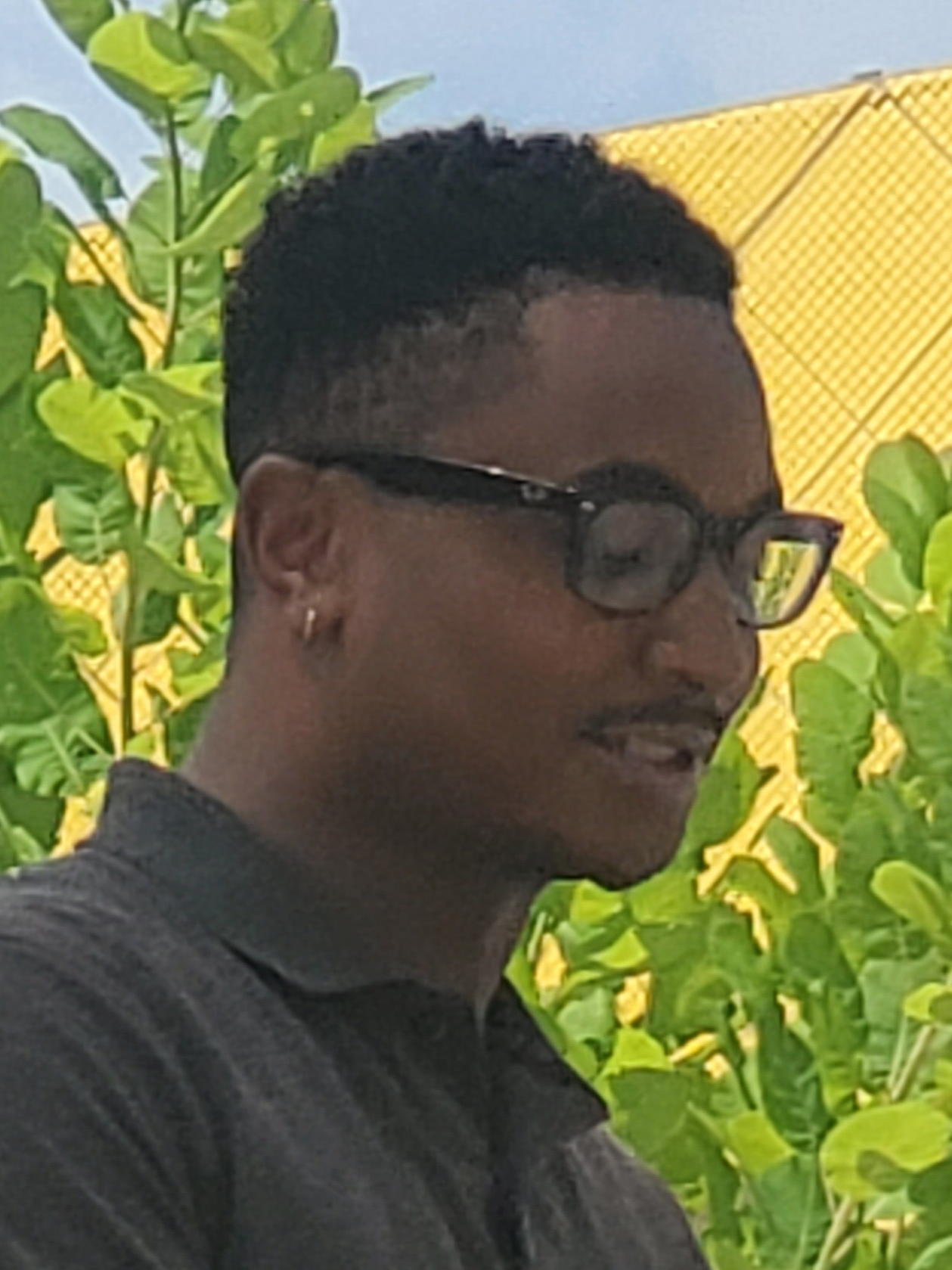
| | Majority party |
|---|---|
| Candidate | Chi Ossé |
| Party | Democratic |
| Popular vote | 40,588 |
| Percentage | 99.4% |
Councilmember before election
Chi Ossé
Democratic
Elected Councilmember
Chi Ossé
Democratic

=== Democratic primary ===
==== Declared ====
- Chi Ossé, incumbent Councilmember
- Reginald Swiney, activist and candidate for this district in 2021

==== Endorsements ====
Chi Ossé

U.S. representatives

- Alexandria Ocasio-Cortez, U.S. Representative from New York's 14th congressional district (2019–present)

Local officials

- Rafael Espinal, former New York City Councilmember from the 37th district (2014–2020)
- Brad Lander, New York City Comptroller (2022–present)

Individuals

- Ana Maria Archila, activist and co-director of the New York Working Families Party

Labor unions

- 1199SEIU United Healthcare Workers East
- Communications Workers of America District 1
- Council of School Supervisors & Administrators
- District Council 37
- Hotel Trades Council
- LiUNA! New York
- New York City Central Labor Council
- New York State Nurses Association
- NYC District Council of Carpenters
- Professional Staff Congress
- SEIU 32BJ
- United Federation of Teachers

Organizations

- Abundant New York
- Freelancers Union
- Lambda Independent Democrats of Brooklyn
- LGBTQ+ Victory Fund
- Make the Road Action
- Sunrise Movement NYC
- Working Families Party

==== Results ====
Democratic primary results
| Party | Candidate | Votes | % |
|---|---|---|---|
| Democratic | Chi Ossé (incumbent) | 21,950 | 78.5 |
| Democratic | Reginald Swiney | 5,796 | 20.7 |
| Write-in | | 206 | 0.7 |
| Total votes | | 27,952 | 100.0 |

=== General election ===
==== Results ====
2025 New York City's 36th City Council district election
| Party | Candidate | Votes | % |
|---|---|---|---|
| Democratic | Chi Ossé (incumbent) | 40,588 | 99.39% |
| Write-in | | 249 | 0.61% |
| Total votes | | 40,837 | 100.0% |
| Democratic hold | | | |

== District 37 ==
2025 New York City Council 37th district election
- November 4, 2025
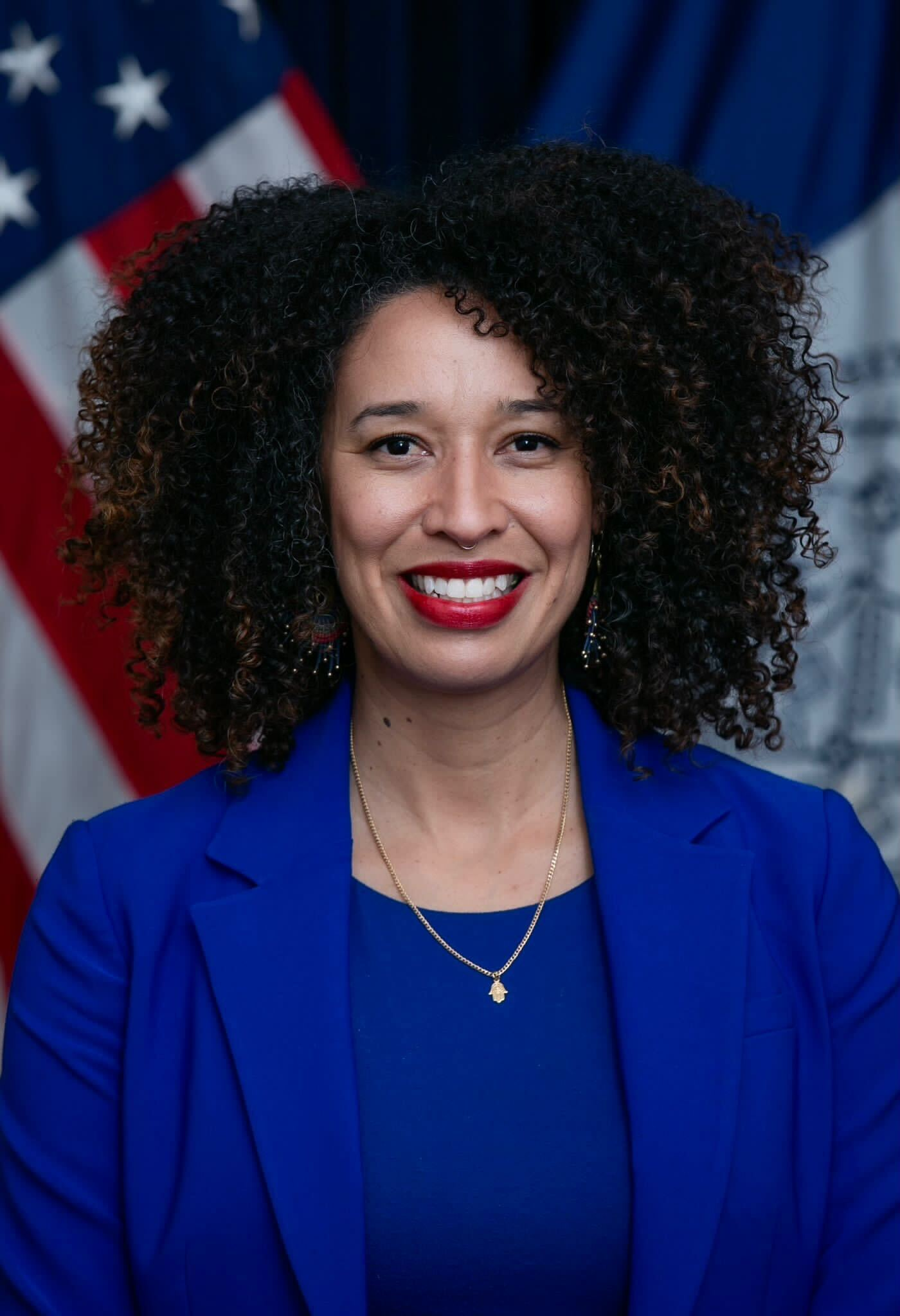
| | Majority party |
|---|---|
| Candidate | Sandy Nurse |
| Party | Democratic |
| Alliance | Working Families |
| Popular vote | 25,891 |
| Percentage | 99.5% |
Councilmember before election
Sandy Nurse
Democratic
Elected Councilmember
Sandy Nurse
Democratic

=== Democratic primary ===
==== Declared ====
- Sandy Nurse, incumbent Councilmember

==== Endorsements ====
Sandy Nurse

Individuals

- Ana Maria Archila, activist and co-director of the New York Working Families Party

Labor unions

- 1199SEIU United Healthcare Workers East
- Communications Workers of America District 1
- Council of School Supervisors & Administrators
- District Council 37
- Hotel Trades Council
- International Union of Painters and Allied Trades District Council 9
- LiUNA! New York
- New York City Central Labor Council
- New York State Nurses Association
- NYC District Council of Carpenters
- Professional Staff Congress
- SEIU 32BJ
- United Federation of Teachers

Organizations

- Jim Owles Liberal Democratic Club
- Make the Road Action
- New York League of Conservation Voters
- Sunrise Movement NYC
- Working Families Party

=== General election ===
==== Results ====
2025 New York City's 37th City Council district election
| Party | Candidate | Votes | % |
|---|---|---|---|
| Democratic | Sandy Nurse | 19,436 | 74.72% |
| Working Families | Sandy Nurse | 6,455 | 24.82% |
| Total | Sandy Nurse (incumbent) | 25,891 | 99.54% |
| Write-in | | 120 | 0.46% |
| Total votes | | 26,011 | 100.0% |
| Democratic hold | | | |

== District 38 ==
2025 New York City Council 38th district election
- November 4, 2025
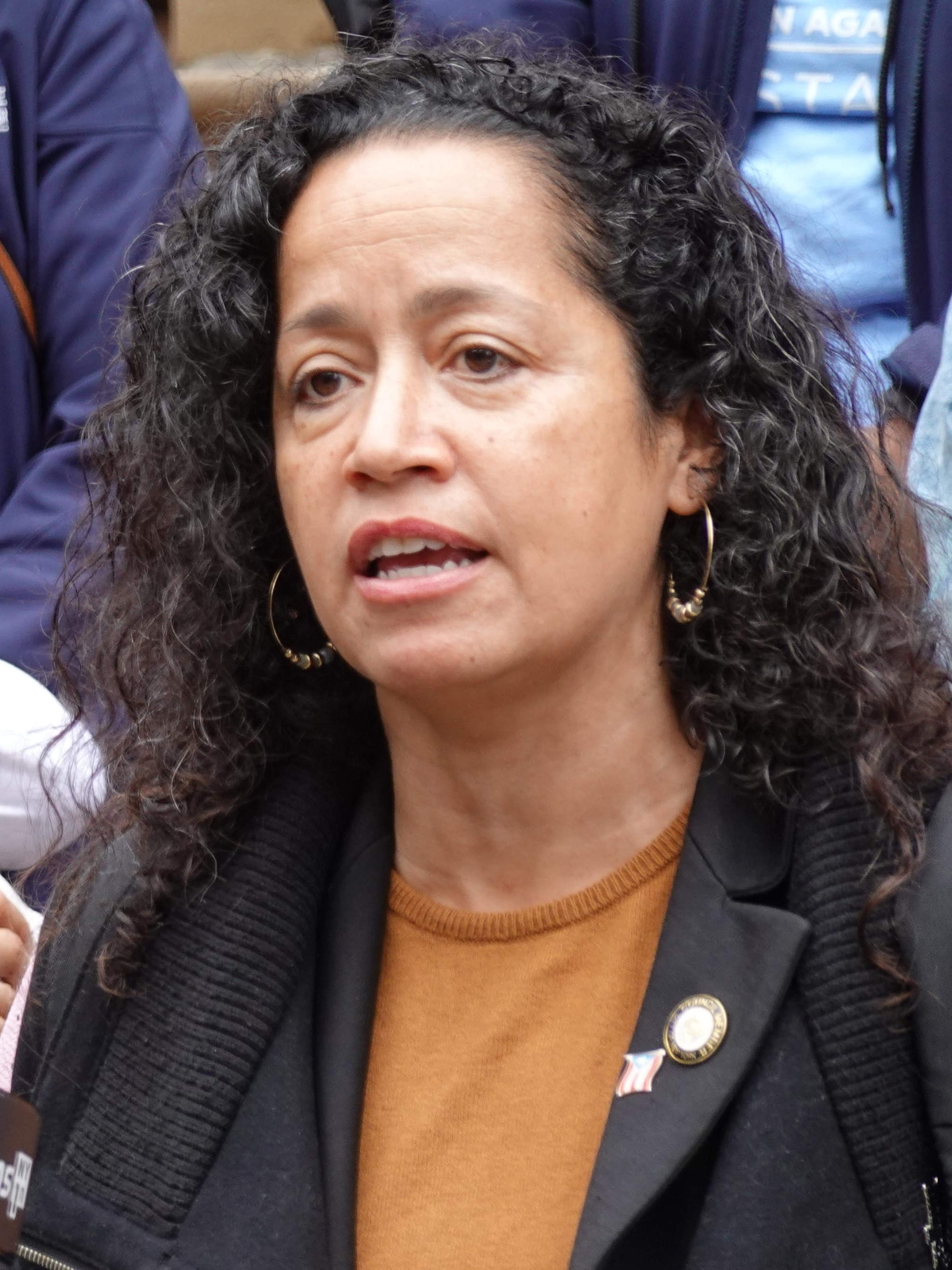

| | Majority party | Minority party |
|---|---|---|
| Candidate | Alexa Avilés | Luis Quero |
| Party | Democratic | Republican |
| Alliance | Working Families | Conservative |
| Popular vote | 19,751 | 7,259 |
| Percentage | 72.9% | 26.8% |
Councilmember before election
Alexa Avilés
Democratic
Elected Councilmember
Alexa Avilés
Democratic

=== Democratic primary ===
==== Declared ====
- Alexa Avilés, incumbent Councilmember
- Ling Ye, senior casework manager & field representative for congressman Dan Goldman

==== Endorsements ====
Alexa Avilés

U.S. representatives

- Alexandria Ocasio-Cortez, U.S. Representative from New York's 14th congressional district (2019–present)
- Nydia Velázquez, U.S. representative from New York's 7th congressional district (1993–present)

Local officials

- Rafael Espinal, former New York City Councilmember from the 37th district (2014–2020)
- Brad Lander, New York City Comptroller (2022–present)

Individuals

- Ana Maria Archila, activist and co-director of the New York Working Families Party
- John Avlon, journalist and board chair of Citizens Union

Labor unions

- 1199SEIU United Healthcare Workers East
- Council of School Supervisors & Administrators
- ~~District Council 37~~
- International Union of Painters and Allied Trades District Council 9
- LiUNA! New York
- New York City Central Labor Council
- New York State Nurses Association
- NYC District Council of Carpenters
- Professional Staff Congress
- SEIU 32BJ
- United Auto Workers Region 9A
- United Federation of Teachers

Organizations

- Brooklyn Young Democrats
- Citizen Action of New York
- Citizens Union
- Emgage Action
- Freelancers Union
- Indivisible Brooklyn
- Jews for Racial and Economic Justice
- Jim Owles Liberal Democratic Club
- Lambda Independent Democrats of Brooklyn
- Make the Road Action
- New York City Council Progressive Caucus Alliance
- New York City Democratic Socialists of America
- New York League of Conservation Voters
- Planned Parenthood of Greater New York Action Fund
- Stonewall Democratic Club of New York
- Sunrise Movement NYC
- Working Families Party

Newspapers

- Red Hook Star-Revue
Ling Ye

Organizations

- Jobs for New York
Declined to endorse

Local officials

- Carlos Menchaca, former New York City Councilmember from the 38th district (2014–2021)

==== Results ====
Democratic primary results
| Party | Candidate | Votes | % |
|---|---|---|---|
| Democratic | Alexa Avilés (incumbent) | 9,771 | 71.5 |
| Democratic | Ling Ye | 3,815 | 27.9 |
| Write-in | | 75 | 0.6 |
| Total votes | | 13,661 | 100.0 |

=== Republican primary ===
==== Declared ====
- Luis Quero, banking program manager

=== General election ===
==== Results ====
2025 New York City's 38th City Council district election
| Party | Candidate | Votes | % |
|---|---|---|---|
| Democratic | Alexa Avilés | 14,739 | 54.37% |
| Working Families | Alexa Avilés | 5,012 | 18.49% |
| Total | Alexa Avilés (incumbent) | 19,751 | 72.86% |
| Republican | Luis Quero | 6,458 | 23.82% |
| Conservative | Luis Quero | 801 | 2.95% |
| Total | Luis Quero | 7,259 | 26.78% |
| Write-in | | 97 | 0.36% |
| Total votes | | 27,107 | 100.0% |
| Democratic hold | | | |

== District 39 ==
2025 New York City Council 39th district election
- November 4, 2025
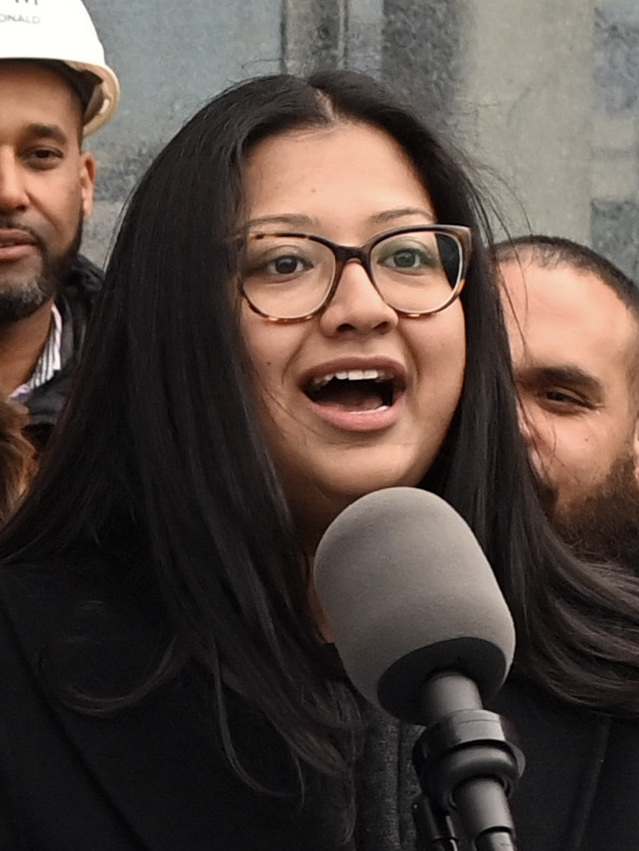

| | Majority party | Minority party |
|---|---|---|
| Candidate | Shahana Hanif | Brett Wynkoop |
| Party | Democratic | Conservative |
| Alliance | Working Families |
| Popular vote | 53,139 | 5,436 |
| Percentage | 85.8% | 8.8% |
Councilmember before election
Shahana Hanif
Democratic
Elected Councilmember
Shahana Hanif
Democratic

=== Democratic primary ===
Incumbent councilwoman Shahana Hanif had built a reputation as one of the most left-wing members of the council since first being elected in 2021, becoming chair of the New York City Council Progressive Caucus and being outspokenly pro-Palestine. She faced a primary challenge from self-described "pragmatic progressive" Maya Kornberg, who campaigned against Hanif's support for Palestine and accused her of not doing enough to combat antisemitism. Kornberg's campaign was also boosted by NIMBY groups, who were dissatisfied with Hanif's support for land rezoning decisions that allowed for the construction of high-rise apartments. Hanif and her allies accused Kornberg of being beholden to corporate interests, citing $129,000 Kornberg received in support from the Uber Super PAC and a website Uber created to support Kornberg's campaign.

==== Declared ====
- Shahana Hanif, incumbent
- Nickie Kane, activist, write-in candidate for Mayor of New York City in 2021, and candidate for this district in 2023
- Maya Kornberg, researcher at the Brennan Center for Justice

==== Endorsements ====
Shahana Hanif

U.S. representatives

- Yvette Clarke, U.S. representative from New York's 9th congressional district (2007–present)
- Alexandria Ocasio-Cortez, U.S. Representative from New York's 14th congressional district (2019–present)

State legislators

- Zohran Mamdani, State Assemblymember from the 36th district (2021–present)

Local officials

- Brad Lander, New York City Comptroller (2022–present)
- Antonio Reynoso, Brooklyn Borough President (2022–present)
- Jumaane Williams, New York City Public Advocate (2019–present)

Individuals

- Ana Maria Archila, activist and co-director of the New York Working Families Party

Labor unions

- 1199SEIU United Healthcare Workers East
- LiUNA! New York
- New York City Central Labor Council
- New York State Nurses Association
- NYC District Council of Carpenters
- Professional Staff Congress
- United Auto Workers Region 9A

Organizations

- Abundant New York
- Brooklyn Young Democrats
- Citizen Action of New York
- Emgage Action
- Jews for Racial and Economic Justice
- Jewish Voice for Peace
- Indivisible Brooklyn
- Make the Road Action
- New York City Council Progressive Caucus Alliance
- New York League of Conservation Voters
- Planned Parenthood of Greater New York Action Fund
- Project for Public Spaces
- Stonewall Democratic Club of New York
- Sunrise Movement NYC
- Working Families Party

Newspapers

- Red Hook Star-Revue
Maya Kornberg

U.S. representatives

- Max Rose, former U.S. representative from New York's 11th congressional district (2019–2021)

Local officials

- Marty Markowitz, former Brooklyn Borough President (2002–2013)
- David Yassky, former New York City Councilmember from the 33rd district (2002–2009)

Individuals

- John Avlon, journalist and board chair of Citizens Union
- James Dolan, businessman

Organizations

- Citizens Union
Declined to endorse

Local officials

- ~~Brad Lander, New York City Comptroller (2022–present)~~ (endorsed Hanif)

==== Results ====
Democratic primary results
| Party | Candidate | Votes | % |
|---|---|---|---|
| Democratic | Shahana Hanif (incumbent) | 30,592 | 69.8 |
| Democratic | Maya Kornberg | 11,467 | 26.2 |
| Democratic | Nickie Kane | 1,545 | 3.5 |
| Write-in | | 231 | 0.5 |
| Total votes | | 43,835 | 100.0 |

=== General election ===
==== Results ====
2025 New York City's 39th City Council district election
| Party | Candidate | Votes | % |
|---|---|---|---|
| Democratic | Shahana Hanif | 37,354 | 60.31% |
| Working Families | Shahana Hanif | 15,785 | 25.49% |
| Total | Shahana Hanif (incumbent) | 53,139 | 85.80% |
| Conservative | Brett Wynkoop | 5,436 | 8.78% |
| Libertarian | Matthew Morgan | 1,724 | 2.78% |
| Voters First | Nickie Kane | 1,225 | 1.98% |
| Write-in | | 408 | 0.66% |
| Total votes | | 61,932 | 100.0% |
| Democratic hold | | | |

== District 40 ==
2025 New York City Council 40th district election
- November 4, 2025
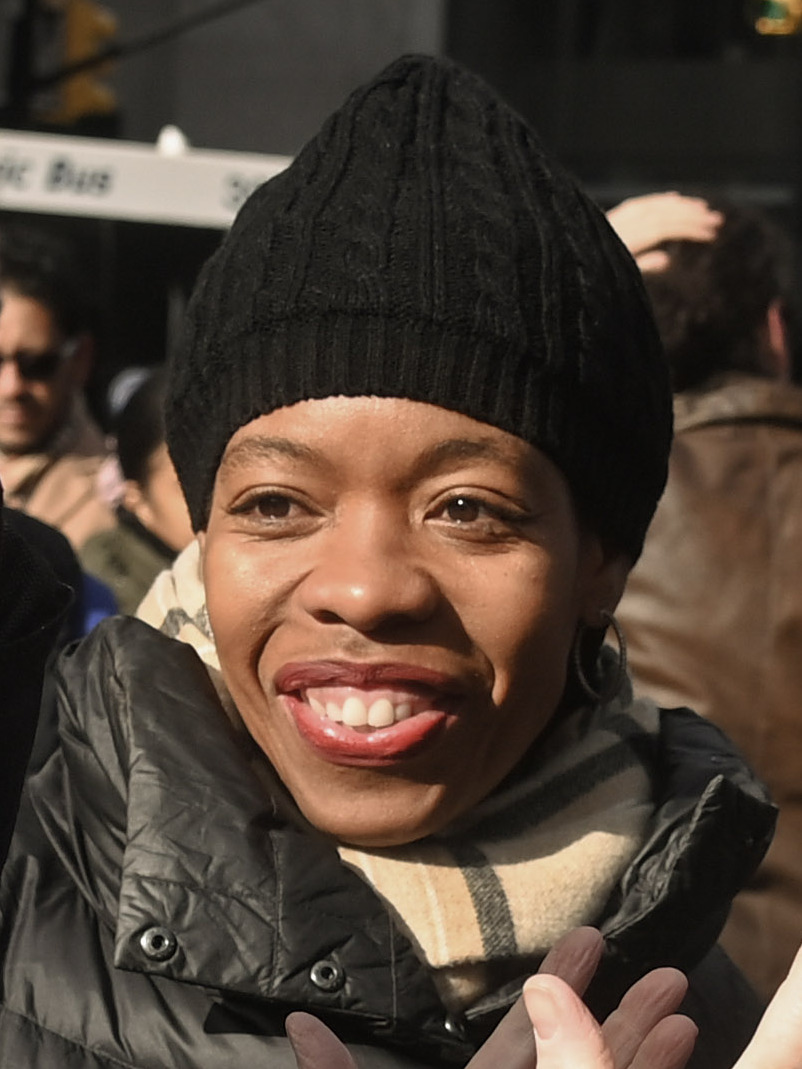
| | Majority party |
|---|---|
| Candidate | Rita Joseph |
| Party | Democratic |
| Alliance | Working Families |
| Popular vote | 39,078 |
| Percentage | 99.3% |
Councilmember before election
Rita Joseph
Democratic
Elected Councilmember
Rita Joseph
Democratic

=== Democratic primary ===
==== Declared ====
- Rita Joseph, incumbent Councilmember

==== Endorsements ====
Rita Joseph

Individuals

- Ana Maria Archila, activist and co-director of the New York Working Families Party

Labor unions

- 1199SEIU United Healthcare Workers East
- Communications Workers of America District 1
- Council of School Supervisors & Administrators
- District Council 37
- Hotel Trades Council
- LiUNA! New York
- New York State Nurses Association
- NYC District Council of Carpenters
- Professional Staff Congress
- SEIU 32BJ
- United Auto Workers Region 9A
- United Federation of Teachers

Organizations

- Make the Road Action
- New York League of Conservation Voters
- Working Families Party

=== General election ===
==== Results ====
2025 New York City's 40th City Council district election
| Party | Candidate | Votes | % |
|---|---|---|---|
| Democratic | Rita Joseph | 29,320 | 74.47% |
| Working Families | Rita Joseph | 9,758 | 24.79% |
| Total | Rita Joseph (incumbent) | 39,078 | 99.26% |
| Write-in | | 291 | 0.74% |
| Total votes | | 39,369 | 100.0% |
| Democratic hold | | | |

== District 41 ==
2025 New York City Council 41st district election
- November 4, 2025

| | Majority party | Minority party |
|---|---|---|
| Candidate | Darlene Mealy | Yehuda Shaffer |
| Party | Democratic | United Alliance |
| Popular vote | 24,229 | 1,615 |
| Percentage | 93.1% | 6.2% |
Councilmember before election
Darlene Mealy
Democratic
Elected Councilmember
Darlene Mealy
Democratic

=== Democratic primary ===
==== Declared ====
- Dante Arnwine, District Manager of Brooklyn Community Board 9
- Eli Brown
- Bianca Cunningham, campaigns director for Action Center on Race and the Economy
- Jamell Henderson, former chairman of Brooklyn Neighborhood Advisory Board 8
- Clifton Hinton
- Lawman Lynch, businessman
- Darlene Mealy, incumbent Councilmember
- Jammel Thompson, founder of Rich & Royal Clothing

==== Endorsements ====
Dante Arnwine

Organizations

- Jews for Racial and Economic Justice (third choice)
- Stonewall Democratic Club of New York
Bianca Cunningham

State legislators

- Jabari Brisport, state senator from the 25th district (2021–present) (co-endorsement with Henderson)

Labor unions

- Communications Workers of America District 1
- United Auto Workers Region 9A

Organizations

- Jews for Racial and Economic Justice (first choice)
- Sunrise Movement NYC
Jamell Henderson

State legislators

- Jabari Brisport, state senator from the 25th district (2021–present) (co-endorsement with Cunningham)

Local officials

- Antonio Reynoso, Brooklyn Borough President (2022–present)

Individuals

- Ana Maria Archila, activist and co-director of the New York Working Families Party

Organizations

- Citizen Action of New York
- Jews for Racial and Economic Justice (second choice)
- Working Families Party
Darlene Mealy

Individuals

- James Dolan, businessman

Labor unions

- Council of School Supervisors & Administrators
- International Union of Painters and Allied Trades District Council 9
- LiUNA! New York
- NYC District Council of Carpenters
- United Federation of Teachers
Declined to endorse

Labor unions

- New York City Central Labor Council

==== Results ====
2025 New York City Council District 41 Democratic primary results (unofficial)
| Party | Candidate | Maximum round | Maximum votes | Share in maximum round | Maximum votes First round votes Transfer votes |
|---|---|---|---|---|---|
| Democratic | Darlene Mealy (incumbent) | 8 | 8,031 | 65.4% | |
| Democratic | Lawman Lynch | 8 | 4,254 | 34.6% | |
| Democratic | Jammel Thompson | 7 | 2,803 | 20.4% | |
| Democratic | Bianca Cunningham | 6 | 2,369 | 16.1% | |
| Democratic | Jammel Henderson | 5 | 1,014 | 6.6% | |
| Democratic | Dante Arnwine | 4 | 668 | 4.4% | |
| Democratic | Eli Brown | 3 | 607 | 3.9% | |
| Democratic | Clifton A. Hinton | 2 | 170 | 1.1% | |
| Write-in | | 1 | 65 | 0.4% | |

=== General election ===
==== Results ====
2025 New York City's 41st City Council district election
| Party | Candidate | Votes | % |
|---|---|---|---|
| Democratic | Darlene Mealy (incumbent) | 24,229 | 93.08% |
| United Alliance | Yehuda Shaffer | 1,615 | 6.20% |
| Write-in | | 185 | 0.71% |
| Total votes | | 26,029 | 100.0% |
| Democratic hold | | | |

== District 42 ==
2025 New York City Council 42nd district election
- November 4, 2025

| | Majority party | Minority party |
|---|---|---|
| Candidate | Chris Banks | Davon Phillips |
| Party | Democratic | Freedom |
| Popular vote | 22,277 | 975 |
| Percentage | 95.6% | 4.2% |
Councilmember before election
Chris Banks
Democratic
Elected Councilmember
Chris Banks
Democratic

=== Democratic primary ===
==== Declared ====
- Chris Banks, incumbent Councilmember

==== Endorsements ====
Chris Banks

Labor unions

- 1199SEIU United Healthcare Workers East
- Communications Workers of America District 1
- Council of School Supervisors & Administrators
- District Council 37
- Hotel Trades Council
- International Union of Painters and Allied Trades District Council 9
- LiUNA! New York
- New York State Nurses Association
- NYC District Council of Carpenters
- SEIU 32BJ
- United Federation of Teachers

Organizations

- New York League of Conservation Voters

=== General election ===
==== Results ====
2025 New York City's 42nd City Council district election
| Party | Candidate | Votes | % |
|---|---|---|---|
| Democratic | Chris Banks (incumbent) | 22,277 | 95.61% |
| Freedom | Davon Phillips | 975 | 4.18% |
| Write-in | | 49 | 0.21% |
| Total votes | | 23,301 | 100.0% |
| Democratic hold | | | |

== District 43 ==
2025 New York City Council 43rd district election
- November 4, 2025
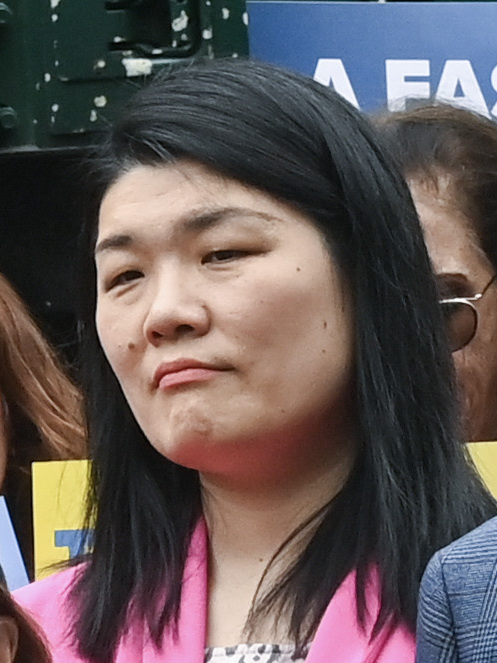
| | Majority party |
|---|---|
| Candidate | Susan Zhuang |
| Party | Democratic |
| Alliance | Conservative |
| Popular vote | 15,181 |
| Percentage | 98.6% |
Councilmember before election
Susan Zhuang
Democratic
Elected Councilmember
Susan Zhuang
Democratic

=== Democratic primary ===
==== Declared ====
- Susan Zhuang, incumbent Councilmember

==== Endorsements ====
Susan Zhuang

Labor unions

- Communications Workers of America District 1
- Council of School Supervisors & Administrators
- District Council 37
- Hotel Trades Council
- LiUNA! New York
- New York City Central Labor Council
- New York State Nurses Association
- NYC District Council of Carpenters
- SEIU 32BJ
- United Federation of Teachers

Organizations

- Brooklyn Conservative Party
- New York League of Conservation Voters

=== General election ===
==== Results ====
2025 New York City's 43rd City Council district election
| Party | Candidate | Votes | % |
|---|---|---|---|
| Democratic | Susan Zhuang | 11,690 | 75.93% |
| Conservative | Susan Zhuang | 3,491 | 22.68% |
| Total | Susan Zhuang (incumbent) | 15,181 | 98.61% |
| Write-in | | 214 | 1.39% |
| Total votes | | 15,395 | 100.0% |
| Democratic hold | | | |

== District 44 ==
2025 New York City Council 44th district election
- November 4, 2025
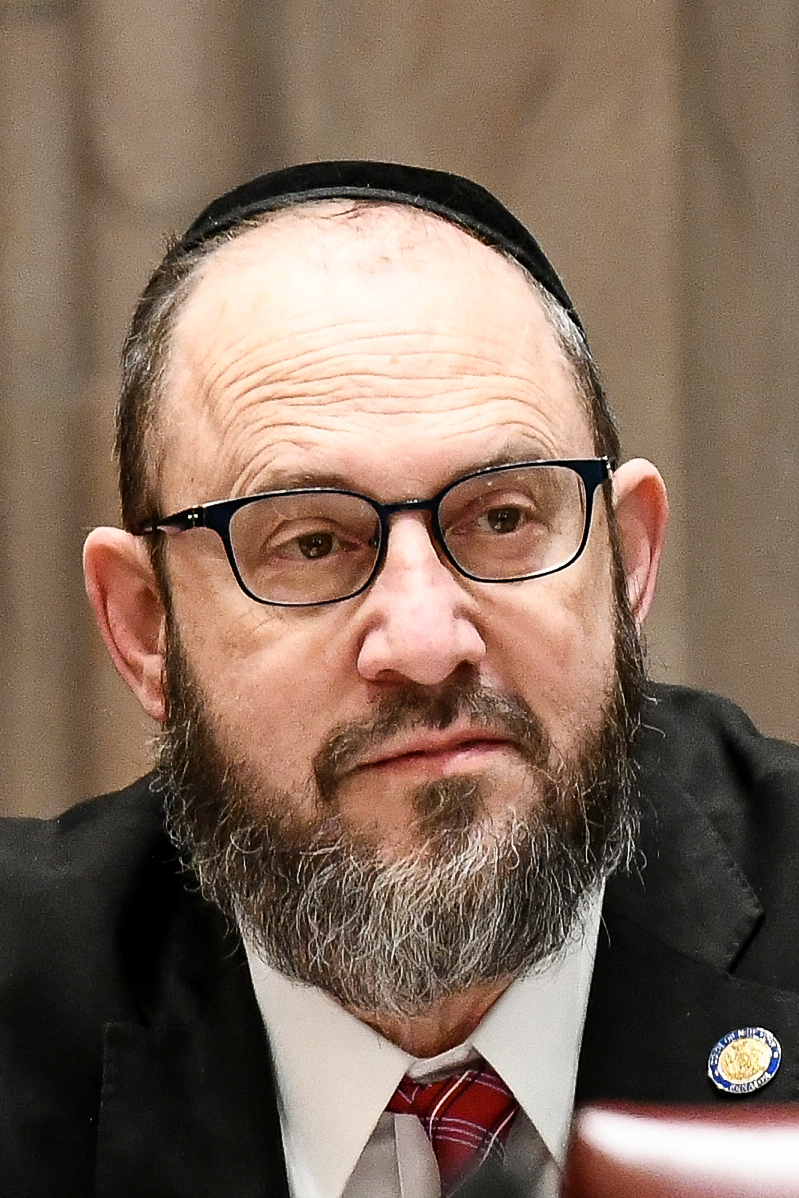

| | Majority party | Minority party |
|---|---|---|
| Candidate | Simcha Felder | Heshy Tischler |
| Party | Democratic | Republican |
| Alliance | Conservative | Trump MAGA |
| Popular vote | 34,452 | 6,299 |
| Percentage | 84.3% | 15.4% |
Councilmember before election
Simcha Felder
Democratic
Elected Councilmember
Simcha Felder
Democratic

=== Democratic primary ===
==== Declared ====
- Simcha Felder, incumbent Councilmember

==== Withdrawn ====
- Zahava Durchin

=== Republican primary ===
==== Declared ====
- Heshy Tischler, activist and perennial candidate

=== General election ===
==== Results ====
2025 New York City's 44th City Council district election
| Party | Candidate | Votes | % |
|---|---|---|---|
| Democratic | Simcha Felder (Note: Shared with "Law & Order" ballot line.) | 23,249 | 56.85% |
| Conservative | Simcha Felder | 11,203 | 27.39% |
| Total | Simcha Felder (incumbent) | 34,452 | 84.25% |
| Republican | Heshy Tischler | 5,760 | 14.08% |
| Trump MAGA | Heshy Tischler | 539 | 1.32% |
| Total | Heshy Tischler | 6,299 | 15.40% |
| Write-in | | 144 | 0.35% |
| Total votes | | 40,895 | 100.0% |
| Democratic hold | | | |

== District 45 ==
2025 New York City Council 45th district election
- November 4, 2025
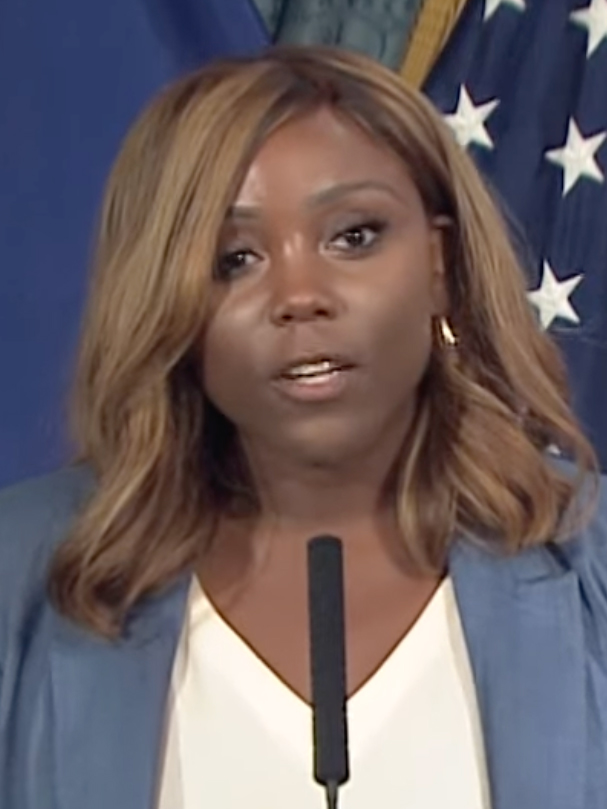

| | Majority party | Minority party |
|---|---|---|
| Candidate | Farah Louis | Elijah Diaz |
| Party | Democratic | Republican |
| Alliance | | Conservative |
| Popular vote | 31,611 | 4,248 |
| Percentage | 84.4% | 11.4% |
Councilmember before election
Farah Louis
Democratic
Elected Councilmember
Farah Louis
Democratic

=== Democratic primary ===
==== Declared ====
- Farah Louis, incumbent Councilmember

==== Endorsements ====
Farah Louis

Labor unions

- 1199SEIU United Healthcare Workers East
- Communications Workers of America District 1
- Council of School Supervisors & Administrators
- District Council 37
- Hotel Trades Council
- LiUNA! New York
- New York State Nurses Association
- Professional Staff Congress
- SEIU 32BJ
- United Federation of Teachers

Organizations

- New York League of Conservation Voters

=== Republican primary ===
==== Declared ====
- Elijah Diaz, businessman

=== Independents ===
==== Declared ====
- Hatem El-Gamasy, former bodega owner and foreign policy analyst

=== General election ===
==== Results ====
2025 New York City's 45th City Council district election
| Party | Candidate | Votes | % |
|---|---|---|---|
| Democratic | Farah Louis (incumbent) | 31,611 | 84.44% |
| Republican | Elijah Diaz | 3,497 | 9.34% |
| Conservative | Elijah Diaz | 751 | 2.01% |
| Total | Elijah Diaz | 4,248 | 11.35% |
| Safe&Affordable | Hatem El-Gamasy | 1,464 | 3.91% |
| Write-in | | 115 | 0.31% |
| Total votes | | 37,438 | 100.0% |
| Democratic hold | | | |

== District 46 ==
2025 New York City Council 46th district election
- November 4, 2025
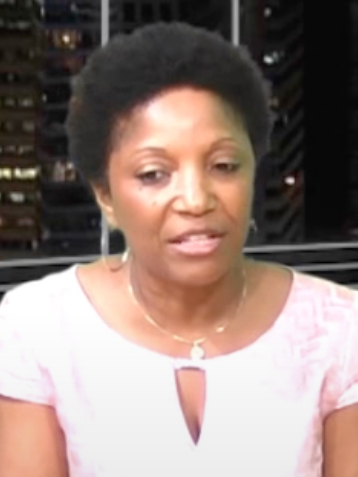

| | Majority party | Minority party |
|---|---|---|
| Candidate | Mercedes Narcisse | Athena Clarke |
| Party | Democratic | Republican |
| Popular vote | 24,622 | 10,012 |
| Percentage | 67.8% | 27.5% |
Councilmember before election
Mercedes Narcisse
Democratic
Elected Councilmember
Mercedes Narcisse
Democratic

=== Democratic primary ===
==== Declared ====
- Mercedes Narcisse, incumbent Councilmember
- Dimple Willabus, businesswoman and candidate for this district in 2021

==== Withdrawn ====
- Kenny Altidor, artist

==== Endorsements ====
Mercedes Narcisse

Local officials

- Brad Lander, New York City Comptroller (2022–present)

Labor unions

- 1199SEIU United Healthcare Workers East
- Council of School Supervisors & Administrators
- International Union of Painters and Allied Trades District Council 9
- LiUNA! New York
- New York City Central Labor Council
- New York State Nurses Association
- NYC District Council of Carpenters
- United Federation of Teachers

Organizations

- New York League of Conservation Voters

==== Results ====
Democratic primary results
| Party | Candidate | Votes | % |
|---|---|---|---|
| Democratic | Mercedes Narcisse (incumbent) | 12,768 | 82.9 |
| Democratic | Dimple Willabus | 2,576 | 16.7 |
| Write-in | | 50 | 0.3 |
| Total votes | | 15,394 | 100.0 |

=== Republican primary ===
==== Declared ====
- Athena Clarke, former teacher, worker's advocate, and medical freedom activist

=== General election ===
==== Results ====
2025 New York City's 46th City Council district election
| Party | Candidate | Votes | % |
|---|---|---|---|
| Democratic | Mercedes Narcisse (incumbent) | 24,622 | 67.76% |
| Republican | Athena Clarke | 10,012 | 27.55% |
| Conservative | Dimple Willabus | 1,643 | 4.52% |
| Write-in | | 62 | 0.17% |
| Total votes | | 36,339 | 100.0% |
| Democratic hold | | | |

== District 47 ==
2025 New York City Council 47th district election
- November 4, 2025
| | Majority party | Minority party |
|---|---|---|
| Candidate | Kayla Santosuosso | George Sarantopoulos |
| Party | Democratic | Republican |
| Alliance | Working Families | Conservative |
| Popular vote | 21,665 | 14,782 |
| Percentage | 59.3% | 40.5% |
Councilmember before election
Justin Brannan
Democratic
Elected Councilmember
Kayla Santosuosso
Democratic

=== Democratic primary ===
==== Declared ====
- Kayla Santosuosso, chief counsel for Justin Brannan
- Fedir Usmanov, operations manager

==== Withdrawn ====
- Anthony Batista, Vice-Chair of Brooklyn Neighborhood Advisory Board 15
- Linda Harrison, 2nd Vice Chair of the Brooklyn Community Board 13

==== Endorsements ====
Kayla Santosuosso

State legislators

- Andrew Gounardes, state senator from the 26th district (2019–present)

Local officials

- Justin Brannan, city councilmember from the 47th district (2018–present)

Individuals

- Ana Maria Archila, activist and co-director of the New York Working Families Party

Labor unions

- 1199SEIU United Healthcare Workers East
- Communications Workers of America District 1
- District Council 37
- Hotel Trades Council
- New York City Central Labor Council
- New York State Nurses Association
- NYC District Council of Carpenters
- Professional Staff Congress
- SEIU 32BJ
- United Auto Workers Region 9A
- United Federation of Teachers

Organizations

- Brooklyn Young Democrats
- Jews for Racial and Economic Justice

Political parties

- Working Families Party

==== Results ====
Democratic primary results
| Party | Candidate | Votes | % |
|---|---|---|---|
| Democratic | Kayla Santosuosso | 9,937 | 79.3 |
| Democratic | Fedir Usmanov | 2,512 | 20.0 |
| Write-in | | 87 | 0.7 |
| Total votes | | 12,536 | 100.0 |

=== Republican primary ===
==== Declared ====
- Richie Barsamian, chair of the Kings County Republican Party
- George Sarantopoulos, political consultant and former Director of Communications for Assemblyman Lester Chang

==== Endorsements ====
Richie Barsamian

U.S. representatives

- Nicole Malliotakis, NY-11 (2021–present)

Local officials

- ~~Inna Vernikov, city councilmember from the 48th district (2021–present)~~ (switched endorsement to Sarantopoulous)
- Ari Kagan, former city councilmember from the 47th district (2022–2024)

Individuals

- Curtis Sliwa, founder and CEO of the Guardian Angels

Organizations

- Kings County Republican Party
George Sarantopoulos

Local officials

- Inna Vernikov, city councilmember from the 48th district (2021–present)

Organizations

- New York Young Republican Club

==== Results ====
There were reports of potential electoral fraud in the Republican primary, which involved absentee ballots being cast on behalf of dead people and nonvoters. The New York City Board of Elections certified the election while excluding 22 "potentially fraudulent" ballots. A lawyer assisting Barsamian stated an elections official told him that most or all of these 22 votes were for Barsamian. Sarantopoulos ultimately won by 16 votes.

Republican primary results
| Party | Candidate | Maximum round | Maximum votes | Share in maximum round | Maximum votes First round votes Transfer votes |
|---|---|---|---|---|---|
| Republican | George Sarantopoulos | 2 | 1,126 | 50.4% | |
| Republican | Richie Barsamian | 2 | 1,110 | 49.6% | |
| Write-in | | 1 | 41 | 1.8% | |

=== General election ===
==== Endorsements ====
George Sarantopoulos (R)

2025 primary candidates

- Richie Barsamian, chair of the Brooklyn Republican Party

==== Results ====
2025 New York City's 47th City Council district election
| Party | Candidate | Votes | % |
|---|---|---|---|
| Democratic | Kayla Santosuosso | 18,343 | 50.22% |
| Working Families | Kayla Santosuosso | 3,322 | 9.09% |
| Total | Kayla Santosuosso | 21,665 | 59.31% |
| Republican | George Sarantopoulos | 13,380 | 36.63% |
| Conservative | George Sarantopoulos | 1,402 | 3.84% |
| Total | George Sarantopoulos | 14,782 | 40.47% |
| Write-in | | 80 | 0.22% |
| Total votes | | 36,527 | 100.0% |
| Democratic hold | | | |

== District 48 ==
2025 New York City Council 48th district election
- November 4, 2025
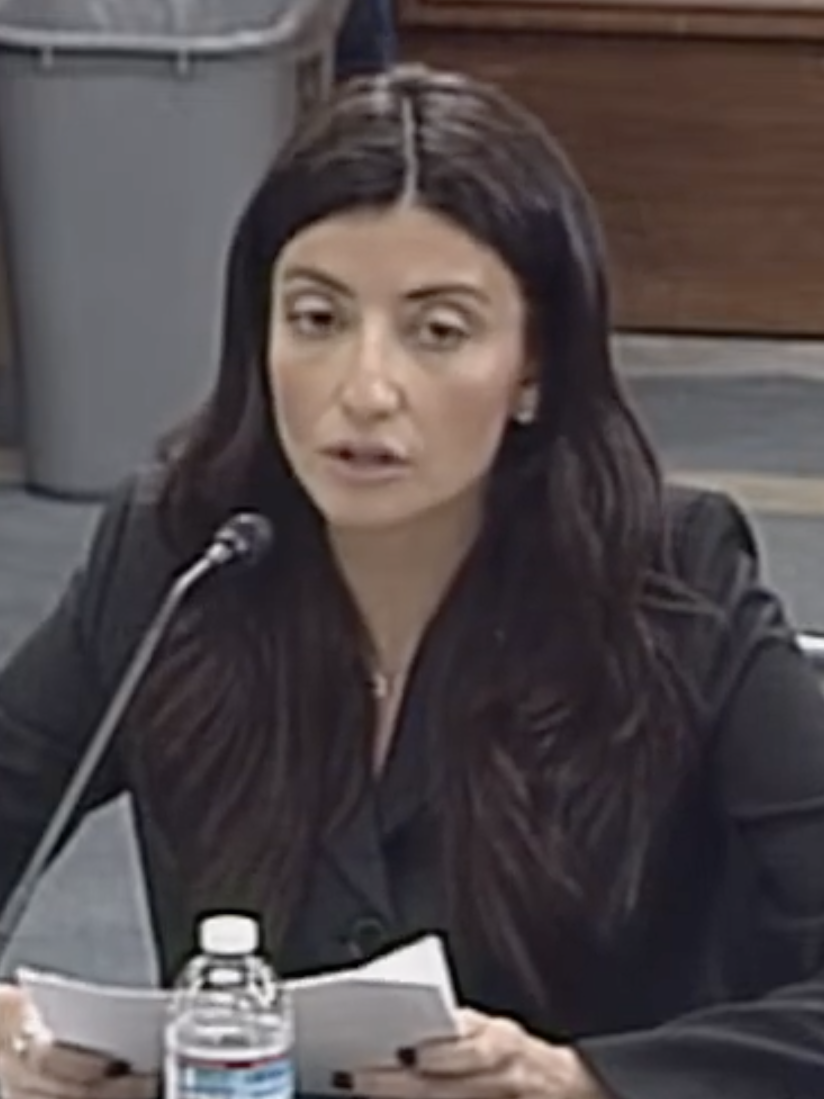
| | Majority party |
|---|---|
| Candidate | Inna Vernikov |
| Party | Republican |
| Alliance | Conservative |
| Popular vote | 28,739 |
| Percentage | 97.7% |
Councilmember before election
Inna Vernikov
Republican
Elected Councilmember
Inna Vernikov
Republican

=== Republican primary ===
==== Advanced to general ====
- Inna Vernikov, incumbent councilmember

==== Eliminated in primary ====
- Ari Kagan, former New York City Councilmember from the 47th district (2022–2024)

==== Endorsements ====
Ari Kagan

State legislators

- Alec Brook-Krasny, state assemblymember from the 46th district (2006–2015, 2023–present)
- Michael Novakhov, state assemblymember from the 45th district (2023–present)
Inna Vernikov

U.S. representatives

- Mike Lawler, U.S. Representative from New York's 17th congressional district (2023–present)
- Elise Stefanik, U.S. Representative from New York's 21st congressional district (2015–present)

Individuals

- Donald Trump Jr., businessman and son of President Donald Trump

Labor unions

- NYC District Council of Carpenters
- Police Benevolent Association of the City of New York

Organizations

- New York Young Republican Club

==== Results ====
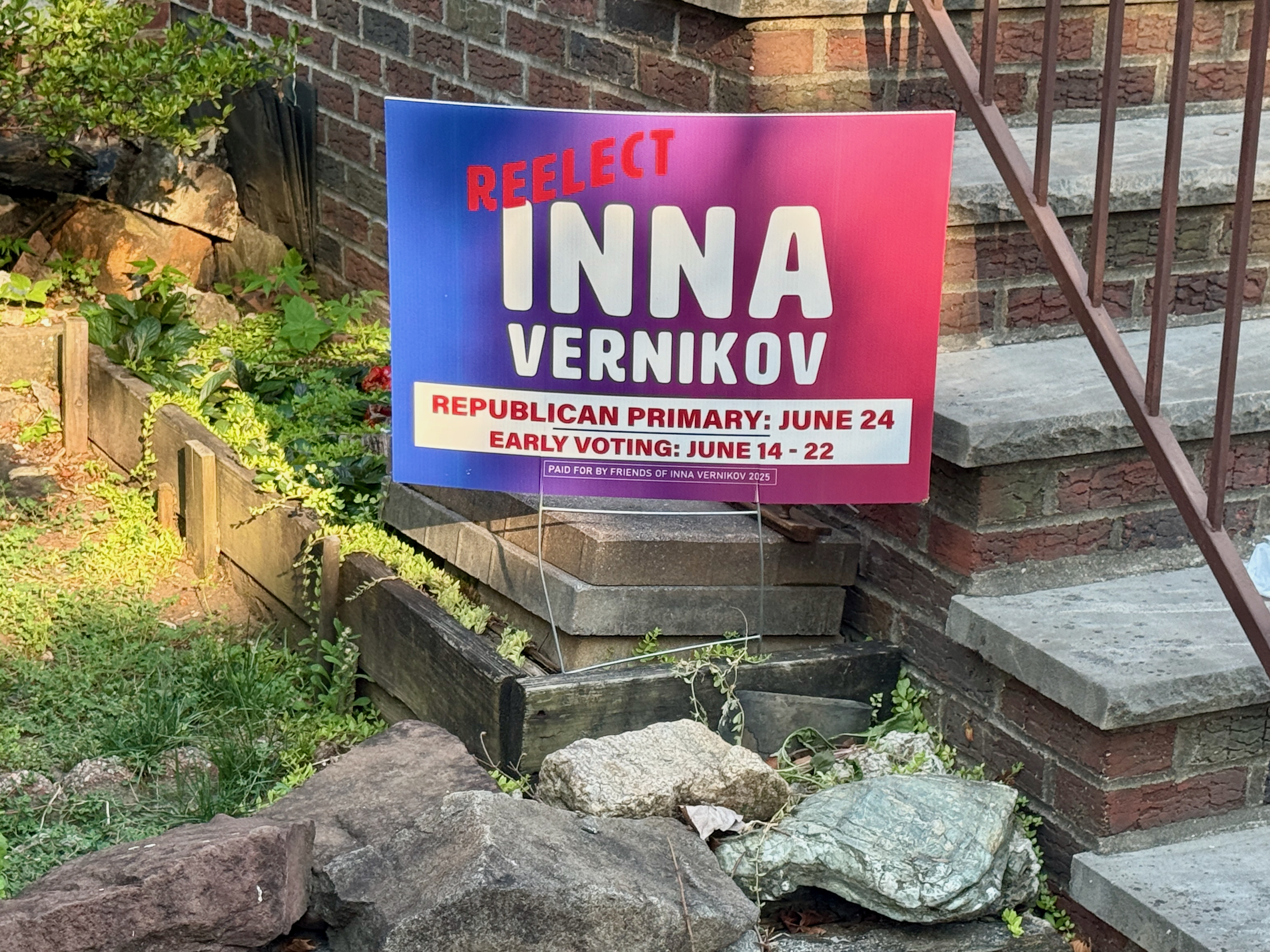
A lawn sign in support of Vernikov

Republican primary results
| Party | Candidate | Votes | % |
|---|---|---|---|
| Republican | Inna Vernikov (incumbent) | 2,604 | 65.7% |
| Republican | Ari Kagan | 1,338 | 33.7% |
| Write-in | | 23 | 0.6% |
| Total votes | | 3,965 | 100.0% |

=== Democratic primary ===
==== Withdrawn ====
- Anzhela Pinkhasov, consultancy group founder

=== General election ===
==== Results ====
2025 New York City's 48th City Council district election
| Party | Candidate | Votes | % |
|---|---|---|---|
| Republican | Inna Vernikov | 24,831 | 84.41% |
| Conservative | Inna Vernikov | 3,908 | 13.28% |
| Total | Inna Vernikov (incumbent) | 28,739 | 97.69% |
| Write-in | | 679 | 2.31% |
| Total votes | | 29,418 | 100.0% |
| Republican hold | | | |

== District 49 ==
2025 New York City Council 49th district election
- November 4, 2025
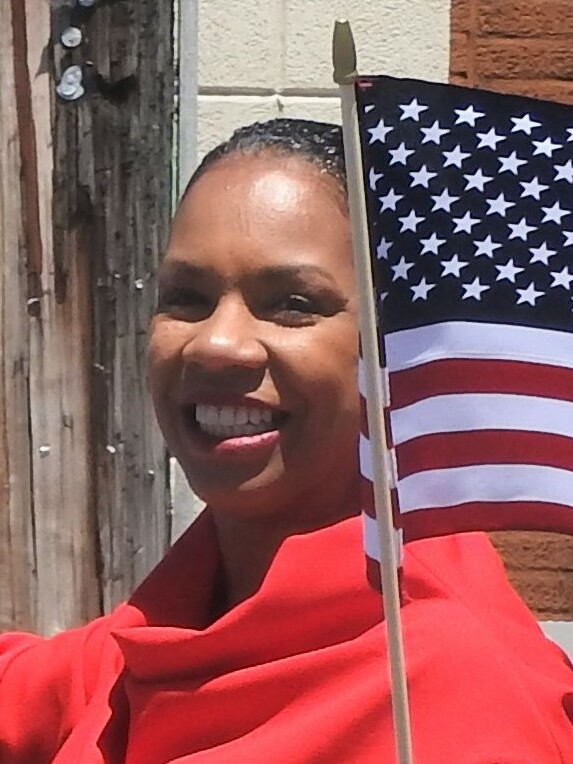

| | Majority party | Minority party | Third party |
|---|---|---|---|
| Candidate | Kamillah Hanks | John Shea | Sarah Blas |
| Party | Democratic | Republican | Working Families |
| Popular vote | 19,601 | 12,220 | 3,685 |
| Percentage | 55.1% | 34.3% | 10.4% |
Councilmember before election
Kamillah Hanks
Democratic
Elected Councilmember
Kamillah Hanks
Democratic

=== Democratic primary ===
==== Declared ====
- Sarah Blas, activist
- Telee Brown, member of the Mariner's Harbor/Port Richmond Area Committee of Staten Island Community Board 1
- Abou Sy Diakhate, District Leader AD-61, Court Analyst, Community Advocate and Organizer
- Kamillah Hanks, incumbent Councilmember

==== Disqualified ====
- Jozette Carter-Williams, banker (running as an independent)

==== Withdrawn ====
- Aidan Rivera, vice president of the Richmond County Young Democrats

==== Endorsements ====
Sarah Blas

Individuals

- Ana Maria Archila, activist and co-director of the New York Working Families Party

Organizations

- Jews for Racial and Economic Justice
- Jim Owles Liberal Democratic Club
- Run for Something
- Working Families Party
Jozette Carter-Williams (disqualified)

Labor unions

- Police Benevolent Association of the City of New York
Kamillah Hanks

Labor unions

- 1199SEIU United Healthcare Workers East
- Communications Workers of America District 1
- Council of School Supervisors & Administrators
- District Council 37
- Hotel Trades Council
- International Union of Painters and Allied Trades District Council 9
- LiUNA! New York
- New York City Central Labor Council
- New York State Nurses Association
- NYC District Council of Carpenters
- SEIU 32BJ
- United Federation of Teachers
Decline to endorse

Organizations

- Stonewall Democratic Club of New York

==== Results ====
Democratic primary results
| Party | Candidate | Votes | % |
|---|---|---|---|
| Democratic | Kamillah Hanks (incumbent) | 6,706 | 58.5 |
| Democratic | Abou Diakhate | 1,826 | 15.9 |
| Democratic | Sarah Blas | 1,734 | 15.1 |
| Democratic | Telee Brown | 1,026 | 8.9 |
| Write-in | | 179 | 1.6 |
| Total votes | | 11,471 | 100.0 |

=== Republican primary ===
==== Declared ====
- John Shea, retired police officer

==== Endorsements ====
John Shea

State legislators

- Michael Tannousis, State Assemblymember from the 64th district (2021–present) and Chair of the Staten Island Republican Party (2022–present)

Organizations

- Staten Island Republican Party

=== General election ===
==== Results ====
2025 New York City's 49th City Council district election
| Party | Candidate | Votes | % |
|---|---|---|---|
| Democratic | Kamillah Hanks (incumbent) | 19,601 | 55.07% |
| Republican | John Shea | 12,220 | 34.33% |
| Working Families | Sarah Blas | 3,172 | 8.91% |
| New North Shore | Sarah Blas | 513 | 1.44% |
| Total | Sarah Blas | 3,685 | 10.35% |
| Write-in | | 87 | 0.24% |
| Total votes | | 35,593 | 100.0% |
| Democratic hold | | | |

== District 50 ==
2025 New York City Council 50th district election
- November 4, 2025
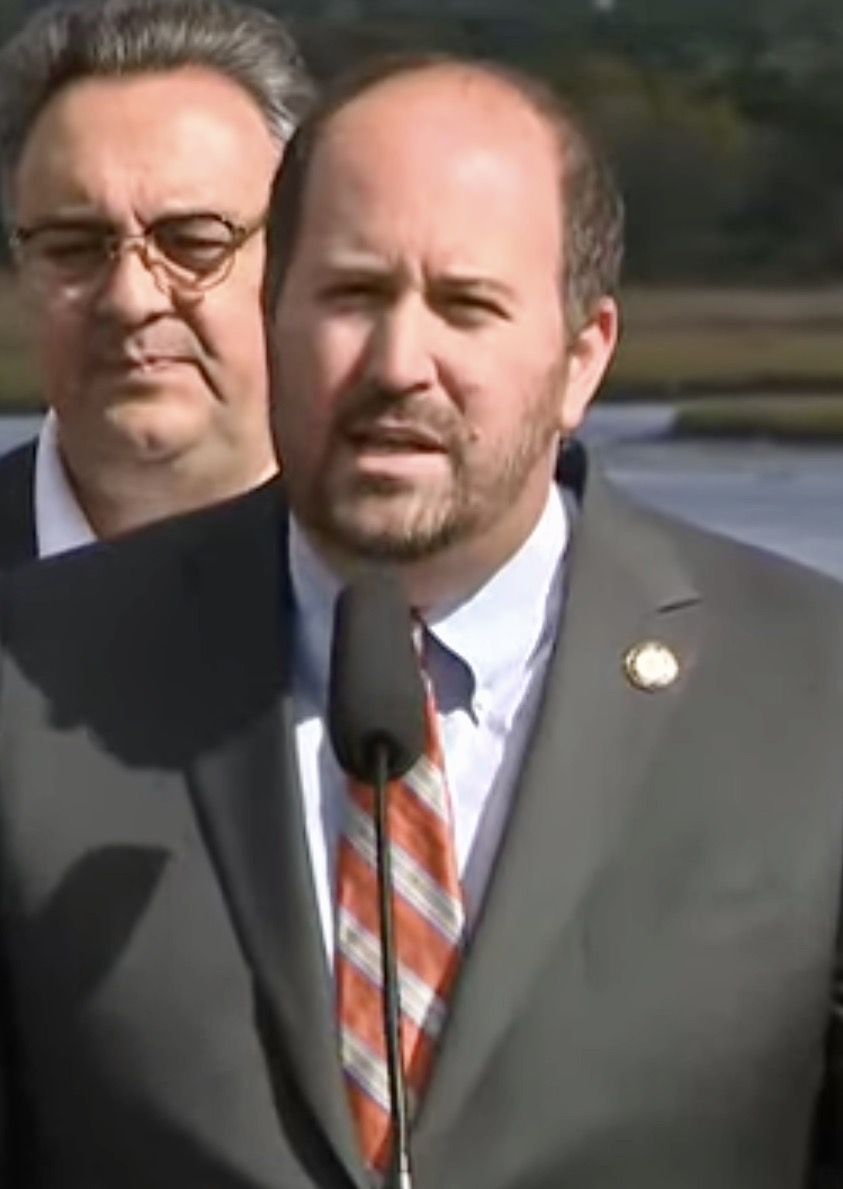

| | Majority party | Minority party |
|---|---|---|
| Candidate | David Carr | Radhakrishna Mohan |
| Party | Republican | Democratic |
| Alliance | Conservative |
| Popular vote | 36,741 | 13,560 |
| Percentage | 72.9% | 26.9% |
Councilmember before election
David Carr
Republican
Elected Councilmember
David Carr
Republican

=== Republican primary ===
==== Declared ====
- David Carr, incumbent Councilmember

==== Endorsements ====
David Carr

Labor unions

- Council of School Supervisors & Administrators
- NYC District Council of Carpenters

=== Democratic primary ===
==== Declared ====
- Radhakrishna Mohan, IT specialist and candidate for borough president in 2021

=== General election ===
==== Results ====
2025 New York City's 50th City Council district election
| Party | Candidate | Votes | % |
|---|---|---|---|
| Republican | David Carr | 33,990 | 67.46% |
| Conservative | David Carr | 2,751 | 5.46% |
| Total | David Carr (incumbent) | 36,741 | 72.92% |
| Democratic | Radhakrishna Mohan | 13,560 | 26.91% |
| Write-in | | 84 | 0.17% |
| Total votes | | 50,385 | 100.0% |
| Republican hold | | | |

== District 51 ==
2025 New York City Council 51st district election
- November 4, 2025
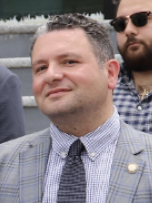

| | Majority party | Minority party |
|---|---|---|
| Candidate | Frank Morano | Clifford Hagen |
| Party | Republican | Democratic |
| Alliance | Conservative |
| Popular vote | 44,822 | 11,922 |
| Percentage | 77.5% | 20.6% |
Councilmember before election
Frank Morano
Republican
Elected Councilmember
Frank Morano
Republican

=== Republican primary ===
After his special election victory, newly-elected incumbent Frank Morano faced only token opposition in the regular election primary. His only active challenge was from retired police sergeant John Buthorn, who campaigned on expanding access to mental health services. Griffin Fossella, Morano's special election opponent, was on the ballot but did not actively campaign.

==== Declared ====
- John Buthorn, retired NYPD sergeant
- Frank Morano, incumbent Councilmember

==== Withdrawn ====
- Griffin Fossella, son of Staten Island Borough President Vito Fossella (remained on ballot)

==== Endorsements ====
Frank Morano

Individuals

- John Avlon, journalist and board chair of Citizens Union (Democratic)

Labor unions

- Council of School Supervisors & Administrators

Organizations

- Citizens Union

==== Results ====
Republican primary results
| Party | Candidate | Votes | % |
|---|---|---|---|
| Republican | Frank Morano (incumbent) | 3,310 | 82.0 |
| Republican | Griffin Fossella (withdrawn) | 376 | 9.3 |
| Republican | John Buthorn | 329 | 8.1 |
| Write-in | | 24 | 0.6 |
| Total votes | | 4,039 | 100.0 |

=== Democratic primary ===
==== Declared ====
- Clifford Hagen, special education teacher and environmentalist

=== General election ===
==== Results ====
2025 New York City's 51st City Council district election
| Party | Candidate | Votes | % |
|---|---|---|---|
| Republican | Frank Morano | 42,032 | 72.65% |
| Conservative | Frank Morano | 2,790 | 4.82% |
| Total | Frank Morano (incumbent) | 44,822 | 77.48% |
| Democratic | Clifford Hagen | 11,922 | 20.61% |
| Patriot Workers | John Buthorn | 1,010 | 1.75% |
| Write-in | | 98 | 0.17% |
| Total votes | | 57,852 | 100.0% |
| Republican hold | | | |

== 2026 Speaker election ==
Incumbent Speaker Adrienne Adams is term limited and can not run for re-election, paving the way for an open speakership election in 2026. Reported potential candidates for the position, which requires at least 26 votes to win, include:

- Amanda Farías (D-18th)
- Crystal Hudson (D-35th)
- Christopher Marte (D-1st)
- Julie Menin (D-5th)
- Selvena Brooks-Powers (D-31st)

Carmen De La Rosa (D-10th) withdrew from the race. On November 26, 2025, Menin announced she had the support of 36 councilmembers, constituting a supermajority.

== See also ==
- 2025 New York City mayoral election
- 2025 New York City Comptroller election
- 2025 New York City Public Advocate election
- 2025 New York City borough president elections
