= 2025 New York City borough president elections =

- November 4, 2025
	Majority party	Minority party
Party	Democratic	Republican
Seats before	4	1
Seats won	4	1
Seat change	Steady	Steady
- Results: Democratic hold Republican hold

Elections for New York City's borough presidents were held on November 4, 2025. All five incumbent borough presidents were eligible to run for reelection, however, Manhattan borough president Mark Levine opted not to seek reelection and instead successfully ran for New York City Comptroller in the 2025 New York City Comptroller election. The other four borough presidents were all reelected to their second consecutive four-year term.

== Overview ==
Borough	Incumbent president	Party	Elected president	Party
Brooklyn	Antonio Reynoso	Dem	Antonio Reynoso	Dem
Manhattan	Mark Levine	Dem	Brad Hoylman-Sigal	Dem
Queens	Donovan Richards	Dem	Donovan Richards	Dem
Staten Island	Vito Fossella	Rep	Vito Fossella	Rep
The Bronx	Vanessa Gibson	Dem	Vanessa Gibson	Dem

== Manhattan ==
2025 Manhattan Borough President election

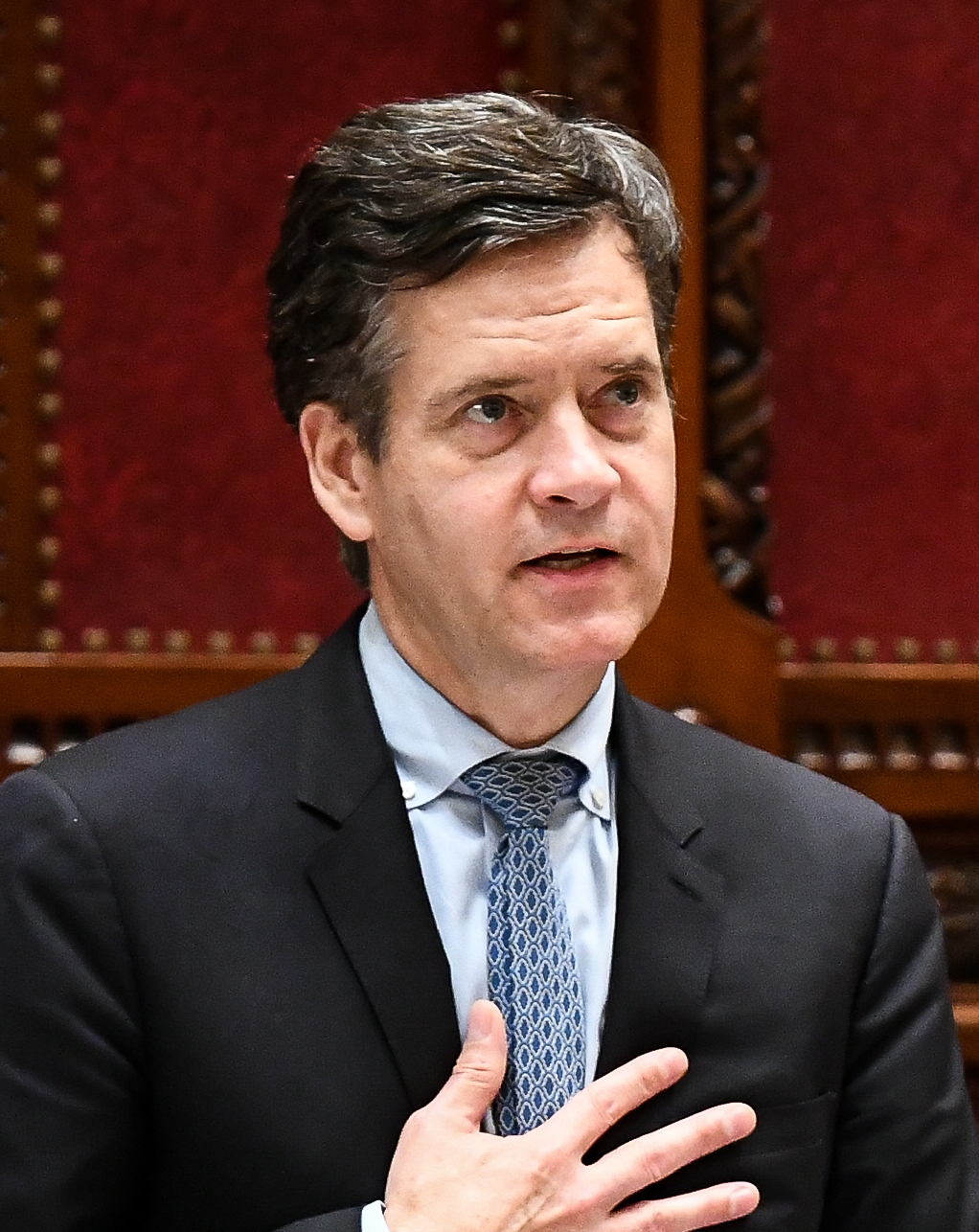

Nominee	Brad Hoylman-Sigal	Seson Adams
Party	Democratic	Republican
Alliance	Working Families
Popular vote	412,264	87,406
Percentage	80.80%	17.10%
- Precinct results Hoylman-Sigal: 50–60% 60–70% 70–80% 80–90% >90% Tie: 50% No votes
Borough President before election
Mark Levine
Democratic
Elected Borough President
Brad Hoylman-Sigal
Democratic

Incumbent Democrat Mark Levine was eligible to run for re-election to a second term but chose to run for Comptroller.

=== Democratic primary ===
==== Nominee ====
- Brad Hoylman-Sigal, state senator from the 47th district (2013–present) and candidate for borough president in 2021

==== Eliminated in primary ====
- Keith Powers, former Majority Leader of the New York City Council (2022–2024) from the 4th district (2018–present)
- Calvin Sun, physician (previously ran for Public Advocate)

==== Declined ====
- Gale Brewer, city councilmember from the 6th district (2002–2013, 2022–present) and former borough president (2014–2021) (endorsed Hoylman-Sigal)
- Grace Lee, state assemblymember from the 65th district (2023–present) (endorsed Hoylman-Sigal)
- Mark Levine, incumbent borough president (running for comptroller)
- Carlina Rivera, city councilmember from the 2nd district (2018–present) and candidate for New York's 10th congressional district in 2022

==== Endorsements ====
Brad Hoylman-Sigal

U.S. representatives

- Dan Goldman, U.S. representative from New York's 10th congressional district (2023–present)
- Jerry Nadler, U.S. representative from New York's 12th congressional district (1993–present)
- Charles Rangel, former U.S. representative from New York's 13th congressional district (1971–2017) (deceased)

Statewide officials

- Letitia James, Attorney General of New York (2019–present)
- David Paterson, former Governor of New York (2008–2010)

State legislators

- Cordell Cleare, state senator from the 30th district (2021–present)
- Inez Dickens, former state assemblymember from the 70th district (2017–2025)
- Eddie Gibbs, state assemblymember from the 68th district (2022–present)
- Richard Gottfried, former state assemblymember from the 75th district (1971–2022)
- Robert Jackson, state senator for the 31st district (2019–present)
- Brian Kavanagh, state senator for the 27th district (2017–present)
- Micah Lasher, state assemblymember from the 69th district (2025–present)
- Grace Lee, state assemblymember from the 65th district (2023–present)
- Linda Rosenthal, state assemblymember from the 67th district (2006–present)
- Tony Simone, state assemblymember from the 75th district (2023–present)
- Deborah Glick, state assemblymember from the 66th district (1991–present)
- Al Taylor, Assistant Speaker Pro Tempore of the New York State Assembly (2023–present) from the 71st district (2017–present)
- Jordan Wright, state assemblymember from the 70th district (2025–present)
- Jessica González-Rojas, state assemblymember from the 34th district (2021-present)
- Liz Krueger, state senator from the 28th district (2002–present)
- John Liu, former New York City Comptroller (2010–2014), state senator from the 16th district (2019–present)

Local officials

- Erik Bottcher, city councilmember from the 3rd district (2022–present)
- Gale Brewer, city councilmember from the 6th district (2001–2013, 2022–present) and former Manhattan Borough President (2014–2021)
- Ruth Messinger, former Manhattan Borough President (1990–1998)
- Yusef Salaam, city councilmember from the 9th district (2024–present)

Party officials

- Keith Wright, chair of the Manhattan Democratic Party (2009–present)

Individuals

- John Avlon, journalist and board chair of Citizens Union (second choice)

Labor unions

- 1199SEIU United Healthcare Workers East
- Communications Workers of America District 1 (first choice)
- Council of School Supervisors & Administrators (co-endorsement with Powers)

Organizations

- Citizens Union (second choice)
- Jim Owles Liberal Democratic Club
- LGBTQ+ Victory Fund
- Stonewall Democratic Club of New York

Newspapers

- The Jewish Voice (co-endorsement with Powers)
- Washington Square News
Keith Powers

U.S. senators

- Amy Klobuchar, U.S. senator from Minnesota (2007–present)

U.S. representatives

- Adriano Espaillat, U.S. representative from New York's 13th congressional district (2017–present)
- Ritchie Torres, U.S. representative from New York's 15th congressional district (2021–present)
- Nydia Velázquez, U.S. representative from New York's 7th congressional district (1993–present)

State legislators

- Rachel Storch, former Missouri state representative from the 64th district (2005–2011)

Local officials

- Diana Ayala, Deputy Speaker of the New York City Council (2022–present) from the 8th district (2017–present)
- Rubén Díaz Jr., former Bronx Borough President (2009–2021)

Individuals

- John Avlon, journalist and board chair of Citizens Union (first choice)
- Calvin Sun, physician and Borough President candidate (cross-endorsement)
- Uma Thurman, actress

Labor unions

- Actors' Equity Association
- Communications Workers of America District 1 (second choice)
- Council of School Supervisors & Administrators (co-endorsement with Hoylman-Sigal)
- District Council 37
- Hotel and Gaming Trades Council
- International Union of Painters and Allied Trades District Council 9
- LiUNA! New York
- NYC District Council of Carpenters
- SEIU 32BJ
- Teamsters Local 817
- United Federation of Teachers

Organizations

- Citizens Union (first choice)
- New York League of Conservation Voters

Newspapers

- The Jewish Voice (co-endorsement with Hoylman-Sigal)
Calvin Sun

Local officials

- Keith Powers, former Majority Leader of the New York City Council (2022–2024) from the 4th district (2018–present) and Borough President candidate (cross-endorsement)

==== Results ====

Hoylman-Sigal

30–40%
40–50%
50–60%
60–70%
70–80%
80–90%

Powers

30–40%
40–50%
50–60%
60–70%
70–80%

Sun

30–40%
40–50%
90–100%

Other

40–50% tie
No votes

Hoylman-Sigal

30–40%
40–50%
50–60%
60–70%
70–80%
80–90%

Powers

30–40%
40–50%
50–60%
60–70%
70–80%

Sun

30–40%
40–50%
90–100%

Other

No votes

Hoylman-Sigal

50–60%
60–70%
70–80%
80–90%
90–100%

Powers

50–60%
60–70%
70–80%
80–90%
90–100%

Other

50% tie
No votes

2025 Manhattan Borough President Democratic primary results
Party	Candidate	Maximum round	Maximum votes	Share in maximum round	Maximum votes First round votes Transfer votes
Democratic	Brad Hoylman-Sigal	3	140,279	54.7%	
Democratic	Keith Powers	3	115,944	45.3%	
Democratic	Calvin Sun	2	34,256	12.6%	
Write-in		1	1,691	0.6%	

=== Republican primary ===
==== Nominee ====
- Seson Adams

=== Working Families primary ===
==== Nominee ====
- Brad Hoylman-Sigal

=== General election ===
==== Endorsements ====
Brad Hoylman-Sigal

Organizations

- Planned Parenthood of Greater New York Votes PAC

==== Results ====
2025 Manhattan borough president election
Party	Candidate	Votes	%	±%
Democratic	Brad Hoylman-Sigal	333,495	69.72	
Working Families	Brad Hoylman-Sigal	52,444	10.96	
Total	Brad Hoylman-Sigal	385,939	80.68	
Republican	Seson Adams	81,376	17.01	
The Unity	Rolando Gomez	10,192	2.13	
Write-in		861	0.18	
Total votes		478,368	100%	

== Brooklyn ==
2025 Brooklyn Borough President election

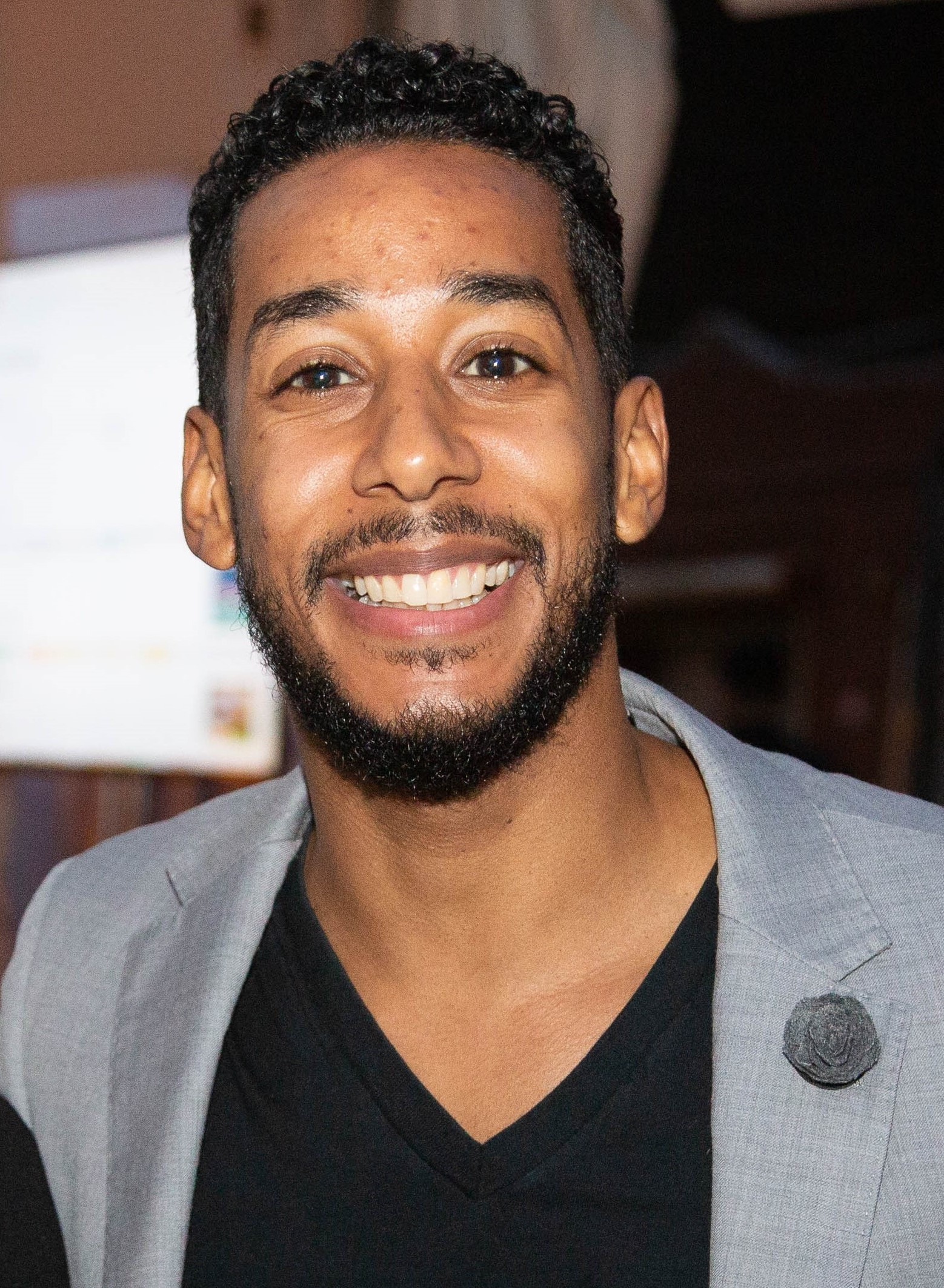

Nominee	Antonio Reynoso	Janine Acquafredda
Party	Democratic	Republican
Alliance	Working Families	Conservative
Popular vote	529,086	109,761
Percentage	82.80%	17.20%
- Precinct results Reynoso: 50–60% 60–70% 70–80% 80–90% >90% Acquafredda: 50–60% 60–70% 70–80% 80–90% >90% Tie: 50% No votes
Borough President before election
Antonio Reynoso
Democratic
Elected Borough President
Antonio Reynoso
Democratic

Incumbent Democrat Antonio Reynoso was eligible for re-election to a second term in office.

=== Democratic primary ===
==== Nominee ====
- Antonio Reynoso, incumbent borough president

==== Eliminated in primary ====
- Khari Edwards, activist and candidate for borough president in 2021

==== Declined ====
- Justin Brannan, city councilmember from the 47th district (2018–present) (running for Comptroller)

==== Endorsements ====
Khari Edwards

State legislators

- Brian Cunningham, state assemblymember from the 43rd district (2022–present)
- Latrice Walker, state assemblymember from the 55th district (2015–present)
- Stefani Zinerman, state assemblymember from the 56th district (2021–present)

Labor unions

- District Council 37
- United Federation of Teachers
Antonio Reynoso

U.S. representatives

- Dan Goldman, U.S. representative from New York's 10th congressional district (2023-present)
- Nydia Velázquez, U.S. representative from New York's 7th congressional district (1993-present)

Municipal officials

- Jumaane Williams, New York City Public Advocate (2019-present)

Individuals

- Ana Maria Archila, activist and co-director of the New York Working Families Party

Labor unions

- Actors' Equity Association
- Communications Workers of America District 1
- Communications Workers of America Local 1180
- Council of School Supervisors & Administrators
- International Union of Painters and Allied Trades District Council 9
- New York City Central Labor Council
- New York State Nurses Association
- NYC District Council of Carpenters
- SEIU 32BJ
- United Auto Workers Region 9A

Organizations

- Brooklyn Young Democrats
- Citizen Action of New York
- Indivisible Brooklyn
- Lambda Independent Democrats of Brooklyn
- Make the Road Action
- New York Communities for Change
- New York League of Conservation Voters
- Planned Parenthood Votes PAC
- Stonewall Democratic Club of New York
- Working Families Party

==== Results ====

Reynoso

50–60%
60–70%
70–80%
80–90%
90–100%

Edwards

50–60%
60–70%
90–100%

Other

40–50% tie
50% tie
No votes

Democratic primary results
Party	Candidate	Votes	%
Democratic	Antonio Reynoso (incumbent)	257,684	77.1
Democratic	Khari Edwards	75,021	22.4
Write-in		1,605	0.5
Total votes		334,310	100.0

=== Republican Party ===
==== Nominee ====
- Janine Acquafredda, real estate broker

=== Conservative Party ===
==== Nominee ====
- Janine Acquafredda, real estate broker

=== Working Families Party ===
==== Nominee ====
- Antonio Reynoso, incumbent borough president

=== Independents ===
==== Filed paperwork ====
- Shanduke McPhatter, nonprofit founder

=== General election ===
==== Endorsements ====
Antonio Reynoso

Organizations

- Planned Parenthood of Greater New York Votes PAC

==== Results ====
2025 Brooklyn borough president election
Party	Candidate	Votes	%	±%
Democratic	Antonio Reynoso	391,722	65.80	
Working Families	Antonio Reynoso	99,884	16.78	
Total	Antonio Reynoso (incumbent)	491,606	82.57	
Republican	Janine Acquafredda	90,566	15.21	
Conservative	Janine Acquafredda	11,967	2.01	
Total	Janine Acquafredda	102,533	17.22	
Write-in		1,212	0.20	
Total votes		595,351	100%	

== Queens ==
2025 Queens Borough President election

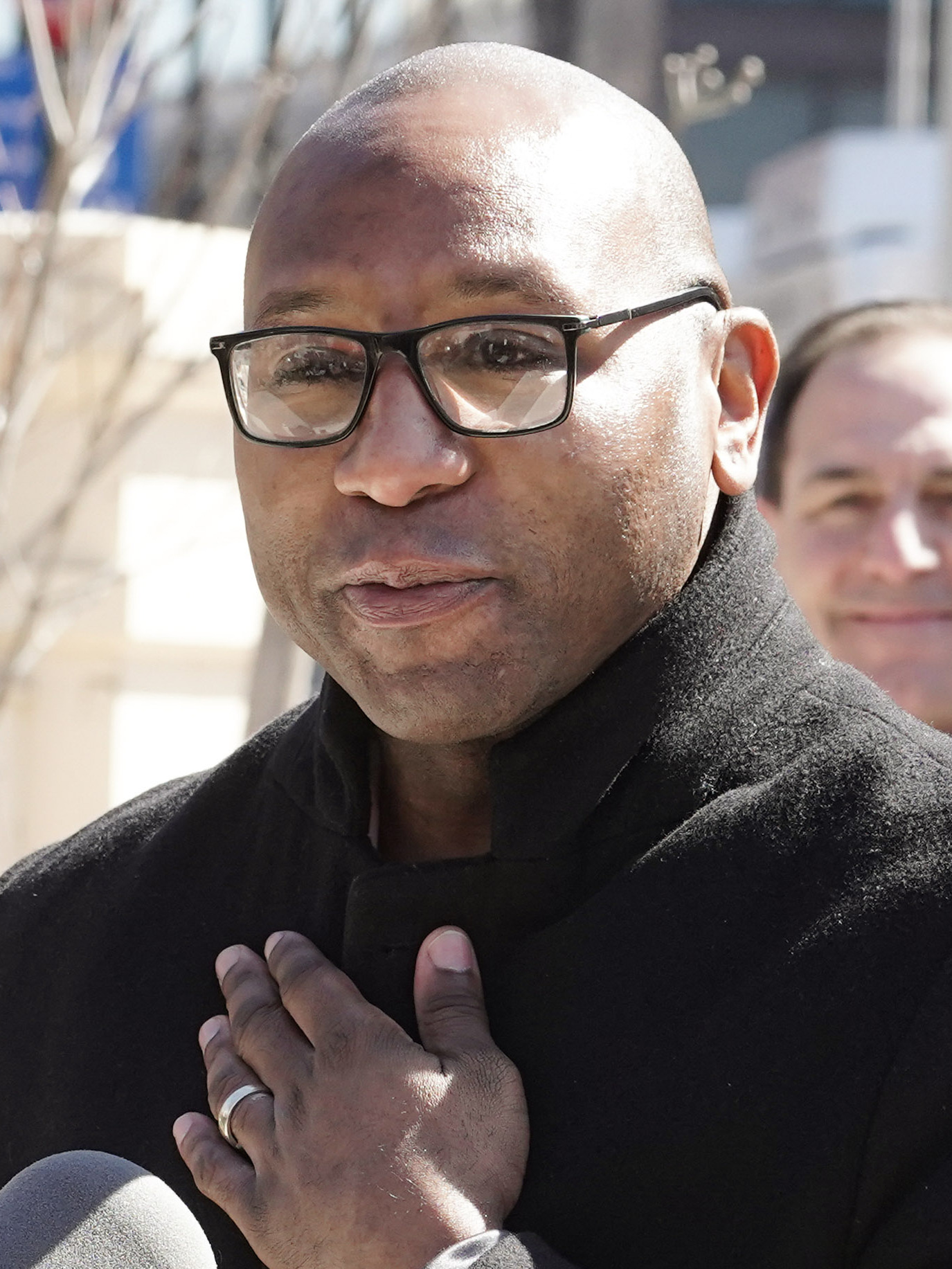

Nominee	Donovan Richards	Henry Ikezi
Party	Democratic	Republican
Popular vote	346,538	144,906
Percentage	70.50%	29.50%
- Precinct results Richards: 50–60% 60–70% 70–80% 80–90% >90% Ikezi: 50–60% 60–70% 70–80% 80–90% Tie: 50% No votes
Borough President before election
Donovan Richards
Democratic
Elected Borough President
Donovan Richards
Democratic

Incumbent Democrat Donovan Richards was eligible to run for re-election to a second full term in office.

=== Democratic primary ===
==== Nominee ====
- Donovan Richards, incumbent borough president

==== Endorsements ====
Donovan Richards

Labor unions

- 1199SEIU United Healthcare Workers East
- Communications Workers of America District 1
- Communications Workers of America Local 1180
- Council of School Supervisors & Administrators
- District Council 37
- International Union of Painters and Allied Trades District Council 9
- NYC District Council of Carpenters
- United Federation of Teachers

Organizations

- New York League of Conservation Voters
- Stonewall Democratic Club of New York

=== Republican primary ===
==== Nominee ====
- Henry Ikezi, real estate agent

=== Libertarian Party ===
==== Nominee ====
- Erwin Roque, real estate flipper

=== General election ===
==== Endorsements ====
Declined to endorse

Organizations

- Planned Parenthood of Greater New York Votes PAC

==== Results ====
2025 Queens borough president election
Party	Candidate	Votes	%	±%
Democratic	Donovan Richards (incumbent)	322,312	70.01	
Republican	Henry Ikezi	130,518	28.35	
United Alliance	Henry Ikezi	6,599	1.43	
Total	Henry Ikezi	137,117	29.78	
Write-in		979	0.21	
Total votes		460,408	100%	

== The Bronx ==
2025 Bronx Borough President election

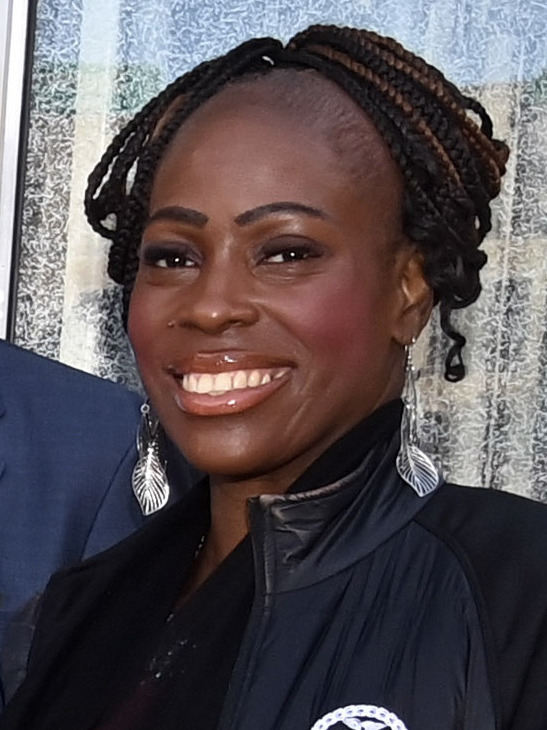

Nominee	Vanessa Gibson	Grace Marrero
Party	Democratic	Republican
Alliance	Working Families	Conservative
Popular vote	177,416	36,324
Percentage	83.00%	17.00%
- Precinct results Gibson: 50–60% 60–70% 70–80% 80–90% >90% Marrero: 50–60% 60–70% No votes
Borough President before election
Vanessa Gibson
Democratic
Elected Borough President
Vanessa Gibson
Democratic

Incumbent Democrat Vanessa Gibson was eligible for re-election to a second full term in office.

=== Democratic primary ===
==== Declared ====
- Vanessa Gibson, incumbent borough president
- Rafael Salamanca, city councilmember from the 17th district (2016–present) and candidate for borough president in 2021

==== Endorsements ====
Vanessa Gibson

U.S. representatives

- Adriano Espaillat, U.S. representative from New York's 13th congressional district (2017–present)
- George Latimer, U.S. representative from New York's 16th congressional district (2025–present)
- Ritchie Torres, U.S. representative from New York's 15th congressional district (2021–present)

Statewide officials

- Letitia James, Attorney General of New York (2019–present)

State legislators

- Jamaal Bailey, state senator from the 36th district (2017–present)
- Jeffrey Dinowitz, state assemblymember from the 81st district (1994–present)
- Nathalia Fernandez, state senator from the 34th district (2023–present)
- Carl Heastie, Speaker of the New York State Assembly (2015–present) from the 83rd district (2001–present)

Local officials

- Eric Dinowitz, city councilmember form the 11th district (2021–present)
- Jumaane Williams, New York City Public Advocate (2019-present)

Individuals

- Ana Maria Archila, activist and co-director of the New York Working Families Party

Labor unions

- 1199SEIU United Healthcare Workers East
- Communications Workers of America District 1
- Communications Workers of America Local 1180
- Council of School Supervisors & Administrators
- District Council 37
- International Union of Painters and Allied Trades District Council 9
- LiUNA! New York
- New York City Central Labor Council
- New York State Nurses Association
- NYC District Council of Carpenters
- SEIU 32BJ
- United Federation of Teachers

Organizations

- Bronx Democratic Party
- New York League of Conservation Voters
- Jim Owles Liberal Democratic Club
- Stonewall Democratic Club of New York
- Working Families Party
Rafael Salamanca

U.S. representatives

- Jamaal Bowman, former U.S. representative from New York's 16th congressional district (2021–2025)

State legislators

- Amanda Septimo, state assemblymember from the 84th district (2021–present)
- John Zaccaro Jr., state assemblymember from the 80th district (2023–present)

Local officials

- Fernando Ferrer, former chair of the Metropolitan Transportation Authority (2013, 2017, 2018–2019) and former Bronx Borough President (1987–2001)

Organizations

- Latino Victory Fund

==== Results ====

Gibson

40–50%
50–60%
60–70%
70–80%
80–90%
90–100%

Salamanca

50–60%
60–70%
70–80%

Other

40–50% tie
50% tie
No votes

Democratic primary results
Party	Candidate	Votes	%
Democratic	Vanessa Gibson (incumbent)	71,713	68.3
Democratic	Rafael Salamanca	32,700	31.2
Write-in		508	0.5
Total votes		104,921	100

=== Republican primary ===
==== Nominee ====
- Grace Marrero, Secretary of the Bronx Conservative Party

=== General election ===
==== Endorsements ====
Vanessa Gibson

Organizations

- Planned Parenthood of Greater New York Votes PAC

==== Results ====
2025 Bronx borough president election
Party	Candidate	Votes	%	±%
Democratic	Vanessa Gibson	150,590	74.55	
Working Families	Vanessa Gibson	16,254	8.05	
Total	Vanessa Gibson (incumbent)	166,844	82.59	
Republican	Grace Marrero	30,124	14.91	
Conservative	Grace Marrero	4,623	2.29	
Total	Grace Marrero	34,747	17.20	
Write-in		413	0.20	
Total votes		202,004	100%	

== Staten Island ==
2025 Staten Island Borough President election
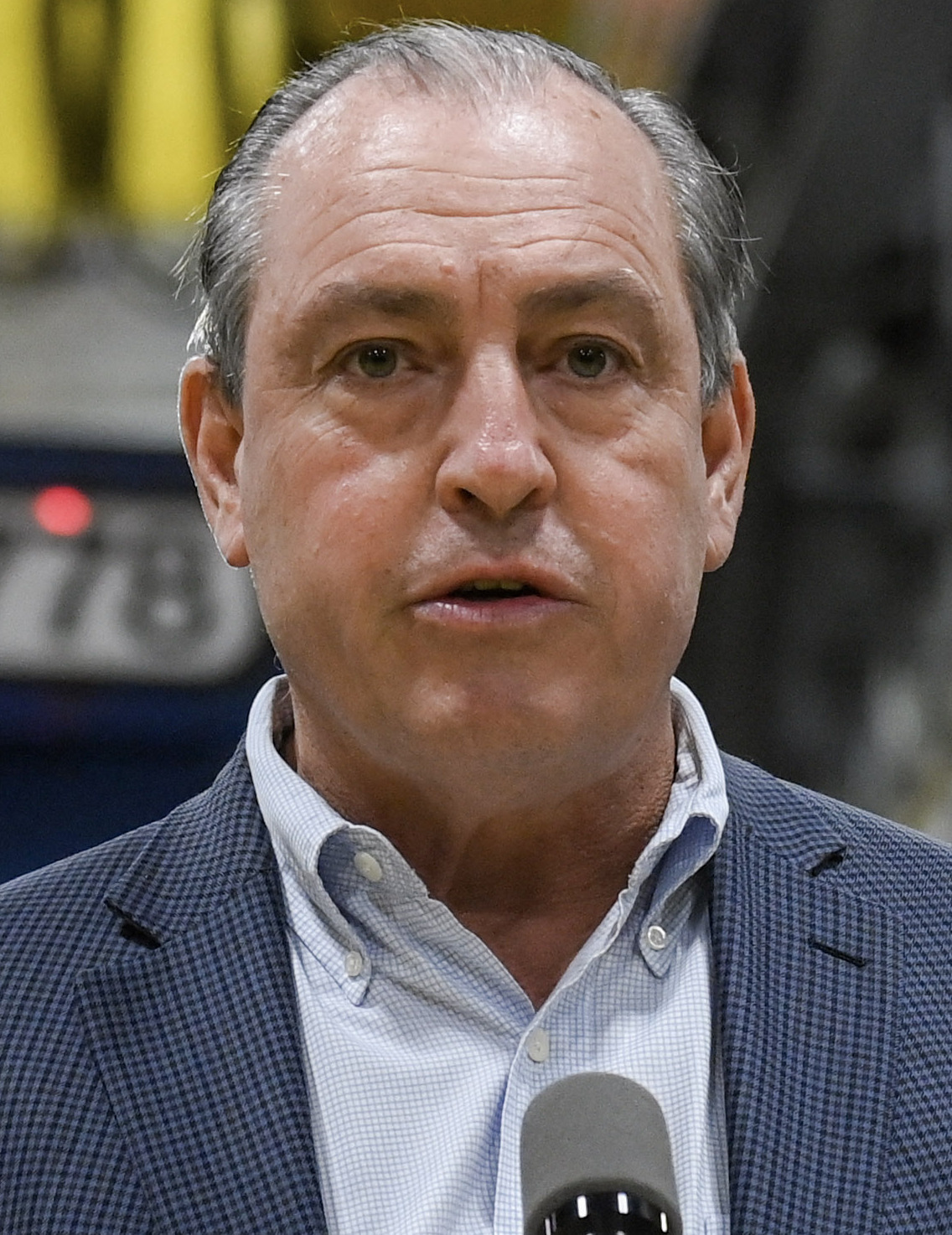

Nominee	Vito Fossella	Michael Colombo
Party	Republican	Democratic
Popular vote	98,168	46,369
Percentage	67.90%	32.10%
- Precinct results Fossella: 50–60% 60–70% 70–80% 80–90% >90% Colombo: 50–60% 60–70% 70–80% 80–90% >90% Tie: 50% No votes
Borough President before election
Vito Fossella
Republican
Elected Borough President
Vito Fossella
Republican

Incumbent Republican Vito Fossella was eligible to run for re-election to a second term in office.

=== Republican primary ===
==== Nominee ====
- Vito Fossella, incumbent borough president

==== Endorsements ====
Vito Fossella

Labor unions

- Council of School Supervisors & Administrators
- International Union of Painters and Allied Trades District Council 9

=== Democratic primary ===
==== Nominee ====
- Michael Colombo, insurance advocate

=== General election ===
==== Endorsements ====
Michael Colombo

Organizations

- Planned Parenthood of Greater New York
Vito Fossella

Newspapers and other media

- Staten Island Advance
- 77 WABC

==== Results ====
2025 Staten Island borough president election
Party	Candidate	Votes	%	±%
Republican	Vito Fossella (incumbent)	96,440	68.21	+8.14
Democratic	Michael Colombo	44,703	31.62	+0.77
Write-in		251	0.18	
Total votes		141,394	100%	
