= Vanessa Aronson =

American politician

- Aronson in Vietnam, published March 2013

Member-elect of the New York State Assembly from the 73rd district
- Assuming office January 1, 2027
- Succeeding: Alex Bores

Personal details
- Born: Vanessa Tantillo
- Party: Democratic
- Spouse: Reid Aronson
- Education: University of Chicago (BA); Harvard University (MPP); Relay Graduate School of Education (MAT)

Vanessa Tantillo Aronson is an American politician and a member-elect of the New York State Assembly for the 73rd district. Elected in November 2026, she ran unopposed in the primary and general elections. Aronson previously ran for the New York City Council's 4th district in the 2025 and 2017 elections, finishing second in the Democratic primary in 2025 and fifth in 2017.

Aronson previously worked as a senior director of the American Society for the Prevention of Cruelty to Animals, as a teacher, and as a Foreign Service Officer.

== Early life and career ==
Aronson graduated from the University of Chicago with a Bachelor of Arts, then Harvard University's Kennedy School of Government with a Master of Public Policy. Aronson then graduated from Relay Graduate School of Education with a Master of Arts in Teaching.

== Political career ==
=== 2017 New York City City Council campaign ===
Aronson first ran for the New York City Council in the 2017 election. She placed fifth in the Democratic primary election with 6.8% of the vote.

=== 2025 New York City City Council campaign ===
In the 2025 election, Aronson ran for the 4th district of the New York City Council. She placed second in the Democratic primary election with 46.9% of the vote, short of Virginia Maloney's 53.1% of the vote.

=== New York State Assembly ===
Aronson filed to run for the 73rd district of the New York State Assembly in anticipation of Alex Bores running for the U.S. House of Representatives in 2026. Aronson was unopposed in the Democratic and Working Families Party primary election.

== Electoral history ==
=== 2025 ===
2025 New York City Council election, District 4 Democratic primary
Party	Candidate	Maximum round	Maximum votes	Share in maximum round	Maximum votes First round votes Transfer votes
Democratic	Virginia Maloney	5	13,053	53.1%	
Democratic	Vanessa Aronson	5	11,517	46.9%	
Democratic	Rachel Storch	4	8,258	30.1%	
Democratic	Benjamin Wetzler	3	4,399	16.5%	
Democratic	Faith Bondy	2	2,325	7.9%	
Democratic	Lukas Florczak	2	505	1.7%	
Write-in		1	170	0.6%	

=== 2017 ===
2017 New York City Council election, District 4
Primary election
Party	Candidate	Votes	%
Democratic	Keith Powers	4,456	40.8
Democratic	Marti Speranza	2,493	22.8
Democratic	Rachel Honig	948	8.7
Democratic	Bessie Schachter	918	8.4
Democratic	Vanessa Aronson	746	6.8
Democratic	Maria Castro	503	4.6
Democratic	Jeffrey Mailman	482	4.4
Democratic	Barry Shapiro	232	2.1
Democratic	Alec Hartman	109	1.0
Write-in		25	0.2
Total votes		10,912	100
