= Innovation Diploma Plus High School =

Public school in New York City

Coordinates: 40°47′9.43″N 73°58′26.36″W

Innovation Diploma Plus High School is located on 145 West 84th Street within the Upper West Side of Manhattan. It is also one of the four schools that are located in the Louis D. Brandeis High School Campus.

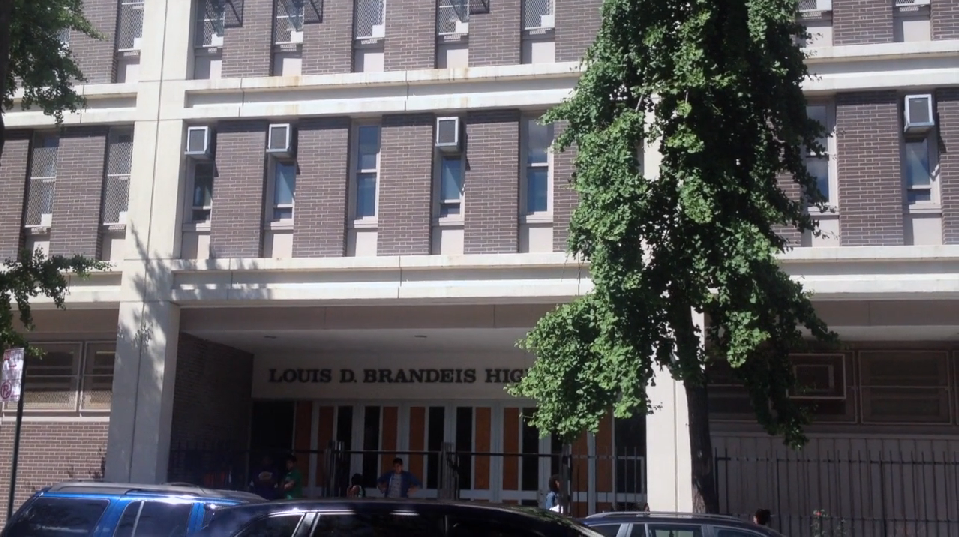
The outside of the Louis D. Brandeis High School Campus of where Innovation Diploma Plus High School is located on the right side of the fourth floor

== Overview ==
Innovation Diploma Plus High School also known as “IDP” is a transfer school which is run by The New York City Department of Education and in partnership with Alianza Dominicana Inc. Opened in the Fall of 2009, this school’s mission is to guide students towards completing their high school requirements, giving them a second chance to have an opportunity to be enrolled into several colleges and gain job experience.

According to founding principal, Casey Jones, the goal of the school is "for every graduate to be an authentic learner, gain the analytic and social skills needed to excel and become an active citizen for the information age. Before enrollment into Innovation Diploma Plus, every incoming student must go through an admission process which allow them and their parent to understand the qualities of what this school is offering".

== Admissions Process ==
To be eligible to become a full-time student at Innovation Diploma Plus High School, every incoming student must follow these procedures. First, an interview with their parent or guardian. Next, students must be at least of sixteen years of age and have attended another New York City Department of Education high school for at least one year and passed at least one New York state Regents Exam. Most important part is that he or she is willing and committed to return to a full-time high school.

== Student Resources ==
Resources are available for every student at Innovation Diploma Plus High school. This includes internships, portfolio development, school culture that promotes student leadership/strong engagement, New York States Regents and SATS Prep, community based support services for students and family members, job shadowing and other career preparation, and mentoring opportunities. Students have an opportunity to gain more experience in both academics and career.

== Clubs and Sports ==
Students can develop clubs and join sport activities. Clubs are developed by the student government by writing out a proposal in order to receive backing for equipment. Innovation Diploma Plus High School has a media (film and video) club, chess club, etc. Sports allow students to join the Louis D. Brandeis High School baseball, volleyball and basketball team.

== Possible 2012 Relocation and 2024 Merger ==
In December 2012, The New York City Department of Education issued a proposal to have Innovation Diploma Plus High School relocate to another building in Washington Heights, Manhattan without a gymnasium and science lab. Students who are parents will not have access to a daycare center for their children. In this proposal setting, the main cause for the move was to bring in another charter school within the Brandeis Campus.

Former City Councilwoman Eva Moskowitz, who runs Success Academy Charter Schools, opposed the proposal because she believed that "the Department of Education will undermine the education of at-risk students.”

in May, 2024 The New York City Department of Education issued another unrelated proposal to have Diploma Plus High School be merged with neighboring Frank McCourt High School.

Founder and Principal of Frank McCourt High School, Danielle Salzberg, reportedly was against the merger, citing substantial personal concerns and uncertainty. As of September, 2013 The New York City Department of Education has not continued with either its proposal, and Innovation Diploma Plus High School is still at its original location as of December, 2026.
