= Daniel Garodnick =

American politician (born 1972)

Dan Garodnick
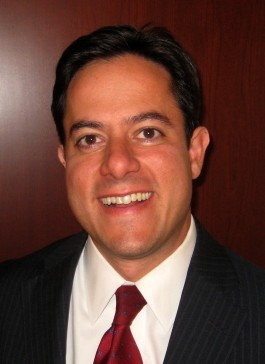

Chair of the New York City Planning Commission
- In office January 19, 2022 – January 2026
- Mayor: Eric Adams
- Preceded by: Anita Laremont
- Succeeded by: Sideya Sherman

Member of the New York City Council from the 4th district
- In office January 1, 2006 – December 31, 2017
- Preceded by: Eva Moskowitz
- Succeeded by: Keith Powers

Personal details
- Born: May 5, 1972 (age 54) New York, New York, U.S.
- Party: Democratic
- Spouse: Zoe Segal-Reichlin (m. 2008)
- Children: 2
- Education: Dartmouth College (BA); University of Pennsylvania (JD)
- Website: Official website

Daniel R. Garodnick (born May 5, 1972) is an American lawyer and a former Democratic New York City Councilmember for the 4th district. He served as the Chair of the New York City Planning Commission during the administration of Eric Adams. He also served as president and chief executive officer of the Riverside Park Conservancy.

== Early life and education ==
Garodnick was born in New York City and graduated from the Trinity School in 1990. He then received his B.A. from Dartmouth College in 1994. In 2000, he received a J.D. from the University of Pennsylvania Law School, where he was Editor-in-Chief of the University of Pennsylvania Law Review.

Between college and law school, Garodnick spent time in both Millen, Georgia and Portsmouth, Virginia helping to rebuild African American churches that had been burned by arson. He also spent two years working for the New York Civil Rights Coalition as the director of a program to teach New York City public school ways to combat racial discrimination, and how to use government to effect social change.

== Career ==
An attorney, Garodnick practiced as a litigator at the New York law firm of Paul, Weiss, Rifkind, Wharton & Garrison where he focused on securities litigation and internal investigations of companies. While there, he represented the Partnership for New York City in the successful Campaign for Fiscal Equity lawsuit regarding public school funding., and same-sex couples seeking marriage equality in New York State.

Prior to joining the firm, he served as a law clerk to Judge Colleen McMahon of the United States District Court for the Southern District of New York.

He served as a Member of the New York City Council for 12 years, President of Riverside Park Conservancy, and as Director of the Department of City Planning and Chair of the City Planning Commission.

=== New York City Council ===
Garodnick was elected to New York City Council in 2005, winning 63 percent of the vote in the general election and defeating both the Republican and Libertarian candidates. In the five-way Democratic primary that year he won 59% of the vote. He won reelection in 2009 and 2013.

During his twelve-year tenure, The New York Times praised Garodnick for his “independent streak” and noted that he had “distinguished himself in the fight to preserve middle-class housing.” The Wall Street Journal has called him “smart and fair” and POLITICO New York noted that he is known as a “policy wonk” who has “bucked the establishment."

In 2017, City & State called Garodnick a “no-nonsense negotiator.” Garodnick earned this reputation for repeatedly bringing parties to an agreement in difficult negotiations. In 2007, Garodnick successfully stepped in to broker an agreement between renowned Chef Daniel Boulud and the staff at his eponymous restaurant, who sought redress and compensation after Asian and Latino employees had been discriminated against and passed over for promotions. In 2008, when a developer proposed rezoning the largest stretch of undeveloped, privately owned land in Manhattan, Garodnick was able to adjust the plan to reduce the height of the towers, provide for acres of gardens and a school, as well as a $10 million contribution from the developer for a future pedestrian bridge over the FDR Drive. In 2015, when the de Blasio administration and Council Member Carlos Menchaca were at a logjam over the $115 million redevelopment of the South Brooklyn Marine Terminal, Garodnick helped broker an agreement between both sides.

Garodnick is best known for his work fighting for his childhood home in Stuyvesant Town and Peter Cooper Village, where he spearheaded the largest housing preservation deal in New York City history in 2015, with 5,000 units for middle-class families. He wrote a book on the subject, called "Saving Stuyvesant Town: How One Community Defeated the Worst Real Estate Deal in History," published by Three Hills Press, an imprint of Cornell University Press. He also negotiated the East Midtown Rezoning in 2017, covering an 80 block area in midtown Manhattan, which the Daily News said worked "stunningly well" almost immediately began to generate new commercial space, and to deliver significant public improvements to the area.

Garodnick's last term as councilman ended on December 31, 2017, when he was succeeded by Keith Powers.

Garodnick authored and passed over 60 laws during his tenure on the New York City Council.

=== New York City Council Speaker campaign ===
After exploring a race for New York City Comptroller., Garodnick instead ran for re-election in District 4 and for City Council Speaker. Garodnick was endorsed for Speaker by the Democratic Organizations of Queens, Bronx and Brooklyn, as well as the editorial board of The New York Times, which cited his independence and support for middle class housing. Melissa Mark-Viverito earned the support of newly-elected mayor Bill de Blasio, and defeated Garodnick on January 8, 2014.

=== City Planning ===
On February 7, 2022, Mayor Eric Adams appointed Garodnick as Director of the Department of City Planning, and Chair of the City Planning Commission. He led the administration’s ambitious land use agenda, which included three City of Yes initiatives—one for the environment, one for economic development, and one for housing—all of which were approved by the New York City Council. The economic development initiative was the largest expansion of manufacturing space in 60 years. The housing initiative, which allowed for additional housing throughout the city, including office conversions, transit oriented development, affordable housing bonuses and parking reforms, is expected to deliver 82,000 units of housing over 15 years, was the largest pro-housing zoning reform in the city's history. In February 2024, Garodnick was nominated by Mayor Adams to represent the city as a board member of the MTA.

Garodnick also advanced 5 neighborhood plans, near the new Metro-North Stations coming to the Bronx, on a key stretch of Atlantic Avenue in Brooklyn, in Manufacturing Districts in Midtown Manhattan, and Long Island City and downtown Jamaica in Queens. He successfully approved the Green Fast Track initiative which eliminates red tape and streamlines the environmental review process for small- and medium-sized all-electric residential developments. In July 2023, Garodnick was named in the top ten of City & State Newspaper's Real Estate Power 100., and in February 2025, number twenty in City & State's Power 100 in New York City government.

On January 8, 2026, Garodnick announced that he would be stepping down from his position at the Department of City Planning.

== Personal life ==
In May 2008, Garodnick married Zoe Segal-Reichlin, general counsel of Everytown for Gun Safety. They have two children.

== Election history ==
New York City Council: District 4
Election	Candidate	Party	Votes	Pct	Candidate	Party	Votes	Pct	Candidate	Party	Votes	Pct	Candidate	Party	Votes	Pct
2005 Primary	Dan Garodnick	Dem	7,270	58.01%	Jack Lester	Dem	2,116	16.89%	Meryl Brodsky	Dem	2,015	16.08%	Jack Karako	Dem	1,113	9.03%
2005 General	Dan Garodnick	Dem	23,304	63.77%	Patrick M. Murphy	Rep	13,153	35.24%	Jak Karako	Lib	370	0.99%				
2009 General	Dan Garodnick	Dem	23,431	74.60%	Ashok G. Chandra	Rep	7,972	25.40%								
2013 General	Dan Garodnick	Dem	21,366	70.51%	Helene Jnane	Rep	8,911	29.49%								

New York City Council
Preceded by Eva Moskowitz	Member of the New York City Council from the 4th district 2006–2017	Succeeded by Keith Powers
