= Virginia Maloney =

American politician

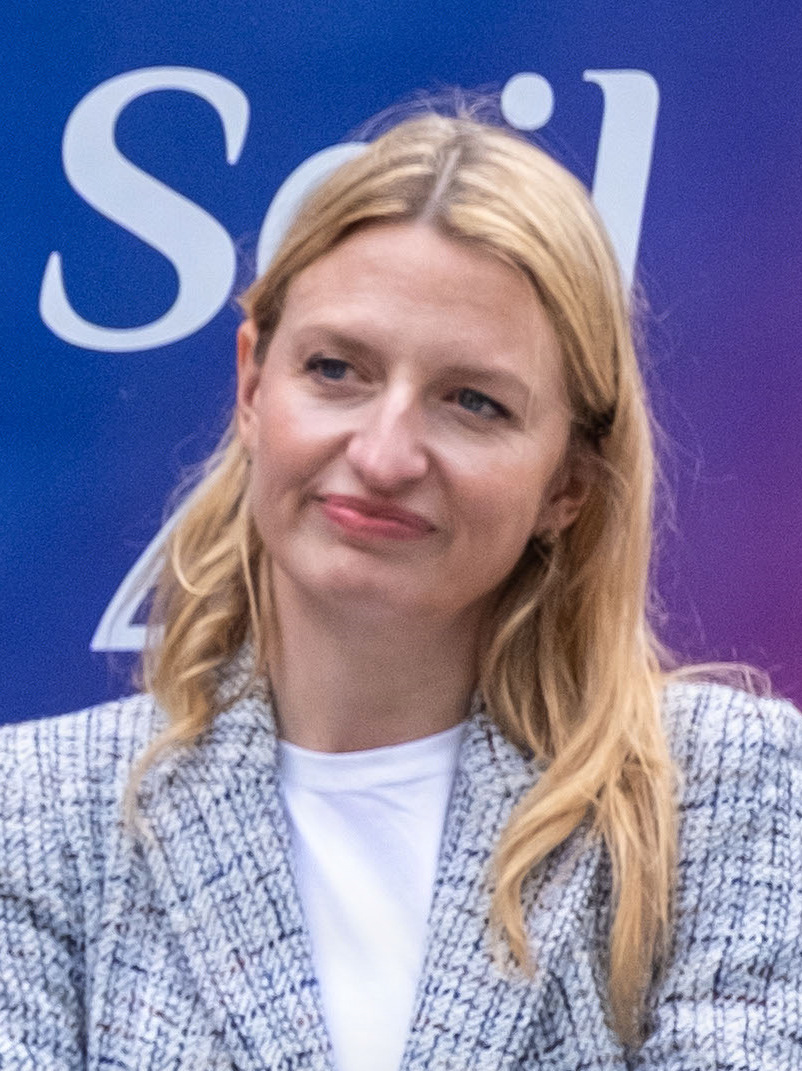
- Maloney in 2026

Member of the New York City Council from the 4th district
- Incumbent
- Assumed office January 1, 2026
- Preceded by: Keith Powers

Personal details
- Born: 1987 or 1988 (age 38–39) New York City, U.S.
- Party: Democratic
- Parents: Carolyn Maloney (mother); Clifton Maloney (father)
- Education: Princeton University (BA); Harvard University (MPA); Massachusetts Institute of Technology (MBA)
- Website: council.nyc.gov/district-4/

Virginia Maloney is an American politician, former technology executive, and member of the New York City Council representing the 4th district in Manhattan following her election victory in November 2025. She serves as Chair of the Council's Committee on Economic Development, where she has focused on small business policy, housing, government modernization, and public safety. Prior to elected office, she worked in economic development, federal infrastructure consulting, and the technology sector, including at Meta.

== Early life and education ==
Maloney was born and raised on Manhattan's East Side, where she attended Spence School before graduating from the Groton School. She earned a Bachelor of Arts in Public Policy and Environmental Studies from Princeton University, a Master of Public Administration from the Harvard Kennedy School, and a Master of Business Administration from the MIT Sloan School of Management.

== Career ==
Prior to entering elected office, Maloney worked in both the public and private sectors.

She began her career in federal consulting, overseeing infrastructure and transportation projects related to the Northeast Corridor high-speed rail program during the Obama administration.

She later worked at the New York City Economic Development Corporation during the Bloomberg administration, where she worked on infrastructure and technology initiatives, including projects related to expanding public broadband access throughout New York City.

Maloney subsequently joined Meta, where she served as a product manager leading teams responsible for accessibility products and technology initiatives.

== 2025 New York City Council campaign ==
Maloney entered the open race to succeed term-limited Council Member Keith Powers in District 4 in 2025. Her platform has focused on affordability, public safety, government reform, and using technology to modernize city services. Maloney won the Democratic primary on July 1, 2025, after ranked-choice tabulation by the New York City Board of Elections.

== Tenure ==
Since taking office in 2026, Maloney has served as Chair of the Committee on Economic Development.

As committee chair, she has overseen hearings on small business policy, tourism, commercial revitalization, artificial intelligence, and New York City's preparations for the 2026 FIFA World Cup. She has also advocated for expanding support for neighborhood businesses and improving transparency in the city's permitting process.

Maloney's first enacted legislation required New York City to assist houses of worship and nonprofit organizations in developing emergency preparedness and threat response plans.

She has introduced legislation to establish a Legacy Business Registry and Preservation Fund, create technology and artificial intelligence training programs for small businesses, increase transparency in the city's permitting process, reduce e-bike speed limits, and establish oversight of artificial intelligence systems used by municipal government.

During the Fiscal Year 2027 budget process, Maloney secured funding for projects within Manhattan's 4th district, including investments in Bellevue Hospital, Hunter College, the CUNY Graduate Center, and community organizations.

She has also sponsored and supported resolutions recognizing the Equal Rights Amendment, commemorating the New York Knicks, and co-naming streets in honor of football players Thierry Henry and Pelé during the 2026 FIFA World Cup.

== Recognition ==
In October 2025, Maloney was named to City & State New York's "2025 40 Under 40: Rising Stars of New York" list.

== Political positions ==
Maloney has identified economic development, housing affordability, public safety, government modernization, and support for small businesses as central priorities during her tenure on the City Council.

She has advocated for expanding affording housing, preserving legacy businesses, improving bicycle and e-bike safety, strengthening services for older adults, modernizing city government through technology, and expanding protections for reproductive rights and LGBTQ+ New Yorkers.

Virginia Maloney and Carolyn Maloney appeared together on an episode of Inside City Hall on NY1 in May 2026. During the interview, they verbally urged members of Congress to finally pass the Equal Rights Amendment.

== Personal life ==
Maloney is the daughter of former U.S. Representative and former New York City Council member Carolyn Maloney.

== Electoral history ==
=== 2025 ===
2025 New York City Council Democratic primary, District 4
Party	Candidate	Maximum round	Maximum votes	Share in maximum round	Maximum votes First round votes Transfer votes
Democratic	Virginia Maloney	5	13,053	53.1%	
Democratic	Vanessa Aronson	5	11,517	46.9%	
Democratic	Rachel Storch	4	8,258	30.1%	
Democratic	Benjamin D. Wetzler	3	4,769	16.5%	
Democratic	Faith A. Bondy	2	2,325	7.9%	
Democratic	Lukas Florczak	2	505	1.7%	
Write-In		1	170	0.6%	

2025 New York City Council election, District 4
Party	Candidate	Votes	%
Democratic	Virginia Maloney	43,247	68.9
Republican	Debra Schwartzben	16,868	26.9
Revive East Side	Kyle Athayde	2,573	4.1
Write-in		125	0.2
Total votes		62,813	100.0
Democratic hold			
