= Carolyn Maloney =

American politician (born 1946)

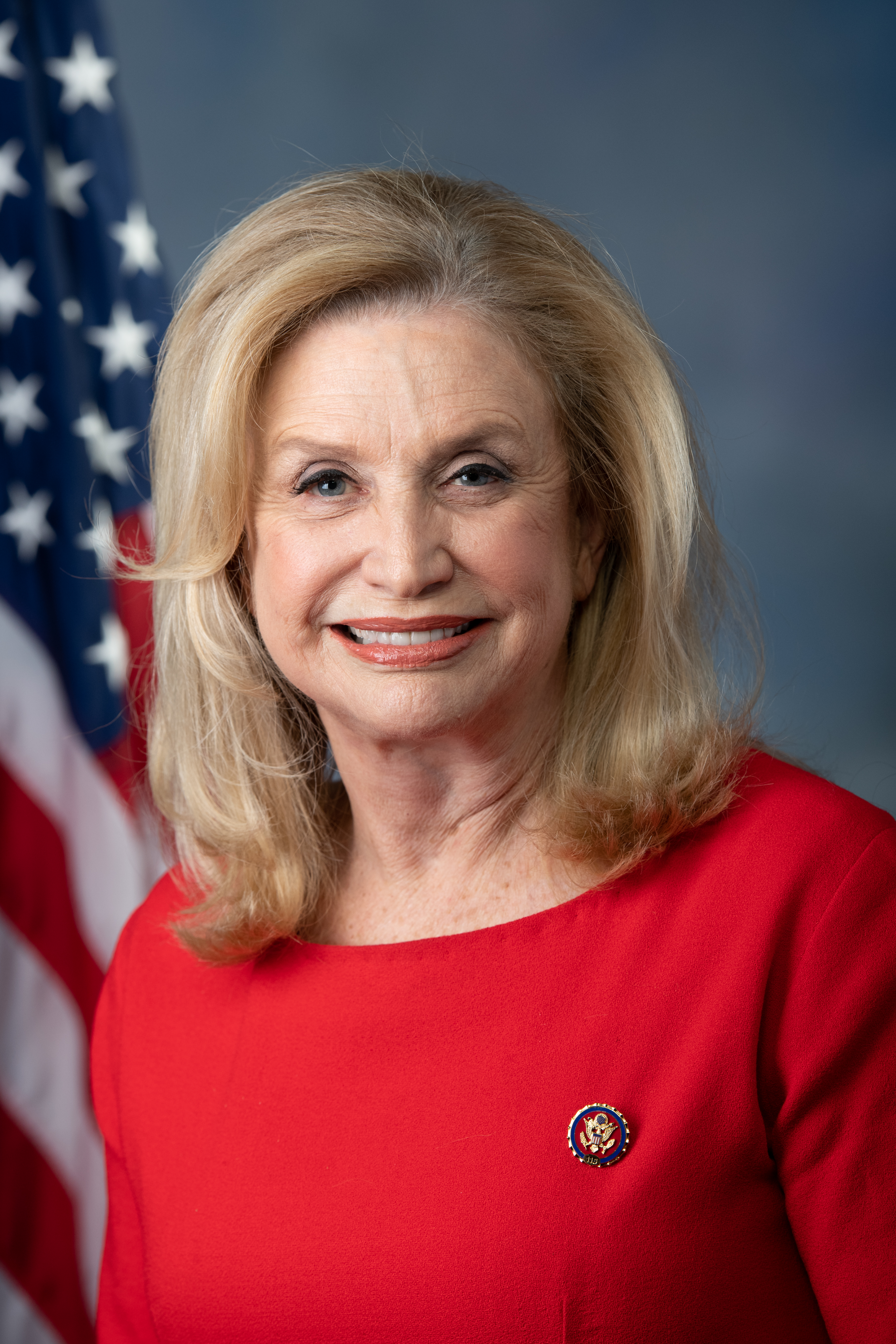
- Official portrait, 2019

Chair of the House Oversight Committee
- In office October 17, 2019 – January 3, 2023; Acting: October 17, 2019 – November 20, 2019
- Preceded by: Elijah Cummings
- Succeeded by: James Comer

Vice Chair of the Joint Economic Committee
- In office January 3, 2019 – January 16, 2020
- Preceded by: Mike Lee
- Succeeded by: Don Beyer

Member of the U.S. House of Representatives from New York
- In office January 3, 1993 – January 3, 2023
- Preceded by: Bill Green (redistricted)
- Succeeded by: Jerry Nadler (redistricted)
- Constituency: 14th district (1993–2013); 12th district (2013–2023)

Member of the New York City Council
- In office January 1, 1983 – January 3, 1993
- Preceded by: Robert Rodriguez
- Succeeded by: Andrew Sidamon-Eristoff
- Constituency: 8th district (1983–1991); 4th district (1992–1993)

Personal details
- Born: Carolyn Jane Bosher; February 19, 1946 (age 80) Greensboro, North Carolina, U.S.
- Party: Democratic
- Spouse: Clifton Maloney (m. 1976; died 2009)
- Children: 2, including Virginia
- Education: Greensboro College (BA)
- Maloney's voice Maloney on reauthorizing the Debbie Smith Act. Recorded October 23, 2019

Carolyn Jane Maloney (née Bosher, February 19, 1946) is an American politician who represented parts of New York City as member of the U.S. House of Representatives from 1993 to 2023. She initially represented the 12th district from 1993 to 2013 and was redistricted to the 14th district from 2013 to 2023. The district included most of Manhattan's East Side, Astoria and Long Island City in Queens, Greenpoint, Brooklyn, as well as Roosevelt Island. A member of the Democratic Party, Maloney ran for reelection in 2022 but lost the primary to 10th district incumbent Jerry Nadler after redistricting drew them both into the 12th district.

Maloney was the first woman to represent New York City's 7th Council district (where she was the first woman to give birth while in office). Maloney was also the first woman to chair the Joint Economic Committee. On October 17, 2019, she became the first woman to chair the House Committee on Oversight and Reform following the death of Elijah Cummings. On November 20, 2019, Maloney was formally chosen to succeed Cummings.

== Early life, education, and career ==
Carolyn Jane Bosher was born in Greensboro, North Carolina, on February 19, 1946. She attended Greensboro College. After graduating, she visited New York City in 1970, and decided to stay.

For several years, she worked as a teacher and an administrator for the New York City Board of Education. In 1977, she obtained a job working for the New York State Legislature, and held senior staff positions in both the State Assembly and the State Senate. In 1976 she married Clifton Maloney, an investment banker.

== New York City Council ==
Maloney was elected to the New York City Council in 1982, defeating incumbent Robert Rodriguez in a heavily Spanish-speaking district based in East Harlem and parts of the South Bronx. She served as a council member for 10 years. On the council, she served as the first chair of the Committee on Contracts, investigating contracts issued by New York City in sludge and other areas. She authored legislation creating the city's Vendex program, which established computerized systems tracking information on city contracts and vendors doing business with the city. Maloney also introduced the first measure in New York to recognize domestic partnerships, including those of same-sex couples. She was the first person to give birth while serving as a council member, and the first to offer a comprehensive package of legislation to make day care more available and affordable.

== U.S. House of Representatives ==
=== Elections ===
In 1992, Maloney ran for Congress in what was then the 14th district. The district had previously been the 15th, represented by 15-year incumbent Bill Green, a progressive Republican. She won with 51% of the vote. The district, nicknamed the "silk stocking district", had been one of the few in the city in which Republicans usually did well; in fact, they held the seat for all but eight of the 56 years between 1937 and Maloney's victory. However, redistricting made the district significantly friendlier to Democrats. The old 15th had been more or less coextensive with the Upper East Side, but the new 14th included Long Island City, portions of the Upper West Side, and a sliver of Brooklyn. Maloney also benefited from Bill Clinton's strong showing in the district.

The core of Maloney's district was the Upper East Side, an area with a history of electing moderate Republicans. Their dominance waned throughout the 1990s, and by the early 2000s Democrats dominated every level of government. This was exemplified in 1994 (the year of the Republican Revolution), when Maloney easily turned back a challenge from Republican City Councilman Charles Millard. Millard was the last reasonably well-financed Republican to run in the district; he was the last Republican to manage even 30 percent of the vote.

In 2004, Maloney faced a potential Democratic primary challenge from Robert Jereski, a former Green Party political candidate and unsuccessful candidate for delegate to the 2004 Democratic National Convention on the slate of Dennis Kucinich. Jereski opposed the Iraq War while Maloney had initially voted for the resolution to authorize force; she later renounced the war, including at a town hall meeting in her district with antiwar Congressman John Murtha, where her comments made headlines. Jereski failed to qualify for the ballot because his petition was found to have invalid signatures, leaving him four short of the 1,250 required.

In December 2008, Maloney hired a public-relations firm to help bolster her efforts to be named by Governor David Paterson as Hillary Clinton's successor in the U.S. Senate. She toured parts of the state, but was overshadowed by Caroline Kennedy's promotional tour for the same seat. Maloney interviewed with Paterson for 55 minutes. Public opinion polls placed Maloney's support for the Senate seat in the single digits, trailing the front-runner, then-State Attorney General Andrew Cuomo, although her bid was endorsed by the National Organization for Women Political Action Committee, the Feminist Majority Political Action Committee, New York Times columnist Nicholas Kristof, and other columnists and editorial boards.

On January 23, 2009, Paterson chose Representative Kirsten Gillibrand. Since Gillibrand is from upstate, many in NYC's political circles urged Maloney to primary Gillibrand in 2010. Despite leading Gillibrand in the polls, she instead ran to retain her congressional seat. A decade later, Maloney was the sole member of Congress to endorse Gillibrand's 2020 presidential campaign.

In the Democratic primary for Congress on September 14, 2010, Maloney defeated a well-funded opponent, Reshma Saujani, a 34-year-old Indian-American hedge fund lawyer, by 62 percentage points. That night, Saujani said, "I'm definitely running again", but three months later announced publicly that she would not challenge Maloney again.

In 2012 Maloney's Republican challenger was Christopher Wright, who took a leave of absence from J. P. Morgan to campaign. Maloney won with 80.9% of the vote, a margin of over 120,000 votes.

In 2014, Maloney defeated Republican nominee Nicholas Di Iorio, a financial contractor with Pfizer, with 80% of the vote.

In the 2016 Democratic primary, Maloney defeated Pete Lindner with 90.1% of the vote. She defeated Republican Robert Ardini in the general election with 83.2% of the vote.

In the 2018 Democratic primary, Maloney defeated progressive candidate Suraj Patel with 59.6% of the vote. In the general election she defeated Republican nominee Eliot Rabin with 86.4% of the vote.

In the 2020 Democratic primary, Patel challenged Maloney again, as did progressive Democrat Lauren Ashcraft and housing activist Peter Harrison. Erica Vladimer, a co-founder of New York State's Sexual Harassment Working Group, withdrew from the race before the primary. By July 29, 2020, it was revealed that Maloney led Patel by about 4% and 3,700 votes. On August 4, 2020, local election officials declared Maloney the winner of the primary.

The redistricting process of 2022 merged Maloney's district with the neighboring 10th district, represented by another member of the large Democratic freshman class of 1993, Jerry Nadler. The newly combined seat retained Maloney's district number, but was geographically more Nadler's district. Maloney challenged Nadler in the primary in August of that year, and lost by thirty points.

=== Tenure ===
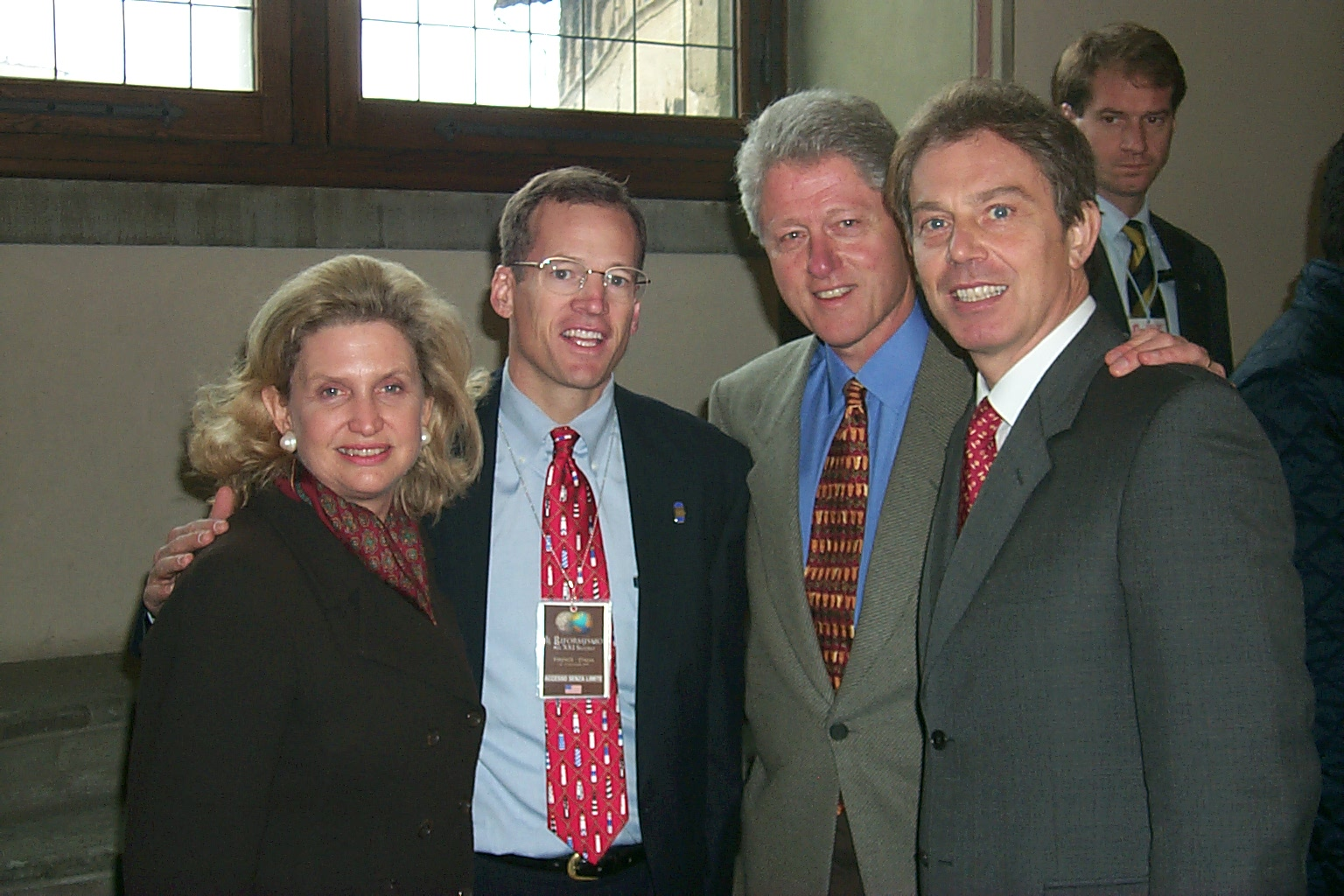
Maloney with President Bill Clinton, Tony Blair, and Jack Kingston in 1999

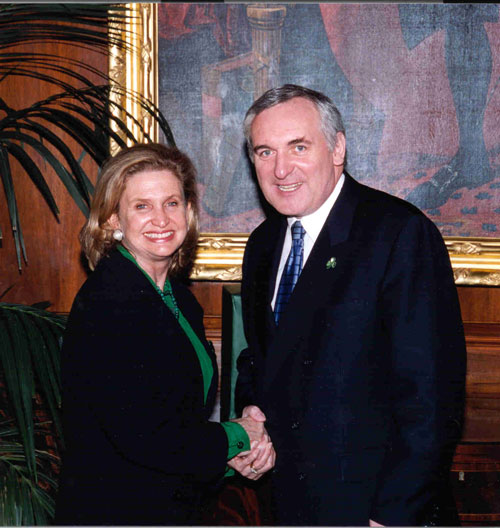
Maloney with Bertie Ahern in 2001

In 2009, the National Journal's annual ranking placed Maloney as the 114th-most liberal (or 314th-most conservative) member of Congress, with more liberal scores on foreign policy than on economic and social policy. Her score of 75.5 ranked her as modestly more liberal than the New York Congressional delegation as a whole.

In 2011, a Daily News survey found that Maloney ranked first among New York's 28 representatives for activity with 36 proposed bills, resolutions, and amendments. In the 2013 legislative session, Govtrack.us scored her third among House Democrats for "Leadership", third among all representatives for "Powerful Co-sponsors", third-highest in the New York delegation for "Working with the Senate", and fifth-highest among all representatives for "Bills Sponsored". During the 2014 election cycle, the New York Daily News ran a story that said, "Maloney has proposed more legislation than any other House member, according to records", and called her "James Zadroga 9/11 Health and Compensation Act, giving compensation to Ground Zero workers who have fallen ill, as big a bill for the New York area as any in the last decade."

For the 2015 legislative session, Govtrack.us scored Maloney first for "Leadership" among House Democrats, based on sponsoring the most bills. It scored her second among all representatives for having the most co-sponsors, second for "Working with the Senate" and fourth among House Democrats for having powerful cosponsors. She was ranked in the top 10% of all representatives for bills introduced ("Maloney introduced 26 bills and resolutions in 2015").

As a U.S. Representative, Maloney was a superdelegate at presidential conventions. In the 2016 election cycle she was an early supporter of former Secretary of State and Senator Hillary Clinton. According to her 2018 GovTrack Report card Maloney ranked in the 80th percentile among House members for getting bicameral support for the bills she has introduced; she ranked sixth among House Democrats.

In 2019, Govtrack.us ranked Maloney as the top legislative leader in the House. This analysis ranked her second among all representatives for the most co-sponsors on her bills, in the top 5% for the number of bills introduced, and in the top 10% for getting her bills out of committee.

For her tenure as chair of the House Oversight and Reform Committee in the 116th Congress, Maloney earned an "A" grade from the nonpartisan Lugar Center's Congressional Oversight Hearing Index.

In 2021 the Center for Effective Lawmaking ranked Maloney the third-most effective lawmaker in the House.

==== 9/11-related issues ====
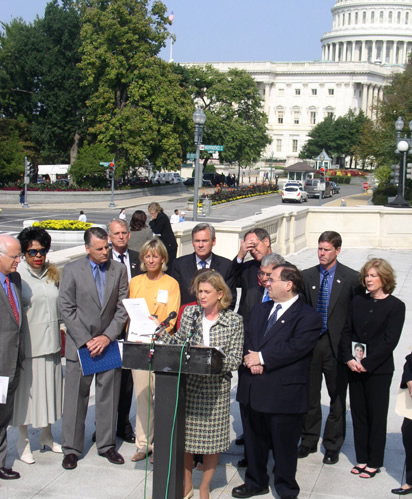
Maloney speaks at a press conference with members of the 9/11 Commission and 9/11 families in 2004

Following the terrorist attacks of September 11, 2001, Maloney advocated for federal help for New York's recovery and security efforts. Her efforts prompted Wayne Barrett of the Village Voice to write that Maloney was "like a tiger in the House on every dollar due New York."

On February 25, 2019, she introduced her Never Forget the Heroes Act, HR1327 in the 116th Congress—a bill to establish Permanent Authorization of the September 11 Victim Compensation Fund Act. The $10.2 billion authorization was signed into law, establishing that both the World Trade Center Health Program and September 11 Victim Compensation are effectively permanent, with the WTCHP authorized to operate until 2090 and the VCF until 2092.

==== National security issues ====
After the 9/11 Commission published its findings, Maloney co-founded the bipartisan House 9/11 Commission Caucus and helped write and secure the enactment into law of many of its recommendations to reform the nation's intelligence agencies Congressional Quarterly wrote in its annual guide, 2006 Politics in America: "In the 108th Congress, Maloney reached out beyond her usual roles as a liberal gadfly and persistent Bush administration critic, helping win enactment of a sweeping bill to reorganize U.S. intelligence operations."

Following the Dubai Ports World controversy, Maloney helped secure the passage and enactment of her bill to reform the system for vetting foreign investments in the United States. She has supported Scientology's "New York Rescue Workers Detoxification Project".

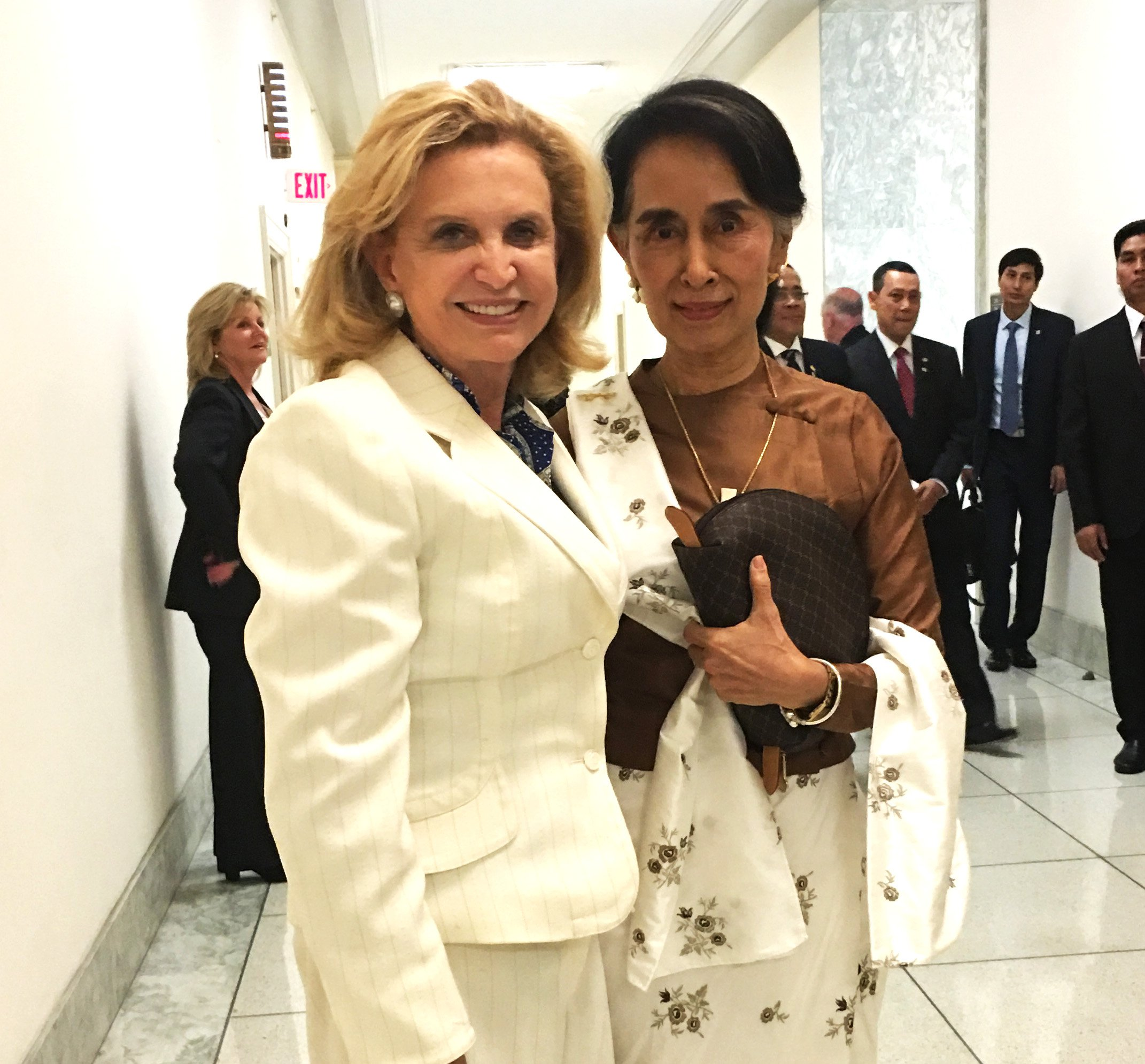
Maloney with State Counsellor of Myanmar and Nobel Peace Prize laureate Aung San Suu Kyi in September 2016

On October 1, 2020, Maloney co-signed a letter to Secretary of State Mike Pompeo that condemned Azerbaijan’s offensive operations against the Armenian-populated enclave of Nagorno-Karabakh, denounced Turkey’s role in the Nagorno-Karabakh conflict, and criticized "false equivalence between Armenia and Azerbaijan, even as the latter threatens war and refuses to agree to monitoring along the line of contact."

Maloney, who chaired the House Oversight and Reform Committee at the time, called on FBI Director Christopher A. Wray to open a probe into social media platform Parler, writing, "The company was founded by John Matze shortly after he traveled in Russia with his wife, who is Russian and whose family reportedly has ties to the Russian government."

==== Gun control ====
In response to a number of high-profile incidents of gun violence, Maloney sponsored two bills to address the issue. The Gun Trafficking Prevention Act of 2013 would make gun trafficking a federal crime for the first time and substantially stiffen the penalties for "straw buyers" who knowingly help convicted felons, domestic abusers, the violently mentally ill and others, obtain guns.

In 2014, she joined Senator Ed Markey in sending President Barack Obama a letter asking him to insert $10 million into the budget for the Centers for Disease Control and Prevention to resume research on gun violence and "conduct scientific research on the causes and prevention of gun violence."

In 2022, as chair of the House Oversight and Reform Committee, Maloney held a hearing that examined leading gun manufacturers' marketing and sales practices.

==== Government transparency ====
Maloney introduced a bill in October 2003 intended to enforce transparency in relation to military contracting in Iraq and subject the Coalition Provisional Authority to federal procurement law. In 2008, after reports of corruption among military contractors in both Iraq and Afghanistan, she secured House passage of a further bill to create a database to better monitor all federal contracts, the key provisions of which were adopted into law as part of the defense budget.

In 2010, the Project On Government Oversight, a government watchdog group, presented Maloney with its Good Government Award for her contributions to government transparency and oversight, including her investigations into corruption and mismanagement in the Minerals Management Service and her support of a Federal Contractor Misconduct Database similar to POGO's.

In 2019, Maloney introduced a bill that would require corporate entities to disclose the identities of beneficial owners to FinCEN, making it harder for them to hide assets and avoid taxes through a series of limited liability companies.

==== Healthcare ====
Maloney has taken several actions on health care issues. Her measure to provide Medicare coverage for annual mammograms was included in the Fiscal Year 1998 federal budget. She advocated for providing federal support for medical monitoring and health care for rescue and recovery workers who were exposed to toxic smoke and dust at the Ground Zero site after the 9/11 attacks. Maloney authored the James Zadroga 9/11 Health and Compensation Act and led the fight for years to push for its passage. In 2010 Obama signed the bill into law. It provides $4.3 billion in federal funds to provide 9/11 responders and survivors with treatment and compensation for their injuries. In June 2012, it was announced that the program would be expanded to cover care for a variety of cancers of the lung, trachea, stomach, colon, rectum, liver, bladder, kidney, thyroid and breast.

In 2015 when roughly 33,000 responders and survivors were battling an assortment of ailments, Maloney led the effort to extend the bill permanently. After a prolonged and very public push, a total of $8.5 billion in funding was included in the Omnibus Spending bill that passed in 2015 and extended the life of the monitoring and health insurance coverage for 75 years. In the 111th Congress, Maloney introduced The Breastfeeding Promotion Act to protect breastfeeding in the workplace under civil rights law and make it illegal for women to lose their jobs or otherwise be discriminated against for expressing milk during lunchtime or on breaks. She has advocated for international women's health and family planning programs supported by the United Nations Population Fund.

A co-founder and co-chair of the Congressional Working Group on Parkinson's Disease, Maloney serves on the board of the Michael Stern Parkinson's Research Foundation and previously served as an honorary board member of the Fisher Center for Alzheimer's Research Foundation.

Maloney has promoted scientifically discredited claims of a link between vaccines and autism. On several occasions, she has introduced legislation that would direct the federal government to conduct studies into the alleged links between autism and vaccines. In 2008, she participated in an anti-vaccine rally led by actors Jenny McCarthy and Jim Carrey. In a 2012 congressional hearing, Maloney equated concerns over a link between autism and vaccines to concerns over a link between smoking and cancer. She said that it was "common sense that [smoking] was bad for your health... The same thing seems to be here with the vaccinations."

Maloney's views on vaccines changed, and she led efforts to bring COVID-19 vaccine sites to North Brooklyn and western Queens. She partnered with The Floating Hospital and the New York City Housing Authority to establish a modular site to provide COVID-19 testing and vaccination services at Astoria Houses in northwest Queens.

In August 2022, Maloney expressed regret for her previous anti-vaccine positions when the subject was brought up during a podcast appearance.

==== Financial and economic issues ====
Maloney serves on the Committee on Financial Services and the Committee on Oversight and Government Reform, and is the Ranking Democratic member of the Joint Economic Committee. She previously chaired the Democratic Task Force on Homeland Security. From 2009 to 2011, Maloney chaired the Joint Economic Committee, the first woman to do so.

Maloney was the author of the Credit Cardholders' Bill of Rights, or the Credit CARD Act of 2009, while serving as chair of the Subcommittee on Financial Institutions and Consumer Credit, in the 110th Congress. A 2014 Social Science Research Network study estimated that since its passage, the CARD Act has saved consumers $11.9 billion per year. Credit card companies fiercely opposed the measure, but it drew praise from editorial boards and consumer advocates. The bill was passed as the Credit Card Accountability Responsibility and Disclosure Act by both houses of the 111th Congress, prompting Money magazine to dub Maloney the "best friend a credit card user ever had." Obama signed the Credit Card Bill of Rights into law in a Rose Garden ceremony Maloney attended on May 22, 2009.

Days after voting against cancellation of a $1 billion, 10-year subsidy plan for U.S. sugar farmers within the 2007 U.S. Farm Bill, Maloney hosted a fundraising event that netted $9,500 in contributions from sugar growers and refiners, according to Federal Election Commission records. Her election attorney, Andrew Tulloch, called the timing of the July 31 fundraiser "pure coincidence." The bill passed the House by a 282–144 vote. The Sunlight Foundation pointed out that among the 435 members of the House, Maloney has the ninth-highest amount of investment in oil stocks. She received a perfect 100 rating from the Defenders of Wildlife Action Fund in 2007, a perfect 100 rating from Environment America in 2008 and a perfect 100 from the League of Conservation Voters in 2008. And in 2008, Maloney introduced the Minerals Management Service Improvement Act (HR 7211) as a House companion to Integrity in Offshore Energy Resources Act (S. 3543). The legislation would impose dramatically tougher ethics rules for the Minerals Management Service, which was at the center of a major corruption scandal stemming from its employees' relationships with oil company representatives.

==== Women's, children's and family issues ====
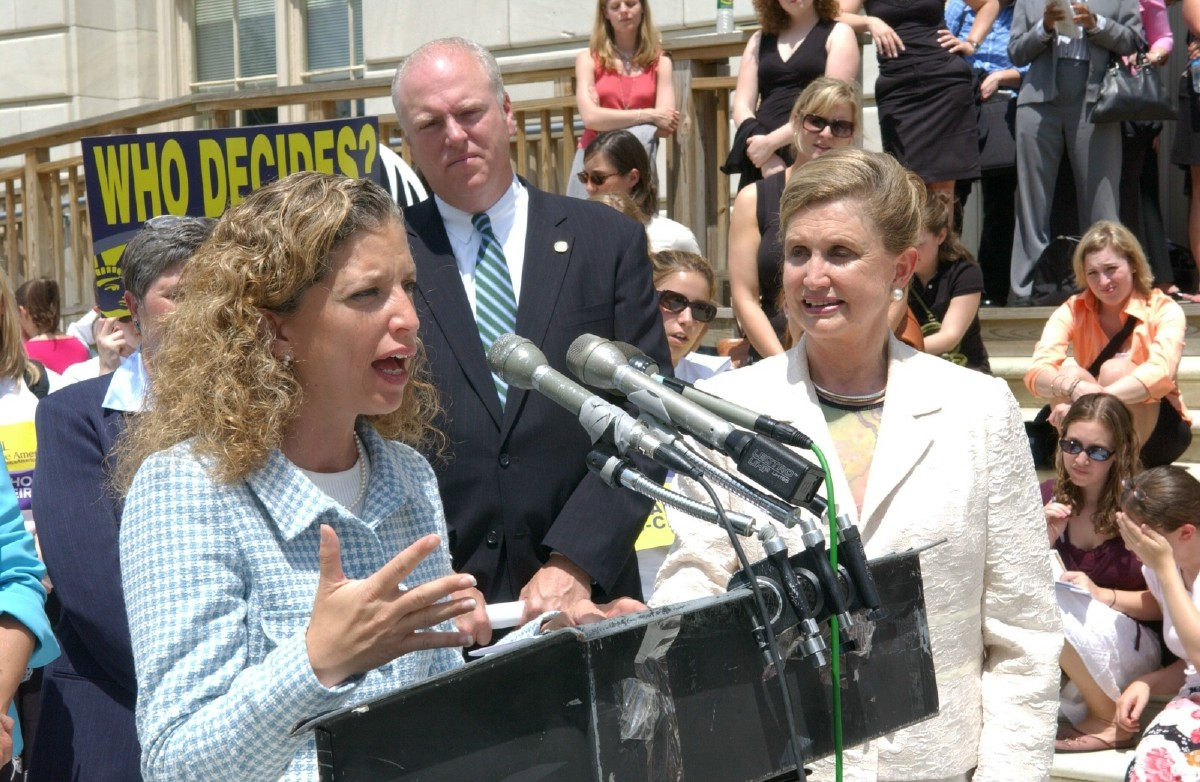
Maloney, Debbie Wasserman Schultz, and Joe Crowley speak out on the need to keep birth control safe and legal in 2005

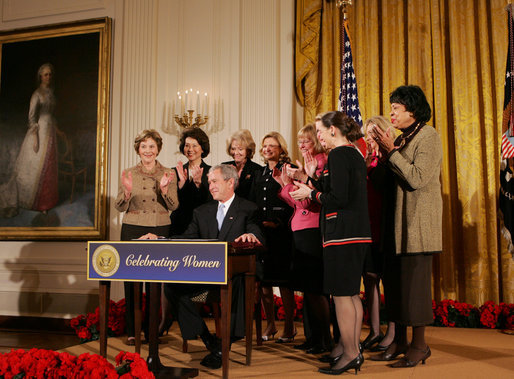
Maloney with President George W. Bush at the proclamation signing for Women's History Month in 2008

Maloney has been active on many other issues involving women, children and families since the beginning of her career. A former co-chair of the House Caucus on Women's Issues, she authored and helped secure the enactment into law of a measure to provide federal funding to clear the backlog of rape kits for which evidence had been collected, but never entered into law enforcement DNA databases. The Rape Abuse and Incest National Network called it "the most important anti-rape legislation ever considered by Congress". Maloney's bill, included in the Justice for All Act of 2005, was named the Debbie Smith Act in honor of Debbie Smith, a rape survivor. The effort to enact the bill was later the subject of a Lifetime Television movie, A Life Interrupted: The Debbie Smith Story, in which Maloney was played by Lynne Adams. Maloney also co-authored and helped secure passage of bipartisan legislation to curb the demand for sex trafficking.

Maloney introduced the Child Care Affordability Act of 2007 to increase access to child care by providing tax credits. Her amendment to a foreign aid bill succeeded in securing $60 million in funding for programs for Afghan women and girls and to help establish an Afghan commission on human rights. She is the chief House sponsor of the Equal Rights Amendment. In 2008 and again in 2009, Maloney authored, and secured House passage of, a bill to provide four weeks of paid parental leave to federal employees.

In 2011, Maloney sponsored the Campus Sexual Violence Elimination Act, known as the Campus SaVE Act. It became part of the reauthorization of the Violence Against Women Act of 2013. The measure guarantees counseling, legal assistance, and medical care on campuses for victims of sexual assault, establishes minimum, national standards for schools to follow in responding to allegations of sexual assault and sexual violence, and makes explicit that schools must provide to both the alleged perpetrator and the alleged victim the same rights, including access to advisers, written notifications, as well as appeals processes during campus disciplinary proceedings.

Saying that "for too long, women's stories have been left out of the telling of our nation’s history", Maloney began work in the 1990s on establishing a Smithsonian American Women’s History Museum on the National Mall. After years of effort, her bill passed and was signed into law in 2020.

After Virginia became the 38th state to ratify the ERA, Maloney and Jackie Speier introduced a resolution to recognize that the ERA had met all legal requirements to be considered the 28th amendment to the Constitution. In March 2022, Maloney sent U.S. archivist David Ferriero a letter urging him to fulfill his statutory duty and publish the ERA.

Maloney is a member of the Junior League of New York, and was honored with the Mary Harriman Award in 2018.

Virginia Maloney and Carolyn Maloney appeared together on an episode of Inside City Hall on New York 1 News (NY1 News) in May 2026. During the interview, they verbally urged members of Congress to finally pass the Equal Rights Amendment.

==== District issues ====
Maloney has helped secure funding for major mass transit projects, resulting in the commitment of billions of federal dollars for New York State. She has been hailed as a champion of the Second Avenue Subway.

Maloney co-sponsored the 2009 reintroduction of the Fair Copyright in Research Works Act (H.R. 801, originally introduced as H.R. 6845 in 2008) and the Research Works Act (H.R. 3699) introduced in 2011. Both bills aim to reverse the NIH's Public Access Policy, which mandates open access to NIH-funded research. Some scientists criticized the Association of American Publishers-backed Research Works Act. In a New York Times op-ed, Michael Eisen said the bill would force the public to pay $15–$30 per paper to read the results of research they had already paid for as taxpayers. (Such results must now be published in Pubmed Central (PMC) after an embargo period of up to 12 months; this embargo period was imposed to minimize financial harm to publishers who were concerned that their readership would diminish if the results appeared concurrently in PMC, though authors of the paper are required to submit their papers to PMC as soon as their paper gets accepted for publication by a peer-review journal.) Some have suggested that Maloney supports the measure because she is the recipient of campaign contributions from Elsevier, the largest scholarly publishing company. On February 27, 2012, following a boycott of the organization, Maloney wrote to her constituents, "it is important to be mindful of the impact of various industries on job creation and retention. New York State is home to more than 300 publishers that employ more than 12,000 New Yorkers, many of whom live in or around New York City in my district. New York City scientific publishers represent a significant subset of the total, and more than 20 are located in Manhattan, publishing thousands of scientific journals and employing thousands of New Yorkers." Elsevier withdrew its support for the legislation.

In 2021, Maloney protested the expansion of the New York Blood Center, a nonprofit biomedical research facility, from a three-story-headquarters to a 16-story tower on Manhattan's Upper East Side.

=== Committee assignments ===
- Committee on Financial Services
  - Subcommittee on Investor Protection, Entrepreneurship and Capital Markets
  - Subcommittee on Housing, Community Development and Insurance
- Committee on Oversight and Reform (chair)
  - As chair of the full committee, Maloney may serve as an ex officio member of all subcommittees.
- Select Subcommittee on the Coronavirus Crisis
- Joint Economic Committee (Vice Chair)

=== Caucus memberships ===
- House 9/11 Commission Caucus
- House Caucus on Women's Issues
- United States Congressional International Conservation Caucus
- Congressional Arts Caucus
- Americans Abroad Caucus (founder and co-chair)
- Congressional Taiwan Caucus
- Congressional Progressive Caucus
- House Baltic Caucus
- Co-chair, Congressional Hellenic Caucus
- Afterschool Caucuses
- Congressional Asian Pacific American Caucus
- U.S.-Japan Caucus
- Medicare for All Caucus
- House Pro-Choice Caucus
- Congressional Skin Cancer Caucus (founder and co-chair)
- Congressional Freethought Caucus

=== Scores by interest groups ===
Maloney's ratings from various interest groups include the following:

- The American Association of University Women (AAUW) gives her a 100.
- NARAL Pro-Choice America gives her a 100.
- Drug Policy Action gives her an A for 2015/2016.
- Planned Parenthood gives her a 100.
- The Human Rights Campaign gives her a 100.
- The Alliance for Retired Americans gives her a 100.
- The League of Conservation Voters gives her a 96 for 2013 and 95 lifetime.
- The Children's Defense Fund gives her a 90 for 2011.
- The National Education Association gives her an A.
- The American Public Health Association gives her a 100.
- The American Federation of State, County and Municipal Employees (AFSCME) gives her a 100.
- The AFL–CIO gave her a 2019 core of 90%, and a lifetime score of 97%.
- The Humane Society gave her a 100+ rating in 2013, and a 100 in 2020.
- The Brady Campaign to Prevent Gun Violence gives her a 100.
- The NRA gives her an F.
- The Gun Owners of America gave her an F in 2010.

== Controversies ==
=== Wearing burqa on House floor ===
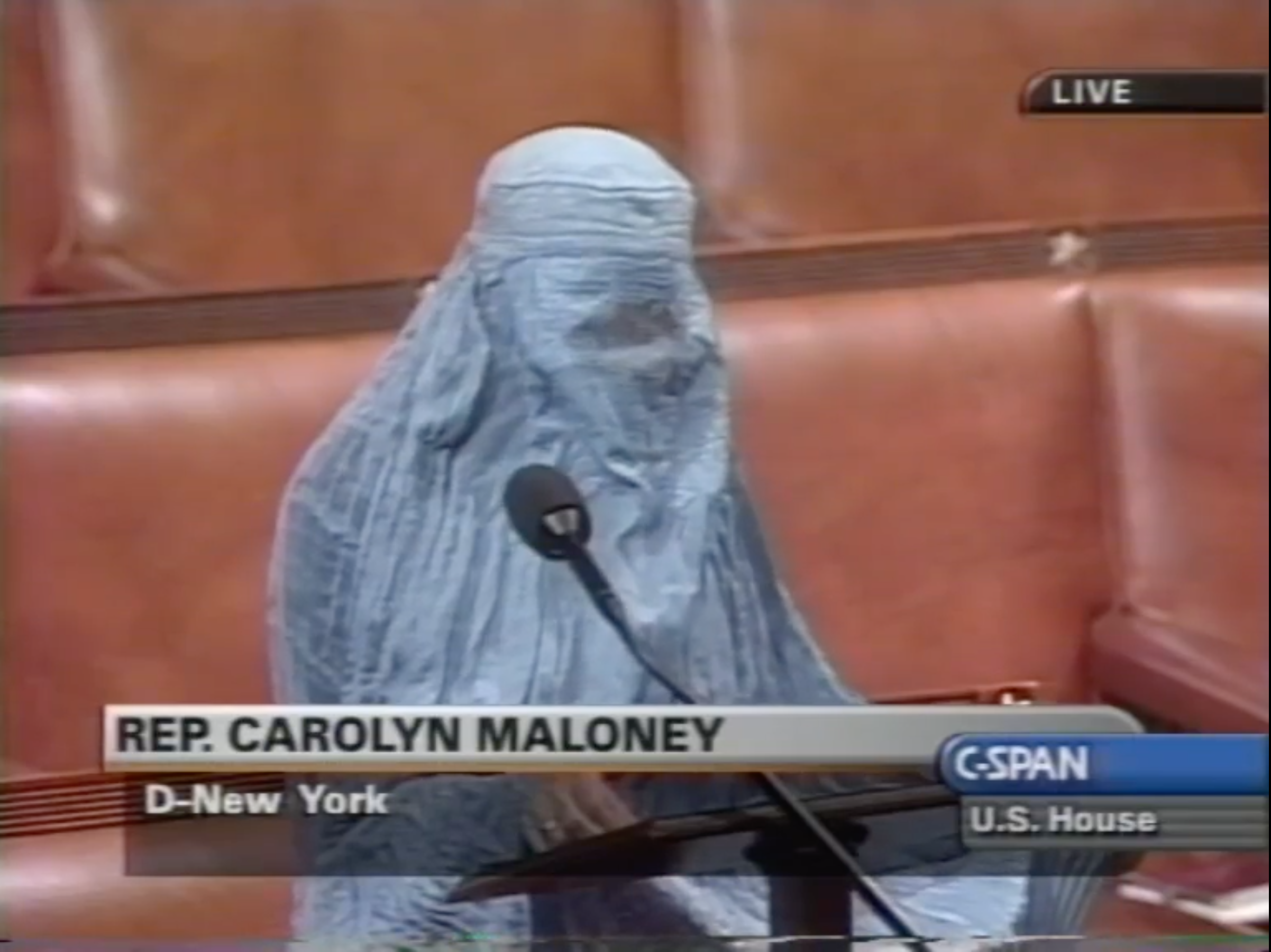
Carolyn Maloney gives a speech while donning an Afghan burqa on October 16, 2001

On October 16, 2001, Maloney wore an Afghan burqa while giving a speech in the United States House of Representatives in support of Afghan women's rights and American military involvement against the Taliban. It was the first time an Islamic veil had been worn on the House floor, and was technically not allowed under an unenforced 1837 hat ban.

In a 2018 Foreign Policy article, Rafia Zakaria, a Pakistani-American feminist author and journalist, called Maloney's display "theatrical" and an example of "American feminist exceptionalism, in which American women—intrepid and veil-free—are beacons of freedom with a duty to evangelize their particular brand of empowerment, even if it means using bombs." Muslim-American Rana Abdelhamid, while running in the Democratic primary against Maloney in 2021, criticized this event as feeding negative stereotypes about Muslims and of "weapon[izing my identity] to justify American wars". Maloney subsequently defended it as being necessary to make her point.

=== Use of the N-word ===
On July 20, 2009, Maloney apologized after saying the ethnic slur "nigger" while quoting a phone call she had received about U.S. Senator Kirsten Gillibrand in an interview with City Hall News. At the time, she was a week away from announcing an official campaign against Gillibrand in the 2010 United States Senate Democratic Primary election in New York. The quote, as reported by The Atlantic, was:

In fact, I got a call from someone from Puerto Rico, said [Gillibrand] went to Puerto Rico and came out for English-only [education]. And he said, 'It was like saying nigger to a Puerto Rican,'

Civil rights activist Al Sharpton criticized the remark and called Maloney's casual use of the word "alarming" but said he did not believe she was racist. She apologized and dropped out of the race on August 7, 2009, reportedly for different reasons.

=== 2022 primary ===
During the 2022 primary, Maloney campaigned on her work within the district, as well as her gender in the wake of Dobbs v. Jackson Women's Health Organization. Many of Maloney's activities were scrutinized, including her comments and legislation promoting the debunked theory that vaccines cause autism. During a debate with Nadler, Maloney attracted attention for saying that she believed President Joe Biden would not run for reelection in 2024. She also told The New York Times that she thought he should not run in 2024. Maloney later apologized and said that Biden should run again, though she maintained her belief that he would not.

=== Alleged Met Gala solicitation ===
In 2022, the House Ethics Committee was investigating Maloney for allegedly casting around for an invitation to the Met Gala. Investigators alleged Maloney had sought an invitation for herself after being cut from the invite list in 2016. Maloney called former president of the Met Emily Rafferty to request an invitation, according to testimony Rafferty gave investigators. Investigators also found that Maloney might have requested an invitation to the 2020 Met Gala, citing an email thread with a staffer in which she asked whether she was invited and how to contact the Met's government affairs staffer. In a February 2022 report, the Office of Congressional Ethics said it found "substantial reason to believe that Rep. Maloney may have solicited or accepted impermissible gifts associated with her attendance at the Met Gala."

== Electoral history ==
=== 1992 ===
New York's 14th congressional district general election, 1992
Party	Candidate	Votes	%
Democratic	Carolyn B. Maloney	94,613	51
Republican	Bill Green	89,423	49
Total votes		184,036	100.0
Democratic gain from Republican			

New York's 14th congressional district general election, 1994
Party	Candidate	Votes	%
Democratic	Carolyn B. Maloney	92,390	63
Republican	Charles Millard	52,754	36
Other	Thomas Leighton	1,310	1
Total votes		146,454	100.0
Democratic hold			

=== 1996 ===
New York's 14th congressional district general election, 1996
Party	Candidate	Votes	%
Democratic	Carolyn B. Maloney	112,026	72
Republican	Jeffrey E. Livingston	36,740	24
Right to Life	Delco L. Cornett	1,113	1
Conservative	Joseph A. Lavezzo	2,024	1
Independence	Thomas K. Leighton	3,073	2
Total votes		154,976	100.0
Democratic hold			

=== 1998 ===
New York's 14th congressional district general election, 1998
Party	Candidate	Votes	%
Democratic	Carolyn B. Maloney	101,848	77
Republican	Stephanie E. Kuplerman	30,426	23
Total votes		132,274	100.0
Democratic hold			

=== 2000 ===
New York's 14th congressional district general election, 2000
Party	Candidate	Votes	%
Democratic	Carolyn B. Maloney	133,420	73
Republican	C. Adrienne Rhodes	41,603	23
Green	Sandra Stevens	5,163	3
Independence	Frederick D. Newman	2,157	1
Total votes		182,343	100.0
Democratic hold			

New York's 14th congressional district general election, 2002
Party	Candidate	Votes	%
Democratic	Carolyn B. Maloney	83,509	75
Republican	Anton Srdanovic	27,614	25
Total votes		111,123	100.0
Democratic hold			

New York's 14th congressional district general election, 2004
Party	Candidate	Votes	%
Democratic	Carolyn B. Maloney	140,551	76
Independence	Carolyn B. Maloney	3,651	2
Working Families	Carolyn B. Maloney	4,467	2
Total	Carolyn B. Maloney	148,669	80
Republican	Anton Srdanovic	35,774	19
Conservative	Anton Srdanovic	1,162	1
Total	Anton Srdanovic	36,936	20
Total votes		185,575	100.0
Democratic hold			

New York's 14th congressional district general election, 2006
Party	Candidate	Votes	%
Democratic	Carolyn B. Maloney	107,095	75.6
Independence	Carolyn B. Maloney	4,387	3.1
Working Families	Carolyn B. Maloney	8,100	5.7
Total	Carolyn B. Maloney	98,811	84.5
Republican	Danniel Maio	21,969	15.5
Total votes		141,571	100.0
Democratic hold			

New York's 14th congressional district general election, 2008
Party	Candidate	Votes	%
Democratic	Carolyn B. Maloney	176,378	76.9
Working Families	Carolyn B. Maloney	6,812	3.0
Total	Carolyn B. Maloney	183,190	79.9
Republican	Robert G. Heim	43,365	18.9
Libertarian	Isaiah Matos	2,659	1.2
Total votes		229,239	100.0
Democratic hold			

=== 2010 ===
New York's 14th congressional district general election, 2010
Party	Candidate	Votes	%
Democratic	Carolyn B. Maloney	98,953	69.2
Working Families	Carolyn B. Maloney	8,374	5.9
Total	Carolyn B. Maloney	107,327	75
Republican	David Ryan Brumberg	32,065	22.4
Independence	Dino L. Laverghetta	1,617	1.1
Conservative	Timothy J. Healy	1,891	1.3
Total votes		143,042	100.0
Democratic hold			

New York's 12th congressional district general election, 2012
Party	Candidate	Votes	%
Democratic	Carolyn B. Maloney	185,780	76.9
Working Families	Carolyn B. Maloney	8,614	3.6
Total	Carolyn B. Maloney	194,394	80.5
Republican	Christopher R. Wight	42,120	17.4
Independence	Christopher R. Wight	2,475	1.0
Conservative	Christopher R. Wight	2,257	0.9
Total	Christopher R. Wight	46,852	19.4
Total votes		241,464	100.0
Democratic hold			

New York's 12th congressional district general election, 2014
Party	Candidate	Votes	%
Democratic	Carolyn B. Maloney	78,440	69.1
Working Families	Carolyn B. Maloney	12,163	10.7
Total	Carolyn B. Maloney	90,603	79.8
Republican	Nicholas S. Di Iorio	19,564	17.2
Independence	Nicholas S. Di Iorio	1,326	1.2
Conservative	Nicholas S. Di Iorio	1,841	1.6
Total	Nicholas S. Di Iorio	22,731	20.03
Total votes		113,501	100.0
Democratic hold			

=== 2016 ===
New York's 12th congressional district primary election, 2016
Party	Candidate	Votes	%
Democratic	Carolyn B. Maloney	15,101	89.04
Democratic	Peter Lindner	1,654	9.75
Total votes		16,959	100.0

New York's 12th congressional district general election, 2016
Party	Candidate	Votes	%
Democratic	Carolyn B. Maloney	230,153	78.26
Working Families	Carolyn B. Maloney	14,205	10.7
Total	Carolyn B. Maloney	242,358	83.6
Republican	Robert Ardini	49,399	17.03
Total votes		294,071	100.0
Democratic hold			

=== 2018 ===
New York's 12th congressional district primary election, 2018
Party	Candidate	Votes	%
Democratic	Carolyn B. Maloney	26,742	59.4
Democratic	Suraj Patel	18,098	40.2
Total votes		45,033	100.0

sd

New York's 12th congressional district general election, 2018
Party	Candidate	Votes	%
Democratic	Carolyn B. Maloney	205,858	81.7
Working Families	Carolyn B. Maloney	10,972	4.4
Reform	Carolyn B. Maloney	600	0.2
Total	Carolyn B. Maloney	251,877	86.3
Republican	Eliot Rabin	30,446	12.1
Green	Scott Hutchins	3,728	1.5
Total votes		251,877	100.0
Democratic hold			

New York's 12th congressional district primary election, 2020
Party	Candidate	Votes	%
Democratic	Carolyn B. Maloney	40,362	42.7
Democratic	Suraj Patel	37,106	39.3
Democratic	Lauren Ashcraft	12,810	13.6
Democratic	Peter Harrison	4,001	4.2
Total votes		94,477	100.0

New York's 12th congressional district general election, 2020
Party	Candidate	Votes	%
Democratic	Carolyn B. Maloney	265,172	82.1
Republican	Carlos Santiago-Cano	49,157	15.2
Conservative	Carlos Santiago-Cano	3,904	1.2
Total	Carlos Santiago-Cano	53,061	16.43
Libertarian	Steve Kolln	4,015	1.2
Total votes		323,032	100.0
Democratic hold			

=== 2022 ===
New York's 12th congressional district primary election, 2022
Party	Candidate	Votes	%
Democratic	Jerrold Nadler	45,545	55.4
Democratic	Carolyn B. Maloney	20,038	24.4
Democratic	Suraj Patel	15,744	19.2
Democratic	Ashmi Sheth	832	1.0
Total votes		82,159	100.0

== Personal life ==
Maloney and her husband, Clifton Maloney, raised two daughters. Her husband died on a climbing expedition in 2009, after climbing the world's sixth-tallest peak, Cho Oyu in Tibet.

== See also ==
- Women in the United States House of Representatives

U.S. House of Representatives
Preceded by Susan Molinari	Member of the U.S. House of Representatives from New York's 14th congressional district 1993–2013	Succeeded by Joe Crowley
Preceded by Chuck Schumer	Chair of the Joint Economic Committee; 2009–2011	Succeeded by Bob Casey
Preceded by Nydia Velázquez	Member of the U.S. House of Representatives from New York's 12th congressional district 2013–2023	Succeeded by Jerry Nadler
Preceded by Elijah Cummings	Chair of the House Oversight Committee; 2019–2023	Succeeded by James Comer
U.S. order of precedence (ceremonial)
Preceded by José E. Serrano as Former U.S. Representative	Order of precedence of the United States as Former U.S. Representative	Succeeded by Jimmy Duncan as Former U.S. Representative
