= Clifton Maloney =

American businessman (1937–2009)

- Born: Clifton Harlan Wells Maloney; October 15, 1937; Philadelphia, Pennsylvania, U.S.
- Died: September 25, 2009 (aged 71); Cho Oyu, China
- Education: Princeton University; Harvard Business School
- Occupation: Investment company management
- Spouse: Carolyn Jane Bosher (m. 1976)
- Children: 2 daughters, including Virginia

Clifton Harlan Wells Maloney (October 15, 1937 – September 25, 2009) was an American businessman.

== Early life ==
Maloney graduated from Princeton University in 1960 and Harvard Business School in 1965. He was in the United States Navy from 1960 to 1963, where he served on destroyers in the Pacific and rose to the rank of lieutenant. He was also a serious athlete and adventurer and a member of the Explorers Club, the Alpine Club, and the New York Yacht Club. Maloney was a lifelong runner who went on to complete the New York City Marathon twenty times, and in 2008 finished the race as the fastest American in his age group.

== Career ==
Maloney founded the eponymous investment company C. H. W. Maloney & Co., Inc. in 1981, of which he was president. Prior to that, he was a vice president at Goldman Sachs in charge of investment banking.

He was a director of Chromium Industries, Inc. and the Wall Street Fund. He was active in civic and social service organizations in Manhattan, serving on the boards of directors of Civitas and the New York Foundation for Senior Citizens, and served as the treasurer for his wife's campaigns.

== Family ==
In 1976, Maloney married Carolyn Jane Bosher, who later was elected the United States representative for what is now New York's 12th congressional district in parts of Manhattan, Queens and Brooklyn. They had two daughters, Christina and Virginia.

== Mountain climbing and death ==
Maloney was an accomplished mountaineer who at the time of his death was believed to be the oldest American ever to summit an "Eight-thousander", one of the fourteen peaks in the world that are greater than 8,000 meters in altitude. He climbed five of the "Seven Summits", the tallest mountains on each of the seven continents, including Denali in Alaska, Kilimanjaro in Africa, the Vinson Massif in Antarctica, Aconcagua in the Andes, and Mount Elbrus in the Caucasus. On September 24, 2009, at the age of 71, Maloney summited the nearly 27,000-foot peak of Cho Oyu, the world's sixth-highest mountain, in Tibet. He reached the summit of the "Turquoise Goddess", as the mountain is known, with the help of a sherpa and a guide, Marty Schmidt. He then descended to Camp 2 at 23,000 feet. On the morning of September 25, 2009 he woke up and told a companion, "I'm the happiest man in the world. I've just summited a beautiful mountain." These were apparently his last words as he went back to sleep and never woke up.

On October 9, 2009, Maloney's funeral service was held at the Brick Presbyterian Church in Manhattan. Nearly 1,000 mourners, including former President Bill Clinton, New York State Governor David Paterson, and former Democratic Vice-Presidential nominee and Congresswoman Geraldine Ferraro, were in attendance at the service, which included a performance by singer-songwriter Carole King of "So Far Away".
