= Eva Moskowitz =

American politician & education leader (born 1964)

Member of the New York City Council from the 4th district
- In office January 1, 1999 – December 31, 2005
- Preceded by: Andrew Eristoff
- Succeeded by: Daniel Garodnick

Personal details
- Born: March 4, 1964 (age 62) New York City, U.S.
- Party: Democratic
- Spouse: Eric Grannis
- Children: 3
- Education: University of Pennsylvania (BA); Johns Hopkins University (MA, PhD)
- Known for: CEO of Success Academy Charter Schools

Eva Sarah Moskowitz (born March 4, 1964) is an American historian, politician, and charter school advocate who is the founder and CEO of the Success Academy Charter Schools. A member of the Democratic Party, Moskowitz served on the New York City Council, representing the 4th district on the eastside of midtown Manhattan and the Upper East Side, from 1999 to 2005. Moskowitz interviewed to be Donald Trump's Secretary of Education, but decided not to pursue the position.

Moskowitz has advocated for the promotion of charter schools as a key component of education reform in the United States. She claims that they are instrumental in closing the educational disparity between disadvantaged and elite students. As one of the most prominent leaders for education reform, Moskowitz has clashed with the City of New York and its former mayor Bill de Blasio.

== Early life and education ==
On March 4, 1964, Moskowitz was born in New York City to Martin, a mathematician, and Anita, an art historian who fled Europe during the Holocaust. She was raised near Columbia University on 118th Street and Morningside Drive in Morningside Heights, Manhattan.

Moskowitz graduated from the public magnet Stuyvesant High School in 1982, received a Bachelor of Arts with honors in history from the University of Pennsylvania, and a Ph.D. in American history from Johns Hopkins University with her 1991 dissertation, Naming the Problem: How Popular Culture and Experts Paved the Way For "Personal Politics".

== Career ==
She taught women's history at the University of Virginia as a visiting professor of communications and mass culture, at Vanderbilt University as an assistant professor of history, at City University of New York (College of Staten Island) as an assistant professor of history, and chaired the faculty seminar in American studies at Columbia University in 1996–1999, as well as teaching civics at the Prep for Prep school, where she was also the director of public affairs.

=== New York City politics ===
Moskowitz served on New York City Council as the member for the Upper East Side of Manhattan from 1999 until 2006. Between 2002 and 2004, Moskowitz wrote six laws, including laws on health care and campaign finance reform.

Moskowitz's tenure in City County was set against the backdrop of a call for a reform of the national education system, where she became known for scourging the public-education system in New York City.

When Moskowitz first returned to New York after a year in Vanderbilt, she volunteered in Gifford Miller's City Council campaign and served as his field director. When he became speaker in 2002, Miller made Moskowitz the chair of the city's Council Education Committee, where she served until 2005.

In the three years in the position of chair, Moskowitz held oversight hearings focused on New York City's public school system. While Moskowitz had the support of Joel Klein, who was Chancellor of the New York City Department of Education from 2002 to 2010, she developed a reputation for being "abrasive" even with those who admired and supported her.

During the hearings, Moskowitz found that New York City's public schools lacked teachers, supplies, and facilities to support art and music, that many schools lacked appropriate facilities for physical education, schools were being overcharged for supplies because they were required to use a city-mandated online purchasing system, science education had not been updated for a modern context, there were too few qualified science teachers and insufficient science facilities, that social studies and civics instruction was below par, that only 10 percent of black and Hispanic students were eligible for Regents diplomas, and that parents were being asked to donate basic supplies for basic hygiene, such as toilet paper and paper towels. In 2005, approximately 30 students appeared at a hearing to testify about school conditions including complaints about filthy bathrooms and broken toilets.

United Federation of Teachers (UFT) members were "enraged" by the 2003 City Council hearings on teachers' contracts, seniority rights, work rules, and on other education issues. When she ran for the Democratic party nomination to be the Manhattan Borough President to succeed C. Virginia Fields, under a campaign emphasizing education and transportation issues, she lost—partly because of the strong UFT opposition, who campaigned for Scott Stringer.

== Success Academy Charter Schools ==
The first Success Academy Charter School opened in 2006, with Moskowitz serving as Principal. There were 165 students. The school was co-located in a building in Harlem with two other zoned district public schools. According to the podcast StartUp, Moskowitz had succeeded in closing the achievement disparity between disadvantaged students and more elite public-school students in New York in standardized tests as required by the New York State Education Department for students in grades three and eight. With these unprecedented test scores, Moskowitz earned the support of the media, wealthy donors (including Wall Street hedge fund executives), and those with political power, such as New York's Governor, David Paterson, and Mayor Bloomberg, who said that the Harlem Success Academy was "the poster child for this country." President Barack Obama also recognized charter schools as being crucial in reforming the education system. In March 2010, The Economist said that Harlem was viewed as the home of the charter-school movement due to the success of Harlem Success Academy.

The day after her electoral defeat on September 15, 2005, Moskowitz met with Petry and Greenblatt who convinced her to lead their proposed charter school network. They became the Success Academy network's key funders that contributed to its growth starting with Harlem Success Academy. In 2008, three more schools opened.

By 2012, Success Academy Charter School Inc. had made over eight million dollars in savings and cash investments, and it had spent over one million dollars on outreach services. In the 2010 fiscal year, Success Charter Network has raised $4.8 million from private funding along public funds from three levels of government. By 2010, charter schools had become a "favorite cause" of many of the founders of New York hedge funds, such as Anchorage Capital Group, Greenlight Capital, and Pershing Square Capital Management with over $15 billion assets under management, who used their fortunes as members of Democrats for Education Reform, (DFER) to influence educational policy and push for education reform. These wealthy hedge fund executives provided a significant counterweight from the political sphere to the teachers in the educational sphere who opposed charter schools. Joe Williams, author of Cheating Our Kids: How Politics and Greed Ruin Education, was DFER's CEO.

In 2015, hedge fund manager John Paulson, a major Trump ally, donated $8.5 million to Success. By December 2017, Success Academy included 45 schools, with schools in every borough of New York except Staten Island, with 17,000 students. According to a 2017 article in New Yorker, it was Moskowitz' wish that she would be running 100 schools within a decade.

As of 2025, Success Academy operates 57 schools across four boroughs, serving 22,000 students.

=== Controversy ===
In an October 2015, PBS NewsHour feature, PBS special correspondent for education, John Merrow, reported on the high-profile network of charter schools in New York City. A representative of a Success Academy charter school that shares the same building with a zoned public school in Brooklyn, New York, said that they did use out-of-school suspension for kindergartners and first graders. In 2014, in one school alone, 44 out-of-school suspensions were issued to 203 kindergartners and first graders. A mother and her son, who was a student at the school, described the negative impact of these suspensions and how this led her to transfer her son to another school. In response to the criticism, Moskowitz wrote a detailed letter which included the young boy's school records—and his offenses. Moskowitz sent the letter to PBS, to education reporters, posted it on the Success website, and included it in her 2017 book. In 2019, the US Department of Education found that these disclosures violated the Family Educational Rights and Privacy Act (FERPA). Success Academy again violated a former student's privacy rights when school officials disclosed the details of her educational records to a reporter. In 2020, the New York State Education Department found the school had violated the New York State student privacy law.

In 2017, hedge fund manager and Success Academy network board chair Daniel Loeb compared Democratic State Senate leader Andrea Stewart-Cousins, a black woman, to a member of the Ku Klux Klan. Moskowitz retained Loeb as chairman after he deleted the post and apologized, stating that opponents of charter schools were using the incident as an opportunity to call out the entire charter system.

In Midtown Manhattan June 2018, students from Success Academy's new flagship high school took to the streets to protest Moskowitz's policies, including the "no excuses" disciplinary policies. In January 2018, Moskowitz—who was concerned the high school's principal and teachers were not being strict enough—took a measure of installing her desk in the school hallway to more closely monitor students. As the number of new rules and severity of the consequences increased, the students organized their first protest in the high school itself. These students and their parents had been attending protests against the Mayor of New York, organized by Moskowitz, for years. Moskowitz removed some rules and decreased the punishments. Gimlet described the final year of the first Success Academy's graduation class, as one that was tumultuous and chaotic. At the end of the school year, Moskowitz faced the ire of some parents during a school meeting. Some of them expressed feelings of guilt, worry, and alarm at what was happening to their teenagers. One raised concerns about the mean culture of the school, and another about the harsh manner in which teachers would talk to the students and the impact that this would have on them.

By 2019, according to The Washington Post, the Success Academy network of 47 schools serving 17,000 students, is the "highest-performing and most criticized educational institution in New York", and perhaps in the United States.

=== Charter school advocacy ===
In December 2014, Moskowitz said that public education in the U.S. is lacking in rigor. She said that children must be challenged, as well as engaged, in order for them to want to be at school.

In her May 15, 2015, acceptance speech of the Manhattan Institute's Alexander Hamilton Award, Moskowitz promoted "school choice" which was first proposed in 1955. (Note: The right to choose or school choice which was first proposed in 1955, by economist and Nobel laureate Milton Friedman in an article entitled "The Role of Government in Education". He promoted the use of free market principles to improve the United States public school system. Instead of assigning children a public school based on where their parents live—zoned public schools—, Friedman proposed that parents should be able to choose their children's publicly-funded schools—public or private, religious or non-religious.) Moskowitz praised the use of tax credits as a powerful tool that allows parents to "vote with their feet."

Moskowitz believes that many underestimate the aptitude of inner city, low-income students by claiming that they "cannot achieve at the highest levels."

Another approach that Moskowitz uses in Success Academy schools, is the implementation of the broken windows theory, popularized in the 1990s as a policing method by Rudy Giuliani and Bill Bratton. The theory has been criticized for over-criminalizing communities of color. In every Success school there is a special business operations manager (BOM) team of several full-time staff, who are responsible for non-instructional components, such as maintenance of the school and courtyard and ensuring that the school is bright, cheerful, and inviting.

Moskowitz said that there is a need for more charter schools with socio-economic and racial diversity considering that New York City schools are "shockingly segregated".

In an interview with MarketWatch, Moskowitz said that education was mostly a matter for the state and local governments, but that she would continue to form new conceptions of public education considering its importance as a civil rights issue.

By 2019, the charter school movement reached the statewide cap on new charters, and capacity was near its limit.

==== Conflict with New York City ====
Moskowitz has been in a battle with Mayor of New York City Bill de Blasio since they both served on the New York City Council. In 2018, the New York Daily News called it a "long-running war between Moskowitz and New York's charter-skeptic mayor. Under Mayor Michael Bloomberg, the number of charter schools in New York increased from 17 charter schools in 2002, to 183 in 2013.

In a November 28, 2011, interview with the New York Daily News Editorial Board, Moskowitz emphasized the need for great schools and that this would only occur with a reform-minded administration. By November 2011, Moskowitz was concerned about Bloomberg's potential replacement in the 2013 mayoral election. At that time, de Blasio was already dubbed as an obstructionist of the charter schools by the Daily News. Bloomberg had proven to be a strong effective advocate for charter schools in the City. By 2011, Moskowitz already had opened nine successful charter schools and had five more schools that she was preparing for opening. She told the Daily News that she was considering running for the office of mayor.

Moskowitz's opposition to de Blasio intensified as she advocated for an end to caps on charter schools in general, and for Success Academy in particular. During his mayoral campaign, de Blasio, in June 2013, said that he would end the policy of providing free rent for charter schools that shared buildings with district-zoned public schools run by the Department of Education. Charter schools, such as Success Academy, are co-housed with public schools and have access to utilities, janitorial services, and school-safety officials for free. De Blasio, said that he would end free rent for some co-located charter schools. Charter schools are funded by the public but are autonomously owned and operated. Charter schools can "add revenue from private sources, lengthen their academic day and year," and are in control of their own curriculum. De Blasio, who had served on City of New York's Council Education Committee with Moskowitz for four years, singled out Success Academy in his comments.

De Blasio is a strong supporter of teachers unions, whereas charter schools are under no obligation to hire or retain non-unionized teachers. By 2014, only about 12 percent of the charter schools were unionized.

De Blasio's stance against charter schools was just one aspect of what was described as a rebellion against corporate-friendly education policies in New York.

As New York Mayor, de Blasio announced in early 2014 that he was disapproving three of Success Academy's co-locations that had been approved under his predecessor, Bloomberg, due to concerns of placing young children in high schools or displacing special needs public school students. Some in the media called this de Blasio's war on charter schools and minority students. Moskowitz, who was called a fierce critic of de Blasio, closed all 22 Success Academy schools on March 4, 2014, and encouraged staff and students to participate in what would be one of the largest civic field trips, with thousands of students, parents, and teachers rallying in Albany. Moskowitz was criticized for seeking the support of hedge fund managers and other influential financial leaders on Wall Street in her fight against de Blasio. Moskowitz, along with the allied charter school PAC StudentsFirst, contributed over $4 million to New York State Senate Republican campaigns, helping them maintain control of the chamber, to foster legislation for further privatization.

Moskowitz founded and directs the Great Public Schools Political Action Committee (PAC) that supports charter schools, following an election in which a pro-Success Academy candidate lost. In the 2011–2012, the Great Public Schools (PAC) gave $50,000 to Andrew Cuomo 2014, Inc.

== Selected publications and films ==
In 1993, Moskowitz wrote, produced and directed the VHS-only Some Spirit in Me, which examined the feminist movement from non-prominent activists. In 1996 she published a Journal of Women's History article on the work of Betty Friedan. In 2001, Moskowitz released the book In Therapy We Trust. The book argued that the American emphasis on self-fulfillment damages civic engagement. In 2012, she co-authored Mission Possible: How the Secrets of the Success Academies Can Work in Any School with Arin Lavinia. In 2017, HarperCollins published her memoir, The Education of Eva Moskowitz. In 2023, she co-authored A+ Parenting: The Surprisingly Fun Guide to Raising Surprisingly Smart Kids.

In 2010, Moskowitz was featured in the documentaries The Lottery and Waiting for "Superman", which followed students applying to Success Academy as well as protests and legal disputes associated with charter schools.

== Personal life ==
She is married to Eric Grannis and has three children, all of whom attended Success Academy Harlem East.

== Notes ==
Civic offices
Preceded by Andrew Eristoff	Member of the New York City Council from the 4th district 1999–2005	Succeeded by Daniel Garodnick
