= Keith Powers (politician) =

American politician (born 1983)

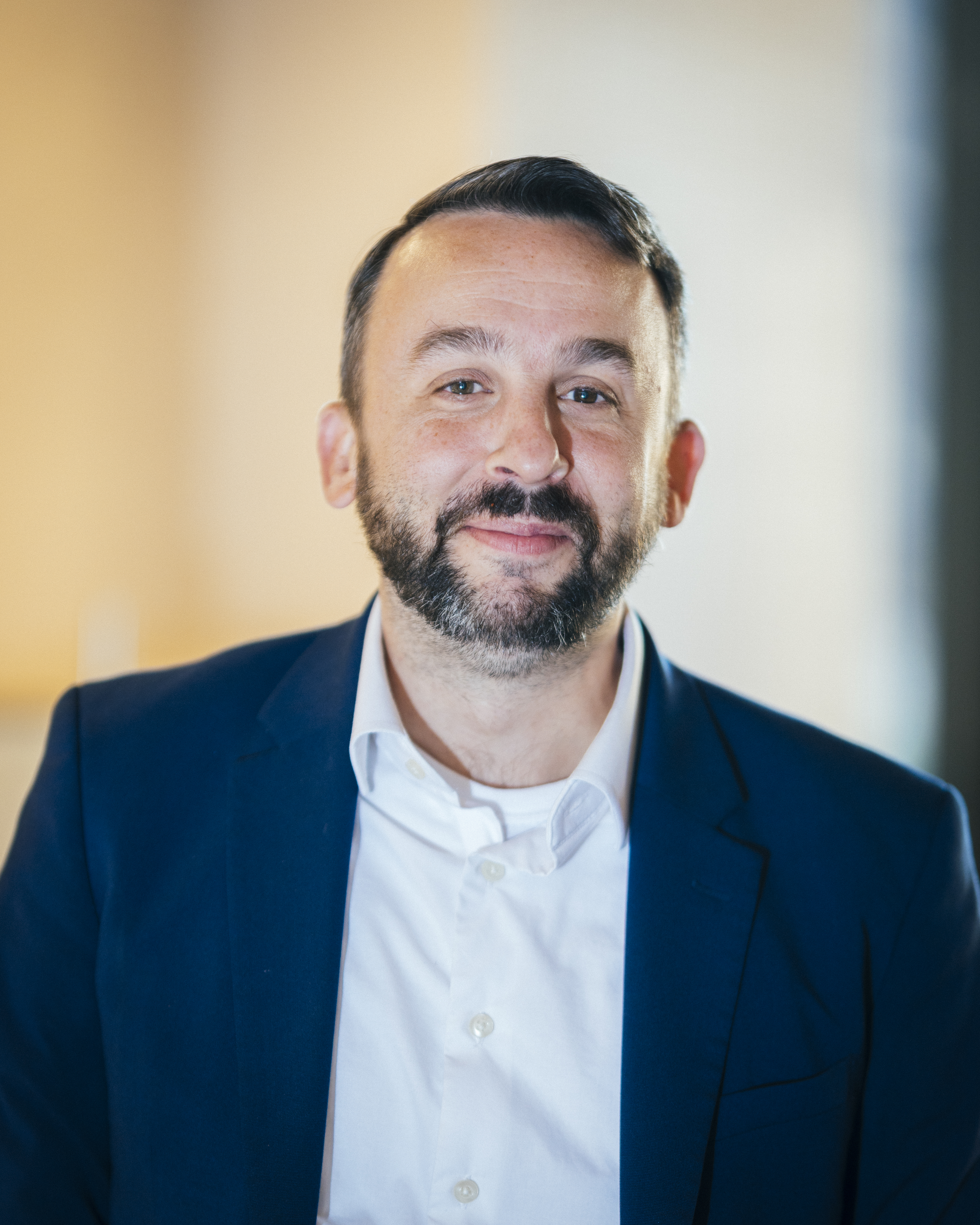

Member of the New York State Assembly from the 74th district
- Incumbent
- Assumed office February 4, 2026
- Preceded by: Harvey Epstein

Majority Leader of the New York City Council
- In office January 5, 2022 – January 3, 2024
- Preceded by: Laurie Cumbo
- Succeeded by: Amanda Farías

Member of the New York City Council from the 4th district
- In office January 1, 2018 – December 31, 2025
- Preceded by: Daniel Garodnick
- Succeeded by: Virginia Maloney

Personal details
- Born: November 16, 1983 (age 42) New York City, New York, U.S.
- Party: Democratic
- Education: University of Dayton (BA); City University of New York (MA)
- Website: Campaign website City Council website

Keith Powers (born November 16, 1983) is an American politician who is a member of the New York State Assembly for the 74th district. A member of the Democratic Party, he was a council member for the 4th district of the New York City Council from 2018 to 2025, and served as Majority Leader from 2022 to 2024.

The district includes the Upper East Side, Central Park South, Grand Central Terminal, Tudor City, Waterside, Peter Cooper Village, Carnegie Hill, Stuyvesant Town, the United Nations as well as part of Yorkville and Turtle Bay in Manhattan.

== Life and career ==
Powers attended The Epiphany School and St. Francis Preparatory School, both Catholic schools. He received his B.A. in political science from the University of Dayton in 2005 and his M.A. in political science from the City University of New York's Graduate Center in 2013.

From November 2006 to January 2011, Powers served as the chief of staff for New York State Assembly member Johnathan Bing. He was the campaign manager for New York State Senator Liz Krueger during her 2006 campaign. Since January 2011 Powers has served as the chair of the Business Affairs Committee of Community Board 6. From January 2011 to the start of his campaign in April 2017, he was the vice president of Constantinople & Vallone Consulting, a government relations consulting firm. Notable clients of Powers included private prison contractor Geo Group, the Patrolmen's Benevolent Association, and the Sports and Arts in School Foundation.

On September 12, 2017, he won the Democratic nomination for New York City Council District 4. He won the November 7 general election and took the place of Councilman Dan Garodnick on January 1, 2018.

In January 2019, he was ranked first (tied with Helen Rosenthal) as top lawmaker on New York City Council by City and State.

In 2023, Powers withdrew from the NYC Progressive Caucus of the New York City Council.

=== 2025 Manhattan Borough President Race ===
Following the decision by New York City Manhattan Borough President Mark Levine to open a campaign account for city comptroller, Powers announced that he would run to succeed Levine in the 2025 Manhattan Borough President Election and Democratic primary.On June 24, 2025, New York State Senator Brad Hoylman-Sigal defeated Keith Powers in the Democratic Party primary for Manhattan Borough President.

=== 2026 Special election for New York State Assembly District 74 ===
Following the resignation of Harvey Epstein to take a seat in the NY City Council, Powers was selected by a special section of the Manhattan Democratic committee to replace him on December 10, 2025.

The election took place on February 3, 2026.

== Electoral history ==
=== 2026 special ===
2026 New York State Assembly special election, District 74
Party	Candidate	Votes	%
Democratic	Keith Powers	4,203	82.5
Republican	Joseph Foley	719	
Conservative	Joseph Foley	120	
Total	Joseph Foley	839	16.5
Write-in		50	1.0
Total votes		5,092	100.0
Democratic hold			

Powers won the Democratic primary for District 4 in 2017 with 40.83% of the vote. He went on to win the general election with 57.44% of the vote, against Republican Party candidate Rebecca Harary and Liberal Party candidate Rachel Honig.

New York City Council: District 4
Election	Candidate	Party	Votes	Pct	Candidate	Party	Votes	Pct	Candidate	Party	Votes	Pct	Candidate	Party	Votes	Pct
2017 Primary	Keith Powers	Dem	4,456	40.83%	Marti Speranza	Dem	2,493	22.84%	Rachel Honig	Dem	948	8.69%	Bessie Schachter	Dem	918	8.41%
2017 General	Keith Powers	Dem	15,086	57.44%	Rebecca Harary	Rep	8,015	30.52%	Rachel Honig	Lib	3,137	11.94%				

Political offices
Preceded by Laurie Cumbo	Majority Leader of the New York City Council; 2022–2024	Succeeded by Amanda Farías
