= Calvin Sun =

Asian American physician

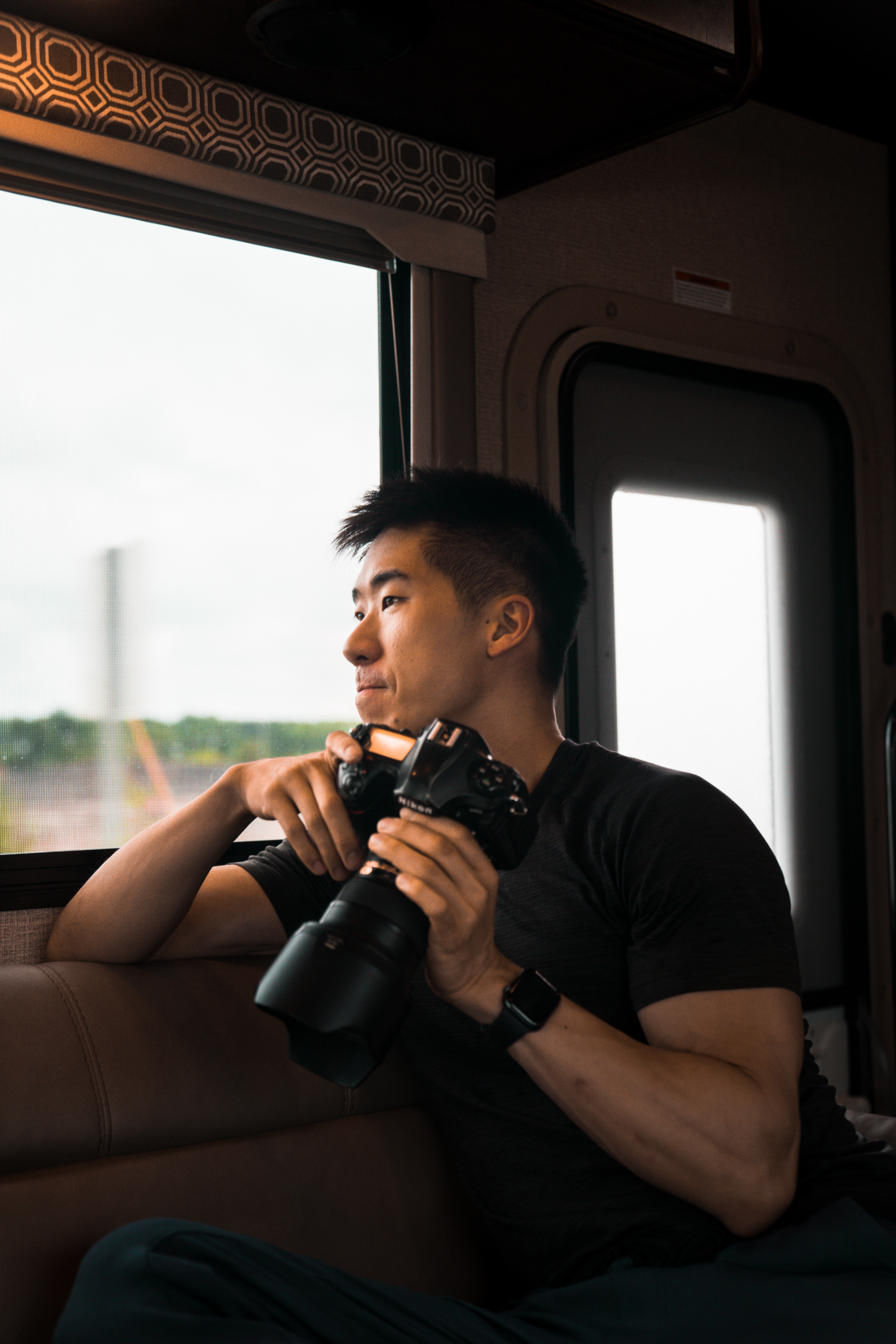
- Calvin Sun in 2020
- Born: Calvin Datze Sun; November 20, 1986 (age 39); New York City
- Education: Columbia University
- Occupation: Emergency Physician
- Website: calvindsun.com

Calvin Datze Sun (born November 20, 1986) is an American physician. Sun is notable for his first-person accounts of the COVID-19 pandemic in New York City emergency rooms and creating the travel blog, The Monsoon Diaries.

== Early life and education ==
Sun was born in New York City. His parents came from China, but met in New York City. His father was originally from the Hunan region of China. In 2006, Sun's father died from a heart attack. Sun's mother has Parkinson's disease.

In 2008, Sun graduated with a B.A. in biochemistry from Columbia University. During his sophomore year at Columbia, Sun was a research assistant to molecular biologist Dr. Richard Axel at the Columbia University Medical Center. In 2014, Sun received an M.D. from SUNY Downstate College of Medicine and completed four years of residency at the Emergency Medicine Residency Program at Albert Einstein College of Medicine.

== Career ==
=== COVID-19 ===
Sun works at an urgent care in New York City. During the COVID-19 pandemic, Sun was working per diem as an emergency physician, rotating among different hospitals in New York City during the early days of the pandemic. Sun gave first person accounts of his experiences and thoughts on the disease via his Instagram. He also gave many interviews to media outlets in the United States and abroad, and with interviewers like Katy Tur from MSNBC, Willie Geist from The TODAY Show.

In his interview with Katie Couric, he likened working on the front-lines of the pandemic to being like going to war every day. Sun discussed his initial concerns with national shortages of ventilators and personal protective equipment (PPE), issues with cross-contamination in crowded ER rooms, the importance of testing and staying home in the interest of public safety. Both of Sun's grandparents contracted COVID-19 and his grandfather died of the disease.

=== The Monsoon Diaries ===
In 2010 while beginning medical school, Sun began to document his international travels in an online photo blog called The Monsoon Diaries.

Around Winter 2012, Sun turned his blog into a travel community so that participants can travel in spontaneously formed groups on budget-conscious trips while still being able to work or go to school full-time.

=== Filmmaking ===
In July 2007, Sun's short film, Asian American Beauty: A Discourse on Female Body Image, won the One to Watch Award at the 30th Asian American International Film Festival in New York City.

== Book ==
2022: The Monsoon Diaries: A Doctor's Journey of Hope and Healing from the ER Frontlines to the Far Reaches of the World, Harper Horizon, Sep 27, 2022 - Biography & Autobiography - 224 pages
