= New York City's 4th City Council district =

- Boundaries following the 2020 census

Government
  - Councilmember: Virginia Maloney (D—Lenox Hill)

Population (2020)
  - Total: 177,118

Demographics
  - White: 78%
  - Asian: 11%
  - Hispanic: 7%
  - Black: 3%
  - Other: 2%

Registration
  - Democratic: 59.6%
  - Republican: 13.6%
  - No party preference: 24.5%
- Registered voters (2025) 113,632

New York City's 4th City Council district is one of 51 districts in the New York City Council. It has been represented by Democrat Virginia Maloney since 2026, succeeding fellow Democrat and former Majority Leader Keith Powers.

== Geography ==
District 4 covers a large swath of Manhattan's Upper East Side, also stretching south to include some or all of Midtown, Times Square, Stuyvesant Town–Peter Cooper Village, Turtle Bay, Murray Hill, and Koreatown. The UN Headquarters, Rockefeller Center, and many other central Manhattan landmarks are located in the district.

The district overlaps with Manhattan Community Boards 5, 6, and 8, and is contained entirely within New York's 12th congressional district. It also overlaps with the 28th and 59th districts of the New York State Senate, and with the 73rd, 74th, and 75th districts of the New York State Assembly.

== Recent election results ==
=== 2025 ===
The 2025 New York City Council elections will be held on November 4, 2025, with primary elections occurring on June 24, 2025.

2025 New York City Council election, District 4 Democratic primary
Party	Candidate	Maximum round	Maximum votes	Share in maximum round	Maximum votes First round votes Transfer votes
Democratic	Virginia Maloney	5	13,053	53.1%	
Democratic	Vanessa Aronson	5	11,517	46.9%	
Democratic	Rachel Storch	4	8,258	30.1%	
Democratic	Benjamin Wetzler	3	4,399	16.5%	
Democratic	Faith Bondy	2	2,325	7.9%	
Democratic	Lukas Florczak	2	505	1.7%	
Write-in		1	170	0.6%	

2025 New York City Council election, District 4 general election
Party	Candidate	Votes	%
Democratic	Virginia Maloney	43,247	68.9
Republican	Debra Schwartzben	18,868	26.9
Revive East Side	Kyle Athayde	2,573	4.1
Write-in		125	0.1
Total votes		62,813	100.0
Democratic hold			

=== 2023 (redistricting) ===
Due to redistricting and the 2020 changes to the New York City Charter, councilmembers elected during the 2021 and 2023 City Council elections will serve two-year terms, with full four-year terms resuming after the 2025 New York City Council elections.

2023 New York City Council election, District 4
Party	Candidate	Votes	%
Democratic	Keith Powers (incumbent)	13,159	73.4
Republican	Brian Robinson	4,534	
Parent Party	Brian Robinson	149	
Total	Brian Robinson	4,683	26.1
Write-in		74	0.5
Total votes		17,916	100.0
Democratic hold			

=== 2021 ===
An interactive map of District 4

In 2019, voters in New York City approved Ballot Question 1, which implemented ranked-choice voting in all local elections. Under the new system, voters have the option to rank up to five candidates for every local office. Voters whose first-choice candidates fare poorly will have their votes redistributed to other candidates in their ranking until one candidate surpasses the 50 percent threshold. If one candidate surpasses 50 percent in first-choice votes, then ranked-choice tabulations will not occur.

2021 New York City Council election, District 4
Party	Candidate	Votes	%
Democratic	Keith Powers (incumbent)	23,153	75.0
Republican	David Casavis	7,174	
Libertarian	David Casavis	495	
Total	David Casavis	7,669	24.8
Write-in		47	0.2
Total votes		30,869	100
Democratic hold			

=== 2017 ===
2017 New York City Council election, District 4
Primary election
Party	Candidate	Votes	%
Democratic	Keith Powers	4,456	40.8
Democratic	Marti Speranza	2,493	22.8
Democratic	Rachel Honig	948	8.7
Democratic	Bessie Schachter	918	8.4
Democratic	Vanessa Aronson	746	6.8
Democratic	Maria Castro	503	4.6
Democratic	Jeffrey Mailman	482	4.4
Democratic	Barry Shapiro	232	2.1
Democratic	Alec Hartman	109	1.0
Write-in		25	0.2
Total votes		10,912	100
General election
Democratic	Keith Powers	16,496	57.2
Republican	Rebecca Harary	8,119	
Stop De Blasio	Rebecca Harary	451	
Women's Equality	Rebecca Harary	239	
Reform	Rebecca Harary	82	
Total	Rebecca Harary	8,891	30.8
Liberal	Rachel Honig	3,422	11.9
Write-in		28	0.1
Total votes		28,837	100
Democratic hold			

=== 2013 ===
2013 New York City Council election, District 4
Party	Candidate	Votes	%
Democratic	Daniel Garodnick	20,401	
Working Families	Daniel Garodnick	965	
Total	Daniel Garodnick (incumbent)	21,366	70.5
Republican	Helene Jnane	8,620	
Libertarian	Helene Jnane	291	
Total	Helene Jnane	8,911	29.4
Write-in		27	0.1
Total votes		30,304	100
Democratic hold			

== Previous councilmembers ==
- Murray W. Stand (1920s–1930s)
- Aloysius Maickel (1949–1953)
- Robert Barnes (1953–1965)
- Robert Low (1965–1969)
- Carter Burden (1969 – 1974)
- Theodore S. Weiss (1974–1976)
- Henry T. Berger (1977–1978)
- Ruth Messinger (1978–1989)
- Ronnie Eldridge (1989–1991)
- Carolyn B. Maloney (1992)
- Andrew Sidamon–Eristoff (1993–1999)
- Eva Moskowitz (1999–2005)
- Daniel Garodnick (2005–2017)
- Keith Powers (2018–2025)
