= Rachel Storch =

American politician

Member of the Missouri House of Representatives
- In office January 5, 2005 – January 5, 2011
- Preceded by: Bob Hilgemann
- Succeeded by: Susan Carlson

Personal details
- Born: September 5, 1972 (age 54) New York City, New York
- Party: Democratic
- Spouse: Barry Akrongold (m. 2010)
- Children: 4
- Education: Harvard University (BA); Washington University School of Law (JD)

Rachel Storch (born September 5, 1972) is an American politician who served in the Missouri House of Representatives from the 64th district from 2005 to 2011. She is Chief Operating Officer of the Fifth Avenue Synagogue and was an unsuccessful candidate in the 2025 New York City Council election for the Democratic nomination from the 4th district.

== Early life and education ==
Storch was born in Manhattan, New York City, and her family moved to St. Louis, Missouri, when she was two years old. Her father, Gregory A. Storch, is currently a professor at the Washington University School of Medicine and previously was the director of the Division of Pediatric Infectious Diseases at St. Louis Children's Hospital. She grew up in University City and attended John Burroughs School.

She graduated from Harvard University with a Bachelor of Arts and the Washington University School of Law with a Juris Doctor in 1997.

== Career ==
Storch worked as a lawyer at the Legal Services of Eastern Missouri, then worked on the 2000 U.S. Senate campaign of Mel Carnahan. After his death in a plane crash, Storch worked for two years as deputy chief of staff for his widow, U.S. Senator Jean Carnahan.

She went on to work as a legal counsel in the Missouri Senate, and as state director for Hillary Clinton's 2008 primary campaign.

Storch is the Chief Operating Officer of the Fifth Avenue Synagogue, an Orthodox synagogue on the Upper East Side of Manhattan.

=== Missouri House of Representatives ===
She was first elected to the Missouri House of Representatives in 2004, then re-elected twice, representing the 64th district, which included the neighborhoods of St. Louis south of Forest Park, including Dogtown.

In 2009, the Aspen Institute announced Storch would be part of the 5th annual class of the Rodel Fellowship in Public Leadership.

=== 2025 New York City Council campaign ===
In 2024, Storch announced her campaign for the 2025 New York City Council election in the 4th district, where incumbent Democrat Keith Powers is term-limited. Storch highlighted combatting antisemitism and combatting anti-Israel demonstrations at Columbia University as inspiring her to run for office.

Storch and fellow candidate Faith Bondy announced they would cross-endorse each other, encouraging their supporters to rank each other. She raised $454,000, nearly half the total raised in the race, after opting out of the New York City Campaign Finance Board's public matching funds program which imposes spending limits on candidates. She earned a first-choice endorsement from The Jewish Voice, benefited from spending from the New York Apartment Association, and— alongside Bondy and Maloney— garnered support from businessmen and megadonors Bill Ackman and Steven Roth.

Storch placed third behind Virginia Maloney and Vanessa Aronson in the initial first-round results of the June 24 primary in a tight race with 22.81% of the vote. She was eliminated in the fifth round of ranked choice tabulation on July 1st.

== Personal life ==
Storch married Barry Akrongold, a real estate investor, in 2010; the couple moved to New York City soon after and have four children. She is Jewish.
