= The Jewish Voice =

Weekly conservative newspaper based in Brooklyn, New York

- Type: Weekly newspaper
- Publisher: David Ben Hooren
- News editor: Fern Sidman
- Launched: 2003; 23 years ago
- Language: English
- Headquarters: 641 Lexington Avenue, New York
- Website: tjvnews.com/

The Jewish Voice (TJV) is a conservative weekly newspaper based in Manhattan, New York, that was founded in 2003 as The Jewish Sephardic Voice. The Jewish Voice has a pro-Israel editorial outlook. It covers Israeli and American news (the latter focused on New York and, to a lesser extent, New Jersey and Florida). The paper describes its mission as "providing our readers with timely and thought-provoking news and opinion, from a pro-American, pro-Israel perspective". By 2025 The Jewish Voice became a multi media company, besides the weekly newspaper and sixteen platforms online (Twitter, Facebook, Instagram, LinkedIn, Telegram, WhatsApp, and more).

== Staff, writers, and focus ==
The Jewish Voice's founder and publisher is David Ben Hooren. He is a Syrian Jew and a member of the New York Syrian Sephardic Jewish community. OP-ed contributors include such conservative voices as Jerusalem Post columnist and editor Caroline Glick, former UN Ambassador John Bolton, and British journalist Melanie Phillips, among others. According to Right Wing Watch, after far-right activist Laura Loomer was banned from Twitter for posting racist and Islamophobic content, she reportedly evaded her block by using The Jewish Voice's Twitter account.

In March 2020, the paper reported 100 positive COVID-19 tests in Hasidic communities located in Borough Park and Williamsburg. The paper urged compliance with mask-wearing, social distancing, and other health guidelines during COVID-19 pandemic in New York City. Hooren reported that many Orthodox Jews felt "singled out" and targeted with the enforcement of the restrictions.

The Jewish Voice primarily focuses on New York City news, society, and culture, as well as Israeli news. The newspaper played an instrumental role in the election of Republican Bob Turner for United States Representative for New York's 9th congressional district in 2011. They also endorsed David Storobin, Marty Golden, and Eric Ulrich for New York State Senate in 2012. The paper endorsed Mitt Romney in the 2012 Presidential election, and Donald Trump in the 2016, 2020 and 2024 presidential elections.
