= Carmen E. Arroyo =

Puerto Rican politician

Member of the New York State Assembly from the 84th district
- In office February 28, 1994 – December 31, 2020
- Preceded by: David Rosado
- Succeeded by: Amanda Septimo

Personal details
- Born: June 2, 1933 (age 93) Corozal, Puerto Rico
- Party: Democratic
- Education: City University of New York; College of New Rochelle

Carmen E. Arroyo (born June 2, 1933) is an American politician and a native of Puerto Rico who is the first Hispanic woman elected to the New York State Assembly. She served the 84th Assembly District, which covers the Mott Haven, Port Morris, Melrose, The Hub, Longwood, Concourse, and Hunts Point sections of the South Bronx.

== Early years ==
Arroyo was born and raised in the town of in Corozal, Puerto Rico where she received both her primary and secondary education. She graduated from Corozal High School and then attended the Sixto Febus Business School where she took Secretarial and Bookkeeping courses and earned a diploma. She married Pablo Arroyo and together they had seven children; she was eventually abandoned by her husband and she then decided to move to the United States.

In 1964, Arroyo moved to New York City with her children and settled down in the borough of the Bronx. While the idea of the move to the United States was a search for a better way of life she was soon faced with racial discrimination and other hardships. Arroyo became dependent on the welfare and public assistance systems of the state.

Arroyo took classes in English and attended Eugenio María de Hostos Community College, of the City University of New York (CUNY) where in 1978 she earned her Associate of Arts degree. Arroyo studied at night and worked during the day while she attended the College of New Rochelle. She earned her Bachelor of Arts degree from said educational institution in 1980.

== First female Puerto Rican housing developer ==
Arroyo organized a group of welfare mothers and formed the South Bronx Action Group in 1966. She became the group's executive director and with the federal funds which the group received she was able to provide the community with services in employment, health and adult education. In 1978 Arroyo became the Executive Director of the South Bronx Community Corporation where she worked to develop private homes in the South Bronx that were sold to families and residents of the South Bronx Community. She was also instrumental in the construction of 194 housing units for senior citizens becoming the first Puerto Rican woman housing developer in New York State.

== New York State Assembly ==
In a special election held in February, 1994, Arroyo ran and was elected to the New York State Assembly, representing the 84th District which includes the Bronx and thus became the first Puerto Rican woman elected to the Assembly and the first Puerto Rican woman elected to any state assembly in the United States. Among the committees which she has been assigned to are those on:

- Alcoholism and Drug Abuse;
- Children and Families; and
- Education and Aging committees.

Arroyo has also been involved with:

- The Assembly/Senate Puerto Rican/Hispanic Task Force,
- The Black and Puerto Rican Caucus,
- The Women's Caucus,
- The National Order of Women Legislators, and
- The New York City Commission on the Status of Women

Arroyo's daughter, Maria del Carmen Arroyo has followed in her mother's footsteps and ran for a seat in New Yorks City Council and was sworn in on March 21, 2005, representing District 17 of the Bronx. On April 23, 2004, New York State Governor George E. Pataki presented Arroyo with the Champions of Housing Award in a reception held in Albany, New York.

NY State Assemblywoman Carmen Arroyo has been sued by the state Board of Elections 21 times since 2006-for a total of $12,700- for failing to file campaign finance disclosures. The nondisclosure is a violation of state election laws that often results in heavy fines, but little else. Arroyo has an established record of ignoring the deadlines.

Board of Elections Officer Risa Sugarman referred Arroyo to the state attorney general in 2015 due to numerous financial irregularities. Including a number of 'loans' allegedly made in 2014" by the campaign committee to Arroyo. At least one of the loans appeared to have been paid directly to Empire City Casino in Yonkers, Sugarman wrote.

In total, $3,322 in campaign funds were either withdrawn from an ATM located at the casino or used to make at least one direct purchase at the facility, Sugarman found.

According to a footnote in the letter, a January 2015 bank statement from Chase indicates that a "loan" of $518 made on Jan. 2 of that year was a "card purchase" made to Empire City Casino.

In addition in 2013, it was found that individuals who worked on Arroyo's daughters campaign in 2013 had forged petition signatures for ballot access in her reelection to council. She also came under fire for paying her son over $55,000 from her campaign account for a part-time advisory role.

== Currently ==
Carmen Arroyo currently continues to hold her political position and has published her autobiography titled "Carmen Arroyo: Puertorriqueña en Nueva York, mujer de armas tomadas" (Carmen Arroyo: Puerto Rican Female in New York). She also published a book of poems titled "Mis Poemas" (My Poems). Assemblywoman Arroyo currently serves as Chair of the Sub-Committee on the Effective Treatment of Alcoholism and Drug Addiction, Chair of the Sub-Committee on Bilingual Education, Chair of the Assembly Office of State and Federal Affairs, and Chair of the Assembly and Senate Puerto Rican/Hispanic Task Force.

== See also ==
- List of Puerto Ricans
- History of women in Puerto Rico

New York State Assembly
Preceded by David Rosado	New York State Assembly, 74th District; 1994–2002	Succeeded by Steven Sanders
Preceded by J. Gary Pretlow	New York State Assembly, 84th District; 2003–2020	Succeeded by Amanda Septimo
