= José M. Serrano =

American politician (born 1972)

José Serrano
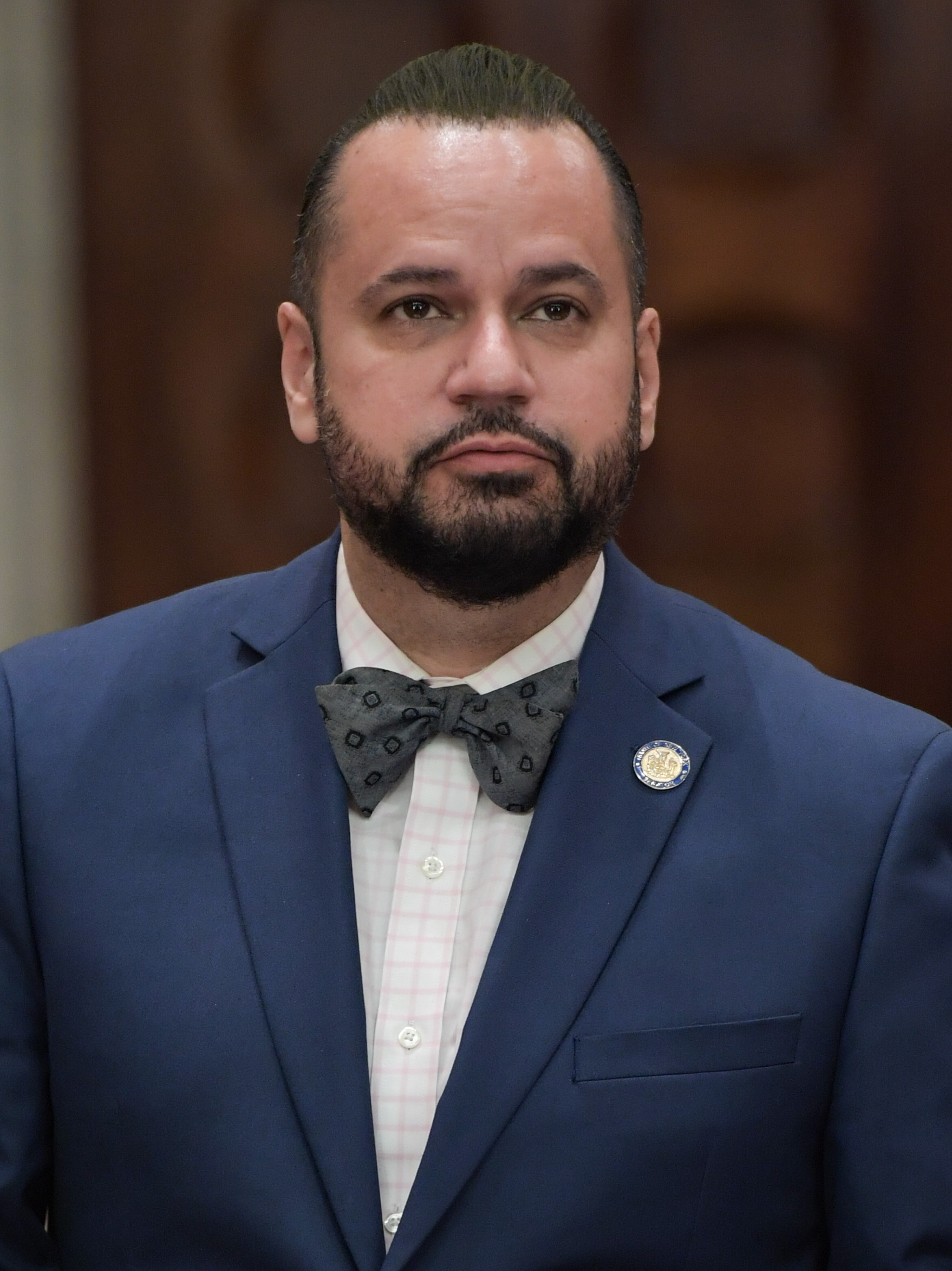

Member of the New York Senate from the 29th district
- Incumbent
- Assumed office January 1, 2005
- Preceded by: Olga A. Mendez
- Constituency: 28th district (2005–2012); 29th district (2013–present)

Member of the New York City Council from the 17th district
- In office January 1, 2002 – January 1, 2005
- Preceded by: Pedro Espada
- Succeeded by: Maria del Carmen Arroyo

Personal details
- Born: José Marco Serrano; June 19, 1972 (age 54) New York City, New York, U.S.
- Party: Democratic
- Children: 2
- Relatives: José E. Serrano (father)
- Education: Manhattan University (BA)
- Website: State Senate website

José Marco Serrano (born June 19, 1972) is a member of the New York State Senate from the 29th District, representing Mott Haven, Melrose, Highbridge, Morris Heights, Spanish Harlem, Yorkville, Roosevelt Island and part of the Upper West Side. He is the son of former U.S. Congressman José Serrano.

A lifelong South Bronx resident, Serrano was elected to the New York State Senate in November 2004. He defeated Republican Olga Mendez, a 26-year incumbent in the district. Since 2019, he has served as the Chair of the Majority Conference, the third highest-ranking member of the Senate.

He was the subject of Congressional campaign speculation when his father announced his retirement from representing NY-15, but chose not to run.

== Background ==
Serrano was born and raised in the South Bronx, where his father, José E. Serrano, was a member of the New York State Assembly, and later a member of the United States House of Representatives. Serrano is a graduate of Manhattan College.

Prior to becoming involved in politics, Serrano worked with the New York Shakespeare Festival.

In 2001, Serrano was elected to the 17th district of the New York City Council, representing Melrose, Mott Haven, Longwood, and Hunt's Point. He was re-elected in 2003.

== New York Senate ==
In 2004, longtime state Senator Olga A. Méndez switched parties to become a Republican. With the district overwhelmingly Democratic, Serrano was asked to run against her. According to the New York Times, which endorsed him, Serrano promised "to pursue unfinished and ignored business in the capital, including legislating an end to the Rockefeller drug laws." He would garner more than 80% of the vote in his victory over Mendez.

Since his initial election to the Senate, Serrano has never faced serious opposition for general re-election. In September 2007, he was named one of City Hall's "40 under 40" for being a young influential member of New York City politics.

In 2019, Serrano was named Chairman of Committee on Cultural Affairs, Tourism, Parks and Recreation, a post he also held from 2009 to 2010.

In 2020, he won reelection against Republican challenger Jose A. Colon with 82% of the vote.

== Personal life ==
Serrano is married with two children.

== See also ==
- 2009 New York State Senate leadership crisis
- List of people from Harlem
