= New York City's 17th City Council district =

- Boundaries following the 2020 census

Government
  - Councilmember: Justin Sanchez (D—Melrose)

Population (2010)
  - Total: 180,064

Demographics
  - Hispanic: 69%
  - Black: 27%
  - White: 2%
  - Asian: 1%
  - Other: 1%

Registration
  - Democratic: 77.5%
  - Republican: 4.0%
  - No party preference: 15.8%
- Registered voters (2021) 102,440

New York City's 17th City Council district is one of 51 districts in the New York City Council. It has been represented by Democrat Justin Sanchez since 2026, succeeding fellow Democrat Rafael Salamanca.

== Geography ==
District 17 covers a series of neighborhoods at the heart of the South Bronx, including some or all of Crotona Park East, Melrose, Hunts Point, Concourse, East Tremont, Morrisania, Longwood, Port Morris, and West Farms. Crotona Park, North and South Brother Islands, and The Hub are all located within the district.

The district overlaps with Bronx Community Boards 1, 2, 3, 4, 6, and 9, and is contained entirely within New York's 15th congressional district. It also overlaps with the 29th, 32nd, 33rd, and 34th districts of the New York State Senate, and with the 77th, 79th, 84th, 85th, 86th, and 87th districts of the New York State Assembly.

== Recent election results ==
=== 2025 ===
The 2025 New York City Council elections will be held on November 4, 2025, with primary elections occurring on June 24, 2025.

2025 New York City Council election, District 17 Democratic primary
Party	Candidate	Maximum round	Maximum votes	Share in maximum round	Maximum votes First round votes Transfer votes
Democratic	Justin Sanchez	4	4,536	62.1%	
Democratic	Antirson Ortiz	4	2,769	37.9%	
Democratic	Freddy Perez Jr.	3	1,842	22.0%	
Democratic	Elvis Santana	2	1,512	16.4%	
Write-in		1	90	1.0%	

2025 New York City Council election, District 17 general election
Party	Candidate	Votes	%
Democratic	Justin Sanchez	14,577	
Working Families	Justin Sanchez	1,611	
Total	Justin Sanchez	16,188	86.0
Republican	Rosaline Nieves	1,983	10.5
Conservative	Marisol Duran	608	3.2
Write-in		54	0.3
Total votes		18,833	100.0
Democratic hold			

=== 2023 (redistricting) ===
Due to redistricting and the 2020 changes to the New York City Charter, councilmembers elected during the 2021 and 2023 City Council elections will serve two-year terms, with full four-year terms resuming after the 2025 New York City Council elections.

2023 New York City Council election, District 17
Party	Candidate	Votes	%
Democratic	Rafael Salamanca (incumbent)	3,693	84.8
Republican	Rosaline Nieves	461	10.6
Conservative	Gonzalo Duran	182	4.2
Write-in		20	0.5
Total votes		4,356	100.0

=== 2021 ===
An interactive map of District 17

In 2019, voters in New York City approved Ballot Question 1, which implemented ranked-choice voting in all local elections. Under the new system, voters have the option to rank up to five candidates for every local office. Voters whose first-choice candidates fare poorly will have their votes redistributed to other candidates in their ranking until one candidate surpasses the 50 percent threshold. If one candidate surpasses 50 percent in first-choice votes, then ranked-choice tabulations will not occur.

2021 New York City Council election, District 17
Primary election
Party	Candidate	Votes	%
Democratic	Rafael Salamanca (incumbent)	5,428	60.0
Democratic	Helen Hines	3,539	39.1
Write-in		82	0.9
Total votes		9,049	100
General election
Democratic	Rafael Salamanca (incumbent)	8,729	80.3
Republican	Jose Colon	1,167	10.7
Black Women Lead	Lattina Brown	964	8.9
Write-in		17	0.1
Total votes		10,877	100
Democratic hold			

=== 2017 ===
2017 New York City Council election, District 17
Primary election
Party	Candidate	Votes	%
Democratic	Rafael Salamanca (incumbent)	4,840	72.2
Democratic	Helen Hines	1,835	27.4
Write-in		31	0.4
Total votes		6,706	100
General election
Democratic	Rafael Salamanca	11,040	
Working Families	Rafael Salamanca	472	
Total	Rafael Salamanca (incumbent)	11,512	92.3
Republican	Patrick Delices	433	3.5
Conservative	Oswald Denis	282	2.3
Empower Society	Elvis Santana	226	1.8
Write-in		25	0.2
Total votes		12,478	100
Democratic hold			

=== 2016 specials ===
In late 2015, Councilwoman Maria del Carmen Arroyo announced she would resign, triggering an election for her seat. Two special elections were scheduled to fill her seat: one nonpartisan election in February to serve the remainder of the calendar year, followed by a standard partisan primary and general election that September and November to complete the remainder of her term. Both were won by Rafael Salamanca. Like all municipal special elections in New York City, the race is officially nonpartisan, with all candidates running on ballot lines of their own creation.

February 2016 New York City Council special election, District 17
Party	Candidate	Votes	%
Community First	Rafael Salamanca	1,455	39.1
Bronx for All	George Alvarez	902	24.3
Bronx Not for Sale	Julio Pabón	562	15.1
Rebuilding Our BX	J. Loren Russell	403	10.8
Strong Together	Joann Otero	265	7.1
Bronx Renewal	Marlon Molina	115	3.1
Write-in		17	0.5
Total votes		3,719	100

The November special election also coincided with federal elections in 2016, including the presidential election, Senate election and other statewide races.

2016 New York City Council special election, District 17
Primary election
Party	Candidate	Votes	%
Democratic	Rafael Salamanca (incumbent)	2,708	62.0
Democratic	Helen Hines	1,651	37.8
Write-in		10	0.2
Total votes		4,369	100.0
General election
Democratic	Rafael Salamanca (incumbent)	34,287	99.9
Write-in		46	0.1
Total votes		34,333	100.0
Democratic hold			

=== 2013 ===
2013 New York City Council election, District 17
Primary election
Party	Candidate	Votes	%
Democratic	Maria del Carmen Arroyo (incumbent)	4,740	69.3
Democratic	Julio Pabón	2,101	30.7
Write-in		1	0.0
Total votes		6,842	100
General election
Democratic	Maria del Carmen Arroyo (incumbent)	10,845	93.1
Republican	Jose Colon	580	5.0
Conservative	Selsia Evans	211	1.8
Write-in		18	0.1
Total votes		11,654	100
Democratic hold			
