= Rafael Salamanca =

American politician

Ralph Salamanca
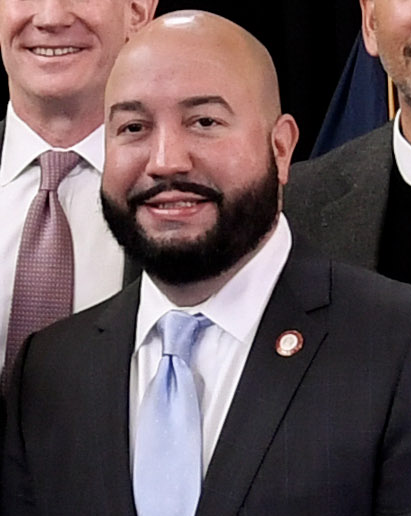

Member of the New York City Council from the 17th district
- In office March 8, 2016 – December 31, 2025
- Preceded by: Maria del Carmen Arroyo
- Succeeded by: Justin Sanchez

Personal details
- Born: July 2, 1980 (age 45) New York City, New York, U.S.
- Party: Democratic
- Spouse: Jessenia Aponte
- Children: 2
- Education: Monroe University (AA)
- Website: Official website

Rafael "Ralph" Salamanca Jr. (born July 2, 1980) formerly served as the Councilmember for the 17th district of the New York City Council. He is a Democrat. The district includes portions of Concourse Village, East Tremont, Hunts Point, Longwood, Melrose, Morrisania, Port Morris, and West Farms in The Bronx.

== Life and career ==
Salamanca was born and raised in The Bronx to parents from Puerto Rico. His father worked the docks at the Hunts Point Market while his mother was an administrative worker in healthcare. Salamanca did not finish high school, but did receive his high school diploma equivalency certificate and subsequently earned an associate degree from Monroe College.

A lifelong resident of the South Bronx, Salamanca began his career working as an administrative assistant for a healthcare services provider and was later promoted Assistant Administrator. He later went on to serve as the a healthcare Center Director in Williamsburg Brooklyn working alongside then Councilmember Diana Reina and with future-New York City Council Member and Brooklyn Borough President Antonio Reynoso.

Salamanca was a member of Bronx Community Board 2, where he would advocate for issues in the Hunts Point and Longwood neighborhoods. He eventually became the District Manager for the board, and also served as the President of the 41st Precinct Council. He gained citywide attention for his work as the Community Board District Manager for shutting down strip clubs in the community that were havens for criminal activity.

== New York City Council ==
In 2015, Councilwoman Maria del Carmen Arroyo resigned from her seat on the City Council. Salamanca entered the race for the special election to replace her and won a six-way Democratic primary election, with 39% of the vote. He was sworn into office on March 8, 2016.

Salamanca ran again in November 2016 to finish Arroyo's term, won his first full term in 2017, and was re-elected in 2021. Salamanca explored but ultimately did not pursue a candidacy for Bronx Borough President in 2021.

In the 2023 elections, Gonzalo Duran, Marine veteran attempted to primary Salamanca for the June elections but was successfully removed from the ballot after a challenge from the Bronx Democratic Party. Duran then switched to the Bronx County Conservative Party to challenge Salamanca in the general election in November. Salamanca won the election, securing his tenure for another two years until the 2025 elections.

Election history
Location	Year	Election	Results
NYC Council District 17	2016	Nonpartisan	√ Rafael Salamanca 39.12% George Alvarez 24.25% Julio Pabon 15.11% J. Loren Russell 10.84% Joann Otero 7.13% Marlon Molina 3.09%
NYC Council District 17	2017	Democratic Primary	√ Rafael Salamanca 72.17% Helen Hines 27.36%
NYC Council District 17	2017	General	√ Rafael Salamanca (D) 92.26% Patrick Delices (R) 3.47% Oswald Denis (Conservative) 2.26% Elvis Santana (Empower Society) 1.81%

== Shooting ==
In September 2021, a stray bullet shattered Salamanca's office window while he was inside with constituents. No one was hurt in the incident.
