= Maria del Carmen Arroyo =

American politician

Member of the New York City Council from the 17th district
- In office February 15, 2005 – December 30, 2015
- Preceded by: Jose M. Serrano
- Succeeded by: Rafael Salamanca

Personal details
- Born: Corozal, Puerto Rico
- Party: Democratic
- Education: Hostos Community College; College of New Rochelle (BA)
- Website: Official website

Maria del Carmen Arroyo is a former council member for the 17th district of the New York City Council. She is a Democrat.

The district includes Belmont, Claremont Village, Clason Point, Concourse, Concourse Village, Crotona Park East, Hunts Point, Longwood, Melrose, Morrisania, Mott Haven, North Brother Island, Parkchester, Port Morris, Soundview, South Brother Island, Tremont and West Farms in The Bronx.

== Life and career ==
Arroyo was born in Corozal, Puerto Rico, and moved to The Bronx with her family when she was seven years old. She is the daughter of Assemblywoman Carmen E. Arroyo.

She attended P.S. 154 in the South Bronx, Junior High School in Harlem, and attended two years at Washington Irving High School in Manhattan before dropping out to assist her family financially by working full-time. She did not earn her GED until she was twenty years old.

Following working as a receptionist, she enrolled at Hostos Community College, where she earned her associate degree before attending Lehman College for her bachelor's, then New York University for her Masters in Public Administration. She served as executive director at Segundo Ruiz Belvis D & TC before working as senior director of operations for the Narco Freedom, Inc, and then as volunteer executive director of the South Bronx Community Corporation.

== New York City Council ==
Arroyo won the special election for her council seat in 2005 after her predecessor, Jose M. Serrano, jumped to the New York State Senate. She easily won election to a full term in 2005, and reelection in 2009 and 2013.

Election history
Location	Year	Election	Results
NYC Council District 17	2005	Special	√ Maria del Carmen Arroyo (D) 49.95% William Alicea (D) 18.67% Alberto Torres (D) 18.48% Charles Serrano (D) 12.01%
NYC Council District 17	2005	General	√ Maria del Carmen Arroyo (D) 99.33% Ali Mohamed (Conservative) 1.67%
NYC Council District 17	2009	General	√ Maria del Carmen Arroyo (D) 96.81% Robert Goodman (Conservative) 3.17%
NYC Council District 17	2013	Democratic Primary	√ Maria del Carmen Arroyo 69.29% Julio Pabon 30.71%
NYC Council District 17	2013	General	√ Maria del Carmen Arroyo (D) 93.06% Jose Colon (R) 4.98% Selsia Evans (Conservative) 1.81%

== Controversies ==
In 2013, it was found that individuals who worked on Arroyo's campaign in 2013 had forged petition signatures for ballot access in her reelection to council.

Over the years, Arroyo has come under fire for issues surrounding gambling.

Political offices
Preceded by Jose M. Serrano	New York City Council, 17th district 2005–2015	Succeeded by Rafael Salamanca
