= Justin Sanchez =

American politician (born 1991)

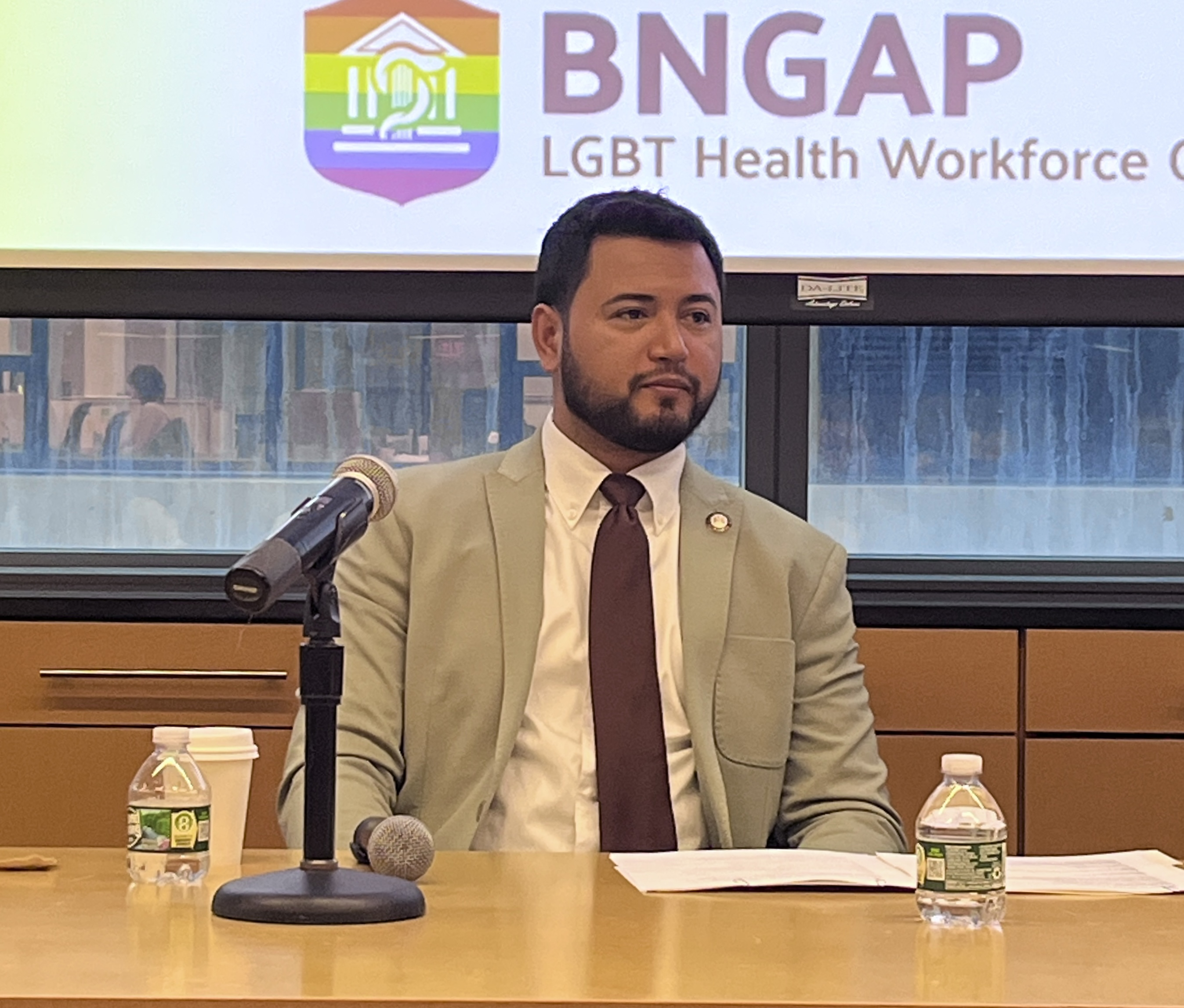

Member of the New York City Council from the 17th district
- Assuming office January 1, 2026
- Succeeding: Rafael Salamanca

Personal details
- Born: July 17, 1991 (age 35) The Bronx, New York, U.S.
- Party: Democratic
- Education: CUNY School of Labor and Urban Studies (BA); New York University (MPA); Fordham School of Law (JD candidate)

Justin Sanchez (born July 17, 1991) is an American politician representing the 17th district of the New York City Council since 2026. He is a Democrat.

== Early life and education ==
Sanchez is the grandchild of immigrants: his grandmother came to New York from the Dominican Republic and his grandfather from Puerto Rico. He attended the University of Richmond but dropped out due to financial reasons, then graduated from the CUNY School of Labor and Urban Studies with a Bachelor of Arts in urban studies as valedictorian and New York University with a Master of Public Administration. Currently, he is a law student at Fordham Law School.

== Career ==
=== 2017 New York City Council campaign ===
In 2017, Sanchez ran for the New York City Council's 14th district against incumbent Fernando Cabrera. He withdrew before the Democratic primary election after irregularities were found in his petitions. He was on the ballot in the general election on the Liberal Party line, placing 4th with 3.8% of the vote.

=== 2025 New York City Council campaign ===
After working as a community board liaison for Bronx Borough President Ruben Diaz Jr. and chief of staff for state senator Nathalia Fernandez, Sanchez ran for the 17th District in 2025. His chief opponent in the Democratic primary was Freddy Perez Jr., a district leader for the 84th Assembly District, who was endorsed by outgoing Councilmember Rafael Salamanca. Sanchez won the June primary with 62% of the vote.

Sanchez's slogan for the general election campaign was "Clean the Damn Streets", focusing on quality-of-life issues in his South Bronx district, beginning with trash and litter on the streets. He won the general election with 86% of the vote.

== Political positions ==
Sanchez chairs the Sanitation and Solid Waste Committee of the NYC Council. He is a member of the Progressive Caucus in the City Council, and, along with Chi Ossé, he serves as co-chair of the LGBTQ+ Caucus.

== Personal life ==
Sanchez is openly gay. He lives in Melrose.

== Electoral history ==
=== 2025 ===
2025 New York City Council Democratic primary, District 17
Party	Candidate	Maximum round	Maximum votes	Share in maximum round	Maximum votes First round votes Transfer votes
Democratic	Justin Sanchez	4	4,536	62.1%	
Democratic	Antirson R. Ortiz	4	2,769	37.9%	
Democratic	Freddy Perez Jr.	3	1,842	22.0%	
Democratic	Elvis L. Santana	2	1,512	16.4%	
Write-In		1	90	1.0%	

2025 New York City Council election, District 17
Party	Candidate	Votes	%
Democratic	Justin Sanchez	14,577	77.4
Working Families	Justin Sanchez	1,611	8.6
Total	Justin Sanchez	16,188	86.0
Republican	Rosaline Nieves	1,983	10.5
Conservative	Marisol Duran	608	3.2
Write-in		54	0.3
Total votes		18,833	100.0
Democratic hold			

=== 2017 ===
2017 New York City Council election, District 14
Party	Candidate	Votes	%
Democratic	Fernando Cabrera (incumbent)	9,826	83.7
Working Families	Randy D. Abreu	1,222	10.4
Republican	Alan H. Reed	411	3.5
Conservative	Alan H. Reed	101	0.9
Total	Alan H. Reed	512	4.4
Liberal	Justin Sanchez	177	1.5
Write-in		7	0.1
Total votes		11,744	100.0
Democratic hold			
