= New York's 84th State Assembly district =

American legislative district

Assemblymember
Amanda Septimo; D–South Bronx

New York's 84th State Assembly district is one of the 150 districts in the New York State Assembly. It has been represented by Amanda Septimo since 2021. She succeeded Carmen Arroyo, following her removal from the ballot due to petitioning fraud.

== Geography ==
=== 2020s ===
District 84 is in the South Bronx. It includes most (or all) of the neighborhoods of Mott Haven and Hunts Point and portions of Concourse, Highbridge, Melrose and Longwood. Yankee Stadium and Hunts Point Cooperative Market, the world's largest food distrubtion center, are located in this district.

The district overlaps (partially) with New York's 14th and 15th congressional districts, as well as the 29th and 32nd districts of the New York State Senate and the 8th, 16th, and 17th districts of the New York City Council.

=== 2010s ===
District 84 is in the South Bronx. It includes most (or all) of the neighborhoods of Mott Haven and Hunts Point, and portions of Concourse and Longwood.

== Recent election results ==
=== 2026 ===
2026 New York State Assembly election, District 84
Primary election
Party	Candidate	Votes	%
Democratic	Amanda Septimo (incumbent)	2,494	59.7
Democratic	Hector Feliciano	888	21.2
Democratic	Courtland Hankins	777	18.6
Write-in		21	0.5
Total votes		4,180	100.0
General election
Democratic	Amanda Septimo		
Working Families	Amanda Septimo		
Total	Amanda Septimo (incumbent)		
Conservative	Tyreek Goodman		
Write-in			
Total votes			100.0

=== 2024 ===
2024 New York State Assembly election, District 84
Primary election
Party	Candidate	Votes	%
Democratic	Amanda Septimo (incumbent)	1,511	72.1
Democratic	Hector Feliciano	565	27.0
Write-in		19	0.9
Total votes		2,095	100
General election
Democratic	Amanda Septimo	18,861	
Working Families	Amanda Septimo	1,442	
Total	Amanda Septimo (incumbent)	20,303	76.8
Republican	Rosaline Nieves	5,328	20.1
Conservative	Tyreek Goodman	760	2.9
Write-in		59	0.2
Total votes		26,450	100.0
Democratic hold			

=== 2022 ===
2022 New York State Assembly election, District 84
Primary election
Party	Candidate	Votes	%
Democratic	Amanda Septimo (incumbent)	1,850	49.9
Democratic	Alberto Torres	1,296	34.9
Democratic	Hector Feliciano	545	14.7
Write-in		18	0.5
Total votes		3,709	100.0
General election
Democratic	Amanda Septimo	9,683	
Working Families	Amanda Septimo	505	
Total	Amanda Septimo (incumbent)	10,188	83.4
Republican	Rosaline Nieves	2,017	16.5
Write-in		10	0.1
Total votes		12,215	100.0
Democratic hold			

=== 2020 ===
2020 New York State Assembly election, District 84
Party	Candidate	Votes	%
Democratic	Amanda Septimo	25,775	
Working Families	Amanda Septimo	1,521	
Total	Amanda Septimo	27,296	84.0
Republican	Rosaline Nieves	3,246	10.0
Proven Leader	Carmen Arroyo (incumbent)	1,281	3.9
Conservative	Linda Ortiz	624	2.0
Write-in		31	0.1
Total votes		32,478	100.0
Democratic hold			

=== 2018 ===
2018 New York State Assembly election, District 84
Primary election
Party	Candidate	Votes	%
Democratic	Carmen Arroyo (incumbent)	6,142	62.6
Democratic	Amanda Septimo	3,640	37.1
Write-in		29	0.3
Total votes		9,811	100.0
General election
Democratic	Carmen Arroyo (incumbent)	19,689	89.8
Working Families	Amanda Septimo	1,209	5.5
Republican	Rosaline Nieves	842	3.8
Conservative	Oswald Denis	180	0.8
Write-in		14	0.1
Total votes		21,934	100.0
Democratic hold			

=== 2016 ===
2016 New York State Assembly election, District 84
Primary election
Party	Candidate	Votes	%
Democratic	Carmen Arroyo (incumbent)	2,154	67.8
Democratic	Jackson Strong	1,008	31.8
Write-in		13	0.4
Total votes		3,175	100.0
General election
Democratic	Carmen Arroyo (incumbent)	26,652	94.2
Republican	Rosaline Nieves	1,606	5.7
Write-in		36	0.1
Total votes		28,294	100.0
Democratic hold			

=== 2014 ===
2014 New York State Assembly election, District 84
Party	Candidate	Votes	%
Democratic	Carmen Arroyo (incumbent)	8,775	91.3
Republican	Angel Molina	691	7.2
Conservative	Franklin Chidi Oleh	135	1.4
Write-in		9	0.1
Total votes		9,610	100.0
Democratic hold			

=== 2012 ===
2012 New York State Assembly election, District 84
Primary election
Party	Candidate	Votes	%
Democratic	Carmen Arroyo (incumbent)	1,370	53.0
Democratic	Maximino Rivera	647	25.0
Democratic	Charles Serrano	560	21.7
Write-in		8	0.3
Total votes		2,585	100.0
General election
Democratic	Carmen Arroyo (incumbent)	25,298	97.6
Conservative	Franklin Chidi Oleh	616	2.3
Write-in		17	0.1
Total votes		25,931	100.0
Democratic hold			

=== 2010 ===
2010 New York State Assembly election, District 84
Party	Candidate	Votes	%
Democratic	Carmen Arroyo (incumbent)	10,896	91.0
Republican	Rosaline Nieves	779	
Independence	Rosaline Nieves	144	
Conservative	Rosaline Nieves	140	
Total	Rosaline Nieves	1,063	8.9
Write-in		10	0.1
Total votes		11,969	100.0
Democratic hold			
