= Bronx Community Board 1 =

Bronx Community District 1 Bronx Community Board 1
- Community District
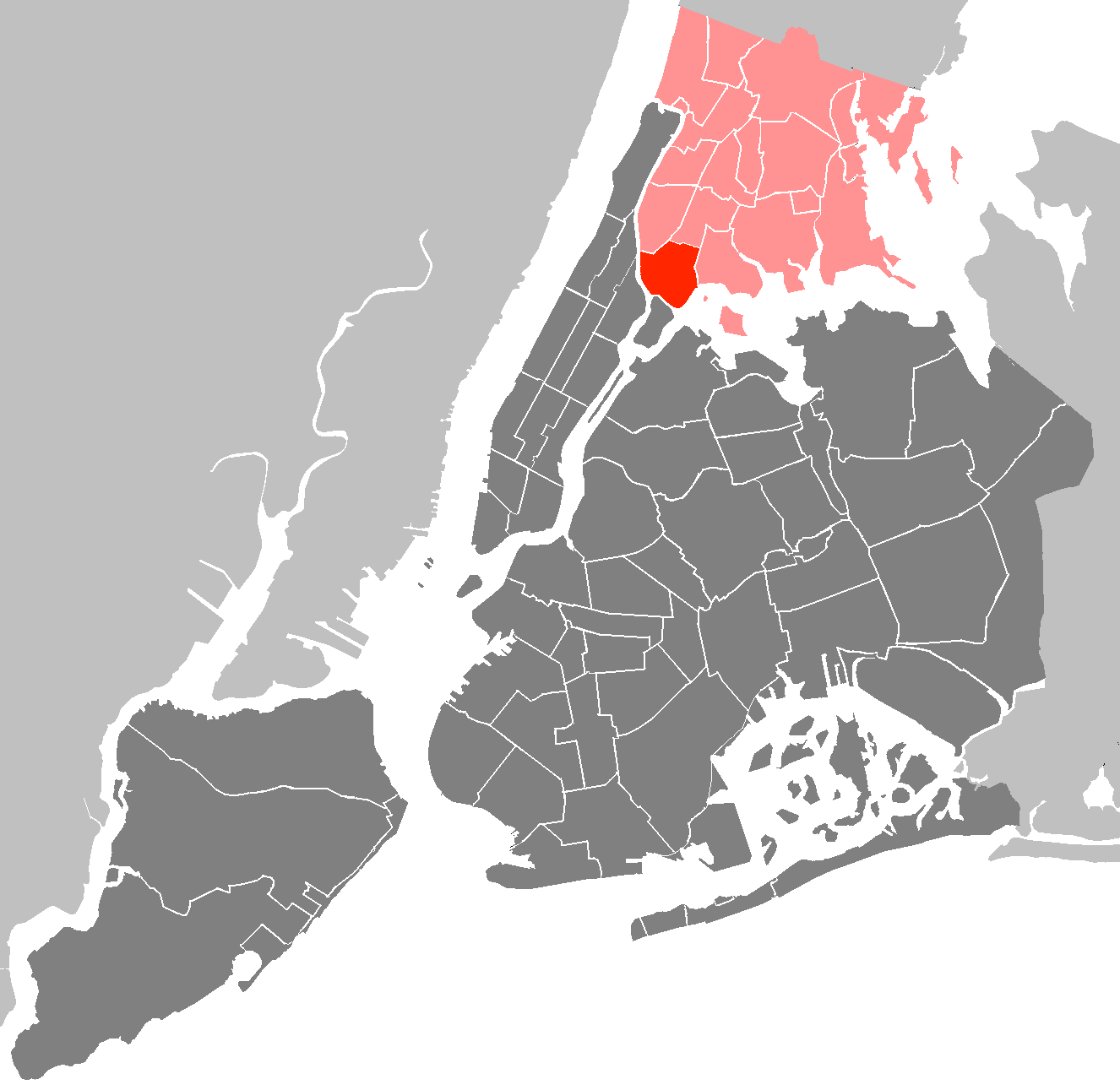
- Location in The Bronx
- Country: United States
- State: New York
- City: New York City
- Borough: The Bronx
- Neighborhoods: list: Mott Haven; Melrose; Port Morris

Government
  - Type: Community board
  - Body: Bronx Community Board 1
  - Chairperson: Paola M. Martinez
  - District Manager: Anthony R. Jordan

Area
  - Total: 2.2 sq mi (5.7 km^{2})

Population (2010)
  - Total: 91,497
  - Density: 42,000/sq mi (16,000/km^{2})

Ethnicity
  - Hispanic and Latino Americans: 68.5%
  - African-American: 27.9%
  - White: 1.7%
  - Asian: 0.8%
  - Others: 1.1%
- Time zone: UTC−5 (Eastern)
  - Summer (DST): UTC−4 (EDT)
- ZIP codes: 10451, 10454, 10455, and 10456
- Area codes: 718, 347, and 929, and 917
- Police Precincts: 40th (website)
- Website: www1.nyc.gov/site/bronxcb1/index.page

Bronx Community Board 1 is a local government unit of the city of New York, encompassing the neighborhoods of Mott Haven, Melrose, and Port Morris in the borough of the Bronx. It is delimited by the East River, East 149th Street, and Prospect Avenue on the east, East 161st Street (from Prospect Avenue to Third Avenue), East 159th Street (from Third Avenue to Park Avenue), and East 149th Street (from Park Avenue to the Harlem River) on the north, and the Harlem River and Bronx Kill on the west and south.

== Community board staff and membership ==
The current chairman of the Bronx Community Board 1 is Paola M. Martinez, and its district manager is Anthony R. Jordan.

The City Council members representing the community district are non-voting, ex officio board members. The council members and their council districts are:

- 8th NYC Council District - Elsie Encarnacion
- 17th NYC Council District - Justin Sanchez

== Demographics ==
As of the United States 2010 Census, the Community Board has a population of 91,497, up from 82,159 in 2000 and 77,214 in 1990. Of them, 64,887 (70.9%) are of Hispanic origin, 23,680 (25.9%) are Black, non-Hispanic, 1,428 (1.6%) White, non-Hispanic, 542 (0.6%) are Asian or Pacific Islander, 177 (0.2%) American Indian or Alaska Native, 216 (0.2%) are some other race (non-Hispanic), and 567 (0.6%) of two or more races (non-Hispanic).

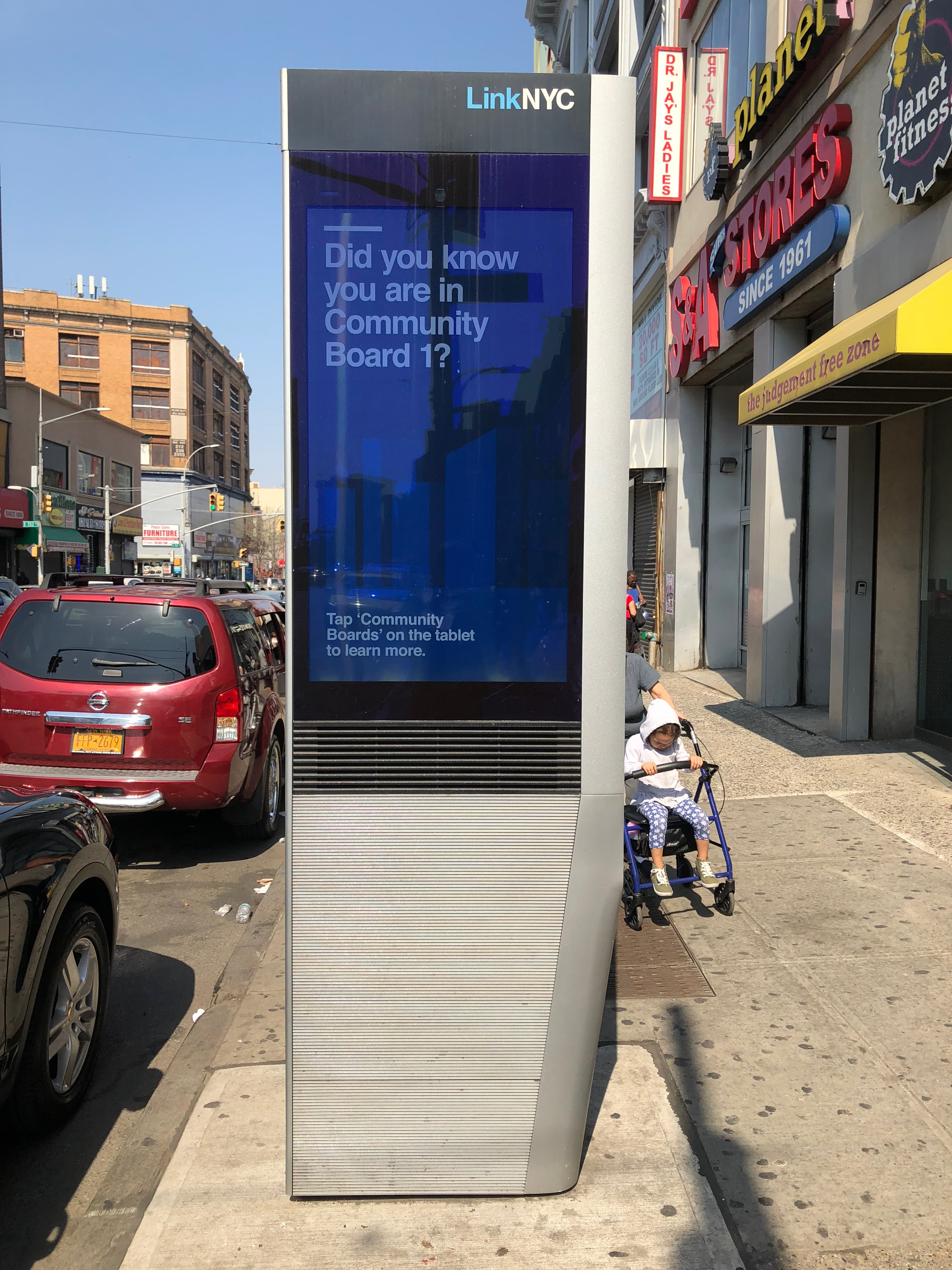
LinkNYC kiosk in the Bronx Community District 1
