= Port Morris Ferry Bridges =

- U.S. National Register of Historic Places
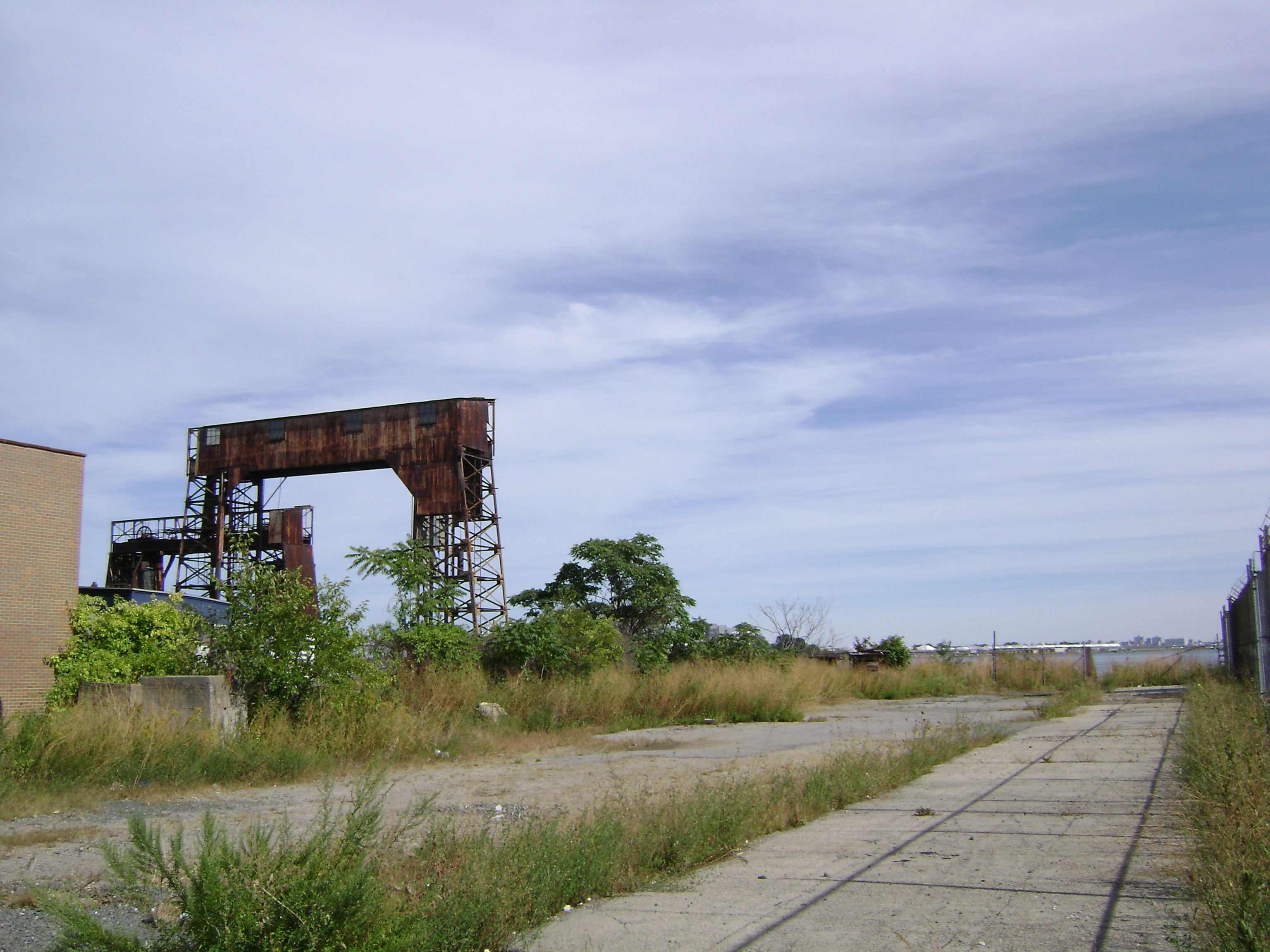
- Port Morris Ferry Bridges, September 2014

- Location within New York City Location within New York Location within the United States
- Location: 106 Locust Ave.., Bronx, New York
- Coordinates: 40°47′58″N 73°54′29″W
- Area: 0.39 acres (0.16 ha)
- Built: 1948
- Architect: Paul Lubroth
- NRHP reference No.: 13001150
- Added to NRHP: February 5, 2014

Port Morris Ferry Bridges, also known as the 134th Street Ferry Bridges, are two historic bridges in the Port Morris neighborhood of the Bronx in New York City. They were built in 1948 by the New York, New Haven and Hartford Railroad, and are constructed of steel and copper in industrial-style truss construction. Each bridge stands four to five stories tall and covered in corrugated steel metal. They feature wire rope pulley systems, wooden gangways, and pontoons. They were constructed to hoist pontoon bridges to link up with barges carrying freight railcars from other railroads across the harbor.

It was added to the National Register of Historic Places in 2014. Today the property is shared by the New York City Transit Authority and the New York City Police Department.
