= Amanda Septimo =

American politician

Member of the New York State Assembly from the 84th district
- Incumbent
- Assumed office January 4, 2021
- Preceded by: Carmen Arroyo

Personal details
- Born: January 3, 1991 (age 35) The Bronx, New York, U.S.
- Party: Democratic
- Education: Vanderbilt University (BA)
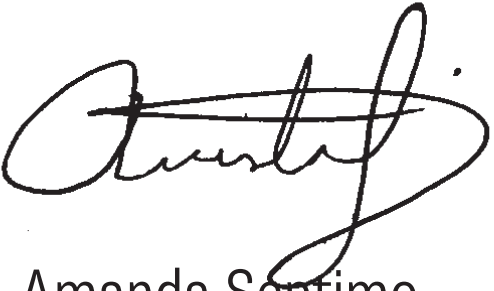
- Signature
- Website: Campaign website State Assembly website

Amanda Septimo is an American politician from the state of New York. A Democrat, Septimo is the Assemblymember for the 84th district of the New York State Assembly, based in the South Bronx; her term began in January 2021, and she was re-elected in November of 2024. In December 2025, she announced a run for New York's 15th congressional district in a crowded field challenging incumbent Richie Torres, but later withdrew.

== Early life ==
Septimo was born and raised in the South Bronx, before attending Vanderbilt University on a full Posse Foundation scholarship in 2008. With one semester left at Vanderbilt, Septimo moved back to the Bronx in 2012 to work for Congressman José Serrano. Septimo returned to Vanderbilt in 2020 and completed her Bachelor of Arts in political science in December 2020.

== Career ==
In 2018, Septimo ran for the New York State Assembly's 84th district, challenging incumbent Carmen Arroyo from the left. Despite receiving high-profile endorsements from 1199SEIU and former City Council Speaker Melissa Mark-Viverito, Septimo lost in the Democratic primary, 63-37%.

Septimo announced a second run against Arroyo in 2020. Before the Democratic primary could be held, however, Arroyo was removed from the ballot for petition fraud, leaving Septimo as the de facto Democratic nominee. Although Arroyo ran in the general election on the Proven Leader Party line, Septimo defeated her easily and began her term the following January.

She was re-elected in November of 2024 and announced in December, 2025, a run for congressional district NY-15. She suspended her campaign following a diagnosis of lupus one month later.

Septimo had planned to run for New York's 15th congressional district against Representative Ritchie Torres for his seat in the House of Representatives in 2026, but withdrew from the race after being diagnosed with lupus.
