= Bronx Kill =

Tidal strait in New York City

Coordinates: 40°47′57″N 73°55′11″W

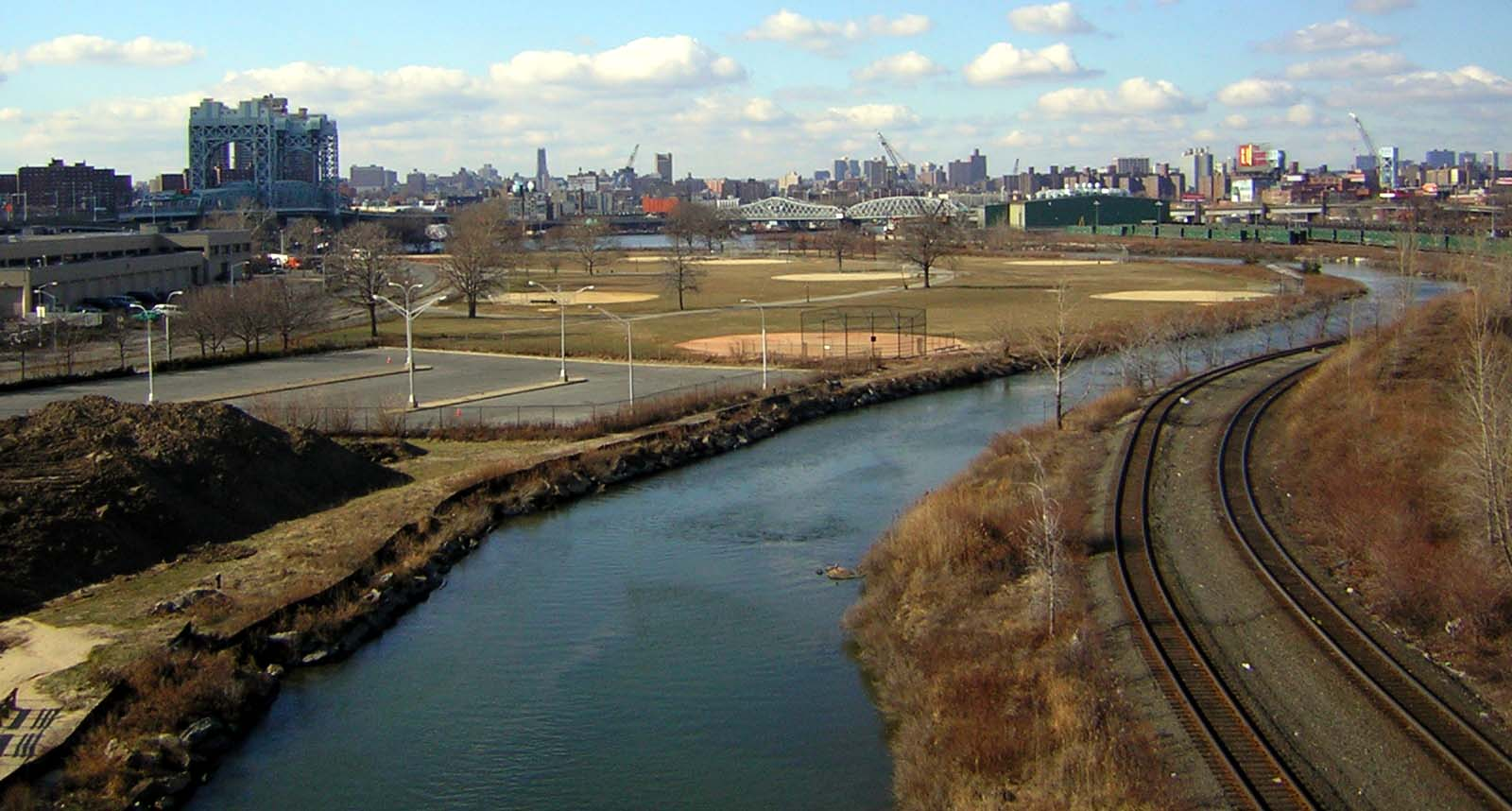
Looking west from Triborough Bridge, high tide

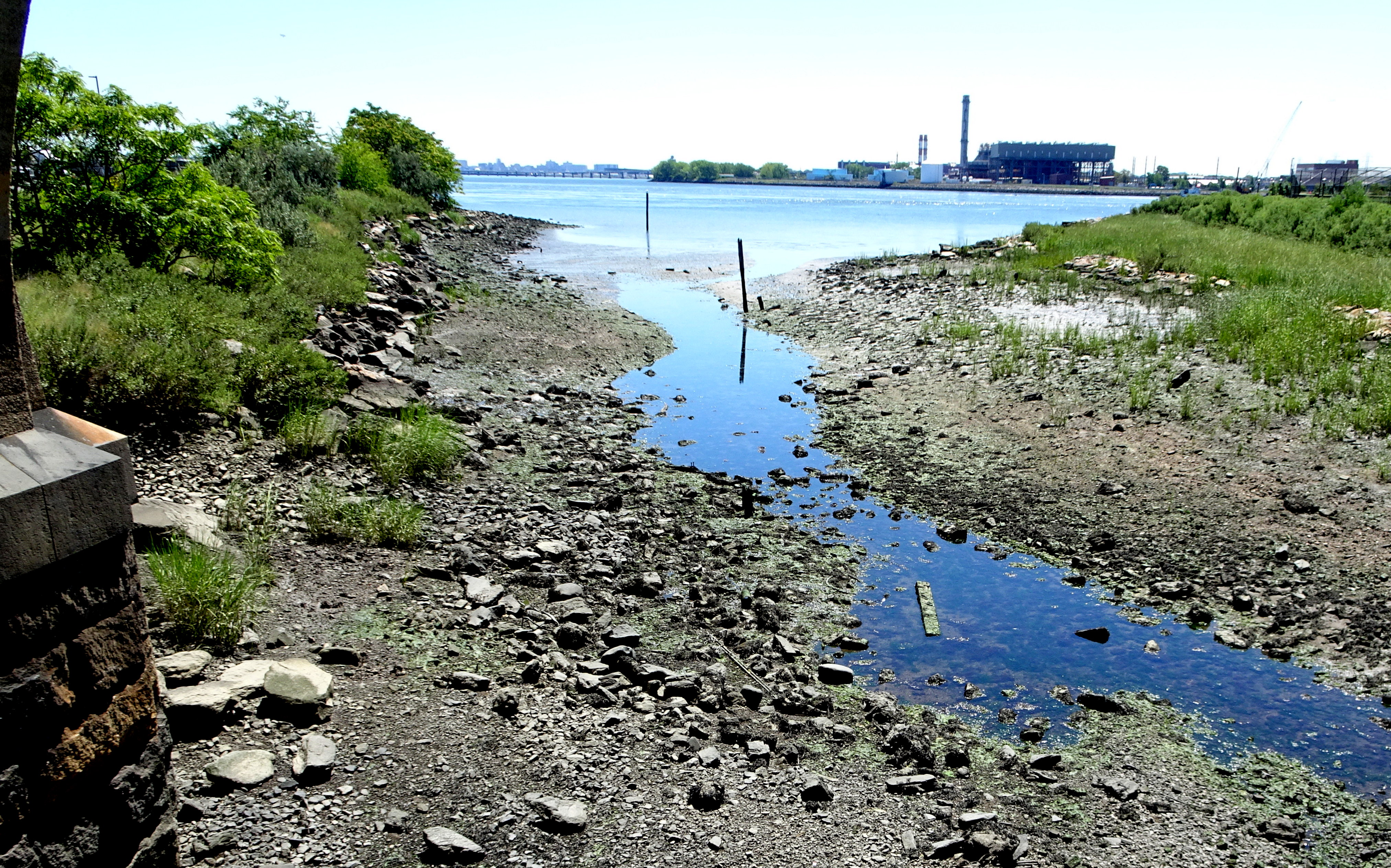
Looking east from under Hell Gate Bridge viaduct, low tide.

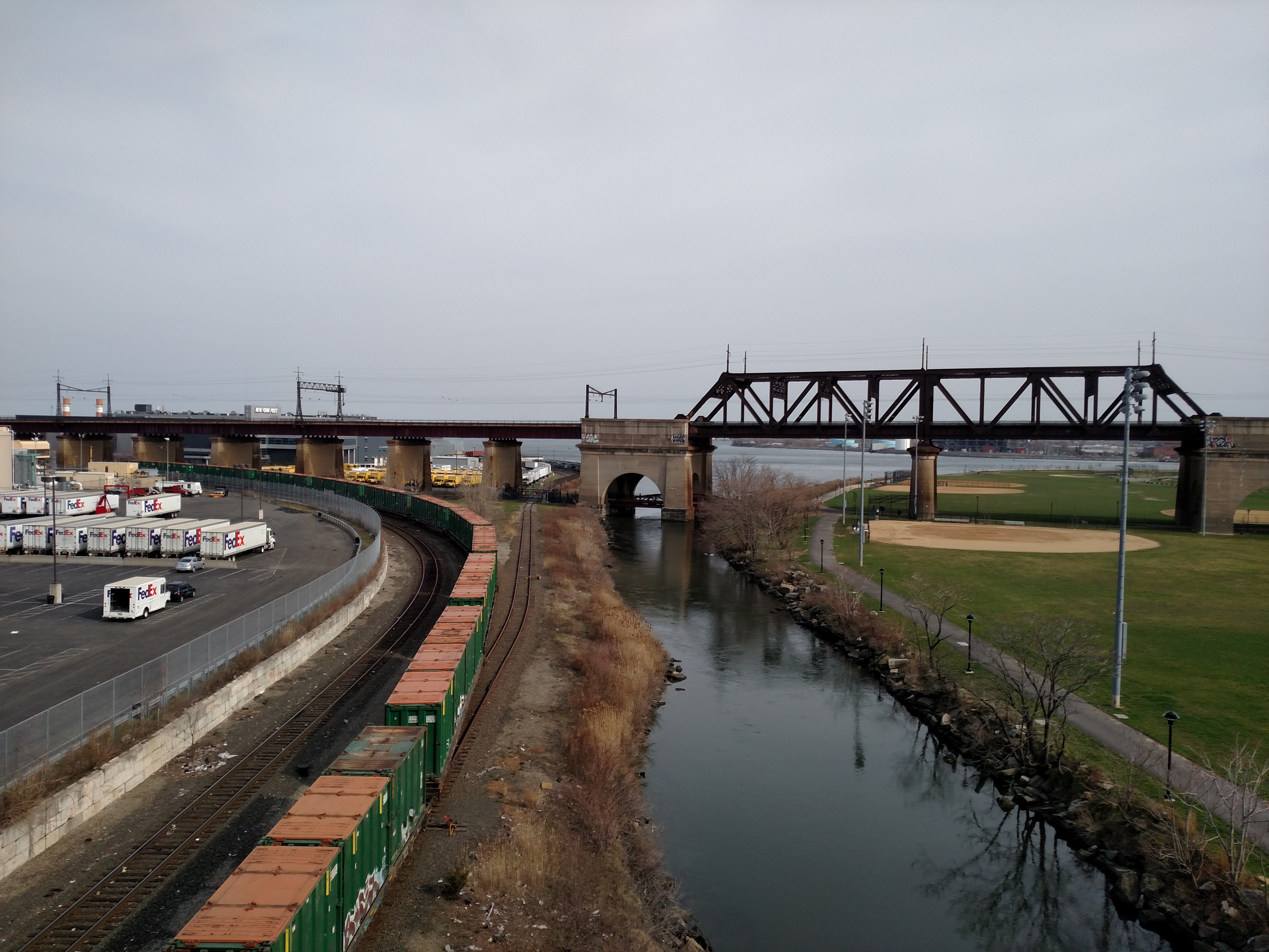
Looking to the east from the Triborough Bridge walkway toward the Hell Gate Bridge viaduct.

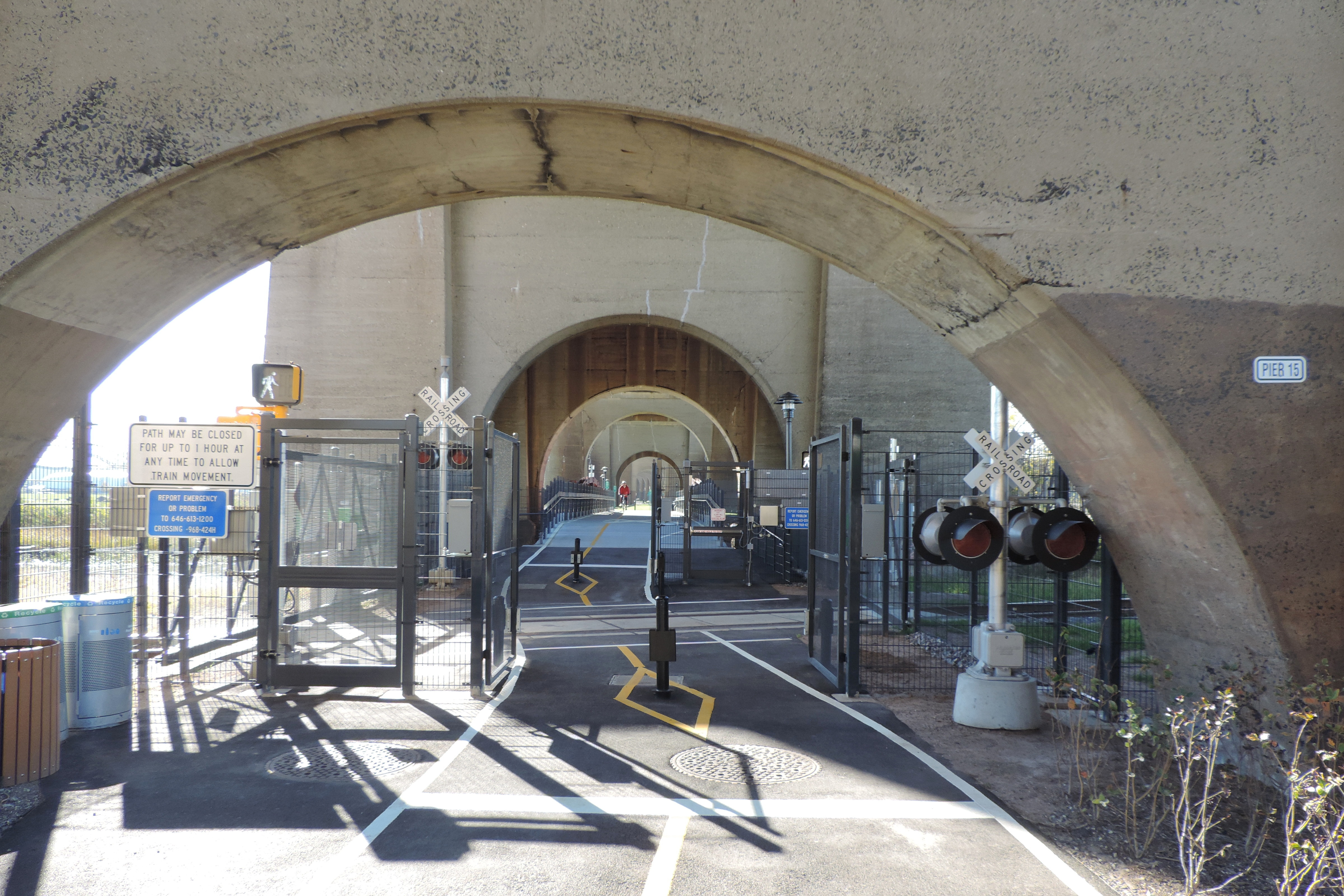
Randalls Island Connector

The Bronx Kill is a narrow tidal strait in New York City delineating the southernmost extent of the Bronx. It separates the Bronx from Randalls Island, running from the Harlem River to the East River.

== History ==
Originally, the Bronx Kill was a sizeable waterway, approximately 600 feet (180 m) in width. As of 1917, there were also plans by the War Department to dredge a 24-foot (7.3 m) deep channel, 480 feet (150 m) in width, to improve navigation and reduce tidal currents. For this reason, in the early 20th century the New York Connecting Railroad built a movable bridge across the Bronx Kill on the approach to the Hell Gate Bridge. Similarly, the truss bridge of the Triborough Bridge across the Bronx Kill was designed to be convertible to a lift bridge. However, much of the Bronx Kill was later filled in to expand the parkland on Randalls Island.

== Navigation ==
The Bronx Kill offers a venue for kayakers and other self-powered boaters without the worry of larger vessel traffic. Canoe and kayak expeditions through the waterway begin on the Harlem River, near the Third Avenue Bridge. Crossings must account for both the direction and depth of tide: at low water, parts of the Bronx Kill entirely bottom out, revealing muddy stretches, and assorted debris. There is also low air draft under the Randalls Island Connector. Consequently, no commercial vessels navigate the kill, with local businesses mostly relying on road and rail transport, including the Oak Point Link along its north bank.

== 21st century ==
In 2001, the New York Power Authority offered to construct a pedestrian bridge linking the Bronx with Randalls Island—part of the agency's remuneration to the community for building two new power plants in the South Bronx. That plan, however, fell by the wayside when local officials argued that an improved Triborough Bridge path would be sufficient. The state authority instead paid for energy efficiency measures in the borough as a whole, including a green roof on the Bronx County Courthouse.

At the time, the two sidewalks of the Triborough Bridge's Bronx Kill span were connected to one long ramp at the Randalls Island end. This provides difficult access. Following years of negotiation for land with the operators of the Harlem River Yards on the north bank of the Kill, the Randalls Island Connector bridge was constructed across the Kill. The $6 million bridge, located underneath Amtrak's Hell Gate Bridge, provides pedestrian and bicycle access between the island and the Port Morris neighborhood of the Bronx and to the South Bronx Greenway. The connector opened in November 2015.

A 2006 plan for a water park—the first in the nation for a large city—on the northwest corner of Randalls Island was controversial. Announced by the Giuliani administration as a $48 million, 15-acre (61,000 m^{2}) project, the proposal expanded to encompass 26 acres (110,000 m^{2}) at a projected cost of $168 million before being cancelled in 2007.

== See also ==
- Kill (body of water)
- List of New York rivers
- Bronx River
