= South Bronx Greenway =

Hiking trail in New York City

Coordinates: 40°48′58″N 73°53′39″W

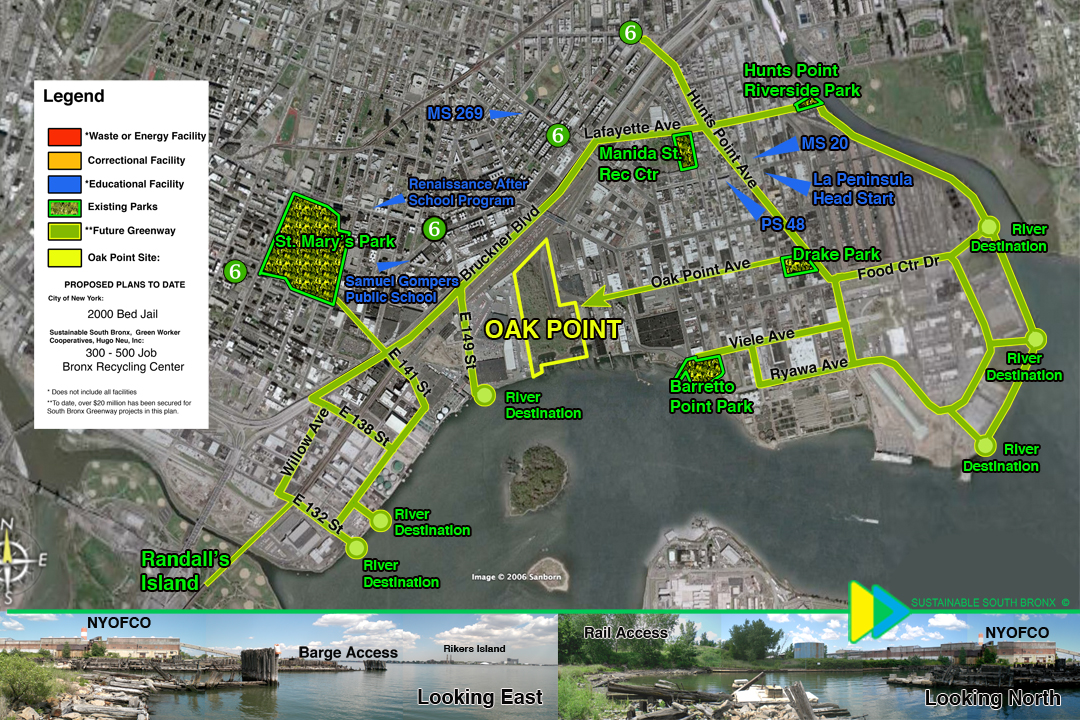
- 2007 planning map
- Length: 10 miles (16 km)
- Established: 2006
- Use: Multi-use, bicycle and pedestrian

The South Bronx Greenway is a project to improve waterfront access, recreational facilities, and transportation systems, including pedestrian and bicycle paths, in the South Bronx in New York City.

== Early planning ==
The project was first envisioned by Majora Carter of The Point Community Development Corporation in the late 1990s as part of a $1.25 million federal transportation grant application. It was formally proposed in the Hunts Point Vision Plan of 2004 and announced by Michael Bloomberg in 2006. In 2014, it was estimated that the total project cost would be $48 million. By 2012, enough of the greenway had been built that New York magazine described it as "transformative".

A three year, $300,000 grant by the Barry Segal Family Foundation funded two Greenway Steward positions. The stewards provided education, outreach, and tree care, as well as construction of street furniture in the area. Sustainable South Bronx also committed $20 million to the nascent project.

== Hunts Point Riverside Park ==
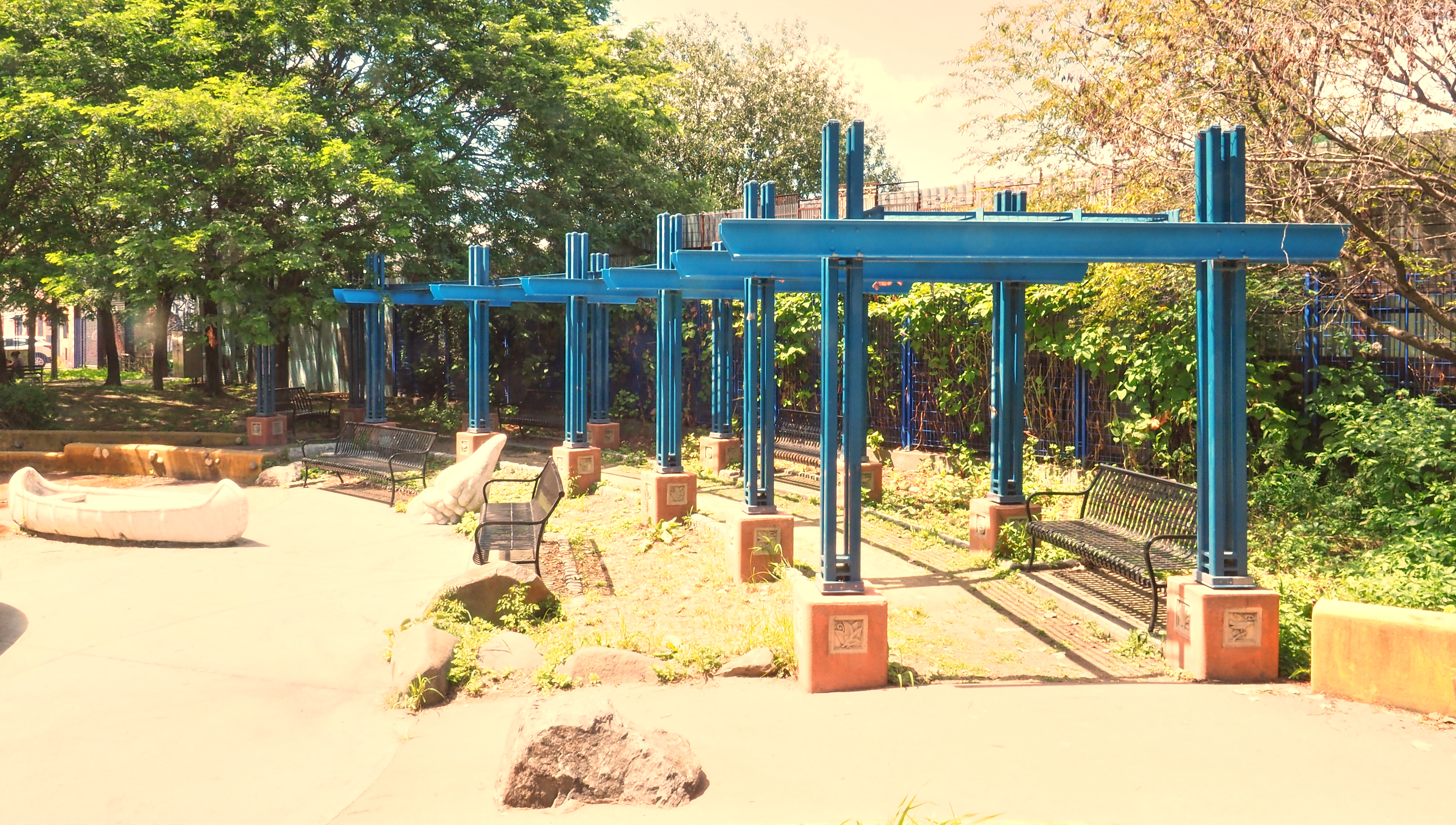
Hunts Point Riverside Park

The first section of the greenway to be built was Hunts Point Riverside Park, with construction begun in 2004 and completed in May 2007. The park occupies 1.72 acres (0.70 ha) and is located at the foot of Lafayette Ave between Edgewater Road and the Bronx River. The park includes a fishing pier, kayak and canoe launching area, a playground, and amphitheater. The project won the 2009 Rudy Bruner Award (silver medal) for "restoring an underserved neighborhood's access to the river".

== Hunts Point Landing ==
The Greenway includes Hunts Point Landing, a park which opened in 2012. The size is cited as 1 acre (0.40 ha) or 1.5 acres (0.61 ha) by various sources. Located at the end of Farragut Street, which was partially demapped, the park includes a fishing pier, and a canoe and kayak launch area providing access to the East River. Granite recycled from the Willis Avenue Bridge when it was replaced in 2005 was used to construct seating in the new park.

Reflecting the land's previous use as a street, it has an 825 foot (251 m) by 100 foot (30 m) outline. The facility suffers from poor pedestrian access, with park users required to "cross wide, desolate streets and contend with truck traffic."

Hunts Point Landing was awarded the 2016 Merit Award by New York City chapter of the American Society of Landscape Architects. The society noted that the park provides "vital public open space and access to the South Bronx shoreline" as well as creating inter-tidal marshes and a pool to control stormwater runoff, and connection to the greenway. An artificial reef constructed using Reef Ball technology provides a habitat for oysters and mussels. The park has been cited as one of the major accomplishments of the Urban Waters Federal Partnership as part of the Bronx RIver Shoreline Restoration project.

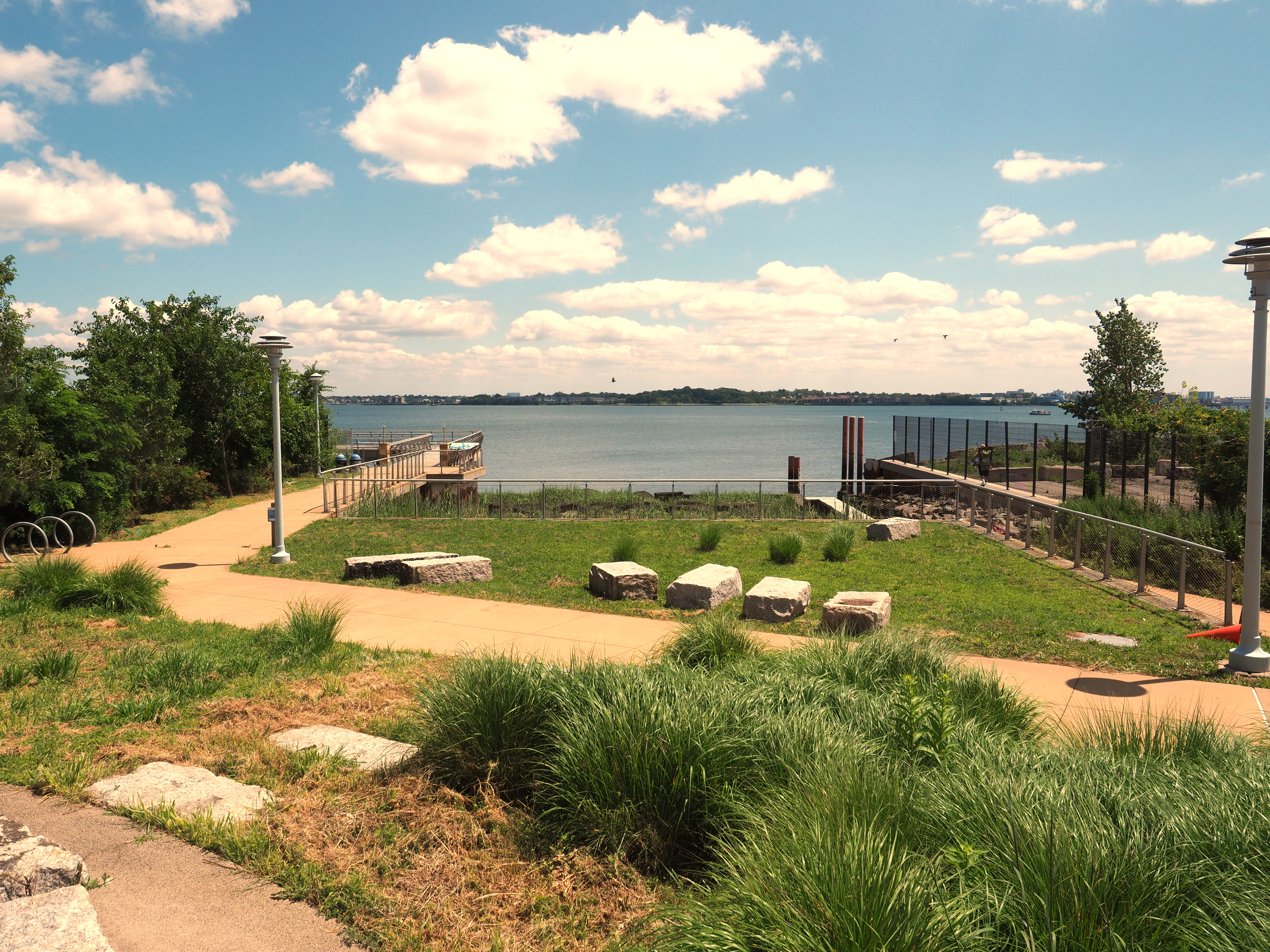
Overlooking the tidal pool towards the East River

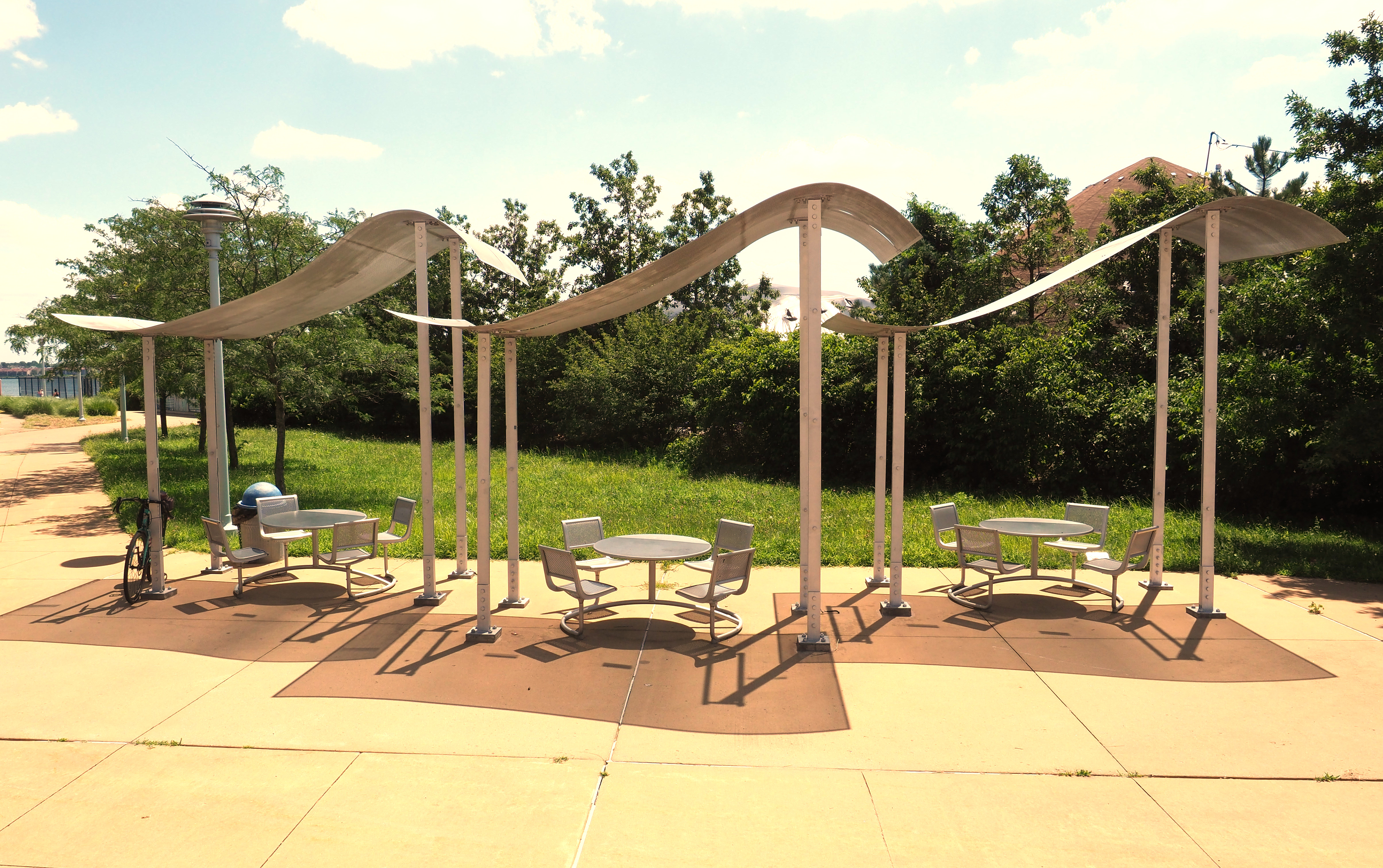
Seating area

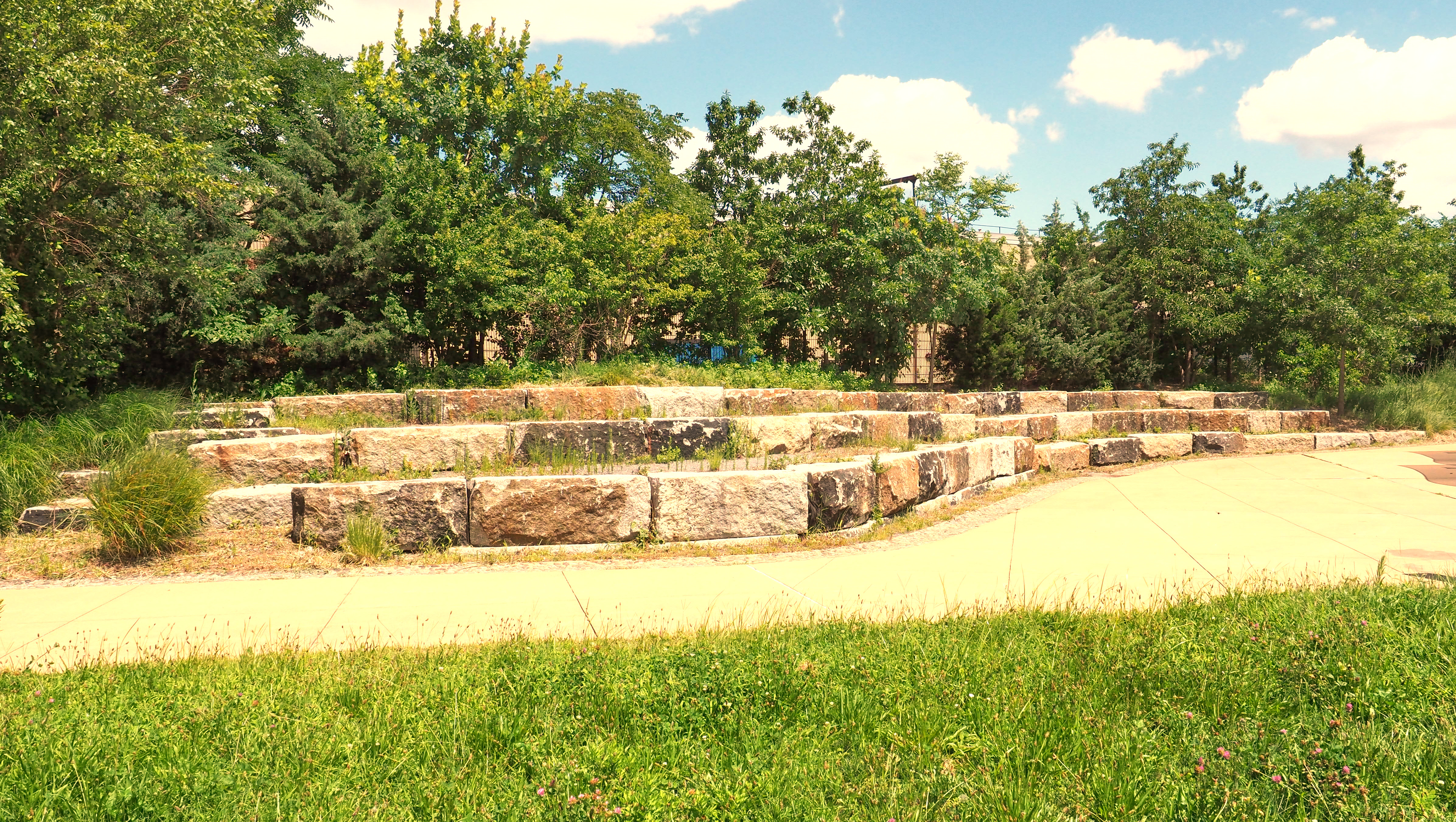
Granite blocks reused from Willis Avenue Bridge

== Food Center Drive ==
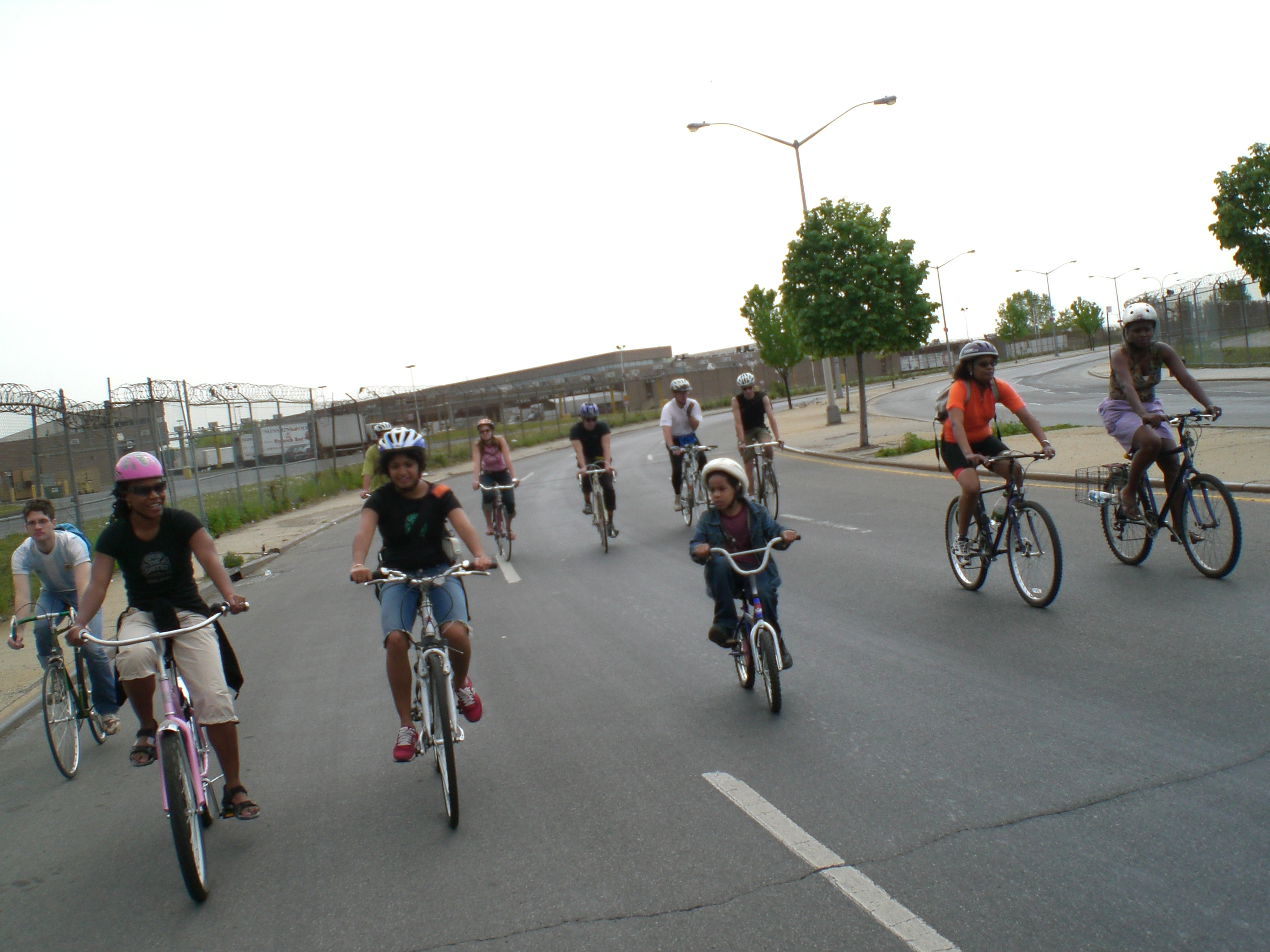
Cyclists on Food Center Drive in 2006, prior to the construction of the bikeway.

The Greenway includes a bikeway parallel to Food Center Drive which was constructed in 2015. This project required remapping Food Center Drive to be a city street, converting it to one-way traffic, and repurposing one traffic lane as the bikeway. The bikeway is separated from the road by a raised curb and rows of trees.

Although some local businesses were opposed to the project, Community Board 2 unanimously supported the plan. Josephine Infante of the Hunts Point Economic Development Corporation noted that the objection was specifically about converting the street to one-way traffic, while supporting the broader Greenway project.

== Randalls Island Connector ==
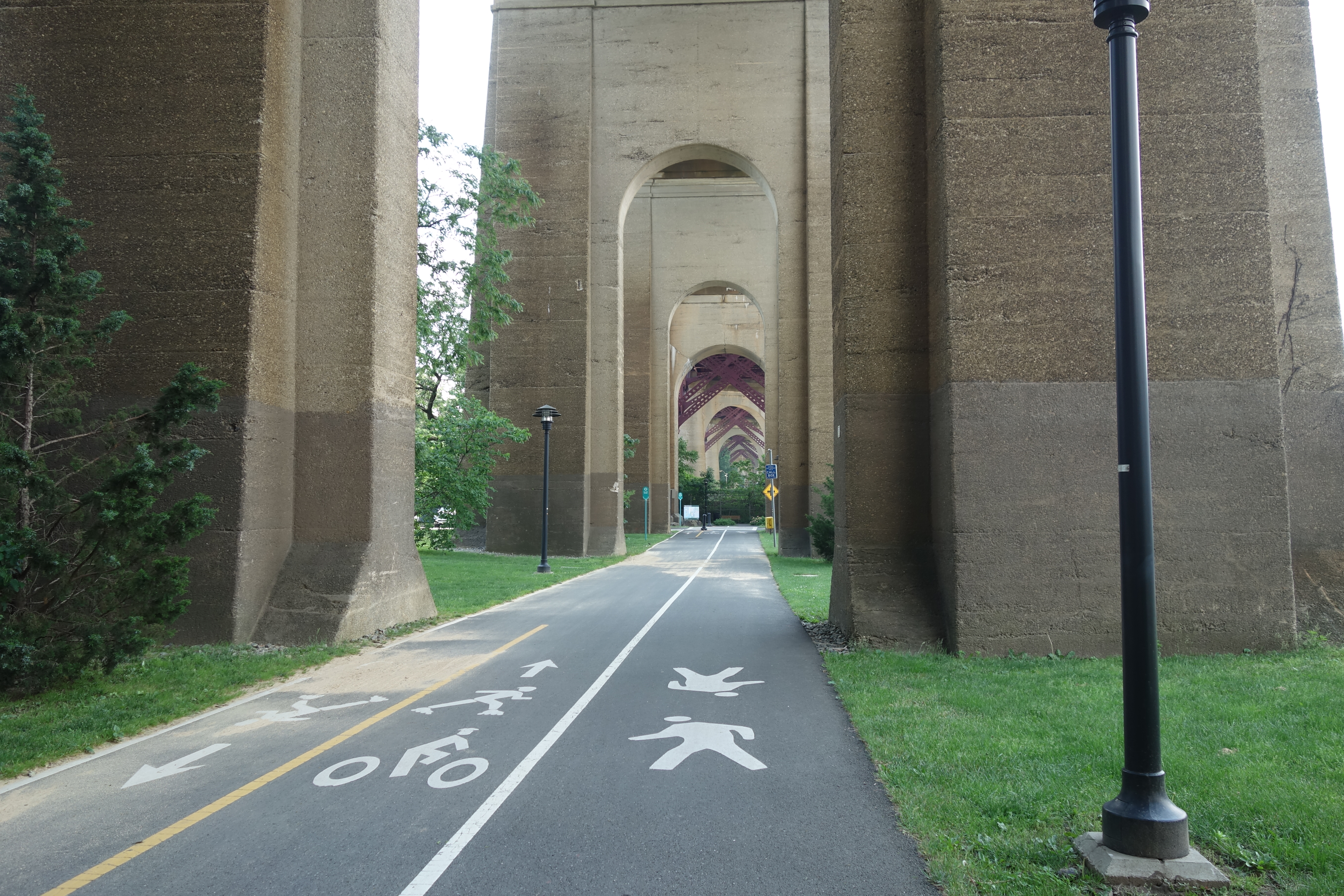
Section of the greenway underneath the Hell Gate Line railroad on Randalls Island

One of the key components of the Greenway is the Randalls Island Connector, which was completed in 2016. This provides a pedestrian and bicycle path from Randalls Island to the Mott Haven neighborhood in the Bronx. This, along with the Wards Island Bridge, creates a route between the Bronx and Manhattan that is completely segregated from vehicular traffic and free from steps. Project cost was $3.6 million.

The connector crosses the Bronx Kill which separates the South Bronx from Randalls Island. Completing the project required obtaining an easement to cross privately controlled land. The land is owned by New York State, but leased for 99 years to Harlem River Yards Ventures, which in turn sublet portions of the property to the New York Post, Waste Management, FedEx and FreshDirect. An additional problem was debris from the overhead rail line falling onto the ground. This was resolved by installing netting.

The Randalls Island Connector earned the 2019 Honor Award for Landscape Architectural Site Design from the New Jersey chapter of the American Society of Landscape Architects. The award recognizes the 0.25-mile (0.40 km) long project for linking residents of the South Bronx with the 330 acres (130 ha) of sports fields on Randalls Island.

An earlier incarnation of the concept was announced in 2001, when the New York Power Authority proposed to build a footbridge over the Kill, and had approved obtaining $500,000 in financing. The project never got out of the early design stage, and no specific location had been set.
