= New York's 29th State Senate district =

American legislative district

Senator
José M. Serrano; D–South Bronx
- Registration: 74.8% Democratic; 6.1% Republican; 16.1% No party preference
- Demographics: 20% White; 20% Black; 53% Hispanic; 5% Asian
- Population (2017): 328,212
- Registered voters: 203,482

New York's 29th State Senate district is one of 63 districts in the New York State Senate. It has been represented by Democrat José M. Serrano since 2005.

== Geography ==
District 29 stretches across a convoluted section of the South Bronx and upper Manhattan, as well as Randalls Island, Roosevelt Island, and Central Park. The neighborhoods it covers include Mott Haven, Melrose, Highbridge, Morris Heights, East Harlem, Yorkville, and a small part of the Upper West Side.

The district overlaps New York's 10th, 12th, 13th, and 15th congressional districts, and with the 67th, 68th, 69th, 73rd, 76th, 77th, 84th, and 86th districts of the New York State Assembly.

== Recent election results ==
=== 2026 ===
2026 New York State Senate election, District 29
Primary election
Party	Candidate	Votes	%
Democratic	José Serrano (incumbent)	11,961	62.9
Democratic	Nicholas Reyes	5,238	30.2
Write-in		130	0.9
Total votes		17,329	100.0
General election
Democratic	José Serrano		
Working Families	José Serrano		
Total	José Serrano (incumbent)		
Write-in			
Total votes			100.0

=== 2024 ===
2024 New York State Senate election, District 29
Party	Candidate	Votes	%
Democratic	José Serrano	60,984	
Working Families	José Serrano	4,733	
Total	José Serrano (incumbent)	65,717	81.7
Republican	Tanya Carmichael	13,242	
Conservative	Tanya Carmichael	1,314	
Total	Tanya Carmichael	14,556	18.1
Write-in		164	0.2
Total votes		80,437	100.0
Democratic hold			

=== 2022 ===
2022 New York State Senate election, District 29
Party	Candidate	Votes	%
Democratic	José Serrano	37,770	
Working Families	José Serrano	2,776	
Total	José Serrano (incumbent)	40,546	99.5
Write-in		199	0.5
Total votes		40,745	100.0
Democratic hold			

=== 2020 ===
2020 New York State Senate election, District 29
Party	Candidate	Votes	%
Democratic	José Serrano (incumbent)	88,643	87.8
Republican	Jose Colon	12,175	12.1
Write-in		124	0.1
Total votes		100,942	100.0
Democratic hold			

=== 2018 ===
2018 New York State Senate election, District 29
Party	Candidate	Votes	%
Democratic	José Serrano (incumbent)	68,681	92.8
Republican	Jose Colon	5,237	7.1
Write-in		75	0.1
Total votes		73,993	100.0
Democratic hold			

=== 2016 ===
2016 New York State Senate election, District 29
Party	Candidate	Votes	%
Democratic	José Serrano (incumbent)	80,844	89.5
Republican	Jose Colon	7,130	7.9
Conservative	Linda Ortiz	2,241	2.5
Write-in		78	0.1
Total votes		90,293	100.0
Democratic hold			

=== 2014 ===
2014 New York State Senate election, District 29
Party	Candidate	Votes	%
Democratic	José Serrano	27,743	
Working Families	José Serrano	2,759	
Total	José Serrano (incumbent)	30,502	89.4
Republican	Kevin Barrett	3,111	
Conservative	Kevin Barrett	478	
Total	Kevin Barrett	3,589	10.5
Write-in		43	0.1
Total votes		34,134	100.0
Democratic hold			

=== 2012 ===
2012 New York State Senate election, District 29
Party	Candidate	Votes	%
Democratic	José Serrano	70,892	
Working Families	José Serrano	1,759	
Total	José Serrano (incumbent)	72,651	94.0
Conservative	Robert Goodman	3,382	4.4
Green	Thomas Siracuse	1,245	1.6
Write-in		31	0.0
Total votes		77,309	100.0
Democratic hold			

=== Federal results in District 29 ===
Year	Office	Results
2020	President	Biden 86.7 – 12.1%
2016	President	Clinton 91.3 – 6.7%
2012	President	Obama 90.8 – 8.5%
2012	Senate	Gillibrand 92.3 – 6.8%
