= Port Morris, Bronx =

Neighborhood in New York City

Port Morris
- Neighborhood of the Bronx
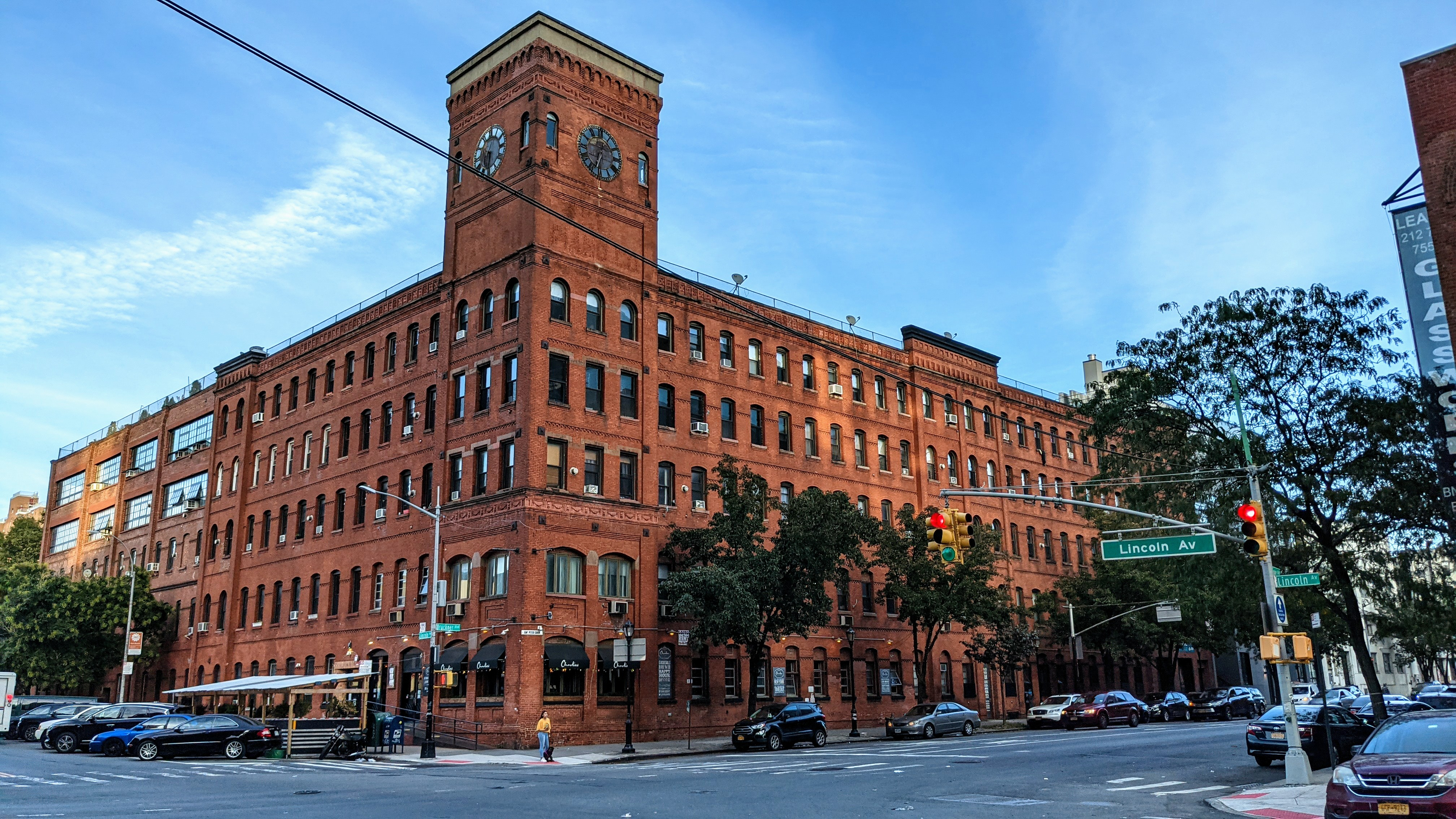
- The Clock Tower, former factory now serving residential and commercial tenants
- Location in New York City
- Coordinates: 40°48′06″N 73°54′35″W
- Country: United States
- State: New York
- City: New York City
- Borough: The Bronx
- Community District: Bronx 1

Area
  - Total: 0.742 sq mi (1.92 km^{2})

Population (2011)
  - Total: 3,523
  - Density: 4,750/sq mi (1,830/km^{2})

Economics
  - Median income: $38,834

Ethnicity
  - Hispanic and Latino Americans: 72.3%
  - African-American: 24.7%
  - White: 1.7%
  - Asian: 0.4%
  - Others: 1%
- ZIP Codes: 10451, 10454
- Area code: 718, 347, 929, and 917
- Website: www.portmorris.com

Port Morris is a neighborhood geographically located in the southwest corner of the Bronx, New York City. The neighborhood is part of Bronx Community Board 1. Its boundaries are the Major Deegan Expressway and Bruckner Expressway to the north, East 149th Street to the east, the East River to the southeast, the Bronx Kill to the south, and the Harlem River (Park Avenue stub) to the west. Its ZIP Codes are 10451 and 10454. The neighborhood is served by the NYPD's 40th Precinct.

Throughout its history, Port Morris primarily served as an industrial and manufacturing district well known for its piano factories. The now-filled Mott Haven Canal and Port Morris Branch provided freight access to the neighborhood. Since the late 1990s, aided by city rezoning, the neighborhood has experienced widespread residential and commercial redevelopment.

Oak Point, the southern tip of the West Bronx, is in Port Morris; it contains the Oak Point Yard. The area is also traversed by the Bruckner Expressway, a major freeway. Most of the neighborhood is within walking distance from several stations of IRT Pelham Line (6 train).

== History ==
The history of Port Morris, as with other neighborhoods, is sometimes confused by the lack of fixed official boundaries. Late in the 20th century the name was sometimes applied to parts that included Mott Haven. Mott Haven by older definition lies to the north and west of Port Morris with the Major Deegan Expressway and Bruckner Expressway serving as modern boundaries.

=== Settlement ===
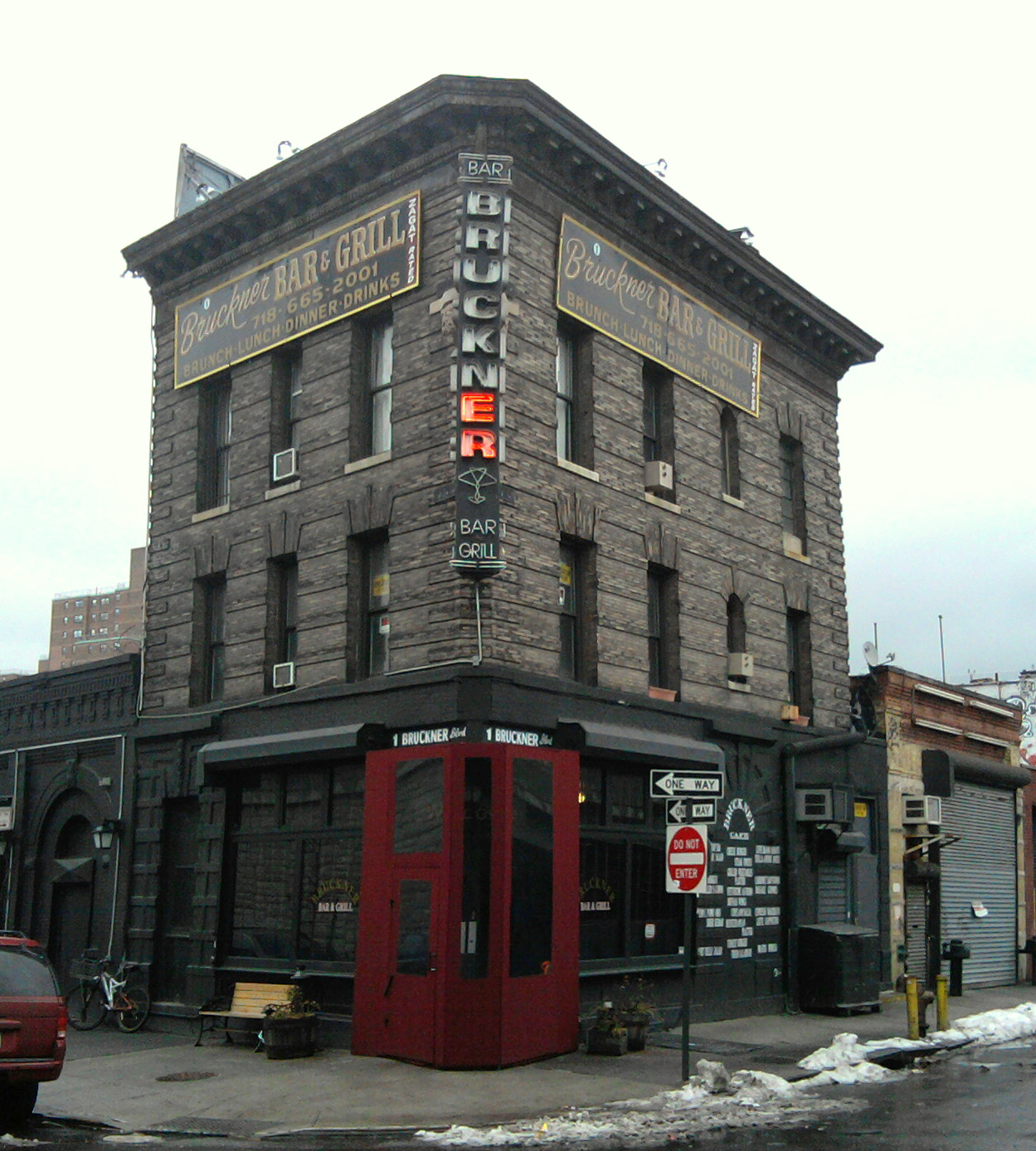
Bruckner Bar & Grill at Bruckner Blvd and Third Avenue

There is some evidence that a British paymaster ship went down off Port Morris's coast during the American Revolutionary War with millions of dollars in gold aboard. The cargo has never been recovered.

The name comes from a deep water port established along the neighborhood's East River (Long Island Sound) waterfront by Gouverneur Morris Jr., son of Gouverneur Morris, in 1842. He built a two-mile (3 km) railroad from Melrose to his family's holdings on the waterfront, later called the Spuyten Duyvil and Port Morris Railroad, abandoned a hundred years later.

=== Development ===
The area is dominated by factory and warehouse buildings constructed in the mid-to-late 19th century, convenient to the railroad yards, of which the Oak Point Yard is the main survivor. Notable early businesses were the R. Hoe Co.; Cutler & Hammer Tool Works; Mothers Friend Shirt Waist factory (1888) at Willow Avenue between East 135th and 136th Streets; and the Estey Piano Company Factory (now designated a city landmark by the New York City Landmarks Preservation Commission). While many of the early industrial buildings remain, they are little used for manufacturing anymore.

In the 1870s the Mott Haven Canal emptied out into the Western Port Morris riverfront serving industry in the Mott Haven area. After being declared a "nuance" by the Board of Health in 1896 the canal was slowly re-filled, its last segment being in use until 1960s. Today only a small indentation in the Harlem River remains

The area was the site of the Hell Gate generating plant of Consolidated Edison, where George Metesky, the Mad Bomber who plagued New York City for decades, was injured.

The most notable architectural/engineering feature of Port Morris is the northern approach to the Hell Gate Bridge supported by concrete arches (1917) northward from East 132nd Street, between Willow & Walnut Avenues. Plans are afoot to extend the South Bronx Greenway to Randalls Island, crossing Bronx Kill via the Randall's Island Connector under Hell Gate Bridge. The Connector opened in November 2015.

A wave of arson during the 1970s destroyed or damaged many residential, commercial, and industrial structures in the area. Late in the century industry began to return to Port Morris. Many abandoned residential buildings are also being rehabilitated and designated low income housing.

=== Re-zoning ===
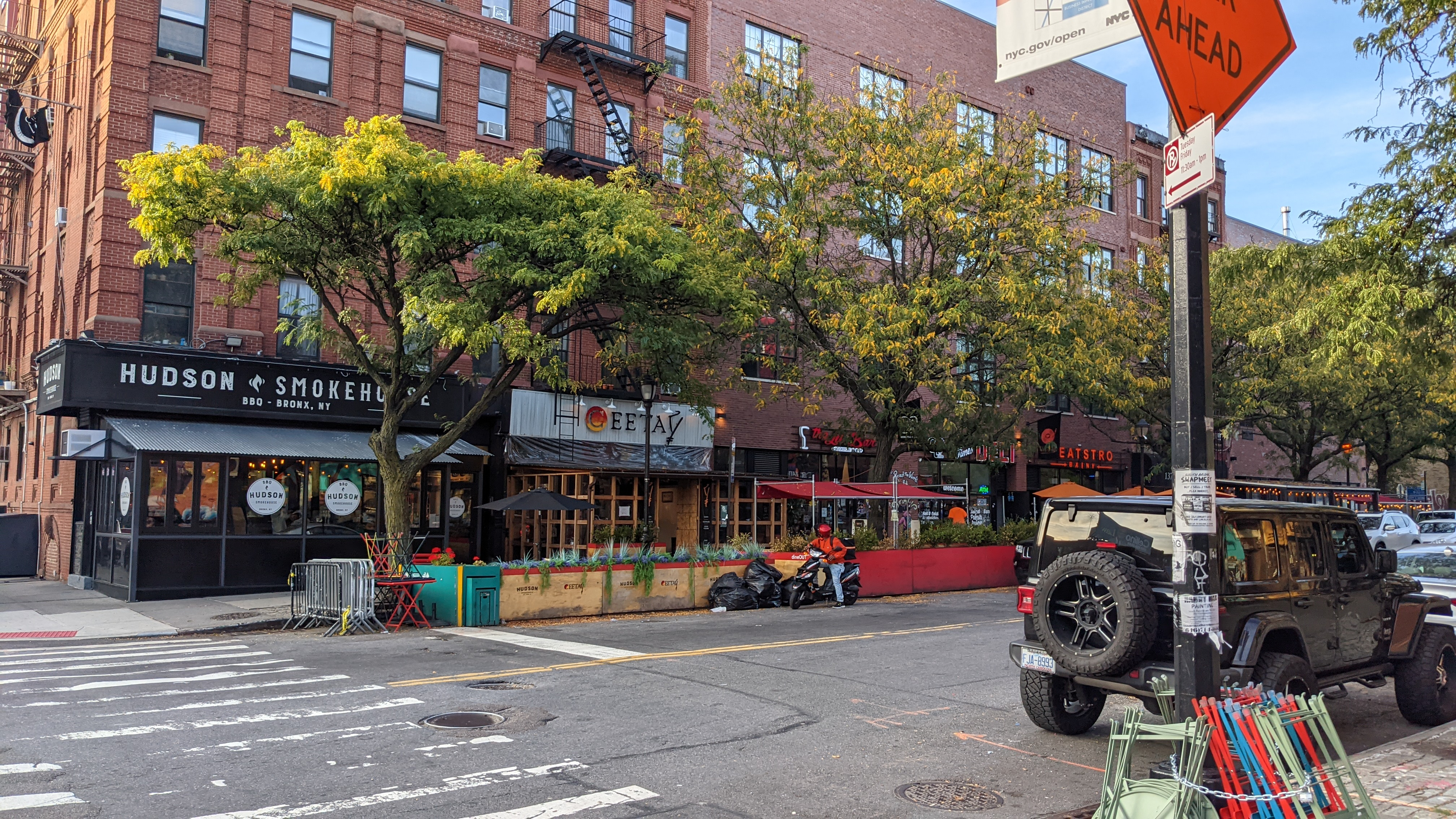
Alexander Avenue part of NYC's Open Street program implemented during COVID19 pandemic

In 1997 the New York City council created the "Port Morris Special Mixed-used District", the site of the first special mixed-use district (MX-1) resulting in the rehabilitation of several blocks of residential row-houses between Bruckner Boulevard and East 134th Street in an area which only previously allowed industrial uses. Following the success of the 1997 re-zoning, the city further expanded this district in 2005 to include all of western Port Morris (south of Major Deegan Expressway and west of RFK Bridge). In December 2017 the city council approved the expansion of the "Special Harlem River Waterfront District" to cover two super blocks in western Port Morris. This latest rezoning allowed high-density mixed-used development along the banks of the Harlem River from Lincoln Avenue north through Mott Haven up to 150th Street in Concourse Village.

=== Redevelopment and gentrification ===
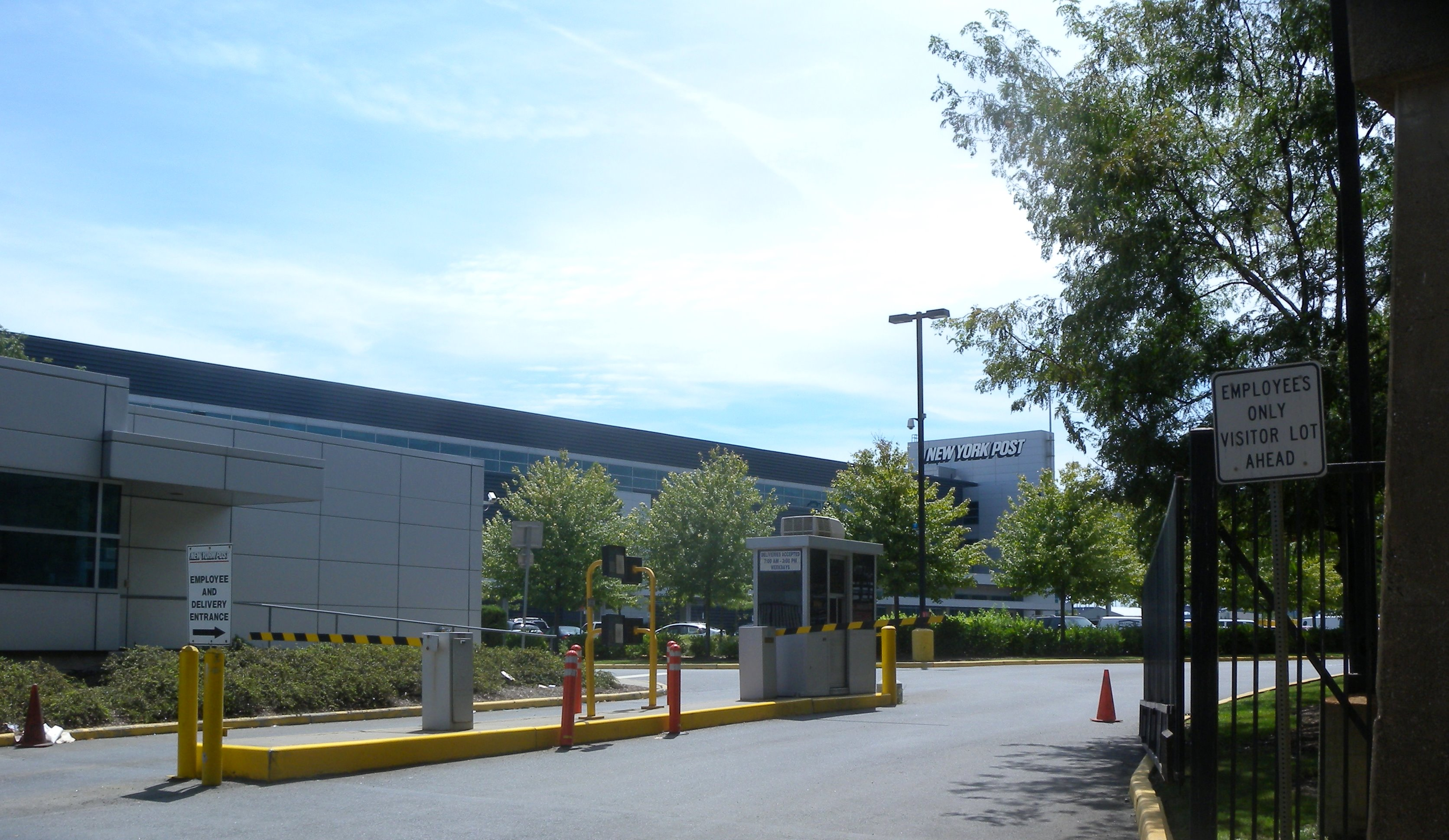
132nd Street gate of New York Post printing plant

The neighborhood has been experiencing massive revitalization with many historic warehouses, factories and various manufacturing buildings being converted into lofts. The former Estey Piano Corp factory, now The Clock Tower, has the restaurant Charlies Bar & Kitchen operating on the ground level. Port Morris has become a burgeoning community of artists and other young professionals looking for more reasonable options outside of Manhattan. Efforts by the New York Restoration Project are underway to revive the waterfront in an area that historically suffers from high asthma rates. This will create much-needed green space for the community. As a result of these changes, the neighborhood is slowly becoming a hub for upscale eateries in the South Bronx. Additionally, in 2015, Silvercup Studios announced it would convert a 115,000-square-foot warehouse at 295 Locust Avenue for film and television productions. Silvercup North, as the facility was known, opened in mid-2016.

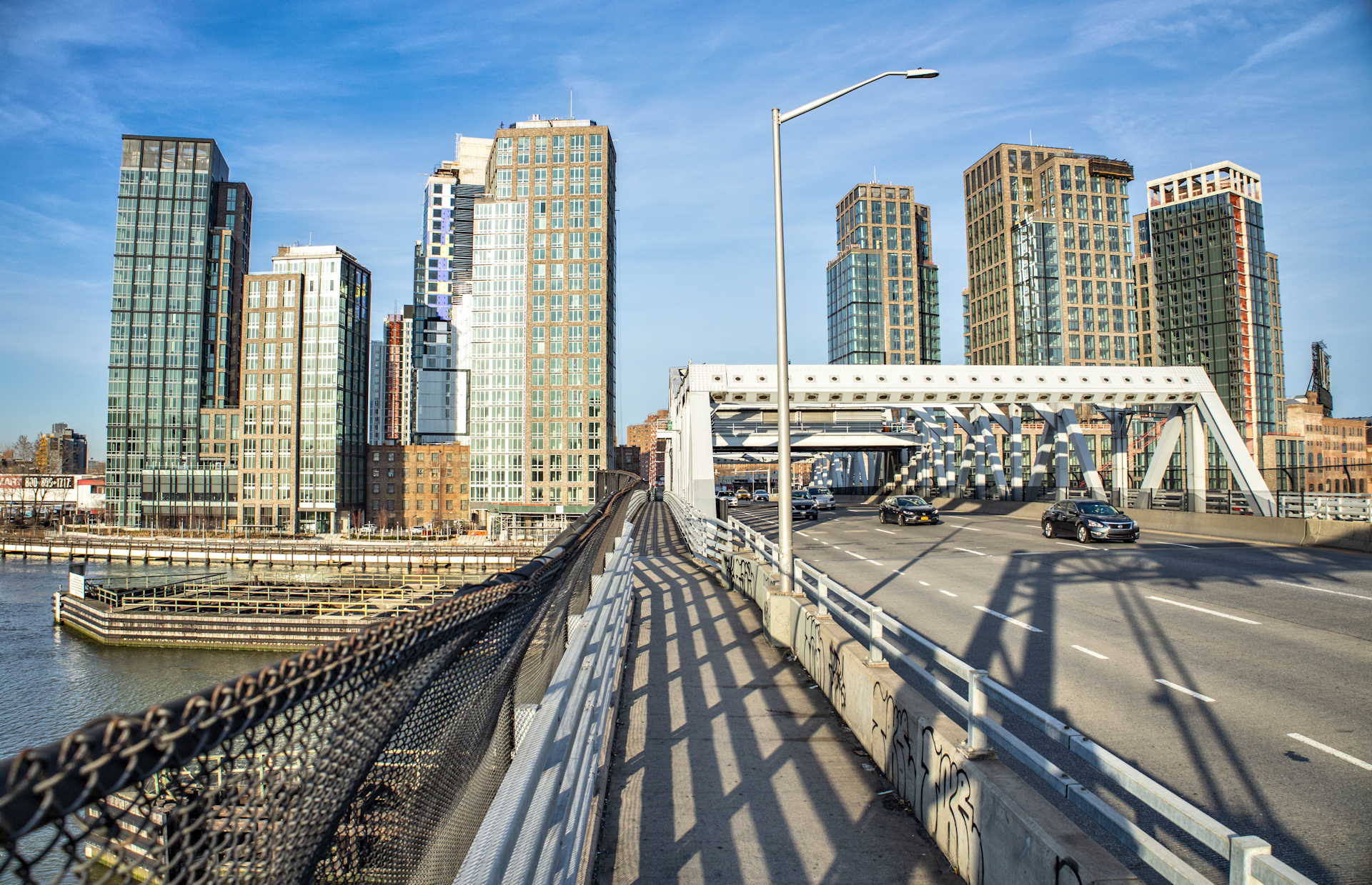
View of Port Morris, The Bronx along the banks of the Harlem River (Third Avenue Bridge)

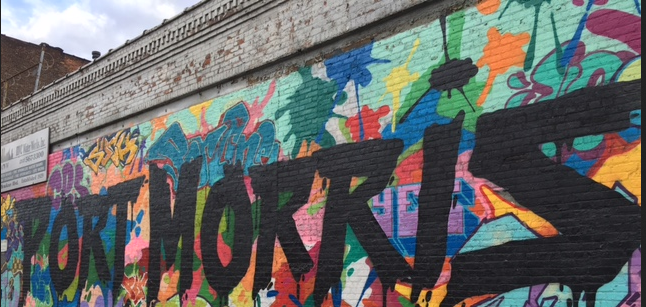
Old Port Morris Mural at 40 Bruckner Blvd - Alexander Avenue

The Piano District is the name proposed by two developers for Port Morris. The two developers, Somerset Partners and The Chetrit Group, purchased two riverfront properties for $58 million with the goals of establishing luxury residences and retail. However, there is opposition to the renaming, and critics and proponents have accused one another of racism. The developers were criticized by Melissa Mark-Viverito, the president of the New York City Council for conducting a Halloween rave, attended by numerous celebrities and featuring flaming trash cans and hulks of burnt-out and bullet-riddled cars. Mark-Viverito accused the developers of a lack of empathy and basic awareness.

Additional developments continued to take place at Port Morris. In June 2016, the Bluestone Group purchased a 235,584-square-foot (21,886.5 m^{2}) former factory building at 825 East 141st Street for $44 million; That building was renovated in 2019 and became Union Crossing, a mixed-use development with offices, retail spaces, and studios. In 2020, renting commenced for The Arches at 224-228 East 135th Street, the first market-rate high-rise rental development in Port Morris. Another rental development at 101 Bruckner Boulevard, with 55 units, was announced in early 2021. In addition, Brookfield Properties developed "Bankside", a complex of seven high-rise residential towers on the banks of the Harlem River with over 1,350 units. The first phase at 2401 Third Avenue was topped out during 2021. Bankside includes a public esplanade along the Harlem River. A high-rise residential development was announced at 2455 Third Avenue in late 2021. The development is now marketed as "The Motto" with rentals slated for Q4 2023.

A 27-story residential market-rate development at 2413 Third Avenue broke ground in October 2021 marketed as "Maven: Mott Haven" which is set for completion in fall 2023, with 200 apartments. Permits were filed in late 2021 for a mixed-development 11-story project at 188 East 135th currently in demolition and brownfield site cleanup stage. Along the Bruckner Boulevard corridor there ongoing mid-rise mixed-use residential development at 40, 91, and 138 Bruckner.

Port Morris will be at the forefront of the newly planned Bronx Harlem River Greenway. This Greenway is envisioned to connect the "Randall's Island Connector" and the South Bronx Greenway heading west through Port Morris and continuing North using a combination of Harlem River waterfront access and abandoned rail ROW (see New York and Putnam Railroad) and terminating at Van Cortland Park in the Northwest Bronx in conjunction with parallel projects such as the "Tibbetts Brook Daylighting".

== Demographics ==
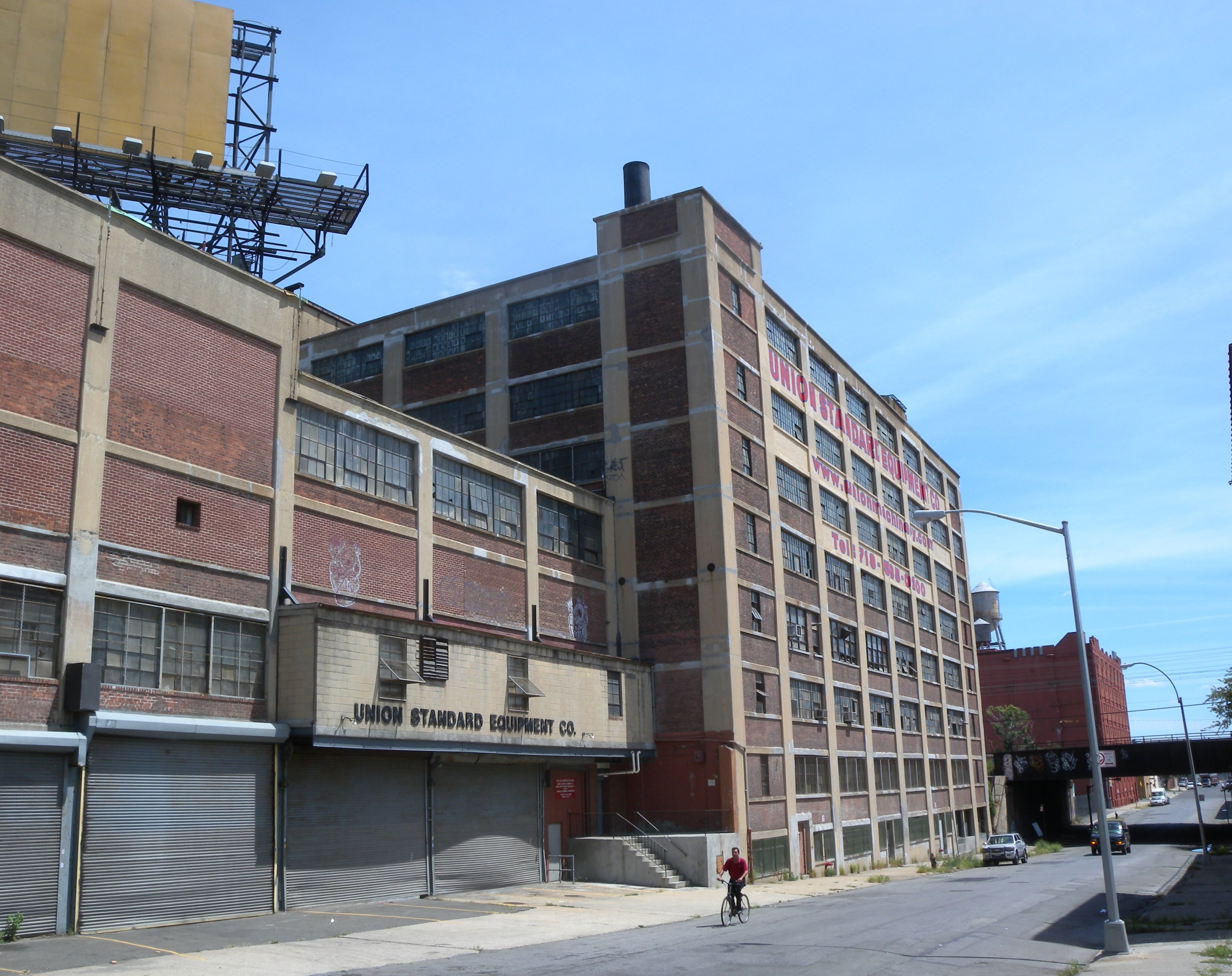
Union Standard Equipment at 141st Street

Port Morris predominantly consists of Latin Americans (primarily Puerto Rican), African Americans as well as a small white population concentrated mainly in the western portion of Bruckner Boulevard. Almost half of the population lives below the federal poverty line and receives public assistance (TANF, Home Relief, Supplemental Security Income, and Medicaid). Nonetheless, the median income is significantly higher than that of other South Bronx neighborhoods. This is likely due to recent rezoning to increase commercial and residential activity in the area.

Based on data from the 2010 United States census, the population of Mott Haven and Port Morris was 52,413, a change of 3,383 (6.5%) from the 49,030 counted in 2000. Covering an area of 951.01 acres (384.86 ha), the neighborhood had a population density of 55.1 inhabitants per acre (35,300/sq mi; 13,600/km^{2}).

The racial makeup of the neighborhood was 1.7% (867) White, 24.7% (12,927) African American, 0.2% (95) Native American, 0.4% (214) Asian, 0% (7) Pacific Islander, 0.2% (124) from other races, and 0.6% (310) from two or more races. Hispanic or Latino of any race were 72.3% (37,869) of the population.

== Land use ==
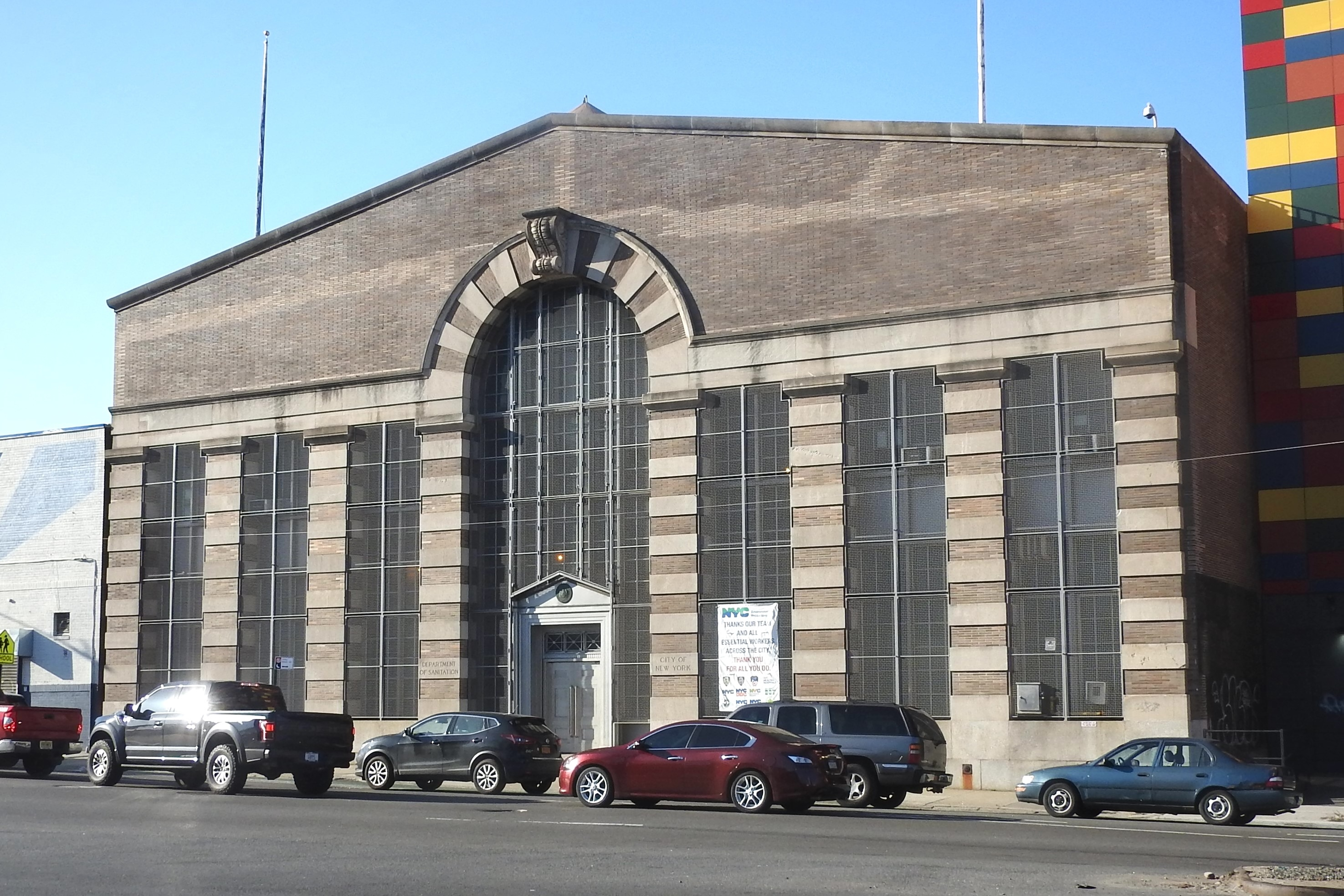
View of north facade of the Bronx Grit Chamber, a protected city landmark

Port Morris contains a variety of zoning districts ranging from manufacturing, commercial, residential, and mixed-use. The eastern half of Port Morris contains primarily light industrial, warehousing and distribution uses guided by the Port Morris Industrial Business Zone. The Bruckner Boulevard corridor is primarily a mixed-use corridor transitioning from previous industrial uses to commercial and residential usage spurred by the Port Morris Special Mixed-Use District re-zoning laws. The western end of Port Morris is rapidly transitioning from light-industrial uses to high-density residential developments along the newly created "Special Harlem River Waterfront District". The area centered in Alexander Avenue-Bruckner Blvd is now the main commercial corridor in the neighborhood with a growing crop of restaurants and other services.

=== Landmarked buildings ===
==== City landmarks ====
Two structures in Port Morris have been landmarked by the city's Landmarks Preservation Commission. The Estey Piano Company Factory, now referred to as the "Clock Tower", is located at the corner of Lincoln and Bruckner Boulevard. While the Clock Tower is now a commercial and residential building, it is reminiscent of the time period in which Port Morris was a hub for piano manufacturing in the city.

The Bronx Grit Chamber is a 1937 neoclassical structure located at East 132nd Street and St. Ann's Avenue, built as part of the larger sewage treatment complex in Wards Island. The Bronx Grit Chamber, designed by the architectural firm McKim, Mead and White, processes raw sewage by removing large particles on its way to further treatment at the Wards Island Water Pollution Control Plant. It is currently managed by the New York City Department of Environmental Protection.

==== National Register of Historic Places listings ====
Port Morris Ferry Bridges

== Education ==
- South Bronx Charter School for International Cultures and the Arts (East 133rd Street and Cypress Pl)
- Per Scholas operates its main branch at 804 E 138th Street.

== Media ==
The Mott Haven Herald is a news outlet that reports in Mott Haven, Melrose and Port Morris. It is produced by students at the City University Graduate School of Journalism and edited by Joe Hirsch. The New York Post operated a printing plant in the neighborhood from 2001 to 2021.

== Transportation ==
The following New York City Subway stations serve Port Morris:

- Cypress Avenue (6 train)
- East 143rd Street–St. Mary's Street station (6 train)

The following MTA Regional Bus Operations bus routes serve Port Morris:

- Bx17: to Fordham Plaza via Crotona and Prospect Avenues
- Bx33: to 135th Street station (served by the 2 and 3 trains) via 138th Street
- M125: to The Hub or Manhattanville via Willis Avenue and 125th Street

Bruckner Boulevard, which runs under the Bruckner Expressway (Interstate 278), is the primary thoroughfare through Port Morris.

As part of a conceptualization by think tank ReThink Studio that was not recognized by the city or state, a train station in Port Morris will be the northern terminal for a trunk line that would be a regional hub for transportation to other places in the states of New York and Connecticut. The station's site and context could accommodate connections to Manhattan and LaGuardia Airport via the trunk line, Northeast Corridor, and local bus routes. The station, a planned adjacent convention center, and supporting development is proposed to encourage other growth in the South Bronx.
