= 2026 New York State Assembly election (districts 101–150) =

2026 New York Assembly election
- November 3, 2026

All 150 seats in the New York State Assembly 76 seats needed for a majority
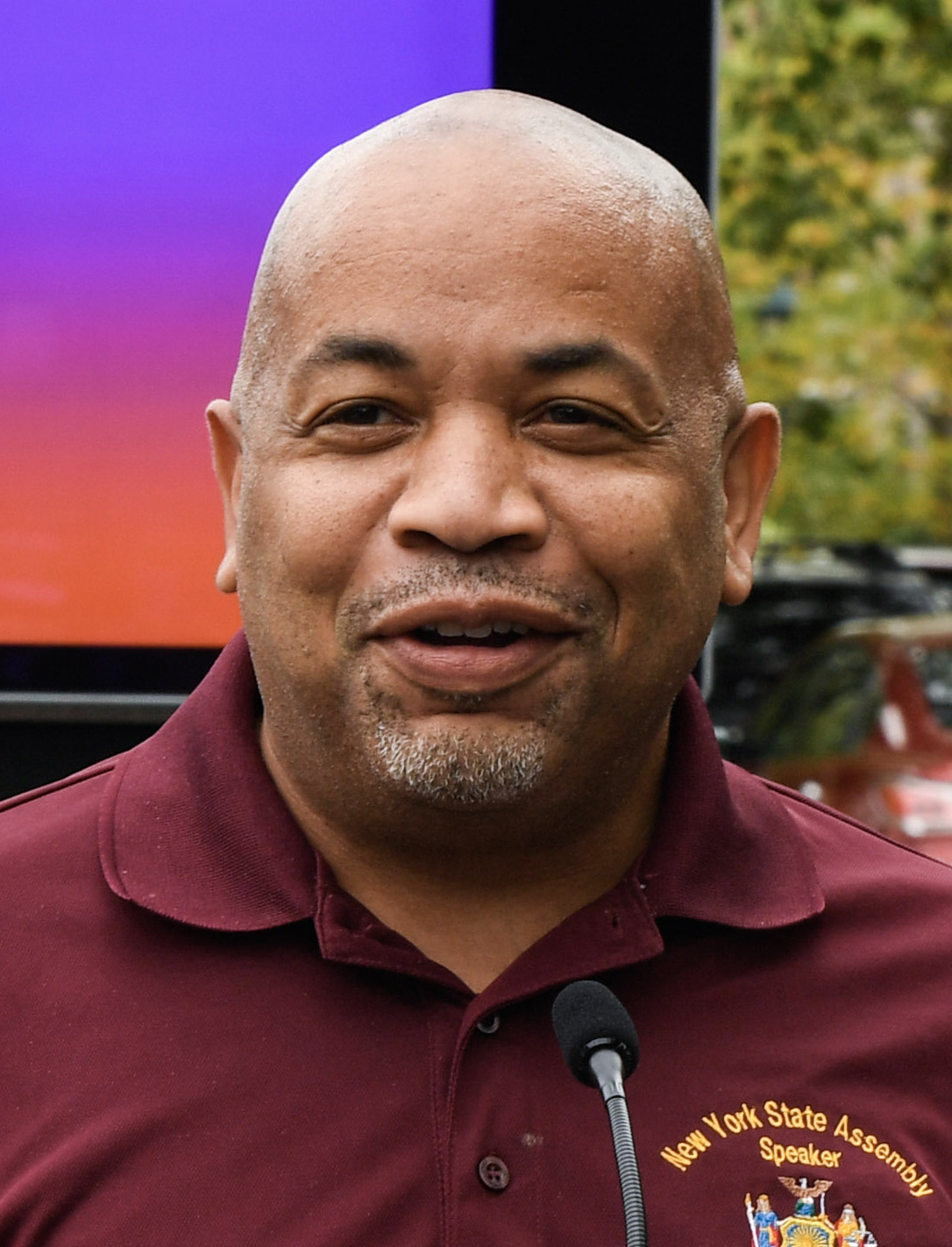

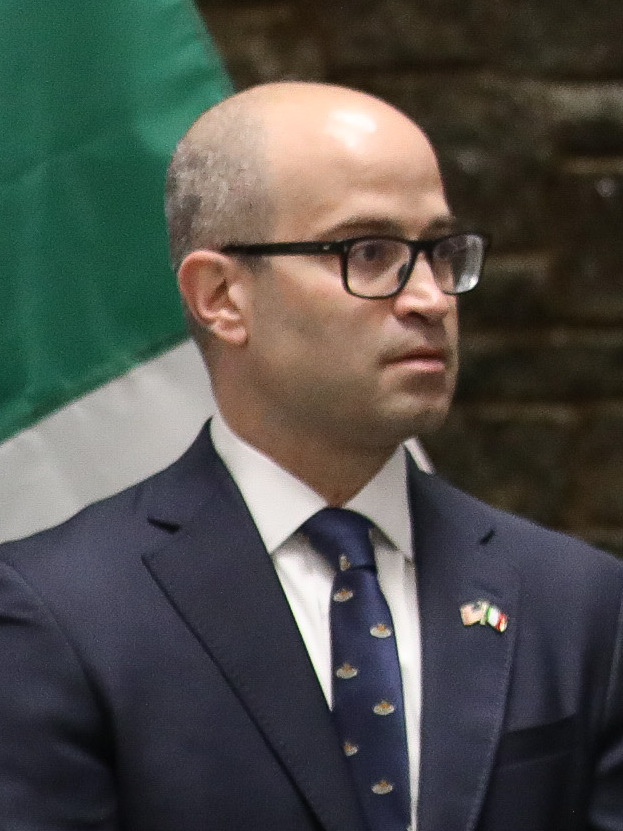
Leader	Carl Heastie	Ed Ra
Party	Democratic	Republican
Leader since	February 3, 2015	February 9, 2026
Leader's seat	83rd district	19th district
Last election	103 seats, 54.6%	47 seats, 37.0%
Current seats	103 seats	47 seats
Seats needed	Steady	▲29
- Democratic incumbent Democratic incumbent retiring or lost renomination Republican incumbent Republican incumbent retiring
Incumbent Speaker
Carl Heastie
Democratic

The 2026 New York State Assembly election was held on November 3, 2026. Primary elections were held on June 23, 2026. The Democratic Party has held a majority in the New York State Assembly since 1975. It was held alongside elections for governor, attorney general, comptroller, United States House of Representatives, and State Senate.

Candidates were required to file paperwork between March 30 and April 2, 2026, to run.

== District 101 ==
2026 New York's 101st State Assembly district election
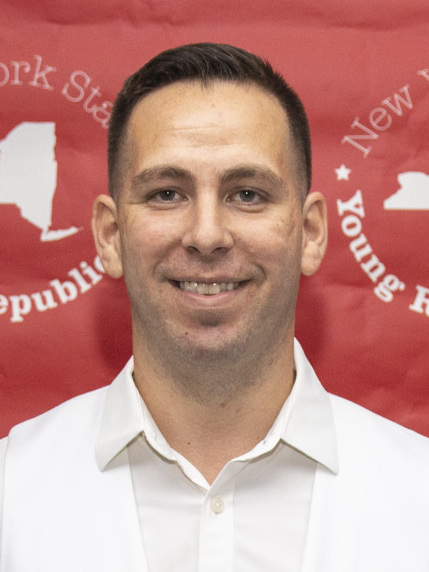
Nominee	Brian Maher
Party	Republican
Alliance	Conservative
Incumbent Assemblymember
Brian Maher
Republican

The 101st district is located within parts of Delaware, Orange, Sullivan, and Ulster counties, including the towns of Andes, Colchester, Hancock, and Middletown in Delaware County, the towns of Blooming Grove, Chester, Crawford, Goshen, Hamptonburgh, and Montgomery in Orange County, the towns of Fremont, Neversink and Rockland in Sullivan County, and the towns of Denning, Hardenburgh, Rochester, Shandaken, Shawangunk, and Wawarsing in Ulster County. The incumbent is Republican Brian Maher, who ran unopposed to win a second term with 99.05% of the vote in 2024.

=== Republican primary ===
==== Nominee ====
- Brian Maher, incumbent assemblymember

=== Third parties and independents ===
==== Declared ====
- Brian Maher (Conservative), incumbent assemblymember

=== General election ===
==== Predictions ====
Source	Ranking	As of
State Navigate	Uncontested R	November 2, 2026

==== Fundraising ====
Campaign finance reports as of October 19, 2026
Candidate	Contributions	Loans	Expenditures
Brian Maher (R)	$110,823.84	$0.00	$86,155.75
Source: Transparency USA

==== Results ====
2026 New York's 101st State Assembly district election
Party	Candidate	Votes	%	±%
Republican	Brian Maher			
Conservative	Brian Maher			
Total	Brian Maher (incumbent)			
Write-in				
Total votes				

== District 102 ==
2026 New York's 102nd State Assembly district election
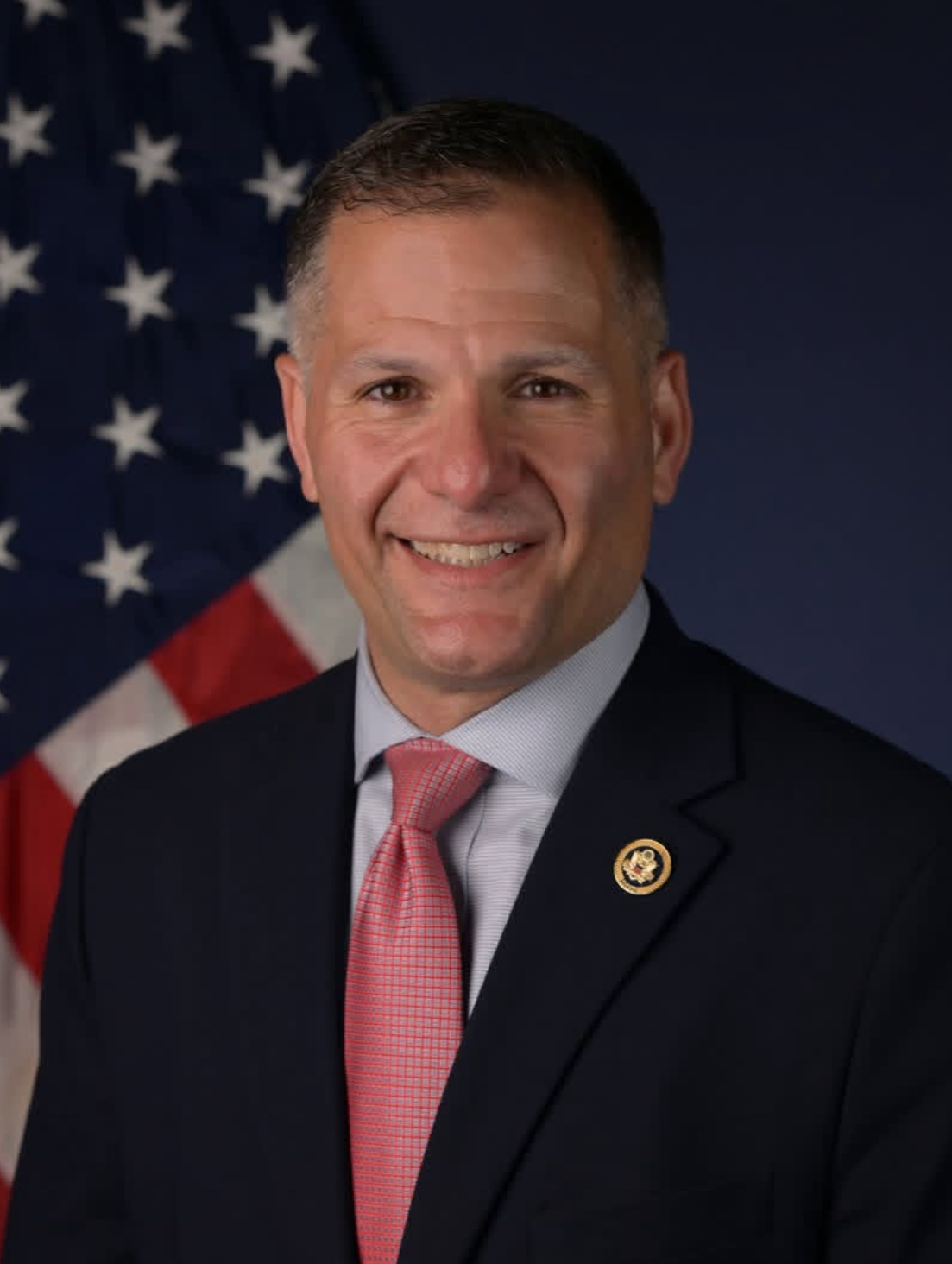

Nominee	Marc Molinaro	Janet S. Tweed
Party	Republican	Democratic
Alliance		Working Families
Incumbent Assemblymember
Christopher Tague
Republican

The 102nd district is located within Greene, Schoharie, and parts of Albany, Delaware, and Otsego counties, including the towns of Berne, Coeymans, Knox, Rensselaerville, Westerlo, and parts of Bethlehem in Albany County, the towns of Bovina, Davenport, Delhi, Franklin, Hamden, Harpersfield, Kortright, Meredith, Roxbury, Stamford, and Walton in Delaware County, and the towns of Cherry Valley, Decatur, Maryland, Middlefield, Otsego, Roseboom, Springfield, Westford, and Worcester in Otsego County. The incumbent is Republican Christopher Tague, who defeated Democrat Janet S. Tweed to win a fourth full term with 63.5% of the vote in 2024.

On November 26, 2025, Tague announced that he would run for the New York State Senate in the 51st district to succeed retiring three-term Republican incumbent Peter Oberacker, after Oberacker announced he would not run for a fourth term to instead run for the United States House of Representatives in New York's 19th congressional district to challenge one-term Democratic incumbent Josh Riley.

=== Republican primary ===
==== Nominee ====
- Marc Molinaro, administrator of the Federal Transit Administration (2025–2026), U.S. representative from New York's 19th congressional district (2023–2025), county executive of Dutchess County (2012–2023), state assemblymember from the 103rd district (2007–2011), and nominee for New York governor in 2018

==== Declined ====
- Christopher Tague, incumbent assemblymember (running for New York State Senate)

=== Democratic primary ===
==== Nominee ====
- Janet S. Tweed, nominee for this district in 2024

==== Eliminated in primary ====
- Thomas Boomhower, Catskill board of trustees member
- Mary T. Finneran, candidate for this district in 2024

==== Endorsements ====
Thomas Boomhower

Organizations

- Run for Something
Mary T. Finneran

Political parties

- New York Working Families Party

==== Fundraising ====
Campaign finance reports as of October 19, 2026
Candidate	Contributions	Loans	Expenditures
Janet S. Tweed (D)	$125,863.96	$0.00	$192,857.28
Thomas Boomhower (D)	$106,448.80	$5,000.00	$114,271.13
Mary T. Finneran (D)	$68,985.00	$0.00	$91,669.39
Source: Transparency USA

==== Results ====
2026 New York's 102nd State Assembly district Democratic primary election
Party	Candidate	Votes	%
Democratic	Janet S. Tweed	2,571	46.20%
Democratic	Thomas Boomhower	1,563	28.09%
Democratic	Mary T. Finneran	1,425	25.61%
Write-in		6	0.11%
Total votes		5,565	100.00%

=== Third parties and independents ===
==== Declared ====
- Janet S. Tweed (Working Families), nominee for this district in 2024

==== Withdrawn ====
- Mary T. Finneran (Working Families), Democratic candidate for this district in 2024

=== General election ===
==== Predictions ====
Source	Ranking	As of
State Navigate	Solid R	November 2, 2026

==== Post-primary endorsements ====
Janet S. Tweed

Political parties

- New York Working Families Party

==== Fundraising ====
Italics indicate a withdrawn candidate.

Campaign finance reports as of October 19, 2026
Candidate	Contributions	Loans	Expenditures
Marc Molinaro (R)	$79,435.63	$0.00	$92,935.99
Janet S. Tweed (D)	$125,863.96	$0.00	$192,857.28
Mary T. Finneran	$68,985.00	$0.00	$91,669.39
Source: Transparency USA

==== Results ====
2026 New York's 102nd State Assembly district election
Party	Candidate	Votes	%	±%
Republican	Marc Molinaro			
Democratic	Janet S. Tweed			
Working Families	Janet S. Tweed			
Total	Janet S. Tweed			
Write-in				
Total votes				

== District 103 ==
2026 New York's 103rd State Assembly district election
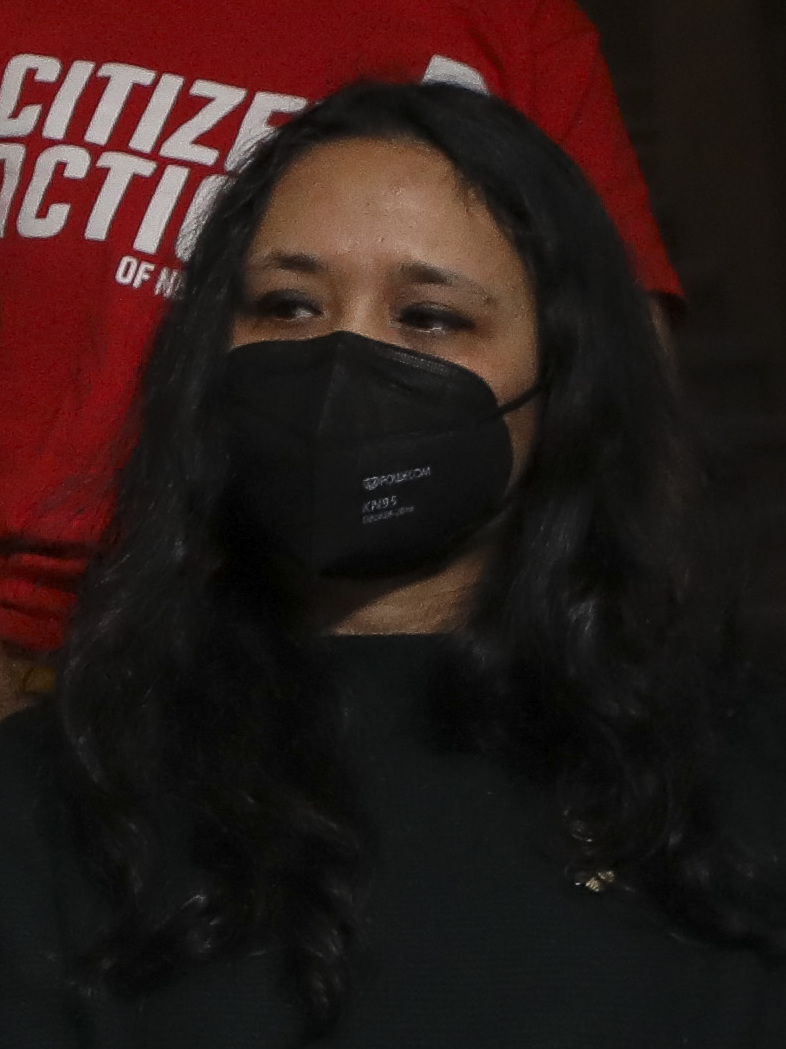

Nominee	Sarahana Shrestha	Santos M. Lopez
Party	Democratic	Republican
Alliance	Working Families	Conservative
Incumbent Assemblymember
Sarahana Shrestha
Democratic

The 103rd district is located within parts of Dutchess and Ulster counties, including the towns of Red Hook and Rhinebeck in Dutchess County, and the city of Kingston and the towns of Esopus, Gardiner, Hurley, Kingston, Marbletown, New Paltz, Olive, Rosendale, Saugerties, Ulster, and Woodstock in Ulster County. The incumbent is Democrat Sarahana Shrestha, who defeated Republican Jack Hayes to win a second term with 64.13% of the vote in 2024.

=== Democratic primary ===
==== Nominee ====
- Sarahana Shrestha, incumbent assemblymember

==== Endorsements ====
Sarahana Shrestha

Political parties

- New York Working Families Party

=== Republican primary ===
==== Nominee ====
- Santos M. Lopez, marketing director

=== Third parties and independents ===
==== Declared ====
- Santos M. Lopez (Conservative), marketing director
- Sarahana Shrestha (Working Families), incumbent assemblymember

=== General election ===
==== Predictions ====
Source	Ranking	As of
State Navigate	Solid D	November 2, 2026

==== Fundraising ====
Campaign finance reports as of October 19, 2026
Candidate	Contributions	Loans	Expenditures
Sarahana Shrestha (D)	$70,291.43	$0.00	$55,947.51
Santos M. Lopez (R)	$5,835.07	$0.00	$1,135.55
Source: Transparency USA

==== Results ====
2026 New York's 103rd State Assembly district election
Party	Candidate	Votes	%	±%
Democratic	Sarahana Shrestha			
Working Families	Sarahana Shrestha			
Total	Sarahana Shrestha (incumbent)			
Republican	Santos M. Lopez			
Conservative	Santos M. Lopez			
Total	Santos M. Lopez			
Write-in				
Total votes				

== District 104 ==
2026 New York's 104th State Assembly district election
Nominee	Jonathan Jacobson
Party	Democratic
Alliance	Working Families
Incumbent Assemblymember
Jonathan Jacobson
Democratic

The 104th district is located within parts of Dutchess, Orange, and Ulster counties, including the cities of Beacon and Poughkeepsie and parts of the town of Fishkill in Dutchess County, the city of Newburgh and the town of Newburgh in Orange County, and the towns of Lloyd, Marlborough, and Plattekill in Ulster County. The incumbent is Democrat Jonathan Jacobson, who ran unopposed to win a fourth term with 99.37% of the vote in 2024.

=== Democratic primary ===
==== Nominee ====
- Jonathan Jacobson, incumbent assemblymember

==== Disqualified ====
- Ali T. Muhammad

==== Endorsements ====
Jonathan Jacobson

Political parties

- New York Working Families Party

==== Fundraising ====
Italics indicate a disqualified candidate.

Campaign finance reports as of October 19, 2026
Candidate	Contributions	Loans	Expenditures
Jonathan Jacobson (D)	$75,832.30	$0.00	$19,658.34
Ali T. Muhammad	$0.00	$0.00	$0.00
Source: Transparency USA

=== Republican primary ===
==== Withdrawn ====
- Robert F. Johnson

=== Third parties and independents ===
==== Declared ====
- Jonathan Jacobson (Working Families), incumbent assemblymember

=== General election ===
==== Predictions ====
Source	Ranking	As of
State Navigate	Uncontested D	November 2, 2026

==== Fundraising ====
Italics indicate a withdrawn candidate.

Campaign finance reports as of October 19, 2026
Candidate	Contributions	Loans	Expenditures
Jonathan Jacobson (D)	$75,832.30	$0.00	$19,658.34
Robert F. Johnson	$0.00	$0.00	$0.00
Source: Transparency USA

==== Results ====
2026 New York's 104th State Assembly district election
Party	Candidate	Votes	%	±%
Democratic	Jonathan Jacobson			
Working Families	Jonathan Jacobson			
Total	Jonathan Jacobson (incumbent)			
Write-in				
Total votes				

== District 105 ==
2026 New York's 105th State Assembly district election
Nominee	Anil Beephan Jr.	Brooklyn Talarico
Party	Republican	Democratic
Alliance	Conservative
Incumbent Assemblymember
Anil Beephan Jr.
Republican

The 105th district is located entirely within Dutchess County, including the towns of Amenia, Beekman, Dover, East Fishkill, Fishkill, LaGrange, Pawling, Union Vale, and Wappinger. The incumbent is Republican Anil Beephan Jr., who ran unopposed to win a second term with 98.96% of the vote in 2024.

=== Republican primary ===
==== Nominee ====
- Anil Beephan Jr., incumbent assemblymember

=== Democratic primary ===
==== Nominee ====
- Brooklyn Talarico, social worker

=== Third parties and independents ===
==== Declared ====
- Anil Beephan Jr. (Conservative), incumbent assemblymember

=== General election ===
==== Predictions ====
Source	Ranking	As of
State Navigate	Solid R	November 2, 2026

==== Fundraising ====
Campaign finance reports as of October 19, 2026
Candidate	Contributions	Loans	Expenditures
Anil Beephan Jr. (R)	$167,830.28	$0.00	$142,023.65
Brooklyn Talarico (D)	$132,850.29	$0.00	$96,915.18
Source: Transparency USA

==== Results ====
2026 New York's 105th State Assembly district election
Party	Candidate	Votes	%	±%
Republican	Anil Beephan Jr.			
Conservative	Anil Beephan Jr.			
Total	Anil Beephan Jr. (incumbent)			
Democratic	Brooklyn Talarico			
Write-in				
Total votes				

== District 106 ==
2026 New York's 106th State Assembly district election
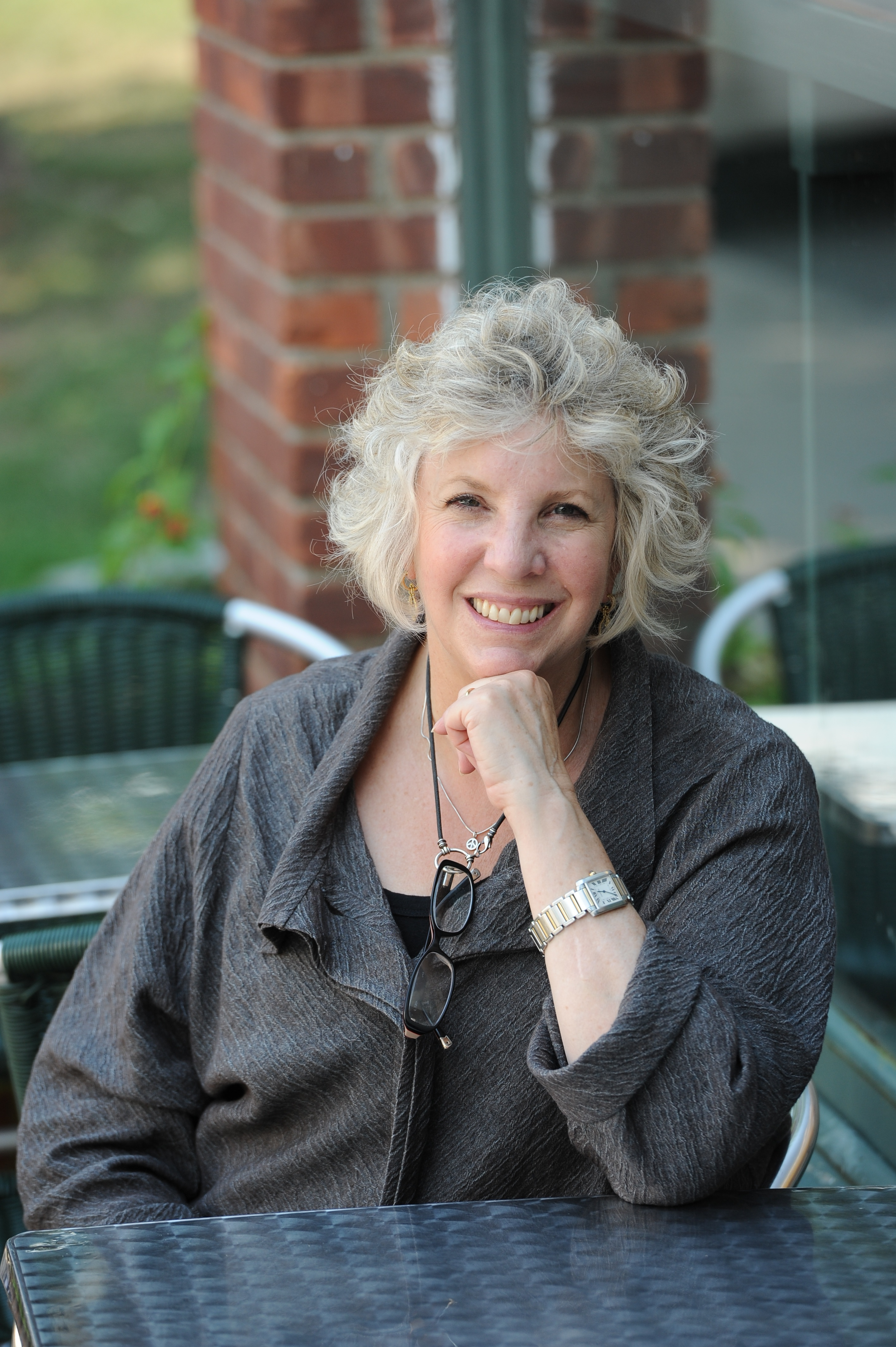

Nominee	Didi Barrett	Gregory A. Campus
Party	Democratic	Republican
Alliance		Conservative
Incumbent Assemblymember
Didi Barrett
Democratic

The 106th district is located within parts of Columbia and Dutchess counties, including the city of Hudson and the towns of Ancram, Austerlitz, Canaan, Claverack, Clermont, Copake, Gallatin, Germantown, Greenport, Hillsdale, Livingston, New Lebanon, Taghkanic, and parts of Chatham in Columbia County, and the towns of Clinton, Hyde Park, Milan, North East, Pine Plains, Pleasant Valley, Poughkeepsie, Stanford, and Washington in Dutchess County. The incumbent is Democrat Didi Barrett, who defeated Republican Stephan L. Krakower to win a seventh full term with 57.21% of the vote in 2024.

=== Democratic primary ===
==== Nominee ====
- Didi Barrett, incumbent assemblymember

==== Eliminated in primary ====
- Samuel Robert Hodge, chair of the Columbia County Democratic Committee

==== Fundraising ====
Campaign finance reports as of October 19, 2026
Candidate	Contributions	Loans	Expenditures
Didi Barrett (D)	$499,505.52	$0.00	$426,726.76
Samuel Robert Hodge (D)	$250,016.11	$0.00	$249,247.42
Source: Transparency USA

==== Results ====
2026 New York's 106th State Assembly district Democratic primary election
Party	Candidate	Votes	%
Democratic	Didi Barrett (incumbent)	6,486	72.96%
Democratic	Samuel Robert Hodge	2,398	26.97%
Write-in		6	0.07%
Total votes		8,890	100.00%

=== Republican primary ===
==== Nominee ====
- Gregory A. Campus, former law enforcement official

=== Third parties and independents ===
==== Declared ====
- Gregory A. Campus (Conservative), former law enforcement official

=== General election ===
==== Predictions ====
Source	Ranking	As of
State Navigate	Solid D	November 2, 2026

==== Fundraising ====
Campaign finance reports as of October 19, 2026
Candidate	Contributions	Loans	Expenditures
Didi Barrett (D)	$499,505.52	$0.00	$426,726.76
Gregory A. Campus (R)	$8,642.70	$7,100.00	$8,359.93
Source: Transparency USA

==== Results ====
2026 New York's 106th State Assembly district election
Party	Candidate	Votes	%	±%
Democratic	Didi Barrett (incumbent)			
Republican	Gregory A. Campus			
Conservative	Gregory A. Campus			
Total	Gregory A. Campus			
Write-in				
Total votes				

== District 107 ==
2026 New York's 107th State Assembly district election
Nominee	Scott Bendett	Chloe Pierce
Party	Republican	Democratic
Alliance	Conservative	Working Families
Incumbent Assemblymember
Scott Bendett
Republican

The 107th district is located within parts of Albany, Columbia, Rensselaer, and Washington counties, including parts of the town of Bethlehem in Albany County, the towns of Ghent, Kinderhook, Stockport, Stuyvesant, and parts of the town of Chatham in Columbia County, the towns of Berlin, Brunswick, Grafton, Hoosick, Nassau, Petersburgh, Pittstown, Poestenkill, Sand Lake, Schaghticoke, Schodack, and Stephentown in Rensselaer County, and the towns of Cambridge, Easton, and White Creek in Washington County. The incumbent is Republican Scott Bendett, who defeated Democrat Chloe Pierce to win a second term with 52.84% of the vote in 2024.

=== Republican primary ===
==== Nominee ====
- Scott Bendett, incumbent assemblymember

=== Democratic primary ===
==== Nominee ====
- Chloe Pierce, nominee for this district in 2024

==== Endorsements ====
Chloe Pierce

Organizations

- Run for Something

Political parties

- New York Working Families Party

=== Third parties and independents ===
==== Declared ====
- Scott Bendett (Conservative), incumbent assemblymember
- Chloe Pierce (Working Families), Democratic nominee for this district in 2024

=== General election ===
==== Predictions ====
Source	Ranking	As of
State Navigate	Lean D (flip)	November 2, 2026

==== Fundraising ====
Campaign finance reports as of October 19, 2026
Candidate	Contributions	Loans	Expenditures
Scott Bendett (R)	$220,363.89	$3,000.00	$177,131.70
Chloe E. Pierce (D)	$270,683.14	$0.00	$146,775.13
Source: Transparency USA

==== Results ====
2026 New York's 107th State Assembly district election
Party	Candidate	Votes	%	±%
Republican	Scott Bendett			
Conservative	Scott Bendett			
Total	Scott Bendett (incumbent)			
Democratic	Chloe Pierce			
Working Families	Chloe Pierce			
Total	Chloe Pierce			
Write-in				
Total votes				

== District 108 ==
2026 New York's 108th State Assembly district election
Nominee	John T. McDonald III	Joseph J. Adamo III
Party	Democratic	Republican
Incumbent Assemblymember
John T. McDonald III
Democratic

The 108th district is located within parts of Albany, Rensselaer, and Saratoga counties, including the cities of Cohoes and Watervliet and the town of Green Island in Albany County, the cities of Rensselaer and Troy and the towns of East Greenbush and North Greenbush in Rensselaer County, and the town of Waterford in Saratoga County. The incumbent is Democrat John T. McDonald III, who ran unopposed to win a seventh term with 98.81% of the vote in 2024.

=== Democratic primary ===
==== Nominee ====
- John T. McDonald III, incumbent assemblymember

=== Republican primary ===
==== Nominee ====
- Joseph J. Adamo III, emergency management official

=== Third parties and independents ===
==== Disqualified ====
- Joseph J. Adamo III (Conservative), emergency management official

=== General election ===
==== Predictions ====
Source	Ranking	As of
State Navigate	Solid D	November 2, 2026

==== Fundraising ====
Campaign finance reports as of October 19, 2026
Candidate	Contributions	Loans	Expenditures
John T. McDonald III (D)	$216,804.65	$0.00	$115,455.94
Joseph J. Adamo III (R)	$483.00	$0.00	$0.00
Source: Transparency USA

==== Results ====
2026 New York's 108th State Assembly district election
Party	Candidate	Votes	%	±%
Democratic	John T. McDonald III (incumbent)			
Republican	Joseph J. Adamo III			
Write-in				
Total votes				

== District 109 ==
2026 New York's 109th State Assembly district election
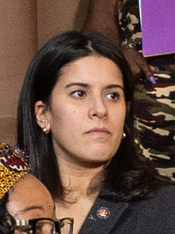
Nominee	Gabriella Romero
Party	Democratic
Alliance	Working Families
Incumbent Assemblymember
Gabriella Romero
Democratic

The 109th district is located entirely within Albany County, including the city of Albany, the town of New Scotland, and parts of the town of Guilderland. The incumbent is Democrat Gabriella Romero, who defeated Republican Alicia M. Purdy to succeed retiring six-term Democratic incumbent Patricia Fahy, who ran for the New York State Senate for the 46th district, with 72.1% of the vote in 2024.

=== Democratic primary ===
==== Nominee ====
- Gabriella Romero, incumbent assemblymember

==== Withdrawn ====
- Julia Long, nonprofit founder

==== Endorsements ====
Gabriella Romero

Political parties

- New York Working Families Party

==== Fundraising ====
Italics indicate a withdrawn candidate.

Campaign finance reports as of October 19, 2026
Candidate	Contributions	Loans	Expenditures
Gabriella Romero (D)	$119,328.77	$0.00	$132,175.48
Julia Long	$0.00	$0.00	$0.00
Source: Transparency USA

=== Third parties and independents ===
==== Declared ====
- Gabriella Romero (Working Families), incumbent assemblymember

=== General election ===
==== Predictions ====
Source	Ranking	As of
State Navigate	Uncontested D	November 2, 2026

==== Fundraising ====
Campaign finance reports as of October 19, 2026
Candidate	Contributions	Loans	Expenditures
Gabriella Romero (D)	$119,328.77	$0.00	$132,175.48
Source: Transparency USA

==== Results ====
2026 New York's 109th State Assembly district election
Party	Candidate	Votes	%	±%
Democratic	Gabriella Romero			
Working Families	Gabriella Romero			
Total	Gabriella Romero (incumbent)			
Write-in				
Total votes				

== District 110 ==
2026 New York's 110th State Assembly district election
Nominee	Phil Steck	Frank A. Mauriello
Party	Democratic	Republican
Alliance	Working Families	Conservative
Incumbent Assemblymember
Phil Steck
Democratic

The 110th district is located within parts of Albany and Schenectady counties, including the town of Colonie and parts of the town of Guilderland in Albany County, and the town of Niskayuna and parts of the city of Schenectady in Schenectady County. The incumbent is Democrat Phil Steck, who defeated Republican Jeff Madden to win a seventh term with 58.25% of the vote in 2024.

=== Democratic primary ===
==== Nominee ====
- Phil Steck, incumbent assemblymember

==== Endorsements ====
Phil Steck

Political parties

- New York Working Families Party

=== Republican primary ===
==== Nominee ====
- Frank A. Mauriello, minority leader of the Albany County Legislature

=== Third parties and independents ===
==== Declared ====
- Frank A. Mauriello (Conservative), minority leader of the Albany County Legislature
- Phil Steck (Working Families), incumbent assemblymember

=== General election ===
==== Predictions ====
Source	Ranking	As of
State Navigate	Solid D	November 2, 2026

==== Fundraising ====
Campaign finance reports as of October 19, 2026
Candidate	Contributions	Loans	Expenditures
Phil Steck (D)	$233,726.52	$0.00	$195,276.36
Frank A. Mauriello (R)	$196,154.00	$0.00	$155,125.66
Source: Transparency USA

==== Results ====
2026 New York's 110th State Assembly district election
Party	Candidate	Votes	%	±%
Democratic	Phil Steck			
Working Families	Phil Steck			
Total	Phil Steck (incumbent)			
Republican	Frank A. Mauriello			
Conservative	Frank A. Mauriello			
Total	Frank A. Mauriello			
Write-in				
Total votes				

== District 111 ==
2026 New York's 111th State Assembly district election
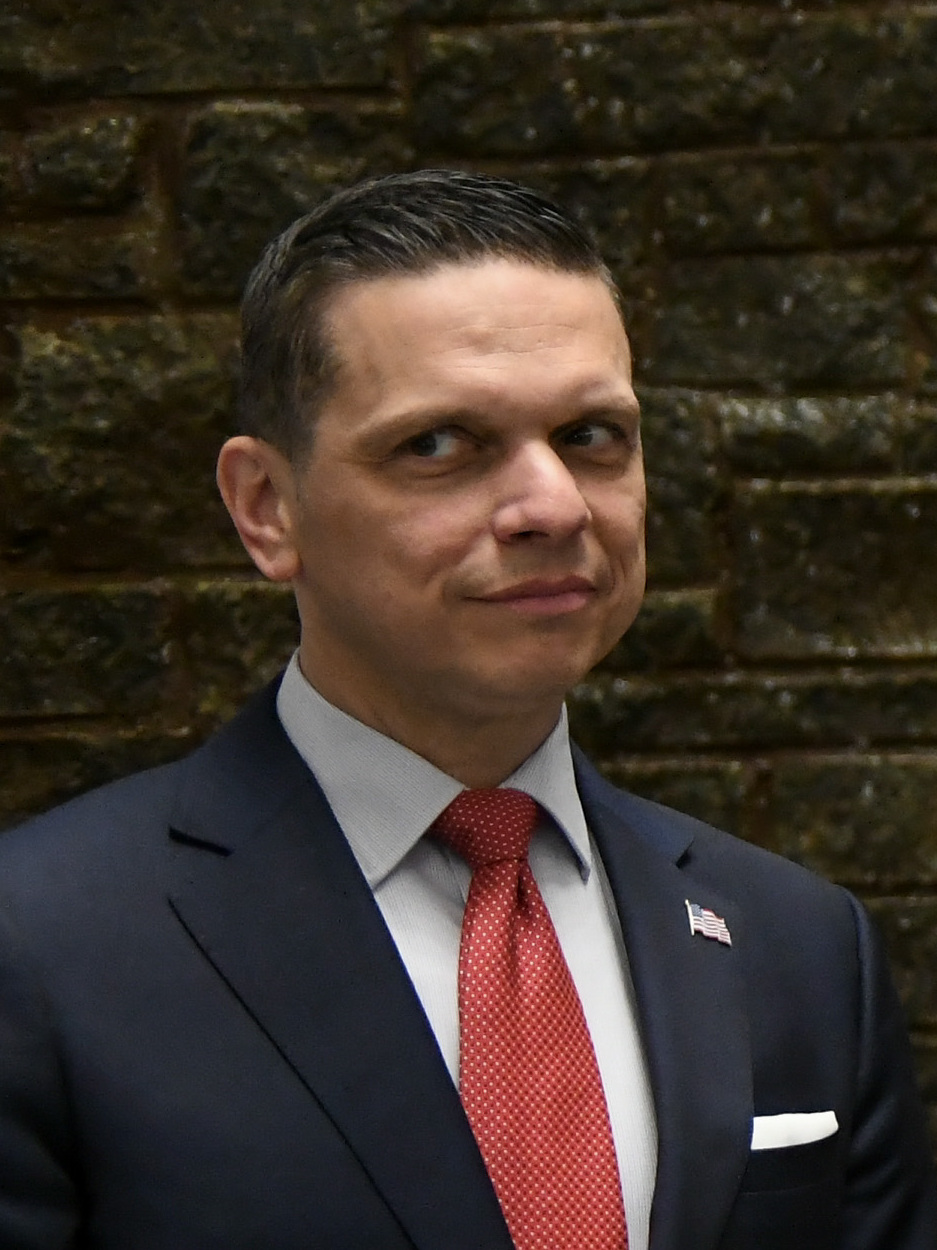

Nominee	Angelo Santabarbara	Nicholas J. Sokaris
Party	Democratic	Republican
Alliance	People First	Conservative
Incumbent Assemblymember
Angelo Santabarbara
Democratic

The 111th district is located within parts of Montgomery and Schenectady counties, including the city of Amsterdam and the towns of Amsterdam and Florida in Montgomery County, and the towns of Duanesburg, Princetown, and Rotterdam, and parts of the city of Schenectady and the town of Glenville in Schenectady County. The incumbent is Democrat Angelo Santabarbara, who defeated Republican Joseph C. Mastroianni to win a seventh term with 62.18% of the vote in 2024.

=== Democratic primary ===
==== Nominee ====
- Angelo Santabarbara, incumbent assemblymember

=== Republican primary ===
==== Nominee ====
- Nicholas J. Sokaris

=== Third parties and independents ===
==== Declared ====
- Nicholas J. Sokaris (Conservative)
- Angelo Santabarbara (People First), incumbent assemblymember

=== General election ===
==== Predictions ====
Source	Ranking	As of
State Navigate	Solid D	November 2, 2026

==== Fundraising ====
Campaign finance reports as of October 19, 2026
Candidate	Contributions	Loans	Expenditures
Angelo Santabarbara (D)	$83,840.00	$0.00	$77,511.42
Nicholas J. Sokaris (R)	$8,975.50	$0.00	$19,771.18
Source: Transparency USA

==== Results ====
2026 New York's 111th State Assembly district election
Party	Candidate	Votes	%	±%
Democratic	Angelo Santabarbara			
People First	Angelo Santabarbara			
Total	Angelo Santabarbara (incumbent)			
Republican	Nicholas J. Sokaris			
Conservative	Nicholas J. Sokaris			
Total	Nicholas J. Sokaris			
Write-in				
Total votes				

== District 112 ==
2026 New York's 112th State Assembly district election
Nominee	Mary Beth Walsh	Mario L. Fantini
Party	Republican	Democratic
Alliance	Conservative	Working Families
Incumbent Assemblymember
Mary Beth Walsh
Republican

The 112th district is located within parts of Fulton, Saratoga, and Schenectady counties, including the towns of Broadalbin and Perth in Fulton County, the towns of Ballston, Charlton, Clifton Park, Galway, Halfmoon, Milton, and Providence in Saratoga County, and parts of the town of Glenville in Schenectady County. The incumbent is Republican Mary Beth Walsh, who defeated Democrat Joe Seeman to win a seventh term with 58.84% of the vote in 2024.

=== Republican primary ===
==== Nominee ====
- Mary Beth Walsh, incumbent assemblymember

=== Third parties and independents ===
==== Declared ====
- Mary Beth Walsh (Conservative), incumbent assemblymember
- Mario L. Fantini (Working Families), Clifton Park councilmember

=== Democratic primary ===
==== Nominee ====
- Mario L. Fantini, Clifton Park councilmember

==== Endorsements ====
Mario L. Fantini

Political parties

- New York Working Families Party

=== General election ===
==== Predictions ====
Source	Ranking	As of
State Navigate	Likely R	November 2, 2026

==== Fundraising ====
Campaign finance reports as of October 19, 2026
Candidate	Contributions	Loans	Expenditures
Mary Beth Walsh (R)	$300,686.38	$0.00	$192,111.17
Mario L. Fantini (D)	$92,643.91	$2,000.00	$38,340.91
Source: Transparency USA

==== Results ====
2026 New York's 112th State Assembly district election
Party	Candidate	Votes	%	±%
Republican	Mary Beth Walsh			
Conservative	Mary Beth Walsh			
Total	Mary Beth Walsh (incumbent)			
Democratic	Mario L. Fantini			
Working Families	Mario L. Fantini			
Total	Mario L. Fantini			
Write-in				
Total votes				

== District 113 ==
2026 New York's 113th State Assembly district election
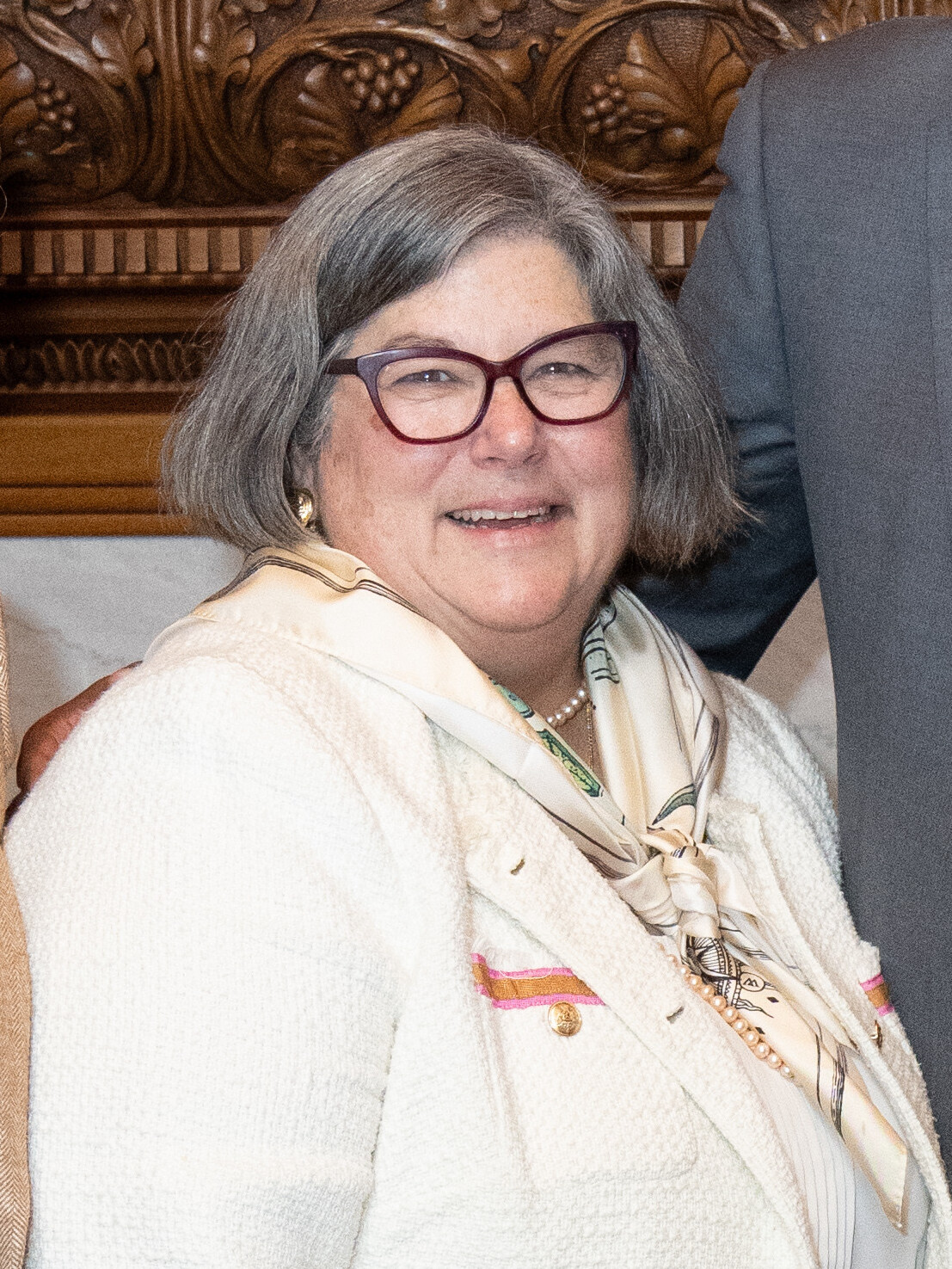

Nominee	Carrie Woerner	Allen M. Caruso	Thomas J. Kenny
Party	Democratic	Republican	Working Families
Alliance		Conservative; Vote Affordable	No Kings
Incumbent Assemblymember
Carrie Woerner
Democratic

The 113th district is located within parts of Saratoga, Warren, and Washington counties, including the cities of Mechanicville and Saratoga Springs and the towns of Malta, Moreau, Northumberland, Saratoga, Stillwater, and Wilton in Saratoga County, the city of Glens Falls in Warren County, and the towns of Fort Edward, Greenwich, and parts of the town of Kingsbury in Washington County. The incumbent is Democrat Carrie Woerner, who defeated Republican Jeremy Messina to win a sixth term with 54.85% of the vote in 2024.

=== Democratic primary ===
==== Nominee ====
- Carrie Woerner, incumbent assemblymember

=== Republican primary ===
==== Nominee ====
- Allen M. Caruso, small business owner

=== Third parties and independents ===
The Working Families Party has publicly disavowed Kenny's campaign, alleging that Kenny is a conservative spoiler candidate seeking to siphon votes from Democratic voters.

==== Declared ====
- Allen M. Caruso (Conservative/Vote Affordable), small business owner
- Thomas J. Kenny (Working Families/No Kings)

=== General election ===
==== Predictions ====
Source	Ranking	As of
State Navigate	Solid D	November 2, 2026

==== Fundraising ====
Campaign finance reports as of October 19, 2026
Candidate	Contributions	Loans	Expenditures
Carrie Woerner (D)	$0.00	$0.00	$0.00
Allen M. Caruso (R)	$225,480.46	$0.00	$217,519.70
Thomas J. Kenny (WF)	$0.00	$0.00	$0.00
Source: Transparency USA

==== Results ====
2026 New York's 113th State Assembly district election
Party	Candidate	Votes	%	±%
Democratic	Carrie Woerner (incumbent)			
Republican	Allen M. Caruso			
Conservative	Allen M. Caruso			
Vote Affordable	Allen M. Caruso			
Total	Allen M. Caruso			
Working Families	Thomas J. Kenny			
No Kings	Thomas J. Kenny			
Total	Thomas J. Kenny			
Write-in				
Total votes				

== District 114 ==
2026 New York's 114th State Assembly district election
Nominee	Matt Simpson	John Gunther
Party	Republican	Democratic
Alliance	Conservative	Working Families
Incumbent Assemblymember
Matt Simpson
Republican

The 114th district is located within parts of Essex, Fulton, Saratoga, Warren, and Washington counties, including the towns of Chesterfield, Crown Point, Elizabethtown, Essex, Lewis, Minerva, Moriah, Newcomb, North Hudson, Schroon, Ticonderoga, Westport, and Willsboro in Essex County, the town of Northampton in Fulton County, the towns of Corinth, Day, Edinburg, Greenfield, and Hadley in Saratoga County, the towns of Bolton, Chester, Hague, Horicon, Johnsburg, Lake George, Lake Luzerne, Queensbury, Stony Creek, Thurman, and Warrensburg in Warren County, and the towns of Argyle, Dresden, Fort Ann, Granville, Hampton, Hartford, Hebron, Jackson, Putnam, Salem, Whitehall, and parts of the town of Kingsbury in Washington County. The incumbent is Republican Matt Simpson, who ran unopposed to win a third term with 99.24% of the vote in 2024.

=== Republican primary ===
==== Nominee ====
- Matt Simpson, incumbent assemblymember

=== Democratic primary ===
==== Nominee ====
- John Gunther, businessman

==== Endorsements ====
John Gunther

Political parties

- New York Working Families Party

=== Third parties and independents ===
==== Declared ====
- Matt Simpson (Conservative), incumbent assemblymember
- John Gunther (Working Families), businessman

=== General election ===
==== Predictions ====
Source	Ranking	As of
State Navigate	Solid R	November 2, 2026

==== Fundraising ====
Campaign finance reports as of October 19, 2026
Candidate	Contributions	Loans	Expenditures
Matt Simpson (R)	$102,155.00	$0.00	$85,081.76
John Gunther (D)	$93,982.91	$9,000.00	$43,301.78
Source: Transparency USA

==== Results ====
2026 New York's 114th State Assembly district election
Party	Candidate	Votes	%	±%
Republican	Matt Simpson			
Conservative	Matt Simpson			
Total	Matt Simpson (incumbent)			
Democratic	John Gunther			
Working Families	John Gunther			
Total	John Gunther			
Write-in				
Total votes				

== District 115 ==
2026 New York's 115th State Assembly district election
Nominee	Michael Cashman
Party	Democratic
Alliance	Working Families
Incumbent Assemblymember
Michael Cashman
Democratic

The 115th district is located within Clinton, Franklin, and parts of Essex counties, including the towns of Jay, Keene, North Elba, St. Armand, and Wilmington in Essex County. The incumbent is Democrat Michael Cashman, who defeated Brent M. Davison to fill the vacancy of three-full-term Democrat Billy Jones with 52.28% of the vote in 2025.

In 2024, incumbent Democratic assemblyman Billy Jones ran unopposed to win a fourth term with 99.39% of the vote. On August 29, 2025, Jones resigned from the State Assembly to accept a position leading Clinton Community College's Institute for Advanced Manufacturing. On November 4, Democratic Plattsburgh town supervisor Michael Cashman won the special election with 52.28% of the vote against Republican Brent M. Davison to succeed Jones. Cashman was sworn in on November 13.

=== Democratic primary ===
==== Nominee ====
- Michael Cashman, incumbent assemblymember

==== Endorsements ====
Michael Cashman

Political parties

- New York Working Families Party

=== Third parties and independents ===
==== Declared ====
- Michael Cashman (Working Families), incumbent assemblymember

=== General election ===
==== Predictions ====
Source	Ranking	As of
State Navigate	Uncontested D	November 2, 2026

==== Fundraising ====
Campaign finance reports as of October 19, 2026
Candidate	Contributions	Loans	Expenditures
Michael Cashman (D)	$420,195.50	$0.00	$369,786.38
Source: Transparency USA

==== Results ====
2026 New York's 115th State Assembly district election
Party	Candidate	Votes	%	±%
Democratic	Michael Cashman			
Working Families	Michael Cashman			
Total	Michael Cashman (incumbent)			
Write-in				
Total votes				

== District 116 ==
2026 New York's 116th State Assembly district election
Nominee	Scott Gray
Party	Republican
Alliance	Conservative
Incumbent Assemblymember
Scott Gray
Republican

The 116th district is located within parts of Jefferson and St. Lawrence counties, including the city of Watertown and the towns of Alexandria, Antwerp, Brownville, Cape Vincent, Clayton, Henderson, Hounsfield, Lyme, Orleans, Pamelia, Philadelphia, Theresa, and Watertown in Jefferson County, and the city of Ogdensburg and the towns of Canton, De Peyster, Hammond, Lisbon, Louisville, Macomb, Madrid, Massena, Morristown, Oswegatchie, Potsdam, Rossie, and Waddington in St. Lawrence County. The incumbent is Republican Scott Gray, who ran unopposed to win a second term with 99.28% of the vote in 2024.

=== Republican primary ===
==== Nominee ====
- Scott Gray, incumbent assemblymember

=== Third parties and independents ===
==== Declared ====
- Scott Gray (Conservative), incumbent assemblymember

=== General election ===
==== Predictions ====
Source	Ranking	As of
State Navigate	Uncontested R	November 2, 2026

==== Fundraising ====
Campaign finance reports as of October 19, 2026
Candidate	Contributions	Loans	Expenditures
Scott Gray (R)	$32,204.70	$0.00	$38,764.63
Source: Transparency USA

==== Results ====
2026 New York's 116th State Assembly district election
Party	Candidate	Votes	%	±%
Republican	Scott Gray			
Conservative	Scott Gray			
Total	Scott Gray (incumbent)			
Write-in				
Total votes				

== District 117 ==
2026 New York's 117th State Assembly district election
Nominee	Tammie Nabywaniec	Dennis Gordon
Party	Republican	Democratic
Alliance	Conservative	Working Families
Incumbent Assemblymember
Ken Blankenbush
Republican

The 117th district is located within Lewis and parts of Jefferson, Oneida, and St. Lawrence counties, including the towns of Champion, Le Ray, Rodman, Rutland, and Wilna in Jefferson County, the towns of Annsville, Ava, Boonville, Camden, Florence, Forestport, Lee, and Vienna in Oneida County, and the towns of Brasher, Clare, Clifton, Colton, De Kalb, Edwards, Fine, Fowler, Gouverneur, Hermon, Hopkinton, Lawrence, Norfolk, Parishville, Piercefield, Pierrepont, Pitcairn, Russell, and Stockholm in St. Lawrence County. The incumbent is Republican Ken Blankenbush, who ran unopposed to win an eighth term with 99.63% of the vote in 2024.

On December 18, 2025, Blankenbush announced he would not run for re-election to a ninth term.

=== Republican primary ===
==== Nominee ====
- Tammie Nabywaniec, chief of staff for state assemblymember Ken Blankenbush

==== Withdrawn ====
- Lonny Koons

==== Declined ====
- Ken Blankenbush, incumbent assemblymember

==== Fundraising ====
Italics indicate a withdrawn candidate.

Campaign finance reports as of October 19, 2026
Candidate	Contributions	Loans	Expenditures
Tammie Nabywaniec (R)	$117,624.23	$30,000.00	$113,274.88
Lonny Koons	$0.00	$0.00	$0.00
Source: Transparency USA

=== Democratic primary ===
==== Nominee ====
- Dennis Gordon

==== Endorsements ====
Dennis Gordon

Political parties

- New York Working Families Party

=== Third parties and independents ===
==== Declared ====
- Tammie Nabywaniec (Conservative), chief of staff for state assemblymember Ken Blankenbush
- Dennis Gordon (Working Families)

=== General election ===
==== Predictions ====
Source	Ranking	As of
State Navigate	Solid R	November 2, 2026

==== Fundraising ====
Campaign finance reports as of October 19, 2026
Candidate	Contributions	Loans	Expenditures
Tammie Nabywaniec (R)	$117,624.23	$30,000.00	$113,274.88
Dennis Gordon (D)	$55,616.37	$0.00	$47,433.54
Source: Transparency USA

==== Results ====
2026 New York's 117th State Assembly district election
Party	Candidate	Votes	%	±%
Republican	Tammie Nabywaniec			
Conservative	Tammie Nabywaniec			
Total	Tammie Nabywaniec			
Democratic	Dennis Gordon			
Working Families	Dennis Gordon			
Total	Dennis Gordon			
Write-in				
Total votes				

== District 118 ==
2026 New York's 118th State Assembly district election
Nominee	Heather A. Scribner	Colleen Maxwell
Party	Republican	Democratic
Alliance	Conservative
Incumbent Assemblymember
Robert Smullen
Republican

The 118th district is located within Hamilton and parts of Fulton, Herkimer, Montgomery, Oneida, and Otsego counties, including the cities of Gloversville and Johnstown and the towns of Bleecker, Caroga, Ephratah, Johnstown, Mayfield, Oppenheim, and Stratford in Fulton County, the city of Little Falls and the towns of Columbia, Danube, Fairfield, Frankfort, German Flatts, Herkimer, Little Falls, Manheim, Newport, Norway, Ohio, Russia, Salisbury, Schuyler, Stark, Warren, and Webb in Herkimer County, the towns of Canajoharie, Charleston, Glen, Minden, Mohawk, Palatine, Root, and St. Johnsville in Montgomery County, the towns of Remsen, Steuben, Trenton, and Western in Oneida County, and the town of Richfield in Otsego County. The incumbent is Republican Robert Smullen, who ran unopposed to win a fourth term with 99.15% of the vote in 2024.

On November 20, 2025, Smullen announced that he would run for the United States House of Representatives in New York's 21st congressional district to succeed retiring six-term Republican incumbent Elise Stefanik.

=== Republican primary ===
==== Nominee ====
- Heather A. Scribner, treasurer of Fulton County

==== Eliminated in primary ====
- Chanda King, wife of former mayor of Gloversville Dayton King
- Charles C. Potter, supervisor of Fulton County

==== Declined ====
- Robert Smullen, incumbent assemblymember (running for the United States House of Representatives)

==== Fundraising ====
Campaign finance reports as of October 19, 2026
Candidate	Contributions	Loans	Expenditures
Heather A. Scribner (R)	$107,837.03	$3,100.00	$96,557.17
Charles C. Potter (R)	$131,225.54	$1,448.02	$133,492.14
Chanda King (R)	$53,837.50	$0.00	$50,877.57
Source: Transparency USA

==== Results ====
2026 New York's 118th State Assembly district Republican primary election
Party	Candidate	Votes	%
Republican	Heather A. Scribner	4,383	39.98%
Republican	Charles C. Potter	3,710	33.84%
Republican	Chanda King	2,849	25.99%
Write-in		20	0.18%
Total votes		10,962	100.00%

=== Democratic primary ===
==== Nominee ====
- Colleen Maxwell

=== Third parties and independents ===
==== Declared ====
- Heather A. Scribner (Conservative), treasurer of Fulton County (originally withdrew)

==== Withdrawn ====
- Charles C. Potter (Conservative), supervisor of Fulton County

==== Fundraising ====
Italics indicate a withdrawn candidate.

Campaign finance reports as of October 19, 2026
Candidate	Contributions	Loans	Expenditures
Heather A. Scribner (C)	$107,837.03	$3,100.00	$96,557.17
Charles C. Potter	$131,225.54	$1,448.02	$133,492.14
Source: Transparency USA

=== General election ===
==== Predictions ====
Source	Ranking	As of
State Navigate	Solid R	November 2, 2026

==== Fundraising ====
Campaign finance reports as of October 19, 2026
Candidate	Contributions	Loans	Expenditures
Heather A. Scribner (R)	$107,837.03	$3,100.00	$96,557.17
Colleen Maxwell (D)	$11,037.12	$0.00	$9,488.42
Source: Transparency USA

==== Results ====
2026 New York's 118th State Assembly district election
Party	Candidate	Votes	%	±%
Republican	Heather A. Scribner			
Conservative	Heather A. Scribner			
Total	Heather A. Scribner			
Democratic	Colleen Maxwell			
Write-in				
Total votes				

== District 119 ==
2026 New York's 119th State Assembly district election
Nominee	Jonathan E. Lipe	Michael C. Gentile
Party	Democratic	Republican
Alliance	Working Families; Mohawk Valley 1st	Conservative
Incumbent Assemblymember
Marianne Buttenschon
Democratic

The 119th district is located entirely within Oneida County, including the cities of Rome and Utica and the towns of Deerfield, Floyd, Marcy, and Whitestown. The incumbent is Democrat Marianne Buttenschon, who defeated Republican Christine Esposito to win a fourth term with 50.74% of the vote in 2024.

On January 13, 2026, Buttenschon announced she would not run for re-election to a fifth term.

=== Democratic primary ===
==== Nominee ====
- Jonathan E. Lipe, congressional aide

==== Eliminated in primary ====
- Joseph M. Betar, Utica city councilman

==== Declined ====
- Marianne Buttenschon, incumbent assemblymember

==== Endorsements ====
Jonathan E. Lipe

Political parties

- New York Working Families Party

==== Fundraising ====
Campaign finance reports as of October 19, 2026
Candidate	Contributions	Loans	Expenditures
Jonathan E. Lipe (D)	$379,469.02	$0.00	$362,669.96
Joseph M. Betar (D)	$135,045.40	$5,900.00	$131,583.39
Source: Transparency USA

==== Results ====
2026 New York's 119th State Assembly district Democratic primary election
Party	Candidate	Votes	%
Democratic	Jonathan E. Lipe	1,735	54.41%
Democratic	Joseph M. Betar	1,454	45.59%
Total votes		3,189	100.00%

=== Republican primary ===
==== Nominee ====
- Michael C. Gentile, former Oneida County legislator and Serve America Movement nominee for this district in 2020

==== Eliminated in primary ====
- Daniel Fusco, Deerfield town board member

==== Fundraising ====
Campaign finance reports as of October 19, 2026
Candidate	Contributions	Loans	Expenditures
Michael C. Gentile (R)	$160,481.60	$40,000.00	$191,895.90
Daniel Fusco (R)	$75,575.07	$0.00	$77,199.87
Source: Transparency USA

==== Results ====
2026 New York's 119th State Assembly district Republican primary election
Party	Candidate	Votes	%
Republican	Michael C. Gentile	1,895	51.54%
Republican	Daniel Fusco	1,778	48.35%
Write-in		4	0.11%
Total votes		3,677	100.00%

=== Third parties and independents ===
==== Declared ====
- Michael C. Gentile (Conservative), former Oneida County legislator and Serve America Movement nominee for this district in 2020
- Jonathan E. Lipe (Working Families/Mohawk Valley 1st), congressional aide

==== Withdrawn ====
- Daniel Fusco (Conservative), Deerfield town board member

==== Fundraising ====
Italics indicate a withdrawn candidate.

Campaign finance reports as of October 19, 2026
Candidate	Contributions	Loans	Expenditures
Michael C. Gentile (C)	$160,481.60	$40,000.00	$191,895.90
Daniel Fusco	$75,575.07	$0.00	$77,199.87
Source: Transparency USA

=== General election ===
==== Predictions ====
Source	Ranking	As of
State Navigate	Tilt R (flip)	November 2, 2026

==== Fundraising ====
Campaign finance reports as of October 19, 2026
Candidate	Contributions	Loans	Expenditures
Jonathan E. Lipe (D)	$379,469.02	$0.00	$362,669.96
Michael C. Gentile (R)	$160,481.60	$40,000.00	$191,895.90
Source: Transparency USA

==== Results ====
2026 New York's 119th State Assembly district election
Party	Candidate	Votes	%	±%
Democratic	Jonathan E. Lipe			
Working Families	Jonathan E. Lipe			
Mohawk Valley 1st	Jonathan E. Lipe			
Total	Jonathan E. Lipe			
Republican	Michael C. Gentile			
Conservative	Michael C. Gentile			
Total	Michael C. Gentile			
Write-in				
Total votes				

== District 120 ==
2026 New York's 120th State Assembly district election
Nominee	Jim Weatherup	Timothy C. Allers
Party	Republican	Democratic
Alliance	Conservative
Incumbent Assemblymember
William A. Barclay
Republican

The 120th district is located within Oswego and parts of Cayuga and Jefferson counties, including the towns of Ira, Sterling, and Victory in Cayuga County, and the towns of Adams, Ellisburg, Lorraine, and Worth in Jefferson County. The incumbent is Republican William A. Barclay, who ran unopposed to win a twelfth term with 98.8% of the vote in 2024.

On February 5, 2026, Barclay announced he would not run for re-election to a thirteenth term.

=== Republican primary ===
==== Nominee ====
- Jim Weatherup, chairman of the Oswego County legislature

==== Declined ====
- William A. Barclay, incumbent assemblymember

=== Democratic primary ===
==== Nominee ====
- Timothy C. Allers, small business owner

==== Eliminated in primary ====
- James Paul Cannon, nurse

==== Fundraising ====
Campaign finance reports as of October 19, 2026
Candidate	Contributions	Loans	Expenditures
Timothy C. Allers (D)	$15,486.20	$14,650.00	$115,848.56
James Paul Cannon (D)	$3,903.00	$0.00	$3,376.43
Source: Transparency USA

==== Results ====
2026 New York's 120th State Assembly district Democratic primary election
Party	Candidate	Votes	%
Democratic	Timothy C. Allers	1,116	50.59%
Democratic	James Paul Cannon	1,088	49.32%
Write-in		2	0.09%
Total votes		2,206	100.00%

=== Third parties and independents ===
==== Declared ====
- Jim Weatherup (Conservative), chairman of the Oswego County legislature

=== General election ===
==== Predictions ====
Source	Ranking	As of
State Navigate	Solid R	November 2, 2026

==== Fundraising ====
Campaign finance reports as of October 19, 2026
Candidate	Contributions	Loans	Expenditures
Jim Weatherup (R)	$230,230.47	$0.00	$124,258.97
Timothy C. Allers (D)	$15,486.20	$14,650.00	$115,848.56
Source: Transparency USA

==== Results ====
2026 New York's 120th State Assembly district election
Party	Candidate	Votes	%	±%
Republican	Jim Weatherup			
Conservative	Jim Weatherup			
Total	Jim Weatherup			
Democratic	Timothy C. Allers			
Write-in				
Total votes				

== District 121 ==
2026 New York's 121st State Assembly district election
Nominee	Joe Angelino	Vicki Davis
Party	Republican	Democratic
Alliance	Conservative
Incumbent Assemblymember
Joe Angelino
Republican

The 121st district is located within parts of Broome, Chenango, Delaware, Madison, and Otsego counties, including the towns of Binghamton, Chenango, Colesville, Conklin, Dickinson, Fenton, Kirkwood, Sanford, and Windsor in Broome County, the city of Norwich and the towns of Afton, Bainbridge, Columbus, Coventry, Greene, Guilford, New Berlin, North Norwich, Norwich, Oxford, Plymouth, Preston, Sherburne, and Smyrna in Chenango County, the towns of Deposit, Masonville, Sidney, and Tompkins in Delaware County, the towns of Brookfield, Eaton, Hamilton, Lebanon, and Madison in Madison County, and the towns of Butternuts, Edmeston, Morris, Otego, Pittsfield, and Unadilla in Otsego County. The incumbent is Republican Joe Angelino, who defeated Democrat Vicki Davis to win a third term with 67.46% of the vote in 2024.

=== Republican primary ===
==== Nominee ====
- Joe Angelino, incumbent assemblymember

=== Democratic primary ===
==== Nominee ====
- Vicki Davis, business owner and nominee for this district in 2024

=== Third parties and independents ===
==== Declared ====
- Joe Angelino (Conservative), incumbent assemblymember

=== General election ===
==== Predictions ====
Source	Ranking	As of
State Navigate	Solid R	November 2, 2026

==== Fundraising ====
Campaign finance reports as of October 19, 2026
Candidate	Contributions	Loans	Expenditures
Joe Angelino (R)	$55,517.74	$100,000.00	$113,342.52
Vicki Davis (D)	$92,131.88	$0.00	$98,463.97
Source: Transparency USA

==== Results ====
2026 New York's 121st State Assembly district election
Party	Candidate	Votes	%	±%
Republican	Joe Angelino			
Conservative	Joe Angelino			
Total	Joe Angelino (incumbent)			
Democratic	Vicki Davis			
Write-in				
Total votes				

== District 122 ==
2026 New York's 122nd State Assembly district election
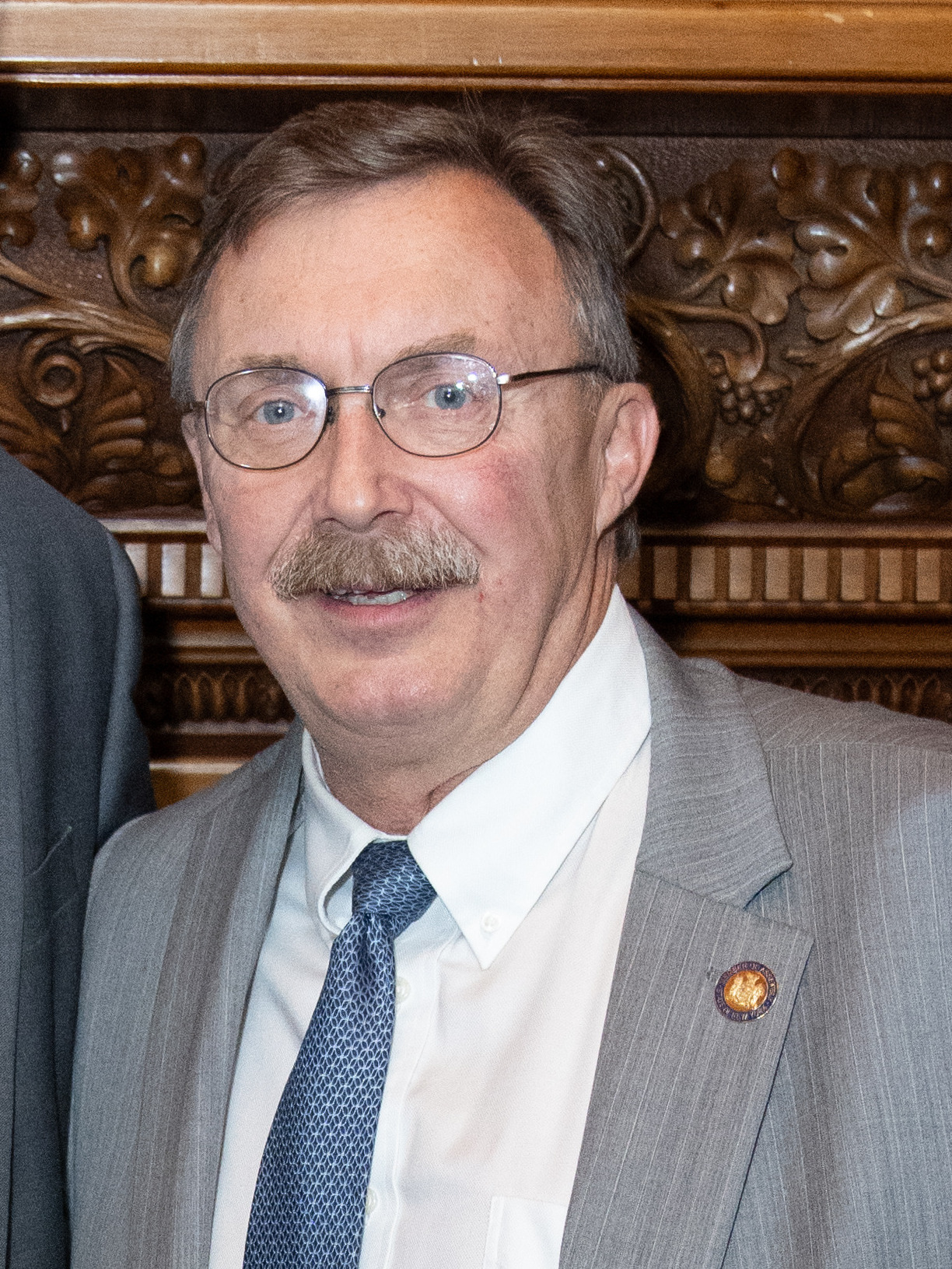

Nominee	Brian Miller	Ihor Semko
Party	Republican	Democratic
Alliance	Conservative	Working Families
Incumbent Assemblymember
Brian Miller
Republican

The 122nd district is located within parts of Herkimer, Madison, Oneida, and Otsego counties, including the towns of Litchfield and Winfield in Herkimer County, the city of Oneida and the towns of Fenner, Lenox, Lincoln, Smithfield, Stockbridge, and Sullivan in Madison County, the city of Sherrill and the towns of Augusta, Bridgewater, Kirkland, Marshall, New Hartford, Paris, Sangerfield, Vernon, Verona, and Westmoreland in Oneida County, and the city of Oneonta and the towns of Burlington, Exeter, Hartwick, Laurens, Milford, New Lisbon, Oneonta, and Plainfield in Otsego County. The incumbent is Republican Brian Miller, who defeated Democrat Adrienne Martini to win a fifth term with 62.84% of the vote in 2024.

=== Republican primary ===
==== Nominee ====
- Brian Miller, incumbent assemblymember

==== Disqualified ====
- Anthony L. Micaroni, manufacturing engineer

==== Fundraising ====
Italics indicate a disqualified candidate.

Campaign finance reports as of October 19, 2026
Candidate	Contributions	Loans	Expenditures
Brian Miller (R)	$103,401.48	$0.00	$75,837.74
Anthony L. Micaroni	$3,638.42	$0.00	$1,699.53
Source: Transparency USA

=== Democratic primary ===
==== Nominee ====
- Ihor Semko

==== Endorsements ====
Ihor Semko

Political parties

- New York Working Families Party

=== Third parties and independents ===
==== Declared ====
- Brian Miller (Conservative), incumbent assemblymember
- Ihor Semko (Working Families)

=== General election ===
==== Predictions ====
Source	Ranking	As of
State Navigate	Solid R	November 2, 2026

==== Fundraising ====
Campaign finance reports as of October 19, 2026
Candidate	Contributions	Loans	Expenditures
Brian Miller (R)	$103,401.48	$0.00	$75,837.74
Ihor Semko (D)	$11,259.72	$0.00	$62,077.34
Source: Transparency USA

==== Results ====
2026 New York's 122nd State Assembly district election
Party	Candidate	Votes	%	±%
Republican	Brian Miller			
Conservative	Brian Miller			
Total	Brian Miller (incumbent)			
Democratic	Ihor Semko			
Working Families	Ihor Semko			
Total	Ihor Semko			
Write-in				
Total votes				

== District 123 ==
2026 New York's 123rd State Assembly district election
Nominee	Daniel Norton	Lynn E. Parker	Heather L. Micha
Party	Democratic	Republican	Coalition
Alliance		Conservative
Incumbent Assemblymember
Donna Lupardo
Democratic

The 123rd district is located entirely within Broome County, including the city of Binghamton and the towns of Union and Vestal. The incumbent is Democrat Donna Lupardo, who defeated Republican Lisa M. O'Keefe to win an eleventh term with 59.36% of the vote in 2024.

On January 8, 2026, Lupardo announced she would not run for re-election to a twelfth term.

=== Democratic primary ===
==== Nominee ====
- Daniel Norton

https://www.broomevotes.com/_files/ugd/be9a23_c106df70650247ab992d4b3b29d3cf9e.pdf

==== Eliminated in primary ====
- Dan Livingston, former Binghamton city councilman

==== Disqualified ====
- Jermaine Graham, state assembly employee

==== Withdrawn ====
- Nicholas Libous, business professional (endorsed Norton)

==== Declined ====
- Donna Lupardo, incumbent assemblymember

==== Endorsements ====
Daniel Norton

State legislators

- Donna Lupardo, state assemblymember from the 123rd district (2005–present)

Individuals

- Nicholas Libous, business professional and former candidate for this district
Dan Livingston

U.S. senators

- Bernie Sanders, Vermont (2007–present) (Independent)

Political parties

- New York Working Families Party

==== Fundraising ====
Italics indicate a withdrawn candidate.

Campaign finance reports as of October 19, 2026
Candidate	Contributions	Loans	Expenditures
Daniel Norton (D)	$535,219.09	$15,000.00	$511,263.58
Dan Livingston (D)	$230,623.82	$17,750.00	$210,325.35
Nicholas Libous	$58,199.00	$98,750.00	$168,494.72
Source: Transparency USA

==== Results ====
2026 New York's 123rd State Assembly district Democratic primary election
Party	Candidate	Votes	%
Democratic	Daniel Norton	3,444	59.72%
Democratic	Dan Livingston	2,315	40.14%
Write-in		8	0.14%
Total votes		5,767	100.00%

=== Republican primary ===
==== Nominee ====
- Lynn E. Parker, business owner

=== Third parties and independents ===
==== Declared ====
- Lynn E. Parker (Conservative), business owner
- Heather L. Micha (Coalition)

==== Withdrawn ====
- Dan Livingston (Working Families), former Binghamton city councilman

=== General election ===
==== Predictions ====
Source	Ranking	As of
State Navigate	Solid D	November 2, 2026

==== Fundraising ====
Italics indicate a withdrawn candidate.

Campaign finance reports as of October 19, 2026
Candidate	Contributions	Loans	Expenditures
Daniel Norton (D)	$535,219.09	$15,000.00	$511,263.58
Lynn E. Parker (R)	$174,104.68	$0.00	$115,791.02
Heather L. Micha (I)	$0.00	$0.00	$0.00
Dan Livingston	$230,623.82	$17,750.00	$210,325.35
Source: Transparency USA

==== Results ====
2026 New York's 123rd State Assembly district election
Party	Candidate	Votes	%	±%
Democratic	Daniel Norton			
Republican	Lynn E. Parker			
Conservative	Lynn E. Parker			
Total	Lynn E. Parker			
Coalition	Heather L. Micha			
Write-in				
Total votes				

== District 124 ==
2026 New York's 124th State Assembly district election
Nominee	Christopher S. Friend	Andrew G. Fagan
Party	Republican	Democratic
Alliance	Conservative	Working Families
Incumbent Assemblymember
Christopher S. Friend
Republican

The 124th district is located within Tioga and parts of Broome and Chemung counties, including the towns of Barker, Lisle, Maine, and Nanticoke in Broome County, and the city of Elmira and the towns of Ashland, Baldwin, Big Flats, Chemung, Elmira, Horseheads, and Southport in Chemung County. The incumbent is Republican Christopher S. Friend, who ran unopposed to win an eighth term with 99.27% of the vote in 2024.

=== Republican primary ===
==== Nominee ====
- Christopher S. Friend, incumbent assemblymember

=== Democratic primary ===
==== Nominee ====
- Andrew G. Fagan, former nominee for Tioga County legislator

==== Disqualified ====
- Miriam Osorio, public servant

==== Declined ====
- Anthony Cantando, political organizer

==== Endorsements ====
Andrew G. Fagan

Political parties

- New York Working Families Party

==== Fundraising ====
Italics indicate a disqualified candidate.

Campaign finance reports as of October 19, 2026
Candidate	Contributions	Loans	Expenditures
Andrew G. Fagan (D)	$92,284.91	$0.00	$64,623.24
Miriam Osorio	$0.00	$0.00	$0.00
Source: Transparency USA

=== Third parties and independents ===
==== Declared ====
- Christopher S. Friend (Conservative), incumbent assemblymember
- Andrew G. Fagan (Working Families), former nominee for Tioga County legislator

=== General election ===
==== Predictions ====
Source	Ranking	As of
State Navigate	Solid R	November 2, 2026

==== Fundraising ====
Campaign finance reports as of October 19, 2026
Candidate	Contributions	Loans	Expenditures
Christopher S. Friend (R)	$1,625.00	$0.00	$9,156.56
Andrew G. Fagan (D)	$92,284.91	$0.00	$64,623.24
Source: Transparency USA

==== Results ====
2026 New York's 124th State Assembly district election
Party	Candidate	Votes	%	±%
Republican	Christopher S. Friend			
Conservative	Christopher S. Friend			
Total	Christopher S. Friend (incumbent)			
Democratic	Andrew G. Fagan			
Working Families	Andrew G. Fagan			
Total	Andrew G. Fagan			
Write-in				
Total votes				

== District 125 ==
2026 New York's 125th State Assembly district election
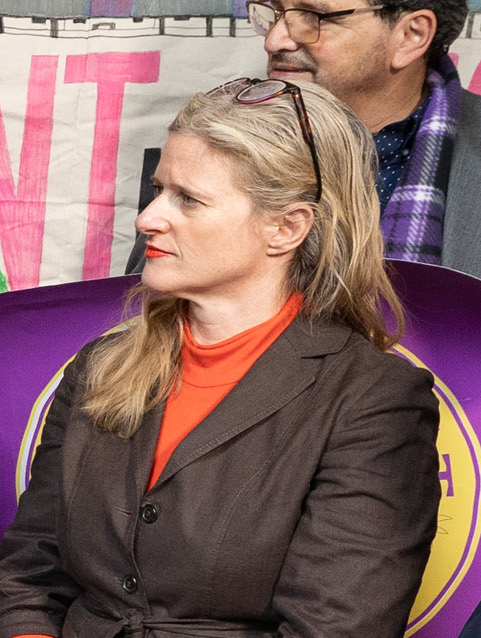
Nominee	Anna Kelles
Party	Democratic
Alliance	Working Families
Incumbent Assemblymember
Anna Kelles
Democratic

The 125th district is located within Tompkins and parts of Cortland counties, including the city of Cortland and the towns of Cortlandville, Harford, Lapeer, and Virgil in Chemung County. The incumbent is Democrat Anna Kelles, who ran unopposed to win a third term with 97.51% of the vote in 2024.

=== Democratic primary ===
==== Nominee ====
- Anna Kelles, incumbent assemblymember

==== Endorsements ====
Anna Kelles

Political parties

- New York Working Families Party

=== Third parties and independents ===
==== Declared ====
- Anna Kelles (Working Families), incumbent assemblymember

=== General election ===
==== Predictions ====
Source	Ranking	As of
State Navigate	Uncontested D	November 2, 2026

==== Fundraising ====
Campaign finance reports as of October 19, 2026
Candidate	Contributions	Loans	Expenditures
Anna Kelles (D)	$60,551.22	$0.00	$62,920.58
Source: Transparency USA

==== Results ====
2026 New York's 125th State Assembly district election
Party	Candidate	Votes	%	±%
Democratic	Anna Kelles			
Working Families	Anna Kelles			
Total	Anna Kelles (incumbent)			
Write-in				
Total votes				

== District 126 ==
2026 New York's 126th State Assembly district election
Nominee	John Lemondes Jr.	Ian Phillips
Party	Republican	Democratic
Alliance	Conservative	Working Families
Incumbent Assemblymember
John Lemondes Jr.
Republican

The 126th district is located within parts of Cayuga and Onondaga counties, including the city of Auburn and the towns of Brutus, Cato, Conquest, Mentz, Owasco, Sennett, and Throop in Cayuga County, and the towns of Camillus, Elbridge, Fabius, LaFayette, Lysander, Marcellus, Otisco, Pompey, Skaneateles, Spafford, and Tully in Onondaga County. The incumbent is Republican John Lemondes Jr., who defeated Democrat Ian Phillips to win a third term with 54.99% of the vote in 2024.

On August 18, 2025, Lemondes announced that he would run for the United States House of Representatives in New York's 22nd district to challenge one-term Democratic incumbent John Mannion. Lemondes suspended his congressional campaign and announced that he would run for a fourth term in the Assembly on January 16, 2026, after she was diagnosed with Lupus.

=== Republican primary ===
==== Nominee ====
- John Lemondes Jr., incumbent assemblymember (previously ran for the United States House of Representatives)

==== Withdrawn ====
- David H. Knapp, Onondaga County legislator

==== Fundraising ====
Italics indicate a withdrawn candidate.

Campaign finance reports as of October 19, 2026
Candidate	Contributions	Loans	Expenditures
John Lemondes Jr. (R)	$134,566.55	$0.00	$113,149.30
David H. Knapp	$13,629.07	$0.00	$18,314.14
Source: Transparency USA

=== Democratic primary ===
==== Nominee ====
- Ian Phillips, former Auburn School Board president and nominee for this seat in 2024

==== Endorsements ====
Ian Phillips

Political parties

- New York Working Families Party

=== Third parties and independents ===
==== Declared ====
- John Lemondes Jr. (Conservative), incumbent assemblymember (previously ran for the United States House of Representatives)
- Ian Phillips (Working Families), former Auburn School Board president and nominee for this seat in 2024

=== General election ===
==== Predictions ====
Source	Ranking	As of
State Navigate	Tossup	November 2, 2026

==== Fundraising ====
Campaign finance reports as of October 19, 2026
Candidate	Contributions	Loans	Expenditures
John Lemondes Jr. (R)	$134,566.55	$0.00	$113,149.30
Ian Phillips (D)	$296,877.72	$0.00	$215,767.10
Source: Transparency USA

==== Results ====
2026 New York's 126th State Assembly district election
Party	Candidate	Votes	%	±%
Republican	John Lemondes Jr.			
Conservative	John Lemondes Jr.			
Total	John Lemondes Jr. (incumbent)			
Democratic	Ian Phillips			
Working Families	Ian Phillips			
Total	Ian Phillips			
Write-in				
Total votes				

== District 127 ==
2026 New York's 127th State Assembly district election
Nominee	Albert A. Stirpe Jr.	Timothy R. Kelly
Party	Democratic	Republican
Alliance	Working Families	Conservative
Incumbent Assemblymember
Albert A. Stirpe Jr.
Democratic

The 127th district is located within parts of Madison and Onondaga counties, including the town of Cazenovia in Madison County, and the towns of Cicero, Clay, and Manlius in Onondaga County. The incumbent is Democrat Albert A. Stirpe Jr., who defeated Republican Timothy R. Kelly to win a seventh consecutive (ninth overall) term with 56.52% of the vote in 2024.

=== Democratic primary ===
==== Nominee ====
- Albert A. Stirpe Jr., incumbent assemblymember

==== Endorsements ====
Albert A. Stirpe Jr.

Political parties

- New York Working Families Party

=== Republican primary ===
==== Nominee ====
- Timothy R. Kelly, chair of the Manlius zoning board and nominee for this seat in 2024

=== Third parties and independents ===
==== Declared ====
- Timothy R. Kelly (Conservative), chair of the Manlius zoning board and nominee for this seat in 2024
- Albert A. Stirpe Jr. (Working Families), incumbent assemblymember

=== General election ===
==== Predictions ====
Source	Ranking	As of
State Navigate	Solid D	November 2, 2026

==== Fundraising ====
Campaign finance reports as of October 19, 2026
Candidate	Contributions	Loans	Expenditures
Albert A. Stirpe Jr. (D)	$189,555.00	$0.00	$82,958.47
Timothy R. Kelly (R)	$96,245.56	$0.00	$77,832.35
Source: Transparency USA

==== Results ====
2026 New York's 127th State Assembly district election
Party	Candidate	Votes	%	±%
Democratic	Albert A. Stirpe Jr.			
Working Families	Albert A. Stirpe Jr.			
Total	Albert A. Stirpe Jr. (incumbent)			
Republican	Timothy R. Kelly			
Conservative	Timothy R. Kelly			
Total	Timothy R. Kelly			
Write-in				
Total votes				

== District 128 ==
2026 New York's 128th State Assembly district election
Nominee	Pamela Hunter	Patrick J. Becher
Party	Democratic	Republican
Alliance	Working Families	Conservative
Incumbent Assemblymember
Pamela Hunter
Democratic

The 128th district is located entirely within Onondaga County, including the towns of DeWitt, Onondaga, Salina, the Indian reservation of Onondaga Reservation, and parts of the city of Syracuse. The incumbent is Democrat Pamela Hunter, who defeated Republican Daniel A. Ciciarelli to win a fifth full term with 62.98% of the vote in 2024.

=== Democratic primary ===
==== Nominee ====
- Pamela Hunter, incumbent assemblymember

==== Endorsements ====
Pamela Hunter

Political parties

- New York Working Families Party

=== Republican primary ===
==== Nominee ====
- Patrick J. Becher

=== Third parties and independents ===
==== Declared ====
- Patrick J. Becher (Conservative)
- Pamela Hunter (Working Families), incumbent assemblymember

=== General election ===
==== Predictions ====
Source	Ranking	As of
State Navigate	Solid D	November 2, 2026

==== Fundraising ====
Campaign finance reports as of October 19, 2026
Candidate	Contributions	Loans	Expenditures
Pamela Hunter (D)	$228,800.00	$0.00	$160,108.61
Patrick J. Becher (R)	$3,507.82	$0.00	$2,669.49
Source: Transparency USA

==== Results ====
2026 New York's 128th State Assembly district election
Party	Candidate	Votes	%	±%
Democratic	Pamela Hunter			
Working Families	Pamela Hunter			
Total	Pamela Hunter (incumbent)			
Republican	Patrick J. Becher			
Conservative	Patrick J. Becher			
Total	Patrick J. Becher			
Write-in				
Total votes				

== District 129 ==
2026 New York's 129th State Assembly district election
Nominee	Maurice Brown	Shawn M. Fiato
Party	Democratic	Republican
Alliance	Working Families	Conservative
Incumbent Assemblymember
Bill Magnarelli
Democratic

The 129th district is located entirely within Onondaga County, including the towns of Geddes, Van Buren, and parts of the city of Syracuse. The incumbent is Democrat Bill Magnarelli, who ran unopposed to win a fourteenth term with 98.52% of the vote in 2024.

=== Democratic primary ===
==== Nominee ====
- Maurice Brown, Onondaga County legislator

==== Eliminated in primary ====
- Bill Magnarelli, incumbent assemblymember

==== Endorsements ====
Maurice Brown

U.S. senators

- Bernie Sanders, Vermont (2007–present) (Independent)

State legislators

- Rachel May, state senator from the 48th district (2019–present)

Organizations

- Our Revolution
- Syracuse Democratic Socialists of America

Political parties

- New York Working Families Party
Bill Magnarelli

U.S. representatives

- John Mannion, NY-22 (2025–present)

Statewide officials

- Kathy Hochul, governor of New York (2021–present)

State legislators

- Chris Ryan, state senator from the 50th district (2025–present)
- Albert A. Stirpe Jr., state assemblymember from the 127th district (2007–2010; 2013–present)
- Pamela Hunter, state assemblymember from the 128th district (2015–present)

Political parties

- Onondaga County Democratic Party

==== Fundraising ====
Campaign finance reports as of October 19, 2026
Candidate	Contributions	Loans	Expenditures
Maurice Brown (D)	$0.00	$0.00	$0.00
Bill Magnarelli (D)	$367,898.06	$0.00	$523,760.47
Source: Transparency USA

==== Results ====
2026 New York's 129th State Assembly district Democratic primary election
Party	Candidate	Votes	%
Democratic	Maurice Brown	3,473	50.74%
Democratic	Bill Magnarelli (incumbent)	3,366	49.17%
Write-in		6	0.09%
Total votes		6,845	100.00%

=== Republican primary ===
==== Nominee ====
- Shawn M. Fiato

==== Withdrawn ====
- Patrick J. Guy

=== Third parties and independents ===
==== Declared ====
- Shawn M. Fiato (Conservative)
- Maurice Brown (Working Families), Onondaga County legislator

=== General election ===
==== Predictions ====
Source	Ranking	As of
State Navigate	Uncontested D	November 2, 2026

==== Fundraising ====
Campaign finance reports as of October 19, 2026
Candidate	Contributions	Loans	Expenditures
Maurice Brown (D)	$0.00	$0.00	$0.00
Shawn M. Fiato (R)	$90,500.62	$0.00	$50,620.98
Source: Transparency USA

==== Results ====
2026 New York's 129th State Assembly district election
Party	Candidate	Votes	%	±%
Democratic	Maurice Brown			
Working Families	Maurice Brown			
Total	Maurice Brown			
Republican	Shawn M. Fiato			
Conservative	Shawn M. Fiato			
Total	Shawn M. Fiato			
Write-in				
Total votes				

== District 130 ==
2026 New York's 130th State Assembly district election
Nominee	George Dobbins	Carl Butch Francis Fitzsimmons	Joseph Lamanna
Party	Republican	Democratic	Common Sense
Alliance	Conservative
Incumbent Assemblymember
Brian Manktelow
Republican

The 130th district is located within Wayne and parts of Monroe counties, including the town of Webster in Monroe County. The incumbent is Republican Brian Manktelow, who defeated Democrat James Schuler to win a fourth term with 63.69% of the vote in 2024.

On January 17, 2026, Manktelow announced he would not run for re-election to a fifth term.

=== Republican primary ===
==== Nominee ====
- George Dobbins, Lyons town board member

==== Eliminated in primary ====
- Summer Johnson, former Marion supervisor
- Mark C. Johns, member of the Monroe County legislature and former state assemblymember from the 135th district (2011–2020)

==== Declined ====
- Brian Manktelow, incumbent assemblymember

==== Fundraising ====
Campaign finance reports as of October 19, 2026
Candidate	Contributions	Loans	Expenditures
George Dobbins (R)	$214,041.91	$25,000.00	$222,600.60
Summer L. Johnson (R)	$47,741.48	$0.00	$48,658.78
Mark C. Johns (R)	$72,612.02	$0.00	$64,417.61
Source: Transparency USA

==== Results ====
2026 New York's 130th State Assembly district Republican primary election
Party	Candidate	Votes	%
Republican	George Dobbins	2,100	39.08%
Republican	Summer L. Johnson	1,757	32.70%
Republican	Mark C. Johns	1,495	27.82%
Write-in		21	0.39%
Total votes		5,373	100.00%

=== Democratic primary ===
==== Nominee ====
- Carl Butch Francis Fitzsimmons

==== Eliminated in primary ====
- Joseph Lamanna

==== Endorsements ====
Joseph Lamanna

Political parties

- New York Working Families Party

==== Fundraising ====
Campaign finance reports as of October 19, 2026
Candidate	Contributions	Loans	Expenditures
Carl Butch Francis Fitzsimmons (D)	$142,300.02	$2,000.00	$85,339.42
Joseph Lamanna (D)	$82,384.69	$0.00	$78,557.51
Source: Transparency USA

==== Results ====
2026 New York's 130th State Assembly district Democratic primary election
Party	Candidate	Votes	%
Democratic	Carl Butch Francis Fitzsimmons	2,113	50.54%
Democratic	Joseph Lamanna	2,059	49.25%
Write-in		9	0.22%
Total votes		4,181	100.00%

=== Third parties and independents ===
==== Declared ====
- George Dobbins (Conservative)
- Joseph Lamanna (Common Sense), Onondaga County legislator

==== Withdrawn ====
- Joseph Lamanna (Working Families)

=== General election ===
==== Predictions ====
Source	Ranking	As of
State Navigate	Solid R	November 2, 2026

==== Fundraising ====
Campaign finance reports as of October 19, 2026
Candidate	Contributions	Loans	Expenditures
George Dobbins (R)	$214,041.91	$25,000.00	$222,600.60
Carl Butch Francis Fitzsimmons (D)	$142,300.02	$2,000.00	$85,339.42
Joseph Lamanna (I)	$82,384.69	$0.00	$78,557.51
Source: Transparency USA

==== Results ====
2026 New York's 130th State Assembly district election
Party	Candidate	Votes	%	±%
Republican	George Dobbins			
Conservative	George Dobbins			
Total	George Dobbins			
Democratic	Carl Butch Francis Fitzsimmons			
Common Sense	Joseph Lamanna			
Write-in				
Total votes				

== District 131 ==
2026 New York's 131st State Assembly district election
Nominee	Mark Benjamin	Phillip Fleming
Party	Republican	Democratic
Alliance	Conservative
Incumbent Assemblymember
Jeff Gallahan
Republican

The 131st district is located within parts of Broome, Cayuga, Chenango, Cortland, Madison, Ontario, and Seneca counties, including the town of Triangle in Broome County, the towns of Aurelius, Fleming, Genoa, Ledyard, Locke, Montezuma, Moravia, Niles, Scipio, Sempronius, Springport, Summerhill, and Venice in Cayuga County, the towns of German, Lincklaen, McDonough, Otselic, Pharsalia, Pitcher, and Smithville in Chenango County, the towns of Cincinnatus, Cuyler, Freetown, Homer, Marathon, Preble, Scott, Solon, Taylor, Truxton, and Willet in Cortland County, the towns of DeRuyter, Georgetown, and Nelson in Madison County, the cities of Canandaigua and the land portion of Geneva and the towns of Canandaigua, Geneva, Gorham, Hopewell, Manchester, Phelps, and Seneca in Ontario County, and the water portion of the city of Geneva and the towns of Fayette, Junius, Seneca Falls, Tyre, and Waterloo in Seneca County. The incumbent is Republican Jeff Gallahan, who ran unopposed to win a third term with 99.23% of the vote in 2024.

On April 10, 2026, Gallahan announced he would not run for re-election to a fourth term.

=== Republican primary ===
==== Nominee ====
- Mark Benjamin

==== Declined ====
- Jeff Gallahan, incumbent assemblymember

==== Fundraising ====
Italics indicate a withdrawn candidate.

Campaign finance reports as of October 19, 2026
Candidate	Contributions	Loans	Expenditures
Mark Benjamin (R)	$144,170.75	$0.00	$78,061.22
Jeff Gallahan	$26,648.30	$0.00	$32,303.05
Source: Transparency USA

=== Democratic primary ===
==== Nominee ====
- Phillip Fleming, teacher's aide

=== Third parties and independents ===
==== Declared ====
- Mark Benjamin (Conservative)

==== Declined ====
- Jeff Gallahan (Conservative)

==== Fundraising ====
Italics indicate a withdrawn candidate.

Campaign finance reports as of October 19, 2026
Candidate	Contributions	Loans	Expenditures
Mark Benjamin (C)	$144,170.75	$0.00	$78,061.22
Jeff Gallahan	$26,648.30	$0.00	$32,303.05
Source: Transparency USA

=== General election ===
==== Predictions ====
Source	Ranking	As of
State Navigate	Solid R	November 2, 2026

==== Fundraising ====
Campaign finance reports as of October 19, 2026
Candidate	Contributions	Loans	Expenditures
Mark Benjamin (R)	$144,170.75	$0.00	$78,061.22
Phillip Fleming (D)	$50,928.51	$0.00	$45,355.94
Source: Transparency USA

==== Results ====
2026 New York's 131st State Assembly district election
Party	Candidate	Votes	%	±%
Republican	Mark Benjamin			
Conservative	Mark Benjamin			
Total	Mark Benjamin			
Democratic	Phillip Fleming			
Write-in				
Total votes				

== District 132 ==
2026 New York's 132nd State Assembly district election
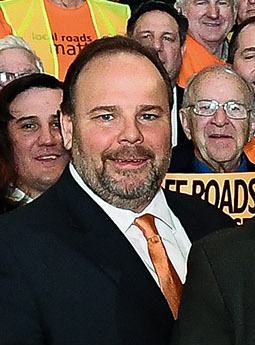
Nominee	Phil Palmesano
Party	Republican
Alliance	Conservative
Incumbent Assemblymember
Phil Palmesano
Republican

The 132nd district is located within Schuyler, Yates, and parts of Chemung, Seneca, and Steuben counties, including the towns of Catlin, Erin, Van Etten, and Veteran in Chemung County, the towns of Covert, Lodi, Ovid, Romulus, and Varick in Seneca County, and the cities of Corning and Hornell and the towns of Addison, Bath, Bradford, Cameron, Campbell, Caton, Corning, Erwin, Fremont, Hornby, Hornellsville, Howard, Lindley, Pulteney, Rathbone, Thurston, Tuscarora, Urbana, Wayne, and Woodhull in Steuben County. The incumbent is Republican Phil Palmesano, who ran unopposed to win an eighth term with 99.23% of the vote in 2024.

=== Republican primary ===
==== Nominee ====
- Phil Palmesano, incumbent assemblymember

=== Third parties and independents ===
==== Declared ====
- Phil Palmesano (Conservative), incumbent assemblymember

=== General election ===
==== Predictions ====
Source	Ranking	As of
State Navigate	Uncontested R	November 2, 2026

==== Fundraising ====
Campaign finance reports as of October 19, 2026
Candidate	Contributions	Loans	Expenditures
Phil Palmesano (R)	$85,080.19	$0.00	$99,695.57
Source: Transparency USA

==== Results ====
2026 New York's 132nd State Assembly district election
Party	Candidate	Votes	%	±%
Republican	Phil Palmesano			
Conservative	Phil Palmesano			
Total	Phil Palmesano (incumbent)			
Write-in				
Total votes				

== District 133 ==
2026 New York's 133rd State Assembly district election
Nominee	Andrea Bailey	Gladys Flores Garcia
Party	Republican	Democratic
Alliance	Conservative
Incumbent Assemblymember
Andrea Bailey
Republican

The 133rd district is located within Livingston and parts of Monroe, Ontario, Steuben, and Wyoming counties, including the town of Rush in Monroe County, the towns of Bristol, Canadice, East Bloomfield, Farmington, Naples, Richmond, South Bristol, Victor, and West Bloomfield in Ontario County, the towns of Avoca, Cohocton, Dansville, Prattsburgh, Wayland, and Wheeler in Steuben County, and the towns of Castile, Covington, and Perry in Wyoming County. The incumbent is Republican Andrea Bailey, who defeated Democrat Colleen Walsh-Williams to succeed retiring three-term Republican incumbent Marjorie Byrnes with 65% of the vote in 2024.

=== Republican primary ===
==== Nominee ====
- Andrea Bailey, incumbent assemblymember

=== Democratic primary ===
==== Nominee ====
- Gladys Flores Garcia

==== Withdrawn ====
- Mary Ellen Heyman, community leader

==== Fundraising ====
Italics indicate a withdrawn candidate.

Campaign finance reports as of October 19, 2026
Candidate	Contributions	Loans	Expenditures
Gladys Flores Garcia (D)	$13,099.61	$0.00	$6,070.05
Mary Ellen Heyman	$2,138.57	$0.00	$1,753.70
Source: Transparency USA

=== Third parties and independents ===
==== Declared ====
- Andrea Bailey (Conservative), incumbent assemblymember

=== General election ===
==== Predictions ====
Source	Ranking	As of
State Navigate	Solid R	November 2, 2026

==== Fundraising ====
Campaign finance reports as of October 19, 2026
Candidate	Contributions	Loans	Expenditures
Andrea Bailey (R)	$141,825.48	$0.00	$59,524.13
Gladys Flores Garcia (D)	$13,099.61	$0.00	$6,070.05
Source: Transparency USA

==== Results ====
2026 New York's 133rd State Assembly district election
Party	Candidate	Votes	%	±%
Republican	Andrea Bailey			
Conservative	Andrea Bailey			
Total	Andrea Bailey (incumbent)			
Democratic	Gladys Flores Garcia			
Write-in				
Total votes				

== District 134 ==
2026 New York's 134th State Assembly district election
Nominee	Josh Jensen	Kurtis VanWuyckhuyse
Party	Republican	Democratic
Alliance	Conservative	Working Families
Incumbent Assemblymember
Josh Jensen
Republican

The 134th district is located entirely within Monroe County, including the towns of Greece, Ogden, and Parma. The incumbent is Republican Josh Jensen, who ran unopposed to win a third term with 99.36% of the vote in 2024.

=== Republican primary ===
==== Nominee ====
- Josh Jensen, incumbent assemblymember

=== Democratic primary ===
==== Nominee ====
- Kurtis VanWuyckhuyse, auto shop manager

==== Endorsements ====
Kurtis VanWuyckhuyse

Organizations

- Our Revolution
- Run for Something

Political parties

- New York Working Families Party

=== Third parties and independents ===
==== Declared ====
- Josh Jensen (Conservative), incumbent assemblymember
- Kurtis VanWuyckhuyse (Working Families), auto shop manager

=== General election ===
==== Predictions ====
Source	Ranking	As of
State Navigate	Solid R	November 2, 2026

==== Fundraising ====
Campaign finance reports as of October 19, 2026
Candidate	Contributions	Loans	Expenditures
Josh Jensen (R)	$206,693.08	$0.00	$169,558.48
Kurtis VanWuyckhuyse (D)	$78,336.49	$0.00	$51,498.34
Source: Transparency USA

==== Results ====
2026 New York's 134th State Assembly district election
Party	Candidate	Votes	%	±%
Republican	Josh Jensen			
Conservative	Josh Jensen			
Total	Josh Jensen (incumbent)			
Democratic	Kurtis VanWuyckhuyse			
Working Families	Kurtis VanWuyckhuyse			
Total	Kurtis VanWuyckhuyse			
Write-in				
Total votes				

== District 135 ==
2026 New York's 135th State Assembly district election
Nominee	Jennifer Lunsford	Kalinda Washington
Party	Democratic	Republican
Alliance	Working Families	Conservative
Incumbent Assemblymember
Jennifer Lunsford
Democratic

The 135th district is located entirely within Monroe County, including the towns of East Rochester, Mendon, Penfield, Perinton, and Pittsford. The incumbent is Democrat Jennifer Lunsford, who defeated Republican Kimberly DeRosa to win a third term with 58% of the vote in 2024.

=== Democratic primary ===
==== Nominee ====
- Jennifer Lunsford, incumbent assemblymember

==== Endorsements ====
Jennifer Lunsford

Political parties

- New York Working Families Party

=== Republican primary ===
==== Nominee ====
- Kalinda Washington, teacher and advocate

=== Third parties and independents ===
==== Declared ====
- Kalinda Washington (Conservative), teacher and advocate
- Jennifer Lunsford (Working Families), incumbent assemblymember

=== General election ===
==== Predictions ====
Source	Ranking	As of
State Navigate	Solid D	November 2, 2026

==== Fundraising ====
Campaign finance reports as of October 19, 2026
Candidate	Contributions	Loans	Expenditures
Jennifer Lunsford (D)	$313,314.68	$0.00	$109,635.61
Kalinda Washington (R)	$10,249.67	$0.00	$642.45
Source: Transparency USA

==== Results ====
2026 New York's 135th State Assembly district election
Party	Candidate	Votes	%	±%
Democratic	Jennifer Lunsford			
Working Families	Jennifer Lunsford			
Total	Jennifer Lunsford (incumbent)			
Republican	Kalinda Washington			
Conservative	Kalinda Washington			
Total	Kalinda Washington			
Write-in				
Total votes				

== District 136 ==
2026 New York's 136th State Assembly district election
Nominee	Sarah Clark	Clianda A. Florence
Party	Democratic	Republican
Alliance	Working Families	Conservative
Incumbent Assemblymember
Sarah Clark
Democratic

The 136th district is located entirely within Monroe County, including the towns of Brighton and Irondequoit and parts of the city of Rochester. The incumbent is Democrat Sarah Clark, who defeated Republican Orlando J. Rivera to win a third term with 67.4% of the vote in 2024.

=== Democratic primary ===
==== Nominee ====
- Sarah Clark, incumbent assemblymember

==== Endorsements ====
Sarah Clark

Political parties

- New York Working Families Party

=== Republican primary ===
==== Nominee ====
- Clianda A. Florence, educator

=== Third parties and independents ===
==== Declared ====
- Clianda A. Florence (Conservative), educator
- Sarah Clark (Working Families), incumbent assemblymember

=== General election ===
==== Predictions ====
Source	Ranking	As of
State Navigate	Solid D	November 2, 2026

==== Fundraising ====
Campaign finance reports as of October 19, 2026
Candidate	Contributions	Loans	Expenditures
Sarah Clark (D)	$116,863.40	$0.00	$70,328.07
Clianda A. Florence (R)	$6,094.00	$0.00	$3,761.10
Source: Transparency USA

==== Results ====
2026 New York's 136th State Assembly district election
Party	Candidate	Votes	%	±%
Democratic	Sarah Clark			
Working Families	Sarah Clark			
Total	Sarah Clark (incumbent)			
Republican	Clianda A. Florence			
Conservative	Clianda A. Florence			
Total	Clianda A. Florence			
Write-in				
Total votes				

== District 137 ==
2026 New York's 137th State Assembly district election
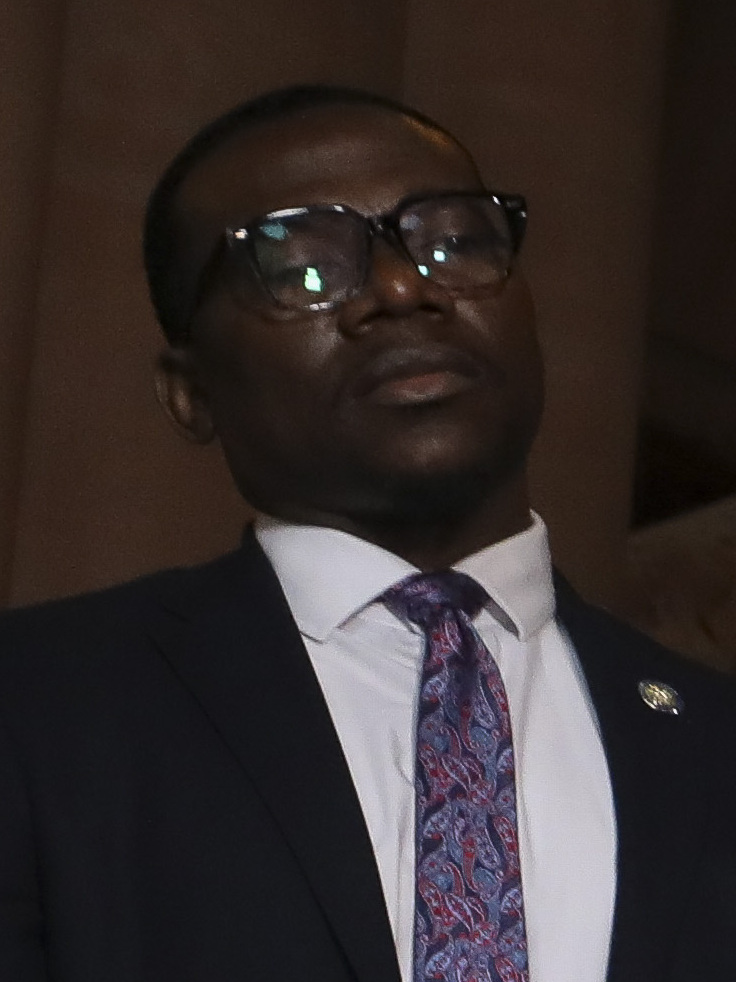

Nominee	Demond Meeks	David J. Ferris	Mercedes Vazquez-Simmons
Party	Democratic	Republican	Mercedes Simmons Cares
Alliance	Working Families	Conservative
Incumbent Assemblymember
Demond Meeks
Democratic

The 137th district is located entirely within Monroe County, including the town of Gates and parts of the city of Rochester. The incumbent is Democrat Demond Meeks, who defeated Republican Marcus C. Williams to win a third term with 71.59% of the vote in 2024.

=== Democratic primary ===
==== Nominee ====
- Demond Meeks, incumbent assemblymember

==== Eliminated in primary ====
- Mercedes Vazquez-Simmons, vice president of the Monroe County Legislature

==== Endorsements ====
Demond Meeks

Political parties

- New York Working Families Party

==== Fundraising ====
Campaign finance reports as of October 19, 2026
Candidate	Contributions	Loans	Expenditures
Demond Meeks (D)	$0.00	$0.00	$0.00
Mercedes Vazquez-Simmons (D)	$196,041.33	$9,000.00	$177,404.60
Source: Transparency USA

==== Results ====
2026 New York's 137th State Assembly district Democratic primary election
Party	Candidate	Votes	%
Democratic	Demond Meeks (incumbent)	4,801	81.28%
Democratic	Mercedes Vazquez-Simmons	1,100	18.62%
Write-in		6	0.10%
Total votes		5,907	100.00%

=== Republican primary ===
==== Nominee ====
- David J. Ferris, member of the Gates Republican Party

=== Third parties and independents ===
==== Declared ====
- David J. Ferris (Conservative), member of the Gates Republican Party
- Demond Meeks (Working Families), incumbent assemblymember
- Mercedes Vazquez-Simmons (Mercedes Simmons Cares), vice president of the Monroe County Legislature

=== General election ===
==== Predictions ====
Source	Ranking	As of
State Navigate	Solid D	November 2, 2026

==== Fundraising ====
Campaign finance reports as of October 19, 2026
Candidate	Contributions	Loans	Expenditures
Demond Meeks (D)	$0.00	$0.00	$0.00
David J. Ferris (R)	$68,659.06	$0.00	$61,583.24
Mercedes Vazquez-Simmons (I)	$196,041.33	$9,000.00	$177,404.60
Source: Transparency USA

==== Results ====
2026 New York's 137th State Assembly district election
Party	Candidate	Votes	%	±%
Democratic	Demond Meeks			
Working Families	Demond Meeks			
Total	Demond Meeks (incumbent)			
Republican	David J. Ferris			
Conservative	David J. Ferris			
Total	David J. Ferris			
Mercedes Simmons Cares	Mercedes Vazquez-Simmons			
Write-in				
Total votes				

== District 138 ==
2026 New York's 138th State Assembly district election
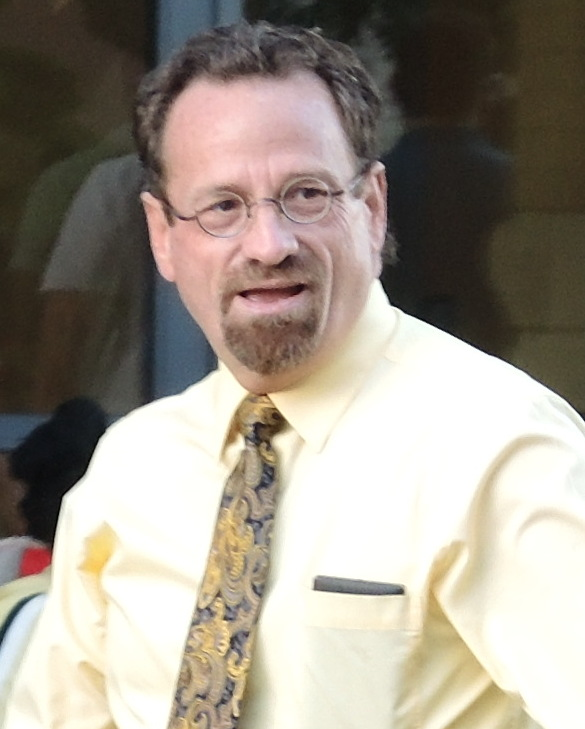

Nominee	Harry Bronson	Tracy A. DiFlorio
Party	Democratic	Republican
Alliance	Working Families
Incumbent Assemblymember
Harry Bronson
Democratic

The 138th district is located entirely within Monroe County, including the towns of Chili, Henrietta, and Riga, and parts of the city of Rochester. The incumbent is Democrat Harry Bronson, who defeated Republican Tracy A. DiFlorio to win an eighth term with 61.28% of the vote in 2024.

=== Democratic primary ===
==== Nominee ====
- Harry Bronson, incumbent assemblymember

==== Endorsements ====
Harry Bronson

Labor unions

- Communications Workers of America District 1

Political parties

- New York Working Families Party

=== Republican primary ===
==== Nominee ====
- Tracy A. DiFlorio, former Monroe County legislator

=== Third parties and independents ===
==== Declared ====
- Harry Bronson (Working Families), incumbent assemblymember

=== General election ===
==== Predictions ====
Source	Ranking	As of
State Navigate	Solid D	November 2, 2026

==== Fundraising ====
Campaign finance reports as of October 19, 2026
Candidate	Contributions	Loans	Expenditures
Harry Bronson (D)	$252,787.04	$0.00	$255,940.43
Tracy A. DiFlorio (R)	$114,724.71	$0.00	$96,890.32
Source: Transparency USA

==== Results ====
2026 New York's 138th State Assembly district election
Party	Candidate	Votes	%	±%
Democratic	Harry Bronson			
Working Families	Harry Bronson			
Total	Harry Bronson (incumbent)			
Republican	Tracy A. DiFlorio			
Write-in				
Total votes				

== District 139 ==
2026 New York's 139th State Assembly district election
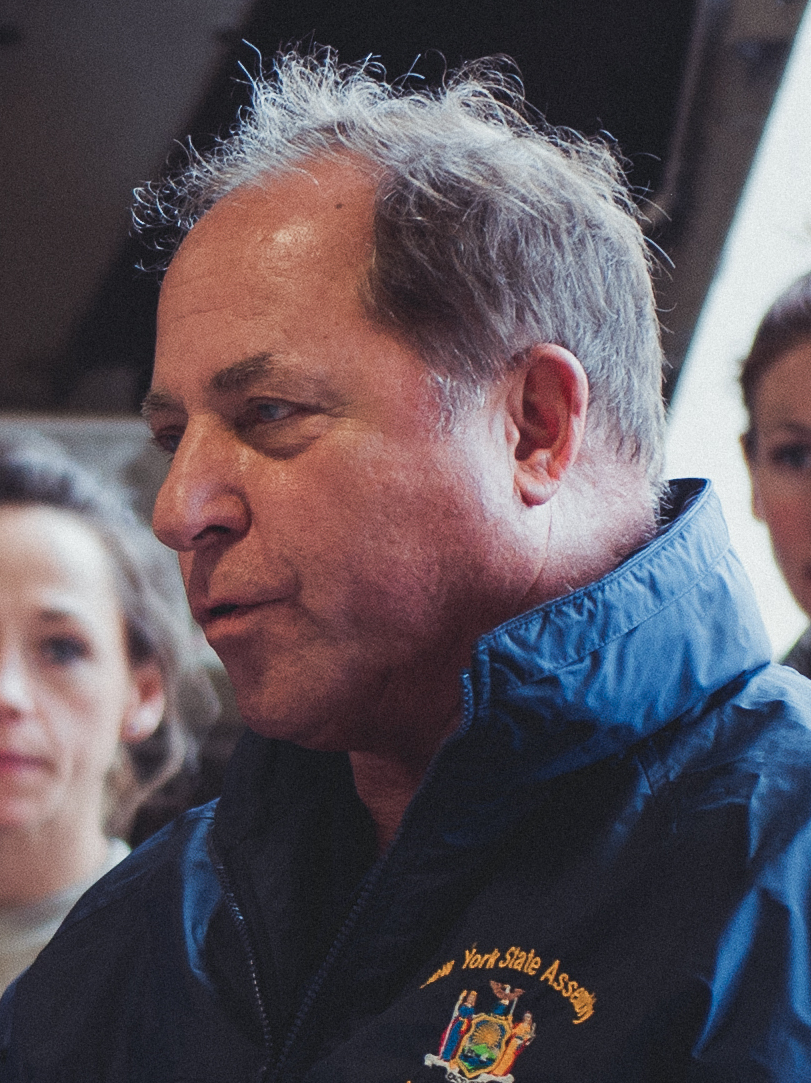

Nominee	Stephen Hawley	Sarah R. Wolcott
Party	Republican	Democratic
Alliance	Conservative
Incumbent Assemblymember
Stephen Hawley
Republican

The 139th district is located within Genesee, Orleans, and parts of Erie, Monroe, and Niagara counties, including the Indian reservation of Tonawanda Reservation in Erie and Niagara counties, and the towns of Clarkson, Hamlin, Sweden, and Wheatland in Monroe County. The incumbent is Republican Stephen Hawley, who ran unopposed to win a tenth full term with 99.6% of the vote in 2024.

=== Republican primary ===
==== Nominee ====
- Stephen Hawley, incumbent assemblymember

=== Democratic primary ===
==== Nominee ====
- Sarah R. Wolcott, organizer

=== Third parties and independents ===
==== Declared ====
- Stephen Hawley (Conservative), incumbent assemblymember

=== General election ===
==== Predictions ====
Source	Ranking	As of
State Navigate	Solid R	November 2, 2026

==== Fundraising ====
Campaign finance reports as of October 19, 2026
Candidate	Contributions	Loans	Expenditures
Stephen Hawley (R)	$39,264.75	$0.00	$61,450.78
Sarah R. Wolcott (D)	$60,768.90	$0.00	$49,422.21
Source: Transparency USA

==== Results ====
2026 New York's 139th State Assembly district election
Party	Candidate	Votes	%	±%
Republican	Stephen Hawley			
Conservative	Stephen Hawley			
Total	Stephen Hawley (incumbent)			
Democratic	Sarah R. Wolcott			
Write-in				
Total votes				

== District 140 ==
2026 New York's 140th State Assembly district election
Nominee	William Conrad III	Mohammed H. Faisal
Party	Democratic	Republican
Alliance	Working Families
Incumbent Assemblymember
William Conrad III
Democratic

The 140th district is located within parts of Erie and Niagara counties, including the city of Tonawanda, the town of Tonawanda, and parts of Buffalo in Erie County, and parts of the city of North Tonawanda in Niagara County. The incumbent is Democrat William Conrad III, who ran unopposed to win a third term with 99.2% of the vote in 2024.

=== Democratic primary ===
==== Nominee ====
- William Conrad III, incumbent assemblymember

==== Endorsements ====
William Conrad III

Political parties

- New York Working Families Party

=== Republican primary ===
==== Nominee ====
- Mohammed H. Faisal

=== Third parties and independents ===
==== Declared ====
- William Conrad III (Working Families), incumbent assemblymember

==== Disqualified ====
- Mohammed H. Faisal (Conservative)

=== General election ===
==== Predictions ====
Source	Ranking	As of
State Navigate	Solid D	November 2, 2026

==== Fundraising ====
Campaign finance reports as of October 19, 2026
Candidate	Contributions	Loans	Expenditures
William Conrad III (D)	$102,890.60	$0.00	$88,930.18
Mohammed H. Faisal (R)	$0.00	$0.00	$0.00
Source: Transparency USA

==== Results ====
2026 New York's 140th State Assembly district election
Party	Candidate	Votes	%	±%
Democratic	William Conrad III			
Working Families	William Conrad III			
Total	William Conrad III (incumbent)			
Republican	Mohammed H. Faisal			
Write-in				
Total votes				

== District 141 ==
2026 New York's 141st State Assembly district election
Nominee	Leah M. Halton-Pope
Party	Democratic
Incumbent Assemblymember
Crystal Peoples-Stokes
Democratic

The 141st district is located entirely within Erie County, including parts of the city of Buffalo. The incumbent is Democrat Crystal Peoples-Stokes, who ran unopposed to win a twelfth term with 99.2% of the vote in 2024.

On April 7, 2026, Peoples-Stokes announced she would not run for re-election to a thirteenth term.

=== Democratic primary ===
==== Nominee ====
- Leah M. Halton-Pope

==== Declined ====
- Crystal Peoples-Stokes, incumbent assemblymember

==== Fundraising ====
Italics indicate a withdrawn candidate.

Campaign finance reports as of October 19, 2026
Candidate	Contributions	Loans	Expenditures
Leah M. Halton-Pope (D)	$1,218.72	$0.00	$4,728.58
Crystal Peoples-Stokes	$223,475.99	$0.00	$312,117.81
Source: Transparency USA

=== General election ===
==== Predictions ====
Source	Ranking	As of
State Navigate	Uncontested D	November 2, 2026

==== Fundraising ====
Campaign finance reports as of October 19, 2026
Candidate	Contributions	Loans	Expenditures
Leah M. Halton-Pope (D)	$1,218.72	$0.00	$4,728.58
Source: Transparency USA

==== Results ====
2026 New York's 141st State Assembly district election
Party	Candidate	Votes	%	±%
Democratic	Leah M. Halton-Pope			
Write-in				
Total votes				

== District 142 ==
2026 New York's 142nd State Assembly district election
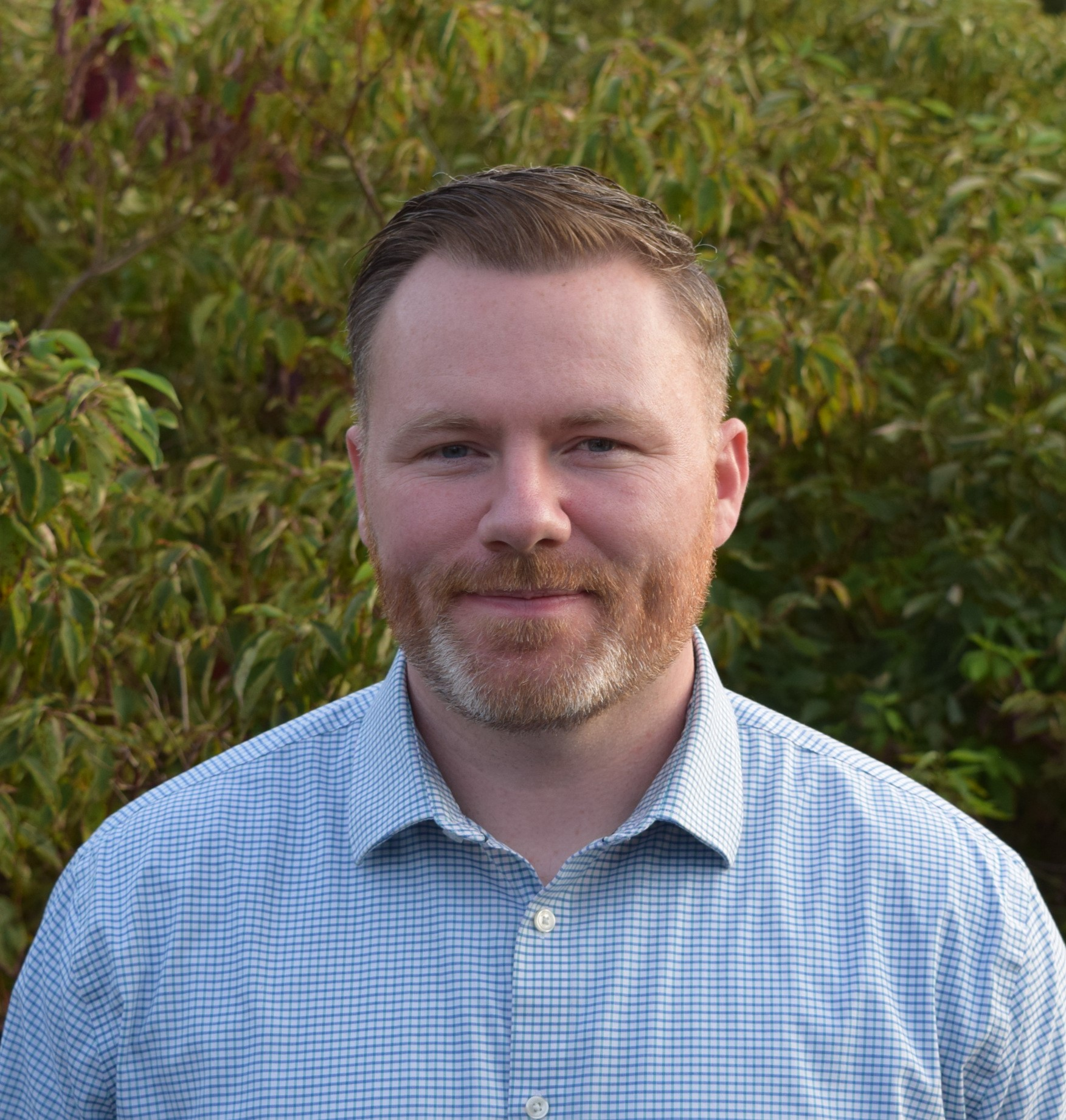

Nominee	Patrick B. Burke	Gary A. Dickson
Party	Democratic	Republican
Alliance	Working Families	Conservative
Incumbent Assemblymember
Patrick B. Burke
Democratic

The 142nd district is located entirely within Erie County, including the town of West Seneca, parts of the cities of Buffalo and Lackawanna, and parts of the town of Orchard Park. The incumbent is Democrat Patrick B. Burke, who defeated Republican Marc D. Priore to win a fourth term with 50.64% of the vote in 2024.

=== Democratic primary ===
==== Nominee ====
- Patrick B. Burke, incumbent assemblymember

==== Endorsements ====
Patrick B. Burke

Political parties

- New York Working Families Party

=== Republican primary ===
==== Nominee ====
- Gary A. Dickson, West Seneca supervisor

=== Third parties and independents ===
==== Declared ====
- Gary A. Dickson (Conservative), West Seneca supervisor
- Patrick B. Burke (Working Families), incumbent assemblymember

=== General election ===
==== Predictions ====
Source	Ranking	As of
State Navigate	Tossup	November 2, 2026

==== Fundraising ====
Campaign finance reports as of October 19, 2026
Candidate	Contributions	Loans	Expenditures
Patrick B. Burke (D)	$533,712.52	$0.00	$384,251.36
Gary A. Dickson (R)	$256,222.00	$9,000.00	$237,819.44
Source: Transparency USA

==== Results ====
2026 New York's 142nd State Assembly district election
Party	Candidate	Votes	%	±%
Democratic	Patrick B. Burke			
Working Families	Patrick B. Burke			
Total	Patrick B. Burke (incumbent)			
Republican	Gary A. Dickson			
Conservative	Gary A. Dickson			
Total	Gary A. Dickson			
Write-in				
Total votes				

== District 143 ==
2026 New York's 143rd State Assembly district election
Nominee	Patrick Chludzinski	Ryan J. Taughrin
Party	Republican	Democratic
Alliance	Conservative	Working Families
Incumbent Assemblymember
Patrick Chludzinski
Republican

The 143rd district is located entirely within Erie County, including the town of Cheektowaga, parts of the city of Buffalo, and parts of the town of Lancaster. The incumbent is Republican Patrick Chludzinski, who defeated four-term Democratic incumbent Monica P. Wallace with 51.82% of the vote in 2024.

=== Republican primary ===
==== Nominee ====
- Patrick Chludzinski, incumbent assemblymember

=== Democratic primary ===
==== Nominee ====
- Ryan J. Taughrin, United University Professions union member

==== Endorsements ====
Ryan Taughrin

Organizations

- Run for Something

Political parties

- New York Working Families Party

=== Third parties and independents ===
==== Declared ====
- Patrick Chludzinski (Conservative), incumbent assemblymember
- Ryan J. Taughrin (Working Families), United University Professions union member

=== General election ===
==== Predictions ====
Source	Ranking	As of
State Navigate	Tilt D (flip)	November 2, 2026

==== Fundraising ====
Campaign finance reports as of October 19, 2026
Candidate	Contributions	Loans	Expenditures
Patrick Chludzinski (R)	$356,174.28	$0.00	$323,052.24
Ryan J. Taughrin (D)	$521,208.47	$0.00	$429,321.77
Source: Transparency USA

==== Results ====
2026 New York's 143rd State Assembly district election
Party	Candidate	Votes	%	±%
Republican	Patrick Chludzinski			
Conservative	Patrick Chludzinski			
Total	Patrick Chludzinski (incumbent)			
Democratic	Ryan J. Taughrin			
Working Families	Ryan J. Taughrin			
Total	Ryan J. Taughrin			
Write-in				
Total votes				

== District 144 ==
2026 New York's 144th State Assembly district election
Nominee	Paul Bologna	Donna L. Dye Sholk
Party	Republican	Democratic
Alliance	Conservative	Working Families
Incumbent Assemblymember
Paul Bologna
Republican

The 144th district is located within parts of Erie and Niagara counties, including the towns of Clarence and Newstead, and parts of the town of Lancaster in Erie County, and the city of Lockport and the towns of Hartland, Lockport, Newfane, Pendleton, Royalton, Somerset, and Wilson in Niagara County. The incumbent is Republican Paul Bologna, who defeated Democrat Michelle M. Roman to succeed retiring four-term Republican incumbent Michael Norris with 51.82% of the vote in 2024.

=== Republican primary ===
==== Nominee ====
- Paul Bologna, incumbent assemblymember

=== Democratic primary ===
==== Nominee ====
- Donna L. Dye Sholk

==== Endorsements ====
Donna L. Dye Sholk

Political parties

- New York Working Families Party

=== Third parties and independents ===
==== Declared ====
- Paul Bologna (Conservative), incumbent assemblymember
- Donna L. Dye Sholk (Working Families)

=== General election ===
==== Predictions ====
Source	Ranking	As of
State Navigate	Solid R	November 2, 2026

==== Fundraising ====
Campaign finance reports as of October 19, 2026
Candidate	Contributions	Loans	Expenditures
Paul Bologna (R)	$322,331.51	$0.00	$245,009.38
Donna L. Dye Sholk (D)	$131,628.09	$0.00	$120,973.69
Source: Transparency USA

==== Results ====
2026 New York's 144th State Assembly district election
Party	Candidate	Votes	%	±%
Republican	Paul Bologna			
Conservative	Paul Bologna			
Total	Paul Bologna (incumbent)			
Democratic	Donna L. Dye Sholk			
Working Families	Donna L. Dye Sholk			
Total	Donna L. Dye Sholk			
Write-in				
Total votes				

== District 145 ==
2026 New York's 145th State Assembly district election
Nominee	Becky Wydysh	Nathan D. McMurray
Party	Republican	Democratic
Alliance	Conservative
Incumbent Assemblymember
Angelo Morinello
Republican

The 145th district is located within parts of Erie and Niagara counties, including the town of Grand Island in Erie County, and the city of Niagara Falls and the towns of Cambria, Lewiston, Niagara, Porter, and Wheatfield, the Indian reservation of Tuscarora Reservation, and parts of the city of North Tonawanda in Niagara County. The incumbent is Republican Angelo Morinello, who defeated Democrat Jeffrey Elder to win a fifth term with 61.28% of the vote in 2024.

On January 15, 2026, Morinello announced he would not run for re-election to a sixth term.

=== Republican primary ===
==== Nominee ====
- Becky Wydysh, former Niagara County legislator

==== Declined ====
- Angelo Morinello, incumbent assemblymember

=== Democratic primary ===
==== Nominee ====
- Nathan D. McMurray, former Grand Island supervisor

=== Third parties and independents ===
==== Declared ====
- Becky Wydysh (Conservative), former Niagara County legislator
- Nathan D. McMurray (Working Families), former Grand Island supervisor

=== General election ===
==== Predictions ====
Source	Ranking	As of
State Navigate	Very Likely R	November 2, 2026

==== Fundraising ====
Campaign finance reports as of October 19, 2026
Candidate	Contributions	Loans	Expenditures
Becky Wydysh (R)	$236,133.24	$0.00	$185,676.68
Nathan D. McMurray (D)	$32,917.92	$0.00	$110,969.11
Source: Transparency USA

==== Results ====
2026 New York's 145th State Assembly district election
Party	Candidate	Votes	%	±%
Republican	Becky Wydysh			
Conservative	Becky Wydysh			
Total	Becky Wydysh			
Democratic	Nathan D. McMurray			
Write-in				
Total votes				

== District 146 ==
2026 New York's 146th State Assembly district election
Nominee	Karen McMahon	Terence G. McGuire
Party	Democratic	Republican
Alliance		Conservative
Incumbent Assemblymember
Karen McMahon
Democratic

The 146th district is located entirely within Erie County, including the town of Amherst. The incumbent is Democrat Karen McMahon, who defeated Republican Deborah L. Kilbourn to win a fourth term with 59.97% of the vote in 2024.

=== Democratic primary ===
==== Nominee ====
- Karen McMahon, incumbent assemblymember

=== Republican primary ===
==== Nominee ====
- Terence G. McGuire

==== Withdrawn ====
- George J. McNerney, Western New York regional director for congresswoman Claudia Tenney

==== Fundraising ====
Italics indicate a withdrawn candidate.

Campaign finance reports as of October 19, 2026
Candidate	Contributions	Loans	Expenditures
Terence G. McGuire (R)	$0.00	$0.00	$0.00
George J. McNerney	$0.00	$0.00	$0.00
Source: Transparency USA

=== Third parties and independents ===
==== Declared ====
- Terence G. McGuire (Conservative)

==== Withdrawn ====
- George J. McNerney (Conservative), Western New York regional director for congresswoman Claudia Tenney

==== Fundraising ====
Italics indicate a withdrawn candidate.

Campaign finance reports as of October 19, 2026
Candidate	Contributions	Loans	Expenditures
Terence G. McGuire (C)	$0.00	$0.00	$0.00
George J. McNerney	$0.00	$0.00	$0.00
Source: Transparency USA

=== General election ===
==== Predictions ====
Source	Ranking	As of
State Navigate	Solid D	November 2, 2026

==== Fundraising ====
Campaign finance reports as of October 19, 2026
Candidate	Contributions	Loans	Expenditures
Karen McMahon (D)	$450,268.39	$0.00	$366,101.87
Terence G. McGuire (R)	$0.00	$0.00	$0.00
Source: Transparency USA

==== Results ====
2026 New York's 146th State Assembly district election
Party	Candidate	Votes	%	±%
Democratic	Karen McMahon (incumbent)			
Republican	Terence G. McGuire			
Conservative	Terence G. McGuire			
Total	Terence G. McGuire			
Write-in				
Total votes				

== District 147 ==
2026 New York's 147th State Assembly district election
Nominee	David DiPietro
Party	Republican
Alliance	Conservative
Incumbent Assemblymember
David DiPietro
Republican

The 147th district is located within parts of Erie and Wyoming counties, including the towns of Alden, Aurora, Boston, Brant, Colden, Collins, Concord, Eden, Elma, Evans, Holland, Marilla, North Collins, Sardinia, Wales, and parts of Orchard Park in Erie County, and the towns of Arcade, Attica, Bennington, Eagle, Gainesville, Genesee Falls, Java, Middlebury, Orangeville, Pike, Sheldon, Warsaw, and Wethersfield in Niagara County. The incumbent is Republican David DiPietro, who defeated Democrat Darci B. Cramer to win a seventh term with 67.98% of the vote in 2024.

=== Republican primary ===
==== Nominee ====
- David DiPietro, incumbent assemblymember

=== Third parties and independents ===
==== Declared ====
- David DiPietro (Conservative), incumbent assemblymember

=== General election ===
==== Predictions ====
Source	Ranking	As of
State Navigate	Uncontested R	November 2, 2026

==== Fundraising ====
Campaign finance reports as of October 19, 2026
Candidate	Contributions	Loans	Expenditures
David DiPietro (R)	$130,133.67	$0.00	$86,912.33
Source: Transparency USA

==== Results ====
2026 New York's 147th State Assembly district election
Party	Candidate	Votes	%	±%
Republican	David DiPietro			
Conservative	David DiPietro			
Total	David DiPietro (incumbent)			
Write-in				
Total votes				

== District 148 ==
2026 New York's 148th State Assembly district election
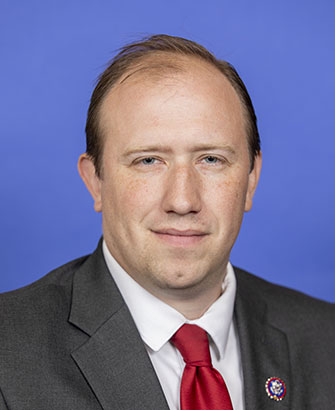
Nominee	Joe Sempolinski
Party	Republican
Alliance	Conservative
Incumbent Assemblymember
Joe Sempolinski
Republican

The 148th district is located within Allegany, Cattaraugus, and parts of Erie and Steuben counties, including parts of the town of Collins in Erie County, and the towns of Canisteo, Greenwood, Hartsville, Jasper, Troupsburg, and West Union in Steuben County. The incumbent is Republican Joe Sempolinski, who defeated Democrat Daniel J. Brown to succeed retiring nine-full-term Republican incumbent Joseph Giglio with 70.78% of the vote in 2024.

=== Republican primary ===
==== Nominee ====
- Joe Sempolinski, incumbent assemblymember

=== Democratic primary ===
==== Withdrawn ====
- Sean M. Pratt, water systems technician

=== Third parties and independents ===
==== Declared ====
- Joe Sempolinski (Conservative), incumbent assemblymember

=== General election ===
==== Predictions ====
Source	Ranking	As of
State Navigate	Uncontested R	November 2, 2026

==== Fundraising ====
Italics indicate a withdrawn candidate.

Campaign finance reports as of October 19, 2026
Candidate	Contributions	Loans	Expenditures
Joe Sempolinski (R)	$62,339.42	$7,500.00	$38,569.05
Sean M. Pratt	$0.00	$0.00	$0.00
Source: Transparency USA

==== Results ====
2026 New York's 148th State Assembly district election
Party	Candidate	Votes	%	±%
Republican	Joe Sempolinski			
Conservative	Joe Sempolinski			
Total	Joe Sempolinski (incumbent)			
Write-in				
Total votes				

== District 149 ==
2026 New York's 149th State Assembly district election
Nominee	Adam L. Bojak	Frank M. Bogulski
Party	Democratic	Republican
Alliance	Working Families	Conservative
Incumbent Assemblymember
Jonathan Rivera
Democratic

The 149th district is located entirely within Erie County, including the town of Hamburg and parts of the cities of Buffalo and Lackawanna. The incumbent is Democrat Jonathan Rivera, who ran unopposed to win a third term with 98.83% of the vote in 2024.

On October 9, 2025, Rivera announced that he would run for the New York State Senate in the 61st district to challenge partial-term Democratic incumbent Jeremy Zellner.

Adam L. Bojak won the Democratic primary to succeed Rivera on June 23, 2026.

=== Democratic primary ===
==== Nominee ====
- Adam L. Bojak, tenants' rights attorney and candidate for this district in 2020

==== Eliminated in primary ====
- Kevin W. Deese, banking professional
- Karen L. Hoak, Erie County deputy highway superintendent

==== Withdrawn ====
- Alexandre Burgos, state government professional, 2024 delegate to Democratic National Convention (endorsed Hoak)

==== Declined ====
- Jonathan Rivera, incumbent assemblymember (running for New York State Senate)

==== Endorsements ====
Adam Bojak

U.S. senators

- Bernie Sanders, Vermont (2007–present) (Independent)

State legislators

- Jabari Brisport, state senator from the 25th district (2021–present)
- Diana Moreno, state assemblymember from the 36th district (2026–present)
- Emily Gallagher, state assemblymember from the 50th district (2021–present)
- Phara Souffrant Forrest, state assemblymember from the 57th district (2021–present)
- Sarahana Shrestha, state assemblymember from the 103rd district (2023–present)
- Jonathan Rivera, state assemblymember from the 149th district (2021–present)

Local officials

- Chi Ossé, New York City councilmember from the 36th district (2022–present)

Labor unions

- International Brotherhood of Electrical Workers Local 2104
- New York AFL-CIO
- United Auto Workers Region 9A

Organizations

- Buffalo Democratic Socialists of America
- Democratic Socialists of America
- New York City Democratic Socialists of America
- Our Revolution
- Progressive Victory

Political parties

- New York Working Families Party
Karen L. Hoak

Organizations

- Erie County Democratic Committee

==== Fundraising ====
Campaign finance reports as of October 19, 2026
Candidate	Contributions	Loans	Expenditures
Adam L. Bojak (D)	$380,130.76	$0.00	$331,067.08
Karen L. Hoak (D)	$220,536.10	$0.00	$220,888.34
Kevin W. Deese (D)	$176,126.77	$8,000.00	$152,629.59
Source: Transparency USA

==== Results ====
2026 New York's 149th State Assembly district Democratic primary election
Party	Candidate	Votes	%
Democratic	Adam L. Bojak	4,014	49.49%
Democratic	Karen L. Hoak	2,700	33.29%
Democratic	Kevin W. Deese	1,387	17.10%
Write-in		10	0.12%
Total votes		8,111	100.00%

=== Republican primary ===
==== Nominee ====
- Frank M. Bogulski

==== Withdrawn ====
- Daniel S. O'Connell

==== Fundraising ====
Italics indicate a withdrawn candidate.

Campaign finance reports as of October 19, 2026
Candidate	Contributions	Loans	Expenditures
Frank M. Bogulski (R)	$112,940.09	$0.00	$55,940.33
Daniel S. O'Connell	$0.00	$0.00	$0.00
Source: Transparency USA

=== Third parties and independents ===
==== Declared ====
- Frank M. Bogulski (Conservative)
- Adam L. Bojak (Working Families), tenants' rights attorney and Democratic candidate for this district in 2020

==== Withdrawn ====
- Daniel S. O'Connell (Conservative)

==== Fundraising ====
Italics indicate a withdrawn candidate.

Campaign finance reports as of October 19, 2026
Candidate	Contributions	Loans	Expenditures
Frank M. Bogulski (C)	$112,940.09	$0.00	$55,940.33
Daniel S. O'Connell	$0.00	$0.00	$0.00
Source: Transparency USA

=== General election ===
==== Predictions ====
Source	Ranking	As of
State Navigate	Solid D	November 2, 2026

==== Fundraising ====
Campaign finance reports as of October 19, 2026
Candidate	Contributions	Loans	Expenditures
Adam L. Bojak (D)	$380,130.76	$0.00	$331,067.08
Frank M. Bogulski (R)	$112,940.09	$0.00	$55,940.33
Source: Transparency USA

==== Results ====
2026 New York's 149th State Assembly district election
Party	Candidate	Votes	%	±%
Democratic	Adam L. Bojak			
Working Families	Adam L. Bojak			
Total	Adam L. Bojak			
Republican	Frank M. Bogulski			
Conservative	Frank M. Bogulski			
Total	Frank M. Bogulski			
Write-in				
Total votes				

== District 150 ==
2026 New York's 150th State Assembly district election
Nominee	Andrew Molitor	Thomas A. Carle
Party	Republican	Democratic
Alliance	Conservative	Working Families
Incumbent Assemblymember
Andrew Molitor
Republican

The 150th district is located within Chautauqua and parts of Erie counties, including the Indian reservation of Cattaraugus Reservation and parts of the town of Collins in Erie County. The incumbent is Republican Andrew Molitor, who defeated Democrat Mike Bobseine to succeed retiring seven-term Republican incumbent Andy Goodell with 62.83% of the vote in 2024.

=== Republican primary ===
==== Nominee ====
- Andrew Molitor, incumbent assemblymember

=== Democratic primary ===
==== Nominee ====
- Thomas A. Carle

==== Endorsements ====
Thomas A. Carle

Political parties

- New York Working Families Party

=== Third parties and independents ===
==== Declared ====
- Andrew Molitor (Conservative), incumbent assemblymember
- Thomas A. Carle (Working Families)

=== General election ===
==== Predictions ====
Source	Ranking	As of
State Navigate	Solid R	November 2, 2026

==== Fundraising ====
Italics indicate a withdrawn candidate.

Campaign finance reports as of October 19, 2026
Candidate	Contributions	Loans	Expenditures
Andrew Molitor (R)	$140,858.95	$0.00	$70,865.55
Thomas A. Carle (D)	$3,527.07	$0.00	$2,768.06
Source: Transparency USA

==== Results ====
2026 New York's 150th State Assembly district election
Party	Candidate	Votes	%	±%
Republican	Andrew Molitor			
Conservative	Andrew Molitor			
Total	Andrew Molitor (incumbent)			
Democratic	Thomas A. Carle			
Working Families	Thomas A. Carle			
Total	Thomas A. Carle			
Write-in				
Total votes				

== See also ==
- List of New York State legislatures
