= New York's 134th State Assembly district =

American legislative district

Assemblymember
Josh Jensen; R–Greece

New York's 134th State Assembly district is one of the 150 districts in the New York State Assembly. It has been represented by Josh Jensen since 2021.

== Geography ==
District 134 is located entirely within Monroe County, comprising communities west of Rochester. It includes the towns of Greece, Ogden, and Parma and the villages of Spencerport and Hilton.

== Recent election results ==
=== 2026 ===
2026 New York State Assembly election, District 134
Party	Candidate	Votes	%
Republican	Josh Jensen		
Conservative	Josh Jensen		
Total	Josh Jensen (incumbent)	28,528	55.85
Democratic	Kurt VanWuyckhuyse		
Working Families	Kurt VanWuyckhuyse		
Total	Kurt VanWuyckhuyse	22,533	44.11
Write-in			
Total votes			

=== 2024 ===
2024 New York State Assembly election, District 134
Party	Candidate	Votes	%
Republican	Josh Jensen	40,247	
Conservative	Josh Jensen	8,656	
Total	Josh Jensen (incumbent)	48,903	99.4
Write-in		314	0.6
Total votes		49,217	100.0
Republican hold			

=== 2022 ===
2022 New York State Assembly election, District 134
Party	Candidate	Votes	%
Republican	Josh Jensen	31,027	
Conservative	Josh Jensen	7,553	
Total	Josh Jensen (incumbent)	38,580	99.3
Write-in		284	0.7
Total votes		38,864	100.0
Republican hold			

=== 2020 ===
2020 New York State Assembly election, District 134
Primary election
Party	Candidate	Votes	%
Democratic	Carolyn Carrol	5,172	78.8
Democratic	Dylan Dailor	1,386	21.2
Write-in		6	0.0
Total votes		6,564	100
General election
Republican	Josh Jensen	32,245	
Conservative	Josh Jensen	5,484	
Independence	Josh Jensen	1,208	
Total	Josh Jensen	38,937	57.8
Democratic	Carolyn Carrol	25,924	38.5
Working Families	Dylan Dailor	1,439	2.1
Green	Ericka Jones	1,047	1.6
Write-in		14	0.0
Total votes		67,361	100.0
Republican hold			

=== 2018 ===
2018 New York State Assembly election, District 134
Party	Candidate	Votes	%
Republican	Peter Lawrence	28,047	
Conservative	Peter Lawrence	5,705	
Independence	Peter Lawrence	3,492	
Reform	Peter Lawrence	514	
Total	Peter Lawrence (incumbent)	37,758	99.3
Write-in		263	0.7
Total votes		38,021	100.0
Republican hold			

=== 2016 ===
2016 New York State Assembly election, District 134
Party	Candidate	Votes	%
Republican	Peter Lawrence	35,882	
Conservative	Peter Lawrence	6,838	
Independence	Peter Lawrence	4,733	
Reform	Peter Lawrence	569	
Total	Peter Lawrence (incumbent)	48,022	99.6
Write-in		188	0.4
Total votes		48,210	100.0
Republican hold			

=== 2014 ===
2014 New York State Assembly election, District 134
Party	Candidate	Votes	%
Republican	Peter Lawrence	18,226	
Conservative	Peter Lawrence	4,993	
Independence	Peter Lawrence	1,050	
Total	Peter Lawrence	24,269	67.7
Democratic	Gary Pudup	10,378	
Working Families	Gary Pudup	1,175	
Total	Gary Pudup	11,553	32.2
Write-in		30	0.1
Total votes		35,852	100.0
Republican hold			

=== 2012 ===
2012 New York State Assembly election, District 134
Party	Candidate	Votes	%
Republican	Bill Reilich	34,197	
Conservative	Bill Reilich	6,829	
Independence	Bill Reilich	4,815	
Total	Bill Reilich (incumbent)	45,841	99.6
Write-in		171	0.4
Total votes		46,012	100.0
Republican hold			

=== 2010 ===
2010 New York State Assembly election, District 134
Party	Candidate	Votes	%
Republican	Bill Reilich	20,888	
Conservative	Bill Reilich	4,381	
Independence	Bill Reilich	2,138	
Total	Bill Reilich (incumbent)	27,407	69.5
Democratic	David Zimmerman	11,998	30.4
Write-in		29	0.1
Total votes		39,434	100.0
Republican hold			
