= Peter Lawrence (politician) =

American politician

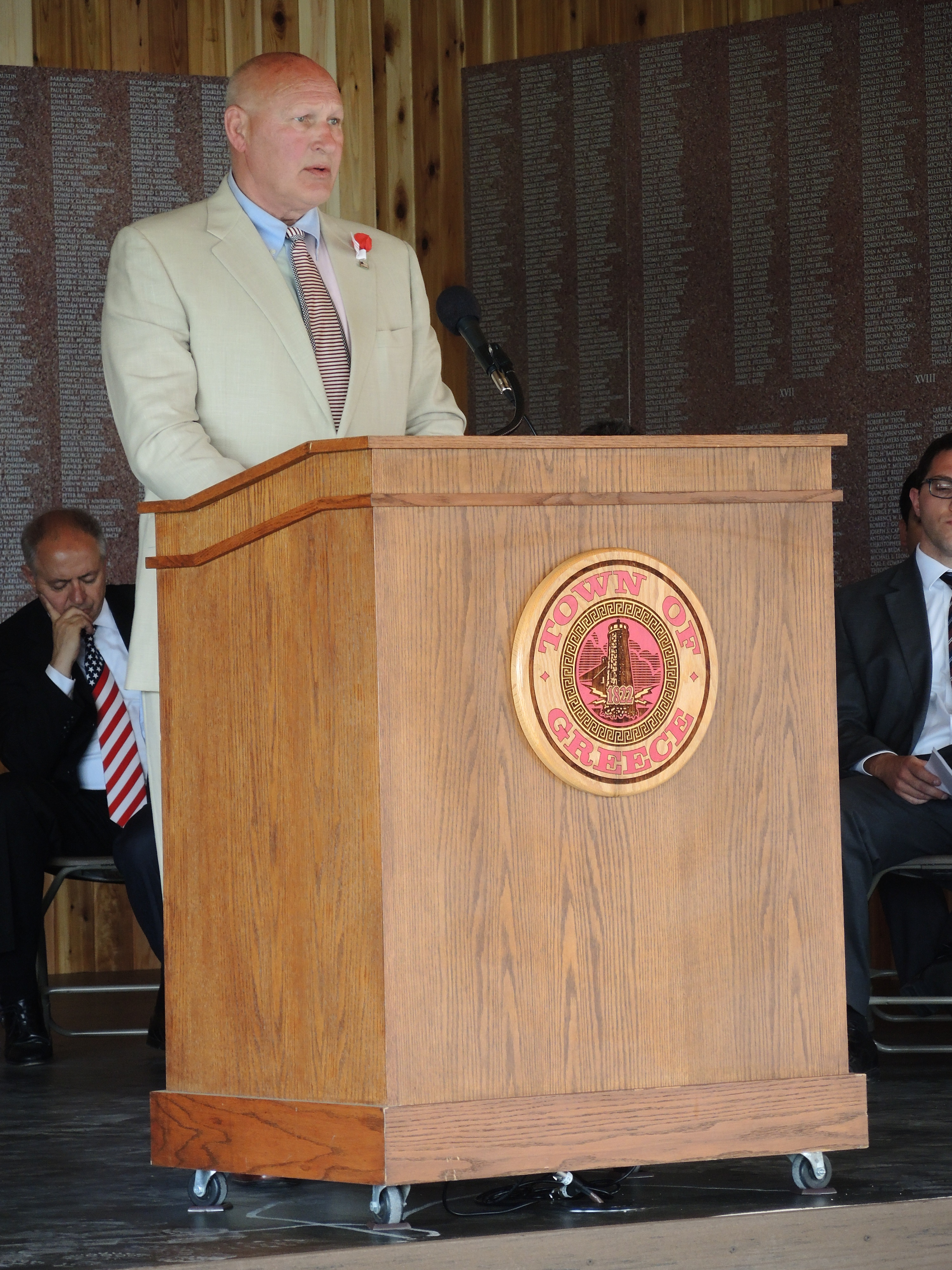

Member of the New York State Assembly from the 134th district
- In office January 1, 2015 – January 6, 2021
- Preceded by: Bill Reilich
- Succeeded by: Josh Jensen

Personal details
- Born: June 16, 1950 (age 76)
- Party: Republican
- Website: Official website

Peter Lawrence is an American politician who served as a member of the New York State Assembly from 2015 to 2021. A Republican, he represented Hilton, Spencerport and Greece in Monroe County.

== Career ==
A native of Monroe County, Lawrence formerly served as an officer with the New York State Police before retiring to accept a nomination from President George W. Bush as a United States Marshal, in which he would serve from 2002 to 2010. Lawrence also has served as a wrestling coach for SUNY Brockport, and as a board member for various other organizations.

In 2014, Assemblyman Bill Reilich opted not to seek re-election, and Lawrence was nominated by Republicans to replace him. He easily won election with nearly 68% of the vote.

For more than 30 years, Lawrence has served as a board member for the New York Law Enforcement Corporation. He has also been the assistant coach for the SUNY Brockport wrestling team.

Political offices
| Preceded by Bill Reilich | New York Assembly, 134th District; 2015–2021 |
