= Josh Jensen (politician) =

American politician

Member of the New York State Assembly from the 134th district
- Incumbent
- Assumed office January 6, 2021
- Preceded by: Peter Lawrence

Personal details
- Born: November 3, 1988 (age 37) Rochester, New York, U.S.
- Party: Republican
- Spouse: Casey
- Children: 2
- Education: Niagara University (BA)
- Website: Official Website

Josh Jensen (born November 3, 1988) is an American politician serving as a member of the New York State Assembly from the 134th district. Elected in November 2020, he assumed office on January 6, 2021.

== Early life and education ==
Jensen was born in Rochester, New York, and graduated from Hilton High School in the suburb of Hilton. He earned a Bachelor of Arts degree in political science and history from Niagara University.

He has also volunteered with the Hilton Education Foundation and Rochester area chapter of the National Fallen Firefighters.

== Career ==
In 2008, Jensen worked as an intern in the White House under President George W. Bush's administration. Jensen initially served in the White House Office of Strategic Initiatives and then moved to the White House Chief of Staff's office. He was later a special assistant in the New York State Senate. In 2010, Jensen joined the staff of State Senator Joseph Robach, serving as his public policy advisor, director of community affairs, director of public affairs, and director of communications. In 2019 and 2020, he was the director of communications for the Monroe Community Hospital. He later served as a member of the Greece, New York Town Board, representing the town's third ward.

He was elected to the New York State Assembly in November 2020 and assumed office on January 6, 2021. He represents the 134th Assembly district, which includes the towns of Greece, Ogden, and Parma and the villages of Spencerport and Hilton in Monroe County.

In 2023, Jensen was named Ranking Member of the New York State Assembly Committee on Health, the highest position in a committee that can be held by a minority party member.

== Politics ==
On May 9, 2022, Jensen sponsored legislation titled the "Everyone Can Play" bill. The bill would create a state grant to aid local municipalities with the installation and upgrading of playgrounds to be more handicap accessible.

In February 2023, Jensen introduced and sponsored legislation that would institute financial literacy requirements for public and private schools within the state of New York. The bill primarily focused on educating students about credit, debt, loans, and financial saving and planning. In April, the bill failed a procedural vote in the New York State Assembly Education Committee that would have brought it to a vote in the Assembly. The bill has since been reintroduced for the 2025-2026 legislative session.

In 2024, Jensen was named in City & State Magazines Health Care Power 100 list alongside New York State Senator Patrick M. Gallivan.

In October 2025, Jensen was named in City & State Magazines 40 under 40 Rising Stars of New York.

=== Committee assignments ===
As of August 2025, Jensen serves on the following committees in the New York State Assembly:

- Health (as Ranking Member)
- Corporations, Authorities & Commissions
- Children & Families
- Insurance
- Rules
