= William Payne House =

Historic house in New York, United States

- U.S. National Register of Historic Places
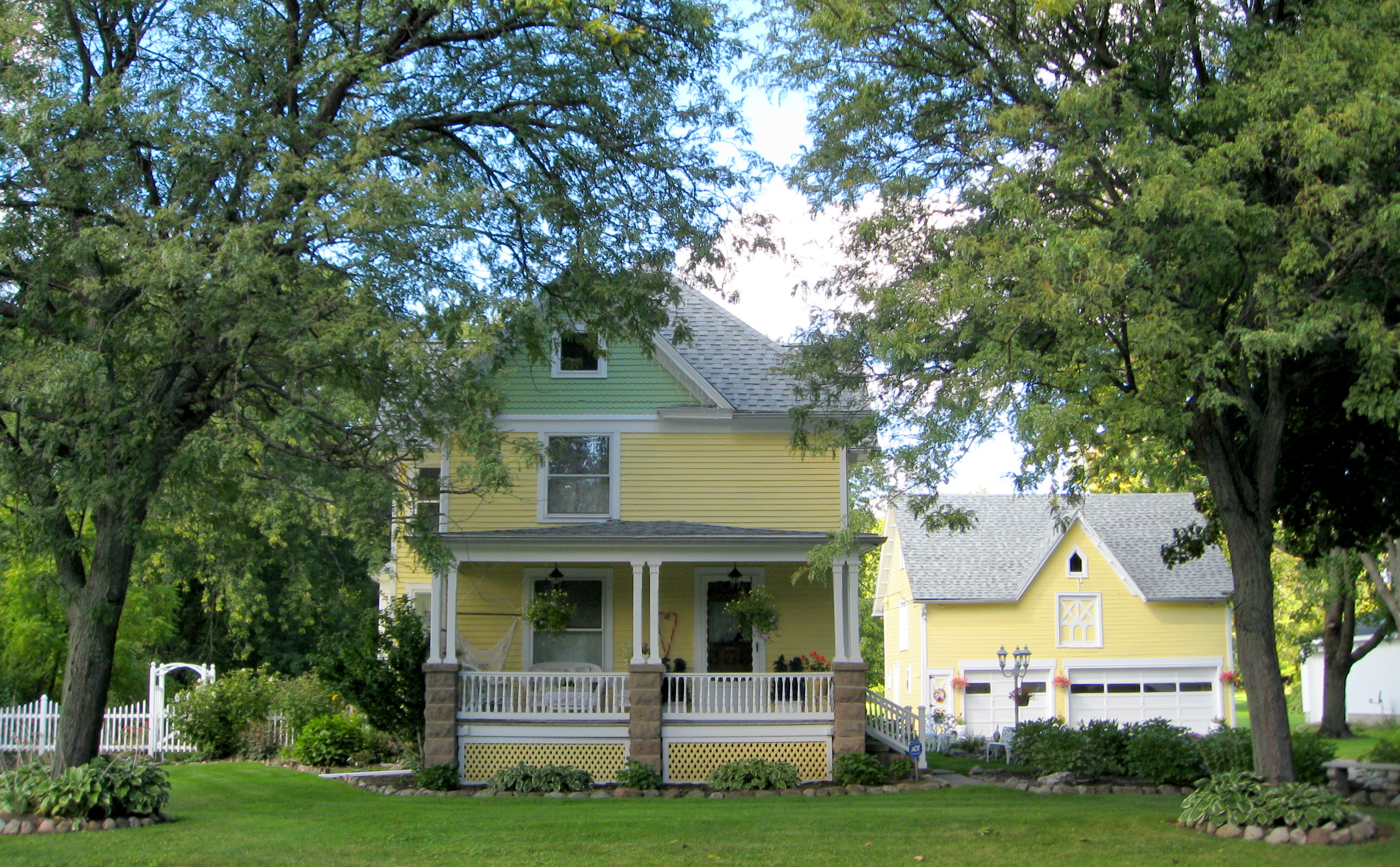
- William Payne House, September 2012

- Location within New York Location within the United States
- Location: 505 Elmgrove Rd., Greece, New York
- Coordinates: 43°10′46″N 77°44′00″W
- Area: 1.6 acres (0.65 ha)
- Built: 1905
- Architectural style: Queen Anne
- NRHP reference No.: 12000343
- Added to NRHP: June 20, 2012

William Payne House is a historic home located at Greece, Monroe County, New York. It was built in 1905, and is a 2 1/2-story, Queen Anne style frame dwelling with a hipped and cross-gable roof. It is sheathed in clapboard and features a full-with front porch. Also on the property is a contributing carriage house.

It was listed on the National Register of Historic Places in 2012.
