= Michele Brekke =

American NASA official

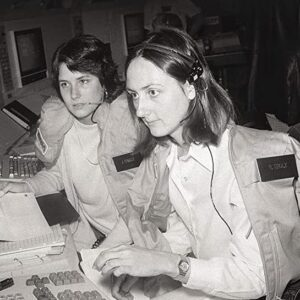
Michele Brekkie (left) in the Space Shuttle Mission Simulator at NASA

Michele Brekke (née Hank) is a former flight director in NASA Johnson Space Center (JSC) Space Shuttle Mission Control Center. She is notable for having been the first woman selected as a NASA flight director. She began the flight director training protocol in November 1985. On January 28, 1986, the Space Shuttle Challenger exploded moments after launch, destroying the orbiter and killing the entire crew. The Space Shuttle Program was in stand down for ~2 1/2 years while the accident was investigated. Brekke continued the flight director training protocol while the Space Shuttles were grounded. During this time, she was flight director for mission simulations in Mission Control. She also lead the On-Orbit Flight Techniques meetings, completing thorough reviews of nominal and malfunction procedures and adding rationale to the Flight Rules. In 1988, although offered a flight director assignment on one of the missions to follow return-to-flight, Brekke choose to leave the Flight Director Office, citing family priorities as the reason. Following several years as a Payload Integration Manager in the Space Shuttle Program Office, she was selected as the first woman NASA Flight Manager. She served as Flight Manager for six Space Shuttle missions. She retired from NASA in 2014 after 37 years of service. After retiring from NASA, she joined Special Aerospace Services where she was a flight manager for the Boeing CST-100 Starliner missions until 2022.

== Early life ==
Born Michele Ann Hank, Brekke grew up in the town of Greece, a western suburb of Rochester, New York. She attended Cardinal Mooney Catholic High School. In June 1969, when she was 16, her older brother Paul died in a boating accident. Brekke watched Apollo 11 land on the Moon on July 20, 1969, six weeks after her brother died, convincing her to be an astronaut. Brekke learned she would need a degree in aerospace engineering in order to meet qualifications. Wanting to go away to college she choose the University of Minnesota in Minneapolis, Minnesota. She received a Bachelor of Science degree in aerospace engineering from the University of Minnesota in 1975. She continued her studies at the University of Minnesota and received a Master of Science degree in aerospace engineering in 1977, while working part time at Honeywell as a computer programmer. While at the University of Minnesota, Brekke was a volleyball letter winner.

== Career ==
=== Space Shuttle payloads and mission operations ===
Brekke applied to be an astronaut when women were allowed to apply. Although not selected as an astronaut, she was hired as an astronaut instructor by NASA Johnson Space Center soon after she completed a master's degree in aerospace engineering at the University of Minnesota in 1977. After five years she began work as a Flight controller at the payload officer position in Mission Control. As a payload officer, she coordinated activities between NASA and its payload customers who wanted satellites launched or cargo taken into orbit. In 1985 Brekke was selected to join the flight director office, the first female to achieve this distinction.

=== Space Shuttle Flight Manager ===
As a Flight Manager, Brekke was responsible for the day-to-day decisions regarding mission design, operations and integration. This typically began about a year and a half prior to launch. Following launch, during the mission, she was a member of the Mission Management Team. As such, she reported on daily progress and accomplishments of payload/cargo operations. Brekke was Flight Manager for 6 Space Shuttle Missions, STS-85, STS-89, STS-92, STS-93, STS-95 and STS-99. Brekke applied again to be an astronaut and this time was included in the first set of 20 applicants called in for a week long series of medical testing and interviews. Brekke learned that a birth defect in her vision was cause to medically disqualify her from being an astronaut.

=== Manager, Customer and Flight Integration ===
Brekke performed operations and integration for Space Shuttle missions. Following the Columbia accident, she took the position of associate chief of the Space Medicine and Health Care Systems Office.

=== NASA Loaned Executive to Houston Technology Center ===
Brekke's position was as a "business accelerator" for technology start-ups.

=== Director, Innovation Partnerships and Technology Transfer ===
Brekke facilitated partnership development through Space Act Agreements and patent licensing.

=== Integration Manager, Visiting Vehicle Operations Integration ===
Brekke was responsible for operations integration for vehicles visiting the International Space Station (ISS). Brekke also served as a project manager for Common Communications for Visiting Vehicles (C2V2) where she helped develop hardware enabling visiting spacecraft to communicate with the ISS upon approach.

=== Career at Boeing ===
After 37 years at NASA, Brekke retired and took a position with Special Aerospace Services (SAS) . Under a contract with Boeing, Brekke was a Flight Manager for the Boeing CST-100 Starliner missions until 2022.

=== Awards and honors ===
In 1985, Brekke was named one of America's 100 outstanding young women by Good Housekeeping magazine. In 2007 Brekke received a Leadership in Technology Award from the Houston Chapter of the Association for Women in Computing (AWC). On October 4, 2019, Brekke served as the University of Minnesota Homecoming Grand Marshal. Brekke is also a recipient of the NASA Exceptional Achievement Award.
