= Chase Cobblestone Farmhouse =

Historic house in New York, United States

- U.S. National Register of Historic Places
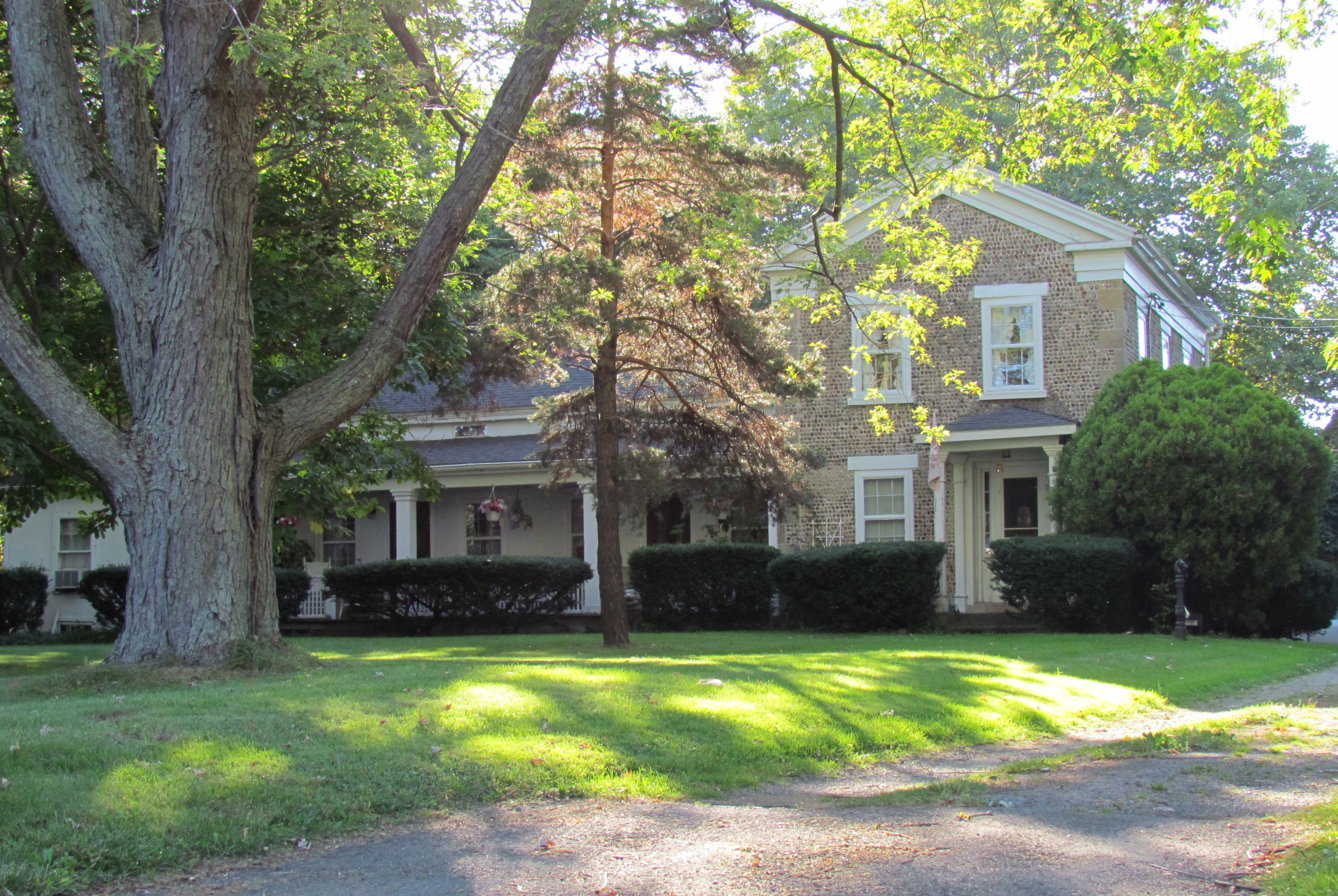

- Location within New York Location within the United States
- Nearest city: Hilton, New York
- Coordinates: 43°15′21″N 77°45′21″W
- Area: 54 acres (22 ha)
- Built: 1836
- Architect: Chase, Isaac
- Architectural style: Greek Revival
- MPS: Cobblestone Architecture of New York State MPS
- NRHP reference No.: 95001279
- Added to NRHP: November 7, 1995

Chase Cobblestone Farmhouse, also known as the Chase-Flack Farmhouse, is a historic home located at the Village of Hilton in Monroe County, New York, United States. It is a vernacular Greek Revival style cobblestone farmhouse built about 1836. It is constructed of rather small sized field cobbles and is one of ten surviving cobblestone buildings in the Town of Parma.

It was listed on the National Register of Historic Places in 1995.
