= Hilton High School =

High school in Rochester, New York, US

Location
- 400 East Avenue; Hilton, New York 14468; United States; 43°17′38″N 77°46′43″W

Information
- School type: Public, high school
- School district: Hilton Central School District
- Superintendent: Casey Kosiorek
- Principal: Jeffrey Green
- Teaching staff: 119.47 (FTE)
- Grades: 9-12
- Enrollment: 1,382 (2023–2024)
- Student to teacher ratio: 11.57
- Language: English
- Campus: Suburban
- Colors: Red, black and white
- Mascot: Cadet
- Website: www.hilton.k12.ny.us/o/hhs

Hilton High School is part of the student Hilton Central School District, a public school system based in Hilton, a suburb of Rochester, New York. Hilton High School offers an International Baccalaureate Diploma, and the school has made Newsweek 's Top 1,200 schools in the United States each year since 2005, when they ranked at number 989. Hilton High School has a high graduation rate of 92% (2017–18) and is ranked in the top 200 in the state of New York and eighth of approximately 20 schools in Monroe County, New York.

== Achievements ==
The first Hilton Schools Regents Diploma student, Jennie Mitchell, graduated in 1899. In 1949, more than 20 one-room schoolhouses and the "Henry Street School" were centralized.

== Sports ==
In March 2005, as a part of its Capital Bond Project, Hilton added an Aquatic Center at Merton Williams Middle School. This center replaced the old five-lane pool. This eight-lane pool with an attached diving well and two diving boards includes bleachers for 240 spectators and an electronic scoreboard.

- Hilton won the 2008 Monroe Community College High School Engineering Competition in the SumoBot competition, claiming the top 4 places.
- In 2005, the Hilton Girls' Cross Country Team won the 2005 Nike Team Nationals Race, making them the number one girls' cross country team in the nation that year.
- In 2014, the Hilton Cadets Wrestling Team won the Section V Class AA tournament and finished the season ranked fourth in New York State.

== Music ==
The school runs a marching band, concert band, symphonic band, jazz ensemble, and wind ensemble. The school's Winter Drum Line is a member of the New York State Percussion Circuit, and competes at membership tournaments throughout Western New York, including a competition hosted each winter at Hilton High School. The Drumline has won the NYS championship competition 15 times, with their most recent victory in 2018. In 2013, after performing their show "Arabian Nights: Legend of Scheherazade", Hilton High School earned the title of WGI World Champion in Percussion Scholastic "A" class.

Vocally, students participate in da Capo singers, men's chorus, women's chorus, and chorale. Each year the high school produces a musical.

== Notable alumni ==
- Ryan Callahan, former National Hockey League player
- Yianni Diakomihalis, folkstyle and freestyle wrestler, four-time NCAA wrestling champion at Cornell, 2022 Freestyle World Silver Medalist
- Josh Jensen, member of the New York State Assembly
- Roy Knyrim, film director and special-effects makeup artist
- JSKillerBee of the Wu Tang Clan

== See also ==
- Hilton, New York
- Hilton Central School District
