= Curtis-Crumb Farm =

Historic house in New York, United States

- U.S. National Register of Historic Places
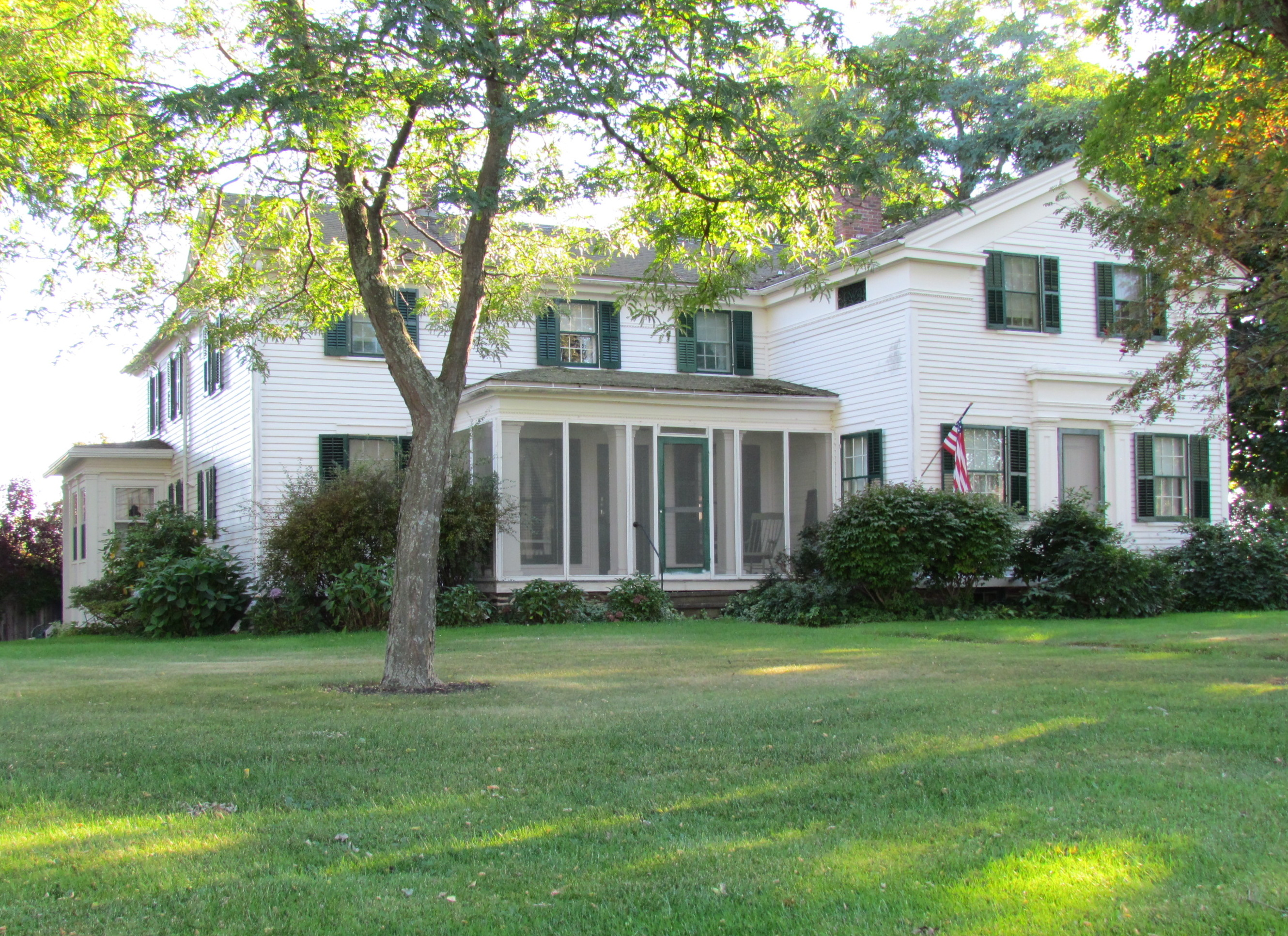

- Location within New York Location within the United States
- Nearest city: Hilton, New York
- Coordinates: 43°18′24″N 77°46′53″W
- Area: 141 acres (57 ha)
- Built: 1845
- Architect: Elias Curtis
- Architectural style: Greek Revival
- NRHP reference No.: 96001509
- Added to NRHP: January 3, 1997

Curtis-Crumb Farm is a historic home and farm complex located at Hilton in Monroe County, New York. The farmhouse was constructed in about 1845 and is a modest example of the rural Greek Revival style. The property also includes a carriage house, a hog pen, a smoke house, a corn crib, a 270-foot-long (82 m) stone wall, a cedar split-rail fence, and the remaining 141 acres (57 ha) of the original 145-acre (59 ha) farm.

It was listed on the National Register of Historic Places in 1997.
