= 1978 Holiday Inn fire =

Hotel fire in Greece, New York

Holiday Inn fire
- Date: November 26, 1978
- Location: Greece, New York, U.S.; 43.205395°N 77.668405°W
- Type: Fire
- Cause: Arson
- Deaths: 10
- Injuries: 34

The 1978 Holiday Inn fire broke out at a Holiday Inn hotel located at 1525 West Ridge Road in the town of Greece, New York, United States, on November 26, 1978. The fire was considered notable enough by the National Fire Protection Association (NFPA) and the Center for Fire Research to document the fire in their 1979 publications. In the end, ten people were killed and 34 injured; seven of the fatalities were Canadian nationals. In 2008, the NFPA listed the 1978 Holiday Inn fire as one of only three dozen or so hotel fires which killed ten or more people in the U.S. between 1934 and 2006.

== Fire ==
The Holiday Inn in Greece, New York, was built in 1963 at a cost of US$1.3 million and consisted of a wood-frame structure with interior hallways and 91 rooms. The hotel had passed a fire inspection earlier in the month. The fire started on the first floor between the north and west wings of the hotel around 2:30 am. Cleaning supplies and paper products were stored in a closet near the fire's point of origin. Due to fire doors being left opened and the nearby combustible materials, the fire spread very rapidly. The fire alarm system was not tied to a dispatch center and although some people reported a bell ringing, they failed to realize it was the fire alarm bell.

Investigators later determined that the fire broke windows in the hallways connecting the hotel's two wings. Flames shot up to the roofs of both wings and swept through an open area between the room's ceilings and roofs. Firewalls in the buildings did not extend to the roof, allowing the fire to rip through the top floor of each wing. The burning roof had collapsed into the top floor rooms.

The fire was not reported to the Greece-Ridge Fire Department until 2:38 am, when an off-duty firefighter passing by the hotel reported it. 125 firefighters from six nearby fire companies responded and fought the fire for two hours until 4:34 am. About 170 people were rescued from the building by firefighters and passers-by. The fire killed ten victims—eight women and two men—and injured 34.

== Investigation ==
Initially, the Greece Police Department did not consider the fire suspicious. Questions arose about whether or not the fire alarms could be heard in the lobby of the hotel when firefighters arrived. While hotel officials said the alarms were functioning, firefighters first at the scene said they were unable to hear the bells. Although the building met existing fire codes, it lacked some fire prevention equipment including smoke detectors and a sprinkler system. Additionally, the fire alarm system was not connected to the fire department or any other security agency, and there was only one vertical firewall between the two wings. The alarm system consisted only of one bell in the middle of each of the two wings. John Stickevers, a New York City fire investigator brought in to assist with the investigation, discovered that an uncommon, highly flammable liquid accelerant was used to start the fire inside a storage cupboard under the first floor stairwell. The fire was officially ruled as an arson attack, but no one was ever charged with this crime and the case remains open today.

In early 2011, police launched the most intensive investigation of the fire in the previous thirty years. On November 26, 2014, police announced that they have identified a suspect for the first time, 36 years after the fire. In 2018, it was reported that the investigation had been narrowed down to two suspects but that the investigation had stalled over disagreements between Greece Police and the Monroe County District Attorney on which suspect is responsible and over proof of arson.

== See also ==
- List of unsolved deaths
