= Hilton Central School District =

School district in New York, United States

Location
- 225 West Avenue; Hilton, New York 14468 United States
- Coordinates: 43°17′14″N 77°48′05″W

District information
- Type: Public
- Motto: Integrity, Welcoming and Affirming, People First, Lifelong Learning
- Grades: Pre-Kindergarten through Grade 12
- Established: 1930
- Superintendent: Dr. Casey Kosiorek
- Budget: $105.2 Million

Students and staff
- Students: 4500
- Colors: Red, Black and White

Other information
- Website: www.hilton.k12.ny.us

The Hilton Central School District (HCSD) is a public school district in New York State that serves approximately 4,500 students in the village of Hilton and the towns of Clarkson, Greece, Hamlin and Parma in Monroe County, with over 800 full and part-time employees and an operating budget of $105.2 million.

The average class size is 20-25(K-6), 20-26(6-12) students and the student-teacher ratio is 12:1.

Dr. Casey Kosiorek is the Superintendent of Schools.

The Board of Education (BOE) consists of 7 members who serve rotating 3-year terms. Elections are held each May for board members and to vote on the School District Budget.

Current board members are:

- Nancy Pickering - President
- Kaylee Bennett - Vice President
- Amanda Diedrich
- Mark Hilburger
- Ed Mascadri
- Kristine Price
- Stephanie Sloan

== District Leadership ==
- Dr. Casey Kosiorek, Superintendent
- Adam Geist, Assistant Superintendent for Business
- Stephen "Ned" Dale, Assistant Superintendent for Human Resources
- Kristen Paolini, Assistant Superintendent for Instruction

== Schools ==
=== Elementary Schools ===
- Northwood Elementary School (Pre-K-6), Principal - Melissa Perkowski, Assistant Principal - Sadie Beeman
- QUEST Elementary School (Pre-K-6), Principal - Derek Warren,
- Village Elementary School (Pre-K-6), Principal - Dr. Benjamin Rudd, Assistant Principal - Kim Eichas, Assistant Principal - Caitlin Law

=== Middle School ===
- Merton Williams Middle School (7-8), Principal - Dr. Marc D'Amico, Assistant Principals - Christina Wallace, Steven Sorensen

=== High School ===
- Hilton High School (9-12), Principal - Dr. Jeffrey Green, Assistant Principals - Mark Chase, Michael LeGault, Dr. Erin Schneider, and Erin Shaw

== Performance ==
The New York State Education Department named the District a "High Performing School District."

The Hilton Central School District is the first in New York State to offer the International Baccalaureate Programme (IB) across all grade levels. Hilton High School, recognized as one of the nation's top high schools by U.S. News & World Report in 2012, offers an International Baccalaureate Diploma.
