= Greece, New York =

Town in Monroe County, New York, United States

- Town
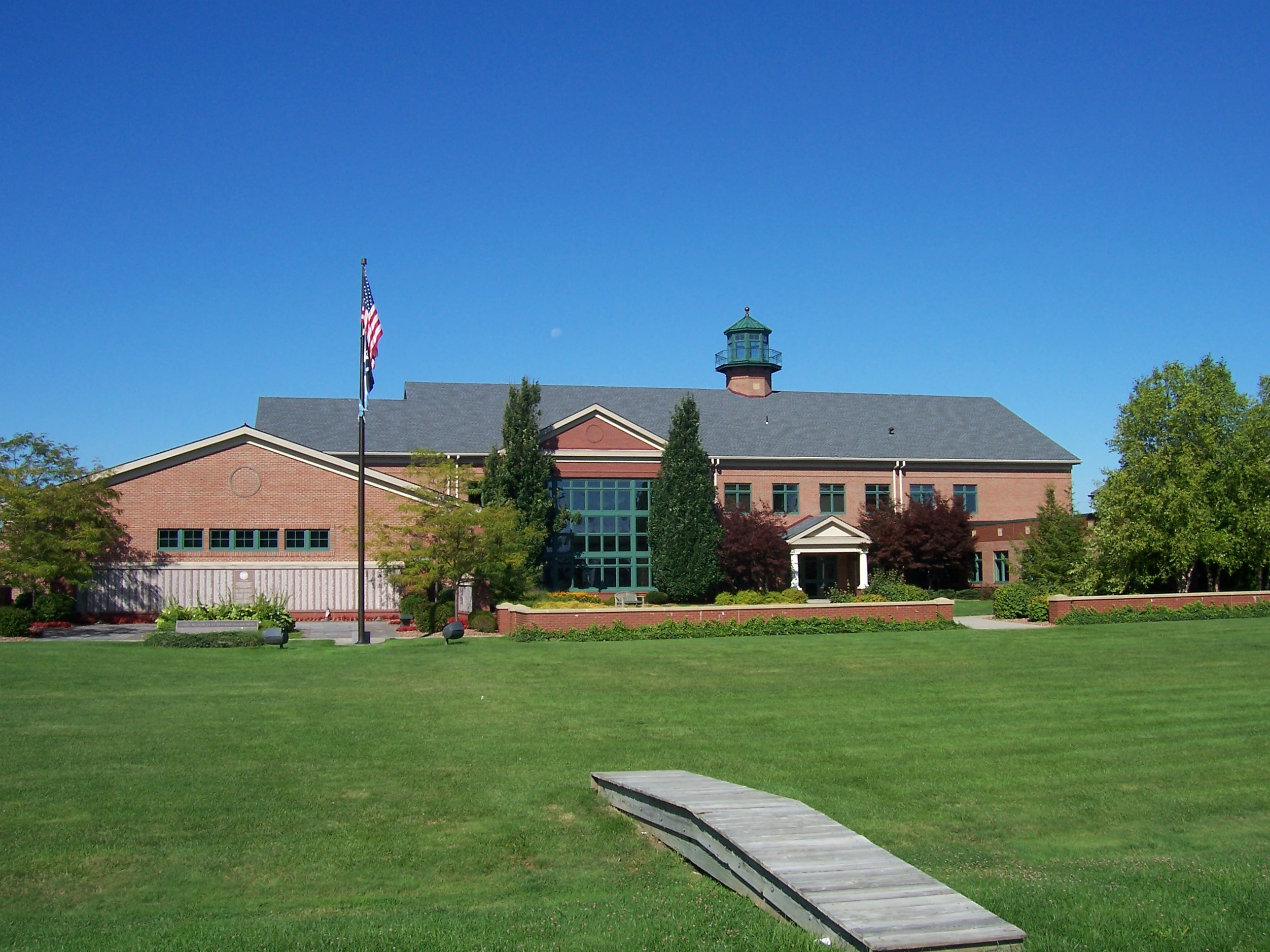
- Greece Town Hall

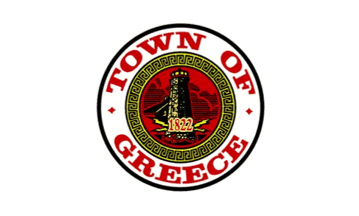
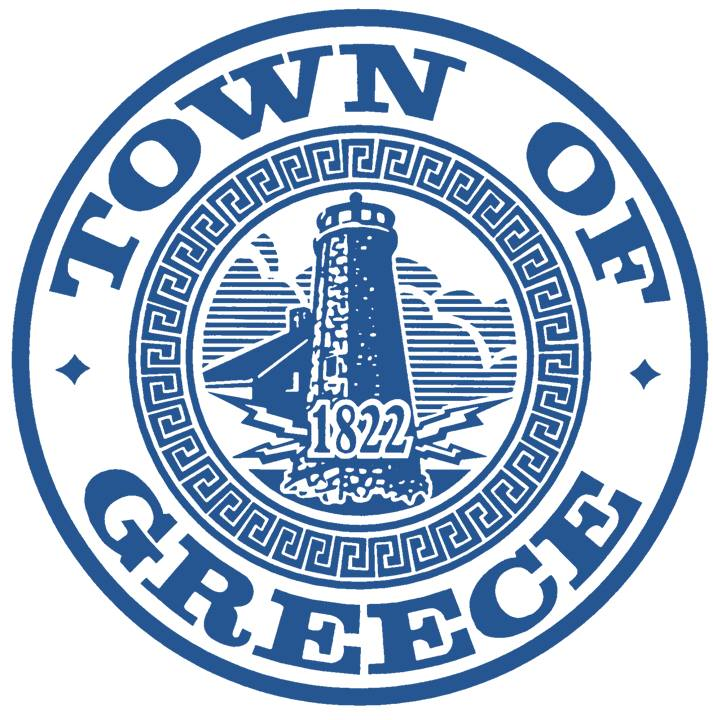
- Flag Seal
- Nickname: "Town of Good People"
- Motto: "Discover the Promise"
- Location in Monroe County and the state of New York

- Location of New York in the United States
- Coordinates: 43°12′34″N 77°41′43″W
- Country: United States
- State: New York
- County: Monroe
- Established: March 22, 1822; 204 years ago
- Named for: Greece

Government
  - Type: Town council
  - Supervisor: Jeffery L. McCann (D)
  - Councilmembers: List: Ward 1: David DiPonzio (R); Ward 2: Spencer Bernard (R); Ward 3: Amorette Miller (D); Ward 4: Rick Antelli Jr. (R)

Area
  - Total: 51.39 sq mi (133.11 km^{2})
  - Land: 47.52 sq mi (123.08 km^{2})
  - Water: 3.87 sq mi (10.03 km^{2})
- Elevation: 424 ft (129 m)

Population (2020)
  - Total: 96,926
  - Density: 2,040/sq mi (790/km^{2})
- Time zone: UTC-5 (EST)
  - Summer (DST): UTC-4 (EDT)
- ZIP Codes: 14612, 14615, 14616, 14626 (Greece); 14468 (Hilton); 14559 (Spencerport); 14606 (Gates)
- Area code: 585
- FIPS code: 36-055-30290
- Website: www.greeceny.gov

Greece is a town in Monroe County, New York, United States. A contiguous suburb of Rochester, it is the largest town by population in Monroe County and the second-largest municipality by population in the county, behind only the city of Rochester. As of the 2020 census, the town had a population of 96,926.

== History ==
=== Prehistory ===
Indigenous tribes had settled the area surrounding the Finger Lakes and moved northward to Lake Ontario, the Genesee River, Irondequoit Bay, and the ponds of Greece as early as 1300 AD. These people were Iroquoian tribes, early cousins of the Seneca, who traded with the Algonquin and Wendat (Huron) tribes. By about 1550 AD the Seneca, Mohawk, Oneida, Cayuga and Onondaga combined to form the Haudenosaunee Confederacy. (The Tuscarora would later migrate from the Carolinas and join the Confederacy.) They remained the dominant inhabitants of the region for the next 200 years.

=== European contact ===
The first European to visit the area was the French explorer La Salle, who visited in 1669. French and British soldiers passed through on multiple occasions during this time period as the two colonial powers struggled for control of the region. European settlers began to arrive in the area in the late 1790s, after the land was formally purchased from the Seneca people.

=== Early settlement ===
Following the conclusion of the American Revolutionary War in 1783, the new government was keen to enable its citizens to make use of the new vast regions to the west. In 1792, the first settlers in what would become the town of Greece arrived. William Hincher (a Revolutionary War veteran and a participant in Shays's Rebellion), his wife Mehitable, and their eight children built a cabin on the west bank of the Genesee River and purchased 627 acres (254 ha) of land in present-day Charlotte in 1794. Following William's death in 1817, a deed was created between Mehitable and the United States government for the establishment of the Charlotte–Genesee Lighthouse on the property, which was constructed in 1822.

In 1797, Kings Landing—the first European settlement and port west of the Genesee River—was established by the King and Granger families (natives of Suffield, Connecticut) on the bank of the Genesee in what is the present-day neighborhood of Charlotte in Rochester. The Grangers were related patrilineally to Gideon Granger, whose home in nearby Canandaigua is a museum. The Kings Landing settlement survived until it was decimated by malaria, then known as "Genesee Fever". In 1807 the settlement was revived by the seven Hanford brothers (and renamed "Hanford's Landing"), who constructed a mill, hotel and shipping center on the land.

In 1805, James and Sarah Latta (natives of Big Flats) purchased large plots of land in Charlotte for their family. The following year, their son Samuel built a home and warehouse on the property and was appointed customs agent for the Port of Charlotte by the President of the United States. The home built by Samuel Latta still stands at the intersection of Lake Ave and Latta Road.

=== Greece in the War of 1812 ===
On October 1, 1812, the British warship H.M.S. Royal George waded at the mouth of the Genesee River. Seventy British marines entered the harbor and seized a United States revenue cutter, a vessel named the Lady Murray, and a privately owned schooner. The following day the British returned as the riggings for the Lady Murray were kept in a storehouse at the Commercial Hotel operated by Erastus Spaulding (on a site near the present-day intersection of Stutson Street and River Street in Charlotte) and seized the missing equipment along with two gallons of whiskey.

On June 15, 1813, after learning that provisions for American troops were being stored at Charlotte, a fleet of eight British vessels under the command of Commodore James Yeo entered the Genesee River. 150 British sailors came ashore and seized the provisions along with a sloop which belonged to Erastus Spaulding. To prevent the people of Charlotte from alerting the militia, the British troops rounded them up and locked them overnight in a building owned by Frederick Bushnell and the Samuel Latta Home. A couple of men who managed to evade capture alerted the militia which was gathered at the Steamboat Hotel in Hanford's Landing (a distance of about 7 miles (11 km)). Under the command of Colonel Caleb Hopkins the militia marched to Charlotte and arrived just in time to see the British vessels sailing away.

On September 11, 1813, the American fleet under the command of Commodore Isaac Chauncey caught up with the British fleet at Braddock Bay, in the northwest corner of present-day Greece. At 2:30 pm offshore of Charlotte, the American fleet began closing in and came within three-quarters of a mile of the enemy ships, putting them within long gun range. The USS Pike and the USS Sylph bombarded the British fleet with cannon fire for 90 minutes, but due to the poor maneuverability of the American ships the British were able to escape.

On May 15, 1814, British ships anchored off the shore of Charlotte were spotted by Colonel Isaac Stone. Thirty-three men from Greece, Gates, Rochester and Brighton gathered at the Hanford Inn and marched through the night, arriving at the mouth of the Genesee River at dawn. Due to heavy fog the British believed a much larger force was gathered on the shore. Stone refused initial demands of truce, which were to surrender the provisions being stored at Charlotte. In response the British dispatched a gunboat to the harbor. Stone wanted to capture the boat, but his militia prematurely fired their cannon. The British fired 15-20 shots in return, striking a warehouse. That afternoon, General Peter Porter and the militias under the commands of Colonel Caleb Hopkins, Colonel John Atchinson and Captain Frederick Rose (600-800 men in total) arrived in Charlotte. The British sent a second truce and threatened to land an army and 400 warriors from Tecumseh's confederacy if they did not comply. General Porter again refused the demands and warned that if the British landed "they would be taken care of". Not knowing how many men were defending Charlotte, Yeo and his ships sailed away on the morning of May 16, 1814.

=== Establishment of the Town of Greece ===
During the late 18th century, counties were established to provide support to the western frontier of New York state. By 1789 Ontario and Genesee counties had been established, and in 1797 a region called Northampton had been designated in the eastern portion of Genesee County on land that had been acquired through the Phelps & Gorham land purchase. Northampton encompassed the area of present-day Parma, Riga, Gates, Ogden, Chili, and Greece.

In 1808, Northampton was divided into four towns. The area that is present-day Gates and Greece maintained the name Northampton until the town of Gates was formally established in 1813. In 1821, Monroe County was created from land of both Ontario and Genesee counties. On March 22, 1822, the state government passed legislation which, effective April 1, 1822, divided Gates into the modern towns of Gates and Greece. The town of Greece received a larger percentage of the land because it was believed that most of the northern portion of the town was unusable swamp land. The name Greece was selected in support of the contemporary Greek War of Independence from the Ottoman Empire.

=== 1822-present ===
The portion of the Erie Canal which passes through the town of Greece was completed by 1822. The hamlet of "South Greece" (present-day Henpeck Park at the intersection of Ridgeway Avenue and Elmgrove Road) was established to facilitate the needs of travelers and workers on the canal. Some of the stone masons who came from Europe to help build the canal remained in the area and are thought to be responsible for the construction of cobblestone homes which are somewhat unique to the Central and Western New York region. Three such structures remain in the town as of 2024, including the Covert-Brodie-Pollok House on North Greece Road.

Throughout the 19th century Greece was primarily a farming community with a population that hovered around 5,000 people, and additional hamlets such as North Greece, West Greece, Greece Center, Barnard Crossing and Paddy Hill were formed. Much of the economic activity in the town centered on the port of Charlotte, which was incorporated as a village within the town of Greece in 1869, and facilitated up to 100 ships in the port and along the Genesee River in a day.

The town’s proximity to Lake Ontario made it a famous vacation destination in the latter portion of the 19th century. The Ontario Beach Amusement Park (operating from 1884-1919), located on the site of the present-day Ontario Beach Park, was known as the "Coney Island of the West". Another amusement park at Manitou Beach (operating from the 1890s to the 1920s) was connected to Charlotte via the Grand View Beach Railway, and grand resort hotels such as the Manitou Hotel, Crescent Beach Hotel and the Odenbach Hotel sprang up along the route to accommodate visitors. The Dentzel Menagerie Carousel, a reminder of the amusement parks' heyday, still operates at Ontario Beach Park.

It was around this same time that the economy of Greece began to shift from agriculture to industry. In 1891, George Eastman opened the first Kodak plant in the southeast area of town (at the intersection of Mount Read Boulevard and West Ridge Road) that would eventually become known as Kodak Park. Kodak would eventually become the largest employer in the greater Rochester region, and its success is directly responsible for the town's growth. As the city of Rochester expanded, it annexed large portions of the town. Charlotte was annexed in 1916 (creating the city's 23rd Ward), and the industrial district of Kodak Park was annexed in 1918.

This economic shift continued steadily throughout the interwar period. It was during this time that weather extremes, such as a severe freeze in 1934 which destroyed many of the town's orchards, resulted in a devastating loss of crops that many farmers were not able to recover from. As a result, much of the farm land was sold for real estate development. Due to its proximity to Kodak Park, the town transformed as residential construction to support soldiers returning from World War II attracted large numbers of factory workers and their families to Greece. The population grew rapidly during this time, from roughly 15,000 people in 1940 to almost 50,000 by 1960, and by 1967 the population was approaching 75,000.

== Geography ==
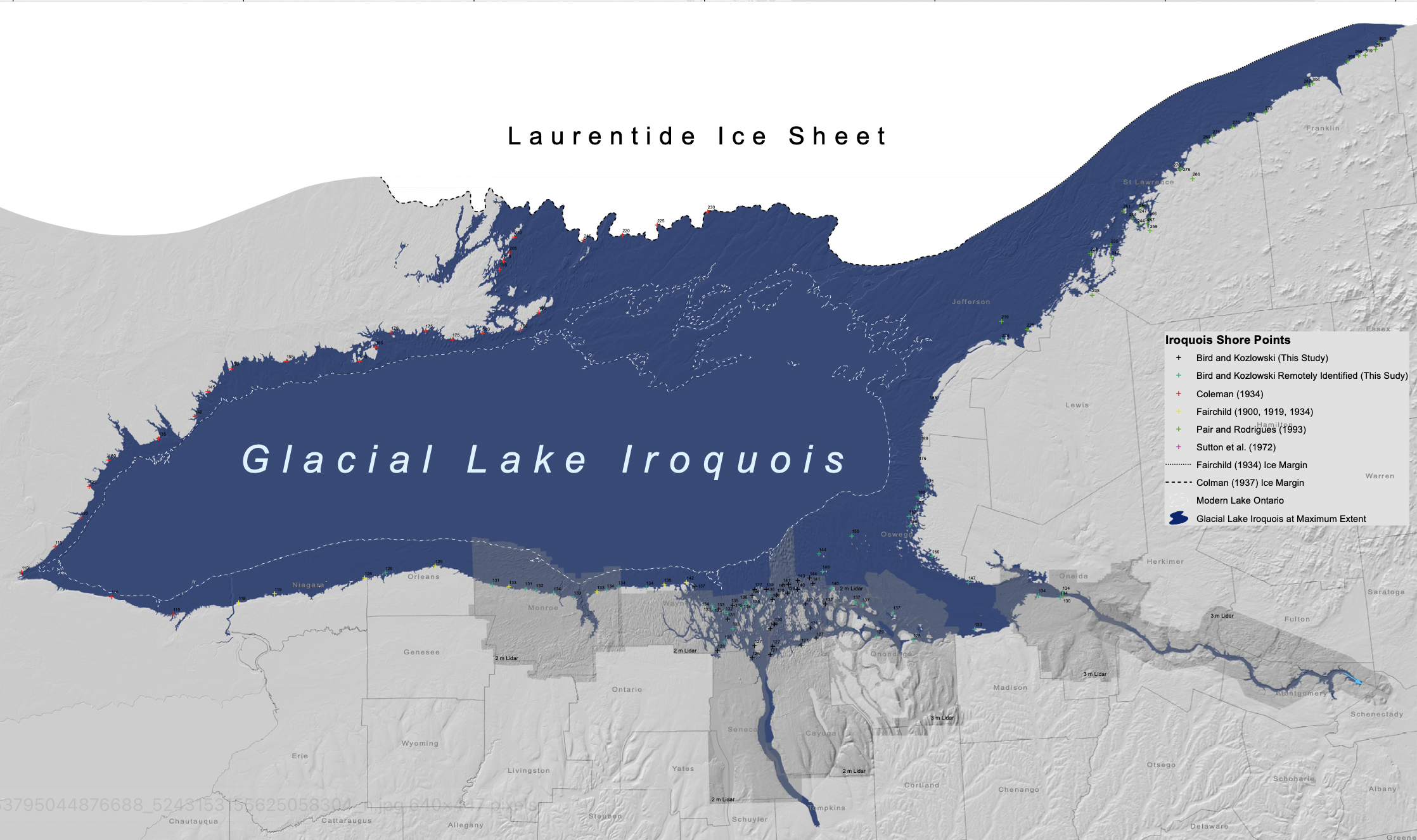
Water distribution of glacial Lake Iroquois in comparison with present Lake Ontario

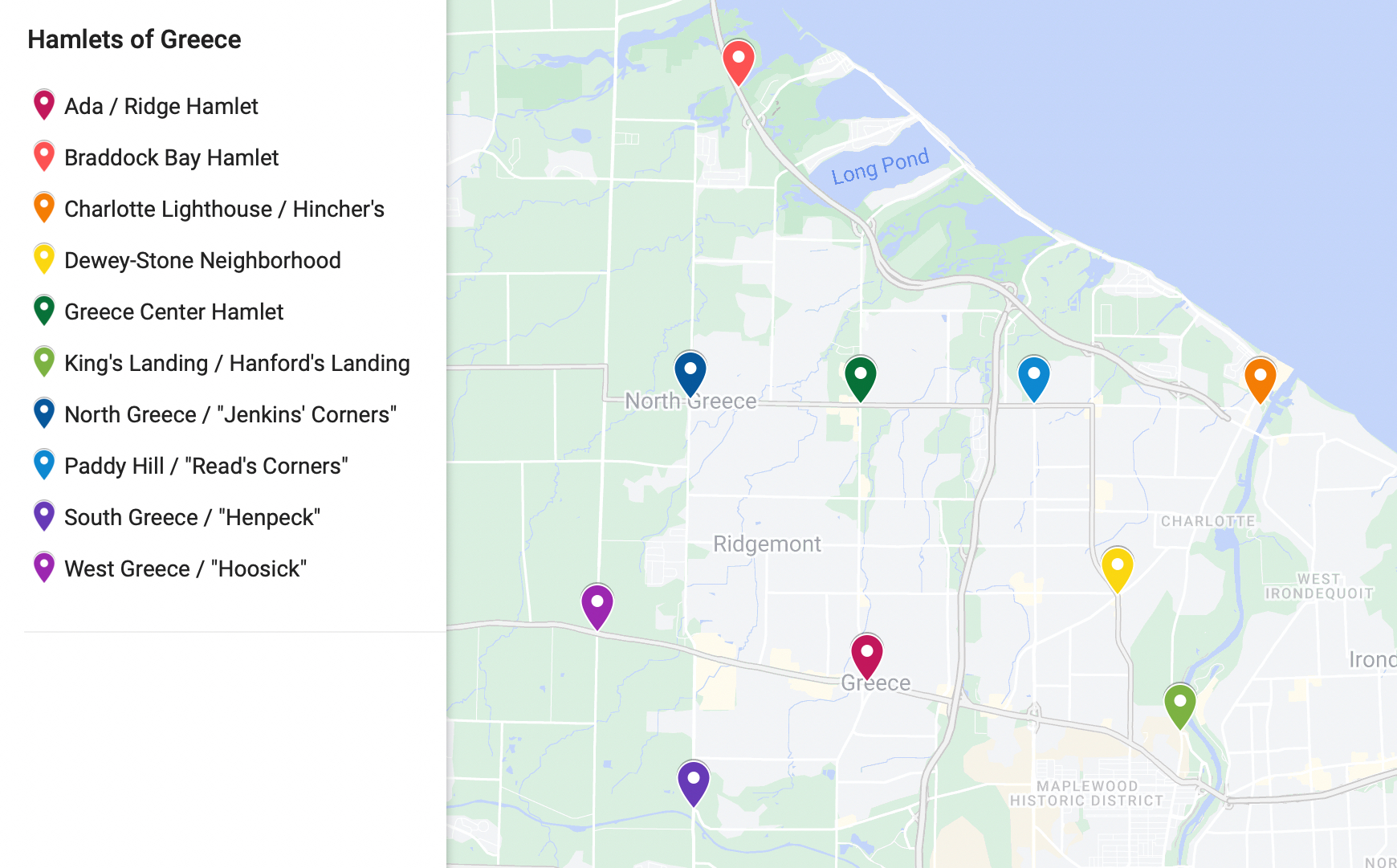
Map showing the locations of historic hamlets within the Town of Greece, NY

=== The Ridge ===
At the end of the last ice age, around 11,000 BCE, much of the land making up the town of Greece was covered by a prehistoric lake which was created by glacial ice sheets that prevented the lake from draining via the St Lawrence River as it does today. This lake, known as Lake Iroquois, was in essence an enlargement of present-day Lake Ontario. As the glaciers receded, the waters of Lake Iroquois began to drop to modern levels, leaving behind a ridge of land roughly 7 to 7.5 miles (11.3 to 12.1 km) from the current shoreline and rising to about 400 feet (120 m) above sea level, roughly 160 feet (49 m) above Lake Ontario. The soil deposited in these receded regions was rich and fertile for agricultural purposes. This ridge had long been used by Native Americans as a footpath and to this day it is the main thoroughfare of the town, known to locals colloquially as "the Ridge".

Sometime between 1801 and 1804, anticipating that the Ridge would become a major thoroughfare, Abel Rowe opened a tavern on Ridge Road. For some time it was one of only two buildings on the Ridge between the Genesee River and Lewiston (on the Niagara River). During the War of 1812 the Ridge served as an important route for transporting troops and supplies across Western New York, and in 1813 New York State appropriated $5,000 for improvements to the roadway. In 1816, stagecoaches began traveling on Ridge Road and would continue to be a major mode of transportation for decades. More taverns and general stores sprang up, often near the hamlets that formed at various points along the Ridge.

By the middle of the 19th century, Ridge Road was lined with prosperous farms and mansions such as the Todd Mansion (at the intersection of West Ridge Road and North Ave) and the Upton Mansion (present day Ridgemont Country Club). In the 1860s a portion of Ridge Road between Long Pond Road and Elmgrove Road was planked, similar to a boardwalk. However, the majority of the Ridge remained a dirt road until the beginning of the 20th century.

In 1900, Ridge Road became New York State Route 104, and money was appropriated for its improvement. As automobiles gained popularity there was less need for many of the taverns and hotels along the Ridge. Blacksmiths and carriage makers made way for gas stations and repair shops. Route 104 was rebuilt in 1926 to better accommodate travel by motorcar. By the 1940s thousands of Greece residents were traveling along the Ridge daily to work at Kodak, often causing it to become congested. The Ridge was widened in 1956 (four lanes), again in 1978 (six lanes), and again in 2008 (six to eight lanes, plus medians). The last of the early taverns on the Ridge, Streb's Steak House, was torn down in 2013. Today shopping plazas, chain restaurants and car dealerships line both sides of Ridge Road.

=== Present day ===
The town is located west of the Genesee River in central Monroe County, and is bordered by the city of Rochester to the east, the town of Gates to the south, the towns of Parma and Ogden to the west, and Lake Ontario to the north. New York State Route 104 (Ridge Road) crosses the southern part of the town, passing through the town center and leading east into Rochester and west 12 miles (19 km) to Clarkson. State Route 18 (Latta Road) passes through North Greece, leading east and then south into Rochester and northwest 5 miles (8 km) to Hilton. The Lake Ontario State Parkway runs through the northern part of town, about a mile inland from the shore of the lake. Interstate 390 runs north-south through the eastern part of town.

According to the U.S. Census Bureau, the town of Greece has a total area of 51.4 square miles (133 km^{2}), of which 47.5 square miles (123 km^{2}) are land and 3.9 square miles (10.1 km^{2}), or 7.57%, are water. Wetlands and numerous ponds such as Cranberry Pond, Long Pond and Braddock Bay cover the northernmost portion of the town of Greece along the shoreline of Lake Ontario. This area has the lowest elevation in the town, sitting 243 feet (74 m) above sea level. The highest elevation in the town of Greece is south of Ridgeway Avenue along Interstate 390, the current location of BJ's Wholesale Club, sitting 558 feet (170 m) above sea level.

== Demographics ==
Historical population
Census	Pop.	Note	%±
1830	2,574		—
1840	3,669		42.5%
1850	4,219		15.0%
1860	4,147		−1.7%
1870	4,314		4.0%
1880	4,848		12.4%
1890	5,145		6.1%
1900	5,579		8.4%
1910	7,777		39.4%
1920	3,350		−56.9%
1930	12,113		261.6%
1940	14,925		23.2%
1950	25,508		70.9%
1960	48,670		90.8%
1970	75,136		54.4%
1980	81,367		8.3%
1990	90,106		10.7%
2000	94,141		4.5%
2010	96,095		2.1%
2020	96,926		0.9%
2023 (est.)	94,591	▼	−2.4%
U.S. Decennial Census

As of the census of 2020, there were 96,926 people, 43,885 households, and 25,748 families residing in the town. The population density was 2,040.54 inhabitants per square mile. There were 45,948 housing units at an average density of 967.3 per square mile (373.5/km^{2}). The racial makeup of the town was 75.4% White (Non-Hispanic), 8.7% Black or African American, 3.5% Asian, 0.5% from other races, 4.4% from two or more races. Hispanic or Latino of any race were 7.5% of the population.

J & F Fetzner Carriage and Blacksmith shop on West Ridge Road, by Raymond Getzner, 1877

There were 43,885 households; 54.9% were married couples living together, 13.9% had a female householder with no husband present and 25.1% of households were non-families. The average household size was 2.2 people. The median value of owner-occupied housing units was $185,100.

In the town, the population was spread out, with 17.1% under the age of 18, 6.7% from 18 to 24, 25.5% from 25 to 44, 26.8% from 45 to 64, and 23.8% who were 65 years of age or older. The median age was 46.2 years. Males comprised 48.9% of the population versus 51.1% for females.

The median income for a household in the town was $64,867, the median income for a family was $90,950 and the median income for married families was $101,340. The median income for non-family households was $39,086. The median income for full-time working males was $61,166 versus $52,666 for females. The median income for all males working part-time or full-time was $46,504 versus $33,147 for females. The per capita income for the town was $39,510. About 10.39% of the population were below the poverty line, including 9.1% of those under age 18 and 8.1% of those age 65 or over.

== Government ==
The town is governed by a town board consisting of a supervisor and four council members. The supervisor is elected by all registered voters in the town, while council members are elected by and represent one of four wards. Supervisors are elected for four-year terms, and by town law may not serve for more than twelve years consecutively, after which the individual is ineligible to serve for four years. Councilpersons are elected for two-year terms, and may serve for a maximum of ten consecutive years in that position. The Town of Greece supervisors up untll William F. Schmitt were elected or appointed to the role of the town supervisor and served one year terms it wasn't until April of 1932 when the law was finally enacted and codified into law and it is record in to Laws of the State of New York passed at the sessions of the Legislature 1932 v.1-2 Chapter 634 which became law on April 8, 1932 defines Town Law and roles of the town government that all towns in the state of New York, and then in 1999 under Town Supervisor John T. Auberger the town board voted to amend the town code for the supervisor to be three consecutive terms (maximum 12 consecutive years) and other changes are noted in Town of Greece Code of Town of Greece supervisor.

The town board's practice of opening each meeting with a prayer, which started in 1999, was legally challenged in 2008, on the grounds that all prayers offered to open the meetings had, until that point, been Christian ones. The United States District Court, Western District of New York, ruled in favor of the town in 2010, and the Second Circuit Court of Appeals reversed that decision in 2012, setting the stage for a 2014 decision by the Supreme Court of the United States which ruled in favor of the town (see Town of Greece v. Galloway).

State and Federal Representatives
Name	Term	Representation	District
Josh Jensen	2020–Present	New York State Assembly Representative	134th Assembly district
Jeremy Cooney	2020–Present	New York State Senatorial Representative	56th Senatorial District
Joseph Morelle	November 6, 2018–Present	United States Congressional Representative	25th Congressional District

=== List of town supervisors ===
From 1822–1931, supervisors generally served one-year terms. From 1932–1999, supervisors served two-year terms. Since 2000, supervisors have served four-year terms.

Table of supervisors by era
Era	Term length	Years covered	Supervisors
One-year terms	1 year	1822–1931	54
Two-year terms	2 years	1932–1999	8
Four-year terms	4 years	2000–present	3

Supervisors (one-year terms, 1822–1931)
No.	Supervisor	Term	Notes
1	John Williams	1822	
2	Frederick Bushnell	1823–1825	
3	Silas Walker	1826–1829	
4	John Williams	1830	Second non-consecutive term
5	Elijah Hughitt	1831	
6	Giles H. Holden	1832–1833	
7	Asa Rowe	1834–1835	
8	Samuel Bradley	1836–1838	
9	Lyman Langworthy	1839–1841	
10	Asa Rowe	1842	Third term
11	Abdial Carpenter	1843	
12	George C. Salter	1844	
13	George C. Latta	1845	
14	James S. Stone	1846–1847	
15	Abdial Carpenter	1848	Second term
16	George C. Latta	1849	Second term
17	Lyman Langworthy	1850	Fourth term
18	Levi H. Parrish	1851–1852	
19	James S. Stone	1853	Third term
20	Elias Avery	1854–1855	
21	Erastus Walker	1856–1857	
22	Joshua Eaton	1858	
23	Alamander Wilder	1859	
24	Peter Larkin	1861–1862	
25	Harry A. Olmsted	1863	
26	Nelson Lewis	1864–1869	
27	Simon Butts	1870–1871	
28	Peter Larkin	1872	Third term
29	Erastus Walker	1873	Third term
30	David Todd	1874–1875	
31	Peter Larkin	1876	Fourth term
32	Alanson P. Britton	1877–1878	
33	John Lowden	1879–1880	
34	John Kintz	1881	
35	Erastus Benedict	1882–1883	
36	Alanson P. Britton	1884–1885	Third and fourth terms
37	Lucien A. Rowe	1886	
38	Alanson P. Britton	1887	Fifth term
39	John M. Lowdon	1888–1889	
40	Thomas Eddy	1890	
41	Joseph R. Beaty	1891–1892	
42	Alanson P. Britton	1893	Sixth term
43	James B. Castle	1894–1897	
44	Edward Frisbee	1898 – February 27, 1901	
45	William T. Whelehan	March 1 – March 27, 1901	Acting supervisor
46	Charles H. Banker	March 27 – April 24, 1901	Acting supervisor
47	Alanson P. Britton	April 29 – December 31, 1901	Seventh term
48	Frank Vance	1902 – February 14, 1903	
49	Willis N. Britton	February 25 – December 31, 1903	
50	Frank Truesdale	1904–1909	
51	Frank Dobson	1910–1915	
52	Herbert J. Paine	1916–1921	
53	Frank J. Mitchell	1922–1927	
54	William F. Schmitt	1928–1931	

Supervisors (two-year terms, 1932–1999)
No.	Supervisor	Term	Notes
55	William F. Schmitt	1932–1934	Fifth term overall
56	Gordon A. Howe	1934–1960	Served 13 consecutive two-year terms
57	Vincent L. Tofany	1960–1964	
58	George W. Badgerow	1964–1970	
59	Fred J. Eckert	1970–1972	Left office to run for the New York State Senate
60	Donald J. Riley	1973–1989	Eight two-year terms and one partial term in 1973
61	Roger W. Boily	1989–1997	
62	John T. Auberger	1998–1999	First term; term length changed to four years beginning in 2000

Supervisors (four-year terms, 2000–present)
No.	Supervisor	Term	Notes
62	John T. Auberger	2000–2013	Served three four-year terms after initial two-year term
63	William D. Reilich	2014–2025	Served three four-year terms
64	Jeffery L. McCann	2026–2028	Term shortened to three years to synchronize the new election cycle beginning in 2028

Some historical text about the supervisors.

== Education ==
Education in the Town of Greece dates back to at least 1798 when the residents of then Northampton elected the first school commissioner. In 1823, a year after its founding, the Town of Greece was divided into Common School Districts. By the end of the 19th century the town had seventeen Common School Districts, as well as two Joint School Districts on the Greece / Parma town border. During this time the districts were repeatedly renumbered and restructured as the population of students in the town grew. Common School District #15 - Barnard School is the only building still functioning as a school. It is currently occupied by Derech HaTorah, a private Jewish school.

Centralization of the Common School Districts began in 1928 with the consolidation of districts 3, 11 and 16 which were combined to form Greece Central School District #1 - Hoover Drive. Greece was the first centralized school district in Monroe County and the thirteenth centralized school district in New York State.

As the population expanded rapidly following World War II, the Greece Central School district grew to accommodate its growing number of students. The first secondary school in town following the annexation of Charlotte was Olympia High School which opened in 1959. Prior to the construction of Olympia the only secondary schools serving residents of the Town of Greece were Charlotte High School and John Marshall High School in the City of Rochester. Over the next 10 years two more secondary schools would follow; Arcadia High School (1963), and Athena High School (1969). The Hoover Drive School was eventually transformed to the Odyssey Academy before relocating to the site of the former Cardinal Mooney High School in 2012 following the consolidation of Apollo Middle School — which had previously occupied the Cardinal Mooney building — and Olympia High School.

Today there are three school districts serving the Town of Greece: the Greece Central School District, the Hilton Central School District and the Spencerport Central School District. The schools of the Greece Central School District educate approximately 11,000 students. Excluding New York City, the Greece Central School District is the seventh largest school district in the State of New York. The post-elementary schools have Classical Greek names and mascots. Private sources of education within the Town of Greece include the Greece Montessori School, Rochester Academy Charter High School, Dorech HaTorah Jewish School and St. Lawrence Catholic School.

Greece Central School District schools
Motto: "One Vision, One Team, One Greece"
Elementary schools	Grades	Middle & high schools	Grades
Autumn Lane	PreK-2	Arcadia Middle School	6-8
Brookside	K-5	Arcadia High School	9-12
Buckman Heights	3-5	Athena Middle School	6-8
Craig Hill	3-5	Athena High School	9-12
English Village	K-2	Odyssey	6-12
Greece Community Early Learning Center	PreK-2	Olympia	6-12
Holmes Road	PreK-2	Phoenix Academy	7-12
Lakeshore	3-5		
Long Ridge	K-5		
Paddy Hill	K-5		
Pine Brook	K-5		

== Notable landmarks ==
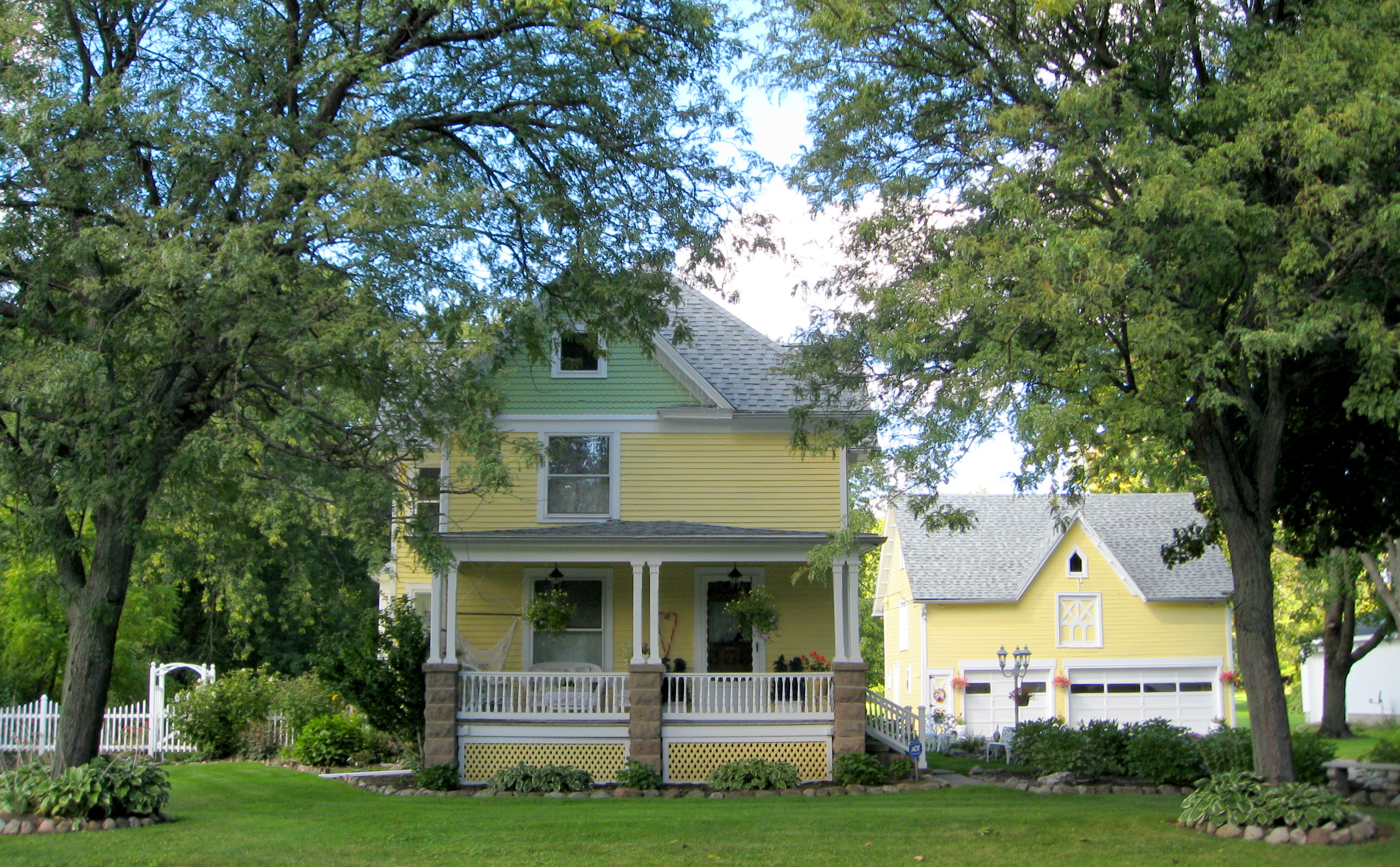
The William Payne House at 505 Elmgrove Road. Added to the National Register of Historic Places and designated Town of Greece Landmark in 2012.

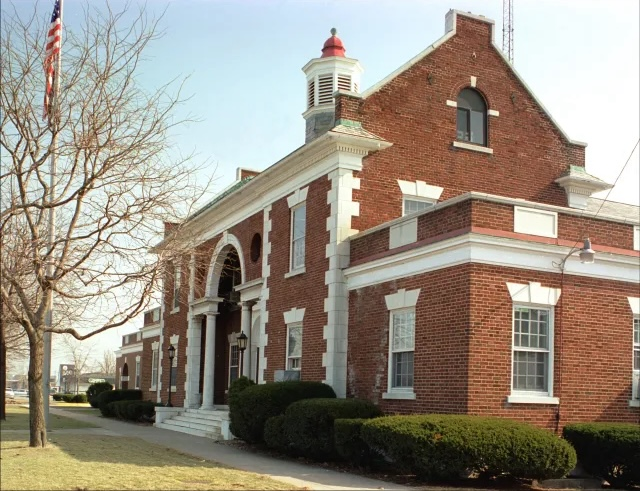
The lost Town of Greece Memorial Town Hall which stood at the southeast corner of the West Ridge Road / Long Pond Road intersection from 1919-1999. Added to the National Register of Historic Places in 1998.

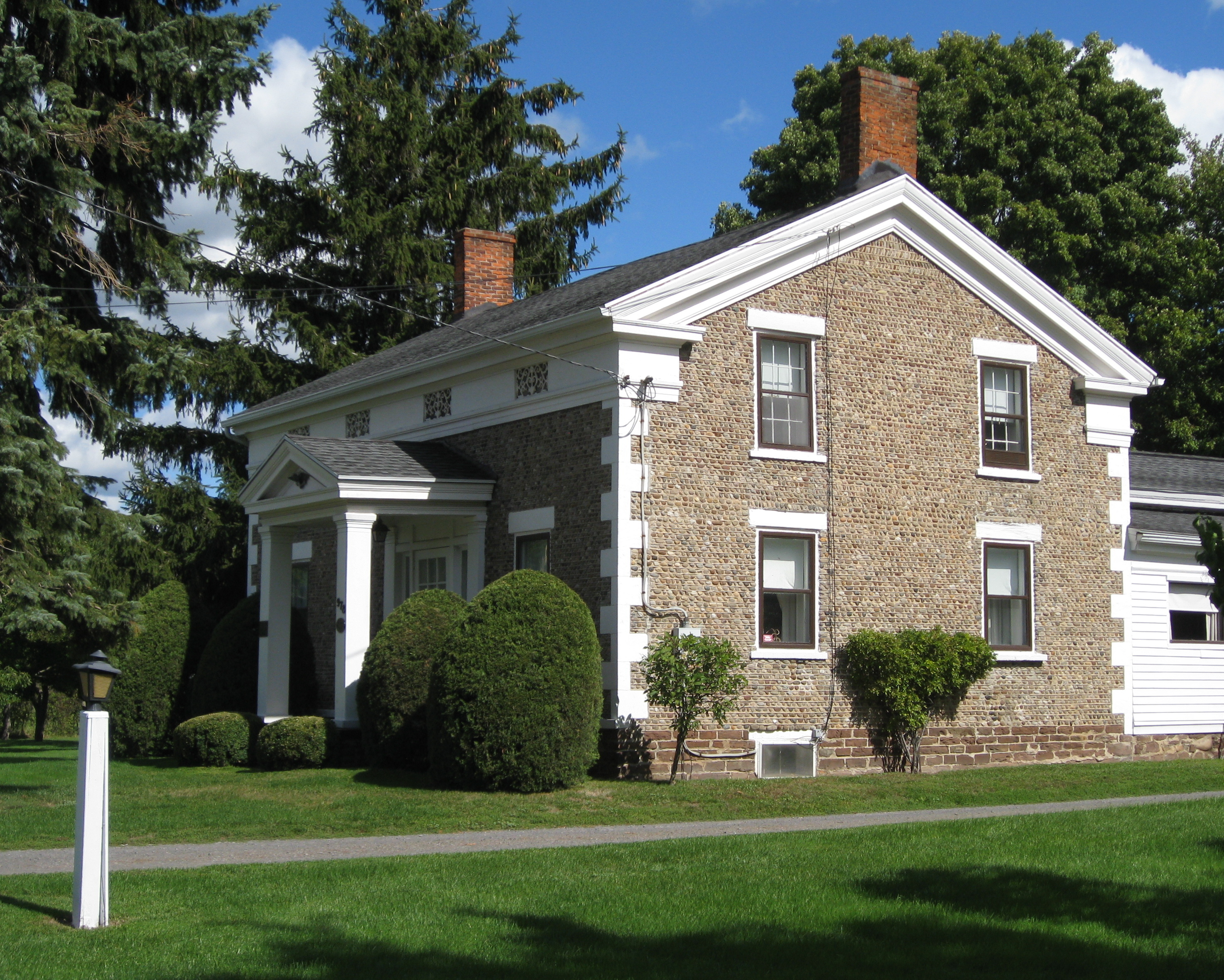
The William Covert Cobblestone Farmhouse (also known as The Covert-Brodie-Pollok House) at 978 North Greece Road. Added to the National Register of Historic Places in 1995. Designated Town of Greece Landmark in 1998.

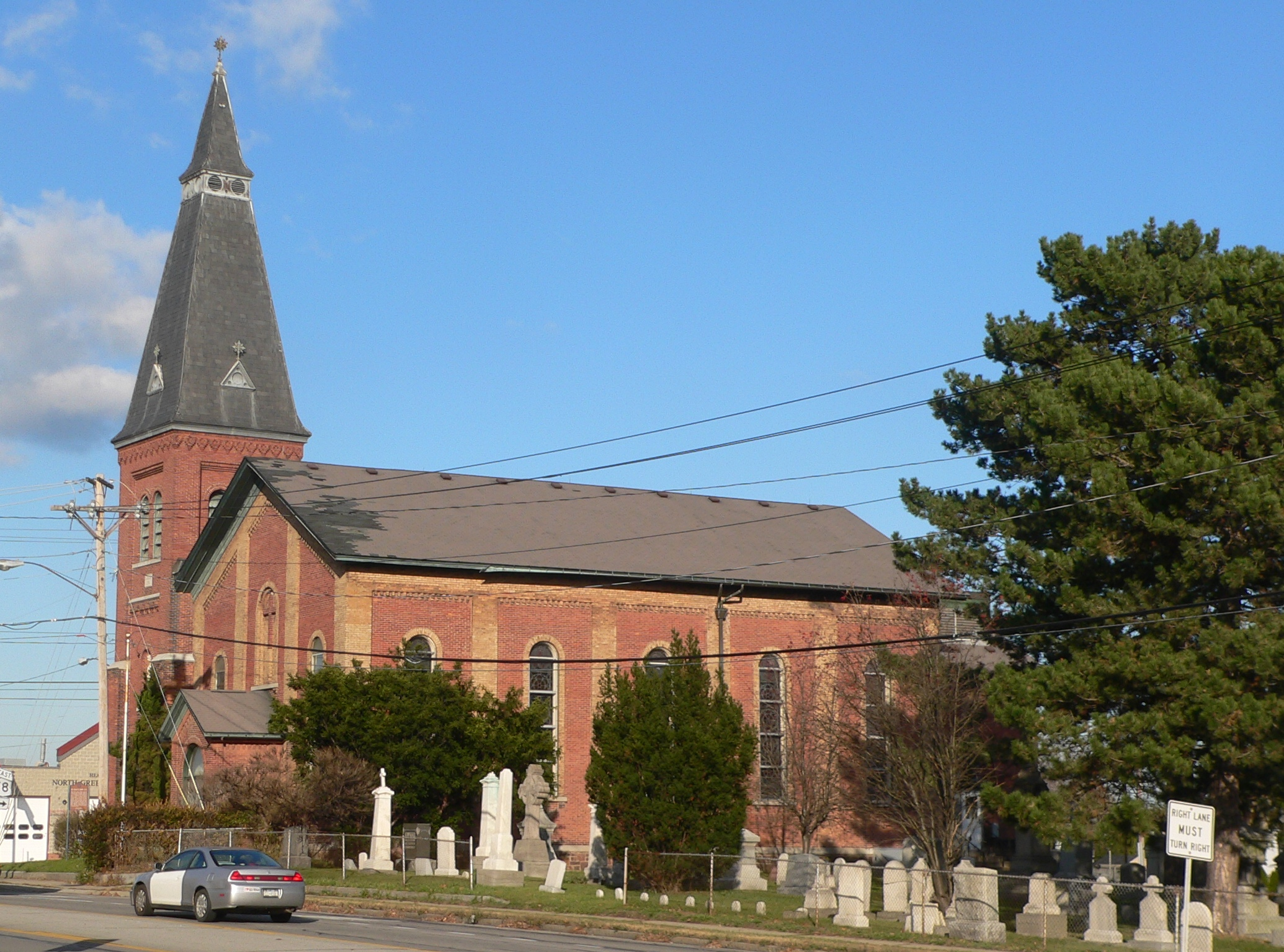
Our Mother of Sorrows Roman Catholic Church Complex (ca. 1858–1878) at the intersection of Latta Road and Mt Read Blvd. Added to the National Register of Historic Places in 1989.

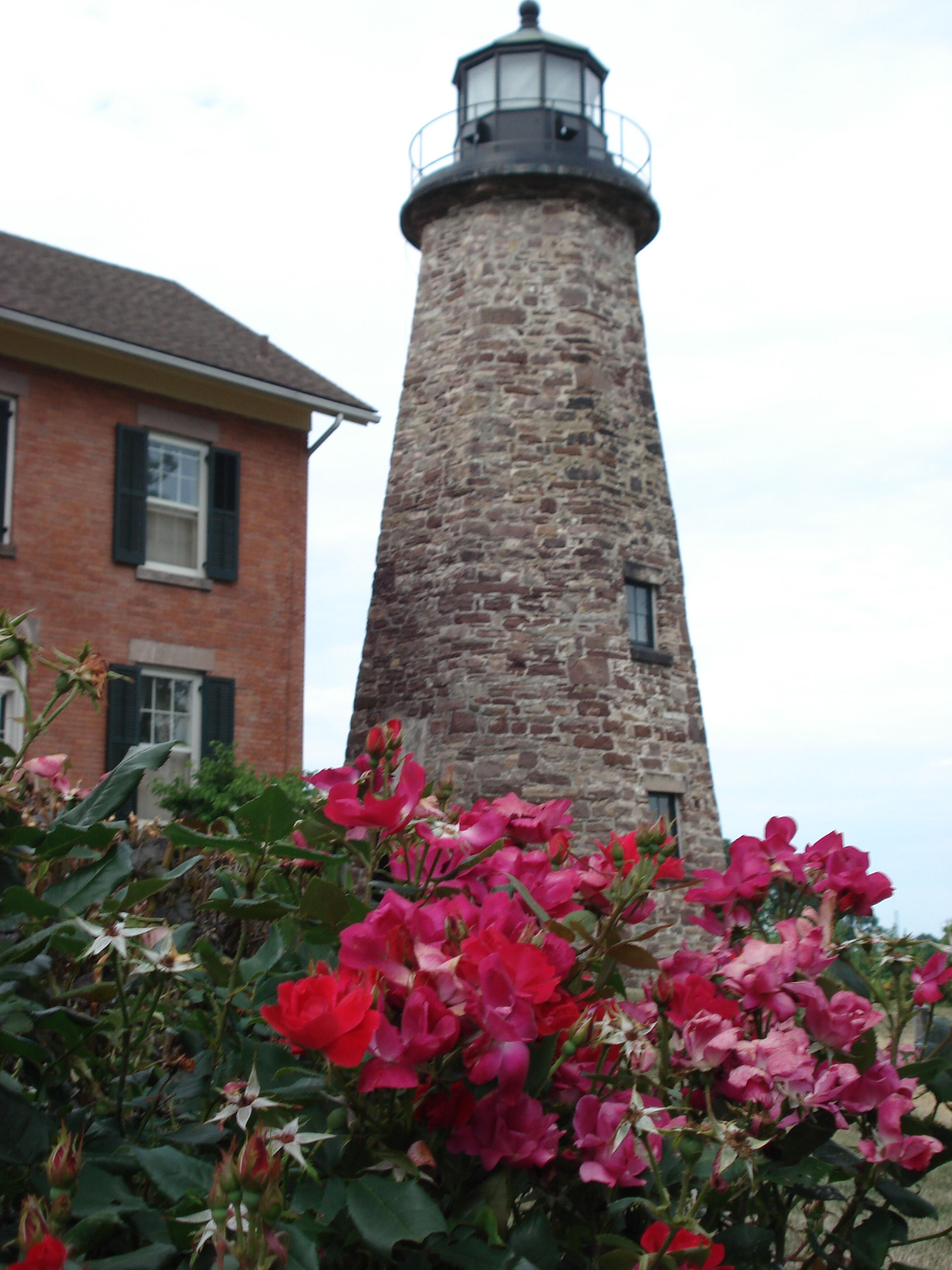
The Charlotte-Genesee Lighthouse, though no longer within the Town of Greece boundaries, is featured on the Official Seal of the Town of Greece.

== Notable people ==
- Frank Beaty, professional basketball player
- Jason Bonsignore, professional ice hockey player
- Jessie Bonstelle, actress and theatre producer
- Michele Brekke, first female NASA flight director
- Ryan Callahan, professional ice hockey player
- Jennifer Cody, actress
- Fred Eckert, politician and diplomat
- Josh Jensen, politician
- Jason McElwain, amateur athlete and public speaker
- Andrew McKay, professional soccer player
- Enoch Pardee, doctor and politician; 18th mayor of Oakland, California
- Joe Robach, politician
- Fred Slater, lawyer and politician
- Blanche Stuart Scott, aviation pioneer (born on a farm on the Greece / Gates border)
- Marcus Wilson, professional American football player

== See also ==
- 1978 Holiday Inn fire
