= William Covert Cobblestone Farmhouse =

Historic house in New York, United States

- U.S. National Register of Historic Places
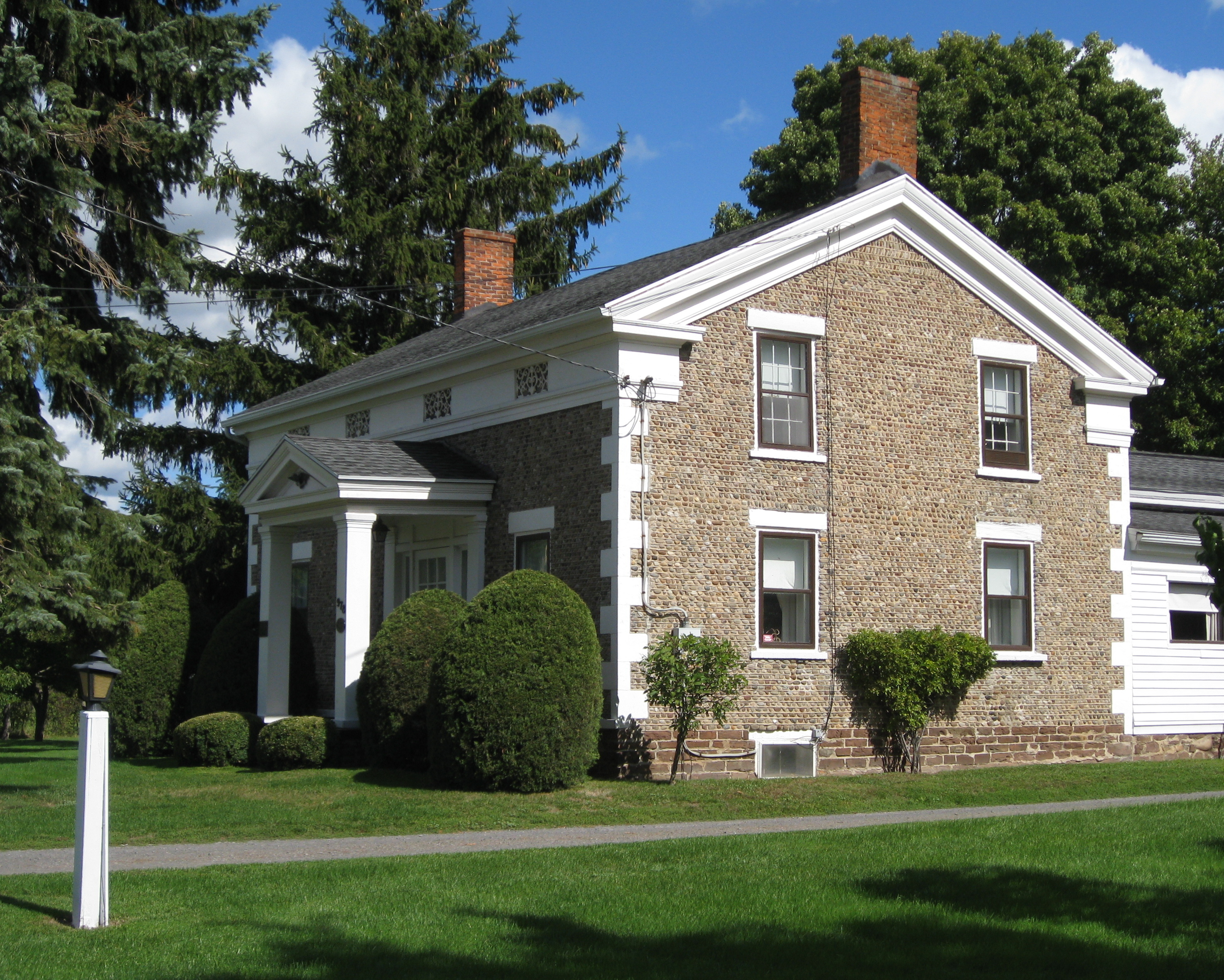

- Location within New York Location within the United States
- Interactive map showing the location of William Covert Cobblestone House
- Location: 978 N. Greece Rd., Greece, New York
- Coordinates: 43°13′48″N 77°43′51″W
- Area: 15 acres (6.1 ha)
- Built: 1832
- Architect: William Covert
- Architectural style: Greek Revival
- MPS: Cobblestone Architecture of New York State MPS
- NRHP reference No.: 95001280
- Added to NRHP: November 07, 1995

William Covert Cobblestone Farmhouse, also known as the Covert-Brodie-Pollok House, is a historic home located at Greece, New York. It is a Greek Revival style cobblestone farmhouse built about 1832. It is constructed of medium-sized field cobbles and is one of four surviving cobblestone buildings in Greece. The property includes a contributing cobblestone well with pump.

It was listed on the National Register of Historic Places in 1995.
