= Greece Memorial Hall =

- U.S. National Register of Historic Places
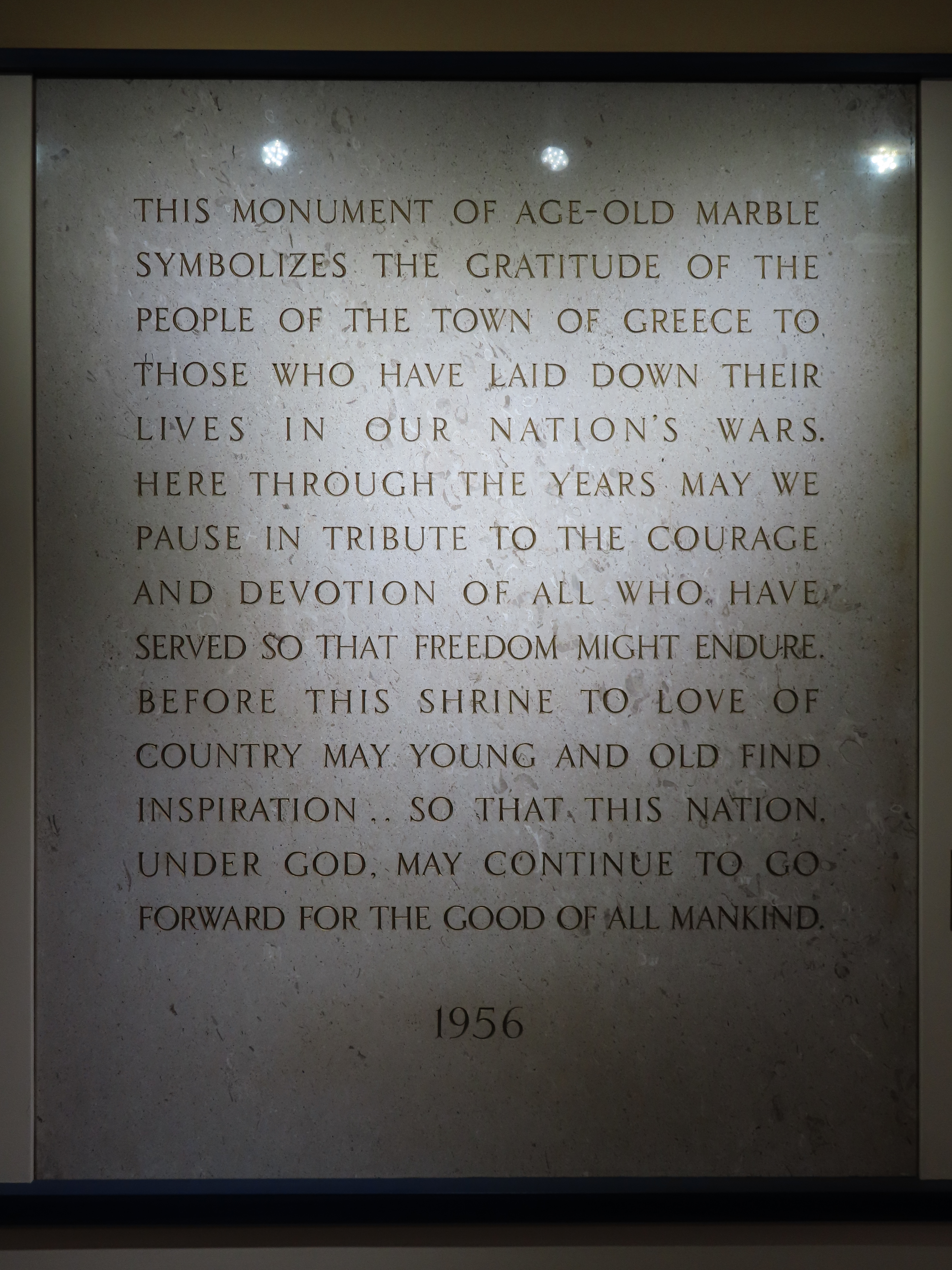

- Location within New York Location within the United States
- Nearest city: Greece, New York
- Coordinates: 43°12′34″N 77°41′43″W
- Area: 2.5 acres (1.0 ha)
- Built: 1919
- Architect: Crandall & Strobel
- Architectural style: Colonial Revival
- Demolished: 1999
- NRHP reference No.: 98000395
- Added to NRHP: April 23, 1998

Greece Memorial Hall, also known as Greece Town Hall, was a historic town hall building located at Greece in Monroe County, New York. It consisted of a two-story, side-gabled main building constructed in 1919; two 1 1/2-story flanking wings built in 1936, and a two-part addition constructed in 1955. The main building featured a 1 1/2-story protruding portico with a stone arch flanked by two open oculi and supported by two stone Tuscan columns.

The hall memorialized the 288 young men from Greece who served in World War I, thirteen of whom died in battle.

It was listed on the National Register of Historic Places in 1998 and demolished in 1999.
