= Our Mother of Sorrows Roman Catholic Church Complex =

Historic church in New York, United States

- U.S. National Register of Historic Places
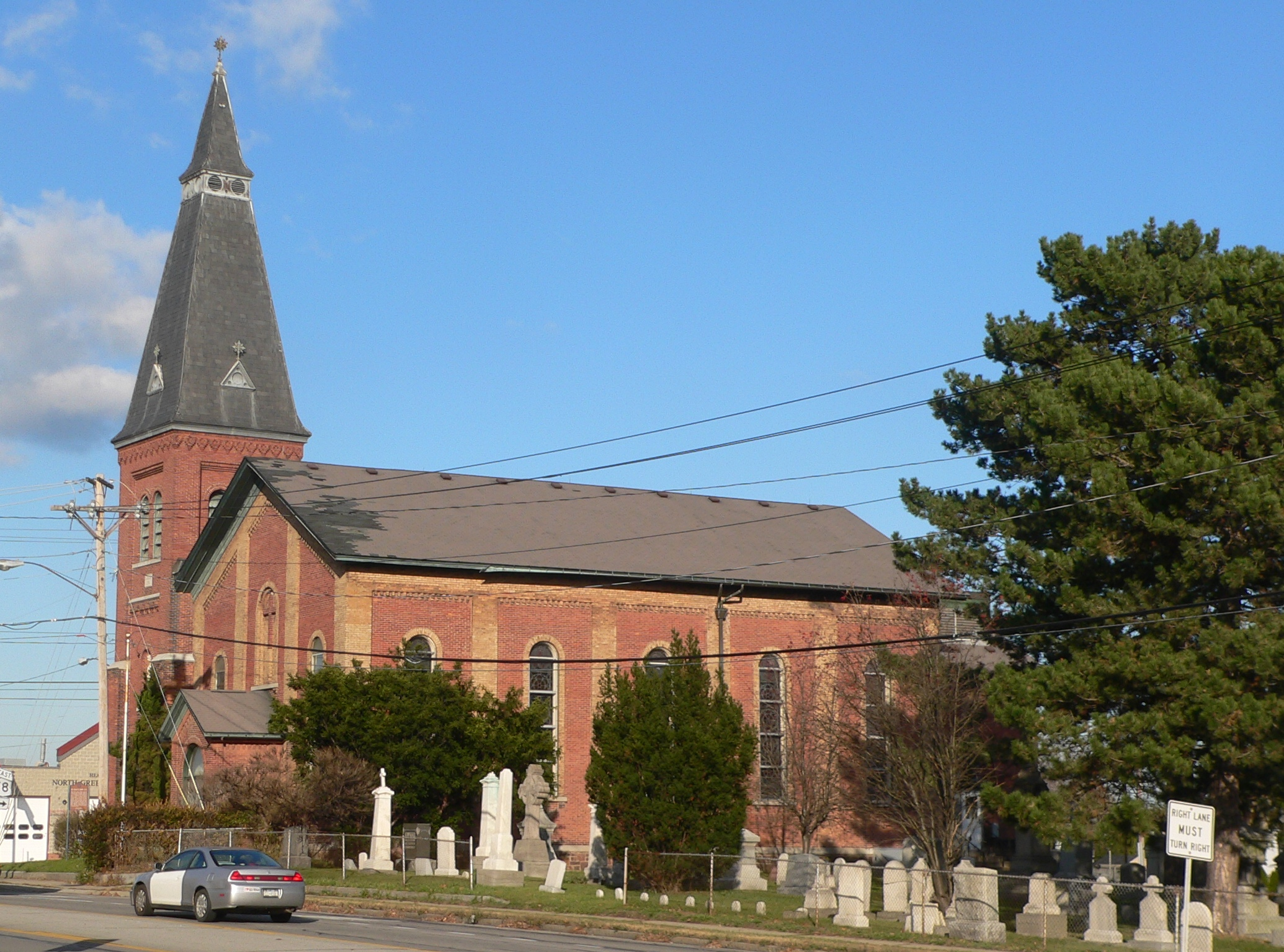

- Location within New York Location within the United States
- Location: 1785 Latta Rd., Greece, New York
- Coordinates: 43°15′10″N 77°39′33″W
- Area: less than one acre
- Built: 1859
- Architectural style: Romanesque
- NRHP reference No.: 89002001
- Added to NRHP: November 30, 1989

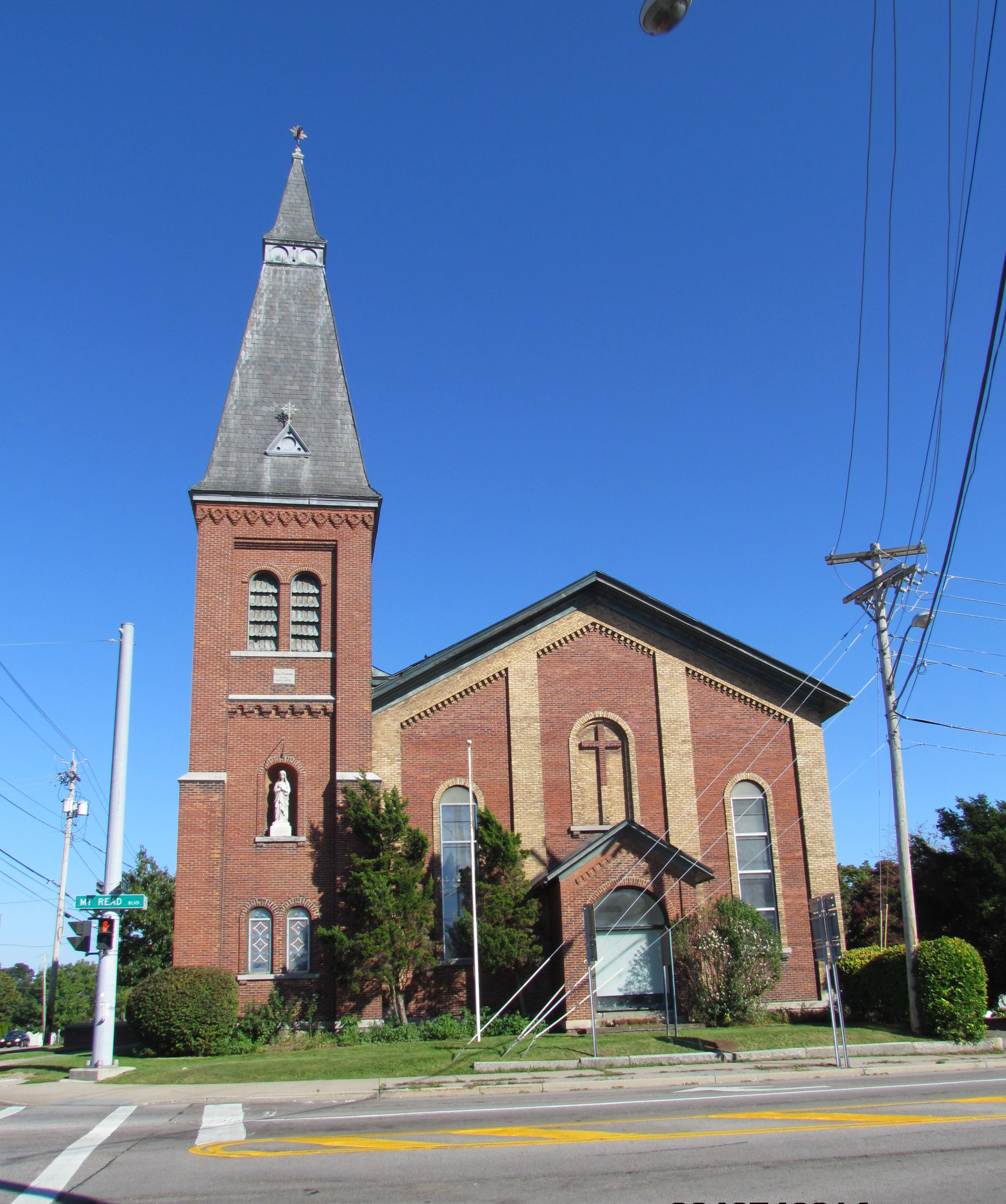
Front view of church

Our Mother of Sorrows Roman Catholic Church Complex is a historic former Roman Catholic church complex located at Greece in Monroe County, New York. The complex consists of the Romanesue Revival style brick church (ca.1858–1878) and the adjacent community cemetery (1823–ca.1900). The church was converted for use as a public library.

It was listed on the National Register of Historic Places in 1989.
