= Bill Reilich =

American politician

William D. Reilich
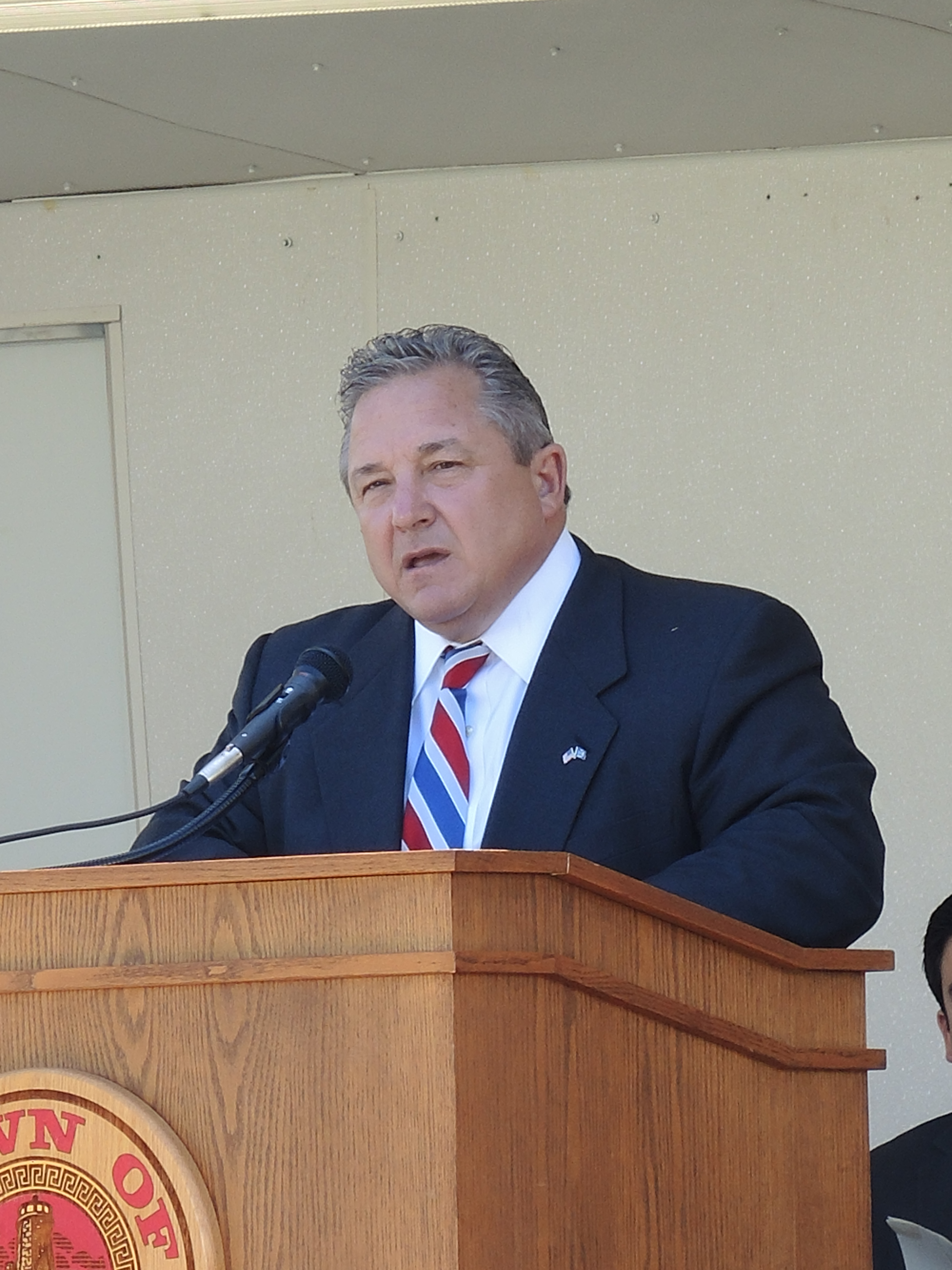

Town Supervisor of Greece
- In office January 1, 2014 – December 31, 2025
- Preceded by: John T. "Jack" Auberger
- Succeeded by: Jeffrey McCann

Member of the New York State Assembly from the 134th district
- In office January 1, 2003 – December 31, 2013
- Preceded by: Joseph E. Robach
- Succeeded by: Peter Lawrence

Member of the Monroe County Legislature from the 19th District
- In office January 1, 1998 – December 31, 2002
- Preceded by: John T. Auberger
- Succeeded by: Jeffrey L. McCann

Personal details
- Born: March 17, 1957 (age 69)
- Party: Republican
- Other political affiliations: Conservative
- Spouse: Amy
- Children: 5
- Occupation: Businessman, Politician
- Website: www.billreilich.com

William D. Reilich (born March 17, 1957) is an American politician best known for having served in the New York State Assembly. He served as Supervisor of the Town of Greece from 2013 to 2025.

== Early career ==
Reilich began his political career by serving on the Greece, New York zoning and environment boards, eventually becoming the GOP chair for the Town of Greece. In the early 1990s, he considered running for the Monroe County, New York legislature, but his campaign failed to materialize when redistricting required by the 1990 census left him without a seat for which to run. In 1997 he was picked by the Republican members of the county legislature, to succeed John T. Auberger who resigned to become Greece town supervisor.

He successfully defended his county legislative seat in 1999 and ran unopposed in 2001.

== New York State Assembly ==
Reilich was elected to the New York State Assembly in 2002 and served six terms.

In July 2008 he was elected to Chairman of the Monroe County GOP. He stepped down from the role in June 2019.

== Greece Town Supervisor ==
In November 2013, Reilich was elected to serve as the Supervisor for the Town of Greece. He was re-elected in 2017 and 2021 and retired from office in 2025.

In Town of Greece v. Galloway, the United States Supreme Court ruled in favor of the practice of opening town meetings with a prayer—a practice Reilich continued from his predecessor.

In 2019, the International Joint Commission (IJC) announced that it had appointed Reilich to the International Lake Ontario-St. Lawrence River Board.

Political offices
| Preceded by John T. "Jack" Auberger | Monroe County, New York Legislator, 19th District; January 1, 1998 – December 31, 2002 | Succeeded by Jeffrey L. McCann |
| Preceded by John T. "Jack" Auberger | Greece, New York Town Supervisor; January 1, 2014 – present | Incumbent |
New York State Assembly
| Preceded by Joseph E. Robach | New York State Assembly, 134th District; January 1, 2003 - December 31, 2013 | Succeeded by Peter Lawrence |
Party political offices
| Preceded by Stephen Minarik | Chairman of the Monroe County, New York Republican Committee; July 2, 2008 – present | Incumbent |
