= North Greece, New York =

Hamlet in Monroe County, New York, United States

- Hamlet
- Location within New York Location within the United States
- Coordinates: 43°15′13″N 77°43′57″W
- Country: United States
- State: New York
- County: Monroe
- Town: Greece
- Elevation: 335 ft (102 m)
- Time zone: UTC−05:00 (EST)
  - Summer (DST): UTC−04:00 (EDT)
- ZIP Code: 14515
- Area code: 585
- GNIS feature ID: 958794

North Greece is a hamlet in the town of Greece, Monroe County, New York, United States. The community is located along New York State Route 18, 9 miles (14 km) northwest of downtown Rochester.

Between 1909 and 2017, the hamlet was home to a hotel known variously as the American Foursquare style, North Greece Hotel, Moerlbach Hotel, Domino Inn, Cosmo Inn, Corner House Inn, and the DeMay Hotel. It was demolished in 2017, following a failed campaign by the Landmark Society of Western New York to preserve it.
