= Grand View Beach Railway =

Railway in Canada

Coordinates: 43°15′30″N 77°36′31″W

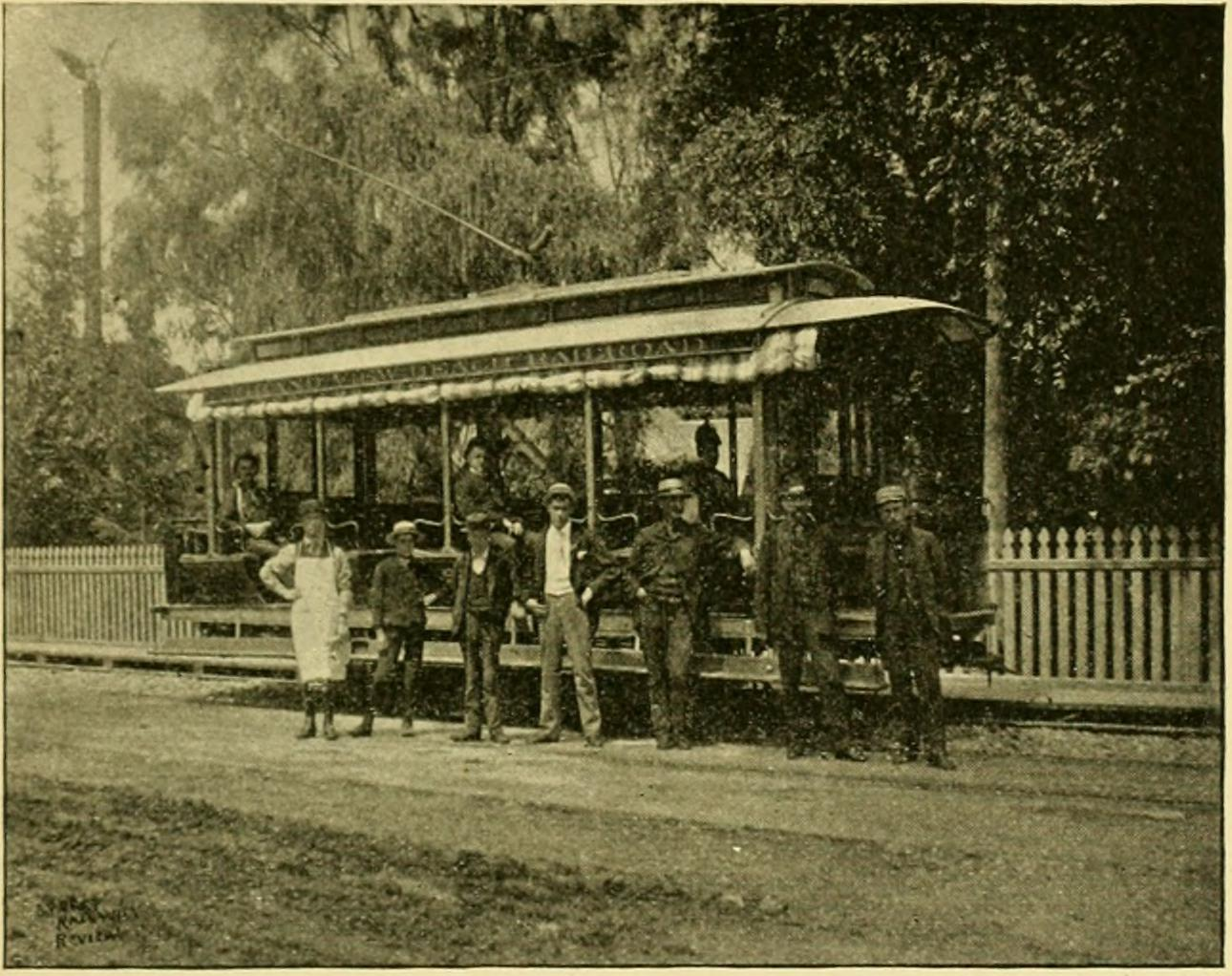
Terminus of Grand View Beach Railway

The Grand View Beach Railway was a scenic electric street railway along the shore of Lake Ontario from the village of Ontario Beach, a suburb of Rochester, to Manitou Beach.

== Route ==
The railroad was 8 miles (13 km) long. For several miles out of Ontario Beach the road ran along a bluff close to and overlooking the expanse of Ontario and about 15 feet (4.6 m) above the level of the water. From Rigney's Bluff westward to Manitou the track threaded a sandy beach between the great lake and various little bays and ponds.

=== Stops and sidings ===
0. Siding #1, Spitz Hotel, 160 Beach Ave.
1. Wilder Terr.
2. Hospital, Rear Summer Hospital for Children
3. Cloverdale Farm City line - Spur to water works - was siding #2
4. Little Pond
5. Rigney's Bluff (Shoremont)
6. Siding #3
7. Fehrenback's Lake View Hotel Adolph Grossmans Hotel at Round Pond Outlet Breakers
8. Island Cottage on left - Edgewater Hotel on Lakeshore (Louis Cook's)
9. Buck Pond
10. Crescent Beach-W.H. Lewis Prop. 1910 later Ray Gets Pass switch siding #4
11. Later passing switch, Lewis straight
12. Outlet - Long Pond, West end trestle
13. Long Pond, Grand View Beach Hotel - A. Kleinhans later Joe Rosenbach
14. Lowden Point Road
15. Siding Pass #5, Half Way
16.
17. Springwater Hotel
18.
19. Cranberry Pond
20. Siding #6
21. Braddocks Heights
22. E. Manitou
23. Elmheart Hotel
24. Passing track #7, Manitou Beach

=== Trestles and accommodation ===
- Ontario Beach Park, Charlotte, Rochester, New York
- Little Round Pond, Island Cottage
- Round Pond, Edgewater Hotel
- Buck Pond, Crescent Beach Hotel
- Long Pond, Grand View Beach
- Cranberry Pond, East Manitou Hotel
- Braddocks Bay, Elmheart Hotel
- Manitou, Odenbachs

== Infrastructure ==
The railroad was of modern construction and equipment. The track was 45-pound steel T rail. The rolling stock consisted of 7 motor cars, five open and two closed, and 7 open trail-cars, which could comfortably seat 60 to 70 persons. Rae motors of 40-horse-power were used and the old reliable McGuire truck.

The power plant was located 2 miles (3.2 km) from the eastern terminus of the railroad. It was equipped with two Thompson-Houston 8,000-Watt generators, two engines of Mclntosh-Seymour and three 100-horse-power boilers from the Pierce & Thomas shops.

The car-barn, located near the power house had storage capacity for 20 cars.

== Accidents ==
While erecting the last trestle over the Braddock's Bay, a sudden storm arose, and two men working in the middle of the bay on the trestle were drowned before they could be reached by help.

Some derailments and accidents occurred: Twelve people were injured and one of them died, when a crowded car derailed near Charlotte in 1902 and plunged into a gully 15 feet (4.6 m) below. In 1904, four passengers were killed and nine were injured in a collision on the line.

== History ==
The cars began running in June 1891, but the railroad was in an unfinished condition until about August 1. To October 1st the total earnings were $17,976.08, operating expenses $8,500.06, interest and taxes $4,010.34, surplus $4,465.14. The total number of passengers carried was 150,000.

The initial officers of the company were:

- H. H. Craig, president
- M. Doyle, vice-president
- J. Miller Kelly, secretary and treasurer
- E. A. Roworth, superintendent

The line was subsequently operated by the Rochester, Charlotte & Manitou Beach Railroad (1895-1908) and the Rochester & Manitou Railroad (1908-1925). The last car ran on the line in 1925.

== Photos ==
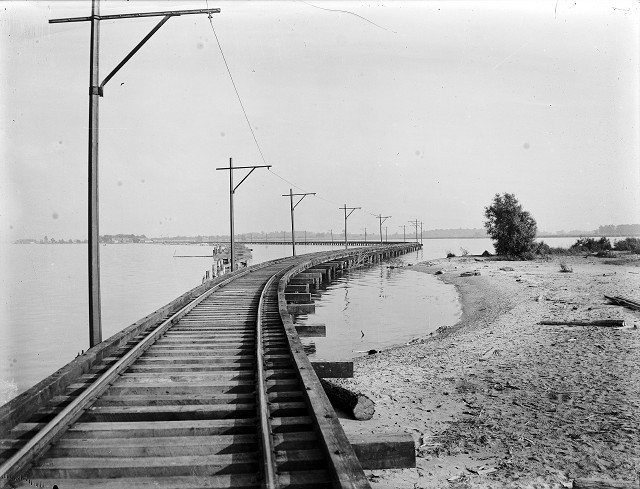
Trestle

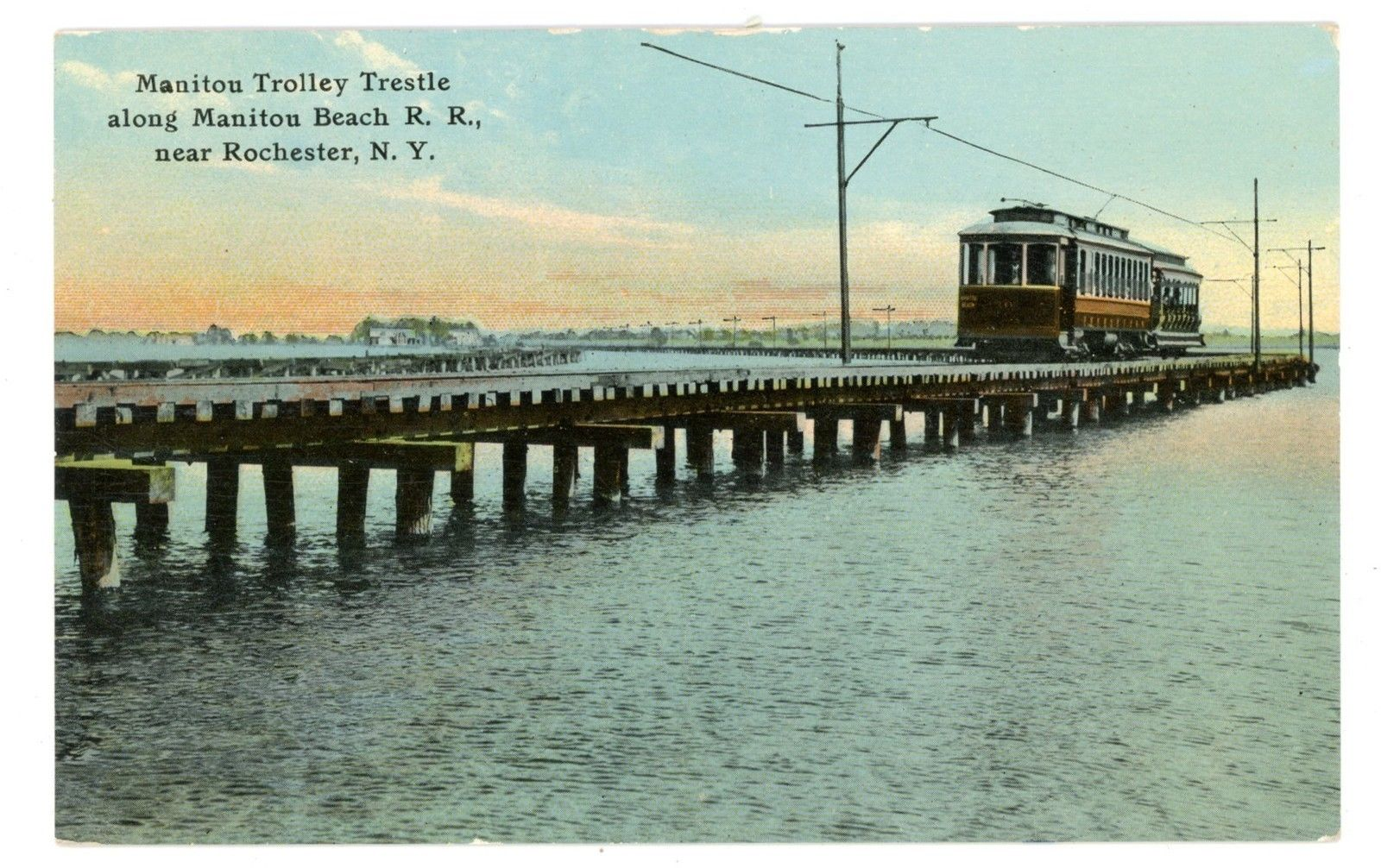
Trestle

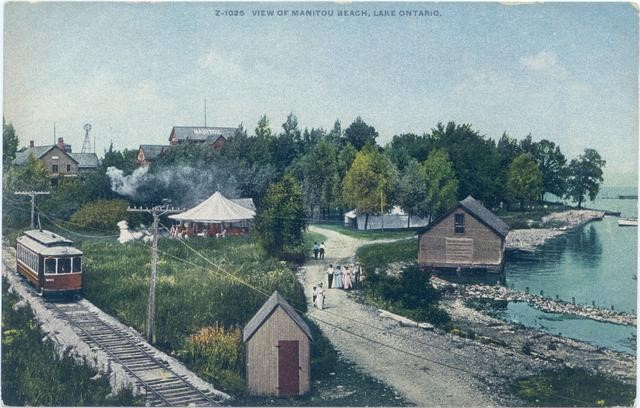
Manitou Beach

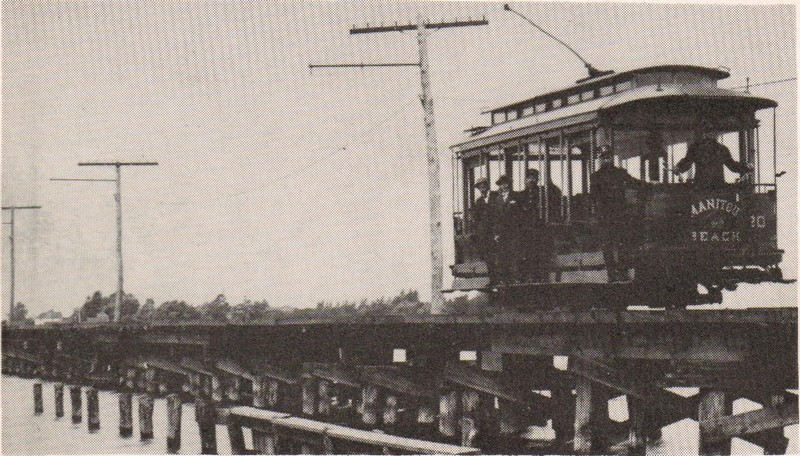
Braddock Bay Trestle

== Literature ==
- William Reed Gordon: Manitou Beach trolley days, 1891-1925. Rochester, N.Y., 1957.
