= Hilton, New York =

- Village
- Motto: "The little village with the big heart"
- Location in Monroe County and the state of New York

- Location of New York in the United States
- Coordinates: 43°17′24″N 77°47′33″W
- Country: United States
- State: New York
- County: Monroe
- Town: Parma
- Incorporated: 1885

Government
  - Mayor: Andrew Fowler (2026)

Area
  - Total: 1.79 sq mi (4.63 km^{2})
  - Land: 1.79 sq mi (4.63 km^{2})
  - Water: 0 sq mi (0.00 km^{2})
- Elevation: 285 ft (87 m)

Population (2020)
  - Total: 6,027
  - Density: 3,371.5/sq mi (1,301.73/km^{2})
- Time zone: UTC-5 (EST)
  - Summer (DST): UTC-4 (EDT)
- ZIP Code: 14468
- Area code: 585
- FIPS code: 36-34847
- Website: hiltonny.gov

Hilton is a village in Monroe County, New York, United States. The population was 6,027 at the 2020 census. The community was named for the Rev. Charles A. Hilton and is entirely within the town of Parma.

== History ==
In 1805, Jonathon Underwood came from Vermont and was the first to settle in the area. Originally known as "Unionville", the village was incorporated in 1885 as "North Parma". In 1896, the name was changed to Hilton to honor Reverend Charles Augustus Hilton, a former pastor of the village's Freewill Baptist Church. Over 60% of the central business district was destroyed by fire in March 1965 and later rebuilt.

The Chase Cobblestone Farmhouse and Curtis-Crumb Farm are listed on the National Register of Historic Places.

== Geography ==
Hilton is located in northwestern Monroe County at 43°17′24″N 77°47′33″W (43.289873, -77.792444). It is 16 miles (26 km) northwest of downtown Rochester. New York State Route 18 passes through the village, entering from the south and departing to the west. It leads southeast 5 miles (8 km) to North Greece and west 7 miles (11 km) to Hamlin. State Route 259 also passes through the center of Hilton, leading south 7 miles (11 km) to Spencerport and north 3 miles (5 km) to its terminus at the Lake Ontario State Parkway.

According to the U.S. Census Bureau, the village of Hilton has a total area of 1.8 square miles (4.7 km^{2}), all of it recorded as land. Salmon Creek, a direct tributary of Lake Ontario, flows eastward through the south side of the village.

== Demographics ==
Historical population
Census	Pop.	Note	%±
1880	376		—
1890	487		29.5%
1900	486		−0.2%
1910	627		29.0%
1920	827		31.9%
1930	923		11.6%
1940	895		−3.0%
1950	1,036		15.8%
1960	1,334		28.8%
1970	2,440		82.9%
1980	4,151		70.1%
1990	5,216		25.7%
2000	5,856		12.3%
2010	5,886		0.5%
2020	6,027		2.4%
U.S. Decennial Census

=== 2020 census ===
As of the 2020 census, Hilton had a population of 6,027. The median age was 41.2 years. 24.0% of residents were under the age of 18 and 19.1% of residents were 65 years of age or older. For every 100 females there were 90.0 males, and for every 100 females age 18 and over there were 85.7 males age 18 and over.

100.0% of residents lived in urban areas, while 0.0% lived in rural areas.

There were 2,434 households in Hilton, of which 32.1% had children under the age of 18 living in them. Of all households, 46.6% were married-couple households, 14.7% were households with a male householder and no spouse or partner present, and 30.4% were households with a female householder and no spouse or partner present. About 27.2% of all households were made up of individuals and 12.9% had someone living alone who was 65 years of age or older.

There were 2,489 housing units, of which 2.2% were vacant. The homeowner vacancy rate was 0.1% and the rental vacancy rate was 3.1%.

Racial composition as of the 2020 census
Race	Number	Percent
White	5,505	91.3%
Black or African American	187	3.1%
American Indian and Alaska Native	1	0.0%
Asian	26	0.4%
Native Hawaiian and Other Pacific Islander	0	0.0%
Some other race	64	1.1%
Two or more races	244	4.0%
Hispanic or Latino (of any race)	207	3.4%

=== 2000 census ===
As of the census of 2000, there were 5,856 people, 2,041 households, and 1,512 families residing in the village. The population density was 3,494.2 inhabitants per square mile (1,349.1/km^{2}). There were 2,128 housing units at an average density of 1,269.7 per square mile (490.2/km^{2}). The racial makeup of the village was 96.70% White, 1.66% African American, 0.14% Native American, 0.56% Asian, 0.19% from other races, and 0.75% from two or more races. Hispanic or Latino of any race were 1.49% of the population.

There were 2,041 households, out of which 44.7% had children under the age of 18 living with them, 57.7% were married couples living together, 11.6% had a female householder with no husband present, and 25.9% were non-families. 21.2% of all households were made up of individuals, and 7.6% had someone living alone who was 65 years of age or older. The average household size was 2.80 and the average family size was 3.29.

In the village, the population was spread out, with 31.3% under the age of 18, 7.2% from 18 to 24, 33.0% from 25 to 44, 18.6% from 45 to 64, and 10.0% who were 65 years of age or older. The median age was 34 years. For every 100 females, there were 92.3 males. For every 100 females age 18 and over, there were 86.9 males.

The median income for a household in the village was $51,336, and the median income for a family was $57,440. Males had a median income of $44,779 versus $27,192 for females. The per capita income for the village was $20,057. About 2.1% of families and 4.4% of the population were below the poverty line, including 3.1% of those under age 18 and 10.3% of those age 65 or over.

== Government ==
The Village of Hilton is governed by a Village Board consisting of a Mayor and four Village Board Trustees, all elected by registered voters. The Mayor serves as the executive of the town, and facilitates meetings of the Village Board. The Village Trustees serve as advisors and decision makers of the Villages affairs. The Village Board manages the general affairs of the Village and gives directives to Village department heads.

Current Village Board members:

- Andrew Fowler - Mayor
- Jamie Attoma - Deputy Mayor
- Christine Brower - Trustee
- Sherry Farrell - Trustee
- Shannon Zabelny - Trustee

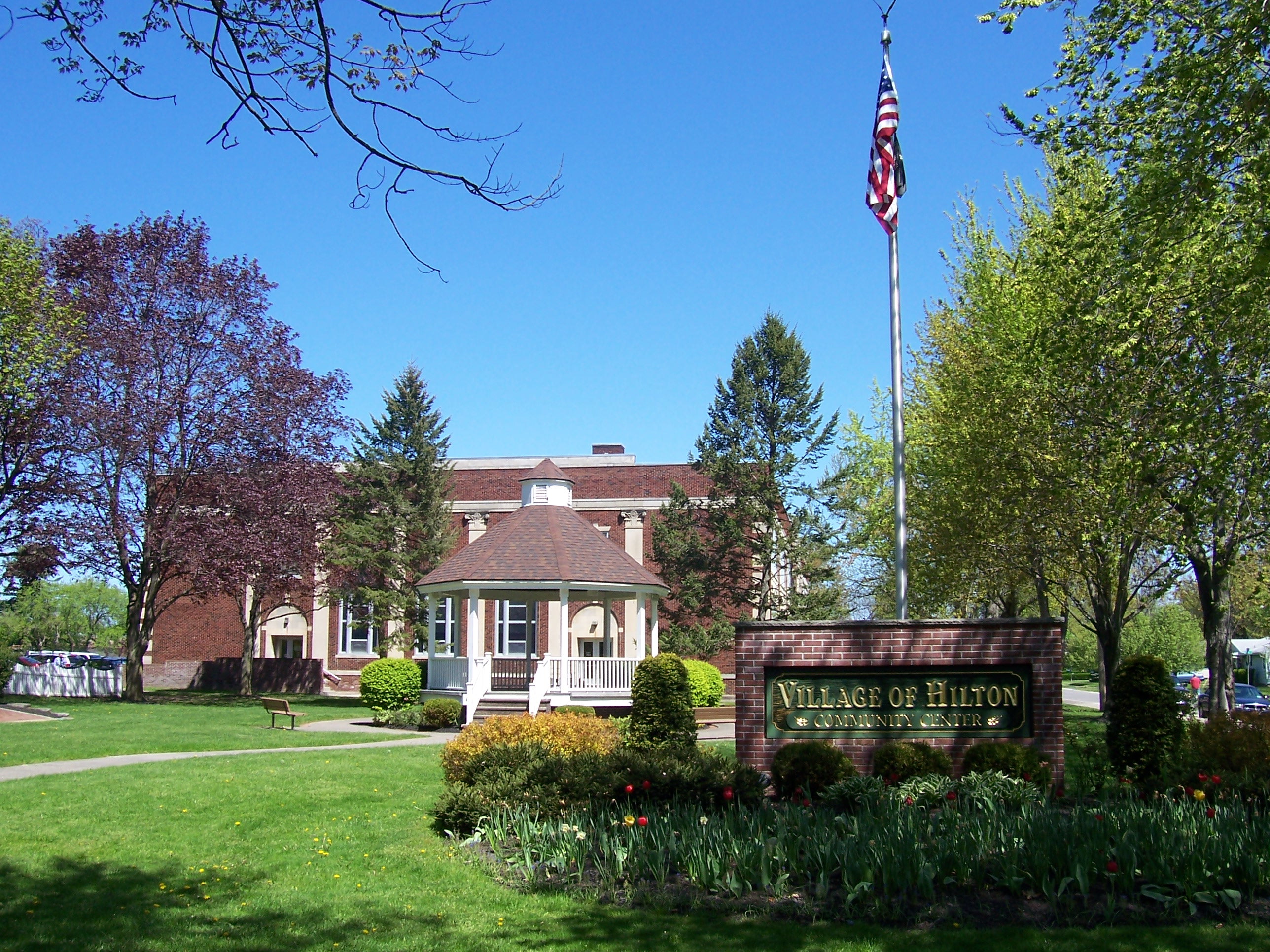
The Hilton community center, which houses the village offices

== Education ==
Hilton is served by the Hilton Central School District.

== Notable people ==
- Ryan Callahan, ice hockey player for the Tampa Bay Lightning and a silver medal Olympian; attended Hilton High School
- Cathy Turner, Olympic speed skater
