= David F. Gantt =

American politician (1941–2020)

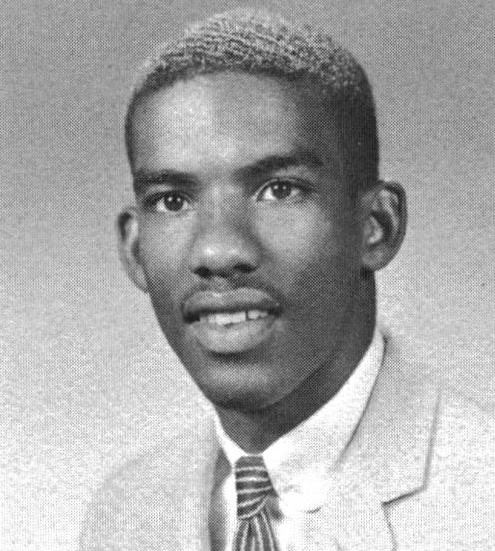
- Gantt in 1959

Member of the New York State Assembly from the 133rd district district
- In office January 1, 1983 – 2012
- Preceded by: Dale Rath
- Succeeded by: Bill Nojay

Member of the New York State Assembly from the 137th district district
- In office 2013 – July 1, 2020
- Preceded by: Christopher S. Friend
- Succeeded by: Demond Meeks

Member of the Monroe County Legislature from the 22nd district
- In office 1973 – December 21, 1982
- Preceded by: Ronald Good
- Succeeded by: Ron Thomas

Personal details
- Born: September 21, 1941 Opp, Alabama, U.S.
- Died: July 1, 2020 (aged 78)
- Party: Democratic
- Children: 2

David F. Gantt Jr. (September 12, 1941 – July 1, 2020) was an American politician who served as a member of the New York Assembly from 1983 to 2020 as a member of the Democratic Party. Prior to his Assembly tenure, he was a member of the Monroe County, New York Legislature. He was the first and, until the election of Demond Meeks in 2020, only black person to represent Monroe County in the New York Assembly.

Gantt was born in Alabama and his family moved to New York during the 1950s. He attended two colleges after graduating from high school, but dropped out of both after a few years. In 1973, he was elected to the Monroe County Legislature and served until his election to the Assembly in 1982. During his tenure in the Assembly, he served on the Aging, Commerce, Election Laws, Steering, Transportation, and Ways and Means committees.

== Early life ==
David F. Gantt Jr. was born on September 12, 1941, in Opp, Alabama, to Lena Mae Gantt and David Gantt Sr., who died during David's youth. During the 1950s his family moved to New York, as the social services system was better in New York than in the South. In 1960, he graduated from Franklin High School, and later he attended the Roberts Wesleyan College and Rochester Institute of Technology. Gantt attended Roberts Wesleyan College for two years using a partial basketball scholarship, but dropped out due to the financial constraints on his family.

After dropping out of college, he worked for Case-Hoyt Corp. printing company and as a manager at the Anthony Jordan Health Center. During the 1960 presidential election he volunteered for Massachusetts Senator John F. Kennedy's presidential campaign. In 1965, he campaigned for Ronald Good's successful campaign for the Monroe County Legislature.

== Career ==
=== Monroe County Legislature ===
==== Elections ====
In 1973, Gantt ran to succeed Good in the Monroe County Legislature from the 22nd district, defeating Republican nominee Leonard M. Lofton. He won reelection to the county legislature in 1975, 1977, and 1979.

In 1979, Gantt faced a primary challenge from Joseph Flores, a Hispanic Republican with the endorsement of the Hispanic Political Action Coalition and the Hispanic Women's Caucus, but defeated him in the Democratic primary. In the general election he defeated Flores, now the Republican nominee.

In 1981, Gantt faced a primary challenge from Marlene Tisdale. In the Democratic primary he defeated Tisdale, and was the only one of seven incumbent county legislators to receive the support of the Monroe County Democratic Party that won in the primary election. In the general election he defeated Republican nominee Willie C. Anderson.

==== Tenure ====
In 1977, the Democratic minority in the county legislature attempted to place him onto the Ways and Means Committee, but the Republican majority rejected Gantt in favor of Anthony Reed. After the Democratic Party gained a majority in the county legislature in the 1977 elections Gantt and Michael Ormsby were selected to serve as assistant majority leaders.

In 1980, Gantt was elected as a member of the New York Democratic Party's state committee alongside Marlene Tisdale.

=== New York Assembly ===
==== Elections ====
On July 15, 1982, Gantt announced that he would seek the Democratic nomination in the New York Assembly's 133rd district to replace Assemblymember Dale Rath. In the Democratic primary, he defeated Anthony Reed and James George. In the general election, Gantt defeated Republican nominee John H. Dixon, Conservative nominee Patricia Brennan, and Right to Life nominee James J. Downs. Gantt became the first and only black person to represent Monroe County in the Assembly. He was reelected in 1984, and 1986.

In 1988, Gantt faced a primary challenge from Melody Long, one of multiple Lyndon LaRouche supporters who challenged incumbent Democratic members of the Assembly and Senate in the primaries, but defeated Long in the primary. In the general election he defeated Republican nominee Michael Keller, Conservative nominee Mario Mazzullo, and Right to Life nominee Cheryl Battles.

Gantt won reelection from the 133rd district with opposition in 1990, 1992, 1996, 1998, 2000, 2002, and 2006. In 1994, 2004, 2008, and 2010, he won reelection from the 133rd district without opposition. He was redistricted into the 137th district and won reelection in 2012, 2014, 2016, and 2018.

In June 2020, Gantt announced that he would not seek reelection to the Assembly. He endorsed Ernest Flagler-Mitchell, a member of the Monroe County legislature, to succeed him, but Flagler-Mitchell was defeated by Demond Meeks.

==== Tenure ====
During the 1983–1985 session of the Assembly Gantt served on the Aging, Commerce, and Election Laws committees. During the 1993–1995 session of the Assembly he served on the Ways and Means, and Steering committees.

During the 1984 Democratic presidential primaries he supported Walter Mondale and ran as a Mondale delegate from the 29th congressional district. He was later selected to serve as a delegate-at-large for Mondale alongside Nancy Padilla. During the 1988 Democratic presidential primaries he supported Jesse Jackson and petitioned to serve as a Jackson delegate from the 29th congressional district.

In 1989, he was selected to serve as the chairman of the state Legislative Commission on the Development of Rural Resources by Speaker Mel Miller. In 1990, he was selected by Miller to replace Angelo Del Toro, who was appointed as Chairman of the Education committee, as co-chairman of the joint Legislative Task Force on Demographic Research and Reapportionment committee, which would reapportion districts based upon the 1990 census. In 1994, he was selected to replace Michael J. Bragman as chairman of the Transportation committee.

In January 1990, Gantt swore in Thomas P. Ryan Jr. for his second term as mayor of Rochester, New York. In 1991, he became the senior member of Monroe County's delegation following the death of Roger J. Robach.

During the 2004 Democratic presidential primaries he endorsed Massachusetts Senator John Kerry. Gantt stated that Kerry was "an American war hero and willing to stick his head out for education". During the 2008 Democratic presidential primaries he endorsed New York Senator Hillary Clinton and served as a delegate for her to the Democratic National Convention. During the 2012 presidential election he supported President Barack Obama, served as a delegate to the Democratic National Convention, and attended the Obama's second inauguration. During the 2016 Democratic presidential primaries he endorsed Hillary Clinton.

== Death ==
On July 1, 2020, Gantt died from kidney failure. Following his death, he was praised by Governor Andrew Cuomo, Attorney General Letitia James, United States Representative Joseph Morelle, Assembly Speaker Carl Heastie, Assembly Minority Leader William A. Barclay, and Rochester Mayor Lovely Warren.

== Political positions ==
=== Civil and human rights ===
In 1994, Gantt voted in favor of legislation that would prohibit discrimination based upon sexual orientation in jobs, schools, public establishments, and housing. The Assembly later voted unanimously to support legislation prohibit discrimination against people with disabilities. In 1997, he voted in favor of legislation that prohibited female genital mutilation. In 1999, he voted in favor a constitutional amendment that would require equal pay for men and women.

In 2001, Gantt co-sponsored a resolution by Charles H. Nesbitt that called for President George W. Bush to pardon the 50 black sailors who were convicted for refusing to load munitions onto ships following the Port Chicago disaster.

In 2007, Gantt voted in favor of legislation that made the sale of violent or indecent video games to minors a felony, and would require consoles to have equipment that would prevent the display of those games. He later voted in favor of legislation that would legalize the medicinal usage of marijuana.

In 2009, he chose to abstain on legislation that would legalize same-sex marriages in New York. In 2011, he voted against legislation that would legalize same-sex marriages.

=== Crime ===
In 1983, Gantt introduced legislation that would make the possession of a knife, dagger, or imitation pistol on school grounds a Class A misdemeanor punished with up to one year in prison and a $1,000 fine. He created the legislation in response to the stabbing death of Peter Castle, a school tutor. In 1993, he sponsored legislation that would make the possession of a loaded gun in a school building, playground, athletic field, or within 1,000 feet of schoolyards a felony punishable with six to twenty five years in prison. In 1995, he voted in favor of legislation that would ban the ownership of assault weapons. In 2000, he voted in favor of legislation that raised the age requirement for obtaining a handgun permit from 18 to 21 years old.

In 1990, he voted against legislation that would have reinstituted capital punishment in New York. In 1993, the Assembly voted 61 to 49, with Gantt voting against, in favor of an amendment to the Constitution of New York that would reinstitute capital punishment, but fell below the 2/3rds requirement. In 1995, he voted against legislation that would reinstitute capital punishment, but it was approved by the Assembly and Senate before being signed into law by Governor George Pataki.

In 1994, the Assembly voted 57 to 56, with Gantt voting against, against legislation that would create a central DNA registry of convicted sex offenders and would allow DNA evidence to be used in court. On June 28, 1995, the Assembly voted 149 to 9, with Gantt voting against, in favor of legislation similar to Megan's Law which would require sex offenders to register their location with the state.

=== Development ===
In 1993, Gantt proposed using $10 million to renovate the Silver Stadium to meet Major League Baseball facility standards and transfer ownership from the Rochester Red Wings to Monroe County. Following the demolition of the stadium he proposed building a new $44 million stadium, with $15 million coming from the state, $6 million from Monroe County, $1 million from Rochester, and the remainder coming from the Rochester Rhinos.

In 2004, the documentary July '64 was released and received two Emmy award nominations, after being produced in Rochester, New York, and receiving funding from the New York state legislature due to Gantt. The documentary was based on the 1964 Rochester race riot which Gantt had experienced.

=== Economics ===
In 1983, Gantt voted in favor of legislation that raised the minimum wage for farm workers from $2.75 to $3.35 per hour. In 1996, he voted in favor of legislation that would raise New York's minimum wage from $4.25 to $5.05 per hour. In 1997, he voted in favor of legislation that would raise New York's minimum wage from $4.25 to $5.15 per hour. In 2001 and 2002, he voted in favor of legislation that would raise the minimum wage from $5.15 to $6.75 per hour.

In 1992, he opposed a sales tax increase from 7% to 8% that was proposed by Monroe County Executive Robert L. King and approved by the Monroe County Legislature. However, Gantt later supported another proposed sales tax increase to 7.5%.

=== Ratings ===
In 1989, Gantt was given an 85% rating from the New York Environmental Planning Lobby. In 1990, he was given a 92% rating from the New York Civil Liberties Union. He was given a 20% rating from the Conservative Party of New York State in 1991. In 1992, he was given a 0% rating from the Conservative Party.

== Electoral history ==
=== Monroe County Legislature ===
David F. Gantt electoral history - Monroe County Legislature

1973 Monroe County Legislature 22nd district election
Party	Candidate	Votes	%
Democratic	David F. Gantt	1,502	70.25%
Republican	Leonard M. Lofton	636	29.75%
Total votes		2,138	100.00%
Blank/void		414	

1975 Monroe County Legislature 22nd district election
Party	Candidate	Votes	%
Democratic	David F. Gantt (incumbent)	1,466	72.97%
Republican	Rufina Luciano	543	27.03%
Total votes		2,009	100.00%
Blank/void		234	

1977 Monroe County Legislature 22nd district election
Party	Candidate	Votes	%
Democratic	David F. Gantt (incumbent)	1,097	72.75%
Republican	Rufina Luciano	411	27.25%
Total votes		1,508	100.00%
Blank/void		200	

1979 Monroe County Legislature 22nd district election
Primary election
Party	Candidate	Votes	%
Democratic	David F. Gantt (incumbent)	581	67.56%
Democratic	Joseph Flores	279	32.44%
Total votes		860	100.00%
General election
Democratic	David F. Gantt (incumbent)	1,177	76.13%
Republican	Joseph Flores	369	23.87%
Total votes		1,546	100.00%

1981 Monroe County Legislature 22nd district election
Primary election
Party	Candidate	Votes	%
Democratic	David F. Gantt (incumbent)	704	62.14%
Democratic	Marlene Tisdale	429	37.86%
Total votes		1,133	100.00%
General election
Democratic	David F. Gantt (incumbent)	1,616	78.79%
Republican	Willie C. Anderson	435	21.21%
Total votes		2,051	100.00%

=== New York State Assembly ===
David F. Gantt electoral history - New York State Assembly

1982 New York State Assembly 133rd district election
Party	Candidate	Votes	%
Democratic	David F. Gantt	15,936	62.18%
Liberal	David F. Gantt	559	2.18%
Total	David F. Gantt	16,495	64.36%
Republican	John Henry Dixon	7,101	27.71%
Conservative	Patricia H. Brennan	1,534	5.99%
Right to Life	James J. Downs	491	1.92%
Write-in		8	0.03%
Total votes		25,629	100.00%
Blank/void		4,236	

1984 New York State Assembly 133rd district election
Party	Candidate	Votes	%
Democratic	David F. Gantt (incumbent)		
Liberal	David F. Gantt (incumbent)		
Total	David F. Gantt (incumbent)	23,656	63.43%
Republican	Robert M. Dandrea		
Conservative	Robert M. Dandrea		
First Party Independent	Robert M. Dandrea		
Total	Robert M. Dandrea	13,640	36.57%
Total votes		37,296	100.00%

1986 New York State Assembly 133rd district election
Party	Candidate	Votes	%
Democratic	David F. Gantt (incumbent)	16,760	90.58%
Conservative	Mario C. Mazzullo	1,704	9.42%
Total votes		18,464	100.00%

1990 New York State Assembly 133rd district election
Party	Candidate	Votes	%
Democratic	David F. Gantt (incumbent)	13,222	63.97%
Republican	Patricia Millon	5,767	27.90%
Conservative	Mario C. Mazzullo	1,680	8.13%
Total votes		20,669	100.00%

1992 New York State Assembly 133rd district election
Party	Candidate	Votes	%
Democratic	David F. Gantt (incumbent)	15,024	79.68%
Conservative	Mario C. Mazzullo	2,538	13.46%
Right to Life	Deborah Sanders	1,293	6.86%
Total votes		18,855	100.00%

1996 New York State Assembly 133rd district election
Party	Candidate	Votes	%
Democratic	David F. Gantt (incumbent)	21,545	74.51%
Republican	AJ Sweeney	5,797	20.05%
Conservative	AJ Sweeney	1,023	3.54%
Total	AJ Sweeney	6,820	23.59%
Right to Life	Thomas P. Quinn	550	1.90%
Total votes		28,915	100.00%
Blank/void		4,942	

1998 New York State Assembly 133rd district election
Party	Candidate	Votes	%
Democratic	David F. Gantt (incumbent)	15,744	87.48%
Conservative	Judith A. Sinclair	2,254	12.52%
Total votes		17,998	100.00%
Blank/void		6,604	

2000 New York State Assembly 133rd district election
Party	Candidate	Votes	%
Democratic	David F. Gantt (incumbent)	20,274	72.06%
Republican	Stephen Tucciarello	6,480	23.03%
Conservative	Stephen Tucciarello	850	3.02%
Total	Stephen Tucciarello	7,330	26.05%
Independence	James A. Tranquill	530	1.88%
Total votes		28,134	100.00%
Blank/void		5,190	

2002 New York State Assembly 133rd district election
Party	Candidate	Votes	%
Democratic	David F. Gantt (incumbent)	14,872	81.74%
Conservative	Mark J. McCabe	1,690	9.29%
Independence	Solomon D. Harris	1,633	8.97%
Total votes		18,195	100.00%
Blank/void		7,270	

2004 New York State Assembly 133rd district election
Party	Candidate	Votes	%
Democratic	David F. Gantt (incumbent)	22,050	100.00%
Total votes		22,050	100.00%
Blank/void		17,040	

2006 New York State Assembly 133rd district election
Party	Candidate	Votes	%
Democratic	David F. Gantt (incumbent)	14,791	76.42%
Republican	Carlos Q. Coker	4,563	23.58%
Total votes		19,354	100.00%
Blank/void		4,249	

2008 New York State Assembly 133rd district election
Party	Candidate	Votes	%
Democratic	David F. Gantt (incumbent)	29,622	100.00%
Total votes		29,622	100.00%
Blank/void		14,981	

2010 New York State Assembly 133rd district election
Party	Candidate	Votes	%
Democratic	David F. Gantt (incumbent)	14,972	100.00%
Total votes		14,972	100.00%
Blank/void		7,554	

2012 New York State Assembly 137th district election
Party	Candidate	Votes	%
Democratic	David F. Gantt (incumbent)	33,081	88.03%
Green	Andrew P. Langdon	4,498	11.97%
Total votes		37,579	100.00%
Blank/void		8,674	

2014 New York State Assembly 137th district election
Party	Candidate	Votes	%
Democratic	David F. Gantt (incumbent)	13,288	78.58%
Rochester and Gates United Neighbors	Ann C. Lewis	3,622	21.42%
Total votes		16,910	100.00%
Blank/void		4,837	

2016 New York State Assembly 137th district election
Party	Candidate	Votes	%
Democratic	David F. Gantt (incumbent)	31,738	100.00%
Total votes		31,738	100.00%
Blank/void		12,775	

2018 New York State Assembly 137th district election
Primary election
Party	Candidate	Votes	%
Democratic	David F. Gantt (incumbent)	4,752	58.31%
Democratic	Ann C. Lewis	3,398	41.69%
Total votes		8,150	100.00%
General election
Democratic	David F. Gantt (incumbent)	22,825	100.00%
Total votes		22,825	100.00%
Blank/void		9,728	

New York State Assembly
Preceded by Dale Rath	Member from the 133rd State Assembly district 1983–2012	Succeeded by Bill Nojay
Preceded by Christopher S. Friend	Member from the 137th State Assembly district 2013–2020	Succeeded by Demond Meeks
