= Joseph A. Floreano Rochester Riverside Convention Center =

Convention center in Rochester, New York

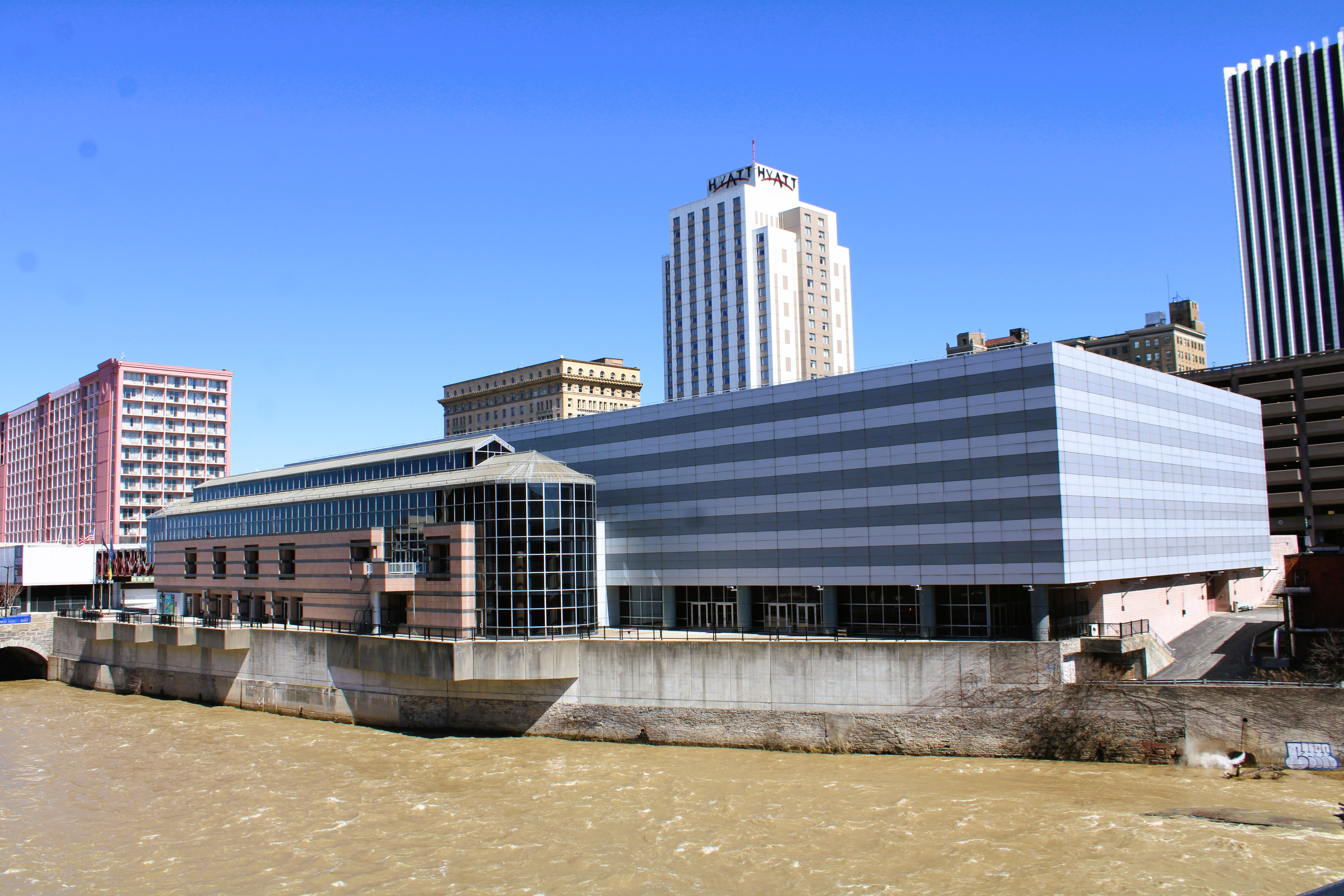
- The convention center in 2023

- Location within New York
- Former names: Rochester Riverside Convention Center
- Alternative names: RRCC

General information
- Status: Open
- Location: 123 East Main Street, Rochester, New York, United States
- Coordinates: 43.1558°N 77.6092°W
- Completed: 1985
- Opened: August 1985
- Cost: $40 million
- Owner: City of Rochester
- Operator: City of Rochester (501(c)(3) nonprofit)

Technical details
- Floor area: 100,000 sq ft (9,300 m^{2})

Design and construction
- Architect: James Stewart Polshek (Polshek Partnership)

Other information
- Seating capacity: 5,000 (theater); 3,500 (banquet)

Website
- www.rrcc.com

The Joseph A. Floreano Rochester Riverside Convention Center (commonly abbreviated RRCC) is a convention center located at 123 East Main Street in Rochester, New York, on the east bank of the Genesee River. Opened in August 1985, the center offers 100,000 square feet (9,300 m^{2}) of flexible event space, including a 49,275-square-foot (4,577.8 m^{2}) exhibit hall and a 10,208-square-foot (948.4 m^{2}) ballroom. Originally known as the Rochester Riverside Convention Center, the facility was renamed in 2014 in honor of its founding executive director, Joseph A. Floreano, who led the center for more than 30 years.

The convention center attracts more than 300,000 visitors annually and generates over $30 million in economic impact for the Rochester metropolitan area. It is connected via an enclosed skyway to the Hyatt Regency Rochester, a 341-room hotel.

== History ==
=== Construction ===
The Rochester Riverside Convention Center was designed by architect James Stewart Polshek of the Polshek Partnership (later Ennead Architects) and constructed at a cost of $40 million, funded by New York State. The facility opened in August 1985, situated on the east bank of the Genesee River in downtown Rochester.

=== Joseph A. Floreano ===
Joseph A. Floreano (1947–2014) was the founding executive director of the Rochester Riverside Convention Center. Born in Duluth, Minnesota, Floreano worked at the Duluth Arena before serving as general manager of the Rushmore Plaza Civic Center in Rapid City, South Dakota. He was hired in 1983, two years before the convention center opened, and served as its executive director for more than 30 years until his death on September 23, 2014.

Floreano was a prominent figure in the venue management industry. He served as past president and chairman of the board of the International Association of Venue Managers (IAVM) and received the organization's Charles A. McElravy Award in 2008, its highest honor recognizing distinguished career achievement. In June 2014, the City of Rochester presented him with a Key to the city. He received the IAVM Legacy Award posthumously in 2014.

=== Renaming ===
Following Floreano's death on September 23, 2014, the City of Rochester renamed the facility the Joseph A. Floreano Rochester Riverside Convention Center in his honor, recognizing his three decades of leadership and his role in establishing the convention center as a major economic driver for the Rochester region.

== Architecture and facilities ==
Designed by James Stewart Polshek, the convention center encompasses 100,000 square feet (9,300 m^{2}) of flexible event space. Its principal spaces include:

- Empire Exhibit Hall: 49,275 square feet (4,577.8 m^{2}) of column-free exhibit space with a capacity of 5,000
- Grand Lilac Ballroom: 10,208 square feet (948.4 m^{2}) with a capacity of 1,200
- Meeting rooms: 25 breakout rooms of varying sizes
- Theater-style seating: up to 5,000; banquet capacity: up to 3,500

The center is connected to the Hyatt Regency Rochester, a 341-room hotel, via an enclosed elevated skyway, allowing conventioneers to move between the two facilities without going outdoors.

The RRCC is one of few convention centers in the United States that operates its own food and beverage department. Members of its culinary staff hold membership in the Confrérie de la Chaîne des Rôtisseurs, an international gastronomic society. The center has received the Prime Site Award from Facilities magazine eleven times.

== Renovations ==
=== Phase 1: Main Street Addition ===
In January 2025, construction began on a $13 million Main Street Addition, the first significant renovation of the convention center since its opening in 1985. The project, expected to be completed in late 2026, includes a glass-fronted addition along Main Street, a large-format LED display, exterior facade repairs, and ADA accessibility improvements. The project received $5 million from New York State through the Urban Revitalization Initiative as part of the ROC the Riverway program.

=== Phase 2: Modernization ===
In 2025, $59.6 million in state funding was secured for a comprehensive modernization of the convention center, representing the largest state investment in the facility since its original construction in 1985. The funding was included in the New York State FY2026 budget.

The modernization, with design work beginning in 2026 and construction anticipated to start in 2029, will include upgrades to the HVAC systems, exhibit hall, ballroom, and meeting rooms.

A future South Terrace expansion, estimated at $27 million, has also been discussed as a potential third phase.

== Events ==
The convention center hosts a variety of trade shows, conferences, and community events throughout the year. Notable recurring events include the Rochester International Auto Show and the National Association for Music Education (NAfME) Eastern Division Conference.

== Operations ==
The convention center is owned by the City of Rochester and is operated as a 501(c)(3) nonprofit organization. As of 2025, the executive director is James D. Brown, and the board secretary is Joe Morelle Jr.

== Connection to state government ==
The convention center has received significant state investment since its original construction was funded by New York State in the 1980s. New York State Senator Jeremy Cooney, who represents the 56th Senate District encompassing Rochester, helped secure the $59.6 million Phase 2 modernization funding in the FY2026 state budget, which he described as "the largest state investment since the convention center was built 40 years ago." Cooney has called the convention center "an economic anchor of Downtown Rochester." He also supported the $13 million Phase 1 Main Street Addition through the ROC the Riverway initiative.

== See also ==
- Rochester, New York
- Genesee River
- James Stewart Polshek
- International Association of Venue Managers
- ROC the Riverway
