= Errigo =

Errigo is a surname. Notable people with the surname include:

- Arianna Errigo (born 1988), Italian fencer
- Joseph Errigo (1938–2020), American politician
