= Broad Street Bridge (Rochester, New York) =

- Erie Canal: Second Genesee Aqueduct
- U.S. National Register of Historic Places
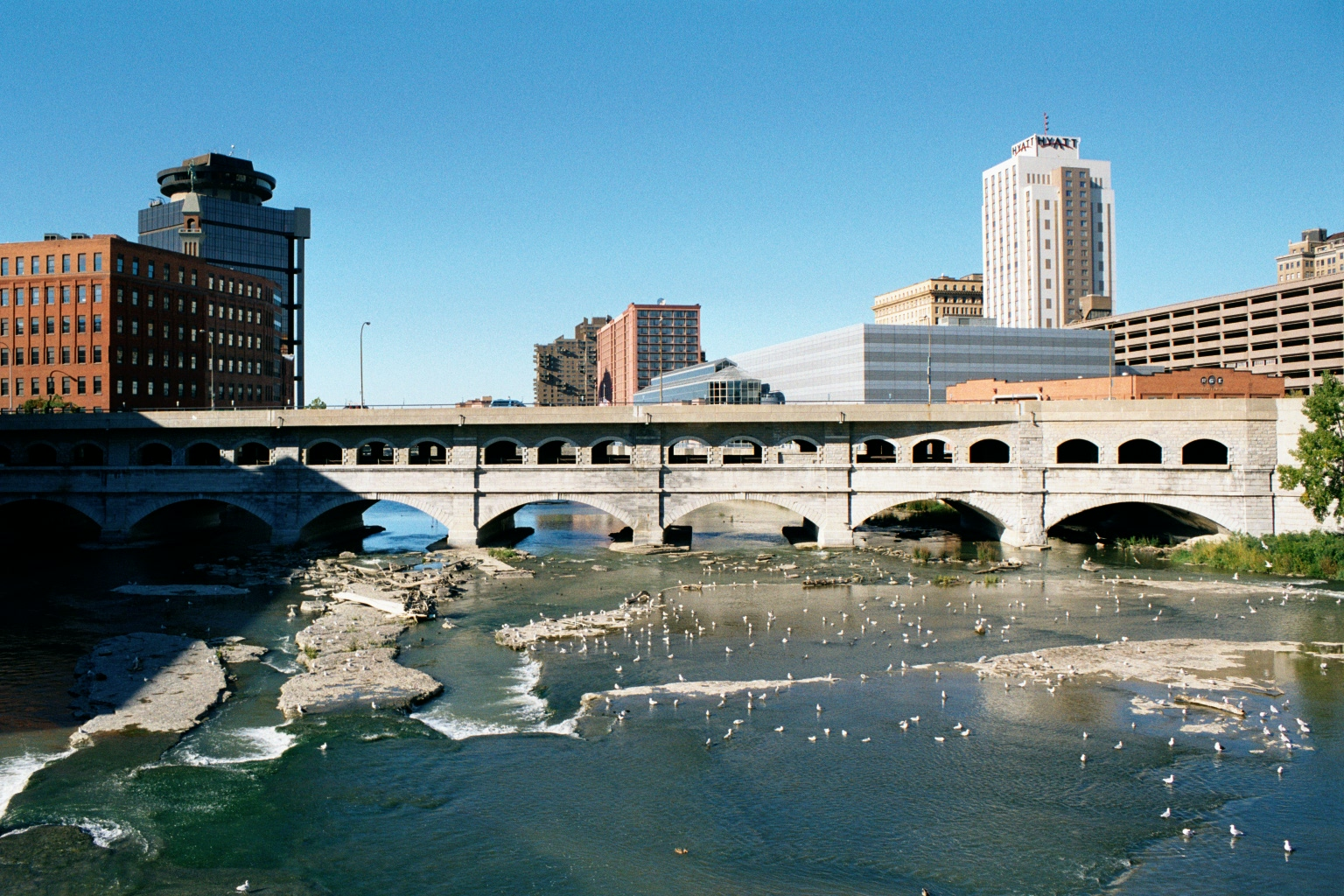
- Broad Street Bridge, 2001

- Location within New York Location within the United States
- Location: Broad St., Rochester, New York
- Coordinates: 43°9′17″N 77°36′35″W
- Area: less than 1 acre (4,000 m^{2})
- Built: 1836
- Architect: Roberts, Nathan
- NRHP reference No.: 76001228
- Added to NRHP: September 29, 1976

Erie Canal: Second Genesee Aqueduct, also known as the Broad Street Aqueduct or Broad Street Bridge, is a historic stone aqueduct located at Rochester in Monroe County, New York. It was constructed in 1836–1842 and originally carried the Erie Canal over the Genesee River. The overall length of the aqueduct including the wings and abutments is 800 feet (240 m). The aqueduct is 70 feet (21 m) wide and has large parapets on either side. It is one of four major aqueducts in the mid-19th century Erie Canal system. In 1927, a roadbed was added to carry automobile traffic and named Broad Street. It also carried a part of the Rochester Subway.

In 2018, a project called Aqueduct Reimagined was announced under the city's ROC the Riverway initiative, which proposes removing the automotive road deck to create a pedestrian space and creating walkway connections to nearby waterfront pathways. An early proposal involved partially re-flooding the former canal and subway bed on the aqueduct with water similar to the Canalside project in Buffalo, NY. The Re-watering concept was the recipient of numerous planning accolades, including the prestigious diamond award for outstanding community engagement and planning by the New York State Council of Consulting Engineers and the American Institute of Architects. In 2009, The Re-watering concept won the “Best New Idea for Downtown Development” by City Magazine.

The Re-watering concept included comprehensive economic analysis that projected a significant rate of return and community benefit. The Re-watering concept moved forward in 2010 with the completion of a draft environmental impact statement.

In 2010, The City of Rochester under newly elected Mayor Lovely Warren elected to set-aside the Re-watering concept as the City struggled to identify funding sources and expressed concern about maintaining water features throughout the City.

An alternate concept moved into community engagement and design phases in 2022.

The aqueduct was listed on the National Register of Historic Places in 1976.

== Gallery ==
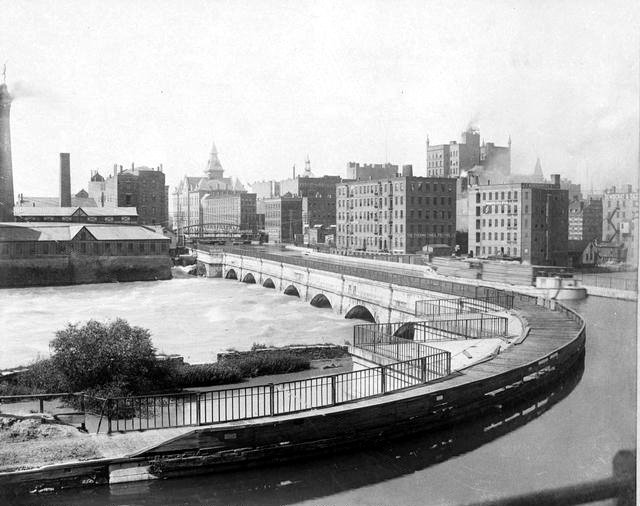
Rochester Erie Canal aqueduct circa 1890

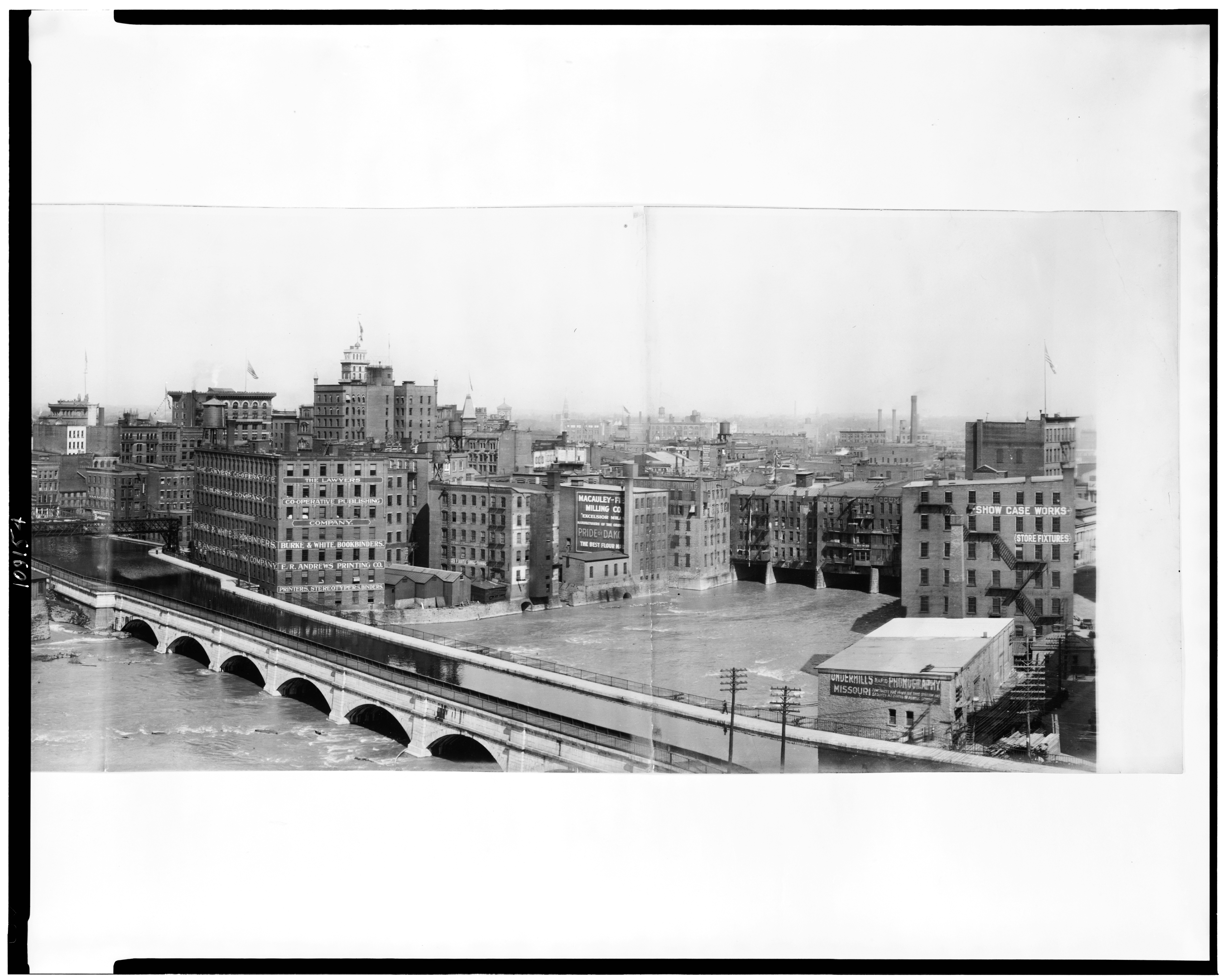
Aqueduct view from Rochester Business Institute

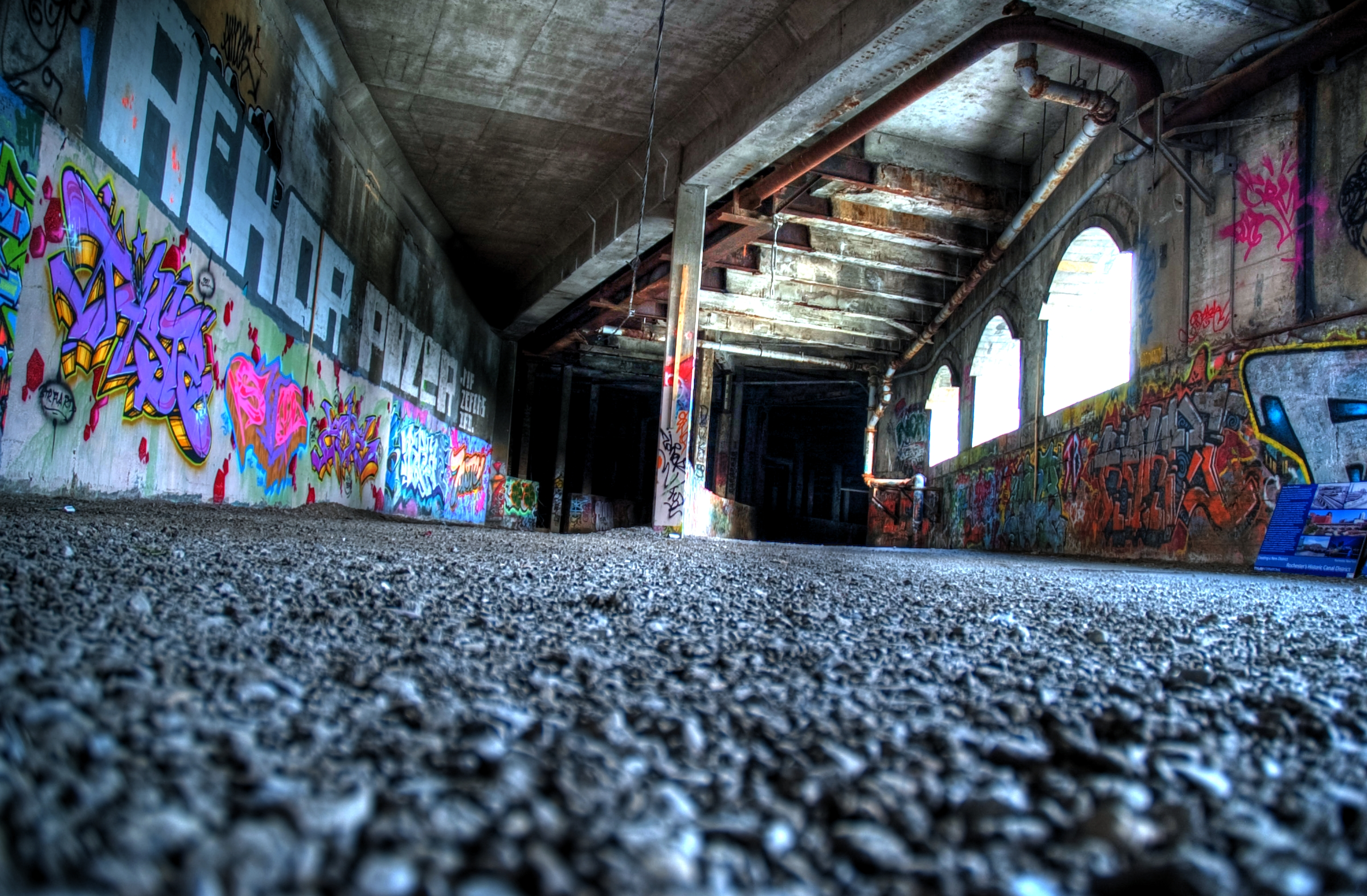
Broad Street Aqueduct in Rochester, New York

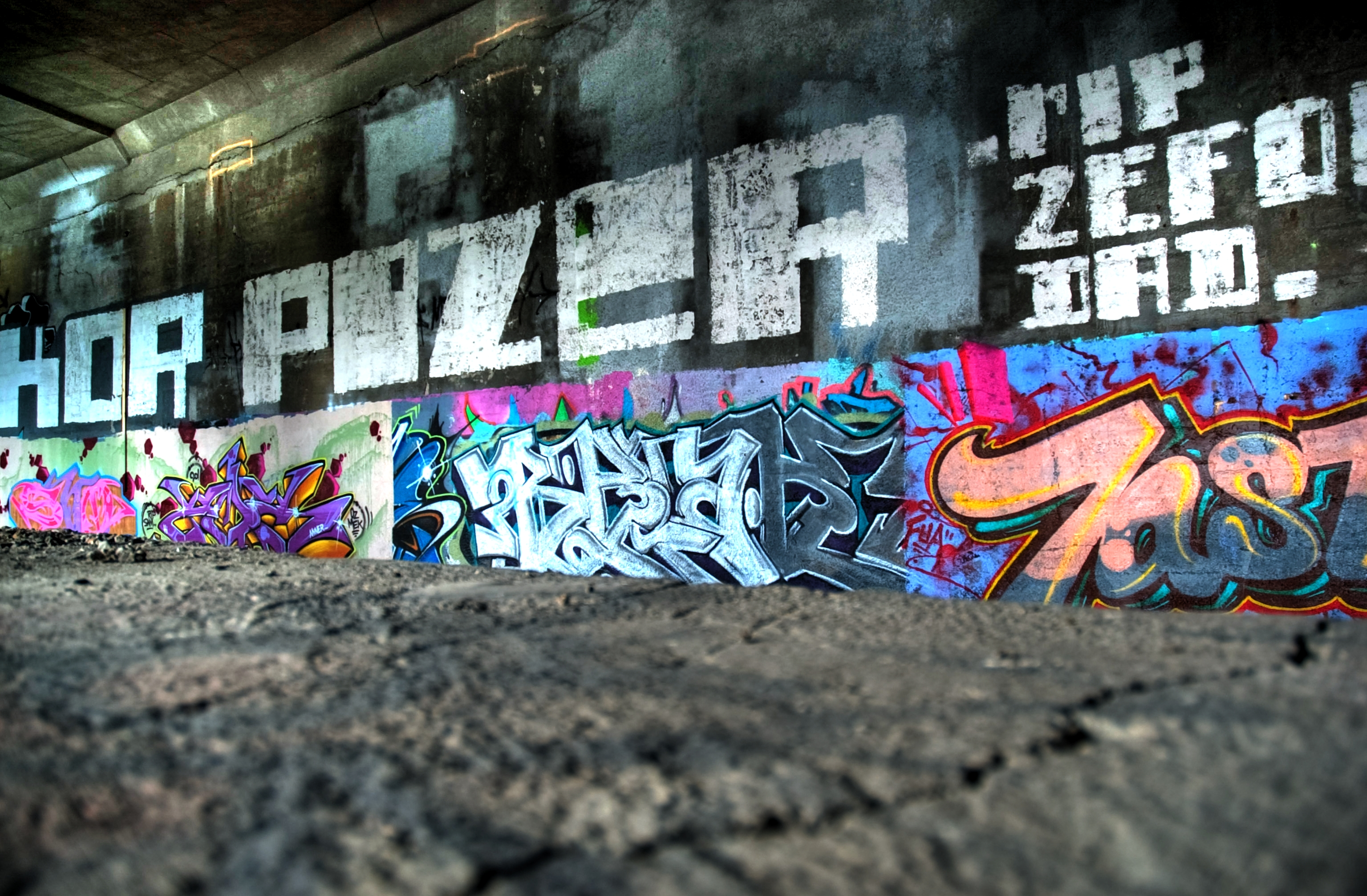
Graffiti at Broad Street Aqueduct in Rochester, NY

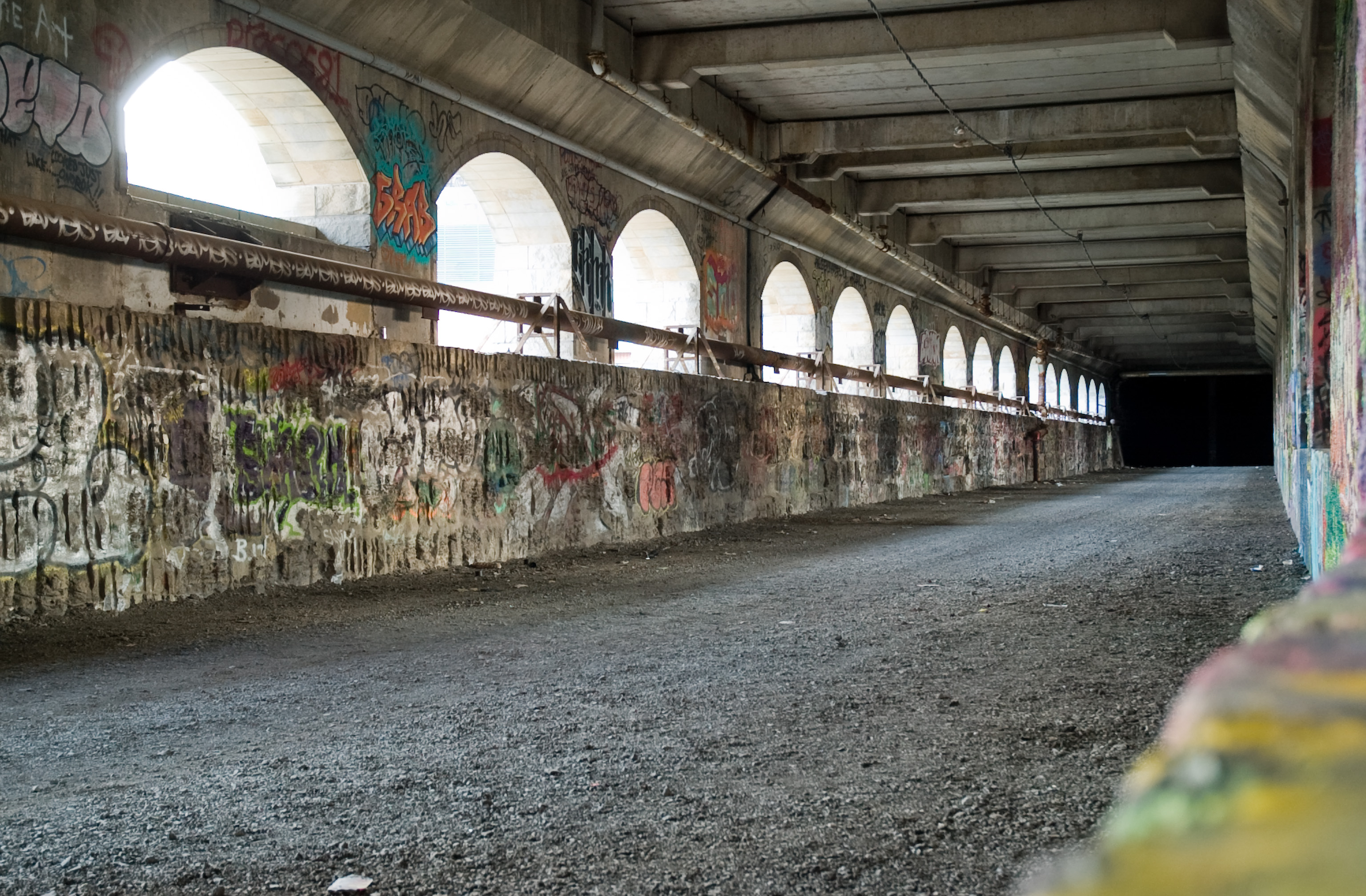
Sunset at Broad Street Aqueduct in Rochester, NY

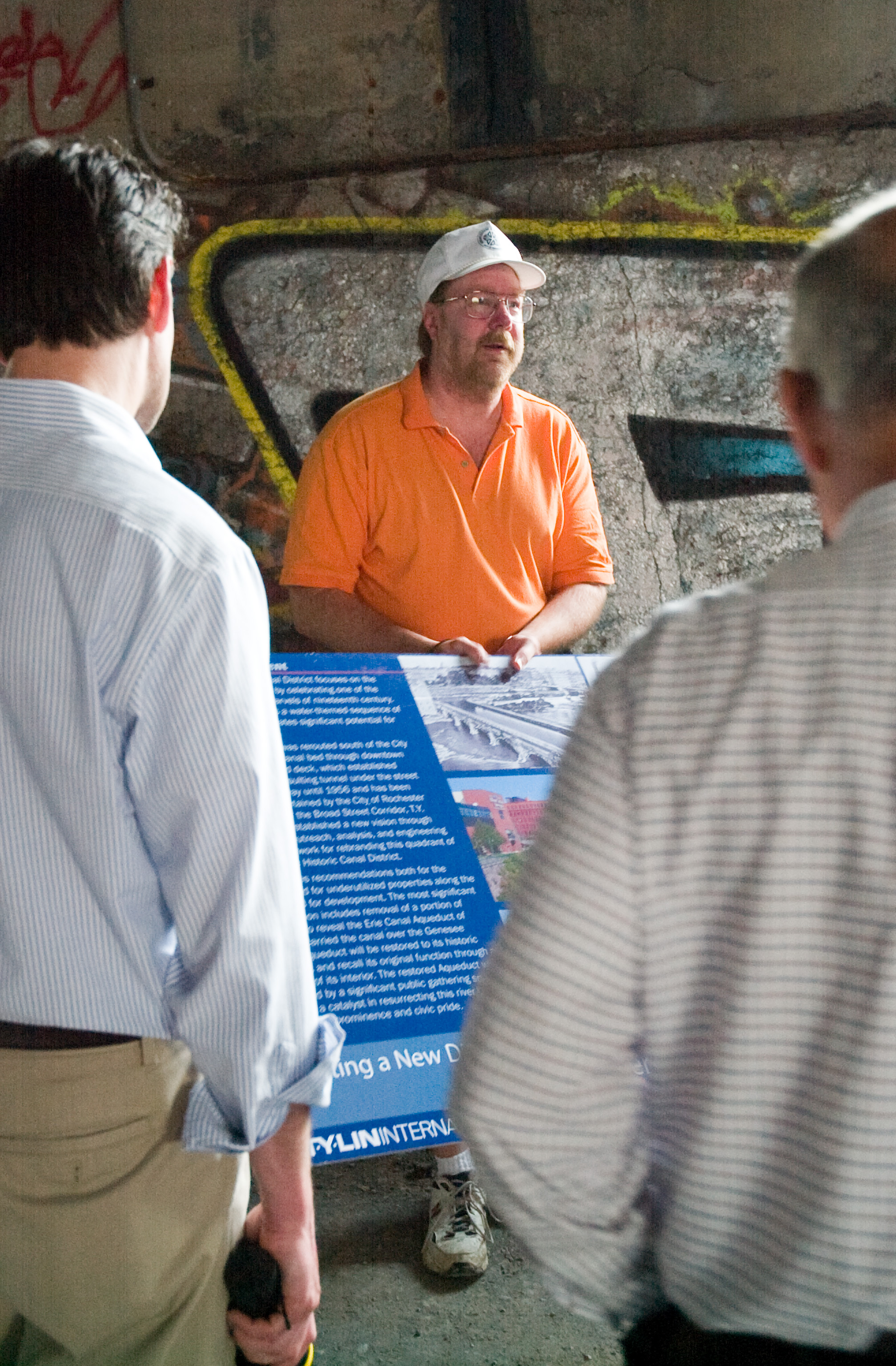
Aqueduct Tour in Rochester, NY
