= New York's 133rd State Assembly district =

American legislative district

Assemblymember
Andrea Bailey; R–Geneseo

New York's 133rd State Assembly district is one of the 150 districts in the New York State Assembly. It has been represented by Andrea Bailey since 2025, succeeding Marjorie Byrnes.

== Geography ==
=== 2020s ===
==== 2022 ====
District 133 contains portions of Monroe, Ontario, Steuben and Wyoming counties and all of Livingston County.

=== 2010s ===
District 133 contains portions of Monroe and Steuben counties and all of Livingston County.

== Recent election results ==
=== 2026 ===
2026 New York State Assembly election, District 133
Party	Candidate	Votes	%
Republican	Andrea Bailey		
Conservative	Andrea Bailey		
Total	Andrea Bailey (incumbent)		
Democratic	Gladys Flores		
Write-in			
Total votes			

=== 2024 ===
2024 New York State Assembly election, District 133
Party	Candidate	Votes	%
Republican	Andrea Bailey	39,390	
Conservative	Andrea Bailey	5,601	
Total	Andrea Bailey	44,991	65.0
Democratic	Colleen Walsh-Williams	24,195	35.0
Write-in		27	0.0
Total votes		69,213	100.0
Republican hold			

=== 2022 ===
2022 New York State Assembly election, District 133
Party	Candidate	Votes	%
Republican	Marjorie Byrnes	31,190	
Conservative	Marjorie Byrnes	5,399	
Total	Marjorie Byrnes (incumbent)	36,589	67.5
Democratic	Sara Spezzano	17,618	32.5
Write-in		8	0.0
Total votes		54,215	100.0
Republican hold			

=== 2020 ===
2020 New York State Assembly election, District 133
Party	Candidate	Votes	%
Republican	Marjorie Byrnes	35,676	
Conservative	Marjorie Byrnes	4,902	
Independence	Marjorie Byrnes	1,182	
Total	Marjorie Byrnes (incumbent)	41,760	61.8
Democratic	Charon Sattler-LeBlanc	24,013	
Working Families	Charon Sattler-LeBlanc	1,817	
Total	Charon Sattler-LeBlanc	25,830	38.2
Write-in		7	0.2
Total votes		67,597	100.0
Republican hold			

=== 2018 ===
2018 New York State Assembly election, District 133
Primary election
Party	Candidate	Votes	%
Republican	Marjorie Byrnes	3,709	61.9
Republican	Joseph Errigo (incumbent)	2,282	38.1
Write-in		0	0.0
Total votes		5,991	100
General election
Republican	Marjorie Byrnes	25,596	
Conservative	Marjorie Byrnes	4,091	
Total	Marjorie Byrnes	29,687	54.5
Democratic	Barbara Baer	22,048	
Working Families	Barbara Baer	817	
Women's Equality	Barbara Baer	475	
Total	Barbara Baer	23,340	42.8
Independence	Joseph Errigo	1,165	
Reform	Joseph Errigo	278	
Total	Joseph Errigo (incumbent)	1,443	2.6
Write-in		21	0.1
Total votes		54,491	100.0
Republican hold			

=== 2016 ===
Then-incumbent Bill Nojay died by suicide one week before the Republican primary, which he posthumously won. The Republican chairmen for the district's overlying counties selected Joseph Errigo to replace him on the general election ballot.

2016 New York State Assembly election, District 133
Primary election
Party	Candidate	Votes	%
Republican	Bill Nojay † (incumbent)	2,848	61.0
Republican	Richard Milne	1,820	39.0
Write-in		0	0.0
Total votes		4,668	100
General election
Republican	Joseph Errigo	28,514	
Conservative	Joseph Errigo	4,401	
Independence	Joseph Errigo	1,306	
Reform	Joseph Errigo	199	
Total	Joseph Errigo	34,420	56.3
Democratic	Barbara Baer	24,194	
Working Families	Barbara Baer	1,506	
Women's Equality	Barbara Baer	653	
Total	Barbara Baer	26,353	43.1
Write-in		342	0.6
Total votes		61,115	100.0
Republican hold			

=== 2014 ===
2014 New York State Assembly election, District 133
Party	Candidate	Votes	%
Republican	Bill Nojay	26,259	
Conservative	Bill Nojay	5,543	
Total	Bill Nojay (incumbent)	31,802	99.3
Write-in		223	0.7
Total votes		32,025	100.0
Republican hold			

=== 2012 ===
2012 New York State Assembly election, District 133
Primary election
Party	Candidate	Votes	%
Republican	Bill Nojay	3,555	57.2
Republican	Richard Burke	2,657	42.8
Write-in		0	0.0
Total votes		6,212	100
General election
Republican	Bill Nojay	26,883	
Independence	Bill Nojay	1,673	
Total	Bill Nojay	28,556	51.3
Democratic	Randolph Weaver	21,165	38.0
Conservative	Richard Burke	5,910	10.6
Write-in		23	0.1
Total votes		55,654	100.0
Republican hold			
