= Joseph Robach =

American politician

Joseph E. Robach
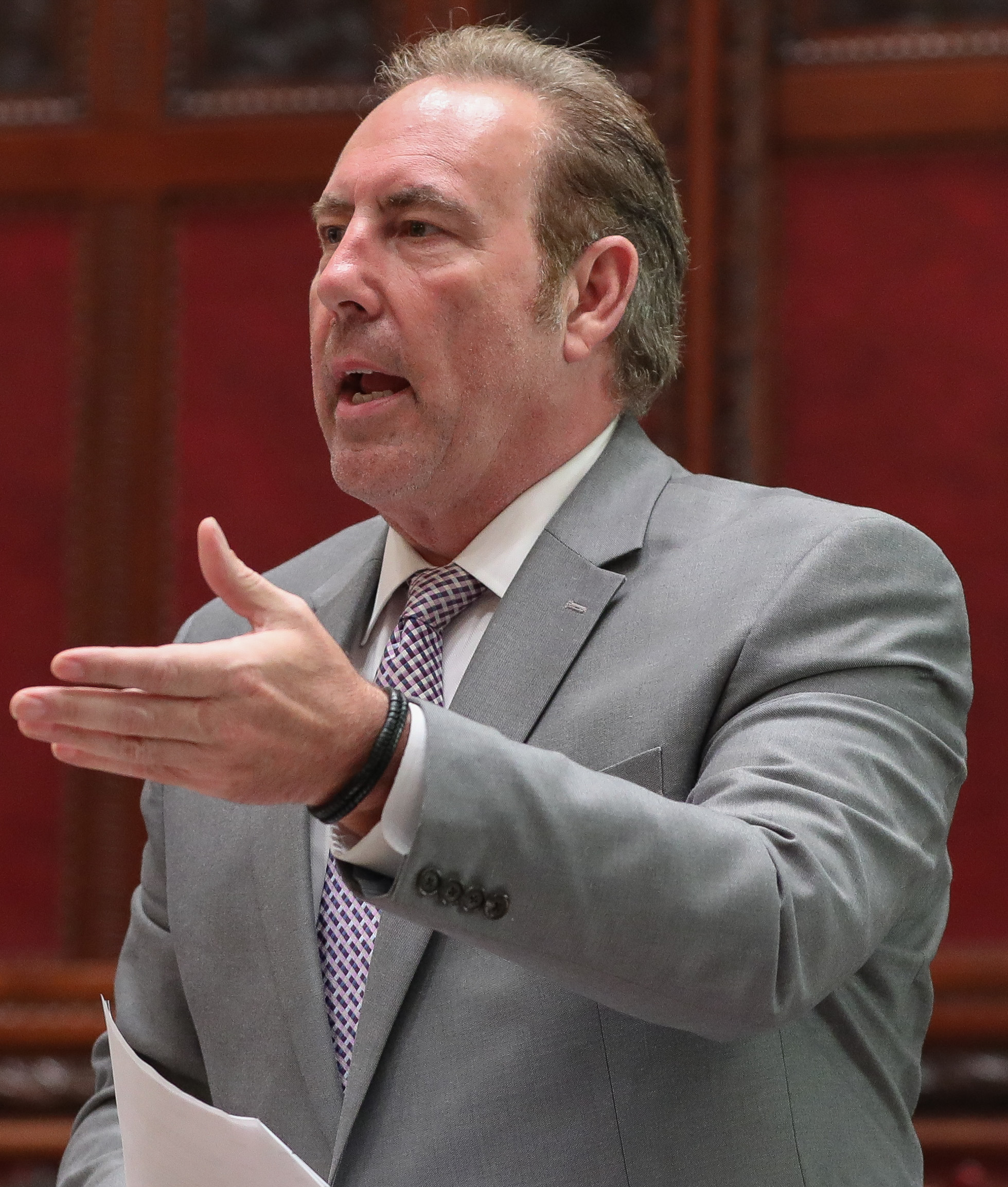

Member of the New York State Senate from the 56th district
- In office January 1, 2003 – December 31, 2020
- Preceded by: Richard A. Dollinger
- Succeeded by: Jeremy Cooney

Member of the New York State Assembly from the 134th district
- In office November 5, 1991 – December 31, 2002
- Preceded by: Roger J. Robach
- Succeeded by: Bill Reilich

Personal details
- Born: February 22, 1958 (age 68) Rochester, New York, U.S.
- Party: Republican (2002-present)
- Other political affiliations: Democratic (1991-2002)
- Children: 3
- Parent(s): Roger J. Robach, Terri Fallocco
- Education: Aquinas Institute
- Alma mater: State University of New York College at Brockport (BS, MPA)
- Website: Former Senate website

Joseph E. Robach (born February 22, 1958) is an American politician who was a member of the New York Senate, representing the 56th district from 2003 until 2020. The district includes portions of Rochester, New York and the surrounding communities.

A Republican, Robach formerly served in the New York State Assembly as a Democrat from 1991 to 2002.

== Background ==
Robach was born on February 22, 1958, the son of Assemblyman Roger J. Robach (1934–1991) and Teresa Fallocco. He graduated from Aquinas Institute and the State University of New York College at Brockport, where he received his Bachelor of Science and Master of Public Administration degrees.

In 1991, Robach entered politics as a Democrat, and was elected to the New York State Assembly in a special election in November of that year to the seat vacated by the death of his father. As an Assemblyman, Robach often had the support of the Conservative Party of New York State. He would serve in the Assembly until 2002.

In 2018, Robach weighed running for the United States House of Representatives to succeed Louise Slaughter, who had died. He ultimately decided not to run.

== New York Senate ==
In 2002, Robach switched parties to become a Republican. In lieu of running for another term in the Assembly, he opted to run for the New York State Senate, where he defeated Harry Bronson 66% to 33%. Since his initial election, Robach has never faced serious opposition, with an exception in 2008, when he narrowly defeated Richard A. Dollinger 52% to 48%.

Despite the district being overwhelmingly Democratic by voter registration, Robach was unopposed in 2012 and 2014. He won reelection by double digits in 2016 and 2018.

On December 11, 2019, Robach announced that he would not run for reelection in 2020.

== Post-political career ==
Currently, Robach hosts a weekly radio show on WYSL.

New York State Assembly
Preceded by Roger J. Robach	New York State Assembly; 134th District; 1991–2002	Succeeded by Bill Reilich
New York State Senate
Preceded by Patricia McGee	New York State Senate; 56th District; 2003–2020	Succeeded by Jeremy Cooney
