= Jeremy Cooney =

American politician (born 1981)

Jeremy A. Cooney
- Cooney in 2026

Member of the New York State Senate from the 56th district
- Incumbent
- Assumed office January 1, 2021
- Preceded by: Joseph Robach

Personal details
- Born: August 1, 1981 (age 45) Calcutta, India (now Kolkata)
- Party: Democratic
- Education: Hobart and William Smith Colleges (BA); Albany Law School (JD)
- Website: Campaign website State Senate website

Jeremy A. Cooney (born August 1, 1981) is an American politician from the state of New York. A Democrat, Cooney represents the 56th district of the New York State Senate, covering the majority of the City of Rochester and the Towns of Brighton, Gates, Greece, and Henrietta in Monroe County. His term of office began on January 1, 2021.

Jeremy Cooney speaking
Audio excerpt of New York State Senator Jeremy Cooney at a public event in Rochester, New York, February 2026

== Early life and education ==
Cooney was adopted from an orphanage in Kolkata, India, by a single mother in upstate New York who was a professor at Monroe Community College. He was raised in Rochester and attended schools in the Rochester City School District, graduating from School of the Arts. Cooney earned his B.A. with honors in public policy, with minors in economics and philosophy, from Hobart and William Smith Colleges, where he served as president of the Hobart Student Government, and his J.D. cum laude from Albany Law School, where he served as one of the executive editors of the Albany Law Review.

== Political career ==
Prior to running for elected office, Cooney served as an aide to U.S. Congresswoman Louise Slaughter, a law clerk to New York Governor David Paterson, worked for Empire State Development under Andrew Cuomo, and was the first chief of staff to Mayor Lovely A. Warren of the City of Rochester.

=== New York State Senate ===
==== Elections ====
Cooney ran for the 56th Senate District in 2018 and lost to 20-year incumbent Joseph Robach.

He ran again in 2020, and during the COVID-19 pandemic, closed his campaign office while keeping staff on payroll to deliver meals to seniors and launch a county-wide book donation program that collected 60,000 books for local families who lacked access to libraries during the shutdown. He won a 3-way primary election before winning the 2020 general election by a margin of 12.6%. He is the first Asian to be elected to state office from upstate New York.

In November 2022, he defeated Republican Jim VanBrederode and was re-elected to a second term.

Senator Cooney was re-elected to a third term after defeating Jim VanBrederode once again in 2024.

==== Transportation ====
Cooney serves as Chairman of the Senate Committee on Transportation, the first member of the AAPI community to hold the position in the history of New York State. He also serves as Chairman of the Senate Subcommittee on Cannabis and is a member of the committees on Civil Service and Pensions, Codes, Cultural Affairs, Tourism, Parks And Recreation, Ethics And Internal Governance, Finance, Insurance, Judiciary, and the Select Majority Task Force on Minority and Women-Owned Business Enterprises.

As Chairman of the Senate Committee on Transportation, Cooney secured $18 million in the FY2025 state budget for the construction of a long-distance bus terminal at the Louise M. Slaughter Station in Rochester, intended to complete the intermodal transit hub originally envisioned when the Amtrak station opened in 2017. Cooney has advocated for higher-speed rail in New York State, proposing a corridor connecting New York City to Toronto at speeds up to 125 miles per hour (201 km/h) through Albany, Rochester, and Buffalo. In a November 2024 Newsweek feature, he described the proposal as a potential "modern-day Erie Canal Effect" for upstate economic development. He secured $500,000 for high-speed rail planning in the FY2026 state budget. In the FY2026 budget, Cooney also secured a $54 million increase for non-MTA public transit capital funding, $100 million for the Consolidated Local Street and Highway Improvement Program, $100 million for Extreme Winter Recovery road and bridge repairs, and $150 million for the PAVE NY pavement repair program.

In 2025, Cooney authored the Move Over Law enhancement (S4649A), which increased penalties for drivers who fail to yield to emergency and hazard vehicles, raising the minimum fine from $150 to $275 for a first offense. In February 2026, he introduced legislation to allow New York workers to use pre-tax earnings for transportation expenses, including bus passes and rideshares, modeled after New York City's Commuter Benefits Law, in effect since 2016. He has also supported a proposal by the New York Public Transit Association to impose a $25 annual fee on upstate car registrations—extending an existing downstate surcharge—to increase funding for public transit systems in cities including Rochester, Albany, and Syracuse.

Following an August 2025 charter bus crash on the New York State Thruway in Pembroke that killed five people and injured more than 40, Cooney sponsored legislation (S8691) requiring charter bus drivers to deliver pre-trip safety briefings informing passengers of seat belt requirements. The Senate passed the bill 58–0 on April 29, 2026, and it cleared the Assembly in June, when it was sent to the governor. He has also proposed establishing a commercial driver's license training program to address driver shortages in the industry.

==== Economic development ====
In 2022, Cooney sponsored the Green CHIPS Act, legislation that provides state tax incentives to attract semiconductor and high-tech chip manufacturers to New York. The bill was signed into law by Governor Kathy Hochul in August 2022. In 2023, Cooney and fellow upstate senators co-authored a letter to the U.S. Department of Commerce supporting the NY SMART I-Corridor's application to the federal Tech Hubs Program, established under the CHIPS and Science Act. The corridor, encompassing Buffalo, Rochester, and Syracuse, subsequently received $40 million in federal funding and is projected to produce 25 percent of all U.S. semiconductors by the end of the decade.

In January 2026, Governor Hochul announced that French textile regeneration company Reju had selected a site at Eastman Business Park in Rochester for a $390 million facility, its first in North America. Cooney also helped secure $59.6 million in state funding in the FY2026 budget for the modernization of the Joseph A. Floreano Rochester Riverside Convention Center, the largest state investment in the facility since it opened in 1985. He secured $1 million in state funding for Rochester's Auditorium Theater, operated by the Rochester Broadway Theatre League, for capital improvements including lobby renovations and elevator upgrades. In December 2025, he secured a $1 million state grant for renovations to Kodak Hall at Eastman Theatre, the first major capital project at the venue since 2009.

In 2025, Cooney established the "Reinvesting in Organizations that Care" (ROC) Grants program, directing $1 million in state funding to local nonprofit organizations in the Rochester area amid reductions in federal funding. He also directed $100,000 in state funding to violence prevention programs in Rochester, split between Action for a Better Community and Rise Up Rochester.

==== Housing and anti-poverty ====
Cooney has introduced housing affordability legislation, including the HOME Act (S3150), which would establish a state program providing $10,000 grants to first-time homebuyers for down payments or closing costs, and the First Home Buyers Savings Program (S1157), which would allow tax-deductible savings accounts for first home purchases. In the FY2026 budget, he secured $50 million annually for the Housing Access Voucher Program to subsidize rent and $75 million for public housing authorities outside New York City.

Cooney has championed efforts to address child poverty in Rochester, where 48.2 percent of children live below the federal poverty level. He advocated for expanding the Empire State Child Tax Credit to $1,000 per child under age four and $500 for ages four through sixteen. In the FY2026 budget, he secured $25 million for Rochester anti-poverty initiatives.

==== Healthcare ====
In March 2026, Cooney introduced the Health Equity, Affordability, and Reform Act (HEARA) (S8614A), which would allow New Yorkers to buy into the state's Essential Plan, a comprehensive healthcare plan with zero monthly premiums and no deductibles. The legislation was introduced in response to federal funding cuts that threatened to eliminate coverage for approximately 450,000 New Yorkers who gained eligibility when the state expanded the plan in 2024 to include residents earning up to 250 percent of the federal poverty level. Under the proposal, payments would be based on a sliding scale tied to income, with the program designed to be revenue-neutral for the state.

==== Cannabis ====
Cooney co-sponsored and voted for the Marihuana Regulation and Taxation Act (MRTA) in 2021, which legalized adult-use cannabis in New York. Prior to the vote, he hosted a forum with over 150 community members in Rochester alongside advocates from the Drug Policy Alliance, Roc NORML, and Women Grow to discuss legalization's impact on the city. He served as Co-Chair of the Marijuana Task Force for the Black, Puerto Rican, Hispanic & Asian Legislative Caucus, which was instrumental in passing the MRTA.

On April 20, 2023, Senate Majority Leader Andrea Stewart-Cousins appointed Cooney as the first Chair of the newly created Senate Subcommittee on Cannabis, the first dedicated cannabis subcommittee in the history of the New York State Senate. On October 30, 2023, Cooney convened the subcommittee's first public hearing, held jointly with the Senate Finance, Agriculture, and Investigations and Government Operations committees, to examine challenges in the state's adult-use cannabis rollout.

In addition to the MRTA, Cooney has sponsored cannabis legislation in every session since taking office. In 2021, he introduced a bill establishing provisional cultivator licenses to allow farmers to begin planting cannabis before the Office of Cannabis Management was fully operational, and a bill to expand the MRTA's social equity provisions to include transgender and gender-nonbinary individuals as priority applicants. He also introduced legislation allowing licensed cannabis businesses to deduct ordinary business expenses on state tax returns, addressing the federal Section 280E restriction. In 2023, he introduced the Cannabis Adult-Use Transition Act (CAUTA), comprehensive legislation to streamline licensing and expand the Cannabis Advisory Board. In 2025, his medical cannabis reform bill (S3294A), which extended certifications from one year to two years, allowed digital certificates, and established out-of-state patient reciprocity, was signed into law by Governor Hochul.

In January 2026, Cooney introduced the Cannabis Supply Chain Integrity and Anti-Inversion Act (S8951B), which defines cannabis inversion—the introduction of illicit cannabis into the regulated supply chain—in statute and establishes civil penalties of up to $10,000 per day. The Senate passed the bill 60–1 on June 2, 2026, and it was substituted for the Assembly companion bill A10698B. Cooney also led efforts to repeal the state's THC potency tax.

==== Education and literacy ====
In 2025, Cooney and Assemblymember Harry Bronson co-sponsored legislation authorizing an additional $125 million for the Rochester City School District Modernization Program, bringing the Phase III total to $600 million. The bill was signed into law by Governor Hochul in November 2025.

Cooney has advocated for the expansion of Dolly Parton's Imagination Library in New York State, securing $500,000 in the FY2025 state budget and $1 million in FY2026 for the program, which provides free books monthly to children under age five. In November 2025, he delivered the 100,000th Imagination Library book in Monroe County. He also secured $917,000 for the renovation of the Greece Public Library and $435,000 for elevator replacement at the Rundel Memorial Building in Rochester. He also introduced the SMARTeeth Act (S3243A), establishing a five-year demonstration program in partnership with the University of Rochester to expand access to dental care using artificial intelligence in Monroe County.

==== AAPI advocacy ====
Cooney is the first member of the AAPI community to serve as Chairman of the Senate Committee on Transportation in New York State history. In May 2023, he organized the first Upstate AAPI Summit in New York State history, a sold-out event in Rochester that brought together over 200 members of the Asian American and Pacific Islander community for discussions on civic engagement, health care, and small business development.

==== Immigration ====
"Free Omar" rally at United Presbyterian Church, December 2025

In December 2025, Cooney spoke at a rally at United Presbyterian Church in downtown Rochester calling for the release of a local resident detained by ICE during what he believed was a routine check-in at immigration offices in Buffalo. Hundreds attended the rally, joined by Rochester City Council President Miguel Melendez and Councilmember Stanley Martin.

In January 2026, Cooney spoke at a rally on South Plymouth Avenue in Rochester organized in response to the federal immigration enforcement operation in Minneapolis and the shooting death of Renee Nicole Good. He was joined by representatives of the Somali and Bhutanese communities of Greater Rochester, the Legal Aid Society, and other advocacy groups.

==== Environment ====
Cooney received a perfect score of 100% on the New York League of Conservation Voters Environmental Scorecard in both 2023 and 2024.

== Recognition ==
- City & State New York "Power of Diversity: Asian 100" (2021)
- City & State New York "Transportation Power 100" (2024)
- City & State New York "Upstate Power 100" (2024, 2025)
- City & State New York "Trailblazers: Transportation" (2026)
- Indiaspora Government Leaders List (2021)
- New York League of Conservation Voters Environmental Scorecard, 100% (2023, 2024)
- Outstanding Eagle Scout Award (2026)
- Empire State Green Standard Alliance "Jeremy Cooney Appreciation Day", New York State Fair (2026)

== Personal life ==
Cooney lives in the City of Rochester with his wife, Diane Lu, a urological surgeon at the University of Rochester Medical Center. He is an Eagle Scout and has served as vice president of the Boy Scouts of America Seneca Waterways Council. In January 2026, he received the Outstanding Eagle Scout Award at the council's 75th annual Eagle Scout Mentor Dinner. Cooney is a member of the vestry at Christ Church Rochester (Episcopal) and has served on the boards of the Rochester Philharmonic Orchestra, the Rochester Area Community Foundation, and Episcopal SeniorLife Communities.

== Election results ==
=== 2018 ===
2018 New York State Senate election, District 56
Party	Candidate	Votes	%
Republican	Joseph Robach (incumbent)	53,091	55.5
Democratic	Jeremy Cooney	42,497	44.4
Total votes		95,615	100.0
Republican hold			

=== 2020 ===
2020 New York State Senate election, District 56
Primary election
Party	Candidate	Votes	%
Democratic	Jeremy Cooney	11,134	53.9
Democratic	Hilda Rosario Escher	4,887	23.7
Democratic	Sherita Traywick	4,634	22.4
Total votes		20,655	100.0
General election
Democratic	Jeremy Cooney	69,951	55.8
Republican	Michael Barry Jr.	55,355	44.2
Total votes		125,306	100.0
Democratic gain from Republican			

=== 2022 ===
2022 New York State Senate election, District 56
Party	Candidate	Votes	%
Democratic	Jeremy Cooney	51,704	52.9
Republican	Jim VanBrederode	43,686	44.7
Total votes		97,712	100.0

=== 2024 ===
2024 New York State Senate election, District 56
Party	Candidate	Votes	%
Democratic	Jeremy Cooney (incumbent)	76,341	58.9
Republican	Jim VanBrederode	53,292	41.1
Total votes		129,633	100.0
Democratic hold			

New York State Senate
Preceded by Joseph Robach	Member of the New York State Senate from the 56th district 2021–present	Incumbent
