= Marihuana Regulation and Taxation Act =

2021 New York State law legalizing cannabis

New York State Legislature
- Long title: An act to amend the tax law, the state finance law, the penal law, and other laws, in relation to the regulation, taxation, and use of cannabis
- Territorial extent: New York State
- Enacted: March 30, 2021
- Assented to: March 31, 2021
- Signed by: Governor Andrew Cuomo
- Commenced: March 31, 2021

Legislative history
- Bill title: S854-A / A1248-A
- Bill citation: Chapter 92 of the Laws of 2021
- Introduced by: Senator Liz Krueger / Assembly Majority Leader Crystal Peoples-Stokes
- Status: In force

The Marihuana Regulation and Taxation Act (MRTA) is a New York State law that legalized the sale and use of cannabis for adults aged 21 and over. The legislation was passed by the New York State Legislature on March 30, 2021, and signed into law by Governor Andrew Cuomo on March 31, 2021. The law created the Office of Cannabis Management (OCM) and the Cannabis Control Board to regulate the state's adult-use, medical, and cannabinoid hemp programs.

The MRTA is notable for its social equity provisions, including automatic expungement of prior marijuana convictions and a target of awarding 50 percent of all adult-use licenses to social and economic equity applicants. New York's legal cannabis market surpassed $2.5 billion in cumulative retail sales by November 2025, with 556 licensed dispensaries operating statewide.

== Background ==
=== Previous legalization attempts ===
New York first decriminalized possession of small amounts of marijuana in 1977, but a "public view" exception in the law was used for decades to justify racially disparate arrests, with Black New Yorkers approximately four times more likely to be arrested than white New Yorkers despite similar usage rates.

Senator Liz Krueger first introduced the MRTA in December 2013, and reintroduced it every session thereafter with Assembly Majority Leader Crystal Peoples-Stokes as the Assembly sponsor. The bill stalled repeatedly; in 2019, disagreements over tax revenue allocation prevented a vote before the end of session. That year, Governor Cuomo signed further decriminalization measures removing the "public view" loophole and reclassifying possession of up to two ounces as a violation rather than a crime.

In 2020, Governor Cuomo introduced his own competing proposal, the Cannabis Regulation and Taxation Act (CRTA), as part of the FY2021 executive budget. The CRTA proposed significantly higher tax rates, gubernatorial control over all board appointments without legislative oversight, and lower possession limits. NORML rated the legislature's MRTA an "A−" and the governor's CRTA a "C−". Legalization efforts were derailed by the COVID-19 pandemic. In January 2021, Cuomo included legalization in his State of the State address, and negotiations between the governor's office and the legislature succeeded, with the legislature's MRTA framework largely prevailing.

=== Passage ===
The Marijuana Task Force of the Black, Puerto Rican, Hispanic & Asian Legislative Caucus, co-chaired by Senator Jeremy Cooney, helped build legislative support for the bill, with a focus on ensuring that social equity provisions and community reinvestment remained central to the final legislation.

The MRTA passed the New York State Senate by a vote of 40–23 on March 30, 2021, and the New York State Assembly by a vote of 100–49 the same day. Three Democratic senators—Joseph Addabbo, Simcha Felder, and Anna Kaplan—voted against the bill along with 20 Republicans. Governor Cuomo signed the bill into law the following day. Personal possession provisions took effect immediately upon signing.

== Provisions ==
=== Possession and cultivation ===
The MRTA allows adults aged 21 and over to possess up to three ounces of cannabis flower or 24 grams of cannabis concentrate, and to store up to five pounds at home in a secure location. Adults may cultivate up to three mature and three immature plants per person, with a maximum of six mature and six immature plants per household. Home cultivation for adult use became legal approximately 18 months after the first retail sale.

The law bars police from using marijuana odor as justification for a traffic stop or vehicle search.

=== Regulatory structure ===
The MRTA created the Office of Cannabis Management (OCM) and the Cannabis Control Board (CCB), a five-member governing body, to regulate adult-use, medical, and cannabinoid hemp cannabis programs in New York. The chair of the CCB is appointed by the governor with the advice and consent of the Senate; the governor makes two additional appointments, the Senate Temporary President appoints one member, and the Assembly Speaker appoints one.

The law established a multi-tier licensing system including cultivator, processor, distributor, nursery, cooperative, microbusiness, retail dispensary, on-site consumption lounge, and delivery licenses. To prevent vertical integration and dominance by multi-state cannabis operators, the MRTA generally prohibits growers and processors from holding retail licenses, with limited exceptions for existing medical Registered Organizations.

=== Taxation ===
The original tax structure, effective April 1, 2022, imposed a potency-based distributor excise tax calculated per milligram of THC: 0.5 cents per milligram for flower, 0.8 cents for concentrates, and 3 cents for edibles, plus a 9 percent state retail excise tax and a 4 percent local tax (1 percent to the county, 3 percent to the municipality).

Effective June 1, 2024, the potency-based THC tax was eliminated and replaced with a simpler 9 percent wholesale distributor excise tax, while the 9 percent state retail tax and 4 percent local tax remained unchanged.

After administrative costs, cannabis tax revenue is allocated as follows: 40 percent to a Community Grants Reinvestment Fund for communities disproportionately impacted by cannabis prohibition, 40 percent to education, and 20 percent to drug treatment and public education programs.

=== Social equity ===
The MRTA set a target of awarding 50 percent of all adult-use licenses to Social and Economic Equity (SEE) applicants, defined as individuals from communities disproportionately impacted by cannabis prohibition, minority-owned and women-owned businesses, distressed farmers, and service-disabled veterans. As of late 2025, approximately 54 percent of adult-use licenses had been awarded to SEE applicants.

The law mandated automatic expungement of prior marijuana convictions under certain Penal Law sections, without requiring any paperwork from affected individuals. An estimated 108,000 to 150,000 convictions were eligible for expungement.

=== Municipal opt-out ===
The MRTA allowed municipalities to opt out of hosting retail dispensaries and on-site consumption lounges by passing a local law before December 31, 2021. Approximately 34 percent of all municipalities opted out. Municipalities that opted out may rejoin at any time, but those that opted in cannot later opt out.

== Implementation ==
=== First dispensaries ===
The first retail licenses were issued through the Conditional Adult-Use Retail Dispensary (CAURD) program, which prioritized applicants with prior cannabis convictions and successful business experience. The Cannabis Control Board issued the first 36 CAURD licenses on November 21, 2022. The first legal adult-use dispensary in New York, Housing Works Cannabis Co., opened in Manhattan on December 29, 2022.

=== Delays and regulatory overhaul ===
The rollout of New York's legal cannabis market was widely criticized as slow and chaotic. By early 2024, approximately 85 licensed dispensaries were open statewide, while an estimated 1,400 unlicensed cannabis shops operated in New York City alone.

In October 2023, the newly created Senate Subcommittee on Cannabis, chaired by Senator Jeremy Cooney, held its first public hearing jointly with the Senate Finance, Agriculture, and Investigations committees to examine challenges in the adult-use rollout. In March 2024, Governor Kathy Hochul ordered a 30-day assessment of the OCM led by Office of General Services Commissioner Jeanette Moy. The assessment found "significant structural limitations" in the agency's operations. OCM executive director Chris Alexander resigned in May 2024. Reforms included a 90-day service-level agreement for retail license applications, additional enforcement staff, and new public dashboards.

=== Illicit market enforcement ===
The proliferation of unlicensed cannabis shops became a major challenge to the legal market. In May 2023, Governor Hochul signed legislation authorizing the padlocking of unlicensed stores, with fines starting at $10,000 per day. Between December 2023 and November 2024, OCM inspectors conducted over 1,200 inspections and seized more than $67 million worth of illicit products. In 2025, the New York Attorney General's office secured a $6 million judgment against an unlicensed cannabis store in Brooklyn.

== Market performance ==
New York's legal adult-use cannabis market generated $317 million in retail sales in 2023 and exceeded $1 billion in 2024, the first year to surpass that threshold. By November 2025, cumulative retail sales surpassed $2.5 billion, with 556 licensed dispensaries open statewide. Through November 2025, the state collected nearly $341 million in cannabis tax revenue from medical and adult-use sales combined.

== Legal challenges ==
Multiple lawsuits delayed the MRTA's implementation. In 2022, military veterans sued arguing that the CAURD program violated the law by not simultaneously offering licenses to other equity groups. A federal judge issued a preliminary injunction blocking CAURD licenses in five of fourteen regions, an order that was not lifted until March 2023.

In Variscite NY Four, LLC v. New York State Cannabis Control Board, two California-based companies challenged New York's licensing priority for applicants with New York–specific cannabis convictions as a violation of the Dormant Commerce Clause. In August 2025, the United States Court of Appeals for the Second Circuit ruled 2–1 that the Dormant Commerce Clause applies to cannabis licensing, holding that New York's in-state conviction preference was facially protectionist. The decision was the first federal appellate ruling to hold that the Dormant Commerce Clause restricts state protectionism in a federally prohibited market.

== See also ==
- Cannabis in New York
- Legality of cannabis by U.S. jurisdiction
- Cannabis Control Board (New York)
