= Rochester Broadway Theatre League =

Nonprofit performing arts presenter in Rochester, New York

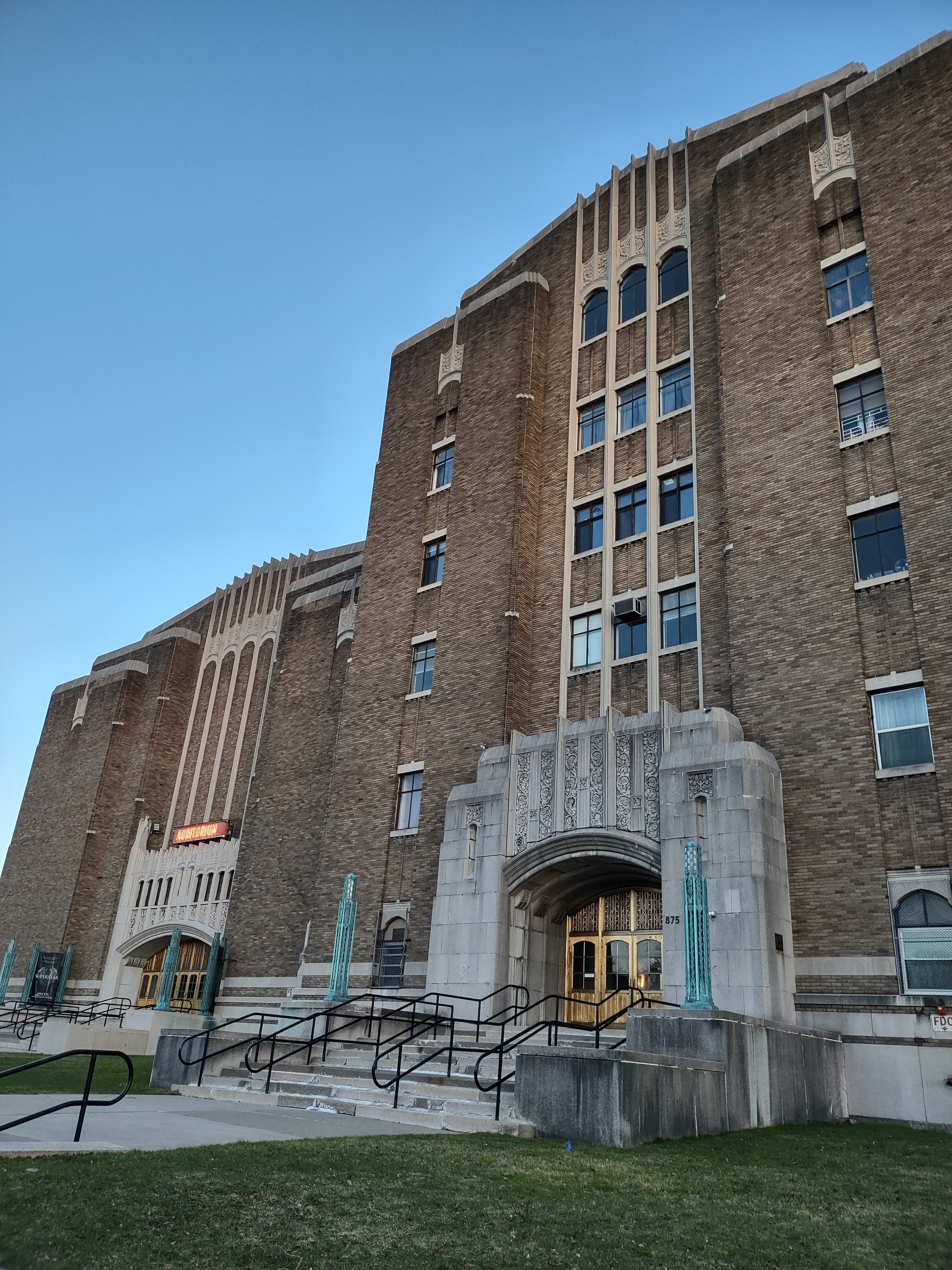
- The West Herr Auditorium Theatre in 2024
- Interactive map of Rochester Broadway Theatre League
- Former names: Masonic Temple of Rochester (1930–1989); Auditorium Center (1989–2023)
- Address: 875 East Main Street
- Location: Rochester, New York, U.S.
- Coordinates: 43°9′38″N 77°35′20″W
- Owner: Rochester Broadway Theatre League
- Capacity: 2,464 (West Herr Auditorium Theatre)
- Type: Performing arts center

Construction
- Opened: 1930 (building); 1957 (organization)

Website
- rbtl.org

The Rochester Broadway Theatre League (RBTL) is a 501(c)(3) nonprofit organization based in Rochester, New York, that operates the West Herr Performing Arts Center (formerly the Auditorium Center) and presents national touring Broadway productions, concerts, and arts education programs. Founded in 1957 as an all-volunteer organization, RBTL has grown into one of the largest performing arts presenters in upstate New York, with annual revenue of approximately $17.7 million and total assets of $20.7 million as of fiscal year 2024. Its arts education programs serve more than 8,000 students annually.

== History ==
=== Building history ===
The building at 875 East Main Street in Rochester was originally constructed as the Masonic Temple of Rochester. Its cornerstone was laid in 1928, and the temple was dedicated on May 24, 1930, at a cost of $2,225,000. The building featured an Art Deco-style auditorium with a seating capacity of approximately 3,000 and elaborate ornamental plasterwork, including 64 squirrels sculpted into the dome ceiling plaster.

In 1957, the Rochester Broadway Theatre League was established as an all-volunteer nonprofit to present touring performing arts productions in the Rochester area.

=== Revival ===
In the early 1980s, Albert Nocciolino, a theatrical promoter, was approached by the executive director of the Rochester Philharmonic Orchestra about bringing Broadway touring productions to Rochester. Nocciolino launched the first Broadway season in approximately 1981–82, beginning with a production of Gigi at the Eastman Theatre. His company, NAC Entertainment, has served as RBTL's Broadway season partner and presenter for more than 40 years.

In 1989, the Masonic organization sold the temple, and the building was renamed the Auditorium Center.

=== Acquisition and rebranding ===
In 2004, RBTL purchased the theatre portion of the Auditorium Center and undertook a renovation that included installing new seats, reducing the auditorium's capacity from approximately 3,000 to 2,464.

In March 2023, RBTL acquired the remaining portions of the Auditorium Center for $2.4 million, gaining full ownership of the entire building.

In August 2023, RBTL announced a naming rights partnership with West Herr Automotive Group, one of the largest automotive dealer groups in the northeastern United States. The complex was rebranded as the West Herr Performing Arts Center and the main auditorium as the West Herr Auditorium Theatre.

== Venues ==
=== West Herr Auditorium Theatre ===
The West Herr Auditorium Theatre is a 2,464-seat Art Deco theatre located within the West Herr Performing Arts Center at 875 East Main Street in Rochester. The auditorium is noted for its ornamental plasterwork, which includes 64 squirrels sculpted into the ceiling dome.

=== Wurlitzer organ ===
The theatre houses a Wurlitzer 4/23 theatre pipe organ (Opus 1951) with 1,619 pipes. The instrument was originally installed in 1928 at the RKO Palace Theatre in Rochester and was rescued and relocated to the Auditorium Theatre by the Rochester Theater Organ Society (RTOS).

=== Joseph A. Floreano Entertainment & Education Center ===
The Joseph A. Floreano Rochester Convention Center Entertainment & Education Center occupies the main level of the complex and serves as a gathering space for events, receptions, and educational programming.

=== Cathedral Hall ===
Cathedral Hall, a former Masonic lodge room within the building, is planned for development as a performance and event space as part of the PROJECT RESTOURATION initiative.

== Programming ==
RBTL's flagship programming is the M&T Bank Broadway Season, which presents seven to eight national touring Broadway productions each year at the West Herr Auditorium Theatre. The Broadway season has been presented in partnership with Albert Nocciolino and NAC Entertainment for more than four decades.

Nocciolino has been a Tony Award voting member since 1982 and has served on the executive committee of The Broadway League. He was a founding member and chairman of the National Touring Theatre Council and a founding member and past president of the Independent Presenters Network (IPN). Through NAC Entertainment, he also presents Broadway touring seasons in Buffalo, Syracuse, Binghamton, Elmira, Scranton, and Erie.

== Education ==
RBTL operates arts education programs that reach more than 8,000 students annually across the greater Rochester region.

=== A.R.T.S. Partners ===
The A.R.T.S. Partners program integrates arts into classroom curricula for students in grades UPK through 12, connecting schools with performing arts experiences and educational resources.

=== Stars of Tomorrow ===
Since 1999, RBTL has produced the Stars of Tomorrow program, which recognizes outstanding high school musical theatre productions in a format modeled on the Tony Awards. Winners of the Stars of Tomorrow competition advance through the NYC Bound program to compete at the National High School Musical Theatre Awards, known as the Jimmy Awards, in New York City.

== PROJECT RESTOURATION ==
In 2024, RBTL launched PROJECT RESTOURATION, a $65 million, five-year capital improvement initiative targeting the complete renovation and restoration of the West Herr Performing Arts Center. The project is intended to be completed by 2030, coinciding with the building's centennial.

Phase One, budgeted at approximately $20 million, was completed in January 2026. It included new exterior steps, restored brass entrance doors, a new west entrance, elevator access for improved accessibility, a new lounge, expanded concession areas, and renovated restrooms.

Subsequent phases are planned to expand the Rothschild Lounge, restore the building's historic fireplace, develop additional performance spaces, and renovate Cathedral Hall.

Funding sources for the project include a $2.9 million grant from the New York State Council on the Arts (NYSCA) announced in May 2025, $1 million in state capital funding secured by New York State Senator Jeremy Cooney announced in July 2025, and contributions associated with the West Herr naming-rights partnership.

== Connection to state government ==
In July 2025, New York State Senator Jeremy Cooney secured $1 million in state capital funds for the renovation of the Joseph A. Floreano Entertainment & Education Center as part of the PROJECT RESTOURATION initiative. Cooney stated that the investment was "proof of our continued commitment to the arts outside of NYC." RBTL Chairman and CEO Arnie Rothschild said of Cooney: "Senator Cooney is the first to listen, the fastest to act, and always fights hard to bring money to worthwhile projects."

Cooney had previously called for $20 million in state funding for upstate arts organizations in 2022 and had separately secured more than $200,000 in state funding for The Little Theatre in Rochester.

== Leadership ==
- Arnie Rothschild – Chairman and CEO
- John C. Parkhurst – Chief Operating Officer
- Albert Nocciolino – President and CEO, NAC Entertainment (Broadway Season partner and presenter)

== See also ==
- Eastman Theatre
- Rochester Philharmonic Orchestra
- The Broadway League
- Jimmy Awards
