= Andrea Bailey =

American politician (born 1972)

Member of the New York State Assembly from the 133rd district
- Incumbent
- Assumed office January 1, 2025
- Preceded by: Marjorie Byrnes

Personal details
- Born: November 1972 (age 53) Avon, New York, U.S.
- Party: Republican
- Spouse: Jon
- Children: 3
- Website: Campaign website

Andrea Bailey (born November 1972) is an American politician who has served as a member of the New York State Assembly from the 133rd district since 2025. A member of the Republican Party, she previously served as the clerk of Livingston County from 2020 to 2024.

Bailey announced her candidacy in January 2024, after incumbent assemblywoman Marjorie Byrnes announced her retirement, and was endorsed by Byrnes as her successor. She defeated Democratic unionist Colleen Walsh-Williams in the November 2024 general election with 65% of the vote.

Bailey resides in Geneseo, New York, along with her husband Jon and their three children.
