= New York's 137th State Assembly district =

American legislative district

Assemblymember
Demond Meeks; D–Rochester

New York's 137th State Assembly district is one of the 150 districts in the New York State Assembly. It has been represented by Demond Meeks since 2020, succeeding David Gantt.

== Geography ==
District 137 is in Monroe County. It contains most of the city of Rochester and the town of Gates, west of the city.

== Recent election results ==
=== 2026 ===
2026 New York State Assembly election, District 137
Primary election
Party	Candidate	Votes	%
Democratic	Demond Meeks (incumbent)	4,801	81.3
Democratic	Mercedes Vazquez-Simmons	1,100	18.6
Write-in		6	0.0
Total votes		5,907	100.0
General election
Democratic	Demond Meeks		
Working Families	Demond Meeks		
Total	Demond Meeks (incumbent)		
Republican	Dave Ferris		
Conservative	Dave Ferris		
Total	Dave Ferris		
Mercedes Simmons Cares	Mercedes Vazquez-Simmons		
Write-in			
Total votes			100.0

=== 2024 ===
2024 New York State Assembly election, District 137
Primary election
Party	Candidate	Votes	%
Democratic	Demond Meeks (incumbent)	3,467	66.2
Democratic	Willie Lightfoot	1,765	33.7
Write-in		2	0.1
Total votes		5,234	100
General election
Democratic	Demond Meeks	24,629	
Working Families	Demond Meeks	2,062	
Total	Demond Meeks (incumbent)	26,691	71.6
Republican	Marcus Williams	9,055	
Conservative	Marcus Williams	1,518	
Total	Marcus Williams	10,573	28.4
Write-in		17	0.0
Total votes		37,281	100.0
Democratic hold			

=== 2022 ===
2022 New York State Assembly election, District 137
Party	Candidate	Votes	%
Democratic	Demond Meeks	15,757	
Working Families	Demond Meeks	1,143	
Total	Demond Meeks (incumbent)	16,900	67.9
Republican	Marcus Williams	6,640	
Conservative	Marcus Williams	1,350	
Total	Marcus Williams	7,990	32.1
Write-in		9	0.0
Total votes		24,899	100.0
Democratic hold			

=== 2020 ===
2020 New York State Assembly election, District 137
Primary election
Party	Candidate	Votes	%
Democratic	Demond Meeks	4,666	44.1
Democratic	Ernest Flagler	3,516	33.2
Democratic	Ann Lewis	2,045	19.3
Democratic	Silvano Orsi	359	3.4
Write-in		2	0.0
Total votes		10,588	100
General election
Democratic	Demond Meeks	30,410	
Working Families	Demond Meeks	3,542	
Total	Demond Meeks	33,952	99.6
Write-in		153	0.4
Total votes		34,105	100.0
Democratic hold			

=== 2018 ===
2018 New York State Assembly election, District 137
Primary election
Party	Candidate	Votes	%
Democratic	David Gantt (incumbent)	4,752	58.3
Democratic	Ann Lewis	3,398	41.7
Write-in		0	0.0
Total votes		8,150	100
General election
Democratic	David Gantt (incumbent)	22,825	97.0
Write-in		700	3.0
Total votes		23,525	100.0
Democratic hold			

=== 2016 ===
2016 New York State Assembly election, District 137
Party	Candidate	Votes	%
Democratic	David Gantt (incumbent)	31,738	99.1
Write-in		291	0.9
Total votes		32,029	100.0
Democratic hold			

=== 2014 ===
2014 New York State Assembly election, District 137
Party	Candidate	Votes	%
Democratic	David Gantt (incumbent)	13,288	78.3
Rochester & Gates United Neighbors	Ann Lewis	3,622	21.3
Write-in		60	0.4
Total votes		16,970	100.0
Democratic hold			

=== 2012 ===
2012 New York State Assembly election, District 137
Primary election
Party	Candidate	Votes	%
Democratic	David Gantt (incumbent)	3,399	68.6
Democratic	Jose Cruz	992	20.0
Democratic	John Lightfoot	547	11.1
Write-in		14	0.3
Total votes		4,952	100
General election
Democratic	David Gantt (incumbent)	33,081	87.9
Green	Andrew Langdon	4,498	12.0
Write-in		66	0.2
Total votes		37,645	100.0
Democratic hold			
