= Demond Meeks =

American politician

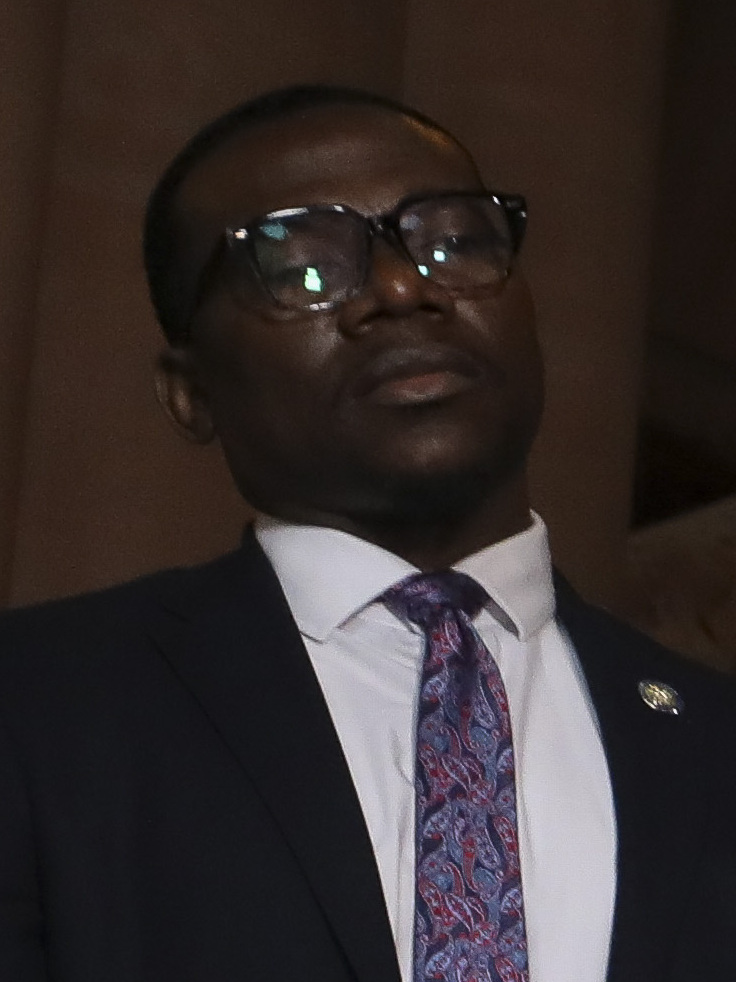

Member of the New York State Assembly from the 137th district
- Incumbent
- Assumed office November 12, 2020
- Preceded by: David Gantt

Personal details
- Born: February 5, 1979 (age 47) Rochester, New York, U.S.
- Party: Democratic
- Education: SUNY-Brockport (B.A.)
- Website: Official website Campaign website

Demond Meeks is an American union organizer and politician who currently serves in the New York State Assembly from the 137th district as a member of the Democratic Party. Meeks is the second African American to represent Monroe County in the Assembly; David Gantt, his predecessor, was the first.

== Early career ==
After graduating from Monroe Community College and SUNY-Brockport, Meeks began working as a labor organizer. He serves as an administrative organizer for 1199SEIU, and is an active member of the Coalition of Black Trade Unionists. He has received additional labor-related trainings and certifications from Cornell University.

== New York State Assembly ==
In 2020, Assemblyman David Gantt announced that he would not seek reelection to the 137th district. Meeks announced his campaign for the seat, and won the Democratic primary against county legislator Ernest Flagler and two other candidates. He faced no opposition in the general election. As Gantt had died over the summer, leaving the seat vacant, Meeks was sworn in early on November 12, 2020.

== Personal life ==
Meeks lives in Rochester with his wife, Cratrina, and their children.
