= Marjorie Byrnes =

American politician (born 1960)

Marjorie L. Byrnes

Member of the New York State Assembly from the 133rd district
- In office January 9, 2019 – December 31, 2024
- Preceded by: Joseph Errigo
- Succeeded by: Andrea Bailey

Personal details
- Born: September 22, 1960 (age 65)
- Party: Republican
- Children: 2
- Website: Official website Campaign website

Marjorie L. Byrnes (born September 22, 1960) is an American politician and attorney from the state of New York. A Republican, Byrnes represented the 133rd district of the New York State Assembly, covering Livingston County and other areas to the south of Rochester, from 2019 to 2024.

== Career ==
Byrnes worked as an attorney for 32 years. In that time, she served variously as a judge with the Rochester City Court, as an assistant district attorney for Monroe County, and most recently as court attorney to Livingston County Court Judge Dennis Cohen.

After her retirement from the court system in 2017, Byrnes became a Caledonia Village Trustee.

== Electoral history ==
In 2018, Byrnes announced that she would launch a primary challenge to Republican incumbent Joseph Errigo, who had been selected by Republican leadership for the 133rd district in 2016 following Bill Nojay's suicide. Byrnes easily defeated Errigo, with 61% of the vote to his 39%.

That November, Byrnes defeated Democrat Barbara Baer with 55% of the vote. She took office on January 9, 2019.

== Personal life ==
Byrnes has lived in Caledonia for 12 years.
