= Hyatt Regency Rochester =

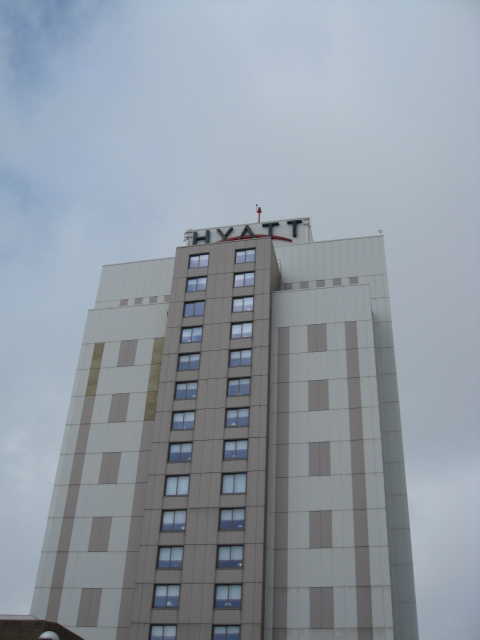

General information
- Status: Completed
- Type: Hotel
- Location: 125 East Main Street, Rochester, NY 14604
- Coordinates: 43°09′23.5″N 77°36′30.5″W
- Construction started: 1985
- Completed: 1990
- Opening: 1992

Height
- Roof: 83 m (272 ft)

Technical details
- Floor count: 25

Design and construction
- Architect: CENTRIA Architectural Systems

The Hyatt Regency Rochester is a hotel in Rochester, New York. It is located at 125 E Main St. Standing at 271 feet (83 meters) tall with 25 floors, it is the seventh tallest building in Rochester. It is part of the Hyatt Regency brand of hotels and has 341 rooms. The hotel is connected via a skyway to the Joseph A. Floreano Rochester Riverside Convention Center.

== History ==
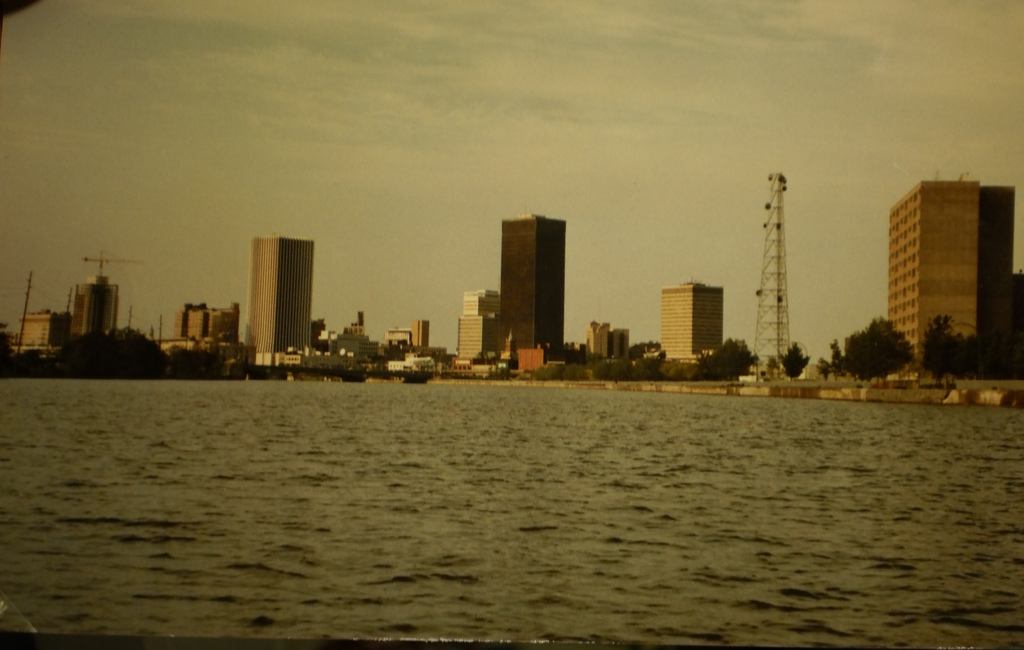
Rochester skyline, 1987, with topped-out Hyatt on left.

Ground was broken for the $40 million hotel in 1986, with opening set for late 1987, but construction stalled in early 1987 with just the steel framework complete. Work was restarted in 1990 and the hotel opened in 1992.

== See also ==
- List of tallest buildings in Rochester, New York
