= ROC the Riverway =

Urban revitalization initiative in Rochester, New York

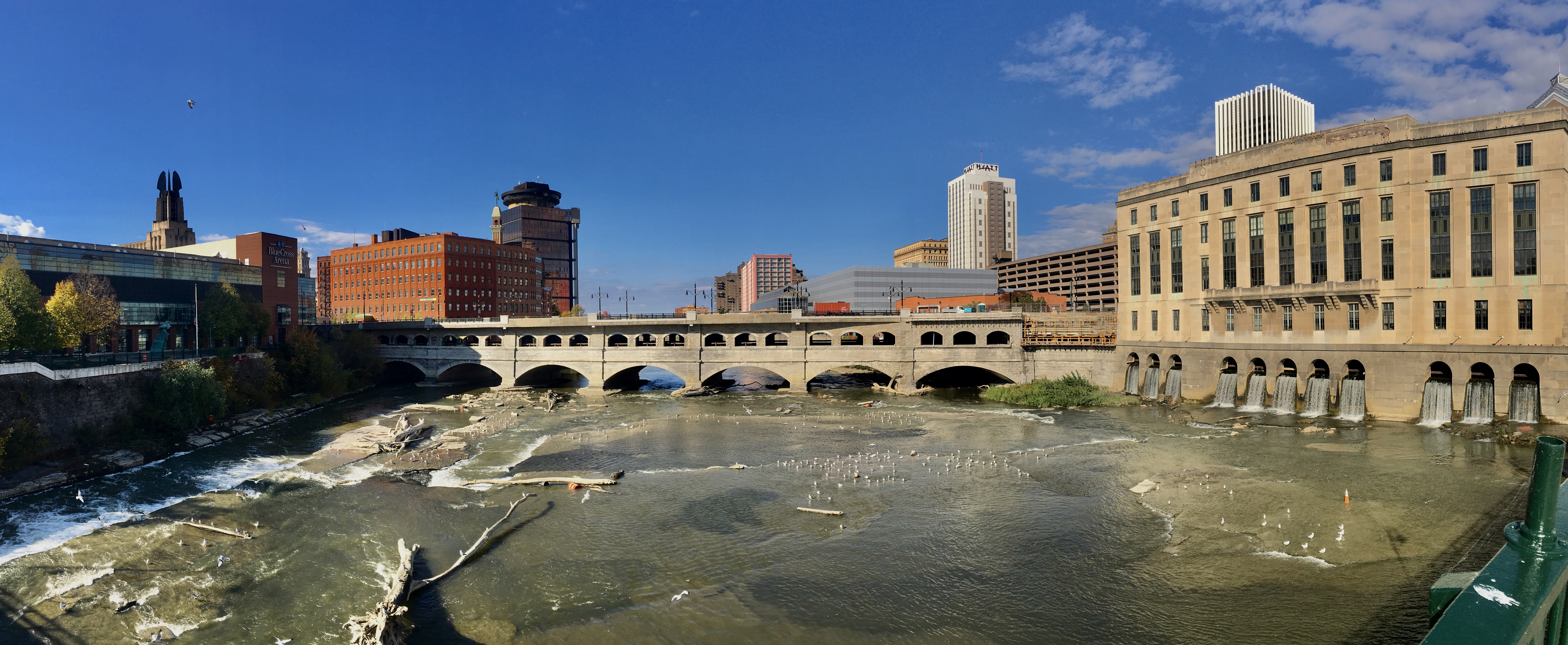
Genesee River corridor in downtown Rochester

ROC the Riverway is a multi-phase urban revitalization initiative focused on the Genesee River corridor in downtown Rochester, New York. Announced in February 2017 by Governor Andrew Cuomo with an initial $50 million state commitment, the initiative encompasses more than two dozen projects intended to improve public access to the river, create new parks and trails, and stimulate economic development along both banks of the Genesee through downtown Rochester.

As of 2026, New York State has committed over $100 million to the initiative, which has leveraged more than $800 million in private investment.

== Background ==
The initiative originated from the Finger Lakes Forward Upstate Revitalization Initiative, a $500 million state investment in the Finger Lakes region awarded in December 2015. In February 2017, Governor Cuomo pledged $50 million from this fund to revitalize Rochester's downtown riverfront, citing the success of the Canalside waterfront redevelopment in Buffalo as a model.

In February 2018, Governor Cuomo and Rochester Mayor Lovely Warren announced a 12-person advisory panel to oversee the initiative, co-chaired by Anne Kress, president of Monroe Community College, and Bob Duffy, president and CEO of the Greater Rochester Chamber of Commerce. On August 1, 2018, the panel unveiled a Phase 1 Vision Plan identifying 13 priority projects to receive the initial $50 million.

Governor Kathy Hochul continued and expanded the initiative after taking office in August 2021, committing additional state funding for Phase 2 projects.

== Projects ==
=== Completed ===
- Austin Steward Plaza – A $20 million redesign of the former Charles Carroll Plaza at the corner of Main Street and State Street. The plaza was renamed in 2024 after Austin Steward, an abolitionist and educator who achieved freedom from slavery and established a school for Black children in Rochester. The project received $12 million in state funding and was dedicated on July 9, 2024.
- Brewery Line Trail – A 1,200-foot trail segment connecting the Pont De Rennes bridge to the High Falls overlook, completed in May 2023.
- Pont de Rennes Bridge – Structural rehabilitation of the wrought-iron pedestrian bridge originally opened in 1891 and renamed in 1982 after Rochester's French sister city, Rennes. The $9 million restoration was completed in 2024.
- Frank and Janet Lamb Sister Cities Bridge – A $5.2 million renovation of the pedestrian bridge completed in November 2024, including structural repairs, an ADA-compliant flyover, and plaques representing Rochester's sister cities.
- Genesee Gateway Park – A $6.8 million park with playground, basketball court, boat launch, and trail upgrades, completed in 2023.
- ROC City Skatepark (Phase 1) – Rochester's first public skatepark, opened on November 5, 2020.
- Rundel Library North Terrace – An $8.1 million structural repair and reopening of the outdoor terrace at the Rundel Library.
- Constellation Brands Global Headquarters – The Fortune 500 beverage company relocated its global headquarters to a renovated 170,000-square-foot campus in the Aqueduct district, a $50 million private investment completed in June 2024.

=== Under construction ===
- Rochester Riverside Convention Center – A $13 million renovation including a Main Street addition and new event space, with construction beginning in January 2025.
- ROC City Skatepark (Phase 2) – A 20,000-square-foot expansion with construction beginning in October 2025 and completion anticipated in fall 2026.

=== In planning ===
- Aqueduct Reimagined – The centerpiece project, a redesign of the historic Rochester Aqueduct with an estimated cost of $175 million. An updated design was unveiled in October 2024, with design completion anticipated in 2027.
- High Falls State Park – A proposed 40-acre state park centered on High Falls, a 96-foot waterfall on the Genesee River. It would be the first New York state park within the City of Rochester. A framework plan was released in October 2025, with phased construction expected to begin in late 2026 pending environmental remediation.
- Genesee Crossroads Park – A $5 million revitalization of the park adjacent to Austin Steward Plaza, with construction anticipated in spring 2026.
- Rochester Riverside Hotel – A $61 million redevelopment converting the former hotel into 133 hotel rooms and 161 apartments, announced in November 2024.
