= Roger J. Robach =

American politician

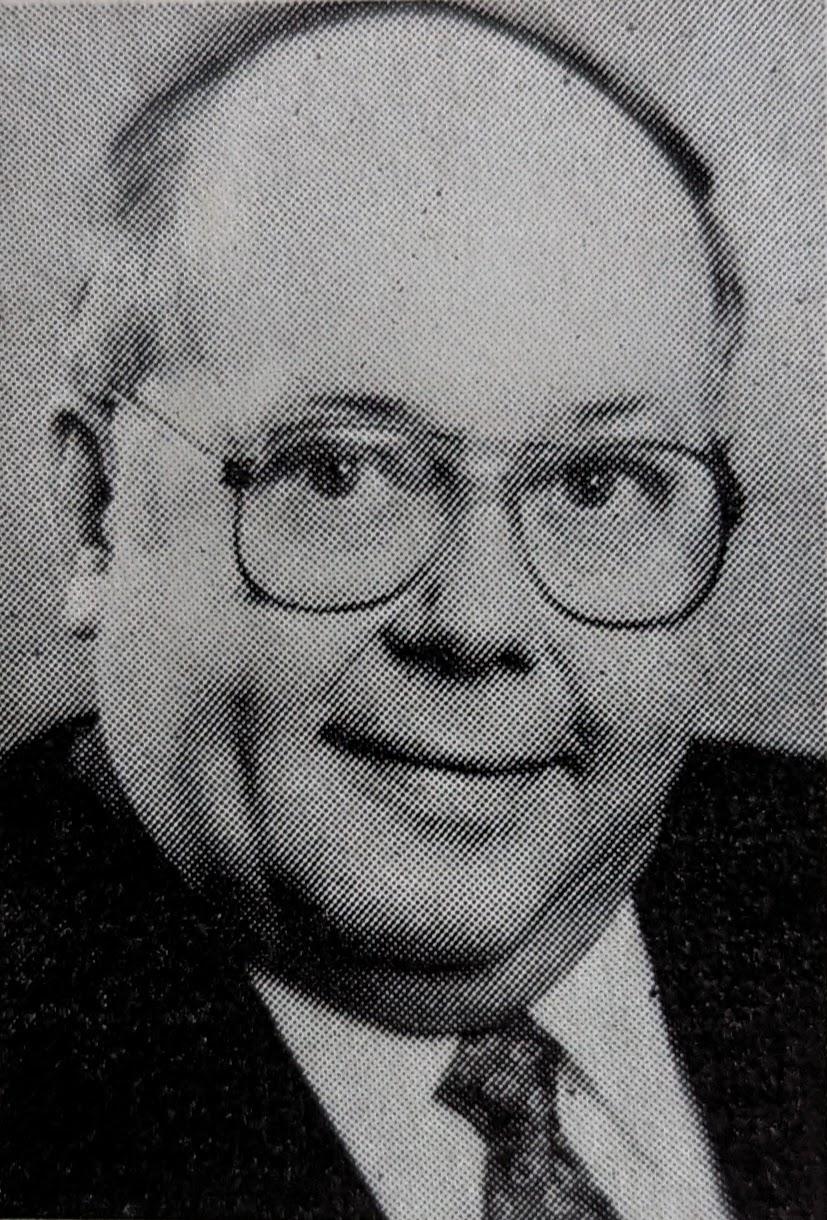

Member of the New York State Assembly from the 134th district
- In office January 1, 1975 – September 29, 1991
- Preceded by: William M. Steinfeldt
- Succeeded by: Joseph Robach

Personal details
- Born: Rochester, New York, U.S.
- Died: September 29, 1991 (aged 57)
- Party: Democratic
- Children: 3, including Joseph Robach
- Education: University of Rochester (BS)

Roger J. Robach (June 21, 1934 – September 29, 1991) was an American politician from New York who served in the New York State Assembly from 1975 to 1991.

== Life and career ==
Robach was born on June 21, 1934, in Rochester, New York. He attended Holy Apostles School. Robach continued his studies for six years at Catholic seminaries, but eventually abandoned his pursuit of the priesthood. On September 1, 1956, he married Teresa Fallocco. The Robachs had three children, among them future Assemblymember and State Senator Joseph Robach (born 1958). From 1956 to 1958, Roger Robach served in the U.S. Army. He graduated with a degree in business administration from the University of Rochester in 1966. Robach retired from Eastman Kodak in 1985.

Robach entered politics as a Democrat, and was a member of the Monroe County Legislature from 1973 to 1974. He was a member of the New York State Assembly from 1975 until his death in 1991, sitting in the 181st, 182nd, 183rd, 184th, 185th, 186th, 187th, 188th and 189th New York State Legislatures. He served as Deputy Assembly Majority Leader from 1987 to 1991.

Robach died of heart disease on September 29, 1991, at Strong Memorial Hospital in Rochester, New York. He was buried at Holy Sepulchre Cemetery.

New York State Assembly
Preceded by William M. Steinfeldt	New York State Assembly; 134th District; 1975–1991	Succeeded by Joseph Robach
