= New York's 56th State Senate district =

American legislative district

Senator
Jeremy Cooney; D–Rochester
- Registration: 43.2% Democratic; 26.1% Republican; 23.7% No party preference
- Demographics: 65% White; 17% Black; 11% Hispanic; 4% Asian
- Population (2017): 290,184
- Registered voters: 179,667

New York's 56th State Senate district is one of 63 districts in the New York State Senate. It has been represented by Democrat Jeremy Cooney since 2021, succeeding Republican Joseph Robach.

== Geography ==
District 56 is located entirely within Monroe County in Western New York, including much of western Rochester and its surrounding suburbs of Brighton, Gates, Greece, and Henrietta.

The district overlaps with New York's 25th congressional district and with the 134th, 136th, 137th, and 138th districts of the New York State Assembly.

== Recent election results ==
=== 2026 ===
2026 New York State Senate election, District 56
Party	Candidate	Votes	%
Democratic	Jeremy Cooney		
Working Families	Jeremy Cooney		
Total	Jeremy Cooney (incumbent)		
Republican	Orlando Rivera		
Conservative	Orlando Rivera		
Total	Orlando Rivera		
Write-in			
Total votes			

=== 2024 ===
2024 New York State Senate election, District 56
Party	Candidate	Votes	%
Democratic	Jeremy Cooney	70,091	
Working Families	Jeremy Cooney	6,250	
Total	Jeremy Cooney (incumbent)	76,341	58.9
Republican	Jim VanBrederode	45,830	
Conservative	Jim VanBrederode	7,462	
Total	Jim VanBrederode	53,292	41.1
Write-in		69	0.0
Total votes		129,702	100.0
Democratic hold			

=== 2022 ===
2022 New York State Senate election, District 56
Party	Candidate	Votes	%
Democratic	Jeremy Cooney	47,782	
Working Families	Jeremy Cooney	3,922	
Total	Jeremy Cooney (incumbent)	51,704	54.2
Republican	Jim VanBrederode	35,879	
Conservative	Jim VanBrederode	7,295	
Independence	Jim VanBrederode	512	
Total	Jim VanBrederode	43,686	45.8
Write-in		31	0.0
Total votes		95,421	100.0
Democratic hold			

=== 2020 ===
2020 New York State Senate election, District 56
Primary election
Party	Candidate	Votes	%
Democratic	Jeremy Cooney	11,136	53.9
Democratic	Hilda Rosario Escher	4,887	23.7
Democratic	Sherita Traywick	4,642	22.4
Write-in		10	0.0
Total votes		20,675	100.0
General election
Democratic	Jeremy Cooney	64,491	
Working Families	Jeremy Cooney	5,460	
Total	Jeremy Cooney	69,951	55.7
Republican	Michael Barry Jr.	46,137	
Conservative	Michael Barry Jr.	7,572	
Independence	Michael Barry Jr.	1,646	
Total	Michael Barry Jr.	55,355	44.1
Write-in		214	0.2
Total votes		125,520	100.0
Democratic gain from Republican			

=== 2018 ===
2018 New York State Senate election, District 56
Party	Candidate	Votes	%
Republican	Joseph Robach	43,152	
Conservative	Joseph Robach	7,200	
Independence	Joseph Robach	2,310	
Reform	Joseph Robach	429	
Total	Joseph Robach (incumbent)	53,091	55.5
Democratic	Jeremy Cooney	40,214	
Working Families	Jeremy Cooney	1,452	
Women's Equality	Jeremy Cooney	831	
Total	Jeremy Cooney	42,497	44.5
Write-in		27	0.0
Total votes		95,615	100.0
Republican hold			

=== 2016 ===
2016 New York State Senate election, District 56
Party	Candidate	Votes	%
Republican	Joseph Robach	58,190	
Conservative	Joseph Robach	9,405	
Independence	Joseph Robach	5,350	
Reform	Joseph Robach	629	
Total	Joseph Robach (incumbent)	73,574	63.2
Democratic	Ann Lewis	39,680	
Working Families	Ann Lewis	3,084	
Total	Ann Lewis	42,764	36.7
Write-in		57	0.1
Total votes		116,395	100.0
Republican hold			

=== 2014 ===
2014 New York State Senate election, District 56
Party	Candidate	Votes	%
Republican	Joseph Robach	36,330	
Conservative	Joseph Robach	8,115	
Independence	Joseph Robach	7,370	
Total	Joseph Robach (incumbent)	51,815	99.1
Write-in		454	0.9
Total votes		52,269	100.0
Republican hold			

=== 2012 ===
2012 New York State Senate election, District 56
Party	Candidate	Votes	%
Republican	Joseph Robach	57,687	
Independence	Joseph Robach	11,233	
Conservative	Joseph Robach	10,652	
Total	Joseph Robach (incumbent)	79,572	99.3
Write-in		549	0.7
Total votes		80,121	100.0
Republican hold			

=== Federal results in District 56 ===
Year	Office	Results
2020	President	Biden 57.1 – 40.5%
2016	President	Clinton 54.1 – 41.1%
2012	President	Obama 60.0 – 38.4%
2012	Senate	Gillibrand 67.9 – 30.5%
