= Robert Duffy =

Robert, Rob, Bob, or Bobby Duffy may refer to:

- Robert Duffy (politician) (born 1954), Lieutenant Governor of New York
- Robert Duffy (footballer) (born 1982), Welsh footballer
- Robert Duffy (American football) (1903–1974), Dickinson College football coach (1927–28)
- Bob Duffy (basketball, born 1922) (1922–1978), American basketball player in the BAA
- Bob Duffy (basketball, born 1940) (1940–2026), American basketball player in the NBA
- Bobby Duffy (died 1992), Irish soccer player
- Robert Duffy (businessman) (born 1954), American businessman
- Robert Duffy (programmer) (born 1963), American video game programmer
