= Bill Nojay =

American politician (1956–2016)

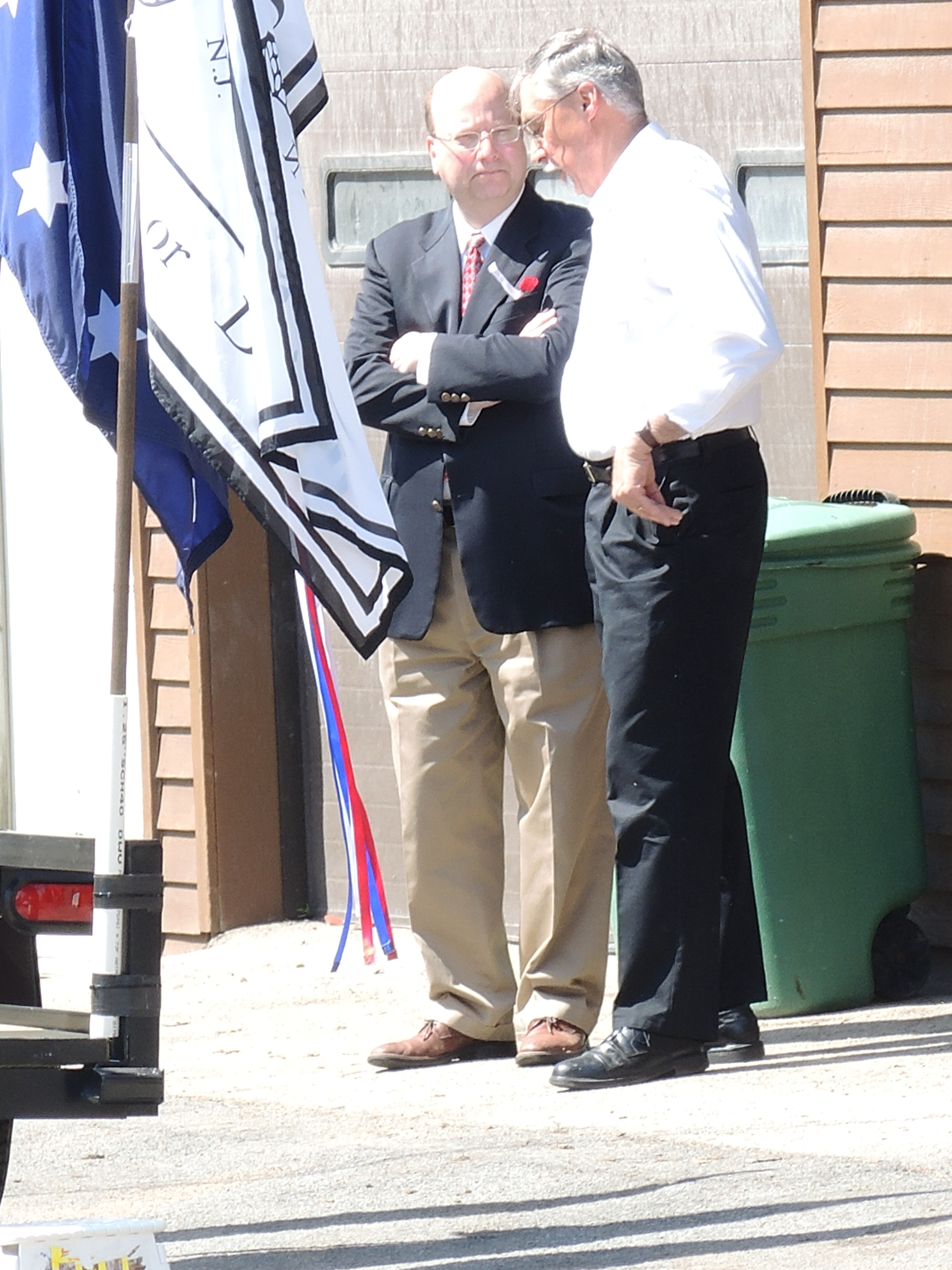

Member of the New York State Assembly from the 133rd district
- In office January 1, 2013 – September 9, 2016
- Preceded by: David Gantt
- Succeeded by: Joseph Errigo

Personal details
- Born: William Nogaj; November 24, 1956 Rochester, New York, U.S.
- Died: September 9, 2016 (aged 59) Rochester, New York, U.S.
- Cause of death: Suicide by gunshot
- Party: Republican
- Children: 3
- Education: Colgate University (BA); Columbia University (JD, MBA)
- Profession: Politician, attorney

William R. Nojay (born Nogaj; November 24, 1956 – September 9, 2016) was an American Republican politician and member of the New York State Assembly. Nojay represented the 133rd Assembly District, which included parts of Steuben and Monroe Counties and all of Livingston County, from 2013 to 2016.

== Early life and education ==
Nojay was born and raised in Rochester, New York, where his father worked at Eastman Kodak. His surname was originally "Nogaj", but he changed the spelling to match the pronunciation. He earned a bachelor's degree from Colgate University and graduated from Columbia University with degrees from its law school and business school.

== Career ==
Nojay was a conservative talk radio host. He also worked at a brokerage firm.

In 1996, Nojay was appointed by Governor George Pataki as commissioner of the Rochester Genesee Regional Transportation Authority. He also served on the Executive Committee of the Genesee Transportation Council and as chairman of the Regional Trails Initiative Steering Committee for the Rochester region, and as chief operating officer of Detroit's transportation system under Mayor Dave Bing.

Nojay represented Brian Kolb in connection with a 2000 special election in which Kolb was first elected to the Assembly.

After redistricting, Nojay defeated Democratic Steuben County Legislator Randy Weaver in 2012 to win a vacant seat in the newly redrawn 133rd Assembly District. He was re-elected in 2014 without opposition.

Nojay was a Republican. A gun rights supporter, Nojay was an outspoken opponent of the 2013 New York gun control law known as the SAFE Act. He organized a 2013 pro-Second Amendment concert called Freedompalooza.

Nojay supported Donald Trump's 2016 presidential campaign, and he served as co-chair of its New York campaign committee. He had asked Trump to run for governor of New York.

== Personal life and death ==
A resident of Pittsford, New York, Nojay was married and had three children.

On September 9, 2016, Nojay died from suicide by firearm near his family's plot at Riverside Cemetery in Rochester, New York. He was due in court that day to face fraud charges related to his legal work, which were subsequently sealed.

At the time of his death, Nojay was running for re-election to the Assembly. On September 14, 2016, he posthumously defeated Richard Milne, his challenger in the Republican Assembly primary. A Republican party committee selected former Assemblyman Joseph Errigo to replace Nojay in the general election, which Errigo won.

== Assembly committees ==
- Committee on Cities
- Committee on Consumer Affairs and Protection
- Committee on Election Law
- Committee on Tourism, Parks, Arts and Sports Development
- Committee on Transportation

New York State Assembly
| Preceded by David F. Gantt | New York State Assembly, 133rd District; January 1, 2013 – September 9, 2016 | Vacant |
