= Joseph Errigo =

American politician (1938–2020)

Joe Errigo

Member of the New York Assembly from the 133rd District
- In office December 6, 2016 – December 31, 2018
- Preceded by: Bill Nojay
- Succeeded by: Marjorie Byrnes
- In office January 3, 2001 – December 31, 2010
- Preceded by: Jerry Johnson
- Succeeded by: Sean T. Hanna

Personal details
- Born: November 30, 1938 Rochester, New York, US
- Died: April 27, 2020 (aged 81) New York, U.S.
- Party: Republican
- Spouse: Kathy Errigo
- Children: 3

Military service
- Branch/service: United States Marine Corps Reserves

Joseph A. Errigo (November 30, 1938 – April 27, 2020) was an American politician who represented New York's 133rd Assembly District in the New York State Assembly from 2001 to 2010 and 2016 to 2018.

== Early life and education ==
Errigo was born in Rochester, New York in 1938 and graduated from the Aquinas Institute in 1956. He served in the United States Marine Corps Reserve.

== Career ==
Errigo then worked as a draftsman for the New York State Department of Transportation. From 1965 to 1995, Errigo worked as a court reporter. He then established his own business, the Tiro Reporter Service, in 1978. He started a second business, Errigo Sand & Gravel, in 1995.

Errigo was elected as the representative for the 136th Assembly District in 2000. After redistricting, he represented the 130th Assembly District. He was a Republican. He did not seek re-election in 2010.

On September 14, 2016, Errigo was selected by a New York Republican State Committee to replace Bill Nojay on the general election ballot for the 133rd Assembly District. Nojay, the incumbent, had committed suicide several days before the primary election while under investigation for fraud. In the general election campaign, Errigo defeated Democratic candidate Barbara Baer.

In 2018, Errigo was defeated in a Republican primary, 61%-39%, by Marjorie Byrnes. Byrnes went on to defeat Democrat Barbara Baer in the general election.

On October 10, 2018, Errigo was charged with fraud and other crimes.

== Death ==
Errigo died on April 27, 2020, from complications of a fall suffered earlier in the year. He was 81. He had been in hospice care for dementia.
