= New York's 102nd State Assembly district =

American legislative district

Assemblymember
Christopher Tague; R–Schoharie

New York's 102nd State Assembly district is one of the 150 districts in the New York State Assembly. It has been represented by Schoharie County Republican Party chairman Christopher Tague since 2018.

== Geography ==
=== 2020s ===
District 102 contains all of Schoharie and Greene counties, and portions of Albany, Delaware, and Otsego counties. It includes the towns of Berne, Cooperstown, Cobleskill, Durham, Davenport, Hamden, Hunter and Walton.

The district overlaps partially with New York's 19th, 20th and 21st congressional districts, as well as the 41st, 46th and 51st districts of the New York State Senate.

==== 2020-2022 ====
District 102 contained all of Schoharie and Greene counties, and portions of Albany, Delaware, Otsego and Ulster counties. It includes the towns of Berne, Cooperstown, Cobleskill, Durham, Davenport, Hamden, Hunter and Walton.

=== 2010s ===
District 102 contains all of Schoharie and Greene counties, and portions of Albany, Columbia, Delaware, Otsego and Ulster counties.

== Recent election results ==
=== 2026 ===
2026 New York State Assembly election, District 102
Primary election
Party	Candidate	Votes	%
Democratic	Janet Tweed	2,571	46.2
Democratic	Thomas Boomhower	1,563	28.1
Democratic	Mary Finneran	1,425	25.6
Write-in		6	0.1
Total votes		5,565	100.0
General election
Republican	Marc Molinaro		
Democratic	Janet Tweed		
Working Families	Mary Finneran		
Write-in			
Total votes			

=== 2024 ===
2024 New York State Assembly election, District 102
Primary election
Party	Candidate	Votes	%
Democratic	Janet Tweed	1,808	50.8
Democratic	Mary Finneran	1,731	48.7
Write-in		19	0.5
Total votes		3,558	100.0
General election
Republican	Christopher Tague	40,353	
Conservative	Christopher Tague	5,685	
Total	Christopher Tague (incumbent)	46,038	63.5
Democratic	Janet Tweed	23,432	
Working Families	Janet Tweed	2,991	
Total	Janet Tweed	26,423	36.4
Write-in		36	0.1
Total votes		72,497	100.0
Republican hold			

=== 2022 ===
2022 New York State Assembly election, District 102
Party	Candidate	Votes	%
Republican	Christopher Tague	32,233	
Conservative	Christopher Tague	5,644	
Total	Christopher Tague (incumbent)	37,877	65.3
Democratic	Nicholas Chase	20,137	34.7
Write-in		17	0.0
Total votes		58,031	100.0
Republican hold			

=== 2020 ===
2020 New York State Assembly election, District 102
Party	Candidate	Votes	%
Republican	Christopher Tague	36,471	
Conservative	Christopher Tague	4,461	
Independence	Christopher Tague	1,384	
Total	Christopher Tague (incumbent)	42,316	63.5
Democratic	Betsy Kraat	24,277	36.5
Write-in		24	0.0
Total votes		66,637	100.0
Republican hold			

=== 2018 ===
2018 New York State Assembly election, District 102
Party	Candidate	Votes	%
Republican	Christopher Tague	24,761	
Conservative	Christopher Tague	4,289	
Independence	Christopher Tague	858	
Reform	Christopher Tague	221	
Total	Christopher Tague (incumbent)	30,129	56.3
Democratic	Aidan O'Connor Jr.	21,058	
Working Families	Aidan O'Connor Jr.	1,698	
Women's Equality	Aidan O'Connor Jr.	676	
Total	Aidan O'Connor Jr.	23,432	43.7
Write-in		11	0.0
Total votes		53,572	100.0
Republican hold			

=== 2018 special ===
Then-incumbent Peter Lopez was appointed as a regional administrator for the Environmental Protection Agency, triggering a special election. In special elections for state legislative offices, primaries are usually not held - county committee members for each party select nominees.

2018 New York State Assembly special election, District 102
Party	Candidate	Votes	%
Republican	Christopher Tague	6,913	
Conservative	Christopher Tague	1,665	
Independence	Christopher Tague	487	
Reform	Christopher Tague	91	
Total	Christopher Tague	9,156	45.6
Democratic	Aidan O'Connor Jr.	7,772	
Working Families	Aidan O'Connor Jr.	872	
Women's Equality	Aidan O'Connor Jr.	353	
Total	Aidan O'Connor Jr.	8,997	44.8
Best Choice	Wesley Laraway	1,914	9.5
Write-in		11	0.1
Total votes		20,078	100.0
Republican hold			

=== 2016 ===
2016 New York State Assembly election, District 102
Party	Candidate	Votes	%
Republican	Peter Lopez	35,075	
Conservative	Peter Lopez	5,569	
Independence	Peter Lopez	4,840	
Reform	Peter Lopez	496	
Total	Peter Lopez (incumbent)	45,980	99.4
Write-in		276	0.6
Total votes		46,256	100.0
Republican hold			

=== 2014 ===
2014 New York State Assembly election, District 102
Party	Candidate	Votes	%
Republican	Peter Lopez	23,862	
Conservative	Peter Lopez	5,460	
Independence	Peter Lopez	4,201	
Total	Peter Lopez (incumbent)	33,523	99.6
Write-in		149	0.4
Total votes		33,672	100.0
Republican hold			

=== 2012 ===
2012 New York State Assembly election, District 102
Party	Candidate	Votes	%
Republican	Peter Lopez	28,303	
Conservative	Peter Lopez	4,146	
Independence	Peter Lopez	2,843	
Total	Peter Lopez (incumbent)	35,292	65.6
Democratic	James Miller	18,522	34.4
Write-in		17	0.0
Total votes		53,831	100.0
Republican hold			
