= List of power stations in New York =

2025 New York utility-scale electricity generation in gigawatt-hours, by source:
1. Natural gas: 62,216 (47.0%)
2. Nuclear: 28,408 (21.5%)
3. Hydroelectric: 25,838 (19.5%)
4. Wind: 6,902 (5.22%)
5. Solar: 5,240 (3.96%)
6. Biomass: 1,487 (1.12%)
7. Petroleum: 1,282 (0.97%)
8. Other: 938 (0.71%)

This is a list of electricity-generating power stations in the U.S. state of New York, sorted by type and name.

In 2024, New York had a total summer capacity of 41.3 GW through all of its power plants, and a net generation of 129,015 GWh. In 2025, the electrical energy generation mix was 47% natural gas, 21.5% nuclear, 19.5% hydroelectric, 5.2% wind, 4% solar, 1.1% biomass, 1% petroleum, and 0.7% other. Small-scale solar including customer-owned photovoltaic panels delivered an additional net 5,119 GWh to New York's electricity grid in 2025. This was about three percent less than the amount generated by the state's utility-scale photovoltaic plants.

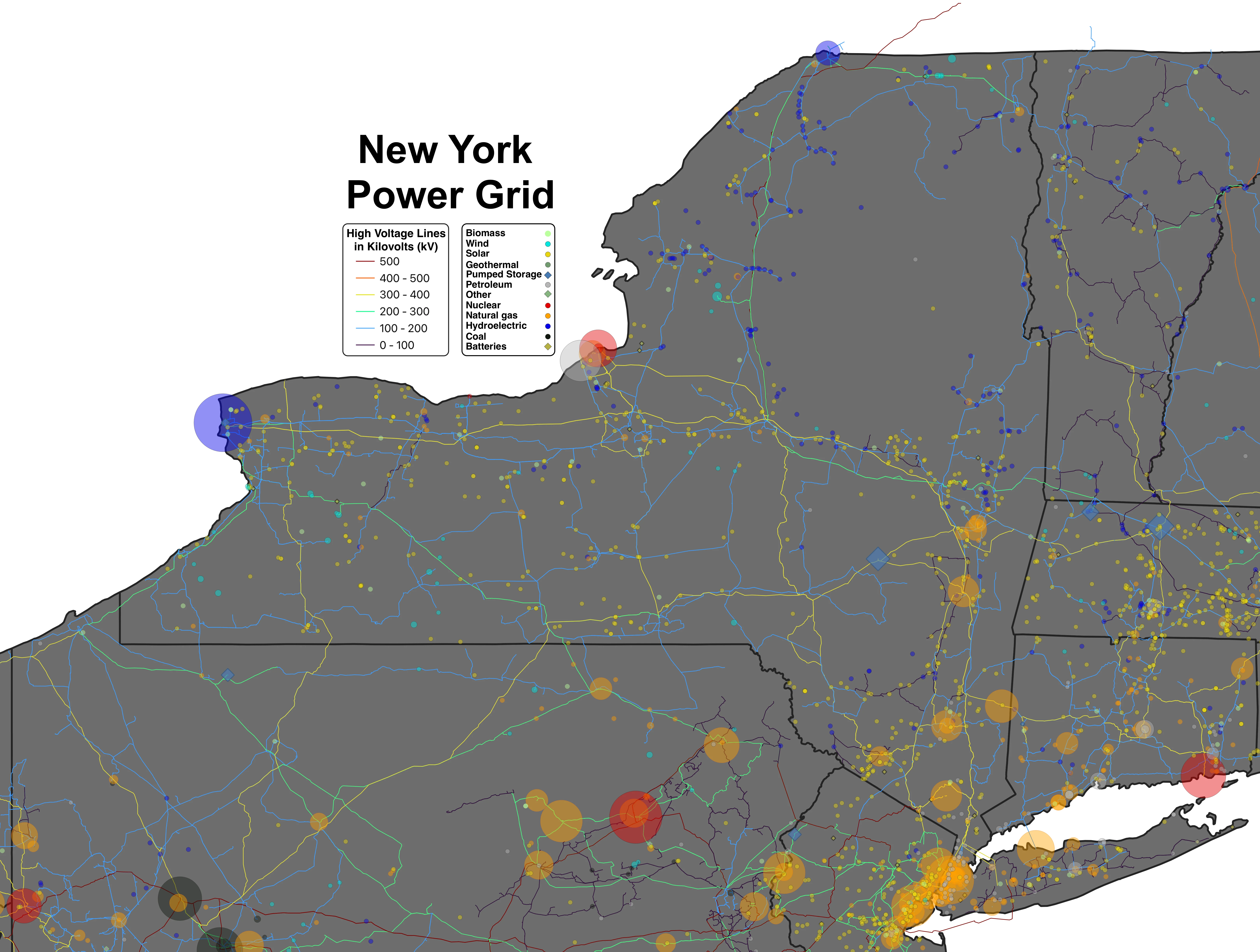
New York power grid

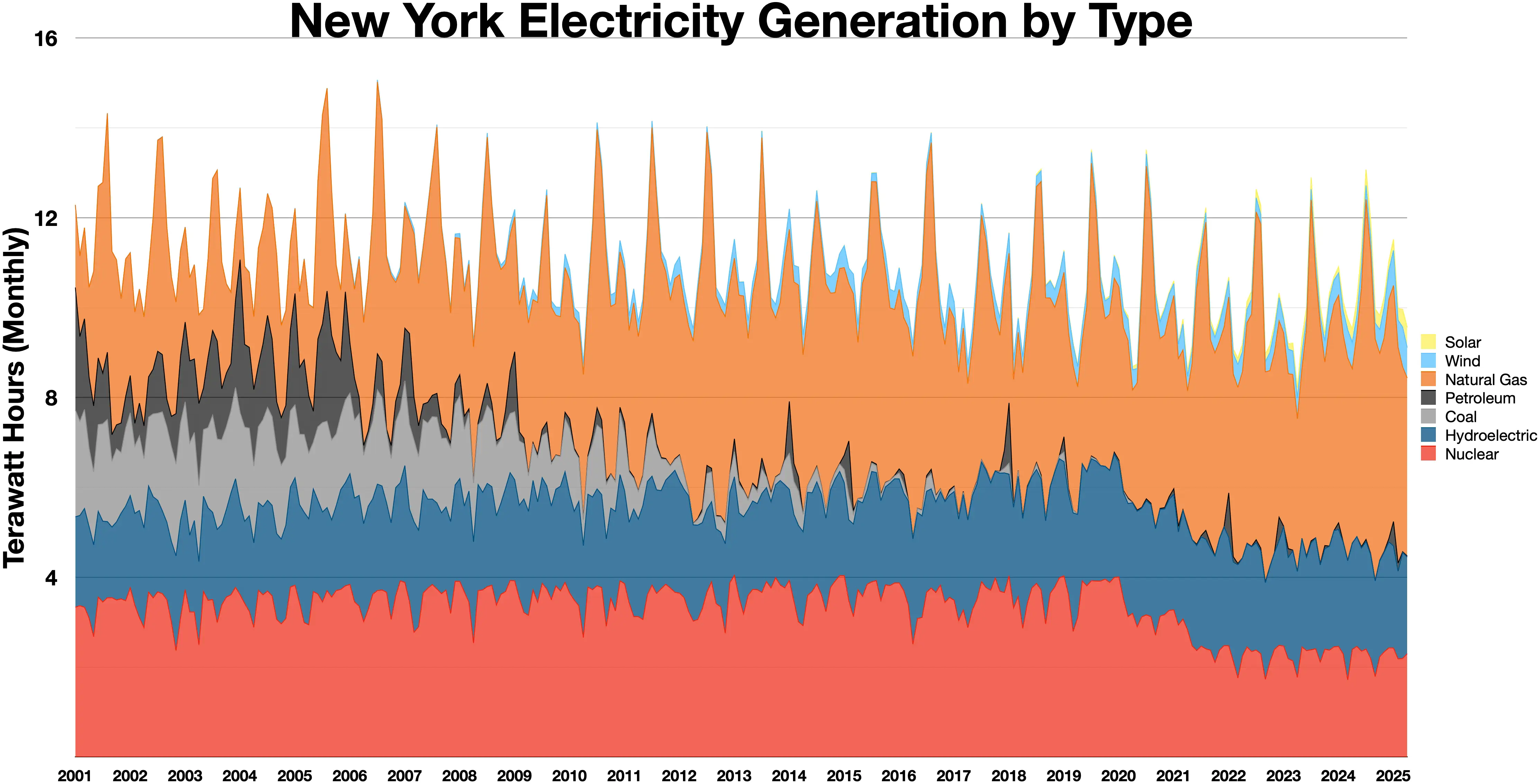
New York electricity generation by type

== List of resources ==
The following is a list of existing generation resources contained in the NYISO's 2018 Gold Book, grouped by station location.

Owner, operator, or billing organization	Plant name	Town or city	In-service date	Summer capability (MW)	Winter capability (MW)	Unit type	Primary fuel	Secondary fuel	2017 net energy (GWh)	Notes
Albany Energy LLC	Albany Landfill GE	Albany	1998-05-01	5.6	5.6	Internal combustion	Methane		26.4	
Astoria Energy II, LLC	Astoria Energy 2 - CC3 and CC4	Queens	2011-07-01	572	658.8	Combined cycle	Natural gas	Fuel oil (No. 2)	2568.8	
Astoria Energy, LLC	Astoria East Energy - CC1 and CC2	Queens	2006-04-01	581.8	656.8	Combined cycle	Natural gas	Fuel oil (No. 2)	3251.8	
Astoria Generating Company L.P.	Astoria 2, 3, 5, and GT 01	Queens	1967-07-01	942	951.8	Steam turbine and gas turbine	Fuel oil (no. 6)	Natural gas	780.3	In-service date is the date of latest unit to go in-service. The steam turbines generate most of the electricity with FO No. 6 as primary fuel; the GT uses NG as primary.
Astoria Generating Company L.P.	Gowanus 1–1 to 4-8	Brooklyn	1971-07-01	556.8	730.9	Gas turbine	Fuel oil (No. 2)	Natural gas	6.9	In-service date is the date of the latest unit to go in-service; Units 2–1 to 3-8 have NG as backup fuel.
Astoria Generating Company L.P.	Narrows 1–1 to 2-8	Brooklyn	1972-06-01	289.4	379.6	Gas turbine	Fuel oil (No. 2)	Natural gas	24.2	In-service date is the date of the latest unit to go in-service.
Bayonne Energy Center, LLC	Bayonne EC CTG1 to CTG8	Bayonne, NJ	2012-06-01	458.2	501.8	Jet engine	Natural gas	Kerosene	625.7	
Binghamton BOP, LLC	Binghamton	Binghamton	2001-03-01	0	0	Combined cycle	Natural gas	Kerosene	3.8	Retired on 1/9/2018
Black River Hydroelectric, LLC	Glen Park Hydro	Glen Park	1986-01-01	32.6	32.6	Hydro	Water		187.7	
Boralex Hydro Operations Inc	Fourth Branch	Waterford	1987-12-01	3.3	3.3	Hydro	Water		12.0	
Boralex Hydro Operations Inc	NYS Dam	Waterford	1990-12-01	11.4	11.4	Hydro	Water		59.0	
Boralex Hydro Operations Inc	Sissonville	Potsdam	1990-08-01	3.1	3.1	Hydro	Water		18.2	
Boralex Hydro Operations Inc	Warrensburg	Warrensburg	1988-12-01	2.9	2.9	Hydro	Water		12.4	
Calpine Energy Services LP	Bethpage and GT4	Hicksville	2002-07-01	96.3	107.9	Combined cycle and a SS gas turbine	Natural gas		436.5	In-service date is the date of the latest unit to go in-service.
Calpine Energy Services LP	KIAC_JFK_GT1 and GT2	Jamaica	1995-02-01	118.1	118.4	Combined cycle	Natural gas	Fuel oil (No. 2)	578.9	
Calpine Energy Services LP	Stony Brook	Stony Brook	1995-04-01	9.6	9.6	Gas turbine	Natural gas	Fuel oil (No. 2)	86.0	Behind-the-meter net generation resource
Canandaigua Power Partners, LLC	Canandaigua Wind Power	Avoca	2008-12-05	125.0	125.0	Wind turbine	Wind		264.6	
Canastota Windpower LLC	Fenner Wind Power	Fenner	2001-12-01	0	0	Wind turbine	Wind		44.4	Nameplate rating is 30 MW.
Carr Street Generating Station LP	Carr St.-E. Syr	Dewitt	1993-08-01	92.7	106.1	Combined cycle	Natural gas	Fuel oil (No. 2)	86.0	
Castleton Power, LLC	Castleton Energy Center	Castleton	1992-01-01	69.6	76.9	Combined cycle	Natural gas	Fuel oil (No. 2)	158.1	
Central Hudson Gas & Electric Corp.	Coxsackie GT	Coxsackie	1969-12-01	19.6	23.6	Gas turbine	Kerosene	Natural gas	0.4	
Central Hudson Gas & Electric Corp.	Dashville 1 and 2	Rifton	1920-01-01	0	0	Hydro	Water		0	Nameplate of both total to 4.8 MW.
Central Hudson Gas & Electric Corp.	Dutchess County Resource Recovery Agency	Poughkeepsie	1987-09-01	6.9	7.0	Steam turbine	Refuse		34.1	
Central Hudson Gas & Electric Corp.	High Falls	Marbletown	1986-12-01	0	0	Hydro	Water		0	Nameplate of unit is 3.2 MW.
Central Hudson Gas & Electric Corp.	Millpond	Catskill	1993-12-01	0	0	Hydro	Water		0	Nameplate of unit is 0.9 MW.
Central Hudson Gas & Electric Corp.	Montgomery West	Montgomery	1985-11-01	0	0	Hydro	Water		0	Nameplate of unit is 0.2 MW.
Central Hudson Gas & Electric Corp.	Salisbury Mills	Salisbury Mills	1986-12-01	0	0	Hydro	Water		0	Nameplate of unit is 0.5 MW.
Central Hudson Gas & Electric Corp.	South Cairo	Cairo	1970-06-01	20.1	23.3	Gas turbine	Kerosene		0.1	
Central Hudson Gas & Electric Corp.	Sturgeon 1, 2, and 3	Rifton	1924-01-01	0	0	Hydro	Water		0	Nameplate of units 1 to 3 are 14.4 MW.
Central Hudson Gas & Electric Corp.	Wallkill	Shwangunk	1986-12-01	0	0	Hydro	Water		0	Nameplate of unit is 0.5 MW.
Central Hudson Gas & Electric Corp.	Wappingers Falls	Wappingers Falls	1988-12-01	2	2	Hydro	Water		6.9	
CHI Energy Inc	Goodyear Lake	Milford	1980-07-01	0	0	Hydro	Water		5.0	Nameplate of unit is 1.4 MW.
Consolidated Edison Co. of NY, Inc.	59 St. GT 1	Manhattan	1969-06-01	15.4	22.2	Gas turbine	Kerosene	Natural gas	0.1	
Consolidated Edison Co. of NY, Inc.	74 St. GT 1 and 2	Manhattan	1968-10-01	37.9	41.5	Gas turbine	Kerosene		0.5	
Consolidated Edison Co. of NY, Inc.	Brooklyn Navy Yard	Brooklyn	1996-11-01	266.3	311.8	Combined cycle	Natural gas	Fuel oil (No. 2)	1904.1	
Consolidated Edison Co. of NY, Inc.	East River 1, 2, 6, and 7	Manhattan	2005-04-05	638	736	Combined cycle and SS steam cycles	Natural gas	Kerosene and fuel oil (No. 6)	3092.5	In-service date is the date of the latest unit to go in-service. Units 1 and 2 use kerosene as a backup fuel; Units 6 and 7 use FO No. 6 as a backup fuel.
Consolidated Edison Co. of NY, Inc.	Hudson Ave 3, 4, and 5	Brooklyn	1970-07-01	44.2	51.6	Gas turbine	Kerosene		2.1	
Consolidated Edison Co. of NY, Inc.	Broome 2 LFGE	Binghamton	2013-01-31	2	2	Internal combustion	Methane		17.7	
Consolidated Edison Energy, Inc.	Fortistar - N.Tonawanda	North Tonawanda	1993-06-01	59.1	69.2	Combined cycle	Natural gas	Fuel oil (No. 2)	11.2	
Consolidated Edison Energy, Inc.	Massena	Massena	1992-07-01	81.1	92.3	Combined cycle	Natural gas	Fuel oil (No. 2)	5.0	
Consolidated Edison Energy, Inc.	Munnsville Wind Power	Bouckville	2007-08-20	34.5	34.5	Wind turbine	Wind		96.7	
Consolidated Edison Energy, Inc.	Rensselaer	Rensselaer	1993-12-01	77.0	82.7	Combined cycle	Natural gas	Fuel oil (No. 2)	6.1	
Consolidated Edison Energy, Inc.	Roseton 1 and 2	Newburgh	1974-09-01	1211.8	1215.7	Steam turbine	Fuel oil (No. 6)	Natural gas	316.4	
Consolidated Hydro New York, Inc.	Groveville Hydro	Beacon	1983-12-01	0	0	Hydro	Water		0	Nameplate of unit is 0.9 MW.
Consolidated Hydro New York, Inc.	Walden Hydro	Walden	1983-12-01	0	0	Hydro	Water		3.9	Nameplate of unit is 2.4 MW.
Reworld Niagara, LP	American Re-Fuel 1 and 2	Niagara	1993-05-01	31.8	30.4	Steam turbine	Refuse		216.0	
Danskammer Energy, LLC	Danskammer 1 to 4	Newburgh 41°34′22″N 73°57′53″W	1967-09-01	495.2	494.9	Steam turbine	Natural gas	Fuel oil (No. 6)	9.0	In-service date is the date of the latest unit to go in-service; Units 3 and 4 have no backup fuel.
Dynegy Marketing and Trade, LLC	Independence	Scriba	1994-11-01	1002.0	1212.0	Combined cycle	Natural gas		4298.0	
Eagle Creek Hydro Power, LLC	Mongaup 1 to 4	Forestburg	1926-01-01	4.0	4.0	Hydro	Water		9.4	In-service date is the date of the latest unit to go in-service.
Eagle Creek Hydro Power, LLC	Rio	Glen Spey	1927-12-01	10.7	10.8	Hydro	Water		24.6	
Eagle Creek Hydro Power, LLC	Swinging Bridge 2	Forestburg	1930-02-01	7.0	7.1	Hydro	Water		10.2	
East Coast Power, LLC	Linden Cogen	Linden, New Jersey	1992-05-01	796.7	826.4	Combined cycle	Natural gas	Butane	3968.0	
Emera Energy Services, Inc	Lockport	Lockport	1992-07-01	208.0	232.1	Combined cycle	Natural gas	Fuel oil (No. 2)	147.6	
Emera Energy U.S. Subsidiary No. 1, Inc.	Greenidge 4	Torrey 42°40′46″N 76°56′54″W	1953-12-01	104.3	104.0	Steam turbine	Natural gas	Wood	165.2	Previously retired in 2011. Unit was reactivated on 5-1-2017.
Empire Generating Co, LLC	EMPIRE_CC_1 and 2	Rensselaer	2010-09-02	597.2	670.9	Combined cycle	Natural gas	Fuel oil (No. 2)	2357.3	
ENGIE Energy Marketing NA, Inc.	Nassau Energy Corp.	Garden City	1991-03-01	48.2	57.4	Combined cycle	Natural gas	Fuel oil (No. 2)	334.2	
Entergy Nuclear Power Marketing LLC	Indian Point 2 and 3	Buchanan 41.269745°N 73.952333°W	1976-04-01	2056.3	2063.9	Steam (pressurized water reactor)	Uranium		15304.4	In-service date is the date of the latest unit to go in-service.
Erie Blvd. Hydro - Beaver River	Belfort 1, 2, and 3	Belfort	1918-01-01	2.0	2.0	Hydro	Water		12.8	In-service date is the date of the latest unit to go in-service.
Erie Blvd. Hydro - Beaver River	Eagle 1, 2, 3, and 4	Watson	1925-01-01	6.2	6.2	Hydro	Water		37.8	In-service date is the date of the latest unit to go in-service.
Erie Blvd. Hydro - Beaver River	Effley 1, 2, 3, and 4	Belfort	1923-01-01	3.0	3.0	Hydro	Water		19.1	In-service date is the date of the latest unit to go in-service.
Erie Blvd. Hydro - Beaver River	Elmer 1 and 2	Belfort	1916-01-01	1.6	1.6	Hydro	Water		13.2	
Erie Blvd. Hydro - Beaver River	High Falls 1, 2, and 3	Indian River	1925-01-01	4.8	4.8	Hydro	Water		34.9	
Erie Blvd. Hydro - Beaver River	Moshier 1 and 2	Belfort	1929-01-01	8.0	8.0	Hydro	Water		46.9	
Erie Blvd. Hydro - Beaver River	Soft Maple 1 and 2	Croghan	1925-01-01	15.0	15.0	Hydro	Water		51.0	
Erie Blvd. Hydro - Beaver River	Taylorville 1, 2, 3, and 4	Belfort	1927-01-01	4.5	4.5	Hydro	Water		22.5	In-service date is the date of the latest unit to go in-service.
Erie Blvd. Hydro - Black River	Beebee Island 1 and 2	Watertown	1968-01-01	8.0	8.0	Hydro	Water		52.7	In-service date is the date of the latest unit to go in-service.
Erie Blvd. Hydro - Black River	Black River 1, 2, and 3	Black River	1920-01-01	6.0	6.0	Hydro	Water		38.0	
Erie Blvd. Hydro - Black River	Deferiet 1, 2, and 3	Deferiet	1925-01-01	10.8	10.8	Hydro	Water		68.4	
Erie Blvd. Hydro - Black River	Herrings 1, 2, and 3	Herrings	1924-01-01	5.4	5.4	Hydro	Water		23.4	
Erie Blvd. Hydro - Black River	Kamargo 1, 2, and 3	Black River	1921-01-01	5.4	5.4	Hydro	Water		24.5	
Erie Blvd. Hydro - Black River	Sewalls 1 and 2	Watertown	1925-01-01	2.0	2.0	Hydro	Water		14.1	
Erie Blvd. Hydro - East Canada Capital	Beardslee 1 and 2	Little Falls	1924-01-01	20.0	20.0	Hydro	Water		60.2	
Erie Blvd. Hydro - East Canada Capital	Ephratah 1, 2, 3, and 4	Caroga Lake	1920-01-01	3.9	3.9	Hydro	Water		7.6	In-service date is date of the last unit to go in-service; Unit 3's nameplate rating is 1.3 MW although its summer and winter capacities are listed as 0 MW.
Erie Blvd. Hydro - East Canada Mohawk	Inghams 1 and 2	Little Falls	1912-01-01	6.4	6.4	Hydro	Water		30.0	
Erie Blvd. Hydro - Lower Hudson	Johnsonville 1 and 2	Johnsonville	1909-01-01	2.4	2.4	Hydro	Water		6.7	
Erie Blvd. Hydro - Lower Hudson	Schaghticoke 1, 2, 3, and 4	Schaghticoke	1908-01-01	13.2	13.2	Hydro	Water		52.6	
Erie Blvd. Hydro - Lower Hudson	School Street 1 to 5	Cohoes	1974-01-01	38.8	38.8	Hydro	Water		164.5	In-service date is date of the last unit to go in-service.
Erie Blvd. Hydro - Lower Hudson	Schuylerville	Schuylerville	1919-01-01	1.2	1.2	Hydro	Water		6.7	
Erie Blvd. Hydro - Lower Raquette	Colton 1, 2, and 3	Colton	1962-01-01	30.0	30.0	Hydro	Water		225.7	In-service date is date of the last unit to go in-service.
Erie Blvd. Hydro - Lower Raquette	East Norfolk	East Norfolk	1928-01-01	3.0	3.5	Hydro	Water		10.8	
Erie Blvd. Hydro - Lower Raquette	Hannawa Falls 1 and 2	Hannawa Falls	1920-01-01	7.2	7.2	Hydro	Water		56.2	In-service date is date of the last unit to go in-service.
Erie Blvd. Hydro - Lower Raquette	Higley 1 to 4	Colton	1943-01-01	6.6	6.6	Hydro	Water		42.2	In-service date is date of last unit to go in-service.
Erie Blvd. Hydro - Lower Raquette	Norfolk	Norfolk	1928-01-01	4.5	4.5	Hydro	Water		29.9	
Erie Blvd. Hydro - Lower Raquette	Norwood	Norwood	1928-01-01	2.0	2.0	Hydro	Water		14.3	
Erie Blvd. Hydro - Lower Raquette	Raymondville	Raymondville	1928-01-01	2.0	2.0	Hydro	Water		13.0	
Erie Blvd. Hydro - Lower Raquette	Sugar Island 1 and 2	Potsdam	1924-01-01	5.0	5.0	Hydro	Water		31.9	
Erie Blvd. Hydro - Lower Raquette	Yaleville 1 and 2	Norwood	1940-01-01	1.2	0.7	Hydro	Water		3.0	
Erie Blvd. Hydro - North Salmon	Allens Falls	Allens Falls	1927-01-01	4.4	4.4	Hydro	Water		17.3	
Erie Blvd. Hydro - North Salmon	Chasm 1, 2, and 3	Chateaugay	1926-01-01	3.4	3.4	Hydro	Water		21.1	In-service date is date of last unit to go in-service.
Erie Blvd. Hydro - North Salmon	Franklin 1 and 2	Franklin	1926-01-01	2.2	2.2	Hydro	Water		12.5	In-service date is date of last unit to go in-service.
Erie Blvd. Hydro - North Salmon	Macomb	Malone	1940-01-01	1.0	1.0	Hydro	Water		6.3	
Erie Blvd. Hydro - North Salmon	Parishville	Parishville	1925-01-01	2.4	2.4	Hydro	Water		17.6	
Erie Blvd. Hydro - North Salmon	Piercefield 1, 2, and 3	Piercefield	1957-01-01	2.7	2.7	Hydro	Water		19.1	In-service date is date of last unit to go in-service.
Erie Blvd. Hydro - NYS Barge	Hydraulic Race	Lockport	1942-01-01	4.7	4.7	Hydro	Water		9.3	
Erie Blvd. Hydro - Oak Orchard	Glenwood 1, 2, and 3	Medina	1950-01-01	1.5	1.5	Hydro	Water		9.3	
Erie Blvd. Hydro - Oak Orchard	Oak Orchard	Waterport	1941-01-01	0.4	0.4	Hydro	Water		0	
Erie Blvd. Hydro - Oak Orchard	Waterport 1 and 2	Waterport	1968-01-01	4.8	4.8	Hydro	Water		18.7	In-service date is date of last unit to go in-service.
Erie Blvd. Hydro - Oswegatchie	Browns Falls 1 and 2	Oswegatchie	1923-01-01	15.0	15.0	Hydro	Water		70.9	
Erie Blvd. Hydro - Oswegatchie	Eel Weir 1, 2, and 3	Heuvelton	1938-01-01	2.7	2.7	Hydro	Water		10.6	In-service date is date of last unit to go in-service.
Erie Blvd. Hydro - Oswegatchie	Flat Rock 1 and 2	Flat Rock	1924-01-01	6.0	6.0	Hydro	Water		24.2	
Erie Blvd. Hydro - Oswegatchie	Heuvelton 1 and 2	Heuvelton	1924-01-01	1.0	1.0	Hydro	Water		4.0	
Erie Blvd. Hydro - Oswegatchie	Lower Newton Falls 1	Newton Falls	2002-07-01	0.5	0.5	Hydro	Water		3.6	
Erie Blvd. Hydro - Oswegatchie	Oswegatchie 1 and 2	Oswegatchie	1937-01-01	0.8	0.8	Hydro	Water		11.2	
Erie Blvd. Hydro - Oswegatchie	South Edwards 1 to 4	South Edwards	1937-01-01	2.9	2.9	Hydro	Water		25.1	In-service date is date of last unit to go in-service.
Erie Blvd. Hydro - Oswegatchie	Talville 1 and 2	Edwards	1986-12-01	1.0	1.0	Hydro	Water		5.9	
Erie Blvd. Hydro - Oswegatchie	Upper Newton Falls 2, 3, and 4	Newton Falls	2002-07-01	1.5	1.5	Hydro	Water		9.7	
Erie Blvd. Hydro - Seneca Oswego	Baldwinsville 1 and 2	Baldwinsville	1927-01-01	0.6	0.6	Hydro	Water	3.0		
Erie Blvd. Hydro - Seneca Oswego	Fulton 1 and 2	Fulton	1928-01-01	1.3	1.3	Hydro	Water		0	In-service date is date of last unit to go in-service; units reactivated February 1, 2018.
Erie Blvd. Hydro - Seneca Oswego	Granby 1 and 2	Granby	1983-05-01	10.4	10.4	Hydro	Water		52.0	
Erie Blvd. Hydro - Seneca Oswego	Minetto 2 to 6	Minetto	1975-01-01	8.5	8.5	Hydro	Water		38.0	In-service date is date of last unit to go in-service.
Erie Blvd. Hydro - Seneca Oswego	Oswego Falls E 1, E 2, E 3, W 4, W 5, W 6, and W 7	Oswego	2007-01-01	7.6	7.6	Hydro	Water		40.2	In-service date is date of last unit to go in-service.
Erie Blvd. Hydro - Seneca Oswego	Varick 2, 3, 4, and 5	Oswego	1926-01-01	9.2	9.2	Hydro	Water		30.1	
Erie Blvd. Hydro - South Salmon	Bennetts Bridge 1, 2, 3, and 4	Altmar	1970-01-01	26.8	26.8	Hydro	Water		114.0	In-service date is date of last unit to go in-service.
Erie Blvd. Hydro - South Salmon	Lighthouse Hill 1 and 2	Altmar	1930-01-01	7.6	7.6	Hydro	Water		29.3	
Erie Blvd. Hydro - Upper Hudson	E J West 1 and 2	Hadley	1930-01-01	20.0	20.0	Hydro	Water		77.7	
Erie Blvd. Hydro - Upper Hudson	Feeder Dam 1 to 5	South Glens Falls	1924-01-01	6.0	6.0	Hydro	Water		29.7	
Erie Blvd. Hydro - Upper Hudson	Sherman Island 1 to 6	Queensbury	2009-02-02	30.3	30.3	Hydro	Water		206.2	In-service date is date of last unit to go in-service. Unit 1 has nameplate of 8 MW but a sum and win capability of 0MW listed. Unit 6 has a nameplate of 1.3 MW but has a sum and win capability of 0 MW listed.
Erie Blvd. Hydro - Upper Hudson	Spier Falls 1 and 2	Moreau	1930-01-01	44.4	44.4	Hydro	Water		263.2	In-service date is date of last unit to go in-service.
Erie Blvd. Hydro - Upper Hudson	Stewarts Bridge 1 and 2	Hadley	2013-06-01	30.0	30.0	Hydro	Water		158.8	In-service date is date of last unit to go in-service. Unit 2 has a nameplate of 2.5 MW but a sum and win capability of 0 MW.
Erie Blvd. Hydro - Upper Raquette	Blake	Stark	1957-01-01	14.4	14.4	Hydro	Water		75.9	
Erie Blvd. Hydro - Upper Raquette	Five Falls	Colton	1955-01-01	22.5	22.5	Hydro	Water		118.0	
Erie Blvd. Hydro - Upper Raquette	Rainbow Falls	Colton	1956-01-01	22.5	22.5	Hydro	Water		125.9	
Erie Blvd. Hydro - Upper Raquette	South Colton	South Colton	1954-01-01	19.4	19.4	Hydro	Water		104.2	
Erie Blvd. Hydro - Upper Raquette	Stark	Stark	1957-01-01	22.5	22.5	Hydro	Water		116.9	
Erie Blvd. Hydro - West Canada	Prospect	Prospect	1959-01-01	17.3	17.3	Hydro	Water		88.1	
Erie Blvd. Hydro - West Canada	Trenton Falls 5, 6, and 7	Trenton	1922-01-01	19.6	19.6	Hydro	Water		149.1	In-service date is date of last unit to go in-service.
Erie Blvd. Hydropower LP	West Delaware Hydro	Grahamsville	1988-12-01	7.5	7.5	Hydro	Water		28.9	
Erie Wind, LLC	Erie Wind	Lackawanna	2012-02-01	0	0	Wind turbine	Wind		36.8	Nameplate is 15.0 MW even though summer and winter capability is listed as 0 MW.
Exelon Generation Company, LLC	Chaffee	Chaffee	2007-08-09	6.4	6.4	Internal combustion	Methane		50.7	
Exelon Generation Company, LLC	High Acres 1 and 2	Fairport	2008-02-28	9.6	9.6	Internal combustion	Methane		72.5	In-service date is date of last unit to go in-service.
Constellation Generation	James A. FitzPatrick	Scriba 43°31.4′N 76°23.9′W	1975-07-01	848.1	850.3	Steam (boiling water reactor)	Uranium		6174.3	
Exelon Generation Company, LLC	Madison County Landfill	Wampsville	2010-03-01	1.6	1.6	Internal combustion	Methane		5.4	
Exelon Generation Company, LLC	Mill Seat	Riga	2007-07-20	6.4	6.4	Internal combustion	Methane		52.5	
Exelon Generation Company, LLC	Monroe Livingston	Scottsville	1988-11-01	2.4	2.4	Internal combustion	Methane		7.6	
Exelon Generation Company, LLC	Oneida-Herkimer Landfill GE	Boonville	2012-04-01	3.2	3.2	Internal combustion	Methane		25.7	
Exelon Generation Company, LLC	Synergy Biogas	Wyoming	2012-09-01	0	0	Internal combustion	Methane		5.0	Nameplate of unit is 2 MW although sum and win capacity is listed as 0 MW.
Flat Rock Windpower II, LLC	Maple Ridge Wind 2	Lowville	2007-12-01	90.8	90.8	Wind turbine	Wind		218.6	
Flat Rock Windpower, LLC	Maple Ridge Wind 1	Lowville 43.75°N 75.55°W	2006-01-01	231.0	231.0	Wind turbine	Wind		570.5	
Freeport Electric	Freeport 1–2, 1–3, 1–4, 2–3, and CT 2	Freeport	2004-03-01	69.7	80.1	Gas turbine and internal combustion	Natural gas, kerosene, and fuel oil (No. 2)		39.4	In-service date is date of last unit to go in-service. Almost all of energy generated by CT 2, a gas turbine fueled with natural gas with a backup fuel of kerosene.
GenOn Energy Management, LLC	Bowline 1 and 2	West Haverstraw	1974-05-01	1130.7	1137.1	Steam turbine	Natural gas	Fuel oil (No. 6)	1206.3	In-service date is date of last unit to go in-service.
Hardscrabble Wind Power LLC	Hardscrabble Wind	Fairfield	2011-02-01	74.0	74.0	Wind turbine	Wind		177.6	
Helix Ravenswood, LLC	Ravenswood 01, 09, 10, 11, 2–1, 2-2, 2–3, 2–4, 3–1, 3–2, 3–4, CC 04, ST 01, ST 02, and ST 03	Queens 40°45′35″N 73°56′45″W	2004-05-01	2192.7	2335.6	Steam turbine, combined cycle, and jet engine	Fuel oil (No. 6), natural gas, kerosene	Natural gas, fuel oil (No. 2), kerosene	3000.2	In-service date is date of last unit to go in-service. The three steam turbines generate the most energy, burning FO no. 6 with ng as a backup fuel. The CC unit generates the next greatest amount, burning primarily natural gas with FO No. 2 as a backup.
Howard Wind LLC	Howard Wind	Howard	2011-12-01	55.4	55.4	Wind turbine	Wind		133.9	
Indeck Energy Services of Silver Springs	Indeck-Silver Springs	Silver Springs	1991-04-01	49.1	62.5	Combined cycle	Natural gas	Fuel oil (No. 2)	54.6	
Indeck-Corinth LP	Indeck-Corinth	Corinth	1995-07-01	130.6	134.7	Combined cycle	Natural gas	Fuel oil (No. 2)	665.3	
Indeck-Olean LP	Indeck-Olean	Olean	1993-12-01	78.7	87.8	Combined cycle	Natural gas	Fuel oil (No. 2)	83.1	
Indeck-Oswego LP	Indeck-Oswego	Oswego	1990-05-01	48.9	61.4	Combined cycle	Natural gas	Fuel oil (No. 2)	55.8	
Indeck-Yerkes LP	Indeck-Yerkes	Tonawanda	1990-02-01	47.7	56.7	Combined cycle	Natural gas	Fuel oil (No. 2)	48.8	
Innovative Energy Systems, Inc.	Auburn Landfill Gas	Auburn	2010-01-01	0	0	Internal combustion	Methane		0	Nameplate was 2.1 MW. Retired March 16, 2017.
Innovative Energy Systems, Inc.	Chautauqua Landfill GE	Jamestown	2010-02-12	0	0	Internal combustion	Methane		42.6	Nameplate is 9.6 MW although sum and win capacity is listed as 0 MW.
Innovative Energy Systems, Inc.	Clinton Landfill GE	Morrisonville	2008-10-01	6.4	6.4	Internal combustion	Methane		30.8	
Innovative Energy Systems, Inc.	Colonie Landfill GTE	Colonie	2006-03-01	6.4	6.4	Internal combustion	Methane		35.2	
Innovative Energy Systems, Inc.	DANC Landfill GE	Watertown	2008-09-08	6.4	6.4	Internal combustion	Methane		29.7	
Innovative Energy Systems, Inc.	Fulton Landfill GE	Johnstown	2010-06-04	0	0	Internal combustion	Methane		12.6	Nameplate is 3.2 MW although sum and win capacity is listed as 0 MW.
Innovative Energy Systems, Inc.	Hyland Landfill GE	Angelica	2008-09-08	4.8	4.8	Internal combustion	Methane		38.1	
Innovative Energy Systems, Inc.	Steuben County Landfill	Bath	2012-08-01	3.2	3.2	Internal combustion	Methane		15.6	
Jamestown Board of Public Utilities	"Samuel A. Carlson Electric Generating Station" (Jamestown 5, 6, and 7)	Jamestown	2002-01-01	80.1	85.2	Gas turbine and steam turbine	Natural gas	Bituminous coal	155.8	In-service date is the date of the last unit to go in-service. The gas turbine generates the most electricity, and is only fueled by natural gas.
Jericho Rise Wind Farm LLC	Jericho Rise Wind Farm	Chateaugay	2016-12-01	77.7	77.7	Wind turbine	Wind		246.3	
Tenaska Power Services Co.	Freeport CT 1	Freeport	2004-06-01	46.2	46.4	Gas turbine	Natural gas	Fuel oil (No. 2)	85.7	
Long Island Power Authority	Babylon (Railroad)	Babylon	1989-04-01	14.8	14.7	Steam turbine	Refuse		114.8	
Long Island Power Authority	Barrett 03, 04, 05, 06, 08, 09, 10, 11, 12, GT 01, GT 02, ST 01, ST 02	Island Park	1971-06-01	668.8	731.6	Steam turbine, jet engine, and gas turbine	Natural gas	Fuel oil (No. 6), fuel oil (No. 2)	1357.7	In-service date is the date of the last unit to go in-service. The steam turbines generate the most electricity, burning natural gas primarily with FO No. 6 as backup fuel. The jet engines produce the second most electricity, burning natural gas with FO No. 2 as a backup; National Grid proposed repowering recently.
Long Island Power Authority	Bethpage 3	Hicksville	2005-05-01	77.9	77.1	Combined cycle	Natural gas		169.1	
Long Island Power Authority	Caithness_CC_1	Brookhaven	2009-08-01	315.6	367.2	Combined cycle	Natural gas	Fuel oil (No. 2)	2415.2	
Long Island Power Authority	East Hampton 2, 3, 4, and GT 01	East Hampton	1970-12-01	24.8	29.9	Jet engine and internal combustion	Fuel oil (No. 2)		7.6	In-service date is the date of the last unit to go in-service. The jet engines produce the most electricity.
Long Island Power Authority	Far Rockaway GT1	Far Rockaway	2002-07-01	53.5	58.4	Jet engine	Natural gas		99.6	
Long Island Power Authority	Far Rockaway GT2	Jamaica Bay	2003-07-02	54.5	54.3	Jet engine	Kerosene		7.4	
Long Island Power Authority	Glenwood GT 01, 02, 03, 04, and 05	Glenwood	2002-06-01	200.3	233.3	Gas turbine	Natural gas, fuel oil (No. 2)	Fuel oil (No. 2)	101.5	In-service date is the date of the last unit to go in-service. Units 1, 2, and 3 only burn FO no. 2 and rarely run.
Long Island Power Authority	Greenport GT1	Greenport	2003-07-02	53.5	55.3	Jet engine	Fuel oil (No. 2)		8.8	
Long Island Power Authority	Hempstead (Railroad)	Hempstead	1989-10-01	74.3	75.2	Steam turbine	Refuse		593.5	
Long Island Power Authority	Holtsville 01 to 10	Holtsville	1975-07-01	535.0	650.0	Jet engine	Fuel oil (No. 2)		13.3	In-service date is date of last unit to go in-service.
Long Island Power Authority	Huntington (Railroad)	Huntington	1991-12-01	24.3	24.3	Steam turbine	Refuse		193.9	
Long Island Power Authority	Islip (Railroad)	Ronkonkoma	1990-03-01	8.3	8.7	Steam turbine	Refuse		55.9	
Long Island Power Authority	Long Island Solar Farm	Upton	2011-11-01	31.5	31.5	Photovoltaic	Sun		47.3	
Long Island Power Authority	Northport 1, 2, 3, 4, and GT	Northport	1977-12-01	1587.4	1587.2	Steam turbine and gas turbine	Natural gas, fuel oil (No. 2)	Fuel oil (No. 6)	1627.4	In-service date is date of the last unit to go in-service. The gas turbine unit did not produce electricity in 2017. The steam turbines primarily burn natural gas.
Long Island Power Authority	Oceanside (Landfill)	Oceanside	1991-02-01	0	0	Internal combustion	Methane		0	Nameplate of unit is 2.1 MW although sum and win capability is listed as 0 MW.
Long Island Power Authority	Oyster Bay (Landfill)	Bethpage	1986-07-01	0	0	Internal combustion	Methane		0	Nameplate of unit is 1.3 MW although sum and win capability is listed as 0 MW.
Long Island Power Authority	Pilgrim GT1 and GT2	Brentwood	2002-08-01	90.4	93.1	Gas turbine	Natural gas		34.8	
Long Island Power Authority	Pinelawn Power 1	Babylon	2005-06-01	75.7	78.2	Combined cycle	Natural gas	Kerosene	126.1	
Long Island Power Authority	Port Jefferson 3, 4, GT 01, GT 02, and GT 03	Port Jefferson	2002-07-01	479.8	504.6	Steam turbine and gas turbine	Fuel oil (No. 6), natural gas, and fuel oil (No. 2)	Natural gas and fuel oil (No. 2)	241.3	In-service date is date of the last unit to go in-service. The steam turbines generate the most electricity, burning FO No. 6 with natural gas as a backup. The gas turbines burn natural gas with FO no. 2 as a backup.
Long Island Power Authority	South Hampton 1	South Hampton	1963-03-01	8.5	10.9	Gas turbine	Fuel oil (No. 2)		0.9	
Long Island Power Authority	Shoreham 1, 2, GT3, GT4	Shoreham	2002-08-01	156.3	182.5	Gas turbine and jet engine	Fuel oil (No. 2)		5.2	In-service date is date of last unit to go in-service. Most of the electricity is generated by the gas turbines.
Long Island Power Authority	Smithtown (Landfill)	Smithtown	1985-12-01	0	0	Internal combustion	Methane		0	Nameplate of unit is 1.1 MW although sum and win capacity is listed as 0 MW.
Long Island Power Authority	South Oaks Hospital	Amityville	1990-06-01	0	0	Internal combustion	Natural gas		0	Nameplate of unit is 1.0 MW although sum and win capacity is listed as 0 MW.
Long Island Power Authority	Southold 1	Southold	1964-08-01	10.2	12.7	Gas turbine	Fuel oil (No. 2)		0.1	
Long Island Power Authority	Wading River 1, 2, and 3	Shoreham	1989-08-01	232.0	301.9	Gas turbine	Fuel oil (No. 2)		5.7	
Long Island Power Authority	West Babylon 4	West Babylon	1971-08-01	50	66.9	Gas turbine	Fuel oil (No. 2)		0.7	
Long Island Power Authority	Yaphank (Landfill)	Yaphank	1983-09-01	0	0	Internal combustion	Methane		0	Nameplate of unit is 1.6 MW although sum and win capacity is listed as 0 MW.
Lyonsdale Biomass, LLC	Lyonsdale	Lyonsdale	1992-08-01	19.3	20.3	Steam turbine	Wood		97.7	
Madison Windpower, LLC	Madison Wind Power	Madison	2000-09-01	11.6	11.6	Wind turbine	Wind		20.8	
Marble River LLC	Marble River Wind	Ellenburg	2012-07-01	215.2	215.2	Wind turbine	Wind		542.2	
Marsh Hill Energy LLC	Marsh Hill Wind Farm	Jasper	2014-12-01	0	0	Wind turbine	Wind		48.8	Nameplate of farm is 16.2 MW although sum and win capacity is listed as 0 MW.
Model City Energy LLC	Model City Energy	Lewiston	2001-06-01	5.6	5.6	Internal combustion	Methane		39.6	
Modern Innovative Energy, LLC	Modern Landfill	Lewiston	2006-02-01	6.4	6.4	Internal combustion	Methane		21.4	
New Athens Generating Company, LLC	Athens 1, 2, and 3	Athens	2004-05-01	994.1	1202.8	Combined cycle	Natural gas	Fuel oil (No. 2)	3890.8	
New York Power Authority	Ashokan 1 and 2	Ashokan	1982-11-01	4.6	4.6	Hydro	Water		13.2	
New York Power Authority	Astoria CC 1 and 2	Queens	2006-01-01	468.4	520.0	Combined cycle	Natural gas	Fuel oil (No. 2)	2242.3	
New York Power Authority	Blenheim-Gilboa 1, 2, 3, and 4	Gilboa	1973-07-01	1168.6	1169.9	Pumped storage	Water		351.4	
New York Power Authority	Brentwood	Brentwood	2001-08-01	45.5	46.4	Gas turbine	Natural gas		50.2	
New York Power Authority	Crescent 1, 2, 3, and 4	Crescent	1991-07-01	11.6	11.6	Hydro	Water		66.5	
New York Power Authority	Richard M. Flynn	Holtsville	1994-05-01	137.7	162.7	Combined cycle	Natural gas	Fuel oil (No. 2)	969.3	
New York Power Authority	Gowanus 5 and 6	Brooklyn	2001-08-01	79.9	79.9	Gas turbine	Natural gas		89.8	
New York Power Authority	Grahamsville	Grahamsville	1956-12-01	18.0	18.0	Hydro	Water		87.4	
New York Power Authority	Greenport IC 4, 5, and 6	Greenport	1971-09-17	5.3	5.3	Internal combustion	Fuel oil (No. 2)		0	In-service date is date of last unit to go in-service.
New York Power Authority	Harlem River 1 and 2	Bronx	2001-08-01	79.9	79.9	Gas turbine	Natural gas		23.6	
New York Power Authority	Hellgate 1 and 2	Bronx	2001-08-01	79.9	79.9	Gas turbine	Natural Gas		28.9	
New York Power Authority	Jarvis 1 and 2	Hinckley	1991-07-01	9.0	9.0	Hydro	Water		37.1	
New York Power Authority	Kent	Brooklyn	2001-08-01	46.0	46.6	Gas turbine	Natural gas		39.0	
New York Power Authority	Lewiston Pumped Storage (Fleet)	Niagara Falls	1961-01-01	240.0	240.0	Pumped storage	Water		443.9	
New York Power Authority	Moses Niagara (Fleet)	Niagara Falls	1961-01-01	2435.0	2435.0	Hydro	Water		15785.7	
New York Power Authority	Neversink	Grahamsville	1953-12-01	25.0	25.0	Hydro	Water		27.4	
New York Power Authority	Pouch	Staten Island	2001-08-01	45.4	46.0	Gas turbine	Natural gas		45.9	
New York Power Authority	St. Lawrence-FDR (Fleet)	Massena	1958-07-01	856.0	827.0	Hydro	Water		7651.5	
New York Power Authority	Vernon Blvd 2 and 3	Queens	2001-08-01	79.9	79.9	Gas turbine	Natural gas		51.4	
New York Power Authority	Vischer Ferry 1, 2, 3, and 4	Vischer Ferry	1991-07-01	11.6	11.6	Hydro	Water		49.7	
New York State Electric & Gas Corp.	AA Dairy	Ithaca	1998-06-01	0	0	Internal combustion	Methane		0	Nameplate of unit is 0.1 although sum and win capability is listed as 0 MW.
New York State Electric & Gas Corp.	Alice Falls 1 and 2	Ausable	1991-11-01	0	0	Hydro	Water		0	Nameplate of units are 2.1 MW although sum and win capabilities are listed as 0 MW.
New York State Electric & Gas Corp.	Allegheny 8 and 9	Kittanning, PA	1990-10-01	38.0	38.0	Hydro	Water		192.7	
New York State Electric & Gas Corp.	Auburn-Mill St.	Auburn	1981-10-01	0	0	Hydro	Water		0	Nameplate of unit is 0.4 MW although sum and win capability is listed as 0 MW.
New York State Electric & Gas Corp.	Auburn-No. Div. St.	Auburn	1992-12-01	0	0	Hydro	Water		0	Nameplate of unit is 0.8 MW although sum and win capability is listed as 0 MW.
New York State Electric & Gas Corp.	Auburn-State St.	Auburn	1995-01-01	3.7	7.3	Gas turbine	Natural gas		0.1	
New York State Electric & Gas Corp.	Broom Landfill GE	Binghamton	2007-09-01	2.1	2.1	Internal combustion	Methane		9.6	
New York State Electric & Gas Corp.	Chasm Falls Hydro	Chateaugay	1982-03-01	0	0	Hydro	Water		0	Nameplate of unit is 1.6 MW although sum and win capability is listed as 0 MW.
New York State Electric & Gas Corp.	Croton Falls Hydro	North Salem	1987-01-01	0	0	Hydro	Water		0	Nameplate of unit is 0.2 MW although sum and win capability is listed as 0 MW.
New York State Electric & Gas Corp.	Harris Lake	Newcomb	1967-08-01	0	0	Internal combustion	Fuel oil (No. 2)		0	Nameplate of unit is 1.7 MW although sum and win capability is listed as 0 MW.
New York State Electric & Gas Corp.	Montville Falls	Moravia	1992-08-01	0	0	Hydro	Water		0	Nameplate of unit is 0.2 MW although sum and win capability is listed as 0 MW.
New York State Electric & Gas Corp.	Waterloo 2, 3, and 4	Waterloo	1998-06-01	0	0	Hydro	Water		0	Nameplate of units are 1.5 MW although sum and win capabilities are listed as 0 MW.
New York State Electric & Gas Corp.	Cadyville 1, 2, and 3	Schuyler Falls	1986-09-01	5.5	5.5	Hydro	Water		28.1	In-service date is date of last unit to go in-service.
New York State Electric & Gas Corp.	High Falls 1, 2, and 3	Saranac	1956-08-01	15.0	15.0	Hydro	Water		58.6	In-service date is date of last unit to go in-service.
New York State Electric & Gas Corp.	Kent Falls 1, 2, and 3	Schuyler Falls	1985-07-01	13.6	13.6	Hydro	Water		12.7	In-service date is date of last unit to go in-service.
New York State Electric & Gas Corp.	Mill C 1, 2, and 3	Plattsburgh	1984-11-01	6.0	6.0	Hydro	Water		31.7	In-service date is date of last unit to go in-service.
New York State Electric & Gas Corp.	Rainbow Falls 1 and 2	Ausable	1927-08-01	2.6	2.6	Hydro	Water		0	In-service date is date of last unit to go in-service.
New York State Electric & Gas Corp.	Mechanicville 1 and 2	Stillwater	1983-09-01	18.5	18.6	Hydro	Water		71.7	
New York State Electric & Gas Corp.	Lower Saranac 1, 2, and 3	Schuyler Falls	1990-10-01	0	0	Hydro	Water		0	Nameplate of units are 6.7 MW although sum and win capabilities are listed as 0 MW.
Niagara Mohawk Power Corp.	Boralex - Hudson Falls	Hudson Falls	1995-10-01	0	0	Hydro	Water		241.6	Nameplate of unit is 44.0 MW although sum and win capability is listed as 0 MW.
Niagara Mohawk Power Corp.	Boralex - South Glens Falls	Moreau	1994-12-01	0	0	Hydro	Water		83.7	Nameplate of unit is 13.8 MW although sum and win capability is listed as 0 MW.
Niagara Mohawk Power Corp.	CHI-LaChute	Ticonderoga	1987-12-01	0	0	Hydro	Water		30.9	Nameplate of unit is 9.0 MW although sum and win capability is listed as 0 MW.
Niagara Mohawk Power Corp.	Fortis - Dolgeville	Dolgeville	1985-07-01	0	0	Hydro	Water		0.1	Nameplate of unit is 5.0 MW although sum and win capability is listed as 0 MW.
Niagara Mohawk Power Corp.	Fortis Energy - Philadelphia	Philadelphia	1986-08-01	0	0	Hydro	Water		12.6	Nameplate of unit is 3.6 MW although sum and win capability is listed as 0 MW.
Niagara Mohawk Power Corp.	Fortis Energy - Moose River	Lyonsdale	1987-09-01	0	0	Hydro	Water		64.9	Nameplate of unit is 12.6 MW although sum and win capability is listed as 0 MW.
Niagara Mohawk Power Corp.	General Mills Inc	Buffalo	1988-12-01	0	0	Gas turbine	Natural gas		2.8	Nameplate of unit is 3.8 MW although sum and win capability is listed as 0 MW.
Niagara Mohawk Power Corp.	International Paper - Curtis and Palmer	Corinth	1986-01-01	0	0	Hydro	Water		371.5	Nameplate of units are 59.0 MW although sum and win capabilities are listed as 0 MW.
Niagara Mohawk Power Corp.	Little Falls Hydro	Little Falls	1987-01-01	0	0	Hydro	Water		62.1	Nameplate of unit is 13.0 MW although sum and win capability is listed as 0 MW.
Niagara Mohawk Power Corp.	Onondaga County	North Syracuse	1994-12-01	0	0	Steam turbine	Refuse		221.8	Nameplate of unit is 39.5 MW although sum and win capability is listed as 0 MW.
Niagara Mohawk Power Corp.	Pyrites Associates	Canton	1985-12-01	0	0	Hydro	Water		35.4	Nameplate of unit is 8.2 MW although sum and win capability is listed as 0 MW.
Niagara Mohawk Power Corp.	Adams Hydro	Adams	1987-11-01	0	0	Hydro	Water		0	Nameplate of unit is 0.2 MW although sum and win capability is listed as 0 MW.
Niagara Mohawk Power Corp.	Algon.-Herkimer	Herkimer	1987-12-01	0	0	Hydro	Water		0	Nameplate of unit is 1.6 MW although sum and win capability is listed as 0 MW.
Niagara Mohawk Power Corp.	Algon.-Otter Creek	Greig	1986-11-01	0	0	Hydro	Water		0.9	Nameplate of unit is 0.5 MW although sum and win capability is listed as 0 MW.
Niagara Mohawk Power Corp.	Allied Frozen Storage	Cheektowaga	2008-05-01	0	0	Internal combustion	Natural gas		0	Nameplate of unit is 0.1 MW although sum and win capability is listed as 0 MW.
Niagara Mohawk Power Corp.	Azure Mountain	St. Regis Falls	1993-08-01	0	0	Hydro	Water		2.8	Nameplate of unit is 0.6 MW although sum and win capability is listed as 0 MW.
Niagara Mohawk Power Corp.	Beaver Falls #1 and #2	Beaver Falls	1986-01-01	0	0	Hydro	Water		16.5	Nameplate of units are 2.5 MW although sum and win capabilities are listed as 0 MW.
Niagara Mohawk Power Corp.	Bellows Towers	Malone	1987-06-01	0	0	Hydro	Water		0	Nameplate of unit is 0.2 MW although sum and win capabilities are listed as 0 MW.
Niagara Mohawk Power Corp.	Black River Hydro #1 (Rock Island), #2 (Denley), and #3 (P. Leyden)	Port Leyden	1985-12-01	0	0	Hydro	Water		24.6	In-service date is date of last unit to go in-service. Nameplates of units are 5.7 MW although sum and win capabilities are listed as 0 MW.
Niagara Mohawk Power Corp.	Boralex - Middle Falls	Easton	1989-12-01	0	0	Hydro	Water		10.7	Nameplate of unit is 2.2 MW although sum and win capability is listed as 0 MW.
Niagara Mohawk Power Corp.	Burrstone EC, LLC LU and U	Utica	2009-11-01	0	0	Internal combustion	Natural gas		1.2	Nameplate of units are 3.3 MW although sum and win capabilities are listed as 0 MW.
Niagara Mohawk Power Corp.	Burt Dam Hydro	Burt	1987-12-01	0	0	Hydro	Water		1.8	Nameplate of unit is 0.6 MW although sum and win capability is listed as 0 MW.
Niagara Mohawk Power Corp.	C.H.I. (Dexter) Hydro	Dexter	1988-01-01	0	0	Hydro	Water		22.2	Nameplate of unit is 4.2 MW although sum and win capability is listed as 0 MW.
Niagara Mohawk Power Corp.	C.H.I. (Diamond Island)	Watertown	1986-01-01	0	0	Hydro	Water		7.1	Nameplate of unit is 1.2 MW although sum and win capability is listed as 0 MW.
Niagara Mohawk Power Corp.	C.H.I. (Fowler)	Fowler	1986-01-01	0	0	Hydro	Water		4.9	Nameplate of unit is 0.6 MW although sum and win capability is listed as 0 MW.
Niagara Mohawk Power Corp.	C.H.I. (Hallsboro #3, 4 and 6)	Hallsboro	1986-01-01	0	0	Hydro	Water		23.5	Nameplate of units are 3.0 MW although sum and win capabilities are listed as 0 MW.
Niagara Mohawk Power Corp.	C.H.I. (Theresa)	Theresa	1986-01-01	0	0	Hydro	Water		8.8	Nameplate of unit is 1.3 MW although sum and win capability is listed as 0 MW.
Niagara Mohawk Power Corp.	Cal Ban Power	Allegany	1995-06-01	0	0	Internal combustion	Natural gas		0	Nameplate is listed as 0.1 MW although sum and win capability is listed as 0 MW.
Niagara Mohawk Power Corp.	Cellu-Tissue Corp - Nat. Dam	Gouverneur	1986-01-01	0	0	Hydro	Water		0	Nameplate is listed as 1.0 MW although sum and win capability is listed as 0 MW.
Niagara Mohawk Power Corp.	Champlain Spinner	Whitehall	1992-07-01	0	0	Hydro	Water		1.4	Nameplate is listed as 0.4 MW although sum and win capability is listed as 0 MW.
Niagara Mohawk Power Corp.	Chittenden Falls	Stuyvesant	1995-12-01	0	0	Hydro	Water		0	Nameplate is listed as 0.6 MW although sum and win capability is listed as 0 MW.
Niagara Mohawk Power Corp.	Christine Falls Hydro	Wells	1987-12-01	0	0	Hydro	Water		3.3	Nameplate is listed as 0.9 MW although sum and win capability is listed as 0 MW.
Niagara Mohawk Power Corp.	City of Oswego (High Dam)	Oswego	1994-02-01	0	0	Hydro	Water		50.6	Nameplate is listed as 11.9 MW although sum and win capability is listed as 0 MW.
Niagara Mohawk Power Corp.	City of Utica - Sand Road and Trenton Falls	Utica	1993-05-01	0	0	Hydro	Water		1.9	In-service date is date of last unit to go in-service. Nameplates are listed as 0.4 MW although sum and win capabilities are listed as 0 MW.
Niagara Mohawk Power Corp.	City of Watertown	Watertown	1986-01-01	0	0	Hydro	Water		18.8	Nameplate of unit is 8.1 MW although sum and win capability is listed as 0 MW.
Niagara Mohawk Power Corp.	City of Watervliet Hydro	Guilderland	1986-01-01	0	0	Hydro	Water		3.0	Nameplate is listed as 1.5 MW although sum and win capability is listed as 0 MW.
Niagara Mohawk Power Corp.	Cons. HY-Victory	Victory Falls	1986-12-01	0	0	Hydro	Water		6.9	Nameplate is listed as 1.7 MW although sum and win capability is listed as 0 MW.
Niagara Mohawk Power Corp.	Copenhagen Associates	Copenhagen	1986-01-01	0	0	Hydro	Water		11.4	Nameplate is listed as 3.3 MW although sum and win capability is listed as 0 MW.
Niagara Mohawk Power Corp.	Cottrell Paper	Rock City Falls	1987-01-01	0	0	Hydro	Water		0	Nameplate is listed as 0.3 MW although sum and win capability is listed as 0 MW.
Niagara Mohawk Power Corp.	Cranberry Lake	Cranberry Lake	1987-12-01	0	0	Hydro	Water		2.1	Nameplate is listed as 0.5 MW although sum and win capability is listed as 0 MW.
Niagara Mohawk Power Corp.	Edison Hydro Electric	Stottville	2009-11-01	0	0	Hydro	Water		1.0	Nameplate is listed as 0.3 MW although sum and win capability is listed as 0 MW.
Niagara Mohawk Power Corp.	Empire Hydro Partners	Port Leyden	1984-11-01	0	0	Hydro	Water		4.7	Nameplate is listed as 1.0 MW although sum and win capability is listed as 0 MW.
Niagara Mohawk Power Corp.	Finch Paper LLC - Glens Falls and Finch Pruyn	Glens Falls	2009-11-01	0	0	Hydro	Water		0.3	Nameplates are listed as 40.8 MW although sum and win capabilities are listed as 0 MW.
Niagara Mohawk Power Corp.	Forestport Hydro	Forestport	1987-12-01	0	0	Hydro	Water		12.7	Nameplate is 3.4 MW although sum and win capability is listed as 0 MW.
Niagara Mohawk Power Corp.	Fort Miller Associates	Schuylerville	1985-10-01	0	0	Hydro	Water		27.4	Nameplate is 5.0 MW although sum and win capability is listed as 0 MW.
Niagara Mohawk Power Corp.	Fortis Energy - Diana	Diana	1985-07-01	0	0	Hydro	Water		7.7	Nameplate is 1.8 MW although sum and win capability is listed as 0 MW.
Niagara Mohawk Power Corp.	Franklin Hydro	Franklin Falls	1995-03-01	0	0	Hydro	Water		0	Nameplate is 0.3 MW although sum and win capability is listed as 0 MW.
Niagara Mohawk Power Corp.	Gloversville Johnstown WWT	Gloversville	2010-01-01	0	0	Internal combustion	Methane		1.4	Nameplate is 0.7 MW although sum and win capability is listed as 0 MW.
Niagara Mohawk Power Corp.	Green Island Power Authority	Green Island	1971-01-01	0	0	Hydro	Water		41.1	Nameplate is 6.0 MW although sum and win capability is listed as 0 MW.
Niagara Mohawk Power Corp.	Hewittville Hydro	Potsdam	1984-07-01	0	0	Hydro	Water		16.0	Nameplate is 3.0 MW although sum and win capability is listed as 0 MW.
Niagara Mohawk Power Corp.	Hollings&Vose-Center, Lower, and Upper	Easton	1986-01-01	0	0	Hydro	Water		0.6	Nameplates are listed as 1.2 MW although sum and win capabilities are listed as 0 MW.
Niagara Mohawk Power Corp.	Hollow Dam Power	Saint Lawrence	1987-12-01	0	0	Hydro	Water		3.4	Nameplate is 1.0 MW although sum and win capability is listed as 0 MW.
Niagara Mohawk Power Corp.	Hoosick Falls	Hoosick Falls	1988-08-01	0	0	Hydro	Water		0	Nameplate is 0.6 MW although sum and win capability is listed as 0 MW.
Niagara Mohawk Power Corp.	Hydrocarbon-Algny	Allegany	1992-12-01	0	0	Internal combustion	Natural gas		0	Nameplate is 0.2 MW although sum and win capability is listed as 0 MW.
Niagara Mohawk Power Corp.	Indian Falls HY	Theresa	1986-01-01	0	0	Hydro	Water		0	Nameplate is 0.3 although sum and win capability is listed as 0 MW.
Niagara Mohawk Power Corp.	Kayuta Lake	Kayuta	1988-05-01	0	0	Hydro	Water		2.0	Nameplate is 0.4 MW although sum and win capability is listed as 0 MW.
Niagara Mohawk Power Corp.	Kings Falls	Copenhagen	1988-05-01	0	0	Hydro	Water		0	Nameplate is 1.6 MW although sum and win capability is listed as 0 MW.
Niagara Mohawk Power Corp.	Laidlaw Energy	Ellicottville	1991-07-01	0	0	Gas turbine and steam turbine	Natural gas		0	Nameplates are listed as 5.8 MW although sum and win capabilities are listed as 0 MW.
Niagara Mohawk Power Corp.	Long Falls Hydro	Carthage	1991-06-01	0	0	Hydro	Water		13.5	Nameplate is 3.3 MW although sum and win capability is listed as 0 MW.
Niagara Mohawk Power Corp.	Lyonsdale Associates (Burrows)	Lyons Falls	1984-07-01	0	0	Hydro	Water		13.4	Nameplate is 3.0 MW although sum and win capability is listed as 0 MW.
Niagara Mohawk Power Corp.	Mechanicville	Halfmoon	2005-03-01	0	0	Hydro	Water		22.8	Nameplate is 3.8 MW although sum and win capability is listed as 0 MW.
Niagara Mohawk Power Corp.	Mount Ida Hydro	Troy	1986-01-01	0	0	Hydro	Water		8.7	Nameplate is 3.0 MW although sum and win capability is listed as 0 MW.
Niagara Mohawk Power Corp.	Mountainaire Massage Spa	Wevertown	2009-11-01	0	0	Hydro	Water		0	Nameplate is not listed.
Niagara Mohawk Power Corp.	Newport Hydro Associates	Newport	1987-12-01	0	0	Hydro	Water		8.1	Nameplate is 1.7 MW although sum and win capability is listed as 0 MW.
Niagara Mohawk Power Corp.	Northbrook Carthage	Carthage	1986-01-01	0	0	Hydro	Water		25.6	Nameplate is 4.4 MW although sum and win capability is listed as 0 MW.
Niagara Mohawk Power Corp.	Nottingham High School	Syracuse	1988-06-01	0	0	Cogeneration	Natural gas		0	Nameplate is 0.2 MW although sum and win capability is listed as 0 MW.
Niagara Mohawk Power Corp.	Oakvale Construction	Wilmington	2009-11-01	0	0	Hydro	Water		2.1	Nameplate is 0.4 MW although sum and win capability is listed as 0 MW.
Niagara Mohawk Power Corp.	Ogdensburg Hydro	Ogdensburg	1987-12-01	0	0	Hydro	Water		13.9	Nameplate is 3.5 MW although sum and win capability is listed as 0 MW.
Niagara Mohawk Power Corp.	Onondaga Energy Partners	Onondaga	1987-12-01	0	0	Internal combustion	Methane		0	Nameplate is 1.4 MW although sum and win capability is listed as 0 MW.
Niagara Mohawk Power Corp.	Oswego County	Oswego	1986-03-01	0	0	Steam turbine	Refuse		4.7	Nameplate is 3.6 MW although sum and win capability is listed as 0 MW.
Niagara Mohawk Power Corp.	Oswego Hydro Partners LP	Phoenix	1990-12-01	0	0	Hydro	Water		11.5	Nameplate is 3.4 MW although sum and win capability is listed as 0 MW.
Niagara Mohawk Power Corp.	Riverrat Glass & Electric	Wadhams	1986-01-01	0	0	Hydro	Water		1.9	Nameplate is 0.6 MW although sum and win capability is listed as 0 MW.
Niagara Mohawk Power Corp.	Sandy Hollow Hydro Assoc.	Sandy Hollow	1986-09-01	0	0	Hydro	Water		1.0	Nameplate is 0.6 MW although sum and win capability is listed as 0 MW.
Niagara Mohawk Power Corp.	Seneca Limited	Syracuse	1985-12-01	0	0	Hydro	Water		0	Nameplate is 0.2 MW although sum and win capability is listed as 0 MW.
Niagara Mohawk Power Corp.	St. Elizabeth Medical Center	Utica	2012-02-01	0	0	Internal combustion	Natural gas		0.1	Nameplate is 0.6 MW although sum and win capability is listed as 0 MW.
Niagara Mohawk Power Corp.	Stevens&Thompson Paper	Middle Falls	1987-12-01	0	0	Hydro	Water		28.5	Nameplate is 10.5 MW although sum and win capability is listed as 0 MW.
Niagara Mohawk Power Corp.	Stillwater Associates	Webb	1987-01-01	0	0	Hydro	Water		7.4	Nameplate is 1.8 MW although sum and win capability is listed as 0 MW.
Niagara Mohawk Power Corp.	Stillwater Hydro Partners LP	Stillwater	1993-04-01	0	0	Hydro	Water		15.3	Nameplate is 3.4 MW although sum and win capability is listed as 0 MW.
Niagara Mohawk Power Corp.	Stuyvesant Falls Hydro	Stuyvesant	2013-02-01	0	0	Hydro	Water		14.6	Nameplate is 7.0 MW although sum and win capability is listed as 0 MW.
Niagara Mohawk Power Corp.	Sustainable Bioelectric LLC	Wheatfield	2014-03-01	0	0	Internal combustion	Methane		0.8	Nameplate is 0.6 MW although sum and win capability is listed as 0 MW.
Niagara Mohawk Power Corp.	Synergics - Middle and Upper Greenwich	Greenwich	1987-12-01	0	0	Hydro	Water		0	Nameplate is 0.6 MW although sum and win capability is listed as 0 MW.
Niagara Mohawk Power Corp.	Synergics - Union Falls	Union Falls	1987-12-01	0	0	Hydro	Water		8.5	Nameplate is 3.0 MW although sum and win capability is listed as 0 MW.
Niagara Mohawk Power Corp.	Tannery Island	Carthage	1986-01-01	0	0	Hydro	Water		9.3	Nameplate is 1.5 MW although sum and win capability is listed as 0 MW.
Niagara Mohawk Power Corp.	Town of Wells (Lake Algon.)	Wells	1987-12-01	0	0	Hydro	Water		1.8	Nameplate is 0.5 MW although sum and win capability is listed as 0 MW.
Niagara Mohawk Power Corp.	Tri-City JATC	Latham	2009-11-01	0	0	Internal combustion	Natural gas		0	Nameplate is not listed.
Niagara Mohawk Power Corp.	Unionville Hydro	Potsdam	1984-07-01	0	0	Hydro	Water		15.8	Nameplate is 3.0 MW although sum and win capability is listed as 0 MW.
Niagara Mohawk Power Corp.	United States Gypsum	Batavia	2009-11-01	0	0	Cogeneration	Natural gas		1.1	Nameplate is 5.8 MW although sum and win capability is listed as 0 MW.
Niagara Mohawk Power Corp.	Valatie Falls	Valatie	1992-12-01	0	0	Hydro	Water		0.5	Nameplate is 0.1 MW although sum and w in capability is listed as 0 MW.
Niagara Mohawk Power Corp.	Valley Falls Associates	Valley Falls	1985-08-01	0	0	Hydro	Water		9.0	Nameplate is 2.5 MW although sum and win capability is listed as 0 MW.
Niagara Mohawk Power Corp.	Village of Gouverneur	Gouverneur	1986-01-01	0	0	Hydro	Water		0	Nameplate is 0.1 MW although sum and win capability is listed as 0 MW.
Niagara Mohawk Power Corp.	Village of Potsdam (1?) and 2	Potsdam	2014-04-01	0	0	Hydro	Water		0	In-service date is date of last unit to go in-service. Nameplates are 1.3 MW although sum and win capabilities are listed as 0 MW.
Niagara Mohawk Power Corp.	Village of Saranac Lake	Saranac Lake	1996-12-01	0	0	Hydro	Water		0.6	Nameplate is 0.2 MW although sum and win capability is listed as 0 MW.
Niagara Mohawk Power Corp.	Wave Hydro LLC	Baldwinsville	2010-02-07	0	0	Hydro	Water		0.3	Nameplate is 0.8 MW although sum and win capability is listed as 0 MW.
Niagara Wind Power, LLC	Steel Wind	Lackawanna 42°48.8′N 78°52′W	2007-01-23	0	0	Wind turbine	Wind		51.8	Nameplate is 20.0 MW although sum and win capability is listed as 0 MW.
Constellation Generation	Nine Mile Point 1 and 2	Scriba 43°31′15″N 76°24′25″W	1988-08-01	1916.6	1929.9	Steam (boiling water reactor)	Uranium		16040.8	In-service date is date of last unit to go in-service.
Noble Altona Windpark, LLC	Altona Wind Power	Altona	2008-09-23	97.5	97.5	Wind turbine	Wind		175.6	
Noble Bliss Windpark, LLC	Bliss Wind Power	Bliss	2008-03-20	100.5	100.5	Wind turbine	Wind		210.4	
Noble Chateaugay Windpark, LLC	Chateaugay Wind Power	Chateaugay	2008-10-07	106.5	106.5	Wind turbine	Wind		208.5	
Noble Clinton Windpark 1, LLC	Clinton Wind Power	Clinton	2008-04-09	100.5	100.5	Wind turbine	Wind		170.9	
Noble Ellenburg Windpark, LLC	Ellenburg Wind Power	Ellenburg	2008-03-31	81.0	81.0	Wind turbine	Wind		173.2	
Noble Wethersfield Windpark, LLC	Wethersfield Wind Power	Wethersfield	2008-12-11	126.0	126.0	Wind turbine	Wind		272.1	
Northbrook Lyons Falls, LLC	Hampshire Paper	Gouverneur	1987-03-01	3.4	3.4	Hydro	Water		20.2	
Northbrook Lyons Falls, LLC	Lyons Falls Hydro	Lyons Falls	1986-01-01	8.0	8.0	Hydro	Water		46.0	
NRG Power Marketing LLC	Arthur Kill GT 1, ST 2, and ST 3	Staten Island	1970-06-01	862.3	878.4	Steam turbine and gas turbine	Natural gas		827.1	In-service date is date of last unit to go in-service. The steam turbines generate most of the electricity.
NRG Power Marketing LLC	Astoria GT 2–1, 2-2, 2–3, 2–4, 3–1, 3–2, 3-3, 3–4, 4–1, 4–2, 4–3, and 4-4	Queens	1970-07-01	415.3	537.9	Jet engine	Kerosene	Natural gas	29.4	In-service date is date of last unit to go in-service.
NRG Power Marketing LLC	Oswego 5, 6, IC 1, IC 2, and IC 3	Oswego	1980-07-01	1638.0	1654.2	Steam turbine and internal combustion	Fuel oil (No. 6) and fuel oil (No. 2)	Natural gas	39.7	In-service date is date of last unit to go in-service. The two steam turbine units generate all the electricity and primarily burn FO No. 6; natural gas is only a backup fuel for steam turbine unit 6.
Orange and Rockland Utilities	Buttermilk Falls	Highland Falls	1986-12-01	0	0	Hydro	Water		0	Nameplate is 0.1 MW although sum and win capability is listed as 0 MW.
Orange and Rockland Utilities	Intl. Crossroads	Mahwah, New Jersey	1987-12-01	0	0	Internal combustion	Natural gas	Fuel oil (No. 2)	0	Nameplate is 3.0 MW although sum and win capability is listed as 0 MW.
Orange and Rockland Utilities	Middletown Landfill G and Landfill G.Part 19	Goshen	1988-12-01	0	0	Internal combustion	Methane		0	Nameplates are listed as 5.5 MW although sum and win capabilities are listed as 0 MW.
PSEG Energy Resource & Trade, LLC	Bethlehem Energy Center	Bethlehem	2005-07-01	787.2	862.5	Combined cycle	Natural gas	Fuel oil (No. 2)	5303.7	
Constellation Generation	R. E. Ginna	Ontario 43.277893°N 77.310104°W	1970-07-01	580.6	581.1	Steam (pressurized water reactor)	Uranium		4655.2	
ReEnergy Black River LLC	Fort Drum	Watertown	2013-05-30	0	0	Steam turbine	Wood	Fuel oil (No. 2)	190.7	Nameplate is 55.5 MW although sum and win capability is listed as 0 MW; converted from coal in 2013.
Rochester Gas and Electric Corp.	Mills Mills	Filmore	1906-07-01	0	0	Hydro	Water		0	Nameplate is 0.2 MW although sum and win capability is listed as 0 MW.
Rochester Gas and Electric Corp.	Mount Morris	Mount Morris	1916-07-01	0	0	Hydro	Water		0	Nameplate is 0.3 MW although sum and win capability is listed as 0 MW.
Rochester Gas and Electric Corp.	Station 2 1	Rochester	1913-07-01	8.5	8.5	Hydro	Water		28.7	
Rochester Gas and Electric Corp.	Station 26 1	Rochester	1952-08-01	3.0	3.0	Hydro	Water		5.9	
Rochester Gas and Electric Corp.	Station 5 1, 5 2, and 5 3	Rochester	1918-07-01	45.6	45.6	Hydro	Water		144.2	
Rockville Centre, Village of	Charles P Keller 07, 08, 09, 10, 11, 12, 13, and 14	Rockville Centre	1994-09-01	30.2	30.2	Internal combustion	Fuel oil (No. 2)	Natural gas	1.7	In-service date is date of last unit to go in-service.
SBF New York, LLC	Beaver Falls	Beaver Falls	1995-03-01	81.4	95.7	Combined cycle	Natural gas	Fuel oil (No. 2)	5.7	
SBF New York, LLC	Syracuse	Syracuse	1993-09-01	83.3	97.1	Combined cycle	Natural gas	Fuel oil (No. 2)	20.6	
Selkirk Cogen Partners, L.P.	Selkirk-I and Selkirk-II	Selkirk	1994-09-01	360.2	430.2	Combined cycle	Natural gas	Fuel oil (No. 2)	229.1	In-service date is date of last unit to go in-service.
Seneca Energy II, LLC	Ontario Landfill GE	Canandaigua	2003-12-01	11.2	11.2	Internal combustion	Methane		67.2	
Seneca Energy II, LLC	Seneca Energy 1 and 2	Seneca Falls	1997-08-01	17.6	17.6	Internal combustion	Methane		122.0	In-service date is date of last unit to go in-service.
Seneca Falls Power Corp.	Seneca Falls 1, 2, and 4	Seneca Falls	1998-06-01	0	0	Hydro	Water		0	Nameplate of units is 5.6 MW although sum and win capabilities are listed as 0 MW.
Seneca Power Partners, L.P.	Allegany	Hume	1995-03-01	62.5	62.0	Combined cycle	Natural gas		33.1	
Seneca Power Partners, L.P.	Batavia	Batavia	1992-06-01	48.8	59.6	Combined cycle	Natural gas		20.2	
Seneca Power Partners, L.P.	Carthage Energy	Carthage	1991-08-01	56.5	64.2	Combined cycle	Natural gas	Fuel oil (No. 2)	4.9	
Seneca Power Partners, L.P.	Hillburn GT	Hillburn	1971-04-01	35.1	44.9	Jet engine	Natural gas	Kerosene	0.4	
Seneca Power Partners, L.P.	Shoemaker GT	Middletown	1971-05-01	32.4	41.8	Jet engine	Natural gas	Kerosene	0.4	
Seneca Power Partners, L.P.	Sterling	Sherrill	1991-06-01	50.4	63.4	Combined cycle	Natural gas		12.9	
Sheldon Energy LLC	High Sheldon Wind Farm	Sheldon	2009-02-01	118.1	118.1	Wind turbine	Wind		268.4	
Stephentown Spindle LLC	Beacon LESR	Stephentown	2010-11-29	0	0	Energy storage	Flywheel		0	Nameplate is 20.0 MW although sum and win capability is listed as 0 MW. Only provides frequency regulation service.
Stony Creek Energy LLC	Orangeville Wind Farm	Orangeville	2013-12-01	93.9	93.9	Wind turbine	Wind		279.9	
TransAlta Energy Marketing (U.S.) Inc.	Saranac Energy	Plattsburgh	1994-06-01	246.1	271.3	Combined cycle	Natural gas		61.0	
Triton Power Company	Chateaugay High Falls	Chateaugay	1987-12-01	0	0	Hydro	Water		8.3	Nameplate is 1.7 MW although sum and win capability is listed as 0 MW.
Western New York Wind Corp.	Western New York Wind Power	Wethersfield	2000-10-01	0	0	Wind turbine	Wind		7.1	Nameplate is 6.6 MW although sum and win capability is listed as 0 MW.
Wheelabrator Hudson Falls, LLC	Wheelabrator Hudson Falls	Hudson Falls	1991-10-01	10.9	10.3	Steam turbine	Refuse		71.1	
Wheelabrator Westchester, LP	Wheelabrator Westchester	Peekskill	1984-04-01	52.6	51.1	Steam turbine	Refuse		394.3	

== Other plants ==
This is a list of plants not mentioned by name in the NYISO Gold Book.

Owner, operator, or billing organization	Plant name	Town or city	In-service date	Summer capability (MW)	Winter capability (MW)	Unit type	Primary fuel	Secondary fuel	2017 net energy (GWh)	Notes
Dutch Hill/Cohocton Wind Farm	Dutch Hill/Cohocton Wind Farm	Steuben County	?	125	125	Wind turbine	Wind		?	?
Kodak Park	Kodak Park	Rochester 43°11′52″N 77°39′54″W	?	132	132	?	Natural gas		?	Ended use of coal in March 2018, switched to natural gas

== Retired plants ==
This is a list of retired plants.

Owner, operator, or billing organization	Plant name	Town or city	In-service date	Summer capability (MW)	Winter capability (MW)	Unit type	Primary fuel	Secondary fuel	2017 net energy (GWh)	Notes
AES Eastern Energy, LP	Westover 8	Union 42°06′41″N 75°58′26″W	1951-12-01	0	0	Steam turbine	Bituminous coal			Retired in 2011
AES Hickling LLC	Hickling Power Station	Corning 42°07′21″N 76°58′57″W	?	70	70	Steam turbine	Bituminous coal			Retired in 2000
Binghamton BOP, LLC	Binghamton BOP	Binghamton		43.7	47.1					Retired in 2018
Cayuga Operating Company, LLC	Cayuga 1, 2, IC1, and IC2	Lansing 42°36′09″N 76°38′01″W	1967-08-01	239.5	309.2	Steam turbine and internal combustion	Bituminous coal	Fuel oil (No. 2)	220.2	Plant ceased production on 8.29.2019, and was officially retired in 10.2019.
Helix Ravenswood, LLC	Ravenswood 04, 05, and 06	Queens		41.0	49.3					Mothballed in 2016
NRG Power Marketing LLC	Astoria GT 05, GT 07, GT 08, GT 10, GT 11, GT 12, GT 13	Queens		104.7	136.6					Some mothballed and others forced outages in 2016
NRG Power Marketing LLC	Dunkirk Generating Station	Dunkirk 42°29′28″N 79°20′46″W	1950-12-01	505	505	Steam turbine	Bituminous coal			The last unit retired on January 1, 2016.
NRG Power Marketing LLC	Huntley Generating Station	Tonawanda 42°58′15″N 78°55′56″W	1958-12-01	816	816	Steam turbine	Bituminous coal			The last units retired in 2016.
Somerset Operating Company, LLC	Somerset	Somerset 43°21′29″N 78°36′14″W	1984-08-01	685.9	691.5	Steam turbine	Bituminous coal		347.3	Burned last coal on March 13, 2020, decommissioned on March 31, 2020
