= Pete Lopez (politician) =

American politician

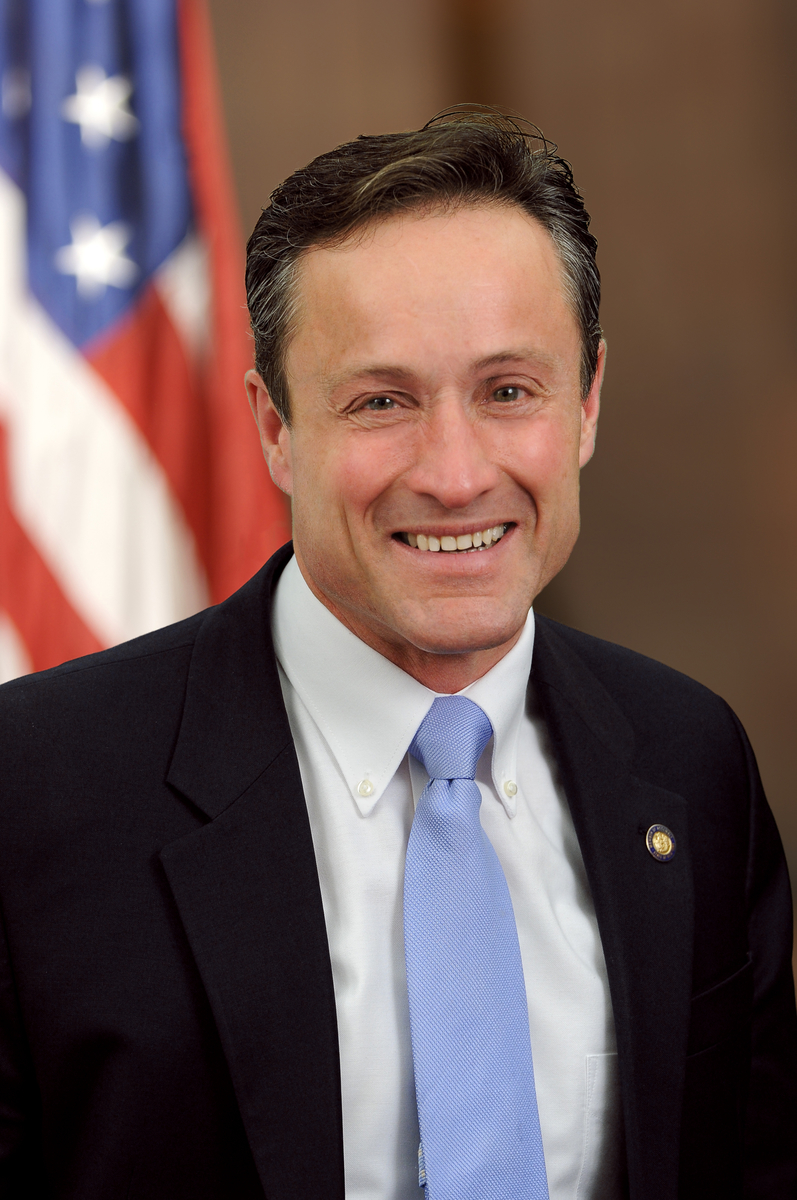

Region 2 Regional Administrator of the Environmental Protection Agency
- Incumbent
- Assumed office October 1, 2017
- President: Donald Trump
- Administrator: Andrew R. Wheeler
- Preceded by: Catherine McCabe (Acting)

Member of the New York State Assembly from the 102nd district
- In office January 1, 2013 – October 1, 2017
- Preceded by: Joel M. Miller
- Succeeded by: Chris Tague

Member of the New York State Assembly from the 127nd district
- In office January 1, 2007 – December 31, 2012
- Preceded by: Daniel L. Hooker
- Succeeded by: Albert A. Stirpe Jr.

Personal details
- Born: April 10, 1961 (age 65) Miami, Florida
- Party: Republican
- Spouse: Bridgett
- Children: four
- Education: SUNY Cobleskill; SUNY Albany (M.P.A.)
- Profession: politician

Peter D. Lopez (born April 10, 1961) is a politician who served in the New York State Assembly from 2007 to 2017. He is a Republican.

On October 1, 2017, Lopez became the regional administrator for the United States Environmental Protection Agency's region 2, based in New York City.

== Early life ==
Lopez was born in Miami, Florida; his family moved to Schoharie, New York, where he was raised. He graduated from Schoharie Central School, the State University College at Cobleskill, and the University at Albany, where he received a Master of Public Administration degree in 1988.

== Career ==
Lopez became interested in public service as a young man, joining the Republican Party and running for the Schoharie Village Board at the age of 21. He won, defeating a candidate endorsed by the mayor. Lopez later won a seat on the Town Board and was subsequently elected as Town Supervisor.

Lopez worked as staff to the New York State Legislature for 21 years, collaborating with a broad range of public and private interests at the federal, state and local levels. Among his position was as associate director of the Senate Agriculture Committee (Senator John R. Kuhl, Jr., chairman), and assistant director of the Legislative Commission on Rural Resources (Senator Charles D. Cook, chairman). He also served as the District Office Director for Assembly Minority Leader John Faso, who ran for Governor of New York in 2006, and managed constituent services, including helping seniors and veterans access benefits.

In 2004, Lopez was elected County Clerk with about 70 percent of the vote; he served until 2006.

=== New York State Assembly ===
Lopez was first elected to the State Assembly in November 2006, when he defeated Siena College professor Scott Trees. He won a total of 58 percent of the vote on the Republican, Conservative, and Independence party lines. Lopez ran uncontested in the November 2008 and November 2010 general elections. In 2012, he was elected to represent the newly defined 102nd Assembly district.

Lopez supported energy conservation and the development of alternative energy sources in the Mohawk Valley, including wind farms. In 2007 he and his staff organized a tour of the Maple Ridge, Fenner, and Madison wind farms in New York state. Lopez also supports biodiesel research and development in the state, as well as tourism, family farms, and manufacturing.

Lopez has fought against the opioid epidemic, sponsoring Laree's Law, which holds drug dealers accountable for the deaths caused by the sale of opioids and other narcotics. Lopez has also been vocal about Albany's culture of corruption; he called on fellow lawmakers to strip the pensions of Sheldon Silver and Dean Skelos, who were both convicted of corruption charges.

=== Environmental Protection Agency ===
On September 28, 2017, Scott Pruitt, administrator of the U.S. Environmental Protection Agency, named Lopez to be regional administrator for region 2. The region 2 office is based in New York City, and its area of responsibility is New York State, New Jersey, Puerto Rico and the United States Virgin Islands.

== Other community involvement ==
Lopez has been a member of an advisory committee on runaway and troubled youth and has served as chairman of the Schoharie Main Street Committee. He is a founding member of Habitat for Humanity of Schoharie County. He has served as a member of the SUNY Cobleskill Foundation Board as well as the Bassett Hospital Board.

== Honors ==
- He received the Distinguished Alumni Award from both SUNY Cobleskill and SUNY Albany, the State University of New York's Golden Anniversary Chancellor's Recognition award, the New York State Masons' General Douglas MacArthur Award for Service to Youth, and the Schoharie County Chamber of Commerce's Leader of the Year Award.
- In 2012, he received the Times Journal Star of the Year Award for his dedicated efforts in helping communities recover from the devastation of Hurricane Irene in 2011 and Tropical Storm Lee.

New York State Assembly
| Preceded by Daniel L. Hooker | New York State Assembly, 127th District; 2007–2012 | Succeeded by Albert A. Stirpe Jr. |
New York State Assembly
| Preceded by Joel M. Miller | New York State Assembly, 102nd District; 2013–2017 | Succeeded by TBD |
