= Merchant wind power =

Merchant wind power (MWP) is a framework of developing electricity from wind turbines placed on land owned by brown-field sites, such as those of heavy industry. The wind-turbine operators then supply the land owners with power at reduced rates.

== History ==
The phrase was originally coined by Ecotricity, a UK-based, renewable energy company and wind developer. This has created a market where MWP companies install and operate the turbines on brown field sites, with site owners leasing land to the operator and purchasing green electricity at reduced rates.

In most cases the development, installation and operation of the turbine site is carried out by a company specialising in merchant wind power who effectively own and operate the turbines, taking all the financial risk required such as paying for procurement of turbines, installation cost etc.

== In the United States ==
Merchant power plant development began in the United States in 1998 with fossil fuel generation projects. In 2000, the first merchant wind plant constituted a signal that wind power costs had declined sufficiently to support investment in wind power without reliance on off-take contracts.

In the United States, "merchant power" refers to electric power generation plants built to serve spot electricity markets, without reliance on off-take contracts. Typically, power plants in the US are built based on long-term (10–20 years) contracts or "power purchase agreement" with a wholesale purchaser (such as a regulated utility or power marketing firm). Such arrangements allow for more favorable financing, as lenders and investors are more certain of future plant revenues when a credit-worthy utility agrees to purchase all or most future output at pre-defined prices (note, price may not be fixed, and can be defined either based on broad inflationary indices or linked to related commodity markets). However, in a merchant power arrangement, the plant is built without prior commitment of its output to contractual off-takers. Instead, the power is sold on a spot or short-term contract basis, such as on the PJM Interconnection, NYISO, or ISO-NE independent system operator power markets that have developed in the Northeastern US.

== Examples ==
The 11MW wind farm in Madison, New York was the first merchant wind power plant in the United States. It was developed by the unregulated arm of PG&E by Laura Walker.

Enron had planned to build the first merchant wind power plant in the country. However, prior to beginning operation in June 1999, the 16.5MW California plant entered into a power purchase agreement for its output. PG&E Generating Company's Madison Windpower Project began commercial operation in New York in October 2000 without relying on a power purchase agreement—thus making it the first pure merchant wind power plant in the country.

Another example of a merchant wind farm exists in the UK at Green Park which is situated on the M4 motorway in Reading.

== See also ==
- Electricity market
- Power purchase agreement
- Project finance
