= Peter Oberacker =

New York state senator

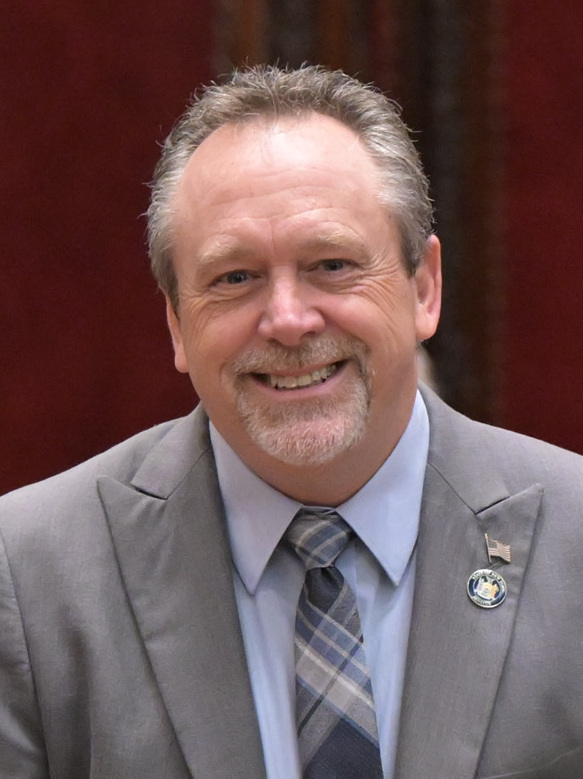
- Oberacker in 2025

Member of the New York State Senate from the 51st district
- Incumbent
- Assumed office January 1, 2021
- Preceded by: James Seward

Personal details
- Born: Peter Karl Oberacker Jr. May 13, 1963 (age 63) Merrick, New York, U.S.
- Party: Republican
- Spouse: Shannon Oberacker (m. 1986)
- Children: 2
- Education: State University of New York, Delhi (BA)
- Website: State Senate website Campaign website

Peter Karl Oberacker Jr. (born May 13, 1963) is an American businessman and politician. He is a member of the New York State Senate representing the 51st district. The boundaries of the 51st district changed following the 2020 United States redistricting cycle, and the district now includes portions of Broome, Chenango, Delaware, Otsego, Schoharie, Sullivan, and Ulster counties. First elected to the state senate in 2020, he succeeded the longtime incumbent James Seward, and assumed office in January 2021. Prior to becoming a state senator, he served in different local offices and helped launch the company FormTech Solutions.

During the 2026 election cycle, Oberacker ran on the Republican ticket against Democrat-Incumbent Josh Riley for New York's 19th U.S. Congressional District, which covers portions of the Catskills, Hudson Valley, greater Capital District, Southern Tier, and Finger Lakes regions. Riley defeated Oberacker by over 40,000 votes and nearly 15 percentage points.

== Early life ==
Oberacker was born in Merrick, New York. He graduated from SUNY Delhi in 1983. After graduating from college, he joined his father, also named Peter Oberacker, in operating Spicey Pete's Meats, a market in Schenevus. Oberacker became a research chef and food scientist specializing in various meat products.

== Political career ==
Oberacker was elected to the Maryland Town Board, a position he held for two terms before being elected town supervisor. After two terms as supervisor, Oberacker was elected to serve as an Otsego County legislator.

In 2020, retiring Senator James Seward encouraged Oberacker to run for the senate seat that he occupied at the time. Oberacker won the seat, winning 55.4 percent of the vote. He assumed office in January 2021.

=== 2026 U.S. House of Representatives election ===
In October 2025, Oberacker announced his candidacy for New York's 19th congressional district in the 2026 United States House of Representatives elections, challenging incumbent Josh Riley. During the campaign for the House of Representatives New York's 19th congressional district seat, Bobby Walker, who was set to become Oberacker’s campaign manager, was a part of the Young Republican group chat leaks. Walker, who had served as Oberacker's campaign manager for his 2020 New York State Senate election campaign, was fired soon after.

In August 2026, a 2015 Facebook post by Oberacker resurfaced in which he made a Veterans Day memorial post for his grandfather, who died in the Battle of the Bulge fighting for Nazi Germany. In the post, dated November 11, 2015 at 8:26pm, Oberacker wrote, “I debated on whether to post this picture, my Grandfather Ludwig Oberacker who gave his life for his country [Nazi Germany]. I salute all who served."

Oberacker, who had served on the state Senate’s Republican antisemitism working group, came under fire for the post. He later said, "Looking at it through the prism of today, totally different story. Having been on the antisemitism task force for the Senate Republicans, I would look at it a little bit differently now."

Oberacker lost the election by a significant margin.

== Political positions ==
=== Utilities ===
In June 2025, Oberacker called on the New York State Senate Investigations and Government Operations Committee to launch a full-scale investigation into the practices of utility companies, such as New York State Electric & Gas (NYSEG). Oberacker has also introduced the "Ratepayer Bill of Rights", a series of legislation that would outline "fundamental rights that utility customers should be guaranteed from accurate billing to fair outage compensation."

=== Food safety ===
Oberacker co-sponsored the bipartisan "New York Food Safety and Chemical Disclosure Act," which would ban certain food additives and colorants, and require packaged food companies to disclose more detailed information about the additives in their products. The legislation specifically would ban Erythrosine (Red No. 3), potassium bromate, and propylparaben, which have been linked to cancer, hormone disruption, and reproductive toxicity, from all foods sold in New York State.

=== Recreation ===
Oberacker's first bill to be approved by the senate was a bill that designated baseball as the official state sport of New York, an idea that was inspired by Cooperstown Elementary School students. The bill passed by a vote of 61–2.

=== Cannabis ===
Oberacker voted against the bill that legalized recreational cannabis in New York. The bill was signed by Governor Cuomo on March 31, 2021.

== Personal life ==
Oberacker has a wife named Shannon, who he calls his "high school sweetheart". He has two children and four grandchildren. He lives in Schenevus, New York, and is a member of his local fire department and EMS squad.

== Electoral history ==
2024 New York State Senate election, District 51
Party	Candidate	Votes	%
Republican	Peter Oberacker	81,783	53.2
Conservative	Peter Oberacker	9,499	6.2
Total	Peter Oberacker (incumbent)	91,282	59.3
Democratic	Michele Frazier	55,620	36.1
Working Families	Michele Frazier	6,865	4.5
Total	Michele Frazier	62,485	40.6
Write-in		93	0.1
Total votes		153,860	100.0

2022 New York State Senate election, District 51
Party	Candidate	Votes	%
Republican	Peter Oberacker	66,557	55.7
Conservative	Peter Oberacker	7,951	6.6
Total	Peter Oberacker (incumbent)	74,508	62.3
Democratic	Eric Ball	44,938	37.6
Write-in		110	0.1
Total votes		119,556	100.0

2020 New York State Senate election, District 51
Party	Candidate	Votes	%
Republican	Peter Oberacker	65,531	49.7
Conservative	Peter Oberacker	5,448	4.1
Independence	Peter Oberacker	2,021	1.5
Total	Peter Oberacker	73,000	55.4
Democratic	Jim Barber	58,691	44.5
Write-in		180	0.1
Total votes		131,871	100.0
