= Christopher Tague =

American politician

Member of the New York State Assembly from the 102nd district
- Incumbent
- Assumed office April 30, 2018
- Preceded by: Pete Lopez

Personal details
- Born: 1969 or 1970 (age 55–56)
- Party: Republican
- Website: Official website Campaign website

Christopher "Chris" Tague is an American politician, farmer, and businessman from the state of New York. A Republican, Tague has represented the 102nd district of the New York State Assembly, covering parts of the Hudson Valley, since 2018.

== Career ==
After graduating from high school in 1987, Tague ran a dairy business, selling it in 1992. From 1992 until 2017, Tague worked at Cobleskill Stone Products, eventually becoming the company's general manager. While Tague was the general manager, Cobleskill Stone was involved in a lawsuit filed by Mark Galasso that alleges financial malfeasance and also complains that one of the shareholders and Tague co-worker Mike Galasso, posted pro-Hitler tweets and co-ran a company with "Eric Feight, the man recently sentenced to more than eight years in prison for supporting a plot to build an X-ray weapon to kill Muslims."

He also served as Schoharie Town Supervisor between 2016 and 2018.

== Electoral history ==
In April 2018, upon the resignation of Republican Assemblyman Pete Lopez to become a regional administrator for the Environmental Protection Agency, a special election was held in the Assembly's 102nd district. After a closely fought campaign, Tague defeated Democrat Aidan O'Connor 46-44%, with Reform Party candidate Wesley Laraway taking the remainder.

Both Tague and O'Connor ran for a full term that following November. In a much higher turnout election, Tague defeated O'Connor by a wide margin, 56-44%.

After State Senator James Seward announced he wouldn't seek re-election to the 51st district in 2020, Tague was mentioned as a potential candidate, but he declined.

In 2026, he voted against a moratorium on data center permits and against a bill that would require AI developers to develop a safety protocol before launching new AI systems. During the COVID pandemic of 2020, he voted against extending unemployment benefits and against temporarily halting evictions and utility shutoffs. His other votes in 2020 include permitting the declawing of cats and biometric tracking of children in schools. He also served as a delegate for Donald Trump at the 2020 Republican National Convention. In 2022, he voted against a bill—that was successfully passed into law—protecting patients from hospitals and doctors who seek to garnish people's wages and place liens on their homes while collecting medical debt.

== Personal life ==
Tague was born and raised in Schoharie, New York, along with 2 siblings. He continues to live in Schoharie.
