= James L. Seward (New York politician) =

American politician in New York (1951–2024)

James Seward
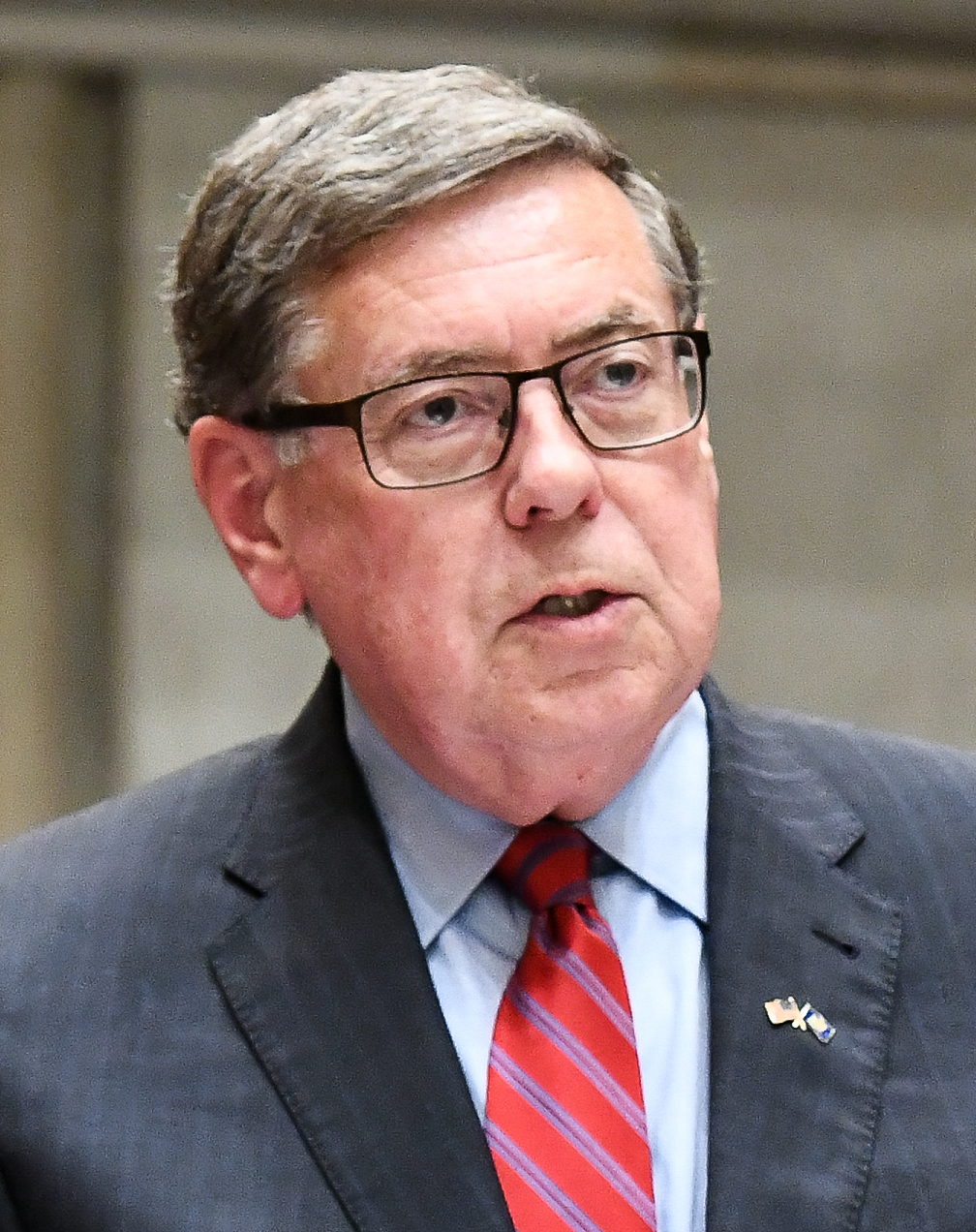
- Seward in 2019

Member of the New York State Senate
- In office January 1, 1987 – December 31, 2020
- Preceded by: Lloyd Stephen Riford Jr.
- Succeeded by: Peter Oberacker
- Constituency: 50th district (1987-2002); 51st district (2003-2020)

Personal details
- Born: August 11, 1951 Oneonta, New York, U.S.
- Died: July 27, 2024 (aged 72)
- Party: Republican
- Spouse: Cynthia Seward
- Children: Ryan and Lauren
- Education: Hartwick College (B.A.)
- Website: State Senate Site

James L. Seward (August 11, 1951 – July 27, 2024) was an American politician who was a Republican New York State Senator from 1987 to 2020. Seward was first elected to represent the 50th District in 1986. In his final term he represented the 51st District, which consists of Schoharie, Otsego, and Cortland Counties, as well as parts of Tompkins, Herkimer, Chenango, Cayuga, Delaware, and Ulster Counties.

== Early life and career ==
Seward was born in Oneonta, New York, and attended Oneonta public schools. He went on to Hartwick College in Oneonta and graduated with a Bachelor of Arts in political science. He also studied at the Nelson Rockefeller Institute of SUNY Albany.

Seward served as a Milford town justice and as chairman of the Otsego County Republican Committee. He was a delegate to the Republican National Convention in 1976, 1980, and 1988, and was also an alternate delegate in 1996. Seward and his wife Cynthia (née Milavec) resided in Milford, New York. The Sewards had two grown children, Ryan and Lauren.

== State Senate career ==
Seward was elected to the state senate in 1986 and was appointed chairman of the Senate Energy and Telecommunications Committee. In 1999, Seward became chairman of the Senate Standing Committee on Insurance.

In 2007, Seward was asked by former Senate Majority Leader Joseph Bruno to assume a post in the senate leadership team as majority whip. In 2011, Senator Republican Leader Dean G. Skelos asked him to assume the position of assistant majority leader on conference operations.

Seward voted against a same-sex marriage bill on December 2, 2009; the bill was defeated. He voted against legislation allowing same-sex marriage in New York again in 2011, but the bill was passed in a narrow 33–29 vote.

In November 2019, Seward announced that he was being treated for a recurrence of bladder cancer. In January 2020, he announced that he would not seek re-election.

== Death ==
Seward died from cancer on July 27, 2024, at the age of 72.

== See also ==
- 2009 New York State Senate leadership crisis

New York State Senate
Preceded by Lloyd Stephen Riford Jr.	New York State Senate; 50th District; 1987–2002	Succeeded by John A. DeFrancisco
Preceded by Thomas W. Libous	New York State Senate; 51st District; 2003–2020	Succeeded by Peter Oberacker
