= New York's 51st State Senate district =

American legislative district

Senator
Peter Oberacker; R–Schenevus
- Registration: 37.5% Republican; 31.5% Democratic; 22.2% No party preference
- Demographics: 93% White; 2% Black; 3% Hispanic; 1% Asian
- Population (2017): 287,246
- Registered voters: 183,008

New York's 51st State Senate district is one of 63 districts in the New York State Senate. It has been represented by Republican Peter Oberacker since 2021, succeeding fellow Republican James L. Seward.

== Geography ==
District 51 is a convoluted district in Central New York and the Hudson Valley, covering all of Schoharie, Otsego, and Cortland Counties, as well as parts of Tompkins, Herkimer, Chenango, Cayuga, Delaware, and Ulster Counties.

The district overlaps with New York's 18th, 19th, and 21st, and with the 101st, 102nd, 103rd, 118th, 119th, 121st, 122nd, 125th, and 126th districts of the New York State Assembly.

== Recent election results ==
=== 2026 ===
2026 New York State Senate election, District 51
Primary election
Party	Candidate	Votes	%
Republican	Christopher Tague	6,721	53.2
Republican	Terry Bernardo	5,882	46.6
Write-in		19	0.2
Total votes		12,622	100.0
General election
Republican	Christopher Tague		
Conservative	Christopher Tague		
Total	Christopher Tague		
Democratic	Michelle Frazier		
Working Families	Michelle Frazier		
Total	Michelle Frazier		
Write-in			
Total votes			

=== 2024 ===
2024 New York State Senate election, District 51
Party	Candidate	Votes	%
Republican	Peter Oberacker	81,783	
Conservative	Peter Oberacker	9,499	
Total	Peter Oberacker (incumbent)	91,282	59.3
Democratic	Michele Frazier	55,620	
Working Families	Michele Frazier	6,865	
Total	Michele Frazier	62,485	40.6
Write-in		93	0.1
Total votes		153,860	100.0
Republican hold			

=== 2022 ===
2022 New York State Senate election, District 51
Primary election
Party	Candidate	Votes	%
Republican	Peter Oberacker (incumbent)	10,360	51.4
Republican	Terry Bernardo	9,747	48.4
Write-in		38	0.2
Total votes		20,145	100.0
General election
Republican	Peter Oberacker	66,557	
Conservative	Peter Oberacker	7,951	
Total	Peter Oberacker (incumbent)	74,508	62.3
Democratic	Eric Ball	44,938	37.6
Write-in		110	0.1
Total votes		119,556	100.0
Republican hold			

=== 2020 ===
2020 New York State Senate election, District 51
Party	Candidate	Votes	%
Republican	Peter Oberacker	65,531	
Conservative	Peter Oberacker	5,448	
Independence	Peter Oberacker	2,021	
Total	Peter Oberacker	73,000	55.4
Democratic	Jim Barber	58,691	44.5
Write-in		180	0.1
Total votes		131,871	100.0
Republican hold			

=== 2018 ===
2018 New York State Senate election, District 51
Party	Candidate	Votes	%
Republican	James Seward	58,100	
Conservative	James Seward	6,014	
Independence	James Seward	2,500	
Reform	James Seward	487	
Total	James Seward (incumbent)	67,101	63.5
Democratic	Joyce St. George	36,628	
Women's Equality	Joyce St. George	1,982	
Total	Joyce St. George	38,610	36.5
Write-in		31	0.0
Total votes		105,742	100.0
Republican hold			

=== 2016 ===
2016 New York State Senate election, District 51
Party	Candidate	Votes	%
Republican	James Seward	70,396	
Conservative	James Seward	8,418	
Independence	James Seward	5,026	
Reform	James Seward	886	
Total	James Seward (incumbent)	84,726	72.6
Democratic	Jermaine Bagnall-Graham	29,899	
Women's Equality	Jermaine Bagnall-Graham	2,091	
Total	Jermaine Bagnall-Graham	31,990	27.4
Write-in		65	0.0
Total votes		116,781	100.0
Republican hold			

=== 2014 ===
2014 New York State Senate election, District 51
Party	Candidate	Votes	%
Republican	James Seward	46,867	
Independence	James Seward	7,557	
Conservative	James Seward	6,733	
Total	James Seward (incumbent)	61,157	99.5
Write-in		334	0.5
Total votes		61,491	100.0
Republican hold			

=== 2012 ===
2012 New York State Senate election, District 51
Primary election
Party	Candidate	Votes	%
Republican	James Seward (incumbent)	8,500	80.6
Republican	James Blake	2,044	19.4
Write-in		0	0.0
Total votes		10,544	100.0
General election
Republican	James Seward	64,807	
Conservative	James Seward	6,261	
Independence	James Seward	5,360	
Total	James Seward (incumbent)	76,428	68.6
Democratic	Howard Leib	31,276	
Working Families	Howard Leib	3,691	
Total	Howard Leib	34,967	31.3
Write-in		59	0.1
Total votes		111,454	100.0
Republican hold			

=== Federal results in District 51 ===
Year	Office	Results
2020	President	Trump 52.9 – 44.8%
2016	President	Trump 53.8 – 40.1%
2012	President	Obama 50.1 – 47.8%
2012	Senate	Gillibrand 63.0 – 34.9%
