= Madison Wind Farm =

Power generation plant in Madison, New York, U.S.

Coordinates: 43.784591°N 75.574557°W

The Madison Wind Farm was a power generation plant located in the town of Madison, New York, United States. Constructed in 1999-2000, it was the first wind farm completed in New York state and the first merchant wind farm in the country. The power plant consisted of seven Vestas V66-1.65 MW wind turbines, generating enough energy to power up to 10,000 homes. The Vestas V66-1.65 MW wind turbines had a hub height of 220 feet (67 m) and a 217 feet (66 m) rotor diameter totalling 330 feet (100 m) to the top of the rotor

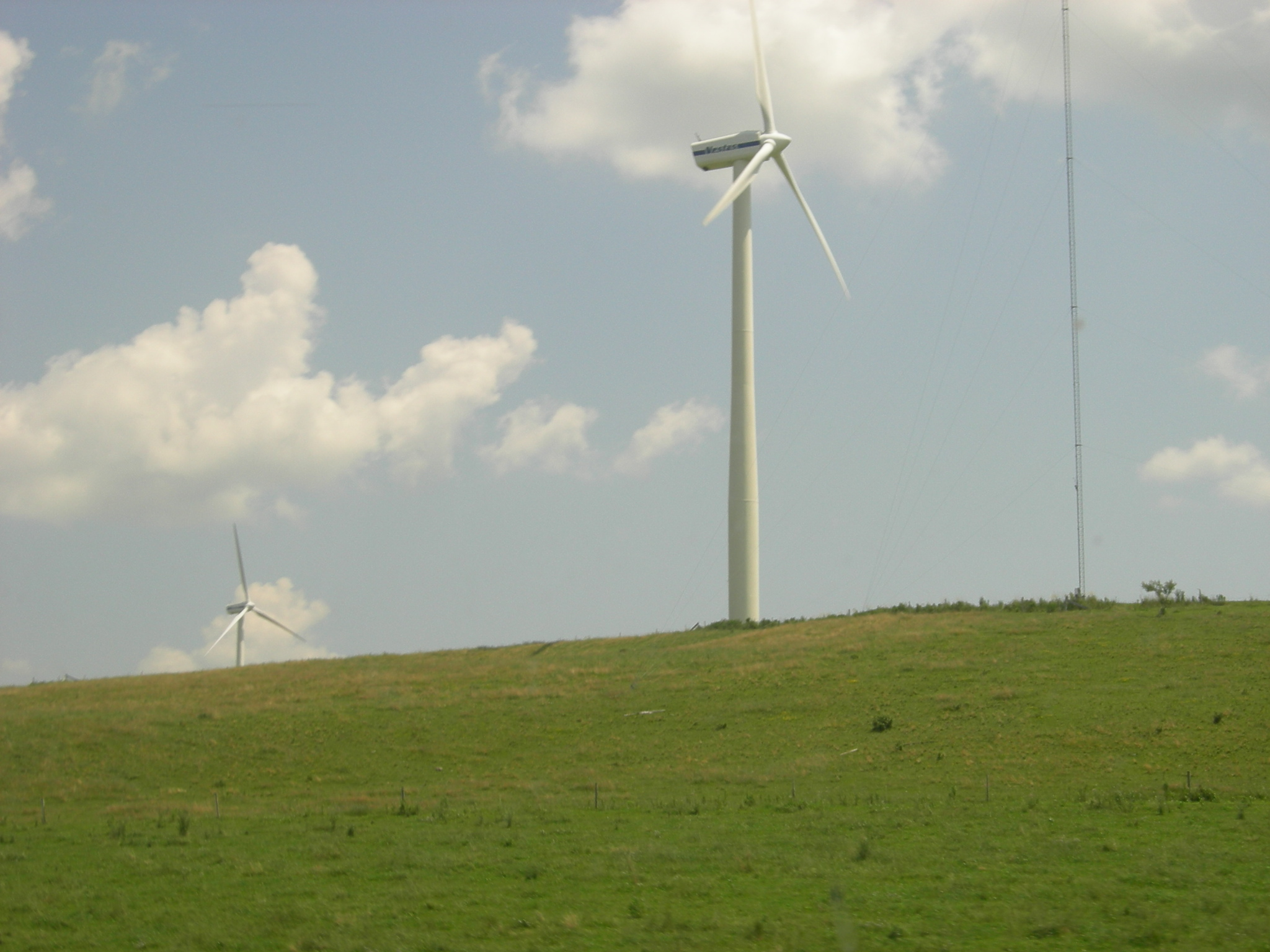
A turbine of the farm, photo taken in 2006

== History ==
The Madison Wind Farm was developed and funded by the unregulated arm of PG&E, by project manager Laura Walker; construction began in 1999. It was the second wind farm in New York State and the first merchant wind farm in the United States. The first wind farm was constructed a few years earlier by Niagara Mohawk and was located in Copenhagen, NY. Niagara Mohawk decommissioned their facility saying wind farms were not feasible in the state. The Madison facility is located on private dairy farm land in the town and county of Madison, in upstate New York. The New York State alternative energy program supported its development.

These turbines could produce enough energy for up to 10,000 homes. The power produced by these turbines was routed to New Jersey. The wind farm was owned by Horizon Wind Energy.

All seven turbines were taken down by implosion on September 17, 2025, because, according to the company, the wind farm was "no longer considered economically viable, primarily due to the current turbines being out of production, making repairs and obtaining replacement parts increasingly difficult and costly."

== Description ==
The Farm occupied more than 120 acres (49 ha) and the total wattage was eleven megawatts (MW).

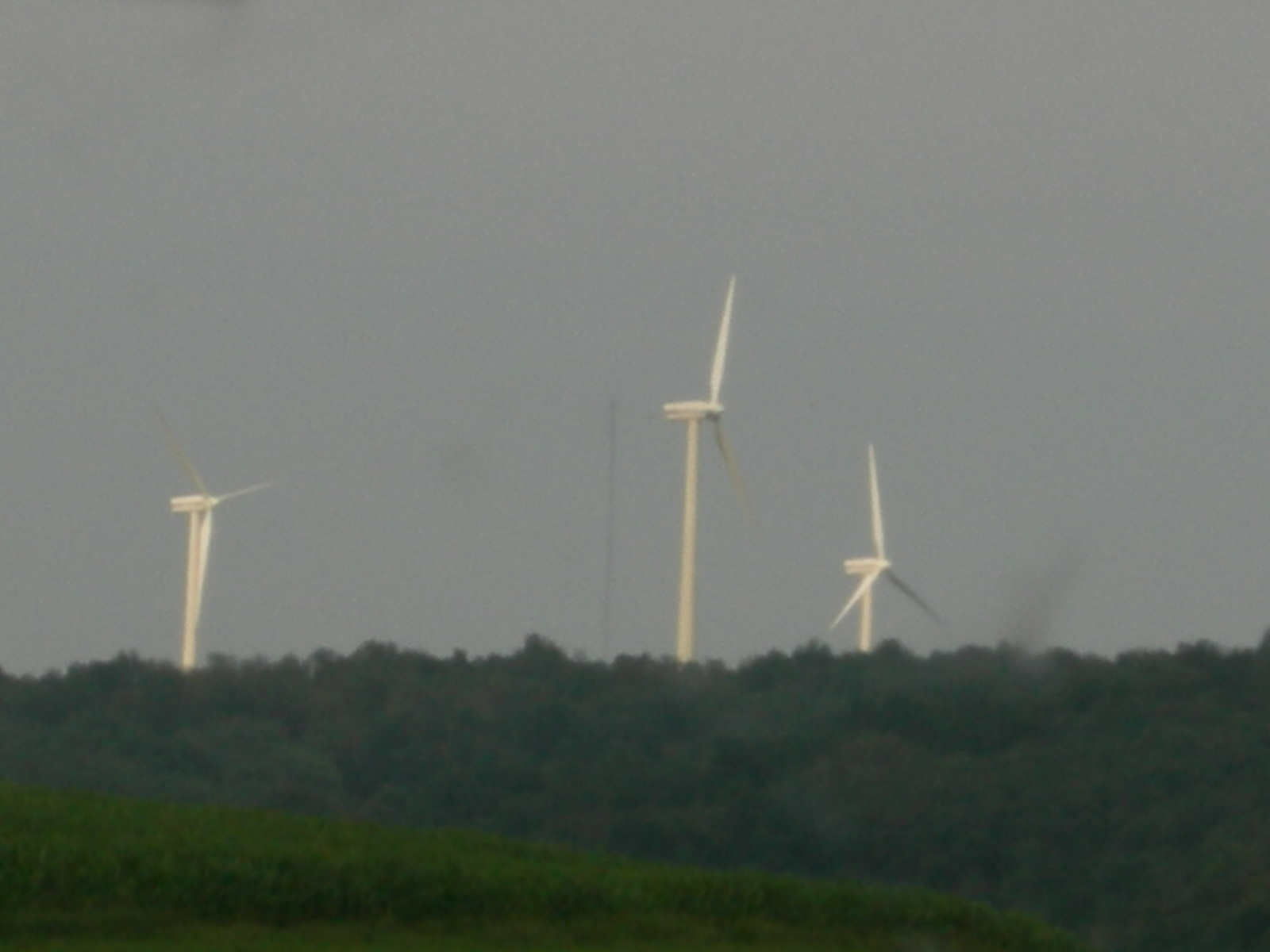
Wind farm from Route 20

The wind turbines had become a kind of tourist destination; people stopped from U.S. Route 20 to see the facility.

This wind farm was the first of three wind farms in the county, the second being the Fenner Wind Farm nearby, and the third the Munnsville facility.

== See also ==
- New York energy law
