= Fenner Wind Farm =

Wind farm in New York, United States

Coordinates: 42.9882°N 75.76552°W

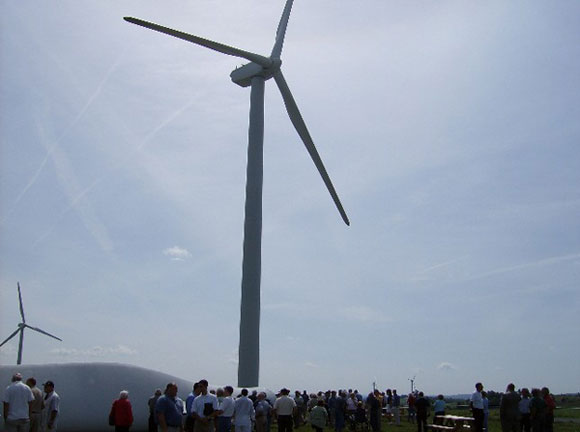
A turbine of the farm, photo taken in 2007

Fenner Wind Farm is situated in Madison County, New York. This farm is one of the first operating in New York State and is the second in Madison County.

== Specifications ==
The turbines of the Fenner Wind Farm are 1.5 megawatt GE turbines for a total power of 30 megawatts (MW). The wind farm is owned by Canastota Wind Power LLC, a subsidiary of Enel North America. Enel company is based in Italy. The energy produced at the farm provides electricity for more than 7,800 houses.

== Today ==
Since the turn of the 21st century three wind projects have been built in Madison County. The first is the Madison Wind Farm, constructed in 2000; Fenner was second, and the third is Munnsville Wind Farm, built in 2007. The first and third are both located east of the Fenner Wind Farm.

== 2009 tower collapse ==
On December 27, 2009, one of the 20 wind turbine towers, tower 18, unexpectedly collapsed. No one was injured, as the 187-ton structure fell in the middle of a field, but it left some Fenner residents worrying that another could fall. Fortunately, set backs from structures are such that no homes could be in jeopardy. Enel corporation is not sure what caused the collapse, but assured residents that it was unlikely another turbine would fall. Enel began an investigation into the cause of the collapse shortly afterward and expected to release its report in 2010. Months later, Enel North America said that forensic engineers ruled out "shoddy construction and deficiencies in the construction materials," but the company never released the final report to the public.

Due to the collapse, the wind farm was shut down while the accident was investigated. The company reinforced the foundations of each of the remaining towers, using a total of "four to six tons of steel and 10 truckloads of concrete." Three of the turbines were returned to production on August 12, 2010. The remaining 16 turbines went back online by late 2010.

In late 2012 Enel completed replacement of the collapsed turbine with a larger installation, a Goldwind 1.5 MW Permanent Magnet Direct Drive Machine. This was about one-third larger than the previous turbine, reflecting new technology. The turbine came online in December 2012.

== See also ==
- New York energy law
